= 2026–27 A-Liga =

Danish women's football league season

A-Liga
- Season: 2026–27
- Dates: 25 July 2026 – June 2027
- Matches: 75
- Goals: 252 (3.36 per match)
- Top goalscorer: Safi N'Sira (12 goals)
- Biggest home win: Nordsjælland 9–1 Copenhagen (23 August 2026)
- Biggest away win: Kolding IF 0–5 Brøndby (8 September 2026)
- Highest scoring: Nordsjælland 9–1 Copenhagen (23 August 2026); HB Køge 4–6 Nordsjælland (5 September 2026)
- Longest winning run: 6 matches Nordsjælland
- Longest unbeaten run: 11 matches Nordsjælland
- Longest winless run: 8 matches AGF
- Longest losing run: 8 matches AGF
- Highest attendance: 8,047; Copenhagen 1–2 Brøndby (3 October 2026)
- All statistics correct as of 17:53, 20 November 2026 (UTC). Only matches in the regular season and the championship play-offs are covered in the statistics

The 2026–27 A-Liga is the 53rd season of the top-flight of the Danish Women's Football League. This is the first season since 2014–15 to feature 10 teams in the top division, up from 8 the previous season.

The respective promotions of ASA and Copenhagen set the stage for the first Aarhus derby since Skovbakken vs ASA in 2002, as AGF was founded in 2020, and the first ever Copenhagen (New Firm) derby in A-Liga history, with Copenhagen founded in 2024. The Aarhus derby was both ASA and AGF's first match of the season, with promoted side ASA winning 3–1 at home against top-tier mainstays AGF. The youngest player in league history, Kaya Mortensen, debuted for Brøndby on 16 August 2026 against AGF on her 15th birthday. The premiere New Firm derby on 29 August saw newly promoted Copenhagen win 3–1 against home side Brøndby, an upset as the promoted side had yet to win a match in the league hitherto and came off of a big 1–9 loss against Nordsjælland. The return derby on 3 October 2026 saw Brøndby winning 2–1 against Copenhagen at Parken Stadium with a league record 8,047 in attendance. ASA did the double over local rivals AGF in the return derby, winning 3–1 in front of 600 spectators. Copenhagen midfielder Josefine Svava became the youngest goalscorer in the history of the league in the 25 October 2026 match against Fortuna Hjørring at 15 years and 122 days. AGF and Nordsjælland were both cautioned for delaying the second half of the 27 October 2026 match. ASA secured its spot in the championship play-offs during the 16th round, for the first time in the club's history. The 21 November ASA-Copenhagen match was cancelled due to a frozen pitch, with the match set to be rescheduled.

== Format ==
The main round of the league is played in autumn as a double round-robin tournament between the 10 participating teams, where each team plays against each other both at home and away.

The six best placed teams qualify for spring championship play-offs. The finals consist once again of a double round-robin tournament among the six participating teams. The scores from the main league round carry over into the championship play-offs.

The four bottom ranked teams play qualification play-offs, a double round-robin tournament with the top four teams of 2026–27 B-Liga for four spots in 2027–28 A-Liga. The scores from the regular season are not carried over into the qualification play-offs.

== Teams ==
There are 10 teams competing in the regular season of the league: the 6 teams from the previous season's championship play-offs, and the top 4 teams from the previous season's qualification play-offs. The four teams promoted from the qualification play-offs were FC Midtjylland and OB Q, keeping their A-Liga spots, and ASA Fodbold and Copenhagen, winning promotion from the B-Liga. As last season comprised 8 teams, no A-Liga teams were relegated.

This is the first season in the top flight for Copenhagen, having won back-to-back promotion starting in C-Liga, since its founding in 2024. It is ASA Fodbold's first season back in the top-flight since the 2015–16 season.

=== Changes ===
▲ from 2025–26 B-Liga
ASA
Copenhagen

=== Stadiums and locations ===
Locations of the 2026–27 A-Liga teams.

| Team | Location | Stadium | P | Capacity |
|---|---|---|---|---|
| AGF | Aarhus | Ceres Park Vejlby (Note: Due to renovations of Aarhus Stadium, the club have played their home matches at Vejlby Stadium since 2025) | G | 11,500 |
| ASA | Aarhus | Riisvangen Stadium (Note: ASA will play the last 4 matches of the regular season at Riisvangen. The club is still looking for a permanent home stadium to comply with league requirements.) | G | 5,000 |
| ASA | Aarhus | XL Park Vorup (Note: ASA leased Ulvehøj Sports Center Stadium (XL Park Vorup) with temporary dispensation of league requirements until October.) | A | 3,000 |
| Brøndby IF | Brøndby | 1964 Park (Note: Some matches to be played at Brøndby Stadium) | A | 2,000 |
| Copenhagen | Copenhagen | Vanløse Idrætspark (Note: Some matches to be played at Parken Stadium) | G | 10,000 |
| Fortuna Hjørring | Hjørring | Nord Energi Arena | G | 10,000 |
| Kolding IF | Kolding | Kolding Stadium | G | 10,000 |
| HB Køge | Køge | Capelli Sports Stadium | A | 4,000 |
| FC Midtjylland | Herning | MCH Arena | G | 11,809 |
| FC Nordsjælland | Farum | Right to Dream Park | A | 10,300 |
| OB Q | Odense | Nature Energy Park | G | 15,790 |

G denotes grass pitch
A denotes artificial pitch

=== Personnel and kits ===
| Team | Manager | Captain | Kit | Sponsor | Sponsor |
|---|---|---|---|---|---|
| AGF | (Denmark) Anders Fedder Kristensen | (Denmark) Cecilie Johansen | (Sweden) Craft | (Denmark) Sparekassen Danmark | (Denmark) Faxe Kondi |
| ASA | (Denmark) Henrik Larsen | (Denmark) Caroline Ahrendtsen | (Germany) Adidas | (Denmark) Select | —N/a |
| Brøndby | (Norway) Bengt Sæternes | (Denmark) Kamilla Karlsen | (Denmark) Hummel | (Germany) Volkswagen | (Denmark) Faxe Kondi |
| Copenhagen | (Spain) Fabiana Alcalà (interim) | (Denmark) Ida Skovbo | (Germany) Adidas | (Denmark) Andel Energi | (Denmark) Carlsberg |
| Fortuna Hjørring | (Denmark) Niclas Hougaard | (Romania) Florentina Olar | (United States) Nike | (Denmark) Rederiet Isafold | —N/a |
| HB Køge | (Denmark) Kristian Mørch | (Denmark) Mille Gejl | (United States) Capelli Sport | (United States) Palmer Square | —N/a |
| Kolding | (Denmark) Lasse Skovhøj | (Denmark) Sara Amby | (Denmark) Hummel | (Denmark) Fynske Bank | —N/a |
| Midtjylland | (Denmark) Claus Struck | (Denmark) Rikke Dybdahl | (Germany) Puma | (Denmark) itm8 | (Denmark) AL Sydbank (Note: The kits still say 'Vestjysk Bank'.) |
| Nordsjælland | (Canada) Amy Harrison | (Denmark) Karen Linnebjerg | (United States) Nike | (Germany) DHL | (Denmark) VELUX |
| OB | (Denmark) Kasper Mayland | (Denmark) Emilie Henriksen | (Denmark) Hummel | (Denmark) Albani | (Denmark) Faxe Kondi |

=== Managerial changes ===
| Team | Outgoing manager | Manner of departure | Date of vacancy | Rank | Incoming manager | Date of appointment |
|---|---|---|---|---|---|---|
| Nordsjælland | (England) Chris Sargeant | Mutual consent | 30 June 2026 (Note: Sargeant's departure was announced on 27 April 2026) (Note: Fedder's departure was announced on 7 May 2026) (Note: Terp's departure was announced on 1 June 2026) | Pre-season | (Canada) Amy Harrison | 27 April 2026 |
| ASA | (Denmark) Anders Fedder Kristensen | Signed by AGF | 30 June 2026 | Pre-season | (Denmark) Henrik Larsen | 7 July 2026 |
| Fortuna Hjørring | (Denmark) Lene Terp | Resigned | 30 June 2026 | Pre-season | (Denmark) Niclas Hougaard | 5 June 2026 |
| Copenhagen | (Denmark) Kasper Klarskov | Sacked | 21 August 2026 | 9th | (Spain) Fabiana Alcalà (interim) | 21 August 2026 |
| AGF | (Denmark) Søren Kiilerich | Sacked | 6 November 2026 | 10th | (Denmark) Anders Fedder Kristensen | 6 November 2026 |

== Regular season ==
=== League table ===
| Pos | Team | Pld | W | D | L | GF | GA | GD | Pts | Qualification |
|---|---|---|---|---|---|---|---|---|---|---|
| 1 | HB Køge (Q) | 16 | 13 | 2 | 1 | 51 | 17 | +34 | 41 | Championship play-offs |
| 2 | Nordsjælland (Q) | 16 | 10 | 4 | 2 | 45 | 16 | +29 | 34 | Championship play-offs |
| 3 | Brøndby (Q) | 16 | 9 | 4 | 3 | 35 | 13 | +22 | 31 | Championship play-offs |
| 4 | Midtjylland (Q) | 16 | 9 | 3 | 4 | 23 | 19 | +4 | 30 | Championship play-offs |
| 5 | Fortuna Hjørring (Q) | 16 | 7 | 3 | 6 | 33 | 20 | +13 | 24 | Championship play-offs |
| 6 | ASA (Q) | 15 | 7 | 2 | 6 | 17 | 23 | −6 | 23 | Championship play-offs |
| 7 | Kolding (Q) | 16 | 4 | 3 | 9 | 26 | 38 | −12 | 15 | Qualification play-offs |
| 8 | OB Q (Q) | 16 | 4 | 2 | 10 | 10 | 32 | −22 | 14 | Qualification play-offs |
| 9 | Copenhagen (Q) | 15 | 3 | 1 | 11 | 18 | 42 | −24 | 10 | Qualification play-offs |
| 10 | AGF (Q) | 16 | 1 | 0 | 15 | 10 | 48 | −38 | 3 | Qualification play-offs |

Updated to match(es) played on 22 November 2026. Source: Danish Football Association (in Danish)
Rules for classification: 1) Points; 2) Goal difference; 3) Goals scored; 4) Head-to-head points; 5) Head-to-head goal difference; 6) Play-off (played on neutral ground if determining teams for different rounds); 7) Draw.
(Q) Qualified for the phase indicated

=== Results ===
| Home \ Away | AGF | ASA | BRØ | FCK | HJØ | KØG | KOL | MID | NOR | ODE |
|---|---|---|---|---|---|---|---|---|---|---|
| AGF | | 1–3 | 0–3 | 4–2 | 1–4 | 0–2 | 0–4 | 0–2 | 0–2 | |
| ASA | 3–1 | | 0–0 | | 2–1 | | 1–0 | 1–0 | 1–3 | 1–1 |
| Brøndby | 4–1 | 3–0 | | 1–3 | 4–0 | 1–2 | | 1–2 | 1–1 | 2–0 |
| Copenhagen | | 1–0 | 1–2 | | 1–4 | 0–3 | 2–6 | 0–1 | 2–1 | 1–2 |
| Fortuna Hjørring | 3–0 | | 1–2 | 3–1 | | 1–2 | 0–0 | 0–0 | 1–1 | 4–0 |
| HB Køge | 6–0 | 4–0 | 1–1 | | 2–1 | | 4–1 | 4–0 | 4–6 | 3–0 |
| Kolding | 2–1 | 1–3 | 0–5 | 2–2 | 2–6 | 2–3 | | | 1–2 | 3–1 |
| Midtjylland | 2–1 | 4–1 | 1–1 | 2–0 | | 1–5 | 3–1 | | 0–0 | 2–0 |
| Nordsjælland | 5–0 | 3–0 | | 9–1 | 2–1 | 2–2 | 4–0 | 4–1 | | 0–1 |
| OB Q | 1–0 | 0–1 | 0–4 | 2–1 | 0–3 | 1–4 | 1–1 | 0–2 | | |

Updated to match(es) played on 22 November 2026. Source: Danish Football Association (in Danish)
Legend: Blue = home team win; Yellow = draw; Red = away team win.

== Play-offs ==
=== Championship ===
==== League table ====
| Pos | Team | Pld | W | D | L | GF | GA | GD | Pts | Qualification |
|---|---|---|---|---|---|---|---|---|---|---|
| 1 | ASA | 0 | 0 | 0 | 0 | 0 | 0 | 0 | 0 | 2027–28 Champions League QR |
| 2 | Brøndby | 0 | 0 | 0 | 0 | 0 | 0 | 0 | 0 | 2027–28 Champions League QR |
| 3 | Fortuna Hjørring | 0 | 0 | 0 | 0 | 0 | 0 | 0 | 0 | |
| 4 | HB Køge | 0 | 0 | 0 | 0 | 0 | 0 | 0 | 0 | |
| 5 | Midtjylland | 0 | 0 | 0 | 0 | 0 | 0 | 0 | 0 | |
| 6 | Nordsjælland | 0 | 0 | 0 | 0 | 0 | 0 | 0 | 0 | |

Updated to match(es) played on TBA. Source:
Rules for classification: 1) Points; 2) Goal difference; 3) Goals scored; 4) Head-to-head points; 5) Head-to-head goal difference; 6) Play-off (played on neutral ground if determining teams for different rounds); 7) Draw.

==== Results ====
| Home \ Away | ASA | BRØ | HJØ | KØG | MID | NOR |
|---|---|---|---|---|---|---|
| ASA | | | | | | |
| Brøndby | | | | | | |
| Fortuna Hjørring | | | | | | |
| HB Køge | | | | | | |
| Midtjylland | | | | | | |
| Nordsjælland | | | | | | |

Updated to match(es) played on TBA. Source:
Legend: Blue = home team win; Yellow = draw; Red = away team win.

=== Qualification ===
==== League table ====
| Pos | Team | Pld | W | D | L | GF | GA | GD | Pts | Qualification |
|---|---|---|---|---|---|---|---|---|---|---|
| 1 | AGF | 0 | 0 | 0 | 0 | 0 | 0 | 0 | 0 | 2027–28 A-Liga |
| 2 | B.93 | 0 | 0 | 0 | 0 | 0 | 0 | 0 | 0 | 2027–28 A-Liga |
| 3 | Copenhagen | 0 | 0 | 0 | 0 | 0 | 0 | 0 | 0 | 2027–28 A-Liga |
| 4 | Kolding | 0 | 0 | 0 | 0 | 0 | 0 | 0 | 0 | 2027–28 A-Liga |
| 5 | OB Q | 0 | 0 | 0 | 0 | 0 | 0 | 0 | 0 | 2027–28 B-Liga |
| 6 | Sundby | 0 | 0 | 0 | 0 | 0 | 0 | 0 | 0 | 2027–28 B-Liga |

Updated to match(es) played on TBA. Source:
Rules for classification: 1) Points; 2) Goal difference; 3) Goals scored; 4) Head-to-head points; 5) Head-to-head goal difference; 6) Play-off (played on neutral ground if determining teams for different rounds); 7) Draw.

==== Results ====
| Home \ Away | AGF | B93 | FCK | KOL | ODE | SUN |
|---|---|---|---|---|---|---|
| AGF | | | | | | |
| B.93 | | | | | | |
| Copenhagen | | | | | | |
| Kolding | | | | | | |
| OB Q | | | | | | |
| Sundby | | | | | | |

Updated to match(es) played on TBA. Source:
Legend: Blue = home team win; Yellow = draw; Red = away team win.

== Season statistics ==
As of 22 November 2026

=== Top scorers ===
| Rank | Player | Club | Goals |
|---|---|---|---|
| 1 | (Ivory Coast) Safi N'Sira | Nordsjælland | 13 |
| 2 | (Denmark) Nadia Nadim | HB Køge | 10 |
| 3 | (Denmark) Mila Bischoff | Brøndby | 9 |
| 3 | (Denmark) Amalie Lund | Kolding IF | 9 |
| 3 | (Iceland) Emelia Óskarsdóttir | HB Køge | 9 |
| 6 | (Republic of Ireland) Kyra Carusa | HB Køge | 8 |
| 6 | (Ivory Coast) Grâce Sery | Nordsjælland | 8 |
| 6 | (Denmark) Josefine Valvik | Fortuna Hjørring | 8 |
| 9 | (Denmark) Clara la Cour | Nordsjælland | 6 |
| 9 | (Denmark) Mille Gejl | HB Køge | 6 |
| 9 | (Sweden) Tilde Lindwall | Brøndby | 6 |

==== Hat-tricks ====
| Player | Club | Against | Result | Date | Round | Ref. |
|---|---|---|---|---|---|---|
| (Denmark) Thea Petersen | Nordsjælland | Copenhagen | 9–1 (H) | 23 August 2026 | 4 | |
| (Ivory Coast) Safi N'Sira | Nordsjælland | HB Køge | 4–6 (A) | 5 September 2026 | 6 | |

=== Clean sheets ===
| Rank | Player | Club | Clean sheets |
|---|---|---|---|
| 1 | (United States) Jalen Tompkins | Brøndby | 6 |
| 2 | (Finland) Milla-Maj Majasaari | Midtjylland | 5 |
| 2 | (Finland) Helmi Vihervuori (Note: Ervasti and Vihervuori both record the clean sheet as the latter was subbed on at half-time.) | Nordsjælland | 5 |
| 4 | (Denmark) Sidse Tryk | ASA | 4 |
| 5 | (United States) Lauren Kozal | HB Køge | 3 |
| 5 | (Romania) Andreea Părăluță | Fortuna | 3 |
| 5 | (Denmark) Alberte Vingum | HB Køge | 3 |
| 8 | (Serbia) Ema Aleksić | Kolding | 2 |
| 8 | (Denmark) Freja Thisgaard | Fortuna | 2 |
| 8 | (Denmark) Laura Worsøe | OB Q | 2 |

=== Discipline ===
==== Player ====
- Most yellow cards: 5
  - (Finland) Emmaliina Tulkki (Copenhagen)
- Most red cards: 1
  - (Denmark) Asta Kynde (Kolding)
  - (Denmark) Nellie Mulvad (Nordsjælland)
  - (Denmark) Thea Petersen (Nordsjælland)
  - (Denmark) Sarah Vinther (Nordsjælland)
  - (Denmark) Julie Poulsen (AGF)
  - (Denmark) Sanne Troelsgaard (Midtjylland)

==== Club ====
- Most yellow cards: 25
  - Copenhagen
- Fewest yellow cards: 5
  - Midtjylland
- Most red cards: 3
  - Nordsjælland
- Fewest red cards: 0
  - 6 clubs

== Awards ==
=== Player of the Month ===
| Month | Player | Club | Ref. |
|---|---|---|---|
| August | (Denmark) Amalie Lund | Kolding IF | |
| September | (Ivory Coast) Safi N'Sira | Nordsjælland | |
| October | (Denmark) Karoline Wutborg | ASA | |

== Sources ==
- "A-Liga 2026/2027 | Overblik, kampe og nyheder (Kvinder) - TV 2". sport.tv2.dk (in Danish).
- "A-Liga | Stilling, resultater & kampprogram". Bold (in Danish).

== See also ==
- 2026–27 B-Liga
- 2026–27 C-Liga
- 2026–27 Danish Women's Cup
- 2026–27 Champions League
- 2026–27 Europa Cup
