= 2015–16 Danish Elite Division =

Danish Elite Division
- Season: 2015–16
- Dates: 8 August 2015–18 June 2016
- Champions: Fortuna Hjørring
- Relegated: ASA
- Matches: 56
- Goals: 210 (3.75 per match)
- Top goalscorer: Nanna Christiansen (13 goals)
- Biggest home win: Brøndby 9–0 ASA (29 August 2015)
- Biggest away win: ASA 0–11 Brøndby (7 November 2015)
- Highest scoring: ASA 0–11 Brøndby (7 November 2015)
- Longest unbeaten run: 14 matches Fortuna Hjørring
- Longest winless run: 14 matches ASA

The 2015-16 Danish Elite Division (known as 3F-ligaen for sponsorship reasons) was the 44th season of the top-flight of the Danish Women's Football League. This was the last season before the league was renamed the Danish Women's League.

== Format ==
The eight teams play each other twice for a total of 14 matches per team. After that the top six teams play the championship round and the bottom two teams play the qualification round.

In the championship play-offs, each of the six teams play each other twice. Points accumulated at the regular season are halved and added to the points total in the championship play-offs. The champions and runners-up qualify for the 2016–17 UEFA Women's Champions League.

In the qualification play-offs, the two bottom teams of the regular season are joined by the top four teams of the 1st Division. The play-offs are a round robin matches played home and away. No points are carried over to the qualification play-offs. The teams finishing in the top two slots qualify for the 2016–17 season, while the remaining four teams will play in the 2016–17 1st Division.

== Teams ==
There were 8 teams competing in the regular season of the league: the 6 teams from the previous season's championship play-offs, and the top 2 teams from the previous season's qualification play-offs. The two teams promoted from the qualification play-offs were Vejle, keeping their Elitedivisionen spot, and ASA Fodbold, winning promotion from the 1st Division. The two teams relegated from Elitedivisionen were Team Viborg and Vorup. The B.93/HIK/Skjold association dissolved at the start of the 2014–15 season, thus only 5 teams participated in the qualification play-offs. While the league was reduced from 10 to 8 participating teams, only two clubs were relegated as Vejle stayed in the league and B.93/HIK/Skjold dissolved and withdrew from the league.

=== Changes ===
▲ from 2014–15 1st Division	▼ to 2015–16 1st Division
ASA	Team Viborg; Vorup

=== Stadiums and locations ===
Locations of the 2015–16 Elitedivisionen teams.

Team	Location	Stadium	Capacity
ASA	Aarhus	ASA Grounds	1,000
Brøndby	Brøndby	Brøndby Stadium (Note: Some matches were played at Bane 2)	29,000
BSF	Ballerup	Ballerup Sports Park Stadium	4,000
Fortuna Hjørring	Hjørring	Hjørring Stadium	7,500
Skovbakken	Aarhus	Vejlby Stadium (Note: Some matches were played at the College Pitch (Danish: Kunstgræsbanen Idrætshøjskolen).)	5,200
KoldingQ	Kolding	Mosevej Sports Grounds (Note: One match was played at the Mosevej Pitch (Danish: Mosevej Kunstgræsbane).)	1,500
OB	Odense	Odense Athletics Stadium (Note: One match was played at OB-Ådalen.)	8,000
Vejle	Vejle	VB Parken (Note: The opening match against Brøndby was played at Vejle Stadium; two matches were played at the College Pitch (Danish: Vejle Idrætsefterskoles Kunstgræsbane).)	1,000

=== Personnel and kits ===
Team	Manager	Captain	Kit	Sponsor	Sponsor
ASA	(Denmark) Hans-Martin Lauesen (Denmark) Anders Østergaard	(Denmark) Ida Norup	(Denmark)	(Denmark)	
Brøndby	(Denmark) Per Nielsen	(Denmark) Theresa Nielsen	(Denmark)	(Denmark)	
BSF	(Denmark) John Froman	(Denmark) Nikoline Andresen	(Denmark)	(Denmark)	
Fortuna Hjørring	(Denmark) Brian Sørensen	(Denmark) Line Sigvardsen Jensen	(Denmark)	(Denmark)	
KoldingQ	(Denmark) Lene Terp	(Denmark) Sanne Troelsgaard	(Denmark)	(Denmark)	
OB	(Denmark) Thomas Hansen	(Denmark) Victoria Black	(Germany) Puma	(Denmark)	
Skovbakken	(Denmark) Kim Leth	(Denmark) Sif Rykær	(Denmark)	(Denmark)	
Vejle	(Denmark) Jesper Søgaard	(Denmark) Charlotte Sørensen	(Denmark) Hummel	(Denmark)	

== Regular season ==
=== League table ===
Pos	Team	Pld	W	D	L	GF	GA	GD	Pts	Qualification
1	Fortuna Hjørring	14	11	3	0	44	8	+36	36	Championship play-offs
2	Brøndby	14	10	3	1	60	8	+52	33	Championship play-offs
3	Skovbakken	14	7	5	2	22	20	+2	26	Championship play-offs
4	KoldingQ	14	7	3	4	29	15	+14	24	Championship play-offs
5	OB	14	5	3	6	29	18	+11	18	Championship play-offs
6	Vejle	14	3	3	8	12	31	−19	12	Championship play-offs
7	BSF	14	1	3	10	8	52	−44	6	Qualification play-offs
8	ASA	14	0	1	13	6	58	−52	1	Qualification play-offs

Source: Danish Football Association (in Danish)
Rules for classification: 1) Points; 2) Goal difference; 3) Goals scored; 4) Head-to-head points; 5) Head-to-head goal difference; 6) Play-off (played on neutral grounds if determining teams for different rounds) or draw.

=== Results ===
Home \ Away	ASA	BRØ	BSF	HJØ	KOL	ODE	IKS	VEJ
ASA		0–11	0–1	0–1	1–3	0–5	1–3	0–3
Brøndby	9–0		6–0	1–1	1–2	2–0	8–0	3–1
BSF	1–1	0–7		0–10	1–6	2–2	0–1	1–1
Fortuna Hjørring	8–0	2–2	3–0		2–1	2–1	2–0	5–0
KoldingQ	4–1	0–2	3–0	0–2		4–0	1–3	0–0
OB	2–0	2–3	8–0	1–2	0–0		0–2	5–0
Skovbakken	3–1	0–0	2–1	2–2	2–2	1–1		3–1
Vejle	4–1	0–5	2–1	0–2	0–3	0–2	0–0	

Source: Danish Football Association (in Danish)
Legend: Blue = home team win; Yellow = draw; Red = away team win.

== Play-offs ==
=== Championship ===
Points accumulated in the regular season are halved and added to this stage.

Pos	Team	Pld	W	D	L	GF	GA	GD	Pts	Qualification
1	Fortuna Hjørring (C)	10	9	0	1	45	10	+35	45	Champions League QR
2	Brøndby	10	7	2	1	23	9	+14	40	Champions League QR
3	Skovbakken	10	1	4	5	8	26	−18	20	
4	KoldingQ	10	3	3	4	13	23	−10	24	
5	OB	10	2	3	5	12	14	−2	18	
6	Vejle	10	0	4	6	4	23	−19	10	

Source: Danish Football Association (in Danish)
Rules for classification: 1) Points; 2) Goal difference; 3) Goals scored; 4) Head-to-head points; 5) Head-to-head goal difference; 6) Play-off (played on neutral grounds if determining teams for different rounds) or draw.
(C) Champions

==== Results ====
Home \ Away	BRØ	HJØ	KOL	ODE	IKS	VEJ
Brøndby		4–2	3–2	1–0	3–0	3–0
Fortuna Hjørring	2–1		5–0	4–2	7–1	6–0
KoldingQ	1–5	0–5		0–0	2–2	1–0
OB	0–1	1–3	2–3		3–0	1–1
Skovbakken	1–1	1–6	1–1	0–2		0–0
Vejle	1–1	0–5	0–3	1–1	1–2	

Source: Danish Football Association (in Danish)
Legend: Blue = home team win; Yellow = draw; Red = away team win.

=== Qualification ===
Pos	Team	Pld	W	D	L	GF	GA	GD	Pts	Qualification
1	BSF	10	7	0	3	19	9	+10	21	2016–17 Danish League
2	Varde (P)	10	6	2	2	24	10	+14	20	2016–17 Danish League
3	Næsby	10	5	3	2	16	13	+3	18	2016–17 Danish 1st Division
4	Sundby	10	3	4	3	16	16	0	13	2016–17 Danish 1st Division
5	ASA (R)	10	1	4	5	8	18	−10	7	2016–17 Danish 1st Division
6	Team Viborg	10	1	1	8	15	32	−17	4	2016–17 Danish 1st Division

Source: Danish Football Association (in Danish)
Rules for classification: 1) Points; 2) Goal difference; 3) Goals scored; 4) Head-to-head points; 5) Head-to-head goal difference; 6) Play-off (played on neutral grounds if determining teams for different rounds) or draw.
(P) Promoted; (R) Relegated

==== Results ====
Home \ Away	ASA	BSF	NÆB	SUN	VAR	VIB
ASA		0–1	0–0	0–0	1–4	4–2
BSF	2–0		0–1	2–1	3–0	4–1
Næsby	2–0	0–2		2–4	1–1	5–3
Sundby	1–1	2–3	1–1		0–3	4–2
Varde	4–0	2–1	1–2	1–1		6–1
Viborg	2–2	2–1	1–2	1–2	0–2	

Source: Danish Football Association (in Danish)
Legend: Blue = home team win; Yellow = draw; Red = away team win.

== Season statistics ==
Only matches in the regular season and championship play-offs are covered in the statistics.

=== Top scorers ===
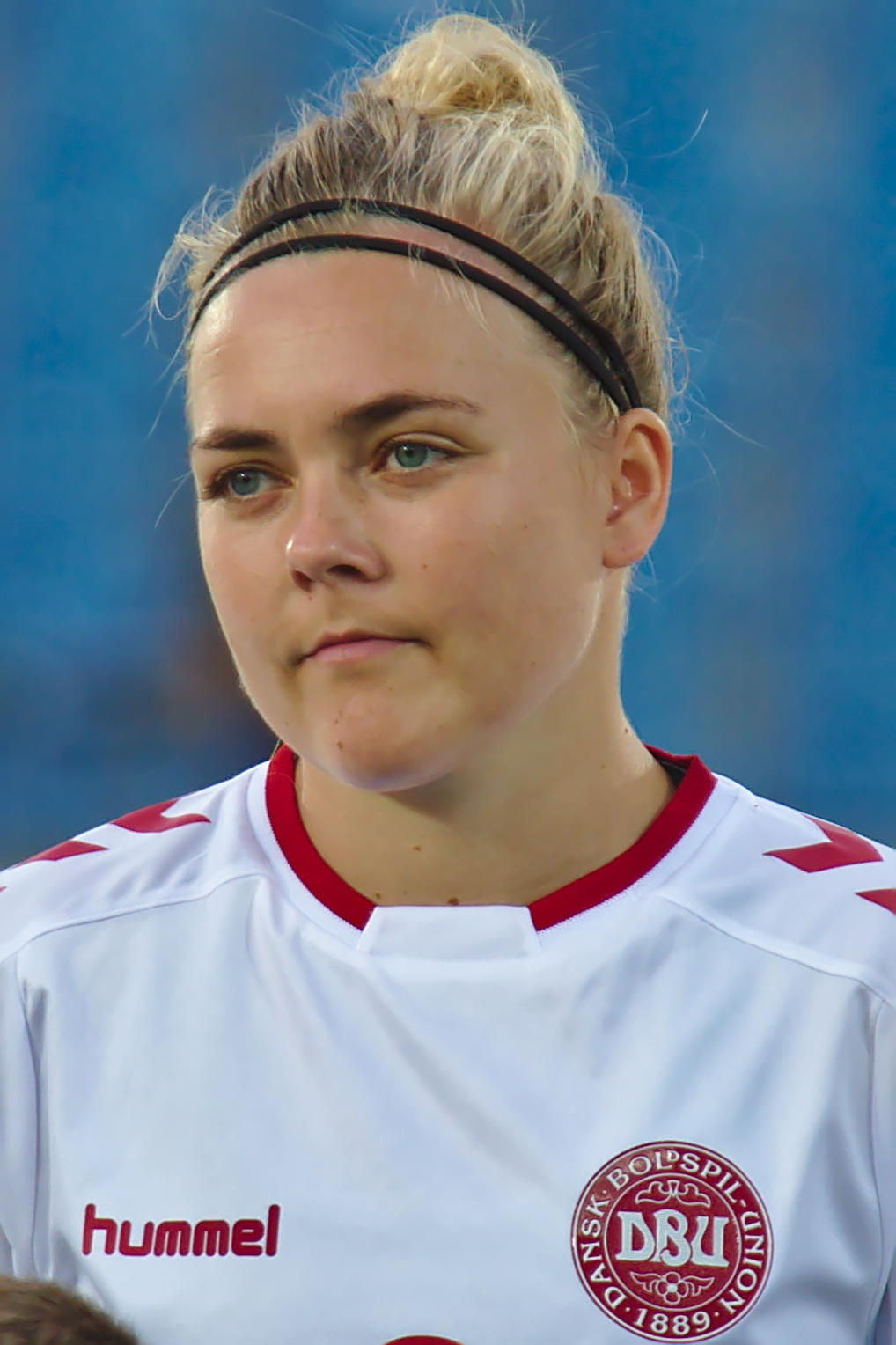
Nanna Christiansen was the season's top scorer with 13 goals for Brøndby.

Rank	Player	Club	Goals
1	(Denmark) Nanna Christiansen	Brøndby	18
2	(Denmark) Sanne Troelsgaard	KoldingQ	14
3	(Romania) Florentina Olar	Fortuna Hjørring	13
4	(Denmark) Nadia Nadim (Note: Nadim was on loan through the autumn and signed with Portland Thorns in January 2016.)	Fortuna Hjørring	12
4	(Denmark) Stine Sandbech	Brøndby	12
6	(Serbia) Nevena Damjanović	Fortuna Hjørring	10
7	(Denmark) Sofie Bloch	Brøndby	9
7	(Denmark) Sarah Dyrehauge	Fortuna Hjørring	9
7	(Finland) Nora Heroum	Fortuna Hjørring	9
7	(Denmark) Louise Lundsgaard	Brøndby	9
7	(Denmark) Annika Overby Hansen	OB	9
7	(Denmark) Nicoline Sørensen	Brøndby	9
