= 2023–24 Danish Women's League =

Danish women's football league season

Danish Women's League
- Season: 2023–24
- Dates: 25 August 2023 – 15 June 2026
- Champions: FC Nordsjælland; 1st title
- Relegated: AaB; FC Thy-Thisted Q
- Champions League (QR): Brøndby IF; FC Nordsjælland
- Matches: 86
- Goals: 205 (2.38 per match)
- Best player: Sarah Dyrehauge
- Top goalscorer: Emilía Kiær Ásgeirsdóttir (10 goals)
- Biggest home win: HB Køge 5–0 Kolding IF (16 September 2023)
- Biggest away win: Kolding IF 0–4 HB Køge (25 May 2024)
- Highest scoring: AGF 3–5 Fortuna Hjørring (4 May 2024)
- Longest winning run: 4 matches Brøndby IF; HB Køge
- Longest unbeaten run: 13 matches Fortuna Hjørring
- Longest winless run: 14 matches Kolding IF
- Longest losing run: 5 matches AaB; Kolding IF
- Only matches in the main league and championship play-offs are considered for the above statistics

The 2023–24 Danish Women's League is the 50th season in the top-flight of the Danish Women's Football League.

== Teams ==
There are 8 teams competing in the regular season of the league: the 6 teams from the previous season's championship play-offs, and the top two teams from the previous season's qualification play-offs. The two teams promoted from the qualification play-offs were AGF, keeping their top tier spot, and AaB, winning promotion from the 1st division, the latter replacing relegated team Sundby.

=== Changes ===
▲ from 2022–23 1st Division	▼ to 2023–24 1st Division
AaB	Sundby

=== Stadiums and locations ===
Locations of the 2024–25 Danish Women's League teams.

Team	Location	Stadium	Capacity
AGF	Århus	Ceres Park	19,433
Brøndby IF	Brøndby	Bane 2	2,000
Fortuna Hjørring	Hjørring	Nord Energi Arena	10,000
HB Køge	Køge	Capelli Sport Stadion	4,000
Kolding IF	Kolding	Kolding Stadium	10,000
FC Nordsjælland	Farum	Right to Dream Park	10,300
FC Thy-Thisted Q	Thisted	Sparekassen Thy Arena	3,000
AaB	Aalborg	Aalborg Portland Park	13,800

=== Personnel and kits ===
Team	Manager	Captain	Kit	Sponsor
AGF	(Denmark) Michael Schjønberg	(Denmark) Sarah Dyrehauge		
Brøndby	(Denmark) Per Nielsen	(Denmark) Nanna Christiansen	(Denmark) Hummel	
Fortuna Hjørring	(Denmark) Lene Terp	(Denmark)		
HB Køge	(Denmark) Kim Daugaard	(Denmark)		
Kolding	(Denmark) Allan Drost	(Denmark) Ida Guldager		
Nordsjælland	(England) Chris Sargeant	(Denmark)		
Thy-Thisted	(Denmark) Peer Lisdorf	(Denmark)		
AaB	(Faroe Islands) Claus Bech Jørgensen	(Denmark)		

== Regular season ==
=== League table ===
Pos	Team	Pld	W	D	L	GF	GA	GD	Pts	Qualification
1	Brøndby	14	9	1	4	23	15	+8	28	Qualification for the Championship play-offs
2	Nordsjælland	14	8	3	3	20	7	+13	27	Qualification for the Championship play-offs
3	HB Køge	14	8	3	3	18	8	+10	27	Qualification for the Championship play-offs
4	Fortuna Hjørring	14	6	4	4	17	9	+8	22	Qualification for the Championship play-offs
5	Kolding	14	6	2	6	14	16	−2	20	Qualification for the Championship play-offs
6	AGF	14	5	2	7	14	22	−8	17	Qualification for the Championship play-offs
7	Thy-Thisted	14	3	4	7	14	20	−6	13	Qualification for the Qualification play-offs
8	AaB	14	1	1	12	5	28	−23	4	Qualification for the Qualification play-offs

Source: Danish Football Association (in Danish)
Rules for classification: 1) Points; 2) Goal difference; 3) Goals scored; 4) Away goals scored; 5) Play-off (played on neutral ground if determining teams for different rounds); 6) Draw.

=== Results ===
Home \ Away	AGF	BRØ	HJØ	KØG	KOL	NOR	THI	AAB
AGF		0–2	2–2	2–4	2–0	1–1	1–3	2–0
Brøndby	2–1		1–0	2–0	1–2	2–1	2–3	4–2
Fortuna Hjørring	2–0	2–1		0–0	0–1	1–2	3–0	3–0
HB Køge	0–1	0–2	0–0		5–0	1–0	3–1	1–0
Kolding	4–0	0–1	0–0	0–2		2–0	1–1	1–0
Nordsjælland	2–0	3–0	2–0	0–0	1–0		3–0	3–0
Thy-Thisted	0–1	1–1	0–1	0–1	3–0	0–0		1–1
AaB	0–1	0–2	0–3	0–1	0–3	0–2	2–1	

Source: Danish Football Association (in Danish)
Legend: Blue = home team win; Yellow = draw; Red = away team win.

== Play-offs ==
=== Championship ===
Goals and points were transferred from the regular season in full and the combined points total is displayed in the table.

Pos	Team	Pld	W	D	L	GF	GA	GD	Pts	Qualification
1	FC Nordsjælland (C)	10	6	3	1	14	8	+6	48	Champions League qualifications
2	Brøndby IF	10	5	3	2	17	9	+8	46	Champions League qualifications
3	HB Køge	10	5	3	2	16	8	+8	45	
4	Fortuna Hjørring	10	3	4	3	11	10	+1	35	
5	AGF	10	3	1	6	18	23	−5	27	
6	KoldingQ	10	0	2	8	4	22	−18	22	

Source: Danish Football Association
Rules for classification: 1) Points; 2) Goal difference; 3) Number of goals scored; 4) Head-to-head points; 5) Head-to-head goal difference; 6) Head-to-head away goals scored
(C) Champions

==== Results ====
Home \ Away	AGF	BRØ	HJØ	KØG	KOL	NOR
AGF		2–1	3–5	3–4	3–0	1–1
Brøndby IF	4–0		0–0	1–1	3–0	1–1
Fortuna Hjørring	1–0	1–2		0–0	1–0	2–2
HB Køge	3–1	2–0	1–0		1–1	0–1
Kolding IF	2–4	0–2	1–1	0–4		0–1
FC Nordsjælland	2–1	2–3	1–0	1–0	2–0	

Source: DBU.dk
Legend: Blue = home team win; Yellow = draw; Red = away team win.

=== Qualification ===
Pos	Team	Pld	W	D	L	GF	GA	GD	Pts	Promotion or relegation
1	OB Q	10	8	2	0	27	3	+24	26	Promoted to Women's League
2	B.93	10	6	2	2	14	4	+10	20	Promoted to Women's League
3	AaB (R)	10	5	2	3	16	7	+9	17	Relegated to 1st Division
4	FC Thy-Thisted Q (R)	10	2	2	6	5	17	−12	8	Relegated to 1st Division
5	Østerbro IF	10	1	4	5	9	25	−16	7	Relegated to 1st Division
6	Næstved HG	10	1	2	7	6	21	−15	5	Relegated to 1st Division

Source: Danish Football Association
Rules for classification: 1) Points; 2) Goal difference; 3) Number of goals scored; 4) Head-to-head points; 5) Head-to-head goal difference; 6) Head-to-head away goals scored
(R) Relegated

==== Results ====
Home \ Away	B93	NÆS	ODE	THI	ØST	AAB
B.93		1–0	1–1	4–0	2–0	1–0
Næstved HG	0–2		0–2	0–1	1–0	1–1
OB Q	1–0	6–1		3–0	4–0	2–0
FC Thy-Thisted Q	0–2	1–0	0–0		2–2	1–3
Østerbro IF	1–1	3–3	1–7	1–0		1–1
AaB	1–0	4–0	0–1	2–0	4–0	

Source: DBU.dk
Legend: Blue = home team win; Yellow = draw; Red = away team win.

== Season statistics ==
The statistics cover the regular season and the championship play-offs.

=== Top scorers ===
Rank	Player	Club	Goals
1	(Iceland) Emilía Kiær Ásgeirsdóttir	Nordsjælland	10
2	(Denmark) Laura Faurskov	AGF	9
2	(Denmark) Cornelia Kramer	HB Køge	9
4	(Denmark) Sarah Dyrehauge	AGF	8
4	(Denmark) Benedicte Moss	Kolding	8
6	(Denmark) Sofie Hornemann	Brøndby	7
6	(Denmark) Anna Walter	Nordsjælland	7
8	(Denmark) Linnéa Borbye	Brøndby	6
8	(Denmark) Rikke Dybdahl	Fortuna Hjørring	6
8	(Nigeria) Joy Omewa	Fortuna Hjørring	6
8	(Denmark) Mathilde Rasmussen	AGF	6

=== Clean sheets ===
Rank	Player	Club	Clean sheets
1	(Denmark) Amanda Brunholt	Nordsjælland	13
1	(Denmark) Alberte Vingum	HB Køge	13
3	(Germany) Ann-Kathrin Dilfer	Brøndby	8
4	(Denmark) Sofie Grøn	Kolding	6
5	(Sweden) Hannah Kohl	Fortuna	4
5	(Romania) Andreea Părăluță	Fortuna	4
5	(Denmark) Freja Thisgaard	Fortuna	4
8	(Denmark) Marie Gade	AGF	3
8	(Denmark) Katrine Svane	AGF	3
10	(Denmark) Maja Bay Østergaard	Thy-Thisted	2

=== Discipline ===
==== Player ====
- Most yellow cards: 4
  - (Ghana) Jennifer Cudjoe (Nordsjælland)
  - (Denmark) Benedicte Moss (Kolding)
- Most red cards: 1
  - (Australia) Matilda McNamara (AGF)
  - (Spain) Saira Posada (AaB)

==== Club ====
- Most yellow cards: 22
  - Kolding IF
- Fewest yellow cards: 7
  - FC Thy-Thisted Q
- Most red cards: 1
  - AaB
  - AGF
- Fewest red cards: 0
  - 6 clubs

== Awards ==
=== Player of the Year ===
Player	Club	Ref.
(Denmark) Sarah Dyrehauge	AGF	

== See also ==
- 2023–24 Danish Women's 1st Division
- 2023–24 Danish Women's 2nd Division
- 2023–24 Danish Women's Cup
