= 2020–21 Danish Women's League =

Danish women's football league season

A-Liga
- Season: 2020–21
- Dates: 8 August 2020—5 June 2021
- Champions: HB Køge (1st title)
- Runner up: Brøndby
- Champions League (QR): HB Køge; Brøndby
- Matches: 86
- Goals: 280 (3.26 per match)
- Best player: Maja Bay Østergaard; Kaylan Marckese (6 clean sheets each)
- Top goalscorer: Kyra Carusa (18 goals)
- Biggest home win: Brøndby 6–0 Thy-Thisted (29 May 2021)
- Biggest away win: AaB 0–7 Brøndby (13 March 2021)
- Highest scoring: HB Køge 7–2 AaB (9 August 2020)
- Longest winning run: 6 matches Brøndby
- Longest unbeaten run: 9 matches Brøndby
- Longest winless run: 14 matches AaB
- Longest losing run: 9 matches AaB
- Only matches in the regular season and the championship play-offs are covered in the statistics

The 2020–21 Danish Women's League was the 47th season of the top-flight of the Danish Women's Football League.

== Format ==
The main round of the league is played in autumn as a double round-robin tournament between the 8 participating teams, where each team plays against each other both at home and away.

The six best placed teams qualify for spring championship play-offs. The finals consist once again of a double round-robin tournament among the six participating teams. Every team received additional points before the start of the play-offs: 10 for first placed, 8 for second placed, etc. Thy-Thisted, as the last placed, did not receive additional points.

The two bottom ranked teams instead play in qualification play-offs, a double round-robin tournament with the top four teams of 2020–21 Danish Women's 1st Division for two spots in 2021–22 Danish Women's League. No points are added in the qualification play-offs.

== Teams ==
There were 8 teams competing in the regular season of the league: the 6 teams from the previous season's championship play-offs, and the top 2 teams from the previous season's qualification play-offs. The two teams promoted from the qualification play-offs were AaB and HB Køge, winning promotion from the B-Liga, replacing relegated teams BSF and OdenseQ.

This was HB Køge's first season in the top-flight.

=== Changes ===
▲ from 2019–20 Danish Women's 1st Division	▼ to 2020–21 Danish Women's 1st Division
HB Køge; AaB	BSF; OdenseQ

=== Stadiums and locations ===
Location of clubs for the 2020–21 season

Team	Location	Stadium	Capacity
AGF	Aarhus	Vejlby Stadium (Note: Some matches were played at Aarhus Stadium.)	5,200
Brøndby IF	Brøndby	Brøndby Stadium	29,000
Fortuna Hjørring	Hjørring	Nord Energi Arena	7,500
HB Køge	Køge	Capelli Sport Stadion	4,000
KoldingQ	Kolding	Fynske Bank Arena	3,000
FC Nordsjælland	Farum	Right to Dream Park	10,300
FC Thy-Thisted Q	Thisted	Sparekassen Thy Arena	3,000
AaB	Aalborg	AaB Facilities (Note: Some matches were played at Aalborg Portland Park.)	1,000

=== Personnel and kits ===
Team	Manager	Captain	Kit	Sponsor
AGF	(Denmark) Steen Petterson	(Denmark) Mathilde Kruse (Note: Kruse served as captain in the absence of injured Christina Ravn.)	(Denmark) Hummel	(Denmark) Arbejdernes Landsbank
Brøndby	(Denmark) Per Nielsen	(Denmark) Nanna Christiansen	(Denmark) Hummel	(Denmark) Red Barnet
Fortuna Hjørring	(Sweden) Elena Sadiku (interim)	(Denmark) Sara Thrige	(United States) Nike, Inc.	(Denmark) Dana Cup
HB Køge	(Denmark) Peer Lisdorf	(Denmark) Maria Uhre	(United States) Capelli Sport	(Denmark) Spar Nord
KoldingQ	(Denmark) Anders Jensen	(Denmark) Louise Eriksen	(Germany) Adidas	(Denmark) Fynske Bank
Nordsjælland	(Denmark) Brian Sørensen	(Denmark) Catrine Gryholt	(United States) Nike, Inc.	(Germany) DHL
Thy-Thisted Q	(Denmark) Allan Drost	(Denmark) Matilde Kjeldgaard	(Germany) Puma	(Denmark) Thisted Forsikring
AaB	(Denmark) Claus Larsen (interim)	(Denmark) Line Andersen		

=== Managerial changes ===
Team	Outgoing manager	Manner of departure	Date of vacancy	Position	Incoming manager	Date of appointment
Thy-Thisted Q	(Denmark) Torben Overgaard	Sacked	30 December 2020	6th	(Denmark) Allan Drost	8 November 2020
AaB	(Denmark) Martin Dale Stephens	Sacked	18 April 2021	4th (Note: In qualification play-offs relegation spot)	(Denmark) Claus Larsen (interim)	18 April 2021
Fortuna Hjørring	(Denmark) Niclas Hougaard	Sacked	19 April 2021	3rd	(Sweden) Elena Sadiku (interim)	19 April 2021

== Regular season ==
=== League table ===
Pos	Team	Pld	W	D	L	GF	GA	GD	Pts	Qualification
1	HB Køge	14	9	2	3	35	16	+19	29	Championship play-offs
2	Brøndby	14	9	2	3	30	16	+14	29	Championship play-offs
3	Fortuna Hjørring	14	9	1	4	33	16	+17	28	Championship play-offs
4	KoldingQ	14	8	1	5	32	17	+15	25	Championship play-offs
5	Nordsjælland	14	6	3	5	21	22	−1	21	Championship play-offs
6	FC Thy-Thisted Q	14	4	4	6	18	22	−4	16	Championship play-offs
7	AGF	14	4	0	10	13	31	−18	12	Qualification play-offs
8	AaB	14	0	1	13	5	47	−42	1	Qualification play-offs

Source: Danish Football Association (in Danish)
Rules for classification: 1) Points; 2) Goal difference; 3) Goals scored; 4) Away goals scored; 5) Play-off (played on neutral ground if determining teams for different rounds); 6) Draw.

=== Results ===
Home \ Away	AGF	BRØ	HJØ	KØG	KOL	NOR	THI	AAB
AGF		1–4	0–2	1–4	0–1	0–1	0–1	2–0
Brøndby	0–1		2–1	1–0	3–2	0–0	4–0	3–0
Fortuna Hjørring	5–1	3–1		2–1	1–0	5–1	0–2	4–0
HB Køge	3–0	5–0	1–0		3–1	2–0	2–1	7–2
Kolding	5–1	1–2	3–0	3–3		2–1	3–1	5–0
Nordsjælland	4–0	1–1	1–4	3–1	1–5		2–0	2–0
FC Thy-Thisted Q	1–3	1–2	2–2	1–1	1–0	2–2		4–0
AaB	0–3	0–7	1–4	1–2	0–1	0–2	1–1	

Source: Danish Football Association (in Danish)
Legend: Blue = home team win; Yellow = draw; Red = away team win.

== Play-offs ==
=== Championship ===
Pos	Team	Pld	W	D	L	GF	GA	GD	Pts	Qualification
1	HB Køge (C)	10	8	1	1	22	7	+15	35	Champions League QR
2	Brøndby	10	7	1	2	26	9	+17	30	Champions League QR
3	Fortuna Hjørring	10	4	2	4	13	17	−4	20	
4	KoldingQ	10	3	2	5	13	12	+1	15	
5	Nordsjælland	10	3	0	7	14	24	−10	11	
6	FC Thy-Thisted Q	10	2	0	8	5	24	−19	6	

Source: Danish Football Association (in Danish)
Rules for classification: 1) Points; 2) Goal difference; 3) Goals scored; 4) Away goals scored; 5) Play-off (played on neutral ground if determining teams for different rounds); 6) Draw.
(C) Champions

==== Results ====
Home \ Away	BRØ	HJØ	KØG	KOL	NOR	THI
Brøndby		4–1	1–2	0–0	3–1	6–0
Fortuna Hjørring	1–2		1–2	1–1	0–5	2–1
HB Køge	3–1	1–1		3–0	5–0	3–0
Kolding	1–2	0–1	3–1		4–1	4–1
Nordsjælland	0–6	1–3	0–1	1–0		5–1
FC Thy-Thisted Q	0–1	0–2	0–1	1–0	1–0	

Source: Danish Football Association (in Danish)
Legend: Blue = home team win; Yellow = draw; Red = away team win.

=== Qualification ===
Pos	Team	Pld	W	D	L	GF	GA	GD	Pts	Qualification
1	AGF	10	8	2	0	29	9	+20	26	2021–22 Women's League
2	AaB	10	6	2	2	11	7	+4	20	2021–22 Women's League
3	Odense Q	10	5	3	2	23	13	+10	18	2021–22 1st Division
4	B.93	10	3	0	7	15	20	−5	9	2021–22 1st Division
5	ASA	10	2	2	6	13	24	−11	8	2021–22 1st Division
6	Sundby	10	1	1	8	11	29	−18	4	2021–22 1st Division

Source: Danish Football Association (in Danish)
Rules for classification: 1) Points; 2) Goal difference; 3) Number of goals scored; 4) Head-to-head points; 5) Head-to-head goal difference; 6) Head-to-head away goals scored

==== Results ====
Home \ Away	AGF	ASA	B93	ODE	SUN	AAB
AGF		2–0	3–2	4–1	1–0	0–0
ASA	0–4		2–0	2–2	4–3	0–1
B.93	1–6	4–1		1–2	0–2	0–1
Odense Q	1–1	5–2	1–2		3–0	0–0
Sundby	3–5	1–1	1–5	0–6		1–3
AaB	1–3	2–1	1–0	1–2	1–0	

Source: Danish Football Association (in Danish)
Legend: Blue = home team win; Yellow = draw; Red = away team win.

== Season statistics ==
Only matches in the regular season and championship play-offs are covered in the statistics.

=== Top scorers ===
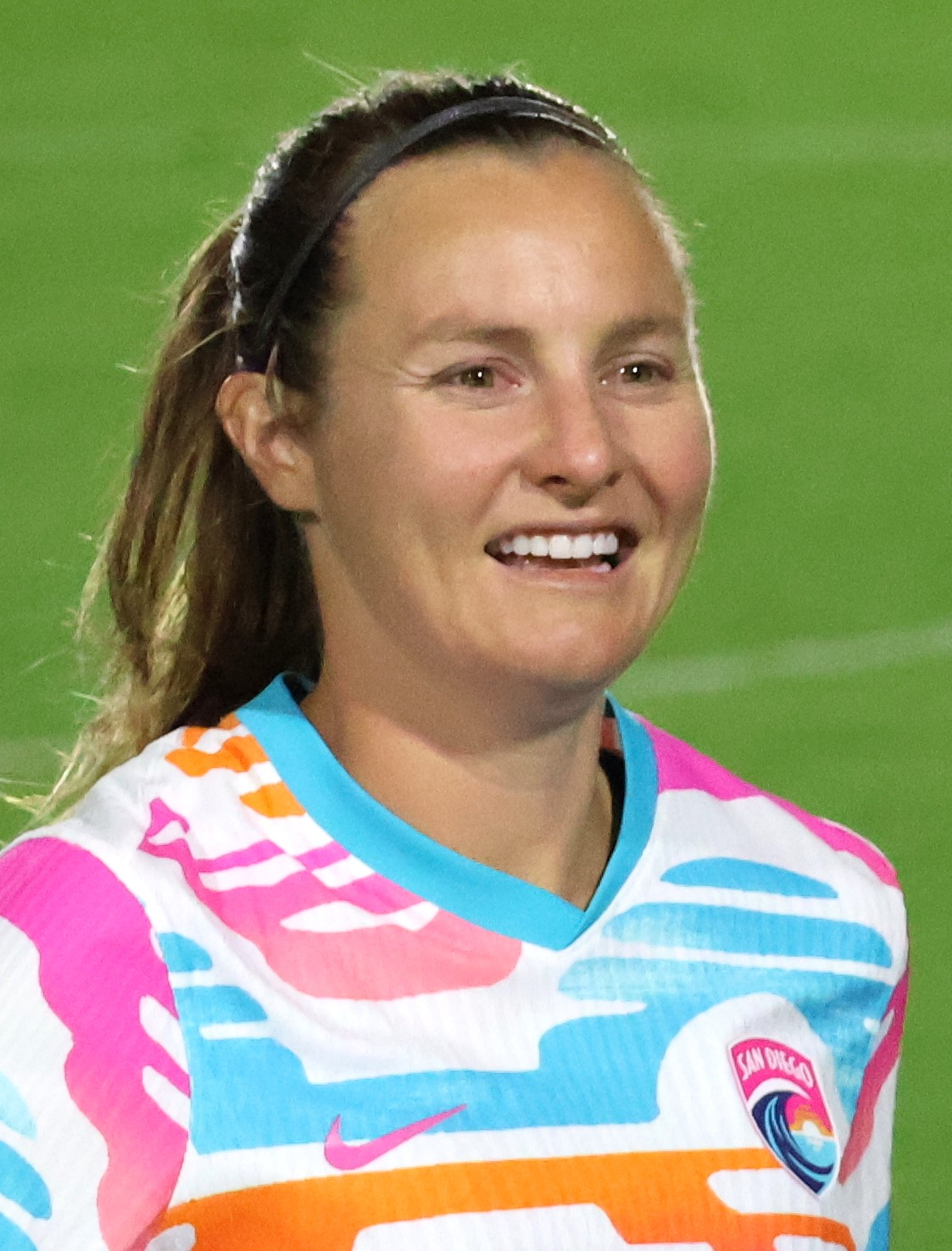
Kyra Carusa was the season's top scorer with 18 goals for HB Køge.

Rank	Player	Club	Goals
1	(Republic of Ireland) Kyra Carusa	HB Køge	18
2	(Denmark) Nanna Christiansen	Brøndby	16
3	(Denmark) Olivia Holdt	Fortuna Hjørring	15
4	(Denmark) Agnete Nielsen	Brøndby	13
5	(Denmark) Cecilie Fløe	KoldingQ	9
6	(Denmark) Rikke Dybdahl	Thy-Thisted Q	8
6	(United States) Maddie Pokorny	HB Køge	8
8	(Denmark) Camilla Kur Larsen	Nordsjælland	7
8	(Denmark) Lærke Bjergager Niklasson	HB Køge	7
8	(Denmark) Emma Snerle	Fortuna Hjørring	7

=== Clean sheets ===
Rank	Player	Club	Clean sheets
1	(Denmark) Maja Bay Østergaard	Thy-Thisted	6
1	(United States) Kaylan Marckese	HB Køge	6
3	(Brazil) Taty Amaro	Nordsjælland	5
3	(Denmark) Naja Bahrenscheer	Brøndby	5
5	(Denmark) Katrine Abel	Brøndby	3
5	(Denmark) Lene Christensen	KoldingQ	3
5	(United States) Adelaide Gay	Nordsjælland	3
5	(Denmark) Katrine Svane	AGF	3
5	(Denmark) Freja Thisgaard	Fortuna Hjørring	3
10	(United States) Emily Boyd	HB Køge	2
10	(Denmark) Line Geltzer Johansen	Fortuna Hjørring	2
10	(Denmark) Mia Reedtz Olesen	KoldingQ	2

== See also ==
- 2020–21 Danish Women's 1st Division
- 2020–21 Danish Women's Cup
- 2020–21 Champions League
