= 2026–27 B-Liga =

B-Liga
- Season: 2026–27
- Dates: 15 August 2026—June 2027
- Matches: 56
- Goals: 202 (3.61 per match)
- Best player: Anne Hougaard
- Top goalscorer: Luna Lagerbon Bruun (10 goals)
- Best goalkeeper: Sofie Fly (5 clean sheets)
- Biggest home win: Viborg FF 6–1 AaB (24 October 2026); Næstved HG 6–1 Esbjerg (31 October 2026); Sundby 5–0 FC Thy-Thisted Q (7 November 2026)
- Biggest away win: AaB 0–6 Østerbro (22 August 2026)
- Highest scoring: Thy-Thisted 3–6 Sundby (29 August 2026); AaB 3–6 Thy-Thisted (6 September 2026)
- Longest winning run: 10 matches B.93
- Longest unbeaten run: 10 matches B.93
- Longest winless run: 14 matches Esbjerg
- Longest losing run: 13 matches Esbjerg
- Only matches in the regular season are covered in the statistics

The 2026–27 B-Liga is the 35th season of the second tier of the Danish Women's Football League, and the 4th season with the current format of eight teams.

The Næstved v AaB match was scheduled to be played again following a complaint from AaB that Næstved had used four breaks in play for substitutions, where only three breaks in play are allowed. Næstved chose not to file an appeal. The match took place 15 August 2026 and the re-match was scheduled for 9 October 2026, however AaB cancelled on the day and Næstved was awarded the 3 points.

== Format ==
The main round of the league is played in autumn as a double round-robin tournament between the 8 participating teams, where each team plays against each other both at home and away.

The four best placed teams qualify for spring A-Liga qualification play-offs. The qualification play-offs consist of a double round-robin tournament with six participating teams.

The four bottom-ranked teams play the B-Liga qualification play-offs, a double round-robin tournament with the top two teams (east and west) from 2026–27 C-Liga for four spots in 2027–28 B-Liga. The scores from the main league are not carried over into the qualification tournament.

== Teams ==
As of this season the league structure has changed to incorporate two further teams in A-Liga for a total of 10 teams, and reduce the C-Liga team total from 14 to 12 teams. B-Liga remains unchanged, however no teams were relegated from the 2025–26 B-Liga. Sundby and Viborg won promotion from the 2025–26 C-Liga, while ASA and Copenhagen left the division through promotion to the 2026–27 A-Liga.

=== Changes ===
ENTERING B-LIGA		EXITING B-LIGA	
▲ from 2025–26 C-Liga	▼ from 2025–26 A-Liga	▲ to 2026–27 A-Liga	▼ to 2026–27 C-Liga
Sundby; Viborg	None due to expansion	Copenhagen; ASA Fodbold	None due to expansion

=== Stadiums and locations ===
Locations of the 2026–27 B-Liga teams.

Team	Location	Stadium	Capacity
B.93	Østerbro	Østerbro Stadium	4,400
Esbjerg fB	Esbjerg	Blue Water Arena (Note: Some matches to be played at the Athletics Stadium, and at Vestjysk Bank Stadium)	16,942
Næstved HG	Næstved	MTM service Park	10,000
Sundby	Copenhagen	Kløvermarken Sports Facilities	
Thy-Thisted	Thisted	Sparkassen Thy Arena	3,000
Viborg	Viborg	Liseborgcentret	1,500
Østerbro	Østerbro	Valby Idrætspark	4,400
AaB	Aalborg	AaB Anlæg (Note: Some matches to be played at Sparekassen Danmark Park)	1,000

=== Personnel and kits ===
Team	Manager	Captain	Kit	Sponsor
B.93	(Denmark) Søren Fjorting	(Denmark) Freja Abildå	(Germany) Puma	(Denmark) Depanneur
Esbjerg	(Denmark) Michael Schjønberg	(Denmark) Freya Winther	(Denmark) Hummel	(United States) McDonald's
Næstved	(Denmark) Frederik S. Guld	(Denmark) Louise Engholm	(Germany) Puma	(Denmark) Spar Nord
Sundby	(Denmark) Jan Kristensen	(Denmark) Trine Langhorn	(Germany) Adidas	(Denmark) Bruno Jacobsen
Thy-Thisted	(Denmark) Michael Lauridsen (interim)	(Denmark) Molli Plasmann	(Denmark) Select Sport	(Denmark) Sparekassen Thy
Viborg	(Denmark) Jakob Glerup	(Denmark) Frida Nørgaard	(United States) Capelli Sport	(Denmark) VillaVilla
Østerbro	(Denmark) Lasse Lund Larsen	(Denmark) Janne Brouer	(Germany) Adidas	—N/a
AaB	(Spain) Jessica Rodríguez	(Denmark) Anne-Laura Jakobsen	(Italy) Macron	(Denmark) Spar Nord (H) Nykredit (A)

=== Managerial changes ===
Team	Outgoing manager	Manner of departure	Date of vacancy	Rank	Incoming manager	Date of appointment
AaB	(Denmark) Martin Schjødt	Resigned	1 July 2026	Pre-season	(Denmark) Jessica Rodríguez	1 July 2026
Næstved HG	(Denmark) Louise & Arne Ringsing	Resigned	1 July 2026	Pre-season	(Denmark) Anders Buchardt & Adam Barkhuus (interim)	n/a
Østerbro	(Denmark) Michael "Pixi" Andersen	Resigned	3 July 2026	Pre-season	(Denmark) Lasse Lund Larsen	6 July 2026
Næstved HG	(Denmark) Anders Buchardt & Adam Barkhuus	End of interim spell	1 October 2026	4th	(Denmark) Frederik S. Guld	19 September 2026
Thy-Thisted	(Denmark) Stefan Vendelbo	Resigned	1 November 2026	6th	(Denmark) Michael Lauridsen (interim)	TBA
Esbjerg fB	(Denmark) Carsten Hilding	Sacked	9 November 2026	8th	(Denmark) Michael Schjønberg	9 November 2026

== Regular season ==
=== League table ===
Pos	Team	Pld	W	D	L	GF	GA	GD	Pts	Qualification
1	B.93	14	12	0	2	30	16	+14	36	A-Liga qualification play-offs
2	Sundby	14	9	2	3	35	16	+19	29	A-Liga qualification play-offs
3	Østerbro	14	9	1	4	28	15	+13	28	B-liga play-offs
4	Næstved HG	14	7	2	5	26	13	+13	23	B-liga play-offs
5	Viborg FF	14	6	4	4	22	14	+8	22	B-liga play-offs
6	Thy-Thisted	14	4	2	8	29	40	−11	14	B-liga play-offs
7	AaB	14	2	2	10	17	44	−27	8	B-liga play-offs
8	Esbjerg	14	0	1	13	15	44	−29	1	B-liga play-offs

Source: Danish Football Association (in Danish)
Rules for classification: 1) Points; 2) Goal difference; 3) Goals scored; 4) Head-to-head points; 5) Head-to-head goal difference; 6) Play-off (played on neutral ground if determining teams for different rounds); 7) Draw.

=== Results ===
Home \ Away	B93	EFB	NÆS	SUN	THI	VIB	ØST	AAB
B.93		3–2	2–1	3–1	3–2	2–1	2–1	4–0
Esbjerg	1–2		1–2	1–5	1–3	0–3	1–3	2–4
Næstved HG	0–1	6–1		1–1	2–1	1–2	0–1	3–0 (Note: Rematch was cancelled by AaB, thus awarding Næstved HG the 3 points by default.)
Sundby	2–0	2–1	0–1		5–0	2–0	2–0	2–1
Thy-Thisted	1–2	3–3	0–4	3–6		0–3	3–2	3–3
Viborg FF	0–2	2–0	1–1	1–1	1–3		1–1	6–1
Østerbro	3–1	4–1	1–0	3–2	2–1	0–1		1–0
AaB	1–3	2–0	1–4	1–4	3–6	0–0	0–6	

Source: Danish Football Association (in Danish)
Legend: Blue = home team win; Yellow = draw; Red = away team win.

== Play-offs ==
=== Table ===
Pos	Team	Pld	W	D	L	GF	GA	GD	Pts	Qualification
1	Esbjerg	0	0	0	0	0	0	0	0	2027–28 B-Liga
2	Fredensborg	0	0	0	0	0	0	0	0	2027–28 B-Liga
3	Næstved HG	0	0	0	0	0	0	0	0	2027–28 B-Liga
4	Silkeborg Q	0	0	0	0	0	0	0	0	2027–28 B-Liga
5	Thy-Thisted	0	0	0	0	0	0	0	0	2027–28 B-Liga
6	Viborg FF	0	0	0	0	0	0	0	0	2027–28 B-Liga
7	Østerbro	0	0	0	0	0	0	0	0	2027–28 C-Liga
8	AaB	0	0	0	0	0	0	0	0	2027–28 C-Liga

Rules for classification: 1) Points; 2) Goal difference; 3) Goals scored; 4) Head-to-head points; 5) Head-to-head goal difference; 6) Play-off (played on neutral ground if determining teams for different rounds); 7) Draw.

=== Results ===
Home \ Away	EFB	FRE	NÆS	SIL	THI	VIB	ØST	AAB
Esbjerg								
Fredensborg								
Næstved HG								
Silkeborg Q								
Thy-Thisted								
Viborg FF								
Østerbro								
AaB								

Legend: Blue = home team win; Yellow = draw; Red = away team win.

== Season statistics ==
Note that only matches in the regular season are covered in the statistics.

=== Top scorers ===
Rank	Player	Club	Goals
1	(Denmark) Luna Lagerbon Bruun	B.93	10
2	(Denmark) Mathilde Gaarn	Thy-Thisted	9
2	(Denmark) Emilie Langhorn	Sundby	9
4	(Denmark) Sissel Bøje	Sundby	8
5	(Puerto Rico) Karina Socarrás	AaB	6
6	(Denmark) Cecilie Bergholt	Østerbro	5
6	(Denmark) Camilla Hansen	Sundby	5
6	(Denmark) Anne Hougaard	Viborg FF	5
6	(Denmark) Kristine Neumann	Næstved HG	5
10	(Denmark) Agnes Fog-Tonnesen	Østerbro	4
10	(Italy) Marta Grosso	Næstved HG	4
10	(Denmark) Anne-Laura Jakobsen	AaB	4
10	(Denmark) Janni Nystrup	Thy-Thisted Q	4

==== Hat-tricks ====
Player	Club	Against	Result	Date	Round	Ref.
(Denmark) Rose Blinge	Næstved HG	Thy-Thisted	0–4 (A)	26 September 2026	7	

=== Clean sheets ===
Rank	Player	Club	Clean sheets
1	(Denmark) Sofie Fly	Viborg FF	5
2	(Denmark) Vicktoria Bjerregaard	Sundby	4
3	(Denmark) Trine Gaur	Østerbro	3
3	(Denmark) Christina Kese	Næstved HG	3
5	(Denmark) Emmeline Andersen	AaB	2
6	(Denmark) Malou Huge	Østerbro	1
6	(Denmark) Alma Meier	B.93	1
6	(Denmark) Signe Munk	B.93	1
6	(Denmark) Mira Pastoft	B.93	1

=== Discipline ===
==== Player ====
- Most yellow cards: 5
  - (Denmark) Doha Bouraba (Sundby)
- Most red cards: 1
  - (Denmark) Karoline Kamp (Esbjerg)

==== Club ====
- Most yellow cards: 18
  - Sundby
  - Thy-Thisted Q
- Fewest yellow cards: 6
  - Næstved HG
  - Østerbro
- Most red cards: 1
  - Esbjerg fB
- Fewest red cards: 0
  - 7 clubs

== Awards ==
=== Player of the Autumn ===
Player	Club	Ref.
(Denmark) Anne Hougaard	Viborg FF	

== See also ==
- 2026–27 A-Liga
- 2026–27 C-Liga
- 2026–27 Danish Women's Cup
