= 2024–25 Danish Women's League =

Danish women's football league season

Gjensidige Women's League
- Season: 2024–25
- Dates: 9 August 2024 – 14 June 2025
- Champions: Fortuna Hjørring; 12th title
- Relegated: B.93
- Champions League (QR): Fortuna Hjørring; FC Nordsjælland
- Europa Cup (QR): HB Køge
- Matches: 86
- Goals: 228 (2.65 per match)
- Best player: Joy Omewa
- Top goalscorer: Joy Omewa (18 goals)
- Biggest home win: HB Køge 5–0 Kolding IF (20 October 2024); HB Køge 5–0 B.93 (23 November 2024)
- Biggest away win: B.93 0–4 Fortuna Hjørring (20 October 2024); AGF 0–4 HB Køge (21 April 2025)
- Highest scoring: Kolding IF 2–5 Fortuna Hjørring (10 November 2024)
- Longest winning run: 5 matches Fortuna Hjørring
- Longest unbeaten run: 18 matches Fortuna Hjørring
- Longest winless run: 12 matches Kolding IF
- Longest losing run: 5 matches AGF; B.93; Kolding IF
- Only matches in the regular season and the championship play-offs are covered in the statistics

The 2024–25 Danish Women's League (known also as Gjensidige Women's League for sponsorship reasons) was the 51st season of the top-flight of the Danish Women's Football League.

This was the last season before the league was rebranded as the A-Liga.

== Format ==
The main round of the league is played in autumn as a double round-robin tournament between the 8 participating teams, where each team plays against each other both at home and away.

The six best placed teams qualify for spring championship finals. The finals consist once again of a double round-robin tournament among the six participating teams. The scores from the main round carry over into the championship finals.

The two bottom ranked teams instead play in qualification league, a double round-robin tournament with the top four teams of the 2024–25 Kvinde 1. Division for two spots in the 2025–26 A-Liga. The scores from the main league are not carried over into the qualification tournament.

== Teams ==
There are 8 teams competing in the regular season of the league: the 6 teams from the previous season's championship play-offs, and the top two teams from the previous season's qualification play-offs. The two teams promoted from the qualification play-offs were B.93 and OB Q, both winning promotion from the B-Liga.

=== Changes ===
▲ from 2023–24 1st Division	▼ to 2024–25 1st Division
B.93; OB Q	FC Thy-Thisted Q AaB

=== Stadiums and locations ===
Locations of the 2024–25 Danish Women's League teams.

Team	Location	Stadium	Capacity
AGF	Århus	Ceres Park (Note: Some matches played at Fynske Bank Arena (artificial pitch))	19,433
B.93	Copenhagen	Østerbro Stadium	4,400
Brøndby	Brøndby	Pitch 2, Brøndby Stadium	2,000
Fortuna Hjørring	Hjørring	Nord Energi Arena	10,000
HB Køge	Køge	Capelli Sport Stadium	4,000
Kolding IF	Kolding	Kolding Stadium	10,000
Nordsjælland	Farum	Right to Dream Park	10,300
OB Q	Odense	Nature Energy Park	15,790

=== Personnel and kits ===
Team	Manager	Captain	Kit	Sponsor
AGF	(Denmark) Marie Lynge Olesen & Søren Holm (interim)	(Denmark) Sarah Dyrehauge		
B.93	(Denmark) Christian Falk			
Brøndby	(Norway) Bengt Sæternes	(Denmark) Julie Tavlo		
Fortuna Hjørring	(Denmark) Lene Terp	(Romania) Florentina Olar		
HB Køge	(Denmark) Kim Daugaard	(Denmark) Maria Uhre		
Kolding	(Denmark) Lasse Skovhøj	(Denmark) Ida Guldager		
Nordsjælland	(England) Chris Sargeant	(Australia) Winonah Heatley (Denmark) Nikoline Dudek		
OB	(Denmark) Peer Lisdorf	(Denmark) Signe Boysen		

=== Managerial changes ===
Team	Outgoing manager	Manner of departure	Date of vacancy	Pos.	Incoming manager	Date of appointment
Brøndby	(Denmark) Per Nielsen	Sacked	25 June 2024	Pre-season	(Norway) Bengt Sæternes	23 August 2024
Kolding IF	(Denmark) Allan Drost	Sacked	29 October 2024	8th	(Denmark) Lasse Skovhøj	29 October 2024
OB Q	(Denmark) Kristian Mørch	Mutual consent	17 November 2024	4th	(Denmark) Jeppe Abel & Thomas Johansen (interim)	17 November 2024
B.93	(Denmark) Peer Lisdorf	Mutual consent	2 December 2024	7th	(Denmark) Christian Falk	5 December 2024
OB Q	(Denmark) Jeppe Abel & Thomas Johansen	End of interim spell	1 February 2025	4th	(Denmark) Peer Lisdorf	30 December 2024
AGF	(Denmark) Michael Schjønberg	Signed by 07 Vestur	15 May 2025	6th	(Denmark) Marie Lynge Olesen & Søren Holm (interim)	15 May 2025

== Regular season ==
=== League table ===
Pos	Team	Pld	W	D	L	GF	GA	GD	Pts	Qualification
1	Fortuna Hjørring	14	11	3	0	36	10	+26	36	Championship play-offs
2	Nordsjælland	14	10	0	4	26	13	+13	30	Championship play-offs
3	Brøndby	14	8	3	3	24	11	+13	27	Championship play-offs
4	OB Q	14	4	6	4	19	17	+2	18	Championship play-offs
5	HB Køge	14	5	2	7	22	13	+9	17	Championship play-offs
6	AGF	14	5	1	8	11	22	−11	16	Championship play-offs
7	B.93	14	2	2	10	10	36	−26	8	Qualification play-offs
8	Kolding IF	14	1	3	10	11	37	−26	6	Qualification play-offs

Source: Danish Football Association
Rules for classification: 1) Points; 2) Goal difference; 3) Goals scored; 4) Points head-to-head 5) Goals head-to-head 6) Play-off (played on neutral ground if determining teams for different rounds); 6) Draw.

=== Results ===
Home \ Away	AGF	B93	BRØ	HJØ	KØG	KOL	NOR	ODE
AGF		0–1	2–3	0–3	1–0	2–1	0–2	0–2
B.93	0–1		0–3	0–4	0–3	3–0	1–4	1–4
Brøndby	0–1	4–0		0–3	1–0	0–0	3–0	3–0
Fortuna Hjørring	3–0	2–0	2–2		2–1	4–1	2–1	2–2
HB Køge	4–1	5–0	0–1	0–0		5–0	1–2	0–1
Kolding IF	2–1	2–2	0–2	2–5	1–2		0–1	2–2
Nordsjælland	1–2	2–0	3–2	0–2	2–0	4–0		2–0
OB Q	0–0	2–2	0–0	1–2	1–1	4–0	0–2	

Updated to match(es) played on 15 June 2025. Source: Danish Football Association
Legend: Blue = home team win; Yellow = draw; Red = away team win.

== Play-offs ==
=== Championship ===
Goals and points were transferred from the regular season in full and the combined total is displayed in the points column.

Pos	Team	Pld	W	D	L	GF	GA	GD	Pts	Qualification
1	Fortuna Hjørring (C)	10	4	4	2	16	7	+9	52	Champions League QR
2	Nordsjælland	10	2	3	5	8	13	−5	39	Champions League QR
3	HB Køge	10	6	3	1	15	7	+8	38	Europa Cup QR
4	Brøndby	10	2	5	3	8	10	−2	38	
5	OB Q	10	3	3	4	11	16	−5	30	
6	AGF	10	3	2	5	11	16	−5	27	

Source: Danish Football Association (in Danish)
Rules for classification: 1) Points; 2) Goal difference; 3) Goals scored; 4) Points head-to-head 5) Goals head-to-head 6) Play-off (played on neutral ground if determining teams for different rounds); 6) Draw.
(C) Champions

==== Results ====
Home \ Away	AGF	BRØ	HJØ	KØG	NOR	ODE
AGF		2–1	2–2	0–4	0–0	0–1
Brøndby IF	1–2		1–1	1–3	1–1	1–0
Fortuna Hjørring	1–0	0–0		2–0	0–0	1–2
HB Køge	2–1	0–0	1–0		3–2	0–0
Nordsjælland	1–2	0–1	0–3	0–1		2–1
OB Q	3–2	1–1	1–6	1–1	1–2	

Updated to match(es) played on 15 June 2025. Source: DBU.dk
Legend: Blue = home team win; Yellow = draw; Red = away team win.

=== Qualification ===
Pos	Team	Pld	W	D	L	GF	GA	GD	Pts	Promotion or relegation
1	Midtjylland (P)	10	7	2	1	18	7	+11	23	2025–26 A-Liga
2	Kolding IF	10	7	1	2	36	12	+24	22	2025–26 A-Liga
3	ASA	10	5	4	1	18	12	+6	19	2025–26 B-Liga
4	Østerbro	10	2	2	6	9	21	−12	8	2025–26 B-Liga
5	B.93 (R)	10	1	3	6	10	20	−10	6	2025–26 B-Liga
6	Thy-Thisted	10	1	2	7	8	27	−19	5	2025–26 B-Liga

Source: DBU.dk
Rules for classification: 1) Points; 2) Goal difference; 3) Goals scored; 4) Points head-to-head 5) Goals head-to-head 6) Play-off (played on neutral ground if determining teams for different rounds); 6) Draw.
(P) Promoted; (R) Relegated

==== Results ====
Home \ Away	ASA	B93	KOL	MID	THI	ØST
ASA		1–0	2–2	1–1	3–1	4–1
B.93	1–1		1–5	0–1	0–0	4–1
Kolding IF	4–2	3–1		0–1	9–1	2–0
Midtjylland	1–1	4–1	2–1		2–0	1–2
Thy-Thisted	1–2	3–1	0–5	1–3		1–1
Østerbro	0–1	1–1	2–5	0–2	1–0	

Source: DBU.dk
Legend: Blue = home team win; Yellow = draw; Red = away team win.

== Season statistics ==
Only matches in the regular season and championship play-offs are covered in the statistics.

=== Top scorers ===
Rank	Player	Club	Goals
1	(Nigeria) Joy Omewa	Fortuna Hjørring	22
2	(United States) Olivia Garcia	HB Køge	18
3	(Denmark) Alma Aagaard	Nordsjælland	11
3	(Belarus) Anastasiya Pobegaylo	Fortuna Hjørring	11
5	(Denmark) Nanna Christiansen	Brøndby	10
6	(Iceland) Emilía Kiær Ásgeirsdóttir	Nordsjælland	7
6	(Denmark) Dajan Hashemi	Brøndby	7
6	(United States) Ashley Riefner	Fortuna Hjørring	7
9	(United States) Zoe Hasenauer	OB Q	6
9	(Denmark) Anna Walter	Nordsjælland	6

=== Hat-tricks ===
Player	Club	Against	Result	Date	Round	Ref.
(Denmark) Alma Aagaard	Nordsjælland	Kolding	4–0 (H)	10 August 2024	1	
(Denmark) Dajan Hashemi	Brøndby	AGF	2–3 (A)	21 September 2024	6	
(United States) Olivia Garcia	HB Køge	Kolding	5–0 (H)	20 October 2024	10	
(Nigeria) Joy Omewa	Fortuna Hjørring	Kolding	2–5 (A)	10 November 2024	12	
(Denmark) Anna Krog	OB Q	B.93	1–4 (A)	17 November 2024	13	
(Nigeria) Joy Omewa	Fortuna Hjørring	OB Q	1–6 (A)	7 June 2025	23	

== Awards ==
=== Player of the Year ===
Player	Club	Ref.
(Nigeria) Joy Omewa	Fortuna Hjørring	

== See also ==
- 2024–25 1st Division
- 2024–25 2nd Division
- 2024–25 Danish Cup
