= 2025–26 B-Liga =

B-Liga
- Season: 2025–26
- Dates: 16 August 2025 – 13 June 2026
- Promoted: ASA; Copenhagen
- Matches: 48
- Goals: 174 (3.63 per match)
- Best player: Benedicte Moss
- Top goalscorer: Benedicte Moss (11 goals)
- Best goalkeeper: Anna Kaas (7 clean sheets)
- Biggest home win: ASA 7–1 AaB (11 October 2025)
- Biggest away win: AaB 1–8 ASA (6 September 2025); Esbjerg 0–7 Copenhagen (5 October 2025)
- Highest scoring: AaB 1–8 ASA (6 September 2025)
- Longest winning run: 7 matches ASA; Copenhagen
- Longest unbeaten run: 11 matches Copenhagen
- Longest winless run: 8 matches Esbjerg
- Longest losing run: 8 matches Esbjerg
- Only matches in the regular season are covered in the statistics

The 2025–26 B-Liga was the 34th season of the second tier of the Danish Women's Football League, and the 4th season with the current format of eight teams.

For the 2025–26 season onwards, the 1st Division was renamed B-Liga.

== Format ==
The main round of the league is played in autumn as a double round-robin tournament between the 8 participating teams, where each team plays against each other both at home and away.

The four best placed teams qualify for spring A-Liga qualification play-offs. The qualification play-offs once again consists of a double round-robin tournament among the six participating teams. The scores from the main round carry over into the championship finals.

The four bottom ranked teams instead play in qualification play-offs, a double round-robin tournament with the top two teams (east and west) of the 2025–26 C-Liga for two spots in 2026–27 B-Liga. The scores from the main league are not carried over into the qualification tournament.

== Teams ==
There were 8 teams competing in the regular season of the league: the 4 teams from the previous season's qualification play-offs, and the 4 teams relegated from the previous season's A-Liga qualification play-offs. The four teams promoted to the B-Liga were Næstved HG, Esbjerg (taking over Varde IF's license) and AaB, staying in the B-Liga, while F.C. Copenhagen was promoted from the C-Liga. The four teams relegated from the A-Liga qualification play-offs were ASA Fodbold, Thy-Thisted and Østerbro, staying in the B-Liga, and B.93, relegated from the A-Liga. This was F.C. Copenhagen's first ever season in the 2nd tier since the club's founding in 2024, after only one season in C-Liga.

=== Changes ===
ENTERING B-LIGA		EXITING B-LIGA	
▲ from 2024–25 2nd Division	▼ from 2024–25 Women's League	▲ to 2025–26 A-Liga	▼ to 2025–26 C-Liga
Copenhagen	B.93	FC Midtjylland	Solrød FC (Note: Solrød FC departed the league as the team dissolved in spring 2025, leaving their spot in the 2024–25 1st Division unfilled.)

=== Stadiums and locations ===
Locations of the 2025–26 B-Liga teams.

Team	Location	Stadium	Capacity
ASA Fodbold	Århus	Robotize Park	1,000
B.93	Østerbro	Vanløse Idrætspark (Note: Some matches to be played at Svanemølleanlægget)	10,000
Copenhagen	Copenhagen	Vanløse Idrætspark	10,000
Esbjerg fB	Esbjerg	Blue Water Arena (Note: Some matches to be played at the Athletics Stadium, and at Vestjysk Bank Stadium)	16,942
Næstved HG	Næstved	MTM service Park	10,000
Thy-Thisted	Thisted	Sparkassen Thy Arena	3,000
Østerbro	Østerbro	Valby Idrætspark	12,000
AaB	Aalborg	AaB Anlæg (Note: Some matches to be played at Sparekassen Danmark Park)	1,000

=== Personnel and kits ===
Team	Manager	Captain	Kit	Sponsor
ASA	(Denmark) Anders Fedder Kristensen	(Denmark) Caroline Ahrendtsen	(Germany) Adidas	—N/a
B.93	(Denmark) Søren Fjorting	(Denmark) Freja Abildå	(Germany) Puma	(Denmark) Depanneur
Copenhagen	(Denmark) Kasper Klarskov	(Denmark) Julie Nowak	(Germany) Adidas	(Denmark) Andel Energi
Esbjerg	(Denmark) Carsten Hilding	(Denmark) Pernille Andreasen	(Denmark) Hummel	(United States) McDonald's
Næstved	(Denmark) Louise & Arne Ringsing	(Denmark) Katrine Krag-Andersen	(Germany) Puma	(Denmark) Spar Nord
Thy-Thisted	(Denmark) Stefan Vendelbo	(Denmark) Michelle Sandfeld	(Denmark) Select Sport	(Denmark) Sparekassen Thy
Østerbro	(Denmark) Michael Mejdahl	(Denmark) Trine Seistrup	(Germany) Adidas	—N/a
AaB	(Denmark) Martin Schjødt	(Denmark)	(Italy) Macron	(Denmark) Arbejdernes Landsbank

=== Managerial changes ===
Team	Outgoing manager	Manner of departure	Date of vacancy	Position	Incoming manager	Date of appointment
B.93	(Denmark) Christian Falk	Mutual consent	11 November 2025	7th	Nikolaj Jeppesen & Tonny Jørgensen (interim)	11 November 2025
Esbjerg fB	(Denmark) Søren Werner	Mutual consent	11 December 2025	8th	(Denmark) Carsten Hilding	11 December 2025
AaB	(Denmark) Jack Hansen	Resigned	31 December 2025	5th	(Denmark) Martin Schjødt	7 January 2026
B.93	Nikolaj Jeppesen & Tonny Jørgensen	End of interim spell	1 March 2026	7th	(Denmark) Søren Fjorting	1 March 2026

== Regular season ==
=== League table ===
Pos	Team	Pld	W	D	L	GF	GA	GD	Pts	Qualification
1	ASA	14	12	1	1	52	8	+44	37	A-Liga qualification play-offs
2	Copenhagen	14	11	2	1	41	10	+31	35	A-Liga qualification play-offs
3	Thy-Thisted	14	7	2	5	21	13	+8	23	A-Liga qualification play-offs
4	Østerbro	14	6	3	5	12	18	−6	21	A-Liga qualification play-offs
5	AaB	14	4	2	8	17	34	−17	14	B-liga play-offs
6	Næstved HG	14	4	1	9	18	28	−10	13	B-liga play-offs
7	B.93	14	4	1	9	21	40	−19	13	B-liga play-offs
8	Esbjerg	14	2	0	12	12	43	−31	6	B-liga play-offs

Source: Danish Football Association (in Danish), Soccerway
Rules for classification: 1) Points; 2) Goal difference; 3) Number of goals scored

=== Results ===
Home \ Away	ASA	B93	EFB	FCK	NÆS	THI	ØST	AAB
ASA		3–0	4–0	0–0	2–0	1–0	2–0	7–1
B.93	1–5		4–0	1–6	2–3	1–0	0–2	4–3
Esbjerg	1–7	2–4		0–7	1–0	1–3	1–2	1–2
Copenhagen	2–4	3–1	1–0		3–0	1–0	2–0	3–0
Næstved HG	1–6	4–0	1–2	2–6		1–2	1–1	0–2
Thy-Thisted	1–0	4–1	5–2	1–1	0–2		3–0	1–1
Østerbro	0–3	1–1	1–0	1–4	1–0	1–0		1–0
AaB	1–8	4–1	2–1	0–2	0–3	0–1	1–1	

Source: DBU.dk
Legend: Blue = home team win; Yellow = draw; Red = away team win.

== Play-offs ==
=== League table ===
Pos	Team	Pld	W	D	L	GF	GA	GD	Pts	Qualification
1	Sundby	10	8	1	1	26	14	+12	25	2026–27 B-Liga
2	B.93	10	5	3	2	14	8	+6	18	2026–27 B-Liga
3	Næstved HG	10	5	2	3	22	16	+6	17	2026–27 B-Liga
4	Viborg	10	4	1	5	17	16	+1	13	2026–27 B-Liga
5	AaB	10	2	2	6	13	27	−14	8	2026–27 B-Liga
6	Esbjerg	10	0	3	7	13	24	−11	3	2026–27 B-Liga

Source: Danish Football Association
Rules for classification: 1) Points; 2) Goal difference; 3) Goals scored; 4) Away goals scored; 5) Play-off (played on neutral ground if determining teams for different rounds); 6) Draw.

=== Results ===
Home \ Away	B93	EFB	NÆS	SUN	VIB	AAB
B.93		0–0	1–2	1–0	3–1	2–1
Esbjerg	0–2		0–1	4–5	2–3	2–2
Næstved HG	3–2	2–2		3–4	1–1	1–3
Sundby	0–0	5–1	2–1		3–1	3–1
Viborg	0–2	1–0	0–1	2–3		3–1
AaB	1–1	3–2	1–7	0–1	0–5	

Source: Danish Football Association
Legend: Blue = home team win; Yellow = draw; Red = away team win.

== Season statistics ==
=== Top scorers ===
Rank	Player	Club	Goals
1	(Denmark) Benedicte Moss	ASA	11
2	(Denmark) Maria Hovmark	Copenhagen	8
3	(Denmark) Josephine Lech	Copenhagen	7
4	(Denmark) Andrea Hauge	ASA	6
4	(Denmark) Malene Yde Hedegaard	ASA	6
6	(Denmark) Olivia Koefoed	Østerbro	5
6	(Denmark) Luna Lagerbon	B.93	5
6	(Denmark) Caroline Ahrendtsen	ASA	5
6	(Denmark) Thea Rhode	Copenhagen	5
6	(Denmark) Laura Grøn	AaB	5

=== Clean sheets ===
Rank	Player	Club	Clean sheets
1	(Denmark) Anna Kaas	Copenhagen	7
2	(Denmark) Sidse Tryk	ASA	5
3	(Denmark) Victoria Grinsted	Østerbro	3
3	(Denmark) Christina Kese	Næstved	3
3	(Denmark) Liva Petersson	Thy-Thisted	3
6	(Denmark) Katrine Beck	ASA	1
6	(Denmark) Trine Gaur	Østerbro	1
6	(Denmark) Alma Meier	B.93	1

== Awards ==
=== Player of the Autumn ===
Player	Club	Ref.
(Denmark) Benedicte Moss	ASA Fodbold	

== See also ==
- 2025–26 A-Liga
- 2025–26 C-Liga
- 2025–26 Danish Women's Cup
