= 2024–25 Danish Women's 2nd Division =

2nd Division
- Season: 2024–25
- Dates: 10 August 2024 – unknown
- Matches: 31
- Goals: 93 (3 per match)
- Biggest home win: Sundby BK 5–0 Allerød FK; 7 September 2024
- Biggest away win: Allerød FK 0–3 FC København; 24 August 2024; Fredensborg BI 0–3 B 73 Slagelse; 24 August 2024
- Highest scoring: JAI, Aarhus 4–2 Dalum/Næsby; 17 August 2024; OB Q II 5–1 JAI, Aarhus; 8 September 2024
- All statistics correct as of 17 September 2024.

The 2024–25 2nd Division is the 4th season of the second tier of the Danish Women's Football League.

== Format ==
The two groups play double round-robin matches home and away in the regular season. Two teams, one from each group, advance to qualify for promotion to the 1st Division (tier 2), while the remaining teams in the group move to the play-offs to stay in the 2nd Division. For the 2nd Division qualification play-offs the teams that placed 2nd to 6th in the regular season receive additional points from 1–5 corresponding to their results, ie. 2nd place receives 5 points, 3rd place receives 4 points etc. The 7th placed team is the sole team to receive no additional points going into the play-offs.

== Teams ==
=== Changes ===
ENTERING 2ND DIVISION		EXITING 2ND DIVISION	
▲ from 2023–24 DK Series	▼ from 2023–24 1st Division	▲ to 2024–25 1st Division	▼ to 2024–25 DK Series
Fredensborg BI; OB Q II; Ølstykke; Aalborg Freja	BSF; Sundby	Midtjylland; Solrød	FC King George; Køge BK; Thisted FC; Vejle B

=== Stadiums and locations ===
Locations of the 2024–25 2nd Division teams.

Team	Location	Stadium	Capacity
Allerød	Allerød	Allerød Sports Park	2,000
B73 Slagelse	Slagelse	Stadium West Slagelse	1,000
BSF	Ballerup	Ballerup Stadium	4,000
Brabrand IF	Brabrand	Brabrand Stadium	1,000
Copenhagen	Copenhagen	Vanløse Sports Park	2,000
Dalum/Næsby	Odense	Dalum Stadium	4,000
Fredensborg BI	Fredensborg	Fredensborg Stadium	2,000
JAI Fodbold	Aarhus	JAI Sports Facilities	
Kolding IF II	Kolding	—N/a	—N/a
OB Q II	Odense	Marienlyst Centre	
Sundby BK	Copenhagen	Kløvermarken Sports Facilities	
Ølstykke	Ølstykke	Ølstykke Stadium	3,000
Viborg FF	Viborg	Liseborgcentret	
Aalborg Freja	Aalborg	Gardian Park	

== Group 1 (East) ==
=== Regular season ===
Pos	Team	Pld	W	D	L	GF	GA	GD	Pts	Qualification	FCK	SUN	BSF	ØLS	B73	FRE	ALL
1	Copenhagen (Note: Competed as FC Damsø in the 2023–24 season.)	12	10	2	0	31	6	+25	32	1st Division qualification play-offs		2–1	3–0	3–0	3–0	3–0	3–0
2	Sundby	12	8	2	2	30	10	+20	26	2nd Division qualification play-offs	1–1		3–0	2–1	3–0	5–1	5–0
3	BSF	12	6	1	5	25	21	+4	19	2nd Division qualification play-offs	2–4	2–2		1–2	2–3	5–1	5–1
4	Ølstykke	12	5	1	6	18	16	+2	16	2nd Division qualification play-offs	0–1	1–2	0–1		3–1	0–2	5–1
5	B73 Slagelse	12	4	2	6	18	25	−7	14	2nd Division qualification play-offs	1–1	1–3	1–3	1–3		3–1	2–1
6	Fredensborg BI	12	3	1	8	13	29	−16	10	2nd Division qualification play-offs	1–4	1–0	0–2	1–1	0–3		3–0
7	Allerød	12	1	1	10	9	37	−28	4	2nd Division qualification play-offs	0–3	0–3	1–2	0–2	2–2	3–2	

Source: Danish Football Association (in Danish)
Legend: Blue = home team win; Yellow = draw; Red = away team win.
Rules for classification: 1) Points; 2) Goal difference; 3) Goals scored; 4) Head-to-head points; 5) Head-to-head goals; 6) Play-off (played on neutral ground if determining teams for different rounds); 7) Draw.

=== Play-offs ===
Pos	Team	Pld	W	D	L	GF	GA	GD	Pts	Qualification	SUN	BSF	FRE	B73	ØLS	ALL
1	Sundby	10	7	3	0	19	6	+13	29	2025–26 C-Liga		3–0	3–1	1–0	0–0	3–0
2	BSF	10	5	2	3	16	15	+1	21	2025–26 C-Liga	1–1		0–4	1–1	3–2	3–0
3	Fredensborg BI	10	6	1	3	23	15	+8	20	2025–26 C-Liga	2–2	2–1		1–2	3–1	4–2
4	B73 Slagelse	10	4	1	5	18	16	+2	15	2025–26 C-Liga	1–2	1–4	1–3		3–1	4–0
5	Ølstykke	10	2	3	5	13	19	−6	12	2025–26 Denmark Series	0–2	1–2	3–2	3–2		1–1
6	Allerød	10	0	2	8	5	23	−18	2	2025–26 Denmark Series	1–2	0–1	0–1	0–3	1–1	

Source: Danish Football Association (in Danish)
Legend: Blue = home team win; Yellow = draw; Red = away team win.
Rules for classification: 1) Points; 2) Goal difference; 3) Goals scored; 4) Head-to-head points; 5) Head-to-head goals; 6) Play-off (played on neutral ground if determining teams for different rounds); 7) Draw.

== Group 2 (West) ==
=== Regular season ===
Pos	Team	Pld	W	D	L	GF	GA	GD	Pts	Qualification	AAL	VIB	BRA	OD2	DAN	JAI	KO2
1	Aalborg Freja	10	4	4	2	16	11	+5	16	1st Division qualification play-offs		0–0	2–2	3–1	1–2	2–0	
2	Viborg FF	10	4	4	2	9	5	+4	16	2nd Division qualification play-offs	0–2		2–0	2–0	2–1	2–0	
3	Brabrand	10	4	3	3	16	15	+1	15	2nd Division qualification play-offs	2–1	1–1		0–1	4–3	2–0	
4	OB Q II (Note: Reserve teams are not allowed to advance beyond the third tier and are automatically relegated to the non-league Denmark Series (tier 4) if the main team gets relegated from the top tier.)	10	4	1	5	12	12	0	13	2nd Division qualification play-offs	2–2	1–0	0–2		0–1	5–1	
5	Dalum/Næsby (Note: Dalum/Næsby competed in group 1 (east) of the 2023–24 2nd Division, but got reassigned to group 2 (west) based on geographical proximity.)	10	4	1	5	15	17	−2	13	2nd Division qualification play-offs	2–3	0–0	3–1	0–2		1–0	
6	JAI	10	2	3	5	8	16	−8	9	2nd Division qualification play-offs	0–0	0–0	2–2	1–0	4–2		
7	Kolding IF II (Note: Kolding IF II was removed from the official standings and match fixtures prior to the beginning of the season. No official statement was issued as to the reason.)	0	0	0	0	0	0	0	0	Did not participate							

Source: Danish Football Association (in Danish)
Legend: Blue = home team win; Yellow = draw; Red = away team win.
Rules for classification: 1) Points; 2) Goal difference; 3) Goals scored; 4) Head-to-head points; 5) Head-to-head goals; 6) Play-off (played on neutral ground if determining teams for different rounds); 7) Draw.

=== Play-offs ===
Pos	Team	Pld	W	D	L	GF	GA	GD	Pts	Relegation	VFF	BRA	OD2	JAI	DAN
1	Viborg FF	8	7	1	0	13	5	+8	27	2025–26 C-Liga		1–0	1–0	2–2	2–0
2	Brabrand	8	4	0	4	14	13	+1	16	2025–26 C-Liga	1–2		1–4	1–2	3–2
3	OB Q II	8	4	0	4	18	10	+8	15	2025–26 C-Liga	1–2	0–2		3–0	4–0
4	JAI	8	2	2	4	10	17	−7	9	2025–26 C-Liga	0–1	1–3	0–3		1–1
5	Dalum/Næsby	8	1	1	6	12	22	−10	6	Relegation to 2025–26 Denmark Series	1–2	1–3	4–3	3–4	

Updated to match(es) played on unknown. Source: Danish Football Association (in Danish)
Legend: Blue = home team win; Yellow = draw; Red = away team win.
Rules for classification: 1) Points; 2) Goal difference; 3) Goals scored; 4) Head-to-head points; 5) Head-to-head goals; 6) Play-off (played on neutral ground if determining teams for different rounds); 7) Draw.

== Extra play off ==
Do to FC Solrød and Kolding IF defunct, there was an extra slot. After a one leg playoff, the winner was granted to stay in 2025–26 Danish Women's 2nd Division

7 July 2025	Dalum/Næsby	2-1	Ølstykke FC

== Season statistics ==
=== Top scorers ===
Rank	Player	Club	Goals
1	(Denmark) Julie Rutkjær	B73 Slagelse	13
2	(Denmark) Sissel Bøje	Sundby	11
2	(Denmark) Rosa Horskjær	Sundby	11
4	(Denmark) Jessica Pongkul	Ølstykke	10
5	(Denmark) Emma Brandt	Copenhagen	9
6	(Denmark) Johanne Hauge Smith	BSF	8
7	(Denmark) Barbara Godvin	BSF	7
7	(Denmark) Kamilla Ørskov	Dalum/Næsby	7
9	(Denmark) Maiken Danielsen	Viborg FF	6
9	(Denmark) Emilie Langhorn	Sundby	6
9	(Denmark) Natalie Randrup	Fredensborg	6
9	(Denmark) Emilie Stolzenbach	BSF	6

== See also ==
- 2024–25 Danish Women's League
- 2024–25 Danish Women's 1st Division
- 2024–25 Danish Cup
