= 2024–25 Danish Women's 1st Division =

Danish 1st Division
- Season: 2024–25
- Dates: 10 August 2024 – 14 June 2025
- Promoted: Midtjylland
- Matches: 56
- Goals: 183 (3.27 per match)
- Top goalscorer: Rikke Dybdahl (16 goals)
- Biggest home win: Midtjylland 11–0 Solrød; 28 September 2024
- Biggest away win: Solrød 0–7 Midtjylland; 21 September 2024
- Highest scoring: Midtjylland 11–0 Solrød; 28 September 2024
- Longest winning run: 10 matches Midtjylland
- Longest unbeaten run: 12 matches Midtjylland
- Longest winless run: 14 matches Solrød
- Longest losing run: 12 matches Solrød
- Only matches in the regular season are covered in the statistics

The 2024-25 1st Division was the 33rd season of the second tier of the Danish Women's Football League, and the 4th season with the current format of eight teams.

== Format ==
The main round of the league is played in autumn as a double round-robin tournament between the 8 participating teams, where each team plays against each other both at home and away.

The four best placed teams qualify for spring A-Liga qualification play-offs. The qualification play-offs once again consists of a double round-robin tournament among the six participating teams. The scores from the main round carry over into the championship finals.

The four bottom ranked teams instead play in qualification play-offs, a double round-robin tournament with the top two teams (east and west) of the 2025–26 C-Liga for two spots in 2026–27 B-Liga. The scores from the main league are not carried over into the qualification tournament.

== Teams ==
=== Changes ===
ENTERING 1ST DIVISION		EXITING 1ST DIVISION	
▲ from 2023–24 2nd Division	▼ to 2024–25 2nd Division	▲ from 2023–24 2nd Division	▼ to 2024–25 2nd Division
Midtjylland; Solrød	AaB; FC Thy-Thisted Q	B.93; OB Q	BSF; Sundby BK

=== Stadiums and locations ===
Locations of the 2024–25 1st Division teams.

Team	Location	Stadium	Capacity
ASA	Århus	Robotize Park	1,000
Midtjylland	Herning	Vildbjerg Sports & Culture Center	2,000
Næstved HG	Næstved	MTM service Park (Note: Some matches to be played at Næstved IF Football Sports Facilities.)	10,000
Solrød	Solrød	Solrød Sports Center	1,000
Thy-Thisted	Thisted	Sparkassen Thy Arena	3,000
Varde	Varde	Vestjysk Bank Stadium	4,000
Østerbro	Østerbro	Valby Idrætspark	12,000
AaB	Aalborg	AaB Facilities (Note: Some matches to be played at Sparekassen Danmark Park)	1,000

=== Personnel and kits ===
Team	Manager	Captain	Kit	Sponsor
ASA	(Denmark) Anders Fedder	(Denmark) Caroline Jensen	(Germany) Adidas	—N/a
Midtjylland	(Denmark) Steen Ladefoged	(Denmark) Katrine Thisgaard		
Næstved	(Denmark) Louise & Arne Ringsing	(Denmark) Katrine Krag-Andersen	(Germany) Puma	
Solrød	(Denmark) Carsten Grønning	(Denmark)		
Thy-Thisted	(Denmark) Stefan Vendelbo	(Denmark) Michelle Sandfeld	(Denmark) Select	
Varde	(Denmark) Søren Werner	(Denmark)		
Østerbro	(Denmark) Michael Mejdahl	(Denmark) Trine Seistrup	(Germany) Adidas	
AaB	(Denmark) Jack Hansen	(Denmark) Cille Holst	(Italy) Macron	

=== Managerial changes ===
Team	Outgoing manager	Manner of departure	Date of vacancy	Position in the table	Incoming manager	Date of appointment
ASA	(Denmark) Søren Kiilerich	Signed by Ottawa Rapid FC	1 January 2025		(Denmark) Anders Fedder	–

== Regular season ==
=== League table ===
Pos	Team	Pld	W	D	L	GF	GA	GD	Pts	Qualification or relegation
1	Midtjylland	14	12	1	1	52	7	+45	37	Danish League qualification play-offs
2	FC Thy-Thisted Q	14	10	1	3	25	4	+21	31	Danish League qualification play-offs
3	ASA	14	8	2	4	28	22	+6	26	Danish League qualification play-offs
4	Østerbro	14	4	5	5	18	20	−2	17	Danish League qualification play-offs
5	Næstved HG	14	4	5	5	14	19	−5	17	1st Division qualification play-offs
6	Varde	14	5	1	8	20	29	−9	16	1st Division qualification play-offs
7	AaB	14	3	4	7	14	21	−7	13	1st Division qualification play-offs
8	Solrød (Note: Solrød dissolved and withdrew from the league before the spring play-offs.)	14	0	1	13	12	61	−49	1	1st Division qualification play-offs

Source: Danish Football Association (in Danish)
Rules for classification: 1) Points; 2) Goal difference; 3) Goals scored; 4) Away goals scored; 5) Play-off (played on neutral ground if determining teams for different rounds); 6) Draw.

=== Results ===
Home \ Away	ASA	MID	NÆS	SOL	THI	VAR	ØST	AAB
ASA		0–3	1–1	6–2	0–1	2–0	2–0	1–0
Midtjylland	4–1		2–0	11–0	1–0	3–0	5–0	5–0
Næstved HG	1–3	2–6		2–1	0–2	0–0	3–0	1–1
Solrød	0–4	0–7	1–2		0–5	1–3	1–1	2–5
FC Thy-Thisted Q	5–0	0–1	1–0	3–0		3–0	1–1	1–0
Varde	2–3	2–1	1–2	7–3	0–2		1–2	2–1
Østerbro	1–3	2–2	0–0	3–0	0–1	5–0		2–0
AaB	2–2	0–1	0–0	2–1	1–0	1–2	1–1	

Source: Danish Football Association (in Danish)
Legend: Blue = home team win; Yellow = draw; Red = away team win.

== Qualification play-offs ==
=== League table ===
Pos	Team	Pld	W	D	L	GF	GA	GD	Pts	Qualification
1	Copenhagen (P)	8	6	2	0	22	5	+17	20	2025–26 B-Liga
2	Næstved HG	8	4	2	2	16	8	+8	14	2025–26 B-Liga
3	AaB	8	2	4	2	12	10	+2	10	2025–26 B-Liga
4	Varde	8	2	2	4	8	14	−6	8	2025–26 B-Liga
5	Aalborg Freja	8	0	2	6	4	25	−21	2	2025–26 C-Liga

Source: Danish Football Association
Rules for classification: 1) Points; 2) Goal difference; 3) Goals scored; 4) Away goals scored; 5) Play-off (played on neutral ground if determining teams for different rounds); 6) Draw.
(P) Promoted

=== Results ===
Home \ Away	FCK	NÆS	VAR	AAB	AAF
Copenhagen		2–1	2–0	3–2	3–0
Næstved HG	2–2		1–0	1–0	5–1
Varde	0–3	2–1		1–1	3–1
AaB	0–0	1–1	5–2		1–1
Aalborg Freja	0–7	0–4	0–0	1–2	

Source: Danish Football Association (in Danish)
Legend: Blue = home team win; Yellow = draw; Red = away team win.

== Season statistics ==
Only matches in the regular season are covered in the statistics

=== Top scorers ===
Rank	Player	Club	Goals
1	(Denmark) Rikke Dybdahl	Midtjylland	16
2	(Denmark) Amalie Lund	Varde	11
3	(Denmark) Therese Vestermark	Midtjylland	10
4	(Denmark) Sissel Bøje	Solrød	8
5	(Denmark) Julie Offersen	Østerbro	7
6	(Denmark) Ulrikke Linde	ASA	6
6	(Denmark) Benedicte Moss	ASA	6
8	(Denmark) Anna Givskov	Thy-Thisted	5
8	(Switzerland) Sarina Heeb	Thy-Thisted	5
8	(Denmark) Mathilde Kaihøj	Midtjylland	5

=== Hat-tricks ===
Player	For	Against	Result	Date
(Denmark) Rikke Dybdahl	Midtjylland	Østerbro	5–0 (H)	14 September 2024
(Denmark) Therese Vestermark^{4}	Midtjylland	Solrød	11–0 (H)	28 September 2024
(Denmark) Amalie Lund	Varde	Solrød	7–3 (H)	16 November 2024

^{4} – player scored 4 goals

=== Clean sheets ===
Rank	Player	Club	Clean sheets
1	(Denmark) Liva Petersson	Thy-Thisted	10
1	(Denmark) Katrine Thisgaard	Midtjylland	10
3	(Denmark) Katrine Beck	ASA	4
3	(Denmark) Mira Pastoft	Næstved HG	4
3	(Denmark) Josephine Thayssen	Østerbro	4
6	(Denmark) Camilla Bech Bonde	AaB	1
6	(Denmark) Sofie Zoëga Hansen	Varde	1
6	(Denmark) Astrid Kitchen	AaB	1
