= Kenneth Cortsen =

Danish researcher (born 1976)

Personal information
- Date of birth: 25 April 1976 (age 50)

Senior career*
Years	Team	Apps	(Gls)
- Nørresundby Boldklub
- Viborg FF

Managerial career
- Løgstør IF
- 2013–2017: AaB Fodbold (reserves)
- 2018–2020: AaB W
- * Club domestic league appearances and goals

Kenneth Cortsen (born 25 April 1976) is a Danish sport management researcher and football coach, who is also a former player.

== Academic career ==
Cortsen works at Aarhus University with research into the commercialisation of sports.

== Managerial career ==
Cortsen worked with Løgstør IF for years achieving promotion to the Denmark Series, and went on to coach in that same division the AaB Fodbold men's reserve team. He was signed as the head coach for then-Denmark Series Women side AaB in 2018 and led the team to promotion to the top tier after two seasons, in 2020.
