= Jakob Glerup =

Danish footballer and manager (born 1975)

Personal information
- Full name: Jakob Glerup Nielsen
- Date of birth: 20 April 1975 (age 51)
- Place of birth: Borup, Denmark
- Height: 1.78 m (5 ft 10 in)
- Position: Midfielder

Team information
- Current team: Viborg FF (head coach)

Youth career
- –1994: Aalborg Chang

Senior career*
Years	Team	Apps	(Gls)
1994–2010	Viborg	471	(8)

International career
1995	Denmark U19	1	(0)
1996–1997	Denmark U21	13	(0)

Managerial career
- 2022–: Team Viborg/Viborg W
- * Club domestic league appearances and goals

Jakob Glerup Nielsen (born 20 April 1975) is a Danish football manager and former midfielder. He is currently serving as head coach of B-Liga club Viborg FF.

== Club career ==
Glerup joined Viborg in 1994 from Aalborg Chang, and within months, moved to Viborg's first-team squad. He spent the remainder of his playing career with Viborg from 1994 until his retirement in 2010.

== Managerial career ==
In July 2022, Glerup became the head coach of Team Viborg. In January 2026, the club announced that Glerup had extended his contract as head coach of the club, now playing under the name of Viborg FF.

== Honours ==
Viborg

- Danish 1st Division: 1997–98
- Danish Cup: 1999–2000
- Danish Super Cup: 2000
