= Esbjerg fB (women) =

- Full name: Esbjerg forenede Boldklubber
- Short name: EfB
- Founded: 1975; 51 years ago (Note: As Varde IF.)
- Ground: TESS Arena Esbjerg
- Coach: Michael Schjønberg
- League: B-Liga
- 2025–26: B-Liga, 6th of 6
- Website: EfB Team
Home colours	Away colours

Esbjerg forenede Boldklubber (commonly known as Esbjerg fB) is a Danish football club based in Esbjerg, Denmark. The club compete in B-Liga, the second division of the Danish Women's Football League. The club is a collaboration between Esbjerg fB and Varde IF, with Esbjerg inheriting Varde's license following the 2024–25 season.

== History ==
Varde IF was founded in 1975. The team started in the non-league Series 2 (tier 7) and were eventually promoted into the top-flight, their biggest result being bronze medals in the 1989 season. Varde reached the Danish Cup final for the first time in 2017, earning silver in a 3–1 loss to Brøndby. Former AGF coach Michael Schjønberg was hired as the new head coach in November 2026 following a B-Liga autumn season with no wins.

== Players ==
As of 27 September 2026

Note: Flags indicate national team as defined under FIFA eligibility rules; some limited exceptions apply. Players may hold more than one non-FIFA nationality.

No.	Pos.	Nation	Player
1	GK	DEN	Karla Bæk Eskildsen
2	DF	DEN	Josefine Bækgaard
3	DF	DEN	Freya Winther (captain)
4	MF	DEN	Freja Ankjær
5	DF	DEN	Jane Jeppesen
6	MF	DEN	Andrea Jørgensen
7	DF	DEN	Julie Dinesen
9	MF	DEN	Vilja Dahl
10	MF	USA	Jordan Johnson
11	MF	DEN	Eline Lund
12	DF	DEN	Emma Vermehren
13	DF	DEN	Emilie Billing
14	MF	DEN	Emma Foldager

No.	Pos.	Nation	Player
15	MF	DEN	Frederikke Jensen
16	FW	DEN	Sophia Husted
17	FW	DEN	Line Snitgaard
18	GK	GER	Svenja Hoppe
21	MF	DEN	Freja Poulsen
23	FW	DEN	Karoline Kamp
24	MF	DEN	Laura Morgenstjærne
25	MF	DEN	Cecilia Smidt Pors
26	GK	EST	Heliisa Aasa
27	MF	DEN	Freya Bach
28	MF	DEN	Maria Høj
31		DEN	Louise Nielsen

== Management ==
=== Coaching ===
As of September 2026

Years	Name
Head Coach	(Denmark) Michael Schjønberg
Assistant Coach	(Denmark) Morten Svane
Goalkeeping Coach	(Denmark) Louise Nielsen (Denmark) Martin Damgaard
Team Manager	(Denmark) Aase Damgaard
Physiotherapist	(Denmark) Sofie Djuv-Opedal

=== Club ===
Years	Name
Sporting Director	(Denmark) Nicolaj Køhlert

=== Managers ===
Years	Name
2026–	(Denmark) Michael Schjønberg
2025–2026	(Denmark) Carsten Hilding
As Varde IF
2023–	(Denmark) Kim Jensen
2018–	(Denmark) Allan Drost
2017–2018	(Denmark) Jesper Callesen
	(Denmark) Kaj Nielsen

== See also ==
- Esbjerg fB (men's team)
