= AaB Women =

Danish football club

AaB
- Full name: Aalborg Boldspilklub
- Founded: 2011; 15 years ago
- Ground: AaB Anlæg, Aalborg
- Capacity: 1,000
- Owner: AaB af 1885
- Coach: Christian Winther Borup
- League: B-Liga
- 2025–26: B-Liga, 5th of 6
- Website: AaB Women
Home colours	Away colours

AaB Women (commonly known as AaB) is a Danish women's football team based in Aalborg, North Jutland. They compete in the B-Liga, the second tier of the Danish Women's Football League.

In 2023, AaB Kvinde Elite A/S was bought by AaB af 1885, uniting the women's and men's teams under its parent club. The team achieved promotion to the Danish top-flight in June 2020, for the first time in the club's history. They were however relegated again in the 2021-22 season

== Stadium ==
AaB play their home matches at AaBs Anlæg, the training facilities for the men's team. Occasionally the team play matches at the men's stadium, Aalborg Stadium, which has a capacity of about 13,000 spectators.

== Players ==
As of 19 September 2026

Note: Flags indicate national team as defined under FIFA eligibility rules; some limited exceptions apply. Players may hold more than one non-FIFA nationality.

No.	Pos.	Nation	Player
1	GK	DEN	Emmeline Andersen
2	DF	DEN	Emma Lind (vice-captain)
3	DF	DEN	Line Mumgård
4	DF	DEN	Karla Rasmussen
5	DF	DEN	Natasja Haldrup
6	MF	DEN	Matilde Tesgaard
7	FW	FRO	Petra Hoydal
8	MF	DEN	Patricia Christensen
9	FW	PUR	Karina Socarrás
10	MF	DEN	Anne-Laura Jakobsen (captain)
11	FW	DEN	Cecilie Thomsen
12	MF	DEN	Frederikke Silberbauer
13	FW	DEN	Signe Hagsten
14	MF	DEN	Julie Skadhauge
15	FW	DEN	Chantal Katompwa
16	MF	DEN	Carla Simoni
17	MF	DEN	Carla Sveistrup
18	MF	DEN	Line Nørgaard
19	FW	DEN	Laura Grøn

No.	Pos.	Nation	Player
20	MF	DEN	Johanne Christiansen
21	FW	DEN	Ida Vede
22		DEN	Mille Mortensen
23	DF	DEN	Emma Højsby
27	MF	ENG	Natasha Kay Povey
28	DF	DEN	Anne-Sofie Frederiksen
30	GK	DEN	Sarah Hedehus
31	GK	DEN	Astrid Kitchen
41	DF	DEN	Elina Lundtoft
50	GK	DEN	Freja Welløv
—	DF	DEN	Frederikke Johnsen
—	DF	DEN	Nanna Nørlem
—	MF	DEN	Julie Winther
—	GK	DEN	Marie-Louise Marckstrøm
—	DF	DEN	Cecilie Kruse
—	FW	ESP	Naiara Rodríguez Barcojo
—	FW	DEN	Selma Rasmussen
—		DEN	Frida Thomsen

=== Captains ===
Incomplete

Years	Player
2026–	(Denmark) Anne-Laura Jakobsen
2025–	(Denmark) Astrid Kitchen
2023–2025	(Denmark) Cille Holst
–2023	(Denmark) Emma Nøddelund
	(Denmark) Line Andersen

=== Player records ===
==== Caps ====
Incomplete

#	Player	Caps
	(Denmark) Lone Bang	200+
	(Denmark) Cille Holst	118
	(Denmark) Solveig Pekruhn	100+
	(Denmark) May-Britt Andersen	100+
	(Denmark) Jytte Jacobsen	100+

== Management ==
As of 2 August 2026

=== First team ===
Role	Name
Head Coach	(Denmark) Christian Winther Borup
Assistant Coach	(Denmark) Jesper Dalum
Goalkeeper Coach	(Denmark) Uffe Nicolajsen
Fitness Coach	(Faroe Islands) Odinn Johansen
Mental Coach	(Denmark) Henrik Selch
Team Manager	(Denmark) Heidi Jonassen
Analytics	(Denmark) Jack Hansen
Medical
Physiotherapist	(Faroe Islands) Bjartur Thomsen (Denmark) Petrea Frellsen

=== Club ===
Role	Name
Head of Football and Coaching	(Spain) Jessica Rodriguez

=== Managers ===
Incomplete

Years	Name
2026–	(Denmark) Christian Winther Borup
2026	(Denmark) Martin Schjødt
2024–2025	(Denmark) Jack Hansen
2023–2024	(Faroe Islands) Claus Bech Jørgensen
2022–2023	(Denmark) Peter Pedersen
–2022	(Denmark) Claus Larsen
2018–2020	(Denmark) Kenneth Cortsen
2016–2017	(Denmark) Hans-Martin Lauesen
	(Denmark) Keld Sørensen
	(Denmark) Ove Christensen
1978–	(Denmark) Frits Villadsen
1975–1977	(Denmark) Esben Elbæk
–1974	(Finland) Kaarlo Niilonen

== Seasons ==
As of the 2025–26 season

Key
Champions	Promotion
Silver	Relegation
Bronze	

Incomplete

Season	Tier	#	W	D	L	F	A	Pts.	Cup
DIVISION WEST (2nd of 2) (Note: The league was originally divided into two groups of 10 teams, representing the east and the west of the country.)
1975	1	6th of 10				34	39	19	
1976	1	10th of 10				10	63	4	
1977	5 (Note: A second tier, 1st Division (now B-Liga), a third tier, 2nd Division (now C-Liga), and the now fourth tier, the Denmark Series (non-league), were created in 1981, 1993, and 2021, respectively; up until 1981, the local series - eg. Jutland Series, Zealand Series (now tier 5) - were the second tier.)								
1978	1								
1979	1								
1980									
SINGLE-DIVISION LEAGUE (Note: From the 1981 season onwards, the league was changed to a single division encompassing the 12 best teams from across the country.)
1981	4	2nd of 10				55	41	22	
1982	4								
1983									
1984									
1985									
1986	6								
1987									
1988									
1989	5								
1990	5								
1991									
1992									
1993	5								
1994									
1995									
1996									
1996–97									
1997–98									
1998–99									
1999–00									
2000–01									
2001–02									
2002–03									
2003–04									
2004–05	5								
2005–06	4	3rd of 6	5	4	1	19	8	19	
2006–07	4	4th of 6	5	0	5	21	22	15	
2007–08	4	1st of 8	18	0	3	76	22	54	
2008–09	2	3rd of 10	9	4	5	44	24	31	
2009–10	2	2nd of 10	13	2	3	43	21	41	
2010–11	1	10th of 10	1	0	17	13	81	3	
2011–12	2	8th of 10	2	3	13	13	52	9	
2012–13	4	5th of 8	8	5	8	31	31	29	
2013–14	4	3rd of 8	7	3	4	24	19	24	
2014–15	4	4th of 8	6	3	5	27	14	21	
2015–16	4	1st of 8	13	0	1	50	11	39	
2016–17	2	5th of 6	6	2	6	21	19	20	
2017–18	4	1st of 8	13	1	0	65	12	40	
2018–19	2	5th of 6	2	1	7	18	27	7	
2019–20	2	2nd of 6	4	0	1	12	6	12	
2020–21	1	8th of 8	6	2	2	11	7	20	
2021–22	1	10th of 12	3	1	6	14	19	10	
2022–23	2	2nd of 6	6	2	2	28	12	20	
2023–24	1	9th of 12	5	2	3	16	7	17	
2024–25	2	3rd of 6 (Note: Technically of 5, as Solrød FC withdrew from the league before the qualification play-offs.)	2	4	2	12	10	10	
2025–26	2	5th of 6	4	2	8	17	34	14	
2026–27	2	Season in progress							

Sources

- Danish Football Association (in Danish)
- "arkiv.dk | Aalborg Boldspilklub (AaB). Damer. Divisionshold. År 1978". arkiv.azurewebsites.net.
- "arkiv.dk | Aalborg Boldspilklub (AaB). Damer. Divisionshold. År 1979". arkiv.azurewebsites.net.
- "Fortuna Hjørring Scrapbog 1981". Issuu (in Danish). p. 7.

== See also ==
- AaB Fodbold, men's team
