= FC Thy-Thisted Q =

Danish football club

- Full name: Football Club Thy-Thisted Q
- Short name: FC Thy
- Founded: 2017; 9 years ago
- Ground: Sparekassen Thy Arena, Thisted
- Capacity: 4,000
- Chairman: Johnny Kristensen
- Coach: Stefan Vendelbo
- League: B-Liga
- 2025-26: B-Liga, 5th of 6
- Website: Thy-Thisted Q
Home colours

Football Club Thy-Thisted Q is a Danish women's football club based in Thisted, Denmark. The club competes in the B-Liga, the second tier of the Danish Women's Football League, and play their home matches at Sparekassen Thy Arena. The team was previously part of Thisted FC.

FC Thy-Thisted Q was created in 2017 as a superstructure between the following five clubs: Koldby Hørdum IF, Nors B, IF Nordthy, Frøstrup Hannæs IF and Thisted FC. In 2018 the club achieved promotion to the top tier, A-Liga, and entered the Championship play-offs in their first season. Thy-Thisted Q won their first title when they beat the multiple league and cup title holders, Brøndby, to take home the 2021 Danish Cup. The club also won silver in the 2020 and 2022 cup finals against Nordsjælland and Fortuna Hjørring, respectively.

== History ==
In July 2026 the club announced announced a sudden cut in the budget for the women's team, while the men's team remain unaffected, citing financial issues in running the club. The cuts include no longer offering contracts to players that ensure benefits and minimum wage. There were reports that the players had unknowingly played without being told the contracts were not registered with the Danish Football Association, which the club refuted. Club stalwart Saustrup Kristensen announced the retirement of her active playing career in August 2026, after speaking out against the budget cuts, citing her retirement as a direct result of the club's actions. Team captain Michelle Sandfeld announced in August 2026 her decision to put her playing career on hold after seven years with the club, citing the club's actions as well. Head Coach Stefan Vendelbo resigned in October 2026 after 6,5 years with Thy-Thisted Q.

== Players ==
As of 7 November 2026

Note: Flags indicate national team as defined under FIFA eligibility rules; some limited exceptions apply. Players may hold more than one non-FIFA nationality.

No.	Pos.	Nation	Player
1	GK	DEN	Camilla Bonde
5	MF	DEN	Mathilde Gaarn
6	DF	DEN	Frederikke Bruun
7	MF	DEN	Silje Storm
8	MF	DEN	Johanne Toft
9	DF	DEN	Lotte Bak
10	MF	DEN	Mie Kristensen
13	DF	DEN	Karen Nonboe
14	FW	DEN	Naja Jensen
16	GK	DEN	Christine Thøgersen
18	DF	DEN	Sara Fruelund
19	FW	DEN	Molli Plasmann
21	FW	DEN	Camilla Dybdahl

No.	Pos.	Nation	Player
22	DF	DEN	Karoline Sand
23	DF	DEN	Signe Hove
24	MF	DEN	Janni Nystrup (captain)
25	MF	DEN	Nanna Ottow
26	MF	DEN	Anna Bay Sørensen
27	DF	DEN	Josefine Sørensen
30	FW	DEN	Laura Groth
31	MF	DEN	Jasmin Jensen
32	GK	DEN	Catrine Vendelbo
33	MF	DEN	Amalie Markusen
—	FW	DEN	Simone Skadhauge
—	GK	DEN	Natascha Sørig

=== Player records ===
==== Caps ====
Incomplete

#	Player	Caps
1	(Denmark) Line Saustrup Kristensen	234

=== Captains ===
Incomplete

Years	Name
2026–	(Denmark) Janni Nystrup
2024–2026	(Denmark) Michelle Sandfeld
–2024	(Denmark) Camilla Nielsen
2018–2022	(Denmark) Matilde Kjeldgaard

=== Notable former players ===
For more former players, see Category:FC Thy-Thisted Q players.

== Management ==
=== Coaching ===
Role	Name
Head Coach	Vacant
Assistant Coach & Analytics	(Denmark) Michael Lauridsen
Goalkeeper Coach	(Denmark) Johny Eriksen
Fitness Coach	(Denmark) Anne Sophie Siersbæk
Team Manager	(Denmark) Molli Plasmann
Team Doctor	(Denmark) Søren Kæseler

=== Club ===
Role	Name
Chairman	(Denmark) Johnny Kristensen
Sporting Director	(Denmark) Regin Iversen

=== Managers ===
Incomplete

Years	Name
2026–	(Denmark)
2024–2026	(Denmark) Stefan Vendelbo
2022–2024	(Denmark) Peer Lisdorf
2021	(Denmark) Allan Drost
2017–2020	(Denmark) Torben Overgaard

== Honours ==
Contest	#	Years
Danish Cup	1	(gold) 2020–21
Danish Cup	2	(silver) 2019–20, 2021–22

== Seasons ==
As of the 2025–26 season

The overview shows the final position achieved, while the match stats are from the regular season.

Key
(gold) Champions	Promotion
(silver) Silver	Relegation
(bronze) Bronze	

Incomplete

Season	Tier	#	W	D	L	F	A	Pts.	Cup
As Thisted FC
2016–17	2	1st of 6	4	3	7	29	42	15	QF
Thy-Thisted Q
2017–18	2								
2018–19	1								
2019–20	1								2nd
2020–21	1								1st
2021–22	1								2nd
2022–23	1								
2023–24	1	4th of 6	3	4	7	14	20	13	
2024–25	2	6th of 6	10	1	3	25	4	31	2nd round
2025–26	2	3rd of 6	7	2	5	21	13	23	2nd round
2026–27	2								

Sources: Thy-Thisted – Danish Football Association, Tipsbladet
