= ASA Fodbold (women) =

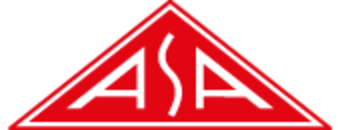
- Full name: Arbejder Sport Aarhus Fodbold
- Nickname: Klubben i centrum (The club in the town centre)
- Short name: ASA
- Founded: 1970s
- Ground: ASA Grounds
- Capacity: 1,000
- Chairman: Jesper Emborg
- Coach: Henrik Larsen
- League: A-Liga
- 2025–26: B-Liga, 3rd of 8 (promoted)
- Website: ASA Fodbold
Home colours	Away colours

Arbejder Sport Aarhus Fodbold (commonly known as ASA Fodbold) is a Danish women's football team based in Aarhus, Denmark, which is part of the multi-sports club ASA. They currently compete in A-Liga, the top-flight of the Danish Women's Football League.

== History ==
ASA finished top of the 2025–26 B-Liga, with their top scorer Benedicte Moss winning Player of the Autumn, and went on to compete for a chance at promotion into the A-Liga. In May 2026, ahead of the conclusion of the promotion play-offs, it was announced that head coach Anders Fedder Kristensen would join city rivals AGF on 1 July 2026. On 30 May 2026 ASA secured promotion to the top-flight with a 5–1 victory against Østerbro IF.

Henrik Larsen became the new ASA head coach in July 2026, having previously coached in the league clubs Fortuna Hjørring, Viborg, and AaB. ASA applied for dispensation to remain in the top tier with few weeks until the season commenced due to failure to comply with the required pitch regulations, as failure to comply would result in enforced automatic relegation despite having qualified for A-Liga. ASA was granted dispensation by Ligaforbundet to play their home matches at XL Park Vorup about a week before the season commenced.

In the first Aarhus derby in the league since Skovbakken v ASA in 2002, ASA beat AGF 3–1 at home. In the return match, ASA won 3–1 again, doing the double over AGF in ASA's first season in the top flight in 10 years.

In their first season in the top division, the team reached the Championship play-off.

== Squad ==
As of 22 August 2026

Note: Flags indicate national team as defined under FIFA eligibility rules; some limited exceptions apply. Players may hold more than one non-FIFA nationality.

No.	Pos.	Nation	Player
1	GK	DEN	Sidse Tryk (3rd captain)
2	DF	DEN	Alberte Emborg
3	DF	DEN	Lærke Stær
4	DF	DEN	Andrea Hauge
5	FW	DEN	Tanja Hymøller
6	MF	DEN	Sarah Jusjong
7	FW	DEN	Caroline Ahrendtsen (captain)
8	MF	DEN	Helena Fuglsang
9	FW	DEN	Benedicte Moss
10	MF	DEN	Anne Larsen
11	FW	DEN	Malene Yde
12	MF	DEN	Filippa Sylvester
13	MF	DEN	Frida Binderup
14	FW	DEN	Laura Feddersen

No.	Pos.	Nation	Player
15	DF	NOR	Tina Fremo
16	FW	DEN	Ulrikke Linde (vice-captain)
17	FW	DEN	Ida Eriksen
18	MF	DEN	Maria Denius
19	DF	DEN	Karoline Wutborg
20	DF	DEN	Pernille Madsen
21	DF	DEN	Malene Nielsen
22	MF	DEN	Kathrine Spanner
23	FW	DEN	Nicoline Schrøder
25	GK	DEN	Frieda Jensen
28	MF	DEN	Ida Thomsen
—	MF	DEN	Louise Rosager
—	FW	NOR	Una Søyland

== Management ==
=== Coaching staff ===
As of 25 July 2026

Position	Staff
Head Coach	Henrik Larsen
Assistant Coach	Emil Razic Sejrsen
First Team Coach	Louise Rosager
Goalkeeper Coach	Paw Jensen
Fitness Coach	Stine Sloth Jensen; Mik Ernebjerg Josefsen
Team Manager	Nicklas Lind Jørgensen

=== Managers ===
Incomplete

Position	Staff
2026–	(Denmark) Henrik Larsen
2025–2026	(Denmark) Anders Fedder
2024	(Denmark) Søren Kiilerich
2020–2024	(Denmark) Jack Hansen

== Seasons ==
As of the 2025–26 season

Key
(gold) Champions	Promotion
(silver) Silver	Relegation
(bronze) Bronze	

Incomplete

Season	Tier	#	W	D	L	F	A	Pts.	Cup
2000–01	4	11th of 12	3	0	19	22	103	9	
2001–02	5								
2010–11	4	3rd of 8	11	4	6	46	25	37	
2011–12	2	5th of 10	8	4	6	35	27	28	
2012–13	2	4th of 10	9	4	5	37	16	31	
2013–14	2	4th of 8	7	2	5	18	17	23	
2014–15	2	1st of 16	9	2	1	28	11	29	
2015–16	1	11th of 12	0	1	13	6	58	1	
2016–17	2	7th of 16	6	3	5	25	20	21	
2017–18	2	8th of 16	7	1	6	24	28	22	
2018–19	2	6th of 16	6	4	4	21	24	22	
2019–20	2	11th of 16	5	4	5	25	28	19	
2020–21	2	7th of 20 (Note: The league was divided into four groups of five (usually there were two groups of eight) and the season shortened to incorporate a new one-off play-off season to assist in the creation of the new third tier, C-Liga. ASA qualified to remain in the second tier under this one-off format.)	4	1	3	18	12	13	
2021–22	2	5th of 8	5	3	6	14	19	18	
2022–23	3	1st of 8	9	1	2	28	14	28	
2023–24	2	5th of 8	5	3	6	30	27	18	
2024–25	2	3rd of 8	8	2	4	28	22	26	R16
2025–26	2	3rd of 6	12	1	1	52	8	37	QF
2026–27	1	Season in progress							

Sources: Danish Football Association, Tipsbladet

== See also ==
- ASA Fodbold, men's team
