= B-Liga =

- Organising body: Danish FA (DBU)
- Founded: 1992; 34 years ago
- First season: 1993
- Country: Denmark
- Confederation: UEFA
- Divisions: 1 (2021–present)
- Number of clubs: 8 (2021–present)
- Level on pyramid: 2
- Promotion to: A-Liga
- Relegation to: C-Liga
- Domestic cup: Danish Cup (1992–present)
- Website: www.b-liga.dk
- Current: 2026–27 B-Liga

B-Liga (formerly the Danish Women's 1st Division) is an association football league in Denmark and the second-highest division of the Danish football league system. Contested by 8 clubs, it operates on a system of promotion and relegation within the Danish Women's Football League.

== Format ==
The B-Liga consists of 8 teams playing in a double round-robin tournament, with home and away games. The teams that finish in the top four spots compete in the qualification play-offs against the two worst ranked A-Liga teams to determine two promotion spots. The four bottom placed teams instead play against the two top placed teams from each of the C-Liga groups in the B-Liga qualification play-offs. The two bottom placed teams from the 1st division qualification play-offs are relegated to C-Liga. Both the A-Liga and B-Liga qualification play-offs consist of a double round-robin tournaments among the six participating teams. This has been the format since the 2021–2022 season.

=== Changes ===
Until and including the 2006–07 season, the B-Liga comprised 12 teams playing a double round-robin tournament – each team playing each other twice; once home, once away. The champion was promoted to the A-Liga, called Elitedivisionen at the time. The runner-up played a promotion game against the second worst placed team of the A-Liga for a spot in the next season of A-Liga. Meanwhile, the two worst ranked teams were relegated to C-Liga, known as the Women's Denmark Series at the time.

B-Liga was reduced to 10 teams from the 2007–08 season.

From 2013–14 until the 2019–20 season, the B-Liga was expanded to include 16 teams, divided into two groups - East and West - each consisting of eight teams. The highest ranked team from each group would play in the A-Liga qualification play-offs together against the four lowest-ranked teams of A-Liga. The top two teams in the qualification play-offs achieved promotion to the A-Liga.

The 2020–21 B-Liga contained 20 teams, split into four groups of five, each playing a double roun-robin tournament. The top two teams of each group advanced to promotion qualifiers, split into two groups of four. A total of four teams advanced to the qualification play-offs. The remaining 12 teams were in the relegation play-offs, consisting of two groups of six teams each.

== Clubs ==
=== 2026–27 season ===
Note that a fair few clubs have never been in C-Liga as it was created in 2021 and any relegations before then were to the non-league fourth tier Denmark Series.

Club	#	Since	Total	C-Liga	A-Liga	Notes
B.93	2	2025	8	—N/a	2024–25	
Esbjerg fB (Note: Esbjerg is an amalgamation of Varde IF and Esbjerg fB. The club inherited Varde IF's license following the 2024–25 season.)	7	2020	21	—N/a	2017–18	The stats are the erstwhile Varde IF's and then Esbjerg's from 2025 onwards.
Næstved HG (Note: Næstved is an amalgamation of Herlufsholm GF and Næstved IF.)	6	2021	12	—N/a	1986	Est. 2021; competed in the top-flight as Næstved IF
Sundby	1	2026	11	2025–26	2022–23	
Thy-Thisted	3	2024	10	—N/a	2023–24	
Viborg FF	1	2026	10	2025–26	2014–15	Formerly Team Viborg's stats, Viborg FF took over the license in 2023.
Østerbro	5	2022	12	2021–22	—N/a	
AaB	3	2024	10	2017–18	2023–24	

Source: Danish Football Association

=== B-Liga seasons ===
A list of all the clubs that have played in the second tier of the Danish Women's Football League since its inception in 1993. Several teams have merged over the years to form the current clubs, the combined results of which will be displayed where noted. The teams in bold compete in the B-Liga currently, while the teams in italics are now defunct.

Incomplete

#	Club	Total	Latest
1	**Esbjerg fB** (Note: Competed as Varde IF until their merger in 2025)	21	2027
2	VSK (Note: Competed as Vejlby until the 2017 merger with Skovbakken. From 2020 onwards the reserve team of AGF, thus ineligible for promotion since the 2021 introduction of C-Liga (3rd tier). Tally includes one of Lyseng's seasons as AGF reserves, as Lyseng left AGF in 2024.)	15	2018
3	Midtjylland (Note: Competed as Vildbjerg SF until their merger in 2024)	14	2025
3	SønderjyskE (Note: Competed as Vojens until 2004)	14	2018
5	Copenhagen (Note: Competed as Damsø until the est. of Copenhagen in 2024)	13	2026
6	ASA	12	2026
6	**Næstved HG**	12	2027
6	Stensballe (Note: Previously competing as Horsens SIK as part of a merger with Horsens FC from 2000–2015)	12	2016
6	**Østerbro**	12	2027
10	**Sundby**	11	2027
11	Nykøbing FC (Note: Previously competed as B 1921, before the latter was subsumed into NFC in 2013)	10	2014
11	**Thy-Thisted**	10	2027
11	**Viborg FF**	10	2027
11	**AaB**	10	2027
15	Dalum/Næsby	9	2023
15	Kolding IF	9	2008
17	B52/Aalborg FC	8	2008
17	**B.93**	8	2027
17	Lunde	8	2008
20	B1913	7	2015
20	BK Skjold	7	2012
20	BSF	7	2024
20	Vorup FB	7	2016
24	Raklev	6	2015
24	Taastrup FC	6	2011
24	Aalborg Freja	6	2021
27	HB Køge	5	2020
27	OB Q	5	2024
29	B73 Slagelse	4	2011
29	Fortuna Hjørring II^{R}	4	2021
29	Frederiksberg BK	4	2021
29	Lyseng (Note: Lyseng competed as AGF reserves for one 2nd tier season, 2020/21, but left AGF in 2024.)	4	2020
29	Skjold Birkerød	4	2018
34	Greve	3	2019
34	Hillerød	3	
34	M/V-05 Holbæk	3	2007
34	Aarhus 1900	3	2021
38	AB Tårnby	2	2010
38	BK Femina	2	2001
38	Brøndby	2	2000
38	JAI Fodbold	2	2021
38	Randers Q (Note: Previously competed as Romalt IF before Randers Q was established in 2023.)	2	2021
38	Rødovre	2	2016
38	Solrød FC	2	2025
38	Vejle B	2	2019
46	Brønshøj Boldklub	1	1996
46	BSF II^{R}	1	
46	Fredensborg BI	1	2021
46	Fredericia KFUM	1	2012
46	Frederiksværk FK	1	2012
46	Fortuna Svendborg	1	2015
46	Freja Sydjælland	1	2005
46	HB-FC Horsens	1	1999
46	Kolding IF II^{R}	1	
46	Lemvig GF	1	1993
46	Mejrup	1	1997
46	Ringsted IF	1	2001
46	Skårup IF	1	2004
46	TST Sabro	1	2006

Key

^{R} indicates the reserve team for its parent A-Liga team (before 2021 when the 3rd division was created).

== See also ==
- A-Liga
- C-Liga
- Danish Women's Cup
