= Viborg FF (women) =

Association football club in Denmark

- Full name: Viborg Fodsports Forening
- Nickname: De Grønne (Greens)
- Short name: VFF
- Founded: 1969; 57 years ago (as Team Viborg)
- Ground: Liseborg Center
- Capacity: 1,500
- Coordinates: 56.4326°N 9.3760°E
- Coach: Jakob Glerup
- League: B-Liga
- 2025–26: C-Liga, 4th of 6 (promoted)
Home colours	Away colours

Viborg Fodsports Forening (lit. 'Viborg Footsport Association'; commonly known as Viborg FF or simply VFF) is a Danish association football club based in the Central Jutland city of Viborg. The club competes in B-Liga, the second tier of the Danish Women's Football League and play their home matches at Liseborg Center, with some matches played at Viborg Stadium. The club was founded in 1969.

== History ==
Viborg entered a collaboration with Søndermarkens IK and Houlkær IF in 2001 as Team Viborg to strengthen the local football's chances at competing in the Danish Women's Football League. The collaboration was fairly successful in its endeavour and lasted until July 2011 when Viborg FF withdrew from the organisation, alongside Houlkær IF. Viborg FF played six seasons in the top-flight as part of Team Viborg. In 2023 Viborg joined forces with Team Viborg again, this time in the Viborg FF organisation, taking over Team Viborg's license as the club had secured promotion to the 2nd Division, the third tier of the Danish Women's Football League. The club played under Team Viborg's moniker until spring 2025.

== Players ==
=== Current squad ===
As of 15 August 2026

Note: Flags indicate national team as defined under FIFA eligibility rules; some limited exceptions apply. Players may hold more than one non-FIFA nationality.

No.	Pos.	Nation	Player
1	GK	DEN	Sofie Fly
2	DF	DEN	Katrine Bærentsen
3	DF	DEN	Amalie Burchardt Lauge
4	MF	DEN	Mille Søndergaard
6	MF	DEN	Laura Nørskov
7	MF	DEN	Nicoline Mark
8	DF	DEN	Frida Nørgaard (captain)
10	MF	DEN	Frida Smed
12	DF	DEN	Anne Hougaard
13	MF	DEN	Maiken Danielsen
14	MF	DEN	Marie Louring

No.	Pos.	Nation	Player
15	MF	DEN	Cecilie Agerholm
16	MF	DEN	Cecilie Mossing
18	DF	DEN	Maja Henriksen
19	MF	DEN	Ida Holm Henriksen
20		DEN	Signe Chalatsis
21	DF	DEN	Thea Bønding
22	DF	DEN	Freia Lærke Madsen
25	MF	DEN	Thea Glerup
29	DF	DEN	Ida Velling Gundersen
99	GK	DEN	Emilia Grubak Smidt

== Management ==
=== Coaching staff ===
Role	Name
Head Coach	(Denmark) Jakob Glerup
Assistant Coach	(Denmark) Jan Guldager
Goalkeeping Coach	(Denmark) Brian Gade
Team Manager	(Denmark) Poul Lauge

=== Club ===
Role	Name
Head of Football	(Denmark) Morten Lynderup Jensen
Head of Academy	(Denmark) Allan Drost

=== Managers ===
Years	Name
2022–	(Denmark) Jakob Glerup
2016–	(Denmark) Jørgen Bøgelund
2015–2016	(Denmark) Keld Østergaard
2012–2015	(Denmark) Nickolai Lund

== Seasons ==
As of the 2025–26 season

Key
Champions	Promotion
Silver	Relegation
Bronze	

Incomplete

Season	Tier	#	W	D	L	F	A	Pts.	Cup
1996–97	2	5th of 8	3	4	6	13	20	15	
AS TEAM VIBORG
2023–24	3	1st of 6	4	2	6	13	23	14	
2024–25	3	1st of 5	4	4	2	9	5	16	
VIBORG FF
2025–26	3	4th of 6	8	2	2	32	11	26	1st round
2026–27	2	Season in progress							

Sources: Viborg FF – Danish Football Association (in Danish)

== See also ==
- Viborg FF (men's team)
