= Boldklubben af 1893 (women) =

Danish women's association football team

B.93
- Full name: Boldklubben af 1893
- Nickname: Byens Ægte Hold (The True City Team)
- Founded: November 1993; 33 years ago
- Ground: Østerbro Stadium
- Capacity: 4,400
- Owner: B.93 Q ApS
- Chairman: Jesper Holm Lauridsen
- Coach: Søren Fjorting
- League: B-Liga
- 2025–26: B-Liga, 2nd of 8
- Website: B.93 Squad
Home colours	Away colours	Third colours

Boldklubben af 1893 (commonly referred to as B.93) is a Danish football club based in Østerbro, Copenhagen. The team competes in the B-Liga, the second tier of the Danish Women's Football League.

== History ==
The club was founded in November 1993 when Janne Hjulmand proposed a women's team at the annual men's club assembly. The proposal passed by a large majority. The first team was assembled two years later in December 1995. The first 11-a-side team was fielded in 1996, starting in Series 2, the 6th tier of Danish women's football, which they won in their first season. The team was promoted in 1999 after two years in Series 1, the 5th tier, to the Copenhagen Series, the 4th tier, after placing second in Series 1.

In 2024 the team temporarily had to vacate their home grounds at Østerbro Stadium due to renovations. They were housed through 2025 and the first half of 2026 at Vanløse Sports Park Stadium, which is town rivals Copenhagen's home stadium. There were delays in the renovation works, but B.93 were able to return to their home grounds in June 2026.

== Players ==
As of 27 September 2026

Note: Flags indicate national team as defined under FIFA eligibility rules; some limited exceptions apply. Players may hold more than one non-FIFA nationality.

No.	Pos.	Nation	Player
1	GK	DEN	Alma Meier
2	FW	DEN	Freja Vestfred
3	DF	DEN	Katrine Krag-Andersen
4		DEN	Thea Roque-Krag
5	DF	DEN	Andrea Guy
6	DF	DEN	Alexandra Holse
7	MF	DEN	Freja Abildå (captain)
8	MF	DEN	Clara Stenbæk
9	DF	ENG	Laiba Khan
10	FW	DEN	Luna Bruun
11	MF	DEN	Frederikke Krongaard
12	GK	DEN	Signe Munk
13	FW	DEN	Jazmin Issa
14	DF	DEN	Laura Klitte
15	MF	DEN	Silja Snerle
16	GK	DEN	Sibille Svendsen

No.	Pos.	Nation	Player
17		DEN	Karla Borre
18	FW	DEN	Nanna Billesø
19	MF	DEN	Emma Drewes
20		DEN	Maria Slott
21	FW	DEN	Laura Lund
22	DF	DEN	Emilie Ramskov
23	MF	DEN	Edith Rixen
24	MF	DEN	Kajsa Møller
25	GK	DEN	Mira Pastoft
26	MF	DEN	Signe Dylmer
27	DF	DEN	Louise Ringsing
29	FW	DEN	Sophie Bagger
30	MF	DEN	Emilie Rydahl
—	MF	DEN	Olga Danielsen
—	MF	DEN	Ella Vintersbølle
—		DEN	Frederikke Alban

=== Captains ===
Incomplete

Years	Player
2025–	(Denmark) Freja Abildå
	(Denmark) Signe Munk
2022–2023	(Uganda) Vanessa Karungi
2021–2022	(Denmark) Nicoline Heilstrup
2018–2020	(Denmark) Nikoline Andresen
2016–2018	(Denmark) Mette Perthu

== Management ==
=== Coaching staff ===
As of 9 May 2026

Role	Name
Head Coach	(Denmark) Søren Fjorting
Assistant Coach	(Denmark) Nikolaj Kragh Jeppesen
Fitness Coach	(Denmark) Asmus Nielsen
Goalkeeping Coach	(Denmark) Nicolas Manley Nielsen
Kit Manager	(Denmark) Lise-Lotte Jørgensen
Physiotherapist	(Denmark) Lau Edinger

=== Club ===
Role	Name
Chairman	(Denmark) Jesper Holm Lauridsen
Sporting Director	(Denmark) Tonny Jørgensen

=== Managers ===
Years	Coach
2026–	(Denmark) Søren Fjorting
2026	(Denmark) Nikolaj Jeppesen & Tonny Jørgensen (interim)
2024–2025	(Denmark) Christian Falk
2024	(Denmark) Peer Lisdorf
2020–2023	(Denmark) Rasmus Good
2018–2020	(Denmark) Anders Vang
2018	(Spain) Jessica Rodríguez
2017	(Denmark) Rasmus Skovby
	(Denmark) Maria Dong-Kruse
2012–2014	(United States) Denise Reddy

== Seasons ==
As of the 2025–26 season

Key
(gold) Champions	Promotion
(silver) Silver	Relegation
(bronze) Bronze	

Incomplete

Season	Tier	#	W	D	L	F	A	Pts.	Cup	UWCL
2021–22	2	3rd of 8	6	4	4	16	9	22		
2022–23	2	3rd of 8	7	3	4	27	14	24	2nd round	
2023–24	2	2nd of 8	9	3	2	36	16	30	QF	
2024–25	1	7th of 8	2	2	10	10	36	8	3rd round	
2025–26	2	2nd of 6	4	1	9	21	40	13	2nd round	
2026–27	2	Upcoming season								

Sources: Tipsbladet (in Danish), B.93 league history – Danish Football Association (in Danish)

== See also ==
- Boldklubben af 1893, men's team
