= Hjørring Stadium =

Stadium located in Hjørring, Denmark

Hjørring Stadium Nord Energi Arena
- Danmarks mest bæredygtige stadion
- Interactive map of Hjørring Stadium; Nord Energi Arena
- Full name: Nord Energi Arena
- Former names: Hjørring Stadion (1930–2014); Femhøje Stadion - Hjørring (2014–present); Bredbånd Nord Arena (2015–2017); Nord Energi Arena (2017–present)
- Location: Tørholmsvej 10; 9800 Hjørring
- Coordinates: 57°27′28″N 9°59′55″E
- Owner: Hjørring Municipality
- Capacity: 10,000 (3,100 seatings)
- Surface: Natural grass
- Field size: 105 by 65 metres (114.8 yd × 71.1 yd)

Construction
- Opened: 1930
- Renovated: 2014–2015
- Expanded: 2019
- Cost: DKK 35 million (2014–2015); DKK 17.5 million (2019)
- Project managers: Lund & Staun ApS (2014–2015); Vennelyst Ingeniør- og Entreprenørforretning (2019)

Tenants
- Fortuna Hjørring; Vendsyssel FF (2013–present); Dana Cup (1982–present); FC Hjørring (2006–2013); Hjørring IF (until 2006)

Hjørring Stadium (Danish: Hjørring Stadion) is a multi-purpose stadium located in Hjørring, Denmark, that is part of Femhøje Sport Center, and hence also known as Femhøje Stadion – Hjørring. It is currently used mostly for association football matches and is the home stadium of Fortuna Hjørring and Vendsyssel FF. The stadium, which is owned and operated by Hjørring Municipality, has a maximum capacity of 10,000 people of which 3,100 are seats. The attendance record of 7,919 spectators was set on 3 June 1973 in a match in the western group of Danish 3rd Division between Hjørring IF and local rivals Frederikshavn fI. It has been known as Nord Energi Arena for sponsorship reasons since July 2017 and had previously been referred to as Bredbånd Nord Arena (2015–2017).

== New Stadium ==
In September 2011 it was decided that Hjørring should have a new stadium, linked to the Park Vendia which would be completed in 2013.

The plan, however, changed when Hjørring came into trouble in terms of the economy to the construction of the new stadium.

== Renovation ==
On May 29, 2013 Hjørring City Council decided to renovate the old stadium. The renovation includes a new and lasting main stand with two sports centers integrated in the back of it. The new main stand with sponsor lounge will accommodate 500 seats under roof.

Opposite the main stand is a small terrace with a capacity of around 1500 people. In order to optimize the intimacy and match experience the fences and advertising boards in both ends were placed closer to the pitch than before.

There is also a new lighting system of 1000 lux. The renovation was completed in the summer 2015.

In the summer of 2018 Vendsyssel FF earned a promotion to the Superliga. To be eligible to play in the highest tier, the stadium needs a total capacity of at least 10,000 people and at least 3,000 seats.
