= List of 2026–27 A-Liga transfers =

Danish football league transfers 2026–27 season

This article lists the 2026–27 A-Liga transfers taking place between 30 June 2026 and 1 July 2027 in the top flight of the Danish Women's Football League.

== AGF ==
ENTER
Date	Position	Nationality	Player	From	Contract ends	Fee	Ref.
13 July 2026	CB	(Denmark)	Laura Guldbjerg	(Spain) Real Oviedo		Free transfer	
14 July 2026	CB	(Denmark)	Julie Poulsen	Free agent		Free transfer	
1 August 2026	CM	(Denmark)	Milla Ahrenholt	Free agent		Free transfer	
2 August 2026	CM	(Denmark)	Lærke Tingleff	(Portugal) FC Porto		Undisclosed	
4 September 2026	CB	(Denmark)	Caroline Ahle	(Denmark) Midtjylland		Undisclosed	
11 September 2026	CM	(Denmark)	Carla Schulz	(Denmark) OB Q			

EXIT
Date	Position	Nationality	Player	To	Fee	Ref.
30 June 2026 (Note: Departure announced on 31 May 2026.)	CB	(Denmark)	Laura Kjærsgård	Free agent	Released	
30 June 2026 (Note: Transfer announced on 6 June 2026.)	CM	(Denmark)	Elvira Nejmann	(Denmark) Brøndby	Free transfer	
30 June 2026 (Note: Departures announced on 2 July 2026.)	CB	(Denmark)	Johanne Guldbæk	Free agent	Released	
30 June 2026	CB	(Denmark)	Sofie Vendelbo	Free agent	Released	
30 June 2026	CM	(Finland)	Veera Hellman	Free agent	Released	
30 June 2026	CM	(Denmark)	Mille Larsen	Free agent	Released	
30 June 2026	CB	(Denmark)	Pernille Madsen	Free agent	Released	
22 July 2026	CB	(Denmark)	Julie Mathiasen	(Sweden) FC Rosengård	Undisclosed	
14 August 2026	CM	(Denmark)	Signe Baattrup	(Denmark) Midtjylland	Undisclosed	

== ASA ==
ENTER
Date	Position	Nationality	Player	From	Contract ends	Fee	Ref.
15 July 2026	CB	(Denmark)	Pernille Madsen	Free agent		Free transfer	
15 July 2026	CB	(Denmark)	Malene Nielsen	Free agent		Free transfer	
16 July 2026	CM	(Denmark)	Frida Binderup	(Denmark) Midtjylland		Undisclosed	
28 July 2026	GK	(Denmark)	Frieda Jensen	Free agent		Free transfer	
29 July 2026	FW	(Denmark)	Fie Nordmark	(Denmark) Midtjylland		Free transfer	
2 August 2026	CM	(Denmark)	Ida Thomsen	(Denmark) Midtjylland		Undisclosed	

EXIT
Date	Position	Nationality	Player	To	Fee	Ref.
30 June 2026 (Note: Transfer announced on 13 June 2026.)	CB	(Denmark)	Helle Fyhn	Retired		

== Brøndby ==
ENTER
Date	Position	Nationality	Player	From	Contract ends	Fee	Ref.
1 July 2026 (Note: Transfer announced on 27 May 2026.)	GK	(Denmark)	Isabella Andersen	Brøndby U19	2028	—N/a	
1 July 2026 (Note: Transfer announced on 6 June 2026.)	CM	(Denmark)	Elvira Nejmann	(Denmark) AGF	2028	Free transfer	
1 July 2026 (Note: Transfer announced on 12 June 2026.)	FW	(Denmark)	Amalie Thestrup	(England) Charlton	2028	Free transfer	
1 July 2026 (Note: Transfer announced on 16 June 2026.)	CM	(United States)	Emma Pelkowski	(Denmark) HB Køge	2028	Undisclosed	
1 July 2026 (Note: Transfer announced on 27 June 2026.)	DM	(Scotland)	Amy Rodgers	(England) Nottingham Forest	2028	Undisclosed	
8 July 2026	GK	(Uganda)	Vanessa Karungi	(Denmark) Nordsjælland		Free transfer	
10 July 2026	CM	(Sweden)	Hanna Andersson	(Sweden) FC Rosengård	2028	Free transfer	
12 July 2026	CB	(United States)	Michaela Kovacs	(England) Birmingham City	2027	Free transfer	
28 August 2026	FW	(Norway)	Rakel Engesvik	(Portugal) Benfica	2027	Free transfer	

EXIT
Date	Position	Nationality	Player	To	Fee	Ref.
30 June 2026 (Note: Departure announced on 4 June 2026.)	FW	(Denmark)	Nanna Christiansen	Retired		
30 June 2026 (Note: Departure announced on 15 June 2025.)	CM	(Norway)	Julie Jorde	Free agent	Released	
30 June 2026 (Note: Departure announced on 15 June 2025.)	CB	(Norway)	Tanja Myrseth	Free agent	Released	
30 June 2026 (Note: Departure announced on 15 June 2025.)	FW	(Denmark)	Agnete Nielsen	Free agent	Released	
30 June 2026 (Note: Departure announced on 19 June 2026.)	AM	(Denmark)	Dajan Hashemi	Free agent	Released	
30 June 2026	GK	(Denmark)	Mira Pastoft	Free agent	Released	
17 July 2026	GK	(Denmark)	Isabella Damm	(England) Arsenal	Undisclosed	
17 July 2026	WB	(Denmark)	Linnéa Borbye	(Italy) Como	Undisclosed	
30 July 2026	CM	(Denmark)	Emilie Holt	(Spain) Madrid CFF	Undisclosed	
16 August 2026	CM	(Denmark)	Selma Karstensen	(Denmark) Sundby	Released	
28 August 2026	CB	(Norway)	Emma Braut Brunes	(Norway) Brann	Undisclosed	

== Copenhagen ==
ENTER
Date	Position	Nationality	Player	From	Contract ends	Fee	Ref.
7 July 2026	FW	(Denmark)	Rebeka Winther	(Denmark) HB Køge		Undisclosed	
18 July 2026	FW	(Finland)	Dana Leskinen	(Italy) Parma		Undisclosed	
11 August 2026	FW	(Denmark)	Anisa Saini	Free agent	2026	Free transfer	
1 September 2026	AM	(Denmark)	Sarah Jankovska	Free agent		Free transfer	
2 September 2026	GK	(South Africa)	Jessica Williams	Free agent		Free transfer	

EXIT
Date	Position	Nationality	Player	To	Fee	Ref.
30 June 2026	FW	(Iceland)	Emelía Oskarsdottír	(Denmark) HB Køge	End of loan	
30 June 2026 (Note: Departures announced on 11 June 2026.)	CB	(Denmark)	Cecilie Byrnak	Free agent	Released	
30 June 2026	GK	(Denmark)	Anna Kaas	Free agent	Released	
30 June 2026	FW	(Denmark)	Thea Rhode	Free agent	Released	
30 June 2026	CM	(Belgium)	Laura Vervacke	Free agent	Released	
30 June 2026 (Note: Departure announced on 12 June 2026.)	CB	(Denmark)	Julie Nowak	Retired		
30 June 2026 (Note: Departure announced on 17 June 2026.)	CB	(Denmark)	Celine Kampmann	(United States) Virginia Tech Hokies	Released	
9 August 2026	FW	(Denmark)	Paula Groth-Hansen	Free agent	Released	
15 August 2026	FW	(Denmark)	Josefine Lech	Retired		

== Fortuna Hjørring ==
ENTER
Date	Position	Nationality	Player	From	Contract ends	Fee	Ref.
7 July 2026	GK	(Denmark)	Freja Thisgaard	(Italy) Napoli	2028	Undisclosed	
10 July 2026	DM	(Denmark)	Sofie Junge Pedersen	(Spain) Badalona	2027	Free transfer	
24 July 2026	CM	(United States)	Ashley Riefner	Free agent	2027	Free transfer	
25 July 2026	CB	(Colombia)	Samantha Rodríguez	(Colombia) Bucaramanga W	2028		
28 July 2026	FW	(Sweden)	Emma Westin	(Scotland) Celtic	2028	Undisclosed	
13 August 2026	FW	(Denmark)	Rebekka Frederiksen	Free agent		Free transfer	
15 August 2026	CB	(Nigeria)	Oyinlola Shakirat Olamide	(Lithuania) MFA Zalgiris-MRU	2028	Undisclosed	
1 October 2026	CM	(Denmark)	Johanne Guldbæk	Free agent		Free transfer	

EXIT
Date	Position	Nationality	Player	To	Fee	Ref.
30 June 2026	CM	(Denmark)	Vibeke Andersen	(Denmark) HB Køge	End of loan	
30 June 2026 (Note: Departure announced on 19 February 2026.)	ST	(Denmark)	Nikoline Nielsen	(Spain) Barcelona B	Free transfer	
30 June 2026 (Note: Departures announced on 19 June 2026.)	CB	(Finland)	Tiia Peltonen	Free agent	Released	
30 June 2026	CM	(United States)	Ashley Riefner	Free agent	Released	
30 June 2026 (Note: Departures announced on 23 June 2026.)	LB	(Sweden)	Tilde Johansson	Free agent	Released	
30 June 2026	CM	(Denmark)	Sofie Lybæk	Free agent	Released	
30 June 2026	CB	(Japan)	Miyu Takahira	Free agent	Released	
19 July 2026	GK	(Finland)	Milla-Maj Majasaari	(Denmark) Midtjylland	Undisclosed	
21 July 2026	CM	(Germany)	Samantha Kühne	Free agent	Released	

== HB Køge ==
ENTER
Date	Position	Nationality	Player	From	Contract ends	Fee	Ref.
30 June 2026	FW	(Denmark)	Rebeka Winther	(Denmark) OB Q		End of loan	
30 June 2026	CB	(Denmark)	Laura Sehested	(Denmark) OB Q		End of loan	
1 July 2026 (Note: Transfer announced in January 2026.)	FW	(United States)	Kyra Carusa	(United States) Kansas City Current		End of loan	
1 July 2026 (Note: Transfer announced 23 May 2026.)	CB	(United States)	Sydney Jones	(United States) Kansas City Current II		Undisclosed	
1 July 2026 (Note: Transfer announced 5 June 2026.)	LB	(Denmark)	Andrea Termansen	(Denmark) Kolding		Undisclosed	
1 July 2026 (Note: Transfer announced on 19 June 2026.)	GK	(United States)	Lauren Kozal	(Switzerland) Grasshopper		Undisclosed	
1 July 2026 (Note: Transfer announced on 23 June 2026.)	FW	(Norway)	Nadia Tahirukaj	(Norway) Kolbotn		Undisclosed	
1 July 2026 (Note: Transfer announced on 24 June 2026.)	GK	(Poland)	Julia Gutowska	(Poland) Rekord Bielsko-Biała		Undisclosed	
1 July 2026 (Note: Transfers announced on 25 June 2026.)	FW	(Sweden)	Kaia Carruthers	(Sweden) Kristianstads DFF		Undisclosed	
9 July 2026	CM	(Denmark)	Laura Hermann	(France) Saint-Étienne		Undisclosed	
10 July 2026	LB	(United States)	Emma Flick	(United States) Xavier Musketeers		Undisclosed	
10 July 2026	CB	(Japan)	Yukina Sakabe	(Japan) Tokyo Verdy Beleza		Undisclosed	
11 July 2026	CM	(Poland)	Zuzanna Witek	(Poland) Czarni Sosnowiec		Undisclosed	
31 July 2026	ST	(Denmark)	Nadia Nadim	Free agent	2028		
18 August 2026	DM	(Japan)	Aemu Oyama	(England) Manchester City		Undisclosed	
25 September 2026	W	(Zambia)	Mercy Chipasula	(Zambia) Kamfinsa Blue Eagles		Undisclosed	

EXIT
Date	Position	Nationality	Player	To	Fee	Ref.
30 June 2026	ST	(Angola)	Flora Marta Lacho	(United States) Kansas City Current	End of loan	
30 June 2026	ST	(Denmark)	Nadia Nadim	Free agent	Released	
30 June 2026 (Note: Departures announced on 13 June 2026.)	CB	(United States)	Skylar Briggs	Free agent	Released	
30 June 2026	CB	(Netherlands)	Fleur Huisman	Free agent	Released	
30 June 2026	CM	(Sweden)	Emilia Pelgander	Free agent	Released	
30 June 2026	CB	(Denmark)	Silje Simonsen	Free agent	Released	
30 June 2026	CM	(Netherlands)	Lisa Stengs	Free agent	Released	
30 June 2026 (Note: Transfer announced on 16 June 2026.)	CM	(United States)	Emma Pelkowski	(Denmark) Brøndby	Undisclosed	
30 June 2026 (Note: Retirement announced on 19 June 2026.)	CM	(Denmark)	Vibeke Andersen	Retired		
30 June 2026 (Note: Departures announced on 21 June 2026.)	CB	(Denmark)	Laura Sehested	Free agent	Released	
30 June 2026	FW	(Denmark)	Rebeka Winther	Free agent	Released	
22 July 2026	GK	(Serbia)	Ema Aleksić	(Denmark) Kolding IF	Undisclosed	
4 August 2026	CB	(United States)	Avani Brandt	(Netherlands) Feyenoord	Undisclosed	
1 September 2026	FW	(Denmark)	Rose Blinge	(Denmark) Næstved HG	Undisclosed	
1 September 2026	LB	(Denmark)	Signe Markvardsen	(England) Bristol City	Undisclosed (Note: Was reportedly the club's record transfer until the Korhonen deal.)	
10 September 2026	FW	(Sweden)	Cassandra Korhonen	(England) Charlton	Undisclosed (Note: Reportedly the club's new record transfer.)	

== Kolding ==
ENTER
Date	Position	Nationality	Player	From	Contract ends	Fee	Ref.
1 July 2026 (Note: Transfer announced on 17 June 2026.)	CB	(Denmark)	Laura Colstrup	(Denmark) Nordsjælland		Undisclosed	
20 July 2026	FW	(Denmark)	Cecilie Byrnak	(Denmark) Copenhagen	2028	Undisclosed	
22 July 2026	GK	(Serbia)	Ema Aleksić	(Denmark) HB Køge		Undisclosed	
26 August 2026	CM	(Denmark)	Mille Kjærgaard	Free agent		Free transfer	
3 September 2026	CB	(United States)	Esmé Brayshaw	(United States) Georgetown Hoyas		Free transfer	
8 September 2026	CB	(United States)	Kendra Maki	(United States) DC Power FC		Undisclosed	
20 September 2026	CB	(Denmark)	Silje Simonsen	Free agent		Free transfer	

EXIT
Date	Position	Nationality	Player	To	Fee	Ref.
30 June 2026 (Note: Departures announced on 6 June 2026.)	CM	(Denmark)	Lærke Friis	Free agent	Released	
30 June 2026	GK	(Denmark)	Sofie Grøn	Free agent	Released	
30 June 2026	CB	(Denmark)	Julie Poulsen	Free agent	Released	
30 June 2026	CB	(Denmark)	Andrea Termansen	(Denmark) HB Køge	Undisclosed	
30 June 2026	AM	(Denmark)	Josefine Uhd	(Denmark) Midtjylland	Undisclosed	
28 July 2026	FW	(Denmark)	Signe Søndergård	(Italy) Parma	Undisclosed	
31 July 2026	CB	(Denmark)	Milla Ahrenholt	Free agent	Released	
8 October 2026	FW	(Denmark)	Kamma Fredsted	Retired		

== Midtjylland ==
ENTER
Date	Position	Nationality	Player	From	Contract ends	Fee	Ref.
1 July 2026	AM	(Denmark)	Josefine Uhd	(Denmark) Kolding	2028 (+2)	Undisclosed	
3 July 2026	CB	(Denmark)	Sofie Vendelbo	(Denmark) AGF		Free transfer	
8 July 2026	DM	(Denmark)	Tervie Umwe	(Denmark) Esbjerg		Undisclosed	
19 July 2026	GK	(Finland)	Milla-Maj Majasaari	(Denmark) Fortuna Hjørring		Undisclosed	
14 August 2026	CM	(Denmark)	Signe Baattrup	(Denmark) AGF		Undisclosed	

EXIT
Date	Position	Nationality	Player	To	Fee	Ref.
30 June 2026 (Note: Departures announced on 2 June 2026.)	CM	(Denmark)	Frida Binderup	Free agent	Released	
30 June 2026	CB	(Denmark)	Anne Hougaard	Free agent	Released	
30 June 2026	CB	(Denmark)	Clara Jepsen	Free agent	Released	
30 June 2026	CB	(Denmark)	Malene Nielsen	Free agent	Released	
30 June 2026	FW	(Denmark)	Fie Nordmark	Free agent	Released	
30 June 2026	CB	(Denmark)	Freya Rossen	Free agent	Released	
30 June 2026	CM	(Denmark)	Ida Thomsen	Free agent	Released	
30 June 2026	CB	(Denmark)	Ida Olsen	Free agent	Undisclosed	
30 June 2026 (Note: Transfer announced on 11 June 2026.)	CB	(Denmark)	Josefine Bækgaard	(Denmark) Esbjerg	Undisclosed	
30 June 2026 (Note: Transfer announced on 14 June 2026.)	CM	(Denmark)	Sofia Rejkjær	(Germany) Turbine Potsdam	Undisclosed	
29 July 2026	FW	(Denmark)	Fie Nordmark	(Denmark) ASA	Free transfer	
26 August 2026	CM	(Denmark)	Mille Kjærgaard	(Denmark) Kolding IF	Free transfer	
4 September 2026	CB	(Denmark)	Caroline Ahle	(Denmark) AGF	Undisclosed	

== Nordsjælland ==
ENTER
Date	Position	Nationality	Player	From	Contract ends	Fee	Ref.
30 June 2026	FW	(Denmark)	Signe Tingager	(Denmark) B.93		End of loan	
1 July 2026 (Note: Transfer announced on 28 April 2026.)	FW	(Ivory Coast)	Safi N'Sira	Right to Dream Academy		—N/a	
27 August 2026	GK	(Finland)	Helmi Vihervuori	(Finland) HJK Helsinki	2029	Undisclosed	
17 October 2026	MF	(South Africa)	Sibulele Holweni	(South Africa) UWC		Undisclosed	

EXIT
Date	Position	Nationality	Player	To	Fee	Ref.
30 June 2026 (Note: Departure announced on 4 February 2026.)	CM	(Denmark)	Josefine Funch	(Netherlands) PSV Eindhoven	Undisclosed	
30 June 2026 (Note: Departure announced on 5 May 2026.)	FW	(Denmark)	Anna Walter	(Sweden) Hammarby	Undisclosed	
30 June 2026 (Note: Departures announced on 5 June 2026.)	GK	(Uganda)	Vanessa Karungi	Free agent	Released	
30 June 2026	FW	(Ghana)	Princess Marfo	(Netherlands) PSV Eindhoven	Free transfer	
1 July 2026 (Note: Transfer announced on 17 June 2026.)	CB	(Denmark)	Laura Colstrup	(Denmark) Kolding	Undisclosed	
10 July 2026	FW	(Denmark)	Signe Tingager	(United States) Providence Friars	Undisclosed	
17 July 2026	GK	(Sweden)	Somea Položen	(Spain) Deportivo Alavés	Undisclosed	
1 September 2026	CM	(Denmark)	Cecilie Larsen	(Sweden) FC Rosengård	Undisclosed	

== OB Q ==
ENTER
Date	Position	Nationality	Player	From	Contract ends	Fee	Ref.
1 July 2026 (Note: Transfer announced on 29 June 2026.)	CM	(Denmark)	Lærke Friis	(Denmark) Kolding	2028	Undisclosed	
2 July 2026	LWB	(Australia)	Emma Ilijoski	(Scotland) Aberdeen	2028	Free transfer	
4 July 2026	CB	(Denmark)	Laura Holt	(Denmark) Thy-Thisted	2029	Undisclosed	
9 July 2026	CB	(Denmark)	Ida Olsen	Free agent	2027	Free transfer	
14 July 2026	CB	(Denmark)	Laura Sehested	Free agent	2026	Free transfer	
29 July 2026	FW	(Faroe Islands)	Anna Brændstrup	Free agent		Free transfer	

EXIT
Date	Position	Nationality	Player	To	Fee	Ref.
30 June 2026 (Note: Departures announced on 13 June 2026.)	CB	(Denmark)	Camilla Hjortsø	Free agent	Released	
30 June 2026	CB	(Denmark)	Laura Lund	Free agent	Released	
30 June 2026	CB	(Denmark)	Laura Sehested	(Denmark) HB Køge	End of loan	
30 June 2026	FW	(Denmark)	Rebeka Winther	(Denmark) HB Køge	End of loan	
1 July 2026	CB	(Denmark)	Maja Flyvholm	Free agent	Released	
13 July 2026	CB	(Denmark)	Meryem Baskaya	(Turkey) Galatasaray	Undisclosed	
11 September 2026	CM	(Denmark)	Carla Schulz	(Denmark) AGF		

== Loans ==
Date	Position	Nationality	Player	To	From	Loan ends	Ref.
4 September 2026	CB	(Denmark)	Andrea Friis	OB Q	HB Køge	31 December 2026	

=== In ===
Club	Date	Position	Nationality	Player	From	Loan ends	Ref.
Copenhagen	17 July 2026	W	(Sweden)	Maja Johansson	(Sweden) FC Rosengård	31 December 2026	

=== Out ===
Club	Date	Position	Nationality	Player	To	Loan ends	Ref.
Brøndby	7 August 2026	FW	(Norway)	Julie Klæboe	(Norway) Lillestrøm	31 December 2026	
