= 2021–22 Danish Women's 1st Division =

Danish 1st Division
- Season: 2021–22
- Dates: 7 August 2021—11 June 2022
- Matches: 56
- Goals: 153 (2.73 per match)
- Top goalscorer: Sissel Bøje; Kamilla Ørskov (9 goals each)
- Biggest home win: Varde 5–0 Vildbjerg (20 November 2021)
- Biggest away win: Dalum/Næsby 0–5 Sundby (11 September 2021)
- Highest scoring: Næstved HG 2–4 Varde (29 August 2021); Dalum/Næsby 4–2 Varde (16 October 2021); OB Q 5–1 Varde (6 November 2021)
- Longest winning run: 6 matches OB Q
- Longest unbeaten run: 7 matches OB Q
- Longest winless run: 6 matches Næstved HG
- Longest losing run: 6 matches Næstved HG
- Only matches in the regular season are covered in the statistics

The 2021–22 Danish Women's 1st Division was the 30th season of the second tier of the Danish Women's Football League.

From this season onwards, the two-pronged format was changed to a single division consisting of 8 teams for the first time since the 2012–13 season, but with 8 clubs instead of the erstwhile 10.

The season began on 7 August 2021 with two fixtures in the preliminary stage (Dalum/Næsby vs B.93 and OB Q vs Næstved HG) and concluded with the final four matches on 20 November 2021. All eight teams in the league took part in the previous season with four teams, OB Q, B.93, ASA and Sundby BK, proceeding to the Qualification League without gaining promotion to the top tier. The clubs in the division entered the 2021–22 Danish Women's Cup in the cup tournament's first round proper. The fixtures for the 2021–22 season were announced by the Danish FA's tournament committee and featured a twenty-week winter break.

In July 2021, Næstved HG was formed as a superstructure between Næstved IF Fodbold and the women's football department of Herlufsholm GF, assuming the league license of Herlufsholm GF. Prior to the start of the season, the co-operation between Dalum IF and Næsby BK, known as Dalum/Næsby, was extended to incorporate the first senior women's teams and assumed the league license of Næsby BK. OB Q, Sundby BK, B.93 and Varde IF finished in the league's top half following the conclusion of the preliminary round and progressed to the Qualification League featuring the two lowest placed teams from the preliminary round of the first division. The bottom half of the table progressed to the 1st Division play-off round, featuring two qualified teams from the preliminary round of the third division, which determined the promotion and/or relegation spots between the second and third tiers.

== Format ==
A Round-robin tournament where each team plays two games against each other team twice, home and away. Teams receive three points for a win and one point for a draw. If two or more teams are tied, ranking is determined by goal difference. The four teams with the most points at the end of the regular season qualify for the Danish League qualification play-offs against the two lowest placed teams of the first division. The remaining four teams, joined by the two highest-placed teams of the 2nd division, participate in the qualification play-offs, also a Round-robin tournament. The goal score and points from the regular season are reset. The two teams with the fewest points are relegated to the 2022–23 2nd Division.

== Summary ==
Due to economic difficulties and the lack of an elite organization, the women's football department of Herlufsholm GF approached Næstved IF Fodbold with the intention of creating a women's superstructure between the two clubs, which resulted in Næstved HG Kvindeelite being formed on 1 July 2021, playing based on the league license of Herlufsholm GF. The superstructure between the women's football departments of Dalum IF and Næsby BK, known as Dalum/Næsby Pigefodbold, originally included youth and reserve teams, but beginning this season, it was expanded to incorporate the first senior women's teams and assumed the league license of Næsby BK in the second division under the revised name of Dalum/Næsby Kvinde- og Pigefodbold. At the beginning of the season, B.93's first senior women's team, represented by B.93 Q ApS (a subsidiary of B.93 Kontrakt Fodbold ApS, who runs the men's first team), were the only club in the league to have a license from the Danish FA to sign professional contracts with its players. With the arrival of an investor and the creation of an anpartsselskab, OB Q was able to sign their first-ever semi-professional player contracts, starting with five players in August 2021. With an average age of nineteen, the players of Vildbjerg SF were reportedly among the youngest squads in the league, while Sundby BK's squad had an average age of 23 years.

The 2021–22 season was inaugurated on Saturday 7 August with two fixtures in the preliminary first round; Dalum/Næsby and B.93 played at Næsby Stadium, while OB Q and Næstved HG played at exhibition pitch at Marienlystcentret, marking the debut matches of the two new superstructure of Næstved HG and Dalum/Næsby. B.93's Viktoria Einsbor scored the first goal of the season in the 12th minute behind Dalum/Næsby's goalkeeper. Silje Cassandra Simonsen netted the second goal for B.93 in the 60th minute, securing a victory in the first match. The first round matches between Sundby BK vs Varde IF at Sundby Idrætspark and ASA vs Vildbjerg SF on the artificial turf at Frederiksbjerg Idrætsanlæg got postponed to 18 September. Sundby BK started playing their home matches at the exhibition pitch at Sundby Idrætspark starting from this season to comply with future league license criteria from the Danish FA, after previously having played their games at the amateur sports facilities of Kløvermarken next to their offices. The local derby between Sundby BK and B.93 on 20 August 2021 attracted an attendance of 350 spectators. In December 2021, Sundby BK announced that five investors would contribute to the professional and commercial department involving the first men's and women's teams.

The third round match between Næstved Herlufsholm Fodbold and Vildbjerg SF at Næstved Stadium was a repeat of last season's 1st Division championship final at Vildbjerg between Vildbjerg SF and the founding parent club Herlufsholm GF. While the 2020–21 division final was won by Herlufsholm GF with 6–1, in the present season's first encounter between the two teams Vildbjerg SF secured a 3–2 away win against NIF HG seven minutes before full time. Næstved HG's losing streak was extended to six games in a row, producing a bottom place in the table, and resulting in the management's sacking of head coach Jeppe Tengbjerg during the women's international match window. The first win of the season for Næstved HG was achieved in the seventh round, in the first match under the new head coach, and former sports director, Steen "Olsen" Hansen, by defeating Dalum/Næstby at their own home ground. Israeli international forward Rachel Shtainshnaider scored two goals and made an assist in NIF HG's third goal netted by Nicoline Dam Schrøder. With Steen Hansen unavailable for the home game against Sundby BK on 7 November 2021, Dennis Deleuran – the U-19 men's head coach of Næstved BK – stepped in as interim coach, guiding the Næstved HG's squad to their only second win of the 2021 fall season.

OB Q gained an early lead in the league standings by procuring five victories and five clean sheets in the first five games, with Swedish goalkeeper Isabelle Granlund recording eight clean sheets by the end of the fall season and captain Kamilla Ørskov Jensen shared top scorer title in the preliminary round together with Sissel Bøje of Sundby BK, both scoring nine goals. Ten league matches into the season, OB Q secured their participation in the Qualification League for two promotion spot to the next season's top-flight league and was joined by Sundby BK, B.93 and Varde IF after the 13th, 12th and 14th round respectively including the two lowest placed teams from the preliminary round of the Danish Women's League, AGF and AaB. ASA Fodbold, Dalum/Næsby Vildbjerg SF and Næstved HG moved on to the 1st Division play-off round for two relegation spots, together with the two winners of the 2nd Division preliminary round, Østerbro IF and JAI Fodbold.

== Teams ==
Eight teams competed in the league – four teams from the Qualification League and four teams from second division play-offs of the previous season. The four teams from the Qualification League were OB Q, B.93, ASA, and Sundby BK, who extended their spells in the second-tier of one, two, five, and nine years respectively, with B.93 having participated in the qualifications four seasons in a row. During the summer break, two new superstructures were formed, with Næstved HG assuming the league license of Herlufsholm GF, while Dalum/Næsby took Næsby BK's place in the second division.

=== Changes ===
1ST DIVISION ENTRIES		1ST DIVISION EXITS	
▲ from 2020–21 Denmark Series	▼ from 2020–21 Danish League	▲ to 2021–22 Danish League	▼ to 2021–22 2nd Division
–	–	–	BSF (Note: BSF was relegated from the 2019/20 Danish League); Østerbro IF (Note: These teams were in the 2019/20 1st Division); Damsø; Fortuna Hjørring II; IF Lyseng; JAI Fodbold; Aarhus 1900; Solrød FC (Note: These teams were in the 2019/20 Denmark Series); Fredensborg BI; Aalborg Freja

=== Stadiums and locations ===
Locations of the 2021–22 1st Division teams.

Club	Location	Stadium	Capacity
ASA	Aarhus C	Frederiksbjerg Sports Facilities	
B.93	Østerbro	Østerbro Stadium (Note: Three home matches, 14 August (vs Næstved HG), 6 November (vs Vildbjerg SF), and 13 November (vs Varde IF) played at the Svanemølleanlægget primary (#1) and secondary (#2) artificial pitches.)	3,800
Dalum/Næsby	Odense	Næsby Stadium (Note: The 20 November 2021 home match against Næstved HG was played at the Tingløkkeskolen artificial pitch in Dalum.)	
Næstved HG	Næstved	Næstved Stadium (Note: The 7 November 2021 match against Sundby BK was played at the artificial pitch of Næstved Idrætspark placed south of the club house.)	10,000
OB Q	Odense	Marienlystcentret	
Sundby BK	Amager	Sundby Idrætspark (Note: All matches for Sundby BK were played on the main football field inside the club's new home ground at Sundby Idrætspark's stadium.)	
Varde IF	Varde	Varde Stadium (Note: The 20 November 2021 match against Vildbjerg SF was played at the Varde Stadium artificial pitch.)	
Vildbjerg SF	Vildbjerg	Vildbjerg Stadium	

=== Personnel ===
Team	Head coach	Captain	Ref
B.93	(Denmark) Rasmus Good	(Denmark) Nicoline “Nisse” Lieber Heilstrup	
ASA	(Denmark) Jack Hansen		
Dalum/Næsby	(Denmark) Niels Peter Jensby (Note: Niels Peter Jensby was appointed the head coach for Næsby BK's women's senior team on 1 January 2020, and continued as head coach for the superstructure created on 1 July 2021 at senior level between Næsby BK and Dalum IF.)		
Næstved HG	(Denmark) Steen "Olsen" Hansen (Note: Dennis Deleuran (Næstved BK men's U-19 head coach) acted as interim coach for the game against Sundby BK on 7 November 2021, as Steen "Olsen" Hansen was unable to attend the match.)	(Denmark) Katrine Krag-Andersen (Denmark) Karoline Ellegård	
OB Q	(Denmark) Bo Sundahl	(Denmark) Kamilla Ørskov Jensen	
Sundby	(Denmark) Lasse Lund Larsen	(Denmark) Pernille Mellergaard	
Varde	(Denmark) Kian Simon Røn	(Denmark) Marie Bruun	
Vildbjerg	(Denmark) Rasmus Hansen		

=== Managerial changes ===
Team	Outgoing coach	Manner of departure	Date of vacancy	Position in table	Incoming coach	Date of appointment	Ref
Næstved HG	(Denmark) Jeppe Tengbjerg	Sacked	16 September 2021	8th	(Denmark) Steen "Olsen" Hansen	17 September 2021	

== Regular season ==
=== League table ===
Pos	Team	Pld	W	D	L	GF	GA	GD	Pts	Qualification
1	OB Q	14	12	1	1	32	7	+25	37	Qualification play-offs
2	Sundby BK	14	7	2	5	25	18	+7	23	Qualification play-offs
3	B.93	14	6	4	4	16	9	+7	22	Qualification play-offs
4	Varde IF	14	7	1	6	28	23	+5	22	Qualification play-offs
5	ASA	14	5	3	6	14	19	−5	18	1st Division play-off round
6	Dalum/Næsby	14	4	3	7	13	23	−10	15	1st Division play-off round
7	Vildbjerg SF	14	3	3	8	11	29	−18	12	1st Division play-off round
8	Næstved HG	14	2	3	9	14	25	−11	9	1st Division play-off round

Rules for classification: 1) Points; 2) Goal difference; 3) Goals scored; 4) Head-to-head points; 5) Head-to-head goal difference; 6) Play-off (played on neutral ground if determining teams for different rounds or promotion/relegation spots)

=== Results ===
Home \ Away	ASA	B93	DAN	NHG	ODE	SUN	VAR	VIL
ASA	—	0–0	1–3	2–1	0–3	1–1	2–0	0–0
B.93	0–1	—	0–0	2–1	2–1	1–3	0–0	3–1
Dalum/Næsby	2–0	0–2	—	1–1	1–2	0–5	4–2	1–0
Næstved HG	1–3	0–0	3–0	—	1–1	2–1	2–4	2–3
OB Q	4–0	1–0	2–0	1–0	—	2–0	5–1	2–1
Sundby	0–2	1–0	3–1	3–0	0–2	—	3–2	3–0
Varde	2–1	0–2	2–0	3–0	0–2	4–1	—	5–0
Vildbjerg	2–1	0–4	0–0	1–0	1–4	1–1	1–3	—

Legend: Blue = home team win; Yellow = draw; Red = away team win.

== Qualification play-offs ==
=== League table ===
Pos	Team	Pld	W	D	L	GF	GA	GD	Pts	Qualification
1	Næstved HG	10	7	2	1	24	7	+17	23	2022–23 1st Division
2	Østerbro IF (P)	10	6	0	4	20	16	+4	18	2022–23 1st Division
3	Vildbjerg	10	4	2	4	18	18	0	14	2022–23 1st Division
4	Dalum/Næsby	10	4	1	5	17	20	−3	13	2022–23 1st Division
5	ASA (R)	10	3	1	6	13	16	−3	10	2022–23 2nd Division
6	JAI Fodbold	10	3	0	7	13	28	−15	9	2022–23 2nd Division

Rules for classification: 1) Points; 2) Goal difference; 3) Goals scored; 4) Head-to-head points; 5) Head-to-head goal difference; 6) Play-off (played on neutral ground if determining teams for different rounds or promotion/relegation spots)
(P) Promoted; (R) Relegated

=== Results ===
Home \ Away	ASA	DAN	JAI	NHG	VIL	ØST
ASA		2–1	2–0	0–2	1–2	0–1
Dalum/Næsby	3–1		0–2	2–5	3–3	1–2
JAI Fodbold	0–5	1–3		1–5	1–0	5–3
Næstved HG	0–0	3–0	3–1		1–1	4–1
Vildbjerg	4–1	1–3	3–2	0–1		3–2
Østerbro IF	3–1	0–1	4–0	1–0	3–1	

Legend: Blue = home team win; Yellow = draw; Red = away team win.

== Statistics ==
Only matches in the regular season are covered in the statistics

=== Top scorers ===
Rank	Player	Club	Goals
1	(Denmark) Sissel Bøje	Sundby	9
1	(Denmark) Kamilla Ørskov Jensen	OB Q	9
3	(Denmark) Michelle Lindhard Jørgensen	Varde	6
3	(Denmark) Pernille Mellergaard	Sundby	6
3	(Denmark) Line Aarhus	Varde	6
6	(Denmark) Jane Jeppesen	Varde	5
6	(Denmark) Sofie Lund Søderholm	Dalum/Næsby	5
8	(Denmark) Vilja Dahl	Vildbjerg	4
8	(Denmark) Solveig Enemark	Varde	4
8	(Denmark) Julie Moeslund	ASA	4
8	(Israel) Rachel Shtainshnaider	Næstved HG	4

==== Hat-tricks ====
Player	For	Against	Result	Goals	Date	Ref
(Denmark) Michelle Lindhard	Varde IF	Sundby BK	4–1 (H)	48', 79', 82'	2 October 2021	

=== Clean sheets ===
Rank	Player	Club	Clean sheets
1	(Sweden) Isabelle Granlund	OB Q	8
2	(Denmark) Katrine Ingeman Beck	ASA	4
2	(Uganda) Vanessa Karungi	B.93	4
2	(Denmark) Josephine Madsen	Sundby	4
2	(Denmark) Mie Moltrup	Dalum/Næsby	4
2	(Denmark) Sidse Tryk	Varde	4
7	(Denmark) Trine Gaur	Vildbjerg	2
7	(Denmark) Christina Kese	Næstved HG	2
7	(Denmark) Ida Tommerup	B.93	2
10	(Denmark) Marie Rosendahl Jakobsen	Vildbjerg	1
10	(Denmark) Cæcilie Lihn	ASA	1
10	(Denmark) Pernille Rudberg Rasmussen	B.93	1

=== Discipline ===
==== Player ====
- Most yellow cards: 3
  - (Denmark) Sissel Bøje (Sundby)
  - (Denmark) Line Grøndahl (Næstved HG)
  - (Denmark) Isabella Jeppesen (OB Q)
  - (Denmark) Cecilie Nielsen (Dalum/Næsby)
- Most red cards: 0

==== Club ====
- Most yellow cards: 12
  - Sundby
- Fewest yellow cards: 6
  - Varde
- Most red cards: 0
- Fewest red cards: 0
