= 2019–20 Danish Women's League =

Danish Women's League
- Season: 2019–20
- Dates: 3 August 2019–27 June 2020
- Champions: Fortuna Hjørring
- Relegated: Odense Q BSF
- Champions League (QR): Fortuna Hjørring; Brøndby
- Matches: 86
- Goals: 318 (3.7 per match)
- Best player: Nanna Christiansen
- Top goalscorer: Nicoline Sørensen (16 goals)
- Biggest home win: Brøndby 7–1 KoldingQ (21 September 2019)
- Biggest away win: Odense Q 1–7 Thy-Thisted (19 October 2019)
- Highest scoring: Fortuna Hjørring 8–5 Odense Q (21 September 2019)

The 2019–20 Danish Women's League (known as Gjensidige Kvindeligaen for sponsorship reasons) was the 48th season of the top-flight of the Danish Women's Football League. Brøndby IF were the defending champions and FC Nordsjælland made their debut in the league.

Fortuna Hjørring won their 11th league title, while Odense Q and BSF were relegated to the 1st Division.

== Format ==
The main round of the league is played in autumn as a double round-robin tournament between the 8 participating teams, where each team plays against each other both at home and away.

The six best placed teams qualify for spring championship play-offs. The finals consist once again of a double round-robin tournament among the six participating teams. The scores from the main league round carry over into the championship play-offs.

The two bottom ranked teams instead play in qualification play-offs, a double round-robin tournament with the top four teams of the 2019–20 Danish Women's 1st Division for two spots in 2020–21 Danish Women's League. The scores from the main league round are not carried over into the qualification play-offs.

== Teams ==
There are 8 teams competing in the regular season of the league: the 6 teams from the previous season's championship play-offs, and the top two teams from the previous season's qualification play-offs. The two teams promoted from the qualification play-offs were Odense Q, keeping their top tier spot, and FC Nordsjælland, winning promotion from the 1st Division, the latter replacing relegated team B.93.

=== Changes ===
▲ from 2018–19 1st Division	▼ to 2019–20 1st Division
Nordsjælland	B.93

=== Stadiums and locations ===
Location of the 2019–20 Danish League clubs.

Team	Location	Stadium	Capacity
Brøndby	Brøndby	Brøndby Stadium	29,000
BSF	Ballerup	Ballerup Sports Park Stadium	4,000
Fortuna Hjørring	Hjørring	Hjørring Stadium	7,500
KoldingQ	Kolding	Kolding Stadium (Note: Three matches played at Mosevej Sports Grounds)	10,000
Nordsjælland	Farum	Farum Park	10,300
Odense Q	Odense	Marienlyst Center (Note: One match played at Odense Athletics Stadium)	1,200
FC Thy-Thisted Q	Thisted	Sparekassen Thy Arena	3,000
VSK Aarhus	Aarhus	Vejlby Stadium (Note: One match was played at Aarhus Stadium)	5,200

=== Personnel and kits ===
Team	Manager	Captain	Kit	Shirt sponsor
Brøndby	(Denmark) Per Nielsen	(Denmark) Louise Lundsgaard	(Denmark) Hummel	(Denmark) Arbejdernes Landsbank
BSF	(Denmark) Kasper Klarskov	(Denmark) Michelle Madsen	(Spain) Joma	SuperBrugsen, Dystan Rosenberg, Ballerup Bladet
Fortuna Hjørring	(Denmark) Niclas Hougaard	(Denmark) Caroline Rask	(United States) New Balance	Sportmaster, Nord Energi
KoldingQ	(Denmark) Anders Jensen	(Denmark) Louise Eriksen	(United States) Nike, Inc.	A/S Bolind-Handel
Nordsjælland	(Denmark) Brian Sørensen	(Denmark) Catrine Gryholt	(United States) Nike, Inc.	Arbejdernes Landsbank, DHL
Odense Q	(Denmark) Bo Sundahl	(Denmark) Tenna Kappel	(Spain) Joma	(Denmark) Folkesparekassen
Thy-Thisted	(Denmark) Torben Overgaard	(Denmark) Matilde Kjeldgaard	(Germany) Adidas	Skyum, Intersport, Armiga A/S
VSK Aarhus	(Denmark) Anders Nim	(Denmark) Christina Ravn	(Germany) Puma	Bistorante Italia

=== Managerial changes ===
Team	Outgoing manager	Manner of departure	Date of vacancy	Position in the table	Incoming manager	Date of appointment
Odense Q	(Denmark) Morten Christiansen	Sacked	27 June 2019	Pre-season	(Denmark) Steen Hansen	1 July 2019
BSF	(Denmark) Peer Lisdorf	Sacked	3 October 2019	8th	(Denmark) Thomas Maale (interim)	3 October 2019
BSF	(Denmark) Thomas Maale (interim)	End of interim spell	1 January 2020	8th	(Denmark) Kasper Klarskov	11 November 2019
Fortuna Hjørring	(United States) Carrie Kveton	Signed by OL Reign	24 November 2019	1st	(Denmark) Niclas Hougaard	1 January 2020
VSK Aarhus	(Denmark) Hans Paarup	Resigned	27 November 2019	5th	(Denmark) Anders Nim	1 January 2019
KoldingQ	(Denmark) Peter Pedersen	Sacked	3 December 2019	6th	(Denmark) Anders Jensen	1 January 2020
Odense Q	(Denmark) Steen Hansen	Mutual consent	14 December 2019	7th	(Denmark) Bo Sundahl	14 December 2019

== Regular season ==
=== League table ===
Pos	Team	Pld	W	D	L	GF	GA	GD	Pts	Qualification
1	Fortuna Hjørring	14	9	3	2	38	17	+21	30	Championship play-offs
2	Brøndby IF	14	9	2	3	50	20	+30	29	Championship play-offs
3	Nordsjælland	14	8	2	4	29	14	+15	26	Championship play-offs
4	FC Thy-Thisted Q	14	5	6	3	34	28	+6	21	Championship play-offs
5	VSK Aarhus	14	6	3	5	25	21	+4	21	Championship play-offs
6	KoldingQ	14	4	3	7	14	30	−16	15	Championship play-offs
7	Odense Q	14	3	1	10	24	49	−25	10	Qualification play-offs
8	BSF	14	1	2	11	12	47	−35	5	Qualification play-offs

Source: Danish Football Association (in Danish)
Rules for classification: 1) Points; 2) Goal difference; 3) Goals scored; 4) Away goals scored; 5) Play-off (played on neutral ground if determining teams for different rounds); 6) Draw.

== Play-offs ==
=== Championship ===
Points are reset, but bonus points are awarded for the placement in the main round. 10 points for first place, 8 points for second place and then 6, 4, 2 and 0.

Pos	Team	Pld	W	D	L	GF	GA	GD	Pts	Qualification
1	Fortuna Hjørring (C)	5	4	1	0	9	2	+7	23	Champions League
2	Brøndby	5	4	1	0	8	2	+6	21	Champions League
3	FC Nordsjælland	5	2	0	3	6	7	−1	12	
4	FC Thy-Thisted Q	5	1	0	4	3	8	−5	7	
5	KoldingQ	5	2	0	3	5	4	+1	6	
6	VSK Aarhus	5	1	0	4	7	15	−8	5	

Source: Danish Football Association (in Danish)
Rules for classification: 1) Points; 2) Goal difference; 3) Goals scored; 4) Away goals scored; 5) Play-off (played on neutral ground if determining teams for different rounds); 6) Draw.
(C) Champions

=== Qualification ===
Pos	Team	Pld	W	D	L	GF	GA	GD	Pts	Qualification
1	HB Køge (P)	5	5	0	0	13	1	+12	15	2020–21 Danish Women's League
2	AaB (P)	5	4	0	1	12	6	+6	12	2020–21 Danish Women's League
3	Odense Q (R)	5	2	1	2	12	9	+3	7	2020–21 1st Division
4	B.93	5	2	0	3	8	10	−2	6	2020–21 1st Division
5	Vildbjerg SF	5	1	1	3	6	11	−5	4	2020–21 1st Division
6	BSF (R)	5	0	0	5	3	17	−14	0	2020–21 1st Division

Source: Danish Football Association (in Danish)
Rules for classification: 1) Points; 2) Goal difference; 3) Goals scored; 4) Away goals scored; 5) Play-off (played on neutral ground if determining teams for different rounds); 6) Draw.
(P) Promoted; (R) Relegated

== Season statistics ==
=== Top scorers ===
The regular season goals by the championship teams are added to the final tally.

==== Championship ====
Rank	Player	Club	Goals
1	(Denmark) Nicoline Sørensen	Brøndby	16
2	(Denmark) Nanna Christiansen	Brøndby	14
3	(Denmark) Caroline Møller	Fortuna Hjørring	13
4	(Finland) Sanni Franssi	Fortuna Hjørring	10
5	(Denmark) Rikke Dybdahl	Thy-Thisted	9
6	(Denmark) Sarah Dyrehauge	Thy-Thisted	8
7	(Denmark) Emma Snerle	Fortuna Hjørring	6
7	(Denmark) Olivia Holdt	VSK Aarhus	6
7	(Denmark) Josefine Hasbo	Brøndby IF	6
7	(Denmark) Janni Thomsen	VSK Aarhus	6

==== Regular season ====
Rank	Player	Club	Goals
1	(Denmark) Nicoline Sørensen	Brøndby	16
2	(Denmark) Caroline Møller	Fortuna Hjørring	12
3	(Denmark) Nanna Christiansen	Brøndby	11
4	(Denmark) Rikke Dybdahl	Thy-Thisted	9
4	(Finland) Sanni Franssi	Fortuna Hjørring	9
6	(Denmark) Camilla Kur Larsen	Nordsjælland	8
7	(Denmark) Tenna Kappel	Odense Q	7
7	(Denmark) Cecilie Fløe	Odense Q	7
9	(Denmark) Louise Lundsgaard	Brøndby	6
9	(Denmark) Malene Sørensen	Thy-Thisted	6

=== Clean sheets ===
Rank	Player	Club	Clean sheets
1	(Denmark) Kathrine Larsen	Nordsjælland	6
2	(United States) Kelsey Daugherty	Fortuna Hjørring	5
3	(Denmark) Katrine Abel	Brøndby	3
3	(Denmark) Maja Bay Østergaard	Thy-Thisted	3
3	(Denmark) Katrine Svane	VSK Aarhus	3
3	(Denmark) Freja Thisgaard	Fortuna Hjørring	3
7	(Denmark) Lene Christensen	KoldingQ	2
7	(Denmark) Sarah Jacobsen	Odense Q	2

== Awards ==
=== Player of the Month ===
Month	Player	Club
August	(Denmark) Nicoline Sørensen	Brøndby IF
September	(Denmark) Cecilie Fløe	Odense Q
October	(Denmark) Caroline Møller	Fortuna Hjørring
November	(Denmark) Emma Snerle	Fortuna Hjørring

=== Player of the Season ===
Player	Club	Ref.
(Denmark) Nanna Christiansen	Brøndby IF	

== Effects of the COVID-19 pandemic ==
On 6 March 2020, all sport in Denmark were locked down and banned during the coronavirus pandemic, until mid of April. In May, it was announced that the season would restart on 6 June and the remaining matches of the season would be played behind closed doors. The Championship round and the Qualification round, were reduced from a total of 10 matches to 5 matches, per team.

On 10 June 2020, it was decided to reopen stadiums for spectators, with up to 500 people.

== Broadcasting ==
In May 2020, the Danish Football Union announced that they had signed a TV-deal with Discovery, Inc., where a number of matches will be shown on Eurosport 2 and Sport Live, as well as the streaming service Dplay.
