= 2021–22 Danish Women's League =

Danish Women's League
- Season: 2021–22
- Dates: 6 August 2021 - 4 June 2022
- Champions: HB Køge; 2nd title
- Relegated: AaB
- Champions League (QR): HB Køge; Fortuna Hjørring
- Matches: 86
- Goals: 242 (2.81 per match)
- Best player: Kyra Carusa
- Top goalscorer: Rikke Dybdahl (16 goals)
- Biggest home win: Thy-Thisted Q 5–0 AaB (4 September 2021)
- Biggest away win: AaB 0–5 Fortuna Hjørring (30 October 2021); HB Køge 1–6 Fortuna Hjørring (18 April 2022)
- Highest scoring: 7 goals Four matches
- Longest unbeaten run: 24 matches HB Køge
- Longest winless run: 14 matches AaB
- Longest losing run: 12 matches AaB
- Only matches in the regular season and the championship play-offs are covered in the statistics

The 2021–22 Danish Women's League (known as Gjensidige Women's League for sponsorship reasons) was the 48th season of the top-flight of the Danish Women's Football League.

HB Køge were the defending champions after winning their first title in May 2021, and won for the second year in a row, this time in an unbeaten campaign.

== Teams ==
There are 8 teams competing in the regular season of the league: the 6 teams from the previous season's championship play-offs, and the top two teams from the previous season's qualification play-offs. The two teams promoted from the qualification play-offs were AGF and AaB, both keeping their top tier spot. Geographically, 5 teams represented Jutland (AGF, Fortuna Hjørring, KoldingQ, Thy-Thisted Q, and AaB) while 3 represented Zealand (Brøndby, HB Køge, and Nordsjælland).

=== Stadiums and locations ===
Location of clubs for the 2021–22 season

Team	Location	Stadium	Capacity
AGF	Aarhus	Vejlby Stadion	5,200
Brøndby IF	Brøndby	Brøndby Stadion	29,000
Fortuna Hjørring	Hjørring	Nord Energi Arena	7,500
HB Køge	Køge	Capelli Sport Stadion	4,000
Kolding IF	Kolding	Fynske Bank Arena	3,000
FC Nordsjælland	Farum	Farum Park	10,300
FC Thy-Thisted Q	Thisted	Sparekassen Thy Arena	3,000
AaB	Aalborg	Aalborg Portland Park	13,800

=== Personnel and kits ===
Team	Manager	Captain	Kit	Sponsor
AGF	(Denmark) Katrine S. Pedersen	(Denmark) Christina Ravn	(Denmark) Hummel	(Denmark) Arbejdernes Landsbank
Brøndby	(Denmark) Per Nielsen	(Denmark) Nanna Christiansen	(Denmark) Hummel	(Denmark) Arbejdernes Landsbank
Fortuna Hjørring	(Denmark) Brian Sørensen	(Romania) Florentina Olar	(United States) New Balance	(Russia) Sportmaster (Denmark) DS Gruppen A/S
HB Køge	(Denmark) Søren Randa-Boldt	(Denmark) Maria Uhre	(United States) Capelli Sport	(Denmark) Spar Nord Bank
Kolding IF	(Denmark) Anders Jensen	(Denmark) Louise Eriksen	(Germany) Adidas	(Denmark) Fynske Bank
FC Nordsjælland	(Canada) Carmelina Moscato	(United States) Jessica Davis	(United States) Nike, Inc.	(Germany) DHL
FC Thy-Thisted Q	(Denmark) Allan Drost	(Denmark) Matilde Kjeldgaard	(Germany) Adidas	(Denmark) Sparekassen Thy
AaB	(Denmark) Peter Pedersen	(Denmark) Line Andersen	(Denmark) Hummel	(Denmark) Sparekassen Vendsyssel

=== Managerial changes ===
Team	Outgoing manager	Manner of departure	Date of vacancy	Pos.	Incoming manager	Date of appointment
AGF	(Denmark) Anders Nim	Resigned	30 June 2021	Pre-season	(Denmark) Katrine S. Pedersen	1 July 2021
HB Køge	(Denmark) Peer Lisdorf	Resigned	30 June 2021	Pre-season	(Denmark) Søren Randa-Boldt	1 July 2021
FC Nordsjælland	(Denmark) Brian Sørensen	Signed by Fortuna Hjørring	30 June 2021	Pre-season	(Canada) Carmelina Moscato	12 July 2021
Fortuna Hjørring	(Sweden) Elena Sadiku (interim)	End of interim spell	30 June 2021	Pre-season	(Denmark) Brian Sørensen	29 April 2021
AaB	(Denmark) Claus Larsen	Sacked	23 November 2021		(Denmark) Peter Pedersen	5 January 2022

== Regular season ==
=== League table ===
Pos	Team	Pld	W	D	L	GF	GA	GD	Pts	Qualification
1	HB Køge	14	12	2	0	29	6	+23	38	Championship play-offs
2	Fortuna Hjørring	14	10	3	1	37	14	+23	33	Championship play-offs
3	Brøndby IF	14	8	1	5	29	23	+6	25	Championship play-offs
4	FC Thy-Thisted Q	14	6	2	6	26	25	+1	20	Championship play-offs
5	Kolding IF	14	5	2	7	15	21	−6	17	Championship play-offs
6	FC Nordsjælland	14	4	4	6	11	14	−3	16	Championship play-offs
7	AGF	14	2	2	10	14	31	−17	8	Promotion play-offs
8	AaB	14	0	2	12	7	34	−27	2	Promotion play-offs

Source: Dansk Boldspil Union
Rules for classification: 1) Points; 2) Goal difference; 3) Number of goals scored; 4) Head-to-head points; 5) Head-to-head goal difference; 6) Head-to-head away goals scored

=== Results ===
Home \ Away	AGF	BRØ	HJØ	KØG	KOL	NOR	THI	AAB
AGF		1–4	2–5	0–2	2–1	0–1	2–3	2–2
Brøndby IF	2–2		0–3	0–1	5–1	2–1	5–2	5–2
Fortuna Hjørring	3–0	4–1		2–2	0–0	2–0	2–1	3–0
HB Køge	2–0	2–0	4–0		4–2	1–0	3–1	1–0
Kolding IF	2–1	0–1	0–2	0–1		1–0	0–1	2–1
FC Nordsjælland	3–1	0–1	2–2	0–0	1–1		1–3	1–0
FC Thy-Thisted Q	1–0	3–1	2–4	1–3	2–3	0–0		5–0
AaB	0–1	1–2	0–5	0–3	0–2	0–1	1–1	

Source: Danish Football Association
Legend: Blue = home team win; Yellow = draw; Red = away team win.

== Play-offs ==
=== Championship ===
Goals and points were transferred from the regular season in full and the combined points total is displayed in the table.

Pos	Team	Pld	W	D	L	GF	GA	GD	Pts	Qualification
1	HB Køge (C)	10	8	2	0	29	9	+20	64	Champions League QR
2	Fortuna Hjørring	10	6	1	3	20	13	+7	52	Champions League QR
3	Brøndby IF	10	1	3	6	11	20	−9	31	
4	FC Nordsjælland	10	3	4	3	14	10	+4	29	
5	FC Thy-Thisted Q	10	2	2	6	12	27	−15	28	
6	KoldingQ	10	2	4	4	9	16	−7	27	

Source: Dansk Boldspil Union
Rules for classification: 1) Points; 2) Goal difference; 3) Number of goals scored; 4) Head-to-head points; 5) Head-to-head goal difference; 6) Head-to-head away goals scored
(C) Champions

==== Results ====
Home \ Away	BRØ	HJØ	KØG	KOL	NOR	THI
Brøndby IF		0–2	0–3	0–0	1–1	1–2
Fortuna Hjørring	4–1		1–6	2–0	2–0	4–0
HB Køge	3–2	1–0		3–1	1–1	5–2
Kolding Q	0–3	1–1	0–3		2–2	1–1
FC Nordsjælland	1–1	4–0	0–2	0–1		2–0
FC Thy-Thisted Q	4–2	0–4	2–2	1–3	0–3	

Source: Danish Football Association
Legend: Blue = home team win; Yellow = draw; Red = away team win.

=== Promotion ===
Pos	Team	Pld	W	D	L	GF	GA	GD	Pts	Qualification
1	AGF	10	7	3	0	24	5	+19	24	2022–23 Women's League
2	Sundby (P)	10	7	1	2	27	13	+14	22	2022–23 Women's League
3	B.93	10	6	3	1	16	7	+9	21	2022–23 1st Division
4	AaB (R)	10	3	1	6	14	19	−5	10	2022–23 1st Division
5	Varde IF	10	2	0	8	4	26	−22	6	2022–23 1st Division
6	OdenseQ	10	0	2	8	4	19	−15	2	2022–23 1st Division

Source: Danish Football Association (in Danish)
Rules for classification: 1) Points; 2) Goal difference; 3) Number of goals scored; 4) Head-to-head points; 5) Head-to-head goal difference; 6) Head-to-head away goals scored
(P) Promoted; (R) Relegated

==== Results ====
Home \ Away	AGF	B93	ODE	SUN	VAR	AAB
AGF		0–0	2–0	2–2	2–0	2–0
B.93	1–1		2–1	3–0	1–0	3–2
OdenseQ	0–5	0–0		1–4	0–1	1–2
Sundby	1–3	2–1	2–1		5–0	4–0
Varde IF	1–6	0–1	1–0	0–4		1–5
AaB	0–1	1–4	0–0	2–3	2–0	

Source: Danish Football Association (in Danish)
Legend: Blue = home team win; Yellow = draw; Red = away team win.

== Season statistics ==
The statistics cover the regular season and the championship play-offs.

=== Top scorers ===
Rank	Player	Club	Goals
1	(Denmark) Rikke Dybdahl	Thy-Thisted Q	16
2	(Denmark) Cecilie Fløe	HB Køge	14
3	(Denmark) Emma Snerle	Fortuna Hjørring	13
4	(United States) Maddie Pokorny	HB Køge	11
4	(Denmark) Olivia Holdt	Fortuna Hjørring	11
4	(Denmark) Nanna Christiansen	Brøndby IF	11
7	(Denmark) Malou Marcetto	Brøndby IF	9
8	(United States) Kyra Carusa	HB Køge	8
9	(Denmark) Cornelia Kramer	HB Køge	7
9	(Romania) Florentina Olar	Fortuna Hjørring	7
9	(Denmark) Malene Sørensen	Thy-Thisted Q	7

=== Hat-tricks ===
Player	For	Against	Result	Date
(Denmark) Emma Snerle	Fortuna Hjørring	AGF	5–2 (A)	7 August 2021
(Denmark) Malene Sørensen	Thy-Thisted Q	AaB	5–0 (H)	4 September 2021
(Denmark) Rikke Dybdahl	Thy-Thisted Q	Brøndby	3–1 (H)	26 September 2021
(Denmark) Olivia Holdt	Fortuna Hjørring	AaB	5–0 (A)	30 October 2021
(Denmark) Cecilie Fløe	HB Køge	KoldingQ	3–0 (A)	20 May 2022

=== Clean sheets ===
Rank	Player	Club	Clean sheets
1	(United States) Kaylan Marckese	HB Køge	14
2	(United States) Adelaide Gay	Fortuna Hjørring	7
2	(United States) Carly Nelson	Nordsjælland	7
4	(Denmark) Line Geltzer Johansen	Fortuna Hjørring	5
5	(Denmark) Maja Bay Østergaard	Thy-Thisted	4
6	(Germany) Ann-Kathrin Dilfer	Brøndby	3
7	(Denmark) Stina Lykke Borg	KoldingQ	2
7	(Denmark) Sofie Grøn	KoldingQ	2
9	(Denmark) Naja Bahrenscheer	Brøndby	1
9	(Denmark) Lene Christensen (Note: Christensen left halfway through the season to join Norwegian club Rosenborg.)	KoldingQ	1
9	(Denmark) Anna Kaas	Nordsjælland	1
9	(Denmark) Katrine Svane	AGF	1

== Awards ==
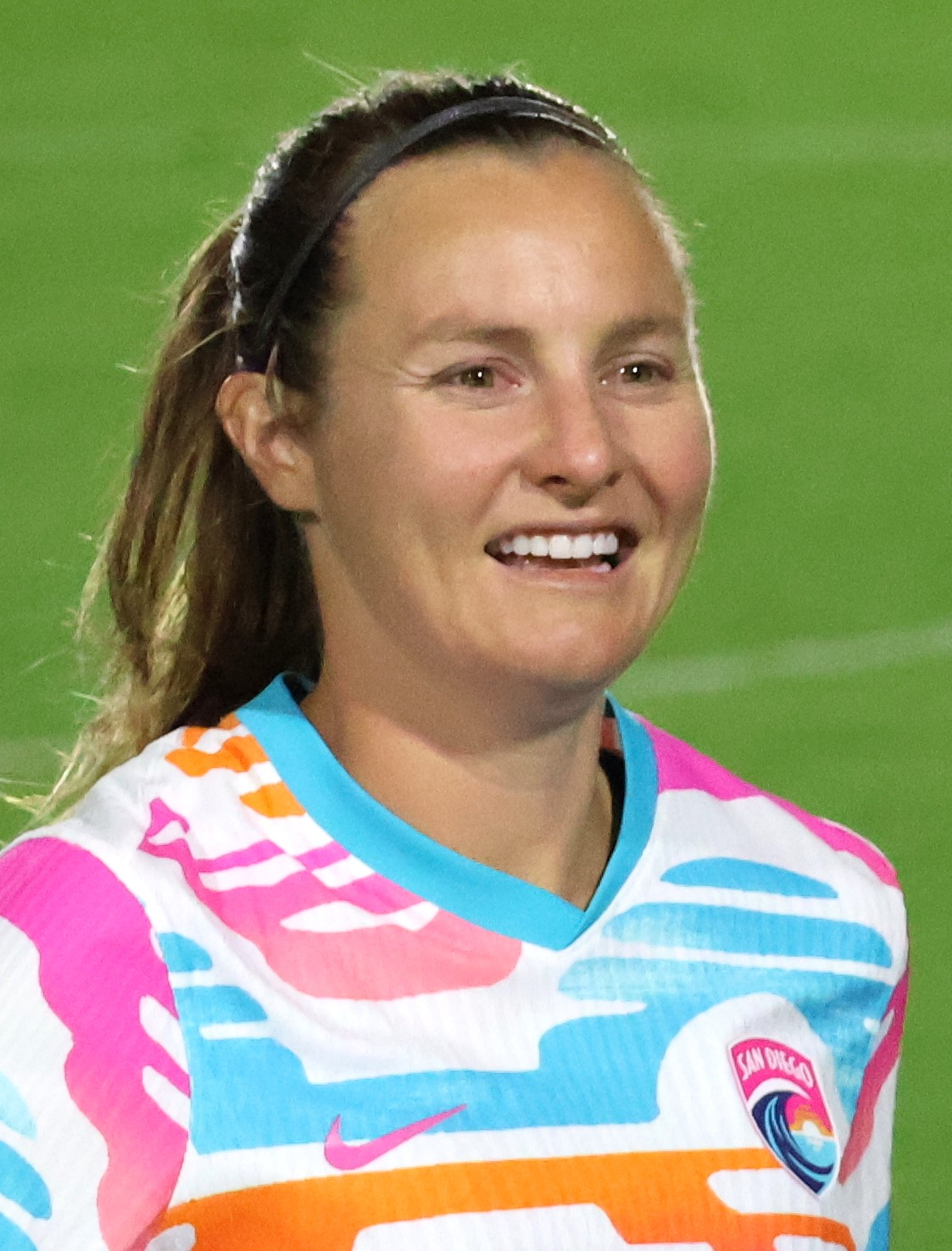
American HB Køge forward Kyra Carusa was named the league's Player of the Year. Carusa also won Player of the Month in April 2022 and contributed 8 goals for her team.

=== Player of the Month ===
Month	Player	Club	Ref.
August	(Denmark) Emma Snerle	Fortuna Hjørring	
September	(Denmark) Kathrine Møller Kühl	FC Nordsjælland	
October	(Denmark) Cecilie Fløe	HB Køge	
November	(Denmark) Dajan Hashemi	FC Nordsjælland	
April	(United States) Kyra Carusa	HB Køge	

=== Player of the Autumn ===
Player	Club	Ref.
(Denmark) Emma Snerle	Fortuna Hjørring	

=== Player of the Year ===
Player	Club	Ref.
(United States) Kyra Carusa	HB Køge	

== See also ==
- 2021–22 Danish Women's 1st Division
- 2021–22 Danish Women's 2nd Division
- 2021–22 Danish Women's Cup
- 2021–22 UEFA Women's Champions League
