= 2021–22 Danish Women's 2nd Division =

Danish 2nd Division
- Season: 2021–22
- Dates: 14 August – 13 November 2021 (Preliminary round); 2 April – 11 June 2022 (1st Division play-off round); 2 April – 11 June 2022 (2nd Division play-off round); June 2022 (Championship final)
- Top goalscorer: Julie Kjer Offersen (18 goals)
- All statistics correct as of 1 January 2022.

The 2021–22 Danish Women's 2nd Division was the first season of the third tier of the Danish Women's Football League.

Governed by the Danish FA, the season was launched on 14 August 2021 with two fixtures in the preliminary round (Ballerup-Skovlunde Fodbold vs Østerbro IF and Solrød FC vs Fremad Amager) and concluded with the last five matches on 13 November 2021. Østerbro IF, Solrød FC, Ballerup-Skovlunde Fodbold, Fredensborg BI, FC Damsø, JAI Fodbold, IF Lyseng (AGF II), Aarhus 1900, Aalborg Freja and Fortuna Hjørring (II) entered as relegated teams from last season's second division, while Allerød FK, Fremad Amager, KoldingQ and Vejle BK entered as promoted teams from the last season's third-tier. The eleven first teams, excluding the reserve teams, in the division entered the 2021–22 Danish Women's Cup in the cup tournament's first round proper. The fixtures for the 2021–22 season were announced by the Danish FA's tournament committee and featured a twenty weeks long winter break.

Fortuna Hjørring withdrew their reserve team from the third division shortly before the start of the season. In September 2021, it was announced that KoldingQ would merge and become the new women's department of Kolding IF, which occurred at the end of October 2021. Østerbro IF finished on top of their group following the conclusion of the preliminary round, qualifying for a spot in the 1st Division play-off round against the lowest placed teams of the Danish Women's 1st Division, while JAI Fodbold qualified as the second best team in their group, after Kolding IF (reserves) in first place, due to reserve teams being ineligible for promotion.

== Summary ==
The 2021–22 season was inaugurated on Saturday 14 August with two fixtures in the preliminary first round of the east group; Ballerup-Skovlunde Fodbold (BSF) and Østerbro IF, both teams relegated from the second division last season, played at Ballerup Idrætspark, and Solrød FC against BK Fremad Amager, one relegated team from the second-tier versus one promoted team from the Kvindeserien from last season, played at the football ground at Solrød Idrætscenter. Ballerup-Skovlunde Fodbold's Sille Kristine Lønstrup scored the first goal of the season, and the new nation-wide third division, in the 6th minute by outplaying the Østerbro IF's goalkeeper. Tanya Arngrimsen netted the second and third goal for Ballerup-Skovlunde in the 34th and 66th minutes, while Anne-Sophie Winther Svartstein of Østerbro IF scored the only goal for the away team after 48 minutes of play following a corner kick by Østerbro IF's Pernille Larsen, hence Ballerup-Skovlunde Fodbold secured a victory in the first match. The first round match between Fredensborg BI and FC Damsø at Fredensborg Stadium got postponed to 15 September.

The first two matches of the west group was set for Sunday 15 August 2021, and featured Aarhus 1900 against IF Lyseng at Langenæs Idrætsanlæg (aka Fort Langelæs), both relegated from the second division last season, and the reserve team of KoldingQ versus Aalborg Freja at the artificial field on Fynske Bank Arena (aka KoldingQ's stadium). The first round match between Vejle BK and the reserve team of Fortuna Hjørring was cancelled. Fortuna Hjørring withdrew their reserve team from the third division shortly before the start of the season, citing economic difficulties having the same number of players on contracts due to the COVID-19 pandemic in Denmark and last minutes reductions to the roster, and was penalized with a DKK 3,000 fine by the Football Disciplinary Board of the Danish FA for having brought discredit to the league tournament and football in general. All of the scheduled league matches for Fortuna Hjørring were expunged from the calendar, reducing the number of teams in group 2 to six.

FC Damsø were compelled to cancel their away match against Østerbro IF on 21 August 2021 at Fælledparken, citing problems fielding a competitive first team for the match and with both goalkeepers being unable to played, which resulted in a DKK 1,500 fine and given a 3–0 loss by the Football Disciplinary Board. The main stadium ground at Vanløse Idrætspark was converted from grass to an artificial turf between 31 May and mid-September 2021, and FC Damsø had their home matches in the match calendar arranged to take place in later rounds, with the inaugural women's league match at the new stadium taking place on 18 September against Allerød FK. In September 2021, it was announced that KoldingQ would merge and become the women's department of Kolding IF Fodbold with KoldingQ's top-flight team becoming part of the professional branch and the reserve team being attached to the mother club of Kolding IF Fodbold, which occurred at the end of October 2021 – the first third division match under the Kolding IF Women banner was played on 31 October 2021 at the ground in Bramdrupdam.

At the conclusion of the preliminary rounds in the fall season, Østerbro IF had finished on top of their group, which qualified the club for a spot in the 1st Division play-off round against the bottom half of the 2021–22 Danish Women's 1st Division, while JAI Fodbold qualified as the second best team in their group. The reserves of Kolding IF finished in the top spot in the west group, but were not eligible to partake in the promotion play-off round. The largest victory in the preliminary rounds happened matchday 10, when Østerbro IF secured a 11–1 away win against BK Fremad Amager on 16 October at the artificial field next to the stadium at Sundby Idrætspark, with two players scoring hat-tricks.

== Teams ==
14 teams competed in the league: the 10 teams relegated from the 2020–21 1st Division and the 4 teams promoted from the 2020–21 Denmark Series. The four teams promoted from the Denmark Series were Allerød FK, Fremad Amager and the Kolding IF reserve team, who all entered the league for the first time in their respective clubs' histories, while Vejle B returned to the league following a two-year absence. The ten teams relegated from the 1st Division were Østerbro IF, Solrød FC, Ballerup-Skovlunde Fodbold, Fredensborg, Damsø, JAI Fodbold, IF Lyseng (AGF reserves), Aarhus 1900, Aalborg Freja and Fortuna Hjørring II, all of which ended their spells in the second-tier of seven, one, one, one, eleven, two, five, three, one and four years respectively.

=== Stadiums and locations ===
Locations of the 2021–22 Women's 2nd Division teams outside the Copenhagen area.
Locations of the 2021–22 Women's 2nd Division teams in the Copenhagen area.

Club	Location	Stadium	Turf	Ref
Allerød FK	Lillerød	Allerød Idrætspark	Natural	
Ballerup-Skovlunde Fodbold	Ballerup	Ballerup Idrætspark (Note: The last two home games of Ballerup-Skovlunde Fodbold on 30 October against Solrød FC and 13 November against Damsø were played at the artificial field at the south end of the sports complex.)	Natural	
Damsø	Vanløse	Vanløse Idrætspark (Note: The stadium of Vanløse Idrætspark was converted from natural grass to an artificial field in June–September 2021. The inaugural women's league match at the new field was played on 18 September against Allerød FK.)	Artificial	
Fortuna Hjørring II (Note: Fortuna Hjørring withdrew their reserve team from the league shortly before the start of the season.)	Hjørring	Landlyst Idrætsanlæg	Natural	.
IF Lyseng	Højbjerg	Lyseng Idrætspark	Natural	
Fremad Amager	Amager	Kunstgræsbanen, Sundby Idrætspark (Note: BK Fremad Amager's first match of the season on 21 August 2021 against Ballerup-Skovlunde Fodbold was played inside the football and athletics stadium with an artificial turf.)	Artificial	
Fredensborg	Fredensborg	Fredensborg Stadium	Natural	
JAI Fodbold	Viby	Viby Idrætspark	Natural	
Kolding IF II (Note: KoldingQ was merged into Kolding IF in late October 2021, playing their first match under the Kolding IF Women banner on 31 October 2021.)	Kolding	Kunstgræsbanen, Fynske Bank Arena	Artificial	
Solrød FC	Solrød	Solrød Idrætscenter	Natural	
Vejle B	Vejle	VB Parken (Note: The last match of the fall season on 6 November 2021 against Aalborg Freja was played at the newest artificial turf of VB Parken placed on the north side of the building.)	Natural	
Østerbro IF	Østerbro	Kunstgræsbanen, Fælledparken	Artificial	
Aalborg Freja	Aalborg	Frejaparken (Note: IK Aalborg Freja's final last home game at Frejaparken against Aarhus 1900 on 13 November 2021 was played at the artificial field north of the regular home ground.)	Natural	
Aarhus 1900	Aarhus	Langenæs Idrætsanlæg (Note: Three home games, the last of the fall season, were played at the sports facility of Frederiksbjerg's artificial turf, namely the matches against JAI Fodbold (24 October), Vejle BK (31 October) and Kolding IF (7 November).); Kunstgræsbanen, Frederiksbjerg Idrætsanlæg	Natural; Artificial	

=== Personnel ===
Team	Head coach	Captain	Ref
Allerød FK	(Denmark) Muhammed Keskin	...	
Ballerup-Skovlunde Fodbold	(Denmark) Torben Frost Clausen (Note: BSF signed Per Agerholm as replacement for Torben Frost Clausen ahead of the 16 October game against Fredensborg. Mikkel Bjerregaard Årosin was appointed the new head coach effective 1 January 2022.) (Denmark) Per Agerholm (Denmark) Mikkel Bjerregaard Årosin	...	
Damsø	(Denmark) Christina "Stina" Jensen	...	
IF Lyseng	(Denmark) Thomas Koudal (Note: Thomas Koudal was replaced by Kenneth Pedersen as first team coach around the start of the season. Following Kenneth Pedersen's resignation on 31 December 2021, Nicklas Albech was appointed as the new head coach for Fredensborg.) (Denmark) Kenneth Pedersen (Denmark) Niklas Albech	...	
BK Fremad Amager	(Denmark) Christina Balleby (Note: The coaching duo of Christina Balleby and Kim Petersen shared the role and responsibilities of head and assistant coach evenly during the season.) (Denmark) Kim Petersen	...	
Fredensborg	(Denmark) Martin Krüger (Note: Assistant coach Kjeld Samuelsen was presented as the new head coach for Fredensborg BK&IF on 7 September 2021, replacing Martin Krüger, who remained in the club as sports director for the women's department.) (Denmark) Kjeld Samuelsen	...	
JAI Fodbold	(Denmark) Brian Jensen	(Denmark) Anne Luff Bennetsen	
Kolding IF (II)	(Denmark) Jan-Erik Simmelhag (Note: Jesper Adsersen signed as the new head coach for the reserve team of Kolding IF on 1 January 2022, replacing Jan-Erik Simmelhag.) (Denmark) Jesper Adsersen	...	
Solrød FC	(Denmark) Rasmus Skovby (Note: Rasmus Skovby took over as head coach on 1 January 2022 for the remaining part of the season following resignation of Jens Niklas Martin Berglid (July 2018 until 31 December 2021).) (Sweden) Jens Niklas Martin Berglid	...	
Vejle BK	(Denmark) Søren Peter Hansen (Note: Søren Peter Hansen resigned his position as head coach effective from 31 December 2021. Jørgen "Tand" Sørensen took over as head coach on 1 January 2022.) (Denmark) Jørgen "Tand" Sørensen	...	
Østerbro IF	(Denmark) Michael Mejdahl Andersen	...	
Aalborg Freja	(Denmark) Allan Valsted Jørgensen	...	
Aarhus 1900	(Denmark) Sune Friis Christensen	...	

=== Coaching changes ===
Team	Outgoing coach	Manner of departure	Date of vacancy	Position in table	Incoming coach	Date of appointment	Ref
IF Lyseng	(Denmark) Thomas Koudal	?	? 2021	?	(Denmark) Kenneth Pedersen	? 2021	
Aalborg Freja	(Denmark) Kim Johannesen	Mutual consent	21 July 2021	Preseason	(Denmark) Allan Valsted Jørgensen	22 July 2021	
Fredensborg	(Denmark) Martin Krüger	Mutual consent	6 September 2021	3rd (east)	(Denmark) Kjeld Samuelsen	7 September 2021	...
Ballerup-Skovlunde Fodbold	(Denmark) Torben Frost Clausen	Sacked	12 October 2021	1st (east)	(Denmark) Per Agerholm	13 October 2021	
Solrød FC	(Denmark) Rasmus Skovby	Resigned	31 December 2021	3rd (east)	(Sweden) Jens Niklas Martin Berglid	1 January 2022	
Vejle BK	(Denmark) Søren Peter Hansen	Resigned	31 December 2021	6td (west)	(Denmark) Jørgen "Tand" Sørensen	1 January 2022	
Ballerup-Skovlunde Fodbold	(Denmark) Per Agerholm	Mutual content	31 December 2021	2nd (east)	(Denmark) Mikkel Bjerregaard Årosin	1 January 2022	
Kolding IF (II)	(Denmark) Jan-Erik Simmelhag	Mutual content	31 December 2021	1st (west)	(Denmark) Jesper Adsersen	1 January 2022	
IF Lyseng	(Denmark) Kenneth Pedersen	Resigned	31 December 2021	4th (west)	(Denmark) Niklas Albech	1 January 2022	

== Group 1 (East) ==
=== Regular season ===
Pos	Team	Pld	W	D	L	GF	GA	GD	Pts	Qualification
1	Østerbro	12	8	2	2	46	12	+34	26	1st Division play-offs
2	BSF	12	8	2	2	23	9	+14	26	2nd Division play-offs
3	Solrød FC	12	7	3	2	39	7	+32	24	2nd Division play-offs
4	Damsø	12	4	2	6	14	18	−4	14	2nd Division play-offs
5	Fredensborg BI	12	4	2	6	18	32	−14	14	2nd Division play-offs
6	Allerød FK	12	3	3	6	12	27	−15	12	2nd Division play-offs
7	Fremad Amager	12	0	2	10	12	59	−47	2	2nd Division play-offs

Rules for classification: 1) Points; 2) Goal difference; 3) Goals scored; 4) Head-to-head points; 5) Head-to-head goal difference; 6) Play-off (played on neutral ground if determining teams for different rounds or promotion/relegation spots)

==== Results ====
Home \ Away	AFK	BSF	DAM	FBI	FRA	SOL	ØST
Allerød FK	—	0–1	0–2	2–2	5–1	0–5	0–6
BSF	0–0	—	2–0	3–1	6–0	0–0	3–1
Damsø	0–3	2–0	—	2–2	4–1	0–2	0–1
Fredensborg BI	1–2	2–1	1–0	—	5–2	0–6	0–3
Fremad Amager	0–0	1–3	2–2	3–4	—	0–4	1–11
Solrød FC	4–0	0–1	1–2	7–0	6–0	—	3–3
Østerbro IF	5–0	2–3	3–0^{‡}	1–0	9–1	1–1	—

Legend: Blue = home team win; Yellow = draw; Red = away team win.

^{‡}: FC Damsø were compelled to cancel their away match against Østerbro IF on 21 August 2021 and was penalized with a 3–0 loss.

=== Play-offs ===
Pos	Team	Pld	W	D	L	GF	GA	GD	Pts	Qualification or relegation
1	Solrød FC	10	8	1	1	35	8	+27	29	Final
2	BSF	10	6	2	2	34	11	+23	25	
3	Damsø	10	5	1	4	18	11	+7	19	
4	Fredensborg BI	10	3	3	4	20	17	+3	14	
5	Allerød FK	10	4	1	5	19	19	0	14	2022–23 Denmark Series
6	Fremad Amager	10	0	0	10	2	62	−60	0	2022–23 Denmark Series

Rules for classification: 1) Points; 2) Goal difference; 3) Goals scored; 4) Head-to-head points; 5) Head-to-head goal difference; 6) Play-off (played on neutral ground if determining teams for different rounds or promotion/relegation spots)

==== Results ====
Home \ Away	AFK	BSF	DAM	FBI	FRA	SOL
Allerød FK	—					
BSF		—				
Damsø			—			
Fredensborg BI				—		
Fremad Amager					—	
Solrød FC						—

Legend: Blue = home team win; Yellow = draw; Red = away team win.

== Group 2 (West) ==
=== Regular season ===
Pos	Team	Pld	W	D	L	GF	GA	GD	Pts	Qualification
1	Kolding IF (II) (Note: KoldingQ was merged into Kolding IF in late October 2021, playing their first match under the Kolding IF Women banner on 31 October 2021. Reserve teams are ineligible for promotion.)	10	6	1	3	29	15	+14	19	Qualification for the 2nd Division play-off round
2	JAI Fodbold	10	6	0	4	21	16	+5	18	Qualification for the 1st Division play-off round
3	Aarhus 1900	10	5	1	4	15	16	−1	16	Qualification for the 2nd Division play-off round
4	IF Lyseng (AGF II) (Note: Reserve teams are ineligible for promotion.)	10	5	1	4	17	23	−6	16	Qualification for the 2nd Division play-off round
5	Aalborg Freja	10	4	2	4	18	18	0	14	Qualification for the 2nd Division play-off round
6	Vejle BK	10	1	1	8	10	22	−12	4	Qualification for the 2nd Division play-off round
7	Fortuna Hjørring (II)	0	0	0	0	0	0	0	0	Withdrew from league (Note: Fortuna Hjørring withdrew their reserve team from the league shortly before the start of the season.)

Rules for classification: 1) Points; 2) Goal difference; 3) Goals scored; 4) Head-to-head points; 5) Head-to-head goal difference; 6) Play-off (played on neutral ground if determining teams for different rounds or promotion/relegation spots)

==== Results ====
Home \ Away	FOR	JAI	KIF	IFL	AAF	A19	VBK
Fortuna Hjørring (II)	—	—	—	—	—	—	—
JAI Fodbold	—	—	2–4	2–3	5–0	2–0	3–2
Kolding IF (II)	—	2–3^{‡}	—	3–4	1–1	6–0	4–0^{‡}
IF Lyseng (AGF II)	—	1–0	1–2	—	3–1	2–2	1–0
Aalborg Freja	—	1–2	2–1	6–1	—	1–0	3–3
Aarhus 1900	—	3–1	0–2^{‡}	6–1	1–0	—	2–1
Vejle BK	—	0–1	2–4	1–0	1–3	0–1	—

Legend: Blue = home team win; Yellow = draw; Red = away team win.

^{‡}: KoldingQ was merged into Kolding IF in late October 2021, playing their last three league matches of the fall season under the Kolding IF Women banner.

=== Play-offs ===
Pos	Team	Pld	W	D	L	GF	GA	GD	Pts	Qualification or relegation
1	Kolding IF (II)	0	0	0	0	0	0	0	0	Qualification to championship final
2	Aarhus 1900	0	0	0	0	0	0	0	0	
3	IF Lyseng (AGF II)	0	0	0	0	0	0	0	0	
4	Aalborg Freja	0	0	0	0	0	0	0	0	
5	Vejle BK	0	0	0	0	0	0	0	0	Relegation to Danish Women's Series

Updated to match(es) played on 1 January 2022. Source:
Rules for classification: 1) Points; 2) Goal difference; 3) Goals scored; 4) Head-to-head points; 5) Head-to-head goal difference; 6) Play-off (played on neutral ground if determining teams for different rounds or promotion/relegation spots)

==== Results ====
Home \ Away	KIF	IFL	AAF	A19	VBK
Kolding IF (II)	—				
IF Lyseng (AGF II)		—			
Aalborg Freja			—		
Aarhus 1900				—	
Vejle BK					—

Updated to match(es) played on 1 January 2022. Source:
Legend: Blue = home team win; Yellow = draw; Red = away team win.

== Final ==
After the conclusion of the 2nd Division play-off rounds of the tournament, the winners of the two groups partake in a final to determine the overall winner of the third-tier. In even years, the rules stipulate that the final is played the home ground of the west group winner, while the east group winner get the home advantage in odd years. If the match ends in a draw, the match will be decided in accordance with the rules for the final of the Danish Women's Cup.

== Statistics ==
=== Scoring ===
==== Group 1 (east) top scorers ====
As of 1 January 2022

Rank	Player	Club	Goals
1	(Denmark) Julie Kjer Offersen	Østerbro IF	18
2	(Denmark) Ika Elisabeth Ejstrup Nimb	Solrød FC	10
3	(Denmark) Kathrine Arleth Dencker	Solrød FC	6
3	(Denmark) Carina Wegener Hansen	Allerød FK	6
3	(Denmark) Sille Kristine Lønstrup	Ballerup-Skovlunde Fodbold	6
3	(Denmark) Anne-Sophie Winther Svartstein	Østerbro IF	6
3	(Denmark) Emma Frederikke Jørgensen	Fredensborg BI	6
3	(Denmark) Maria Jacobsen	Solrød FC	6
8	(Denmark) Ida Maria Ahlers Hove	Solrød FC	5
8	(Denmark) Kimmie Christensen	BK Fremad Amager	5
8	(Denmark) Sara Dorthea Nielsen	Østerbro IF	5

==== Group 2 (west) top scorers ====
As of 1 January 2022

Rank	Player	Club	Goals
1	(Denmark) Katrine Overlund Sørensen	Aarhus 1900	11
2	(Denmark) Sif Rykær	Kolding IF	7
3	(Denmark) Lotte Haaning	Aalborg Freja	5
3	(Denmark) Caroline Borch	Kolding IF	5
3	(Denmark) Marika Skov	JAI Fodbold	5
6	(Denmark) Lotte Birk Svendsen	IF Lyseng	4
6	(Denmark) Karen Buhl	JAI Fodbold	4
6	(Denmark) Sidsel Dam Lomborg	JAI Fodbold	4
6	(Denmark) Ditte Langberg	Kolding IF	4
6	(Denmark) Asgerdur Palsdottir	Aalborg Freja	4

==== Hat-tricks ====
As of 1 January 2022

Player	For	Against	Result	Goals	Date	Ref
(Denmark) Ika Elisabeth Ejstrup Nimb	Solrød FC	BK Fremad Amager	6–0 (H)	42', 78', 83'	14 August 2021	
(Denmark) Katrine Overlund Sørensen^{5}	Aarhus 1900	IF Lyseng	6–1 (H)	23', 35', 38', 44', 88'	15 August 2021	
(Denmark) Carina Wegener Hansen^{4}	Allerød FK	BK Fremad Amager	5–1 (H)	12', 56', 60', 66'	28 August 2021	
(Denmark) Caroline Borch	Kolding IF	Aarhus 1900	6–0 (H)	50', 70', 83'	5 September 2021	
(Denmark) Sif Rykær	Kolding IF	JAI Fodbold	4–2 (A)	46', 62', 74'	11 September 2021	
(Denmark) Julie Kjer Offersen	Østerbro IF	Allerød FK	6–0 (A)	11', 90', 90'	11 September 2021	
(Denmark) Ika Elisabeth Ejstrup Nimb	Solrød FC	Fredensborg BI	6–0 (A)	14', 28', 79'	18 September 2021	
(Denmark) Sofie Broch-Lips	Østerbro IF	BK Fremad Amager	9–1 (H)	13', 68', 71'	18 September 2021	
(Denmark) Sofie Broch-Lips	Østerbro IF	Fredensborg BI	3–0 (A)	46', 54', 76'	26 September 2021	
(Denmark) Emilie Stolzenbach	Ballerup-Skovlunde Fodbold	BK Fremad Amager	6–0 (H)	30', 44', 63'	2 October 2021	
(Denmark) Marika Skov	JAI Fodbold	Aalborg Freja	5–0 (H)	43', 83', 90'	2 October 2021	
(Denmark) Sara Dorthea Nielsen	Østerbro IF	BK Fremad Amager	11–1 (A)	20', 25', 37'	16 October 2021	
(Denmark) Julie Kjer Offersen	Østerbro IF	BK Fremad Amager	11–1 (A)	44', 56', 90'	16 October 2021	
(Denmark) Julia Naomi Mortensen	IF Lyseng	JAI Fodbold	3–2 (A)	8', 45', 90'	16 October 2021	
(Denmark) Maria Jacobsen	Solrød FC	Fredensborg BI	7–0 (H)	55', 55', 85'	6 November 2021	

- ^{4} Player scored 4 goals
- ^{5} Player scored 5 goals

=== Clean sheets ===
As of 1 January 2022

Rank	Player	Club	Clean sheets	Refs
1	(Denmark) Signe H. Munk	Solrød FC	8	
2	(Denmark) Amanda Brunholt	Ballerup-Skovlunde Fodbold	6	
3	(Denmark) Josephine Moll Thayssen	Østerbro IF	4	
4	(Denmark) Frieda Ravnskjær Jensen	Kolding IF	3	
4	(Denmark) Julie Kristine Pedersen	Allerød FK	3	
6	(Denmark) Malou Kjær Christensen	JAI Fodbold	2	
6	(Denmark) Emma Bay Agerskov	IF Lyseng	2	
6	(Denmark) Thea Roque-Krag	FC Damsø	2	
6	(Denmark) Mette Justesen	Aarhus 1900	2	
10	(Denmark) Therese Olesen	Fredensborg BI	1	
10	(Denmark) Pernille Cruddis	BK Fremad Amager	1	
10	(Denmark) Thea Ebbe Brich	Østerbro IF	1	
10	(Denmark) Vibeke Juhl Jensen	Vejle BK	1	
10	(Denmark) Rikke Hansen	JAI Fodbold	1	
10	(Denmark) Emilie Nørgaard Kappers	Aalborg Freja	1	
