= Laura Worsøe =

Danish footballer (born 2001)

Personal information
- Full name: Laura Frederikke Worsøe Nielsen
- Date of birth: 28 October 2001 (age 25)
- Place of birth: Odense, Denmark
- Height: 1.61 m (5 ft 3 in)
- Position: Goalkeeper

Team information
- Current team: OB Q
- Number: 1

Youth career
- 2013–2018: Odense Q

Senior career*
| Years | Team | Apps | (Gls) |
| 2018–2022 | Odense Q | 49 | (0) |
| 2022 | Sundby Boldklub | 13 | (0) |
| 2023–2025 | Kolding IF | | |
| 2023 | → IFK Kalmar (loan) | | |
| 2025– | OB Q | | |

International career^{‡}
| 2016–2017 | Denmark U16 | 6 | (0) |
| 2017–2018 | Denmark U17 | 6 | (0) |
| 2018–2020 | Denmark U19 | 4 | (0) |
| 2022– | Denmark | 2 | (0) |
- * Club domestic league appearances and goals ‡ National team caps and goals as of 21 February 2023

Laura Frederikke Worsøe Nielsen (born 28 October 2001) is a Danish footballer who plays as a goalkeeper for A-Liga club OB Q and the Denmark national team.

== Club career ==
Worsøe was born in Odense. Since 10 September 2018, she has appeared for Odense Q as both a league and 1st division team. In the 2021–22 season, she won the basic game with the club in the 1st Division, but did not win the qualification series and thus did not advance to the Gjensidige Kvindeliga.

== International career ==
Worsøe has appeared several times for the Danish youth national teams and participated in the 2018 Under-19 European Championship in Switzerland at just 16 years old.

In May 2022, she was selected for the senior national team for the first time, for an official friendly match against Austria in Wiener Neustadt. She was substituted after the break in the 46th minute, as a replacement for Katrine Svane. Here she kept a clean sheet until the final whistle in Denmark's 2–1 victory.

Subsequently, on 16 June of the same year, she was selected for national coach Lars Søndergaard's squad for the 2022 European Championship in England.
