= Fabiana Alcalà =

Personal information
- Full name: Fabiana Alcalà Pertegaz
- Date of birth: 16 May 1997 (age 29)
- Place of birth: Las Palmas, Spain

Team information
- Current team: Copenhagen

Managerial career
- Years: Team
- 2024: Akademisk Boldklub
- 2026–: Copenhagen

Fabiana Alcalà Pertegaz is a Spanish football coach who is the interim head coach of Danish A-Liga club Copenhagen. Alcalà has worked with both men's and women's clubs, including TMF Kuwait academy and Akademisk Boldklub, as well as RCD Espanyol Femení academy and her current position.

== Coaching career ==
Alcalà started her coaching career with RCD Espanyol Femení academy, where she worked from 2019 to 2023. She then joined Akademisk Boldklub (AB) in January 2024 as the Fitness Coach and became the first woman to serve as a head coach in the Danish men's divisions with two matches in May 2024. Alcalà was with AB until July 2025, where she joined Copenhagen as the Assistant Coach.

Alcalà took over as interim head coach in August 2026, following head coach Klarskov's sacking after three consecutive losses. After 4 losses in the first 4 matches under Alcalà, Copenhagen won its first match in the league 3–1 against Brøndby in the first ever A-Liga New Firm derby.

Alcalà holds a bachelor's degree in Sports Management and an master's degree in Sports Sciences. She is currently getting her UEFA Pro Licence.
