= Tenna Kappel =

Danish footballer

Personal information
- Full name: Tenna Kappel Johansen
- Date of birth: 20 March 1992 (age 34)
- Place of birth: Denmark
- Height: 1.70 m (5 ft 7 in)
- Position: Midfielder

Senior career*
Years	Team	Apps	(Gls)
2008–2010	Team Viborg		
2010	IK Skovbakken		
2011–2014	Vildbjerg SF		
2014–2021	Odense Q	114	(41)

International career
2007	Denmark U16	2	(2)
2007–2008	Denmark U17	10	(6)
2009–2011	Denmark U19	14	(3)
2015	Denmark U23	1	(0)
2014–2015	Denmark	5	(0)
- * Club domestic league appearances and goals

Tenna Kappel Johansen (née Bendtsen; born 20 March 1992), known as Tenna Kappel, is a Danish former footballer who played as a midfielder. She appeared for the Denmark women's national team and captained A-Liga club Odense Q until her player retirement in 2021.

== International career ==
Kappel capped for Denmark at senior level during two Algarve Cup editions (2014 and 2015).
