= Emilie Henriksen =

Danish footballer (born 1997)

Personal information
- Full name: Emilie Lærke Henriksen
- Date of birth: 15 March 1997 (age 29)
- Place of birth: Vejle, Denmark
- Height: 1.68 m (5 ft 6 in)
- Position: Midfielder

Team information
- Current team: OB Q
- Number: 3

Senior career*
Years	Team	Apps	(Gls)
2012–2014	Vejle B	32	
2014–2016	OB		
2017–2019	Brøndby		
2020–2021	Växjö		
2022–2024	MSV Duisburg		
2024–	OB Q		

International career^{‡}
2012–2013	Denmark U16	12	(0)
2012–2013	Denmark U17	10	(4)
2014–2016	Denmark U19	28	(4)
2016–2019	Denmark U23	4	(1)
2019	Denmark	2	(0)
- * Club domestic league appearances and goals as of 23:18, 27 July 2026 (UTC) ‡ National team caps and goals as of 23:18, 27 July 2026 (UTC)

Emilie Lærke Henriksen (born 15 March 1997) is a Danish footballer who plays as a midfielder for Odense Boldklub Q.
