= Nalongo Hadijah =

Ugandan footballer

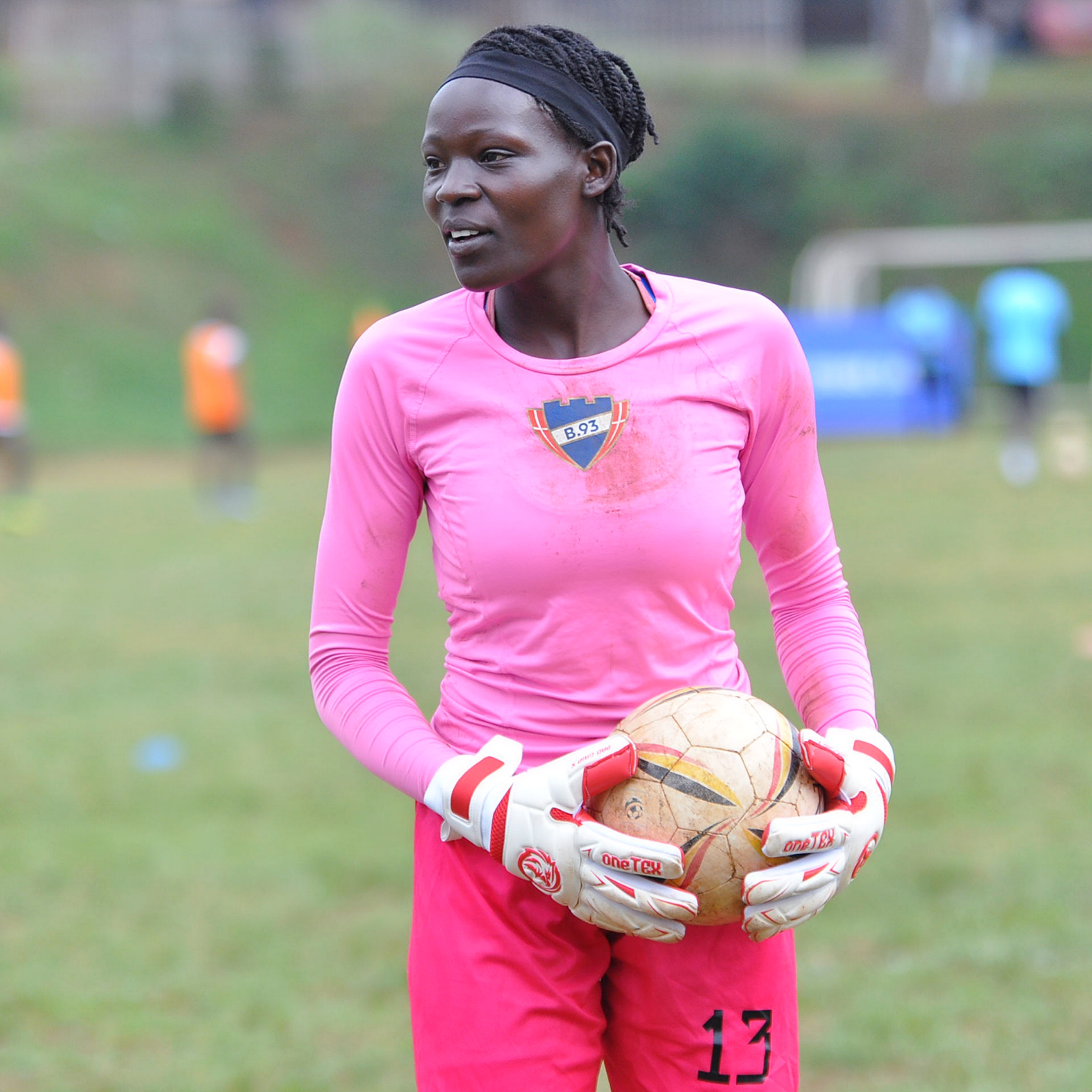

Personal information
- Full name: Nalongo Hadijah
- Date of birth: 26 December 2000 (age 25)
- Place of birth: Nakaloke-Mbale
- Height: 1.75 m (5 ft 9 in)
- Position: Goalkeeper

Team information
- Current team: She Corporate FC
- Number: 13

Nalongo Hadijah (born 26 December 2000) is a Ugandan footballer who plays as a goalkeeper for the She Corporate FC in the FUFA Women Super League.

== Career choice ==
Nalongo Hadijah is quoted as saying:

"My parents didn’t love the game of soccer, and they really didn’t believe that even girls have the potential to play football," Nalongo shared. Her father, in particular, was strict about her leaving home for training. However, her brother, Seku Rajabu, who also played football, became a crucial influence and inspiration, paving the way for her soccer journey.

== Educational Background ==
Hadijah Nalongo began her education at Nakaloke Primary School in Mbale District, where she completed her Primary Leaving Examination (PLE) in 2013. She then attended Nakaloke Secondary School in 2014 before transferring to Highway Secondary School in Sironko District, where she studied from 2015 to 2016. In 2017, she moved to St. Noa Girls Secondary School on Zzana-Entebbe Road, where she earned her Uganda Certificate of Education (UCE) and Uganda Advanced Certificate of Education (UACE) in 2017 and 2019, respectively.

== Football journey ==
Hadijah Nalongo, initially played netball before discovering her passion for football in 2015. Her journey into football began when she noticed Namaganda Zaituna, a player for Kampala Queens FC, passing by her home each morning on her way to training. Intrigued, Nalongo stopped Zaituna one day and asked if she could join her. Zaituna, supportive of the idea, spoke to her coach, Bulolo Shaban, who welcomed Nalongo to the team.

Though initially a netball player at Nakaloke Secondary School, Nalongo believed her skills in catching balls could translate to goalkeeping. After being informed about the possibility of a scholarship, she convinced her parents and quickly earned a full sports scholarship from Highway Secondary School in Sironko.

During the USSSA ball games in Masindi in 2016, Nalongo’s talent attracted interest from multiple schools, and she chose St. Noa Girls Secondary School in Zzana to continue her education and football career. After graduating, she played for Uganda Christian University (UCU) for two seasons before joining She Corporate FC in 2024, marking a new chapter in her professional career.

== Achievements ==
YEAR	CATEGORY	AWARD
2023	Education	Diploma in Business Administration
2023	National Team (Football)	National Team Summons
2021	World University Games	Golden Gloves

In 2023, she was named the Best Goalkeeper at the World University Games in Yekaterinburg, Russia, where her exceptional performances between the posts earned her the Golden Gloves. Later, in 2024, Nalongo was again recognized as the Best Goalkeeper in the Uganda Women’s Cup.

== Club career ==
YEAR	CLUBS
2015-2016	Highway Secondary School (Sironko)
2017-2019	St Noa Girls Secondary School
2020-2023	UCU Lady Cardinals
2024-to-date	She Corporate FC

== International career ==
In 2023, Hadijah was named Best Goalkeeper and received the Golden Gloves at the World University Games held in Yekaterinburg, Russia. Additionally, Nalongo earned a call-up to the Uganda Women’s National Team (Crested Cranes) for international friendlies against Morocco in 2024.
