= Aarhus Idrætsforening af 1900 =

Danish sports club

Århus 1900
- Full name: Aarhus Idrætsforening af 1900
- Founded: 1900
- Ground: Aarhus Sports Park (complex); Marselisborghallen (indoor complex); Århus

Aarhus Idrætsforening af 1900 commonly known as Århus 1900 is a Danish sports club from Århus in Denmark. It has sections for athletics, badminton, orienteering, swimming, triathlon, tennis, volley and football.

The club is one of Denmark's biggest, and a number of athletes has participated in the Summer Olympic Games, World Championships and European Athletics Championships.

Most famous is perhaps shot putter Joachim Olsen, but also Christina Scherwin and Renata Nielsen has represented the club.

The club's long-time rival is AGF-Athletics

The club arranges the annual track and field event, Århus Games
