= Asii Berthelsen =

Danish footballer (born 2004)

Personal information
- Full name: Asii Arnarulunnguaq Kleist Berthelsen
- Date of birth: 26 January 2004 (age 22)
- Place of birth: Greenland, Denmark
- Position: Striker

Team information
- Current team: Copenhagen
- Number: 13

Senior career*
Years	Team	Apps	(Gls)
2018–2019	GSS	8	(40)
2019–2024	Fortuna Hjørring	35	(0)
2022-2023	→ Sundby BK (loan)	12	(0)
2025	B.93		
2025–	Copenhagen		

International career^{‡}
2019–2020	Denmark U-16	5	(0)
2021-2023	Denmark U-19	24	(3)
- * Club domestic league appearances and goals as of 22 August 2023 ‡ National team caps and goals as of 23:35, 29 August 2026 (UTC)

Asii Arnarulunnguaq Kleist Berthelsen (born 26 January 2004) is a Greenlandic footballer who plays as a forward for A-Liga club Copenhagen. Born in Greenland, she has played for the Denmark youth teams.

== Club career ==
In 2018 and 2019, Berthelsen won the Greenland Football Championship with GSS Nuuk. In both years she was top scorer of the tournament. She scored a hat trick in the 2018 finale at only 14 years old.

In 2020, Berthelsen signed for Danish top flight side Fortuna Hjørring. In the same year, she was named Greenland Sportsperson of the year by the Greenland Sports Association.

In 2021, Berthelsen became the first Greenlandic player to appear in the UEFA Champions League, playing as a substitute against FC Barcelona in a round of 16 match.

In 2022, she was loaned to Sundby in Denmark, before coming back to Fortuna Hjørring in 2023.

After a spell of injury, she travelled around the world, taking some time of her football career while recovering.

Berthelsen signed with Copenhagen club B.93 in spring 2025, where she scored in her debut and started every match. In 2025, after one season with B.93 in which they were relegated, Berthelsen signed with Copenhagen as a forward. In her first season with the club she helped the team win promotion to the A-Liga, the top division in Denmark.

== International career ==
Berthelsen has 13 appearances for the Denmark U-19 team. She scored two goals against Turkey in October 2021.
