= Sofie Vendelbo =

Danish footballer (born 2000)

Personal information
- Full name: Sofie Vendelbo Laursen
- Date of birth: 9 February 2000 (age 26)
- Place of birth: Silkeborg, Denmark
- Height: 1.73 m (5 ft 8 in)
- Position: Defender

Team information
- Current team: FC Midtjylland
- Number: 4

Senior career*
Years	Team	Apps	(Gls)
2019	Vildbjerg SF	10	(0)
2019–2020	VSK	19	(0)
2020–2022	AGF	61	(0)
2023	Genk		
2023–2024	1. FC Köln	13	(0)
2024–2026	AGF	28	(0)
2026–	FC Midtjylland		

International career^{‡}
2026–	Denmark	1	(0)
- * Club domestic league appearances and goals as of 16 September 2025 ‡ National team caps and goals as of 10 October 2026

Sofie Vendelbo Laursen (born 9 February 2000) is a Danish professional footballer who plays as a defender for A-Liga club FC Midtjylland and the Denmark national team. Vendelbo previously played for AGF, Frauen-Bundesliga club 1. FC Köln, and Belgian Women's Super League club Genk.

== International career ==
Vendelbo made her debut for the Denmark national team on 9 October 2026 in a 1–1 draw against Canada.
