= Vanessa Karungi =

Ugandan footballer (born 1999)

Personal information
- Full name: Vanessa Edith Karungi
- Date of birth: 8 November 1999 (age 26)
- Position: Goalkeeper

Team information
- Current team: Brøndby
- Number: 21

Youth career
- 2016–2018: She Corporate FC

Senior career*
Years	Team	Apps	(Gls)
2018–2021	She Corporate FC		
2021–2023	B.93		
2023–2026	Nordsjælland		
2026–	Brøndby		
- * Club domestic league appearances and goals as of 13 August 2025

Vanessa Edith Karungi (born 8 November 1999) is a Ugandan footballer who plays as a goalkeeper for Danish A-Liga club Brøndby.

== Early life ==
Born to Mr. Francis Byamukama and Mrs. Retired Major Betty Akello Otekat, Karungi is the eldest child in the family with two other siblings.

Karungi got her elementary education at Kyebambe Girls Primary school in Fort Portal district where she also sat for her Primary Leaving Examinations(PLE). From there, she joined Kyebambe Girls Secondary School before shifting to St.Mary’s Kitende and later on Kakungulu Memorial where she sat for Uganda Certificate of Education(UCE).

Karungi started her football career at Olila High School while in Advanced level(A'level) .

== Career ==
Karungi was awarded 2017 Uganda Sports Press Association Female Footballer of the Year.

She played as a goalkeeper for She Corporate FC in Uganda from 2016 to 2018

== Style of play ==
Karungi has been described as "famed for her penalty saving prowess".

== Personal life ==
Karungi has two siblings.
