= Signe Baattrup =

Danish footballer (born 2000)

Personal information
- Full name: Signe Hansen Baattrup
- Date of birth: 5 March 2000 (age 26)
- Place of birth: Silkeborg, Denmark
- Height: 1.62 m (5 ft 4 in)
- Position: Midfielder

Team information
- Current team: FC Midtjylland
- Number: 8

Youth career
- 2003–2014: Mariehøj IF

Senior career*
Years	Team	Apps	(Gls)
2017–2021	KoldingQ	77	(12)
2022–2023	Fortuna Hjørring	58	(0)
2024–2026	AGF	20	(3)
2026–	Midtjylland		

International career^{‡}
2015–2016	Denmark U16	5	(1)
2016–2017	Denmark U17	2	(0)
2018	Denmark U19	2	(0)
2023–2025	Denmark U23	5	(1)
- * Club domestic league appearances and goals ‡ National team caps and goals as of 15 May 2026

Signe Hansen Baattrup (born 5 March 2000) is a Danish association footballer who plays as a midfielder for A-Liga club FC Midtjylland. She has represented Denmark at under-16, under-17, under-19 and under-23 level.

Baattrup began playing football with Mariehøj IF before joining KoldingQ in 2017. She spent four seasons with the club before moving to Fortuna Hjørring in January 2022. In January 2024, she joined AGF, initially signing a two-year contract. In March 2025, she extended her contract with AGF through the end of 2026.

== Club career ==
=== KoldingQ ===
Baattrup joined KoldingQ in 2017 at the age of 17 after playing youth football at Mariehøj IF. She made her senior debut for the club in the Elitedivisionen, the top level of women's football in Denmark at the time. During her four seasons with KoldingQ, she made 77 league appearances and scored 12 goals.

KoldingQ reached the final of the Danish Women's Cup in 2018, where the club lost to Brøndby IF, giving Baattrup a runners-up medal.

=== Fortuna Hjørring ===
In January 2022, Baattrup transferred to Fortuna Hjørring. She became a regular member of the Fortuna first team before leaving for AGF in January 2024.

=== AGF ===
Baattrup joined AGF in January 2024 from Fortuna Hjørring. AGF described her as an attacking-minded midfielder and noted her experience in the Danish top division.

She scored her first goal for AGF in a 5–3 league defeat against Fortuna Hjørring on 4 May 2024.

In March 2025, AGF announced that Baattrup had signed a contract extension keeping her at the club through the end of 2026. The club described her as an established profile in the Danish top division and a key member of its midfield.

== International career ==
Baattrup has represented Denmark at several youth levels. She played for the Denmark under-16 team, followed by the under-17 and under-19 teams. She later represented Denmark at under-23 level.

== Honours ==
=== KoldingQ ===
- Danish Cup
  - Runners-up: 2018
