= Århus Games =

Århus Games is an athletics competition held in Århus, Denmark. A small number of athletes are invited, both national and international names (about 110 athletes in 20 disciplines).

The first time the games were held, in 1971, 6 Danish records were set. In 1972, the Belgian middle-distance runner Emiel Puttemans set his world record in the 3000 metres.

Since the competition started in 19, 28 Olympic champions have participated, either ruling, previous or upcoming. One world record, three regional records (Scandinavian), and 28 Danish records have been set at the Games
