= Ashley Riefner =

American soccer player

Personal information
- Full name: Ashley Lynn Riefner
- Date of birth: November 30, 1993 (age 32)
- Height: 1.65 m (5 ft 5 in)
- Position: Midfielder

Team information
- Current team: Fortuna Hjørring
- Number: 25

College career
Years	Team	Apps	(Gls)
2012–2015	Richmond Spiders	73	(13)

Senior career*
Years	Team	Apps	(Gls)
2016–2018	PK-35	55	(13)
2019	HJK Helsinki	19	(5)
2020	Åland United	13	(2)
2021–2022	Nordsjælland	32	(4)
2022–	Fortuna Hjørring	108	
- * Club domestic league appearances and goals

Ashley Riefner is an American professional soccer player who plays as a forward for A-Liga club Fortuna Hjørring.
