= Rachel Steinschneider =

Israeli footballer

Rachel Steinschneider רחל שטיינשניידר
Personal information
- Date of birth: 10 February 1994 (age 32)
- Place of birth: Beit Shemesh, Israel
- Position: Forward

Team information
- Current team: Hapoel Katamon Jerusalem

Senior career*
Years	Team	Apps	(Gls)
2013–2014	Maccabi Tzur Shalom	18	(9)
2015	Maccabi Kishronot Hadera	27	(13)
2015–2017	Hapoel Ironi Petah Tikva	32	(15)
2017–2018	ASA Tel Aviv	21	(12)
2018–2019	Kiryat Gat	22	(8)
2019–2021	Bnot Netanya	30	(14)
2021–2022	Næstved HG	21	(12)
2022	Yzeure	14	(6)
2022–	Hapoel Katamon Jerusalem	31	(6)

International career^{‡}
2019–	Israel	39	(3)
- * Club domestic league appearances and goals as of 26 November 2023 ‡ National team caps and goals as of 18 June 2026

Rachel Steinschneider (Hebrew: רחל שטיינשניידר; born 10 February 1994), also known as Rahel Shtainshnaider, is an Israeli footballer who plays as a forward for Israeli club Hapoel Katamon Jerusalem and the Israel women's national team.

== Club career ==
Steinschneider has played for Maccabi Tzur Shalom FC, Maccabi Kishronot Hadera FC, Hapoel Ironi Petah Tikva FC, ASA Tel Aviv, FC Kiryat Gat and Bnot Netanya FC in Israel.

She finished best scorer of Danish Women League.

On 30 January 2022, she joined the French women's football club Football féminin Yzeure Allier Auvergne.

In May 2022, she played in the Final of the Women's French Cup.

In August 2022, Steinschneider returned to Israel, signing with Hapoel Katamon Jerusalem.

== International career ==
Steinschneider has been capped for the Israel national team, appearing for the team during the 2023 FIFA Women's World Cup qualifying cycle.

== International goals ==
No.	Date	Venue	Opponent	Score	Result	Competition
1.	7 April 2023	Alcufer Stadion, Győr, Hungary	Hungary	1–0	1–3	Friendly

== Honors ==
- Finalist of the French Women Cup 2022
