= She Corporate FC =

Ugandan women's association football club

- Full name: She Corporate Football Club
- Nickname: The Sharks
- Ground: Jinja, Uganda
- Manager: Pande Saddam Cifu
- League: FUFA Women Super League
- 2025/26: FUFA Women Elite League champions (promoted)

She Corporate FC is a Ugandan professional women football team competing in the FUFA Women Super League.

== History ==
She Corporate FC and Kawempe Muslim Ladies FC were the only two clubs out of the eight that played the inaugural league in 2015.

They emerged as champions of the FUFA Women Elite League, defeating Olila High School WFC in a penalty shootout (6-5) after a goalless final. Their strong season performance included 12 wins, one draw, and one loss, earning them promotion to the FUFA Women Super League after being relegated the previous year. The club secured the 2024 FUFA Women's Cup by defeating Rines SS WFC, also in a penalty shootout (5-4). These accomplishments underline their resurgence in Ugandan women's football.

== Achievements ==
She Corporate Football Club won the 2021 - 2022 FUFA Women Super League which they won on the final day of the season, their players Phiona Nabbumba won the MVP while Daphine Nyayenga won the best goalkeeper.

She Corporate FC won the 2023/24 FUFA Women Elite League in which they defeated Olila High School WFC in the final that took place at Standard High School Zzana, Ndejje campus.

== Player ==
=== Current squad ===
As of 24 November 2024 She Corporate FC squad 2024/25.

Note: Flags indicate national team as defined under FIFA eligibility rules; some limited exceptions apply. Players may hold more than one non-FIFA nationality.

No.	Pos.	Nation	Player
1	GK	UGA	Nabitaka Molly
2	DF	UGA	Nakato Aminah
3	DF	UGA	Musibika Stella
4	MF	UGA	Namirimu Margret
5	MF	UGA	Anomo Barbra
6	MF	UGA	Akuuku Peninah
7	MF	UGA	Zalwango Sheeba
8	FW	UGA	Nakyeyune Leticia
9	FW	UGA	Jesca Namanda
10	FW	UGA	Nakacwa Ronah
11	FW	UGA	Nantege Ronah
12	DF	UGA	Arinda Anitah
13	GK	UGA	Nalongo Hadijah
14	DF	UGA	Adweru Barbara
15	DF	UGA	Kantono Mary

No.	Pos.	Nation	Player
16	MF	UGA	Nakate Cissy
17	FW	UGA	Nandhego Rebecca
18	FW	UGA	Nantongo Cissy
