= Milla-Maj Majasaari =

Finnish footballer (born 1999)

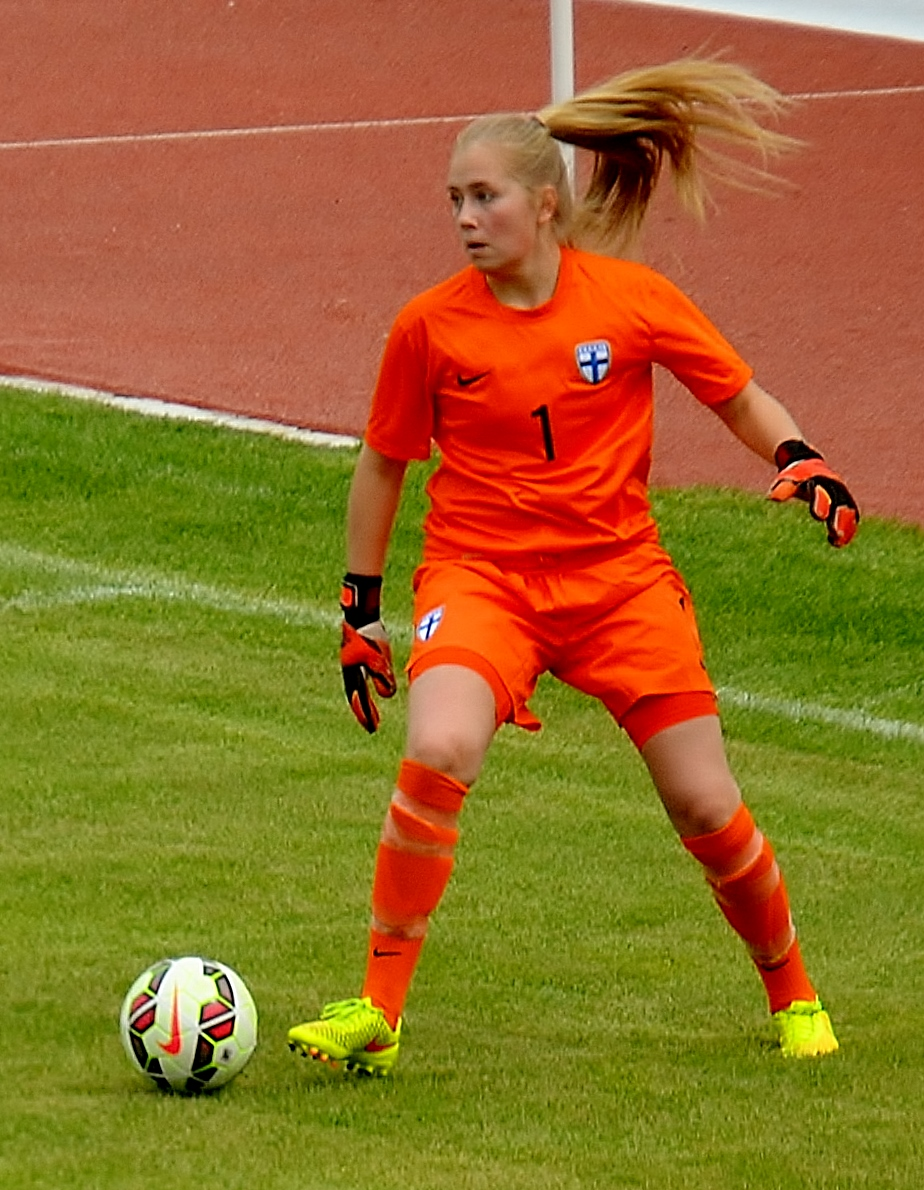
- Majasaari with Finland U17 in 2015

Personal information
- Date of birth: 15 October 1999 (age 27)
- Place of birth: Pori, Finland
- Height: 1.75 m (5 ft 9 in)
- Position: Goalkeeper

Team information
- Current team: Midtjylland
- Number: 77

Senior career*
Years	Team	Apps	(Gls)
2014–2015	NiceFutis	19	(0)
2016–2018	TPS	34	(0)
2019	Honka	16	(0)
2020–2022	AIK	60	(0)
2023	IK Uppsala	26	(0)
2024	Anderlecht	15	(0)
2024–2025	Crystal Palace	3	(0)
2025	Røa		
2026	Fortuna Hjørring		
2026–	Midtjylland		

International career^{‡}
2020–	Finland	1	(0)
- * Club domestic league appearances and goals as of 6 August 2026 ‡ National team caps and goals as of 3 January 2024

Milla-Maj Majasaari (Finnish: [ˈmilːɑˌmɑj ˈmɑjɑˌsɑːri]; born 15 October 1999) is a Finnish football goalkeeper who plays for A-Liga side Midtjylland and the Finland national team.

Majasaari has previously played for A-Liga club Fortuna Hjørring, Toppserien club Røa, then-Women's Super League side Crystal Palace, Belgian Women's Super League club Anderlecht, Damallsvenskan sides IK Uppsala and AIK, and Kansallinen Liiga clubs NiceFutis, TPS and FC Honka.

== Club career ==
Majasaari started her career at NiceFutis in Pori. She played her first Naisten Liga match with NiceFutis at the age of 14 in the Autumn of 2014. From 2016 to 2018, Majasaari played in TPS, which won the 2016 Naisten Liga silver. For the 2019 season, Majasaari moved to FC Honka, which placed second in the Naisten Liga during that season.

In December 2019, Majasaari signed a contract with AIK, who played in the Sweden second tier division Elitettan. In her first Swedish season, Majasaari played full minutes in all AIK matches and had 13 clean sheets. She was chosen as the best goalkeeper of the Elitettan season. The season ended with a victory for AIK and a promotion to Damallsvenskan. In November 2020, she signed a three-year extension with AIK. She played her first league match in Damallsvenskan on 17 April 2021.

On 5 January 2023, Majasaari was announced at IK Uppsala. On 14 May 2023, she kept a clean sheet and saved a penalty against IFK Kalmar.

After a one-year stint with fellow Damallsvenskan side IK Uppsala, Majasaari joined Belgian giants Anderlecht on 3 January 2024.

On 31 August 2024, Majasaari was announced at Crystal Palace in the Women's Super League. She debuted in the WSL on 26 January, in a match against Tottenham Hotspur.

== International career ==
Majasaari has represented Finland in the U-16, U-17, U-18 and U-19 teams and in the women's U-23 national team. She played her first international match at the age of 14 on the U-16 national team against Iceland in the summer of 2014. Majasaari participated in the Euro 2022 qualifier against Scotland for the first time in October 2020 with the Finnish national team, in which she was called to replace the injured Paula Myllyoja.

Majasaari was part of the Finland squad that won the 2023 Cyprus Women's Cup for the first time.

Majasaari was part of the Finland squad that won the 2024 Pinatar Cup.

== Career statistics ==
As of 10 July 2025

Appearances and goals by club, season and competition
Club	Season	League			Cup (Note: Includes Finnish Women's Cup and Svenska Cupen (women))		League cup (Note: Includes FA Women's League Cup)		Total	
Club	Season	Division	Apps	Goals	Apps	Goals	Apps	Goals	Apps	Goals
NiceFutis	2014	Naisten Liiga	6	0	–		–		6	0
NiceFutis	2015	Naisten Liiga	13	0	–		–		13	0
NiceFutis	Total		19	0	0	0	0	0	19	0
TPS	2016	Naisten Liiga	1	0	1	0	–		2	0
TPS	2017	Naisten Liiga	16	0	2	0	–		18	0
TPS	2018	Naisten Liiga	17	0	0	0	–		17	0
TPS	Total		34	0	3	0	0	0	37	0
Honka	2019	Naisten Liiga	16	0	4	0	–		20	0
AIK	2020	Elitettan	24	0	1	0	–		25	0
AIK	2021	Damallsvenskan	21	0	2	0	–		23	0
AIK	2022	Damallsvenskan	15	0	1	0	–		16	0
AIK	Total		60	0	4	0	0	0	64	0
IK Uppsala	2023	Damallsvenskan	26	0	3	0	–		29	0
Anderlecht	2023–24	Belgian Women's Super League	15	0			–		15	0
Crystal Palace	2024–25	Women's Super League	3	0	0	0	3	0	6	0
Career total			173	0	14	0	3	0	190	0

== Honours ==
TPS

- Naisten Liiga runner-up: 2016

Honka

- Naisten Liiga runner-up: 2019

AIK

- Elitettan: 2020

Anderlecht

- Belgian Women's Super League: 2023–24
