= Rikke Dybdahl =

Danish footballer (born 1997)

Personal information
- Date of birth: 21 June 1997 (age 29)
- Place of birth: Lemvig, Denmark
- Height: 1.65 m (5 ft 5 in)
- Position: Forward

Team information
- Current team: FC Midtjylland
- Number: 12

Youth career
- –2012: Lemvig GF
- 2012–2013: Thisted FC
- 2013–2014: Team Viborg

Senior career*
Years	Team	Apps	(Gls)
2014–2018	Vildbjerg SF		
2018–2022	Thy-Thisted Q	105	(48)
2023–2024	Fortuna Hjørring	24	(10)
2024	→ Sporting de Huelva (loan)	9	(0)
2024–	FC Midtjylland		

International career^{‡}
2012	Denmark U-16	4	(0)
2012–2013	Denmark U-17	13	(6)
2015–2016	Denmark U-19	5	(0)
2019	Denmark U-23	1	(0)
- * Club domestic league appearances and goals as of June 2024 ‡ National team caps and goals as of 21:35, 26 May 2020 (UTC)

Rikke Dybdahl (born 21 July 1997) is a Danish professional footballer who plays as a forward for A-Liga club FC Midtjylland.

== Club career ==
Dybdahl has previously played for Thisted FC until 2013 and then signed with Team Viborg. In 2014, she joined Vildbjerg SF, where she played four years until 2018. In 2018, she signed a contract with FC Thy-Thisted Q.

The same season, as she moved to FC Thy-Thisted Q the club promoted to the Elitedivisionen league, where they placed 4th in their first season.

In the 2019–20 season, she is currently the fourth most scoring player in the Elitedivisionen, with 9 goals. On 9 December 2022, her transfer to Fortuna Hjørring was announced.

== International career ==
She has appeared for the Danish national youth team and Danish national junior team, several times. In 2019, she made her debut for the Denmark women's national under-23 football team, against Netherlands.
