= Fredensborg BI (women) =

- Short name: FBI
- Founded: 1971; 55 years ago
- Ground: Fredensborg Stadium
- Capacity: 2,000 (100 seated)
- Coach: Rasmus Skovby
- League: C-Liga
- 2025–26: C-Liga, 4th of 6
- Website: https://fbi-bold.dk
Home colours

Fredensborg Boldklub og Idrætsforening (commonly known as Fredensborg BI) is a Danish football club based in Fredensborg, Denmark. The club play in C-Liga, the third tier of the Danish Women's Football League.

== History ==
The club was founded in 1971 and early on mostly participated in the non-league Zealand Series, the 5th tier of the Danish football league system, with later seasons in the lower tiers. In the 2020s, the club entered the league for the first time and have spent seven seasons in the third tier, aiming for promotion. The club identifies by its ties to the royal family and in the 1930s feuded with its town counterpart, Arbejdernes Idræts Klub, a working class club known that wished to have access to the town pitch as well. The feud resurfaced when a new Frederiksborg club, Celebre Idræts Aktivister (CIA), founded in 1996, wished to also use the stadium. Fredensborg qualified for the 2027 B-Liga play-offs for the first time in the club's history, in November 2026.

== Players ==
As of 1 October 2026

Note: Flags indicate national team as defined under FIFA eligibility rules; some limited exceptions apply. Players may hold more than one non-FIFA nationality.

No.	Pos.	Nation	Player
1	GK	DEN	Sara Brunt
5	DF	DEN	Rosa Møller
6	MF	DEN	Marlene Larsen
7		DEN	Annalea Krolmark
8	MF	DEN	Sofie Mikkelsen
9		DEN	Natalie Randrup
10	MF	DEN	Andrea Godvin
11	FW	DEN	Pernille Rattunde
12	MF	DEN	Julie Wargo
13	FW	DEN	Sheena Martin
14	FW	DEN	Clara Sæbye

No.	Pos.	Nation	Player
15	MF	DEN	Cilje Ostenfeld
17	MF	GER	Laia Sarramona
20	DF	DEN	Katja Hartz
23	MF	DEN	Mathilde Gorski
24		DEN	Lærke Gravlund
26	DF	DEN	Anna Karlsson
28	MF	DEN	Annika Danielsen
50	FW	DEN	Josephine Dige
55	FW	PHI	Cathrine Graversen
63	DF	DEN	Agnete Pedersen
69	GK	DEN	Sophie Valeur

== See also ==
- Fredensborg BI (men's team)
