= Østerbro IF (women) =

- Full name: Østerbro Idræts-Forening
- Short name: ØIF
- Founded: 10 September 1998; 28 years ago
- Ground: Valby Idrætspark
- Capacity: 4,400
- Coach: Lasse Lund
- League: B-Liga
- 2025–26: B-Liga,
- Website: Østerbro IF official site

Østerbro Idræts-Forening (commonly known as Østerbro IF) is an amateur football club based in Østerbro, Copenhagen. The club plays in the B-Liga, the second tier of the Danish Women's Football League. The club was established as a merger between Østerbro Boldklub (ØB) and Ryvang in 1998. Before the merger, ØB never fielded an 11-a-side senior women's team. Østerbro IF started fielding a women's 11-a-side team in the Copenhagen Series 2 (tier 7) in 2011 and first entered the league in 2014.

== History ==
Østerbro has mostly resided in the second tier of the league in the 2010s and 2020s, with some years in the third tier. From 2019 to 2026 under head coach Michael Mejdahl Andersen, the club participated three times in the qualifications for the top flight. The club had to forgo a match in the 2026 qualification play-offs for promotion as they were hit with injuries and had players departing during the winter break. The club advocated for fairer rules for amateur clubs as they are unable to secure new players during the seasons if needed.

== Players ==
=== Current squad ===
As of 22 August 2026

Note: Flags indicate national team as defined under FIFA eligibility rules; some limited exceptions apply. Players may hold more than one non-FIFA nationality.

No.	Pos.	Nation	Player
1	GK	DEN	Trine Gaur
2	DF	DEN	Alberte Weye
3	DF	DEN	Janne Brouer
4	DF	DEN	Chrestine Hedeager
5	MF	DEN	Liva Sand Oldenburg
6	FW	DEN	Paula Groth-Hansen
8	MF	DEN	Cecilie Bergholt
9	FW	DEN	Agnes Fog-Tonnesen
10	FW	DEN	Malou Xenia Thyrrestrup
11	FW	DEN	Olivia Haaber

No.	Pos.	Nation	Player
12	DF	DEN	Andrea Jul Ougaard
13	MF	DEN	Emilie Larsen
14	DF	DEN	Silke Sofie Holme Bonnén
15	FW	DEN	Juliane Foss Gade
16	GK	DEN	Malou Huge
20	MF	DEN	Laura Gewitz
21	MF	DEN	Julie Offersen
25	FW	DEN	Kristine Dueholm
—	DF	DEN	Sara Nielsen

== Management ==
=== Coaching ===
Role	Name
Head Coach	(Denmark) Lasse Lund Larsen
Assistant Coach	(Denmark) Karsten Arenfeldt Olesen
Goalkeeping Coach	(Denmark) Michael Heintzelmann
