= FC Midtjylland (women) =

Danish women's association football team

- Full name: Football Club Midtjylland
- Nicknames: Hedens Piger (Girls of the Moor); Ulvene (The Wolves)
- Short name: FCM
- Founded: 1 July 2024; 2 years ago
- Ground: MCH Arena, Herning
- Capacity: 12,055
- Owner: The Football Collective Inc.
- Chairman: Claus Steinlein
- Coach: Claus Struck
- League: A-Liga
- 2025–26: A-Liga, 7th of 10
- Website: FC Midtjylland
Home colours	Away colours	Third colours

FC Midtjylland is a professional women's association football club based in Herning, Denmark. The team competes in the A-Liga, the top flight of the Danish Women's Football League. The club was founded in 2024.

== History ==
In 2023 FC Midtjylland announced that it would create a women's team, following UEFA's November 2022 decree that no men's clubs would be licensed to participate in any of the three European club competitions from the 2024-25 season without having an established women's branch. Midtjylland took over the license from then-B-Liga team Vildbjerg SF in 2024, with the Vildbjerg squad being absorbed into the new Midtjylland setup. The club's first season in the 1st division saw them promoted to the A-Liga, which also marked their entry as a full-time professional club.

In 2026 Sofie Vendelbo became the first ever Midtjylland player to be called up to the national team. The 27 September 2026 match with Copenhagen set a league record attendance of 1,554 spectators.

== Players ==
As of 15 September 2026

Note: Flags indicate national team as defined under FIFA eligibility rules; some limited exceptions apply. Players may hold more than one non-FIFA nationality.

No.	Pos.	Nation	Player
1	GK	DEN	Katrine Thisgaard
3	MF	UGA	Phiona Nabbumba
4	DF	DEN	Sofie Vendelbo
7	FW	DEN	Emma Nielsen
8	MF	DEN	Signe Baattrup
9	FW	DEN	Mathilde Kaihøj
10	MF	DEN	Therese Vestermark
11	FW	DEN	Maria Herdel
12	MF	DEN	Rikke Dybdahl (captain)
14	DF	DEN	Mathilde Jessen
15	FW	DEN	Nana Munk
16	DF	DEN	Jenny Ngounou

No.	Pos.	Nation	Player
17	DF	DEN	Anne Givskov
19	FW	DEN	Josefine Uhd
21	MF	DEN	Tervie Umwe
23	DF	DEN	Frida Nautrup
24	MF	DEN	Hannah Fruensgaard
25	MF	DEN	Ida-Sofie Rathe (vice-captain)
27	GK	DEN	Sofie Hoffmann
33	MF	DEN	Line Aagesen
37	DF	DEN	Maya Lefeuvre
44	FW	DEN	Andrea Jeppesen
51	DF	DEN	Sanne Troelsgaard (3rd captain)
77	GK	FIN	Milla-Maj Majasaari

=== Player records ===
==== Caps ====
Incomplete

#	Player	Caps
	(Denmark) Hannah Fruensgaard	50
	(Denmark) Mathilde Kaihøj	50
	(Uganda) Phiona Nabbumba	50

=== Captains ===
Incomplete

Years	Player
2026–	(Denmark) Rikke Dybdahl
2024–2026	(Denmark) Katrine Thisgaard
As Vildbjerg SF
–2024	(Denmark) Freya Rossen
	(Denmark) Kirstine Roland
	(Denmark) Mia Olesen
2018–	(Denmark) Julie Vermø
2017–2018	(Denmark) Sofie Kamp
–2017	(Denmark) Trine Mikkelsen

== Management ==
=== Coaching staff ===
As of 18 July 2026

Role	Name
Head Coach	(Denmark) Claus Struck
Assistant Coach	(Denmark) Iben Thisvad
Goalkeeping Coach	(Denmark) Martin Asvig Pedersen
Attacking Coach	(Denmark) Kim Pedersen
Mental Coach	(Denmark) Sanne Stensgaard
Fitness Coach	(Denmark) Mikkel Vigen
Head of Football	(Denmark) Anne Kjeldsen
Head of Coaching	(Denmark) Jesper Grønborg
Performance Director	(Denmark) Thomas Bay
Performance Analyst	(France) Arthur Roubinet
Team Manager	(Denmark) Marianne Bendix
Team Assistant	(Denmark) Pernille Axholt
Football Operations Manager	(Denmark) Kim Jessen
MEDICAL
Head of Medical	(Denmark) Malene Andersen
Team Doctor	(Denmark) Sofus Vittrup
Physical Therapist	(Denmark) Marianne Rossen

=== Club ===
Role	Name
Owner	The Football Collective Inc.
Chairman	Claus Steinlein
Sporting Director	Kristian Kamp

=== Managers ===
Incomplete

Years	Coach
2026–	(Denmark) Claus Struck
–2025	(Denmark) Steen Gravgaard
As Vildbjerg SF
2020–	(Denmark) Rasmus Hansen
–2020	(Denmark) Henrik Varbøl
	(Denmark) Henrik Bull Skov
	(Denmark) Allan Kristensen

== Seasons ==
As of the 2025–26 season

Key
(gold) Champions	Promotion
(silver) Silver	Relegation
(bronze) Bronze	Did not qualify

Season	Tier	#	W	D	L	F	A	Pts.	Cup	UWCL
2024–25	2	1st of 8								
2025–26	1	7th of 10	2	3	9	14	30	9		
2026–27	1									
