= Odense Boldklub Q =

Danish women's association football team in Odense, Denmark

OB Q
- Full name: Odense Boldklub Q
- Nicknames: De Stribede (The Striped); Striwerne (The Stripes in Eastern-Funish dialect)
- Short name: OB
- Founded: 1971; 55 years ago
- Ground: Nature Energy Park, Odense
- Capacity: 15,790
- Owner: Odense Sport & Event
- Chairman: John Bæksted
- Coach: Kasper Mayland
- League: A-Liga
- 2025–26: A-Liga, 8th of 8
- Website: https://ob.dk/hold/kvinder
Home colours	Away colours	Third colours

Odense Boldklub Q (commonly referred to as OB Q) is a Danish women's football team based in Odense, Denmark. OB Q compete in A-Liga, the Danish top-flight division and play their matches at the Nature Energy Park stadium. One of their biggest results is reaching the quarter-finals of the 2002 Champions League (Note: Known then as the UEFA Cup).

== History ==
=== OB Women ===
The team was founded in 1971 as the women's football section of Odense Boldklub. The team played in non-league and in 1982 they were promoted to the Denmark Series, the then-second tier (now the fourth tier) of the Danish league system. In 1989 the team secured promotion into the league for the first time as they entered the A-Liga (then known as the 1st Division). After losing the 1995 Danish Women's Cup final to Fortuna Hjørring, the team gained revenge in 1998 by beating Fortuna in the final and securing their first Cup win. Odense also won the Cup in 1999 and 2003, and the league title in 2000 and 2001.

=== Odense Q ===
Citing a lack of support from Odense Boldklub, the team decided to break away and form an independent women's football club under the name Odense Q from the 2016–17 season onwards. A new logo was created, inspired by Hans Christian Andersen's The Ugly Duckling. The team played in a Bordeaux red jersey.

=== OB Q ===
In June 2023 the club, alongside Odense Boldklub, announced the 90% purchase of Odense Q by Odense Sport & Event, joining the women's and men's team once again. The club was renamed Odense Boldklub Q. The purchase came a little over six months following the November 2022 announcement by UEFA that the license to participate in any of the three European competitions would only be afforded to men's clubs that had a women's branch setup from the 2024–2025 season.

In July 2025 the club announced that the international player contingent would depart the club, citing an approach to building the squad under the moniker, "IdentitetOB".

== Players ==
=== Current squad ===
As of 12 September 2026

Note: Flags indicate national team as defined under FIFA eligibility rules; some limited exceptions apply. Players may hold more than one non-FIFA nationality.

No.	Pos.	Nation	Player
1	GK	DEN	Laura Worsøe (vice-captain)
2	DF	DEN	Laura Sehested
3	DF	DEN	Emilie Henriksen (captain)
4	DF	DEN	Laura Holt
5	DF	DEN	Ida Olsen
6	MF	DEN	Lærke Friis
7	MF	DEN	Mille Bech
8	MF	DEN	Ester Dahlmann
9	FW	FRO	Anna Brændstrup
10	FW	DEN	Liv Rasmussen
12	MF	DEN	Silja Snerle
13	DF	DEN	Björk Mølgaard
15	DF	AUS	Emma Ilijoski

No.	Pos.	Nation	Player
16	MF	DEN	Emilie Lajmiri
17	FW	DEN	Frøya Stubgaard
18	MF	DEN	Louise Wadstrøm
19	FW	DEN	Camilla Rexbye
20	DF	DEN	Sofie Thrige
21	MF	DEN	Signe Lorentzen
22	DF	NOR	Seline Rekkedal
23	MF	DEN	Laura Pauli
24	DF	DEN	Marie Holmgaard
26	MF	DEN	Sofie Yde
30	GK	DEN	Celine Toft
—	DF	DEN	Kaya Bang
—	DF	DEN	Andrea Friis (on loan from HB Køge)

=== Captains ===
Incomplete

Years	Player
2025–	(Denmark) Emilie Henriksen
2023–2025	(Denmark) Signe Boysen
2021–2023	(Denmark) Kamilla Ørskov Jensen
2016–2021	(Denmark) Tenna Kappel
ODENSE Q
–2016	(Denmark) Victoria Black
	(Denmark) Stine Kristensen

=== Player records ===
Incomplete

==== Caps ====
#	Player	Caps
	(Denmark)	
	(Denmark) Tenna Kappel	114
	(Denmark) Kamilla Ørskov	112
	(Denmark)	

=== Former players ===
For details of former players, see Category:Odense Boldklub Q players.

== Management ==
=== Coaching staff ===
As of 12 July 2026

Role	Name
Manager	(Denmark) Kasper Mayland
Assistant Coach	(Denmark) Casper Nielsen (Denmark) Ulrik Jepsen
Goalkeeping Coach	(Denmark) Morten Hansen
Fitness Coach	(Denmark) Kristian Petersen
Mental Coach	(Denmark) Michelle Sundahl
Team Manager	(Denmark) Karina Hartwig Sundahl

=== Club offcials ===
Role	Name
Sporting Director	(Denmark) Mikkel Bo Mikkelsen

=== Managers ===
Years	Name
2026–	(Denmark) Kasper Mayland
2025	(Denmark) Peer Lisdorf
2024	(Denmark) Jeppe Abel & Thomas Johansen (interim)
2024	(Denmark) Kristian Mørch
2023	(Denmark) Bo Sundahl
Odense Q
2020–2023	(Denmark) Bo Sundahl
2019	(Denmark) Steen Hansen
2018–2019	(Denmark) Morten Christiansen
2017	(Denmark) Jakob Pavar Langhoff
2016	(Denmark) Said Sannes
OB
2012–2016	(Denmark) Thomas Hansen
2008–2012	(Denmark) Jesper Eriksen
2005–2006	(Denmark) Marlene Kristensen
2005	(Denmark) Torben Poulsen
2004	(Denmark) Niels Just
2003–2004	(Denmark) Kenneth Rasmussen
2002	(Denmark) Hans Peter Utoft
2000–2001	(Denmark) Peer Danefeld
1999–2000	(Denmark) Jan Knudsen
–1999	(Denmark) Erling Thomsen
1971–	(Denmark) Steen Frank & Ulrik Præstegaard

- Source: OB Q | Danish Football Association (in Danish)

== Seasons ==
As of the 2025–26 season

Key
(gold) Champions	Promotion
(silver) Silver	Relegation
(bronze) Bronze	

The table lists the results of the regular season, but the final position achieved.
Incomplete

Season	Tier	#	W	D	L	F	A	Pts.	Cup	UWCL
DIVISION WEST (2nd of 2) (Note: The league was originally divided into two groups of 10 teams, representing the east and the west of the country.)
1975										
1976										
1977										
1978										
1979										
1980										
SINGLE-DIVISION LEAGUE (Note: From the 1981 season onwards, the league was changed to a single division encompassing the 12 best teams from across the country.)
1981										
1982	5									
1983	4									
1984	4									
1985	4									
1986	4									
1987	4									
1988	4									
1989	4									
1990	1									
1991	1									
1992	1									
1993	1									
1994	1									
1995	1	3rd of 8	14	2	12	64	54	44	2nd	
1996	1									
1996–97	1	3rd of 8	18	1	9	72	51	55		
1997–98	1	3rd of 8	20	2	6	97	39	62	1st	
1998–99	1	3rd of 8	18	3	7	73	42	57	1st	
1999–00	1	1st of 8	21	1	4	91	32	64		
2000–01	1	1st of 8	17	8	3	77	35	59	QF	
2001–02	1	4th of 8	16	3	9	85	55	51	QF	QF
2002–03	1	3rd of 8	13	2	6	53	18	41	1st	
2003–04	1	5th of 8	7	1	13	25	52	22		
2004–05	1	6th of 8	4	3	14	23	58	15		
2005–06	1	8th of 8	3	3	15	12	60	12		
2006–07	2	2nd of 12	20	0	2	115	25	60		
2007–08	1	6th of 10	5	0	0	20	2	24		
2008–09	1	5th of 10	4	0	1	18	6	25		
2009–10	1	4th of 10	0	0	6	6	27	15		
2010–11	1	4th of 10	1	1	4	8	20	20		
2011–12	1	5th of 10	3	0	2	19	7	22		
2012–13	1	3rd of 8	0	2	4	3	15	17		
2013–14	1	3rd of 8	5	0	5	15	16	25	2nd	
2014–15	1	5th of 8	2	0	8	13	25	21		
2015–16	1	5th of 8	2	3	5	12	14	18		
As Odense Q (Note: In 2016, the team broke away from Odense Boldklub (OB) citing a lack of support and investment, to form its own club, Odense Q, from the 2016-17 season until 2023, when they were bought back and reunited with their former club, to form the current iteration, OB Q.)
2016–17	1	7th of 8	7	1	2	32	9	22		
2017–18	1	6th of 8	1	0	9	7	33	3		
2018–19	1	8th of 8	6	1	3	27	16	19		
2019–20	1	9th	2	1	2	12	9	7		
2020–21	2	3rd of 6	5	3	2	23	13	18		
2021–22	2	6th of 8	0	2	8	4	19	2		
2022–23	2	5th of 8	2	2	6	17	19	8		
As OB Q
2023–24	2	1st of 8	8	2	0	27	3	26		
2024–25	1	5th of 8	4	6	4	19	17	18		
2025–26	1	10th of 10	1	1	12	6	40	4		
2026–27	1	Season in progress								

Sources

- OB – Danish Football Association (in Danish)
- Varnich, Sofie Dambæk (2017-07-12). "130 år: Striwerne fra Odense har fødselsdag". TV 2 Fyn | Fynske nyheder - lokalt hver dag (in Danish).

== Honours ==
Incomplete

Honour	No.	Years
A-Liga	2	(gold) 1999–2000, 2000–01
A-Liga	6	(bronze) 1995, 1996–97, 1997–98, 1998–99, 2012–13, 2013–14
Danish Cup	3	(gold) 1997–98, 1998–99, 2002–03
Danish Cup	2	(silver) 1995, 2013–14

== See also ==
- Odense Boldklub, men's team

== Sources ==
- "Mesterlig start for OB-kvinder | faa.dk". fyens.dk (in Danish). 2000-08-07.
- "Danefeld siger farvel med topkamp | fyens.dk". fyens.dk (in Danish). 2001-11-17.
- "OBs kvindelige mesterhold i opløsning". Politiken - Den levende avis (in Danish). 2001-07-26.
- "OB-kvinder i kamp for DBU-tilskud | faa.dk". fyens.dk (in Danish). 2001-12-17.
- "Thomas Hansen ny 3F-cheftræner i OB | Fodbold for piger". www.fodboldforpiger.dk (in Danish). 2012-07-06.
- Rasmussen, Leif (2016-06-12). "OB-træner stopper hos kvinderne | fyens.dk". fyens.dk (in Danish).
