= F.C. Copenhagen (women) =

Copenhagen
- Full name: Football Club Copenhagen
- Nickname: Løvinderne (The Lionesses)
- Short name: FCK; Copenhagen
- Founded: 2024; 2 years ago
- Ground: Vanløse Idrætspark
- Capacity: 10,000
- Owner: FC Copenhagen Women's Football A/S
- Chairman: Henrik Møgelmose
- Coach: Fabiana Alcalà (interim)
- League: A-Liga
- 2025–26: B-Liga, 2nd of 6 (promoted)
- Website: FCK
| Home colours | Away colours |

F.C. Copenhagen (commonly known as FCK; internationally as Copenhagen) is a Danish women's football team based in Copenhagen, Denmark. The club compete in A-Liga, the top-flight of the Danish Women's Football League.

== History ==
The club was founded in 2024, following UEFA's November 2022 decree that no men's clubs would be licensed to participate in any of the three European club competitions from the 2024-25 season without having an established women's branch. Copenhagen acquired the license of then-third tier side F.C. Damsø from the 2024-25 season onwards.

A reported DKK 10 million were invested in the project with the goal of reaching the top flight as fast as possible and establishing the team as among the best teams in the Danish league. Copenhagen reached their goal of promotion in their first season, achieving promotion to the 2025–26 B-Liga. The following season they secured promotion to the A-Liga.

On 30 May 2026 Copenhagen earned promotion to A-Liga, the top-flight in the Danish Women's Football League following their victory against FC Thy-Thisted Q, achieving back-to-back promotion through the league ranks. The following day, 31 May, Danish media outlet TV 2 published a feature citing anonymous sources critiquing the management of the club and contesting the notion that the standards and facilities are high priority, citing unfulfilled promises of investment and prioritising of the women's department.

Following three consecutive losses in their first three matches in the top-flight, manager Kasper Klarskov was sacked in August 2026. Assistant Coach Fabiana Alcalà took over as interim head coach. Alcalà was the first woman to serve as head coach in the Danish men's divisions with AB in May 2024. After 4 losses in the first 4 matches, they won the first ever women's Copenhagen Derby 3-1. Following a tough 9–1 defeat against Nordsjælland, Copenhagen won their first match in the league 3–1 against Brøndby in the first ever A-Liga New Firm derby.

== Players ==
As of 2 September 2026

Note: Flags indicate national team as defined under FIFA eligibility rules; some limited exceptions apply. Players may hold more than one non-FIFA nationality.

| No. | Pos. | Nation | Player |
|---|---|---|---|
| 2 | DF | DEN | Silja Weinell |
| 4 | DF | DEN | Olivia Bergmann |
| 5 | DF | NZL | Ally Green |
| 6 | DF | DEN | Ida Skovbo (captain) |
| 7 | MF | DEN | Julie Børkop |
| 8 | MF | FIN | Emmaliina Tulkki |
| 9 | FW | DEN | Maria Hovmark |
| 10 | MF | DEN | Sarah Jankovska |
| 11 | FW | DEN | Emma Brandt |
| 12 | FW | FIN | Dana Leskinen |
| 13 | FW | DEN | Asii Berthelsen |
| 14 | FW | DEN | Rebeka Winther |
| 15 | FW | DEN | Viktoria Wik |
| 17 | MF | DEN | Anisa Saini |

| No. | Pos. | Nation | Player |
|---|---|---|---|
| 19 | FW | DEN | Anna Hemmingsen |
| 20 | MF | DEN | Josefine Svava |
| 21 | GK | GER | Ann-Kathrin Dilfer |
| 22 | DF | ISL | Sunneva Sigurvinsdóttir |
| 23 | DF | DEN | Sofie Di Tranholm |
| 25 | DF | ENG | Lucy Roberts |
| 26 | MF | DEN | Sofie Cajus Boisen |
| 27 | FW | SWE | Maja Johansson (on loan from FC Rosengård) |
| 28 | MF | DEN | Frederikke Trolle |
| 29 | FW | DEN | Frederikke Benfeldt |
| 31 | GK | RSA | Jessica Williams |
| 32 | MF | DEN | Frederikke Boisen |
| 41 | GK | DEN | Astrid Husemoen |
| 42 | FW | DEN | Sille Fuhlendorff |

== Management ==
As of 21 August 2026

=== First team ===
| Position | Staff |
|---|---|
| Head Coach | (Spain) Fabiana Alcalà (interim) |
| Fitness Coach | Annabelle Roche |
| Goalkeeping Coach | (Denmark) Sonny Vestergaard |
| Team Manager | (Denmark) Dan Lindqvist |
| Analytics | (Denmark) Daniel Grenaa |
| Physiotherapist | (Denmark) Dae Jin Kim |

=== Club ===
| Position | Staff |
|---|---|
| Owner | Parken Sport & Entertainment |
| Chief Executive | (Denmark) Mikkel Grove Lindsted |
| Head of Football | (South Africa) Romaney Pinnock |

=== Managers ===
| Years | Coach |
|---|---|
| 2026– | (Spain) Fabiana Alcalà (interim) |
| 2024–2026 | (Denmark) Kasper Klarskov |

== Seasons ==
As of the 2025–26 season

Key
| (gold) Champions | Promotion |
| (silver) Silver | Relegation |
| (bronze) Bronze | |

| Season | Tier | # | W | D | L | F | A | Pts. | Cup |
|---|---|---|---|---|---|---|---|---|---|
| 2024–25 | 3 | 1st of 5 | 16 | 4 | 0 | 53 | 11 | 52 | SF |
| 2025–26 | 2 | 2nd of 6 | 6 | 2 | 2 | 19 | 9 | 20 | R16 |
| 2026–27 | 1 | | | | | | | | |

== See also ==
- F.C. Copenhagen (men's team)
