= List of Danish Women's Football League clubs =

Football pyramid
Tier	Division
1	A-Liga
2	B-Liga
3	C-Liga
	NON-LEAGUE
4	Denmark Series
5	Regional Denmark Series
6	Series 1
7	Series 2

This is a list of Danish Women's Football League clubs past and present, including clubs which have become defunct, merged, created superstructures with one or several neighbouring clubs, or have been relegated to a lower non-league position in the Danish league pyramid. Where a defunct club has been succeeded by a phoenix club, the new club is listed. If a club now only fields youth teams and no senior women's teams, the club's senior women's department is listed as inactive.

The table shows the first and last seasons in which each club competed in the Danish Women's Football League, including the total number of league seasons, and the total of seasons spent in the top division. Some clubs' membership was intermittent between their first and last seasons. The current name of a club is listed even though the name might differ from when the club competed in the Danish Women's Football League — see footnotes for details. Regional association affiliations are listed, as is current division, indicating whether a club is part of the league or playing at non-league level.

As of the 2025–26 season, a total of 130 different teams have competed in the Danish Women's Football League since its inception, including sixteen (semi-professional) superstructures involving multiple clubs, sixty-one now defunct or inactive senior women's teams and six reserve squads.

In the 1996 season, AC Ballerup (Note: AC Ballerup was a superstructure, originally formed in January 1996 by Skovlunde IF, Ballerup IF, Grantoftens IF, Ballerup FC Lundegården and Lille Hema af 1973, with Skovlunde IF's senior women's team becoming the parent clubs' joint first team. The women's department of Skovlunde IF discontinued their engagement before the start of the 2000 season, leaving AC Ballerup without a women's team.) became the first superstructure in the league. Reserve teams were allowed in the second tier starting with the 2017–18 season, with Fortuna Hjørring (2), VSK Aarhus (2) and Kolding BK (KoldingQ reserves) being the first reserve squads in the league. The reserve team of KoldingQ only partook in the second division between July and October 2021, before being merged into the newly established Kolding IF Women. With the addition of the third division from the 2021–22 season onwards, the ceiling for reserve teams was downgraded to the third tier.

Seventy-four different teams have participated in the top flight. No team has appeared in every season since 1975, with Fortuna Hjørring the closest, having missed just one season in 1979. Vildbjerg SF have had the most league seasons (12) in the league without ever reaching the top tier. Being the largest regional football association, the Jutland FA have had the highest number of member clubs complete in the league.

As of the 2025–26 season

Club	League seasons				2025–26	Region	Ref.
Club	Total	Top tier	First	Last	2025–26	Region	Ref.
AB Tårnby (Note: Founded in January 2009, AB Tårnby is a merger between Tårnby BK and AB 1970. The founding clubs ceased to exist as entities.)	1	—	2009–10	2009–10	Copenhagen Series 1	Copenhagen	
Allerød FK	3	—	2021–22	—	Denmark Series	Zealand	
ASA Fodbold	15	1	2011–12	—	B-Liga	Jutland	.
AC Ballerup	3	1	1996	1999	Defunct	Zealand	
B 1909 (Note: The women's association football department of B 1909 was established in 1971. Half way through the 1994 season, B 1909 withdrew its senior teams from the top-flight and regional leagues due to a bankruptcy, subsequently leading to the women's department being dissolved.)	20	20	1975	1994	Inactive	Funen	
B1913 (Note: Inactive since 2024–25 season)	8	1	2006–07	2014–15	Inactive	Funen	
B 1921 (Note: Founded in July 2013, Nykøbing FC is a merger between B 1901 and B 1921. The founding clubs ceased to exist as separate entities.)	13	2	1976	2012–13	Defunct	Lolland-Falster	
B52/Aalborg FC	20	10	1975	2007–08	Jutland Series 2	Jutland	
B.73 Slagelse	7	—	2006–07	—	C-Liga	Zealand	
B.93 (Note: Founded in July 2012, Fodboldalliancen B.93/HIK/Skjold was a superstructure between the football departments of B.93, Hellerup IK and BK Skjold. In July 2014, the name of the first team was changed to B.93/HIK/Ryparken and the reserve and youth teams were renamed FA København, when BK Skjold was replaced by BK Ryparken. The co-operation withdrew from the top-flight league in September 2014, reorganised in the summer of 2015 and subsequently dissolved at the end of 2015.)	9	2	2017–18	—	B-Liga	Copenhagen	
B.93/HIK/Ryparken	3	3	2012–13	2014–15	Defunct	Copenhagen	
Ballerup-Skovlunde Fodbold (Note: Founded in July 2010, Ballerup-Skovlunde Fodbold is a merger between the men's and women's football departments of Ballerup IF and Skovlunde IF. The founding clubs' football departments ceased to exist as entities.)	16	10	2010–11	—	C-Liga	Zealand	
Ballerup-Skovlunde Fodbold (2)	1	—	2018–19	2018–19	Zealand Series	Zealand	.
Billum IF (Note: The women's association football department of Billum IF was established in 1970 at the club's foundation. Janderup Billum Samarbejde was initially started as a youth football co-operation between Janderup FS and Billum IF in 1986, subsequently leading to a merger between the clubs' football departments.)	1	1	1975	1975	Defunct	Jutland	
Bispebjerg BK (Note: The women's association football department of Bispebjerg BK was established in 1972, but ceased to exist after the senior team was withdrawn from its regional league in 1999. An re-establishment occurred in 2013, once again fielding a senior 11-a-side squad in the fall of 2020. The club hasn't been active since 2022.)	2	2	1975	1979	Defunct	Copenhagen	
Brabrand	4	—	2022–23	—	C-Liga	Jutland	
Brande IF (Note: The women's association football department of Brande IF was established in 1970. Brande IF did not field a senior women's 11-a-side squad from 2018–2026. They are in Series 1 as of the 2026–27 season.) (Note: In 1997, FC Midtjyden was originally formed as a women's youth co-operation between Brande IF, Uhre G&IF, SF Give Fremad and SF Frem Thyregod. SF Give Fremad and SF Frem Thyregod discontinued their engagement before the start of the 1999 season, while Brande IF and Uhre G&IF expanded the co-operation to also include senior women squads. In mid-2010, FC Midtjyden was dissolved.)	3	3	1975	1980	Jutland Series 1	Jutland	
Brøndby IF	32	31	1995	—	A-Liga	Zealand	
Brønshøj BK (Note: The women's football department at Brønshøj BK was established in 1973. The club withdrew their senior women's 11-a-side squad from the 2009 spring season, not fielding a side since then.)	1	—	1996	1996	Inactive	Copenhagen	
Copenhagen (Note: Copenhagen took over their license from the 2024–25 season. Damsø is now a reserve team for Copenhagen.)	2	–	2024–25	–	B-Liga	Copenhagen	.
Dalum/Næsby (Note: Founded in January 2017, Dalum/Næsby Pigefodbold is a superstructure originally established at youth level between the women's departments of Dalum IF and Næsby BK. The superstructure incorporated the reserve teams in January 2021 and the first senior women's 11-a-side squad in July 2021 under the name Dalum/Næsby Kvinde- og Pigefodbold.)	6	—	2020–21	—	C-Liga	Funen	
FC Damsø	16	1	2008–09	2023–24	Denmark Series	Copenhagen	
Esbjerg fB (Note: Esbjerg fB and Varde IF merged in 2025, with Esbjerg taking over the tier 2 level license from Varde. Varde is now the reserve team for Esbjerg fB.)	1	–	2025–26	–	B-Liga	Jutland	
BK Femina (Note: Founded in October 1959, BK Femina withdrew its senior team from the nation-wide second division following the conclusion of the 2000 fall season. The club have since then not fielded a senior 11-a-side, and folded in or around 2020, not submitting teams to any competition held by the Zealand FA.)	16	14	1975	2000	Defunct	Zealand	
IF Fladså (Note: Founded in January 2005, FK Sydsjælland 05 is a merger between Korskilde IF and the football department of IF Fladså. The founding clubs ceased to exist as entities.)	2	2	1985	1986	Defunct	Zealand	
Fortuna Hjørring (Note: Founded in October 1966 under the name Frems Venner as a branch of Hjørring AIK Frem, the name was changed to Frems Dameafdeling in 1973. When the club became a separate association football club in 1977, the name was changed to Dameboldklubben Fortuna Hjørring.)	51	50	1975	—	A-Liga	Jutland	
Fortuna Hjørring (2)	4	—	2017–18	2020–21	Denmark Series	Jutland	
Fortuna Svendborg (Note: Founded in April 2011, Fortuna Svendborg has not fielded a senior women's 11-a-side squad since the 2017 spring season, reintroducing it shortly for the 2021 fall season.)	1	—	2014–15	2014–15	Funen Series	Funen	
Fredensborg BI	5	—	2020–21	—	C-Liga	Zealand	
Fredericia KFUM (Note: Founded in January 2017, Fredericia KFK is a superstructure, originally formed between the football departments of Erritsø G&IF, Fredericia KFUM, Taulov-Skærbæk IF and Bredstrup-Pjedsted IF. Ahead of the 2018 season, the name was changed to Fredericia KF. Taulov-Skærbæk IF withdrew from the co-operation in June 2018, while Trelde G&IF joined in February 2020.)	1	—	2011–12	2011–12	Inactive	Jutland	
Frederiksberg BK (Note: Founded in January 2002, FV København was a superstructure, formed by Frederiksberg BK and Vanløse IF, becoming the parent clubs' joint first team. The superstructure was dissolved at the end of 2003, and Frederiksberg BK declined to play remaining part of the tournament with their own league license.)	10	6	1977	2020–21	Copenhagen Series 2	Copenhagen	
Frederiksværk FK (Note: The women's association football department of Frederiksværk FK was established in 2004 at the club's foundation. The club have not fielded a senior women's 11-a-side squad between the 2014 spring and 2015 spring seasons, and since 2020.)	1	—	2011–12	2011–12	Zealand Series 2	Zealand	
Freja Sydsjælland (Note: Founded in January 2004 (2003?), Freja Sydsjælland was a superstructure formed by the women's football departments of Baarse IF and Præstø IF, becoming the parent clubs' joint first team. The senior women's 11-a-side squad was withdrawn ahead of the 2005 fall season, effectively dissolving the superstructure.)	1	—	2004–05	2004–05	Defunct	Zealand	.
Fremad Amager (Note: Fremad Amager last fielded an 11-a-side squad in the 2024–25 season in Copenhagen Series 1.)	1	—	2021–22	2021–22	Inactive	Copenhagen	
Fremad Valby	1	—	2025–26	—	C-Liga	Copenhagen	.
Frigg, Næstved	2	1	1991	1993	Defunct	Zealand	.
FV København	2	2	2001–02	2003–04	Defunct	Copenhagen	
Glamsbjerg IF (Note: The women's football department at Glamsbjerg IF was established in 19??. The club did not field a senior women's 11-a-side squad between 1989 and 2019, reintroducing it for the 2020 fall season.)	1	1	1979	1979	Inactive	Funen	
Greve Fodbold (Note: The women's football department at Greve IF was established in 1972, fielding a senior women's 11-a-side squad for the first time in 1985. In the spring of 2004, the women's and men's association football sections of the sports club was reorganised as a separate club under the name Greve Fodbold. Ahead of the 2018 fall season, the club's first team was pulled from the second-highest division, but was reinstated in January 2019 at a lower level.) (Note: AC 2670 Greve was a superstructure formed in February/April 2004 between the women's football departments of Greve Fodbold and Hundige BK. The co-operation was dissolved in late 2009.) (Note: GS Elite was a superstructure formed in July 2011 between the women's football departments of Greve Fodbold and Solrød FC. The co-operation was dissolved in January 2014)	5	1	1989	2018–19	Zealand Series 1	Zealand	
Grønbjerg IF (Note: In 1972, the women's football department at Grønbjerg IF was established. Ahead of the 2003 season, Grønbjerg IF withdrew its team from the regional top-flight league, not fielding a senior women's 11-a-side squad after 2002. A senior women's team was reestablished under Spjald IF, while the men's football department was reestablished under Grønbjerg IF.) (Note: Founded in May 2013, Grønbjerg Aktiv Forening For Alle (GAFFA) is a merger between Grønbjerg G&UF, Grønbjerg IF and Grønbjerg UK. The founding clubs ceased to exist as separate entities.)	3	1	1992	1994	Defunct	Jutland	
HB-FC Horsens (Note: Founded in 199?, HB-FC Horsens was a superstructure formed by the women's departments of Horsens BK and FC Horsens, becoming the parent clubs' joint first team. The superstructure was dissolved after the 1999 season.)	1	—	1999	1999	Defunct	Jutland	
HB Køge (Note: Founded in the spring of 2016, HB Køge Pigefodbold was originally a superstructure at youth level between the women's departments of Borup IF, Dalby G&IF, Haslev FC, Svogerslev BK, Køge Pige FC, Køge BK og Herfølge BK, fielding their first senior women's 11-a-side squad in the 2017 spring season. Hellested IF joined in February 2019. In July 2020, the club was integrated into HB Køge and renamed HB Køge Women.)	7	6	2019–20	—	A-Liga	Zealand	
Herlev IF	1	1	1978	1978	Inactive	Zealand	.
Herlufsholm GF (Note: Founded in July 2021, Næstved HG is a superstructure formed between Næstved IF Fodbold and the women's football department of Herlufsholm GF, becoming the parent clubs' joint first team. Herlufsholm serves as the reserves team in the lower divisions.)	6	—	2015–16	2020–21	Zealand Series	Zealand	.
Herning IK (Note: The women's football department at Herning IK was established in 1973. The club did not field a senior women's 11-a-side squad in two periods, namely 2010–2011 and 2013 (fall)–2017.) (Note: Founded in month? 2000, Herning FC was a superstructure between the women's football departments of Herning IK and Herning KFUM, becoming the parent clubs' joint first team between 2001 and 2005.)	7	6	1977	1995	Jutland Series 1	Jutland	
Herrested G&IF (Note: Founded in December 1983, HERIF is a merger between the women's football departments of Herrested G&IF and Rolfsted IF.)	5	5	1977	1981	Defunct	Funen	
Hillerød Fodbold (Note: Founded in August 1970, Hillerød G&IF Damefodbold became a separate women's association football club in 1977. In October 2010, the club went bankrupt. Shortly hereafter, a phoenix club was set up referred to as Hillerød G&IF Damefodbold af 2010. In August 2018, the club merged with Hillerød Fodbold, unifying men's and women's football into one club. The women's football department last fielded a senior women's 11-a-side squad in the summer of 2019.)	18	15	1983	2016–17	Inactive	Zealand	
Hjortshøj-Egaa IF (Note: Hjortshøj-Egaa IF's women's association football department was established in the early 1970s, assembling their first senior team in 1973. The license for the club's two elite senior women teams was transferred to IK Skovbakken Kvindefodbold in January 2002, leaving behind a women's youth department and a lower ranking senior women team. They have not fielded a senior women's 11-a-side squad since the 2015 spring season.) (Note: A women's youth department at IK Skovbakken Fodbold was established in 1994. In January 2002 — halfway through the 2001–02 season — Hjortshøj-Egaa IF's two elite women squads, playing in the national and regional top-flight leagues, merged with IK Skovbakken's women's youth department for economic reasons.)	27	27	1976	2001–02	Inactive	Jutland	
Holstebro KFUM	1	1	1977	1977	Defunct	Jutland	.
Horsens SIK (Note: Founded in January 2000, Horsens SIK was a superstructure formed by FC Horsens and Stensballe IK, becoming the parent clubs' joint first team. The superstructure was dissolved in the summer of 2015.)	15	4	2000	2013–14	Defunct	Jutland	
JAI Fodbold (Note: Withdrew from C-Liga halfway through the 2025–26 season and is in Series 2.)	7	—	2019–20	—	C-Liga	Jutland	
KFUM København (Note: The women's football department at KFUM København was established in 1970. The club withdrew its senior women's team from the regional top-flight in the 1999 season, resubmitting an 11-a-side squad for the 2001 season. For the 2012 fall season, KFUM did not field a senior women's 11-a-side squad.)	1	1	1980	1980	Copenhagen Series	Copenhagen	
FC King George	1	—	2024–25	2024–25	Jutland Series 2	Jutland	
Kolding B (Note: The women's association football department of Kolding BK was established in 1971. In the mid-1996, the women's department was closed following a merger with Kolding IF, with the senior women's team continuing playing under the Kolding IF banner. In 2000, Kolding BK once again fielded a senior 11-a-side, which happened under the banner of Kolding IF. In the summer of 2006, Kolding BK was handed the administration of Kolding IF's senior women's team, with the senior women's team now playing under the Kolding BK banner.) (Note: Founded in 2005, Kolding FCQ was a superstructure between the women's youth association football departments of Kolding BK, Kolding IF and Nørre Bjært Strandhuse IF, playing in Kolding FC associated kits. In 2007, Kolding IF discontinued their engagement, and in 2008 the co-operation was renamed KoldingQ. In August 2009, KoldingQ embraced Kolding BK's first senior women's team, while the reserve teams continued to play under the Kolding BK banner. Nørre Bjært Strandhuse IF left the co-operation in or around 2013?. In July 2019, KoldingQ became a separate association football club encompassing teams for seniors, under-18 and under-16.)	16	14	1975	2008–09	Jutland Series 1	Jutland	
Kolding B (KQ 2)	1	—	2017–18	2017–18	Defunct	Jutland	.
Kolding IF (Note: In September 2021, it was announced that KoldingQ would merge and become part of Kolding IF, which occurred at the end of October 2021 — the first match under the Kolding IF Women banner was played on 1 November 2021.)	14	6	1997	—	A-Liga	Jutland	
Kolding IF (2) (Note: KIF reserve team)	5	—	2021–22	2023–24	Inactive	Jutland	
KoldingQ	11	11	2009–10	2020–21	Defunct	Jutland	
Køge BK (2) (Note: The women's football department at Køge BK was established in January 1972. The club withdrew their senior women's 11-a-side squad from the 2005 fall season, reintroducing it for the 2020 fall season.)	7	—	1997	2023–24	Zealand Series	Zealand	
Lemvig GF	1	—	1993	1993	Jutland Series	Jutland	
Lunde G&IF (Note: The women's football department at Lunde G&IF was established in 19??. The club last fielded a senior women's 11-a-side squad in the 2015 spring season.)	8	—	2001	2009–10	Defunct	Funen	
IF Lyseng (Note: AGF reserves) (Note: Founded in July 2020, AGF Kvindefodbold is a superstructure formed between AGF Fodbold and the women's football departments of VSK Aarhus and IF Lyseng Fodbold, becoming the parent clubs' joint first team. Aarhus Gymnastikforening did not previously feature any women's football teams.)	7	—	2016–17	2022–23	Denmark Series	Jutland	
BK Mariendal (Note: BK Mariendal's women's association football department was established in the late 1960s/early 1970s. The senior women's 11-a-side squad was withdrawn during the 1980 season, and the women's department folded shortly hereafter.)	2	2	1976	1977	Defunct	Copenhagen	
Mejrup G&UF (Note: The women's football department at Mejrup G&UF was established in the mid-1970s. The club did not field a senior women's 11-a-side squad after the 2004 spring season, but reintroduced it for the 2008 spring season.)	6	—	1993	1999	Jutland Series	Jutland	
Midtjylland (Note: FC Midtjylland was founded in 2024 and took over the license from then-tier 2 side Vildbjerg SF. VSF was absorbed into FCM.)	2	1	2024–25	–	A-Liga	Copenhagen	.
FK Munkholm (Note: The women's football department at FK Munkholm was established in 1979. In 2009 (senior) and 2010 (youth) respectively, the women's department of FK Munkholm was dissolved and merged into Holbæk B&IF.) (Note: Founded in January 2005, M/V-05 Holbæk (or Munkholm-Vipperød) was a superstructure between the women's departments of FK Munkholm and Vipperød BK. The superstructure was dissolved at the end of the 2008 fall season.)	1	—	2003–04	2003–04	Defunct	Zealand	
M/V-05 Holbæk	2	—	2005–06	2006–07	Defunct	Zealand	
Nakskov BK (Note: Nakskov BK's women's association football department was established in the 1970. On two occasions in the 2000s, Nakskov BK have fielded a senior women's 11-a-side squad in co-operation with another club (first Rudbjerg FB and then BK Velo Nakskov), and last fielded their own senior women's team in the 2000 spring season. In July 2015, Nakskov BK and BK Velo Nakskov merged to form FC Nakskov, with the founding clubs ceasing to exist as entities.)	4	4	1975	1982	Defunct	Lolland-Falster	
NB Bornholm (Note: Founded in 1915, Nexø BK went bankrupt in 1990. Shortly hereafter, a phoenix club was set up referred to as Nexø Boldklub af 1990. In 2009, the club was rebranded as NB Bornholm. The women's football department was established in 1970 and last fielded a senior women's 11-a-side squad in the 2009 spring season.) (Note: Founded in the summer of 2012, FQ Bornholm was a senior women's superstructure between the football departments of IK Viking, Rønne IK, Knudsker IF, Ny-Vest IF, Nyker IF, Aarsballe BK, NB Bornholm, Pedersker IF, Poulsker IF, Hasle IF, Østermarie IF, Klemensker IF and Aakirkeby IF. In August 2013, the superstructure changed its name to Elite Bornholm Senior and did not field a squad after the 2013 fall season. It remained separate from the youth co-operation named Elite Bornholm that was established in March 2010.) (Note: Founded in the summer of 2020, BK Bornholm was a superstructure between the women's football departments of Hasle IF, Nexø BK, Rønne IK, Svaneke IK, IK Viking, Østerlars BK, Østermarie IF and Aakirkeby IF. It was dissolved after the 2020 fall season.)	1	1	1978	1978	Inactive	Bornholm	
Nordsjælland (Note: The women's football department at Farum BK was established in 1994. In February 2020, the administration of the senior women's squad was handed over to the club's professional branch and the team was renamed FC Nordsjælland.)	8	7	2018–19	—	A-Liga	Zealand	
Nykøbing FC (Note: Founded in July 2016, NFC/VIF [sic] is a superstructure at senior level between the women's football departments of Nykøbing FC and Vordingborg IF.)	1	—	2013–14	2013–14	Denmark Series	Lolland-Falster	
Næsby BK	7	—	2014–15	2019–20	Inactive	Funen	.
Næstved HG	5	—	2021–22	—	B-Liga	Zealand	
Næstved IF (Note: The women's football department at Næstved IF was established in 197?. The club have not fielded a senior women's 11-a-side squad since the 199? season, reintroducing it shortly from 2013 to 2017.)	7	7	1977	1986	Inactive	Zealand	
Nørre Aaby IK (Note: The women's football department at Nørre Aaby IK was established in 19??. The club withdrew their senior women's 11-a-side squad from the 1995 season, reintroducing it for the 2013 spring, before being left without a team after the 2016 spring season.)	1	1	1980	1980	Inactive	Funen	
Odense Boldklub Q (Note: The women's football department at Odense BK was established in the spring of 1971, and was detached from the club at the end of the 2015–16 season. In March 2016, the women's elite department, OB Kvinde Elite, was refounded as a separate association football club named Odense Q, assuming the league license beginning from the 2016–17 season. At the same time Team Odense Q was formed as a co-operation at youth level between Odense Q, BK Marienlyst and Tarup-Paarup IF.)	37	32	1990	—	A-Liga	Funen	
OB Q II (Note: OB Q reserve team.)	2	—	2024–25	—	C-Liga	Funen	
G&IF Orient (Note: G&IF Orient was founded in 1941 through a merger between BK Orient and Islev GF. Women's association football was admitted in 1970, but ceased to exist in 1977. It was later reintroduced at youth level, but a women's senior 11-a-side squad have not been fielded.)	5	5	1975	1979	Inactive	Zealand	
Raklev G&IF (Note: Raklev-Kalundborg Kvindefodbold (or RGI-KGB Kvindefodbold) was a superstructure between the senior women's football departments of Raklev G&IF and Kalundborg GF&BK that was founded in January 2018 and dissolved in July 2020. Raklev-Kalundborg Pigefodbold is a superstructure between the same two clubs founded in July 2019, originally at youth level, but have fielded a senior women's 11-a-side squad since the 2021 spring season. The two clubs have previously had a co-operation at men's and women's youth level named Kalundborg Alliancen (1997–201?), which at one point involved Røsnæs G&IF.)	6	—	2002–03	2014–15	Inactive	Zealand	
Randers Q	1	—	2025–26	—	C-Liga	Jutland	
Ribe BK (Note: Re-founded in month? 1917 as Ribe BK&GF, the name was changed to Ribe BK in October 1993 due to Nørremarkens BK being merged into the club. The women's department was established in November 1970. In 1985, a co-operation was formed with Jernved IF's women under the name Ribe-Jernved, which lasted until 1987, when the women's senior team was dissolved.)	6	6	1975	1980	Jutland Series	Jutland	
Ringsted IF (Note: Founded in 1973 as a subdivision to the sports club Ringsted IF, known under the name of Ringsted IFs Damefodboldafdeling or simply Ringsted Damefodbold, the independent women's department changed its name to Ringsted Pigefodbold in 2018.)	16	13	1975	2001	Inactive	Zealand	
Roerslev IF (Note: Founded in 199?, Krogsbølle-Roerslev FK is a merger between Krogsbølle G&IF and Roerslev IF.)	1	1	1976	1976	Defunct	Funen	.
Romalt IF (Note: Now Randers Q reserve team.)	2	—	2019–20	2020–21	Jutland Series 1	Jutland	
Roskilde BK (Note: The women's football department at Roskilde BK was established in 1971. The RB 1906 senior women's 11-a-side squad was dissolved following the 2000 season in the regional top-flight league (Dame-Sjællandsserien), reintroduced for five seasons between 2006 and 2010, but have since not been fielding by the club.)	4	4	1976	1987	Inactive	Zealand	
BK Rødovre (Note: The women's association football department of BK Rødovre was established in 1960. Half way through the 1999–2000 season, BK Rødovre withdrew its senior team from the top-flight league, and had it reinstated in the regional bottom division for the 2000 season. The women's department was dissolved after the 2016–17 season, only to be re-established in the fall of 2018, fielding a senior 11-a-side squad from the spring of 2019.)	28	26	1975	2015–16	Denmark Series	Copenhagen	
Silkeborg Q	1	—	2025–26	—	C-Liga	Jutland	
Skive IK	1	1	1979	1979	Jutland Series	Jutland	
BK Skjold	11	4	2002	2011–12	Denmark Series	Copenhagen	
IF Skjold Birkerød	4	—	2013–14	2017–18	Zealand Series 1	Zealand	
IK Skovbakken (Note: Founded in July 2016, VSK Aarhus was originally a merger between the men's football department of IK Skovbakken Fodbold and the women's and men's football departments of Vejlby IK. In July 2017, the women's football department of IK Skovbakken Fodbold also merged. The founding clubs' association football departments ceased to exist.)	15	15	2001–02	2016–17	Defunct	Jutland	
Skovlunde IF	31	26	1975	2009–10	Defunct	Zealand	
Skårup IF (Note: The women's football department at Skårup IF was established in 1970. The club last fielded their own senior women's 11-a-side squad in the 2004 fall season.) (Note: In January 2005, Team Sydfyn was formed as a superstructure by the women's departments of BK Stjernen Svendborg, Svendborg fB and Skårup IF, becoming the parent clubs' joint first team. Skårup IF withdrew from the co-operation in the fall of 2007. The superstructure was dissolved in June 2009.)	1	—	2003–04	2003–04	Inactive	Funen	
Solrød FC	5	—	2020–21	2024–25	Inactive	Zealand	
Stensballe IK (Note: Founded in January 2017, Hatting/Torsted/Stensballe IK is a superstructure at youth level between the women's football department of Hatting-Torsted Fodbold and Stensballe IK, which was later? expanded to include senior women's 11-a-side football. Stensballe has fielded its own team since the 2023–24 season.)	2	—	1998	2015–16	Jutland Series	Jutland	
BK Stjernen (Note: The women's association football department of BK Stjernen Svendborg was established in 1968 at the club's foundation. BK Stjernen did not reinstate their own senior women's 11-a-side squad following the dissolution of Team Sydfyn and closed its women's department in 2014.)	12	11	1975	1996	Inactive	Funen	
Sundby BK	24	9	1975	—	C-Liga	Copenhagen	
Svaneke BK (Note: The women's football department at Svaneke BK was established in 1973. In the late 1990s/early 2000s?, Svaneke BK had co-operation with Poulsker IF, named Svaneke-Poulsker?.) (Note: Founded in month? 2008, Svaneke IK is a merger between Svaneke BK and Svaneke Ibsker G&IF. The founding clubs ceased to exist as entities.)	1	1	1980	1980	Defunct	Bornholm	
Svogerslev	1	—	2025–26	—	C-Liga	Zealand	.
Sydmors IF (Note: The women's football department at Sydmors IF was established in 19??. The club have not fielded their own senior women's 11-a-side squad since 2005.) (Note: FC Mors was a superstructure formed ahead of the 2006 spring season between the women's football departments of Sydmors IF, Nykøbing Mors IF and a couple of clubs from Nordvestmors. The co-operation was renamed Sydvestmors in the summer of 2012, now also encompassing senior men's football. Following the 2015 fall season, the co-operation did not include a senior women's 11-a-side squad.)	11	10	1983	1993	Jutland Series 2	Jutland	
BK Syd-Vest (Note: The women's football department of BK Syd-Vest fielded a senior 11-a-side team in competitions held by the Copenhagen FA between 1972 and 1983, while the men's football department were members of the DAI. In January 2005, BK Syd-Vest merged with BK Alfa 75 to become FC Sydhavnen.)	1	1	1978	1978	Defunct	Zealand (1972); Copenhagen (1972–1983)	
Sønderborg BK (Note: Founded in October 1919 as Sønderborg BK, the name was changed to Sønderborg-Ulkebøl BK (SUB) in 1992 due to the football department of Ulkebøl I&UF (founded 1909) being merged into the club. In November 2017, the name was changed to SUB Sønderborg Inter due to Sønderborg Inter (founded 2009) being merged into the club. In October 2019, the name was changed back to Sønderborg BK. The women's department of Sønderborg BK was established in 1970, and last fielded their own senior women's 11-a-side squad in the 2005 fall season.) (Note: Team Als was originally a youth superstructure formed in 2002? between the women's football departments of SUB Sønderborg, Hørup U&IF?, Lysabild S&GF? and Midtals IF? — FK BNS would join in October 2011. It was dissolved in 2013?. The superstructure fielded a senior women's 11-a-side squad from the 2006? spring season until it was withdrawn ahead of the 2011 spring season.)	3	3	1982	1984	Inactive	Jutland	
SønderjyskE (Note: Founded in January 2004, SønderjyskE Damefodbold was a superstructure of the women's elite team of Vojens B&IK, becoming part of Sønderjysk Elitesport. At the same time, HV 04 was established as a superstructure between the women's football department of Vojens B&IK and Haderslev FK, becoming the reserve and youth teams of SønderjyskE. Both superstructures aligned their names to SønderjyskE Kvindefodbold in 2007. Vojens B&IK withdrew following the 2008–09 season, handing over the license for the women's elite team to Haderslev FK and administratively separating the team from the umbrella organisation. Haderslev FK's co-operation with SønderjyskE ended, when the elite team was relegated from the bottom tier of the Danish Women's Football League in the 2017–18 season.)	15	4	2003–04	2017–18	Defunct	Jutland	
Thisted FC (Note: FC Thy-Thisted Q reserves.) (Note: The women's football department at Thisted IK was re-established in 1984 following years of inactivity. In January 1989, the women's and men's association football sections of the sports club was reorganised as a separate club under the name Thisted FC. The club last fielded their own senior women's 11-a-side squad in the 2016–17 season.) (Note: Founded in January 2014, FC Thy Piger is a superstructure at youth level between the women's departments of IF Nordthy, Nors BK, Koldby-Hørdum IF, Thisted FC, Frøstrup Hannæs IF (joined 2005?) and Sjørring BK (joined January 2021). In July 2017 the co-operation was expanded to include women's senior 11-a-side squads playing under the name FC Thy-Thisted Q.)	8	—	2000	2023–24	Jutland Series 1	Jutland	
FC Thy-Thisted Q	9	6	2017–18	—	B-Liga	Jutland	
tst/Sabro (Note: Founded in month? 2001, tst/Sabro [sic] was originally a superstructure at youth level between the women's departments of IF tst (True-Skjoldhøj-Tilst) and Sabro IF. In the spring of 2003, the co-operation was expanded to include senior women's 11-a-side. The superstructure was dissolved after the 2012 fall season.)	1	—	2005–06	2005–06	Defunct	Jutland	
Tuse IF (Note: Tuse IF's women's association football department was established in the early 1970s. Tuse IF has not fielded a senior women's 11-a-side squad since the 1980s/1990s, only reintroducing it shortly for the 2016 and 2020 (fall) seasons.)	1	1	1975	1975	Zealand Series	Zealand	
Tved BK (Note: Tved BK's women's association football department was established before or in 1970. Tved BK has not fielded a senior women's 11-a-side squad since the 2020 fall season, and has not fielded 11-a-side team on several previous occasions.)	1	1	1975	1975	Inactive	Funen	.
Tårnby BK	1	—	2007–08	2007–08	Defunct	Copenhagen	
Tåstrup B 70 (Note: Founded in January 2006, Taastrup FC is a merger between the men's and women's football departments of Tåstrup B 70 and Taastrup IK 90 with the founding clubs ceasing to exist as entities. The senior women's team of Tåstrup B 70 played the remaining part of the 2005–06 season under the previous banner. Taastrup FC withdrew their senior women's team from the second half of the 2003–04 top-flight season.)	1	—	2005–06	2005–06	Defunct	Zealand	
Taastrup FC	8	3	2006–07	2013–14	Inactive	Zealand	
Uhre G&IF (Note: The women's association football department of Uhre G&IF was established in the late 1960s. Uhre G&IF have not fielded their own senior women's 11-a-side squad since the 1998 season.)	5	5	1979	1984	Inactive	Jutland	
Varde IF (Note: Esbjerg fB reserves.)	32	9	1989	2024–25	Jutland Series 1	Jutland	
Vejlby IK	14	1	2002–03	2015–16	Defunct	Jutland	
Vejle B (Note: Vejle Dame Boldklub (VDB) was founded as a separate women's association football club in December 1971. In 1986, the club was incorporated into Vejle BK, becoming their women's football department.)	35	28	1988	2023–24	Denmark Series	Jutland	
Viborg FF (Note: The women's football department at Viborg FF was established in 1969. The club took over Team Viborg's license from the 2023–24 season onwards.) (Note: Founded in month? 2001, Team Viborg was originally a superstructure between the women's football departments of Viborg FF, Søndermarkens IK and Houlkær IF. Viborg FF And Houlkær IF left the co-operation in July 2011, with Team Viborg becoming a superstructure for Søndermarkens IK. The club withdrew its senior women's 11-a-side squad from the second half of the 2016–17 season. In 2023, Team Viborg achieved promotion to the league and was absorbed into Viborg FF, with Team Viborg serving as its reserve team.)	12	6	1996	–	C-Liga	Jutland	
Team Viborg (Note: Viborg FF reserves.)	6	2	2002	2016–17	Jutland Series	Jutland	
Vildbjerg SF (Note: FCM reserves.)	14	—	2007–08	2023–24	Jutland Series	Jutland	
Virum-Sorgenfri BK (Note: The women's association football department of Virum-Sorgenfri BK was established in 1971. In the years following the relegation from the Kvinde-Danmarksserien in 1992, the women's department experienced a slow decline until a revival occurred in 2008, once again fielding a senior 11-a-side squad in 2019.)	5	5	1975	1984	Zealand Series	Zealand	
Vojens B&IK (Note: The women's football department at Vojens B&IK was established in the early 1977. The club did not field their own senior women's 11-a-side squad between 2004 (spring) and 2012 (spring), only reintroducing it shortly between the 2012 fall and 2014 fall seasons.)	3	—	2001	2003–04	Inactive	Jutland	
Vorup FB	16	9	1976	2015–16	Denmark Series	Jutland	
VSK Aarhus (Note: AGF reserves)	4	3	2016–17	2019–20	Denmark Series	Jutland	
VSK Aarhus (2)	1	—	2017–18	2017–18	Jutland Series	Jutland	
Ølstykke	2	—	2022–23	2024–25	Denmark Series	Zealand	
Østerbro IF	12	—	2014–15	—	B-Liga	Copenhagen	
Aarby G&IF (Note: The women's football department at Aarby G&IF was established in 1972. The senior 11-a-side squad was discontinued in the late 1980s?, only to be re-established ahead of the 1994 season. The club have not fielded a senior women's 11-a-side squad since at least the 2002? season.)	2	2	1980	1981	Inactive	Zealand	
Aalborg BK	17	7	1975	—	B-Liga	Jutland	
Aalborg Freja	10	—	2006–07	—	C-Liga	Jutland	
Aarhus GF	6	6	2020–21	—	A-Liga	Jutland	
Aarhus 1900	4	—	2018–19	2021–22	Denmark Series	Jutland	
