= 1977 Danish Ladies Football Tournament =

A-Liga
- Season: 1977
- Dates: April 1977 – October 1977
- Champions: BK Femina; 2nd title
- Runner up: Kolding B
- Relegated: (E) (E) (E) (W) (W) (W)
- Matches: 38

The 1977 Danish Ladies Football Tournament was the 3rd season of the top-flight of the Danish Women's Football League. BK Femina won their second league title, beating Kolding B in the two-legged final.

== Format ==
The league was contested by 20 teams in two groups of 10 playing double round-robin (home and away) matches, with the two winners of each group facing off in a two-legged finale to determine the winner.

== Teams ==
=== Changes ===
LEAGUE ENTRIES	LEAGUE EXITS
▲ from 1976 Regional Denmark Series (Note: The second tier at this time was the non-league local series, ie. Funen Series, Jutland Series, Zealand Series, which today are the fifth tier in the pyramid.)	▼ to 1977 Regional Denmark Series
WEST: Herning; Holstebro EAST: Frederiksberg; Herrested; Næstved	WEST: Vorup; Roerslev; AaB EAST: Mariendal; B 1921; Roskilde

=== Stadiums and locations ===
Locations of the 1976 Danish Ladies Football Tournament teams.

Team	Location	Stadium	Capacity
B 1909	Odense		
B52/Aalborg	Aalborg		
BK Femina	Gladsaxe	Gladsaxe Stadium	13,800
Fortuna Hjørring	Hjørring	Hjørring Stadium	7,500
HEI	Aarhus		
Kolding B	Kolding		
Orient	Islev		
Ribe	Ribe		
Ringsted	Ringsted		
Rødovre	Rødovre		
Skovlunde	Skovlunde		
BK Stjernen	Svendborg	Østbyens Stadium	350
Sundby	Amager		
Virum-Sorgenfri	Virum		

=== Personnel and kits ===
Team	Manager	Captain	Kit
B 1909	(Denmark)	(Denmark)	(Denmark)
B52/Aalborg FC	(Denmark)	(Denmark)	(Denmark)
Femina	(Denmark)	(Denmark)	(Denmark)
Fortuna	(Denmark) John Robert Larsen	(Denmark)	(Denmark)
HEI	(Denmark)	(Denmark)	(Denmark)
Kolding B	(Denmark)	(Denmark)	(Denmark)
Orient	(Denmark)	(Denmark)	(Denmark)
Ribe	(Denmark) Jørgen Berg Nielsen	(Denmark)	(Denmark)
Ringsted	(Denmark)	(Denmark)	(Denmark)
Roskilde	(Denmark)	(Denmark)	(Denmark)
Rødovre	(Denmark)	(Denmark)	(Denmark)
Skovlunde	(Denmark)	(Denmark)	(Denmark)
Stjernen	(Denmark)	(Denmark)	(Denmark)
Sundby	(Denmark)	(Denmark)	(Denmark)
Virum-Sorgenfri	(Denmark)	(Denmark)	(Denmark)
