= 1976 Danish Ladies Football Tournament =

A-Liga
- Season: 1976
- Dates: April 1976 – October 1976
- Champions: Ribe; 1st league title (Note: A championship for winners of the six regional leagues were held in 1973 and 1974 before the nationwide league was established in 1975.)
- Runner up: BK Femina
- Relegated: Mariendal (E); B 1921 (E); Roskilde (E); Vorup (W); Roerslev (W); AaB (W)
- Matches: 38

The 1976 Danish Ladies Football Tournament was the 2nd season of the top-flight of the Danish Women's Football League. Ribe won their first league title, beating defending champions BK Femina in the two-legged final.

== Format ==
The league was contested by 20 teams in two groups of 10 playing double round-robin (home and away) matches, with the two winners of each group facing off in a two-legged finale to determine the winner.

== Teams ==
=== Changes ===
LEAGUE ENTRIES	LEAGUE EXITS
▲ from 1975 Regional Denmark Series (Note: The second tier at this time was the non-league local series, ie. Funen Series, Jutland Series, Zealand Series, which today are the fifth tier in the pyramid.)	▼ to 1976 Regional Denmark Series
WEST: HEI; Vorup; Roerslev EAST: B 1921; Mariendal; Roskilde	WEST: Brande; Tved; Billum EAST: Bispebjerg BK; Nakskov; Tuse

=== Stadiums and locations ===
Locations of the 1976 Danish Ladies Football Tournament teams.

Team	Location	Stadium	Capacity
B 1909	Odense		
B 1921	Nykøbing		
B52/Aalborg FC	Aalborg		
BK Femina	Gladsaxe	Gladsaxe Stadium	13,800
Fortuna Hjørring	Hjørring	Hjørring Stadium	7,500
HEI	Aarhus		
Kolding B	Kolding		
Mariendal	Frederiksberg		
Orient	Islev		
Ribe	Ribe		
Ringsted	Ringsted		
Roerslev	Roerslev		
Roskilde	Roskilde		
Rødovre	Rødovre		
Skovlunde	Skovlunde		
BK Stjernen	Svendborg	Østbyens Stadium	350
Sundby	Amager		
Virum-Sorgenfri	Virum		
Vorup	Vorup		
AaB	Aalborg		

=== Personnel and kits ===
Team	Manager	Captain	Kit
B 1909	(Denmark)	(Denmark)	(Denmark)
B 1921	(Denmark)	(Denmark)	(Denmark)
B52/Aalborg FC	(Denmark)	(Denmark)	(Denmark)
Femina	(Denmark)	(Denmark)	(Denmark)
Fortuna	(Denmark) John Robert Larsen	(Denmark)	(Denmark)
HEI	(Denmark)	(Denmark)	(Denmark)
Kolding B	(Denmark)	(Denmark)	(Denmark)
Mariendal	(Denmark)	(Denmark)	(Denmark)
Orient	(Denmark)	(Denmark)	(Denmark)
Ribe	(Denmark) Jørgen Berg Nielsen	(Denmark)	(Denmark)
Ringsted	(Denmark)	(Denmark)	(Denmark)
Roerslev	(Denmark)	(Denmark) Inge Knudsen	(Denmark)
Roskilde	(Denmark)	(Denmark)	(Denmark)
Rødovre	(Denmark)	(Denmark)	(Denmark)
Skovlunde	(Denmark)	(Denmark)	(Denmark)
Stjernen	(Denmark)	(Denmark)	(Denmark)
Sundby	(Denmark)	(Denmark)	(Denmark)
Virum-Sorgenfri	(Denmark)	(Denmark)	(Denmark)
Vorup	(Denmark)	(Denmark)	(Denmark)
AaB	(Denmark) Esben Elbæk	(Denmark)	(Denmark)

== East ==
=== Season ===
Pos	Team	Pld	W	D	L	GF	GA	GD	Pts	Qualification
1	BK Femina	0	0	0	0	48	4	+44	0	Final
2	Skovlunde	0	0	0	0	38	5	+33	0	
3	Ringsted	0	0	0	0	52	12	+40	0	
4	Sundby	0	0	0	0	27	19	+8	0	
5	Orient	0	0	0	0	22	26	−4	0	
6	Virum-Sorgenfri	0	0	0	0	30	29	+1	0	
7	Rødovre	0	0	0	0	12	23	−11	0	
8	Mariendal	0	0	0	0	10	44	−34	0	Relegated to 1977 Denmark Series
9	B 1921	0	0	0	0	7	48	−41	0	Relegated to 1977 Denmark Series
10	Roskilde	0	0	0	0	5	41	−36	0	Relegated to 1977 Denmark Series

Rules for classification: 1) Points; 2) Goal difference; 3) Goals scored; 4) Away goals scored; 5) Play-off (played on neutral ground if determining teams for different rounds); 6) Draw.

== West ==
=== Season ===
Pos	Team	Pld	W	D	L	GF	GA	GD	Pts	Qualification
1	Ribe	12	10	2	0	54	6	+48	22	Final
2	BK Stjernen	11	7	1	3	69	10	+59	15	
3	Kolding	13	10	2	1	36	11	+25	22	
4	B52/Aalborg FC	12	6	3	3	37	26	+11	15	
5	Fortuna Hjørring	18	9	0	9	35	33	+2	18	
6	HEI	11	3	1	7	20	38	−18	7	
7	B 1909	10	3	2	5	34	42	−8	8	
8	Vorup	11	2	2	7	24	49	−25	6	Relegated to 1977 Denmark Series
9	Roerslev	18	2	2	14	12	41	−29	6	Relegated to 1977 Denmark Series
10	AaB	12	0	1	11	10	63	−53	1	Relegated to 1977 Denmark Series

Source: "Fortuna Hjørring Scrapbog 1976". Issuu (in Danish). p. 12.
Rules for classification: 1) Points; 2) Goal difference; 3) Goals scored; 4) Away goals scored; 5) Play-off (played on neutral ground if determining teams for different rounds); 6) Draw.

=== Results ===
Home \ Away	B09	B52	FOR	HEI	KOL	RIB	RSV	STJ	VOR	AAB
B 1909		2–3	2–3	1–0		0–2	6–3			
B52/Aalborg FC	2–2		1–2	1–1		0–2	3–0	2–1		
Fortuna Hjørring	3–2	1–2		0–1	2–4	0–5	2–1	1–0	5–1	5–1
HEI			2–0		0–2	0–3		0–3		
Kolding	2–0	3–0	1–0	1–0		1–1		1–0		2–0
Ribe		2–0	3–0				3–0	1–1	5–1	2–0
Roerslev	1–1		0–1	0–3	0–1					2–1
BK Stjernen			3–0	5–0	1–0				6–0	10–0
Vorup		1–2	3–4	2–1	2–2	0–7		0–3		4–1
AaB	0–2	1–6	0–7		0–2		0–2		1–1	

Source: "Fortuna Hjørring Scrapbog 1976", Vendsyssel Tidende (in Danish)
Legend: Blue = home team win; Yellow = draw; Red = away team win.

== Final ==
Team 1	Agg.	Team 2	1st leg	2nd leg
Ribe	3–0	BK Femina	3–0	0–0

2 November 1975

Ribe BK	3–0	BK Femina

Ribe Stadium, Ribe
9 November 1975

BK Femina	0–0	Ribe BK

Gladsaxe Stadium, Gladsaxe

Ribe won the title 3–0 on aggregate.

== Sources ==
- "arkiv.dk | Ribe Kvindefodboldhold ved modtagelse på Det gamle Rådhus efter at have vundet DM, 1970-erne". arkiv.azurewebsites.net (in Danish).
- Lindquist Bentsen, Bjarne (2023-12-23). "Birte og Bodil var med til at vinde det første DM-guld og kritiserer behandlingen af kvinder skarpt: - De skal spille i Parken som mændene". Jydske Vestkysten (in Danish).
- "Dameguld og sammenhold blandt Ribe BKs højdepunkter". ugeavisen.dk (in Danish). 2017-06-13. Archived from the original on 2024-11-27.
