= Maren Barsballe =

Danish footballer (born 1949)

Personal information
- Date of birth: 3 December 1949 (age 76)
- Position: Defender

Senior career*
Years	Team	Apps	(Gls)
- Ribe

International career
1974–1979	Denmark	20	(2)
- * Club domestic league appearances and goals

Maren Barsballe is a Danish former footballer who played as a defender for A-Liga club Ribe and the Denmark women's national football team. Barsballe won the unofficial 1979 Euros with Denmark.

== Club career ==
Barsballe won the inaugural 1973 Danish Football Championship, the first official iteration of a football league in Denmark, where the regional winners faced off in a knockout competition, with the two top teams meeting in a two-legged final. Ribe won both championships in 1973 and 1974.

== International career ==
Barsballe made her debut on the national team in the 27 July 1974 match against Sweden. She was made captain in 1975 and captained Denmark for four years until 1979.
