= Danish Women's Football League =

- Organising body: Danish Football Association
- Founded: 1974; 52 years ago
- Country: Denmark
- Confederation: UEFA
- Divisions: A-Liga; B-Liga; C-Liga
- Number of clubs: 30
- Level on pyramid: 1–3
- Relegation to: Denmark Series
- Domestic cup: Danish Cup
- Current champions: HB Køge (2025–26)
- Most championships: Brøndby; Fortuna Hjørring; (12 each)
- Broadcaster: TV 2

The Danish Women's Football League, known as the Danish Women's Football Tournament (Danmarksturneringen i kvindefodbold, sometimes abbreviated as Kvinde-DM), is a league of semi-professional football clubs in Denmark. The league is divided into three tiers - A-Liga, B-Liga, and C-Liga, with promotion and relegation between the league tiers. A-Liga fields 10 teams (6 for the title race in the spring), B-Liga fields 8 teams, while C-Liga is divided into two groups of 6 clubs each.

It was founded by the Danish Football Association in 1975, following the discontinuation of the end-of-season women's national championship knock-out tournament format after two editions (1973–1974). The 1975 Danish Ladies Football Tournament was the first season, fielding twenty teams divided geographically in two groups of ten with the two group winners progressing to a national championship final. The teams had qualified through regional football league championships..

A combined nationwide first division was introduced in 1981, a second division was implemented in 1993 and a third division was added in 2021. Since the nationwide division was introduced in 1981, clubs finishing last in the league have been relegated to the non-league fourth tier, the Danish Women's Series.

Initially formed as an amateur tournament, professionalism was legalised in July 1997, albeit restricted to the league, with the first semi-professional player contracts in Danish women's football being signed by Fortuna Hjørring og Frederiksberg BK.

== History ==
Since February 1972, women's football in Denmark has been governed by the Danish Football Association (DBU) and sanctioned by UEFA, with the national title contested through various competition formats. The inaugural official national women's football tournament took place in the 1973 season, featuring regional league winners advancing to a knockout stage, where the play-off winners were crowned champions. A nation league system was introduced in 1975 with west and east divisions, with the top team from each group progressing for a grand final. A single nationwide top division was established in 1981, awarding the championship to the team finishing atop the league standings by the end of the season.

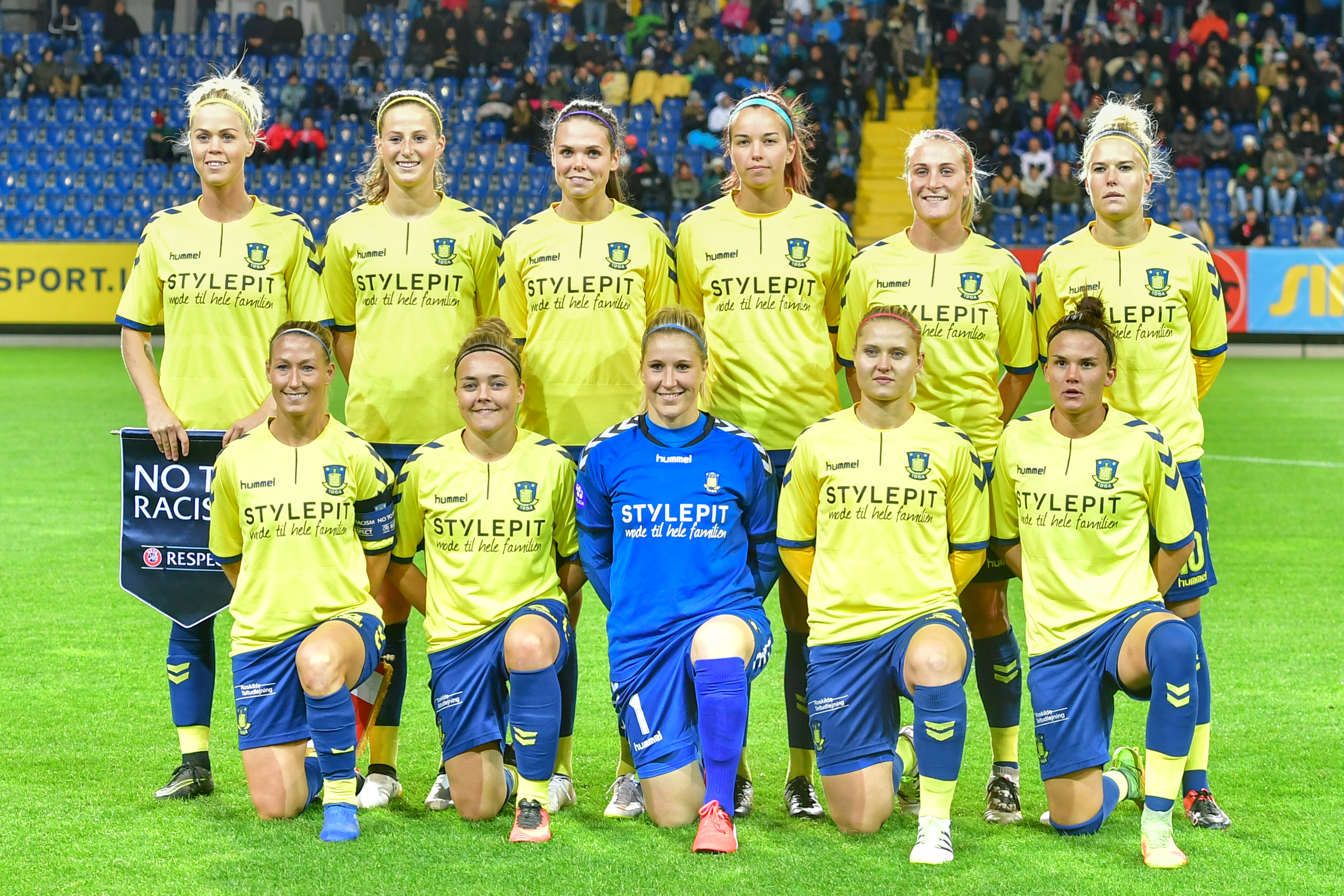
Brøndby has won the league a record 12 times, tied only with Fortuna Hjørring, and have won the double 8 times.

Fortuna Hjørring and Brøndby hold the record for most championships, having each secured the title on twelve occasions. Hjortshøj-Egaa IF enjoyed the longest winning streak in the 1980s, clinching six consecutive league championships from 1986 to 1992, a record matched only by Brøndby in the 2000s as they won the league title from 2002 to 2003 to 2007–08. In addition, Brøndby have achieved the double, winning both the league and the cup, a record eight times, three more than archrivals Fortuna Hjørring's five, and FC Nordsjælland and HB Køge's single double. The defending champions are HB Køge, winning the 2025–26 league title for the fourth time in the club's history.

Lis Westberg Pedersen made history as the first female head coach in 1980, guiding BK Femina to the eighth edition of the championship in her first season. Henriette Jensen of Hjortshøj-Egaa IF became the first woman to win a championship as both a footballer and head coach, sharing the position with colleague Ove Sass Hansen. With four national championship each, Peer Lisdorf (3x Brøndby IF, 1x HB Køge) and Peer Danefeld (2x B 1909, 1x Odense BK, 1x Brøndby IF) have won the most titles as head coach.

The weekly magazine Femina, regional organisations, various clubs, and the Dansk Kvinde Fodbold Union (DKFU) held national indoor and outdoor football tournaments for women's teams throughout the 1960s, with the last competitions continuing until early 1972. Neither the Danish FA (DBU) nor the National Olympic Committee and Sports Confederation of Denmark (DIF) recognise any women's national championship tournaments held before February 1972. Therefore, these indoor and outdoor senior women's records are not listed here.

=== Founding and first years (1972–1974) ===
Denmark's first outdoor women's association football tournament took place in the spring of 1960, organised by weekly magazine Femina. The tournament featured thirty teams from across the country, playing by a modified set of rules created and revised by the magazine. The turnout exceeded expectations and the original format of an initial group stage followed by a knockout phase was changed to a knockout competition with an initial qualifying phase of three rounds and a championship play-off consisting of four teams, which was held on 17 July 1960 at Valby Idrætspark. BK Femina won the final against a team from Køge (Note: Weber (2004) mentions Køge BK as a participant in Femina's 1960 outdoor cup tournament, but the club does not recognise this. The women's application for admission to the club was denied, and a women's football department was not established until 1972.) by a score of 4–1. The followings years saw multiple indoor and outdoor football tournaments arranged, however women's football experienced decreasing interest in the mid-1960s. Despite this, there was an incremental establishing of new teams in the late 1960s, primarily within private companies, but not warranting a league formation – until 1970, the number of clubs with women's football teams did not exceed ten. BK Femina were the leading Danish women's team of the era, winning more or less every indoor and outdoor championship organised by the Dansk Kvinde Fodbold Union (DKFU). In the spring of 1971, the DKFU organised one last national outdoor football tournament with over 200 teams, where Skovlunde IF faced Billum IF in the championship final, securing a 3–0 victory.

Encouraged by both FIFA and UEFA, a successful vote at the meeting of the Board of Representatives of the Danish Football Association (DBU) on 27 February 1972 meant that women's football would now officially be acknowledged and competitions coordinated under the auspices of the national association. The first year was considered an adaptation year in which the regional football associations were to set up various committees to plan the tournaments. The qualifying regional tournaments could not meet the deadline of 1 November for having the regional champions ready for the national playoffs, and the national championship was not concluded in 1972.

The first official Danish women's national football championship was held the following year as a single-elimination tournament, where the winners of the six regional football associations' top-flight leagues, namely Nexø BK (Bornholm FA champions), BK Rødovre (Copenhagen FA champions), BK Stjernen Svendborg (Funen FA champions), Ribe BK&GF (Jutland FA champions), B 1921 (Lolland-Falster FA champions) and Skovlunde IF (Zealand FA champions), faced each other for a spot in the inaugural one-legged championship final. Ribe BK&GF became the inaugural winners of the 1973 season by winning 1–0 against BK Stjernen Svendborg in the final held at Høje Bøge Stadium, Svendborg. Besides the championship trophy from the Danish FA, additional championship plaques from the National Olympic Committee and Sports Confederation of Denmark (DIF) were handed to each participant. This initial format lasted for another season (1974), with a repeat of the same finalists and winners. Regional qualifiers were implemented to decide, which twenty teams would take part in the new installation of the 1975 championship.

=== Two divisions in one tier (1975–1980) ===
A national league system with the Danish Women's Football Tournament (Danmarksturneringen i kvindefodbold, then Danmarksturneringen i damefodbold) at the top was incepted in 1975, consisting of a nationwide first division evenly divided geographically into two groups, clubs situated east and west of the Great Belt, establishing a promotion and relegation system with the regional top-flight leagues. The two winners of each group at the end of the regular season qualified for a spot in the two-legged championship final. The winners of the third edition were BK Femina, the then oldest existing pure women's association football club, who entered the final match by finishing at the top of the east group. BK Femina defeated Ribe BK&GF 1–0 away at Ribe Stadium and 4–0 at home at Gladsaxe Idrætspark. For six seasons (1973–1980), BK Femina regularly reached the final, securing the national title on three occasions, while Ribe BK&GF won the championship three times. For economic reasons, the Danish FA wanted to postpone the implementation of a single nationwide top-flight league, as the travelling expenses would double. After winning their fifth championship in 1979, the tournament rules declared that Ribe BK&GF could keep the original trophy permanently. In a profession dominated by male coaches, Lis Westberg Pedersen became the female head coach to manage a top-flight league team, guiding BK Femina to a championship title in the 1980 season.

=== Single division and HEI dominance (1981–1992) ===
In 1981, the first single national women's tier-one league, named Dame 1. division, began to play using a double round-robin system with no playoffs, where the top team at the end of the season was crowned the annual national champions of Danish women's football. B 1909 won the ninth edition as the first team based at Funen, finishing five points ahead of BK Femina. Throughout the 1980s and early 1990s, the women's football championship was dominated by Hjortshøj-Egaa IF and B 1909, who shared the national titles from 1981 to 1993, with Hjortshøj-Egaa IF securing six consecutive championships between 1986 and 1991. The format changed to a two-stage season in 1990, predating the two-stage format introduced to the Danish Superliga in the 1991–92 season. Teams played a single round-robin tournament in the first stage, after which points were awarded based on positions and goal scores were reset to zero. The top six and bottom six teams then playing another single round-robin for a total of 21 games to determine the champions and relegated clubs respectively. Henriette Jensen became the first woman to win the championship title as both a football player (defender) and a head coach, having already won five league titles (1982, 1984, 1986, 1987, and 1988) and one title as an assistant coach (1989) with the top-flight club Hjortshøj-Egaa IF, when she in January 1990 transitioned to a coaching position alongside Ove Sass Hansen,, securing the league title in her first and second year.

=== The Elite Division and a second league tier (1993–1999) ===
In 1993, a nationwide second division was formed, with the existing top-flight league rebranded as Elitedivisionen. The number of teams was reduced from twelve to eight, and the two-stage format underwent its first of several revisions. Fortuna Hjørring claimed the first double by winning the 1994–95 cup and 1995 league. The 1996 season lasted just six months as the tournament schedule was changed from spring-autumn to autumn-spring. Initially formed as an amateur tournament, professionalism was legalised and restricted to the Danmarksturneringen in July 1997, with the first semi-professional player contracts in Danish women's football being signed by Fortuna Hjørring and Frederiksberg BK. The first season (1997–98) as a semi-professional top-flight league was won by Hjortshøj-Egaa IF, whose roster consisted solely of players with amateur status. Fortuna Hjørring secured the 1998–99 title as the first semi-professional club. Odense BK won two seasons around the turn of the millennium in close competition with Hjortshøj-Egaa IF and Fortuna Hjørring, who finished in the top three for ten seasons.

=== 2000–present ===
Between 2001 and 2020, Danish women's football witnessed an uninterrupted power struggle between Fortuna Hjørring and Brøndby IF, with Brøndby IF clinching twelve league titles and finishing runners-up seven times, and the reserve for Fortuna Hjørring. Brøndby IF's dominance included six consecutive championships from 2002 to 2008. HB Køge broke the nineteen-year duopoly in the 2020–21 season by securing the championship in the final round of play, marking their first season at the highest level just three and a half years after continuous promotion from the fifth level. Prior to the 2016–17 season, the top-flight league formally changed its name to Kvindeligaen. The current challenge trophy, the ninth design in the history for the women's championship, was introduced in the 2023–24 season, replacing the previous trophy which became the permanent possession of HB Køge following their three consecutive championships (2020–2023).

== Current member clubs ==
As of the 2026–27 season

=== A-Liga ===
- AGF
- ASA
- Brøndby
- Copenhagen
- Fortuna Hjørring
- HB Køge
- Kolding IF
- Midtjylland
- Nordsjælland
- OB Q

=== B-Liga ===
- B.93
- Esbjerg
- Næstved HG
- Sundby
- Thy-Thisted Q
- Viborg FF
- Østerbro IF
- AaB

=== C-Liga ===
==== Group 1 ====
- BSF
- Damsø
- Fredensborg
- OB Q II (Note: OB Q reserve team.)
- Valby
- Ølstykke

==== Group 2 ====
- Brabrand
- Randers Q
- Silkeborg Q
- Vejle
- VSK Aarhus (Note: AGF reserve team.)
- Aalborg Freja

== See also ==
- List of Danish Women's Football League clubs
