= Statens Pædagogiske Forsøgscenter =

Coordinates: 55°42′19.18″N 12°26′2.21″E

National Innovative Centre (Danish: Statens Pædagogiske Forsøgscenter) was a state school located in Islev, Denmark. The school was established in 1964 by Danish education minister K. Helveg Petersen to develop teaching innovations, and share the results of their work with schools across Denmark. The school had to close in 2007 due to political conflicts. The students were representative selected to reflect a common school class.
