= 1975 Danish Ladies Football Tournament =

A-Liga
- Season: 1975
- Dates: April 1975 – October 1975
- Champions: BK Femina; 1st title
- Runner up: Ribe BK
- Relegated: Bispebjerg BK (E); Nakskov (E); Tuse (E); Brande IF (W); Tved BK (W); Billum IF (W)

The 1975 Danish Ladies Football Tournament was the 1st season of the top-flight of the Danish Women's Football League. BK Femina won the first nationwide league title. This was relegated clubs Billum IF and Tved BK's only season in the top-flight.

== Format ==
The league was contested by 20 teams in two groups of 10 playing double round-robin (home and away) matches, with the two winners of each group facing off in a two-legged finale to determine the winner.

== Teams ==
=== Stadiums and locations ===
Locations of the 1975 Danish Ladies Football Tournament teams.

Team	Location	Stadium	Capacity
B 1909	Odense	Gillested Park	
B52/Aalborg	Aalborg		
Billum	Varde		
Bispebjerg BK	Bispebjerg		
Brande	Brande		
BK Femina	Gladsaxe	Gladsaxe Stadium	13,800
Fortuna Hjørring	Hjørring	Hjørring Stadium	7,500
Kolding B	Kolding		
Nakskov BK	Nakskov		
Orient	Islev		
Ribe	Ribe		
Ringsted	Ringsted		
Rødovre	Rødovre		
Skovlunde IF	Skovlunde		
BK Stjernen	Svendborg		
Sundby BK	Amager		
Tuse	Tuse		
Tved	Svendborg		
Virum-Sorgenfri	Virum		
AaB	Aalborg		

=== Personnel and kits ===
Team	Manager	Captain	Kit
B 1909	(Denmark)	(Denmark)	(Denmark)
B52/Aalborg FC	(Denmark)	(Denmark)	(Denmark)
Billum	(Denmark)	(Denmark)	(Denmark)
Bispebjerg	(Denmark)	(Denmark)	(Denmark)
Brande	(Denmark)	(Denmark)	(Denmark)
Femina	(Denmark)	(Denmark)	(Denmark)
Fortuna	(Denmark) John Robert Larsen	(Denmark)	(Denmark)
Kolding B	(Denmark)	(Denmark)	(Denmark)
Nakskov	(Denmark)	(Denmark)	(Denmark)
Orient	(Denmark)	(Denmark)	(Denmark)
Ribe	(Denmark)	(Denmark)	(Denmark)
Ringsted	(Denmark)	(Denmark)	(Denmark)
Rødovre	(Denmark)	(Denmark)	(Denmark)
Skovlunde	(Denmark)	(Denmark)	(Denmark)
Stjernen	(Denmark)	(Denmark)	(Denmark)
Sundby	(Denmark)	(Denmark)	(Denmark)
Tuse	(Denmark)	(Denmark)	(Denmark)
Tved	(Denmark)	(Denmark)	(Denmark)
Virum-Sorgenfri	(Denmark)	(Denmark)	(Denmark)
AaB	(Denmark) Esben Elbæk	(Denmark)	(Denmark)

== East ==
=== Season ===
Pos	Team	Pld	W	D	L	GF	GA	GD	Pts	Qualification
1	BK Femina	0	0	0	0	0	0	0	0	Final
2	Orient	0	0	0	0	0	0	0	0	
3	Ringsted	0	0	0	0	0	0	0	0	
4	Rødovre	0	0	0	0	0	0	0	0	
5	Skovlunde	0	0	0	0	0	0	0	0	
6	Sundby	0	0	0	0	0	0	0	0	
7	Virum-Sorgenfri	0	0	0	0	0	0	0	0	
8	Bispebjerg	0	0	0	0	0	0	0	0	Relegated to 1976 Denmark Series
9	Nakskov	0	0	0	0	0	0	0	0	Relegated to 1976 Denmark Series
10	Tuse	0	0	0	0	0	0	0	0	Relegated to 1976 Denmark Series

Rules for classification: 1) Points; 2) Goal difference; 3) Goals scored; 4) Away goals scored; 5) Play-off (played on neutral ground if determining teams for different rounds); 6) Draw.

== West ==
=== Season ===
Pos	Team	Pld	W	D	L	GF	GA	GD	Pts	Qualification
1	Ribe	0	0	0	0	66	5	+61	0	Final
2	Kolding	0	0	0	0	54	15	+39	0	
3	Fortuna Hjørring	0	0	0	0	38	28	+10	0	
4	BK Stjernen	0	0	0	0	47	27	+20	0	
5	B 1909	0	0	0	0	41	29	+12	0	
6	AaB	0	0	0	0	34	39	−5	0	
7	B52/Aalborg FC	0	0	0	0	23	30	−7	0	
8	Brande	0	0	0	0	24	44	−20	0	Relegated to 1977 Denmark Series
9	Tved	0	0	0	0	5	69	−64	0	Relegated to 1977 Denmark Series
10	Billum	0	0	0	0	10	56	−46	0	Relegated to 1977 Denmark Series

Source: "Fortuna Hjørring Scrapbog 1975". Issuu (in Danish).
Rules for classification: 1) Points; 2) Goal difference; 3) Goals scored; 4) Away goals scored; 5) Play-off (played on neutral ground if determining teams for different rounds); 6) Draw.

=== Results ===
Home \ Away	B09	B52	BIL	BRA	FOR	KOL	RIB	STJ	TVE	AAB
B 1909										
B52/Aalborg FC										
Billum										
Brande										
Fortuna Hjørring										
Kolding										
Ribe										
BK Stjernen										
Tved										
AaB										

Source: "Fortuna Hjørring Scrapbog 1975"
Legend: Blue = home team win; Yellow = draw; Red = away team win.
