= Lis Lene Nielsen =

Danish footballer (born 1951)

Personal information
- Date of birth: 29 August 1951 (age 75)
- Place of birth: Otterup, Denmark
- Positions: Midfielder; defender

Senior career*
Years	Team	Apps	(Gls)
1971–1973	Skamby Boldklub		
1974–1986	B 1909		

International career
1971–1983	Denmark	9	(5)
Medal record
Women's football
Women's World Cup
Gold medal – first place	1971 Mexico	Team
- * Club domestic league appearances and goals

Lis Lene Nielsen (born 29 August 1951) is a Danish former footballer, athlete, handball player, and badminton player from Otterup. Nielsen played as a midfielder for A-Liga club B 1909 and the Denmark women's national football team. She was the top goalscorer at the unofficial 1971 Women's World Cup which Denmark won.

== Club career ==
Nielsen started her career with local outfit Skamby Boldklub in 1971. This was the club which she represented at the 1971 World Cup. For her achievements in winning gold with Denmark, Nielsen's first club built a statue of her. Nielsen moved to B 1909 in 1974, where she became the top scorer in her first season with 62 goals in 18 matches.

== International career ==
Nielsen won five official caps for the Denmark women's national football team between 1974 and 1983, and made four appearances in the 1971 Women's World Cup in Mexico, in which she scored five goals. Nielsen scored a hat-trick against Argentina in the semi-finals.

== Honours ==
National team

- 1971 Women's World Cup
