= Boldklubben 1909 (women) =

B 1909
- Full name: Boldklubben 1909
- Nicknames: Nierne (The Nines); De Røde (The Reds)
- Founded: 1971; 55 years ago
- Dissolved: 1994
- Ground: Gillested Park
- Capacity: 6,000
- Chairman: Finn Ravn
Home colours

Boldklubben 1909 (commonly known as B 1909) is a football club based in Odense, Denmark. B 1909 was at the top of the Danish Women's Football League for several decades, winning the league in 1981, 1983, 1985, and two consecutive wins in 1992 and 1993. The club has not had a women's department in decades, owing to its financial difficulties which encompass the entire club.

== History ==
The club was founded in 1971 and was part of the top-flight of the Danish Women's Football League from the start, participating in the first year of the league in 1975. The club won its first medals in 1980 with silver following a defeat to BK Femina in the two-legged league finals. The following year B 1909 were victorious against the champions, winning the club its first championship. The club would go on to win the league another four times, as well as another four silver medals. Despite winning the league in 1993, B 1909 went bankrupt in 1994 and handled it by dissolving its women's team. Volunteers have re-established a girls' department of the club.

== Honours ==
Competition	#	Years
A-Liga	5	(gold) 1981, 1983, 1985, 1992, 1993
A-Liga	5	(silver) 1979, 1982, 1984, 1986, 1990

== Players ==
=== Captains ===
Incomplete

Years	Player
	Lis Lene Nielsen

== Managers ==
Incomplete

Years	Name
	Peer Danefeld
	Mogens Rasmussen
	Henning Schmidt

== Seasons ==
Key
(gold) Champions	Promotion
(silver) Silver	Relegation
(bronze) Bronze	Championship Final

Incomplete

Season	Tier	#	W	D	L	F	A	Pts.	Cup
DIVISION WEST (2nd of 2) (Note: The league was originally divided into two groups of 10 teams, representing the east and the west of the country.)									—N/a
1975	1	5th of 10				41	29	21	—N/a
1976	1	7th of 10				34	42	8	—N/a
1977	1								—N/a
1978	1								—N/a
1979	1	2nd of 10				64	16	31	—N/a
1980	1	2nd of 20							—N/a
SINGLE-DIVISION LEAGUE (Note: From the 1981 season onwards, the league was changed to a single division encompassing the 12 best teams from across the country.)									—N/a
1981	1	1st of 12							—N/a
1982	1	2nd of 12							—N/a
1983	1	1st of 12							—N/a
1984	1	2nd of 12							—N/a
1985	1	1st of 12							—N/a
1986	1	2nd of 12							—N/a
1987	1								—N/a
1988	1								—N/a
1989	1								—N/a
1990	1	2nd of 12							—N/a
1991	1								—N/a
1992	1	1st of 12							—N/a
1993	1	1st of 12							
1994	1								

== See also ==
- Boldklubben 1909 (men's team)
