= Lis Westberg Pedersen =

Danish footballer

Lis Pedersen
Personal information
- Full name: Lis Westberg Wedell-Riis
- Birth name: Lis Pedersen
- Date of birth: September–December 1946
- Date of death: 6 September 2017 (aged 70)
- Position: Defender

Senior career*
Years	Team	Apps	(Gls)
- Boldklubben Orient

International career
1971	Denmark		
Medal record
Women's football
Women's World Cup
Gold medal – first place	1971 Mexico	Team
- * Club domestic league appearances and goals

Lis Westberg Wedell-Riis (née Pedersen; 1946–6 September 2017) was a Danish footballer manager and former defender who played for Boldklubben Orient and the Denmark women's national football team.

== Managerial career ==
Westberg made history as the first female Danish head coach in 1980, guiding BK Femina to win the eighth edition of the Danish Championship in her first season. Westberg later worked with future Brentford and Spurs manager Thomas Frank in Frederiksværk.

== Honours ==
National team

- World Cup: 1971
