= Næstved Stadium =

Football stadium in Næstved, Denmark

Coordinates: 55.2231°N 11.7664°E

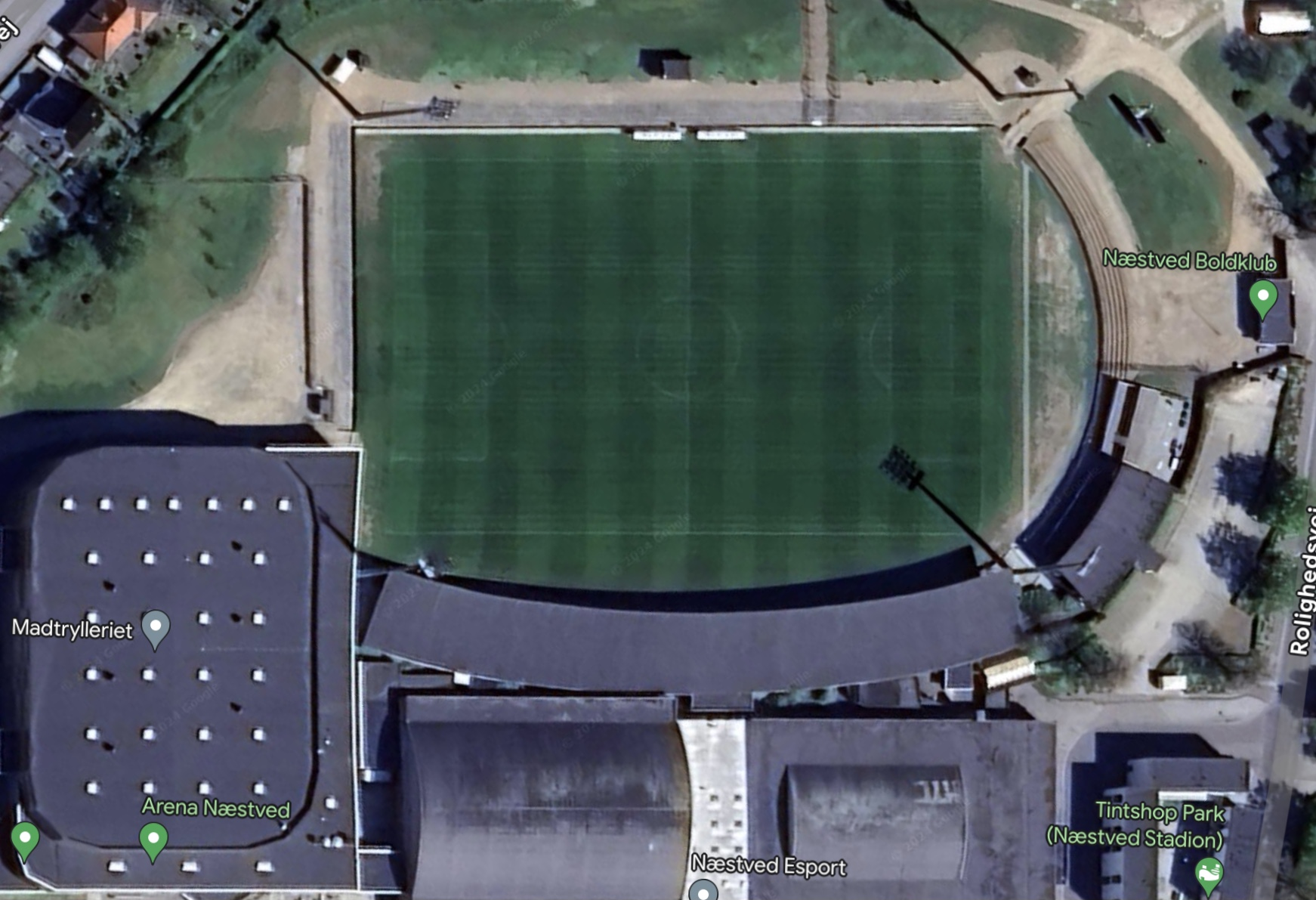
- Interactive map of Næstved Stadium
- Full name: Næstved Stadion
- Owner: Næstved Municipality
- Capacity: 10,000 (2,300 covered seats); 20,000 (1944-2002)
- Executive suites: 1
- Surface: Grass
- Scoreboard: Yes
- Record attendance: 21,504
- Field size: 102 by 65 metres (335 ft × 213 ft) Floodlights 1,000 Lux

Construction
- Opened: 1944
- Renovated: 2002

Tenants
- Næstved BK; Næstved HG

Næstved Stadium (Danish: Næstved Stadion) is a multi-use stadium in Næstved, Denmark. It is known as JHH Park for sponsorship reasons. It is the home stadium of Næstved BK (until 1996 Næstved IF) and Næstved HG. The stadium was previously used as a venue for motorcycle speedway races, often with crowds of around 20,000 or more.

The stadium was opened in 1944 with a capacity of 20,000 spectators. After being renovated in 2002 it now holds 10,000 spectators, including 2,300 covered seats in the main stand.

== History ==
The speedway track built by the Naestved Motor Klub was a 400 metres oval track. It held speedway during two periods, the first between 10 July 1949 and 1955. It returned for an international meeting on 1 July 1982, won by Phil Crump and featured legendary riders such as Ole Olsen, Hans Nielsen and Erik Gundersen.

In 2002, the cinder race track, used for speedway races, around the football field was removed and the pitch moved closer to the main stand. The opposite terrace was rebuilt and moved closer to the field. At the same time the capacity was reduced to around 10,000 - 2,300 of which are covered seats.

== Record attendance ==
The overall record attendance is 21,504 set on September 15, 1950 at an international speedway match.

The record attendance for football is 20,315 spectators, and was set on November 16, 1980 when Næstved IF met Kjøbenhavns Boldklub (KB) in the final and deciding game of the season. With a win Næstved IF would secure the first Danish championship in the club's history. However the visitors scored in the very last minute making the final score 1-1 and thus winning KB their 15th and last ever championship. The club merged with B1903 into FC København in 1992.

Record attendances

Date	Attendance	Arrangement	Description
17.09.1950	21,504	Speedway	International Match
16.11.1980	20,315	Football	Næstved-KB Final match of the season
20.08.1950	18,223	Speedway	International Match
21.08.1949	15,000	Speedway	Scandinavian Match
29.05.1950	15,000	Speedway	International Match
02.06.1952	14,000	Speedway	International Team Match
02.07.1950	12,000	Speedway	International Match
28.08.1988	11,221	Football	Næstved-Vejle Preben Elkjærs comeback
15.07.1951	11,000	Speedway	International Match
29.11.1992	10,981	Football	Næstved-Frem Super League Relegation match
30.11.1958	10,426	Football	Næstved-B93 Second division Promotion match
05.10.1975	10,098	Football	Næstved-Køge First division Top meeting
10.07.1949	10,000	Speedway	First match ever
27.06.1954	10,000	Speedway	Team match England Sweden Denmark
29.03.2002	9,710	Football	Næstved-FCK Cup match quarterfinal
04.06.1972	9,269	Football	Næstved-B1903 First division Top match
16.09.1951	9,000	Speedway	Danish Swedish Team Match
31.10.1971	8,649	Football	Næstved-Fuglebakken Second division Top match
13.08.1972	8,230	Football	Næstved-Vejle First division Top match
03.05.1953	8,000	Speedway	Danish Swedish Team Match
02.08.1953	8,000	Speedway	International Match
07.10.1973	7,885	Football	Næstved-Køge Local Derby
08.11.1981	7,870	Football	Næstved-Vejle Second last round and Næstved was top of the table
08.03.2008	7,324	Fodbold	Næstved-FCK Cup match quarterfinal
09.05.1954	7,000	Speedway	Opening of the season
01.07.1982	7,000	Speedway	With Ole Olsen, Erik Gundersen og Hans Nielsen
