= Sundby Boldklub (women) =

- Short name: Sundby
- Founded: 1960s
- Ground: Kløvermarken Sports Facilities
- Chairman: Bo Hammer
- Coach: Jan Kristensen
- League: B-Liga
- 2025–26: C-Liga, 1st of 6 (promoted)
- Website: Sundby Boldklub

Sundby Boldklub (commonly known as Sundby BK) is a football club based in Amager, Copenhagen. The club plays in the B-Liga, the second tier of the Danish Women's Football League.

== History ==
Sundby was founded in or before 1960 and played unofficial matches with two other clubs, BK Femina and Rødovre BK through the decade. The club also participated in a nationwide tournament in 1960 with 25 other teams from across the country. Sundby was later among the 13 clubs which founded the Danish Women's Football Union in 1970, independent of the Danish Football Association as it denied access to women. Sundby played in the top-flight from the beginning of the league in 1975 to 1980 and, while returning for a few seasons, spent most of the '80s and '90s in non-league. The club returned to the league in 2013, achieving promotion to the second tier and have mostly stayed there since, with a few years in the third tier. In 2026, Sundby won promotion to B-Liga (tier 2), finishing the season at the top of the table.

== Players ==
As of 22 August 2026

Note: Flags indicate national team as defined under FIFA eligibility rules; some limited exceptions apply. Players may hold more than one non-FIFA nationality.

No.	Pos.	Nation	Player
1	GK	DEN	Vicktoria Bjerregaard
2	MF	DEN	Alberte Munk
3	MF	DEN	Hugrún Helgadóttir
4	DF	DEN	Trine Langhorn (captain)
5	MF	DEN	Sif Hansen
6	DF	DEN	Anna Fotopoulos
7	MF	DEN	Filippa Høgild
8	MF	DEN	Emilie Langhorn
9		DEN	Sofie Tulle Pihl-Jensen
10	FW	DEN	Rosa Horskjær
11	MF	DEN	Maria Jacobsen
12	MF	DEN	Selma Karstensen
13	DF	DEN	Celina Rode
14		DEN	Cecilie Juul Christensen
15	FW	SWE	Lykke Sjöstrand
17	GK	FRO	Valborg Østerø
18	FW	DEN	Nikoline Hoé

No.	Pos.	Nation	Player
19	DF	DEN	Amalie Littau
20	FW	DEN	Doha Bouraba
22	FW	DEN	Sissel Bøje
23	MF	DEN	Emma Thøstesen
24	DF	DEN	Nadja Andersen
25	DF	DEN	Amélie Wittenkamp
—		DEN	Mathilde Juul Christensen
—		DEN	Josefine Holm
—		DEN	Freya Hjernø
—		DEN	Julie Sanggård
—		DEN	Matilde Larsen
—	DF	DEN	Lea Bøg-Jensen
—	FW	DEN	Sidona Michael
—		DEN	Margit Sonne
—		DEN	Elin Stenstrop
—		DEN	Benedikte Egeberg
—		DEN	Olivia Buchardt

== Seasons ==
As of the 2025–26 season

The table lists the results of the regular season, but the final position achieved.

Incomplete

Key
(gold) Champions	Promotion
(silver) Silver	Relegation
(bronze) Bronze	

Season	Tier	#	W	D	L	F	A	Pts.	Cup
DIVISION EAST (1 of 2) (Note: The league was originally divided into two groups of 10 teams, representing the east and the west of the country.)									
1975	1								
1976	1	4th of 10							
1977	1								
1978	1								
1979	1								
1980	1								
SINGLE-DIVISION LEAGUE (Note: From the 1981 season onwards, the league was changed to a single division encompassing the 12 best teams from across the country.)
1981	4 (Note: A second tier, 1st Division (now B-Liga), and a third tier, 2nd Division (now C-Liga), were created in 1993 and 2021, respectively; up until 1993, the Denmark Series (non-league) was the second tier.)								
1982	1								
1983	1								
1984	1								
1985	1								
1986	1								
1987	1								
1988	1								
1989	1								
1990	4								
1991	1								
1992	1								
2011–12	4								
2012–13	2	2nd of 6	7	5	6	27	27	26	3rd round
2013–14	2	1st of 6	11	1	2	39	13	34	2nd round
2014–15	2								

Notes

Sources

- "Historien om Sundby Boldklub | Sundby Boldklub - Fodbold for alle på Amager". www.sundbyboldklub.dk (in Danish).
