= BK Stjernen =

- Founded: 1968; 58 years ago
- Dissolved: 2014
- Ground: Østbyens Stadium
- Capacity: 350
- Website: https://www.bkstjernen.dk/

Boldklubben Stjernen af 1968 (commonly known as BK Stjernen; sometimes Stjernen Svendborg) is a Danish football club based in Svendborg, Denmark. The women's department was closed in 2014 despite its status as a pioneer in the Danish Women's Football League and its successes in the league. Stjernen did not field an 11-a-side from 2009 to its dissolution in 2014.

== History ==
The team was founded in 1968 and were part of an unofficial league with other teams around the country before the establishment of a league under the Danish Football Association in 1972. The club was represented by two of the 1971 Women's World Cup-winning players, Ann Stengård and Bente Kramager. Stengård and Krammager were also celebrated by the club at a June 2026 match for their accomplishments.

== Seasons ==
Key
(gold) Champions	Promotion
(silver) Silver	Relegation
(bronze) Bronze	

Incomplete

Season	Tier	#	W	D	L	F	A	Pts.	Cup
DIVISION WEST (2nd of 2) (Note: The league was originally divided into two groups of 10 teams, representing the east and the west of the country.)									—N/a
1975	1	4th of 10				47	27	23	—N/a
1976	1	2nd of 10				69	10		—N/a
1977	1								—N/a
1978	1								—N/a
1979	1	4th of 10				42	25	20	—N/a
1980	1								—N/a
SINGLE-DIVISION LEAGUE (Note: From the 1981 season onwards, the league was changed to a single division encompassing the 12 best teams from across the country.)									—N/a
1981	1								—N/a
1982	1								—N/a
1983	1	9th of 12	6	4	12	38	51	16	—N/a
1984	1								—N/a
1985	1								—N/a
1986	1								—N/a
1987	1								—N/a
1988	1								—N/a
1989	1								—N/a
1990	1								—N/a
1991	1								—N/a
1992	1								—N/a
1993	1								
1994	1								
1995	1								
1996									
1996–97									
1997–98									
1998–99									
1999–00	5								
2000–01	4	10th of 12							
2001–02	5								
2002–03	5								
2003–04	5	10th of 11	2	2	6	23	40	8	
AS TEAM SYDFYN
2004–05	4								
