= Femina (Denmark) =

Danish women's magazine

- Editor: Camilla Lindemann
- Categories: Female
- Frequency: Weekly
- Publisher: Aller Press AS
- Total circulation (2024): 25,000 (Denmark)
- Founded: 1874; 151 years ago (as a fashion journal); 1952 (as a women's magazine)
- Company: Aller Media
- Country: Denmark
- Based in: Copenhagen
- Language: Danish
- Website: www.femina.dk
- ISSN: 0014-9853

Femina is a Danish language weekly magazine for women published by Aller Media in Copenhagen, Denmark. The magazine also has a Swedish edition.

== History and profile ==
Femina began in its current form in 1952 and is a continuation of illustrated fashion journal Nordisk Mønster Tidende (1874–1952), making it the oldest weekly magazine in Denmark.

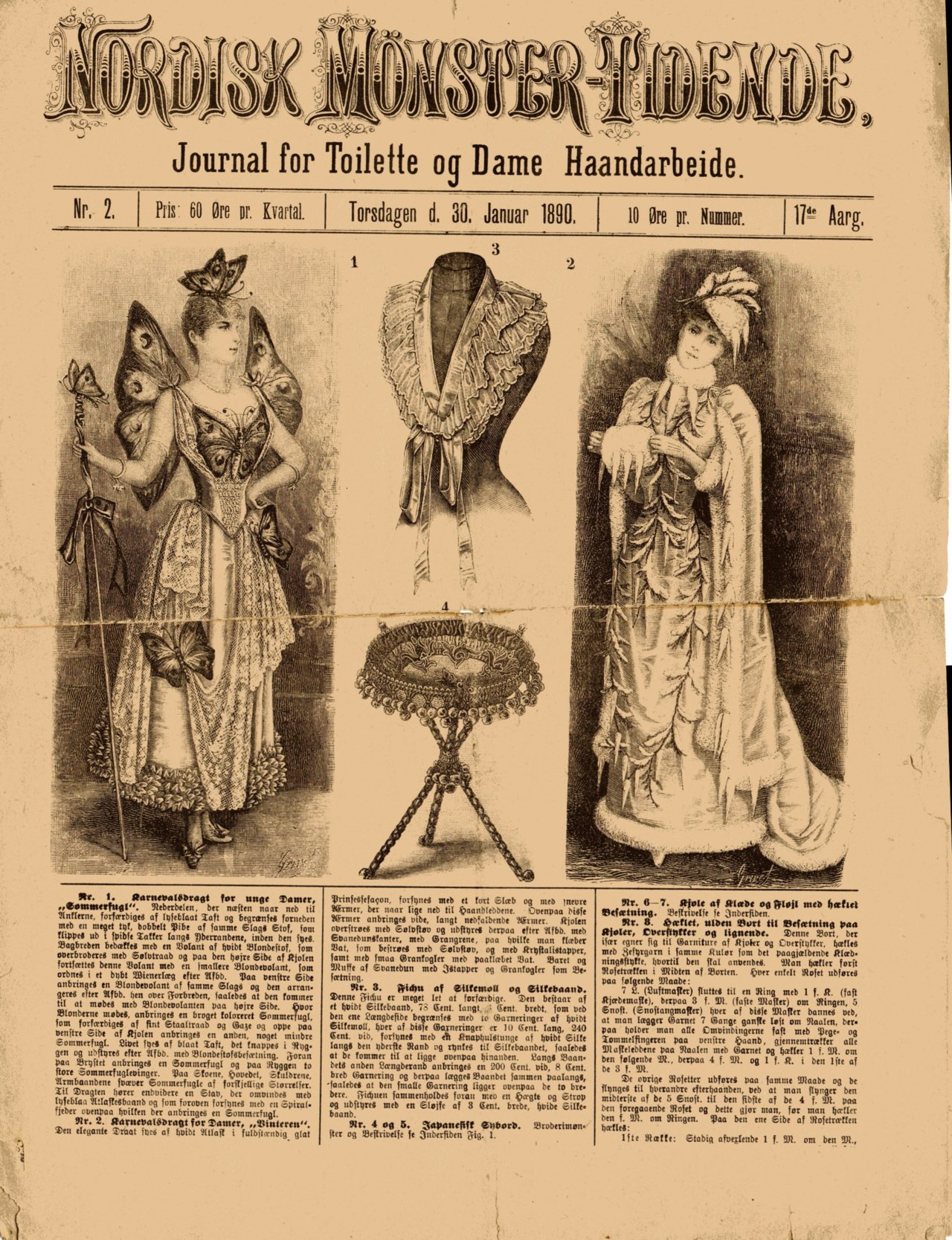
Swedish edition from January 1890

Femina is part of Aller Media and is published by Aller Press AS. The magazine has its headquarters in Copenhagen. Camilla Lindemann has been editor since March 2005. It positions itself towards modern women and covers fashion, food, interior design, health and beauty, psychology and culture. A Swedish edition is also produced.

The 29 July 1903 edition caused a scandal when it printed "bh" as an abbreviation of "brystholder" (brassiere) for the first time.

During the late 1950s, Femina featured articles on women's sport and introduced its readers to both traditional and lesser known sports. In October 1959, the magazine gave its name to BK Femina, a women's football club from Slagelse. They supplied kit and boots for the players and provided sponsorship and coverage to the team which became unofficial World Champions in 1970.

== Circulation ==
In 2001, the magazine had a circulation of 87,000 copies in Denmark. The circulation of the Danish version of Femina was 89,680 copies during the second half of 2003 and 90,000 copies for 2003 as a whole. The circulation of the magazine was 52,000 copies in 2006. It rose to 68,900 copies during the last six months of 2007.

In the second half of 2011, Femina had an average circulation of 54,117 copies per issue. In 2013, the magazine had a circulation of 50,000 copies in Denmark. In 2018, the circulation was down to 38,000 copies in Denmark.

== See also ==
- List of magazines in Denmark

== Bibliography ==
- Fan, Hong; Mangan, J. A. (2003). "Women's Football in Denmark". Soccer, Women, Sexual Liberation: Kicking Off a New Era. Routledge. ISBN 978-0714684086.
