= Women's football in Denmark =

Overview of Denmark in football

Women's Football in Denmark
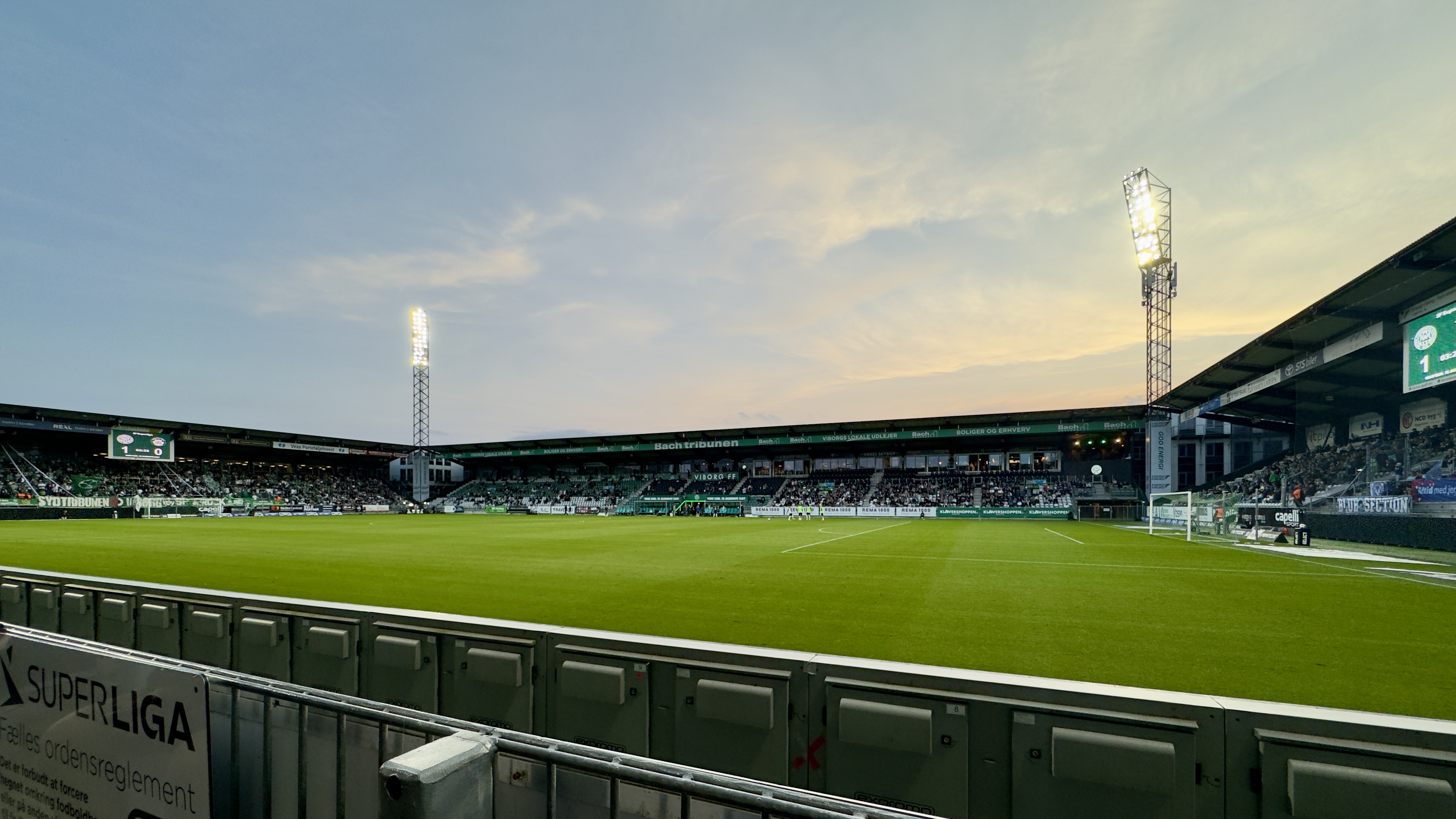
- Energi Viborg Arena, Viborg
- Country: Denmark
- Governing body: Danish Football Association
- National team: Women's national team

National competitions
- FIFA Women's World Cup; UEFA Women's Championship

Club competitions
- Leagues: A-Liga; B-Liga; C-Liga; Kvindeserien; Cups: DBU KvindePokalen

International competitions
- UEFA Women's Champions League

Denmark is one the earliest pioneers of women's football as they participated and won the inaugural 1971 Women's World Cup. The women's team represents the nation in international competitions. Professional women's football in the country is controlled by the Danish Football Association. The association arranges league matches including the A-Liga, the top tier of women's football clubs in Denmark.

== History ==
In 1969, the Danish Football Association received an invitation to participate in the first unofficial European Championship for women. While women's football clubs were not officially recognised by the association, a team was sent by Copenhagen based club BK Femina. The team finished runner-up in the competition behind the Italian women's team. The Danish women's team participated in the inaugural 1971 Women's World Cup held in Mexico City. The team won the title ahead of the hosts Mexico.

With the championship victory, the number of women footballers grew from around 1,500 members in 1971 to 16,000 in 1972. In February 1972, in a meeting of the Danish Football Association in Aalborg, women's football was officially accepted as a part of the association. The first official international match was played on 27 July 1974 in Markusböle, Finland, where Denmark defeated Sweden by a penalty kick. In the UEFA Women's Euro 1991 tournament hosted by Denmark, the team finished third after losing to Norway in the semifinals in a penalty shoot-off before beating Italy in the third place match. In the inaugural FIFA Women's World Cup held in 1991 FIFA Women's World Cup, Denmark finished third in Group A to qualify for the knock-outs, where it lost to Germany.

The Danish team again finished third in the next European tournament held in Italy, losing again to Norway in the semi-finals. In the 1995 world cup, Denmark placed third in Group C before losing to Norway in the quarterfinals. The team qualified for its lone Summer Olympics in 1996, where they finished eighth.

In the 21st century, the Danish team reached the semi-finals of the UEFA Women's Euro 2001 where they lost to Sweden. The team reached another semifinals in 2013 before bettering the result by reaching the UEFA Women's Euro 2017 final. The team finished runners-up after losing to Netherlands in the finals. The team qualified for the 2023 FIFA Women's World Cup. In the World Cup, they were eliminated by hosts Australia in the round of 16.

== Club football ==
The Danish football league system comes under the purview of the football association. Danish Women's League forms the highest tier of women's football in Denmark. All league clubs are eligible to play in the Danish Women's Cup. The top teams of each season from the top tier qualify for the UEFA Women's Champions League.
