= Vorup =

Suburb of Randers, Denmark

Coordinates: 56°26′57″N 10°2′24″E

Vorup is a southwestern suburb of Randers, in Randers Municipality of Denmark, located southwest of Gudenåen and west of the district of Kristrup.

The district's football team, Vorup FB, was founded here in May 1930, and played for a short period in the second half of the 1990s in the 2nd division.

The district is known for its rivalry with Kristrup. The woodland of Henriettelund borders the southwestern part of Vorup.

== Notable people ==
- Ib Christensen (born 1930 in Vorup, died in 2023), a Danish parliamentarian
- Johnny de Lima (born 1964 in Vorup), a Danish boxer, competed at the 1988 Summer Olympics
- Kasper Høgh (born 2000, grew up in Vorup), a Danish footballer
