= Næstved HG =

Women's football club in Denmark

- Short name: NHG
- Founded: 2021; 5 years ago
- Ground: Næstved Stadium
- Capacity: 10,000
- Chairman: Tina Høilund
- Coach: Frederik Guld
- League: B-Liga
- 2024–25: B-Liga, 6th of 8
- Website: Næstved HG
Home colours

Næstved HG is a Danish women's football club based in Næstved, Denmark. The team competes in the B-Liga, the second tier of the Danish Women's Football League. The club was founded in 2021 and plays its home matches at MTM Service Park. Næstved HG is a collaborative women's football project between Næstved IF and Herlufsholm GF (HG).

== History ==
Due to economic difficulties and the lack of an elite organization, the women's football department of Herlufsholm GF approached Næstved IF Fodbold with the intention of creating a women's superstructure between the two clubs, which resulted in Næstved HG Kvindeelite being formed on 1 July 2021, playing based on the league license of Herlufsholm GF. The club plays its home matches at Næstved Stadium in Næstved.

In the 2023–24 season, Næstved HG qualified for the promotion play-offs for the Gjensidige Kvindeliga, Denmark's top division in women's football. During the 2025 season, the club competed in the Danish women's B-Liga (First Division).

== Stadium ==
Næstved HG plays its home matches at Næstved Stadium in Næstved, Denmark.

== Players ==
As of 29 August 2026

Note: Flags indicate national team as defined under FIFA eligibility rules; some limited exceptions apply. Players may hold more than one non-FIFA nationality.

No.	Pos.	Nation	Player
1	GK	DEN	Christina Kese
3	MF	DEN	Victoria Lytting
4	DF	DEN	Martha Langskov
5	DF	DEN	Kristine Neumann
7	MF	DEN	Emma Heyde
8	MF	DEN	Julie Thrane
9	MF	IND	Aveka Singh
10	MF	DEN	Louise Engholm (captain)
11	FW	USA	Melissa Martinez
12	GK	DEN	Laura Rylund
14	MF	DEN	Mathilde Bøgevig

No.	Pos.	Nation	Player
15	DF	DEN	Sandra Pedersen
16	DF	DEN	Karoline Ellegård
17	MF	DEN	Maya Santhirasegaram
19	DF	DEN	Rose Blinge
20	MF	DEN	Matilde Baraviec
21	MF	DEN	Sarika Santhirasegaram
22	MF	DEN	Emilia Krogh
24	MF	DEN	Cecilie Lytting
30	MF	ITA	Marta Grosso
49	GK	BEL	Teagan Fleming-Hübertz

=== Player records ===
==== Caps ====
Incomplete

#	Player	Caps
	(Denmark) Louise Ringsing	250+

=== Captains ===
Incomplete

Years	Player
2026–	(Denmark) Louise Engholm
–2026	(Denmark) Katrine Kindtler Krag-Andersen
–2023	(Denmark) Karoline Ellegård

== Management ==
As of 14 August 2026

Position	Staff
Head Coach	(Denmark) Frederik Guld
Assistant Coach	(Denmark) Laura Rylund
Goalkeeping Coach	(Denmark) Jan Mikkelsen
Team Manager	(Denmark) Randi Fjellerad
MEDICAL STAFF
Physiotherapist	(Denmark) Rikke Krogh Olesen
