= B52/Aalborg FC (women) =

- Full name: B52/Aalborg Fodbold Club
- Short name: B52/AFC
- Founded: 1961; 65 years ago
- Ground: B52/AFC Stadium
- Chairman: Louis Lantow
- Coach: Rasmus Juel Lundgreen
- League: Series 2
- 2025–26: Series 2, 3rd of 6
- Website: https://www.b52.dk/holdoversigt/senior/kvinder-serie-2
Home colours

B52/Aalborg Fodbold Club (commonly known as B52/AFC) is a Danish football club based in Aalborg, Denmark. The club currently plays in Series 2, the 7th tier of the Danish football league system.

== History ==
B52 was founded in 1961 and in 1972 merged with Aalborg Fodbold Club (AFC) to form B52/AFC. The team were promoted in 1986 and entered the top division in 1987. The club has had many talented players through the years, including Nadia Nadim, 2024 Danish Football Hall of Fame inductee Helle Jensen, and 2008 Danish Football Player of the Year Mariann Gajhede Knudsen.

== Players ==
As of 7 October 2026

Note: Flags indicate national team as defined under FIFA eligibility rules; some limited exceptions apply. Players may hold more than one non-FIFA nationality.

No.	Pos.	Nation	Player
—		DEN	Kristine Hougaard
—		DEN	Tanja Juul
—		DEN	Benedicte Sperling
—		DEN	Caroline Hieronymus
—		DEN	Helen Urban
—		DEN	Nanna Bak
—		DEN	Louise Albertsen
—		DEN	Cecilie Erkstrøm Brask
—		DEN	Kirstine Grønhøj

No.	Pos.	Nation	Player
—		DEN	Katrina Svartá
—		DEN	Gitte Grenaa
—		DEN	Freja Langthjem
—		DEN	Øznur Inekci
—		DEN	Camilla Mønnike-Hald
—		DEN	Louise Albertsen
—		DEN	Anne Krebs
—		DEN	Amanda Lundkær
—		DEN	Jasmin Nielsen

=== Player records ===
==== Caps ====
#	Player	Caps
	(Denmark) Lisbeth Nielsen	100+

=== Captains ===
Years	Player
	(Denmark) Bente "Puskas" Nielsen

== Management ==
=== Coaching ===
Position	Name
Coach	(Denmark) Rasmus Juel Lundgreen

=== Managers ===
Years	Name
2004	(Denmark) Steen Refsgaard
1996–2002	(Denmark) Keld Skov Pedersen
1991	(Denmark) Svend Lindahl
	(Denmark) Carsten Kjær
1989	(Denmark) Finn Jønson
1987	(Denmark) Peter Andersen
1985	(Denmark) Jan Knudsen
1983	(Denmark) Palle Thøgersen
1980–	(Denmark) Per Hansen

== Seasons ==
As of the 2025–26 season

Key
(gold) Champions	Promotion
(silver) Silver	Relegation
(bronze) Bronze	

Incomplete

Season	Tier	#	W	D	L	F	A	Pts.	Cup
DIVISION WEST (2nd of 2) (Note: The league was originally divided into two groups of 10 teams, representing the east and the west of the country.)									—N/a
1975	1	7th of 10				23	30	16	—N/a
1976	1	4th of 10				37	26	15	—N/a
1977									—N/a
1978									—N/a
1979	5 (Note: The second, third and fourth divisions were established in 1993, 2021, and 1981, respectively. Until then, the Local Denmark Series, today tier 5, was the second tier.)	4th of 10				42	17	22	—N/a
1980	5								—N/a
SINGLE-DIVISION LEAGUE (Note: From the 1981 season onwards, the league was changed to a single division encompassing the 12 best teams from across the country.)									—N/a
1981	4								—N/a
1982									—N/a
1983	5								—N/a
1984									—N/a
1985	4	2nd							—N/a
1986	4								—N/a
1987	1								—N/a
1988									—N/a
1989	1								—N/a
1990									—N/a
1991	4	5th of 12						23	—N/a
1992									—N/a
1993									
1994									
1995									
1996	2								
1996–97	1	7th of 8	6	0	22	35	122	18	
1997–98	2								
1998–99	1	8th of 8	5	3	20	27	79	18	
1999–00	2	2nd of 8	10	1	3	46	23	36	SF
2000–01	1	8th of 8	2	6	20	31	96	12	3rd round
2001–02	2	3rd of 8							2nd round
2002–03	2	5th of 12							2nd round
2003–04	2	3rd of 12							2nd round
2004–05	2	5th of 12							3rd round
2005–06	2	8th of 12							3rd round
2006–07	2	9th of 12							2nd round
2007–08	2	10th of 10							1st round
2008–09	4	8th of 8							—N/a
2009–10	5 (Note: The team is demoted to tier 6 following matches they had forfeited)	4th of 6							—N/a
2010–11	7	3rd of 8							—N/a
2011–12	6	1st of 6							—N/a
2012–13	6	3rd of 6							—N/a
2013–14	6	3rd of 6							—N/a
2014–15	6	2nd of 6							—N/a
2015–16	6	3rd of 6							—N/a
2016–17	6	6th of 6							—N/a
2017–18	6								—N/a
2018–19	6	1st of 6							—N/a
2019–20	5	1st of 8 (Note: Matches in spring 2020 cancelled due to the COVID-19 pandemic)							—N/a
2020–21	5	3rd of 8							—N/a
2021–22	5	5th of 7							—N/a
2022–23	4	5th of 8							—N/a
2023–24	7	2nd of 6							—N/a
2024–25	7	2nd of 6							—N/a
2025–26	7	3rd of 6							—N/a
2026–27	7	Season in progress							—N/a

Notes

Sources

- "A-Liga | Stilling, resultater & kampprogram". Bold (in Danish).
- "Fortuna Hjørring Scrapbog 1979". Issuu (in Danish). 2017-12-15.
- "arkiv.dk | B52/Aalborg Fodbold Club. Fodbold. Damer. Jyllandsserien. År 1983". arkiv.azurewebsites.net.
- "arkiv.dk | B52/Aalborg Fodbold Club. Fodbold. Damer. Danmarksserien. År 1985". arkiv.azurewebsites.net.
- "arkiv.dk | B52/Aalborg Fodbold Club. 1. division. År 1989". arkiv.azurewebsites.net.
- "arkiv.dk | B52/Aalborg Fodbold Club. Fodbold. Damer. Danmarksserien. År 1991". arkiv.azurewebsites.net.
- "Årsberetning 2000" (PDF). Dansk Boldspil-Union (in Danish). 2000-02-01.
