= Kolding IF Women =

Danish football club

Kolding IF
- Full name: Kolding Idrætsforening
- Nickname: De blå-hvide (The blue-whites)
- Short name: KIF
- Founded: 1 August 2009; 17 years ago
- Ground: Kolding Stadium, Kolding
- Capacity: 10,000
- Chairman: Claus Holm-Søberg
- Coach: Lasse Skovhøj
- League: A-Liga
- 2024-25: 8th of 8
- Website: Kolding IF
Home colours	Away colours

Kolding IF Women (previously KoldingQ and Kolding B) is a Danish women's football club based in Kolding, Denmark. The club plays in A-Liga, the top-flight of the Danish Women's Football League. Their home matches take place at Kolding Stadium. Kolding IF (KIF) and Kolding B have existed as one club in different constellations over the years. The journey of this league license started with the founding of Kolding B in 1971, transferred at the two clubs' merger to Kolding IF in 1996, then back to Kolding B without KIF in 2006. Kolding B then entered into a collaboration with Nr. Bjært Strandhuse IF to form KoldingQ in 2009, before leaving in 2019. Kolding IF took over the KoldingQ license in 2021.

== History ==
=== Kolding Boldklub ===
Kolding B was founded in February 1971 and started competing in the Western Division of the nationwide league in 1975. In 1977 Kolding finished first in the Western Division and qualified for the final against Eastern Division winners BK Femina, to whom they lost. Kolding failed to qualify for the new single-division league and were relegated to the Denmark Series from 1981.

=== KoldingQ ===
KoldingQ was established on 1 August 2009 as a merger of the women's departments of Nr. Bjært Strandhuse IF and Kolding Boldklub with the aim to become the biggest club in Danish women's football. However, finances proved to be insufficient to achieve this success in the A-Liga and overall, which led to the decision to merge the club with Kolding IF in 2021. Kolding Boldklub departed the club in 2019, ten years following the merger.

In 2013 Lotte Troelsgaard joined the team, she has been a part of the Danish national team for several years. The following year, in 2014 her twin sister Sanne Troelsgaard who is one of the profiles on the national team joined the team. They played together for KoldingQ for three seasons, winning the bronze medal in the Elitedivisionen in 2014/15, 2015/16. After the 2016/17 season Sanne Troelsgaard left the club and went to play football in Sweden instead for the Damallsvenskan club FC Rosengård.

Early in 2017 another profile from the Danish national team signed contract for KoldingQ; when the goal keeper Stina Lykke Petersen moved back to Denmark in order to be closer to her family and friends. She chose to play for KoldingQ without wage even though she had offers from clubs from other countries, she chose a Danish club in order to be closer to her family and friends. The club competed against Skovbakken to win the bronze medal in Elitedivisionen, but in the final round Skovbakken was one point ahead of KoldingQ. Both teams won their last matches, KoldingQ beat BSF with 10-0 with five goals by Sanne Troelsgaard, it was not enough in order to win the bronze medal, because Skovbakken also won their final match 3-1 against Vejle.

== Players ==
=== Current squad ===
As of 8 October 2026

Note: Flags indicate national team as defined under FIFA eligibility rules; some limited exceptions apply. Players may hold more than one non-FIFA nationality.

No.	Pos.	Nation	Player
1	GK	SRB	Ema Aleksić
2	DF	DEN	Laura Colstrup
3	DF	DEN	Asta Kynde
4	DF	DEN	Julia Amby
5	DF	DEN	Ella Nordentoft
6	FW	DEN	Cecilie Byrnak
7	MF	DEN	Elisabeth Rosenørn
8	MF	DEN	Julie Tenfjord
11	FW	DEN	Sara Amby (captain)
12	DF	DEN	Amalie Callesen
13	DF	USA	Esmé Brayshaw
14	DF	DEN	Silje Simonsen
15	FW	DEN	Amalie Lund
16	DF	USA	Kendra Maki

No.	Pos.	Nation	Player
17	MF	DEN	Andrea Thierry
18	DF	DEN	Bella Madsen
19	FW	DEN	Cecilie Christensen
21	MF	DEN	Mille Kjærgaard
22	MF	DEN	Emma Hoppe
23	DF	DEN	Cecilie Gaulshøj
24	DF	DEN	Lærke Hammer
25	MF	DEN	Verona Abdullahu
26	MF	DEN	Frederikke Ludvigsen
28	MF	DEN	Laura Johansen
29	MF	DEN	Camille Larsen (vice-captain)
32	MF	DEN	Cecilie Gaulshøj
50	GK	DEN	Asta Ravn

=== Captains ===
Incomplete

Years	Captain
2026–	(Denmark) Sara Amby
2025–2026	(Denmark) Sofie Grøn
2023–2025	(Denmark) Ida Guldager
2022–2023	(Denmark) Sofie Riis
–2022	(Denmark) Louise Eriksen
As KoldingQ
	(Denmark) Sofie Hornemann
2017–	(Denmark) Lotte Troelsgaard
–2017	(Denmark) Sanne Troelsgaard
	(Denmark) Signe Andersen

=== Player records ===
==== Caps ====
Incomplete

#	Player	Caps
	(Denmark) Julie Tenfjord	100

== Management ==
As of 2 August 2026

=== First team ===
Role	Name
Head Coach	(Denmark) Lasse Skovhøj
Assistant Coach	(Denmark) Josefine Ladegourdie
Goalkeeping Coach	(Czech Republic) Martin Raška
Fitness Coach	(Denmark) Lukas Rodrigues
Mental Coach	(Denmark) Ole Dau Mortensen
Team Managers	(Denmark) Rune Elkjær
Team Managers	(Denmark) Birgitte Dam
Physiotherapist	(Denmark) Sofie Andersen

=== Club officials ===
Role	Name
Chairman	Claus Holm-Søberg
Technical Director	Frederik Lund

=== Managers ===
Incomplete

Years	Coach
2024–	Lasse Skovhøj
–2024	Allan Drost
As KoldingQ
2020–2021	Anders Jensen
2017–2019	Peter Pedersen
2016–2017	Daniel Theemann
2013–2016	Lene Terp
2011–2012	Kim Foder

== Seasons ==
As of the 2025–26 season

Key
(gold) Champions	Promotion
(silver) Silver	Relegation
(bronze) Bronze	Championship Final

Incomplete

Season	Tier	#	W	D	L	F	A	Pts.	Cup
As Kolding B
DIVISION WEST (2nd of 2) (Note: The league was originally divided into two groups of 10 teams, representing the east and the west of the country.)
1975	1	2nd of 10				54	15	28	
1976	1	3rd of 10				36	11	28	
1977	1	1st of 10				52	10	34	
1978	1								
1979	1	6th of 10				23	29	15	
1980	1								
SINGLE-DIVISION LEAGUE (Note: From the 1981 season onwards, the league was changed to a single division encompassing the 12 best teams from across the country.)
1981	5 (Note: The non-league Jutland Series, today tier 5, was then tier 3.)								
1982	5								
1983	4								
1984	4								
1985	1								
1986	1								
1987	1								
1988	1								
1989	1								
1990	1								
1991	1								
1992	1								
1993	1								
1994	1								
1995	1	6th of 8	9	3	16	57	98	30	
1996	1								
As Kolding IF
1996–97	2	1st of 8	13	0	0	50	10	43	
1997–98	1	7th of 8	4	3	21	23	99	15	
1998–99	2	4th of 8	7	2	5	28	20	23	
1999–00	2	5th of 8	4	3	7	23	27	18	
2000–01	2	5th of 8	4	2	8	30	42	19	
2001–02	2	8th of 8	2	3	9	23	40	9	3rd round
2002–03	4 (Note: A third tier, 2nd Division (now C-Liga), was created in 2021; up until then, the Denmark Series (non-league) was the third tier.)	1st of 6							
2003–04	2	8th of 12	7	7	8	55	59	28	
2004–05	2	7th of 12	8	6	8	37	46	30	
2005–06	2	11th of 12	5	1	16	28	71	16	
As Kolding B
2006–07	4	1st of 18	10	0	0	49	5	30	
2007–08	2	1st of 10	13	1	4	75	21	40	
2008–09	1	8th of 10	3	3	12	23	66		
As KoldingQ
2009–10	1	5th of 10	9	3	6	42	36	28	
2010–11	1	7th of 10	5	0	13	26	60	15	
2011–12	1	6th of 10	5	2	11	25	60	17	
2012–13	1	5th of 10	7	1	10	33	36	22	
2013–14	1	5th of 8	2	1	7	9	19	16	
2014–15	1	3rd of 8	7	0	3	33	20	39	
2015–16	1	3rd of 8	3	3	4	13	23	24	
2016–17	1	4th of 8	3	1	6	18	23	16	
2017–18	1	3rd of 8	5	1	4	17	12	20	
2018–19	1	5th of 8	2	2	6	12	24	10	
2019–20	1	6th of 8	4	3	7	14	30	15	
2020–21	1	4th of 8	8	1	5	32	17	25	
Kolding IF
2021–22	1	5th of 8	5	2	7	15	21	17	
2022–23	1	6th of 8	4	3	7	15	23	15	
2023–24	1	5th of 8	6	2	6	14	16	20	
2024–25	1	8th of 8	1	3	10	11	37	6	
2025–26	1	6th of 8	3	2	9	16	32	11	SF
2026–27	1	Season in progress							

Sources

- Kolding IF – DBU
- Kolding B – DBU
- Tipsbladet
- "Fortuna Hjørring Scrapbog 1975". Issuu (in Danish). p. 7.
- "Fortuna Hjørring Scrapbog 1976". Issuu (in Danish). p. 12.
- "Fortuna Hjørring Scrapbog 1977". Issuu (in Danish). p. 4.
- "Fortuna Hjørring Scrapbog 1979". Issuu (in Danish). p. 7.
- "Fortuna Hjørring Scrapbog 1981". Issuu (in Danish). p. 7.
- "Dansk fodbold: Kvindefodbold". Berlingske.dk (in Danish). 1999-06-03. Archived from the original on 2022-01-08.

== Futsal ==
The team has had good results in the Danish Futsal Championship. In 2009 Kolding Boldklub won silver at the Danish Championship in futsal, defeated by OB in the final. The following two years the team took silver in the Danish Futsal Championship under the new name KoldingQ, after being defeated by Team Viborg and IK Skovbakken. In 2012 the team took bronze.

== See also ==
- Kolding IF (men's team)
