= Ribe Boldklub =

Ribe BK
- Short name: RBK
- Founded: 1968; 58 years ago
- Ground: Ribe Fritidscenter
- Capacity: 1,500
- Chairman: Jesper Fabrin
- Coach: Marco Wilhelmsen Andreassen
- League: Jutland Series
- 2025–26: 5th of 8
- Website: https://www.ribeboldklub.dk/

Ribe Boldklub (commonly known as Ribe BK) is an association football club based in Ribe, Denmark. The club plays in a current collaboration with Hviding IF in the Jutland Series, the non-league fifth tier of the Danish football league system. Ribe has won the league 3 times, in 1976, 1978, and 1979, and the two inaugural cup championships in succession in 1973 and 1974.

== History ==
Ribe changed its name from Ribe BK&GF to Ribe BK in 1993 due to a merger with Nørremarkens Boldklub. Ribe entered into a collaboration with hitherto rivals Hviding IF in 2017 to further the local women's football.

== Players ==
As of 24 October 2026

Note: Flags indicate national team as defined under FIFA eligibility rules; some limited exceptions apply. Players may hold more than one non-FIFA nationality.

No.	Pos.	Nation	Player
—		DEN	Sola Skalborg Dam Schmidt
—		DEN	Frida Thomsen
—		DEN	Helena Holm Lund
—		DEN	Lærke Hamann
—		DEN	Caroline Biel Nørgaard
—		DEN	Mia Friis Erbs
—		DEN	Ida Stagaard
—		DEN	Andrea-Elisabeth Christiansen
—		DEN	Johanne Højsgaard Hansen

No.	Pos.	Nation	Player
—		DEN	Jasmin Linding Pedersen
—		DEN	Emma Madsen
—		DEN	Maja Laursen
—		DEN	Malou Diabelez
—		DEN	Freja Skou Henriksen
—		DEN	Astrid Schmidt Tønder
—		DEN	Mette Madsen
—		DEN	Sofie Kristensen
—		DEN	Karen Ernst Lüdeking

== Management ==
=== Coaching ===
As of October 2026

Role	Staff
Assistant Coach	Marco Wilhelmsen Andreassen
Team Manager	Susanne Biel Nørgaard

=== Managers ===
Years	Name
	Søren Ernst Lüdeking & Kasper Nielsen
	Ronald Hansen
	Jørgen Berg Nielsen
1973–1974	Mogens Vinther

== Seasons ==
Key
(gold) Champions	Promotion
(silver) Silver	Relegation
(bronze) Bronze	Championship Final

Incomplete

Season	Tier	#	W	D	L	F	A	Pts.	Cup
DIVISION WEST (2nd of 2) (Note: The league was originally divided into two groups of 10 teams, representing the east and the west of the country.)									—N/a
1975	1	2nd of 12							—N/a
1976	1	1st of 12							—N/a
1977	1								—N/a
1978	1	1st of 12							—N/a
1979	1	1st of 12							—N/a
1980	1								—N/a
SINGLE-DIVISION LEAGUE (Note: From the 1981 season onwards, the league was changed to a single division encompassing the 12 best teams from across the country.)									—N/a
1981	4								—N/a
1982									—N/a
1983									—N/a
1984									—N/a
1985									—N/a
1986									—N/a
1987									—N/a
1988									—N/a
1989									—N/a
