= Vorup Frederiksberg Boldklub =

Danish football club

Vorup FB
- Full name: Vorup Frederiksberg Boldklub
- Short name: Vorup FB
- Founded: 1 May 1930; 96 years ago
- Ground: XL Park Vorup – Ulvehøj, Haslund, Randers
- Capacity: 3,000
- Chairman: Finn Christiansen
- Coach: Svenne Poulsen
- League: Denmark Series
- 2025–26: Denmark Series, 3rd of 10
Home colours	Away colours

Vorup Frederiksberg Boldklub (originally Frederiksberg Boldklub; commonly known as Vorup FB or simply Vorup) is a Danish amateur football club based in Haslund, a suburb of Randers, which plays in the fifth tier Denmark Series. Founded on 1 May 1930, the club plays its home games at XL Park Vorup – Ulvehøj, which has a 3,000 spectator capacity.

== History ==
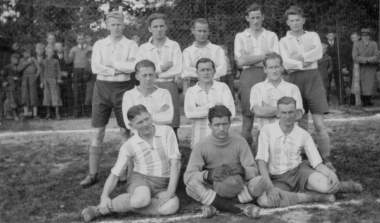
Frederiksberg Boldklub having won the JBU B-række in 1934.

Frederiksberg Boldklub was founded in the Randers suburb of Vorup on 1 May 1930 as the successor of Vorup Boldklub, which went bankrupt in 1927 after having existed since 1915. The new club was immediately inducted into the Jydsk Boldspil-Union (JBU), and initially played its home matches on its predecessor's home field until renting another the following year. Three years later the club inaugurated its own field as well as a wooden club house, and won the championship of the JBU B-række.

In 1949 Frederiksberg Boldklub inaugurated a new stadium, and had a barracks originally built by the German military in Aalborg during World War II transported to Vorup. The following year the barracks were inaugurated as the club's new clubhouse.

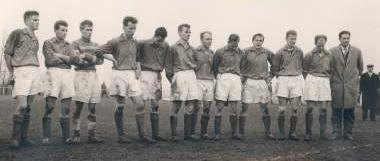
Frederiksberg Boldklub having won the JBU Serie 1 in 1959.

In 1959 Frederiksberg Boldklub won the championship of the then 5th tier JBU Serie 1, and the next year changed its name to Vorup Frederiksberg Boldklub (Vorup FB).

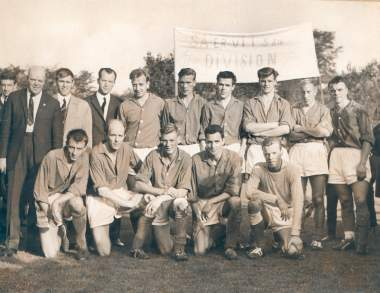
Vorup FB having won promotion to the 3. Division in 1965.

Winning the championship of the then 4th tier Jyllandsserien in 1965 the club secured promotion to the 3. Division, and in 1971 began playing its home matches at the larger Ulvehøj Idrætscenter (in 2012 renamed XL Park Vorup – Ulvehøj) in the Randers suburb of Haslund. A new clubhouse was inaugurated adjacent the same year, which was expanded in 1986.

On 1 January 2003 Vorup FB was one of the six founding clubs of Randers FC which today plays in the 1st tier Superligaen, while Vorup FB has returned to playing in Jyllandsserien.

=== Women's team ===
From August 1970 women also played football in association with Vorup FB, and from the onset participated in the tournament established for Jutland and Funen the following year. Already in 1971 and 1972 Vorup FB's women won the local championship and thus promotion to the then 2nd tier Jyllandsserien, and when in 1972, 1973, and 1974 they won Dagbladets Cup they were directed not to play for it again as they were simply too good compared to their competitors.

On 24 January 1973 Vorup FB established an actual women's division, and the same year Vorup FB's women won the championship of Jyllandsserien and thus promotion to the then 1st tier Damedivisionen. From 1988 two of the clubs female players, Mette Nielsen and Kamma Flæng, played for the Denmark women's national football team, the former e.g. at the 1991 World Cup in China and the latter e.g. at the 1996 Olympic Games in Atlanta.

In 1993 Vorup FB's women qualified for the Danish Women's Cup Final, but lost the match in extra time. Due to economic difficulties the club had to quit women's football at the elite level in 2000, but today the economy is back on track and Vorup FB's women play in the 2nd tier 1. division.

== Colours ==
Vorup FB's colours are blue and white.

== Stadium ==
Vorup FB plays its home matches on XL Park Vorup – Ulvehøj, which was built to hold 3,000 spectators and has an attendance record of 2,300 people. Artificial turf and a 19 m2 big screen has made XL Park Vorup often voted the best stadium in their league.

== Achievements ==
- Quarter finalist 1965 Danish Cup

== Club officials ==
- Chairman: Finn Christiansen
- First team coach: Michael Hansen
- First team coach (Women): Peter Uhrskov
- Managing director: Thomas Raaby Pedersen
- Chief groundsman: Jes Petersen

== Sources ==
- Danmarks Stadions (19.06.2002) Ulvehøj Idrætscenter. Skanderborg, Denmark; UnoEuro Danmark
- Larsen, Mads D. & Kristensen, Lykke Møller (2006). De jyske fodboldklubbers historie – Milepæle, bedrifter og profiler. Om udviklingen i jysk fodbold fortalt med klubbens egne ord, 2. Bind, M til Å. Viby J, Denmark; Jydsk Boldspil-Union
- Randers FC A/S (2011). HISTORIE. Copenhagen, Denmark; Larsen Data ApS
- Vorup FB Damefodbold 's website
