= A-Liga =

Football league in Denmark

- Organising body: DBU
- Founded: 1974; 52 years ago
- First season: 1975
- Country: Denmark
- Confederation: UEFA
- Divisions: 2 (1975–1980); 1 (1981–present)
- Number of clubs: 10 (2026–present) (Note: PREVIOUS: 20 (1975–1980) 12 (1981–1992) 8 (1993–2007) 10 (2007–2015) 8 (2015–2026))
- Level on pyramid: 1
- Relegation to: B-Liga
- Domestic cup(s): Danish Women's Cup (1992–present)
- International cup(s): Champions League; Europa Cup
- Current champions: HB Køge (4th title) (2025–26)
- Most championships: Fortuna Hjørring; Brøndby IF (12 titles)
- Broadcaster: TV 2 (2025–)
- Website: www.a-liga.dk
- Current: 2026–27 A-Liga

A-Liga is a semi-professional association football league in Denmark and the highest division of the Danish football league system. Contested by 10 clubs, it operates on a system of promotion and relegation within the Danish Women's Football League. The league is overseen by the Danish Football Association (DBU). Clubs in the league must meet certain criteria concerning appropriate facilities and finances. All 10 clubs in the league qualify for the Danish Cup (Danish: DBU KvindePokalen). Each season's winners and runners-up qualify for the UEFA Women's Champions League qualification, while the bronze medallists qualify for the UEFA Women's Europa Cup qualification.

According to FIFA's 2023 Women's Benchmarking Report, the 2021-22 league season drew an average of 388 fans per game, 57% of players had signed compensated player contracts (with an average annual salary of $10-15k USD), and 29% of players enjoyed football as their primary income. A rise in interest and participation in women's football has driven increased investment into the league in recent years, although the best players in Denmark still often depart for fully professional clubs abroad.

In March 2025, TV 2 announced that they had secured the broadcasting rights to the league, running until 2031.

== Format ==
The main round of the league is played in autumn as a double round-robin tournament between the 8 participating teams, where each team plays against each other both at home and away. The six best placed teams qualify for the spring championship play-offs, another double round-robin tournament among the six participating teams. From the 2021–22 season onwards, the scores from the regular season have been carried over into the championship play-offs.

The two bottom ranked teams instead play in qualification play-offs, a double round-robin tournament with the top four teams of 2025–26 B-Liga for two spots in 2026–27 A-Liga. The scores from the main league round are not carried over into the qualification play-offs.

=== Changes ===
From 1994 to 2005/06 the league consisted of 8 teams playing each other 3 times and the best team then was awarded the championship. The last team was relegated with the second-to-last team facing the second team of the 1st Division in play-offs.

2006/07 was a transition year as the league expanded to 10 teams. The last placed team after the season played a relegation match against the third placed team of the 1st Division, for a place in Elitedivisionen. The top two teams of the 1. division were automatically promoted.

From 2007/08 to 2012/13 the league consisted of 10 teams. Those 10 teams played a double round robin as a regular season. After that there would be two play-off groups; first to fourth-placed of the regular season would play for the championship, while fifth to tenth-placed would play to stay in the top flight. In the Playoffs, the points accumulated over the regular season are divided by 2 (rounding up if necessary). Those points are the starting points for the playoffs. The Championship group plays another round robin (6 matches each) with the winner being awarded the championship title. The Relegation Group plays a single round robin (5 matches each) after which, the bottom two clubs are relegated.

The 2013/14 season again was played only with eight teams. The top six after the regular season play a championship league, the seventh and the eight placed teams play in a qualification league determining whether they keep their spots or get relegated.

In August 2025, it was announced that the 2026–2027 season would be expanded to include 10 teams.

== History ==
The league's status as semi-professional presented challenges for its return-to-play from the 2019–2020 COVID-19 pandemic, as initially only fully professional sports were allowed to resume in Denmark following the pandemic.

On 3 October 2026 the A-Liga attendance record was broken with 8,047 spectators.

== Name ==
The division has gone through multiple iterations over the course of its history. It began as The Danish Ladies Tournament (Danmarksturneringen i damefodbold, 1975 to 1980), then Danish Ladies 1st Division (Dame 1. division, 1981 to 1992), The Danish Elite Division (Elitedivisionen, 1993 to 2015–16) and The Danish Women's League (Kvindeligaen, 2016–17 to 2024–25). For sponsorship reasons, it was known as 3F Ligaen for fourteen seasons (2005–06 until 2018–19) and from 2019–2025 as Gjensidige Kvindeligaen.

In 2025, the pyramid was renamed, with the top flight now called A-Liga, and the corresponding lower levels B-Liga and C-Liga, respectively.

== Clubs ==
=== Champions ===
The list also includes the 1973 and 1974 national tournament finals champions that were crowned before the establishment of the nationwide top-flight division in 1975. Italics indicate former champions that are currently outside the A-Liga.

Club	Winners	Runners-up	Winning seasons
Fortuna Hjørring	12	22	1994, 1995, 1996, 1998–99, 2001–02, 2008–09, 2009–10, 2013–14, 2015–16, 2017–18, 2019–20, 2024–25
Brøndby IF	12	11	2002–03, 2003–04, 2004–05, 2005–06, 2006–07, 2007–08, 2010–11, 2011–12, 2012–13, 2014–15, 2016–17, 2018–19
AGF (Note: The collective wins of the respective previous incarnations of the club, Hjortshøj-Egå IK and IK Skovbakken)	10	6	1982, 1984, 1986, 1987, 1988, 1989, 1990, 1991, 1996–97, 1997–98
B 1909	5	5	1981, 1983, 1985, 1992, 1993
Ribe Boldklub	5	1	1973, 1974, 1976, 1978, 1979
HB Køge	4	0	2020–21, 2021–22, 2022–23, 2025–26
BK Femina	3	4	1975, 1977, 1980
OB Q	2	0	1999–2000, 2000–01
FC Nordsjælland	1	1	2023–24

=== 2026–27 season ===
Club	2025–26	First	Total	Recent	#	Titles	Latest title
ASA Fodbold	9th	2016	2	2026–27	1	0	—N/a
Brøndby IF	2nd	1996	31	2000–01	27	12	2018–19
Copenhagen	8th	2026–27	1	2026–27	—N/a	0	—N/a
Fortuna Hjørring	3rd	1975	52	1979	48	12	2024–25
HB Køge	1st	2020–21	7	2020–21	—N/a	4	2025–26
Kolding IF	6th	1975	31	2008–09	18	0	—N/a
FC Midtjylland	7th	2025–26	2	2025–26	—N/a	0	—N/a
FC Nordsjælland	4th	2019–20	8	2019–20	—N/a	1	2023–24
Odense Boldklub Q	10th	1990	33	2024–25	3	2	2000–01
Aarhus GF (Note: AGF encompasses the history of former A-Liga clubs Hjortshøj-Egå (HEI), IK Skovbakken, and VSK Aarhus.)	5th	1976	52	1976	—N/a	10	1997–98

=== Top flight seasons ===
As of the 2026–27 season

More than 70 teams have played in the top flight since its inaugural season in 1975. However, several teams have merged over the years to form the current clubs, the combined results of which will be displayed where noted. The teams in bold compete in the A-Liga currently, while the teams in italics are now defunct.

Incomplete

#	Club	Total	Latest
1	**Fortuna Hjørring**	52	2027
2	**AGF Fodbold** (Note: Represented by VSK Aarhus from 2016-2020 (a merger between IK Skovbakken and Vejlby IK); IK Skovbakken from 2002–2016; and from 1976 to 2001 by Hjortshøj-Egå Aarhus (HEI).)	52	2027
3	BSF (Note: 26 seasons in the top-flight as Skovlunde IF.)	36	2020
4	**OB Q** (Note: This is the combined total of OB, Odense Q, and the current OB Q constellation, the two latter derived from the original OB team.)	33	2027
5	**Brøndby IF**	31	2027
6	**Kolding IF** (Note: Includes seasons as Kolding BK and Kolding Q.)	31	2027
7	Vejle B	28	2018
8	BK Rødovre	26	1999
9	B 1909	20	1994
10	Hillerød Fodbold	15	2002
11	BK Femina	14	2000
12	Ringsted IF	13	
13	BK Stjernen	11	
14	B52/Aalborg FC	10	2001
15	Sydmors IF	10	1993
16	Sundby BK	9	2023
17	Varde IF (Note: Varde IF merged with Esbjerg fB in 2025.)	9	2018
18	Vorup	9	2000
19	**FC Nordsjælland** (Note: From 1994–2020, the club competed as Farum BK.)	8	2027
20	Viborg FF (Note: Six seasons in the top-flight as part of Team Viborg, while Team Viborg without Viborg FF had two seasons in the top tier. The history of the teams were united following the 2023 merger under the Viborg FF organisation.)	8	2015
21	**HB Køge**	7	2027
22	Næstved HG (Note: A merger of Herlufsholm GF (HG) and Næstved IF, the club previously competed in the top flight as Næstved IF.)	7	1986
23	AaB	7	2024
24	Frederiksberg BK (Note: Frederiksberg Boldklub competed from 2001–2004 as FV Copenhagen, a merger with Vanløse IF.)	6	2004
25	Herning IK	6	
26	Ribe	6	1980
27	FC Thy-Thisted Q	6	2024
28	G&IF Orient	5	1979
29	Herrested IF	5	1981
30	Uhre G&IF	5	1984
31	Virum-Sorgenfri BK	5	1984
32	B.93 (Note: B.93 competed in the top flight from 2012–2014 as part of a merger with Hellerup IK and BK Skjold.)	4	2025
33	Horsens SIK	4	2005
34	Nakskov BK	4	1982
35	Roskilde BK	4	1987
36	SønderjyskE	4	2012
37	BK Skjold	3	2011
38	Brande IF	3	1980
39	Sønderborg BK	3	1984
40	Taastrup FC (Note: Dissolved following the club's third season in the top-flight.)	3	2014
41	**ASA Fodbold**	2	2027
42	Bispebjerg BK	2	1979
43	B 1921	2	2003
44	**FC Copenhagen** (Note: Copenhagen took over FC Damsø's license.)	2	2027
45	IF Fladså	2	1986
46	FV Copenhagen (Note: Not affiliated with FC Copenhagen; FV is for Frederiksberg and Vanløse, respectively.)	2	2004
47	BK Mariendal	2	1977
48	**FC Midtjylland**	2	2027
49	Aarby G&IF	2	1981
50	Billum IF	1	1975
51	B 1913	1	2013
52	Frigg Næstved	1	1991
53	Glamsbjerg IF	1	1979
54	Greve Fodbold	1	1989
55	Grønbjerg IF	1	1992
56	Herlev IF	1	1978
57	Holstebro KFUM	1	1977
58	KFUM Copenhagen	1	1980
59	NB Bornholm	1	1978
60	Nørre Aaby IK	1	1980
61	Roerslev IF	1	1976
62	Skive IK	1	1979
63	Svaneke BK	1	1980
64	BK Syd-Vest	1	1978
65	Tuse IF	1	1975
66	Tved BK	1	1975
67	Vejlby IK (Note: Is now a part of AGF, but had one independent top-flight season while AGF's mainline club IK Skovbakken also played in the top flight.)	1	2009

- Sources: Danish Football Association (in Danish), Denmark A-Liga - Statistics | Tipsbladet.dk (in Danish)

=== Derbies ===
The most common derbies exist either between the biggest cities in the country (as they tend to be represented in the league) or the most successful in the league, the latter of which has changed over the decades.

For the first few years before the league was established, Ribe BK and BK Stjernen faced off in the finals tournament from 1972–1974. Ribe continued staking their claim on Danish football with the establishment of the league in 1975, reaching four out of six finals until the league was collated into one division from 1981. However, the strongest team in the early days of the league were pioneers BK Femina which reached every single final from 1975 to 1980. The new league saw Aarhus team HEI dominate the 1980s and early '90s, winning the league 8 times, 6 of them in a row from 1986–1991. HEI's closest competitors were Funen outfit B 1909 which took home the league trophy four times between 1981 and 1992. The 1993 creation of the new top-flight, The Elite Division, saw Fortuna Hjørring come to the fore winning the league four times in the '90s, while stalwarts HEI became their fiercest rivals.

In the '00s, the rivalry between Fortuna and Brøndby was consolidated, albeit with Brøndby claiming the most success winning the league six times in a row, as HEI had done two decades prior, where Fortuna won the league thrice. This rivalry has continued to dominate the league through the 2010s and 2020s. The arrival of HB Køge in the 2020s, however, has thrown a wrench into the bilateral dominance of the league, as has the general level of the clubs improving, making the league increasingly competitive. With the founding of Copenhagen in 2024, the first Copenhagen derby will take place in the 2026–27 A-Liga.

Regional

- Battle of Jutland – Aalborg BK v Aarhus GF
- Battle of Northern Jutland – Fortuna Hjørring v FC Thy-Thisted Q v Aalborg BK
- Battle of Funen: B 1909 v OB Q
- Battle of Aarhus – Aarhus GF v ASA
- Copenhagen derby – chiefly Brøndby v Copenhagen (New Firm).
  - Brøndby v Copenhagen
  - B.93 v Copenhagen

Historic (1970s–1990s)

- Ribe v BK Stjernen
- Ribe v BK Femina
- HEI v B 1909
- HEI v Fortuna

Classic (2000s–)

- Fortuna v Brøndby

Recent (2020s–)

- HB Køge v Brøndby
- HB Køge v Fortuna

== Hall of Fame members ==
The Danish Football Hall of Fame was created in 2006 to celebrate the achievements and contributions of outstanding Danish players and staff. Six total players have been inducted into the Danish Football Hall of Fame, two of whom have also managed clubs in the Danish top tier A-Liga, as well as one male former A-Liga coach.

#	Recipient	Year	Club(s)
1	Lone Smidt Nielsen	2016	B1909 (1978–85; 1987–90), Kolding IF (1976–78)
2	Katrine Pedersen	2022	Hjortshøj-Egå (HEI)/IK Skovbakken (1994–02)
3	Helle Jensen	2024	B52/Aalborg FC, B1909 (1989–94), Fortuna Hjørring (1994–00)
4	Merete Pedersen	2024	Vejle B, OB
5	Poul Højmose	2025	Hjortshøj-Egå (HEI)
6	Lene Terp	2025	PLAYER: Vejle B (1993–1996), OB (1997–01; 2002–03); MANAGER: KoldingQ (2013–16), Fortuna Hjørring (2023–2026)
7	Bonny Madsen	2026	BK Rødovre (1992–95)

== Awards ==
=== Player of the Year ===
The player of the season is chosen by the players in the league by vote and awarded by the trade union Spillerforeningen.

Season (Note: Before the 2017-18 season, the award was awarded for the calendar year.)	Player	Club	Ref.
2025–26	(Denmark) Mille Gejl	HB Køge	
2024–25	(Nigeria) Joy Omewa	Fortuna Hjørring	
2023–24	(Denmark) Sarah Dyrehauge	AGF	
2022–23	(Denmark) Nanna Christiansen	Brøndby	
2021–22	(United States) Kyra Carusa	HB Køge	
2020–21	(Denmark) Olivia Holdt	Fortuna Hjørring	
2019–20	(Denmark) Nanna Christiansen	Brøndby	
2018–19	(Denmark) Nanna Christiansen	Brøndby	
2017–18	(Denmark) Stine Sandbech	Brøndby	
2016	(Romania) Florentina Olar	Fortuna Hjørring	

== See also ==
- B-Liga
- C-Liga
- Danish Women's Cup
- Danish Women's Football League
