= Islev =

Coordinates: 55.7056°N 12.4400°E

Islev is a suburb, located approximately 10 km (6.2 mi) west of central Copenhagen, Denmark. The suburb consists of single-family detached houses and a commercial area. The suburb is connected to Copenhagen by the S-train. Islev railway station is located just east of the border between Islev and Vanløse, just outside Islev itself.

Islev Church is a brick church in the suburb, built in 1970 by architects Inger and Johannes Exner.
