= Boldklubben Femina =

Danish football club

BK Femina
- Full name: Boldklubben Femina
- Founded: 13 October 1959; 67 years ago
- Dissolved: 2015
- Ground: Gladsaxe Stadium
- Capacity: 13,800
- Owner: Femina
Home colours	Away colours

Boldklubben Femina (also known as BK Femina or Femina) was a Danish women's association football club based in Gladsaxe, Denmark. The club was founded in 1959 and played in white. It has been defunct since 2015. Femina made Danish footballing history as the winners of the 1970 World Cup where the club represented Denmark in an unofficial capacity given that the Danish Football Association refused to acknowledge a women's national team or women's football overall. Domestically the club largely played in the top-tier, A-Liga, winning the league three times, including the first league year in 1975.

== History ==
In Autumn 1959 Alf Mørkeberg, a journalist from Femina women's magazine, was sent to cover an exhibition match played by student nurses in Slagelse. Impressed by the level of play, Mørkeberg decided to form a permanent team and recruited several of the nurses, who had usually played handball. A meeting was held at the magazine's offices in Valby on 13 October 1959 to draw up the articles of association.

The new club's name, kit, boots and travelling expenses were supplied by Femina. The magazine, published since 1874, had changed its name from Nordisk Mønster Tidende to Femina in 1952. Mørkeberg penned a weekly column in the magazine and enlisted the help of experienced male coaches to train the team. Although the magazine withdrew all financial support and coverage in 1962, the team continued to attract sponsors and media attention. In 1968 the club toured Czechoslovakia and acquired two leading Czech players Marie Ševčíková and Jana Mandíková who defected from the communist regime.

In 1969 a privately funded governing body, Fédération Internationale Européenne de Football Féminine (FIEFF), invited BK Femina to a four-team Coppa Europa per Nazioni (European Cup) competition in northern Italy that November. Despite the presence of the Czech players BK Femina were to represent Denmark. With accommodation and rail travel provided by sponsors Martini & Rossi, BK Femina met an unofficial England XI at Aosta Valley in the north-west corner of Italy. Although captain Sue Lopez scored a hat-trick, the English were defeated 4–3. The following day at the Stadio Comunale in Turin, a 10,000 crowd saw England beat France 2–0 in the third place play-off, then BK Femina lose 3–1 to the host country in the final.

In summer 1970 FIEFF invited the club to represent Denmark again, this time in a Coppa del Mondo (World Cup) tournament. The team had to wear AC Milan shirts when their usual white ones were lost in transit. After reaching the final at the Stadio Comunale again, they took revenge on Italy and won 2–0 before 40,000 spectators. FIEFF's next tournament was the 1971 Mundial, held in Mexico, which was won by a Denmark team selected from the whole country.

The Faxe Brewery had sponsored BK Femina with DKK4,000 during the second part of 1970 and DKK10,000 in 1971. In 1972, under instruction from UEFA, the Dansk Boldspil-Union (DBU) took control of women's football in Denmark. As all Danish domestic football remained strictly amateur, the sponsorship deals which had driven BK Femina's success were prohibited.

In 2009 the club celebrated its 50th anniversary. At the time, the team was playing regional seven–a–side football under the auspices of DBU Zealand.

== Honours ==
- Danish champions (3): 1975, 1977, 1980
- World Cup (1): 1970

== Managers ==
Incomplete

Years	Coach
1980–	(Denmark) Lis Westberg Pedersen
	(Denmark) Erik Hansen
1959–1961	(Denmark) Henning Jensen
1959	(Denmark) Per Henriksen

== Seasons ==
Key
(gold) Champions	Promotion
(silver) Silver	Relegation
(bronze) Bronze	Championship Final

Incomplete

Season	Tier	#	W	D	L	F	A	Pts.	Cup
DIVISION WEST (2nd of 2) (Note: The league was originally divided into two groups of 10 teams, representing the east and the west of the country.)									
1975	1	1st of 20							
1976	1	1st of 10				48	4		
1977	1	1st of 20							
1978	1	1st of 10							
1979	1	1st of 10							
1980	1	1st of 20							
SINGLE-DIVISION LEAGUE (Note: From the 1981 season onwards, the league was changed to a single division encompassing the 12 best teams from across the country.)
1981	1	2nd of 12							
1982	1								
1983	1								
1984	1								
1985	1								
1986	1								
1987	1								
1988	1								
1989	1								
1990	1								

== Bibliography ==
- Fan, Hong; Mangan, J.A. (2003). "Women's Football in Denmark". Soccer, Women, Sexual Liberation: Kicking Off a New Era. Routledge. ISBN 978-0714684086.
- Marcovits, Andrei S.; Rensmann, Lars (2010). "A Silent "Feminization" of Global Sports Cultures? Women as Soccer Players in Europe and America". Gaming the World: How Sports Are Reshaping Global Politics and Culture. Princeton University Press. ISBN 978-0691137513.
