= 2025–26 Brøndby IF (women) season =

Brøndby IF
2025–26 season
- Owner: Global Football Holdings
- Chairman: Jan Bech Andersen
- Manager: Bengt Sæternes
- Stadium: 1964 Park
- A-Liga: 2nd
- Danish Cup: Semi-finals
- Top goalscorer: League: Hafrún Rakel Halldórsdóttir (7); All: Nanna Christiansen (9)
- Highest home attendance: 6,128 (v. AGF, A-Liga, 19 October 2025)
- Biggest win: 7–0 v. Sundby (A); Danish Cup, 3 September 2025; 7–0 v. BSF (A); Danish Cup, 7 October 2025
- Biggest defeat: 0–2 v. Fortuna Hjørring (A); A-Liga, 11 October 2025
Home colours	Away colours

The 2025–26 season was the 55th season in the history of Brøndby IF, and the club's 26th consecutive season in the A-Liga. In addition to the domestic league, the club also participated in the Danish Cup.

Nanna Christiansen became the season's top scorer in all competitions, in her final season for the club and as a footballer.

Captain and club mainstay Julie Tavlo Petersson retired from football before the championship campaign in the spring, with Kamilla Karlsen succeeding her as captain.

== First team squad ==
Players' ages are as of the opening day of the 2025–26 season.

No.	Player	Nationality	Position	Date of birth (age)	Signed from	Signed in	Contract ends	Notes
Goalkeepers
16	Mira Pastoft	(Denmark)	GK	7 May 1999 (aged 26)	Næstved HG	2025		
32	Jalen Tompkins	(United States)	GK	14 February 1997 (aged 28)	Vålerenga	2025	2026	
40	Isabella Damm	(Denmark)	GK	8 April 2008 (aged 17)		2021		
Defenders
3	Tanja Myrseth	(Norway)	CB	26 June 1997 (aged 28)	Lyn Fotball	2024		
4	Julie Madsen	(Denmark)	CB	25 July 2002 (aged 23)	B.93	2022	2026	
5	Emma Braut Brunes	(Norway)	CB	16 October 2003 (aged 21)	Kolbotn	2025		
18	Malin Brenn	(Norway)	CB	13 March 1999 (aged 26)	Linköping	2026	2027	
23	Emilie Fink	(Denmark)	RB	30 September 2004 (aged 20)	FC Thy-Thisted Q	2025		
31	Evelina Thygesen	(Denmark)	LB	23 April 2009 (aged 16)				
Midfielders
6	Julie Jorde	(Norway)	DM	16 April 2004 (aged 21)	Bayer Leverkusen	2025		
8	Mathilde Rasmussen	(Denmark)	AM	22 September 2002 (aged 22)	AGF	2025		
11	Cecilie Buchberg	(Denmark)	CM	11 December 1995 (aged 29)	HB Køge	2021		
12	Kamilla Karlsen (c)	(Denmark)	DM	7 May 2000 (aged 25)	Djurgården	2024		
13	Martyna Brodzik	(Poland)	CM	7 July 2001 (aged 24)	Pogoń Szczecin	2025		
27	Emilie Holt	(Denmark)	CM	27 January 2007 (aged 18)	HB Køge	2026	2028	
29	Selma Karstensen	(Denmark)	CM	7 January 2008 (aged 17)	Nordsjælland			
30	Caroline Thane-Bisgaard	(Denmark)	CM	6 March 2008 (aged 17)				
37	Mila Bischoff	(Denmark)	CM	1 July 2009 (aged 16)	Nordsjælland	2024	2027	
Attackers
7	Mathilde Carstens	(Denmark)	LW	7 March 2002 (aged 23)	Celtic	2025		
9	Nanna Christiansen	(Denmark)	ST	17 June 1989 (aged 36)	B.93	2014		
10	Dajan Hashemi	(Denmark)	FW	21 November 2000 (aged 24)	Sassuolo	2023	2026	
14	Hafrún Rakel Halldórsdóttir	(Iceland)	RW	1 October 2002 (aged 22)	Breiðablik	2024	2027	
15	Agnete Nielsen	(Denmark)	ST	15 April 1999 (aged 26)	Vålerenga	2023		
19	Julie Hoff Klæboe	(Norway)	ST	11 July 1999 (aged 26)	Røa IL	2025		
20	Chiara Messerli	(Switzerland)	FW	15 January 2001 (aged 24)	Molde FK	2026		
22	Tilde Lindwall	(Sweden)	RW	24 August 2001 (aged 23)	Vålerenga	2026	2027	
28	Linnéa Borbye	(Denmark)	FW	15 March 2001 (aged 24)	Sundby Boldklub	2023	2027	
33	Lilli Halttunen	(Finland)	ST	1 July 2005 (aged 20)	Linköping	2026	2028	
–	Melanie Frandsen	(Denmark)	FW	17 March 2008 (aged 17)	Greve Fodbold	2022		
Players who left the club mid-season
17	Julie Tavlo Petersson	(Denmark)	CB	20 October 1989 (aged 35)	Logroño	2021		Retired
~~20~~	Laura Faurskov	(Denmark)	FW	29 November 2002 (aged 22)	AGF	2025		Transferred to Napoli
21	Signe Carstens	(Denmark)	CM	7 March 2002 (aged 23)	AIK	2025		Transferred to Fortuna Hjørring
24	Ingibjörg Sigurdardóttir	(Iceland)	CB	7 October 1997 (aged 27)	MSV Duisburg	2024		Transferred to SC Freiburg
26	Andrea Friis	(Denmark)	CB	8 March 2006 (aged 19)		2021		Transferred to HB Køge
–	Frederikke Bruun	(Denmark)	CB	30 September 2005 (aged 19)	Brøndby U-19	2024		Transferred to FC Thy-Thisted Q

== Transfers ==
=== Transfers in ===
Date	Position	Nationality	Player	From	Fee	Ref.
14 July 2025 (Note: Fink's transfer was announced on 20 June 2025.)	CM	(Denmark)	Emilie Fink	(Denmark) FC Thy-Thisted Q	Undisclosed	
14 July 2025 (Note: Jorde's transfer was announced on 28 June 2025.)	CM	(Norway)	Julie Jorde	(Germany) Bayer Leverkusen	Undisclosed	
18 July 2025	AM	(Denmark)	Mathilde Carstens	(Scotland) Celtic	Undisclosed	
25 July 2025	AM	(Denmark)	Mathilde Rasmussen	(Denmark) AGF	Undisclosed	
8 August 2025	GK	(Denmark)	Mira Pastoft	(Denmark) Næstved HG	Undisclosed	
6 January 2026	FW	(Switzerland)	Chiara Messerli	(Norway) Molde FK	Undisclosed	
9 January 2026	ST	(Finland)	Lilli Halttunen	(Sweden) Linköping	Undisclosed	
19 January 2026	CM	(Denmark)	Emilie Holt	(Denmark) HB Køge	Undisclosed	
23 January 2026	RW	(Sweden)	Tilde Lindwall	(Norway) Vålerenga	Undisclosed	
25 January 2026	CB	(Norway)	Malin Brenn	(Sweden) Linköping	Undisclosed	

=== Loans out ===
Date	Position	Nationality	Player	To	Date until	Ref.
1 January 2025 (Note: The Swedish league runs through the calendar year.)	CB	(Denmark)	Frederikke Bruun	(Sweden) Värnamo	31 December 2025	

=== Transfers out ===
Date	Position	Nationality	Player	To	Fee	Ref.
19 June 2025	CM	(Denmark)	Mathilde Hagihara	(Denmark) B.93	–	
19 June 2025	CM	(Denmark)	Mie Leth Jans	Retired	Released	
23 June 2025 (Note: Hornemann's departure from Brøndby was announced on 19 June 2025)	FW	(Denmark)	Sofie Hornemann	(France) Saint-Étienne	Undisclosed	
26 June 2025 (Note: Dilfer's departure from Brøndby was announced on 19 June 2025)	GK	(Germany)	Ann-Kathrin Dilfer	(Denmark) Copenhagen	Undisclosed	
30 June 2025	CM	(Denmark)	Laura Hermann	(France) Saint-Étienne	Undisclosed	
13 July 2025 (Note: Schulz's departure from Brøndby was announced on 19 June 2025)	CM	(Denmark)	Carla Schulz	(Denmark) OB Q	Undisclosed	
19 July 2025 (Note: Larsen's departure from Brøndby was announced on 19 June 2025)	CM	(Denmark)	Camille Larsen	(Denmark) Kolding IF	Undisclosed	
24 July 2025 (Note: Baskaya's departure from Brøndby was announced on 19 June 2025)	CB	(Denmark)	Meryem Baskaya	(Denmark) OB Q	Undisclosed	
12 August 2025	CB	(Iceland)	Ingibjörg Sigurdardóttir	(Germany) SC Freiburg	Undisclosed	
11 January 2026	AM	(Denmark)	Laura Faurskov	(Italy) Napoli	Undisclosed	
2 February 2026	CM	(Denmark)	Signe Carstens	(Denmark) Fortuna Hjørring	Released	
24 February 2026	CB	(Denmark)	Frederikke Bruun	(Denmark) FC Thy-Thisted Q	Undisclosed	
9 March 2026	CB	(Denmark)	Julie Tavlo Petersson	Retired		

== Pre-season ==
Win Draw Loss Void Fixtures

22 July 2025 Friendly	B.93	v	Brøndby	Vanløse, Denmark
18:00 UTC+2				Stadium: Vanløse Idrætspark

22 July 2025 Friendly	Brøndby U-19	v	Brøndby	Vanløse, Denmark
18:00 UTC+2				Stadium: 1964 Park

26 July 2025 Friendly	SK Brann	3–2	Brøndby	Bergen, Norway
13:00 UTC+2				Stadium: Brann Stadion

2 August 2025 Friendly	Vittsjö GIK	2–3	Brøndby	Vittsjö, Sweden
13:00 UTC+2				Stadium: Vittsjö IP

Source: Brøndby IF website

== Competitions ==
=== Overall record ===
Competition	First match	Last match	Starting round	Record							
Competition	First match	Last match	Starting round	Pld	W	D	L	GF	GA	GD	Win %
A-Liga	August 2025	June 2026	Matchday 1	24	14	8	2	39	16	+23	58.33
Danish Cup	September 2025	May 2026	Second round	5	3	1	1	19	5	+14	60.00
Total				29	17	9	3	58	21	+37	58.62

Source: FotMob

=== A-Liga ===
==== Championship table ====
Pos	Team	Pld	W	D	L	GF	GA	GD	Pts	Qualification
1	HB Køge (C)	10	6	3	1	50	22	+28	53	Champions League second qualifying round
2	Brøndby	10	8	2	0	39	16	+23	50	Champions League second qualifying round
3	Fortuna Hjørring	10	4	0	6	37	21	+16	41	Europa Cup first qualifying round
4	Nordsjælland	10	4	4	2	47	26	+21	37	
5	AGF	10	0	2	8	26	34	−8	26	

Source: Danish Football Association (in Danish)
Rules for classification: 1) Points; 2) Goal difference; 3) Goals scored; 4) Away goals scored; 5) Play-off (played on neutral ground if determining teams for different rounds); 6) Draw.
(C) Champions

==== Results summary ====
Overall								Home						Away					
Pld	W	D	L	GF	GA	GD	Pts	W	D	L	GF	GA	GD	W	D	L	GF	GA	GD
24	14	8	2	39	16	+23	50	7	5	0	20	5	+15	7	3	2	19	11	+8

Source: FotMob

==== Results by round ====
Round	1	2	3	4	5	6	7	8	9	10	11	12	13	14	15	16	17	18	19	20	21	22	23	24
Ground	H	A	A	H	A	A	H	H	A	H	A	H	A	H	A	H	A	H	A	H	A	H	A	H
Result	D	D	L	W	D	W	W	D	L	W	W	D	W	D	W	D	W	W	W	W	W	W	D	W
Position	6	5	5	5	5	4	3	3	4	3	3	3	3	3			3	2	2	2	2	2	2	2
Points	1	2	2	5	6	9	12	13	13	16	19	20	23	24	27	28	31	34	37	40	43	46	47	50

Source: Danish Football Association (in Danish)
A = Away; H = Home; W = Win; D = Draw; L = Loss; P = Postponed

==== Matches ====
9 August 2025 1	Brøndby	0–0	Fortuna Hjørring	Brøndby
16:00 UTC+2		Report		Stadium: 1964 Park; Referee: Philip Warburg

17 August 2025 2	AGF	1–1	Brøndby	Aarhus
12:00 UTC+2	Johansen 23' (pen.)	Report	Fink 19'	Stadium: Ceres Park Vejlby; Referee: Frederikke Søkjær

23 August 2025 3	HB Køge	3–2	Brøndby	Køge
16:00 UTC+2	Gejl 35'; Thygesen 90'; Garcia 90+5'		Rasmussen 10'; Halldórsdóttir 81'	Stadium: Køge Stadium

7 September 2025 4	Brøndby	4–0	OB Q	Brøndby
12:00 UTC+2	Nielsen 20', 82'; Rasmussen 49'; Jorde 62'	Report		Stadium: 1964 Park; Referee: Frederikke Lydia Søkjær

13 September 2025 5	Nordsjælland	0–0	Brøndby	Farum
18:00 UTC+2		Report		Stadium: Right to Dream Park; Referee: Alex Petersen

21 September 2025 6	FC Midtjylland	2–3	Brøndby	Vildbjerg
12:00 UTC+2	Rathe 10'; Troelsgaard 90'	Report	Borbye 14'; Pauludan 38'; Christiansen 89'	Stadium: Vildbjerg Sports Centre; Referee: Benjamin Seferovic

27 September 2025 7	Brøndby	2–1	Kolding	Brøndby
13:00 UTC+2	Rasmussen 24'; Faurskov 52'	Report	Wendicke 16'	Stadium: 1964 Park; Referee: Frederikke Lydia Søkjær

3 October 2025 8	Brøndby	0–0	FC Nordsjælland	Brøndby
19:00 UTC+2		Report		Stadium: 1964 Park; Referee: Rie Louise Rasmussen

11 October 2025 9	Fortuna Hjørring	2–0	Brøndby	Hjørring
15:00 UTC+2	Ogochukwu 65' (pen.); Olar 90'	Report		Stadium: Nord Energi Arena; Referee: Julie Alsbro Thomsen

19 October 2025 10	Brøndby	3–0	AGF	Brøndby
12:30 UTC+2	Tavlo 2'; Hashemi 43'; Fink 45'	Report		Stadium: Brøndby Stadium; Attendance: 6,128; Referee: Frederikke Lydia Søkjær
Note: The match broke the record for largest viewership for an A-Liga match with 63,000 people watching on TV 2.

2 November 2025 11	OB Q	0–3	Brøndby	Odense
12:00 UTC+1		Report	Christiansen 4', 45'; Halldórsdóttir 90+3'	Stadium: Nature Energy Park; Referee: Zascha A. Sparving

8 November 2025 12	Brøndby	1–1	HB Køge	Brøndby
15:00 UTC+1	Evelina Thygesen 90'	Report	Uhre 52'	Stadium: 1964 Park; Referee: Frida Klarlund

16 November 2025 13	Kolding	0–1	Brøndby	Kolding
13:00 UTC+1		Report	Halldórsdóttir 61'	Stadium: Kolding Stadium; Referee: Philip Warburg

22 November 2025 14	Brøndby	1–1	FC Midtjylland	Brøndby
14:00 UTC+1	Halldórsdóttir 31'	Report	Rejkjær 35'	Stadium: 1964 Park; Referee: Zascha A. Sparving

15 March 2026 15	Fortuna Hjørring	1–2	Brøndby	Hjørring
12:00 UTC+2	Olar 72'	Report	Halldórsdóttir 24'; Halttunen 90'	Stadium: Nord Energi Arena; Referee: Patrick Remon Gammelholm

21 March 2026 16	Brøndby	0–0	HB Køge	Brøndby
14:00 UTC+2		Report		Stadium: 1964 Park; Referee: Julie Alsbro Thomsen

29 March 2026 17	Kolding	0–3	Brøndby	Kolding
12:00 UTC+2		Report	Lindwall 42'; Halldórsdóttir 53'; Borbye 83'	Stadium: Kolding Stadium; Referee: Julie Alsbro Thomsen

5 April 2026 18	Brøndby	1–0	FC Nordsjælland	Brøndby
14:00 UTC+2	Karlsen 43' (pen.)	Report		Stadium: 1964 Park; Referee: Frederikke Lydia Søkjær

28 April 2026 19	AGF	0–1	Brøndby	Aarhus
19:00 UTC+2		Report	Lindwall 21'	Stadium: Ceres Park Vejlby; Referee: Jacob Rasmussen

3 May 2026 20	Brøndby	2–0	Fortuna Hjørring	Brøndby
11:30 UTC+2	Halldórsdóttir 7'; Bischoff 69'	Report		Stadium: 1964 Park; Referee: Frida Klarlund

9 May 2026 21	HB Køge	0–1	Brøndby	Køge
16:00 UTC+2		Report	Bischoff 17'	Stadium: Køge Stadium; Referee: Mahsa Ghorbani

22 May 2026 22	Brøndby	3–2	Kolding	Brøndby
19:00 UTC+2	Brenn 17'; Nielsen 65', 76'	Report	Amalie Lund 33'; Ludvigsen 54'	Stadium: 1964 Park; Referee: Kasper Madsen

30 May 2026 23	Nordsjælland	2–2	Brøndby	Farum
14:00 UTC+2	Marfo 6'; Højer 90+6'	Report	Jorde 18'; Christiansen 79'	Stadium: Right to Dream Park; Referee: Mahsa Ghorbani

13 June 2026 24	Brøndby	3–0	AGF	Brøndby
16:00 UTC+2	Nielsen 5', 14'; Julie Mathiasen 54' (o.g.)	Report		Stadium: 1964 Park; Referee: Zascha A. Sparving

=== Danish Cup ===
Brøndby entered the competition in the second round.

Win Draw Loss Fixtures

3 September 2025 Second round	Sundby BK	0–7	Brøndby	Copenhagen
18:30 UTC+2		Report	Christiansen 10', 19' (pen.), 38' (pen.); Bischoff 14', 38'; Jorde 28'; Thane-Bisgaard 80'	Stadium: Kløvermarkens Idrætsanlæg; Referee: Faridoon Razi

7 October 2025 Third round	BSF	0–7	Brøndby	Ballerup
19:00 UTC+2		Report	Jorde 3'; Christiansen 9', 20'; Rasmussen 40', 42'; A. Nielsen 90'; Borbye 92'	Stadium: Ballerup Idrætspark; Referee: Zascha A. Sparving

7 December 2025 Quarter-finals	ASA Fodbold	0–3	Brøndby IF	Aarhus
14:00 UTC+1		Report	K. Karlsen 2'; Halldórsdóttir 16'; A. Nielsen 30'	Stadium: ASA Grounds; Referee: Philip Warburg

25 March 2026 Semi-finals (1 of 2)	HB Køge	1–1	Brøndby IF	Køge
17:00 UTC+2	Boye 11'	Report	Borbye 15'	Stadium: Capelli Sports Stadium; Referee: Julie Alsbro Thomsen

2 April 2026 Semi-finals (2 of 2)	Brøndby IF	1–4 (2–5 agg.)	HB Køge	Brøndby
15:00 UTC+2	Buchberg 84'	Report	C. Paulson 2'; Gejl 20'; Schultz 47'; Thygesen 80'	Stadium: 1964 Park; Referee: Philip Warburg

== Statistics ==
=== Appearances and goals ===
No.	Pos.	Nat.	Player	League		Cup		Total	
No.	Pos.	Nat.	Player	Apps	Goals	Apps	Goals	Apps	Goals
3	CB	(Norway)	Tanja Myrseth	4 (1)	0	0 (2)	0	4 (3)	0
4	CB	(Denmark)	Julie Madsen	17 (6)	1	5	0	22 (6)	1
5	CB	(Norway)	Emma Braut Brunes	12 (1)	0	3	0	15 (1)	0
6	CM	(Norway)	Julie Jorde	19 (1)	2	5	2	24 (1)	4
7	AM	(Denmark)	Mathilde Carstens	0 (3)	0	0	0	0 (3)	0
8	AM	(Denmark)	Mathilde Rasmussen	10	3	1	2	11	5
9	AM	(Denmark)	Nanna Christiansen	12 (11)	4	2 (2)	5	14 (13)	9
10	FW	(Denmark)	Dajan Hashemi	21 (1)	1	4	0	25 (1)	1
11	CM	(Denmark)	Cecilie Buchberg	1 (7)	0	0 (1)	1	1 (8)	1
12	CB	(Denmark)	Kamilla Karlsen	19 (4)	1	4 (1)	1	25 (5)	2
13	CM	(Poland)	Martyna Brodzik	0 (1)	0	0	0	0 (1)	0
14	CM	(Iceland)	Hafrún Rakel Halldórsdóttir	11 (9)	7	4 (1)	1	15 (10)	8
15	FW	(Denmark)	Agnete Nielsen	11 (12)	6	2 (2)	2	13 (14)	8
16	GK	(Denmark)	Mira Pastoft	0	0	0	0	0	0
17	CM	(Denmark)	Julie Tavlo Petersson	10 (2)	1	2	0	12 (2)	1
18	CB	(Norway)	Malin Brenn	9	1	2	0	11	1
19	FW	(Norway)	Julie Hoff Klæboe	0 (1)	0	0	0	0 (1)	0
20	FW	(Switzerland)	Chiara Messerli	3 (3)	0	2	0	5 (3)	0
21	CM	(Denmark)	Signe Carstens	2 (3)	0	1 (2)	0	3 (5)	0
22	FW	(Sweden)	Tilde Lindwall	9	2	1	0	10	2
23	CM	(Denmark)	Emilie Fink	14	2	0	0	14	2
26	CB	(Denmark)	Andrea Friis	0	0	0	0	0	0
27	CM	(Denmark)	Emilie Holt	3 (3)	0	0 (2)	0	3 (5)	0
28	FW	(Sweden)	Linnéa Borbye	21 (3)	2	3 (2)	2	24 (5)	4
29	CM	(Denmark)	Selma Karstensen	0	0	1	0	1	0
30	CM	(Denmark)	Caroline Thane-Bisgaard	0 (1)	0	1 (1)	1	1 (2)	1
31	CB	(Denmark)	Evelina Thygesen	7 (4)	1	1 (1)	0	8 (5)	1
32	GK	(United States)	Jalen Tompkins	24	0	2	0	26	0
33	FW	(Finland)	Lilli Halttunen	2 (2)	1	2	0	4 (2)	1
36	FW	(Denmark)	Melanie Frandsen	0 (6)	0	0 (2)	0	0 (8)	0
37	CM	(Denmark)	Mila Bischoff	14 (10)	2	3 (2)	2	17 (12)	4
40	GK	(Denmark)	Isabella Damm	0 (1)	0	3	0	3 (1)	0
–	CM	(Norway)	Mathilde Brandt	0 (2)	0	0	0	0 (2)	0
–	FW	(Denmark)	Laura Høgh Faurskov	9 (5)	1	1 (1)	0	10 (4)	1

The number in parentheses denotes an appearance where the player is brought on as a substitute.

=== Goalscorers ===
No.	Pos.	Nat.	Player	AL	DC	Total
9	FW	(Denmark)	Nanna Christiansen	4	5	9
14	MF	(Iceland)	Hafrún Rakel Halldórsdóttir	7	1	8
15	FW	(Denmark)	Agnete Nielsen	6	2	8
8	MF	(Denmark)	Mathilde Rasmussen	3	2	5
37	MF	(Denmark)	Mila Bischoff	2	2	4
28	FW	(Sweden)	Linnéa Borbye	2	2	4
6	MF	(Norway)	Julie Jorde	2	2	4
23	MF	(Denmark)	Emilie Fink	2	0	2
22	FW	(Sweden)	Tilde Lindwall	2	0	2
12	MF	(Denmark)	Kamilla Karlsen	1	1	2
18	DF	(Norway)	Malin Brenn	1	0	1
20	FW	(Denmark)	Laura Faurskov	1	0	1
33	FW	(Finland)	Lilli Halttunen	1	0	1
10	MF	(Denmark)	Dajan Hashemi	1	0	1
4	DF	(Denmark)	Julie Madsen	1	0	1
17	DF	(Denmark)	Julie Tavlo	1	0	1
31	DF	(Denmark)	Evelina Thygesen	1	0	1
11	MF	(Denmark)	Cecilie Buchberg	0	1	1
30	MF	(Denmark)	Caroline Thane-Bisgaard	0	1	1
Opponent				1	0	1
Total				41	19	60

Source: FBREF

=== Discipline ===
No.	Pos.	Nat.	Player	AL		DC		Total		Pts
No.	Pos.	Nat.	Player	Yellow card	Red card	Yellow card	Red card	Yellow card	Red card	Pts
10	FW	(Denmark)	Dajan Hashemi	6	1	1	0	7	1	10
28	FW	(Sweden)	Linnéa Borbye	3	0	1	0	4	0	4
17	DF	(Denmark)	Julie Tavlo	0	1	0	0	0	1	3
6	MF	(Norway)	Julie Jorde	2	0	0	0	2	0	2
12	DF	(Denmark)	Kamilla Karlsen	2	0	0	0	2	0	2
4	DF	(Denmark)	Julie Madsen	1	0	1	0	2	0	2
5	DF	(Norway)	Emma Braut Brunes	1	0	0	0	1	0	1
8	MF	(Denmark)	Mathilde Rasmussen	1	0	0	0	1	0	1
–	FW	(Denmark)	Laura Høgh Faurskov	1	0	0	0	1	0	1
22	FW	(Sweden)	Tilde Lindwall	1	0	0	0	1	0	1
31	DF	(Denmark)	Evelina Thygesen	1	0	0	0	1	0	1
33	FW	(Finland)	Lilli Halttunen	1	0	0	0	1	0	1
–	DF	(Norway)	Mathilde Brandt	1	0	0	0	1	0	1
14	MF	(Iceland)	Hafrún Rakel Halldórsdóttir	0	0	1	0	1	0	1
Total				21	2	4	0	25	2	31

Source: FBREF

== Sources ==
- Brøndby IF
- Brøndby A-Liga - Danish Football Association
- Kvindepokalen 2025/26 – Danish Football Association
- Brøndby IF - FotMob
