= 2025–26 Danish Women's Cup =

Tournament details
- Country: Denmark
- Dates: 12 August 2025–16 May 2026
- Teams: 58

Final positions
- Champions: HB Køge (1st title)
- Runners-up: FC Nordsjælland

Tournament statistics
- Matches played: 58
- Goals scored: 344 (5.93 per match)
- Top goal scorer: Andrea Thierry (7 goals)

The 2025–26 Danish Women's Cup was the 33rd edition of the Danish Women's Cup.

F.C. Copenhagen made headlines in the first round when the team, who compete in the second tier B-Liga, beat seventh tier non-league opponents Frederiksberg Boldklub with double figures 23–0. Defending champions Fortuna Hjørring were seen off in the second round by newly promoted team FC Midtjylland.

The semi-finals were broadcast by the Danish Broadcasting Corporation (DR) on 25 March and 2 April 2026, and the finale was shown on 16 May 2026. HB Køge secured their first ever Danish Cup victory winning 4–1 against FC Nordsjælland.

This marks the first tournament in which the most valuable player of the cup final receives artwork by a female artist to symbolise the activism for equality inherent in women's sports.

== Teams ==
A total of 58 teams enter the 2025–26 Women's Cup. Six preliminary rounds take place in the non-league tiers (4–7) of the Danish football league system, overseen by the six respective regional departments of the Danish Football Association (DBU), culminating in 30 participating teams. 24 are from the A-Liga, B-Liga, and C-Liga play-offs of the previous season. For the second round, the six teams from the previous season's A-Liga championship play-offs join the competition to face the 26 winners of the first round.

Solrød FC exited the B-Liga in the spring of 2025 and dissolved the team due to a lack of players for the squad. The club's spot in the C-Liga play-offs was not filled, and instead awarded to the non-league qualification - therefore a total of 31 non-league teams compete in the cup where it is normally 30.

Phase	Entering	Advancing	Matches	Begins
First round (52 teams)	31 clubs from the non-league tiers (4–7); 10 clubs from the C-Liga play-offs; 5 clubs from B-Liga play-offs; 6 clubs from A-Liga play-offs	—N/a	26	12 August 2025
Second round (32 teams)	6 clubs from the A-Liga championship play-offs	26 winners from the first round	16	2 September 2025
Third round (16 teams)	—N/a	16 winners from the second round	8	30 September 2025
Quarter-finals (8 teams)	—N/a	8 winners from the third round	4	6 December 2025
Semi-finals (4 teams)	—N/a	4 winners from the quarter-finals	2	25 March 2026
Final (2 teams)	—N/a	2 winners from the semi-finals	1	16 May 2026

== First round ==
A total of 52 teams played in the first round: 21 teams from the previous season's qualification play-offs in the top three tiers; 10 from C-Liga (tier 3), 5 from B-Liga (tier 2) and 6 from A-Liga (tier 1); as well as 31 (Note: 30 teams from the non-leagues usually participate, but were awarded one C-Liga spot for the 2025-26 cup due to Solrød FC dissolving its team and departing the league mid-way through last season.) non-league teams that qualified for the tournament in the non-league qualifications taking place in the spring; 1 from Series 2 (tier 7), 4 from Series 1 (tier 6), 13 from the Women's Series Local (tier 5), and 13 from the Women's Series (tier 4).

Number of teams per tier still in the competition
1		2	3	4	5	6	7	Tier
A-Liga champ. (Note: The A-Liga championship play-off teams from the previous season join in the second round.)	A-Liga qual.	B-Liga qual.	C-Liga qual.	Women's Series	Women's Series Local	Series 1	Series 2	Total
6 / 6	6 / 6	5 / 5	10 / 10	13 / 13	13 / 13	4 / 4	1 / 1	58 / 58

12 August 2025	Vorup FB (4)	0–6	Vejgaard Boldklub (4)	Randers
18:30 UTC+2		Report	M. Jakobsen 4', 8', 55'; TBA 47' (o.g.); Høst 62'; Lauritsen 81'	Stadium: XL Park Vorup; Referee: Lasse Drachmann Pedersen

13 August 2025	Aalborg Chang (5)	1–8	Aalborg Freja (2)	Aalborg
18:30 UTC+2	Hessellund (?)	Report	Pedersen (?); Stefansen (?); L. Martens (?); N. Martens (?); Maiken Andersen (?)	Stadium: Sparekassen Danmark Park Aalborg; Referee: Michael Karstenskov

13 August 2025	Randers Q (4)	5–1	AaB (2)	Randers
18:30 UTC+2	Duun 12'; Mia Knudsen 37', 44'; Bech-Hansen 64' (pen.); Hjorth Hansen 90'	Report	Laura Grøn 45'	Stadium: Romalt Stadion; Referee: Frederik Sievers

13 August 2025	Ry Fodbold (5)	1–4	IF Lyseng (4)	Ry
18:30 UTC+2	Børglum 78'	Report	Grote 47', 86'; Linneberg 58'; Mygind Sørensen 89'	Stadium: Ry Fodbold Kunstgræsbane; Referee: Kenneth Martin Haurum

13 August 2025	Silkeborg IF Q (4)	0–1	Esbjerg fB (2)	Silkeborg
18:30 UTC+2		Report	Grønvall Andersen 36'	Stadium: Søholt Idrætsanlæg; Referee: Jimmi Breum

13 August 2025	Lemvig GF (4)	4–0	Brabrand IF (3)	Lemvig
18:30 UTC+2	Agger 42', 58'; Mortensen 56'; Baastrup 82'	Report		Stadium: Lemvig Stadion; Referee: Brian Alstrup Højgaard

13 August 2025	Aarhus 1900 (4)	1–9	FC Midtjylland (1)	Aarhus
18:30 UTC+2	Curran 45'	Report	Troelsgaard 14', 21'; Nautrup 16' (pen.), 33'; Givskov 29'; Dybdahl 42' (pen.); Olsen 55'; Rejkjær 81', 89'	Stadium: Fort Langenæs; Referee: Ebbe Storgaard Klaris Madsen

13 August 2025	JAI Fodbold (3)	2–10	ASA Fodbold (1)	Viby J
18:30 UTC+2	Skov 16' (pen.); Jepsen 86'	Report	Moss 5'; Linde 7', 45'; Fabricius Larsen 8'; Hedegaard 28', 29'; Ahrendtsen Jensen 34'; Fremo 38'; Hauge 83'; Schrøder 90'	Stadium: JAI's Anlæg; Referee: Callum McNeil

13 August 2025	Aarslev BK (5)	0–7	Dalum/Næsby (3)	Årslev
18:30 UTC+2		Report	Jørgensen 23'; Ørskov Jensen 27', 80'; Hoffmann Nielsen 44'; Á Fløtti Thomsen 49' (o.g.); Rosenkrans 66' (o.g.); Krebs 81'	Stadium: Sparekassen Danmark Arena Aarslev; Referee: Mikael Jensen

13 August 2025	Nørre Søby (6)	1–2	Issø F16 (5)	Årslev
18:30 UTC+2	Heinesen 72'	Report	Signe Larsen 6'; Henneberg 83'	Stadium: Nørre Søby Stadion; Referee: Casper Henriksen

13 August 2025	Fredericia KF/TSIF (5)	1–4	Haderslev FK (4)	Fredericia
18:30 UTC+2	H. Jakobsen 20'	Report	Ørnskov 4'; Rykær 29', 30'; Boel 74'	Stadium: Fredericia Idrætscenter; Referee: Kent Larsen

13 August 2025	Tårup IF (6)	0–4	OKS (5)	Frørup
18:30 UTC+2		Report	Nissen 22', 27'; Højholdt 48'; Nancke 66'	Stadium: Aage Pedersen & Søn Arena (Tårup); Referee: Mads Fraser-Jensen

13 August 2025	Bramming (5)	0–13	Kolding IF (1)	Bramming
18:30 UTC+2		Report	Camille Larsen 4'; Lund 13', 15', 17', 30'; Cecilie Christensen 15'; Fredsted 15'; Thierry 19', 30'; Knudsen Larsen (?); Uhd (?); Kynde (?)	Stadium: Skjern Bank Arena Bramming; Referee: Mathias Tang Jensen

13 August 2025	Svogerslev BK (4)	1–0	B 73 Slagelse (3)	Roskilde
18:30 UTC+2	Torp Jensen 21'	Report		Stadium: Svogerslev Idrætspark; Referee: Emilie Langthaler

13 August 2025	Nykøbing FC (4)	0–5	BSF (3)	Nykøbing Falster
18:30 UTC+2		Report	Foged Christensen 16', 34'; Godvin 27', 76'; Katja Larsen 65'	Stadium: Nykøbing FC; Referee: David Billekop Knudsen

13 August 2025	Lynge-Broby IF (5)	0–7	Næstved HG (2)	Sorø
18:30 UTC+2		Report	Krag-Andersen 9', 73'; Curts 31'; Neumann Andersen 43'; Lytting Petersen 66'; Santhirasegaram 84'; Novio Martinez 90'	Stadium: Frederiksberg Skole; Referee: Anders Bjarkov Petersen

13 August 2025	Føroyar (5)	0–3	B.93 (1)	Copenhagen
18:30 UTC+2		Report	Bruun 12'; Mejlgaard Larsen 46'; Frederikke Petersen 83'	Stadium: Kløvermarkens Idrætsanlæg; Referee: Linus Robinson

13 August 2025	BK Skjold (4)	1–0	BK Rødovre (4)	Copenhagen
18:30 UTC+2	Sølvborg 70'	Report		Stadium: Fælledparken; Referee: Tore Bredal Nygaard

13 August 2025	Snekkersten IF (5)	1–0	FA 2000 (5)	Snekkersten
18:30 UTC+2	M.A. Jakobsen 58'	Report		Stadium: Snekkersten Idrætscenter; Referee: Mollie Grønberg Petersen

13 August 2025	FB (7)	0–23	Copenhagen (2)	Frederiksberg
18:30 UTC+2		Report	S. Rasmussen 6', 76'; Rhode 9'; Kampmann 12'; Hovmark 15', 21', 23', 33', 42'; Bergmann 20', 52' (pen.); Hemmingsen 37', 44', 6', 66'; Troldborg 45'; Boisen 58'; Buhl 68' (o.g.); Wik 75', 86', 90'; Byrnak 80'; Benfeldt 90'	Stadium: Frederiksberg Idrætspark; Referee: Elo Christoffer Skaaning Sandersen

13 August 2025	Vordingborg IF (6)	1–11	Sundby BK (3)	Vordingborg
19:00 UTC+2	Bærentzen 4'	Report	Langhorn 6', 50'; Bøje 19', 34', 36', 67', 89'; Olabi 22'; Winther 48'; Thrane 56' (o.g.); Bagger 85'	Stadium: THUN Arena; Referee: Lars H. Jakobsen

14 August 2025	Fredensborg BI (3)	1–3	Østerbro IF (1)	Fredensborg
19:00 UTC+2	Gravlund Hansen 20'	Report	Weatherall 12'; Thyrrestrup 34'; Emilie Larsen 90'	Stadium: Fredensborg Stadium; Referee: Mie Lukassen Jørgensen

19 August 2025	Viborg FF (3)	1–2	FC Thy-Thisted Q (1)	Viborg
19:00 UTC+2	Smed 45'	Report	Naja Jensen 22'; Gaarn Hansen 50'	Stadium: Liseborg; Referee: Kenneth Velling

19 August 2025	PI Fodbold (5)	1–2	Brødeskov IF (5)	Copenhagen
20:00 UTC+2	Wad 38'	Report	Amalie Larsen 13'; Meyer 70'	Stadium: Valby Idrætspark; Referee: Dan Baagøe

20 August 2025	Jernløse/Holbæk (6)	1–8	Allerød Fodbold Klub (3)	Regstrup
18:30 UTC+2	Thorning 13'	Report	Folkersen 4', 10', 36'; Hannah Rasmussen 7', 63'; Hecksher 21'; Højen-Sørensen 24'; Amanda Nielsen 62'	Stadium: Jernløse Hallen; Referee: Anders Mainz

21 August 2025	HIK (4)	2–4	Ølstykke FC (3)	Hellerup
19:00 UTC+2	Philipsen 39'; ? 48'	Report	Pongkul 9', 37', 49'; Yde Andersen 10'	Stadium: HIK; Referee: Marcus Pedersen

Source: Danish Football Association

== Second round ==
A total of 32 teams played in the second round: the six A-Liga clubs from the previous season's championship play-offs (AGF, Brøndby IF, Fortuna Hjørring, HB Køge, FC Nordsjælland and OB Q) entered at this stage along with the 26 winners from the first round.

Number of teams per tier still in the competition
1		2	3	4	5	6	7	Tier
A-Liga champ.	A-Liga qual.	B-Liga	C-Liga	Women's Series	Women's Series Local	Series 1	Series 2	Total
6 / 6	6 / 6	4 / 5	5 / 10	7 / 13	4 / 13	0 / 4	0 / 1	32 / 58

2 September 2025	FC Thy-Thisted Q (1)	0–3	AGF (1)	Thisted
18:30 UTC+2		Report	Aarhus 35', 57'; Sundahl 77'	Stadium: Sparekassen Thy Arena; Referee: Lasse Ross Clausen

2 September 2025	Snekkersten IF (5)	0–1	BK Skjold (4)	Snekkersten
19:00 UTC+2		Report	Harritsø 13'	Stadium: Snekkersten Idrætscenter; Referee: Philip Goja Pilipovic

3 September 2025	FC Midtjylland (1)	2–0	Fortuna Hjørring (1)	Vildbjerg
16:30 UTC+2	Hougaard Jepsen 43'; Dybdahl 60'	Report		Stadium: Vildbjerg Sports- & Kulturcenter; Referee: Andreas Wittrup

3 September 2025	Svogerslev BK (4)	0–11	Kolding IF (1)	Roskilde
17:30 UTC+2		Report	Thierry 9', 38', 56', 73', 83'; Ludvigsen 14', 24', 88' (pen.); Madsen 23', 58'; Nordentoft 40'	Stadium: Svogerslev Idrætspark; Referee: Steen Jensen

3 September 2025	B.93 (1)	2–3	Copenhagen (2)	Vanløse
18:00 UTC+2	Vestfred 7'; Einlykke 73'	Report	Lech 42', 63'; Nowak 82'	Stadium: Vanløse Idrætspark; Referee: Morten Kuld Jacobsen

3 September 2025	Issø F16 (5)	1–6	Esbjerg fB (2)	Stenstrup
18:15 UTC+2	Kristensen 30'	Report	Kamp Jensen 31', 46'; Juelsgård 48'; Poulsen 66'; E. Lund 75'; Natasja Christiansen 81'	Stadium: Stenstrup Sportsplads; Referee: Kim (Kørelærer) Johansen

3 September 2025	Sundby BK (3)	0–7	Brøndby IF (1)	Copenhagen
18:30 UTC+2		Report	Christiansen 10', 19' (pen.), 38' (pen.); Bischoff 14', 38'; Jorde 28'; Thane-Bisgaard 80'	Stadium: Kløvermarkens Idrætsanlæg; Referee: Faridoon Razi

3 September 2025	Ølstykke FC (3)	0–6	Nordsjælland (1)	Ølstykke
18:30 UTC+2		Report	Krøll Jørgensen 5'; Elbehery 10', 66' (pen.); Tingager 50'; Mott 55'; Westberg 90'	Stadium: Ølstykke Stadium; Referee: Kim Hansen

3 September 2025	IF Lyseng (4)	0–4	ASA Fodbold (1)	Højbjerg
18:30 UTC+2		Report	Hauge 24', 68'; Spanner 65'; I.L. Eriksen 90'	Stadium: Lyseng Idrætspark; Referee: Michael Kjær

3 September 2025	Næstved HG (2)	1–3	OB (1)	Næstved
18:30 UTC+2	Grosso 15'	Report	Bech 65' (pen.), 84'; Rebeka Winther 68'	Stadium: MTM Service Park; Referee: Niclas Gomes

3 September 2025	Allerød Fodbold Klub (3)	1–3	BSF (3)	Allerød
19:00 UTC+2	Frederikke Andersen 55'	Report	Katja Larsen 63', 87'; Godvin 74'	Stadium: Allerød Idrætspark; Referee: Joachim Jørgensen

10 September 2025	Lemvig GF (4)	2–7	Randers Q (4)	Lemvig
17:30 UTC+2	Agger 37'; Dalsgård Mortensen 53'	Report	Duun 3', 37'; Mia Knudsen 24', 57'; Brixx 35', 78'; Søgaard Frederiksen 51'	Stadium: Lemvig Stadium; Referee: Maten Rashid

10 September 2025	Brødeskov IF (5)	0–3	Østerbro IF (1)	Hillerød
17:30 UTC+2		Report		Stadium: Brødeskov Stadion
Note: Brødeskov forfeited the match.

10 September 2025	Haderslev FK (4)	1–3	Dalum/Næsby (3)	Haderslev
19:00 UTC+2	Brink 25'	Report	Strand Jørgensen 49'; Ørskov Jensen 53'; ? 77'	Stadium: Haderslev Kunstgræsbane; Referee: Roy Pendegast

17 September 2025	Vejgaard Boldklub (4)	1–1 (a.e.t.) (5–4 p)	Aalborg Freja (2)	Aalborg
17:30 UTC+2	Anne Sofie Høst 3'	Report	Marie Pedersen 17'	Stadium: Spar Nord Arena; Referee: Michael Karstenskov
	Penalties
	Josefine Birgit Andersen (penalty scored); Anne Sofie Høst (penalty scored); Mathilde Jakobsen (penalty missed); Mathilde Beermann (penalty scored); Cille Bundgaard Holst (penalty scored); Mie Lindblad Kolding (penalty scored)		Kappers (penalty scored); Mitchell (penalty scored); Mathilde Eriksen (penalty scored); Cecilie Bro Stefansen (penalty scored); Meldgaard Bachmann (penalty missed); Stine Nørgaard (penalty missed)

23 September 2025	OKS (5)	0–17	HB Køge (1)	Odense
17:30 UTC+2		Report	Emilie Holt 4', 50'; Callesen 11'; Blinge Hansen 22', 47', 63'; Óskarsdottír 17', 19', 40'; Bagger 17', 28', 41'; Thygesen 43'; Alma Hansen 74', 77', 85', 88'	Stadium: OKSON-Park; Referee: Lucas Gejbøl

== Third round ==
A total of 16 teams will play in the third round. Three non-league teams from the fourth tier (BK Skjold, Vejgaard Boldklub, and Randers Q) remained in contention for the round of 16, for which the draw was made on 15 September 2025.

Number of teams per tier still in the competition
1		2	3	4	5	6	7	Tier
A-Liga champ.	A-Liga qual.	B-Liga	C-Liga	Women's Series	Women's Series Local	Series 1	Series 2	Total
5 / 6	4 / 6	2 / 5	2 / 10	3 / 13	0 / 13	0 / 4	0 / 1	16 / 58

30 September 2025	BK Skjold (4)	0–1	Østerbro IF (1)	Copenhagen
18:15 UTC+2		Report	Weatherall 15'	Stadium: Fælledparken; Referee: Marcus Pedersen

1 October 2025	Esbjerg fB (2)	0–6	AGF (1)	Esbjerg
19:00 UTC+2		Report	Littrup 4'; Aarhus 21'; Guldbæk 26'; Bjerring Nørgaard 48'; S.L. Jørgensen 74'; Krøger 88'	Stadium: Blue Water Arena; Referee: Frode Jakobsen

1 October 2025	Dalum/Næsby (3)	0–7	FC Midtjylland (1)	Odense
19:00 UTC+2		Report	Dybdahl 6', 44', 54'; Givskov 27'; Kaihøj 69'; Kjærgaard 72'; Mølholm Jørgensen 90'	Stadium: Odense Athletics Stadium; Referee: Hans-Henrik Høite Hansen

1 October 2025	Vejgaard Boldklub (4)	2–7	ASA Fodbold (1)	Aalborg
19:00 UTC+2	Høst 19'; Mathilde Jakobsen 52'	Report	Moss 30', 51', 75'; Fabricius 33'; Hauge 40', 45'; I.L. Eriksen 72'	Stadium: Lars Bloch Briller Arena; Referee: Michael Karstenskov

7 October 2025	Randers Q (4)	0–7	Kolding IF (1)	Randers
16:00 UTC+2		Report	B. Madsen 7'; S. Amby 25', 34', 77'; J.K. Christensen 56' (o.g.); Friis 83'; F. Ludvigsen 90'	Stadium: Romalt Stadium; Referee: Kasper Lind Villadsen

7 October 2025	BSF (3)	0–6	Brøndby IF (1)	Ballerup
19:00 UTC+2		Report	Jorde 3'; Christiansen 9', 20'; Rasmussen 40', 42'; Borbye 92'	Stadium: Ballerup Idrætspark; Referee: Zascha A. Sparving

5 November 2025	Copenhagen (2)	0–6	HB Køge (1)	Vanløse
18:30 UTC+2		Report	Lacho 25', 83', 85'; Oskarsdottír 54', 74', 80'	Stadium: Vanløse Idrætspark; Referee: Magnus Tækker Lærke

5 November 2025	Nordsjælland (1)	4–2 (a.e.t.)	OB (1)	Farum
19:00 UTC+2	Marfo 53'; Østersø 57'; Mott 105'; Højer 118'	Report	Pauli Jørgensen 45'; Krog 90' (pen.)	Stadium: Right to Dream Park; Referee: Frederikke Lydia Søkjær

== Quarter-finals ==
The draw for the quarter-finals was made on 6 November 2025.

Number of teams per tier still in the competition
1		2	3	4	5	6	7	Tier
A-Liga champ.	A-Liga qual.	B-Liga	C-Liga	Women's Series	Women's Series Local	Series 1	Series 2	Total
4 / 6	4 / 6	0 / 5	0 / 10	0 / 13	0 / 13	0 / 4	0 / 1	8 / 58

6 December 2025	Kolding IF (1)	3–1	FC Midtjylland (1)	Kolding
13:00 UTC+1	Wendicke 18'; Nabbumba 25' (o.g.); Lund 85'	Report	Givskov 54'	Stadium: Fynske Bank Arena; Referee: Julie Alsbro Thomsen

6 December 2025	Østerbro IF (1)	0–6	Nordsjælland (1)	Valby
14:00 UTC+1		Report	Engsig-Karup 6'; C. Larsen 12'; Marfo 26'; Linnebjerg 27'; Walter 32'; Moesgaard 45'	Stadium: Valby Idrætspark; Referee: Emilie Langthaler

6 December 2025	HB Køge (1)	2–0	AGF (1)	Køge
14:00 UTC+1	Jereko 16'; Nadim 69'	Report		Stadium: Capelli Sports Stadium; Referee: Zascha A. Sparving

7 December 2025	ASA Fodbold (1)	0–3	Brøndby IF (1)	Aarhus
14:00 UTC+1		Report	K. Karlsen 2'; Halldórsdóttir 16'; A. Nielsen 30'	Stadium: ASA Grounds; Referee: Philip Warburg

== Semi-finals ==
Number of teams per tier still in the competition
1		2	3	4	5	6	7	Tier
A-Liga champ.	A-Liga qual.	B-Liga	C-Liga	Women's Series	Women's Series Local	Series 1	Series 2	Total
3 / 6	1 / 6	0 / 5	0 / 10	0 / 13	0 / 13	0 / 4	0 / 1	4 / 58

Team 1	Agg.	Team 2	1st leg	2nd leg
HB Køge (1)	5–2	Brøndby IF (1)	1–1	1–4
Nordsjælland (1)	9–2	Kolding IF (1)	6–0	2–3

25 March 2026
17:00 UTC+2

HB Køge (1)	1–1	Brøndby IF (1)
Boye 11'	Report	Borbye 15'

Capelli Sports Stadium, Køge
Referee: Julie Alsbro Thomsen
2 April 2026
15:00 UTC+2

Brøndby IF (1)	1–4	HB Køge (1)
Buchberg 84'	Report	C. Paulson 2'; Gejl 20'; Schultz 47'; Thygesen 80'

1964 Park, Brøndby
Referee: Philip Warburg

HB Køge won 5–1 on aggregate.

25 March 2026
19:00 UTC+2

Nordsjælland (1)	6–0	Kolding IF (1)
Engsig-Karup 1'; El Behery 31', 48'; Walter 33'; J. Poulsen 58' (o.g.); Antvorskov 93'	Report

Right to Dream Park, Farum
Referee: Frida Klarlund
2 April 2026
13:00 UTC+2

Kolding IF (1)	2–3	Nordsjælland (1)
Ahrenholt 9'; J. Poulsen 18'	Report	Antvorskov 25', 43'; Højer 67'

Kolding Stadium, Kolding
Referee: Frederikke Søkjær

Nordsjælland won 9–2 on aggregate.

== Final ==
Number of teams per tier still in the competition
1		2	3	4	5	6	7	Tier
A-Liga champ.	A-Liga qual.	B-Liga	C-Liga	Women's Series	Women's Series Local	Series 1	Series 2	Total
2 / 6	0 / 6	0 / 5	0 / 10	0 / 13	0 / 13	0 / 4	0 / 1	2 / 58

16 May 2026
15:00 UTC+2

HB Køge	4–1	Nordsjælland
Schultz 3', 25'; Thygesen 77'; Wendicke 90+5'	Report	Højer 79' (pen.)

Capelli Sports Stadium, Køge
Attendance: 2,055
Referee: Nanna Løf Mørch Andersen

== Top goalscorers ==
#	Player	Club	Goals
1	(Denmark) Andrea Thierry	Kolding IF	7
2	(Iceland) Emelia Óskarsdóttir	HB Køge	6
3	(Denmark) Sissel Bøje	Sundby BK	5
3	(Denmark) Nanna Christiansen	Brøndby IF	5
3	(Denmark) Rikke Dybdahl	Midtjylland	5
3	(Denmark) Andrea Hauge	ASA Fodbold	5
3	(Denmark) Maria Hovmark	Copenhagen	5
3	(Denmark) Amalie Lund	Kolding IF	5
9	8 players		4

== Awards ==
=== Final MVP ===
Player	Club	Ref.
(United States) Macy Schultz	HB Køge	

== Sources ==
- "Pokalturnering (Kvinder): Resultater, Stilling & Kampprogram | Fodbold | DR". www.dr.dk (in Danish).
- Danish Women's Cup - Flashscore.dk

== See also ==
- 2025–26 A-Liga
- 2025–26 B-Liga
- 2025–26 C-Liga
