= 2025–26 A-Liga =

Danish women's football league season

A-Liga
- Season: 2025–26
- Dates: 9 August 2025 – 13 June 2026
- Champions: HB Køge; 4th title
- Champions League (QR): HB Køge; Brøndby
- Europa Cup (QR): Fortuna Hjørring
- Matches: 86
- Goals: 244 (2.84 per match)
- Best player: Mille Gejl
- Top goalscorer: Nadia Nadim (16 goals)
- Best goalkeeper: Jalen Thompkins (14 clean sheets)
- Biggest home win: AGF 6–0 OB Q (22 November 2025)
- Biggest away win: Kolding IF 0–5 Nordsjælland (23 September 2025); Kolding IF 1–6 Fortuna Hjørring (3 October 2025); OB Q 0–5 Fortuna Hjørring (15 November 2025)
- Highest scoring: Kolding IF 1–6 Fortuna Hjørring (3 October 2025); HB Køge 6–1 Kolding IF (1 November 2025)
- Longest winning run: 6 matches Brøndby
- Longest unbeaten run: 15 matches Brøndby
- Longest winless run: 10 matches AGF
- Longest losing run: 6 matches AGF; OB Q
- Highest attendance: 6,128; Brøndby 3–0 AGF (19 October 2025)
- Only matches in the regular season and the championship play-offs are covered in the statistics

The 2025–26 A-Liga was the 52nd season of the top-flight of the Danish Women's Football League.

From this season onwards the Danish Women's League (Danish: Kvindeliga) was renamed A-Liga.

The season saw an influx of current and former national team players return to the league after several years abroad, including Nadia Nadim, Sanne Troelsgaard, Simone Boye, Mille Gejl, and Rikke Madsen, with HB Køge signing all but Troelsgaard, who signed with FC Midtjylland. Troelsgaard was the first player to return to the domestic league, while Boye returned mid-season to join the club for its ultimately successful championship run. Longtime Brøndby profiles Nanna Christiansen and Julie Tavlo, who both served as captains throughout their tenures, retired from football following this season, with Tavlo departing mid-season at the start of March 2026.

== Format ==
The main round of the league is played in autumn as a double round-robin tournament between the 8 participating teams, where each team plays against each other both at home and away.

The six best placed teams qualify for spring championship play-offs. The finals consist once again of a double round-robin tournament among the six participating teams. The scores from the main league round carry over into the championship play-offs.

The two bottom ranked teams instead play in qualification play-offs, a double round-robin tournament with the top four teams of 2025–26 B-Liga for two spots in 2026–27 A-Liga. The scores from the main league round are not carried over into the qualification play-offs.

== Teams ==
There are 8 teams competing in the regular season of the league: the 6 teams from the previous season's championship play-offs, and the top two teams from the previous season's qualification play-offs. The two teams promoted from the qualification play-offs were Kolding IF, keeping their A-Liga spot, and FC Midtjylland, winning promotion from the B-Liga, the latter replacing relegated team B.93. This is FC Midtjylland's first ever season in the top tier since their founding in 2024, after only one season in B-Liga.

=== Changes ===
▲ from 2024–25 1st Division	▼ to 2025–26 B-Liga
FC Midtjylland	B.93

=== Stadiums and locations ===
Locations of the 2025–26 A-Liga teams.

Team	Location	Stadium	Capacity
AGF	Århus	Ceres Park Vejlby (Note: Due to renovations of Aarhus Stadium, the club play their home matches at Vejlby Stadium for the 2025–26 season)	11,500
Brøndby IF	Brøndby	1964 Park (Note: Some matches to be played at Brøndby Stadium)	2,000
Fortuna Hjørring	Hjørring	Nord Energi Arena	10,000
Kolding IF	Kolding	Kolding Stadium	10,000
HB Køge	Køge	Capelli Sports Stadium	4,000
FC Midtjylland	Herning	MCH Arena (Note: Some matches to be played at Vildbjerg Sports & Culture Center)	11,809
FC Nordsjælland	Farum	Right to Dream Park	10,300
OB Q	Odense	Nature Energy Park	15,790

=== Personnel and kits ===
Team	Manager	Captain	Kit	Sponsor	Sponsor
AGF	(Denmark) Søren Kiillerich	(Denmark) Sofie Vendelbo	(Sweden) Craft	(Denmark) Sparekassen Danmark	
Brøndby	(Norway) Bengt Sæternes	(Denmark) Kamilla Karlsen	(Denmark) Hummel	(Germany) Volkswagen	(Denmark) Faxe Kondi
Fortuna Hjørring	(Denmark) Lene Terp	(Romania) Florentina Olar	(United States) Nike, Inc.	(Denmark) Isafold A/S	
HB Køge	(Denmark) Kristian Mørch	(Denmark) Mille Gejl	(United States) Capelli Sport	(Denmark) Spar Nord	
Kolding	(Denmark) Lasse Skovhøj	(Denmark) Sofie Grøn	(Denmark) Hummel	(Denmark) Fynske Bank	
Midtjylland	(Denmark) Claus Struck	(Denmark) Katrine Thisgaard	(Germany) Puma	(Denmark) itm8	
Nordsjælland	(England) Chris Sargeant	(Denmark) Karen Linnebjerg	(United States) Nike, Inc.	(Germany) DHL	
OB	(Denmark) Kasper Mayland	(Denmark) Lærke Tingleff	(Denmark) Hummel	(Denmark) Albani Brewery	

=== Managerial changes ===
Team	Outgoing manager	Manner of departure	Date of vacancy	Position in the table	Incoming manager	Date of appointment
HB Køge	(Denmark) Kim Daugaard	Sacked	14 June 2025	Pre-season	(Denmark) Kristian Mørch	9 June 2025
AGF	(Denmark) Marie Lynge Olesen & Søren Holm	End of interim spell	2 July 2025	Pre-season	(Denmark) Claus Struck	2 July 2025
Midtjylland	(Denmark) Steen Gravgaard	Sacked	24 November 2025	7th	(Denmark) Claus Struck	1 February 2026
OB Q	(Denmark) Peer Lisdorf	Sacked	19 December 2025	8th	(Denmark) Kasper Mayland	3 January 2026
AGF	(Denmark) Claus Struck	Signed by Midtjylland	1 February 2026	4th	(Denmark) Søren Kiillerich	1 February 2026

== Regular season ==
=== League table ===
Pos	Team	Pld	W	D	L	GF	GA	GD	Pts	Qualification
1	HB Køge	14	10	2	2	33	15	+18	32	Championship play-offs
2	Fortuna Hjørring	14	8	5	1	28	8	+20	29	Championship play-offs
3	Brøndby	14	6	6	2	21	11	+10	24	Championship play-offs
4	AGF	14	7	3	4	22	16	+6	24	Championship play-offs
5	Nordsjælland	14	5	6	3	27	15	+12	21	Championship play-offs
6	Kolding	14	3	2	9	16	32	−16	11	Championship play-offs
7	Midtjylland	14	2	3	9	14	30	−16	9	Qualification play-offs
8	OB Q	14	1	1	12	6	40	−34	4	Qualification play-offs

Source: Danish Football Association (in Danish)
Rules for classification: 1) Points; 2) Goal difference; 3) Goals scored; 4) Away goals scored; 5) Play-off (played on neutral ground if determining teams for different rounds); 6) Draw.

=== Results ===
Home \ Away	AGF	BRØ	HJØ	KØG	KOL	MID	NOR	ODE
AGF		1–1	2–1	0–1	1–0	4–0	3–1	6–0
Brøndby	3–0		0–0	1–1	2–1	1–1	0–0	4–0
Fortuna Hjørring	4–0	2–0		2–1	1–1	1–1	0–0	2–0
HB Køge	2–0	3–2	0–1		6–1	3–2	2–2	3–1
Kolding	1–1	0–1	1–6	1–2		2–0	0–5	4–1
Midtjylland	2–3	2–3	0–1	0–2	2–0		2–2	0–3
Nordsjælland	0–1	0–0	2–2	2–3	3–1	5–1		3–0
OB Q	0–0	0–3	0–5	0–4	1–3	0–1	0–2	

Source: Danish Football Association (in Danish)
Legend: Blue = home team win; Yellow = draw; Red = away team win.

== Play-offs ==
=== Championship ===
==== League table ====
Pos	Team	Pld	W	D	L	GF	GA	GD	Pts	Qualification
1	HB Køge (C)	10	6	3	1	50	22	+28	53	Champions League second qualifying round
2	Brøndby	10	8	2	0	39	16	+23	50	Champions League second qualifying round
3	Fortuna Hjørring	10	4	0	6	37	21	+16	41	Europa Cup first qualifying round
4	Nordsjælland	10	4	4	2	47	26	+21	37	
5	AGF	10	0	2	8	26	34	−8	26	
6	Kolding	10	2	1	7	25	55	−30	18	

Source: Danish Football Association (in Danish)
Rules for classification: 1) Points; 2) Goal difference; 3) Goals scored; 4) Away goals scored; 5) Play-off (played on neutral ground if determining teams for different rounds); 6) Draw.
(C) Champions

==== Results ====
Home \ Away	AGF	BRØ	HJØ	KØG	KOL	NOR
AGF		0–1	1–2	0–3	1–2	0–0
Brøndby	3–0		2–0	0–0	3–2	1–0
Fortuna Hjørring	2–1	1–2		1–2	1–2	1–0
HB Køge	2–0	0–1	1–0		3–1	3–3
Kolding	0–0	0–3	0–1	0–2		1–5
Nordsjælland	2–1	2–2	2–0	1–1	4–1	

Source: Danish Football Association (in Danish)
Legend: Blue = home team win; Yellow = draw; Red = away team win.

=== Qualification ===
==== League table ====
Pos	Team	Pld	W	D	L	GF	GA	GD	Pts	Qualification
1	Midtjylland	10	6	2	2	30	8	+22	20	2026–27 A-Liga
2	Copenhagen (P)	10	6	2	2	19	9	+10	20	2026–27 A-Liga
3	ASA Fodbold (P)	10	5	3	2	20	12	+8	18	2026–27 A-Liga
4	OB Q	10	3	4	3	13	13	0	13	2026–27 A-Liga
5	Thy-Thisted	10	3	2	5	10	21	−11	11	2026–27 B-Liga
6	Østerbro (Note: The club has forfeited one or more matches.)	10	0	1	9	5	34	−29	1	2026–27 B-Liga

Source: Danish Football Association (in Danish)
Rules for classification: 1) Points; 2) Goal difference; 3) Goals scored; 4) Away goals scored; 5) Play-off (played on neutral ground if determining teams for different rounds); 6) Draw.
(P) Promoted

==== Results ====
Home \ Away	ASA	FCK	MID	ODE	THY	ØST
ASA Fodbold		2–3	0–2	2–2	2–1	4–1
Copenhagen	0–1		1–0	0–0	5–0	1–1
Midtjylland	1–1	3–0		2–2	4–1	9–0
OB Q	1–3	0–2	3–1		1–1	1–0
Thy-Thisted	0–0	1–4	0–5	1–0		3–0
Østerbro	1–5	1–3	0–3 (Note: Østerbro forfeited the match.)	1–3	0–2	

Source: Danish Football Association (in Danish)
Legend: Blue = home team win; Yellow = draw; Red = away team win.

== Season statistics ==
Only matches in the regular season and championship play-offs are covered in the statistics.

=== Top scorers ===
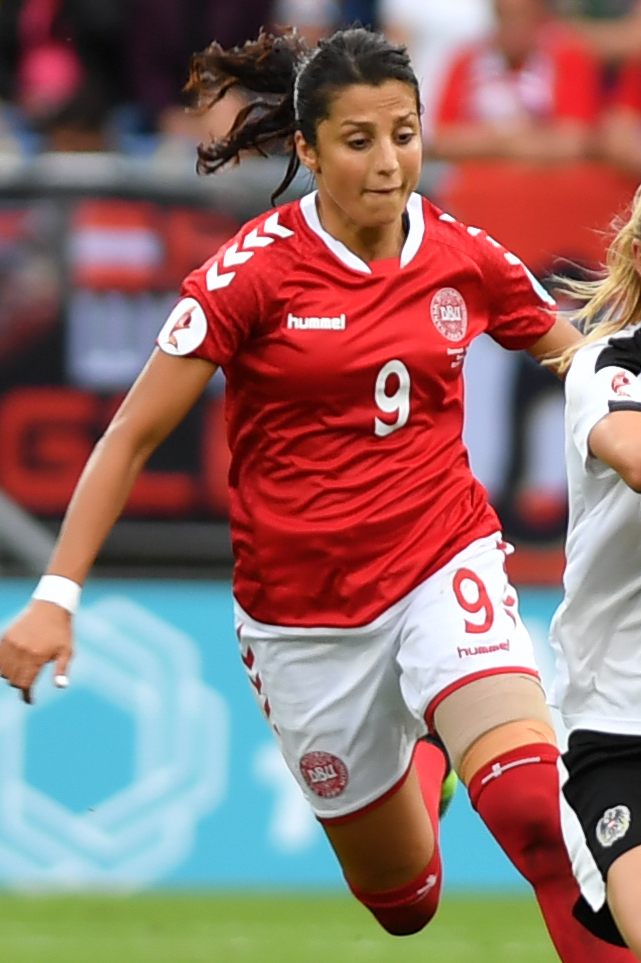
Nadia Nadim was the season's top scorer with 16 goals for HB Køge.

Rank	Player	Club	Goals
1	(Denmark) Nadia Nadim	HB Køge	16
2	(Nigeria) Joy Omewa (Note: Omewa departed the league mid-season.)	Fortuna	13
3	(Denmark) Mai Wendicke	Kolding/HB Køge (Note: Wendicke transferred to HB Køge mid-season.)	9
3	(Denmark) Flora Højer	Nordsjælland	9
5	(Denmark) Mille Gejl	HB Køge	8
6	(Iceland) Hafrún Rakel Halldórsdóttir	Brøndby	7
6	(Denmark) Anna Walter	Nordsjælland	7
8	(Denmark) Cecilie Winther Johansen	AGF	6
8	(Denmark) Rikke Madsen	HB Køge	6
10	(Sweden) Cassandra Korhonen	HB Køge	5
10	(Denmark) Cecilie Larsen	Nordsjælland	5

=== Hat-tricks ===
Player	For	Against	Result	Date
(Denmark) Rikke Madsen	HB Køge	OB Q	4–0 (A)	11 October 2025
(Denmark) Clara Littrup	AGF	Nordsjælland	3–1 (H)	1 November 2025
(Denmark) Signe Andersen	AGF	OB Q	6–0 (H)	22 November 2025

=== Clean sheets ===
Rank	Player	Club	Clean sheets
1	(United States) Jalen Tompkins	Brøndby	14
2	(Denmark) Marie Gade	AGF	7
2	(Romania) Andreea Părăluță	Fortuna Hjørring	7
4	(Canada) Molly Race	Nordsjælland	5
4	(Denmark) Alberte Vingum	HB Køge	5
6	(Finland) Ella Ervasti	Nordsjælland	3
6	(Denmark) Freja Thisgaard (Note: Thisgaard departed the league mid-season.)	Fortuna Hjørring	3
8	(Serbia) Ema Aleksić	HB Køge	2
8	(Denmark) Sofie Grøn	Kolding	2
8	(Denmark) Emilie Møller	HB Køge	2
8	(Denmark) Katrine Thisgaard	Midtjylland	2
8	(Denmark) Laura Worsøe	OB	2

=== Discipline ===
==== Player ====
- Most yellow cards: 6
  - (Denmark) Dajan Hashemi (Brøndby)
  - (Denmark) Karen Linnebjerg (Nordsjælland)
- Most red cards: 1
  - (Denmark) Meryem Baskaya (OB Q)
  - (Denmark) Dajan Hashemi (Brøndby)
  - (Denmark) Flora Højer (Nordsjælland)
  - (Denmark) Silke Lynge (AGF)
  - (Ghana) Princess Marfo (Nordsjælland)
  - (Denmark) Alberte Mott (Nordsjælland)
  - (Denmark) Freya Rossen (Midtjylland)
  - (Denmark) Julie Tavlo (Brøndby)

==== Club ====
- Most yellow cards: 34
  - Nordsjælland
- Fewest yellow cards: 7
  - OB Q
- Most red cards: 3
  - Nordsjælland
- Fewest red cards: 0
  - 3 clubs

== Awards ==
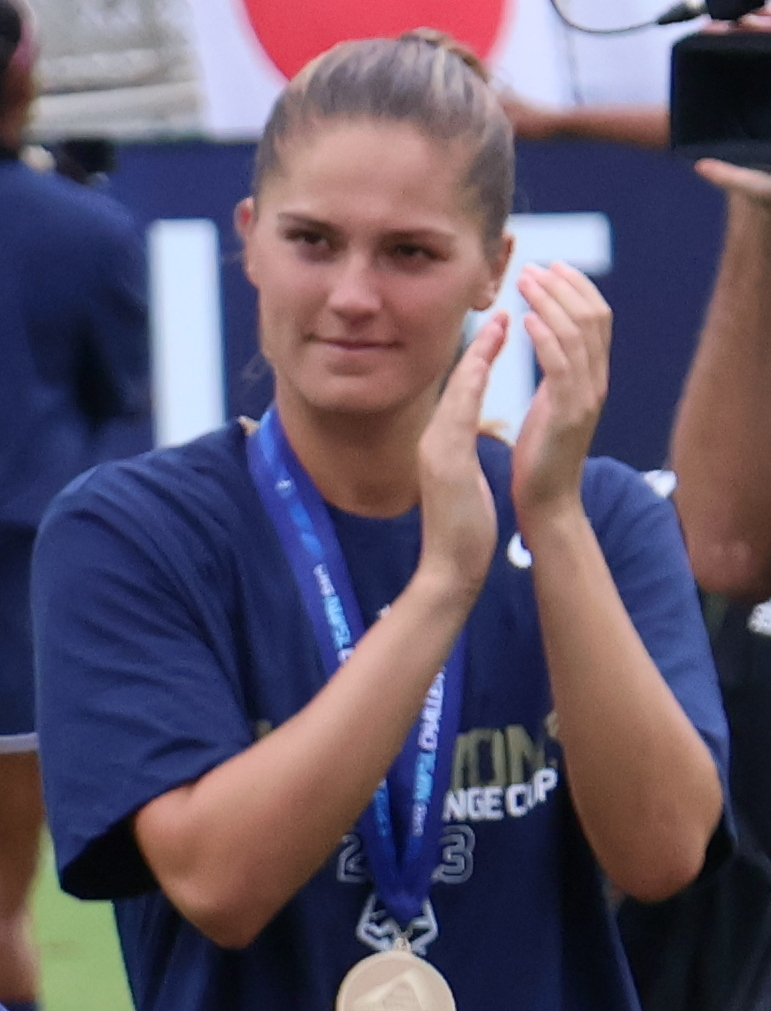
Mille Gejl was awarded Player of the Year, as well as winning Player of the Autumn and Player of the Month in April.

=== Player of the Year ===
Player	Club	Ref.
(Denmark) Mille Gejl	HB Køge	

=== Player of the Autumn ===
Player	Club	Ref.
(Denmark) Mille Gejl	HB Køge	

=== Player of the Month ===
Month	Player	Club	Ref.
August	(Denmark) Mai Wendicke	Kolding IF	
September	(Denmark) Mathilde Rasmussen	Brøndby	
October	(Denmark) Laura Frank	Fortuna Hjørring	
November	(Denmark) Nadia Nadim	HB Køge	
March	(Denmark) Josefine Funch	Nordsjælland	
April	(Denmark) Mille Gejl	HB Køge	

== Sources ==
- "Kvindeligaen: Resultater, Stilling & Kampprogram | Fodbold | DR". www.dr.dk (in Danish).
- "Statistik - Se alle tal for Kvindeligaen - TV 2 - TV 2". sport.tv2.dk (in Danish).

== See also ==
- 2025–26 B-Liga
- 2025–26 C-Liga
- 2025–26 Danish Women's Cup
- 2025–26 Champions League
- 2025–26 Europa Cup
