= Mila Bischoff =

Danish footballer (born 2009)

Personal information
- Full name: Mila Busk Mutahi Bischoff
- Date of birth: 1 July 2009 (age 17)
- Place of birth: Copenhagen, Denmark
- Height: 1.82 m (6 ft 0 in)
- Positions: Midfielder; forward

Team information
- Current team: Brøndby IF
- Number: 37

Youth career
- Sundby
- –2024: Nordsjælland

Senior career*
Years	Team	Apps	(Gls)
2024–	Brøndby	55	(14)

International career^{‡}
2024–2025	Denmark U16	8	(3)
2025–2026	Denmark U17	11	(4)
2026	Denmark U19	1	(1)
- * Club domestic league appearances and goals as of 3 October 2026 ‡ National team caps and goals as of 17:02, 7 September 2026 (UTC)

Mila Busk Mutahi Bischoff (born 1 July 2009) is a Danish footballer who plays as a midfielder and forward for A-Liga club Brøndby IF.

== Career ==
Bischoff played youth football with Sundby and FC Nordsjælland before signing with Brøndby IF in 2024 at the age of 15, on a two-year contract. On 11 September the same year she made her debut for the senior team in a 7–0 Danish Cup win against Ølstykke, where she scored two goals. In 2025 Bischoff was invited to spend a week at La Masia training with Barcelona B for the second time. On 1 January 2026 she extended her contract with Brøndby.

== National team ==
In November 2026 she was called up to the Danish national team for the first time.

== Personal life ==
Mila Bischoff is the granddaughter of former Danish national team player Søren Busk, her father is former Brøndby and Manchester City player Mikkel Bischoff and her cousin is former Brøndby player and current NEC Nijmegen player Clement Bischoff.

== Titles ==
- A-Liga
  - Silver: 2025–26
