= Martyna Brodzik =

Polish footballer (born 2001)

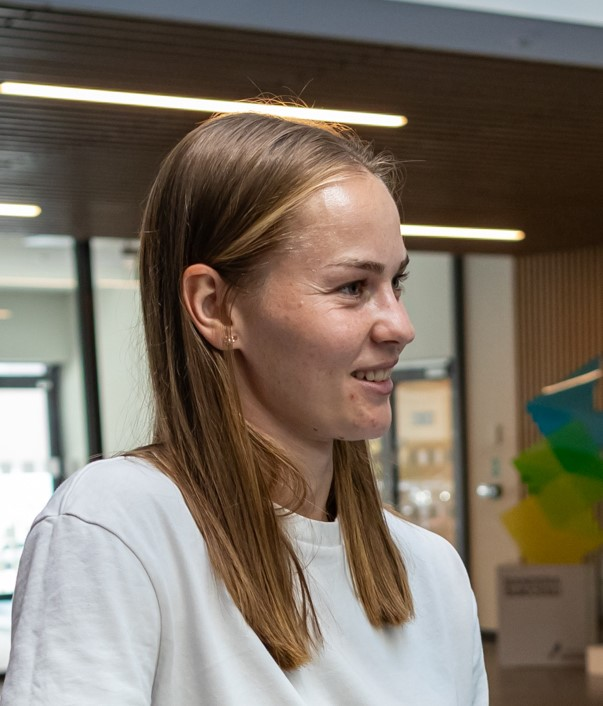
- Brodzik in 2024

Personal information
- Date of birth: 7 July 2001 (age 25)
- Position: Midfielder

Team information
- Current team: Brøndby
- Number: 13

Youth career
- –2016: Olimpia Szczecin

Senior career*
| Years | Team | Apps | (Gls) |
| 2016–2022 | Olimpia Szczecin | | |
| 2022–2025 | Pogoń Szczecin | 54 | (6) |
| 2025– | Brøndby | 0 | (0) |

International career^{‡}
| 2024– | Poland | 8 | (0) |
- * Club domestic league appearances and goals as of 19:52, 2 June 2026 (UTC) ‡ National team caps and goals as of 23:32, 4 July 2025 (UTC)

Martyna Brodzik (born 7 July 2001) is a Polish professional footballer who plays as a midfielder for Kvindeliga club Brøndby IF and the Poland national team. She previously played for Ekstraliga club Pogoń Szczecin.

== Club career ==
In 2024, Brodzik won the Polish championship with Pogoń Szczecin.

In May 2025, Brodzik signed with Danish side Brøndby.

== International career ==
Brodzik was selected to for Poland squad for the UEFA Women's Euro 2025 but had to withdraw due to injury.

== Career statistics ==
=== International ===
As of match played 3 June 2025

Appearances and goals by national team and year
| National team | Year | Apps | Goals |
|---|---|---|---|
| Poland | 2024 | 5 | 0 |
| Poland | 2025 | 3 | 0 |
| Total | | 8 | 0 |

== Honours ==
Pogoń Szczecin

- Ekstraliga: 2023–24
