= Lilli Halttunen =

Finnish footballer (born 2005)

Personal information
- Date of birth: 1 July 2005 (age 21)
- Place of birth: Finland
- Position: Forward

Team information
- Current team: Brøndby IF
- Number: 33

Youth career
- Espoo
- HJK

Senior career*
| Years | Team | Apps | (Gls) |
| 2022–2024 | HJK | 43 | (16) |
| 2022 | → PKKU (loan) | 2 | (0) |
| 2025–2026 | Linköping | 29 | (4) |
| 2026– | Brøndby IF | 6 | (1) |

International career^{‡}
| 2021–2022 | Finland U17 | 9 | (1) |
| 2022–2024 | Finland U19 | 18 | (4) |
| 2024 | Finland U23 | 2 | (0) |
| 2024– | Finland | 1 | (1) |
- * Club domestic league appearances and goals as of 25 May 2025 ‡ National team caps and goals as of 3 December 2024

Lilli Halttunen (born 1 July 2005) is a Finnish professional footballer who plays as a forward for A-Liga club Brøndby IF.

== International career ==
After representing Finland at youth international levels, Halttunen made her full international debut on 29 October 2024, in a UEFA Women's Euro 2025 qualifying play-offs match against Montenegro, scoring a goal in her fist appearance in a 5–0 home win.

== Career statistics ==
As of 3 December 2024

Appearances and goals by national team and year
| National team | Year | Apps | Goals |
|---|---|---|---|
| Finland | 2024 | 1 | 1 |
| Total | | 1 | 1 |

Scores and results list Finland's goal tally first, score column indicates score after each Halttunen goal.

List of international goals scored by Lilli Halttunen
| No. | Date | Venue | Opponent | Score | Result | Competition |
|---|---|---|---|---|---|---|
| 1. | 29 Oct 2024 | Tammelan Stadion, Tampere, Finland | Montenegro | 5–0 | 5–0 | UEFA Women's Euro 2025 qualifying play-offs |

== Honours ==
HJK

- Kansallinen Liiga: 2024
- Finnish Women's Cup: 2024
