= Malin Brenn =

Norwegian footballer (born 1999)

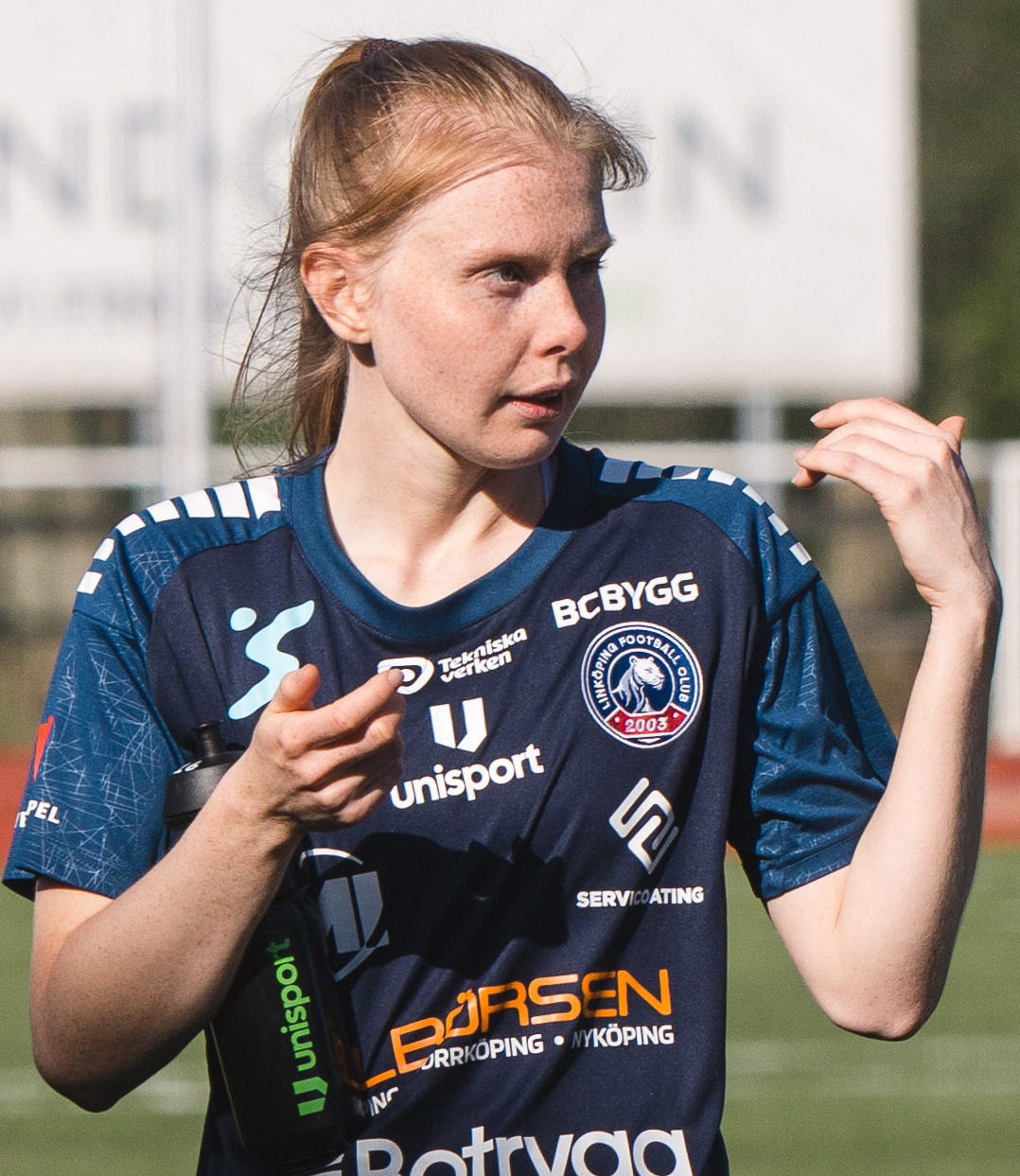
- Brenn with Linköping in 2025

Personal information
- Full name: Malin Johnsen Brenn
- Date of birth: March 13, 1999 (age 27)
- Place of birth: Jessheim, Norway
- Position: Defender

Team information
- Current team: Brøndby IF
- Number: 18

Youth career
- –2013: Ullensaker/Kisa
- 2014–2016: LSK

Senior career*
| Years | Team | Apps | (Gls) |
| 2016–2022 | LSK | 80 | (2) |
| 2022–2023 | Como | 18 | (0) |
| 2023–2025 | Linköping | 5 | (0) |

International career
| 2014 | Norway U15 | 4 | (0) |
| 2015 | Norway U16 | 12 | (0) |
| 2016 | Norway U17 | 7 | (0) |
| 2016–2018 | Norway U19 | 19 | (0) |
| 2021–2022 | Norway U23 | 7 | (0) |
| 2023– | Norway | 1 | (0) |
- * Club domestic league appearances and goals

Malin Johnsen Brenn (born March 13, 1999) is a Norwegian footballer from Jessheim who plays for Brøndby IF and the Norway national team.

== Club career ==
Brenn played age-specific football for Ullensaker/Kisa before going to LSK Kvinner in 2014. She debuted in the Toppserien in April 2016 in the home game against Røa. The following year, she established herself as a regular in the starting eleven at LSK. In June 2018, she tore her cruciate ligament in a U19 international match, thus she was out of action for almost a year. Also in the 2020 season, she was out for a period due to a knee injury.

In June 2022, it became known that Malin Brenn, together with Camilla Linberg, had finished in LSK Kvinner. Romerikes Blad claimed that there was complete discord within the club and that the players left the club after a persistent conflict that had escalated recently.

In August 2022, it was announced that she had signed for Italian club Como in Serie A.

== International career ==
Brenn has international matches for U15, U16, U17, U19, U23, and the senior national team for Norway. She made her debut for the senior team against Uruguay on 15 February 2023.

== Merits ==
=== With LSK ===
- Toppserien : 2016, 2017, 2018, 2019
- Norwegian Cup: 2016, 2018, 2019
