= Sofie Hornemann =

Danish footballer

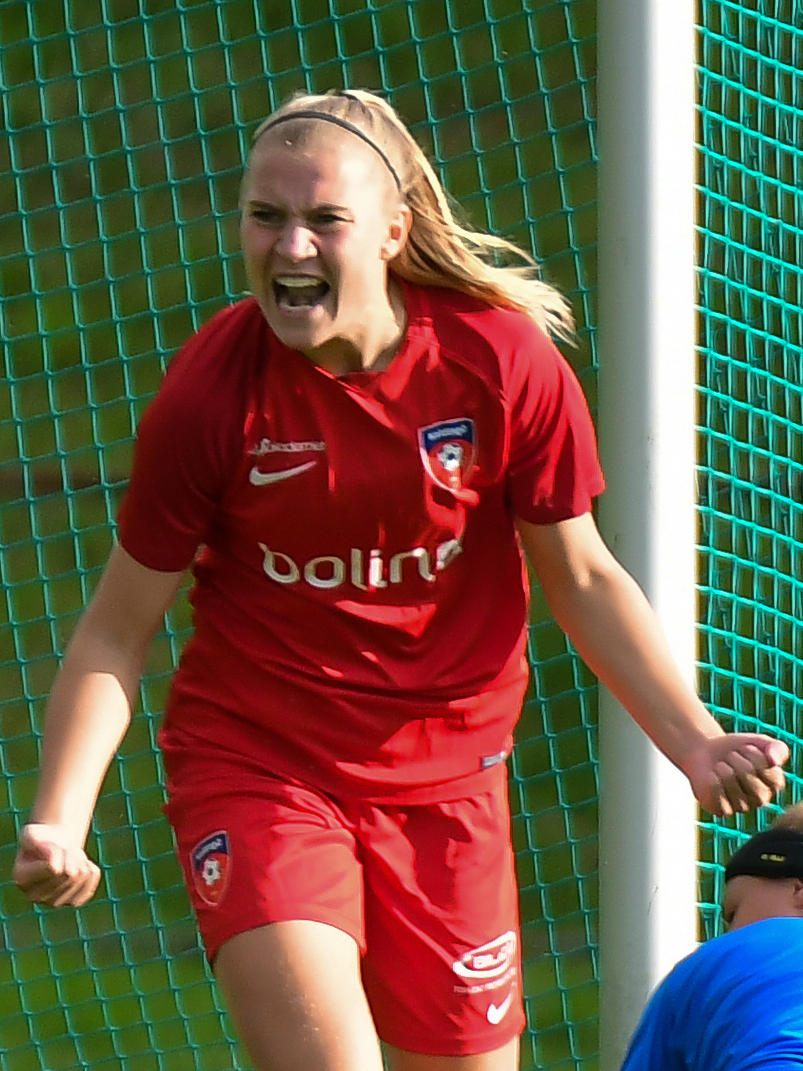
- Hornemann in 2019

Personal information
- Full name: Sofie Thrane Hornemann
- Date of birth: 1 April 2002 (age 24)
- Place of birth: Aalborg, Denmark
- Height: 1.79 m (5 ft 10 in)
- Position: Striker

Team information
- Current team: Saint-Étienne
- Number: 11

Senior career*
Years	Team	Apps	(Gls)
2019–2021	KoldingQ	42	(7)
2021	HB Køge	12	(2)
2022–2023	KoldingQ	29	(10)
2023–2025	Brøndby	45	(10)
2025–	Saint-Étienne	3	(0)

International career^{‡}
2017–2018	Denmark U16	9	(5)
2018–2019	Denmark U17	9	(1)
2019–2020	Denmark U19	5	(0)
2023	Denmark U23	6	(1)
- * Club domestic league appearances and goals as of 2 October 2025 ‡ National team caps and goals as of 15 August 2025

Sofie Hornemann (born 1 April 2002) is a Danish football player who plays as a striker for Saint-Étienne.

== Club career ==
Hornemann turned out for KoldingQ from 2019 to 2021, before a brief spell with HB Køge in autumn 2021. She returned to KoldingQ for another season and a half, before joining Brøndby in 2023 on a two-year contract.

== International career ==
She participated at the 2019 UEFA Women's Under-17 Championship in Bulgaria.

Hornemann made her debut for the Denmark junior national team on 28 August 2019 against the England in Staffordshire.

== Career statistics ==
=== Club ===
As of 11 September 2021.

Club	Season	League			UWCL		Total	
Club	Season	Division	Apps	Goals	Apps	Goals	Apps	Goals
KoldingQ	2019-20	Elitedivisionen	19	3	0	0	19	3
KoldingQ	2020-21	Elitedivisionen	23	4	0	0	23	4
HB Køge	2021-22	Elitedivisionen	5	2	2	0	7	2
Total			47	13	2	0	49	13
