= Tilde Lindwall =

Swedish footballer (born 2001)

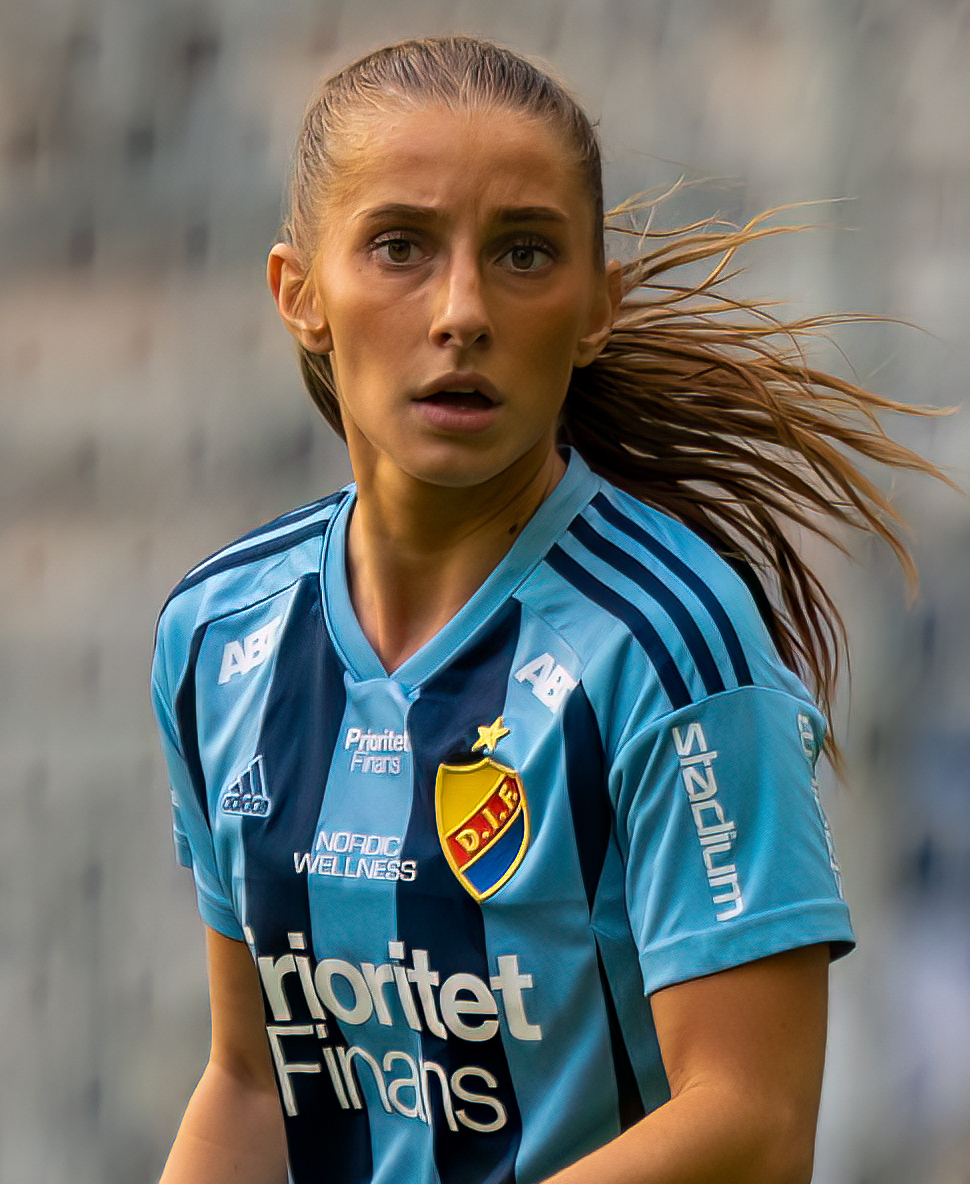
- Lindwall with Djurgårdens IF in 2022

Personal information
- Date of birth: 24 August 2001 (age 25)
- Place of birth: Sweden
- Height: 1.61 m (5 ft 3 in)
- Position: Midfielder

Team information
- Current team: Brøndby
- Number: 22

Youth career
- Djurgårdens IF

Senior career*
Years	Team	Apps	(Gls)
2017–2023	Djurgårdens IF	113	(17)
2024–2026	Vålerenga	25	(5)
2026–	Brøndby	9	(2)

International career^{‡}
2017–2018	Sweden U17	14	(2)
2018–2019	Sweden U19	10	(0)
2023–	Sweden U23	2	(0)
- * Club domestic league appearances and goals as of 24 June 2026 ‡ National team caps and goals as of 4 December 2023

Tilde Lindwall (born 24 August 2001) is a Swedish professional footballer who plays as an attacking midfielder for Danish club Brøndby.

== Club career ==
=== Djurgårdens IF ===
Lindwall started playing football at Djurgårdens IF at the age of 6. She made her Damallsvenskan debut as a substitute against Kopparbergs/Göteborg FC on 5 November 2017. In 2020, she was ranked the sixth greatest talent in Damallsvenskan by Swedish newspaper Aftonbladet.

=== Vålerenga (2024–) ===
In February 2024 she signed a two-year deal with Norwegian champions Vålerenga. She made her league debut against Stabæk on 18 March 2024.

== International career ==
Lindwall has international matches for U17, U19, and the U23 national team for Sweden.
