= Kamilla Karlsen =

Danish footballer (born 2000)

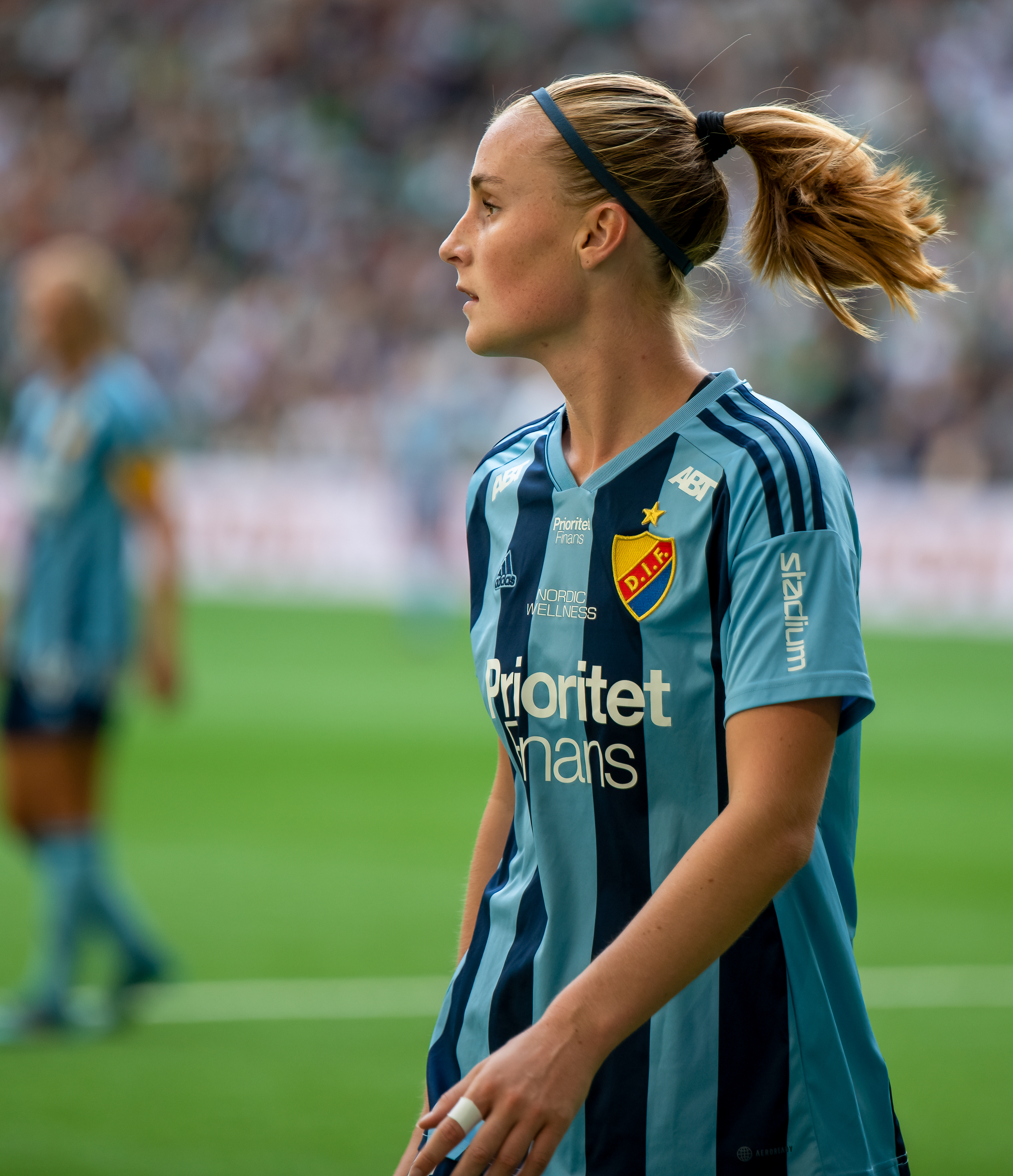
- Karlsen with Djurgården in 2022

Personal information
- Full name: Kamilla Lilhammer Karlsen
- Date of birth: 7 May 2000 (age 26)
- Place of birth: Allerød, Denmark
- Height: 1.73 m (5 ft 8 in)
- Position: Defensive midfielder

Team information
- Current team: Brøndby IF
- Number: 12

Youth career
- 2013–: Allerød FK
- –2015: Hillerød GI Damefodbold

Senior career*
| Years | Team | Apps | (Gls) |
| 2016–2017 | BSF | | |
| 2017–2020 | Brøndby IF | 89 | (3) |
| 2021 | FC Fleury 91 | 5 | (0) |
| 2021–2023 | Djurgården | 60 | (0) |
| 2024– | Brøndby IF | 56 | (1) |

International career^{‡}
| 2015 | Denmark U16 | 8 | (0) |
| 2015–2017 | Denmark U17 | 15 | (1) |
| 2017–2019 | Denmark U19 | 27 | (0) |
| 2018–2023 | Denmark U23 | 6 | (0) |
- * Club domestic league appearances and goals as of 16:11, 27 July 2026 (UTC) ‡ National team caps and goals as of 16:11, 27 July 2026 (UTC)

Kamilla Lilhammer Karlsen (born 7 May 2000) is a Danish footballer who plays as a defensive midfielder for A-Liga club Brøndby and has appeared for the Denmark women's national under-23 team. She has been team captain since 2026.

Karlsen was selected for an exclusive sports talent grade at 13 years old, facilitating training within the school programme. She continued playing youth football with Hillerød before playing senior football in the top tier with club BSF. At 17 years old Karlsen was recruited by Brøndby.

== Career ==
She has also played for the Danish youth national teams, several times. She has received praise for her leadership qualities and is often captain.

She has previously played for Ballerup-Skovlunde Fodbold, from 2016 to 2017. In 2017, she signed for Brøndby IF.

== Honours ==
=== Club ===
Brøndby IF

- A-Liga
  - Winner: 2019
  - Runners-up: 2018, 2026
- Danish Cup
  - Winner: 2018
  - Runners-up: 2019
