= Agnete Nielsen =

Danish footballer (born 1999)

Personal information
- Full name: Agnete Kristine Nielsen
- Date of birth: 15 April 1999 (age 27)
- Place of birth: Hørve, Denmark
- Height: 1.74 m (5 ft 9 in)
- Position: Striker

Youth career
- 2016–2017: BSF

Senior career*
Years	Team	Apps	(Gls)
2017–2020	Fortuna Hjørring	37	(12)
2020–2021	Brøndby IF	24	(13)
2021–2023	Vålerenga	25	(5)
2023–2026	Brøndby	50	(9)

International career^{‡}
2015	Denmark U16	6	(0)
2016	Denmark U17	5	(3)
2016–2018	Denmark U19	18	(7)
2019–	Denmark U23	1	(0)
- * Club domestic league appearances and goals as of 07:47, 24 July 2026 (UTC) ‡ National team caps and goals as of 07:47, 24 July 2026 (UTC)

Agnete Nielsen (born 15 April 1999) is a Danish professional football player who is a free agent. She plays as a striker, most recently with A-Liga club Brøndby, and has appeared for the Denmark under-23 national team.

== Career ==
Nielsen scored on her debut for Fortuna Hjørring, where she won the Danish Championship twice in 2018 and 2020. She later transferred to Brøndby, where she played regularly for the first team.

She has played for several of Denmark's youth national teams and is part of Denmark's U/23 national team.

== Honours ==
=== Club ===
Fortuna Hjørring

Champion

- A-Liga: 2017-18, 2019–20
- Danish Cup: 2019
