= Julie Jorde =

Norwegian association football player

Personal information
- Full name: Julie Aune Jorde
- Date of birth: 16 April 2004 (age 22)
- Place of birth: Oslo, Norway
- Height: 1.64 m (5 ft 5 in)
- Position: Midfielder

Team information
- Current team: Parma
- Number: 6

Senior career*
Years	Team	Apps	(Gls)
2020–2023	Lyn Fotball	72	(3)
2024–2025	Bayer Leverkusen	11	(1)
2025	→ Brøndby IF (loan)	10	(0)
2025–2026	Brøndby IF	20	(2)
2026–	Parma	0	(0)

International career^{‡}
2019	Norway U-15	3	(0)
2021–2023	Norway U-19	27	(2)
2023	Norway U-23	8	(0)
- * Club domestic league appearances and goals as of 13 July 2026 ‡ National team caps and goals as of 7 April 2025

Julie Aune Jorde (born 16 April 2004) is a Norwegian professional footballer who plays as a midfielder for Serie A club Parma and the national team.

== Club career ==
Jorde started her professional career at 16, signing for the Norwegian Toppserien club Lyn Fotball. After three years playing for Lyn, she moved to in January 2024 on a free transfer. Following a loan spell at Brøndby IF, Jorde made a permanent transfer to the Danish A-Liga club in July 2025. Jorde previously played for Bayer 04 Leverkusen.

On 27 July 2026, Jorde joined Italian Serie A club Parma on a two-year deal until 2028.

== International career ==
Jorde has represented Norway at youth level.Jorde has made 38 collated appearances for the Norway youth teams, ranging U-15 to U-23, since 2019.
