= Simone Boye =

Danish footballer (born 1992)

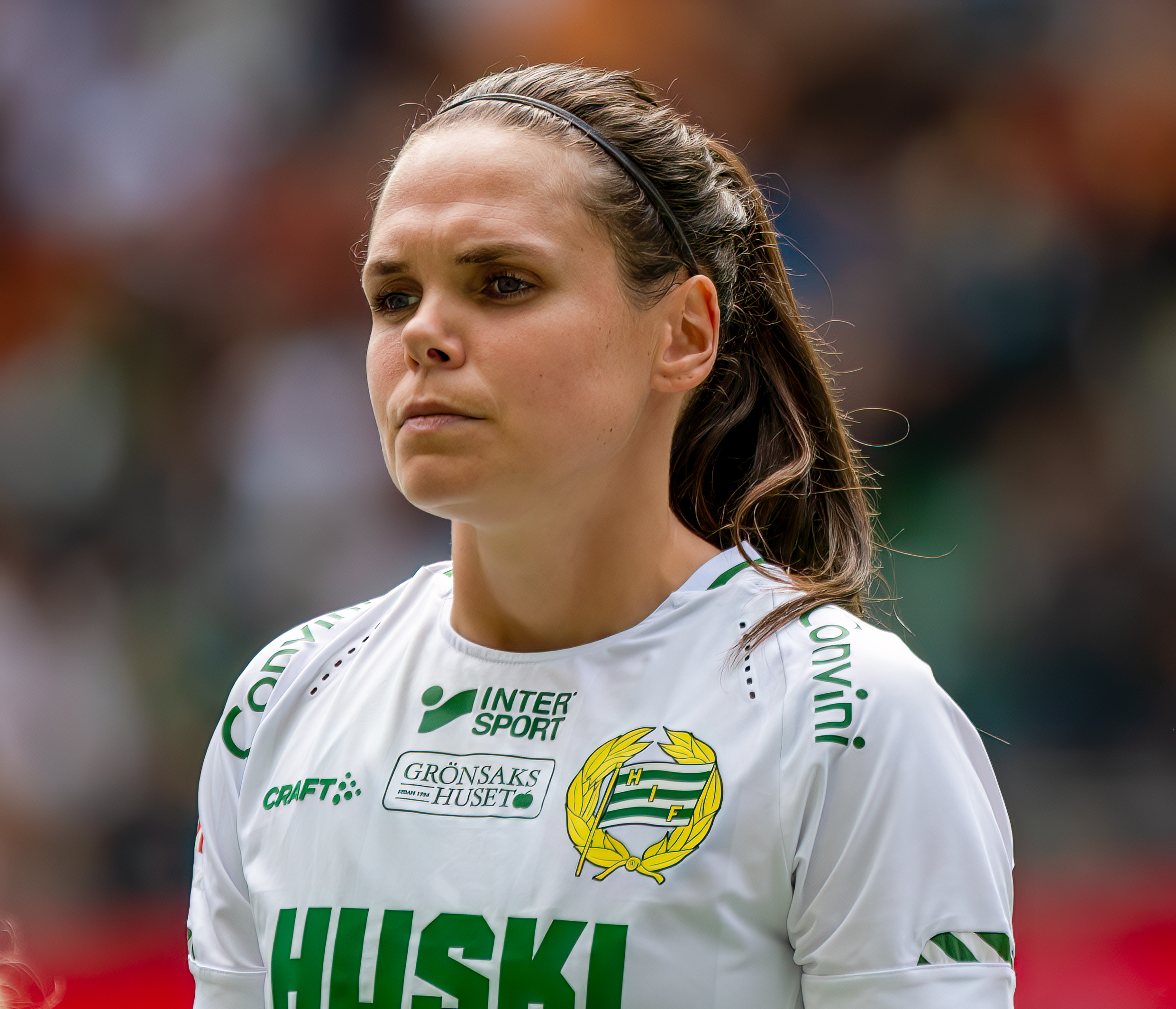
- Boye playing for Hammarby in 2022

Personal information
- Full name: Simone Boye Sørensen
- Date of birth: 3 March 1992 (age 34)
- Place of birth: Regstrup, Denmark
- Height: 5 ft 8 in (1.73 m)
- Position: Defender

Team information
- Current team: Hammarby IF
- Number: 5

Youth career
- 1998–2007: Jernløse IF
- 2007: MV05

College career
Years	Team	Apps	(Gls)
2012	UTSA Roadrunners	17	(3)

Senior career*
Years	Team	Apps	(Gls)
2007–2013	BSF		
2013–2017	Brøndby IF	75	(9)
2017–2018	FC Rosengård	23	(1)
2019–2021	Bayern Munich	22	(2)
2021–2022	Arsenal	5	(0)
2022–2025	Hammarby IF	39	(4)
2025–	HB Køge	19	(2)

International career^{‡}
2007–2008	Denmark U17	17	(3)
2009–2011	Denmark U19	18	(2)
2011	Denmark U23	1	(0)
2011–	Denmark	100	(5)
Medal record
Women's football
Representing Denmark
UEFA Women's Championship
Silver medal – second place	2017 Netherlands	Team
- * Club domestic league appearances and goals as of 06 September 2026 ‡ National team caps and goals as of 12 October 2026

Simone Boye Sørensen (born 3 March 1992) is a Danish professional footballer who plays as a defender for HB Køge and the Denmark national team.

== Club career ==
=== Denmark and USA ===
Raised in Regstrup, near Holbæk, Boye began playing football with Jernløse IF at age six. In 2007, she decided to move to M/V- 05 by Holbæk. Noted for her performance, Boye was called by the Ballerup-Skovlunde, BSF, sports club where she had the opportunity to play in the A-Liga, the top level of the national championship.

In 2012, Boye attended the University of Texas at San Antonio, where she played college soccer for the UTSA Roadrunners. Boye later returned to her Danish club BSF after the American season.

Boye signed for Brøndby IF in the Danish A-Liga in 2013 and was deployed as a central midfielder at club level. Equally comfortable defending or attacking, she represented Brøndby in the UEFA Women's Champions League. She was voted 2014 Danish Football Player of the Year. She was later appointed captain of Brøndby.

=== FC Rosengård ===
On 20 June 2017, she signed for FC Rosengård in the Swedish Damallsvenskan. Before making her debut for the club, Boye sustained a knee injury that kept her sidelined for the majority of the year.

In 2018, Boye returned to the pitch and played 21 league games, helping Rosengård to finish 3rd in the Damallsvenskan table. The club won the 2017–18 Svenska Cupen. Boye appeared in the final, that ended in a 1–0 win at home against Linköping FC.

=== Bayern Munich ===
On 7 January 2019, Boye transferred to Bayern Munich, signing a three-and-a-half-year contract. Boye won the 2020–21 Frauen-Bundesliga with the club. The same season, Bayern Munich reached the semi-final of the 2020–21 UEFA Women's Champions League, losing 5–3 on aggregate to Chelsea, despite a first-leg win in Munich in which Boye came on as a substitute.

=== Arsenal ===
On 22 July 2021, it was announced that Boye had signed for English side Arsenal. She rejoined her former coach from FC Rosengård at the club, Jonas Eidevall. Her playing time was limited throughout her first season, only making five appearances in the Women's Super League.

=== Hammarby IF ===
On 14 July 2022, Boye joined Hammarby IF, signing a three-and-a-half-year deal.

On 6 June 2023, Hammarby won the 2022–23 Svenska Cupen. Boye appeared in the final, that ended in a 3–0 win at home against BK Häcken. The club also won the 2023 Damallsvenskan, claiming its second Swedish championship after 38 years, with Boye making 22 league appearances. At the end of the season, she was nominated for the prize of Damallsvenskan Defender of the Year, that eventually was awarded to Josefine Rybrink from BK Häcken. In November she announced that she will leave Hammarby after three-and-a-half years.

=== HB Køge ===
In January, she returned to Denmark and signed with HB Køge.

== International career ==
Boye made her debut for the senior Denmark national team in December 2011, a 4–0 win over Chile at the São Paulo International Tournament. She entered play as a substitute for Mariann Gajhede Knudsen on 83 minutes.

An injury sustained at the 2013 Algarve Cup kept Boye out of contention for a place in Denmark's squad for UEFA Euro 2013. In November 2014, it was reported that national coach Nils Nielsen was building his team around Boye, who had shown some of the same defensive qualities as Denmark's male captain Daniel Agger.

In 2017, Boye was named to Denmark's UEFA Euro 2017 squad. She decided the penalty shootout in the semi-final against Austria and sent Denmark into their first ever European Championship final.

In June 2022, she was selected for the final squad at the UEFA Euro 2022 in England.

== Personal life ==
She has a weakness in her eardrums which causes them to perforate easily. In February 2024, she announced her pregnancy with her first child, that is expected to arrive in the beginning of the summer, and that she takes a break till autumn.

== Career statistics ==
Scores and results list Denmark's goal tally first, score column indicates score after each Boye goal.

List of international goals scored by Simone Boye Sørensen
No.	Date	Venue	Opponent	Score	Result	Competition
1	10 March 2014	Albufeira, Portugal	United States	3–0	5–3	2014 Algarve Cup
2	13 September 2014	Vejle, Denmark	Malta	5–0	8–0	2015 World Cup qualifier
3	15 January 2015	Belek, Turkey	New Zealand	1–0	2–3	Friendly
4	28 November 2016	Turbize, Belgium	Belgium	1–0	3–1	Friendly
5	12 June 2018	Viborg, Denmark	Hungary	3–1	5–1	2019 World Cup qualification

== Honours ==
Brøndby IF

- A-Liga: 2014–15, 2016–17; runner-up 2013–14, 2015–16
- Danish Women's Cup: 2013–14, 2014–15, 2016–17; runner-up 2015–16

FC Rosengård

- Damallsvenskan: runner-up 2017
- Svenska Cupen: 2017–18

Bayern Munich

- Bundesliga: 2020–21

Hammarby IF

- Svenska Cupen: 2022–23
- Damallsvenskan: 2023

HB Køge

- Danish Women's Cup: 2026
- A-Liga: 2025–26

Individual

- Danish Football Player of the Year: 2014
- Inducted into the Ballerup-Skovlunde Football Hall of Fame
- Danish Cup player of the year: 2015
