= Julie Tavlo Petersson =

Danish footballer (born 1989)

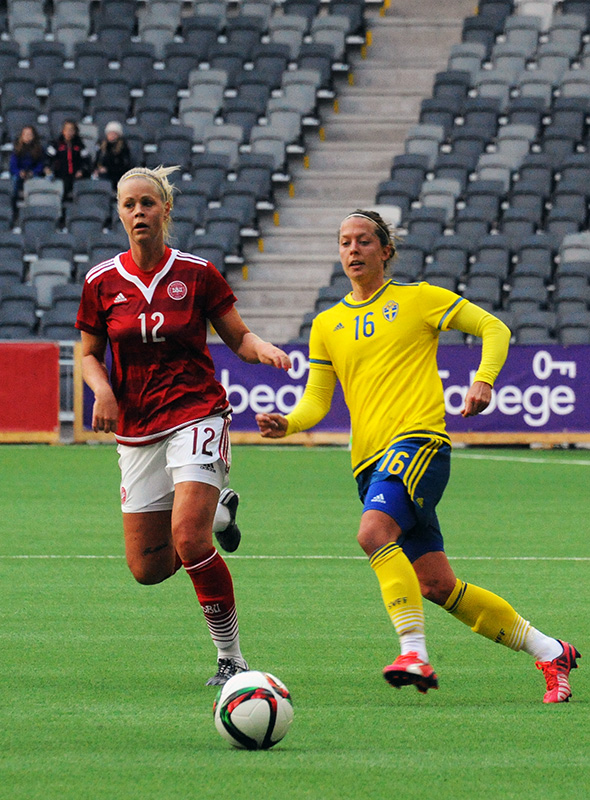
- Tavlo Petersson (12) playing for Denmark in 2015

Personal information
- Full name: Julie Tavlo Petersson
- Date of birth: 20 October 1989 (age 37)
- Place of birth: Høje Taastrup, Denmark
- Height: 1.77 m (5 ft 10 in)
- Position: Midfielder

Youth career
- 1997–1999: HIK
- 1999–2003: B70
- 2003–2006: Skovlunde
- 2006–2009: TFC
- 2009–2010: Damsø

Senior career*
Years	Team	Apps	(Gls)
2010–2014	Taastrup		
2014–2020	Brøndby	49	(8)
2020–2021	Logroño	28	(2)
2021–2025	Brøndby	8	(0)

International career^{‡}
2012–2019	Denmark	17	(1)
- * Club domestic league appearances and goals as of 1:40, 21 August 2019 (UTC) ‡ National team caps and goals as of 11:04, 2 September 2020 (CEST)

Julie Tavlo Petersson (born 20 October 1989) is a Danish former footballer who played as a midfielder. Tavlo spent 10 years, the majority of her senior playing career, with Danish A-Liga club Brøndby. From 2012 to 2019 Tavlo appeared with the Denmark national team. Tavlo also worked as an analyst covering the 2025 Euros.

== Club career ==
In January 2014, Tavlo Petersson left Taastrup FC to sign for Brøndby IF. Tavlo Petersson's buttocks went viral in November 2014, when teammate Theresa Nielsen posted photographs to Instagram of Brøndby's dressing room celebrating a 3–2 win over rivals Fortuna Hjørring.

== International career ==
In December 2012 Tavlo Petersson made her senior international debut as a second-half substitute for Sofie Junge Pedersen in Denmark's 5–0 win over Mexico in São Paulo, Brazil. She was not selected in national coach Kenneth Heiner-Møller's Denmark squad for UEFA Women's Euro 2013.

== Personal life ==
Tavlo Petersson combined her football career with studies at University College Sealand and work as a teaching assistant.
