= Hafrún Rakel Halldórsdóttir =

Icelandic footballer

Personal information
- Date of birth: 1 October 2002 (age 24)
- Place of birth: Iceland
- Position: Midfielder

Team information
- Current team: Brøndby IF
- Number: 14

Youth career
- Afturelding

Senior career*
Years	Team	Apps	(Gls)
2017–2018	Afturelding/Fram	25	(3)
2019	Afturelding	17	(5)
2020–2023	Breiðablik	57	(9)
2024–	Brøndby IF	7	(2)

International career^{‡}
2018	Iceland U-16	7	(2)
2018–2019	Iceland U-17	8	(1)
2019-2020	Iceland U-19	9	(0)
2023	Iceland U-23	2	(0)
2021–	Iceland	20	(1)
- * Club domestic league appearances and goals as of 21 August 2024 ‡ National team caps and goals as of 15 October 2026

Hafrún Rakel Halldórsdóttir (born 1 October 2002) is an Icelandic footballer who plays as a midfielder for Brøndby IF and the Iceland national team.

== Club career ==
After coming up through the junior teams of Afturelding, Hafrún Rakel started her senior team career with the joint team of Afturelding/Fram in the 2. deild kvenna. After being pursued by several clubs, she joined Úrvalsdeild kvenna club Breiðablik in end of September 2019 after her contract expired with Afturelding expired.

At the end of the 2023 season she joined Danish club Brøndby IF.

== International career ==
Hafrún Rakel was selected to the Icelandic national team for the first time in March 2021. She made her debut against Italy on 10 April the same year.

On 13 June 2025, Hafrún Rakel was called up to the Iceland squad for the UEFA Women's Euro 2025.

== International goals ==
No.	Date	Venue	Opponent	Score	Result	Competition
1.	18 July 2023	Stadion Wiener Neustadt, Wiener Neustadt, Austria	Austria	1–0	1–0	Friendly
