= Nanna Christiansen =

Danish footballer (born 1989)

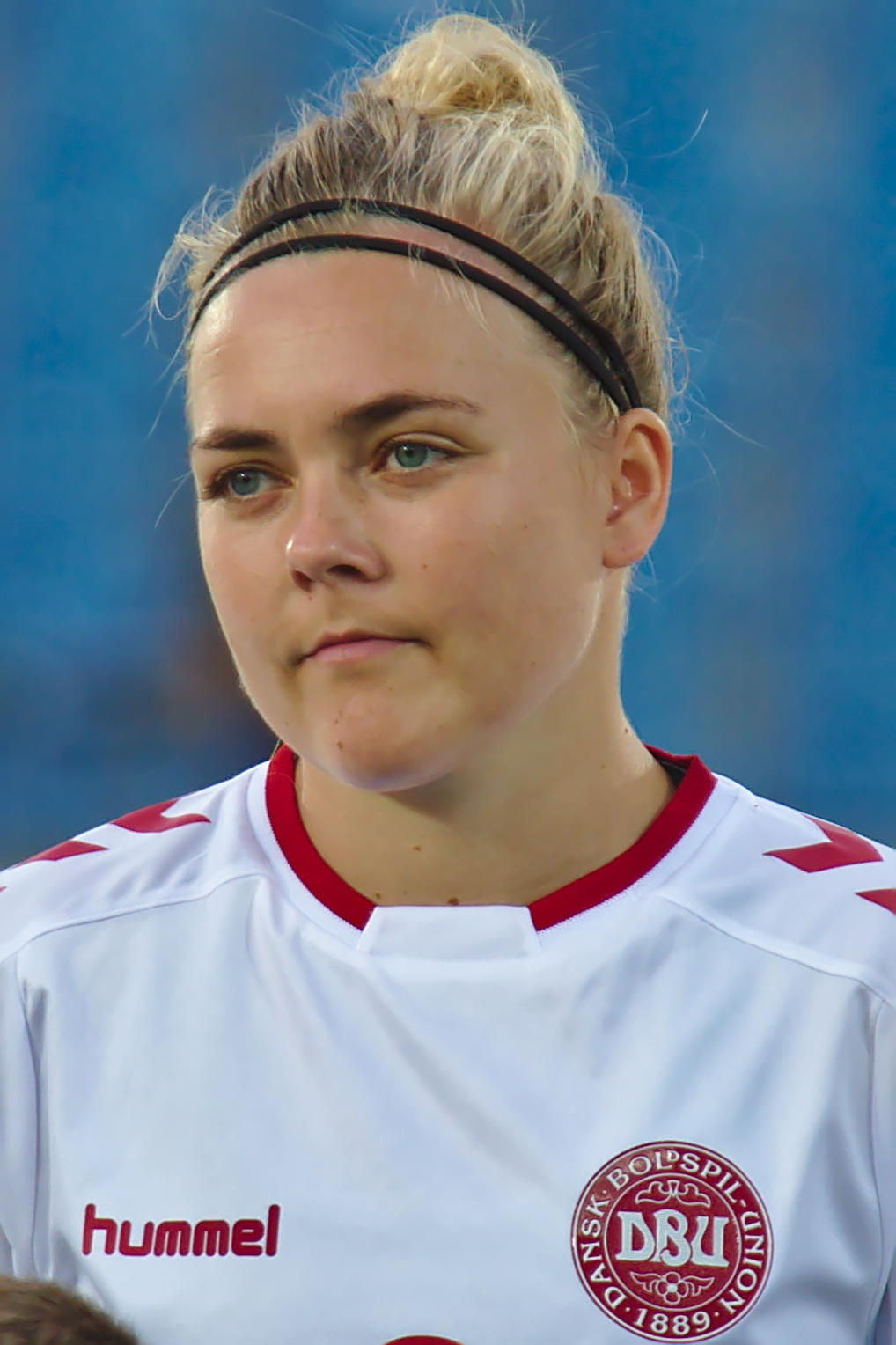
- Christiansen 2017

Personal information
- Full name: Nanna Christiansen
- Date of birth: 17 June 1989 (age 37)
- Place of birth: Denmark
- Height: 1.67 m (5 ft 6 in)
- Position: Midfielder

Youth career
- 1997–2007: Skjold

Senior career*
Years	Team	Apps	(Gls)
2007–2026	Brøndby	520	(270)

International career
2005	Denmark U17	8	(5)
2005–2008	Denmark U19	36	(22)
2009	Denmark U23	2	(0)
2009–2021	Denmark	112	(12)
Medal record
Women's football
Representing Denmark
UEFA Women's Championship
Silver medal – second place	2017 Netherlands	Team
- * Club domestic league appearances and goals

Nanna Christiansen (born 17 June 1989) is a Danish former professional footballer who played as a midfielder for A-Liga club Brøndby, which she also represented in the Champions League. She was named the Danish Young Footballer of the Year in 2006.

== Club career ==
Christiansen spent almost two decades with Brøndby winning the league and the Danish Cup seven times each, and recording 520 appearances and 270 goals, before retiring from football in June 2026. Upon her retirement, former long-term Brøndby player and manager Per Nielsen noted Christiansen as the most important player in the history of the club.

== International career ==
Christiansen was a member of the senior Danish national team from 2009 to 2021. She made her international debut for Denmark in the 2009 Algarve Cup against United States on 4 March 2009. Christiansen was called up for the 2009 Euros, and took part in the subsequent Euros, which in 2013 saw Denmark reach the semi-finals. This was followed up by the national team's biggest success in the modern era reaching the final and winning silver in 2017. On 8 October 2019, she made her 100th international appearance against Georgia.

As a junior international Christiansen took part in the 2006 and 2007 U19 European Championships.

== Personal life ==
Christiansen has been diagnosed with diabetes but states it has not affected her football. In 2013, she was working as an assistant in a nursery school.
