= Mille Gejl =

Danish footballer (born 1999)

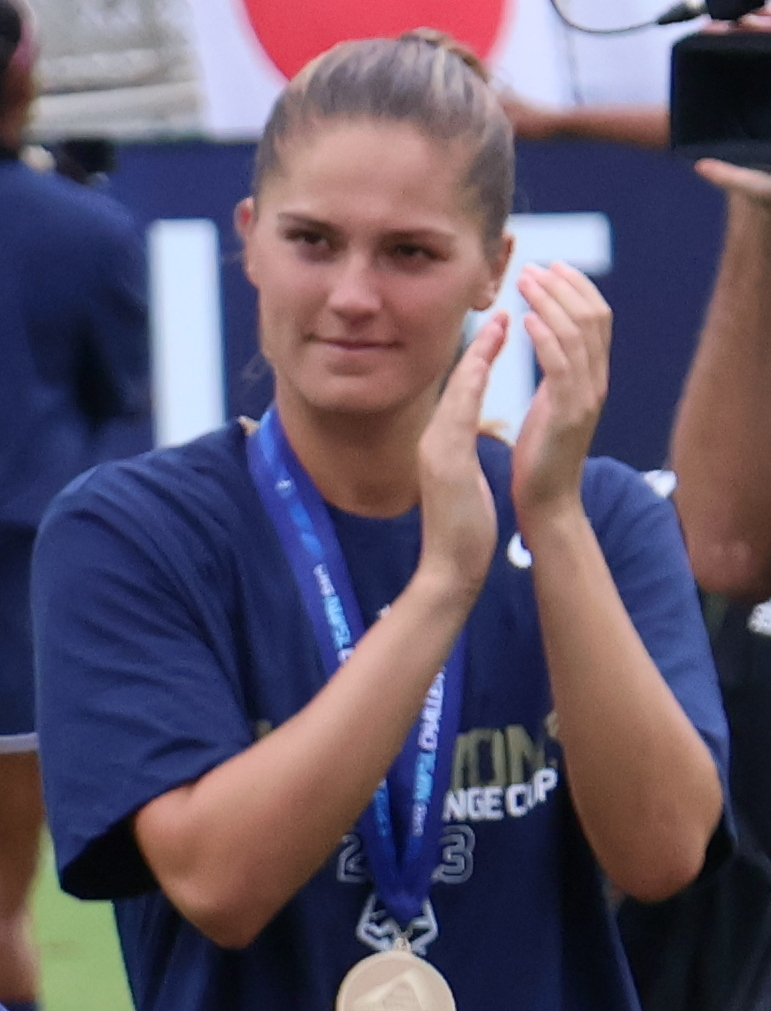
- Gejl with North Carolina Courage in 2023

Personal information
- Full name: Mille Gejl Jensen
- Date of birth: 23 September 1999 (age 27)
- Place of birth: Denmark
- Height: 1.75 m (5 ft 9 in)
- Position: Midfielder

Team information
- Current team: HB Køge
- Number: 23

Senior career*
Years	Team	Apps	(Gls)
2017–2018	KoldingQ	19	(9)
2018–2021	Brøndby IF	62	(27)
2021–2023	BK Häcken	49	(15)
2023–2024	North Carolina Courage	18	(3)
2024	→ Montpellier (loan)	7	(0)
2024–2025	Crystal Palace	21	(5)
2025–	HB Køge	3	(3)

International career^{‡}
2014	Denmark U16	6	(0)
2014–2016	Denmark U17	15	(6)
2016–2018	Denmark U19	22	(6)
2018	Denmark U23	1	(0)
2019–	Denmark	38	(7)
- * Club domestic league appearances and goals as of 27 August 2025 ‡ National team caps and goals as of 28 October 2025

Mille Gejl Jensen (Danish: [ˈmilə ˈkɑjl ˈjensn̩]; born 23 September 1999) is a Danish professional footballer who plays as a midfielder for Danish A-Liga club HB Køge and the Denmark national team.

== Club career ==
Gejl started her football career in Varde IF. In 2015, she switched to the bigger league club KoldingQ, with whom she also reached the final of DBU's National Cup tournament in 2018. In August of the same year, she moved to the top club Brøndby IF. With the club, she helped win the Elite division 2018-19 and the cup final again twice. The following year she extended until the summer of 2020. She made her official debut in the 2018–19 UEFA Champions League with Brøndby, where she also scored 2–2 against the Italian giants Juventus in the round of 16. In the 2020–21 UEFA Champions League Gejl was among the selected penalty takers in the round of 16 final against Vålerenga, which was won by Brøndby.

She then switched in June 2021 to Swedish BK Häcken in the Damallsvenskan. Here she was also a regular part of the team's line-up in the group stage at the 2021–22 UEFA Champions League.

In January 2023, Gejl signed a two-year deal with the North Carolina Courage. She scored her first goal for the Courage on 25 March 2023 in a 1–0 win over the Kansas City Current.

Gejl was loaned to Montpellier HSC on 31 January 2024. After the 2023–24 Division 1 Féminine season, she was not signed by Montpellier and was released by the Courage on 3 July.

Gejl played for Crystal Palace in the English Women's Super League from August 2024 to June 2025, recording 5 goals in 21 appearances.

== International career ==
Gejl appeared several times on several of the youth national teams. She scored several times for the U17 national teams in the qualifiers for the U17 European Championship. She was also selected for the 2018 U19 European Championship in Switzerland, where Denmark historically reached the semi-finals.

On 21 January 2019, she made her official debut for the senior Danish national team in a friendly match against Finland in Larnaca, Cyprus. In this match, she scored her first national team goal.

She appeared several times in the qualification for the European Championship in England 2022, the World Cup qualification and the Algarve Cup in Portugal. In the European Championship qualifier against Georgia on 8 October 2019, Mille Gejl scored Denmark's first goal, but later had to leave with an injury. In June 2022, she was selected for the first time for the final squad at the European Football Championship 2022 in England.

Ahead of the European Championship finals in England, Gejl scored the 2–1 goal, four minutes into extra time in the historic record match against Brazil. Gejl had a chorus dedicated to her, in the official EC song for the national team, with the stanza: "You need to Gejl out".

== International goals ==
No.	Date	Venue	Opponent	Score	Result	Competition
1.	21 January 2019	GSZ Stadium, Larnaca, Cyprus	Finland	1–0	1–0	Friendly
2.	29 August 2019	Viborg Stadium, Viborg, Denmark	Malta	6–0	8–0	UEFA Women's Euro 2022 qualifying
3.	8 October 2019	Mikheil Meskhi Stadium-2, Tbilisi, Georgia	Georgia	1–0	2–0	UEFA Women's Euro 2022 qualifying
4.	21 September 2021	ASK Arena, Baku, Azerbaijan	Azerbaijan	7–0	8–0	2023 FIFA Women's World Cup qualification
5.	21 October 2021	Viborg Stadium, Viborg, Denmark	Bosnia and Herzegovina	6–0	8–0	2023 FIFA Women's World Cup qualification
6.	30 November 2021	Viborg Stadium, Viborg, Denmark	Russia	3–0	3–1	2023 FIFA Women's World Cup qualification
7.	24 June 2022	Parken Stadium, Copenhagen, Denmark	Brazil	2–1	2–1	Friendly

== Achievements ==
- Damallsvenskan:
  - Silver: 2021
- The Elite Division:
  - Gold: 2019
  - Silver: 2020
- Kvindepokalen:
  - Winner: 2026
  - Finalist: 2019, 2021
