= Køge Stadium =

Sports venue in Køge, Denmark

Coordinates: 55°28′4″N 12°10′31″E

Køge Stadium Capelli Sport Stadion
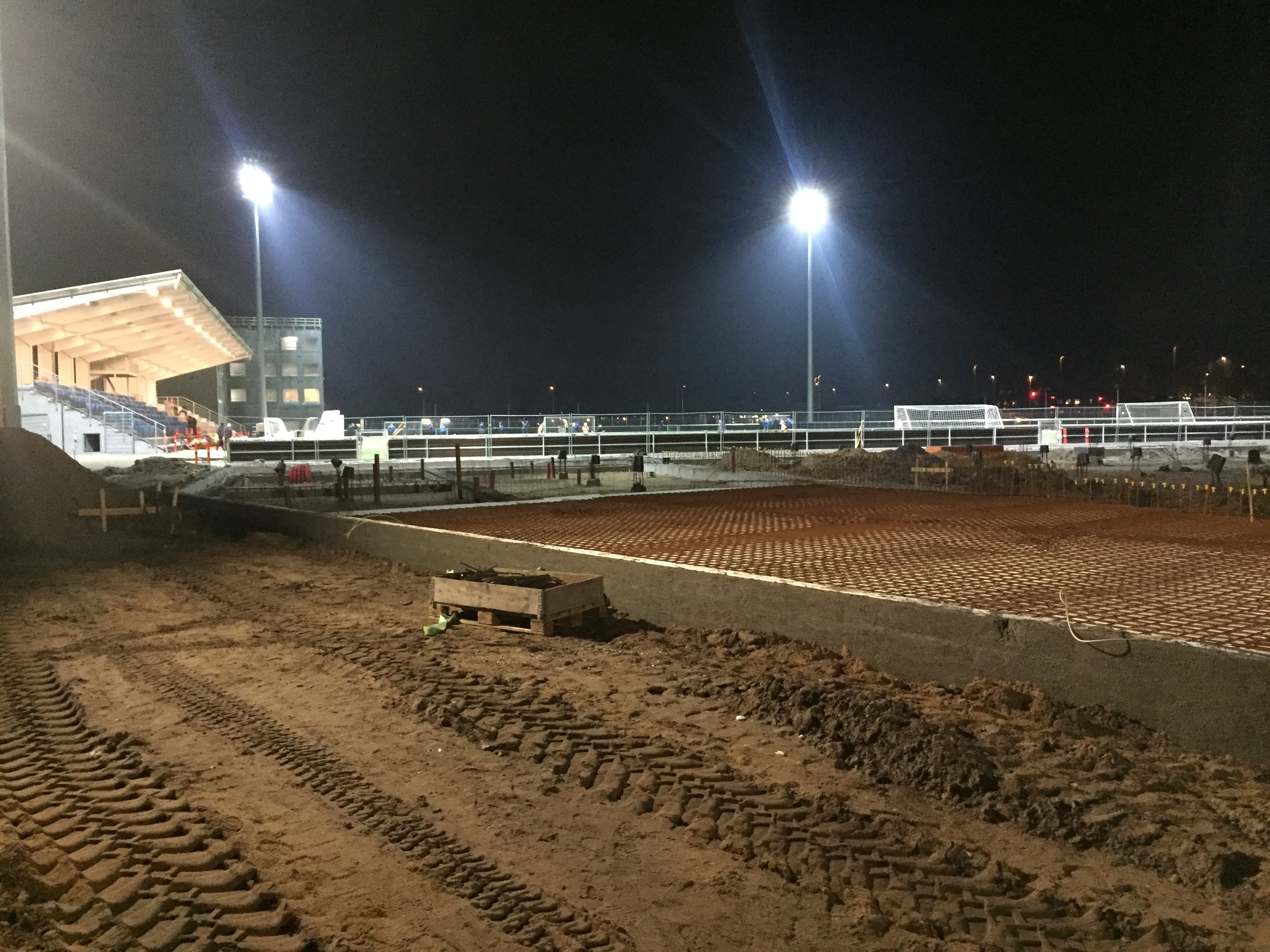
- Køge Stadium undergoing renovations in January 2019
- Interactive map of Køge Stadium; Capelli Sport Stadion
- Location: Køge, Denmark
- Owner: Køge Municipality
- Capacity: 6,000
- Surface: Artificial turf
- Field size: 102 x 66 m

Construction
- Opened: 27 June 1932; 94 years ago
- Renovated: 2019

Tenants
- Køge Boldklub; HB Køge

Køge Stadion is a multi-purpose sports venue located in Køge, Denmark. It serves as the home ground of Danish 1st Division club HB Køge, as well as Danish A-Liga club HB Køge Women, the city's women's team. The stadium has a capacity of 6,000 spectators.

The stadium used to hold 10,000 people and opened in 1932.
