= 2026–27 Danish Women's Cup =

Tournament details
- Country: Denmark
- Dates: 9 August 2026 – May 2026
- Teams: 57

Tournament statistics
- Matches played: 43
- Goals scored: 231 (5.37 per match)
- Top goal scorer: Camille Rexbye (12 goals)
- All statistics correct as of 07:43, 21 October 2026 (UTC).

The 2026–27 Danish Women's Cup is the 34th edition of the Danish Women's Cup.

In the first round four matches were decided by one side forfeiting the match due to inability to establish a team selection. On 19 and 21 August, respectively, the forfeiting teams were sanctioned with fines ranging from DKK 500–1,500. The second round featured two derbies - one between Odense clubs OB Q and OKS, and one between Østerbro sides Østerbro IF and Skjold, both of which ended with the highest-seeded team victorious.

== Teams ==
A total of 57 teams entered the 2026–27 Women's Cup. Six preliminary rounds took place in the non-league tiers (4–7) of the Danish football league system, overseen by the six respective regional departments of the Danish Football Association (DBU), culminating in 29 participating teams. 22 are from the A-Liga, B-Liga, and C-Liga play-offs of the previous season. For the second round, the six teams from the previous season's A-Liga championship play-offs join the competition to face the 26 winners of the first round.

JAI Fodbold dissolved and withdrew from the 2025–26 C-Liga before the play-offs, leaving C-Liga with 11 teams instead of 12. While the 2025–26 Cup added a team from Series 2 (tier 7), this year one team – B73 Slagelse – sat out the first round by draw and was sent directly through to the second round.

Phase	Entering	Advancing	Matches	Begins
First round (51 teams)	29 clubs from the non-league tiers (4–6); 10 clubs from the C-Liga play-offs; 6 clubs from B-Liga play-offs; 6 clubs from A-Liga play-offs	—N/a	26	9 August 2026
Second round (32 teams)	6 clubs from the A-Liga championship play-offs	26 winners from the first round	16	8 September 2026
Third round (16 teams)	—N/a	16 winners from the second round	8	TBA
Quarter-finals (8 teams)	—N/a	8 winners from the third round	4	TBA
Semi-finals (4 teams)	—N/a	4 winners from the quarter-finals	2	TBA
Final (2 teams)	—N/a	2 winners from the semi-finals	1	TBA

== First round ==
A total of 51 teams play in the first round: 22 teams from the previous season's qualification play-offs in the top three tiers; 10 from C-Liga (tier 3), 6 from B-Liga (tier 2) and 6 from A-Liga (tier 1); as well as 29 non-league teams that qualified for the tournament in the non-league qualifications taking place in the spring; 8 from Series 1 (tier 6), 9 from the Denmark Series Local (tier 5), and 12 from the Denmark Series (tier 4).

Number of teams per tier still in the competition
1		2	3	4	5	6	Tier
A-Liga champ. (Note: The A-Liga championship play-off teams from the previous season join in the second round.)	A-Liga qual.	B-Liga qual.	C-Liga qual.	Denmark Series	Denmark Series Local	Series 1	Total
6 / 6	6 / 6	6 / 6	10 / 10	12 / 12	9 / 9	8 / 8	57 / 57

9 August 2026 1	Viking/RIK (5)	0–10	Sundby (2)	Rønne
14:00 UTC+2		Report	Sissel Bøje 8' (pen.), 17', 20', 27', 41', 76', 77'; Camilla Hansen 14'; Maria Jacobsen 22', 81'	Stadium: Rønne Stadium North; Referee: Sebastian Bærnthsen

11 August 2026 2	Vejgaard Boldklub (4)	0–3	Midtjylland (1)	Aalborg
18:00 UTC+2		Report		Stadium: Spar Nord Arena
Note: The home side, Vejgaard B, forfeited the match.

11 August 2026 3	Fix (5)	0–3	Vallensbæk IF (5)	Brønshøj
18:00 UTC+2		Report	Makoben-Blessing 8', 45'; Hannah Fog 67'	Stadium: Pilesvinget; Referee: Jonas Bülow-Olsen

11 August 2026 4	Brønderslev IF (4)	1–2	Viborg FF (2)	Brønderslev
19:00 UTC+2	Camilla Hansen 37'	Report	Cecilie Agerholm 34'; Cecilie Mossing 63'	Stadium: Arena Kop & Kande; Referee: Kasper Torp

12 August 2026 5	Aarhus 1900 (4)	3–0	Lemvig GF (5)	Aarhus
18:00 UTC+2		Report		Stadium: Fort Langenæs
Note: The away side, Lemvig GF, forfeited the match.

12 August 2026 6	Aalborg Freja (3)	1–4	ASA (1)	Aalborg
18:00 UTC+2	Emma Johansen 4'	Report	Feddersen 6'; Stær 26'; Ida Eriksen 48'; Ulrikke Linde 69'	Stadium: Gardian Park; Referee: Thomas Lang

12 August 2026 7	Østvendsyssel (6)	0–3	Brabrand IF (3)	Dronninglund
18:00 UTC+2		Report	Freja Vinther 54'; Johanne Bloch 68'; Julie Nørgaard 79'	Stadium: Sparekassen Danmark Park Dronninglund; Referee: Bjarke Møller Thuen

12 August 2026 8	Fuglebakken KFUM (5)	1–3	FC Thy-Thisted Q (1)	Aarhus
18:00 UTC+2	Frida Nygaard 83' (pen.)	Report	Camilla Dybdahl 10', 69'; Frederikke Bruun 64'	Stadium: NTG Road Arena; Referee: Michael Ø.B. Kunath

12 August 2026 9	DSIO (6)	0–3	OKS (5)	Odense
18:00 UTC+2		Report		Stadium: Enghaveskolen
Note: The home side, DSIO, forfeited the match.

12 August 2026 10	Søhus IF (6)	3–0	Sønderborg Q/GB (4)	Odense
18:00 UTC+2	Iben Jul Jensen 27'; Line Pedersen 57'; Goncalves 83'	Report		Stadium: Rema 1000 Søhus Arena; Referee: Benno Skytte

12 August 2026 11	Haderslev FK (4)	2–6	Esbjerg fB (2)	Haderslev
18:00 UTC+2	Camilla Brink 37', 44'	Report	Vilja Dahl 25', 47', 63'; Eline Lund 30'; Emilie Billing 51'; Emma Foldager 80'	Stadium: Haderslev Athletics Stadium; Referee: Rene Hougaard Hansen

12 August 2026 12	Dalum/Næsby (3)	0–9	OB Q (1)	Odense
18:00 UTC+2		Report	Rexbye 12', 26', 62', 77'; Yde 14', 71'; Ilijoski 29'; Stubgaard 58'; Signe Lorentzen 83'	Stadium: Dalum Stadium; Referee: Julie Alsbro Thomsen

12 August 2026 13	Føroyar (5)	0–6	Fredensborg BI (3)	Copenhagen
18:00 UTC+2		Report	Dige 21'; Wargo 23', 27', 37', 84'; Sofie Mikkelsen 57'	Stadium: Kløvermarken Sports Facilities; Referee: Morten Kuld Jacobsen

12 August 2026 14	Lyngby 1921 (6)	0–0 (a.e.t.) (3–4 p)	Skjold (4)	Kongens Lyngby
18:00 UTC+2		Report		Stadium: Lyngby Stadium; Referee: Mie Lukassen Jørgensen
	Penalties
	Anna Sofie Dahl Andersen (penalty scored); Maya Bruun (penalty scored); Phoenix (penalty scored); Anna Kaas (penalty missed); Kebé (penalty missed)		(penalty scored) O'Connor; (penalty scored) Scharff; (penalty scored) Hybel; (penalty missed) Sofie Buch Hoyer; (penalty scored) Sølvborg

12 August 2026 15	Skjold Birkerød (6)	0–1	Fremad Valby (3)	Birkerød
18:00 UTC+2		Report	Terkelsen 64'	Stadium: Birkerød Stadium; Referee: Karabey Kara

12 August 2026 16	BS 72 (4)	0–3	B.93 (2)	Albertslund
18:00 UTC+2		Report		Stadium: Sporting Grounds South
Note: The home side, BS 72, forfeited the match.

12 August 2026 17	B73 Slagelse (3)	–	Slagelse
18:00 UTC+2		Report	Stadium: Stadium West
Note: B73 Slagelse are on to the 2nd round due to an uneven number of teams and thus did not play a match in this round.

12 August 2026 18	Heimdal (5)	0–3	Ølstykke (4)	Copenhagen
18:30 UTC+2		Report	Jønholt 27'; Pointinger 32', 55'	Stadium: Fælledparken; Referee: Marcus Victor Thomsen

12 August 2026 19	Støvring (4)	0–2	IF Lyseng (4)	Støvring
18:30 UTC+2		Report	Hannah Foss 14'; Ida Kirkegaard 27'	Stadium: Rema 1000 Parken Støvring; Referee: Allan Leander Mikkelsen

12 August 2026 20	Egebjerg (6)	0–12	Vejle B (4)	Vester Skerninge
18:45 UTC+2		Report	Caroline Cramer 3'; Frida Riis Møller 12'; Alberte Sommer 24'; Laura Mølgaard Jepsen 39'; Skelde 44'; Trine Thisgaard 46', 76'; Bendorf 49', 71'; Makne 51', 81'; Nicoline Storgaard 78'	Stadium: Ulbølle Stadium; Referee: Brian Hansen

12 August 2026 21	Silkeborg Q (3)	3–2 (a.e.t.)	AaB (2)	Silkeborg
19:00 UTC+2	M. Nørby (??); A. Damgaard (??); Stærmose (??)	Report	Hagsten (??); TBA (??)	Stadium: Søholt Idrætsanlæg; Referee: Vivi Grewy Kattenhøj

12 August 2026 22	Næstved HG (2)	0–7	Copenhagen (1)	Næstved
19:00 UTC+2		Report	Saini 16', 17', 52'; Sigurvinsdóttir 41'; Fuhlendorff 50', 78'; Børkop 83' (pen.)	Stadium: Næstved Stadium; Referee: Zascha A. Sparving

13 August 2026 23	BSF (3)	6–0	Nørrebro United (6)	Ballerup
18:30 UTC+2	S. Sønderup 25', 74'; Hemdorff 30'; Katja Larsen 68'; Nikoline Andersen 81'; Kodal 84'	Report		Stadium: Ballerup Stadium; Referee: Mie Lukassen Jørgensen

19 August 2026 24	Allerød FK (5)	0–9	Østerbro IF (1)	Allerød
18:00 UTC+2		Report	Julie Offersen 10'; Laura Gewitz 34'; Andrea Ougaard 37'; Olivia Haaber 39'; Paula Groth-Hansen 69', 75', 76'; Cecilie Bergholt 78'; Kristine Dueholm 89'	Stadium: Allerød Sports Park; Referee: Claus Meller

19 August 2026 25	Svogerslev (3)	2–0	Hellerup IK (4)	Roskilde
19:00 UTC+2	Marie Louise Fagerstrøm 13'; Natasha Jensen 35'	Report		Stadium: Svogerslev Sports Park; Referee: Mie Lukassen Jørgensen

20 August 2026 26	Ry (6)	1–4	Randers Q (3)	Ry
18:45 UTC+2	Mathilde Brøgger Børglum 77'	Report	Frida Svanholm 45', 60'; Julie K. Christensen 58'; Mia Knudsen 67'	Stadium: INOX Park; Referee: Rasmus Burian

== Second round ==
A total of 32 teams played in the second round: the six A-Liga clubs from the previous season's championship play-offs (AGF, Brøndby, Fortuna Hjørring, HB Køge, Kolding, and Nordsjælland) entered at this stage along with the 26 winners from the first round. The draw was made on 25 August 2026.

Number of teams per tier still in the competition
1		2	3	4	5	6	Tier
A-Liga champ.	A-Liga qual.	B-Liga qual.	C-Liga qual.	Denmark Series	Denmark Series Local	Series 1	Total
6 / 6	6 / 6	4 / 6	8 / 10	5 / 12	2 / 9	1 / 8	32 / 57

8 September 2026 27	Fredensborg BI (3)	0–10	HB Køge (1)	Fredensborg
17:45 UTC+2		Report	Óskarsdóttir 2'; Wendicke 21', 37', 86'; Thygesen 41'; Hermann 44', 58'; Alma Hansen 53', 68'; Baltersen 90'	Stadium: Fredensborg Stadium; Referee: Daniel Kirk

8 September 2026 28	Søhus IF (6)	0–1	Vejle B (4)	Odense
18:30 UTC+2		Report	Bendorf 90'	Stadium: Rema 1000 Søhus Arena; Referee: Ali Hassan

8 September 2026 29	Skjold (4)	0–5	Østerbro IF (1)	Østerbro
19:30 UTC+2		Report	Brouer 6'; Thyrrestrup 13'; Offersen 29'; Haaber 69', 87'	Stadium: Fælledparken; Referee: Faridoon Razi

9 September 2026 30	Brabrand IF (3)	0–7	Midtjylland (1)	Brabrand
17:00 UTC+2		Report	Uhd 29', 33'; Emma Nielsen 40'; Dybdahl 62', 74', 78'; Mølholm Jørgensen 67'	Stadium: Brabrand IF Sports Facilities; Referee: Oliver Markussen

9 September 2026 31	OKS (5)	0–11	OB Q (1)	Odense
17:00 UTC+2		Report	Yde 9'; Rexbye 13', 22', 36', 40'; Andrea Friis 30'; Lorentzen 42'; Sehested 65'; Anna Riis 67'; Pauli 76'; Wadstrøm 85'	Stadium: OKSON Park; Referee: Thomas Isen

9 September 2026 32	Aarhus 1900 (4)	0–9	Fortuna Hjørring (1)	Aarhus
17:30 UTC+2		Report	Watanabe 7', 36'; Lynnerup 8', 19', 24', 83'; Kostmayer 53'; Julie Andersen 76' (o.g.); Frænde Westergaard 79'	Stadium: Fort Langenæs; Referee: Omid Zadeh

9 September 2026 33	IF Lyseng (4)	3–1	FC Thy-Thisted Q (1)	Højbjerg
18:00 UTC+2	Jalles 10'; Ida Kirkegaard 37', 62'	Report	Gaarn 64'	Stadium: Aura Park; Referee: Emil Terkelsen

9 September 2026 34	Sundby (2)	0–4	Nordsjælland (1)	Amager
18:00 UTC+2		Report	Scheuer 16'; Thea Petersen 29'; Mulvad 45'; Antvorskov 88'	Stadium: Kløvermarken Sports Facilities; Referee: Zascha Sparving

9 September 2026 35	Ølstykke (4)	1–6	B.93 (2)	Ølstykke
19:00 UTC+2	Pokorny Quitzau 67'	Report	Frederikke Petersen 13'; Klitte 20'; Drewes 33'; Roque-Krag 45'; Guy 60'; Holse 90'	Stadium: Ølstykke Stadium; Referee: Emilie Langthaler

9 September 2026 36	Fremad Valby (3)	0–0 (a.e.t.) (3–4 p)	BSF (3)	Valby
19:00 UTC+2		Report		Stadium: Valby Idrætspark; Referee: Faridoon Razi

9 September 2026 37	Svogerslev (3)	0–8	Copenhagen (1)	Roskilde
19:00 UTC+2		Report	Torp 4' (o.g.); Leskinen 27'; Fuhlendorff 32'; Maja Johansson 43'; Boisen 46'; Hemmingsen 65', 73'; Roberts 88'	Stadium: Svogerslev Sports Park; Referee: Philip Warburg

9 September 2026 38	B73 Slagelse (3)	0–10	ASA (1)	Slagelse
19:30 UTC+2		Report	Moss 22', 38'; Ida Eriksen 39', 45', 83', 90'; Hauge 43'; Fabricius 58'; Dam Schrøder 74'; Ida Thomsen 82'	Stadium: Stadium West; Referee: Christian Faber-Faldborg

15 September 2026 39	Randers Q (3)	2–3	Viborg FF (2)	Randers
17:00 UTC+2	Signe Duun 39', 91'	Report	Frida Smed 63'; Alberte Hald 79'; Fria Brix 84' (o.g.)	Stadium: Romalt Stadium; Referee: Finn Lovring

15 September 2026 40	Vallensbæk IF (5)	0–16	Brøndby (1)	Vallensbæk
18:30 UTC+2		Report	Buchberg 2', 12', 64'; Thestrup 6', 68', 76'; Frandsen 15', 34', 45', 51'; Kaya Mortensen 25'; Messerli 30', 37', 77'; Emma Benn 74'; Emilia Gram 89'	Stadium: Vallensbæk Sports Center; Referee: Ercan Sorucu

16 September 2026 41	Silkeborg Q (3)	0–8	AGF (1)	Silkeborg
19:00 UTC+2		Report	Lerche 10', 42' (pen.), 65'; Braithwaite 13'; Harsløf 30'; Karoline Bonde Lauritsen 36' (o.g.); Lundberg 67'; Holt 82'	Stadium: JYSK Park; Referee: Rasmus Burian

16 September 2026 42	Esbjerg fB (2)	0–3	Kolding IF (1)	Varde
19:00 UTC+2		Report	Lund 30'; S. Amby 45'; Christensen 56'	Stadium: Vestjysk Bank Stadium; Referee: Niklas Andersen

== Third round ==
A total of 16 teams will play in the third round. The draw was made on 15 September 2026 by Brøndby vice-captain Julie Madsen and featured two derbies — a Copenhagen derby between Østerbro and Copenhagen, which Copenhagen won 3–0, and an Aarhus derby where IF Lyseng hosts ASA for the their first ever third-round Danish Cup match. B.93's main sponsors, ACT Architects, paid for the match providing free entrance for spectators.

Number of teams per tier still in the competition
1		2	3	4	5	6	Tier
A-Liga champ.	A-Liga qual.	B-Liga qual.	C-Liga qual.	Denmark Series	Denmark Series Local	Series 1	Total
6 / 6	5 / 6	2 / 6	1 / 10	2 / 12	0 / 9	0 / 8	16 / 57

20 October 2026 43	Østerbro IF (1)	0–3	Copenhagen (1)	Østerbro
19:00 UTC+2		Report	Sigurvinsdóttir 67'; Fuhlendorff 73'; Boisen 90'	Stadium: Østerbro Stadium; Attendance: 450; Referee: Emilie Langthaler

21 October 2026 44	IF Lyseng (4)	2–8	ASA (1)	Højbjerg
18:00 UTC+2	Goal	Report	Binderup 12', 24', 67'; Ahrendtsen 30'; Jusjong 32'; Schrøder 72'; Stær 75'; Ida Thomsen 78'	Stadium: AURA Park; Referee: Kristian Slæbo
Note: IF Lyseng's first ever third round participation in the Danish Cup.

21 October 2026 45	Viborg FF (2)	2–3	AGF (1)	Viborg
19:00 UTC+2	Danielsen 76'; Nørskov 92'	Report	Johansen 30'; Lerche 32'; Rasmussen 45'	Stadium: Liseborg Centre; Referee: Patrick Remon Gammelholm

21 October 2026 46	Kolding IF (1)	1–5	Fortuna Hjørring (1)	Kolding
19:00 UTC+2	Ludvigsen 62'	Report	Olar 12', 59'; Dyrehauge 39'; Westin 45'; Watanabe 54'	Stadium: Kolding Stadium; Referee: Julie Alsbro

21 October 2026 47	BSF (3)	1–5	OB Q (1)	Ballerup
19:00 UTC+2	S. Sønderup 66'	Report	Bech 4'; Rexbye 8', 10', 13', 78'	Stadium: Ballerup Stadium; Referee: Mahsa Ghorbani

21 October 2026 48	Vejle B (4)	0–6	Midtjylland (1)	Vejle
19:00 UTC+2		Report	Givskov 9'; Dybdahl 18', 54'; Uhd 23'; Jessen 37'; Jeppesen 80'	Stadium: VB Park; Referee: Nicolai Viig Nørkjær

4 November 2026 49	B.93 (2)	0–6	Brøndby (1)	Østerbro
18:00 UTC+1		Report	Thestrup 17'; Andersson 29', 53'; Engesvik 43'; Buchberg 68'; Mortensen 72'	Stadium: Svanemøllen Facilities; Attendance: 641; Referee: Kasper Madsen
Note: B.93's club sponsors ACT Architects paid for the event to provide free entrance for all. The 641 spectators set the attendance record for a B.93 match (women).

4 November 2026 50	HB Køge (1)	2–0	Nordsjælland (1)	Køge
19:00 UTC+1	Witek 20'; Thygesen 49'	Report		Stadium: Køge Stadium; Referee: Jacob Stausgaard Kobberrød

== Quarter-finals ==
The draw was made on 4 November 2026 by HB Køge player Mai Wendicke.

Number of teams per tier still in the competition
1		2	3	4	5	6	Tier
A-Liga champ.	A-Liga qual.	B-Liga qual.	C-Liga qual.	Denmark Series	Denmark Series Local	Series 1	Total
4 / 6	4 / 6	0 / 6	0 / 10	0 / 12	0 / 9	0 / 8	8 / 57

1 March 2027	HB Køge	v	Brøndby
18:00 UTC+2			Goal

1 March 2027	OB Q	v	AGF
18:00 UTC+2			Goal

1 March 2027	Midtjylland	v	ASA
18:00 UTC+2			Goal

1 March 2027	Copenhagen	v	Fortuna Hjørring
18:00 UTC+2			Goal

== Top goalscorers ==
As of 21 October 2026

#	Player	Club	Goals
1	(Denmark) Camille Rexbye	OB Q	12
2	(Denmark) Sissel Bøje	Sundby	7
3	(Denmark) Rikke Dybdahl	Midtjylland	5
3	(Denmark) Ida Eriksen	ASA	5
3	(Denmark) Ida Kirkegaard	Lyseng	5
6	(Denmark) Melanie Frandsen	Brøndby	4
6	(Denmark) Sille Fuhlendorff	Copenhagen	4
6	(Denmark) Mie Lerche	AGF	4
6	(Denmark) Emma Lynnerup	Fortuna Hjørring	4
6	(Denmark) Julie Wargo	Fredensborg BI	4

== See also ==
- 2026–27 A-Liga
- 2026–27 B-Liga
- 2026–27 C-Liga

== Sources ==
- "Pokalturnering (Kvinder): Resultater, Stilling & Kampprogram | Fodbold | DR". www.dr.dk (in Danish).
- "Danish Cup Women 2026/2027". www.soccerway.com.
- "KvindePokalen | Stilling, resultater & kampprogram". Bold (in Danish).
