= 2024–25 Danish Women's Cup =

2024–25 Danish Cup
Tournament details
- Country: Denmark
- Dates: 13 August 2024 – 17 May 2025
- Teams: 58

Final positions
- Champions: Fortuna Hjørring (11th title)
- Runners-up: Nordsjælland

Tournament statistics
- Matches played: 58
- Goals scored: 289 (4.98 per match)
- Top goal scorer: (Denmark) Amalie Lund (8 goals)
- Goals scored in penalty shoot-outs not included.

The 2024–25 Danish Cup was the 32nd edition of the Danish Cup. 2024 first-time winners Nordsjælland were the defending champions.

Aalborg Freja had a cup run and became the sole non-league team to advance to the quarter-finals, following their victory against ASA in the third round. They lost in time added on to Copenhagen.

== Teams ==
A total of 58 teams entered the 2024–25 Danish Cup. Six preliminary rounds took place in the non-league tiers (4–7) of the Danish football league system, overseen by the six respective regional departments of the Danish Football Association (DBU), culminating in 31 participating teams. 21 were from the Danish League, 1st Division, and 2nd Division play-offs of the 2023–24 season. For the second round, the six teams from the previous season's Danish League championship play-offs joined the competition to face the 26 winners of the first round. This edition featured 31 from the non-league tiers where there are usually 30, as the reserve in the third tier do not participate in the cup.

Phase	Entering	Advancing	Matches	Begins
First round (52 teams)	31 clubs from the non-league tiers (4–6); 9 clubs from the C-Liga play-offs; 6 clubs from B-Liga play-offs; 6 clubs from A-Liga play-offs	—N/a	26	13 August 2024
Second round (32 teams)	6 clubs from the A-Liga championship play-offs	26 winners from the first round	16	10 September 2024
Third round (16 teams)	—N/a	16 winners from the second round	8	1 October 2024
Quarter-finals (8 teams)	—N/a	8 winners from the third round	4	8 March 2025
Semi-finals (4 teams)	—N/a	4 winners from the quarter-finals	4 (Note: Teams play each other home and away.)	29 March 2025
Final (2 teams)	—N/a	2 winners from the semi-finals	1	17 May 2025

=== League ===
Danish League (tier 1)
6 teams – 2023–24 championship play-offs	6 teams – 2023–24 qualification play-offs
AGF; Brøndby; Fortuna Hjørring; HB Køge; Kolding IF; Nordsjælland	B.93; Næstved HG; OB Q; FC Thy-Thisted Q; Østerbro; AaB
1st Division (tier 2)	2nd Division (tier 3)
6 teams – 2023–24 qualification play-offs	9 of 12 teams – 2023–24 play-offs (Note: Reserve teams are not eligible.)
ASA; BSF; Midtjylland; Solrød; Sundby; Varde IF	Group 1 (East): Allerød; B73 Slagelse; Copenhagen (Note: Competed as FC Damsø in the 2023–24 season.); Dalum/Næsby; Vejle B; Group 2 (West): Brabrand; EfB (Note: Replaced FC King George in the first round roster.); JAI Aarhus; Viborg FF

=== Non-league ===
Preliminary rounds (tiers 4–6)
14 (13 + 1) teams – Eastern Denmark	17 (15 + 2) teams – Western Denmark
DBU Copenhagen: BK Skjold; FA 2000; Fremad Valby; KFUM Copenhagen; DBU Lolland-Falster: Nykøbing; DBU Zealand: Albertsund BS72; Brødeskov; Ringsted; Rødovre; Snekkersten; Svogerslev; Vallensbæk; Virum-Sorgenfri; Ølstykke	DBU Funen: Bolbro; B 1913; OKS; Strib; Søhus Stige; DBU Jutland: Give Fremad; Lemvig; Randers Q; Ry; Silkeborg Q; Skive; Skødstrup; Stensballe; Sønderborg Q; Vejgaard B; Aalborg Chang; Aalborg Freja

== Schedule ==
The 2024–25 Kvindepokal is scheduled as follows. So far, only autumn dates have been published.

Round	Matches
First round	14–15 August 2024, 21 August 2024, 3 September 2024
Second round	8–10 September 2024, 17–19 September 2024
Round of 16	1–3 October 2024, 8–10 October 2024
Quarter-finals	TBD
Semi-finals	TBD
Final	TBD

Times up to 27 October 2024 are CEST (UTC+2). Times from 28 October 2024 are CET (UTC+1).

== First round ==
A total of 52 teams play in the first round: 21 teams from the previous season's qualification play-offs in the top three tiers – 9 from the 2nd Division (tier 3), 6 from the 1st Division (tier 2) and 6 from the Danish League (tier 1); as well as 31 non-league teams that qualified for the tournament in the non-league qualifications taking place in the spring; 7 from Series 1 (tier 6), 12 from the Denmark Series Local (tier 5), and 12 from the Denmark Series (tier 4).

The winner of the matches that end in a draw is decided in an extra time or, if still tied, by penalty shoot-out.

Number of teams per tier still in the competition
1		2	3	4	5	6	Tier
Danish League champ. (Note: The Danish League championship play-off teams from the previous season join in the second round.)	Danish League qual.	1st Division qual.	2nd Division qual.	Denmark Series	Denmark Series Local	Series 1	Total
6 / 6	6 / 6	6 / 6	9 / 9	12 / 12	12 / 12	7 / 7	58 / 58

14 August 2024	Bolbro (5)	0–12	OB Q (1)	Bolbro-Parken
18:30		Report	I. Kloock-Jensen 9', 63'; Krog 10', 46', 51'; French 15', 43'; Jensen 40', 83'; Pauli Jørgensen 71'; S. Kloock-Jensen 80', 89'	Referee: Jacob Beyer Schierff

14 August 2024	Aalborg Chang (5)	0–9	FC Thy-Thisted Q (1)	Sparekassen Danmark Park
18:30		Report	Givskov 10'; Lindekrantz 15'; Billing 20'; Heeb 25', 30'; Fink 35', 60', 70'; Christensen 80'	Referee: Casper Petersen

14 August 2024	Aalborg Freja (4)	1–0	AaB (1)	Steka Bolig Park
18:30	Nørgaard 88'	Report		Referee: Ole Lund

14 August 2024	Vejgaard B (5)	4–2	Randers Q (4)	Spar Nord Arena
18:30	M. Larsen 7'; Bech 42' (o.g.); Rafn 46'; Beermann 69'	Report	Knudsen 45', 85'	Referee: Henrik Hejndorf Haack

14 August 2024	Skødstrup (5)	0–4	Viborg (3)	Studstrup Idrætsanlæg
18:30		Report	Danielsen 6', 19', 24'; Nørskov 50'	Referee: Deniz Demirci

14 August 2024	Ry (6)	0–14	ASA (2)	INOX Park
18:30		Report	Eriksen 3', 90'; Linde 9', 52', 53', 67', 88'; Nielsen 37'; Pedersen 44'; Yde Hedegaard 47'; Hauge 57'; Thyrrestrup 71', 80'; Ahrendtsen Jensen 81'	Referee: Sondre Jørgensen

14 August 2024	Brabrand (3)	5–0	JAI Aarhus (3)	Brabrand IF's Idrætsanlæg
18:30	Kaagaard Dahl 7'; Skovgaard Mertz 41'; Svensson-Olesen 53'; Berg 55'; Andersen 78'	Report		Referee: Asger Bing

14 August 2024	Skive (4)	0–14	Midtjylland (2)	Egeris Idrætsanlæg
18:30		Report	Jepsen 6'; Kaihøj 7', 16'; Dybdahl 10', 30', 47'; Fruensgaard 19'; Rathe 38'; Aarhus 52', 88'; Vestermark 64', 77'; Noesgaard 82'; Binderup 86'	Referee: Carsten Jensen

14 August 2024	Lemvig (5)	0–3	Silkeborg Q (4)	Lemvig Stadion
18:30		Report
Note: The home side, Lemvig, forfeited the match.

14 August 2024	Sønderborg Q (5)	1–7	Varde IF (2)	Bygma Park
18:30	Schrøder Petersen 83'	Report	A. Lund 8', 15', 38', 44'; Nørret 11'; Jeppesen 71'; E. Lund 85'	Referee: Rene Hougaard Hansen

14 August 2024	OKS (5)	6–1	Stensballe (5)	OKSON-Park
18:30	Madsen 17', 60'; Bogh Jensby 31'; Bjarnt 53'; Kildegaard 53', 82'	Report	unknown player 85'	Referee: Lucas Gejbøl

14 August 2024	Strib (6)	0–7	Dalum/Næsby (3)	Strib fritids- & aktivitetscenter
18:30		Report	Jensen 9', 36'; Søderholm 33', 44'; Ølgaard Nielsen 66'; Skyttegaard Krebs 75'; Jessen 88'	Referee: Jesper Ellitsgaard Steffensen

14 August 2024	B 1913 (4)	1–0	EfB (3)	Campus Road
18:30	Madsen 74'	Report		Referee: Michael Jensen

14 August 2024	Ringsted Pigefodbold (5)	0–6	Solrød (2)	Ringsted Stadion
18:30		Report	Nordbeck 40'; Bøje 42', 50', 59'; Midtgaard 45'; Jensen 73'	Referee: Lennarth Pedersen

14 August 2024	Søhus Stige (4)	1–3	B 73 Slagelse (3)	Rema 1000 Søhus Arena
18:30	Goncalves 11'	Report	Særkjær Rutkjær 3'; Knudsen 34'; Lillelund 75'	Referee: Thomas Isen

14 August 2024	Nykøbing (5)	0–5	Næstved HG (1)	Nykøbing FC
18:30		Report	Ringsing 5', 40', 48'; Schrøder 38', 47'	Referee: Michael Gutti

14 August 2024	Snekkersten (6)	1–2	Rødovre (4)	Snekkersten Idrætscenter
18:30	Juel Olsson 76'	Report	Emanuel 34' (pen.); Koch Bjerre 39'	Referee: Christian Nejstgaard

14 August 2024	Svogerslev (4)	1–7	Copenhagen (3)	Svogerslev Idrætspark
18:30	Gregers 6'	Report	Lech 5', 39', 44'; Brandt 47', 48'; Bergmann 57'; Dalsten 68'	Referee: Henrik Them Christensen

14 August 2024	Ølstykke (4)	1–0	BK Skjold (4)	Ølstykke Stadion
18:30	Viborg 68' (pen.)	Report		Referee: Carsten Kühn Christiansen

14 August 2024	Vallensbæk (6)	0–16	B.93 (1)	Vallensbæk Idrætscenter
18:30		Report	Hansen 14', 18'; Hvidbak 20'; Bech 21', 35', 37'; Høgild 47', 77', 86'; Weatherall 50', 82', 88'; Schultz-Petersen 53'; Nicolaisen 61'; Benfeldt Sørensen 69', 84'	Referee: Christian Faber-Faldborg

14 August 2024	Virum-Sorgenfri (6)	0–3	Allerød (3)	Virum Stadion
18:30		Report	Kolind Haunsø 36', 57'; Hilt Nissen 86'	Referee: Simon Fenger Jensen

14 August 2024	Albertsund BS72 (4)	3–2	Fremad Valby (4)	Sportspladsen i Syd
18:30	Christensen 11' (pen.), 54'; Brandt Andersen 53'	Report	Terkelsen 3'; Sørensen 85'	Referee: Tim Mikkelsen

14 August 2024	Brødeskov (5)	0–9	Østerbro (1)	Brødeskov Stadion
19:00		Report	Offersen 9', 42', 80', 87'; Broch-Lips 13'; Gade 19', 20'; Mellergaard 29'; Godvin 77'	Referee: Thomas Brun

15 August 2024	Give Fremad (6)	1–4	Vejle B (3)	Give Stadion
18:30	Kristensen	Report	Nortvig Bendorf 3', 9'; Rasmussen Makne 12'; Zoega Olesen 28'	Referee: Sabit Begic

21 August 2024	FA 2000 (5)	0–6	Sundby (2)	Jens Jessens Vej
19:00		Report	Weischendorff 12'; Langhorn 18'; Vestergaard Heron 29'; Willems 45' (o.g.); Toutouh 65'; el Hassani 88'	Referee: Zascha A. Jensen

3 September 2024	KFUM Copenhagen (6)	0–3	BSF (2)	Emdrupparken
19:00		Report	Pedersen 16', 90'; Rydahl 18'	Referee: Brian Andersen

== Second round ==
The teams from the 2023–24 championship round of the Women's League enter the competition in the second round.

Number of teams per tier still in the competition
1		2	3	4	5	6	Tier
Danish League champ.	Danish League qual.	1st Division qual.	2nd Division qual.	Denmark Series	Denmark Series Local	Series 1	Total
6 / 6	5 / 6	6 / 6	7 / 9	6 / 12	2 / 12	0 / 7	32 / 58

10 September 2024	Vejle B (3)	0–4	HB Køge (1)	Vejle
17:30 CEST (UTC+2)		Report	Garcia 17', 32'; Winther 25'; Holt 84'	Stadium: VB Parken; Referee: Simon Frisk Kjær Kristensen

10 September 2024	Kolding IF (1)	1–2	OB Q (1)	Kolding
18:30 CEST (UTC+2)	Guldager 58'	Report	Bang 9', 47'	Stadium: Autocentralen Park; Referee: Martin Kjærgaard

11 September 2024	Brabrand (3)	0–9	AGF (1)	Brabrand
17:30 CEST (UTC+2)		Report	Høgh Faurskov 10', 27', 45'; Rasmussen 52', 80'; Winther Johansen 54', 78'; Høgh Nielsen 60'; Dyrehauge Hansen 82'	Stadium: Brabrand Stadion; Referee: Mikkel Gertsen

11 September 2024	Midtjylland (2)	0–1	Fortuna Hjørring (1)	Vildbjerg
17:30 CEST (UTC+2)		Report	Omewa 77'	Stadium: Vildbjerg Sports- & Kulturcenter; Referee: Jacob Rasmussen

11 September 2024	B 73 Slagelse (3)	1–1 (a.e.t.) (3–4 p)	Næstved HG (1)	Slagelse
17:30 CEST (UTC+2)	Pedersen 90'	Report	Krogh Hansen 32'	Stadium: Stadion Vest; Referee: Anders Foght
	Penalties
	Thrane (penalty scored); Pedersen (penalty scored); Krogager (penalty missed); Juhl Nielsen (penalty missed); Carkaci (penalty scored)		(penalty missed) Dam Schrøder; (penalty scored) Krag-Andersen; (penalty scored) Neumann Andersen; (penalty scored) Wroblewski; (penalty scored) Ringsing

11 September 2024	OKS (5)	0–4	Dalum/Næsby (3)	Odense
17:30 CEST (UTC+2)		Report	Ølgaard Nielsen 5'; Grave 6', 37'; Ørskov Jensen 50'	Stadium: OKSON-Park; Referee: Thomas Isen

11 September 2024	Rødovre (4)	2–4	Sundby (2)	Rødovre
17:30 CEST (UTC+2)	Henriksen 68'; Kempf 80'	Report	Prebensen 13', 46'; Winther 66'; Klitaa 90+2'	Stadium: Rødovre Stadion; Referee: Zascha A. Jensen

11 September 2024	Albertsund BS72 (4)	0–2	Østerbro (1)	Albertslund
18:30 CEST (UTC+2)		Report	Foss Gade 75'; Seistrup 84'	Stadium: Sportspladsen i Syd; Referee: Christian Faber-Faldborg

11 September 2024	Ølstykke (4)	0–7	Brøndby (1)	Ølstykke
18:30 CEST (UTC+2)		Report	Bischoff 22', 32'; Borbye 44', 79'; C. Larsen 45'; Tavlo 52'; Christiansen 66' (pen.)	Stadium: Ølstykke Stadion; Referee: Philip Warburg

11 September 2024	ASA (2)	2–1	FC Thy-Thisted Q (1)	Aarhus
18:30 CEST (UTC+2)	Ahrendtsen Jensen 46', 59'	Report	Mikkelsen 17'	Stadium: Koncenton Park; Referee: Kell Thyre

11 September 2024	B 1913 (4)	0–8	Varde IF (2)	Odense
18:30 CEST (UTC+2)		Report	Jeppesen 15'; Grønvall Andersen 16'; Lund 26', 30', 34'; Birgertoft 43'; Worning Nørret 49', 50'	Stadium: Campus Road; Referee: Henrik Madsen

11 September 2024	Silkeborg Q (4)	2–3	Aalborg Freja (4)	Silkeborg
19:00 CEST (UTC+2)	Birk Svendsen 22', 42'	Report	Vang Sørensen 59'; Justesen 69'; Nørgaard 72'	Stadium: Søholt Idrætsanlæg; Referee: Sune Feddersen

11 September 2024	Copenhagen (3)	5–1	Allerød (3)	Vanløse
19:00 CEST (UTC+2)	Dalsten 34', 47'; Børkop 56'; Balle 65' (o.g.); Løvenfald 69'	Report	Malle 76'	Stadium: Vanløse Idrætspark; Referee: Jonas Bülow-Olsen

12 September 2024	Vejgaard B (5)	3–0	Viborg (3)	Aalborg
17:30 CEST (UTC+2)	Jakobsen 5'; Grøn 44'; Beermann 49'	Report		Stadium: Spar Nord Arena; Referee: Ejub Avdic

17 September 2024	BSF (2)	0–8	B.93 (1)	Ballerup
18:30 CEST (UTC+2)		Report	Nicolaisen 15', 26'; Nanziri 30', 63'; Unn Klitte 45'; Mentze Rhode 82'; Weatherall 83'; Schjerbech Bech 87'	Stadium: Ballerup Idrætspark; Referee: Alexander Mygind Dreyer

18 September 2024	Solrød (2)	1–7	Nordsjælland (1)	Solrød Strand
17:00 CEST (UTC+2)	Bøje 88'	Report	Tingager 12', 38'; Funch 32'; Siren 41'; la Cour 50', 57', 76'	Stadium: Solrød Idrætscenter; Referee: Sebastian Friis Aagerup

== Third round ==
Number of teams per tier still in the competition
1		2	3	4	5	6	Tier
Danish League champ.	Danish League qual.	1st Division qual.	2nd Division qual.	Denmark Series	Denmark Series Local	Series 1	Total
5 / 6	4 / 6	3 / 6	2 / 9	1 / 12	1 / 12	0 / 7	16 / 58

1 October 2024	Sundby (2)	0–1 (a.e.t.)	Copenhagen (3)	Copenhagen
19:00 UTC+2		Report	Emma Brandt 94'	Stadium: Kløvermarken Sports Facilities; Referee: Ebbe Baardsen

2 October 2024	Dalum/Næsby (3)	0–6	Fortuna Hjørring (1)	Odense
18:30 UTC+2		Report	Frank 9', 79'; Farkas 33', 35'; Risako Watanabe 51', 64'	Stadium: Odense Athletics Stadium; Referee: Faruk Iriskic

2 October 2024	AGF (1)	2–1	OB Q (1)	Viby J
19:00 UTC+2	Mariann Høgh 28'; Baattrup 52'	Report	Sanders 85'	Stadium: Fredensvang; Referee: Kenneth Dahl Sørensen

9 October 2024	Østerbro (1)	0–2	Brøndby (1)	Copenhagen
19:00 UTC+2		Report	Linnéa Borbye 27'; Karlsen 61'	Stadium: Valby Idrætspark; Referee: Jakob Brendstrup Hansen

9 October 2024	Aalborg Freja (4)	3–2	ASA (2)	Aalborg
19:00 UTC+2	Julie Madsen 24'; Frida Vang 31'; Stine Maach 90'	Report	Ulrikke Linde 10'; Sarah Serup 90' (o.g.)	Stadium: Gardian Park; Referee: Casper Petersen

9 October 2024	Vejgaard B (5)	0–1	Varde IF (2)	Gistrup
19:15 UTC+2		Report	Amalie Lund 2'	Stadium: Gistrup Facilities; Referee: Michel Valdemar

15 October 2024	Næstved HG (1)	0–1	HB Køge (1)	Næstved
18:00 UTC+2		Report	Emilie Holt 19'	Stadium: JHH Park; Referee: Philip Warburg

15 October 2024	Nordsjælland (1)	3–0	B.93 (1)	Farum
18:30 UTC+2	Ásgeirsdóttir 3', 70'; Alma Aagaard 10'	Report		Stadium: Right to Dream Park; Referee: Frederikke Søkjær

== Quarter-finals ==
Number of teams per tier still in the competition
1		2	3	4	5	6	Tier
Danish League champ.	Danish League qual.	1st Division qual.	2nd Division qual.	Denmark Series	Denmark Series Local	Series 1	Total
5 / 6	0 / 6	1 / 6	1 / 9	1 / 12	0 / 12	0 / 7	8 / 58

8 March 2025	HB Køge (1)	2–2 (a.e.t.) (1–4 p)	Fortuna Hjørring (1)	Køge
13:00 UTC+1	Sarah Thygesen 42'; Emilie Holt 80' (pen.)	Report	Omewa 71'; Ficzay 90'	Stadium: Køge Stadium; Referee: Mathias Lykke
	Penalties
	Emilie Holt (penalty missed); Nyman (penalty scored); Uhre (penalty missed)		Peltonen (penalty scored); Matsubara (penalty scored); Sydney Masur (penalty scored); Risako Watanabe (penalty scored)

8 March 2025	Varde IF (2)	1–3	Nordsjælland (1)	Varde
14:00 UTC+1	Eline Lund 41'	Report	Perrault 38'; Josefine Funch 45', 56'	Stadium: Vestjysk Bank Stadion; Referee: Rie Louise Rasmussen

8 March 2025	AGF (1)	0–1	Brøndby (1)	Viby J
14:00 UTC+1		Report	Christiansen 14' (pen.)	Stadium: Fredensvang; Referee: Julie Alsbro Thomsen

8 March 2025	Copenhagen (3)	4–3 (a.e.t.)	Aalborg Freja (4)	Vanløse
15:00 UTC+1	Anne Katrine Justesen 18' (o.g.); Louise Martens 24' (o.g.); Celine Dalsten 93', 116'	Report	Mathilde Eriksen 79' (pen.); Marie Pedersen 86'; Maria Juelsgård Jensen 107'	Stadium: Vanløse Idrætspark; Referee: Jesper Nielsen

== Top goalscorers ==
Rank	Player	Team	Goals
1	(Denmark) Amalie Lund	Varde	8
2	(Denmark) Ulrikke Linde	ASA	6
3	(Denmark) Celine Dalsten	Copenhagen	5
4	(Denmark) Mille Bech	B.93	4
4	(Denmark) Sissel Bøje	Solrød	4
4	(Denmark) Julie Offersen	Østerbro	4
4	(Denmark) Sofia Weatherall	B.93	4
8	22 players		3
