= 2026–27 C-Liga =

C-Liga
- Season: 2026–27
- Dates: 22 August 2026 – June 2027
- Matches: 54
- Goals: 168 (3.11 per match)
- Top goalscorer: Signe Lorentzen (9 goals)
- Biggest home win: OB Q II 7–1 Ølstykke (30 August 2026)
- Biggest away win: Valby 1–6 OB Q II (20 September 2026); Brabrand 0–5 Randers Q (24 October 2026)
- Highest scoring: OB Q II 4–6 BSF (23 August 2026)
- Longest winning run: 5 matches Fredensborg
- Longest unbeaten run: 8 matches Vejle B
- Longest winless run: 9 matches Ølstykke
- Longest losing run: 6 matches Ølstykke
- All statistics correct as of 19:00, 10 November 2026 (UTC). Only matches in the regular season are covered in the statistics

The 2026–27 C-Liga is the 6th season of the third tier of the Danish Women's Football League. From this season onwards the league consists of 12 teams, reduced from 14 the previous season.

== Teams ==
As of this season the league structure has changed to incorporate two further teams in A-Liga for a total of 10 teams, and reduce the C-Liga team total from 14 to 12 teams. Four teams were relegated to the Denmark Series from the 2025–26 C-Liga: B-73 Slagelse and Svogerslev BK from Group 1, and Dalum/Næsby from Group 2. JAI Fodbold dissolved and withdrew from the league, forfeiting the remainder of their season. The four teams promoted from the 2025–26 Denmark Series are Damsø (the Copenhagen reserve team), Ølstykke, Vejle, and VSK Aarhus (the AGF reserve team). Sundby and Viborg were promoted to the 2026–27 B-Liga.

=== Changes ===
ENTERING C-LIGA		EXITING C-LIGA	
▲ from 2025–26 Denmark Series	▼ from 2025–26 B-Liga	▲ to 2026–27 B-Liga	▼ to 2026–27 Denmark Series
FC Damsø; Ølstykke; Vejle; VSK	None due to new structure	Viborg; Sundby	Svogerslev BK; B73 Slagelse; Dalum/Næsby; JAI

=== Stadiums and locations ===
Locations of the 2026–27 C-Liga teams.

Team	Location	Stadium	Capacity
BSF	Ballerup	Ballerup Stadium	4,000
Brabrand	Brabrand	Brabrand Stadium	1,000
FC Damsø	Copenhagen	Vanløse Idrætspark	10,000
Fredensborg	Fredensborg	Fredensborg Stadium	2,000
Fremad Valby	Valby	Valby Idrætspark	2,000
OB Q II	Odense	Marienlyst Centre	1,000
Randers Q	Randers	Romalt Stadium	1,000
Silkeborg Q	Silkeborg	Søholt Sports Facility	1,000
Vejle B	Vejle	VB Parken	1,000
VSK Aarhus	Aarhus	Vejlby Stadium	12,000
Ølstykke	Ølstykke	Scan-Group Park	1,000
Aalborg Freja	Aalborg	Gardian Park	1,000

=== Personnel and kits ===
Team	Manager	Captain	Kit	Sponsor
BSF	(Denmark) Lars Sabroe & Steen Hansen (interim)	(Denmark) Monica Jegindø	(Spain) Joma	(United States) Four Points Flex by Sheraton
Brabrand	(Spain) Luis Lorente Carreras	(Denmark) Ane Jakobsen	(Denmark) Hummel	—N/a
Damsø	(Denmark) Susanne Præst	(Denmark) Freja Løvenfald	(Germany) Adidas	(Denmark) B&L Byg
Fredensborg	(Denmark) Rasmus Skovby	(Denmark) Marlene Nordal	(Germany) Puma	(Norway) REMA 1000
Fremad Valby	(Denmark) René Nielsen	(Denmark) Maja Albertsen	(Germany) Puma	(Denmark) Spar Nord (Denmark) Nykredit
OB Q II	(Denmark) Jakob Jensen	(Denmark) Maja Bødker	(Denmark) Hummel	—N/a
Randers Q	(Denmark) Morten Hyldgaard	(Denmark) Fria Brix	(Denmark) Hummel	(Denmark) Sparekassen Danmark
Silkeborg Q	(Denmark) Niklas Albech	(Denmark) Marie Nielsen	(Germany) Adidas	(Denmark) Jysk
Vejle	(Denmark) Finn Bendorf	(Denmark) Vibeke Juhl Jensen	(Germany) Adidas	(Denmark) Vejle Turisttrafik
VSK Aarhus	(Denmark) Morten Skarby	(Iceland) Snædís Arnarsdóttir	(Sweden) Craft	(Denmark) NMT El-Service
Ølstykke	(Denmark) Morten Skoubo	(Denmark) Jessica Pongkul	(United States) Nike	(Norway) REMA 1000
Aalborg Freja	(Denmark) David Rytter	(Denmark) Ellen Frank Mitchell	(Germany) Adidas	—N/a

=== Managerial changes ===
Team	Outgoing manager	Manner of departure	Date of vacancy	Rank	Incoming manager	Date of appointment
BSF	(Denmark) Uno Apold	Sacked	28 October 2026	4th	(Denmark) Lars Sabroe & Steen Hansen (interim)	28 October 2026
Fremad Valby	(Denmark) René Nielsen	Resigned	1 January 2027	TBD	(Denmark) Danni Kikkenborg (interim)	3 November 2026

== Group 1 (East) ==
=== Regular season ===
Pos	Team	Pld	W	D	L	GF	GA	GD	Pts	Qualification
1	Damsø (Note: Reserve teams are not permitted to advance beyond C-Liga (tier 3) as they must remain two leagues below the main team, and are automatically relegated to non-league Denmark Series (tier 4) or below if the main team gets relegated from the A-Liga.)	10	6	2	2	27	9	+18	20	C-Liga play-offs
2	OB Q II	10	6	1	3	32	21	+11	19	C-Liga play-offs
3	Fredensborg	10	6	1	3	15	13	+2	19	B-Liga qualification play-offs
4	BSF	10	5	1	4	19	18	+1	16	C-Liga play-offs
5	Fremad Valby	10	2	4	4	10	20	−10	10	C-Liga play-offs
6	Ølstykke	10	0	1	9	5	27	−22	1	C-Liga play-offs

Source: Danish Football Association
Rules for classification: 1) Points; 2) Goal difference; 3) Goals scored; 4) Head-to-head points; 5) Head-to-head goal difference; 6) Play-off (played on neutral ground if determining teams for different rounds); 7) Draw.

==== Results ====
Home \ Away	BSF	DAM	FRE	FVA	ODE	ØLS
BSF		0–6	1–2	0–0	1–3	1–0
Damsø	0–3		1–2	3–0	0–0	5–0
Fredensborg	2–1	0–3		2–2	2–3	1–0
Fremad Valby	1–3	2–2	1–0		1–6	0–0
OB Q II	4–6	1–5	1–2	3–1		7–1
Ølstykke	0–3	1–2	0–2	1–2	2–4	

Source: Danish Football Association (in Danish)
Legend: Blue = home team win; Yellow = draw; Red = away team win.

=== Play-offs ===
Pos	Team	Pld	W	D	L	GF	GA	GD	Pts	Qualification
1	BSF	0	0	0	0	0	0	0	0	2027–28 C-Liga
2	Damsø (Note: Reserve teams are not permitted to advance beyond C-Liga (tier 3) as they must remain two leagues below the main team, and are automatically relegated to non-league Denmark Series (tier 4) or below if the main team gets relegated from the A-Liga.)	0	0	0	0	0	0	0	0	2027–28 C-Liga
3	Fremad Valby	0	0	0	0	0	0	0	0	2027–28 C-Liga
4	OB Q II	0	0	0	0	0	0	0	0	2027–28 Denmark Series
5	Ølstykke	0	0	0	0	0	0	0	0	2027–28 Denmark Series

Updated to match(es) played on unknown. Source:
Rules for classification: 1) Points; 2) Goal difference; 3) Goals scored; 4) Head-to-head points; 5) Head-to-head goal difference; 6) Play-off (played on neutral ground if determining teams for different rounds); 7) Draw.

==== Results ====
Home \ Away	BSF	DAM	FVA	ODE	ØLS
BSF					
Damsø					
Fremad Valby					
OB Q II					
Ølstykke					

Updated to match(es) played on unknown. Source:
Legend: Blue = home team win; Yellow = draw; Red = away team win.

== Group 2 (West) ==
=== Regular season ===
Pos	Team	Pld	W	D	L	GF	GA	GD	Pts	Qualification
1	Silkeborg Q	10	6	2	2	21	7	+14	20	B-Liga qualification play-offs
2	VSK (Note: Reserve teams are not permitted to advance beyond this division (tier 3) and are automatically relegated to non-league Denmark Series (tier 4) or below if the main team gets relegated from the A-Liga.)	10	5	2	3	16	9	+7	17	C-Liga play-offs
3	Aalborg Freja	10	5	2	3	16	13	+3	17	C-Liga play-offs
4	Vejle	10	4	4	2	13	12	+1	16	C-Liga play-offs
5	Randers Q	10	2	3	5	14	20	−6	9	C-Liga play-offs
6	Brabrand	10	1	1	8	3	22	−19	4	C-Liga play-offs

Source: Danish Football Association (in Danish)
Rules for classification: 1) Points; 2) Goal difference; 3) Goals scored; 4) Head-to-head points; 5) Head-to-head goal difference; 6) Play-off (played on neutral ground if determining teams for different rounds); 7) Draw.

==== Results ====
Home \ Away	BRA	RAN	SIL	VEJ	VSK	AAL
Brabrand		0–5	0–3	1–2	0–2	1–2
Randers Q	0–0		0–0	1–2	1–0	3–4
Silkeborg Q	2–0	6–1		1–1	1–2	3–1
Vejle	3–0	2–0	0–3		1–1	1–1
VSK	3–0 (Note: Match was cancelled due to a venue conflict which was not resolved by DBU, and VSK was awarded a 3–0 victory.)	4–1	1–2	1–1		1–0
Aalborg Freja	0–1	2–2	1–0	3–0	2–1	

Source: Danish Football Association (in Danish)
Legend: Blue = home team win; Yellow = draw; Red = away team win.

=== Play-offs ===
Pos	Team	Pld	W	D	L	GF	GA	GD	Pts	Qualification
1	Brabrand	0	0	0	0	0	0	0	0	2027–28 C-Liga
2	Randers Q	0	0	0	0	0	0	0	0	2027–28 C-Liga

Updated to match(es) played on unknown. Source:
Rules for classification: 1) Points; 2) Goal difference; 3) Goals scored; 4) Head-to-head points; 5) Head-to-head goal difference; 6) Play-off (played on neutral ground if determining teams for different rounds); 7) Draw.

==== Results ====
Home \ Away	BRA	RAN
Brabrand		
Randers Q		

Updated to match(es) played on unknown. Source:
Legend: Blue = home team win; Yellow = draw; Red = away team win.

== Season statistics ==
As of 8 November 2026

=== Top scorers ===
Rank	Player	Club	Goals
1	(Denmark) Signe Lorentzen	OB Q II	9
2	(Denmark) Ditte Langberg	VSK	8
3	(Denmark) Amalie Blåsvær	OB Q II	6
4	(Denmark) Frederikke Boisen	Damsø	5
4	(Denmark) Amalie Erfurt	Silkeborg Q	5
4	(Denmark) Barbara Godvin	BSF	5
4	(Denmark) Mathilde-Sofie Stæremose	Silkeborg Q	5
4	(Denmark) Frida Svanholm	Randers Q	5
4	(Denmark) Signe Sønderup	BSF	5
4	(Denmark) Frederikke Troldborg	Damsø	5

==== Hat-tricks ====
Player	Club	Against	Result	Date	Round	Ref.
(Denmark) Amalie Erfurt	Silkeborg Q	Vejle B	0–3 (A)	8 November 2026	9	

=== Clean sheets ===
Rank	Player	Club	Clean sheets
1	(Denmark) Anette Fisker	Randers Q	4
1	(Denmark) Asta Riis	Silkeborg Q	4
3	(South Africa) Jessica Williams	Damsø	3
4	(Denmark) Ida Ankerstjerne	Fremad Valby	2
4	(Denmark) Vibeke Jensen	Vejle B	2
4	(Denmark) Maria Lenskjold	VSK	2
4	(Denmark) Lærke Rasmussen	BSF	2
8	9 players		1

=== Discipline ===
==== Player ====
- Most yellow cards: 3
  - (Denmark) Celia Bang (Silkeborg)
  - (Denmark) Fie Birk (Silkeborg)
  - (Denmark) Nanna Schouw (Fremad Valby)
- Most red cards: 1
  - (Denmark) Sofie Agergaard (Silkeborg)

==== Club ====
- Most yellow cards: 16
  - Silkeborg Q
- Fewest yellow cards: 2
  - Randers Q
  - Ølstykke
- Most red cards: 1
  - Silkeborg
- Fewest red cards: 0
  - 7 clubs

== See also ==
- 2026–27 A-Liga
- 2026–27 B-Liga
- 2026–27 Danish Women's Cup
