= 2025–26 C-Liga =

C-Liga
- Season: 2025–26
- Dates: 23 August 2025 – 13 June 2026
- Promoted: Sundby; Viborg FF
- Relegated: B73 Slagelse (G1); Svogerslev BK (G1); Dalum/Næsby (G2) (Note: JAI Fodbold was dissolved due to a lack of resources and withdrew from the league before the play-offs.)
- Matches: 84
- Goals: 294 (3.5 per match)
- Biggest home win: Viborg FF 7–0 JAI Fodbold (30 August 2025)
- Biggest away win: Brabrand IF 1–7 Viborg FF (8 November 2025)
- Only matches in the regular season are covered in the statistics

The 2025–26 C-Liga is the 5th season of the third-tier of the Danish Women's Football League. For the 2025–26 season onwards, the 2nd Division was renamed C-Liga.

Sundby BK and Viborg FF advanced to the B-Liga play-offs and both secured promotion to the 2026–27 B-Liga. Only three teams - B73 Slagelse, Dalum/Næsby, and Svogerslev BK - were relegated to the 2026–27 Denmark Series as JAI Aarhus was dissolved and withdrew from the league due to a lack of resources.

== Teams ==
=== Changes ===
ENTERING C-LIGA		EXITING C-LIGA	
▲ from 2024–25 Women's Series	▼ from 2024–25 1st Division	▲ to 2025–26 B-Liga	▼ to 2025–26 Women's Series
Svogerslev; Fremad Valby; Randers Q Silkeborg Q	–	Copenhagen	Ølstykke; Allerød FK; Kolding IF II

=== Stadiums and locations ===
Locations of the 2025–26 C-Liga teams.

Team	Location	Stadium	Capacity
B73 Slagelse	Slagelse	Stadium West Slagelse	1,000
BSF	Ballerup	Ballerup Stadium	4,000
Brabrand	Brabrand	Brabrand Stadium	1,000
Dalum/Næsby	Odense	Dalum Stadium	4,000
Fredensborg BI	Fredensborg	Fredensborg Stadium	2,000
Fremad Valby	Valby	Valby Idrætspark	2,000
JAI	Aarhus	JAI Sports Facility	
OB Q II	Odense	Marienlyst Centre	
Randers Q	Randers	Romalt Stadium	
Silkeborg Q	Silkeborg	Søholt Sports Facility	
Sundby BK	Copenhagen	Kløvermarken Sports Facilities	
Svogerslev	Svogerslev	Svogerslev Sports Facilities	500
Viborg FF	Viborg	Liseborgcentret	
Aalborg Freja	Aalborg	Gardian Park	

=== Personnel and kits ===
Team	Manager	Captain	Kit	Sponsor
B 73 Slagelse	(Denmark) Henrik Carlson	(Denmark)		
BSF	(Denmark) Uno Apold	(Denmark) Emilie Stolzenbach		
Brabrand IF	(Spain) Luis Lorente Carreras	(Denmark) Louise Bendtsen		
Dalum/Næsby	(Denmark) Michael Reifling	(Denmark)		
Fredensborg BI	(Denmark) Rasmus Skovby	(Denmark) Sofie Mikkelsen		
Fremad Valby	(Denmark) René Nielsen	(Denmark) Maja Albertsen		
JAI Fodbold	(Denmark) Brian Wind & Jan Christian Hansen	(Denmark) Marika Skov		
OB Q II	(Denmark) Jakob Jensen	(Denmark)		
Randers Q	(Denmark) Morten Løbe Hyldgaard	(Denmark) Fria Brix		
Silkeborg Q	(Denmark) Niklas Albech	(Denmark) Anna Bay Østergaard		
Sundby BK	(Denmark) Jan Kristensen	(Denmark) Trine Langhorn		
Svogerslev BK	(Denmark) Nikolaj Worch	(Denmark) Ditte Hellberg		
Viborg FF	(Denmark) Jakob Glerup	(Denmark) Frida Nørgaard	(United States) Capelli Sport	(Denmark) Peter Larsen Kaffe
Aalborg Freja	(Denmark) Rasmus Grejsen Lynge	(Denmark)		

=== Managerial changes ===
Team	Outgoing manager	Manner of departure	Date of vacancy	Pos.	Incoming manager	Date of appointment
Randers Q	Jesper Møgelvang	Sacked	28 April 2026	5th	Morten Løbe Hyldgaard	28 April 2026

== Group 1 (East) ==
=== Regular season ===
Pos	Team	Pld	W	D	L	GF	GA	GD	Pts	Qualification	SUN	BSF	ODE	FRE	SLA	FVA	SVO
1	Sundby BK	12	10	2	0	42	10	+32	32	B-Liga qualification play-offs		4–0	4–1	7–1	1–0	5–1	4–1
2	BSF	12	6	4	2	27	18	+9	22	C-Liga play-offs	2–2		2–3	1–1	4–0	2–2	4–1
3	OB Q II (Note: Reserve teams are not allowed to advance beyond the 2nd Division and are automatically relegated to the Women's Series if the main team gets relegated from the A-Liga.)	12	6	3	3	24	20	+4	21	C-Liga play-offs	0–3	2–2		5–2	2–2	3–1	2–0
4	Fredensborg	12	4	4	4	22	27	−5	16	C-Liga play-offs	1–1	1–3	2–2		2–1	1–0	5–1
5	B73 Slagelse	12	4	2	6	14	20	−6	14	C-Liga play-offs	2–3	1–3	1–0	2–2		2–0	2–1
6	Fremad Valby	12	3	1	8	12	25	−13	10	C-Liga play-offs	0–5	0–1	1–3	2–1	2–0		2–0
7	Svogerslev	12	1	0	11	10	31	−21	3	C-Liga play-offs	1–3	1–3	0–1	2–3	0–1	2–1	

Source: Danish Football Association
Legend: Blue = home team win; Yellow = draw; Red = away team win.
Rules for classification: 1) Points; 2) Goal difference; 3) Goals scored; 4) Away goals scored; 5) Play-off (played on neutral ground if determining teams for different rounds); 6) Draw.

=== Play-offs ===
Teams that placed 2nd to 6th in the regular season receive additional points from 1–5 corresponding to their results, ie. 2nd place receives 5 points, 3rd place receives 4 points etc. The 7th placed team is the sole team to receive no additional points going into the play-offs.

Pos	Team	Pld	W	D	L	GF	GA	GD	Pts	Qualification	BSF	ODE	FVA	FRE	SLA	SVO
1	BSF	10	6	2	2	26	11	+15	25	2026–27 C-Liga		7–1	0–1	4–2	2–0	2–2
2	OB Q II	10	7	0	3	26	18	+8	25	2026–27 C-Liga	3–2		1–2	2–1	6–1	2–1
3	Fremad Valby	10	6	1	3	13	10	+3	20	2026–27 C-Liga	0–2	1–0		0–0	1–4	1–0
4	Fredensborg	10	4	2	4	18	15	+3	17	2026–27 C-Liga	0–3	1–5	2–0		4–0	3–1
5	B73 Slagelse (R)	10	2	2	6	11	26	−15	10	2026–27 Women's Series	2–2	2–4	0–4	0–0		2–1
6	Svogerslev (R)	10	1	1	8	8	22	−14	4	2026–27 Women's Series	0–2	0–2	1–3	0–5	2–0	

Source: Danish Football Association
Legend: Blue = home team win; Yellow = draw; Red = away team win.
Rules for classification: 1) Points; 2) Goal difference; 3) Goals scored; 4) Away goals scored; 5) Play-off (played on neutral ground if determining teams for different rounds); 6) Draw.
(R) Relegated

== Group 2 (West) ==
=== Regular season ===
Pos	Team	Pld	W	D	L	GF	GA	GD	Pts	Qualification	VIB	RAN	SIL	AAL	DAN	JAI	BRA
1	Viborg FF	12	8	2	2	32	11	+21	26	B-Liga qualification play-offs		1–3	3–1	2–0	2–1	7–0	2–2
2	Randers Q	12	6	3	3	23	20	+3	21	C-Liga play-offs	2–0		0–0	2–2	2–1	2–1	2–1
3	Silkeborg Q	12	7	3	2	22	12	+10	24	C-Liga play-offs	0–3	3–0		2–0	4–1	1–1	2–1
4	Aalborg Freja	12	3	6	3	14	15	−1	15	C-Liga play-offs	1–1	2–0	0–0		2–1	1–1	2–2
5	Dalum/Næsby	12	3	1	8	18	24	−6	10	C-Liga play-offs	0–3	5–3	0–1	0–2		3–0	0–1
6	JAI	12	2	4	6	21	30	−9	10	C-Liga play-offs	0–1	3–3	0–0	3–1	3–5		1–1
7	Brabrand	12	1	5	6	13	31	−18	8	C-Liga play-offs	1–7	1–4	0–4	1–1	1–1	1–5	

Source: Danish Football Association
Legend: Blue = home team win; Yellow = draw; Red = away team win.
Rules for classification: 1) points; 2) goal difference; 3) number of goals scored

=== Play-offs ===
Teams that placed 2nd to 6th in the regular season receive additional points from 1–5 corresponding to their results, ie. 2nd place receives 5 points, 3rd place receives 4 points etc. The 7th placed team is the sole team to receive no additional points going into the play-offs.

Pos	Team	Pld	W	D	L	GF	GA	GD	Pts	Qualification	AAL	RAN	SIL	BRA	DAN	JAI
1	Aalborg Freja	10	8	0	2	22	6	+16	27	2026–27 C-Liga		5–0	0–1	1–3	4–1	3–0
2	Randers Q	10	6	0	4	16	14	+2	22	2026–27 C-Liga	0–1		1–3	3–1	2–1	3–0
3	Silkeborg Q	10	5	1	4	17	11	+6	21	2026–27 C-Liga	0–2	1–2		1–2	4–1	3–0
4	Brabrand	10	5	1	4	17	12	+5	16	2026–27 C-Liga	0–1	0–2	3–1		1–2	3–0
5	Dalum/Næsby (R)	10	4	2	4	15	14	+1	16	2026–27 Denmark Series	1–2	2–0	0–0	1–1		3–0
6	JAI (Note: Due to a lack of resources, the team dissolved and withdrew from the league before the play-offs.) (R)	10	0	0	10	0	30	−30	1	2026–27 Denmark Series	0–3	0–3	0–3	0–3	0–3	

Source: Danish Football Association
Legend: Blue = home team win; Yellow = draw; Red = away team win.
Rules for classification: 1) Points; 2) Goal difference; 3) Goals scored; 4) Away goals scored; 5) Play-off (played on neutral ground if determining teams for different rounds); 6) Draw.
(R) Relegated

== Awards ==
=== Player of the Autumn ===
Group 1
Player	Club	Ref.
(Denmark) Sissel Bøje	Sundby	

Group 2
Player	Club	Ref.
(Denmark) Asta Riis	Silkeborg Q	

== See also ==
- 2025–26 A-Liga
- 2025–26 B-Liga
- 2025–26 Danish Women's Cup
