= C-Liga =

Football league in Denmark

- Organising body: Danish FA (DBU)
- Founded: 2021; 5 years ago
- First season: 2021–22
- Country: Denmark
- Confederation: UEFA
- Divisions: 2 (2021–present)
- Number of clubs: 14 (Note: The number of participants in the third division were set at fourteen teams, but for the 2021–22 season the number was lowered to thirteen, with one team (reserve team of Fortuna Hjørring) missing in the west division. The number of relegation spots at the end of the season was lowered to three. Also, Kolding IF's reserves withdrew before the start of the 2024–25 season.) (2021–2026); 12 (2026–present)
- Level on pyramid: 3
- Promotion to: B-Liga
- Relegation to: Denmark Series
- Domestic cup: Danish Cup
- Website: www.c-liga.dk
- Current: 2026–27 C-Liga

C-Liga (formerly the Danish Women's 2nd Division) is an association football league in Denmark and the third division of the Danish football league system. Contested by 12 clubs, it operates on a system of promotion and relegation between the Danish Women's Football League second tier B-Liga and the non-league fourth tier Denmark Series. All participating clubs qualify for the first round of the Danish Cup.

== Format ==
At the conclusion of the regular fall season, the two group winners and four clubs from the second division qualify for the promotion play-offs in the spring season for four spots in the following season's B-Liga, while four teams are relegated following the relegation play-offs.

Between 2021 and 2023 the winners of each relegation play-off group participated in a final to determine the winner of the 2nd Division. The highest level for reserve squads is the third tier. From the 2025–26 season, the league tournament will be reduced to twelve teams.

== History ==
A nationwide third division of the Danish Women's Football League was effectuated at the November 2020 Danish Football Association (DBU) Board of Directors meeting, following a recommendation from the DBU women's elite committee, and exploratory work undertaken over the preceding years by Ligaforbundet. The aim of league expansion was to further the development of the standards of women's football in Denmark, specifically in the second division, in order to benefit the national football team. The inaugural format consisted of a west and east division geographically each with seven teams to be played in two stages; one qualifying stage in the autumn, with promotion and relegation play-offs held in the spring. Starting with the 2023/24 season, the playoff final ceased and was removed from the rulebook. With the addition of the third nationwide division in 2021–22 season, the highest level for reserve squads were downgraded from the second to the third tier, where an unlimited number of reserve squads would partake.

At the start of the 2023–24 season, Vildbjerg SF became the first club in the third tier of Danish women's football to be granted permission by the Danish FA to sign semi-professional contracts with their players. F.C. Copenhagen Women followed as the second team in the third tier to receive a license to sign player contracts, in the 2024–25 season. In their debut match of the 2024–25 season, on 17 August 2024 FC Copenhagen Women faced B.73 Slagelse at Vanløse Idrætspark in front of 5,165 spectators, setting a new record for the largest crowd attendance at a Danish women's club football game in the third tier. FC Copenhagen Women reached the semifinals of the 2024–25 cup tournament, making history as the first third-tier team to do so. In the semifinals, they faced top-flight club Fortuna Hjørring over two legs, drawing 1–1 in the first match.

On 20 July, a new visual identity, developed in collaboration with the design bureau Nord ID, was unveiled, with the rebranding including a new logo and renaming the third level league to C-Liga, removing any reference to women. From the 2026–27 season, the league tournament will be reduced from fourteen to twelve teams, competing in two geographical groups, while the number of teams in the top-flight league will be increased from eight to ten.

== Clubs ==
=== C-Liga seasons ===
31 clubs have played in the third tier of the Danish Women's Football League since its inception in 2021. Some teams might have merged to form the current clubs, the combined results of which will be displayed where noted. The teams in bold compete in the C-Liga currently, while the teams in italics are now defunct. Reserve teams are included in the list and marked as such (even if retroactively).

Incomplete

#	Club	Total	Latest
1	**Brabrand IF**	5	2027
1	**BSF**	5	2027
1	**Fredensborg BI**	5	2027
1	JAI Fodbold	5	2026
1	**Aalborg Freja**	5	2027
6	**FC Damsø**^{R}	4	2027
6	**Vejle B**	4	2027
8	Allerød FK	3	2025
8	B73 Slagelse	3	2026
8	Dalum/Næsby	3	2026
8	Kolding IF^{R}	3	2024
8	**OB Q II**^{R}	3	2027
8	Solrød FC	3	2024
8	Viborg FF	3	2026
8	**Ølstykke FC**	3	2027
16	**Fremad Valby**	2	2027
16	IF Lyseng^{R}	2	2023
16	Køge BK^{R}	2	2024
16	**Randers Q**	2	2027
16	**Silkeborg Q**	2	2027
16	Sundby	2	2026
16	Thisted FC^{R}	2	2024
23	ASA Fodbold	1	2023
23	Copenhagen	1	2025
23	Fremad Amager	1	2022
23	FC King George	1	2024
23	Svogerslev BK	1	2026
23	Midtjylland (Note: As Vildbjerg, the season before FCM took over the licence)	1	2024
23	**VSK Aarhus**^{R}	1	2027
23	Østerbro IF	1	2022
23	Aarhus 1900	1	2022

Key

^{R} indicates the reserve team for its parent A-Liga team.

== Winners ==
=== 2021–2023 ===
Season	Final Date	Winners (titles)	Result	Runners-up	Venue	Coached by	Ref.
DANISH 2ND DIVISION CHAMPIONSHIP FINALE (2021–2023)
2021–22	18 June 2022	Solrød (1)	w/o	Aalborg Freja	Solrød Idrætscenter, Solrød	(Denmark) Rasmus Skovby (Note: Rasmus Skovby resigned as head coach on 31 December 2022, and was replaced by on Jens Berglid 1 January 2022, who signed a two-year deal. However, Jesper Petersen was announced as the new head coach on 9 March 2022 following the termination of Berglid's contract.) (Sweden) Jens Berglid (Denmark) Jesper Petersen	
2022–23	16 June 2023	Solrød (2)	3–2	Brabrand IF	Brabrand IF's Idrætsanlæg, Brabrand	(Denmark) Jesper Petersen (Note: Jesper Petersen resigned effective immediately on 17 October 2022 with Jan Kristensen being assigned as the new head coach on 26 October 2022.) (Denmark) Jan Kristensen	

=== 2023–present ===
Season	Winners	Runners-up	Coached by	Ref.
DANISH 2ND DIVISION (2023–2025)
2023–24	Group 1			
2023–24	Dalum/Næsby	Damsø	(Denmark) Erling Thomsen	
2023–24	Group 2			
2023–24	Viborg	JAI Fodbold	(Denmark) Jakob Glerup	
2024–25	Group 1			
2024–25	Copenhagen	Sundby	(Denmark) Kasper Klarskov	
2024–25	Group 2			
2024–25	Aalborg Freja	Viborg	(Denmark) Claus Nygaard	
C-LIGA (2025–present)
2025–26	Group 1			
2025–26	Sundby	BSF	(Denmark) Jan Kristensen	
2025–26	Group 2			
2025–26	Viborg (Note: In April 2025, Team Viborg entered into a partnership agreement with Viborg FF, which meant that the women's 2nd division team played under the name Viborg FF while also using VFF's logo and jerseys during the 2025 spring season.)	Brabrand	(Denmark) Jakob Glerup	
2026–27	Group 1			
2026–27	Season in progress			
2026–27	Group 2			
2026–27	Season in progress			

== See also ==
- A-Liga
- B-Liga
- Danish Women's Cup
