= Aalborg Freja =

- Founded: 1972; 54 years ago
- Ground: Gardian Park
- Capacity: 1,000
- Chairman: Bettina Andersen
- Coach: David Rytter
- League: C-Liga
- 2025–26: C-Liga, 2nd of 6
- Website: https://www.aalborgfreja.dk/fodbold/kvindesenior/kvinder-c-liga/

Aalborg Freja is a Danish football club based in Aalborg, Denmark. The club plays in C-Liga, the third division of the Danish Women's Football League.

== History ==
Freja was established in 1972 and spent the first decades mostly in Series 1 (tier 6), before starting an ascend towards the late '90s from the Jutland Series (tier 5), over the Denmark Series (tier 4) and into the league in 2006. In the 2010s and 2020s Freja has vacillated between the B-Liga and the Denmark Series, before the third tier was introduced in 2021 where the team currently play. The club advanced to the 2024–25 Danish Cup quarter-finals as the only non-league team and played the match against Copenhagen with 1,804 spectators, losing in extra time. In 2026 the club secured its place in the 2026–27 C-Liga three rounds before the season concluded.

== Players ==
As of 18 October 2026

Note: Flags indicate national team as defined under FIFA eligibility rules; some limited exceptions apply. Players may hold more than one non-FIFA nationality.

No.	Pos.	Nation	Player
1	GK	DEN	Emilie Kappers
4	DF	DEN	Signe Damsgaard
5	MF	DEN	Louise Martens
6		DEN	Marie Petersen
7	FW	DEN	Mathilde Eriksen
8	MF	DEN	Ellen Frank Mitchell
9	FW	DEN	Frida Sørensen
10	MF	DEN	Marie Pedersen
11	DF	DEN	Stine Nørgaard

No.	Pos.	Nation	Player
12	FW	DEN	Emma Johansen
13	MF	DEN	Katrine Staffe
14		DEN	Benedicte Helena Erfjord
17	DF	DEN	Stine Maach
18		DEN	Cecilie Stefansen
—		DEN	Laura Alma Dorff Kristensen
—	GK	DEN	Meera Pedersen
—		DEN	Annika Lærke Janik
—		DEN	Rosa Elbæk

== Management ==
=== Coaching ===
Role	Staff
Head Coach	(Denmark) David Rytter
Assistant Coach	(Denmark) Sebastian Allentoft
Physiotherapist	(Denmark) Mads Winther Nielsen
Team Manager	(Denmark) Julie Madsen (Denmark) Trine Poulsen (Denmark) Lotte Haaning (Denmark) Sofie Haaning

=== Club ===
Role	Name
Chairman	(Denmark) Bettina Andersen

=== Managers ===
Years	Name
2026–	(Denmark) David Rytter
2025	(Denmark) Rasmus Grejsen Lynge
2023–2025	(Denmark) Claus Nygaard
	(Denmark) Peter Enevoldsen
	(Denmark) Peter Nielsen
	(Denmark) Jens Peter "Buller" Høyer
	(Denmark) Morten "Nalle" Routhe Johansen
	(Denmark) Ole "Granner" Jensen
	(Denmark) Erik Ørsted
	(Denmark) Carsten "Fidi" Mortensen
	(Denmark) Keld "Golonka" Nørgaard

== Seasons ==
As of the 2025–26 season

Football pyramid
Tier	Division
1	A-Liga
2	B-Liga
3	C-Liga
	NON-LEAGUE
4	Denmark Series
5	Regional Denmark Series
6	Series 1
7	Series 2

Key
(gold) Champions	Promotion
(silver) Silver	Relegation
(bronze) Bronze	

Incomplete

Season	Tier	#	W	D	L	F	A	Pts.	Cup
DIVISION WEST (2nd of 2) (Note: The league was originally divided into two groups of 10 teams, representing the east and the west of the country.)									—N/a
1975									—N/a
1976									—N/a
1977									—N/a
1978									—N/a
1979	7								—N/a
1980									—N/a
1981									—N/a
1982									—N/a
1983									—N/a
1984									—N/a
1985	7								—N/a
1986									—N/a
1987									—N/a
1988									—N/a
1989									—N/a
1990									—N/a
1991									—N/a
1992									—N/a
1993									
2004–05	4	5th of 6							2nd round
2005–06	4	2nd of 6							
2006–07	2	8th of 12	7	3	12	37	61	24	3rd round
2007–08	2	3rd of 10	10	4	4	51	30	34	4th round

Sources

- "Årsberetning 2007" (PDF). Dansk Boldspil-Union (in Danish). 2007.
- "Årsberetning 2008" (PDF). Dansk Boldspil-Union (in Danish). 2008.
