= Ballerup-Skovlunde Fodbold (women) =

Football club from Ballerup, Denmark

BSF
- Full name: Ballerup-Skovlunde Fodbold
- Short name: BSF
- Founded: June 1968; 58 years ago (Note: The year refers to Skovlunde IF's first women's team, which is now a part of BSF.)
- Ground: Ballerup Idrætspark, Ballerup
- Capacity: 4,000
- Chairman: Jakob Waag Villadsen
- Coach: Lars Sabroe & Steen Hansen (interim)
- League: C-Liga
- 2025–26: C-Liga, 1st of 6 (East)
- Website: https://bsfodbold.dk
Home colours

Ballerup-Skovlunde Fodbold (BSF) is a Danish football club based in Ballerup, who currently play in the C-Liga. The team play their matches at Ballerup Idrætspark which has a capacity of 4,000.

The club was formed in 2010 with the merger of the two neighbouring clubs Skovlunde IF and Ballerup IF into Ballerup-Skovlunde Fodbold (BSF).

== Squad ==
As of 7 August 2026

Note: Flags indicate national team as defined under FIFA eligibility rules; some limited exceptions apply. Players may hold more than one non-FIFA nationality.

No.	Pos.	Nation	Player
1	GK	DEN	Monica Jegindø (captain)
2	DF	DEN	Frida Belmadani
3	DF	DEN	Clara Rosendal Knörr Nielsen
4	DF	DEN	Alberte Harden
5	DF	DEN	Laura Løvenskjold Hansen
6	MF	DEN	Maja Dalby Hillmann
7	DF	DEN	Emma Foged
9	FW	DEN	Katja Larsen
10	MF	DEN	Emilie Stolzenbach
12	MF	DEN	Johanne Hauge Smith
13	DF	DEN	Raja Svendsen
14	FW	DEN	Lærke Larsen
15	DF	DEN	Freja Pedersen
16	MF	DEN	Barbara Godvin
17	FW	DEN	Mathilde Hemdorff
18	FW	DEN	Naya Madsen

No.	Pos.	Nation	Player
19	DF	DEN	Freja Hammer Mørch
20	MF	DEN	Freja Hjelmsø
22	GK	DEN	Lærke Rasmussen
23	MF	DEN	Katrine Ladegaard
24	DF	DEN	Thea Backe
25	FW	DEN	Sara Bursac
26	FW	DEN	Elvira Oline
—	GK	DEN	Ida Bæksted Stolzenbach
—	MF	DEN	Julia Hjørlunde
—	FW	DEN	Ditte Sønderup
—	FW	DEN	Signe Sønderup
—	MF	DEN	Julie Jessen Børner
—	GK	DEN	Alma Mørch
—	DF	DEN	Maja Sørensen
—	MF	DEN	Nikoline Andersen
—		DEN	Emilie Støchkel

== Management ==
As of 28 October 2026

=== Coaching staff ===
Role	Name
Head Coach	(Denmark) Lars Sabroe & Steen Hansen (interim)
Head of Performance	(Netherlands) Wieke Hoogzaad
Attacking Coach	(Denmark) Steen Hansen
Phyiotherapist	(Denmark) Elias Rafael

=== Club officials ===
Role	Name
Sporting Director	(Denmark) Gert Sørensen

=== Managers ===
Incomplete

Role	Name
2026–	(Denmark) Lars Sabroe & Steen Hansen (interim)
2024–2026	(Denmark) Uno Apold
2021–2022	(Denmark) Per Agerholm
2021	(Denmark) Thomas Frost (interim)
2021	(Denmark) Flemming 'Køge' Petersen
2020	(Denmark) Anja Heiner-Møller
2020	(Denmark) Kasper Klarskov
2019	(Denmark) Thomas Maale (interim)
2019	(Denmark) Peer Lisdorf
2017–2019	(Denmark) Thomas Maale
2015–2017	(Denmark) John Froman
2015	(Denmark) Thomas Maale (interim)
–2015	(Denmark) Jesper Stougaard

== Seasons ==
As of the 2025–26 season

Key
(gold) Champions	Promotion
(silver) Silver	Relegation
(bronze) Bronze	

Incomplete

Season	Tier	#	W	D	L	F	A	Pts.	Cup
2016–17	1	5th of 8	4	2	8	15	28	14	
2017–18	1	5th of 8	9	0	5	27	24	27	
2018–19	1	4th of 8	7	3	4	20	25	24	
2019–20	1	6th of 6	1	2	11	12	47	5	
2020–21	2	5th of 8 (Note: The league was divided into four groups of five (usually there were two groups of eight) and the season shortened to incorporate a new one-off play-off season to assist in the creation of the new third league tier, C-Liga. BSF were relegated to the new third tier under this one-off format.)	7	2	5	33	17	27	
2021–22	3	2nd of 6	8	2	2	23	9	26	
2022–23	3	4th of 6	11	0	1	34	8	33	
2023–24	2	6th of 6	4	2	8	17	26	14	
2024–25	3	2nd of 6	6	1	5	25	21	19	
2025–26	3	1st of 6	6	4	2	27	18	22	
2026–27	3								

Sources: Danish Football Association, Tipsbladet

== See also ==
- Ballerup-Skovlunde Fodbold (men's team)
