= Brabrand IF (women) =

- Full name: Brabrand Idrætsforening
- Short name: BIF
- Founded: 2020; 6 years ago
- Ground: Brabrand Stadium
- Capacity: 1,000
- Chairman: Harrie Horsmans
- Coach: Luis Lorente Carreras
- League: C-Liga
- 2025–26: C-Liga, 4th of 6 (West)
- Website: https://www.brabrand-fodbold.dk/holdsider/senior/kvinder-2-division-c-liga/

Brabrand Idrætsforening (commonly known as Brabrand IF or BIF) is a Danish football club based in Brabrand, Denmark. The club plays in the C-Liga, the third tier of the Danish Women's Football League.

== History ==
The club was founded in 2020 in an effort to build an identity as a team from the lower ranks and achieve promotion in due course in support of this concept. Brabrand did field a women's team in the '90s but the current team was moved to Brabrand in 2020. The club was promoted into the league in 2023, achieving consecutive promotions from its start in the Danish Series I. In 2024 Brabrand lodged an official complaint to Ligaforbundet stating the club is considering terminating its membership over the union's perceived favouring of the league clubs, particularly the top tier, A-Liga.

== Players ==
As of 4 October 2026

Note: Flags indicate national team as defined under FIFA eligibility rules; some limited exceptions apply. Players may hold more than one non-FIFA nationality.

No.	Pos.	Nation	Player
1	FW	DEN	Camilla Berg
2		DEN	Maike Coerschulte
3	FW	DEN	Rikke Hansen
4	MF	DEN	Rikke Søndergaard
5		DEN	Ane Jakobsen (captain)
6	MF	DEN	Sidse Østergaard
7	MF	DEN	Sarah Dahl
9		DEN	Julie Lange
10		DEN	Ida Nielsen
11	FW	DEN	Marika Skov
13	MF	DEN	Freja Vinther

No.	Pos.	Nation	Player
15	DF	DEN	Hannah Diesen
16		DEN	Matilde Bach
18	MF	DEN	Johanne Bloch
19		DEN	Martha Vaaben Dahl
20		DEN	Rebekka Klein
21		DEN	Signe Solsø
22	MF	DEN	Julie Nørgaard
26	MF	DEN	Stine Juul
30	MF	DEN	Sophie Feddersen
77	GK	DEN	Malou Christensen
—	MF	DEN	Emilie Løgsted

== Management ==
=== Coaching ===
As of 4 October 2026

Role	Staff
Head Coach	(Spain) Luis Lorente Carreras
Assistant Coach	(Denmark) Troels Nielsen
First Team Coach	(Denmark) Camilla Berg
First Team Coach	(Denmark) Ida Søndergaard
Goalkeeping Coach	(Denmark) Morten Overgaard
Physiotherapist	(Denmark) Mie Uggerhøj

== See also ==
- Brabrand IF (men's team)
