= Silkeborg Q =

- Short name: SIF Q
- Founded: 2017; 9 years ago
- Ground: Søholt Sports Facilities
- Capacity: 1,500
- Coach: Niklas Albech
- League: C-Liga
- 2025–26: C-Liga, 3rd of 6
- Website: Silkeborg Q

Silkeborg IF Q is a Danish football club based in Silkeborg, Denmark. The club plays in C-Liga, the third tier of the Danish Women's Football League. SIF Q started as a collaboration between several local clubs as AC Silkeborg in 2007 before consolidating into a club in 2013. In 2017 AC Silkeborg became part of Silkeborg IF and changed its name to Silkeborg IF Q. Silkeborg entered the league in 2025 with their promotion to C-Liga, and finished only two points short of entering the race for promotion to the second tier in their first season. The club has been sponsored by JYSK since 2022.

== Players ==
As of 16 September 2026

Note: Flags indicate national team as defined under FIFA eligibility rules; some limited exceptions apply. Players may hold more than one non-FIFA nationality.

No.	Pos.	Nation	Player
1	GK	DEN	Asta Riis
2		DEN	Marie Nielsen (captain)
3		DEN	Sille Gram
4	MF	DEN	Celia Bang
6	MF	DEN	Sofie Riis
7	MF	DEN	Fie Birk
8		DEN	Dea Knakkegaard
10		DEN	Mathilde-Sofie Stæremose
11		DEN	Amalie Erfurt
12		DEN	Ida Marchl
13		DEN	Sofie Agergaard

No.	Pos.	Nation	Player
14		DEN	Laura Guldager
15		DEN	Maja Nørby
16		DEN	Signe Erfurt
20		DEN	Anna Damgaard
21		DEN	Sofie Madsen
22	MF	DEN	Lotte Birk
23		DEN	Cecilie Stegger
24		DEN	Sofia Mammen
27	GK	DEN	Sara Halkier
29		DEN	Karoline Bonde

== Management ==
=== Coaching ===
Role	Name
Head Coach	(Denmark) Niklas Albech
Assistant Coach	(Denmark) Peder Thomsen
First Team Coach	(Denmark) Khoa Dang Nguyen
Team Manager	(Denmark) Lene Bang
