= Randers Q =

- Founded: 2023; 3 years ago
- Ground: Romalt Stadium
- Capacity: 1,000
- Chairman: Jacob Velling
- Coach: Morten Løbe Hyldgaard
- League: C-Liga
- 2025–26: C-Liga, 2nd of 6
- Website: Randers Q

Randers Q is a Danish football club based in Randers, Denmark. The club plays in C-Liga, the third tier of the Danish Women's Football League. They play their home matches at Romalt Stadium.

== History ==
Randers Q was founded in 2023 as a coalition between six local clubs - IF Alliancen, Randers Freja, Hornbæk SF, Helsted Fremad IF, Kristrup B and Romalt IF - to form a united team from the 7th largest city in Denmark. The project originated as a bid to unite the U13-U18 teams in Randers, upon which the senior squad was built. Randers took over the license from Romalt IF, then playing in the non-league fourth tier Denmark Series. The club achieved promotion to the league in 2025.

== Players ==
As of 6 September 2026

Note: Flags indicate national team as defined under FIFA eligibility rules; some limited exceptions apply. Players may hold more than one non-FIFA nationality.

No.	Pos.	Nation	Player
1	GK	DEN	Anette Fisker
2	DF	DEN	Dejlina Riis
3	DF	DEN	Naija Guthell
4	DF	DEN	Silke Sørensen
5	MF	DEN	Annabelle Lin
6	MF	DEN	Julie Christensen
7	DF	DEN	Rebecca Damgaard
8	FW	DEN	Frida Svanholm
9	FW	DEN	Mia Knudsen
10	MF	DEN	Fria Brix (captain)
11		DEN	Chloé Kamper

No.	Pos.	Nation	Player
12	MF	DEN	Julie Frederiksen
15		DEN	Emmeli Albers
17	MF	DEN	Asta-Marie Brandsøy
19	DF	DEN	Alberte Fjendbo
20	MF	DEN	Signe Duun
31		DEN	Trine Vendelbo
—		DEN	Lotus Amundsen
—		DEN	Julia Bollerup
—		DEN	Sophia Bollerup
—		DEN	Lærke Folkenberg

== Management ==
=== Coaching ===
Role	Name
Head Coach	(Denmark) Morten Løbe Hyldgaard
Assistant Coach	(Denmark) Line Jespersen
Goalkeeping Coach	(Denmark) Kim Wiegers Lade
Team Manager	(Denmark) Henrik Andersen
