= Ølstykke FC (women) =

- Short name: ØFC
- Founded: 1971; 55 years ago
- Ground: Ølstykke Stadium
- Capacity: 3,000 (400 seated)
- Coach: Morten Skoubo
- League: C-Liga
- 2025–26: Denmark Series, 2nd of 12 (promoted)
Home colours

Ølstykke Fodbold Club (commonly known as Ølstykke FC) is a Danish football club based in Ølstykke, Denmark. The club plays in the C-Liga, the third division of the Danish Women's Football League. Their home matches take place at Ølstykke Stadium.

== History ==
In the 2010s, Ølstykke was part of a collaboration with Stenløse Boldklub, following ØFC's promotion to the fifth tier in 2010. Ølstykke were promoted to the league for the first time in 2022, following back to back promotion from the non-league fifth tier to the third tier. Following promotion to the league, the club has interchanged the third tier with non-league every other year, their most recent promotion achieved in 2026.

== Players ==
As of 3 October 2026

Note: Flags indicate national team as defined under FIFA eligibility rules; some limited exceptions apply. Players may hold more than one non-FIFA nationality.

No.	Pos.	Nation	Player
1	GK	DEN	Iben Snedgaard
2		DEN	Emily Krause
3	FW	DEN	Heidi Viborg
4	MF	DEN	Freya Ihlenstadt
5	MF	DEN	Signe Rünitz
6	MF	DEN	Line Pointinger
7	MF	DEN	Lærke Haffner
9	MF	DEN	Jessica Pongkul (captain)
10	DF	DEN	Anna Nielsen
11	MF	DEN	Mie Brüel-Holler
12		DEN	Marie Petersen

No.	Pos.	Nation	Player
13	FW	DEN	Lisa Jønholt
14	DF	DEN	Carina Kjöller Vergmann
15	DF	DEN	Amber Hansen
16	FW	DEN	Fie Gravesen
17		DEN	Jamina El Fadil
18	FW	DEN	Linea Møller Madsen
19	MF	DEN	Cecilia Pokorny
—		DEN	Simone Frost Trab
—		DEN	Isabella Link
—		DEN	Cecilie Brendstrup

== See also ==
- Ølstykke FC (men's team)
