= Fremad Valby (women) =

- Full name: Boldklubben Fremad Valby
- Short name: BKFV
- Founded: 1985; 41 years ago
- Chairman: Steen Pedersen
- Coach: René Nielsen
- League: C-Liga
- 2025–26: C-Liga, 3rd of 6
- Website: https://www.fremadvalby.dk/fodbold/kvindesenior/kvindesenior-1
Home colours	Away colours

Boldklubben Fremad Valby (commonly known as Fremad Valby) is a Danish football club based in Valby, Denmark. The club plays in the C-Liga, the third division of the Danish Women's Football League. Since 2024 the team has been sponsored by FB Gruppen.

== History ==
Fremad Valby was established in 1988 and the club has spent most of its existence in the non-league divisions, with a few spells of two years without fielding an 11-a-side team. In the 2020s the club started moving up the ranks, and were promoted in 2025, entering the league for the first time in the 2025–26 season. The club's aim is to maintain its presence in the league.

== Players ==
As of 15 October 2026

Note: Flags indicate national team as defined under FIFA eligibility rules; some limited exceptions apply. Players may hold more than one non-FIFA nationality.

No.	Pos.	Nation	Player
1	GK	DEN	Ida Ankerstjerne
2		DEN	Christine Kelm
4		DEN	Mathilde Nielsen
5		DEN	Luna Bengtsson
7		DEN	Sara Birch
8		DEN	Freja Hansen
9		DEN	Nanna Schouw
10		DEN	Cæcilie Rosendahl
11		DEN	Melanie Wintherfeldt
12		DEN	Nicoline Skolnik
13		DEN	Isabella Weibel
14	MF	DEN	Rosa da Cunha

No.	Pos.	Nation	Player
15		DEN	Clara Prebensen
16		DEN	Maja Albertsen
17	MF	DEN	Astrid Havmand
18	DF	DEN	Victoria Nordbeck
20		DEN	Ida Ditlevsen
22	MF	DEN	Sofie Andersen
25		DEN	Naja Højlund
—		DEN	Karla Nystrøm
—		DEN	Sofie Ribeiro Betzer
—		DEN	Emma Christiansen
—		DEN	Juliane P

== Management ==
=== Coaching ===
As of October 2026

Position	Staff
Head Coach	(Denmark) René Nielsen
Assistant Coach	(Denmark) Thomas Pedersen
First Team Coach	(Denmark) Rabie Bachnak
Goalkeeping Coach	(Denmark) Michael Keil Truesen
Fitness Coach	(Denmark) Martin Børgesen
Team Manager	(Denmark) Gry Skovsted (Denmark) Lasse Kaus
Physiotherapist	(Denmark) Michael Nielsen

=== Club ===
As of October 2026

Position	Staff
Chairman	(Denmark) Steen Pedersen
Sporting Director	(Denmark) Danni Kikkenborg

== Seasons ==
As of the 2025–26 season

Key
(gold) Champions	Promotion
(silver) Silver	Relegation
(bronze) Bronze	

Incomplete

Season	Tier	#	W	D	L	F	A	Pts.	Cup
1988	7 (Note: At the time, this was tier 5; today tier 7 as the 2nd and 3rd divisions were introduced in 1993 and 2021, respectively.)								—N/a
1989									—N/a
1990									—N/a
1991									—N/a
1992									—N/a
1993									
1994									
1995									
1996									
1996–97									
1997–98									
1998–99									
