= Brabrand =

- Postal district
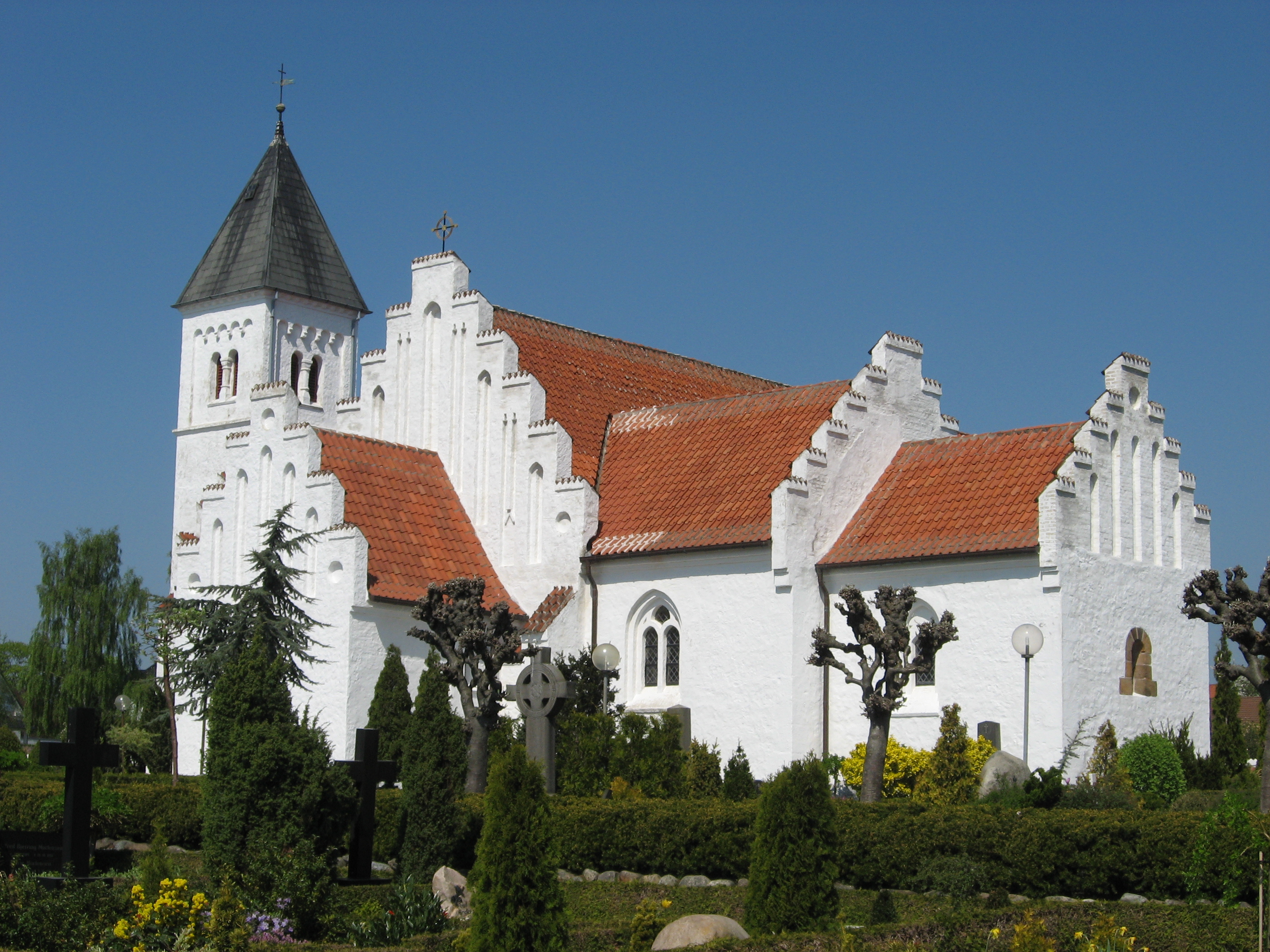
- Brabrand Church

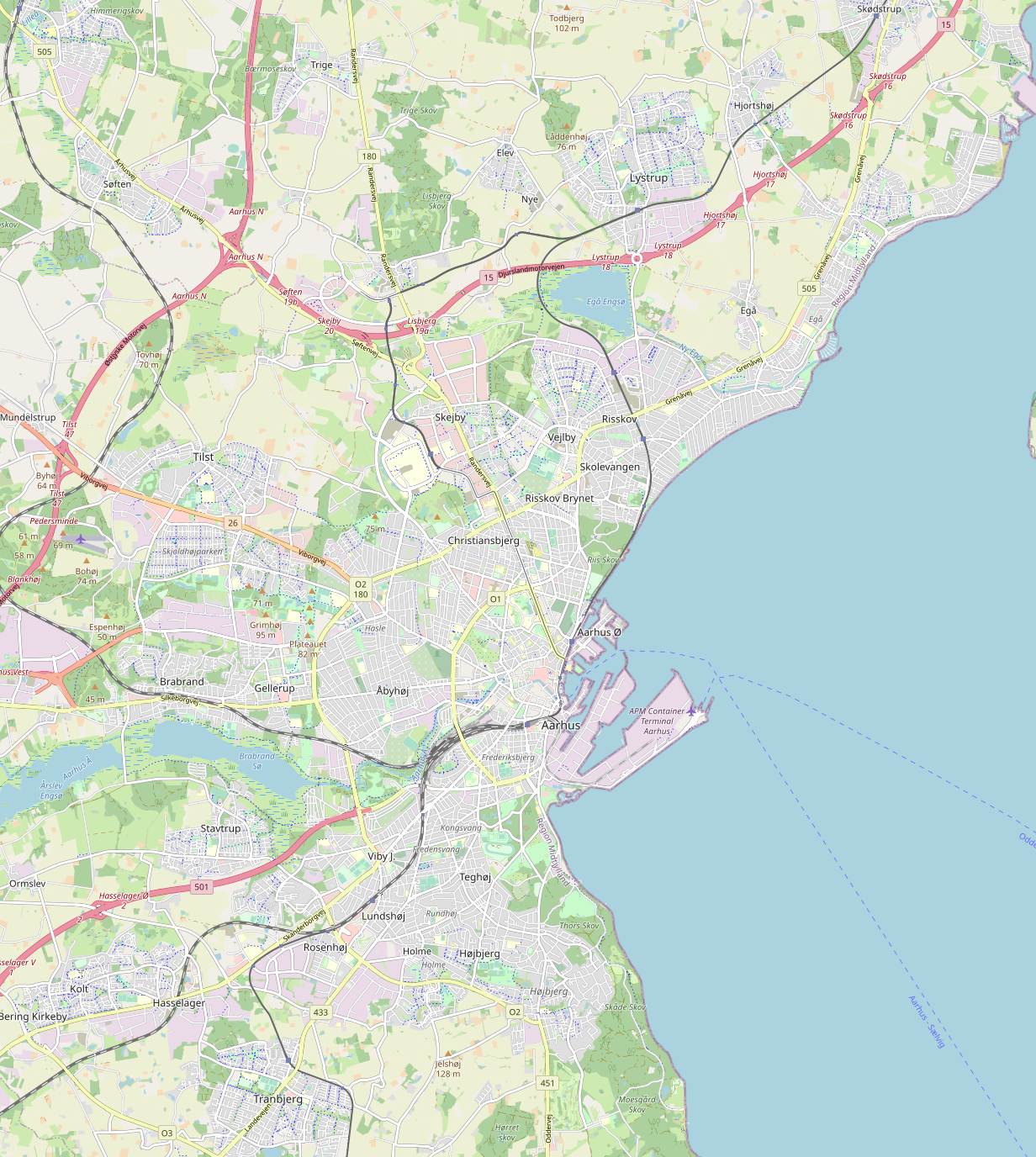
- Location within Aarhus
- Coordinates: 56.159540°N 10.100206°E
- Country: Kingdom of Denmark
- Regions of Denmark: Central Denmark Region
- Municipality: Aarhus Municipality
- Postal code: 8220

Brabrand (Danish pronunciation: [ˈpʁɑːˌpʁɑnˀ]) is a postal district of Aarhus Municipality, Denmark. South of Brabrand, in the Aarhus river-valley, is the largest recreational area of Aarhus Municipality, comprising the Brabrand Lake and the meadow-lake of Årslev, with surrounding natural sites.

== History ==
Brabrand was originally a village 6–9 km west of Aarhus, founded in the 18th century, by clearing the land by forest burning (the Danish name reflects this), and its economy was initially based on farming and associated trades. The village became a suburb of Aarhus in 1970 and has now merged with the city.

== Description ==
The district of Brabrand is located outside the ring road of Ring 2 and comprise four distinct areas: The old town in the south by the lake, mainly made up of single-family houses. A modern housing area in the west, with a mix of single-family houses and low multi-family houses. An industrial park around the road of Edwin Rahrs Vej in the north, and finally the modernist suburban residential area of Gellerup in the east.

The more affluent western part of Brabrand was expanded recently in 2005, with the new residential area of Helenelyst further west. Helenelyst is a mix of modern one-family houses, two-family houses, and 3 story houses, built to accommodate slightly richer middle-class families.

The neighbourhood of Gellerup stands out as an architectural example of the former urban development style, built around several Danish cities in the 1960s. Gellerup is known as a multinational district, where the Middle East is highly represented, also exemplified in the big middle-eastern inspired shopping mall of Bazar Vest. In the southeast of Gellerup, next to the busy Silkeborg Highway, is the shopping mall of City Vest, one of the largest in Denmark.

Along with the retail and service sectors, a number of multi-national companies have a presence in Brabrand.

== Attractions ==
Brabrand is home to several natural and recreational sites, attracting citizens from all over Aarhus. This includes the Brabrand Lake and the Årslev meadow-lake in the south, connected with the city centre of Aarhus by the pathway of Brabrandstien; the newly raised woodland of Gellerup Skov in the southeast; Skjoldhøjkilen in the north; the valley of Langdalen in the west and the forests of Årslev Skov and True Skov also in the west.

Brabrand has several important sports facilities, such as the rowing stadium at the Brabrand Lake, the new sports and community centre of Globus1 at Gellerup, opportunities for mountainbiking, green exercise and motocross in Skjoldhøjkilen, in addition to many small-scale regular sports facilities like tennis courts, soccer fields, a swimminghall, boxing and martial arts clubs, etc..

Brabrand houses one of the few remaining dolmens in the greater Aarhus area. Most of the dolmens in Aarhus, have been demolished long time ago, but what is left is now regarded as special relics of the past to be protected and valued in the landscape, wherever they might be located. The dolmen is called Årslev Dyssen (lit.: The Årslev Dolmen) and is dated to have been constructed in the Stone Age, when the first agricultural societies emerged in Scandinavia around 6,000 years ago. Until 1822, there was a stone-coffin across the road of this dolmen, but it was demolished after a somewhat "scientific" excavation, led by Colonel Høegh Guldberg. 700 m to the east of The Årslev Dolmen, there was another dolmen. It was removed for an unknown reason at some point in the 1880s. The history surrounding Årslev Dyssen might be more impressive than its looks. The dolmen grounds are privately owned by the auto company next to it, but publicly accessible.

== Gallery ==
Nature and green spaces

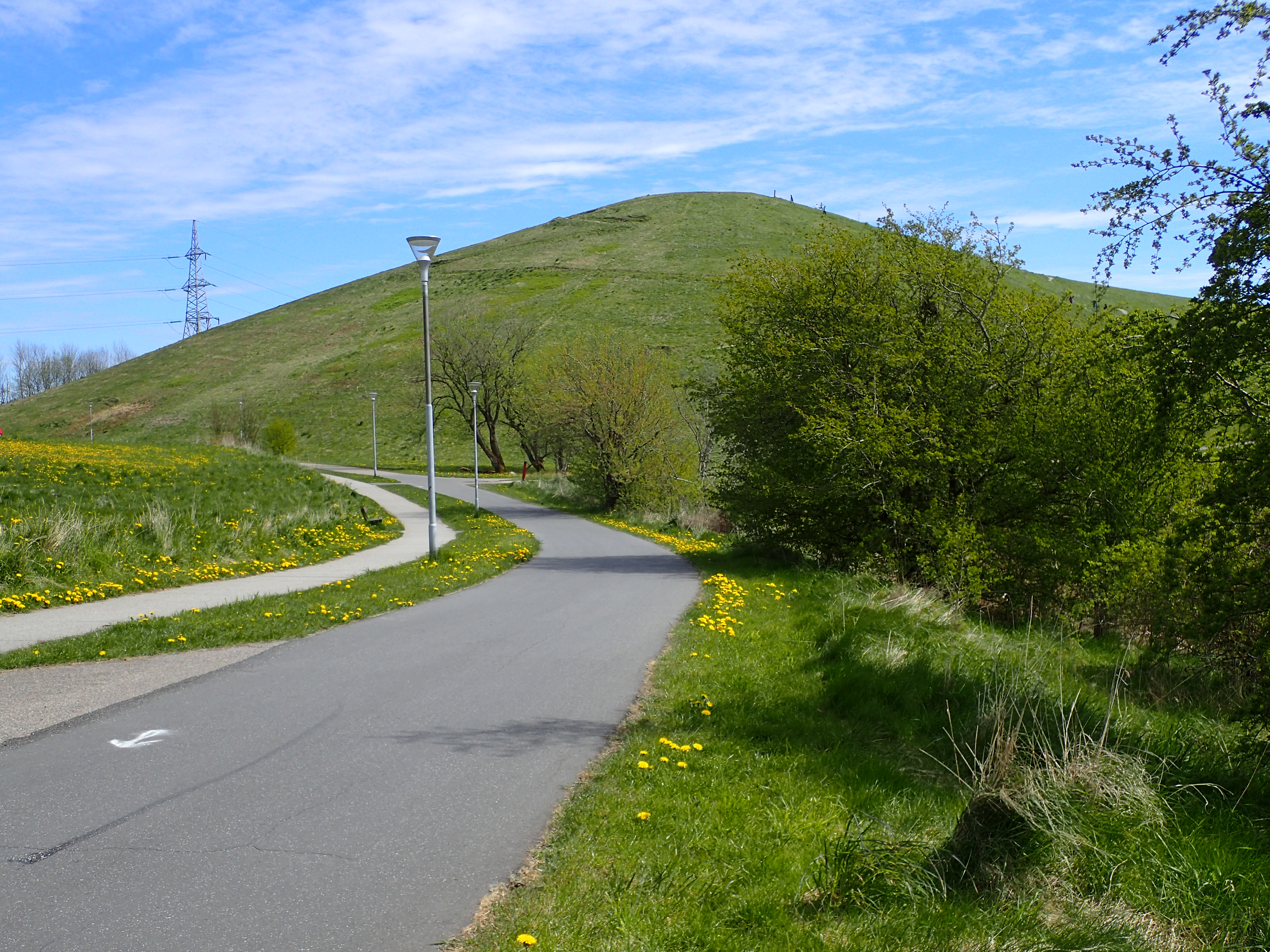
Hasle Bakker

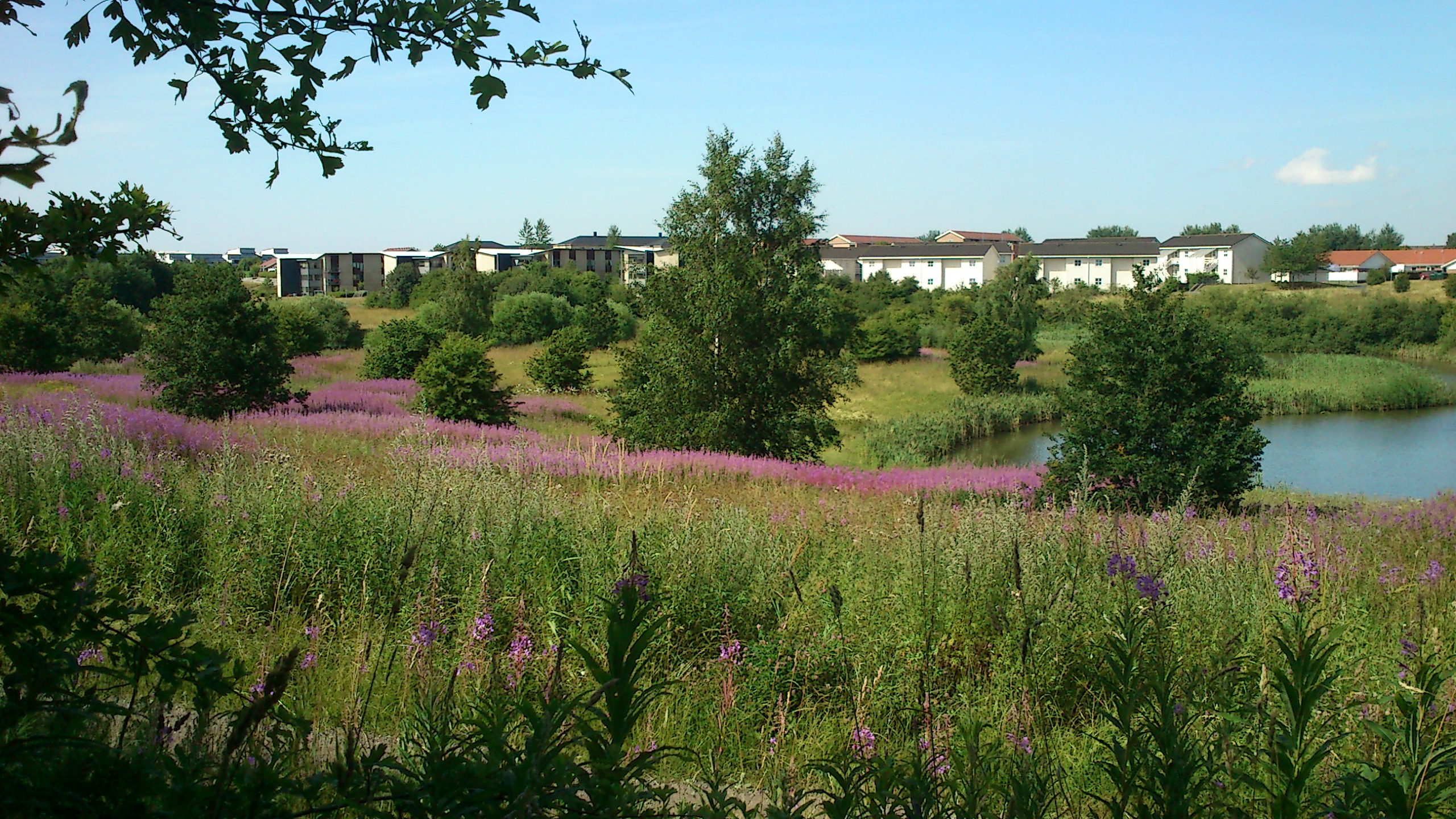
Skjoldhøjkilen

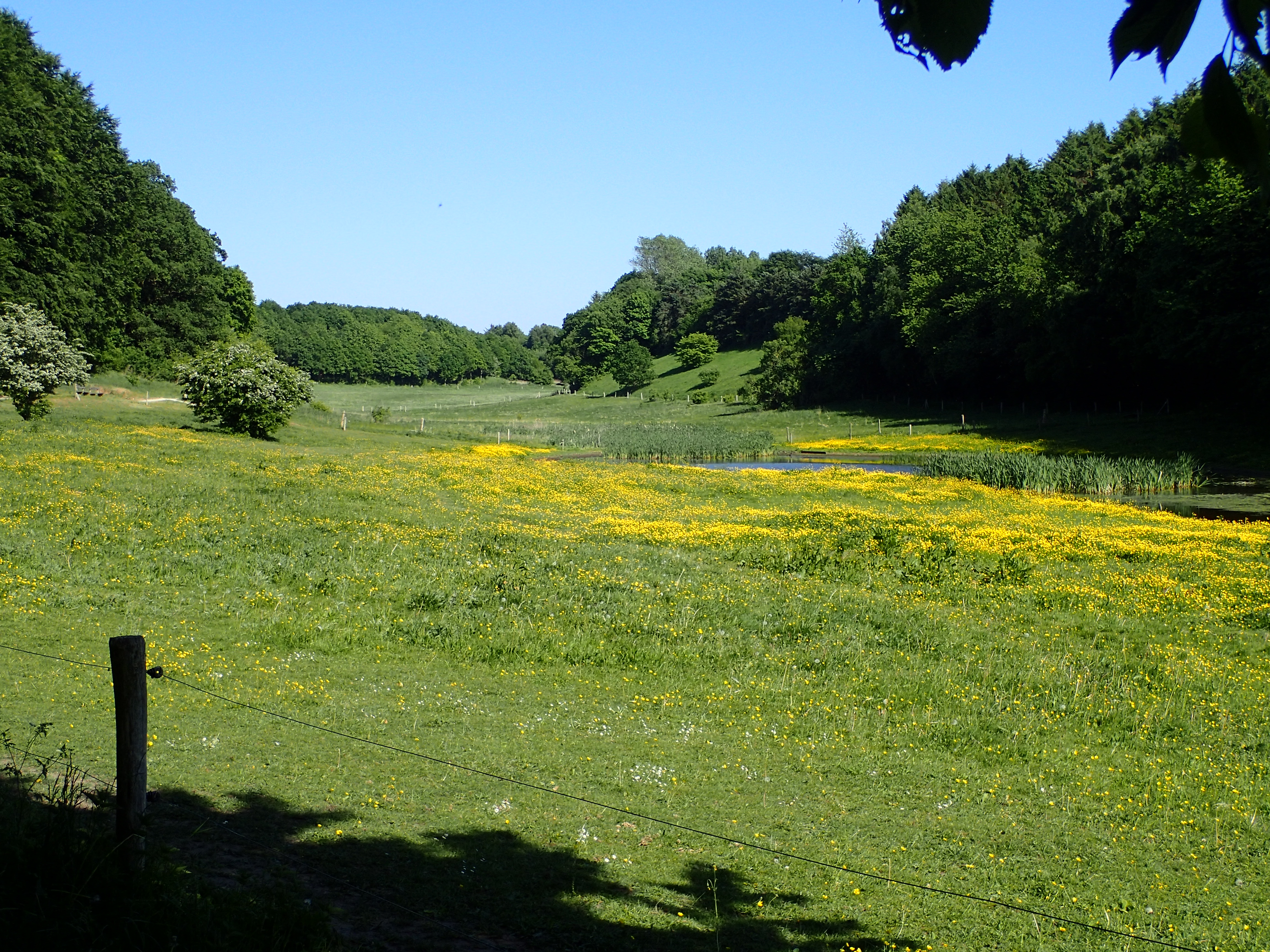
Langdalen

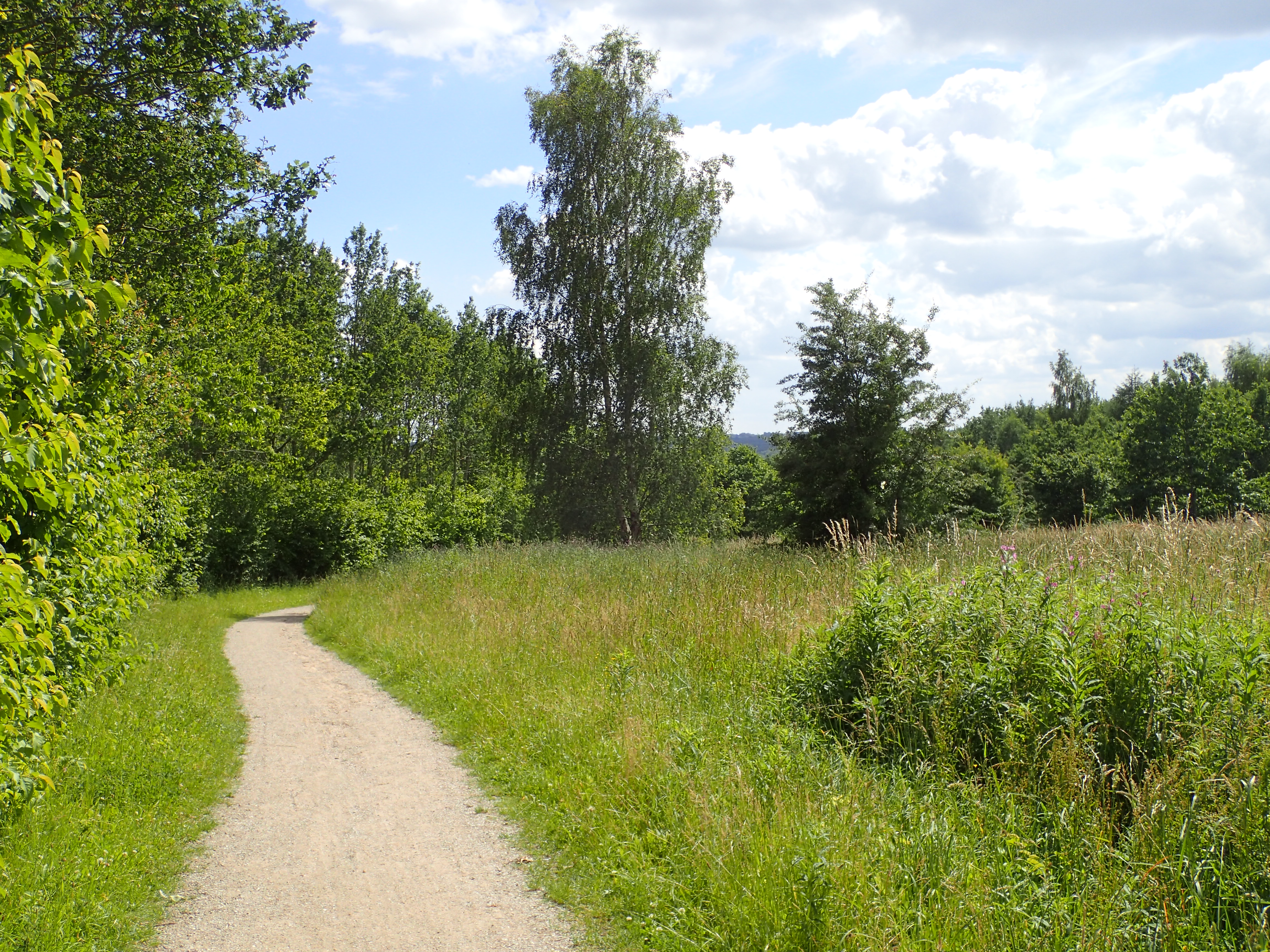
Gellerup Skov.

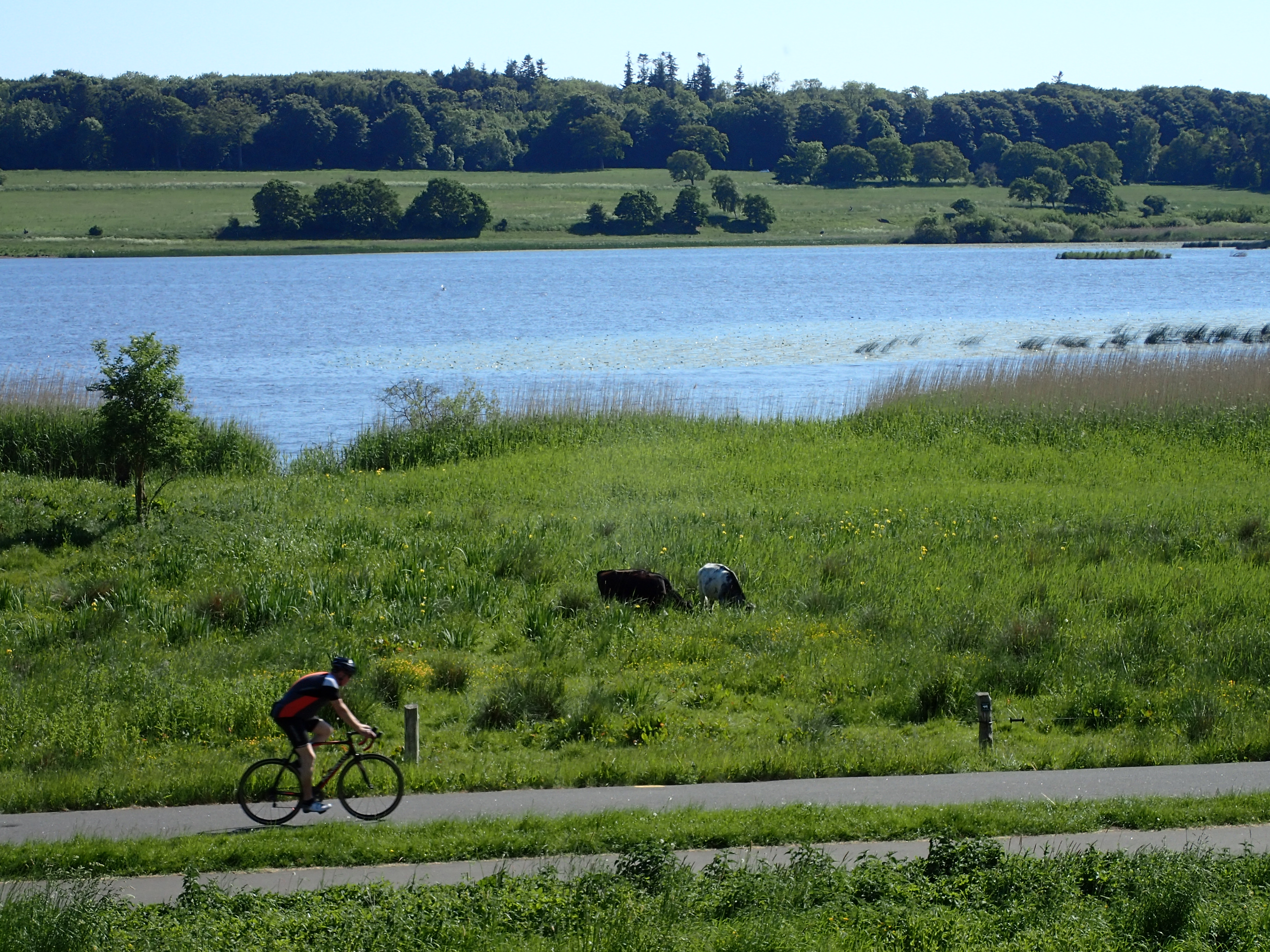
Brabrand Lake.

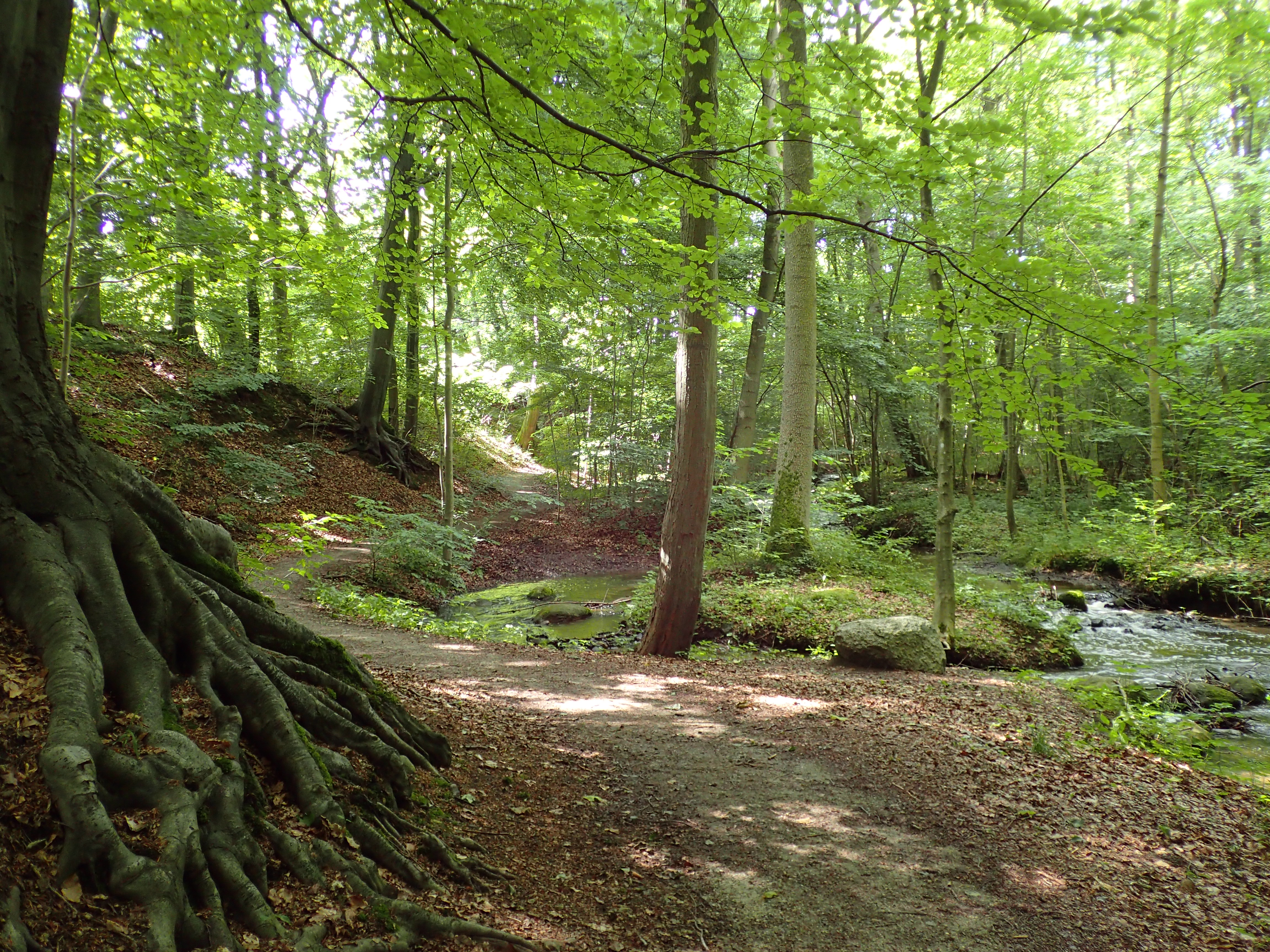
Årslev Forest

Culture and structures

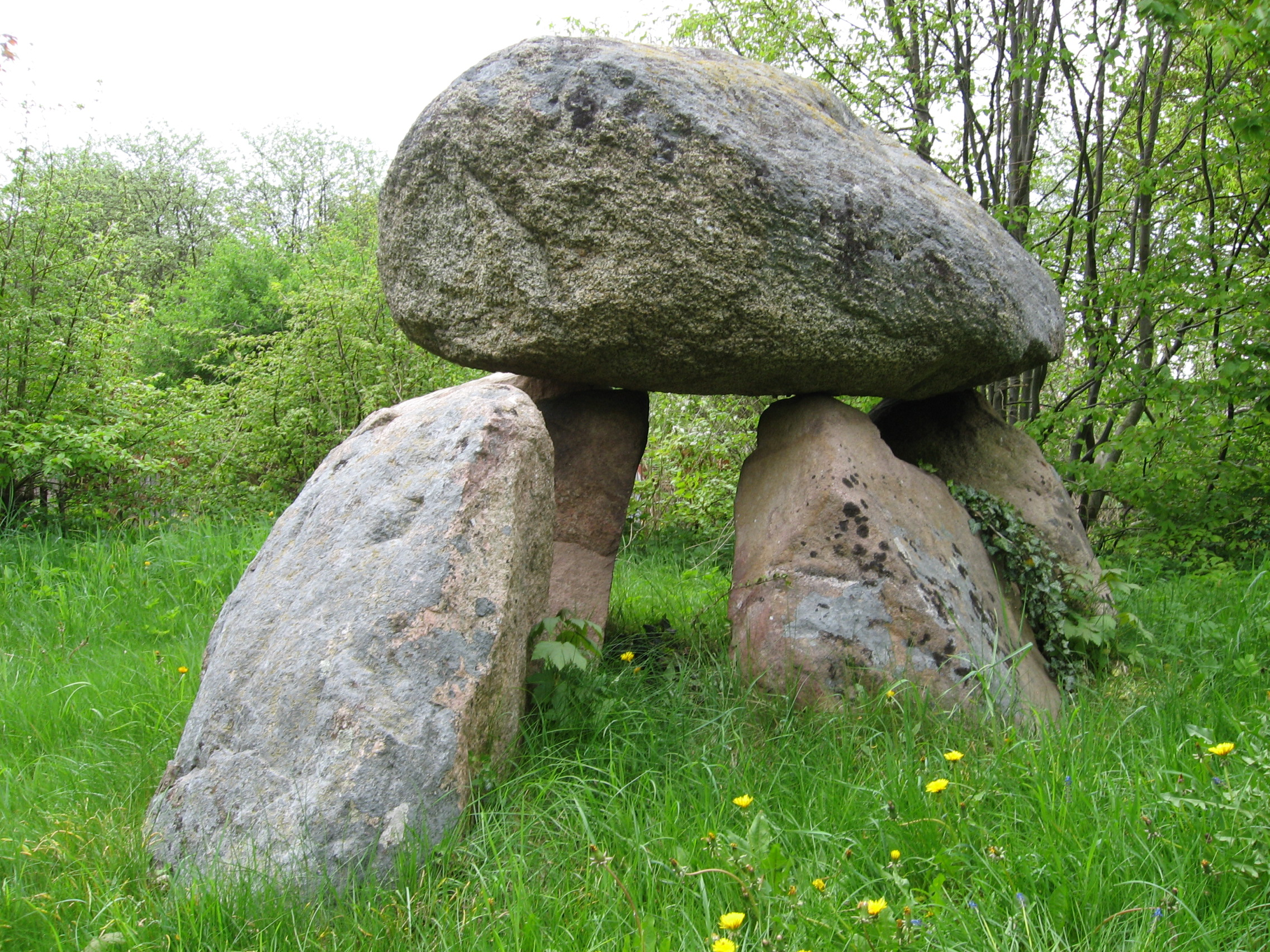
Årslev Dyssen

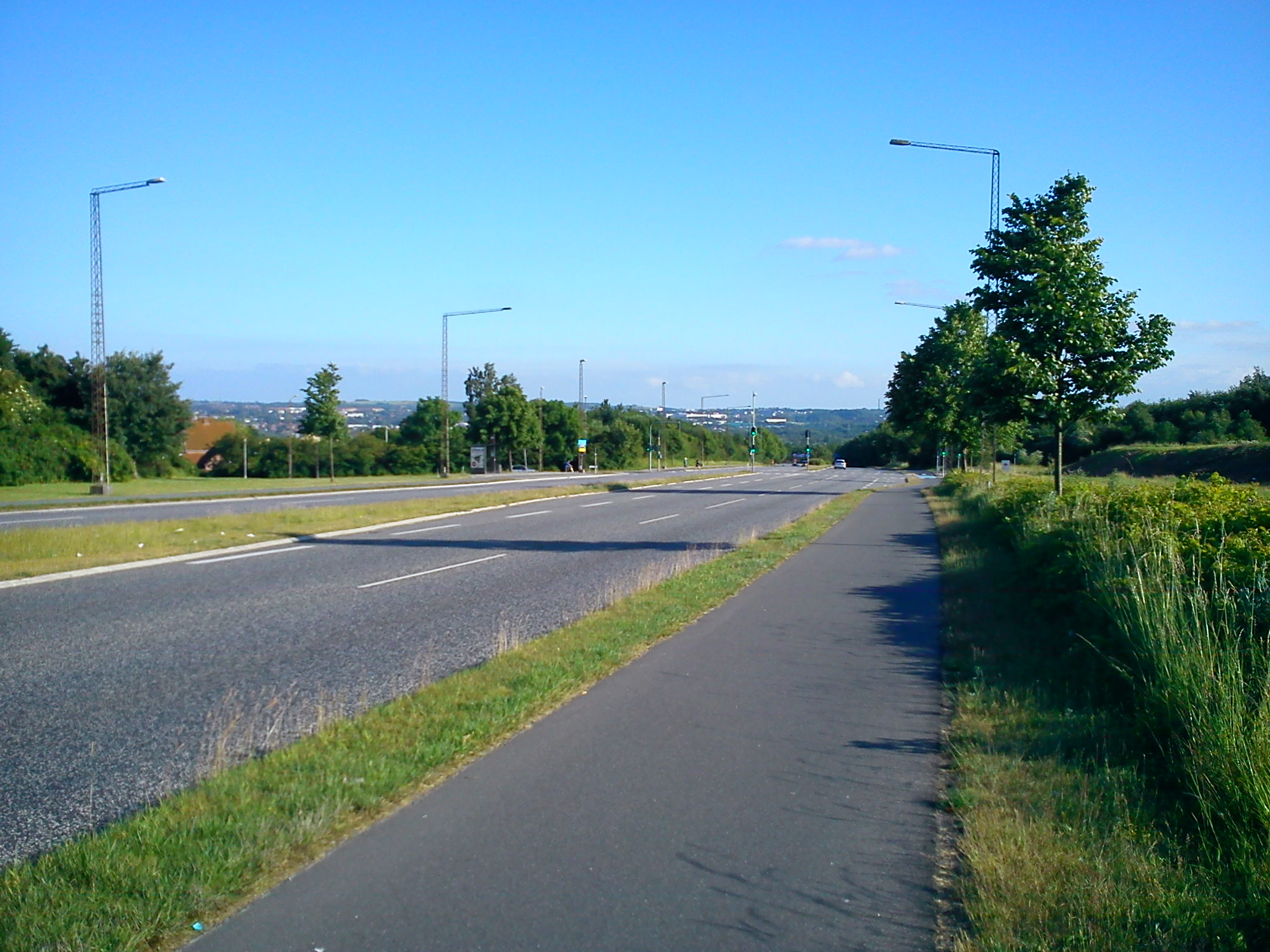
Ring 2 ring road, separates Brabrand from Aarhus V

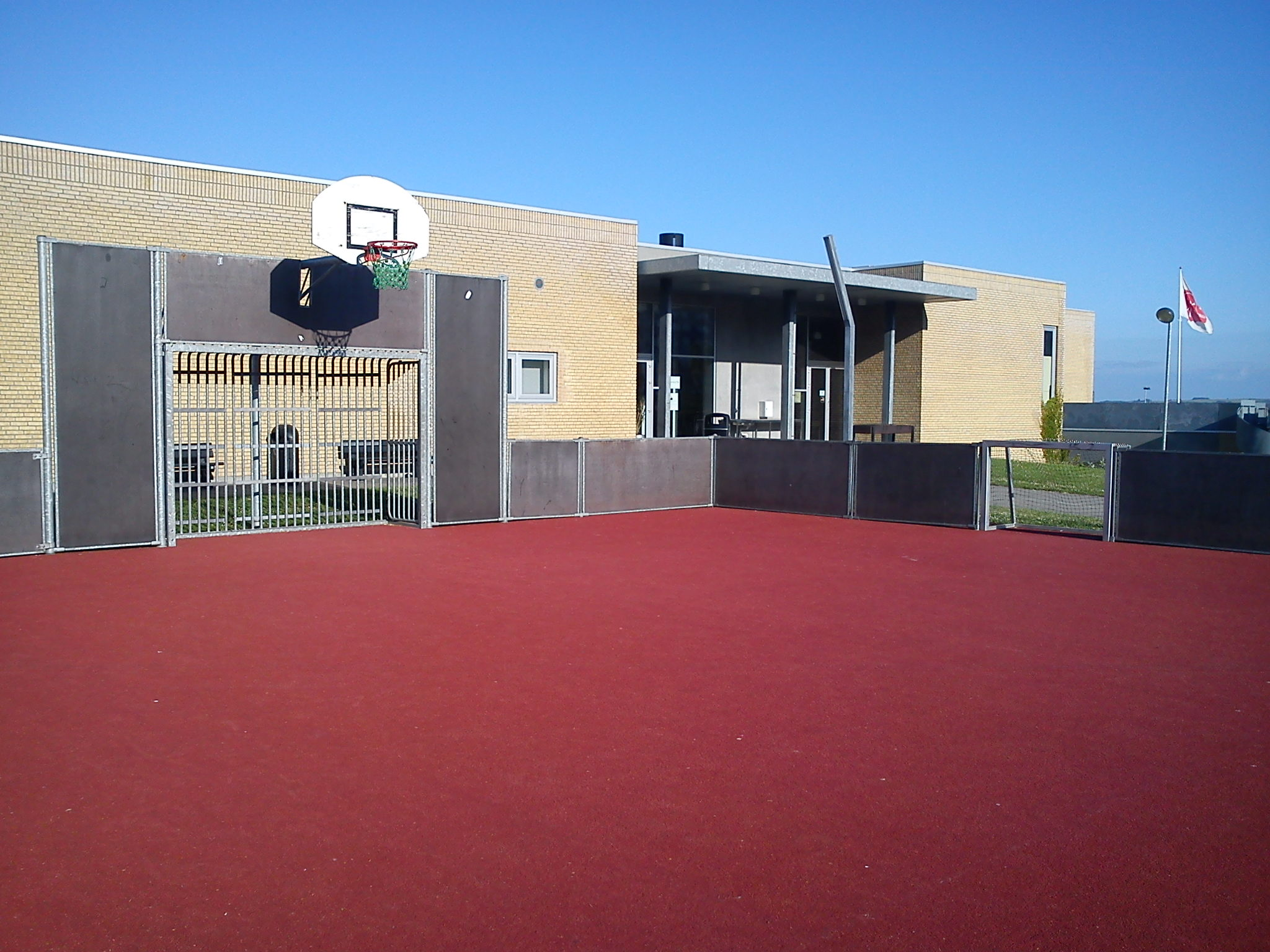
Globus1, sports and cultural center.

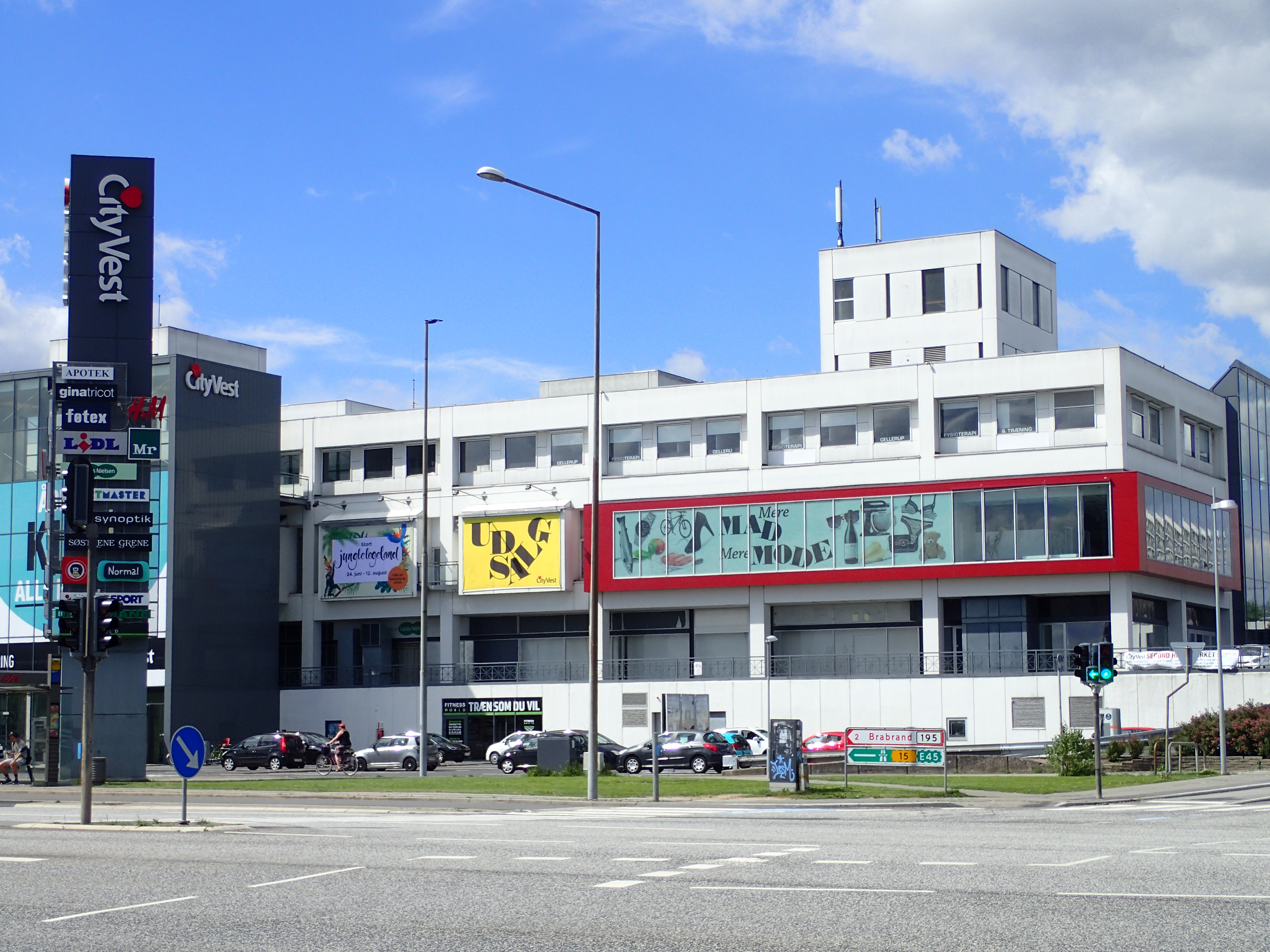
City Vest shopping center.

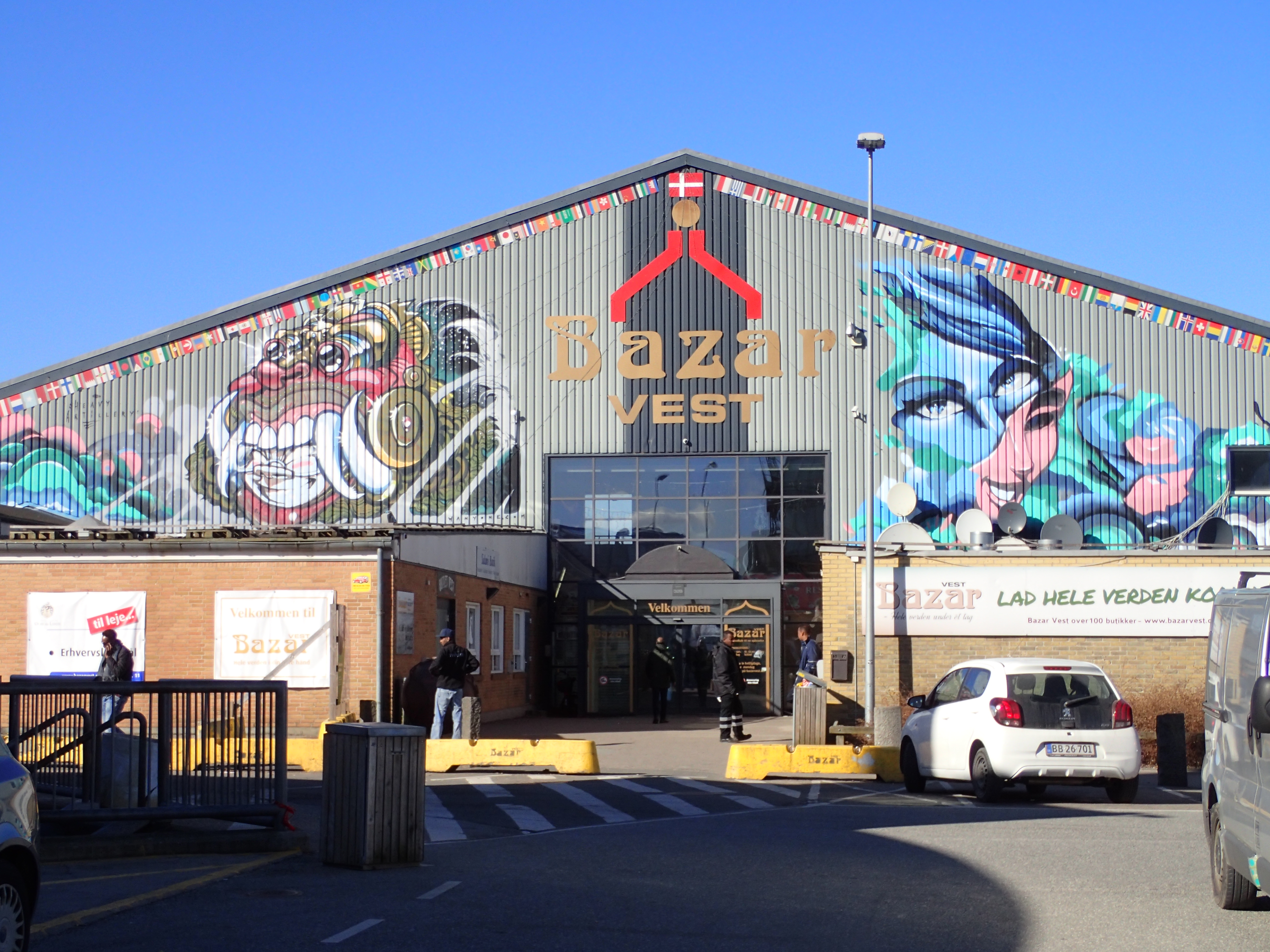
Bazar Vest, ethnically diverse bazar.

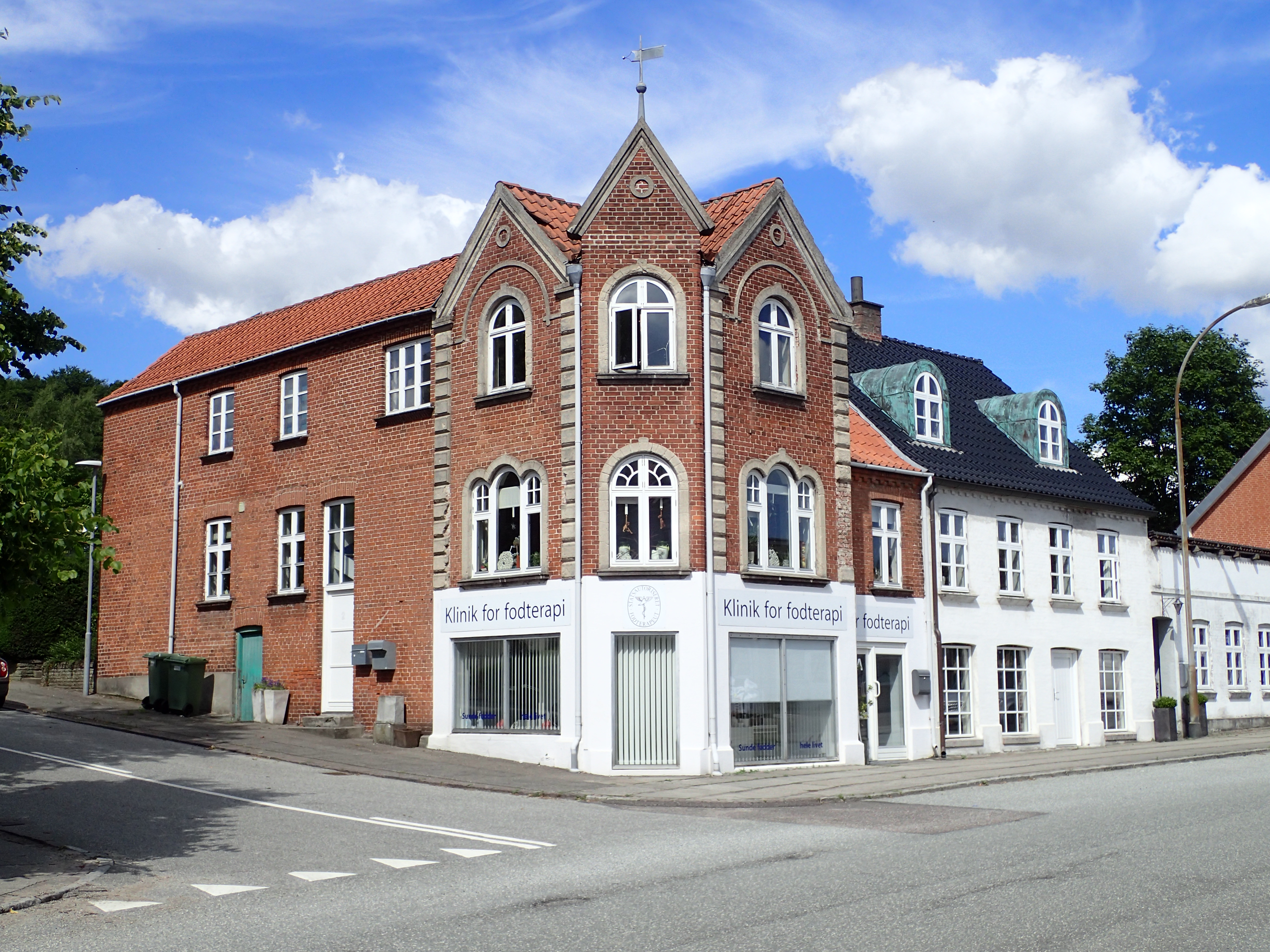
Gammel Brabrand, the old lakeside village

== See also ==
Other postal districts of Aarhus includes:

- Viby J
- Højbjerg
- Aarhus V
- Arhus N
- Aarhus C
