= Pedersen =

Pedersen (Danish pronunciation: [ˈpʰe̝(ː)ðɐsn̩]) is a Danish and Norwegian patronymic surname, literally meaning "son of Peder". It is the fifth most common surname in Denmark, shared by about 3.4% of the population, and the sixth most common in Norway. It is of similar origin as the surname Petersen.

People with the surname include:

== A ==
- Aaron Pedersen (born 1970), Australian actor
- Abdul Wahid Pedersen (born 1954), Danish imam
- Alexander Pedersen (1891–1955), Norwegian sprinter
- Alex Pedersen (cyclist) (born 1966), Danish cyclist
- Alf Pedersen (1904–1925), Norwegian boxer
- Allen Pedersen (born 1965), Canadian retired ice hockey player
- Alma Pedersen (born 2005), Danish rhythmic gymnast
- Anne Rygh Pedersen (born 1967), Norwegian politician

== B ==
- Bente Pedersen (born 1961), Norwegian novelist
- Bent-Ove Pedersen (born 1967), Norwegian tennis player
- Bernard E. Pedersen, American politician
- Bjarne Pedersen (born 1978), Danish speedway rider
- Bjarne Pedersen (rower) (born 1944), Danish rower
- Bjarne Bent Rønne Pedersen (1935–1993), Danish musician, banjo player and singer
- Blaine Pedersen, Canadian politician in Manitoba

== C ==
- Carl Alfred Pedersen (1882–1960), Norwegian gymnast and triple jumper
- Carl Pedersen (gymnast) (1883–1971), Danish gymnast
- Carl Pedersen (rower) (1884–1968), Danish rower
- Carl-Henning Pedersen (1913–2007), Danish painter
- Carsten Pedersen (born 1977), Danish cricketer
- Cato Zahl Pedersen (born 1959), Norwegian skier
- Charles J. Pedersen (1904–1989), American organic chemist
- Chris Pedersen (actor), American actor and film star
- Chris Pedersen (musician), Australian drummer
- Christian Pedersen (1889–1953), Danish gymnast who competed in the 1920 Summer Olympics
- Christiern Pedersen (1480–1554), Danish canon, humanist scholar, writer, printer and publisher
- Christina Pedersen (handballer) (born 1982), Danish team handball goalkeeper
- Christina Pedersen (referee) (born 1981), Norwegian football referee
- Christopher S. Pedersen (born 1986), Norwegian baritone

== D ==
- Dag Erik Pedersen (born 1959), Norwegian road racing cyclist
- Dan Pedersen, US Navy captain considered the driving force behind the creation of the Fighter Tactics Instructor program (Topgun)
- David Pedersen (born 1986), Norwegian singer
- Dwite Pedersen (1941–2021), American politician
- Dynes Pedersen (1893–1960), Danish gymnast

== E ==
- Eigil Pedersen (1917–1994), Danish chess player
- Elaine Pedersen (1936–2000), American long-distance runner
- Ellen Birgitte Pedersen (born 1955), Norwegian politician
- Erik Bue Pedersen (born 1952), Danish handball player
- Erik Pedersen (born 1967), Norwegian footballer

== F ==
- Finn Pedersen (1925–2012), Danish rower

== G ==
- George Pedersen (academic administrator) (born 1931), Canadian academic administrator
- Gerhard Pedersen (1912–1987), Danish boxer
- Gitte Pedersen (born 1979), Danish football player
- Gro Pedersen Claussen (born 1941) Norwegian graphic designer
- Gunner Møller Pedersen (born 1943), Danish composer

== H ==
- Haakon Pedersen (1906–1991), Norwegian speed skater
- Hallgeir Pedersen (born 1973), Norwegian jazz guitarist
- Hans Eiler Pedersen (1890–1971), Danish gymnast
- Hans Pedersen (1887–1943), Danish gymnast
- Helga Pedersen (Denmark) (1911–1980), Danish Chief Justice and politician
- Helga Pedersen (Norway) (born 1973), Norwegian deputy leader for the Labour Party
- Helmer Pedersen (1930–1987), New Zealand Olympic Gold medallist in yachting
- Henrik Bolberg Pedersen (born 1960), Danish trumpeter and flugelhorn player with the Danish Radio Jazz Orchestra
- Henrik Pedersen (footballer) (born 1975), Danish professional football player
- Henry Pedersen Jr. (1929–2024), American politician from Nebraska
- Herb Pedersen (born 1944), American musician, guitarist, banjo player, and singer-songwriter
- Hilde Gjermundshaug Pedersen (born 1964), Norwegian cross-country skier
- Holger Pedersen (astronomer) (born 1946), Danish astronomer
- Holger Pedersen (linguist) (1867–1953), Danish linguist

== I ==
- Inger Pedersen (1936–2023), Norwegian politician
- Inger Stilling Pedersen (1929–2017), Danish politician

== J ==
- Jacob Pedersen (1889–1961), Norwegian track and field athlete
- James Pedersen (1868–1944), American politician
- Jamie Pedersen (born 1968), American lawyer and politician
- Jan Pedersen (speedway rider) (born 1967), Danish speedway rider
- Jan O. Pedersen (born 1962), Danish speedway rider
- Jan Ove Pedersen (born 1968), Norwegian football coach and former player
- Johanne Samueline Pedersen (1887–1961), Norwegian politician
- Johannes Pedersen (gymnast) (1892–1982), Danish gymnast
- Johannes Pedersen (theologian) (1883–1977), Danish theologian and linguist
- John Pedersen (disambiguation)
- Jonas Pedersen (1871–1953), Norwegian politician
- Jørgen V. Pedersen (born 1959), Danish road bicycle racer
- Jostein Pedersen, Norwegian commentator and "music intelligencia"

== K ==
- Karl Pedersen (chess player) (born 1940), Danish chess player
- Karl Pedersen (footballer) (1907–1977), Norwegian footballer
- Karl Pedersen (wrestler) (1902–1988), Norwegian wrestler at the 1928 Olympics
- Katrine Pedersen (born 1977), Danish football midfielder
- Kayla Pedersen (born 1989), American basketball player
- Kenneth Møller Pedersen (born 1973), Danish professional football midfielder
- Kjetil Ruthford Pedersen (born 1973), Norwegian footballer
- Knud Pedersen (1925–2014), Danish resistance leader and leader of the Churchill Boys

== L ==
- L. C. Pedersen, American politician
- Lasse Haugaard Pedersen (born 1995), Danish politician
- Laura Pedersen (born 1965), American author
- Lena Pedersen (born 1940), Canadian politician and social worker from Nunavut
- Lene Pedersen (born 1977), Norwegian ski mountaineer
- Lene Marlin Pedersen (born 1980), Norwegian musician more commonly referred to as Lene Marlin
- Lisa Brix Pedersen (born 1996), Danish discus thrower
- Lucas Lund Pedersen (born 2000), Danish footballer

== M ==
- Mads Pedersen (disambiguation)
- Marc Pedersen (born 1989), Danish footballer
- Marcus Pedersen (born 1990), Norwegian footballer
- Marcus Holmgren Pedersen (born 2000), Norwegian footballer
- Martin Pedersen (cyclist) (born 1983), Danish road bicycle racer
- Martin Pedersen (footballer) (born 1983), Danish footballer
- Martin Pedersen (tennis) (born 1987), Danish professional tennis player
- Merete Pedersen (born 1973), Danish footballer
- Mette Pedersen (born 1973), Danish badminton player
- Mia Bak Pedersen (born 1980), Danish footballer
- Michael Pedersen, (born 1986), Danish cricketer
- Mikael Pedersen (1855–1929), Danish inventor associated with the English town of Dursley
- Mikkel Gaarde Pedersen (born 2008), Danish racing driver
- Mikkel O. Pedersen (born 1997), Danish racing driver
- Monica Pedersen, American designer on the show Designed to Sell
- Monika Pedersen, Danish singer of the band Sinphonia
- Morten Gamst Pedersen (born 1981), Norwegian footballer
- Morten Pedersen (born 1972), Norwegian former footballer

== N ==
- Nancy Pedersen, American genetic epidemiologist
- Nicki Pedersen (born 1977), Danish motorcycle speedway rider
- Nicklas Pedersen (born 1987), Danish footballer
- Niels-Henning Ørsted Pedersen (1946–2005), Danish jazz bassist

== O ==
- Odd Kvaal Pedersen (1935–1990), Norwegian journalist, author and translator
- Olaf Pedersen (gymnast) (1884–1972), Danish gymnast
- Olaf Pedersen (1920–1997), Danish historian of science
- Oluf Pedersen (gymnast) (1878–1917), Danish gymnast
- Ove Pedersen (born 1954), Danish football manager and a former player

== P ==
- Paul Pedersen (composer) (born 1935), Canadian composer
- Paul Pedersen (gymnast) (1886–1948), Norwegian gymnast
- Peder Larsen Pedersen (1880–1966), Danish gymnast
- Peder Oluf Pedersen (1874–1941), Danish engineer and physicist
- Peder Pedersen (disambiguation)
- Per Pedersen (cyclist) (born 1964), Danish retired road bicycle racer
- Per Pedersen (footballer) (born 1969), Danish former footballer
- Peter Dorf Pedersen (1897–1967), Danish gymnast
- Peter Pedersen (politician), (born 1954), Swedish politician
- Poul Pedersen (1932–2016), Danish retired footballer
- Poul Lars Høgh Pedersen (1959–2021), Danish football goalkeeper

== R ==
- Ralf Pedersen (born 1973), Danish footballer
- Randy Pedersen (born 1962), American bowler and color analyst
- Ray Pedersen, American artist and graphic designer
- Red Pedersen (born 1935), Canadian politician
- Rolf Birger Pedersen (1939–2001), Norwegian footballer and football coach
- Ronni Pedersen (born 1974), Danish motorcycle speedway rider
- Rune Pedersen (footballer) (born 1979), Danish footballer
- Rune Pedersen (referee) (born 1963), Norwegian referee in the 1990s

== S ==
- Søren Pedersen (born 1978), Danish footballer
- Sigurd Pedersen (1893–1968), Norwegian politician
- Simon Azoulay Pedersen (born 1982), Danish footballer
- Snorre Pedersen (born 1972), Norwegian skeleton racer
- Solveig Pedersen (born 1965), Norwegian cross country skier
- Steinar Pedersen (born 1975), Norwegian football defender
- Steinar Pedersen (politician) (born 1947), Norwegian politician
- Steve Pedersen, American guitarist
- Susan Pedersen (historian), American historian
- Susan Pedersen (swimmer) (born 1953), American swimmer
- Sverre Lunde Pedersen (born 1992), Norwegian speed skater

== T ==
- Terese Pedersen (born 1980), Norwegian handball goalkeeper
- Terje Moland Pedersen (born 1952), Norwegian politician
- Terje Pedersen (born 1943), Norwegian javelin thrower
- Thomas Pedersen (disambiguation)
- Thor Pedersen (disambiguation)
- Thore Pedersen (born 1996), Norwegian footballer
- Torben Mark Pedersen (born 1960), Danish economist and politician, founder of the political party Liberalisterne
- Tore Pedersen (born 1969), Norwegian footballer
- Torny Pedersen (born 1946), Norwegian politician
- Torsten Schack Pedersen (born 1976), Danish politician
- Trond Pedersen (born 1951), Norwegian former football player and coach
- Trond Jøran Pedersen (born 1958), Norwegian ski jumper
- Trygve Pedersen (1884–1967), Norwegian sailor

== V ==
- Vilhelm Pedersen (1820–1859), Danish artist who illustrated the fairy tales of Hans Christian Andersen

== W ==
- Walter E. Pedersen (1911–1998), American politician
- Willy Pedersen (born 1952), Norwegian sociologist

== See also ==
- Pederson, surname
- Petersen, surname
