= 2016–17 Danish Women's League =

A-Liga
- Season: 2016–17
- Champions: Brøndby
- 2017–18 Champions League (QR): Brøndby
- Matches: 56
- Goals: 205 (3.66 per match)
- Top goalscorer: Nanna Christiansen (18 goals)

The 2016–17 Danish League was the 45th season of the top-flight of the Danish Women's Football League. Fortuna Hjørring were the defending champions.

== Format ==
The main round of the league is played in autumn as a double round-robin tournament between the 8 participating teams, where each team plays against each other both at home and away.

The six best placed teams qualify for spring championship play-offs. The finals consist once again of a double round-robin tournament among the six participating teams. The scores from the main league round carry over into the championship play-offs. The two bottom ranked teams instead play in qualification play-offs, a double round-robin tournament with the top four teams of 2016–17 1st Division for two spots in 2017–18 Danish League.

== Teams ==
=== Changes ===
▲ from 2015–16 1st Division	▼ to 2016–17 1st Division
Varde IF	ASA

=== Stadiums and locations ===
Locations of the 2015–16 Elitedivisionen teams.

Team	Location	Stadium	Capacity
Brøndby	Brøndby	Brøndby Stadium	29,000
BSF	Ballerup	Ballerup Sports Park Stadium	4,000
Fortuna Hjørring	Hjørring	Hjørring Stadium	7,500
KoldingQ	Kolding	Mosevej Sports Grounds (Note: Some matches were played at the Mosevej Pitch (Danish: Mosevej Kunstgræsbane).)	1,500
Odense Q	Odense	Marienlyst Center	
Skovbakken	Aarhus	Vejlby Stadium (Note: Some matches were played at the College Pitch (Danish: Kunstgræsbanen Idrætshøjskolen).)	5,200
Varde IF	Varde	Vestjysk Bank Stadium	4,000
Vejle B	Vejle	Vejle Stadium (Note: Some matches were played at Vejle Athletics Stadium (Danish: Gl. Vejle Stadion); one match was played at the College Pitch (Danish: Vejle Idrætsefterskoles Kunstgræsbane).)	10,657

=== Personnel and kits ===
Team	Manager	Captain	Kit	Sponsor	Sponsor
Brøndby	(Denmark) Per Nielsen	(Denmark) Simone Boye	(Denmark)	(Denmark)	
BSF	(Denmark) Thomas Maale (interim)	(Denmark) Nikoline Andresen	(Denmark)	(Denmark)	
Fortuna Hjørring	(Denmark) Brian Sørensen	(Romania) Florentina Olar	(Denmark)	(Denmark)	
KoldingQ	(Denmark) Daniel K. Theemann	(Denmark) Sanne Troelsgaard	(Denmark)	(Denmark)	
Odense Q	(Denmark) Said Sannes	(Denmark) Tenna Kappel	(Germany) Puma	(Denmark)	
Skovbakken	(Denmark) Henrik Varbøl	(Denmark) Sif Rykær	(Denmark)	(Denmark)	
Varde	(Denmark) Anders Hørkjær	(Denmark)	(Denmark)	(Denmark)	
Vejle	(Denmark) Jesper Søgaard	(Denmark) Charlotte Sørensen	(Denmark) Hummel	(Denmark)	

=== Managerial changes ===
Team	Outgoing manager	Manner of departure	Date of vacancy	Position in the table	Incoming manager	Date of appointment
BSF	(Denmark) John Froman	Sacked	16 May 2017	6th	(Denmark) Thomas Maale (interim)	16 May 2017

== Regular season ==
=== League table ===
Pos	Team	Pld	W	D	L	GF	GA	GD	Pts	Qualification
1	Brøndby	14	13	1	0	56	5	+51	40	Championship play-offs
2	Fortuna Hjørring	14	12	1	1	52	13	+39	37	Championship play-offs
3	KoldingQ	14	8	0	6	23	17	+6	24	Championship play-offs
4	Skovbakken	14	7	2	5	23	20	+3	23	Championship play-offs
5	BSF	14	4	2	8	15	28	−13	14	Championship play-offs
6	Vejle B	14	3	3	8	7	29	−22	12	Championship play-offs
7	Odense Q	14	3	2	9	20	27	−7	11	Qualification play-offs
8	Varde IF	14	0	1	13	9	66	−57	1	Qualification play-offs

Source: Danish Football Association (in Danish)
Rules for classification: 1) Points; 2) Goal difference; 3) Goals scored; 4) Away goals scored; 5) Play-off (played on neutral ground if determining teams for different rounds); 6) Draw.

=== Results ===
Home \ Away	BRØ	BSF	HJØ	KOL	ODE	SKO	VAR	VEJ
Brøndby		4–0	2–2	4–1	5–0	3–1	10–0	4–0
BSF	0–2		0–4	1–2	1–3	0–3	3–0	1–1
Fortuna Hjørring	1–2	2–1		2–0	4–1	5–0	9–3	6–0
KoldingQ	0–3	0–1	2–3		2–1	1–0	4–0	2–0
Odense Q	0–2	2–2	0–2	1–2		1–2	5–1	0–1
Skovbakken	0–1	3–0	1–6	1–0	3–2		5–0	0–0
Varde IF	0–8	2–4	1–5	0–5	0–4	0–0		1–2
Vejle B	0–6	0–1	0–1	0–2	0–0	1–4	2–1	

Source: Danish Football Association
Legend: Blue = home team win; Yellow = draw; Red = away team win.

== Play-offs ==
=== Championship ===
Bonus points were added by placement: 10 for first place, 8 for second and then 6, 4, 2 and 0. (Points were not carried over and then halved to add to the tally like in previous seasons.)

Pos	Team	Pld	W	D	L	GF	GA	GD	Pts	Qualification
1	Brøndby (C)	10	8	2	0	36	5	+31	36	2017–18 Champions League (QR)
2	Fortuna Hjørring	10	7	3	0	24	5	+19	32	2017–18 Champions League (QR)
3	Skovbakken	10	4	1	5	13	19	−6	17	
4	KoldingQ	10	3	1	6	18	23	−5	16	
5	BSF	10	2	0	8	8	31	−23	8	
6	Vejle B	10	1	3	6	6	22	−16	6	

Source: Danish Football Association (in Danish), soccerway.com
Rules for classification: 1) Points; 2) Goal difference; 3) Goals scored; 4) Away goals scored; 5) Play-off (played on neutral ground if determining teams for different rounds); 6) Draw.
(C) Champions

==== Results ====
Home \ Away	BRØ	BSF	HJØ	KOL	SKO	VEJ
Brøndby		5–0	2–2	7–1	5–0	5–0
BSF	0–1		0–3	0–10	4–1	2–3
Fortuna Hjørring	1–1	3–0		3–0	4–0	1–1
KoldingQ						
Skovbakken						
Vejle B						

Source: Danish Football Association
Legend: Blue = home team win; Yellow = draw; Red = away team win.

== Season statistics ==
=== Top scorers ===
Rank	Player	Club	Goals
1	(Denmark) Nanna Christiansen	Brøndby	18
2	(Denmark) Signe Holt Andersen	Skovbakken	9
3	(Denmark) Simone Boye	Brøndby	8
3	(Denmark) Nicoline Sørensen	Brøndby	8
5	(Denmark) Camilla Kur Larsen	Fortuna	7
5	(Denmark) Frederikke Thøgersen	Fortuna	7
5	(Denmark) Lotte Troelsgaard	KoldingQ	7
8	(Denmark) Sarah Dyrehauge	Fortuna	6
8	(Denmark) Caroline Møller	Fortuna	6
10	(Denmark) Tanya Arngrimsen	BSF	5
10	(Serbia) Nevena Damjanović	Fortuna	5
10	(Denmark) Louise Lundsgaard	Brøndby	5
10	(Romania) Florentina Olar	Fortuna	5
10	(Denmark) Britta Olsen	Odense Q	5
