= Gizem Gönültaş =

Turkish footballer (born 1993)

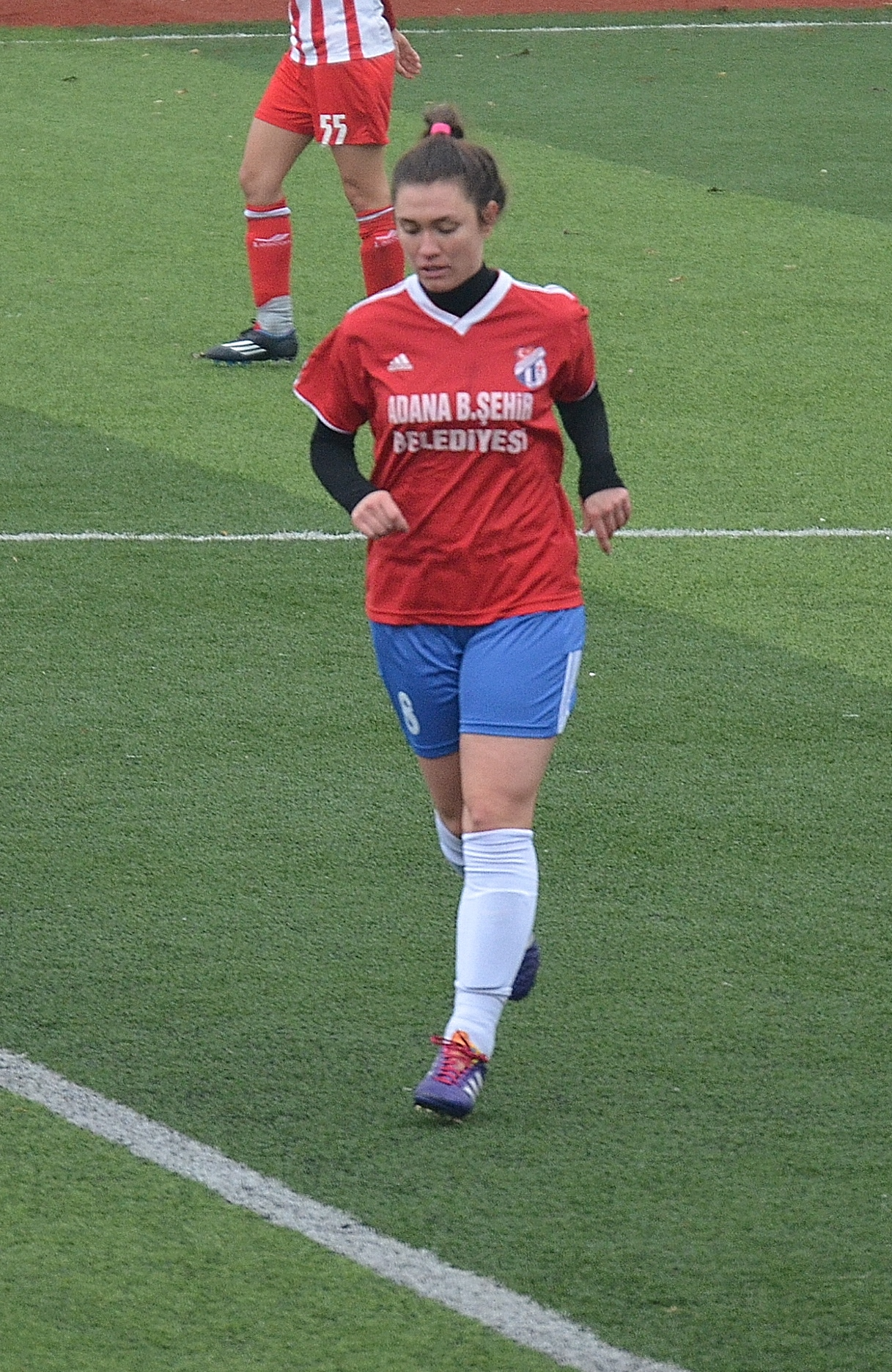
- Gizem Gönültaş in the 2014–15 season.

Personal information
- Date of birth: July 13, 1993 (age 33)
- Place of birth: Ordu, Turkey
- Position: Forward

Team information
- Current team: Beşiktaş J.K.
- Number: 10

Senior career*
Years	Team	Apps	(Gls)
2007–2011	Altaş Soya Spor	28	(9)
2011–2012	Orduspor	9	(3)
2012	Çamlıcaspor	18	(3)
2013–2014	Adana İdmanyurduspor	21	(5)
2015–	Beşiktaş J.K.	115	(71)

International career^{‡}
2008–2010	Turkey U-17	15	(4)
2009–2012	Turkey U-19	31	(1)
2014	Turkey U-21	1	(0)
2016-2020	Turkey	12	(0)
- * Club domestic league appearances and goals as of 23 October 2022 ‡ National team caps and goals as of 17 January 2020

Gizem Gönültaş (born July 13, 1993) is a Turkish women's football forward currently playing in the Turkish Women's First League for Beşiktaş J.K. with jersey number 10. She played in the national teams of Turkish girls' U-17, women's U-19, women's U-21 and lately in the Turkey women's team.

== Early life ==
Gizem Gönültaş was born to a blind mother Atiye Gönültaş in Ordu, Turkey on July 13, 1993. She has an older brother and a younger sister, İrem, who is also a footballer. Both sisters are supported by their mother in sports.

She is a student of physical education and sports at Marmara University to become a teacher.

== Club career ==
She began football playing already in the primary school. After the formation of a girls' football team Soyaspor, Gönültaş began her sports career.

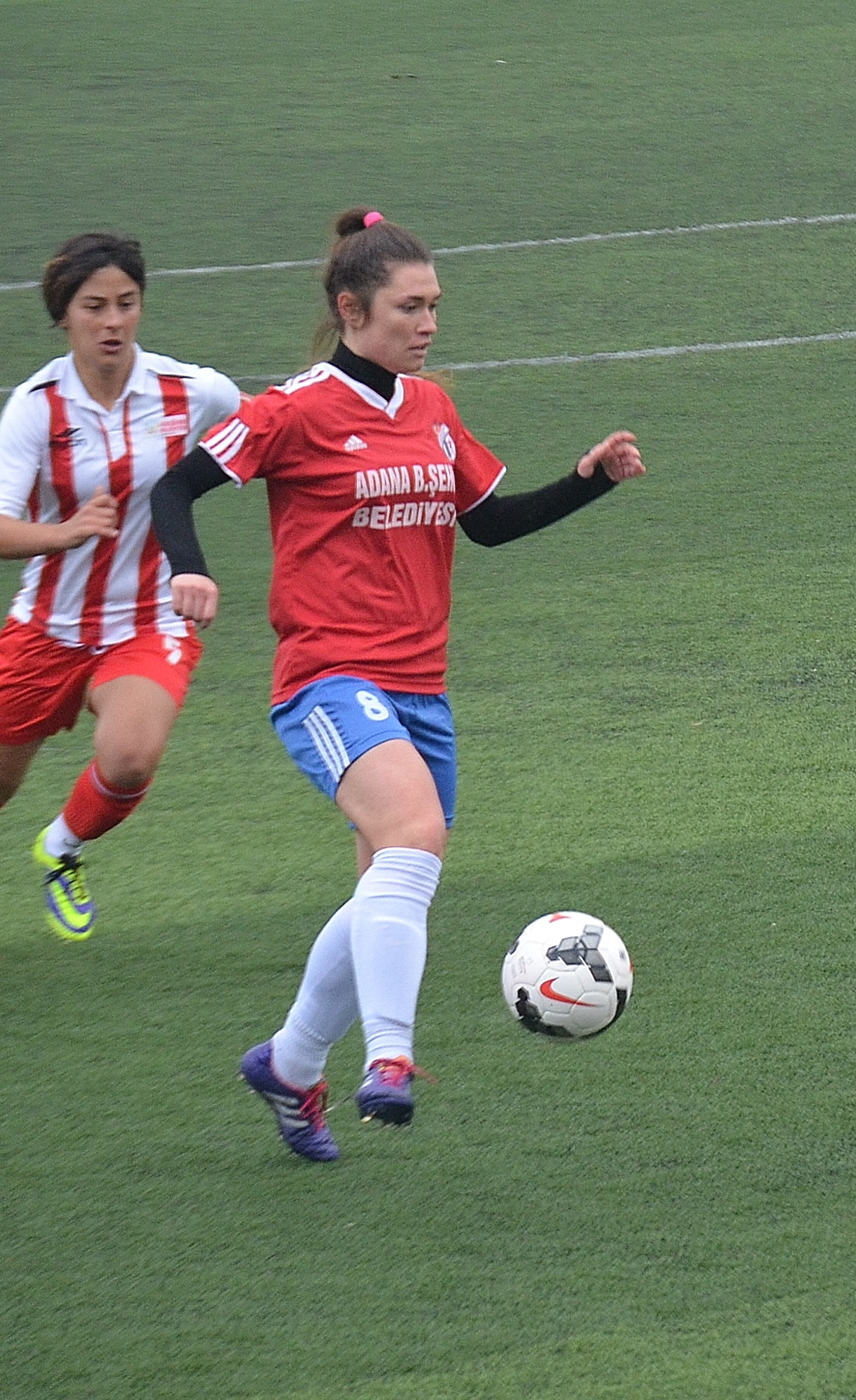
Gizem Gönültaş playing for Adana İdmanyurduspor in the away match vs Ataşehir Belediyespor (2014–15 season).

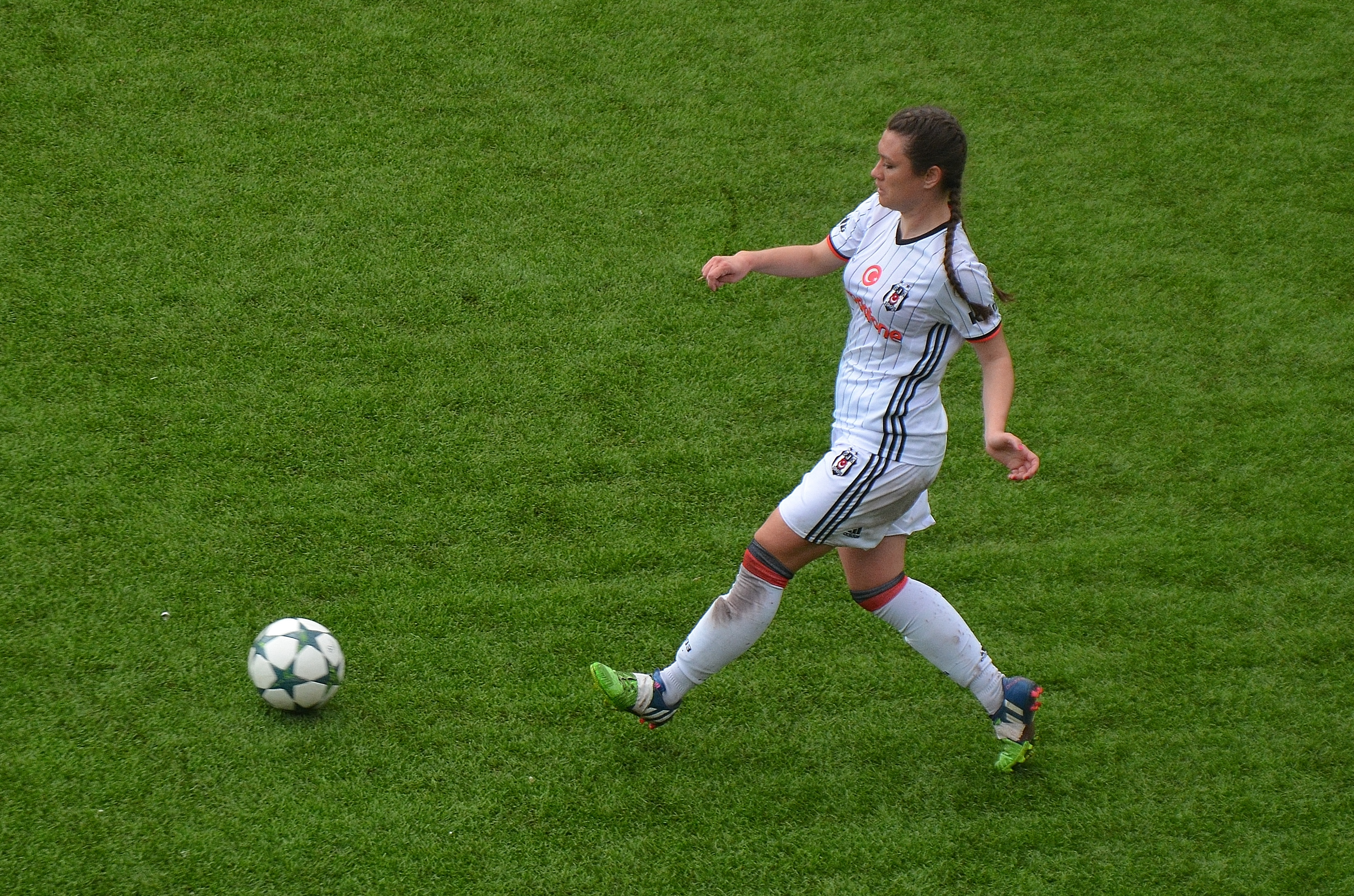
Gizem Gönültaş playing for Beşiktaş J.K. in the 2016–17 season's play-off match.

Gizem Gönültaş received her license on May 9, 2007, for her hometown club Soyaspor, where she played in the Women's Second League during the 2008–09 season. After two more seasons with Soyaspor in the Turkish Women's Regional League, she transferred to Orduspor to play in the Second League. In the 2012–13 season, she moved to Çamlıcaspor, which played in the Women's First League. After one season, she became part of Adana İdmanyurduspor.

In the second half of the 2014–15 season, she was transferred by the newly established women's football side of Beşiktaş J.K., which started in the Turkish Women's Third League. Scoring 21 goals in 10 appearances, she played an important role for her team's promotion to the Women's Second League for the 2015–16 season. Following her team's promotion, she played in the 2016–17 Turkish Women's First Football League. She enjoyed the champion title of her team in the 2018-19 season. She took part at the 2019–20 UEFA Women's Champions League - Group 9 matches. Following her team^s champion title of the 2020-21 Turkcell League, she played in two matches of the 2021–22 UEFA Women's Champions League qualifying rounds.

== International career ==
Gönültaş was admitted to the Turkey girls' U-17 team, and debuted in the 2009 UEFA Women's Under-17 Championship – Group 5 match against the Netherlands on October 20, 2008. She took part at the 2010 UEFA Women's Under-17 Championship – Group 4 matches. She capped in 15 matches in total and scored four goals.

She played her first match with the Turkey women's U-19 team on August 15, 2009, against Moldova. Gönültaş played in the 2010 UEFA Women's U-19 Championship First qualifying round – Group 7, 2010 UEFA Women's U-19 Championship Second qualifying round – Group 1, 2011 UEFA Women's U-19 Championship First qualifying round – Group 9 and 2011 UEFA Women's U-19 Championship Second qualifying round – Group 3 matches. She capped 33 times for the women's U-19 team.

Gönültaş was also part of the Turkey women's U-21, and the Turkey women's teams.

== Career statistics ==
As of 23 October 2022.

Club	Season	League			Continental		National		Total	
Club	Season	Division	Apps	Goals	Apps	Goals	Apps	Goals	Apps	Goals
Altaş Soya Spor	2008–09	Second League	6	0	–	–	5	2	11	2
Altaş Soya Spor	2009–10	Regional League	10	7	–	–	22	3	32	10
Altaş Soya Spor	2010–11	Regional League	12	2	–	–	12	0	24	2
Altaş Soya Spor	Total		28	9	–	–	39	5	67	14
Orduspor	2011–12	Second League	9	3	–	–	7	0	16	3
Orduspor	Total		9	3	–	–	7	0	16	3
Çamlıcaspor	2012–13	First League	18	3	–	–	0	0	18	3
Çamlıcaspor	Total		18	3			0	0	18	3
Adana İdmanyurduspor	2013–14	First League	12	2	–	–	0	0	12	2
Adana İdmanyurduspor	2014–15	First League	9	3	–	–	1	0	10	3
Adana İdmanyurduspor	Total		21	5	–	–	1	0	22	5
Beşiktaş J.K.	2014–15	Third League	10	21	–	–	0	0	10	21
Beşiktaş J.K.	2015–16	Second League	19	11	–	–	3	0	22	11
Beşiktaş J.K.	2016–17	First League	17	8	–	–	0	0	17	8
Beşiktaş J.K.	2017–18	First League	14	5	–	–	0	0	14	5
Beşiktaş J.K.	2018–19	First League	18	8	–	–	5	0	23	8
Beşiktaş J.K.	2019–20	First League	15	5	3	0	4	0	22	5
Beşiktaş J.K.	2020–21	First League	2	2	0	0	0	0	2	2
Beşiktaş J.K.	2021–22	Super League	18	6	2	0	0	0	20	6
Beşiktaş J.K.	2022–23	Super League	2	1	0	0	0	0	2	1
Beşiktaş J.K.	Total		115	71	5	0	12	0	132	67
Career total			191	87	5	0	59	5	255	92

== Honours ==
Turkish Women's First League

Beşiktaş J.K.
Winners (2): 2018–19, 2020–21
Runners-up (2): 2016–17, 2017–18

Turkish Women's Second League

Beşiktaş J.K.
Winners (1): 2015–16

Turkish Women's Third League

Beşiktaş J.K.
Winners (1): 2014–15
