= Melisa Ertürk =

Turkish footballer

Personal information
- Full name: Melisa Dilber Ertürk
- Date of birth: August 9, 1993 (age 33)
- Place of birth: Ottawa, Ontario, Canada
- Height: 1.70 m (5 ft 7 in)

Youth career
- 2003–2006: Gloucester Hornets SC
- 2006–2009: Nepean Hotspurs
- 2007–2010: → Queen Elizabeth Royals

College career
Years	Team	Apps	(Gls)
2011	Middle Tennessee Blue Raiders	20	(2)
2012	UT Martin Skyhawks	22	(0)

Senior career*
Years	Team	Apps	(Gls)
2010–2012	Ottawa Fury Women		

International career^{‡}
2010	Turkey U-17	4	(3)
2010–2012	Turkey U-19	18	(4)
2010–2012	Turkey	4	(0)
- * Club domestic league appearances and goals ‡ National team caps and goals as of July 5, 2012

Melisa Dilber Ertürk (born August 9, 1993) is a women's football midfielder playing in Canada and the United States. Born in Canada, she was a member of the Turkey women's U17, U19 and Turkey women's national teams.

== Private life ==
Ertürk was born to Mehmet Ertürk and his Franco-Canadian spouse in Ottawa, Ontario, Canada on August 9, 1993.

As a girl, she was initially interested in gymnastics. However, she was inspired by her elder sister, who played football. At the age of six, she asked her mother for permission to play football. She liked it, playing much after the first match. She began to play in the beginners' league. The next year, she took part in competition league. She had to play with older children, because she was more skilled than her peers.

She has the strong support of her parents, who watch her playing from the bleachers and plan their free time according to their daughter's sports program. Her sister's football career ended after a severe injury. Her father is still in active sports. He plays football in the club Istanbulspor SC, which he co-founded. Ertürk admits that her managers contributed much to her development in football. The 1.70 m (5 ft 7 in) tall sportswoman played also varsity volleyball.

Ertürk received a bilingual secondary school diploma (French immersion diploma). Her poor knowledge of Turkish became a language barrier and a communication problem during her time with the Turkey national team. After her first participation at the national team training camp, she began a Turkish language course in Canada.

== Playing career ==
=== Club ===
Ertürk played football in school teams during her education. As a player in the midfielder position, she was with [Nepean Hotspurs SC, Ontario, Middle Tennessee Blue Raiders at Middle Tennessee State University. She played in the U17 team of the Ottawa Fury Women, who compete in the American-Canadian USL W-League. Ertürk served as a team captain in 2009.

=== International ===
Turkey girls' U17

Ertürk was admitted to the Turkey girls' U17 team. She played in the International Women's Under-17 Friendship Tournament held in Drama, Greece, appearing for the first time in the team against Bulgaria on June 27, 2010. She capped four times and scored three goals for the national U17 team.

Turkey women's U19

She became a member of the Turkey women's U19 team. She played in the 2010 Kuban Spring Tournament held in Sochi, Russia, and debuted for the national U19 team in the match against Southern Russia team on March 6, 2010. She scored three goals in the tournament.

She took part in the 2010 UEFA Women's U-19 Championship Second qualifying round – Group 1 matches and debuted against Sweden U19 team in Örebro, Sweden on March 27, 2010. She netted a goal against Ireland on March 29, 2010. She was called up again to the national U19 team for the 2011 UEFA Women's U-19 Championship First qualifying round, and played in three matches. Ertürk took part at the 2011 UEFA Women's U-19 Championship Second qualifying round – Group 3 matches in Wales between March 31 and April 5, 2011. She participated in the matches against Iceland and Germany. Before the match against Wales, she contracted acute appendicitis and underwent a successful surgery in a hospital at Carmarthen, Wales. Ertürk capped in total 18 times and scored four goals.

Turkey women's

Ertürk participated at the 2011 FIFA Women's World Cup qualification – UEFA Group 5 matches as a member of the Turkey women's team. Her first appearance was in the game against Austria in Anger, Styria, Austria on June 23, 2010. She took part also in the matches against England in Walsall, England on July 29, 2010, and against Austria in Samsun on August 25, 2010. Her next participation was at the UEFA Women's Euro 2013 qualifying – Group 2 match against Germany in İzmir on February 15, 2012.

== Honours ==
- Member of the Honor Roll (2003, 2007–08)
- Teamwork Award by Gloucester Hornets SC (2003, 2004)
- Leadership Award by Gloucester Hornets SC (2005, 2006)
- Athletic and Sportsmanship Award by Queen Elizabeth School (2007)
- Champion: City Schools Championship (2007–08, 2010–11),
- Runner-up: Ontario Federation of School Athletic Associations competition (2008–09)
- Runner-up: Provincial All-Star Championship (2009)
- USL North American champion (2010)
- Super-Y North American Championship title with Ottawa Fury Women U17 (2010)
- Award of Excellence (2010)
