= 2011 UEFA Women's Under-19 Championship second qualifying round =

Football tournament qualification stage

2011 UEFA Women's U-19 Championship Second Qualifying Round is the second round of qualifications for the Final Tournament of 2011 UEFA Women's Under-19 Championship. The matches will be played in March and April 2011. 24 teams are split into 6 groups of 4 and teams in each group play each other once. 23 of those advanced from the 2011 UEFA Women's U-19 Championship First qualifying round, Germany had a bye to this round due to being the top ranked nation. Italy received byes to the final as host. The top team in each group and the best second-placed team with the best record against the sides first and third in their group will enter the 2011 UEFA Women's U-19 Championship.

== Groups ==
=== Group 1 ===
Team	Pld	W	D	L	GF	GA	GD	Pts
Netherlands	3	2	0	1	14	1	+13	6
Denmark	3	2	0	1	12	3	+9	6
France	3	2	0	1	8	3	+5	6
Lithuania	3	0	0	3	0	27	−27	0

31 March 2011

Netherlands	11–0	Lithuania
Martens 5', 6', 43', 50'; Rijsdijk 13', 45+1' van de Sanden 17', 36'; Jansen 51'; Bakker 71', 83'	Report

Odense Atletikstadion, Odense

31 March 2011

France	0–3	Denmark
	Report	Harder 21', 61'; Junge Pedersen 32'

TRE-FOR Park, Odense

2 April 2011

France	7–0	Lithuania
Lavaud 6'; Morel 9'; La Villa 52'; Demarle 60', 73' (pen.); Asseyi 71', 85'	Report

Haderslev Fodboldstadion, Haderslev

2 April 2011

Denmark	0–3	Netherlands
	Report	Coolen 46'; Martens 54' van de Sanden 60'

TRE-FOR Park, Odense

5 April 2011

Netherlands	0–1	France
	Report	La Villa 35'

Jokri Park, Vejle

5 April 2011

Lithuania	0–9	Denmark
	Report	Kristensen 26', 29'; Smidt Nielsen 33'; Trustrup Jensen 48', 62', 90'; Harder 65', 79'; Moeslund 70'

TRE-FOR Park, Odense

=== Group 2 ===
Team	Pld	W	D	L	GF	GA	GD	Pts
Russia	3	2	0	1	3	2	+1	6
Belgium	3	1	2	0	6	5	+1	5
Finland	3	1	1	1	9	8	+1	4
Serbia	3	0	1	2	7	10	−3	1

31 March 2011

Russia	1–0	Finland
Cholovyaga 73'	Report

Sputnik-Sport, Sochi
Attendance: 115

31 March 2011

Belgium	2–2	Serbia
Coryn 16'; Wullaert 20'	Report	Radojičić 40'; N. Damjanović 44'

Sputnik-Sport, Sochi
Attendance: 75

2 April 2011

Russia	2–1	Serbia
Cholovyaga 21'; Makarenko 40'	Report	Ćubrilo 55'

Sputnik-Sport Center, Sochi
Attendance: 110

2 April 2011

Finland	3–3	Belgium
Muinonen 5'; Sandell 18'; Tolvanen 25'	Report	Schryvers 4'; Charlier 28'; Wullaert 30'

Sputnik-Sport Center, Sochi
Attendance: 70

5 April 2011

Belgium	1–0	Russia
Coryn 67'	Report

Istochnik stadium, Sochi
Attendance: 50

5 April 2011

Serbia	4–6	Finland
Krstić 11'; Ćubrilo 73'; Damjanović 83', 85' (pen.)	Report	Vatanen 5'; Muinonen 23'; Norrena 42', 46', 63'; Krstić 45+2' (o.g.)

Sputnik-Sport Center, Sochi
Attendance: 100

=== Group 3 ===
Team	Pld	W	D	L	GF	GA	GD	Pts
Germany	3	2	1	0	6	1	+5	7
Wales	3	1	1	1	2	3	−1	4
Turkey	3	1	0	2	3	4	−1	3
Iceland	3	1	0	2	3	6	−3	3

31 March 2011

Iceland	1–3	Turkey
Þorvaldsdóttir 13'	Report	L. Güngör 26', 74', 77'

Parc y Scarlets, Llanelli

31 March 2011

Germany	1–1	Wales
Wensing 8'	Report	Jones 70'

Parc y Scarlets, Llanelli

2 April 2011

Germany	2–0	Turkey
Beckmann 36'; Simon 51'	Report

Richmond Park, Carmarthen

2 April 2011

Wales	0–2	Iceland
	Report	Gudmundsdóttir 9'; Ásbjörnsdóttir 70'

Stebonheath Park, Llanelli

5 April 2011

Iceland	0–3	Germany
	Report	Beckmann 24'; Petzelberger 25'; Simon 49'

Stebonheath Park, Llanelli

5 April 2011

Turkey	0–1	Wales
	Report	Green 62'

Richmond Park, Carmarthen

=== Group 4 ===
Team	Pld	W	D	L	GF	GA	GD	Pts
Norway	3	3	0	0	5	0	+5	9
England	3	2	0	1	6	1	+5	6
Portugal	3	1	0	2	2	6	−4	3
Croatia	3	0	0	3	1	7	−6	0

31 March 2011

England	3–0	Croatia
Spence 17'; Parris 44'; Eli 56'	Report

FC Novigrad, Novigrad

31 March 2011

Norway	2–0	Portugal
Thorisdottir 44'; Haavi 56'	Report

Gradski, Umag

2 April 2011

England	3–0	Portugal
Greenwood 56'; Nantes 67' (o.g.); Staniforth 69'	Report

Gradski, Umag

2 April 2011

Croatia	0–2	Norway
	Report	Stolsmo Hegerberg 33'; Hegerberg 65'

Laco Stadion, Novigrad

5 April 2011

Norway	1–0	England
Bjånesøy 12'	Report

Laco Stadion, Novigrad

5 April 2011

Portugal	2–1	Croatia
Luis 31', 90+5'	Report	Klarić 51'

Gradski, Umag

=== Group 5 ===
Team	Pld	W	D	L	GF	GA	GD	Pts
Switzerland	3	2	1	0	6	2	+4	7
Sweden	3	1	2	0	8	2	+6	5
Czech Republic	3	1	1	1	5	5	+0	4
Ukraine	3	0	0	3	2	12	−10	0

31 March 2011

Switzerland	1–1	Sweden
Wälti 66'	Report	Rubensson 58'

Sport KT Arena, Simferopol
Attendance: 1,200

31 March 2011

Czech Republic	4–1	Ukraine
Voňková 34', 65', 68'; Bartoňová 40'	Report	Sedláčková 88' (o.g.)

Sport KT Arena, Simferopol
Attendance: 1,000

2 April 2011

Sweden	0–0	Czech Republic
	Report

Sport KT Arena, Simferopol
Attendance: 400

2 April 2011

Switzerland	1–0	Ukraine
Gerber 11'	Report

Sport KT Arena, Simferopol
Attendance: 200

5 April 2011

Czech Republic	1–4	Switzerland
Bartoňová 75'	Report	Aigbogun 20', 60'; Wälti 36'; Canetta 59'

Fiolent Stadium, Simferopol
Attendance: 3,000

5 April 2011

Ukraine	1–7	Sweden
Ovdiychuk 35'	Report	Andersson 5'; Rolfö 33', 34'; Rubensson 42', 90+4'; Sadiku 70'; Ilestedt 75' (pen.)

Sport KT Arena, Simferopol
Attendance: 800

=== Group 6 ===
Team	Pld	W	D	L	GF	GA	GD	Pts
Spain	3	3	0	0	9	1	+8	9
Austria	3	1	1	1	8	7	+1	4
Scotland	3	0	2	1	6	7	−1	2
Poland	3	0	1	2	2	10	−8	1

31 March 2011

Spain	3–0	Poland
Calderón 26'; García 58'; Méndez 69'	Report

StFV Anlage Murauer Bier Arena, Graz

31 March 2011

Austria	3–3	Scotland
Aschauer 3'; Puntigam 10'; Makas 76'	Report	Docherty 12'; Pia 79'; Evans 90+2'

ADA Stadion Anger, Anger

2 April 2011

Scotland	1–2	Spain
McMurchie 33'	Report	Sampedro 50', 73' (pen.)

StFV Anlage Murauer Bier Arena, Graz

2 April 2011

Austria	5–0	Poland
Koren 22'; Manhart 29' (pen.); Makas 42', 45+1', 71'	Report

ADA Stadium Anger, Anger

5 April 2011

Spain	4–0	Austria
García 6'; Calderón 54'; Lázaro 62'; Putellas 80'	Report

ADA Stadium Anger, Anger

5 April 2011

Poland	2–2	Scotland
Lichtenstein 3', 73'	Report	Mitchell 82', 90'

StFV Anlage Murauer Bier Arena, Graz

== Ranking of second-placed teams ==
In the ranking of the second-place finishers, only the results against the sides finishing first and third count.

Grp	Team	Pld	W	D	L	GF	GA	GD	Pts
2	Belgium	2	1	1	0	4	3	+1	4
3	Wales	2	1	1	0	2	1	+1	4
4	England	2	1	0	1	3	1	+2	3
1	Denmark	2	1	0	1	3	3	0	3
5	Sweden	2	0	2	0	1	1	0	2
6	Austria	2	0	1	1	3	7	−4	1

== See also ==
- 2011 UEFA Women's U-19 Championship First qualifying round
