= Thomas Pedersen =

Thomas Pedersen may refer to:

- Thomas Pedersen (handballer) (born 1980), Danish handballer
- Thomas Pedersen (volleyball) (born 1993), Danish volleyball player
- Thomas Pedersen (singer), Norwegian singer and member of Cir.Cuz
- Thomas Garm Pedersen, Danish professor in physics and nanotechnology
- Thomas Vilhelm Pedersen (1820–1859), Danish painter and illustrator
