= Freedom and Prosperity =

Freedom and Prosperity can refer to:

- Center for Freedom and Prosperity, an American nonprofit organization
- Freedom and Prosperity Party (Australia), an Australian political party
- Freedom and Prosperity (Poland), a Polish political party
- Rhode Island Center for Freedom and Prosperity, a public policy think tank located in Rhode Island
- The Liberalists – Freedom and Prosperity, a Danish political party
