= Helle Nielsen =

Helle Nielsen may refer to:

- Helle Nielsen (badminton)
- Helle Nielsen (footballer)
- Helle Trevino (née Nielsen), bodybuilder
