= 2010 UEFA Women's Under-19 Championship first qualifying round =

Football tournament qualification stage

The 2010 UEFA Women's Under-19 Championship First qualifying round was the first round of qualifications for the Final Tournament of 2010 UEFA Women's Under-19 Championship. 44 teams are split into 11 groups of 4 and teams in each group play each other once. The top two teams in each group and the best third-placed team will enter the 2010 UEFA Women's U-19 Championship Second qualifying round.

== Summary ==
Teams that have secured a place in the 2010 UEFA Women's U-19 Championship Second qualifying round were.

- Austria
- Azerbaijan
- Belgium
- Bosnia and Herzegovina
- Czech Republic
- Denmark
- England
- Finland
- France
- Hungary
- Republic of Ireland
- Iceland
- Italy
- Netherlands
- Norway
- Poland
- Russia
- Scotland
- Serbia
- Spain
- Sweden
- Switzerland
- Turkey

Serbia was best third-place finisher, being the only third placed team to draw one of its games against the top two in their group.

== Group 1 ==
- Host country: Croatia

Team	Pld	W	D	L	GF	GA	GD	Pts
Republic of Ireland	3	3	0	0	13	2	+11	9
Finland	3	2	0	1	5	4	+1	6
Croatia	3	1	0	2	4	5	-1	3
Faroe Islands	3	0	0	3	0	11	-11	0

19-09-2009

Republic of Ireland	3 – 0	Croatia

19-09-2009

Finland	1 – 0	Faroe Islands

21-09-2009

Republic of Ireland	7 – 0	Faroe Islands

21-09-2009

Croatia	1 – 2	Finland

24-09-2009

Finland	2 – 3	Republic of Ireland

24-09-2009

Faroe Islands	0 – 3	Croatia

== Group 2 ==
- Host country: Estonia

Team	Pld	W	D	L	GF	GA	GD	Pts
Sweden	3	2	1	0	11	2	+9	7
Czech Republic	3	2	0	1	5	3	+2	6
Estonia	3	1	0	2	2	11	-9	3
Slovenia	3	0	1	2	3	5	-2	1

19-09-2009

Sweden	2 – 2	Slovenia

19-09-2009

Czech Republic	3 – 1	Estonia

21-09-2009

Czech Republic	2 – 1	Slovenia

21-09-2009

Estonia	0 – 8	Sweden

24-09-2009

Sweden	1 – 0	Czech Republic

24-09-2009

Slovenia	0 – 1	Estonia

== Group 3 ==
- Host country: Denmark

Team	Pld	W	D	L	GF	GA	GD	Pts
Denmark	3	3	0	0	14	1	+13	9
Bosnia and Herzegovina	3	2	0	1	9	9	0	6
Wales	3	1	0	2	8	8	0	3
Moldova	3	0	0	3	0	13	-13	0

19-09-2009

Wales	2 – 6	Bosnia and Herzegovina

19-09-2009

Denmark	5 – 0	Moldova

21-09-2009

Wales	5 – 0	Moldova

21-09-2009

Bosnia and Herzegovina	0 – 7	Denmark

24-09-2009

Denmark	2 – 1	Wales

24-09-2009

Moldova	0 – 3	Bosnia and Herzegovina

== Group 4 ==
- Host country: Bulgaria

Team	Pld	W	D	L	GF	GA	GD	Pts
Italy	3	3	0	0	14	0	+14	9
Scotland	3	2	0	1	7	3	+4	6
Bulgaria	3	1	0	2	2	11	-9	3
Northern Ireland	3	0	0	3	0	9	-9	0

19-09-2009

Scotland	2 – 0	Northern Ireland

19-09-2009

Italy	6 – 0	Bulgaria

21-09-2009

Northern Ireland	0 – 6	Italy

21-09-2009

Scotland	5 – 1	Bulgaria

24-09-2009

Italy	2 – 0	Scotland

24-09-2009

Bulgaria	1 – 0	Northern Ireland

== Group 5 ==
- Host country: Netherlands

Team	Pld	W	D	L	GF	GA	GD	Pts
Netherlands	3	2	1	0	17	2	+15	7
Poland	3	2	1	0	10	1	+9	7
Israel	3	1	0	2	4	16	-12	3
Lithuania	3	0	0	3	1	13	-12	0

19-09-2009

Poland	3 – 0	Lithuania

19-09-2009

Netherlands	9 – 1	Israel

21-09-2009

Israel	0 – 6	Poland

21-09-2009

Netherlands	7 – 0	Lithuania

24-09-2009

Poland	1 – 1	Netherlands

24-09-2009

Lithuania	1 – 3	Israel

== Group 6 ==
- Host country: England

Team	Pld	W	D	L	GF	GA	GD	Pts
Norway	3	2	1	0	18	2	+16	7
England	3	2	1	0	8	2	+9	7
Slovakia	3	1	0	2	7	9	-2	3
Belarus	3	0	0	3	1	21	-20	0

19-09-2009

Norway	5 – 1	Slovakia

19-09-2009

England	4 – 0	Belarus

21-09-2009

Belarus	0 – 12	Norway

21-09-2009

England	3 – 1	Slovakia

24-09-2009

Norway	1 – 1	England

24-09-2009

Slovakia	5 – 1	Belarus

== Group 7 ==
- Host country: Turkey

Team	Pld	W	D	L	GF	GA	GD	Pts
France	3	3	0	0	17	1	+16	9
Turkey	3	1	1	1	15	6	+9	4
Serbia	3	1	1	1	4	6	-2	4
Georgia	3	0	0	3	0	23	-23	0

19-09-2009

Serbia	1 – 1	Turkey
Markovic 14'	Report	Ersoy 30'

Buca Arena, Buca
Referee: Monica Larsen

19-09-2009

France	7 – 0	Georgia

21-09-2009

France	5 – 1	Turkey
Dali 6'; Lavaud 48', 90'; Crammer 60', 82'	Report	Kara 9'

Buca Arena, Buca
Referee: Monica Larsen

21-09-2009

Georgia	0 – 3	Serbia

24-09-2009

Serbia	0 – 5	France

24-09-2009

Turkey	13 – 0	Georgia
Ersoy 4', 90'; Elgalp 6', 44', 47', 61', 85'; Aladağ 23', 64'; Kara 48', 60', 90+1'; Gönültaş 50'	Report

Buca Arena, Buca
Referee: Paula Thorn

== Group 8 ==
- Host country: Hungary

Team	Pld	W	D	L	GF	GA	GD	Pts
Belgium	3	2	1	0	14	2	+12	7
Hungary	3	2	1	0	11	0	+11	7
Latvia	3	1	0	2	8	13	-5	3
Armenia	3	0	0	3	2	20	-18	0

19-09-2009

Hungary	7 – 0	Latvia

19-09-2009

Belgium	10 – 0	Armenia

21-09-2009

Latvia	2 – 4	Belgium

21-09-2009

Hungary	4 – 0	Armenia

24-09-2009

Belgium	0 – 0	Hungary

24-09-2009

Armenia	2 – 6	Latvia

== Group 9 ==
- Host country: Austria

Team	Pld	W	D	L	GF	GA	GD	Pts
Russia	3	3	0	0	9	1	+8	9
Austria	3	2	0	1	4	2	+2	6
Kazakhstan	3	1	0	2	3	6	-3	3
Greece	3	0	0	3	2	9	-7	0

19-09-2009

Russia	5 – 1	Greece

19-09-2009

Austria	2 – 1	Kazakhstan

21-09-2009

Kazakhstan	0 – 3	Russia

21-09-2009

Austria	2 – 0	Greece

24-09-2009

Russia	1 – 0	Austria

24-09-2009

Greece	1 – 2	Kazakhstan

== Group 10 ==
- Host country: Azerbaijan

Team	Pld	W	D	L	GF	GA	GD	Pts
Spain	3	3	0	0	11	1	+10	9
Ukraine	3	2	0	1	5	4	+1	6
Cyprus	3	1	0	2	4	6	-2	3
Azerbaijan	3	0	0	3	0	9	-9	0

19-09-2009

Ukraine	2 – 0	Cyprus

19-09-2009

Spain	3 - 0 (f: 2 – 0)	Azerbaijan

21-09-2009

Spain	4 – 1	Cyprus

21-09-2009

Azerbaijan	0 - 3 (f: 1 – 0)	Ukraine

24-09-2009

Ukraine	0 – 4	Spain

24-09-2009

Cyprus	3 - 0 (f: 0 – 8)	Azerbaijan

(f: Match forfeited)

== Group 11 ==
- Host country: Portugal

Team	Pld	W	D	L	GF	GA	GD	Pts
Switzerland	3	2	1	0	10	2	+8	7
Iceland	3	2	1	0	8	1	+7	7
Romania	3	1	0	2	2	11	-9	3
Portugal	3	0	0	3	2	8	-6	0

19-09-2009

Switzerland	5 – 0	Romania

19-09-2009

Portugal	0 – 2	Iceland

21-09-2009

Iceland	1 – 1	Switzerland

21-09-2009

Portugal	1 – 2	Romania

24-09-2009

Switzerland	4 – 1	Portugal

24-09-2009

Romania	0 – 5	Iceland
