= Lars Krogh Jeppesen =

Danish handball player (born 1979)

Lars Krogh Jeppsen
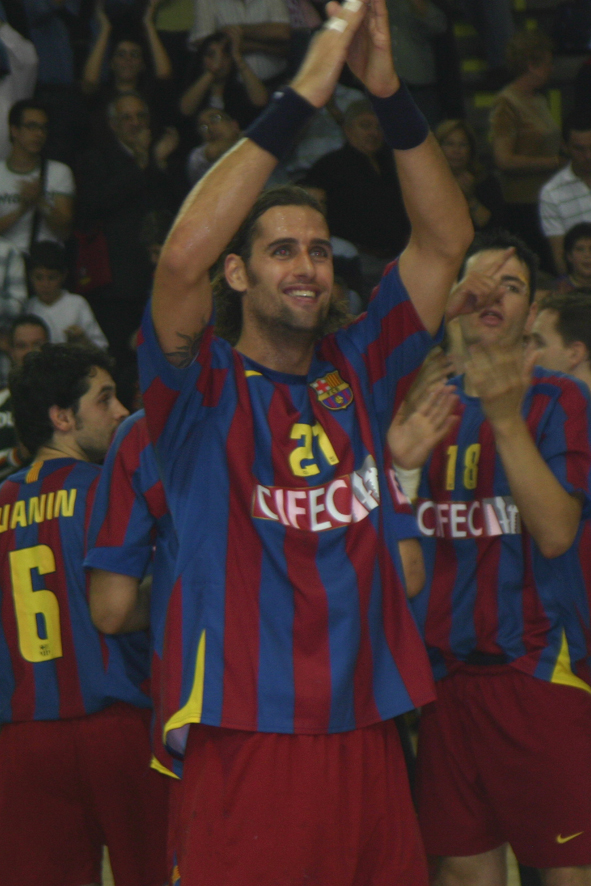

Personal information
- Full name: Lars Krogh Jeppesen
- Born: 5 March 1979 (age 47) Hvidovre, Denmark
- Height: 2.00 m (6 ft 7 in)

Sport
- Sport: Handball
- Position: Left back

Youth career
- Years: Team
- –: Avedøre IF

Senior clubs
- Years: Team
- 1987–1997: Avedøre IF
- 1997–2000: Team Helsinge
- 2000–2004: SG Flensburg-Handewitt
- 2004–2006: FC Barcelona
- 2006–2007: THW Kiel
- 2007–2010: Bjerringbro-Silkeborg
- 2010–2011: KIF Kolding
- 2011-2012: HC Fyn
- 2013-2014: KIF Kolding
National team
Years	Team	Apps	(Gls)
1998–2008	Denmark	123	(356)

Teams managed
- 2012-2014: KIF Kolding (assistant)
- 2014-2017: Team Esbjerg (assistant)
- 2017: SønderjyskE (assistant)
Medal record
European Championships
Gold medal – first place	2008 Norway
Bronze medal – third place	2002 Sweden
Bronze medal – third place	2004 Slovenia

Lars Krogh Jeppesen (born 5 March 1979) is a Danish former handball left back, coach and administrator, who played for KIF Kolding and previous Danish national team. He has won the 2008 European Men's Handball Championship along with two bronze medals in 2004 and 2002.

== Career ==
Lars Krogh Jeppesen started playing handball in Avedøre IF, before joining Team Helsinge, where he played for 3 years.

He joined German top club SG Flensburg-Handewitt in 2000, where he played for four years, scoring more than 500 goals in 138 games for the club. He won the Bundesliga once and the German Cup twice with the club. He then played two seasons for Spanish FC Barcelona. Here he won both the Liga ASOBAL and the EHF Champions League. In 2006 he returned to Germany and joined THW Kiel. With them he won the treble in his only season at the club.

He then returned to Denmark and joined Bjerringbro-Silkeborg. In 2010 he joined league rivals KIF Kolding. After a single season he joined HC Fyn in the 1st Division, where he acted as both player and sporting director.

After his playing career he became the sporting director at the club. In the summer of 2012 he became the assistant coach at KIF Kolding. In February 2013 he made a comeback as a played for KIF Kolding in the EHF Cup. He was however not cleared to play in the Danish league as he had not been registrered in time. He then retired once again, but returned for a third time in November 2013, when KIF Kolding had several key players injured.

After the 2013-14 season he retired once again, and left KIF Kolding. He then became the assistant coach at the Danish women's team Team Esbjerg. For the 2017/18 season he became the assistant coach at SønderjyskE Herrehåndbold. He decided to quit this position already in November 2017, due to disagreements with head coach Kasper Christensen on the sporting dispositions.

In July 2018 he entered the administration at KIF Kolding, but he left the position already in September the same year.

== Trophies ==
=== Club team ===
- Spanish Champion: 2006 FC Barcelona Handbol
- EHF Champions League: 2007 THW Kiel, 2005 FC Barcelona Handbol
- German Bundesliga: 2007 THW Kiel, 2004 SG Flensburg-Handewitt
- DHB-Cup: 2007 THW Kiel, 2004, 2003 SG Flensburg-Handewitt
- EHF Cup Winner's Cup: 2001 SG Flensburg-Handewitt

=== National team ===
- Junior World Champion: 1999
- Junior European Champion: 1998
- European Championship: Gold: 2008, bronze: 2004, 2002
