= John Boye Rasmussen =

Danish handball player (born 1982)

Personal information
- Full name: John Boye Rasmussen
- Nationality: Danish (Denmark)
- Born: 11 July 1982 (age 44) Måbjerg, Holstebro, Denmark
- Height: 194 cm (76 in)

Sport
- Sport: Handball
- Position: Goalkeeper

Senior clubs
- Years: Team
- –: Viborg HK
- -2008: AaB Håndbold
- 2008-2011: SønderjyskE Håndbold
- 2011-2012: HC Fyn
- 2012-2013: Skanderborg Håndbold
- 2013-2014: TMS Ringsted
National team
Years	Team	Apps	(Gls)
2003	Denmark	2	(0)

John Boye Rasmussen (born 11 July 1982) is a Danish handball player who plays as a goalkeeper. He has played two matches for the Danish national team, both in June 2003.

He has previously played for AaB Håndbold, Tvis KFUM, Skanderborg Håndbold,Viborg HK, HC Fyn and SønderjyskE Håndbold.

Until 2008 he was the second choice keeper at AaB. He joined SønderjyskE in 2008, when they were just promoted to the top league in Denmark.

In 2011 he joined HC Fyn in the Danish 1st division. He left the club a year later, when HC Fyn went bankrupt.

In 2012-13 he played a single season for Skanderborg Håndbold. In the 2013–2014 season he was relegated with TMS Ringsted.
