= HC Fyn =

Danish former handball club

HC-Fyn
- Full name: Handball Club Fyn
- Founded: 2011; 15 years ago
- Dissolved: 2012; 14 years ago
- Arena: Faaborghallerne, Odense Idrætshal
- League: 2011-12
- Danish 1st Division: 5th

Handball Club Fyn better known as HC-Fyn was a short lived Danish handball club, that was founded in the spring of 2011 as a union between Faaborg HK and HC Odense, two clubs on Funen, Denmark.

They played one single season in the Danish 1st Division. They went bankrupt at the end of their first season, as it became clear, they would not manage to get promoted to the top Danish division, Herrehåndboldligaen. They finished 5th, one point behind TMS Ringsted in 4th, which would have secured play-off matches to be promoted.

They played home matches in both Faaborg and Odense.

== The 2011-12 squad ==
No	Name	Nationality
1	Rajko Milosovic	(Serbia)
12	John Boye Rasmussen	(Denmark)
2	Jesper Chapion	(Denmark)
3	Jakob Larsen	(Greenland)
4	Kristian Olesen	(Denmark)
5	Lasse Larsen	(Denmark)
6	Morten Bjørnshauge	(Denmark)
7	Mathias Jensen	(Denmark)
8	Nicolaj Mehl	(Denmark)
9	Rokur Akralid	(Faroe Islands)
11	Mick Schubert	(Denmark)
13	Mark Schiøtte	(Denmark)
14	Christoffer Werenberg	(Denmark)
15	Martin Maag	(Denmark)
17	Thomas Pedersen	(Denmark)
21	Lars Krogh Jeppesen	(Denmark)
23	Lasse Folkmann	(Denmark)
33	Minik Dahl Høegh	(Greenland)
87	Kenny Ekman	(Sweden)
