= 2017–18 Danish Women's League =

Danish League
- Season: 2017–18
- Champions: Fortuna Hjørring
- Relegated: Vejle B Varde IF
- Champions League: Fortuna Hjørring; Brøndby
- Matches: 56
- Goals: 236 (4.21 per match)
- Top goalscorer: Nanna Christiansen (19 goals)
- Biggest home win: 10 goals: BRØ 10–0 VAR (24 Sep)
- Biggest away win: 5 goals: VEJ 0–5 HJØ (14 Aug); VAR 0–5 SKO (26 Aug)
- Highest scoring: 10 goals: BRØ 9–1 ODE (26 Aug)
- All statistics correct as of 12 June 2018.

The 2017–18 Danish League was the 46th season of the highest women's football league in Denmark and was contested by 8 teams. Brøndby IF were the defending champions.

== Main round ==
The teams play each other twice. Top six advance to the championship round.

Pos	Team	Pld	W	D	L	GF	GA	GD	Pts	Qualification
1	Fortuna Hjørring	14	13	0	1	58	7	+51	39	Championship round
2	Brøndby IF	14	11	2	1	52	13	+39	35	Championship round
3	Ballerup-Skovlunde Fodbold	14	9	0	5	27	24	+3	27	Championship round
4	KoldingQ	14	6	4	4	32	20	+12	22	Championship round
5	VSK Aarhus	14	7	1	6	30	29	+1	22	Championship round
6	Odense Q	14	2	1	11	19	39	−20	7	Championship round
7	Vejle B	14	1	4	9	11	37	−26	7	Qualification tournament
8	Varde IF	14	0	2	12	7	66	−59	2	Qualification tournament

Updated to match(es) played on 20 December 2017. Source: dbu.dk
Rules for classification: 1) Points; 2) Goal difference; 3) Number of goals scored; 4) Head-to-head points; 5) Head-to-head goal difference; 6) Head-to-head away goals scored

== Championship round ==
Teams play ten more matches. Points are reset, but bonus points are awarded for the placement in the main round. 10 points for first place, 8 points for second place and then 6, 4, 2 and 0.

Pos	Team	Pld	W	D	L	GF	GA	GD	Pts	Qualification or relegation
1	Fortuna Hjørring	9	8	0	1	26	6	+20	34	Qualification to Champions League
2	Brøndby	9	7	0	2	24	8	+16	29	Qualification to Champions League
3	KoldingQ	9	4	1	4	14	11	+3	17	
4	Ballerup-Skovlunde Fodbold	9	2	2	5	7	18	−11	14	
5	VSK Aarhus	9	3	1	5	9	13	−4	12	
6	Odense Q	9	1	0	8	6	30	−24	3	

Updated to match(es) played on 3 June 2018. Source: dbu
Rules for classification: 1) Points; 2) Goal difference; 3) Number of goals scored

== Qualification round ==
Teams play ten more matches, the first and second place are promoted to the league.

Pos	Team	Pld	W	D	L	GF	GA	GD	Pts	Qualification or relegation
1	FC Thy-Thisted Q	9	7	2	0	29	10	+19	23	Qualification to 2018-19 Elitedivisionen
2	B.93	9	6	1	2	29	10	+19	19	Qualification to 2018-19 Elitedivisionen
3	Vildbjerg SF	8	4	2	2	15	12	+3	14	
4	Greve Fodbold	9	4	1	4	22	17	+5	13	
5	Varde IF	9	2	0	7	13	29	−16	6	
6	Vejle B	8	0	0	8	5	31	−26	0	

Updated to match(es) played on 10 June 2018. Source: DBU
Rules for classification: 1) Points; 2) Goal difference; 3) Number of goals scored

== Top scorers ==
As of 3 June 2018.

=== Regular season ===
Rank	Player	Club	Goals
1	(Denmark) Signe Bruun	Fortuna Hjørring	14
2	(Denmark) Signe Andersen	VSK Aarhus	12
3	(Denmark) Stine Larsen	Brøndby IF	11
3	(Denmark) Amalie Thestrup	Ballerup-Skovlunde Fodbold	11
5	(Denmark) Nanna Christiansen	Brøndby IF	9
6	(Denmark) Lotte Troelsgaard	KoldingQ	8
7	(Brazil) Tamires	Fortuna Hjørring	7
7	(Finland) Olga Ahtinen	Brøndby IF	7
7	(Denmark) Maria Hovmark	Brøndby IF	7
10	(Denmark) Agnete Nielsen	Fortuna Hjørring	6
10	(Serbia) Nevena Damjanović	Fortuna Hjørring	6

=== Overall ===
Rank	Player	Club	Goals
1	(Denmark) Nanna Christiansen	Brøndby IF	19
2	(Denmark) Signe Bruun	Fortuna Hjørring	17
3	(Denmark) Amalie Thestrup	Ballerup-Skovlunde Fodbold	15
3	(Denmark) Signe Andersen	VSK Aarhus	15
5	(Denmark) Karoline Smidt Nielsen	Fortuna Hjørring	13
6	(Brazil) Tamires	Fortuna Hjørring	12
6	(Denmark) Lotte Troelsgaard	KoldingQ	12
8	(Denmark) Stine Larsen	Brøndby IF	11
9	(Finland) Olga Ahtinen	Brøndby IF	8
9	(Denmark) Signe Boysen	KoldingQ	8
9	(Serbia) Nevena Damjanović	Fortuna Hjørring	8
9	(Denmark) Mille Gejl Jensen	KoldingQ	8
9	(Denmark) Maria Hovmark	Brøndby IF	8
