= Pederson =

Pederson is a patronymic surname meaning "son of Peder".

== People with the surname Pederson ==
- Barry Pederson, Canadian retired player from National Hockey League
- Denis Pederson, Canadian player with the Eisbaren Berlin of the Deutsche Eishockey-Liga; former player National Hockey League
- Don Pederson, state senator, Nebraska Legislature
- Donald Pederson, American electrical engineer and one of the designers of SPICE
- Doug Pederson, American former football quarterback in the NFL
- Duane Pederson, coined the terms Jesus People and Jesus Movement
- Duane C. Pederson, bishop in the Evangelical Lutheran Church in America
- Eli Pederson, Wisconsin state assemblyman
- Jim Pederson (American football), American football player
- Jim Pederson (businessman and politician), American businessman; was Chairman of the Arizona Democratic Party
- Joc Pederson, American baseball player
- Josh Pederson (born 1997), American football player
- Lane Pederson (born 1997), Canadian ice hockey player
- Lena Pedersen (Pederson), Canadian politician, former member Legislative Assembly of Northwest Territories
- Mark Pederson, Canadian former player, National Hockey League
- Martin Pederson, Canadian politician, former leader of the Progressive Conservative Party of Saskatchewan
- Rachel Field, aka Rachel Lyman Field Pedersen, Newbery Medal–winning author
- Red Pedersen, aka Asgar Rye Pederson, Canadian politician, former Speaker of the Assembly, Northwest Territories
- Ron Pederson, Canadian comedian and actor
- Sally Pederson, former lieutenant governor, state of Iowa
- Steve Pederson, athletic director at the University of Nebraska-Lincoln
- Steve Pederson, American sound engineer
- Stu Pederson, American retired player, Los Angeles Dodgers
- Tom Pederson, American former player, National Hockey League
- Tommy Pederson, American musician, composer, trombonist
- Vernon R. Pederson, former Justice on the North Dakota Supreme Court

== Fictional characters ==
- Coach Pederson, played by David Paymer in The Sixth Man
