= Jakob Larsen (handballer) =

Greenlandic handballer and manager (born 1974)

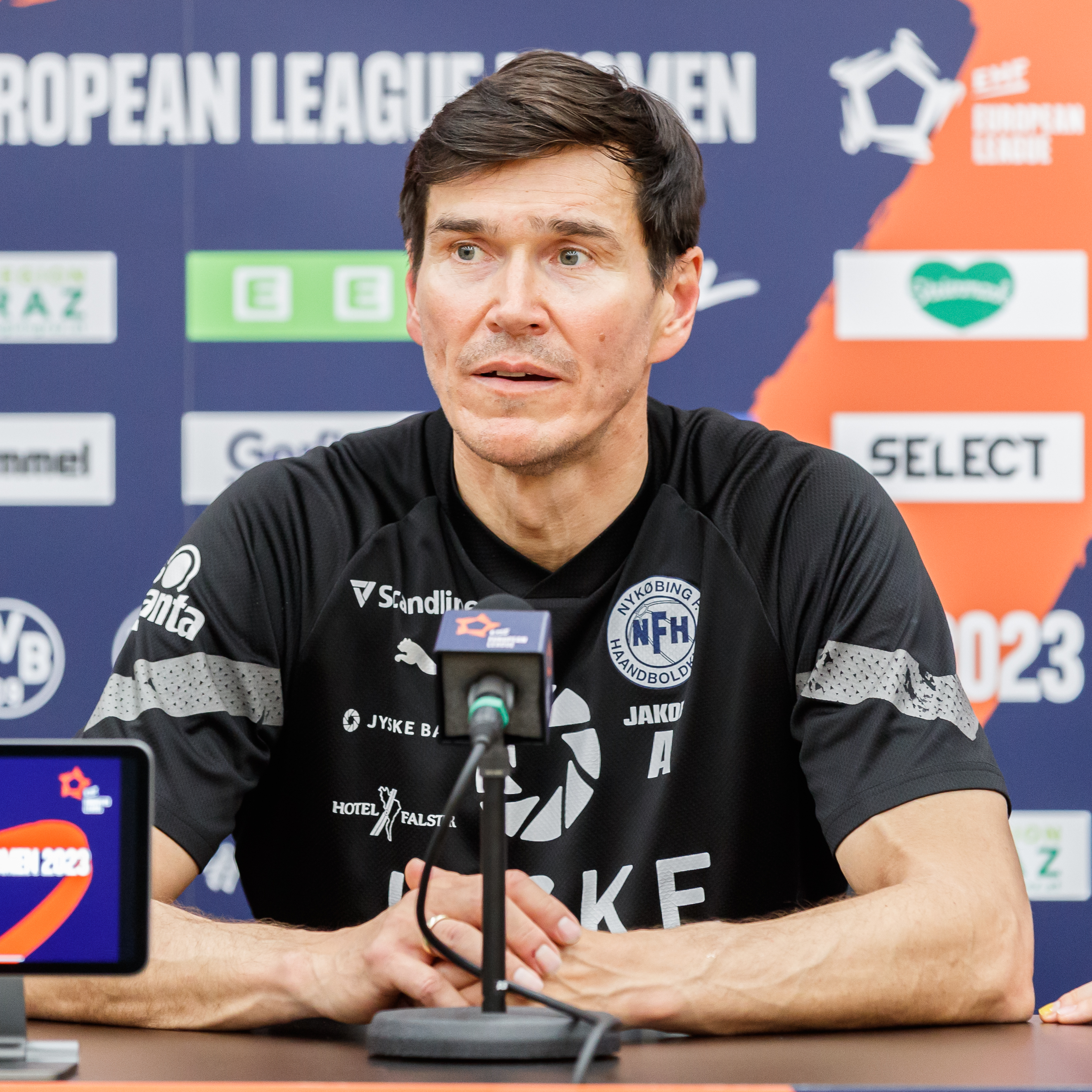

Personal information
- Full name: Jakob Rosbach Larsen
- Born: 4 July 1974 (age 52) Maniitsoq, Greenland, Kingdom of Denmark
- Height: 1.92 m (6 ft 4 in)

Sport
- Sport: Handball
- Position: Left back
- Current club: Nykøbing Falster Håndboldklub (Manager)

Senior clubs
- Years: Team
- 1994-1998: Nyborg GIF Håndbold
- 1998-2000: GOG
- 2001-2001: Otterup HK
- 2001: Zaragoza
- 2001-2004: GOG
- 2004-2006: Saint-Raphaël Var Handball
- 2006-2010: GOG
- 2010-2011: Faaborg HK
- 2011-2012: HC Fyn
National team
Years	Team	Apps	(Gls)
1997-2010	Greenland	87	(502)

Teams managed
- 2011: Odense HF
- 2011-2012: HC Odense & HC FYN
- 2012-2017: GOG
- 2017-: Nykøbing Falster

Jakob Rosbach Larsen (born 4 July 1974) is a Greenlandic/Danish retired handball player and current manager of the Danish club Nykøbing Falster Håndboldklub, where he has coached since 2017. He has previously been the manager of GOG Gudme. Larsen became Danish champion, as player, with GOG in 2007. He has a Master of Science degree in sport sciences from the University of Southern Denmark.

== Career ==
Larsen played for four years for the Danish club, Nyborg GIF Håndbold, moving to the Danish Handball League at GOG. He played to season with GOG before moving to Otterup HK in the 2000–2001 season. The Spanish side Zaragoza noticed Jakob Larsen during the 2001 World Championship in a match against Spain and Larsen was sold to Zaragoza in February 2001.

Larsen returned to Denmark that same year and joined a local club in Odense in order to combine handball and his studies. He later rejoined GOG. In 2004, he signed with the French side Saint-Raphaël Var Handball, playing for two seasons with the club. In 2006, he returned to GOG and played until the club's bankruptcy in 2010. In all, Larsen won two Danish championships with GOG. He played the following two season for Faaborg HK on an amateur contract before starting his career as a coach.

== Private life ==
He is married to fellow handball player Kamilla Larsen.

== Politics ==
In April 2025 he announced that his intention to run for the Danish Parliament on behalf of Radikale Venstre. His motivation was Donald Trump's announcement of his intention to annex Greenland. He ran in Fyn's Storkreds, where Radikale Venstre won a single seat. Larsen received 1,176 personal votes, which was not enough to win a seat. It instead went to Anastasia Milthers.
