= Mia Bak Pedersen =

Danish footballer (born 1980)

Personal information
- Date of birth: 8 October 1980 (age 46)
- Position: Defender

Team information
- Current team: Asker
- Number: 2

Senior career*
Years	Team	Apps	(Gls)
- IK Skovbakken
–1999	Mejrup GU		
2000–2002	Thisted FC		
–2006	Vejle B	13	
2007–2010	Asker		
- Stabæk

International career^{‡}
2006	Denmark	8	(0)
- * Club domestic league appearances and goals ‡ National team caps and goals as of 13 December 2007

Mia Bak Pedersen (born 8 October 1980) is a Danish football defender who has played for the Danish national team. In the 2007 and 2008 seasons she played in Norway for Asker SK. A serious injury in the off-season took her out of football for a prolonged period and in 2009 she moved back to Denmark to join the Danish club IK Skovbakken in Aarhus, playing in the elite 3F league and starting well with a goal on August 5 against Vejle.
