= Mads Pedersen (disambiguation) =

Mads Pedersen (born 1995) is a Danish cyclist.

Mads Pedersen may also refer to:

- Mads Pedersen (canoeist) (born 1996), Danish canoeist
- Mads Pedersen (footballer, born 1993), Danish footballer
- Mads Valentin, Danish footballer
- Mads Pedersen (badminton) (born 1990), Danish badminton player
