= 2010 UEFA Women's Under-19 Championship second qualifying round =

Football tournament qualification stage

The 2010 UEFA Women's Under-19 Championship Second qualifying round was the final qualifying round for the 2010 UEFA Women's Under-19 Championship and followed the 2010 UEFA Women's U-19 Championship First qualifying round. 23 teams came through that first round and were joined by top seed Germany.

The draw was made in Nyon on 11 November at 09.30CET. The 24 teams will be drawn into 6 groups of 4 teams, the winner of each group as well as the best runner-up will join hosts Macedonia in the finals next May and June.

== Qualified teams ==
- Republic of Ireland
- Finland
- Sweden
- Czech Republic
- Denmark
- Bosnia and Herzegovina
- Italy
- Scotland
- Germany (Bye)
- Netherlands
- Poland
- Norway
- England
- France
- Turkey
- Serbia
- Belgium
- Hungary
- Russia
- Austria
- Spain
- Ukraine
- Switzerland
- Iceland

== Matches ==
=== Group 1 ===
- Host country: Sweden

Team	Pld	W	D	L	GF	GA	GD	Pts
England	3	3	0	0	9	2	+7	9
Sweden	3	2	0	1	9	3	+6	6
Republic of Ireland	3	1	0	2	3	9	-6	3
Turkey	3	0	0	3	2	9	-7	0

27 March	Sweden	3 - 0	Turkey	Behrn Arena, Örebro
	Republic of Ireland	0 - 3	England	Behrn Arena, Örebro
29 March; Report	Republic of Ireland	3 - 2	Turkey; Kara 41'; Ertürk 79'	Tunavallen, Eskilstuna
	England	3 - 2	Sweden	Swedbank Park, Västerås
1 April	Sweden	4 - 0	Republic of Ireland	Tunavallen, Eskilstuna
	Turkey	0 - 3	England	Swedbank Park, Västerås

=== Group 2 ===
- Host country: Hungary

Team	Pld	W	D	L	GF	GA	GD	Pts
France	3	2	1	0	5	0	+5	7
Austria	3	1	2	0	4	2	+2	5
Switzerland	3	1	1	1	6	3	+3	4
Hungary	3	0	0	3	2	12	-10	0

27 March	Hungary	1 - 3	Austria	Városi, Tatabánya
	France	1 - 0	Switzerland	Globall Football Park, Telki
29 March	Switzerland	5 - 1	Hungary	Városi, Tatabánya
	France	0 - 0	Austria	Globall Football Park, Telki
1 April	Hungary	0 - 4	France	Városi, Tatabánya
	Austria	1 - 1	Switzerland	Globall Football Park, Telki

=== Group 3 ===
- Host country: Serbia

Team	Pld	W	D	L	GF	GA	GD	Pts
Germany	3	3	0	0	18	0	+18	9
Norway	3	2	0	1	10	4	+6	6
Poland	3	0	1	2	2	14	-12	1
Serbia	3	0	1	2	1	13	-12	1

27 March	Germany	7 - 0	Poland	FK Tavankut Stadium, Tavankut
	Norway	4 - 0	Serbia	Bačka Stadium, Subotica
29 March	Germany	8 - 0	Serbia	Bačka Stadium, Subotica
	Poland	1 - 6	Norway	City Stadium, Subotica
1 April	Norway	0 - 3	Germany	Bačka Stadium, Subotica
	Serbia	1 - 1	Poland	City Stadium, Subotica

=== Group 4 ===
- Host country: Russia

Team	Pld	W	D	L	GF	GA	GD	Pts
Spain	3	2	0	1	8	3	+5	6
Russia	3	2	0	1	7	1	+6	6
Czech Republic	3	1	0	2	2	12	-10	3
Iceland	3	1	0	2	4	5	-1	3

27 March	Spain	2 - 3	Iceland	Sputnik-Sport, Sochi
	Russia	6 - 0	Czech Republic	Sputnik-Sport, Sochi
29 March	Spain	5 - 0	Czech Republic	Sputnik-Sport, Sochi
	Iceland	0 - 1	Russia	Sputnik-Sport, Sochi
1 April	Russia	0 - 1	Spain	South-Sport, Sochi
	Czech Republic	2 - 1	Iceland	Sputnik-Sport, Sochi

=== Group 5 ===
- Host country: Netherlands

Team	Pld	W	D	L	GF	GA	GD	Pts
Netherlands	3	2	1	0	6	1	+5	7
Scotland	3	2	1	0	5	2	+3	7
Denmark	3	1	0	2	4	5	-1	3
Finland	3	0	0	3	2	9	-7	0

27 March	Netherlands	4 - 0	Finland	De Strokel, Harderwijk
	Denmark	1 - 2	Scotland	Oderbos, Apeldoorn
29 March	Denmark	2 - 1	Finland	Oderbos, Apeldoorn
	Scotland	0 - 0	Netherlands	De Strokel, Harderwijk
1 April	Netherlands	2 - 1	Denmark	Oderbos, Apeldoorn
	Finland	1 - 3	Scotland	De Strokel, Harderwijk

=== Group 6 ===
- Host country: Belgium

Team	Pld	W	D	L	GF	GA	GD	Pts
Italy	3	3	0	0	11	1	+10	9
Belgium	3	2	0	1	4	6	-2	6
Ukraine	3	1	0	2	7	5	+2	3
Bosnia and Herzegovina	3	0	0	3	1	11	-10	0

27 March	Italy	3 - 0	Ukraine	Gemeentelijk, Maasmechelen
	Belgium	2 - 0	Bosnia and Herzegovina	Mijnstadion, Beringen
29 March	Ukraine	1 - 2	Belgium	Eburons Dome, Tongeren
	Italy	3 - 1	Bosnia and Herzegovina	Mijnstadion, Beringen
1 April	Belgium	0 - 5	Italy	Gemeentelijk, Maasmechelen
	Bosnia and Herzegovina	0 - 6	Ukraine	Eburons Dome, Tongeren

== Ranking of group runners-up ==
Match against fourth placed team are not counting in this ranking.

Team	Pld	W	D	L	GF	GA	GD	Pts
Scotland	2	1	1	0	2	1	+1	4
Russia	2	1	0	1	6	1	+5	3
Sweden	2	1	0	1	6	3	+3	3
Norway	2	1	0	1	6	4	+2	3
Belgium	2	1	0	1	2	6	-4	3
Austria	2	0	2	0	1	1	+0	2
