= Christopher S. Pedersen =

Norwegian baritone (born 1986)

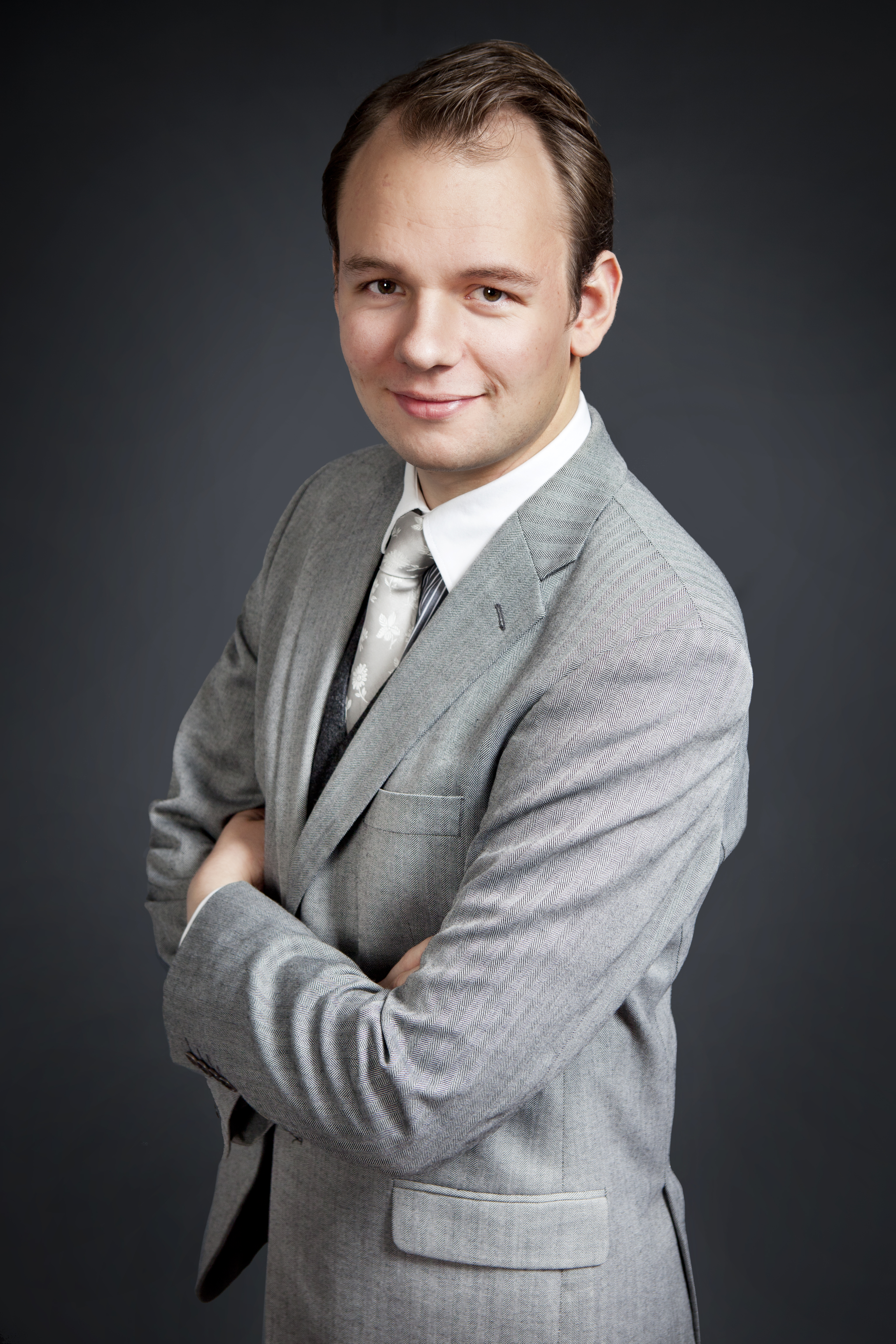
Christopher Pedersen Portrait

Christopher S. Pedersen (born 28 December 1986) is a Norwegian baritone.

He was born in the town of Skjeberg, Norway.

== Education ==
Pedersen started his musical education early, by singing in a church choir, and taking piano lessons from the age of eight. Pedersen has his bachelor's degree in performing arts from The Norwegian Academy of Music. Pedersen studied with professor Håkan Hagegård, professor Einar Steen-Nøkleberg, among others. Pedersen has taken many masterclasses abroad.

Christopher S. Pedersen has participated in countless concert appearances in Norway, and abroad. Pedersen has been given many scholarships, Sine Butenschøn scholarship for singers (2005, 2008, and 2009), Scholarship of The Norwegian Academy of Music (2008 and 2009), among others. He won first prize in the competition "Ungdommens Musikkmesterskap 2008".

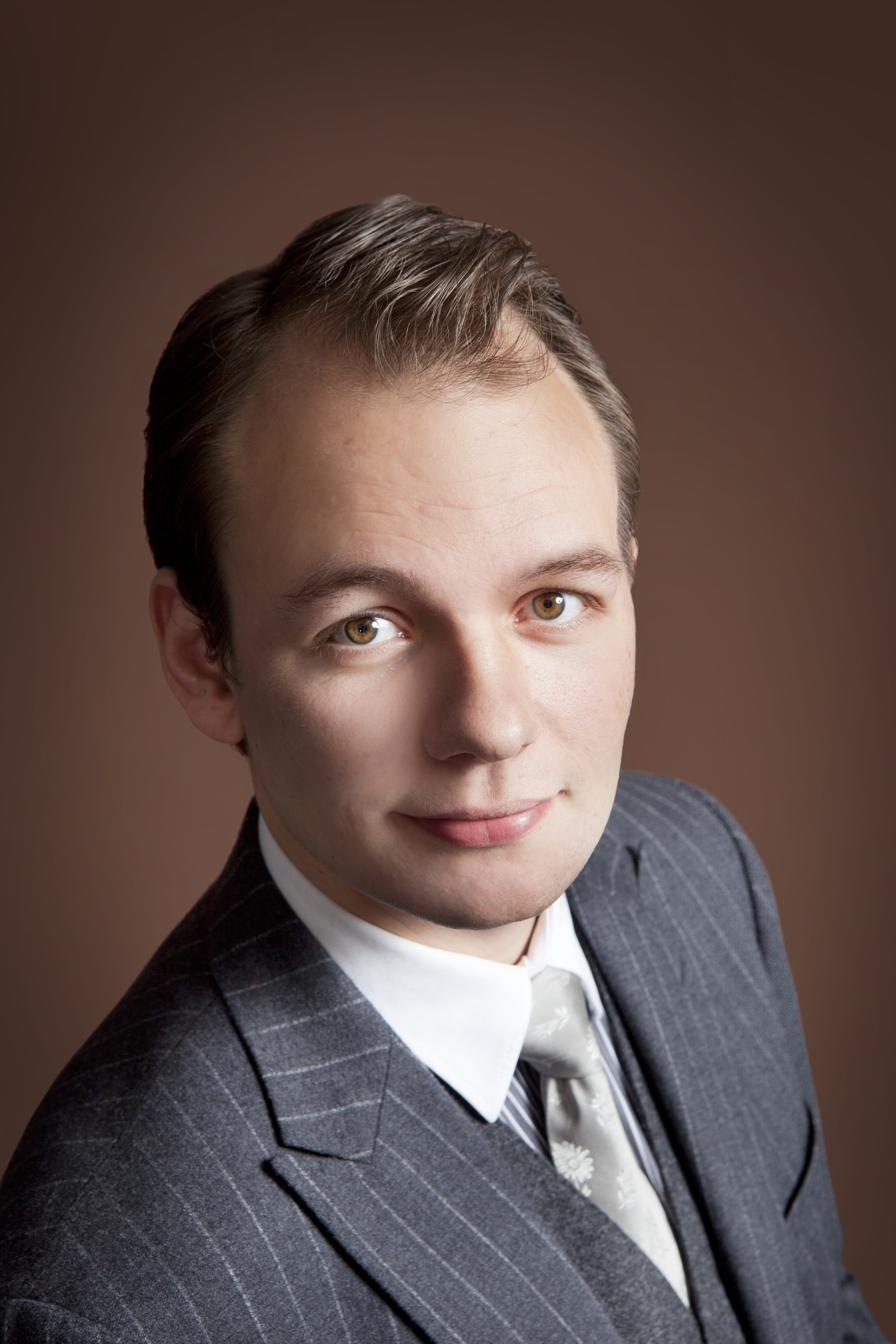
Christopher S. Pedersen

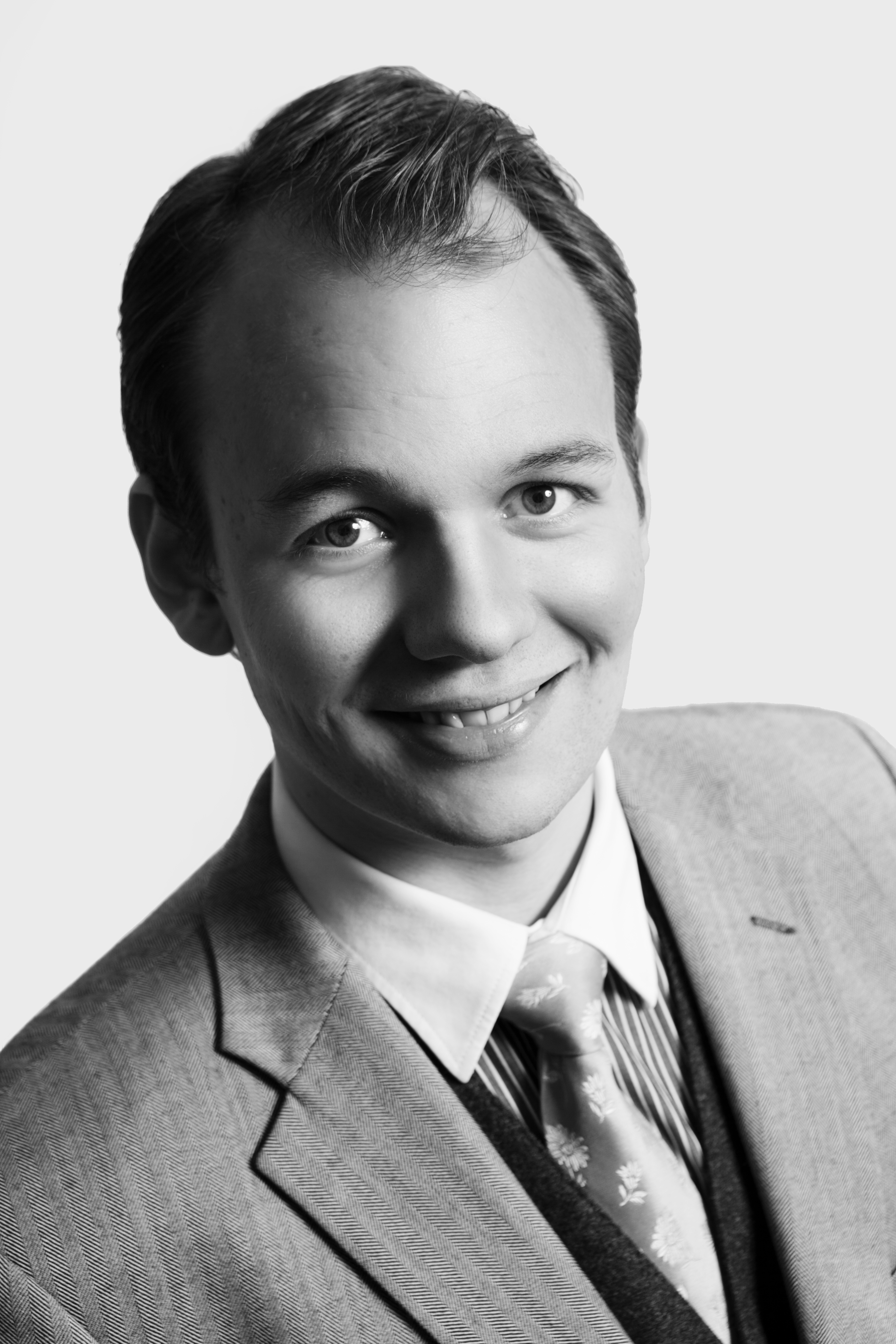
Christopher S. Pedersen

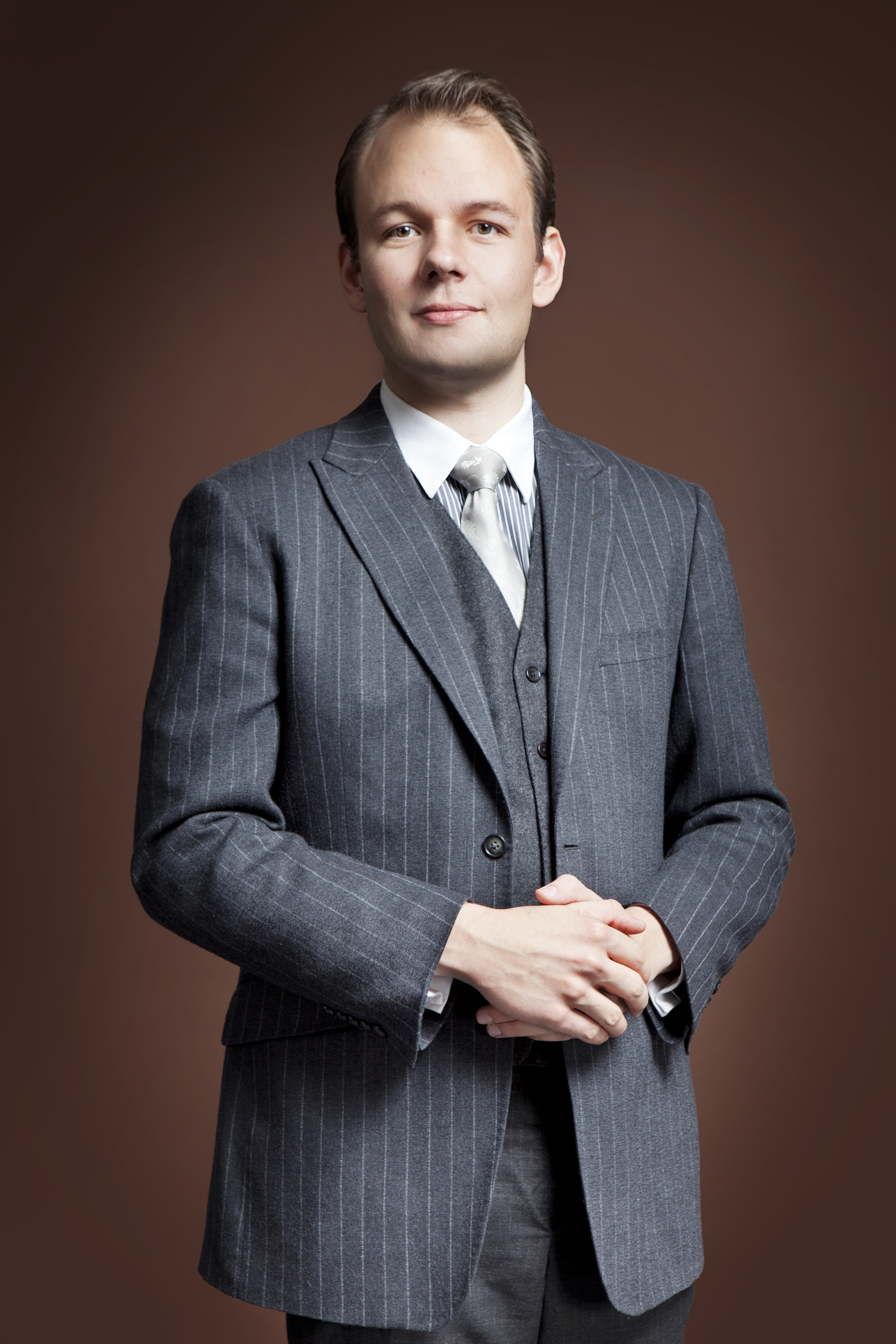
Christopher S. Pedersen

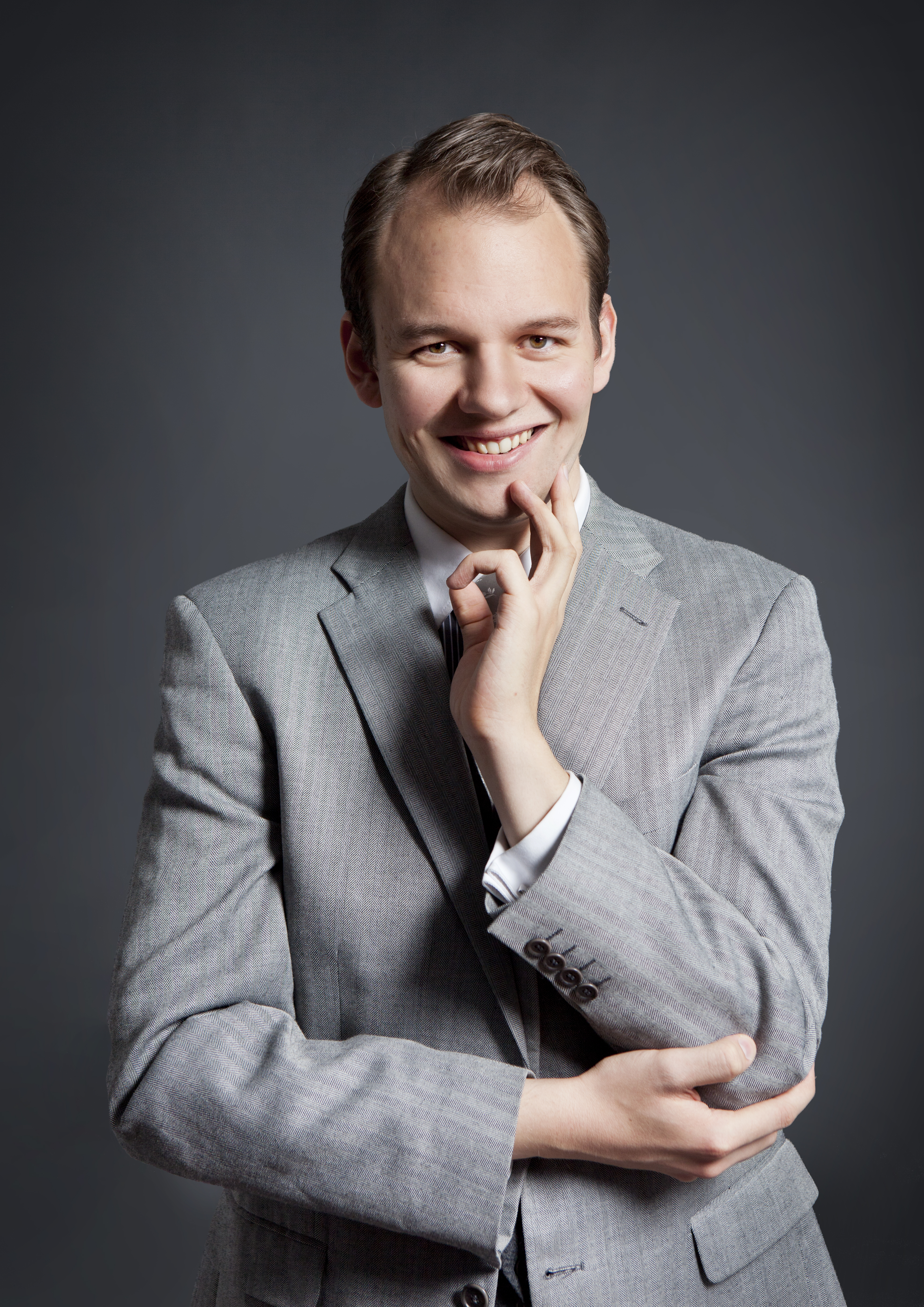
Christopher S. Pedersen

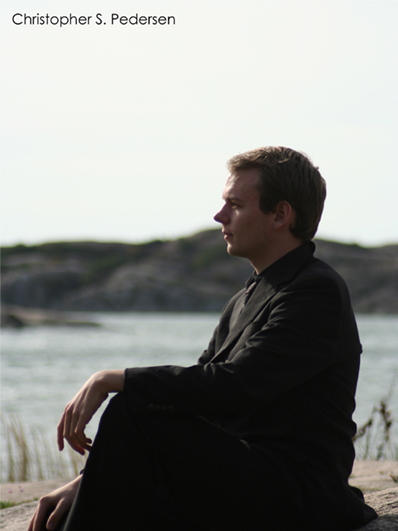
Christopher S. Pedersen - baritone

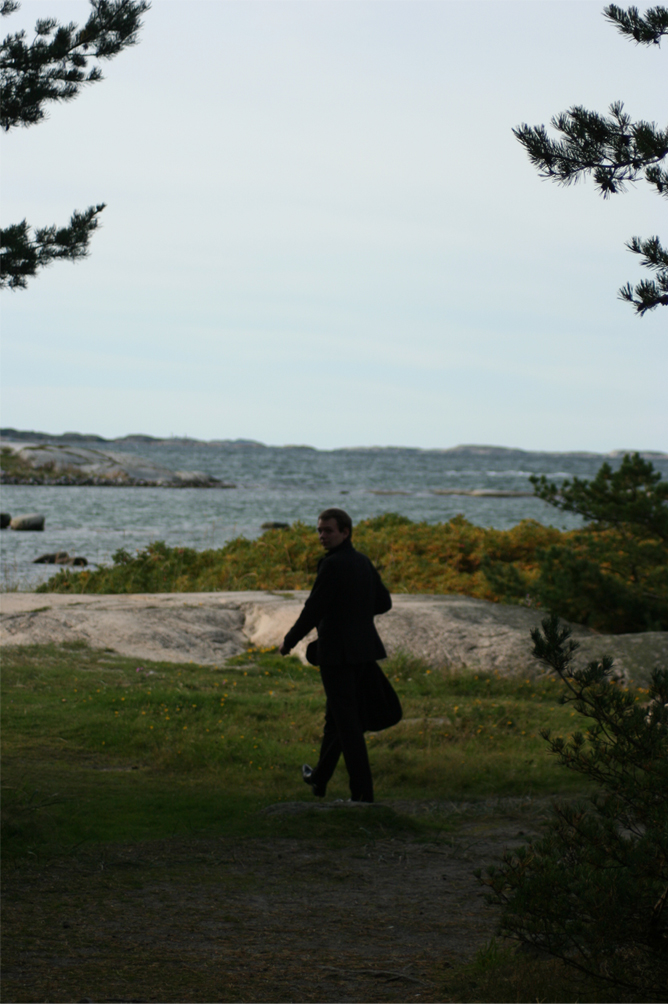
Christopher S. Pedersen - baritone
