= Thomas Garm Pedersen =

Danish professor in physics and nanotechnology

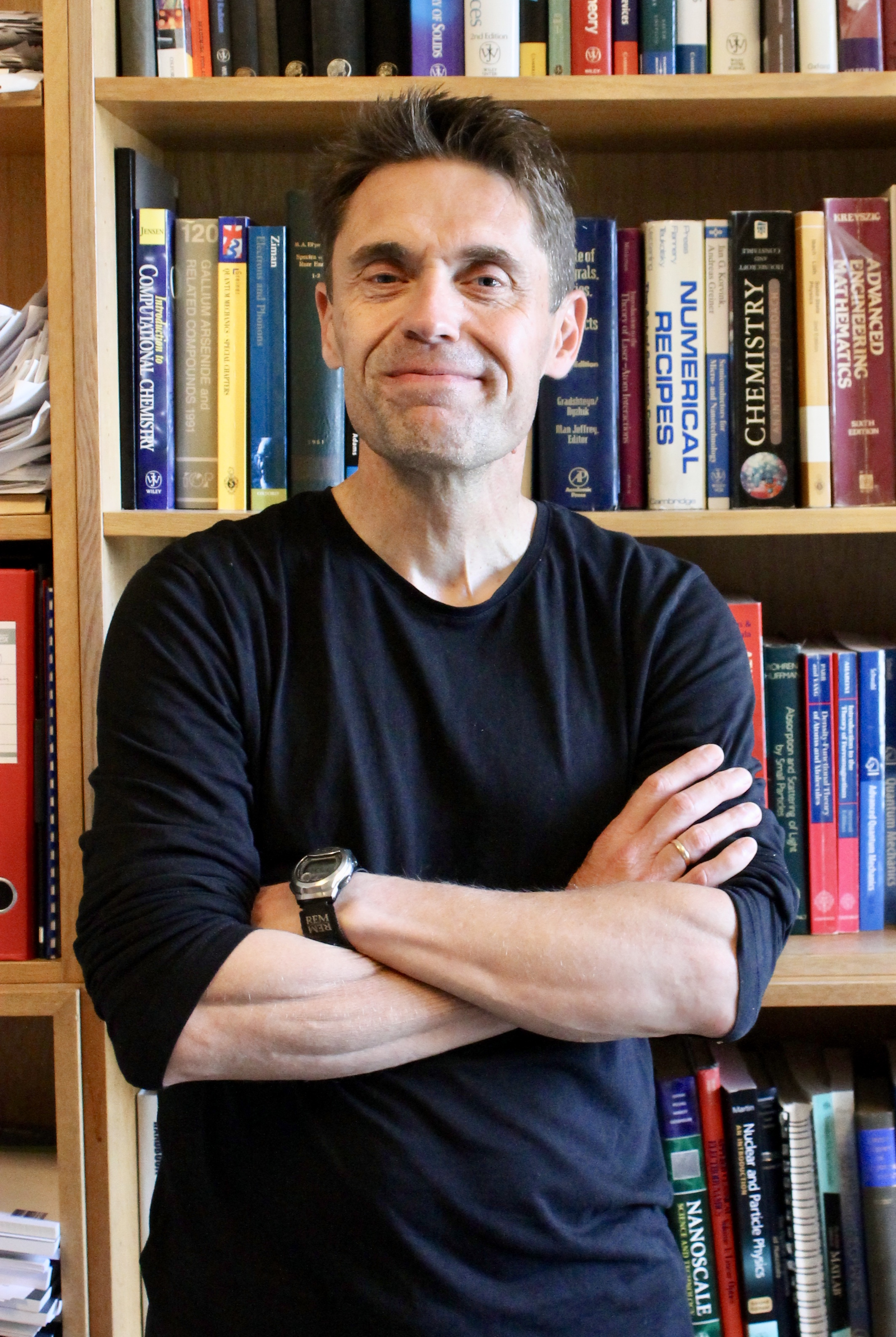
Thomas Garm Pedersen

Thomas Garm Pedersen is a Danish professor in physics and nanotechnology at Aalborg University. His research concerns the nanostructure of materials.

Pedersen's research has resulted in a large research project regarding the development of more efficient solar power cells with silicon-based materials and nanostructures.

In 2004, Pedersen received the Danish Optical Society Award for “Excellent contributions to modelling of optical and electronic phenomena”.

== Education ==
In 1993, Pedersen graduated with a M.Sc. in engineering with specialization in optics. Three years later, he received a PhD degree in physics. Since 1998, Pedersen has been employed at Aalborg, where he received a professorship in 2010.
