= Gitte Pedersen =

Danish footballer (born 1979)

Personal information
- Full name: Gitte Kousgaard Pedersen
- Date of birth: 22 January 1979 (age 47)
- Position: Midfielder

Youth career
- Ringive/Lindeballe IF
- Give Fremad

Senior career*
Years	Team	Apps	(Gls)
1996	Vejle B		
1997–2001	HSV		
2001	Everton		
2001–2005	Vejle B		
2006–	B.93 (Note: A coalition of Hellerup, B.93 and Skjold, later also Ryparken, which lasted two years. B.93 inherited the license following the coalition's dissolution.)		

International career
2000–2006	Denmark	3	(0)
- * Club domestic league appearances and goals

Gitte Kousgaard Pedersen (born 22 January 1979) is a Danish nurse and former international footballer who played as a midfielder. At club level she represented Vejle B, HSV, Everton, and B93/HIK/Skjold. Pedersen earned 3 caps with the Denmark national team.

== After football ==
Pedersen returned to Denmark to train as a nurse. In 2013, she was working in the accident & emergency department of Bispebjerg Hospital.

== Private life ==
While in a relationship with male footballer Thomas Gravesen, Pedersen played in Germany with HSV and England with Everton, corresponding with the men's teams Gravesen represented at the time.
