= Duane C. Pederson =

American Lutheran bishop (born 1955)

Duane C. Pederson (born December 28, 1955) was an American Lutheran bishop. He served as the Bishop of the Northwest Synod of Wisconsin of the Evangelical Lutheran Church in America. Prior to assuming the role of bishop on August 1, 2007, he served as pastor of congregations in Bozeman, Montana, and Chicago, Illinois, before he became senior pastor at First Lutheran Church in Eau Claire, Wisconsin.

== Biography ==
Born in Kalispell, Montana, on December 28, 1955, Pederson grew up on a farm and ranch. He attended Concordia College in Moorhead, Minnesota, where he majored in English and religion. He graduated from Luther Seminary with a Master of Divinity degree in 1981 and was ordained the same year. While serving Hope Lutheran Church in Bozeman, Montana, from 1981 to 1985, he received a Master of Education degree in counseling from Montana State University. He served Edison Park Lutheran Church in Chicago from 1985 to 1994 and earned a Doctor of Ministry degree at McCormick Theological Seminary in 1991. Pederson served First Lutheran Church in Eau Claire, Wisconsin, from 1994 to 2007.
