= Thor Pedersen =

Thor Pedersen may refer to:

- Thor Pedersen (politician) (born 1945), Danish politician
- Thor Pedersen (rower) (1924–2008), Norwegian Olympic rower
- Thor Pedersen (traveller) (born 1978), Danish traveller and adventurer
