= Sif Rykær =

Danish footballer

Personal information
- Full name: Sif Rykær
- Date of birth: 16 January 1988 (age 38)
- Place of birth: Haderslev, Denmark
- Height: 1.79 m (5 ft 10 in)
- Position: Midfielder

Youth career
- Haderslev FK

Senior career*
| Years | Team | Apps | (Gls) |
| 2008-2009 | Valur | 15 | (3) |
| 2009 | SønderjyskE | | |
| 2009–2017 | IK Skovbakken | | |
| 2017–2018 | VSK Aarhus | 24 | (6) |
| 2018–2021 | KoldingQ | 52 | (10) |

International career
| 2003-2005 | Denmark U17 | 17 | (2) |
| 2005-2007 | Denmark U19 | 28 | (4) |
| 2009 | Denmark U23 | 2 | (0) |
| 2011-2015 | Denmark | 6 | (0) |
- * Club domestic league appearances and goals

Sif Rykær (born 16 January 1988) is a Danish former footballer who played as a midfielder. Rykær represented A-Liga clubs Skovbakken, VSK and Kolding. She earned 6 caps for the Denmark women's national football team.

== Club career ==
She started playing for Haderslev FK, her youth years. She moved to Iceland in a young age, to join Valur. With the team, she won the Úrvalsdeild kvenna in 2008. She moved back to Denmark in the 2009, to play for IK Skovbakken, where she also won the Danish Cup in 2009. First in 2017, she moved to the league club VSK Aarhus, but moved to KoldingQ the following year.

== International career ==
She made her international debut on the Denmark national team on 2 March 2011, at the 2011 Algarve Cup. She hasn't been part of the National team, since 2015. Although she has represented the Denmark national under-23 team back in 2009 and has played several matches for both the youth and junior national teams.

She participated at the 2006 UEFA Women's Under-19 Championship in Switzerland and again in the 2007 UEFA Women's Under-19 Championship in Iceland.

== Honours ==
=== Club ===
KoldingQ

- Danish Cup
  - Winner: 2009

Valur

- Úrvalsdeild kvenna
  - Winner: 2008
