= Simona Koren =

Austrian footballer (born 1993)

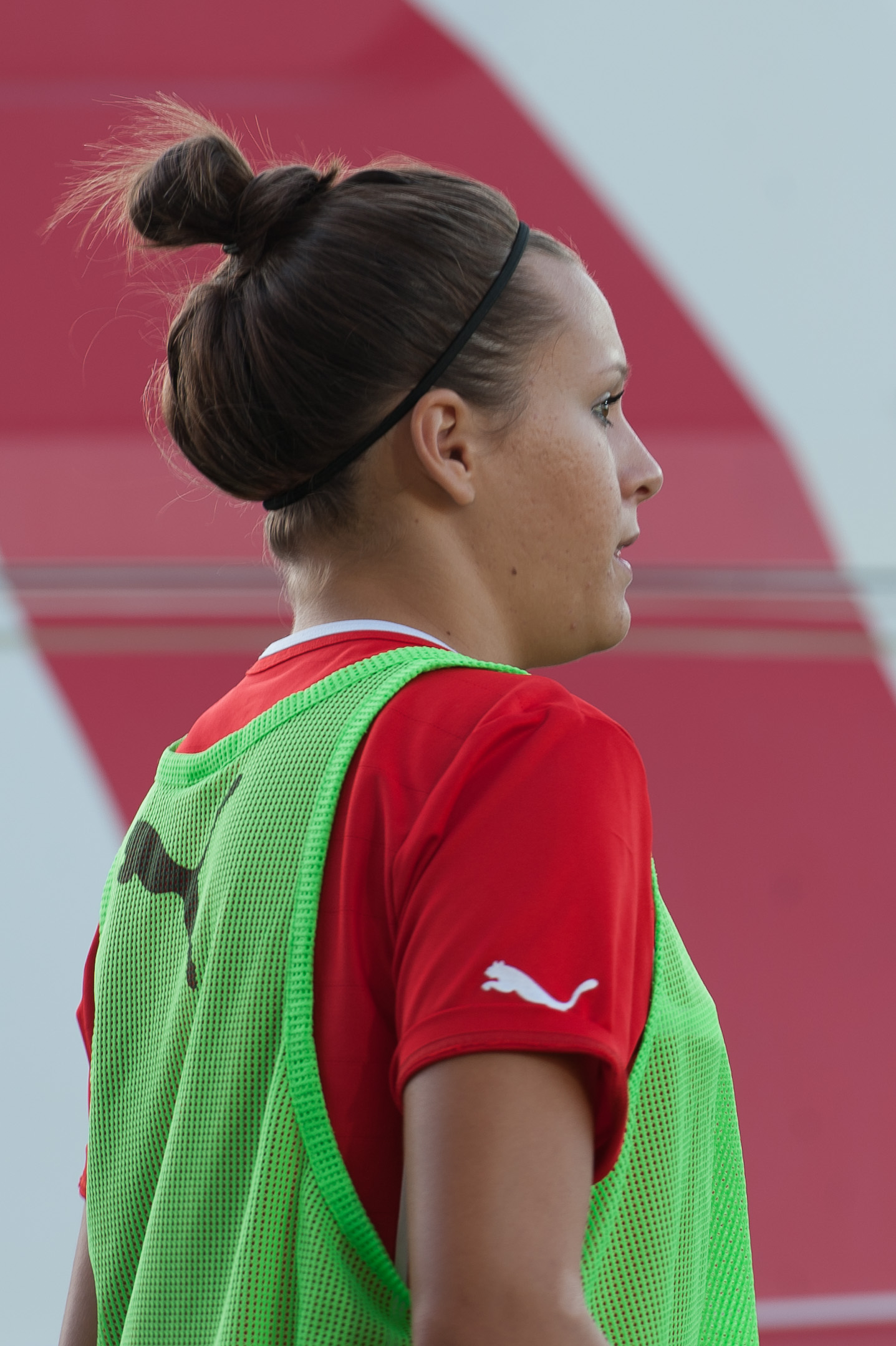
- Koren in 2014

Personal information
- Full name: Simona Koren
- Date of birth: 28 March 1993 (age 33)
- Place of birth: Graz, Austria
- Height: 1.65 m (5 ft 5 in)
- Position: Forward

Team information
- Current team: LSK Kvinner
- Number: 15

Youth career
- FC Stattegg

College career
Years	Team	Apps	(Gls)
2013–2016	ETSU Buccaneers		

Senior career*
Years	Team	Apps	(Gls)
2008–2011	FC Stattegg		
2011–2012	DFC LUV Graz		
2016	Medkila IL	6	(2)
2017	MSV Duisburg	3	(0)
2017–2018	Sunderland	5	(1)
2018–2019	Vaxjo	8	(2)
2020–	LSK Kvinner	0	(0)

International career^{‡}
2014–2017	Austria	9	(0)
- * Club domestic league appearances and goals as of 00:43, 9 December 2018 (UTC) ‡ National team caps and goals as of 00:43, 9 December 2018 (UTC)

Simona Koren (born 23 March 1993) is an Austrian footballer who plays as a forward for Norwegian club LSK Kvinner and the Austria national team.

== Career ==
She started her football career in Union Luv Graz in November 2004 when she was only 11 years old. She later went on to join FC Stattegg in June 2008 where she scored 32 goals in 32 games as 16 year old striker. 2009 season she followed up her impressive season before by scoring 20 goals in 40 games for FC Stattegg in the Austrian League. She became a highly rated talent in Austria. She was known for her speed, dribbling abilities and her finishing skills. In 2011 her abilities were noticed by DFC LUV Graz, where she continued and kept her scoring record.

In 2013 she moved to America to play college soccer for East Tennessee State Buccaneers. After an impressive spell with ETSU, she was picked by MSV Duisburg in 2017 for a short-term contract.

FA WSL team Sunderland signed a one-year contract with the Austrian international for the 2017–18 FA WSL season. Koren scored on her debut against Reading where they won the game 0–1. Unfortunately Sunderland Ladies had financial problems and were relegated from the Women's Super League regardless how they performed in the league.

Koren moved to Växjö DFF in the Damallsvenskan. Struggling with injuries, she did not manage to play a full season for Växjö. She suffered from shinsplints.

In 2020 she signed contract with LSK Kvinner in Norway.
