= John Pedersen =

John Pedersen or Pederson may refer to:

- John Pedersen (arms designer), arms designer who worked for Remington
- John Pederson (politician) (born 1968), American politician and member of the Minnesota State Senate
- John Pedersen (wrestler) (born 1948), Danish Olympic wrestler
- John Hugo Pedersen, Norwegian Olympic fencer
- John Pederson (coach), American football, skiing, and swimming coach
