= Helle Nielsen (footballer) =

Danish footballer (born 1982)

Personal information
- Date of birth: 17 February 1982 (age 44)
- Place of birth: Denmark
- Position: Midfielder

Youth career
- –2000: Grønbjerg IF

Senior career*
Years	Team	Apps	(Gls)
2001–	Vejle B	251	
2007–2013	SønderjyskE		

International career
2002–2006	Denmark	20	(1)
- * Club domestic league appearances and goals

Helle Nielsen (born 17 February 1982) is a Danish retired midfielder who played for Vejle BK, SønderjyskE Fodbold and the Denmark national team. Nielsen holds the record for most appearances at Vejle B as of 2017 with 251 caps.

== International career ==
Nielsen was part of the Danish team at the 2005 European Championships.
