= Vejle Boldklub (women) =

Danish football club from Vejle est. 1971

- Short name: Vejle B VB
- Founded: 1971; 55 years ago
- Ground: VB Park
- Coach: Finn Bendorf
- League: C-Liga
- 2025–26: Denmark Series, 1st of 7 (promoted)
- Website: VB Women
Home colours	Away colours

Vejle Boldklub (known as VB or Vejle B) is a women's association football club based in Vejle, Denmark. The team competes in the C-Liga, the third tier of the Danish Women's Football League.

== History ==
The club was founded in 1971 but conditions were not great, with the team having to organise training whenever the men's team were not using Vejle Stadium, as the women's team were headquartered at a school where facilities were inadequate. In 1986 the club merged with Vejle Boldklub, becoming the women's side of the club. VB played in the non-league Denmark Series from its inception, achieving promotion to the top tier for the first time from the 1988 season. The club stayed in the league until they were relegated in 1997, before winning promotion again and returning to the league from the 1998–99 season. In the 21st century the club has mostly played in the top flight, with some seasons in the second tier and a few in non-league as well. The club's hitherto biggest result was placing 4th in the top-flight in the 2003–04 and 2006–07 seasons. In 2026 Vejle returned to the league, achieving promotion to the C-Liga following an undefeated campaign. With 28 seasons in the top-flight, Vejle is a presence in the history of the A-Liga and aim for a return to the top division of the league.

== Players ==
As of 6 September 2026

Note: Flags indicate national team as defined under FIFA eligibility rules; some limited exceptions apply. Players may hold more than one non-FIFA nationality.

No.	Pos.	Nation	Player
1	GK	DEN	Vibeke Juhl Jensen
2	DF	DEN	Emilie Rong Petersen
3	DF	DEN	Nicoline Storgaard
4	DF	DEN	Alberte Andersen
5	DF	DEN	Alberte Sommer
6	MF	DEN	Frida Hougaard
7		DEN	Julie Ravn
8	MF	DEN	Caroline Cramer
9	MF	DEN	Camilla Bendorf
10	FW	DEN	Melanie Madsen
11	MF	DEN	Maria Lindvig
12		DEN	Frida Riis
13		DEN	Sofie Bülow

No.	Pos.	Nation	Player
14		DEN	Laura Jepsen
15	FW	MNE	Berina Čolak
16	DF	DEN	Louise Makne
17	MF	DEN	Verona Abdullahu
18	DF	DEN	Julie Kjerkegaard
100		DEN	Laura Nielsen
—	DF	DEN	Sille Bach
—	DF	DEN	Katrine Le Fevre
—	MF	DEN	Josefine Berg Mørch
—	MF	DEN	Trine Thisgaard
—	MF	DEN	Ida Lillebæk
—	DF	DEN	Cecilie Skelde
—		DEN	Josefine Grønfeldt

=== Player records ===
==== Caps ====
As of 2017

Incomplete

#	Player	Caps
1	Helle Nielsen	251
2	Charlotte Frisesdahl	245
3	Annette Thychosen	234
4	Mette Lind Jensen	223
5	Lisbeth Kølbæk	211
6	Gitte Pedersen	197
7	Kaja Skovgaard	191
8	Rikke Hansen	188
9	Eva Vester	168
10	Helle Hansen	165

== Seasons ==
As of the 2025–26 season

Key
(gold) Champions	Promotion
(silver) Silver	Relegation
(bronze) Bronze	Did not qualify

Incomplete

Season	Tier	#	W	D	L	F	A	Pts.	Cup
1988	1								
1989	1								
1990	1								
1991	1								
1992	1								
1993	1								
1994	1								
1995	1	5th of 8	10	2	16	56	97	32	
1996	1								
1996–97	1	8th of 8	5	2	21	48	102	17	
1997–98	2								
1998–99	2								
1999–00	1	7th of 8	3	3	20	26	99	12	
2000–01	1	7th of 8	5	6	17	37	73	21	
2001–02	1	6th of 8	7	4	17	32	54	25	
2002–03	1	6th of 8	4	3	14	18	43	15	
2003–04	1	4th of 8	13	1	7	43	39	40	
2004–05	1	5th of 8	8	4	9	40	42	28	
2005–06	1	7th of 8	4	4	13	25	48	16	
2006–07	1	4th of 8	11	2	8	54	44	35	
2007–08	1	7th of 10	7	4	7	26	42	25	
2008–09	1	7th of 10	5	4	9	25	35	19	
2009–10	1	7th of 10	4	4	10	22	46	16	
2010–11	1	6th of 10	6	2	10	19	58	20	
2011–12	1	7th of 10	5	3	10	26	46	18	
2012–13	1	9th of 10	2	3	13	13	53	9	
2013–14	2	2nd of 16	11	1	2	48	13	34	
2014–15	1	10th of 10	5	2	11	21	34	17	
2015–16	1	6th of 8	3	3	8	12	31	12	
2016–17	1	6th of 8	3	3	8	7	29	12	
2017–18	1	7th of 8	1	4	9	11	37	7	
2018–19	2	10th of 11							
2019–20	4 (Note: The Denmark Series was the non-league third tier of the Danish football league system until 2021, when a third tier within the Danish Women's Football League was created.)	6th of 8	3	4	6	21	34	13	
2020–21	4	3rd of 6	4	2	4	23	16	14	
2021–22	3	8th of 11	1	1	8	10	22	4	
2022–23	3	6th of 12	2	0	10	8	38	6	
2023–24	3	9th of 12	6	1	5	26	27	19	
2024–25	4	2nd of 8	10	1	3	38	13	31	
2025–26	4	1st of 7							
2026–27	3	Season in progress							

Sources: Statistics – Tipsbladet, Vejle Boldklub - Danish Football Association

== See also ==
- Vejle Boldklub, men's team
