= Thomas Pedersen (handballer) =

Danish handball player (born 1980)

Personal information
- Full name: Thomas Pedersen
- Nationality: Danish (Denmark)
- Born: 6 June 1980 (age 46)
- Height: 178 cm (70 in)

Sport
- Sport: Handball
- Position: Right Winger

Thomas Pedersen (born 6 June 1980) is a Danish former handballer, who played for Danish Handball League side Skjern Håndbold until 2010. He has previously played for league rivals GOG Svendborg and Nordsjælland Håndbold as well as HC Fyn in the First Division.

During his youth career, Pedersen played numerous matches for the Danish national youth teams.
