= Caroline La Villa =

French association football player (born 1992)

Personal information
- Date of birth: 12 February 1992 (age 34)
- Place of birth: Montpellier, France
- Height: 1.57 m (5 ft 2 in)
- Position: Defender

International career
Years	Team	Apps	(Gls)
2009–2011	France U19	18	(2)
2010	France U20	2	(0)
2014–2016	France U23	3	(0)

Caroline La Villa (born 12 February 1992) is a French footballer who plays as a defender for Lille.

== International career ==
La Villa has represented France at youth level.

== Honours ==
- 2010 UEFA Women's Under-19 Championship
