= The Liberalists – Freedom and Prosperity =

Defunct political party in Denmark

Liberalisterne – Frihed og Velstand
- Leader: Torben Mark Pedersen
- Founded: 2005
- Dissolved: 2008
- Succeeded by: Liberal Alliance
- Headquarters: Classensgade 63; 2100 København Ø
- Ideology: Classical liberalism

Website
- liberalisterne.dk (22 August 2006)

Liberalisterne – Frihed og Velstand (The Liberalists – Freedom and Prosperity) was a Danish political party based on classic liberalist ideology. Among its main goals were the introduction of a flat tax, opposition to recent anti-terror laws, and a general cut in public spending. The party was founded in 2005, and Torben Mark Pedersen served as party chairman. Its youth wing was named Liberalisternes Ungdom (Youth of the Liberalists).

The Liberalists sought to attract right-wing voters discontent with the policies of the current centre-right Venstre/Conservative coalition. The Liberalists claimed that the current cabinet had essentially carried on the policies of its Social Democratic predecessor, the cabinet of Poul Nyrup Rasmussen.

In August 2008 the party dissolved itself and all the members of the board joined the newly renamed Liberal Alliance.

== Naming dispute ==
In August 2005, the newly formed party approached the Danish Ministry of the Interior, asking for official registration as a political party. This application was ultimately rejected with the argument that the party name was too similar to Venstre's formal name: Venstre, Liberal Party of Denmark. This rejection led to accusations that the Minister of the Interior at the time, Lars Løkke Rasmussen, had a conflict of interest in the matter since Rasmussen himself was the deputy chairman of Venstre. The Liberalists subsequently filed a complaint to the Danish ombudsman, and in March 2006, Prime Minister Anders Fogh Rasmussen transferred the case to Justice Minister Lene Espersen (Conservative). In September 2006, she too rejected the original application citing the same argument as the Ministry of the Interior. In January 2007, the party received official registration from the Ministry of Justice after the party accepted adding "Freedom and Prosperity" to the party name to make the distinction from Venstre more obvious. The party stated that it would continue to use the shorter name and only apply the longer version in official contexts, e.g. on the ballot paper. Several opposition parties suggested that a multi-party commission be set up to decide future party name registrations and Lars Løkke Rasmussen agreed to this proposal, although Rasmussen suggested that this responsibility be transferred to an already existing parliamentary committee.
