= Lotte Troelsgaard =

Danish footballer (born 1988)

Personal information
- Full name: Lotte Troelsgaard Nielsen
- Date of birth: 15 August 1988 (age 38)
- Place of birth: Denmark
- Position: Midfielder

Youth career
- 1993–: Vejen SF

Senior career*
Years	Team	Apps	(Gls)
2008–2010	SønderjyskE		
2011–2012	OB		
2012–2019	KoldingQ		

International career
2005–200?	Denmark U19	10	(3)
2013–2015	Denmark	10	(4)
- * Club domestic league appearances and goals

Lotte Troelsgaard (born 15 August 1988) is a Danish former footballer who played as a midfielder. She has been a member of the Denmark women's national team. She is the twin sister of Sanne Troelsgaard.
