= Nevena Damjanović =

Serbian footballer (born 1993)

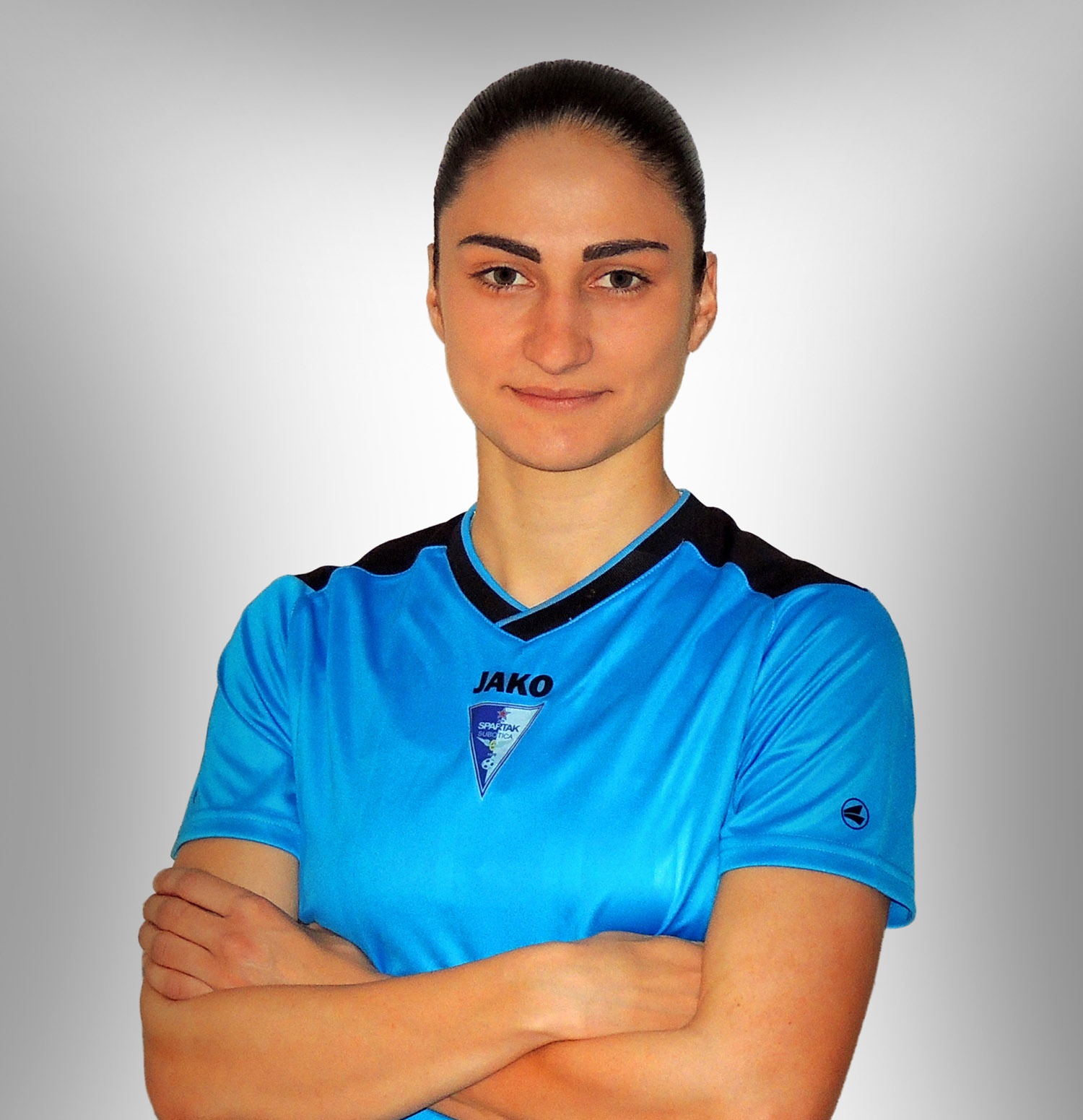

Personal information
- Date of birth: 12 April 1993 (age 33)
- Place of birth: Kragujevac, FR Yugoslavia
- Height: 5 ft 8 in (1.72 m)
- Position: Defender

Team information
- Current team: CSKA Moscow
- Number: 6

Youth career
- 2004–2010: Sušica

Senior career*
Years	Team	Apps	(Gls)
2010–2015	ŽFK Spartak Subotica		
2015–2018	Fortuna Hjørring	95	(9)
2018–2021	Sporting CP	0	(0)
2021–	CSKA Moscow	56	(21)

International career^{‡}
2013–	Serbia	53	(8)
- * Club domestic league appearances and goals ‡ National team caps and goals as of 18:23, 2 December 2023 (UTC)

Nevena Damjanović (Serbian Cyrillic: Невена Дамјановић; born 12 April 1993) is a Serbian football defender who plays for Russian Women's Football Championship club CSKA Moscow and the Serbian national team. She has previously played for Serbian Prva Ženska Liga club Spartak Subotica, Danish A-Liga club Fortuna Hjørring, and Portuguese Campeonato Nacional Feminino club Sporting CP.

== Club career ==
Damjanović started playing football at the age of 11, with the club Sušica from Kragujevac, and joined Serbian Prva Ženska Liga club Spartak Subotica 6 years later in 2010. She was vice-captain of the club. With the club, she won the league title five times and the Serbian Women's Cup four times.

After five seasons with Spartak Subotica, Damjanović moved to Danish club Fortuna Hjørring in July 2015. With the club she won the Elitedivisionen in 2015–16 and 2017–18 and also won the Danish Women's Cup in 2016, where she won the player of the tournament award.

In July 2018, Damjanović joined Portuguese club Sporting CP, signing a one-year contract with extra year option. Upon signing, she told the fans they can expect 100% from her every game. After scoring eight goals in 27 matches in her first season, she took up the option and signed for another year with the club in July 2019. Two months later, she was rewarded for her effort, being selected for the 2018–19 Campeonato Nacional Feminino best eleven. In June 2020, Damjanović said she was happy in Alvalade, loved representing Sporting CP as the captain, and signed a contract extension with the club. In June 2021, Damjanović was released by Sporting CP.

In July 2021, Damjanović joined Russian club CSKA Moscow. Two weeks after signing, she made her debut for the club in a 4–0 victory over Rubin Kazan. Damjanović led the team in games and was appointed captain of CSKA Moscow. In July 2024, after a successful period, scoring 27 goals in 86 matches, captaining the team, and winning the Russian Women's Cup twice, Damjanović signed a contract extension with the club.

== International career ==
Damjanović represented Serbia at youth level, captaining the team. She participated with the under-19 team in the 2012 UEFA Women's Under-19 Championship, held in Antalya, Turkey.

Damjanović is a leading player of the Serbian national team, having made over 86 appearances.

=== International goals ===
No.	Date	Venue	Opponent	Score	Result	Competition
1.	19 October 2017	Čukarički Stadium, Belgrade, Serbia	Israel	2–0	2–0	2019 FIFA Women's World Cup qualification
2.	24 November 2017	Voždovac Stadium, Belgrade, Serbia	Spain	1–1	1–1	2019 FIFA Women's World Cup qualification
3.	27 October 2020	Serbian FA Sports Center, Stara Pazova, Serbia	Bulgaria	1–0	2–1	Friendly
4.	26 October 2021	Stadion Metalac, Gornji Milanovac, Serbia	Turkey	2–0	2–0	2023 FIFA Women's World Cup qualification
5.	25 November 2021	Serbian FA Sports Center, Stara Pazova, Serbia	Bulgaria	2–0	2–0	2023 FIFA Women's World Cup qualification
6.	23 February 2022	Gürsel Aksel Stadium, İzmir, Turkey	Turkey	3–0	5–2	2023 FIFA Women's World Cup qualification
7.	7 April 2023	Serbian FA Sports Center, Stara Pazova, Serbia	Bosnia and Herzegovina	6–0	6–0	Friendly
8.	11 April 2023	Serbian FA Sports Center, Stara Pazova, Serbia	South Africa	3–0	3–2	Friendly
9.	22 September 2023	Stadion Miejski im. Kazimierza Deyny, Starogard Gdański, Poland	Ukraine	2–1	2–1	2023–24 UEFA Women's Nations League
10.	27 October 2025	Domžale Stadium, Radomlje, Slovenia	Slovenia	3–2	4–2	Friendly

== Style of play ==
Damjanović is an experienced player who leads the team forward from the centre of defence.

== Personal life ==
Damjanović was born in 1993 in the city Kragujevac in the Federal Republic of Yugoslavia. Before playing football, she trained in karate, winning domestic and international medals, including being champion of Serbia and Montenegro and reaching the black belt level.
