= Anger, Styria =

Anger
- Municipality
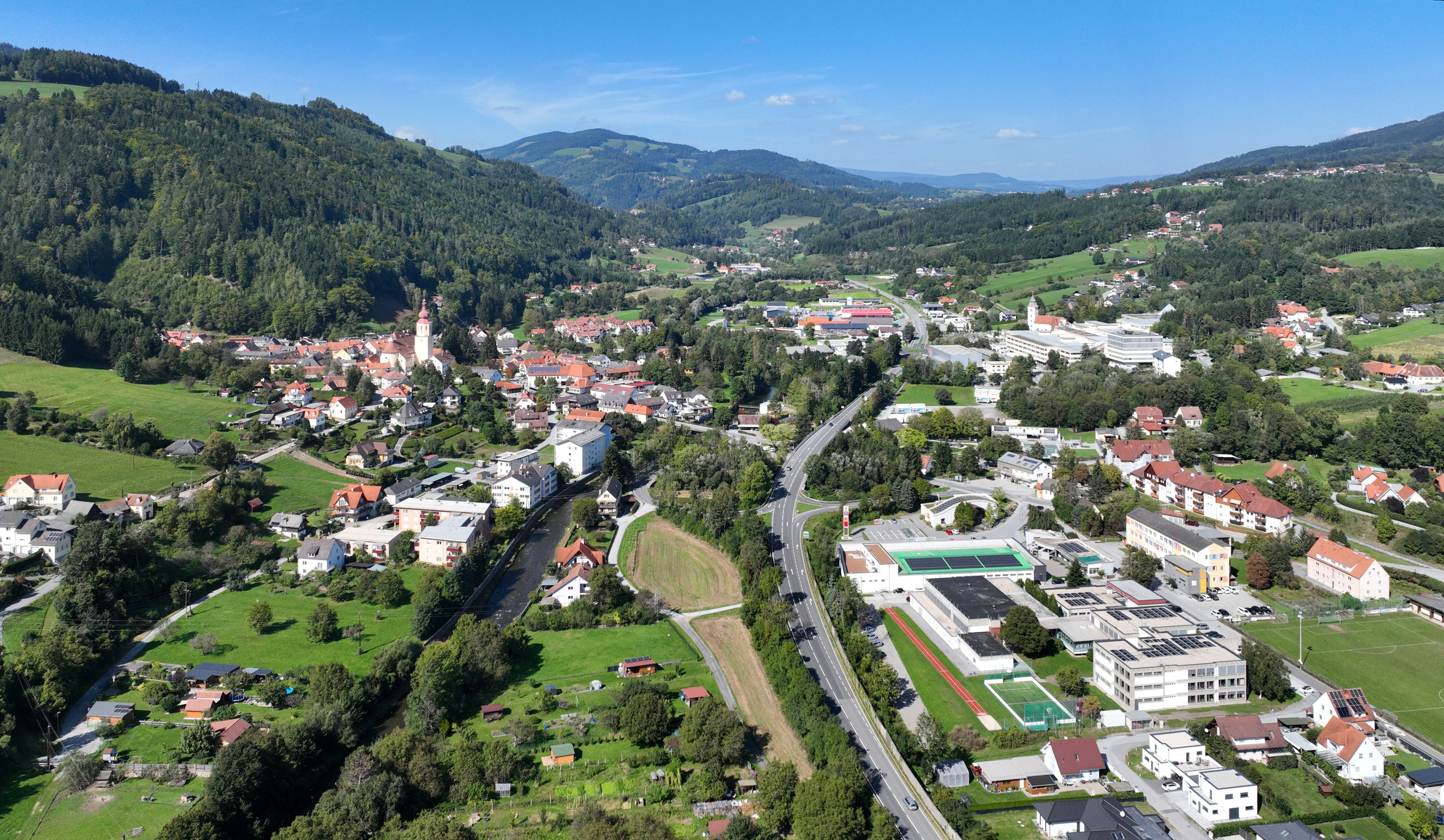
- Aerial view of Anger

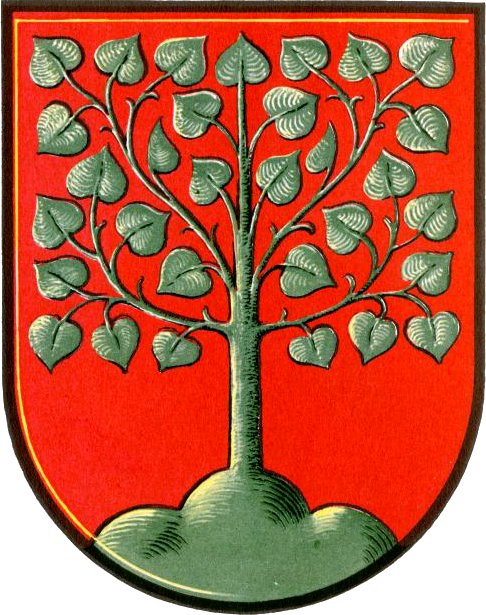
- Coat of arms

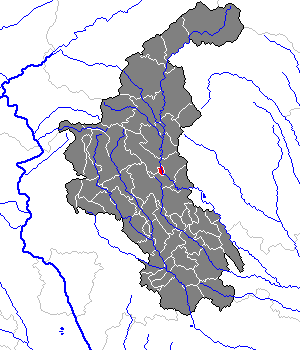
- Location within Weiz district

- Location within Austria
- Coordinates: 47°16′00″N 15°41′00″E
- Country: Austria
- State: Styria
- District: Weiz

Government
  - Mayor: Hubert Höfler (ÖVP)

Area
  - Total: 53.84 km^{2} (20.79 sq mi)
- Elevation: 479 m (1,572 ft)

Population (2018-01-01)
  - Total: 4,098
  - Density: 76.11/km^{2} (197.1/sq mi)
- Time zone: UTC+1 (CET)
  - Summer (DST): UTC+2 (CEST)
- Postal code: 8184
- Area code: 03175
- Vehicle registration: WZ
- Website: www.anger.st

Anger (Austrian German pronunciation: [ˈaŋɐ]) is a municipality in the district of Weiz in the Austrian state of Styria.

== Geography ==
Anger lies about 40 km (25 mi) northeast of Graz, 13 km (8.1 mi) northeast of Weiz, and 10 km (6.2 mi) south of Birkfeld.

== Culture ==
Anger is the location of the KOMM.ST art festival. Held annually since 2011, it brings international artists from various disciplines—including painters, robot builders, magicians, and musicians to the area. The festival features theater pieces written specifically for the event and performed in local inns, as well as large concerts and exhibitions by young regional artists in churches and other public spaces. In the historic Steinpaißhaus, a year-round cultural space called KOMM.ST LAB has been created.
