= List of Danish women's football champions =

The Danish women's football champions (Danish: Danmarksmester i kvindefodbold, plural: Danske mestre i kvindefodbold) are the annual winners of the A-Liga, the top tier of the Danish Women's Football Tournament (Danmarksturneringen i kvindefodbold, abbreviated as Kvinde-DM), the nationwide women's association football league in Denmark.

Since February 1972, women's football in Denmark has been governed by the Danish Football Association (DBU) and sanctioned by UEFA, with the national title contested through various competition formats. The inaugural official national women's football tournament took place in the 1973 season, featuring regional league winners advancing to a knockout stage, where the play-off winners were crowned champions. A nation league system was introduced in 1975 with west and east divisions, with the top team from each group progressing for a grand final. A single nationwide top division was established in 1981, awarding the championship to the team finishing atop the league standings by the end of the season.

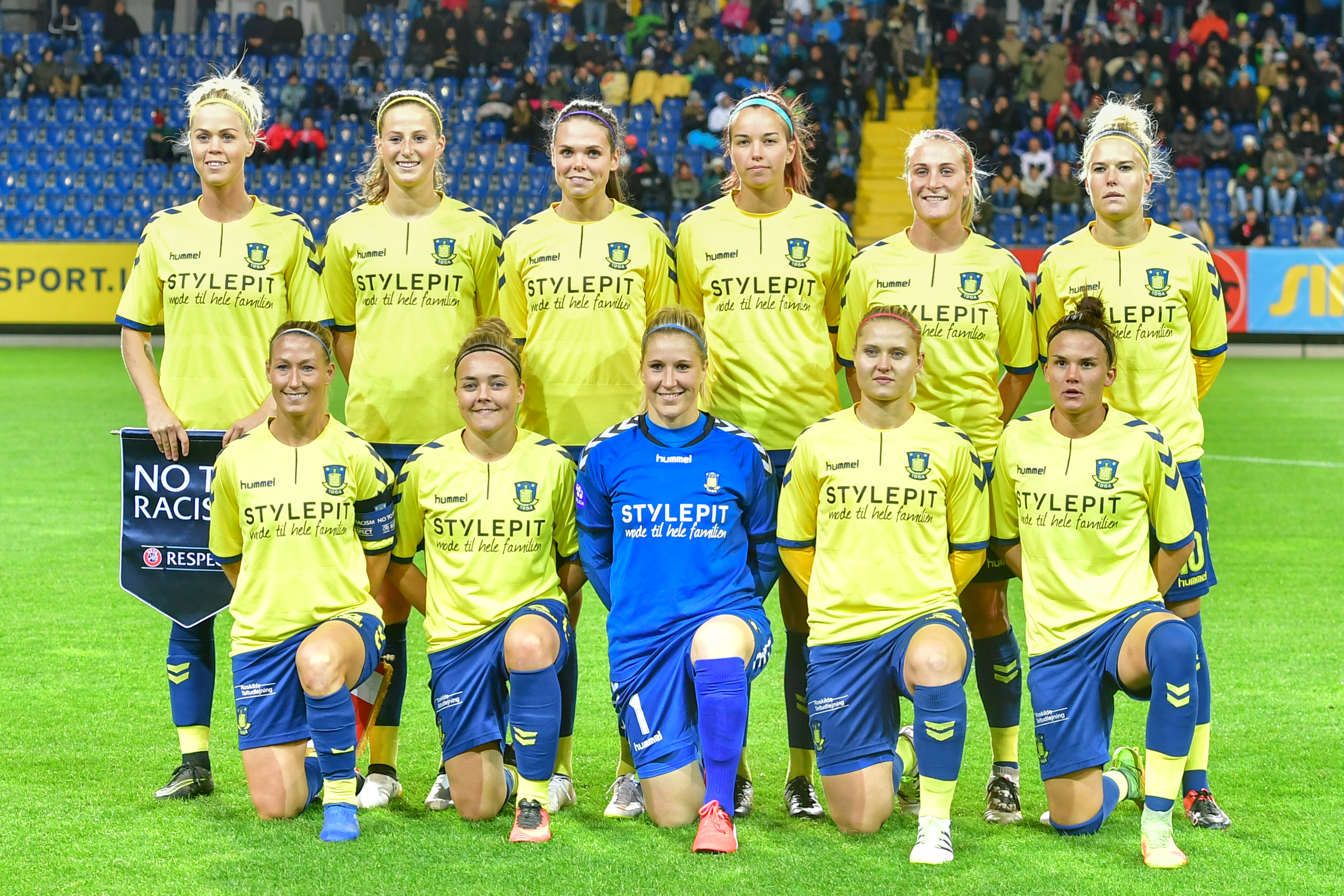
Brøndby has won the league a record 12 times, tied only with Fortuna Hjørring, and have won the double 8 times.

Fortuna Hjørring and Brøndby hold the record for most championships, having each secured the title on twelve occasions. Hjortshøj-Egaa IF enjoyed the longest winning streak in the 1980s, clinching six consecutive league championships from 1986 to 1992, a record matched only by Brøndby in the 2000s as they won the league title from 2002 to 2003 to 2007–08. In addition, Brøndby have achieved the double, winning both the league and the cup, a record eight times, three more than archrivals Fortuna Hjørring's five, and FC Nordsjælland and HB Køge's single double. The defending champions are HB Køge, winning the 2025–26 league title for the fourth time in the club's history.

Lis Westberg Pedersen made history as the first female head coach in 1980, guiding BK Femina to the eighth edition of the championship in her first season. Henriette Jensen of Hjortshøj-Egaa IF became the first woman to win a championship as both a footballer and head coach (Note: The coaching partnership at Hjortshøj-Egaa IF, comprising Henriette Jensen and Ove Sass Hansen, shared the roles and responsibilities of head and assistant coach evenly during their two winning seasons (1990 and 1991).) in 1990. With four national championship each, Peer Lisdorf (3x Brøndby IF, 1x HB Køge) and Peer Danefeld (2x B 1909, 1x Odense BK, 1x Brøndby IF) have won the most titles as head coach.

The weekly magazine Femina, regional organisations, various clubs, and the Dansk Kvinde Fodbold Union (DKFU) held national indoor and outdoor football tournaments for women's teams throughout the 1960s, with the last competitions continuing until early 1972. Neither the Danish FA (DBU) nor the National Olympic Committee and Sports Confederation of Denmark (DIF) recognise any women's national championship tournaments held before February 1972. Therefore, these indoor and outdoor senior women's records are not listed here.

== History ==
=== Inaugural championship playoffs ===
Denmark's first outdoor women's association football tournament took place in the spring of 1960, organised by weekly magazine Femina. The tournament featured thirty teams from across the country, playing by a modified set of rules created and revised by the magazine. The turnout exceeded expectations and the original format of an initial group stage followed by a knockout phase was changed to a knockout competition with an initial qualifying phase of three rounds and a championship play-off consisting of four teams, which was held on 17 July 1960 at Valby Idrætspark. BK Femina won the final against a team from Køge (Note: Weber (2004) mentions Køge BK as a participant in Femina's 1960 outdoor cup tournament, but the club does not recognise this. The women's application for admission to the club was denied, and a women's football department was not established until 1972.) by a score of 4–1. The followings years saw multiple indoor and outdoor football tournaments arranged, however women's football experienced decreasing interest in the mid-1960s. Despite this, there was an incremental establishing of new teams in the late 1960s, primarily within private companies, but not warranting a league formation – until 1970, the number of clubs with women's football teams did not exceed ten. BK Femina were the leading Danish women's team of the era, winning more or less every indoor and outdoor championship organised by the Dansk Kvinde Fodbold Union (DKFU). In the spring of 1971, the DKFU organised one last national outdoor football tournament with over 200 teams, where Skovlunde IF faced Billum IF in the championship final, securing a 3–0 victory.

Encouraged by both FIFA and UEFA, a successful vote at the meeting of the Board of Representatives of the Danish Football Association (DBU) on 27 February 1972 meant that women's football would now officially be acknowledged and competitions coordinated under the auspices of the national association. The first year was considered an adaptation year in which the regional football associations were to set up various committees to plan the tournaments. The qualifying regional tournaments could not meet the deadline of 1 November for having the regional champions ready for the national playoffs, and the national championship was not concluded in 1972.

The first official Danish women's national football championship was held the following year as a single-elimination tournament, where the winners of the six regional football associations' top-flight leagues, namely Nexø BK (Bornholm FA champions), BK Rødovre (Copenhagen FA champions), BK Stjernen (Funen FA champions), Ribe BK&GF (Jutland FA champions), B 1921 (Lolland-Falster FA champions) and Skovlunde IF (Zealand FA champions), faced each other for a spot in the inaugural one-legged championship final. Ribe BK&GF became the inaugural winners of the 1973 season by winning 1–0 against BK Stjernen Svendborg in the final held at Høje Bøge Stadium, Svendborg. Besides the championship trophy from the Danish FA, additional championship plaques from the National Olympic Committee and Sports Confederation of Denmark (DIF) were handed to each participant. This initial format lasted for another season (1974), with a repeat of the same finalists and winners. Regional qualifiers were implemented to decide, which twenty teams would take part in the new installation of the 1975 championship.

=== Formation of the Danish Tournament ===
A national league system with the Danish Women's Football Tournament (Danmarksturneringen i kvindefodbold, then Danmarksturneringen i damefodbold) at the top was incepted in 1975, consisting of a nationwide first division evenly divided geographically into two groups, clubs situated east and west of the Great Belt, establishing a promotion and relegation system with the regional top-flight leagues. The two winners of each group at the end of the regular season qualified for a spot in the two-legged championship final. The winners of the third edition were BK Femina, the then oldest existing pure women's association football club, who entered the final match by finishing at the top of the east group. BK Femina defeated Ribe BK&GF 1–0 away at Ribe Stadium and 4–0 at home at Gladsaxe Idrætspark. For six seasons (1973–1980), BK Femina regularly reached the final, securing the national title on three occasions, while Ribe BK&GF won the championship three times. For economic reasons, the Danish FA wanted to postpone the implementation of a single nationwide top-flight league, as the travelling expenses would double. After winning their fifth championship in 1979, the tournament rules declared that Ribe BK&GF could keep the original trophy permanently. In a profession dominated by male coaches, Lis Westberg Pedersen became the female head coach to manage a top-flight league team, guiding BK Femina to a championship title in the 1980 season.

In 1981, the first single national women's tier-one league, named Dame 1. division, began to play using a double round-robin system with no playoffs, where the top team at the end of the season was crowned the annual national champions of Danish women's football. B 1909 won the ninth edition as the first team based at Funen, finishing five points ahead of BK Femina. Throughout the 1980s and early 1990s, the women's football championship was dominated by Hjortshøj-Egaa IF and B 1909, who shared the national titles from 1981 to 1993, with Hjortshøj-Egaa IF securing six consecutive championships between 1986 and 1991. The format changed to a two-stage season in 1990, predating the two-stage format introduced to the Danish Superliga in the 1991–92 season. Teams played a single round-robin tournament in the first stage, after which points were awarded based on positions and goal scores were reset to zero. The top six and bottom six teams then playing another single round-robin for a total of 21 games to determine the champions and relegated clubs respectively. Henriette Jensen became the first woman to win the championship title as both a football player (defender) and a head coach, having already won five league titles (1982, 1984, 1986, 1987, and 1988) and one title as an assistant coach (1989) with the top-flight club Hjortshøj-Egaa IF, when she in January 1990 transitioned to a coaching position alongside Ove Sass Hansen,, securing the league title in her first and second year.

In 1993, a nationwide second division was formed, with the existing top-flight league rebranded as Danish Elite Division. The number of teams was reduced from twelve to eight, and the two-stage format underwent its first of several revisions. Fortuna Hjørring claimed the first double by winning the 1994–95 cup and 1995 league. The 1996 season lasted just six months as the tournament schedule was changed from spring-autumn to autumn-spring. Initially formed as an amateur tournament, professionalism was legalised and restricted to the Danmarksturneringen in July 1997, with the first semi-professional player contracts in Danish women's football being signed by Fortuna Hjørring and Frederiksberg BK. The first season (1997–98) as a semi-professional top-flight league was won by Hjortshøj-Egaa IF, whose roster consisted solely of players with amateur status. Fortuna Hjørring secured the 1998–99 title as the first semi-professional club. Odense BK won two seasons around the turn of the millennium in close competition with Hjortshøj-Egaa IF and Fortuna Hjørring, who finished in the top three for ten seasons.

Between 2001 and 2020, Danish women's football witnessed an uninterrupted power struggle between Fortuna Hjørring and Brøndby IF, with Brøndby IF clinching twelve league titles and finishing runners-up seven times, and the reserve for Fortuna Hjørring. Brøndby IF's dominance included six consecutive championships from 2002 to 2008. HB Køge broke the nineteen-year duopoly in the 2020–21 season by securing the championship in the final round of play, marking their first season at the highest level just three and a half years after continuous promotion from the fifth level. Prior to the 2016–17 season, the top-flight league formally changed its name to Kvindeligaen. The current challenge trophy, the ninth design in the history for the women's championship, was introduced in the 2023–24 season, replacing the previous trophy which became the permanent possession of HB Køge following their three consecutive championships (2020–2023).

== Champions ==
==== Danish Ladies Football Championship (1972–1974) ====
Season	Final Date	Champions (titles)	Result	Runners–up	Venue	Winning head coach(es)	Ref
1972	National playoffs not concluded						
1973	11 November 1973	Ribe (1)	1–0	BK Stjernen	Høje Bøge Stadium, Svendborg	(Denmark) Mogens Winther	
1974	16 November 1974	Ribe (2)	1–0	BK Stjernen	Ribe Stadium, Ribe	(Denmark) Mogens Winther	

==== Danish Ladies Football Tournament (1975–1980) ====
Season	Final Date	Champions (titles)	Result	Runners–up	Venue	Winning head coach(es)	Ref(s)
1975	2 November 1975	BK Femina (1)	4–0	Ribe	Ribe Stadium, Ribe	(Denmark) Erik Hansen	
1975	9 November 1975	BK Femina (1)	1–0	Ribe	Gladsaxe Idrætspark, Gladsaxe	(Denmark) Erik Hansen	
1976	31 October 1976	Ribe (3)	3–0	BK Femina	Ribe Stadium, Ribe	(Denmark) Jørgen Berg Nielsen	
1976	7 November 1976	Ribe (3)	0–0	BK Femina	Gladsaxe Idrætspark, Gladsaxe	(Denmark) Jørgen Berg Nielsen	
1977	30 October 1977	BK Femina (2)	1–0	Kolding BK	Mosevej Sportsplads, Kolding	(Denmark) Erik Hansen	
1977	6 November 1977	BK Femina (2)	1–0	Kolding BK	Gladsaxe Idrætspark, Gladsaxe	(Denmark) Erik Hansen	
1978	29 October 1978	Ribe (4)	3–0	BK Femina	Ribe Stadium, Ribe	(Denmark) Ronald Hansen	
1978	5 November 1978	Ribe (4)	0–2	BK Femina	Gladsaxe Idrætspark, Gladsaxe	(Denmark) Ronald Hansen	
1979	28 October 1979	Ribe (5)	2–0	BK Femina	Ribe Stadium, Ribe	(Denmark) Ronald Hansen	
1979	4 November 1979	Ribe (5)	0–1	BK Femina	Gladsaxe Idrætspark, Gladsaxe	(Denmark) Ronald Hansen	
1980	26 October 1980	BK Femina (3)	3–2	B 1909	Gladsaxe Idrætspark, Gladsaxe	(Denmark) Lis Westberg Pedersen	
1980	2 November 1980	BK Femina (3)	2–1	B 1909	B 1909's field at Vollsmose, Odense	(Denmark) Lis Westberg Pedersen	

==== Ladies 1st Division (1981–1992) ====
Season	Champions (titles)	Runners-up	Third place	Winning head coach(es)	Ref(s)
1981	B 1909 (1)	BK Femina	BK Rødovre	(Denmark) Henning Schmidt	
1982	Hjortshøj-Egaa IF (1)	B 1909	BK Rødovre	(Denmark) Ernst Beck	
1983	B 1909 (2)	Hjortshøj-Egaa IF	BK Rødovre	(Denmark) Henning Schmidt	
1984	Hjortshøj-Egaa IF (2)	B 1909	Fortuna Hjørring	(Denmark) Ernst Beck	
1985	B 1909 (3)	Fortuna Hjørring	Hjortshøj-Egaa IF	(Denmark) Mogens Rasmussen	
1986	Hjortshøj-Egaa IF (3)	B 1909	Fortuna Hjørring	(Denmark) Poul Højmose	
1987	Hjortshøj-Egaa IF (4)	Fortuna Hjørring	B 1909	(Denmark) Poul Højmose	
1988	Hjortshøj-Egaa IF (5)	Fortuna Hjørring	B 1909	(Denmark) Poul Højmose	
1989	Hjortshøj-Egaa IF (6)	Fortuna Hjørring	Varde IF	(Norway) Ragner Nielsen	
1990	Hjortshøj-Egaa IF (7)	B 1909	Fortuna Hjørring	(Denmark) Henriette Jensen (Denmark) Ove Sass Hansen	
1991	Hjortshøj-Egaa IF (8)	BK Rødovre	B 1909	(Denmark) Ove Sass Hansen (Denmark) Henriette Jensen	
1992	B 1909 (4)	Hjortshøj-Egaa IF	Fortuna Hjørring	(Denmark) Peer Danefeld	

==== The Elite Division (1993–2016) ====
Season	Champions (titles)	Runners-up	Third place	Winning head coach(es)	Ref(s)
1993	B 1909 (5)	Fortuna Hjørring	Hjortshøj-Egaa IF	(Denmark) Peer Danefeld	
1994	Fortuna Hjørring (1)	Hjortshøj-Egaa IF	BK Rødovre	(Denmark) Ove Christensen	
1995	Fortuna Hjørring (2)	Hjortshøj-Egaa IF	Odense BK	(Denmark) Ove Christensen (Note: Ove Christensen announced his immediate resignation on 28 June 1995. Fortuna Hjørring signed Steen B. Andersen as the club's new head coach on 8 July 1995.) (Denmark) Steen B. Andersen	
1996 (Note: The 1996 season in the top-flight league was only played during the spring, but a national champion was still crowned. It was a transitional season due to the schedule shifting from spring-autumn to autumn-spring.)	Fortuna Hjørring (3)	Hjortshøj-Egaa IF	BK Rødovre	(Denmark) Steen B. Andersen	
1996–97	Hjortshøj-Egaa IF (9)	Fortuna Hjørring	Odense BK	(Denmark) Jan Knudsen (Note: Jan Knudsen joined Hjortshøj-Egaa IF on 1 January 1996. On 22 October 1996, the present assistant coach Henriette K. Jensen was appointed as caretaker coach, replaced Knudsen. On 6 December 1996, Troels Bech was announced as the top-flight club's new head coach, effective immediately.) (Denmark) Henriette K. Jensen (Denmark) Troels Bech	
1997–98	Hjortshøj-Egaa IF (10)	Fortuna Hjørring	Odense BK	(Denmark) Troels Bech (Note: Troels Bech was purchased out of his contract with Fortuna Hjørring to join AC Horsens after New Year's Eve, with Hugo Eskesen becoming the new first-team coach on 1 January 1998.) (Denmark) Hugo Eskesen	
1998–99	Fortuna Hjørring (4)	Hjortshøj-Egaa IF	Odense BK	(Denmark) Jacob Nørgaard	
1999–2000	Odense BK (1)	Fortuna Hjørring	Hjortshøj-Egaa IF	(Denmark) Erling Thomsen (Note: Erling Thomsen left Odense BK on 31 October 1999. Jan Knudsen was appointed as the new head coach.) (Denmark) Jan Knudsen	
2000–01	Odense BK (2)	Fortuna Hjørring	Hjortshøj-Egaa IF	(Denmark) Peer Danefeld	
2001–02	Fortuna Hjørring (5)	Brøndby IF	IK Skovbakken (Note: In January 2002, halfway through the 2001–02 season, Hjortshøj-Egaa IF's two elite women's squads, playing in the national and regional top-flight leagues, merged with IK Skovbakken's women's youth department for economic reasons, transferring the league licenses from Hjortshøj-Egaa IF to IK Skovbakken Kvindefodbold. In July 2017, the women's football department of IK Skovbakken Fodbold merged with the women's football departments of Vejlby IK, becoming part of VSK Aarhus. The founding clubs' association football departments ceased to exist. In 2020, the club merged with IF Lyseng to form AGF; Lyseng departed in 2024.)	(Denmark) Jens Overgaard (Note: On 1 January 2002, Steen Refsgaard replaced Jens Overgaard as the new head coach for Fortuna Hjørring.) (Denmark) Steen Refsgaard (Note: Jacob Nørgaard only acted as interim coach during the 2002 cup final, as Steen Refsgaard was unable to attend the match and did not coach any league games.)	
2002–03	Brøndby IF (1)	Fortuna Hjørring	Odense BK	(Denmark) Peder Siggaard	
2003–04	Brøndby IF (2)	Fortuna Hjørring	IK Skovbakken	(Denmark) Peder Siggaard (Note: Peder Siggaard was signed as head coach during the fall part of the 2003–04 season, until Peer Danefeld was hired as the replacement starting from 1 January 2004.) (Denmark) Peer Danefeld	
2004–05	Brøndby IF (3)	Fortuna Hjørring	IK Skovbakken	(Denmark) Peer Danefeld (Note: Peer Danefeld announced his resignation in mid-October 2004 and was officially replaced by Kenneth Heiner-Møller (previously Heiner Christiansen) on 1 January 2005.) (Denmark) Kenneth Heiner-Møller	
2005–06	Brøndby IF (4)	Fortuna Hjørring	Skovlunde IF	(Denmark) Kenneth Heiner-Møller (Note: Henrik Jensen was appointed as the new head coach beginning 1 January 2005, replacing Kenneth Heiner-Møller (before his marriage, he used the last name at birth, Heiner Christiansen).) (Denmark) Henrik Jensen	
2006–07	Brøndby IF (5)	Fortuna Hjørring	Skovlunde IF	(Denmark) Henrik Jensen	
2007–08	Brøndby IF (6)	Fortuna Hjørring	Skovlunde IF	(Denmark) Henrik Jensen	
2008–09	Fortuna Hjørring (6)	Brøndby IF	IK Skovbakken	(Denmark) Flemming Nielsen	
2009–10	Fortuna Hjørring (7)	Brøndby IF	IK Skovbakken	(Denmark) Flemming Nielsen	
2010–11	Brøndby IF (7)	Fortuna Hjørring	IK Skovbakken	(Denmark) Peer Lisdorf	
2011–12	Brøndby IF (8)	Fortuna Hjørring	IK Skovbakken	(Denmark) Peer Lisdorf	
2012–13	Brøndby IF (9)	Fortuna Hjørring	Odense BK	(Denmark) Peer Lisdorf	
2013–14	Fortuna Hjørring (8)	Brøndby IF	Odense BK	(Denmark) Brian Sørensen	
2014–15	Brøndby IF (10)	Fortuna Hjørring	KoldingQ	(Denmark) Peer Lisdorf (Note: Peer Lisdorf announced his resignation on 21 December 2014, effective 31 December, and Per Nielsen was assigned as the new head coach starting from 1 January 2015.) (Denmark) Per Nielsen	
2015–16	Fortuna Hjørring (9)	Brøndby IF	KoldingQ	(Denmark) Brian Sørensen	

==== The Women's League (2016–2025) ====
Season	Champions (titles)	Runners-up	Third place	Winning head coach(es)	Ref(s)
2016–17	Brøndby IF (11)	Fortuna Hjørring	IK Skovbakken	(Denmark) Per Nielsen	
2017–18	Fortuna Hjørring (10)	Brøndby IF	KoldingQ	(Denmark) Brian Sørensen (Note: Brian Sørensen announced his resignation on 14 January 2018, and Carrie Kveton was assigned as the new head coach on 15 January 2018.) (United States) Carrie Kveton	
2018–19	Brøndby IF (12)	Fortuna Hjørring	VSK Aarhus	(Denmark) Per Nielsen	
2019–20	Fortuna Hjørring (11)	Brøndby IF	FC Nordsjælland (Note: In February 2020, the administration of the senior women's squad of Farum BK was handed over to the club's professional branch, and the team was renamed FC Nordsjælland.)	(United States) Carrie Kveton (Note: Carrie Kveton resigned effective immediately on 24 November 2019, while Niclas Hougaard Hansen on 17 December 2019 was announced as the new head coach beginning 1 January 2020.) (Denmark) Niclas Hougaard	
2020–21	HB Køge (1)	Brøndby IF	Fortuna Hjørring	(Denmark) Peer Lisdorf	
2021–22	HB Køge (2)	Fortuna Hjørring	Brøndby IF	(Denmark) Søren Randa-Boldt	
2022–23	HB Køge (3)	Brøndby IF	Fortuna Hjørring	(Denmark) Søren Randa-Boldt	
2023–24	FC Nordsjælland (1)	Brøndby IF	HB Køge	(England) Chris Sargeant	
2024–25	Fortuna Hjørring (12)	FC Nordsjælland	HB Køge	(Denmark) Lene Terp	

==== A-Liga (2025–present) ====
Season	Champions (titles)	Runners-up	Third place	Winning head coach(es)	Ref(s)
2025–26	HB Køge (4)	Brøndby IF	Fortuna Hjørring	(Denmark) Kristian Mørch	
2026–27	Season in progress				

== Performances ==
Nine clubs have claimed the Danish national title. Among these, half of the championships have been won by Jutlandic clubs, with more than one-third by teams from Zealand, and one-seventh by Funen-based squads. No teams from the regional football associations of DBU Copenhagen, DBU Lolland-Falster, and DBU Bornholm have finished in the top spot. Copenhagen-based BK Rødovre were runners-up in 1991, achieved third place on five occasions, and qualified for the championship playoffs in the two first editions. Funen-based B 1921 finished 8th in the 2002–03 season, while Bornholm-based Svaneke BK ended the 1980 season in 7th place (east group).

Since the 2002–03 season, the Danish FA has officially permitted clubs to display a symbolic five-pointed gold star, designed by the national association, above the club's logo on their jerseys for every fifth championship won. Fortuna Hjørring added a star above the previous wordmark logo shortly thereafter. When Fortuna Hjørring introduced a new logo design in March/April 2008, a yellow star became an integral part of the new design. Upon winning their 10th title in 2018, a second star was incorporated into the logo. Brøndby IF Women used this option for the first time during the 2011–12 season by featuring a single yellow star on their jersey designs, with a second star added in 2015. The reigning champions also wear a black-and-white version of the Danish FA logo with the text "Danmarksmester" on the right sleeve or on the chest, alongside the year of their championship at the bottom, throughout the following season.

=== Performance by club ===
Rank	Club	Champions	Runners-up	Winning seasons
1	**Fortuna Hjørring**	12	22	1994, 1995, 1996, 1998–99, 2001–02, 2008–09, 2009–10, 2013–14, 2015–16, 2017–18, 2019–20, 2024–25
2	**Brøndby IF**	12	11	2002–03, 2003–04, 2004–05, 2005–06, 2006–07, 2007–08, 2010–11, 2011–12, 2012–13, 2014–15, 2016–17, 2018–19
3	HEI	10	6	1982, 1984, 1986, 1987, 1988, 1989, 1990, 1991, 1996–97, 1997–98
4	B 1909	5	5	1981, 1983, 1985, 1992, 1993
5	Ribe BK (Note: Ribe changed their name to Ribe BK in October 1993 due to Nørremarkens BK being merged into the club.)	5	1	1973, 1974, 1976, 1978, 1979
6	**HB Køge**	4	0	2020–21, 2021–22, 2022–23, 2025–26
7	BK Femina	3	4	1975, 1977, 1980
8	**OB Q** (Note: The women's football department at Odense BK was detached from the club at the end of the 2015–16 season. In March 2016, the women's elite department, OB Kvinde Elite, was refounded as a separate association football club named Odense Q, assuming the league license of Odense BK beginning from the 2016–17 season. Odense Sport & Event bought Odense Q in June 2023. From the 2023–24 season, the team was integrated in the OS&E setup under the name Odense Boldklub Q.)	2	0	1999–2000, 2000–01
9	**FC Nordsjælland**	1	1	2023–24
—	BK Stjernen	0	2	
—	**Kolding IF (Note: In mid-1996, Kolding BK's women's department was closed following a merger with Kolding IF. In 2000, Kolding BK once again fielded a senior 11-a-side, under the banner of Kolding IF. In the summer of 2006, Kolding BK took over the administration of Kolding IF's senior women's team, which continued to play under the Kolding BK banner. The then youth superstructure, known as KoldingQ, embraced Kolding BK's first senior women's team in August 2009, while the senior reserve teams continued playing under the Kolding BK banner. In July 2019, KoldingQ became a separate entity encompassing teams for seniors, under-18 and under-16. In September 2021, it was revealed that KoldingQ would merge and become part of Kolding IF, which occurred at the end of October 2021 – the first match under the Kolding IF Women banner was played on 1 November 2021.)**	0	1	
—	BK Rødovre	0	1	

Clubs participating in the 2026–27 A-Liga are designated in bold type.
Clubs no longer with an active women's football department, not fielding a senior 11-a-side squad (as of June 2024) or that have become defunct are denoted in italics.

=== Performance by regional association ===
Rank	Region	Titles	Club(s)
1	DBU Jutland	27	Fortuna Hjørring (12), IK Skovbakken (10), Ribe BK (5)
2	DBU Zealand	20	Brøndby IF (12), BK Femina (3), HB Køge (4), FC Nordsjælland (1)
3	DBU Funen	7	B 1909 (5), OB (2)
—	DBU Copenhagen	0	
—	DBU Lolland-Falster	0	
—	DBU Bornholm	0	
