= 2012–13 Danish Elite Division =

Danish Elite Division
- Season: 2012–13
- Dates: 4 August 2012 – 9 June 2013
- Champions: Brøndby; 8th title
- Relegated: Vejle; B 1913
- Champions League: Brøndby; Fortuna Hjørring
- Matches: 102
- Biggest home win: BSF 8–0 B 1913 (28 October 2012)
- Biggest away win: 0–5; 5 matches (Note: Fortuna Hjørring won four away games 5–0, while Brøndby won one.)
- Highest scoring: Brøndby 9–3 B.93/HIK/Skjold (30 September 2012)
- Longest winning run: 18 matches Brøndby
- Longest unbeaten run: 18 matches Brøndby
- Longest winless run: 10 matches B.93/HIK/Skjold
- Longest losing run: 7 matches Vejle
- Only matches in the regular season and the championship play-offs are covered in the statistics

The 2012–13 Danish Elite Division was the 41st season of A-Liga, the top-flight of the Danish Women's Football League.

Brøndby IF won their eighth championship, and the third one in a row, winning all games but one against Fortuna Hjørring in the championship play-offs, both clubs qualifying for the 2013-14 UEFA Women's Champions League. OB and IK Skovbakken also made it to the championship play-offs, while Vejle and B 1913 were relegated.

== Teams ==
There are 10 teams competing in the regular season of the league: the top four teams from the previous season's championship play-offs, the top four teams from the previous season's qualification play-offs, and the two promoted teams from the 1st division. The two teams promoted from the 1st division were B1913 and Skjold, replacing relegated teams Team Viborg and SønderjyskE.

=== Changes ===
▲ from 2011–12 1st Division	▼ to 2012–13 1st Division
B1913; B.93/HIK/Skjold	SønderjyskE; Team Viborg

=== Stadiums and locations ===
Locations of the 2012–13 Elitedivisionen teams.

Team	Location	Stadium	Capacity
B1913	Odense	Campus Road Stadium	5,000
B.93/HIK/Skjold	Copenhagen	Østerbro Stadium	4,400
Brøndby IF	Brøndby	Brøndby Stadium	23,400
BSF	Ballerup	Ballerup Stadium	4,000
Fortuna Hjørring	Hjørring	Hjørring Stadium	10,000
Skovbakken	Aarhus	Vejlby Stadium	3,400
KoldingQ	Kolding	Mosevej Sports Grounds	1,500
OB	Odense	Odense Athletics Stadium	8,000
Taastrup	Taastrup	Taastrup Sports Park	1,000
Vejle	Vejle	VB Parken	1,000

=== Personnel and kits ===
Team	Manager	Captain	Kit	Sponsor
B 1913	(Denmark) Helge Thomsen	(Denmark)		
B.93/HIK/Skjold	(United States) Denise Reddy	(Denmark) Rosanna Stormly		
Brøndby	(Denmark) Peer Lisdorf	(Denmark) Malene Marquard		
BSF	(Denmark) Denni Conteh	(Denmark) Mathilde Blak Madsen		
Fortuna Hjørring	(Denmark) Brian Sørensen	(Denmark)		
IK Skovbakken	(Denmark) Carsten Karkov	(Denmark)		
KoldingQ	(Denmark) Lene Terp	(Denmark)		
OB	(Denmark) Thomas Hansen	(Denmark)		
Taastrup	(Denmark) Michael Juul	(Denmark)		
Vejle	(Denmark) Jesper Søgaard	(Denmark)		

== Regular season ==
=== League table ===
Pos	Team	Pld	W	D	L	GF	GA	GD	Pts	Qualification
1	Brøndby	18	18	0	0	78	11	+67	54	Championship play-offs
2	Fortuna Hjørring	18	15	1	2	72	10	+62	46	Championship play-offs
3	OB	18	9	2	7	25	31	−6	29	Championship play-offs
4	Skovbakken	18	8	3	7	26	28	−2	27	Championship play-offs
5	KoldingQ	18	7	1	10	33	36	−3	22	Qualification play-offs
6	Taastrup	18	6	2	10	24	46	−22	20	Qualification play-offs
7	BSF	18	6	1	11	35	43	−8	19	Qualification play-offs
8	B.93/HIK/Skjold	18	4	6	8	32	45	−13	18	Qualification play-offs
9	B 1913	18	5	1	12	21	56	−35	16	Qualification play-offs
10	Vejle	18	2	3	13	13	53	−40	9	Qualification play-offs

Source: Danish Football Association (in Danish)
Rules for classification: 1) Points; 2) Goal difference; 3) Goals scored; 4) Away goals scored; 5) Play-off (played on neutral ground if determining teams for different rounds); 6) Draw.

=== Results ===
Home \ Away	B93	B13	BRØ	BSF	HJØ	KOL	ODE	IKS	TAA	VEJ
B.93/HIK/Skjold		1–2	0–5	3–1	2–2	0–1	2–4	1–1	3–0	1–1
B 1913	2–2		0–4	3–2	0–3	0–2	1–2	4–0	1–4	1–0
Brøndby	9–3	8–0		2–1	2–1	6–2	7–0	3–1	5–0	4–0
BSF	2–2	8–0	2–6		0–5	3–0	0–1	2–3	1–3	3–1
Fortuna Hjørring	6–1	5–0	0–2	6–0		2–0	3–0	4–0	6–0	3–0
Kolding	2–2	3–0	0–1	5–2	0–5		1–2	1–3	2–3	5–0
OB	2–0	2–3	1–5	0–3	0–3	4–1		0–0	1–0	4–0
Skovbakken	1–3	4–0	0–3	1–0	0–5	0–1	1–0		4–0	3–0
Taastrup	4–3	2–1	0–2	0–1	3–8	1–0	1–1	1–4		0–0
Vejle	0–3	4–3	0–4	2–4	0–5	2–7	0–1	0–0	3–2	

Source: Danish Football Association (in Danish)
Legend: Blue = home team win; Yellow = draw; Red = away team win.

== Play-offs ==
=== Championship ===
For the championship play-offs, the points of the regular season are halved, rounded up and carried over.

Pos	Team	Pld	W	D	L	GF	GA	GD	Pts	Qualification
1	Brøndby (C)	6	5	1	0	29	3	+26	43	Champions League QR
2	Fortuna Hjørring	6	4	1	1	11	8	+3	36	Champions League QR
3	OB	6	0	2	4	3	15	−12	17	
4	Skovbakken	6	0	2	4	1	18	−17	16	

Source: Danish Football Association
Rules for classification: 1) Points; 2) Goal difference; 3) Number of goals scored; 4) Head-to-head points; 5) Head-to-head goal difference; 6) Head-to-head away goals scored
(C) Champions

==== Results ====
Home \ Away	BRØ	HJØ	ODE	IKS
Brøndby		6–1	2–0	6–0
Fortuna Hjørring	1–1		2–1	2–0
OB	1–6	0–4		1–1
Skovbakken	0–8	0–1	0–0	

Source: DBU.dk
Legend: Blue = home team win; Yellow = draw; Red = away team win.

=== Qualification ===
#	Teams	Pld	W	D	L	GF	GA	Pts	PS	Qualification or relegation
5	Kolding Q	5	4	0	1	11	4	23	2	
6	BSF Skovlunde	5	3	0	2	13	6	19	2	
7	Taastrup FC	5	2	0	3	7	12	16	1	
8	BK Skjold	5	4	0	1	7	4	16	(P)	
9	Vejle	5	2	0	3	10	9	16	2	Relegated to the 2013–14 Kvinde 1. division
10	BK 1913	5	0	0	5	5	16	8	(P)	Relegated to the 2013–14 Kvinde 1. division

2012–13	KOL	BSF	TAA	SKJ	VEJ	B13
Kolding Q		3-0	1-0		1-0	
BSF Skovlunde				1-0	2-3	5-0
Taastrup FC		0-5		0-1		3-2
BK Skjold	3-2				2-1	
Vejle BK			3-4			3-0
BK 1913	1-4			0-1		

== See also ==
- 2012–13 Danish Women's Cup
