= 2012–13 Danish Women's Cup =

The 2012–13 Danish Women's Cup was the twenty-first edition of the Danish women's football national cup. It ran from April 16, 2012 to June 5, 2013.

Defending champion Brøndby IF defeated Fortuna Hjørring in the final, becoming the first team to win four editions in a row and reaching Fortuna in the top of the competition's palmares with seven trophies. It also marked its third consecutive double. The previous edition's final was repeated in the Round of 32, with Brøndby IF again beating BK Skjold by a wide margin.

== Results ==
Round of 32; June 12 – August 1, 2012
Esbjerg fB	1
Varde IF	7
KFUM Odense	0
Kolding Q	3
Sønderborg Fremad	w/o
SønderjyskE
Bording IF	0
Vejle B	6
Vordingborg IF	2
Sundby	3
Damsø	1
Taastrup	3
AaB	0
Fortuna Hjørring	3
Aalborg Freja	2
Team Viborg	4
ASA	3
Vejlby IK	5
Aarhus 1900	0
IK Skovbakken	16
Frederiksberg	1
Raklev GI	5
Skjold	0
Brøndby IF	8
Hillerød G&IF	1
BK Heimdal	2
Amager FF
BSF	w/o
Ubberud IF	5
Årslev BK	0
B 1913	5
OB	4

Round of 16; August 15 – August 22, 2012
Varde IF	0
KoldingQ	4
Sønderborg Fremad
Vejle B	w/o
Sundby	0
Taastrup FC	5
Fortuna Hjørring	8
Team Viborg	1
Vejlby IK	1
IK Skovbakken	5
Raklev GI	0
Brøndby IF	10
BK Heimdal	0
BSF	6
Ubberud IF
B 1913	w/o

Quarterfinals; August 29, 2012 – March 16, 2013
Kolding Q	2
Vejle B	0
Taastrup FC	0
Fortuna Hjørring	3
IK Skovbakken	1
Brøndby	5
BSF	2
B1913	0

Semifinals; April 17 – April 24, 2013
KoldingQ	2	0	2
Fortuna Hjørring	4	3	7
Brøndby	7	3	10
BSF	2	2	4

Final; June 5, 2013
Fortuna Hjørring	2
Brøndby	3

Final

June 5, 2013
17:00 (CEST)

Fortuna Hjørring	2 – 3	Brøndby
Nadim 58', 62'	Report	Rydahl-Bukh 3'; Madsen 6'; Troelsgaard-Nielsen 90'

Hjørring Stadion, Hjørring
Attendance: 1,892
