= Katrine Svane =

Danish footballer (born 1997)

Personal information
- Full name: Katrine Svane Jacobsen
- Date of birth: 17 March 1998 (age 28)
- Place of birth: Viborg, Denmark
- Height: 1.71 m (5 ft 7 in)
- Position: Goalkeeper

Youth career
- 2014–2015: Team Viborg
- 2016–2017: IK Skovbakken

Senior career*
Years	Team	Apps	(Gls)
2018–2020	VSK Aarhus	49	(0)
2020–2024	AGF	84	(0)

International career
2013–2014	Denmark U16	7	(0)
2014–2015	Denmark U17	7	(0)
2015–2017	Denmark U19	17	(0)
2021–2022	Denmark	1	(0)
- * Club domestic league appearances and goals

Katrine Svane (born 17 March 1998) is a Danish former professional football player who played as a goalkeeper for AGF in the Danish A-Liga and the Denmark national team. In 2024, Svane retired at 26, following a sustained period of injuries.

== Career ==
=== Club ===
Svane has performed since 2015 for the Aarhus clubs IK Skovbakken, VSK Aarhus, and since the summer of 2020 for the transfer in AGF. She is a regular first keeper in goal for the club.

=== National ===
She has represented the Danish youth teams several times. In 2022 she was called up to the senior Denmark national team. She was originally selected for two friendlies on the senior team in April 2021, against the countries of Ireland and Wales, in Dublin and Cardiff respectively. However, she did not come into action in the two matches.

== Honours ==
- Elitedivisionen
  - Bronze Medalist: 2019
