= Louise Lundsgaard =

Danish footballer (born 1987)

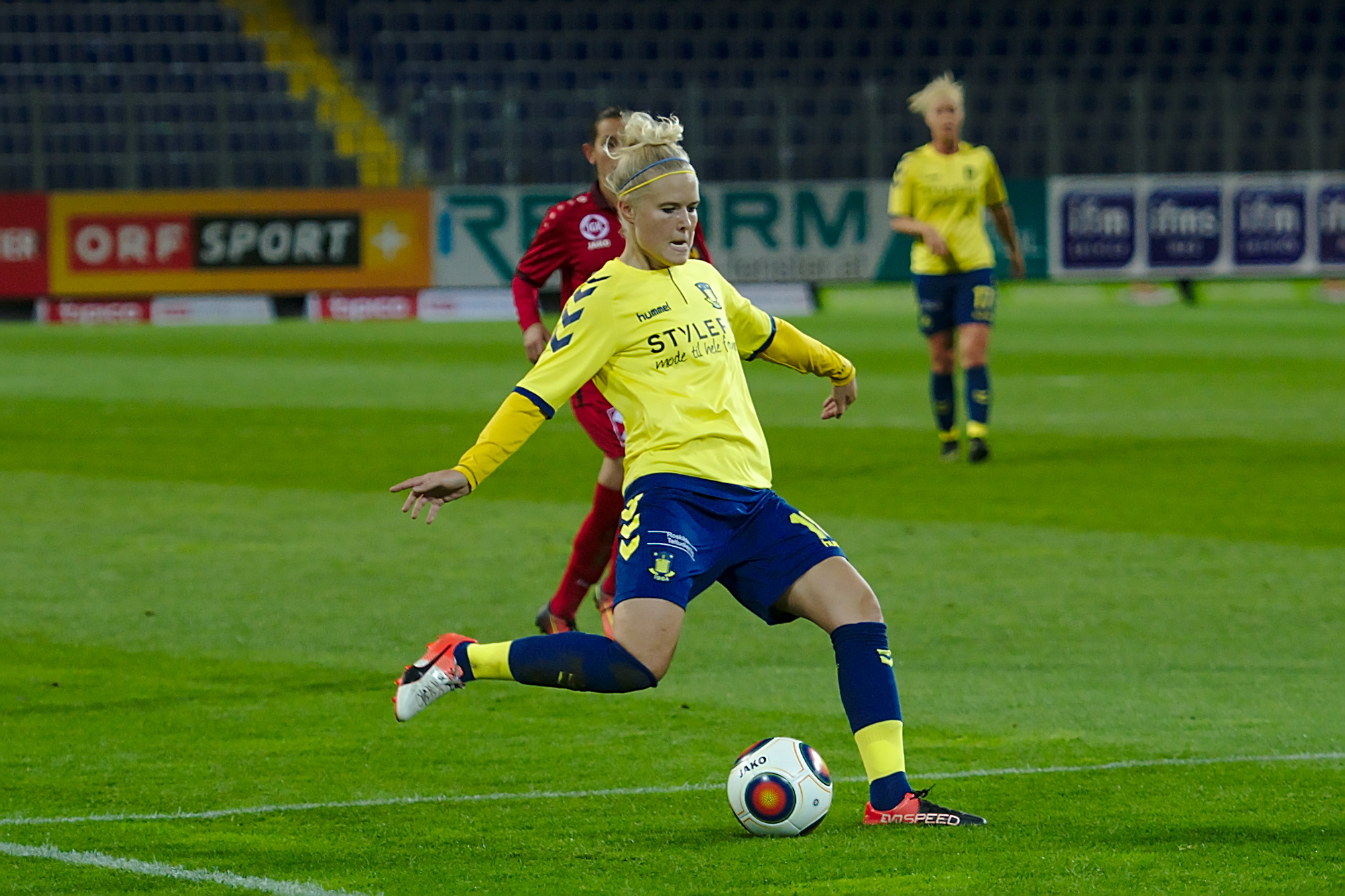
- Lundsgaard at the 2016 Champions League R32 match against SKN St.Poelten

Personal information
- Full name: Louise Lundsgaard Winter Kristiansen
- Date of birth: 24 September 1987 (age 39)
- Place of birth: Kalundborg, Denmark
- Height: 1.76 m (5 ft 9 in)
- Position: Forward

Senior career*
Years	Team	Apps	(Gls)
2004	B73 Slagelse		
2005–08	BSF		
2008–12	IK Skovbakken		
2014	BSF		
2014–2024	Brøndby IF	73	(14)

International career
2004	Denmark U17	7	(3)
2004–06	Denmark U19	25	(18)
2005	Denmark U21	4	(1)
2009	Denmark U23	2	(0)
2016–	Denmark	12	(0)
- * Club domestic league appearances and goals

Louise Lundsgaard Winter Kristiansen (born 24 September 1987) is a Danish former international footballer who played as a forward. She was a member of the Denmark national team and took part in the 2016 Algarve Cup. Lundsgaard played for A-Liga clubs BSF, IK Skovbakken (now AGF), and Brøndby.

She made her debut on the Danish national team in October 2006, against the USA at a tournament in Busan, South Korea.

She has previously appeared for Ballerup-Skovlunde Fodbold and IK Skovbakken.

== Merits ==
=== Club ===
Brøndby IF

A-Liga

- Gold: 2018–19
- Gold: 2016–17
- Gold: 2014–15
- Silver: 2017–18
- Silver: 2015–16

Danish Cup

- Gold: 2018
- Gold: 2017
- Gold: 2015
- Silver: 2019
- Silver: 2016
