= Camilla Kur Larsen =

Danish footballer (born 1989)

Personal information
- Full name: Camilla Kur Larsen
- Date of birth: 3 April 1989 (age 37)
- Place of birth: Ishøj, Denmark
- Height: 1.75 m (5 ft 9 in)
- Position: Forward

Youth career
- 1998–2006: Greve IF
- 2006–2008: AC2670

Senior career*
Years	Team	Apps	(Gls)
2008	Skjold	11	(5)
2009–2012	Brøndby	115	(66)
2012	Colorado Rapids	7	(0)
2012–2014	Fortuna Hjørring	82	(?)
2015	Western New York Flash	3	(0)
2015	AGSM Verona	2	(1)
2016–2017	Fortuna Hjørring	?	(?)
2017	Vålerenga	11	(2)
2019–2021	Nordsjælland	32	(16)
2021–2022	Fortuna Hjørring	19	(7)
2023	Blackburn Rovers	5	(0)

International career
2009–2011	Denmark U23	3	(0)
2011–2017	Denmark	10	(0)
- * Club domestic league appearances and goals

Camilla Kur Larsen (born 3 April 1989) is a Danish former professional footballer who appeared for the Denmark women's national football team.

== Club career ==
Larsen spent the first season of her professional career with Skjold before moving on to Brøndby for the next three seasons. Larsen's first stint playing in the United States came immediately after the conclusion of the 2011–12 Danish Women's League season; she flew to the United States the day after her last match for Brøndby. She played in seven matches for the newly established Colorado Rapids in the 2012 W-League season, the team finishing fourth in the Western Division.

Following the end of the W-League season Larsen would return to Denmark, this time joining Fortuna Hjørring for two seasons. She would then return to the United States for the 2015 National Women's Soccer League season, where she made three appearances for the Western New York Flash. Larsen would move from the Flash to AGSM Verona in Italy, though her time there was short as she left the club due to unpaid salary after she had surgery on her knee.

She would return to Denmark and her former club Hjørring for a season and a half, where she would win the domestic league and cup double. Larsen would once again go abroad in 2017, this time to Vålerenga for her first season in Norway. After her time in Norway, Larsen took a break from football due to her pregnancy and birth of her first child. She returned to the pitch in the 2019–20 season with Nordsjælland who she played with for two seasons. Larsen would return to Hjørring for a third and ultimately final time ahead of the 2021–22 season.

After the conclusion of the 2021–22 Danish season, Larsen moved with her daughter to England where her husband, Brian Sørensen, was managing Everton. In her final match in Denmark, her 136th with Fortuna Hjørring across three stints, she scored the winning goal against Sundby. After moving to England, Larsen would go on to join Blackburn Rovers just over halfway through the 2022–23 Women's Championship on 28 February 2023, her first time playing for an English club. After encountering injuries in her partial season with Blackburn and only making five total appearances, Larsen retired on 22 May 2023, bringing an end to her 15-year professional career.

== International career ==
Larsen made ten appearances for the senior Danish national team over the span of seven years. She made her debut in an Algarve Cup match on the 2 March 2011 as a substitute in a 1–0 win over China. Three years later on 12 February 2014 she made her first start for the national team, once again in a match against China. Larsen made what would be her final appearance at the international level on 20 January 2017 in a friendly against Scotland.

== Personal life ==
Larsen is married to Brian Sørensen, a football manager who has managed various women's teams in Denmark and has managed Everton's women's team since the 2022–23 Women's Super League. The couple have a daughter named Rose.

== Honours ==
Brøndby

- A-Liga: 2010–11, 2011–12
- Danish Women's Cup: 2010–11, 2011–12

Fortuna Hjørring

- A-Liga: 2013–14, 2015–16
- Danish Women's Cup: 2015–16
