= VSK Aarhus (women) =

Danish women's association football team

- Full name: Vejlby Skovbakken Aarhus
- Founded: 28 June 2016; 10 years ago
- Ground: Veljby Stadion, Aarhus
- Chairman: Leif Gjørtz Christensen
- Coach: Morten Skarby
- League: C-Liga
- 2025-26: Denmark Series, 1st of 8 (promoted)
colours	colours

VSK Aarhus is a Danish women's football team based in Risskov, Aarhus. They currently compete in the C-Liga, the 3rd tier of the Danish Women's Football League. The club serves as the reserve team for AGF.

== History ==
=== Top tier team ===
A previous club of the same name competed in the top flight A-Liga until 2020, when it was merged with IF Lyseng and Aarhus Gymnastikforening to create AGF Fodbold, who currently compete in the top flight as well.

The club was originally founded as Hjortshøj-Egå IF, known as HEI Aarhus. It was the most prolific team in the 1980s top-flight, winning eight championships between 1982 and 1991 including a six-year winning streak. The club subsequently won the two first editions of the national cup in 1993 and 1994, and two more championships in 1997 and 1998.

In 2002 the team was transferred to IK Skovbakken. It won its first title as such, its third national cup, in 2009. It also reached the final in 2003, 2006 and 2010. In the league the club has usually ranked third, with Brøndby IF and Fortuna Hjørring dominating the championship.

In 2016 IK Skovbakken and Vejlby IK Fodbold merged into VSK Aarhus, short for Vejlby Skovbakken Aarhus.

VSK Aarhus merged with IF Lyseng and Aarhus Gymnastikforening in 2020 to create AGF Fodbold, as the clubs wished to create a team to compete in the top flight of Danish football. AGF inherited VSK's league position.

=== 2020–present ===
VSK gained promotion to the 2026–27 C-Liga from the 2025–26 Denmark Series in an undefeated campaign.

== Players ==
=== Current squad ===
As of July 2026

Note: Flags indicate national team as defined under FIFA eligibility rules; some limited exceptions apply. Players may hold more than one non-FIFA nationality.

No.	Pos.	Nation	Player
—		DEN	Freja Buck
—		DEN	Natasja Uldall
—		DEN	Sarah Byrialsen
—		DEN	Victoria Bjerregaard
—		DEN	Amalie Leonhard
—		DEN	Josefine Valbak
—		DEN	Maja Mølgaard
—		DEN	Maria Lenskjold
—		DEN	Alberte Lund
—		DEN	Signe Dall

No.	Pos.	Nation	Player
—		ISL	Snædís Arnarsdóttir
—		DEN	Simone Torstensen
—		DEN	Ditte Langberg
—		DEN	Smila Bornung-Hilker
—		DEN	Matilde Kruse
—		DEN	Nina Kirk
—		DEN	Kathrine Brincks
—		DEN	Caroline Borch
—		DEN	Katrine Arndal
—		DEN	Sanne Holt

== See also ==
- AGF
- VSK Aarhus (men's team)
