= Freja Thisgaard =

Danish association football player

Personal information
- Full name: Freja Rosenkrans Thisgaard
- Date of birth: 24 July 2002 (age 24)
- Height: 1.65 m (5 ft 5 in)
- Position: Goalkeeper

Team information
- Current team: Fortuna Hjørring

Youth career
- –2019: Viborg FF

Senior career*
Years	Team	Apps	(Gls)
2019–2026	Fortuna Hjørring	48	(0)
2026	Napoli	4	(0)
2026–	Fortuna Hjørring		

International career^{‡}
2025–	Denmark	6	(0)
- * Club domestic league appearances and goals as of 14 April 2026 ‡ National team caps and goals as of 14 April 2026

Freja Thisgaard is a Danish professional footballer, who plays as a goalkeeper for A-Liga club Fortuna Hjørring and the Denmark women's national football team.

Thisgaard briefly considered quitting football following an extensive shoulder injury.

== Club career ==
Thisgaard played for A-Liga club Fortuna Hjørring from 2019 to 2026, with which she won the league twice in 2020 and 2025, respectively, as well as two Danish Cup titles in 2022 and 2025, winning "The Double" in 2025. Thisgaard transferred to Italian side Napoli in January 2026.

== International career ==
Thisgaard played for various Danish youth teams before receiving her first senior call-up to the national team in October 2025 under new head coach Jakob Michelsen. She made her debut on 24 October 2025 against Finland
