= Brian Sørensen (disambiguation) =

Brian Sørensen is a Danish football coach.

Brian Sørensen may also refer to:

- Brian Buur, also known as Brian Sørensen, Danish darts player in 2007 BDO World Darts Championship etc.
- Brian Holm Sørensen, Danish cyclist
- Brian Sorensen (musician), former member of Paradox (German band)

== See also ==
- Brian Sorenson, cricketer
