= Turbine Hallencup =

The Internationalen Turbine Hallencup is an indoor five-a-side women's football invitational tournament organized by German club 1. FFC Turbine Potsdam. The inaugural edition was held in Potsdam's MBS Arena on 2 – 3 February 2013, and it was won by Brøndby IF.

== List of finals ==
Year	Champion	Res.	Runner-up	Third	Res.	Fourth
2013	(Denmark) Brøndby	4–3	(Germany) Turbine Potsdam	(Austria) Neulengbach	4–2	(Scotland) Glasgow City
2014	(Germany) Turbine Potsdam	5–0	(Denmark) Brøndby	(Austria) Neulengbach	3–1	(Scotland) Glasgow City
2015	(Germany) Turbine Potsdam	4–1	(Denmark) Brøndby	(Austria) Neulengbach (PSO: 8-7)	4–4	(Czech Republic) Sparta Prague
2016	(Austria) St. Pölten-Spratzern	3–2	(Czech Republic) Sparta Prague	(Germany) Turbine Potsdam	4–2	(Scotland) Glasgow City
2017	(Germany) Turbine Potsdam	3–1	(Portugal) Sporting CP	(Austria) St. Pölten	3–1	(Czech Republic) Sparta Prague
2018	(Germany) Turbine Potsdam	4–1	(Portugal) Sporting CP	(Austria) St. Pölten	2–0	(Czech Republic) Sparta Prague
2019	(Czech Republic) Sparta Prague	4–1	(Germany) Turbine Potsdam	(Poland) Czarni Sosnowiec	5–1	(Hungary) MTK Hungária
2020	(Germany) Turbine Potsdam	4–0	(Austria) St. Pölten	(Czech Republic) Sparta Prague	2–1	(Denmark) Fortuna Hjørring
