= Søren Randa-Boldt =

Danish football manager (born 1971)

Personal information
- Date of birth: 4 October 1971 (age 55)
- Position: Midfielder

Youth career
- 1980–1988: Vanløse IF

Senior career*
| Years | Team | Apps | (Gls) |
| 1988–2000 | Vanløse IF | | |

Managerial career
- 1988–1999: Vanløse IF (youth)
- 2000–2004: Brøndby W
- 2008–2021: Denmark U19
- 2017: Denmark (interim)
- 2021–2023: HB Køge
- * Club domestic league appearances and goals

Søren Randa-Boldt is a Danish football manager and former player. Randa-Boldt has previously managed the Denmark national team in 2017, as well as A-Liga clubs Brøndby and HB Køge, the latter his most recent position until 2023. Randa-Boldt started coaching during his active playing career at Vanløse IF, where he coached the youth team, and spent over a decade coaching the Denmark under-19s.
