= Janelle Cordia =

American soccer player

Personal information
- Full name: Janelle Alysse Cordia
- Date of birth: May 24, 1987 (age 39)
- Height: 1.68 m (5 ft 6 in)
- Position: Defender

Team information
- Current team: Fortuna Hjørring
- Number: 66

College career
Years	Team	Apps	(Gls)
2005–2008	Missouri Tigers	84	(5)

Senior career*
Years	Team	Apps	(Gls)
2011–2013	Åland United		
2014–2019	Fortuna Hjørring		
2019–2021	Fiorentina		
2021–	Fortuna Hjørring		
- * Club domestic league appearances and goals

Janelle Alysse Cordia (born May 24, 1987) is an American professional soccer player who plays as a defender for A-Liga club Fortuna Hjørring. Cordia previously played for Serie A club Fiorentina, and Finnish side Åland United.
