= Cecilie Winther Johansen =

Danish footballer (born 2000)

Cecilie Johansen
Personal information
- Full name: Cecilie Winther Johansen
- Date of birth: 14 June 2000 (age 26)
- Place of birth: Ikast, Denmark
- Height: 1.68 m (5 ft 6 in)
- Position: Midfielder

Team information
- Current team: AGF
- Number: 7

Youth career
- Vildbjerg SF

Senior career*
Years	Team	Apps	(Gls)
2018–2020	VSK Aarhus	41	(9)
2020–2023	AGF	70	(16)
2023–2024	Bayer Leverkusen	13	(0)
2024–	AGF	23	(0)

International career^{‡}
2015–2016	Denmark U16	8	(0)
2016–2017	Denmark U17	9	(3)
2017–2019	Denmark U19	16	(4)
2023–	Denmark U23	5	(2)
- * Club domestic league appearances and goals as of 19 April 2024 ‡ National team caps and goals as of 22 February 2024

Cecilie Winther Johansen (born 14 June 2000) is a Danish professional footballer who plays as a midfielder for A-Liga club AGF.

Johansen was born in Ikast, Denmark and played youth football with Vildbjerg SF before starting her professional career with VSK Aarhus in 2018. After VSK Aarhus was merged into AGF in 2020, Johansen played for the club for three years until 2023. She signed with Frauen-Bundesliga side Bayer Leverkusen in 2023. In 2024, Johansen returned to AGF.
