= Janne Madsen =

Danish footballer (born 1978)

Personal information
- Date of birth: 12 March 1978 (age 48)
- Position: Midfielder

Youth career
- Spjald IF

Senior career*
Years	Team	Apps	(Gls)
- Grønbjerg IF
1999–2014	Fortuna Hjørring		

International career^{‡}
2000–2009	Denmark	61	(4)
- * Club domestic league appearances and goals ‡ National team caps and goals as of 18 December 2007

Janne Madsen (born 12 March 1978) is a Danish former football midfielder. She lastly played for Fortuna Hjørring and the Danish national team. She played 390 matches for Fortuna. During her 15 years at the club she won the Danish Women's Cup 6 times, and was named player of the tournament in the 2001 edition. She also won the Danish Championship 4 times with the club. In 2003 she and the club reached the final of the UEFA Women's Cup, where they lost to Swedish team Umeå IK 7-1. Madsen scored Fortuna's only goal in the match. This is the only time a Danish club has played in the final.

After her playing career she has worked at her former club and at the Denmark women's national football team as a team leader.
