= Ea Rasmussen =

Danish footballer born in 2001

Personal information
- Full name: Ea Maiken Rasmussen
- Date of birth: 11 March 2001 (age 25)
- Place of birth: Horsens, Denmark
- Height: 1.74 m (5 ft 9 in)
- Position: Midfielder

Team information
- Current team: AGF
- Number: 17

Youth career
- 2016–2017: FC Horsens
- 2017–2018: KoldingQ

Senior career*
Years	Team	Apps	(Gls)
2018–2025	KoldingQ	119	(9)
2025–	AGF	1	(0)

International career^{‡}
2017	Denmark U16	7	(0)
2017–2018	Denmark U17	9	(0)
2018–2020	Denmark U19	15	(1)
2023–	Denmark U23	8	(0)
- * Club domestic league appearances and goals as of 23 November 2024 ‡ National team caps and goals as of 2 June 2024

Ea Maiken Rasmussen (born 11 March 2001) is a Danish professional footballer who plays as a midfielder for A-Liga club AGF.

== Club career ==
She played for the Danish top-flight club KoldingQ in the A-Liga from 2018 to 2025. She has previously played for FC Horsens's women's team on youth level her whole youth career, until she moved to KoldingQ in 2017, to play for the junior team.

== Personal life ==
Rasmussen supports Liverpool and idolises Steven Gerrard. She has travelled with her family to England in the autumn to watch Liverpool play. Rasmussen went to BGI akademiet in Hornsyld.
