= Poul Højmose =

Danish footballer and manager (born 1954)

Personal information
- Date of birth: 28 September 1954 (age 72)
- Place of birth: Grønbjerg, Denmark
- Position: Forward

Youth career
- Years: Team
- Grønbjerg IF
- Spjald GIF
- Videbæk IF

Managerial career
- –1988: Hjortshøj-Egaa IF
- 1987–1999: Danish women's youth
- 1999–2005: Denmark
- 2011–2020: IF Lyseng head of talent development

Poul Højmose (born September 28, 1954) is a Danish football manager and former player. He is the former manager of the Denmark women's national team. Højmose was the first full time coach for the national team. In May 2025, Højmose was inducted into the Danish football Hall of Fame as the first ever full-time coach for the Denmark women's national football team for his contributions to women's football in Denmark.

== Career ==
As an active footballer, Højmose played for Grønbjerg IF, Spjald GIF and Videbæk IF. At the age of 20, an injury made him focus on coaching rather than playing.

He then became a coach for the men's team at IK Skovbakken and Silkeborg IF. In 1994 he was the assistant to Bo Johansson at Silkeborg IF, when they won the Danish Championship.

He was also the head coach of Hjortshøj-Egaa IF, where he won the Danish women's championship twice.

In 1987 he was hired by the Danish FA as the head of talent development and manager of the Danish women's youth teams. In 1998 he led the U18 team to gold medals at the 1998 UEFA Women's Under-18 Championship.

After the 1999 FIFA Women's World Cup, he was named the head coach of the Danish senior national team. In 2001 he made history, when he became the first fulltime professional coach for the Danish women's national team. In 2005 he retired from the position after the 2005 UEFA Women's Championship. He managed the Danish national team in 72 matches, winning 31 and drawing 10. His best result was reaching the semifinal of the 2001 UEFA Women's Championship.

Between 2011 and 2020 he was the head of talent development at the Aarhus club IF Lyseng.

== Personal life ==
Højmose is married to Susan Mackensie, a former footballer who he coached at Hjortshøj-Egå. In 2004 the couple were living in Højbjerg with their two daughters.

He is educated as a typographer and primary school teacher.
