= Flemming Nielsen (footballer, born 1954) =

Danish footballer (1954–2018)

Personal information
- Date of birth: 16 July 1954
- Place of birth: Korsløkke, Denmark
- Date of death: 23 June 2018 (aged 63)
- Position: Right-back

Senior career*
Years	Team	Apps	(Gls)
1973–1978	Odense Boldklub		
1978–1982	Fortuna Köln	40	(0)
1982–1983	South China AA		
1983	Odense Boldklub		
1984–1985	AaB Fodbold		

International career
1976	Denmark U21	2	(0)
1978–1979	Denmark	5	(0)

Managerial career
- 1992: B1909
- * Club domestic league appearances and goals

Flemming Nielsen (16 July 1954 – 23 June 2018) was a Danish footballer. He was a right-back and played for OKS, Odense Boldklub, Fortuna Köln, South China FC, AaB and Aalborg Freja.

He played two matches for Denmark's U-21 national team in 1976 and five matches for their national team in 1978–79.

After his professional career, he was a coach for B1909 and FC Nordjylland as well as assistant coach and sports manager for the Viborg FF.

Until his death, he was talent manager and U18 coach for the women's team Fortuna Hjørring, where he had previously been head coach of the club's first team from 2007 to 2011. He was also a coach at Nordjyllands Sportscollege.
