= Henrik Jensen (footballer, born 1959) =

Danish footballer and manager (born 1959)

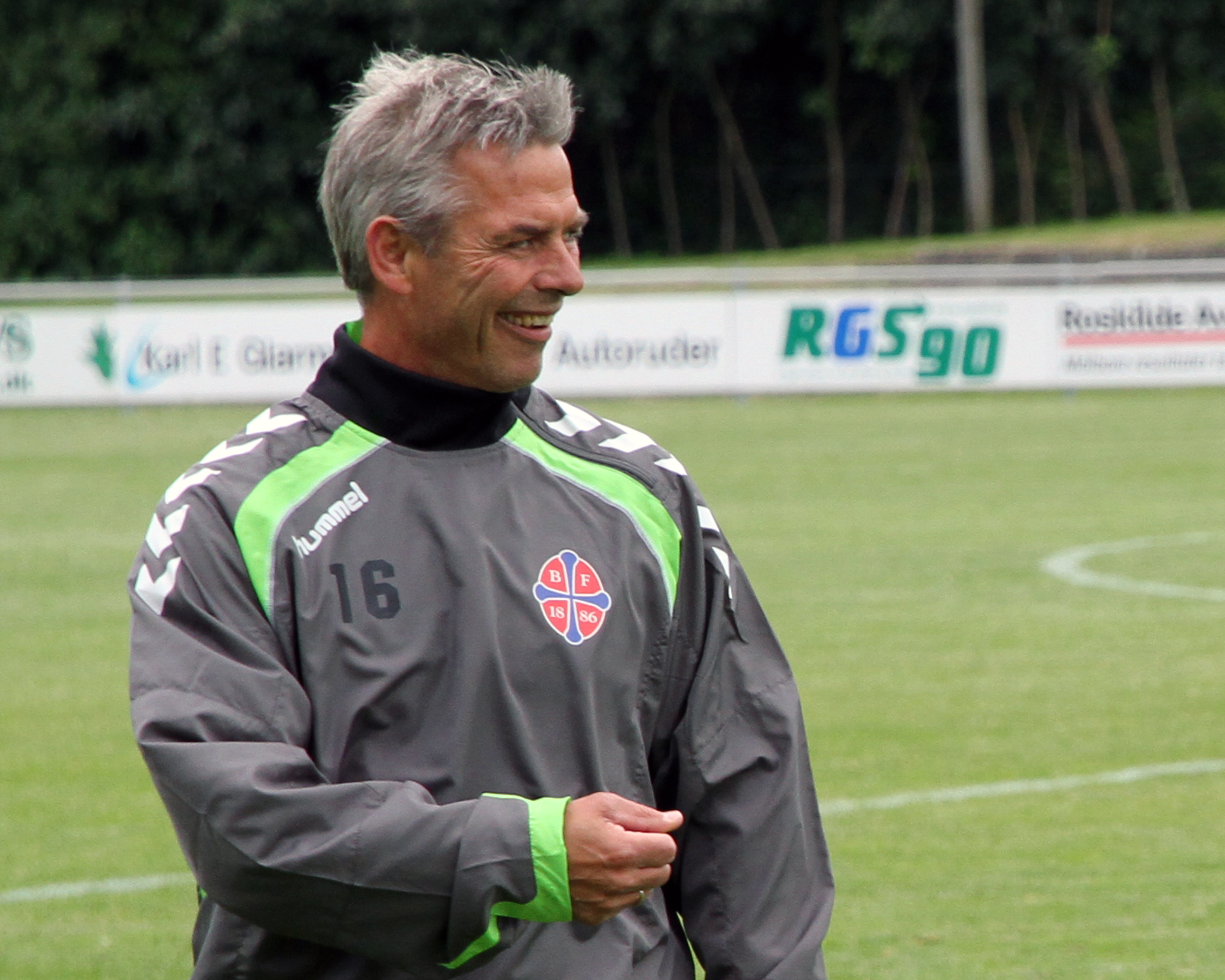
- Jensen coaching BK Frem in 2012

Personal information
- Date of birth: October 25, 1959 (age 67)
- Place of birth: Copenhagen, Denmark
- Height: 1.78 m (5 ft 10 in)
- Position: Forward

Senior career*
Years	Team	Apps	(Gls)
?–1980	Vanløse IF		
1980–1985	Hvidovre IF		
1985–1996	Brøndby IF	278	(?)

International career
1975–1976	Denmark U-17	6	(1)
1975–1977	Denmark U-19	25	(9)
1978	Denmark U-21	1	(0)
1982	Denmark	1	(0)

Managerial career
- 1997–1999: Brøndby (asst)
- 1999–2003: Køge Boldklub
- 2003–2005: Akademisk Boldklub
- 2005–2007: Brøndby W
- 2007–2008: Brøndby (asst)
- 2009: AC Horsens
- 2010–2011: Brøndby
- 2012–2014: BK Frem
- * Club domestic league appearances and goals

Henrik Jensen (Danish pronunciation: [ˈhenˀʁek ˈjensn̩]; born 25 October 1959) is a Danish former football player and manager. He managed Danish Superliga club Brøndby IF between 2010 and 2011, and Boldklubben Frem of the 2nd Division between 2012 and 2014.

Henrik Jensen is the father of former APOEL player Mike Jensen.

== Career ==
Jensen spent his active career with Danish clubs Vanløse IF, Hvidovre IF, and Brøndby IF, winning the Danish championship with Brøndby. He played one game for the Denmark national football team in June 1982.

Jensen has managed Superliga clubs Køge Boldklub, Akademisk Boldklub, and AC Horsens, being relegated with all three clubs. On 26 March 2010 Brøndby IF officials hired the coach to replace Kent Nielsen, who had been dismissed following the 1–3 home defeat against HB Køge the day before.

He was sacked as manager of Brøndby on 24 October 2011 following a miserable start of the 2011-12 season.

In June 2012 he was named new manager of Boldklubben Frem in the Danish 2nd Divisions. He left the club by mutual consent on 29 April 2014.
