= Malene Marquard =

Danish footballer (born 1983)

Personal information
- Full name: Malene Marquard Olsen
- Date of birth: 2 February 1983 (age 43)
- Place of birth: Denmark
- Height: 1.71 m (5 ft 7 1/2 in)
- Position: Centre back

Youth career
- 1989–1997: Hedehusene IK
- 1997–2001: Brøndby

Senior career*
Years	Team	Apps	(Gls)
2001–2014	Brøndby	240+	(5+)
2009	Tyresö FF		

International career
1999–2000	Denmark U17	7	(0)
2002	Denmark U19	9	(0)
2003	Denmark U21	6	(0)
2003–2013	Denmark	14	(0)
- * Club domestic league appearances and goals

Malene Marquard Olsen (born 2 February 1983) is a Danish nurse and former football defender who played for the Danish national team. At club level Marquard spent most of her active playing career with A-Liga club Brøndby and also captained the side.

== Club career ==
Olsen began her club career at Hedehusene IK. As of September 2012, Olsen had made the second most appearances for Brøndby with 247. Only Mia Brogaard had more with 327.

In 2009 Olsen played for Swedish club Tyresö FF, while working as a nurse in Stockholm.

== International career ==
Olsen made her debut for the senior Denmark national team in February 2003; a 4–0 defeat to Norway in La Manga Club. In October 2011 Olsen was recalled to the national team after a five-year absence, for a UEFA European Championship 2013 qualifying tie with Austria. She was named in national coach Kenneth Heiner-Møller's squad for the final tournament, where Denmark reached the semi-finals. Olsen retired from football in June 2014.

== After football ==
In addition to her work as a nurse, Marquard worked as an expert commentator for DR and TV 2.
