= 1998–99 Danish Elite Division =

Danish women's football league season

Danish Elite Division
- Season: 1998–99
- Dates: August 1998—June 1999
- Champions: Fortuna Hjørring; 4th title
- Runner up: HEI
- Relegated: Brøndby; B52/Aalborg
- Matches: 112
- Goals: 454 (4.05 per match)
- Top goalscorer: Mette Jokumsen; Merete Pedersen; Lene Madsen (28 goals each)
- Only matches in the regular season and the championship play-offs are covered in the statistics

The 1998–99 Danish Elite Division was the 25th season of the top-flight of the Danish Women's Football League. HEI were the defending champions, and Fortuna Hjørring won its 4th league title.

== Teams ==
=== Changes ===
LEAGUE ENTRIES	LEAGUE EXITS
▲ from 1997–98 1st Division	▼ to 1998–99 1st Division
B52/Aalborg; Frederiksberg	Kolding IF; Vorup

=== Stadiums and locations ===
Locations of the 1998–99 Danish Elite Division teams.

Team	Location	Stadium	Capacity
B52/Aalborg	Aalborg		
Brøndby IF	Brøndby		
Fortuna Hjørring	Hjørring		
Frederiksberg	Frederiksberg		
HEI	Aarhus		
Hillerød	Hillerød		
OB	Odense		
Rødovre	Rødovre		

=== Personnel and kits ===
Team	Manager	Captain	Kit	Sponsor	Sponsor
B52	(Denmark) Keld Skov Pedersen				
Brøndby	(Denmark)				
Fortuna Hjørring	(Denmark) Jacob Nørgaard				
Frederiksberg	(Denmark)				
HEI	(Denmark) Hugo Eskesen				
Hillerød	(Denmark)				
OB	(Denmark) Erling Thomsen				
Rødovre	(Denmark)				

== League table ==
Pos	Team	Pld	W	D	L	GF	GA	GD	Pts	Qualification
1	Fortuna Hjørring	28	22	2	4	99	31	+68	68	1999–00 Elite Division
2	HEI	28	22	1	5	94	26	+68	67	1999–00 Elite Division
3	OB	28	18	3	7	73	42	+31	57	1999–00 Elite Division
4	Frederiksberg	28	11	4	13	56	52	+4	37	1999–00 Elite Division
5	Rødovre	28	10	1	17	38	77	−39	31	1999–00 Elite Division
6	Hillerød	28	8	3	17	37	62	−25	27	1999–00 Elite Division
7	Brøndby	28	6	3	19	30	85	−55	21	1999–00 1st Division
8	B52/Aalborg	28	5	3	20	27	79	−52	18	1999–00 1st Division

Rules for classification: 1) Points; 2) Goal difference; 3) Goals scored; 4) Away goals scored; 5) Play-off (played on neutral ground if determining teams for different rounds); 6) Draw.

=== Results ===
Home \ Away	B52	BRØ	HJØ	FRB	HEI	HIL	ODE	RØD
B52/Aalborg		0–2	0–2	1–2	0–9	1–0	1–3	
B52/Aalborg		2–2	0–4	2–0				
Brøndby	2–0		1–5	2–2	0–9	1–2	1–0	1–2
Brøndby	4–3		0–6				0–1	
Fortuna Hjørring	5–0			3–1	0–3	4–1	4–1	8–1
Fortuna Hjørring						1–0	1–1	3–2
Frederiksberg	1–3	5–1	1–6			2–1	5–1	2–3
Frederiksberg			2–3			3–1	1–5	3–0
HEI	3–0	3–2	2–3	1–3		3–1	2–1	4–0
HEI	3–1	5–0		2–1		6–1	5–1	
Hillerød	2–1	3–0	1–6	1–1	1–4		1–4	0–2
Hillerød	3–0	2–1			0–1			
OB	7–0	3–0	0–2	5–0	0–4	2–1		5–2
OB				1–1				3–1
Rødovre	2–2	2–0	1–5	2–0	0–7	2–4	0–4	
Rødovre	1–2	1–2	2–8		2–1			

Legend: Blue = home team win; Yellow = draw; Red = away team win.
