= Brian Sørensen =

Danish football coach (born 1980)

Personal information
- Date of birth: 15 July 1980 (age 46)
- Place of birth: Arden, Denmark

Managerial career
- Years: Team
- 2009–2012: IK Skovbakken
- 2012–2018: Fortuna Hjørring
- 2019–2021: Nordsjælland Women
- 2021–2022: Fortuna Hjørring
- 2022–2026: Everton Women
- 2026–: Republic of Ireland Women (assistant)
- 2026–: Aston Villa Women (caretaker)

Brian Sørensen (Danish: [ˈpʁiːæn ˈsɶɐ̯ˀn̩sn̩]; born 15 July 1980) is a Danish professional football coach who is currently a technical advisor and caretaker manager at Women's Super League club Aston Villa.

== Coaching career ==
Sørensen moved to Fortuna Hjørring in July 2012, after being coach in IK Skovbakken. He was an important part of Fortuna's success in the Danish women's football and UEFA Women's Champions League, winning the Danish Championship in 2014 and 2016 and reaching the quarter-finals in the 2016–17 UEFA Women's Champions League. In February 2018, he quit the club after six years to live in the United States with his wife and footballer Camilla Kur Larsen. The team were in first place at the time and went on to finish 2017–18 Elitedivisionen winners.

Sørensen joined FC Nordsjælland in December 2018 as part of the staff and was elected as new head coach in July 2019. The team were promoted to the Elitedivisionen for the 2019–20 season, where they finished in 3rd place and won the Danish Cup.

At the conclusion of his contract, Sørensen agreed a return to Fortuna Hjørring ahead of the 2021–22 season. He led the team to second place league finish and qualification for the 2022–23 UEFA Women's Champions League.

On 8 April 2022, Women's Super League team Everton announced the appointment of Sørensen on an initial two-year contract ahead of the 2022–23 WSL season. He replaced caretaker manager Chris Roberts who had been serving in that role since the dismissal of Jean-Luc Vasseur. He signed a new two-year contract in April 2024. Sørensen was awarded the Barclays Women’s Super League Manager of the Month for May 2024 after a 2–1 win against Brighton & Hove Albion and a 1–1 draw with Arsenal. On 4 February 2026, it was announced that Sørensen had left the club with immediate effect, having won just three out of fourteen league matches during the 2025–26 season.

On 10 March 2026, Women's Super League club Aston Villa announced the appointment of Sørensen as a technical advisor.

On 21 September 2026, it was announced by the Football Association of Ireland that Sørensen would be joining the Republic of Ireland Women’s National Team coaching staff for their 2027 World Cup qualifying playoff matches.

On 29 September 2026, Aston Villa sacked manager Natalia Arroyo, and Sørensen was placed in caretaker charge until a new manager was appointed. On 16 October, Aston Villa announced that Sørensen would remain as interim head coach until the end of the season.

== Honours ==
=== Manager ===
==== IK Skovbakken ====
- Danish Women's Cup: 2009

==== Fortuna Hjørring ====
- Elitedivisionen: 2014, 2016
- Danish Women's Cup: 2016; runners-up: 2013, 2015

==== FC Nordsjælland ====
- Danish Women's Cup: 2020
