= Peer Lisdorf =

Danish footballer and coach (born 1967)

Personal information
- Date of birth: 31 March 1967
- Place of birth: Germany
- Height: 1.82 m (6 ft 0 in)
- Position: Left midfielder

Youth career
- 1985-1986: Brøndby IF U19

Senior career*
Years	Team	Apps	(Gls)
1986-1987	Brøndby IF		
1987–1993	Frem		
1993	Brøndby IF		
1993–1994	B.93		

Managerial career
- 2010–2014: Brøndby W
- 2019: BSF W
- 2020–2021: HB Køge W
- 2022–2023: FC Thy-Thisted Q
- 2024: B.93 W
- 2025: OB Q
- * Club domestic league appearances and goals

Peer Lisdorf (born 31 March 1967) is a Danish football coach and former footballer who played as a left midfielder, right midfielder, and a centre-forward. He played professionally for first-tier football team Brøndby IF and participated in both the UEFA Europa League and UEFA Champions League. Having played for Brøndby IF, he later became the assistant manager of the team in 2012. Lisdorf most recently coached A-Liga side OB Q in 2025.

== Club career ==
Lisdorf was born in Germany and started his footballing career in Denmark's Brøndby IF's youth team. From his position as a midfielder, Peer moved onto the professional team, Brøndby IF, in the highest Danish league. Peer was a young talent, scoring the first goal in his debut, and was awarded a sponsorship car before he could even legally drive. For each debut Peer made throughout his career, the team he was in either won or drew. In addition, every game played by Lisdorf in the UEFA Champions League, in which he was mostly in the starting eleven, resulted in a win or a draw.

== Management career ==
After retiring from playing association football in 2001, Peer trained to become a coach and was granted a UEFA Pro Licence. He became the assistant manager of Brøndby IF under the head coach, Aurelijus Skarbalius, until 2013. Peer Lisdorf also became head coach of the Brøndby IF's women's team, in Denmark's highest-league football division, Elitedivisionen. Under Lisdorf's management, the team enjoyed huge success, winning the league four times. Lisdorf later moved on to manage Ballerup-Skovlunde Fodbold, and after this, became the coach for HB Køge's women's team (HB Køge Kvindeelite). Even though it was HB Køge Kvindeelite's first time in the Elitedivisionen, Lisdorf led them to win the title (the first in their entire history), and even led them to the Champions League qualification. After winning the Danish championship, the team ran off the pitch, picked up Lisdorf and carried him onto the pitch, bringing him multiple beers and chanting his name.

== Private life ==
Peer has two younger brothers, Bjørn and Jens, who are twins. His younger brother, Bjørn, also played professional football for some time, and is now a live streamer and an associate of Ice Poseidon. Jens has been known to occasionally appear on Bjørn's livestreams.
