= 2018–19 Danish Women's League =

Danish League
- Season: 2018–19
- Champions: Brøndby
- UEFA Women's Champions League: Brøndby; Fortuna Hjørring
- Matches: 86

The 2018–19 Danish League is the 47th season of the highest women's football league in Denmark and is currently contested by 8 teams each year in Denmark. Fortuna Hjørring are the defending champions.

== Main round ==
Teams play each other twice. Top six advance to the championship round.

Pos	Team	Pld	W	D	L	GF	GA	GD	Pts	Qualification
1	Brøndby IF	14	13	1	0	64	5	+59	40	Championship Round
2	Fortuna Hjørring	14	11	2	1	47	10	+37	35	Championship Round
3	VSK Aarhus	14	8	0	6	27	31	−4	24	Championship Round
4	Ballerup-Skovlunde Fodbold	14	7	3	4	20	25	−5	24	Championship Round
5	KoldingQ	14	7	1	6	31	26	+5	22	Championship Round
6	FC Thy-Thisted Q	14	2	2	10	21	43	−22	8	Championship Round
7	Odense Q	14	2	1	11	16	44	−28	7	Relegation Round
8	B.93	14	0	2	12	7	49	−42	2	Relegation Round

Updated to match(es) played on July 23, 2019. Source: DBU
Rules for classification: 1) Points; 2) Goal difference; 3) Number of goals scored; 4) Head-to-head points; 5) Head-to-head goal difference; 6) Head-to-head away goals scored

== Championship round ==
Teams play ten more matches. Points are reset, but bonus points are awarded for the placement in the main round. 10 points for first place, 8 points for second place and then 6, 4, 2 and 0.

Pos	Team	Pld	W	D	L	GF	GA	GD	Pts	Qualification or relegation
1	Brøndby	10	8	1	1	36	9	+27	35	Qualification to Champions League
2	Fortuna Hjørring	10	7	3	0	28	6	+22	32	Qualification to Champions League
3	VSK Aarhus	10	4	2	4	17	21	−4	20	
4	Ballerup-Skovlunde Fodbold	10	2	2	6	11	31	−20	12	
5	KoldingQ	10	2	2	6	12	34	−22	10	
6	FC Thy-Thisted Q	10	2	0	8	12	25	−13	6	

Updated to match(es) played on 15 August 2019. Source:
Rules for classification: 1) Points; 2) Goal difference; 3) Number of goals scored

== Top scorers ==
As of 23 July 2019

Source: Betxpert.com

Rank	Player	Club	Goals
1	(Denmark) Nanna Christiansen	Brøndby IF	20
2	(Denmark) Nicoline Sørensen	Brøndby IF	11
2	(Denmark) Amalie Thestrup	Ballerup-Skovlunde	11
4	(Denmark) Signe Boysen	KoldingQ	9
4	(Brazil) Tamires	Fortuna Hjørring	9
4	(Denmark) Caroline Møller	Fortuna Hjørring	9
7	(Denmark) Mille Gejl	Brøndby IF	8
7	(Denmark) Sif Rykær	KoldingQ	8
9	(Finland) Sanni Franssi	Fortuna Hjørring	7
9	(Denmark) Tenna Kappel	Odense Q	7
9	(Denmark) Malene Sørensen	Thy-Thisted	7
