= Fortuna Hjørring =

Danish women's association football team

- Short name: Fortuna
- Founded: 28 October 1966; 60 years ago
- Ground: Nord Energi Arena
- Capacity: 10,000
- Chairman: Karina Bech Jensen
- Coach: Niclas Hougaard
- League: A-Liga
- 2025–26: A-Liga, 3rd of 8
- Website: Fortuna Hjørring
| Home colours | Away colours |

Fortuna Hjørring is a Danish women's football team based in Hjørring, Denmark. The team competes in the A-Liga, the top flight of the Danish Women's Football League. The club was founded in 1966 and play in green and white. It is one of the most prolific clubs in the Danish A-Liga, having won the league 12 times, tied for most wins alongside rivals Brøndby. The 2024–25 season saw Fortuna Hjørring win "The Double", taking home both the league trophy and the Danish Cup.

Fortuna are fixtures of the UEFA Women's Champions League, having competed 16 times. In the 2009–10 season, they defeated Italian side Bardolino in the round of 32, but lost the round of 16 to eventual finalists Lyon. In the 2016–17 season they reached their best result in recent club history, when they made it to the quarter-finals which they lost 0–2 on aggregate to Manchester City. Fortuna's biggest European result to date is the 2002–03 UEFA Women's Cup final, where they ultimately lost 1–7 on aggregate to Umeå IK.

== History ==
On 6 February 1977 the club was renamed from BK Frem to BK Fortuna.

== Players ==
=== Current squad ===
As of 1 October 2026

Note: Flags indicate national team as defined under FIFA eligibility rules; some limited exceptions apply. Players may hold more than one non-FIFA nationality.

| No. | Pos. | Nation | Player |
|---|---|---|---|
| 1 | GK | DEN | Freja Thisgaard |
| 3 | DF | SWE | Sara Olai |
| 4 | MF | DEN | Sofie Junge Pedersen |
| 5 | MF | DEN | Johanne Guldbæk |
| 6 | DF | COL | Samantha Rodríguez |
| 7 | FW | DEN | Josefine Valvik |
| 8 | MF | DEN | Pernille Pedersen |
| 9 | FW | DEN | Sarah Dyrehauge |
| 11 | MF | ROU | Florentina Olar (captain) |
| 12 | GK | ROU | Andreea Părăluță |
| 13 | FW | USA | Lumy Kostmayer |
| 14 | FW | SWE | Emma Westin |
| 15 | DF | DEN | Rie Skotte |
| 16 | GK | DEN | Laura Jensen |
| 17 | DF | NGR | Oyinlola Shakirat Olamide |
| 19 | DF | DEN | Laura Frank |
| 20 | FW | DEN | Rebekka Frederiksen |

| No. | Pos. | Nation | Player |
|---|---|---|---|
| 21 | MF | DEN | Signe Carstens |
| 22 | DF | USA | Kaitlyn Parcell |
| 24 | FW | JPN | Risako Watanabe |
| 25 | MF | USA | Ashley Riefner |
| 31 | MF | DEN | Olivia Krogsgaard |
| 33 | GK | DEN | Julie Langstrup |
| 35 | DF | DEN | Frida Frederiksen |
| 53 | MF | DEN | Astrid Westergaard |
| 64 | DF | DEN | Mille Thomsen |
| 66 | MF | USA | Janelle Cordia |
| 76 | FW | DEN | Emma Lynnerup |
| 77 | MF | DEN | Ida Sort |
| 86 | DF | DEN | Carla Domino |
| 87 | MF | DEN | Anna Pallesen |
| — | FW | DEN | Tilde Andersen |
| — | MF | DEN | Emilie Pilgaard |
| — | MF | DEN | Sara Røge |

=== Player records ===
==== Caps ====
As of 28 March 2026

| # | Nat. | Player | Caps |
|---|---|---|---|
| 1 | (Denmark) | Lene Filholm | 418 |
| 2 | (Denmark) | Dorthe Larsen | 396 |
| 3 | (Denmark) | Janne Madsen | 390 |
| 4 | (Denmark) | Christina Petersen | 352 |
| 5 | (Denmark) | Jette Andersen | 348 |
| 6 | (Denmark) | Hanne Sand | 342 |
| 7 | (Denmark) | Birgit Christensen | 321 |
| 8 | (Denmark) | Anne-Mette Christensen | 316 |
| 9 | (Denmark) | Lene Madsen | 315 |
| 10 | (Denmark) | Mette V. Jensen | 307 |

==== Goals ====
As of 2016

| # | Nat. | Player | Goals |
|---|---|---|---|
| 1 | (Denmark) | Lene Madsen | 357 |

=== Captains ===
Incomplete

| Years | Player |
|---|---|
| 2022– | (Romania) Florentina Olar |
| 2022 | (Denmark) Camilla Kur |
| 2021 | (Denmark) Laura Frank |
| 2020–2021 | (Denmark) Sara Thrige |
| 2019–2020 | (Denmark) Caroline Rask |
| 2018–2019 | (United States) Janelle Cordia |
| 2017– | (Denmark) Charlotte Sørensen |
| 2016–2017 | (Romania) Florentina Olar |
| 2015–2016 | (Denmark) Line Sigvardsen Jensen |
| 2014–2015 | (Denmark) Sofie Junge |
| –2014 | (Denmark) Janni Arnth |
| | (Denmark) Birgit Brasholt |

== Management ==
=== First team ===
As of 4 August 2026

| Position | Staff |
|---|---|
| Head Coach | (Denmark) Niclas Hougaard |
| Assistant Coach | (Denmark) Mariann Gajhede Knudsen |
| Goalkeeper Coach | (Denmark) Kristoffer Skjærlund |
| Fitness Coach | (Slovakia) Katarína Janickova |
| Head of Coaching | (Faroe Islands) Claus Bech Jørgensen |
| Team Coordinator | (Denmark) Anne-Mette Christensen |
Medical staff
| Team Doctor | (Netherlands) Boukje Veenstra |
| Physiotherapist | (Denmark) Jeanet Chortsen |

=== Club ===
| Position | Staff |
|---|---|
| Sporting Director | (United States) Janelle Cordia |

=== Managers ===
| Years | Coach |
|---|---|
| 2026– | (Denmark) Niclas Hougaard |
| 2023–2026 | (Denmark) Lene Terp |
| 2022–2023 | (Denmark) Bo Zinck |
| 2022 | (Denmark) Martin Møller Kristensen |
| 2021–2022 | (Denmark) Brian Sørensen |
| 2019–2021 | (Denmark) Niclas Hougaard |
| 2018–2019 | (United States) Carrie Kveton |
| 2012–2017 | (Denmark) Brian Sørensen |
| 2011–2012 | (Denmark) Jakob Borup |
| 2008–2011 | (Denmark) Flemming Nielsen |
| 2005–2007 | (Norway) Odd Einar Fossum |
| 2004–2005 | (Norway) Eli Landsem |
| 2002–2003 | (Denmark) Steen Refsgaard |
| 2002 | (Denmark) Jacob Nørgaard |
| 2000–2001 | (Denmark) Jens Overgaard |
| 1999 | (Denmark) Alex Høeg |
| 1997–1999 | (Denmark) Jacob Nørgaard |
| 1995–1996 | (Denmark) Steen Andersen |
| 1994–1995 | (Denmark) Ove Christensen |
| 1992–1993 | (Denmark) Jens Mathisen |
| 1991 | (Denmark) Finn Jønsson |
| 1989–1990 | (Denmark) Jacob Nørgaard |
| 1985–1988 | (Denmark) Ove Christensen |
| 1983–1984 | (Denmark) Jens Larsen |
| 1982 | (Denmark) Erik Amping |
| 1979–1981 | (Denmark) John Robert Larsen |
| 1978 | (Denmark) Carsten Lauritsen |
| 1972–1977 | (Denmark) John Robert Larsen |

Source: "PIGER i GRØNT". Issuu (in Danish). 2016-11-01. p. 64.

== Honours ==
Incomplete

| Honour | No. | Years |
DOMESTIC
| A-Liga | 12 | (gold) 1993–94 • 1994–95 • 1995–96 • 1998–99 • 2001–02 • 2008–09 • 2009–10 • 2013–14 • 2016–17 • 2017–18 • 2019–20 • 2024–25 |
| A-Liga | 13 | (silver) 2000–01 • 2002–03 • 2003–04 • 2004–05 • 2005–06 • 2006–07 • 2007–08 • 2011–12 • 2012–13 • 2014–15 • 2016–17 • 2017–18 • 2021–22 |
| Danish Cup | 11 | (gold) 1994–95 • 1995–96 • 1999–00 • 2000–01 • 2001–02 • 2005–06 • 2007–08 • 2015–16 • 2018–19 • 2021–22 • 2024–25 |
| Danish Cup | 8 | (silver) 1997–98 • 2004–05 • 2006–07 • 2008–09 • 2010–11 • 2012–13 • 2014–15 • 2022–23 |
EUROPEAN
| UEFA Cup | 1 | (silver) 2002–03 |
| Nordic Championship | 2 | (gold) 1995 • 1996 |

=== Indoor ===
| Honour | No. | Years |
|---|---|---|
| Danish Indoor Cup | 4 | (gold) 1994 • 1997 • 1999 • 2001 |
| Danish Futsal Championship | 6 | (gold) 2008 • 2013 • 2014 • 2016 • 2017 • 2018 |
| Danish Futsal Championship | 1 | (silver) 2015 |

== Seasons ==
As of the 2025–26 season

Key
| (gold) Champions | Promotion |
| (silver) Silver | Relegation |
| (bronze) Bronze | |

Incomplete

| Season | Tier | # | W | D | L | F | A | Pts. | Cup | UCL |
|---|---|---|---|---|---|---|---|---|---|---|
| DIVISION WEST (2nd of 2) (Note: The league was originally divided into two groups of 10 teams, representing the east and the west of the country.) | | | | | | | | | —N/a | —N/a |
| 1975 | 1 | 3rd of 10 | | | | 38 | 28 | 24 | —N/a | —N/a |
| 1976 | 1 | 5th of 10 | | | | 35 | 33 | 18 | —N/a | —N/a |
| 1977 | 1 | 4th of 10 | | | | 31 | 36 | 17 | —N/a | —N/a |
| 1978 | 1 | 10th of 10 | | | | 17 | 36 | 9 | —N/a | —N/a |
| 1979 | 5 (Note: The Regional Denmark Series (non-league), which is now the 5th tier, was the 2nd tier, until the Denmark Series (4th tier; non-league) was established in 1981.) | 1st of 10 | | | | 59 | 15 | 29 | —N/a | —N/a |
| 1980 | 1 | 2nd of 10 | | | | 36 | 19 | 25 | —N/a | —N/a |
| SINGLE-DIVISION LEAGUE (Note: From the 1981 season onwards, the league was changed to a single division encompassing the 12 best teams from across the country.) | | | | | | | | | —N/a | —N/a |
| 1981 | 1 | | | | | 52 | 41 | 23 | —N/a | —N/a |
| 1982 | 1 | | | | | | | | —N/a | —N/a |
| 1983 | 1 | | | | | | | | —N/a | —N/a |
| 1984 | 1 | | | | | | | | —N/a | —N/a |
| 1985 | 1 | | | | | | | | —N/a | —N/a |
| 1986 | 1 | | | | | | | | —N/a | —N/a |
| 1987 | 1 | | | | | | | | —N/a | —N/a |
| 1988 | 1 | | | | | | | | —N/a | —N/a |
| 1989 | 1 | | | | | | | | —N/a | —N/a |
| 1990 | 1 | | | | | | | | —N/a | —N/a |
| 1991 | 1 | | | | | | | | —N/a | —N/a |
| 1992 | 1 | | | | | | | | —N/a | —N/a |
| 1993 | 1 | | | | | | | | | —N/a |
| 1994 | 1 | | | | | | | | | —N/a |
| 1995 | 1 | 1st of 8 | 25 | 2 | 1 | 189 | 18 | 77 | 1st | —N/a |
| 1996 | 1 | | | | | | | | 1st | —N/a |
| 1996–97 | 1 | 2nd of 8 | 20 | 1 | 7 | 118 | 47 | 61 | | —N/a |
| 1997–98 | 1 | 2nd of 8 | 21 | 4 | 3 | 100 | 30 | 67 | | —N/a |
| 1998–99 | 1 | | | | | | | | | —N/a |
| 1999–00 | 1 | 2nd of 8 | 18 | 2 | 6 | 112 | 40 | 56 | 1st | —N/a |
| 2000–01 | 1 | 2nd of 8 | 17 | 5 | 6 | 78 | 40 | 56 | 1st | —N/a |
| 2001–02 | 1 | 1st of 8 | 22 | 3 | 3 | 133 | 36 | 69 | 1st | |
| 2002–03 | 1 | 2nd of 8 | 16 | 0 | 5 | 76 | 16 | 48 | | 2nd |
| 2003–04 | 1 | 2nd of 8 | 18 | 0 | 3 | 65 | 22 | 54 | | |
| 2004–05 | 1 | 2nd of 8 | 18 | 1 | 2 | 95 | 16 | 55 | | |
| 2005–06 | 1 | 2nd of 8 | 17 | 2 | 2 | 73 | 16 | 53 | 1st | |
| 2006–07 | 1 | 2nd of 8 | 16 | 3 | 2 | 77 | 9 | 51 | | |
| 2007–08 | 1 | 2nd of 10 | 15 | 1 | 2 | 79 | 12 | 46 | 1st | |
| 2008–09 | 1 | 1st of 10 | 17 | 0 | 1 | 82 | 7 | 51 | | |
| 2009–10 | 1 | 1st of 10 | 16 | 2 | 0 | 74 | 5 | 50 | | R16 |
| 2010–11 | 1 | 1st of 10 | 17 | 0 | 1 | 82 | 12 | 51 | | R16 |
| 2011–12 | 1 | 2nd of 10 | 15 | 1 | 2 | 84 | 19 | 69 | | R16 |
| 2012–13 | 1 | 2nd of 10 | 4 | 1 | 1 | 11 | 8 | 36 | 2nd | R16 |
| 2013–14 | 1 | 1st of 8 | 8 | 0 | 2 | 31 | 4 | 44 | SF | R16 |
| 2014–15 | 1 | 2nd of 8 | 6 | 1 | 3 | 22 | 18 | 43 | 2nd | R16 |
| 2015–16 | 1 | 1st of 8 | 9 | 0 | 1 | 45 | 10 | 45 | 1st | R16 |
| 2016–17 | 1 | 2nd of 8 | 7 | 3 | 0 | 24 | 5 | 32 | SF | QF |
| 2017–18 | 1 | 1st of 8 | 9 | 0 | 1 | 30 | 7 | 37 | QF | R32 |
| 2018–19 | 1 | 2nd of 8 | 7 | 3 | 0 | 28 | 6 | 32 | 1st | R32 |
| 2019–20 (Note: The season was shortened due to the COVID-19 pandemic.) | 1 | 1st of 8 | 4 | 1 | 0 | 9 | 2 | 23 | SF | R16 |
| 2020–21 | 1 | 3rd of 8 | 4 | 2 | 4 | 13 | 17 | 20 | QF | R16 |
| 2021–22 | 1 | 2nd of 8 | 6 | 1 | 3 | 57 | 27 | 52 | 1st | —N/a |
| 2022–23 | 1 | 3rd of 8 | 7 | 1 | 2 | 40 | 24 | 44 | 2nd | —N/a |
| 2023–24 | 1 | 4th of 8 | 9 | 8 | 7 | 28 | 19 | 35 | QF | —N/a |
| 2024–25 | 1 | 1st of 8 | 4 | 4 | 2 | 52 | 17 | 52 | 1st | —N/a |
| 2025–26 | 1 | 3rd of 8 | 4 | 0 | 6 | 37 | 21 | 41 | 2nd round | —N/a |
| 2026–27 | 1 | Season in progress | | | | | | | | —N/a |

Notes

Sources

- "Stillinger og resultater". DBU (in Danish).
- "Stillinger og resultater fra alverdens fodboldligaer". Tipsbladet.dk (in Danish).
- "Fortuna Hjørring Scrapbog 1975". Issuu. 2017-11-02. p. 7.
- "Fortuna Hjørring Scrapbog 1976". Issuu. 2017-11-02. p. 12.
- "Fortuna Hjørring Scrapbog 1977". Issuu. 2017-12-15.
- "Fortuna Hjørring Scrapbog 1978". Issuu. 2017-12-15.

== European ==
Results list Fortuna Hjørring's goal tally first

=== Champions League (2001–) ===
==== Competition ====
| Season | Stage | Opponent | Result | |
UEFA CUP
| 2002–03 | QF | (Norway) Trondheim | 2–2; 1–0 | 3–2 |
| 2002–03 | SF | (England) Arsenal | 3–1; 5–1 | 8–2 |
| 2002–03 | Final | (Sweden) Umeå | 1–4; 0–3 | 1–7 |
CHAMPIONS LEAGUE
| 2009–10 | R32 | (Italy) Verona | 4–0; 1–2 | 5–2 |
| 2009–10 | R16 | (France) Lyon | 0–1; 0–5 | 0–6 |
| 2010–11 | R32 | (Italy) Verona | 8–0; 6–1 | 14–1 |
| 2010–11 | R16 | (Germany) Duisburg | 2–4; 0–3 | 2–7 |
| 2011–12 | R32 | (Switzerland) Young Boys | 3–0; 2–1 | 5–1 |
| 2011–12 | R16 | (Sweden) Kopparbergs/Göteborg | 0–1; 2–3 | 2–4 |
| 2012–13 | R32 | (Scotland) Glasgow City | 2–1; 0–0 | 2–1 |
| 2012–13 | R16 | (Sweden) Kopparbergs/Göteborg | 1–1; 2–3 | 3–4 |
| 2013–14 | R32 | (Italy) Tavagnacco | 2–3; 2–0 | 4–3 |
| 2013–14 | R16 | (Sweden) Tyresö | 1–2; 0–4 | 1–6 |
| 2014–15 | R32 | (Portugal) Ourém | 3–0; 6–0 | 9–0 |
| 2014–15 | R16 | (Sweden) Rosengård | 1–2; 0–2 | 1–4 |
| 2015–16 | R32 | (Belarus) FC Minsk | 2–0; 4–0 | 6–0 |
| 2015–16 | R16 | (Italy) Brescia | 0–1; 1–1 | 1–2 |
| 2016–17 | R32 | (Spain) Athletic Bilbao | 1–2; 3–1 ^{a.e.t.} | 4–3 |
| 2016–17 | R16 | (Italy) Brescia | 1–0; 3–1 | 4–1 |
| 2016–17 | QF | (England) Manchester City | 0–1; 0–1 | 0–2 |
| 2017–2018 | R32 | (Italy) Fiorentina | 1–2; 0–0 | 1–2 |
| 2018–2019 | R32 | (Italy) Fiorentina | 0–2; 0–2 | 0–4 |
| 2019–20 | R32 | (Albania) Vllaznia | 1–0; 2–0 | 3–0 |
| 2019–20 | R16 | (France) Lyon | 0–4; 0–7 | 0–11 |
| 2020–21 | R32 | (Slovenia) Pomurje | 3–0; 3–2 | 6–2 |
| 2020–21 | R16 | (Spain) Barcelona | 0–4; 0–5 | 0–9 |

==== Qualification ====
| Season | Stage | Opponent | Result |
|---|---|---|---|
| 2002–03 | 2nd | (Moldova) Codru Anenii Noi | 5–0 |
| 2002–03 | 2nd | (Iceland) Breiðablik Kópavogur | 9–0 |
| 2002–03 | 2nd | (Belarus) Bobruichanka Bobruisk (H) | 3–0 |
| 2022–23 | 1st | (Germany) Eintracht Frankfurt | 0–2 |
| 2022–23 | 1st | (Sweden) Kristianstad | 2–3 ^{a.e.t.} |
| 2025–26 | 2nd | (Scotland) Hibernian | 2–1 |
| 2025–26 | 2nd | (Austria) Young Boys | 1–0 |
| 2025–26 | 3rd | (Austria) St. Pölten | 1–3; 1–2 |

=== Europa Cup (2025–) ===
==== Qualification ====
| Season | Stage | Opponent | Result |
|---|---|---|---|
| 2026–27 | 1st | (Croatia) Hajduk Split | 2–0; 1–1 |
| 2026–27 | 2nd | (Netherlands) PSV | 0–1; 0–0 |
