= AGF Fodbold (women) =

Danish football club

AGF
- Full name: Aarhus Gymnastikforening
- Nicknames: De hviie (The Whites); Byens hold (The City's Team)
- Short name: AGF
- Founded: 1 July 2020; 6 years ago
- Ground: Vejlby Stadium, Aarhus
- Capacity: 11,500
- Owner: AGF A/S (80%)
- Chairman: Jacob Nielsen
- Coach: Anders Fedder Kristensen
- League: A-Liga
- 2025–26: A-Liga, 5th of 8
- Website: AGF
| Home colours | Away colours |

Aarhus Gymnastikforening Fodbold (commonly known as AGF) is a Danish women's football team based in Aarhus, Denmark. The team competes in the A-Liga, the top flight of the Danish Women's Football League. The club is based on erstwhile VSK Aarhus (now the AGF reserve team). IF Lyseng was part of the original setup until departing in 2024. Historically, the former incarnations of the club, HEI and IK Skovbakken, have been among the most successful in the top division from the '80s until the 2010s.

AGF is the biggest club in Aarhus, the second largest city in Denmark and as such has been criticised for not prioritising the team compared to the men's team, and also comparable to the investments from competitors of similar resources such as Midtjylland. The team is not professional nor does the club have any aspiration to create a professional setup, as head coach Søren Kiilerich explained in a September 2026 interview, stipulating that being part of AGF as a staple in Danish football has no impact on the resources for the women's team. Instead the club strives to be a part-time outfit. Danish broadcaster TV 2 published an article in October 2026 citing multiple sources from the team both former and current who criticised AGF, alleging a lack of support for the women's team, both in financial and sporting investment.

The club is owned by AGF Kvindefodbold ApS, a shareholding company established for this specific purpose, of which AGF A/S owns 80% and VSK Aarhus and IF Lyseng each owned 10% until 2024 where Lyseng left the club, relinquishing its 10% share.

== History ==
Founded in March 2020 as the first ever Aarhus Gymnastikforening women's football club, the team has a long history in the top tier of Danish Women's Football League. The club originated as Hjortshøj-Egå Idrætsforening (HEI) in the 1970s, competing in the first top tier tournament in 1975. HEI were very successful in the 1980s and 1990s, winning six of their hitherto ten league titles in the '80s, with six straight titles from 1986–1991.

In 2001, HEI decided to merge their team with IK Skovbakken, and played their last half-season as HEI that autumn. Skovbakken took home eight bronze medals in the league before merging with Vejlby IK in 2017 to form VSK Aarhus. After three seasons and one bronze medal in the league, VSK then merged with IF Lyseng and AGF in 2020 to create the club as it is known today. The club inherited VSK's license and placement in the league. The goal with the 2020 merger was to create a stronger team representing the region of Aarhus to compete in the top flight of Danish football, with backing from AGF.

== Players ==
=== Current squad ===
As of 16 August 2026

Note: Flags indicate national team as defined under FIFA eligibility rules; some limited exceptions apply. Players may hold more than one non-FIFA nationality.

| No. | Pos. | Nation | Player |
|---|---|---|---|
| 1 | GK | DEN | Marie Gade |
| 4 | MF | DEN | Milla Ahrenholt |
| 5 | DF | DEN | Cecilie Harsløf |
| 6 | DF | DEN | Julie Poulsen |
| 7 | FW | DEN | Cecilie Johansen (captain) |
| 8 | MF | DEN | Sofie Lundberg |
| 9 | FW | DEN | Signe Holt Andersen |
| 10 | FW | DEN | Mathilde Braithwaite |
| 11 | MF | DEN | Line Aarhus |
| 13 | MF | DEN | Dagmar Jørgensen |
| 14 | MF | DEN | Clara Littrup |
| 15 | FW | DEN | Sophia Parkegaard |

| No. | Pos. | Nation | Player |
|---|---|---|---|
| 16 | FW | DEN | Mie Lerche |
| 17 | MF | DEN | Ea Rasmussen |
| 18 | DF | DEN | Laura Guldbjerg |
| 19 | MF | DEN | Sofie Jørgensen |
| 20 | DF | DEN | Johanne Krøger |
| 23 | MF | DEN | Lærke Tingleff |
| 24 | MF | DEN | Silke Larsen |
| 27 | GK | DEN | Johanne Lyngsø |
| 28 | DF | DEN | Alba Jakobsen |
| 29 | MF | DEN | Cecilie Nøhr |
| — | GK | DEN | Maya Dybro |
| — | DF | DEN | Karla Nørgaard |

=== Captains ===
Incomplete

| Years | Player |
|---|---|
| 2026– | (Denmark) Cecilie Johansen |
| –2026 | (Denmark) Sofie Vendelbo |
| | (Denmark) Christina Ravn |
| –2006 | (Denmark) Mia Bak |

== Management ==
=== Coaching ===
As of 1 October 2026

| Role | Name |
|---|---|
| Head Coach; Head of Coaching | Anders Fedder Kristensen |
| Goolkeeping Coach | Søren Holm |
| Fitness Coach | Rasmus Aslak |
| Team Manager | Anja Kjærsgård |
| Team Manager | Lars Pedersen |
| Head of Football Operations | Vibe Schøler |
Medical Staff
| Team Doctor | Jacob Sorwad Outrup |
| Team Doctor | Morten Eaton Mølgaard |
| Physiotherapist | Cecilie Munk Jylov |
| Physiotherapist | Mathias Brun Sørensen |

=== Club ===
| Role | Name |
|---|---|
| Chairman | Jacob Nielsen |
| Head of Football | Jimmy Bonde |

=== Managers ===
Incomplete

| Years | Name |
|---|---|
| 2026– | (Denmark) Anders Fedder Kristensen |
| 2026 | (Denmark) Søren Kiillerich |
| 2025–2026 | (Denmark) Claus Struck |
| 2023–2025 | (Denmark) Michael Schjønberg |
| 2023 | (Denmark) Nichlas Ørbæk Knudsen (interim) (Denmark) Peter Pedersen (interim) |
| 2021–2022 | (Denmark) Katrine Pedersen |
| 2021 | (Denmark) Steen Petterson |
| 2020 (Note: Nim coached the team from the spring championship play-offs until September; Nørgaard and Frederiksen in September and November.) | (Denmark) Allan Nørgaard & Allan Frederiksen (interim) |
| 2020 | (Denmark) Anders Nim |
VSK Aarhus
| 2018–2019 | (Denmark) Hans Paarup |
| 2017–2018 | (Denmark) Henrik Varbøl Andersen |
IK Skovbakken
| 2016–2017 | (Denmark) Henrik Varbøl Andersen |
| 2014–2016 | (Denmark) Kim Leth Andersen |
| 2013 | (Denmark) Peter Pedersen |
| 2012–2013 | (Denmark) Carsten Karkov |
| –2012 | (Denmark) Brian Sørensen |
| 2009– | (Denmark) Axel Lund Petersen |
| 2006–2008 | (Denmark) Jakob Michelsen |
| 2004–2006 | (Denmark) Ole Brandenborg |
| 2002–2004 | (Denmark) Tom Søjberg |
Hjortshøj-Egå (HEI)
| –2002 | (Denmark) Benny Rosenqvist |
| 1998– | (Denmark) Hugo Eskesen |
| 1996–1997 | (Denmark) Troels Bech |
| 1996 | (Denmark) Henriette Jensen (interim) |
| 1996 | (Denmark) Jan Knudsen |
| 1990–1991 | (Denmark) Henriette Jensen & Ove Sass Hansen |
| 1989 | (Norway) Ragner Nielsen |
| –1988 | (Denmark) Poul Højmose |
| | (Denmark) Ernst Beck |

Source: Danish Football Association

== Seasons ==
As of the 2025–26 season

Key
| (gold) Champions | Promotion |
| (silver) Silver | Relegation |
| (bronze) Bronze | |

Incomplete

| Season | Tier | # | W | D | L | F | A | Pts. | Cup |
DIVISION WEST (2nd of 2) (Note: The league was originally divided into two groups of 10 teams, representing the east and the west of the country.)
As Hjortshøj-Egå IF (HEI)
| 1975 | 4 (Note: HEI were promoted into the Denmark Series (the non-league 2nd tier) from the 1975 season, which is now the 4th tier, as a 2nd league tier was established in 1993, and a 3rd tier in 2021.) | | | | | | | | —N/a |
| 1976 | 1 | 6th of 10 | | | | 20 | 38 | 15 | —N/a |
| 1977 | 1 | 6th of 10 | | | | 21 | 24 | 14 | —N/a |
| 1978 | 1 | | | | | | | | —N/a |
| 1979 | 1 | 3rd of 10 | | | | 31 | 20 | 21 | —N/a |
| 1980 | 1 | | | | | | | | —N/a |
SINGLE-DIVISION LEAGUE (Note: From the 1981 season onwards, the league was changed to a single division encompassing the 12 best teams from across the country.)
| 1981 | 1 | | | | | | | | —N/a |
| 1982 | 1 | 1st of 12 | | | | | | | —N/a |
| 1983 | 1 | 2nd of 12 | | | | | | | —N/a |
| 1984 | 1 | 1st of 12 | | | | | | | —N/a |
| 1985 | 1 | 3rd of 12 | | | | | | | —N/a |
| 1986 | 1 | 1st of 12 | | | | | | | —N/a |
| 1987 | 1 | 1st of 12 | | | | | | | —N/a |
| 1988 | 1 | 1st of 12 | | | | | | | —N/a |
| 1989 | 1 | 1st of 12 | | | | | | | —N/a |
| 1990 | 1 | 1st of 12 | | | | | | | —N/a |
| 1991 | 1 | 1st of 12 | | | | | | | —N/a |
| 1992 | 1 | 2nd of 12 | | | | | | | —N/a |
| 1993 | 1 | 3rd | | | | | | | |
| 1994 | 1 | 2nd of 8 | | | | | | | |
| 1995 | 1 | 2nd of 8 | 25 | 2 | 1 | 128 | 7 | 77 | |
| 1996 | 1 | 2nd of 8 | | | | | | | |
| 1996–97 | 1 | 1st of 8 | 26 | 1 | 1 | 157 | 25 | 79 | |
| 1997–98 | 1 | 1st of 8 | 25 | 2 | 1 | 115 | 24 | 77 | |
| 1998–99 | 1 | 2nd of 8 | 22 | 1 | 5 | 94 | 26 | 67 | |
| 1999–00 | 1 | 3rd of 8 | 17 | 4 | 5 | 99 | 31 | 55 | |
| 2000–01 | 1 | 3rd of 8 | 17 | 3 | 8 | 76 | 37 | 54 | |
As IK Skovbakken (Note: For the 2001 autumn, the club was represented by Hjortshøj-Egå IF (HEI), before the team merged with Skovbakken in January 2002 and appeared as Skovbakken thenceforth.)
| 2001–02 | 1 | 3rd of 8 | 19 | 5 | 4 | 112 | 34 | 62 | |
| 2002–03 | 1 | 4th of 8 | 13 | 1 | 7 | 65 | 36 | 40 | |
| 2003–04 | 1 | 3rd of 8 | 13 | 1 | 7 | 70 | 39 | 40 | |
| 2004–05 | 1 | 3rd of 8 | 10 | 4 | 7 | 62 | 39 | 34 | |
| 2005–06 | 1 | 4th of 8 | 7 | 5 | 9 | 29 | 41 | 26 | |
| 2006–07 | 1 | 5th of 8 | 5 | 3 | 13 | 34 | 52 | 18 | |
| 2007–08 | 1 | 4th of 10 | | | | | | | |
| 2008–09 | 1 | 3rd of 10 | | | | | | | |
| 2009–10 | 1 | 3rd of 10 | | | | | | | |
| 2010–11 | 1 | 3rd of 10 | | | | | | | |
| 2011–12 | 1 | 3rd of 10 | | | | | | | |
| 2012–13 | 1 | 4th of 10 | | | | | | | |
| 2013–14 | 1 | 4th of 8 | 2 | 1 | 7 | 9 | 29 | 17 | |
| 2014–15 | 1 | 4th of 8 | 5 | 2 | 3 | 17 | 15 | 33 | |
| 2015–16 | 1 | 4th of 8 | 1 | 4 | 5 | 8 | 26 | 20 | |
| 2016–17 | 1 | 3rd of 8 | 4 | 1 | 5 | 13 | 19 | 17 | |
As VSK Aarhus
| 2017–18 | 1 | 4th of 8 | 4 | 1 | 5 | 12 | 13 | 15 | |
| 2018–19 | 1 | 3rd of 8 | 4 | 2 | 4 | 17 | 21 | 20 | |
| 2019–20 | 1 | 6th of 8 | 1 | 0 | 4 | 7 | 15 | 5 | |
AGF
| 2020–21 | 1 | 7th of 8 | 8 | 2 | 0 | 29 | 9 | 26 | |
| 2021–22 | 1 | 7th of 8 | 7 | 3 | 0 | 24 | 5 | 24 | |
| 2022–23 | 1 | 7th of 8 | 8 | 1 | 1 | 31 | 11 | 25 | |
| 2023–24 | 1 | 5th of 8 | 8 | 3 | 13 | 32 | 45 | 27 | |
| 2024–25 | 1 | 6th of 8 | 3 | 2 | 5 | 22 | 38 | 27 | |
| 2025–26 | 1 | 5th of 10 | 0 | 2 | 8 | 26 | 34 | 26 | |
| 2026–27 | 1 | Season in progress | | | | | | | |

Sources

- Danish Football Association (in Danish)
- Statistics - Tipsbladet
- De jyske fodboldklubbers historie [History of the Jutlandic football clubs] (PDF) (in Danish) (1st ed.). DBU. 1 April 2006. pp. 333–334.
- "Dansk fodbold: Kvindefodbold". Berlingske.dk (in Danish). 3 June 1999. Archived from the original on 8 January 2022.

== Honours ==
Incomplete

AGF Fodbold honours
| Honour | No. | Years |
|---|---|---|
| A-Liga | 10 | (gold) 1982, 1984, 1986, 1987, 1988, 1989, 1990, 1991, 1996–97, 1997–98 |
| A-Liga | 6 | (silver) 1983, 1992, 1994, 1995, 1996, 1998–99 |
| A-Liga | 13 | (bronze) 1985, 1993, 1999–00, 2000–01, 2001–02, 2003–04, 2004–05, 2008–09, 2009–10, 2010–11, 2011–12, 2016–17, 2018–19 |
| Danish Women's Cup | 3 | (gold) 1993, 1994, 2008–09 |
| Danish Women's Cup | 4 | (silver) 1997, 2003, 2006, 2010 |

== See also ==
- Aarhus Gymnastikforening, men's team
