= Danish Women's Cup =

Danish women's football tournament

Danish Cup
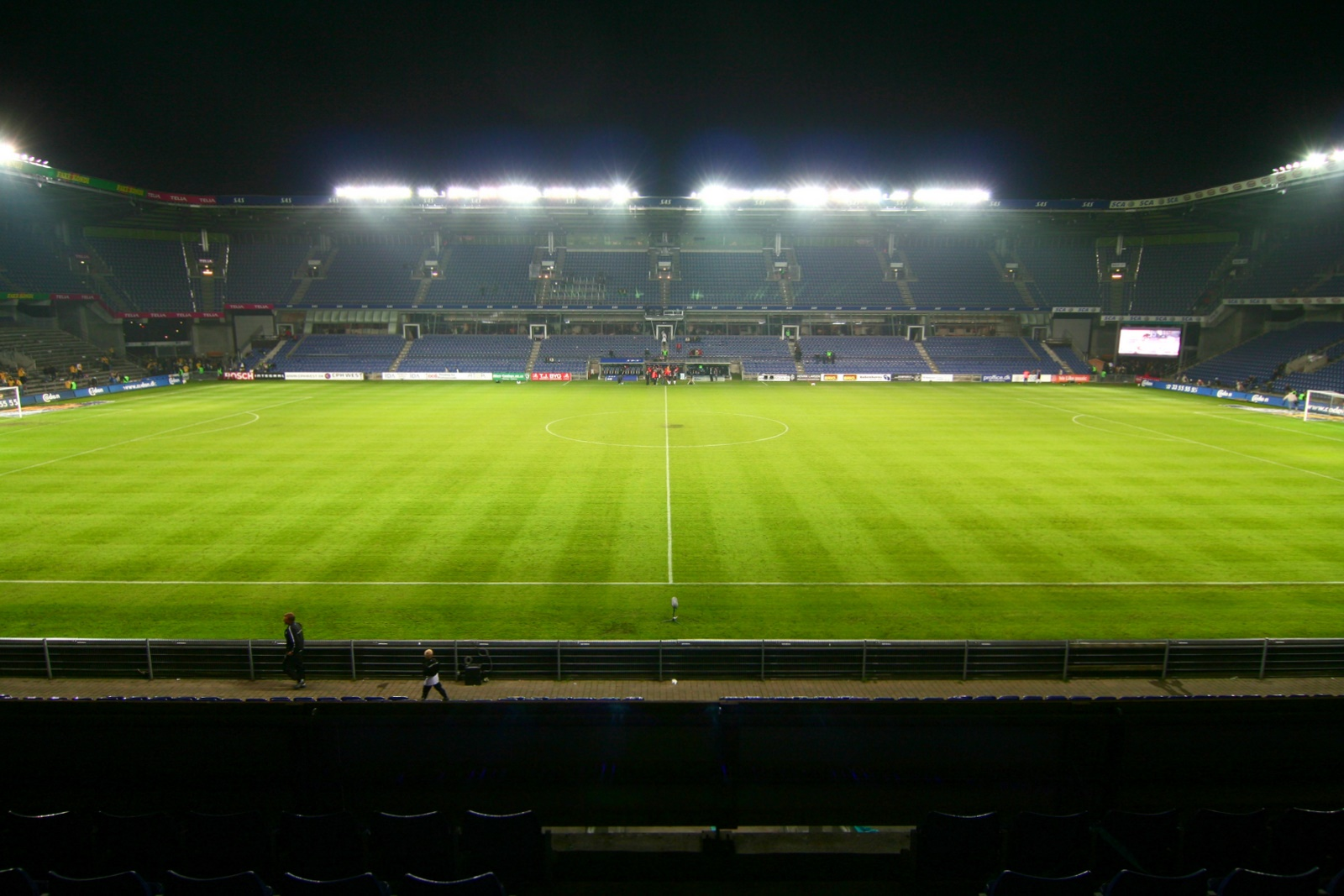
- Brøndby Stadium following a 2007 match against FC Midtjylland
- Organiser(s): Danish Football Association
- Founded: 1993; 33 years ago
- Region: Denmark
- Teams: 58 (2025–26)
- Current champions: HB Køge (1st title)
- Most championships: Brøndby IF; Fortuna Hjørring (11 titles)
- Broadcaster(s): Danish Broadcasting Corporation (DR) (semi-finals and final)
- 2026–27 Danish Women's Cup

The Danish Women's Cup (previously Sydbank Kvindepokalen, 3F Cup, and Gjenside Kvindepokalen for sponsorship reasons) is the Danish women's football cup competition. The inaugural cup was held in 1993.

Season	Winners
1993	Hjortshøj-Egå (HEI)
1994	Hjortshøj-Egå (HEI) (2)
1995	Fortuna Hjørring
1996	Fortuna Hjørring (2)
1996–97	Rødovre BK
1997–98	OB
1998–99	OB (2)
1999–00	Fortuna Hjørring (3)
2000–01	Fortuna Hjørring (4)
2001–02	Fortuna Hjørring (5)
2002–03	OB (3)
2003–04	Brøndby
2004–05	Brøndby (2)
2005–06	Fortuna Hjørring (6)
2006–07	Brøndby (3)
2007–08	Fortuna Hjørring (7)
2008–09	Skovbakken
2009–10	Brøndby (4)
2010–11	Brøndby (5)
2011–12	Brøndby (6)
2012–13	Brøndby (7)
2013–14	Brøndby (8)
2014–15	Brøndby (9)
2015–16	Fortuna Hjørring (8)
2016–17	Brøndby (10)
2017–18	Brøndby (11)
2018–19	Fortuna Hjørring (9)
2019–20	Nordsjælland
2020–21	FC Thy-Thisted Q
2021–22	Fortuna Hjørring (10)
2022–23	Nordsjælland (2)
2023–24	Nordsjælland (3)
2024–25	Fortuna Hjørring (11)
2025–26	HB Køge

== Format ==
The tournament consists of a total of six rounds.

The following 52 teams compete in the first round:

- 28 (13 teams from DBU Bornholm, DBU Lolland-Falster, DBU København and DBU Sjælland (East Denmark) and 15 teams from DBU Fyn and DBU Jylland (West Denmark)) that qualified in their local preliminary rounds;
- 12 teams that competed in the spring play-offs in the last season of C-Liga; (Note: Since reserve teams are not allowed to participate in the cup, any spots left open by reserve teams competing in the C-Liga are filled by extra teams from the preliminaries of the relevant area.)
- 6 teams that competed in the spring B-Liga qualification in the previous season of B-Liga;
- 6 teams that competed in the spring qualification in the last season of A-Liga;

The 26 winners of the first round are joined by the six teams that competed in the championship round in the last season of Women's League for a total of 32 teams in the second round.

Each active competitor plays a single match in each round, except for semifinals, where two legs are played (home and away). The opponents in the matches are determined by a draw. Up until and including the third round, pools based on geographical location are used for the draw to alleviate economic burden on the clubs. In case any of the matches ends in a draw, two rounds of 15 minute extra time are played and if the scores are still even the match is decided by a penalty shoot-out.

== List of finals ==
The list of finals:

Year	Winners	Result	Runners-up
1993	HEI (Hjortshøj Egå)	3–1	Vorup FB
1994	HEI (Hjortshøj Egå)	3–1	Rødovre BK
1995	Fortuna Hjørring	5–1	OB
1996	Fortuna Hjørring	3–1	Rødovre BK
1997	Rødovre BK	1–0	HEI (Hjortshøj Egå)
1998	OB	4–3	Fortuna Hjørring
1999	OB	2–1	FB (Frederiksberg)
2000	Fortuna Hjørring	6–2	FB (Frederiksberg)
2001	Fortuna Hjørring	3–2	Brøndby IF
2002	Fortuna Hjørring	4–1	Brøndby IF
2003	OB (Odense)	4–3 (Note: aet)	IK Skovbakken
2004	Brøndby IF	2–0	BSF
2005	Brøndby IF	3–0	Fortuna Hjørring
2006	Fortuna Hjørring	5–1	IK Skovbakken
2007	Brøndby IF	0–0^{[A]} (Note: 2–1 pens)	Fortuna Hjørring
2008	Fortuna Hjørring	4–0	SønderjyskE
2009	IK Skovbakken	1–1^{[B]} (Note: 4–3 pens)	Fortuna Hjørring
2010	Brøndby IF	2–0	IK Skovbakken
2011	Brøndby IF	3–2	Fortuna Hjørring
2012	Brøndby IF	4–0	Skjold
2013	Brøndby IF	3–2	Fortuna Hjørring
2014	Brøndby IF	3–1	OB
2015	Brøndby IF	2–1	Fortuna Hjørring
2016	Fortuna Hjørring	3–1	Brøndby IF
2017	Brøndby IF	3–1	Varde IF
2018	Brøndby IF	3–0	Kolding Q
2019	Fortuna Hjørring	1–0	Brøndby IF
2020	FC Nordsjælland	1–0	FC Thy-Thisted Q
2021	Thy-Thisted Q	2–1	Brøndby
2022	Fortuna Hjørring	3–1	Thy-Thisted Q
2023	Nordsjælland	2–0	Fortuna Hjørring
2024	Nordsjælland	2–1	Brøndby
2025	Fortuna Hjørring	1–0	Nordsjælland
2026	HB Køge	4–1	Nordsjælland

^{A} 0–0 after 90 minutes, no extra time played
^{B} 1–1 after 90 minutes, no extra time played

== By titles ==
As of the 2025–26 season

1st place, gold medalist(s)	2nd place, silver medalist(s)	Team
11	8	Fortuna Hjørring
11	5	Brøndby IF
3	4	HEI (Hjortshøj Egå) / Skovbakken
3	2	OB
3	0	FC Nordsjælland
1	2	Rødovre BK
1	1	FC Thy-Thisted Q
1	0	HB Køge
0	2	FB (Frederiksberg)
0	1	Kolding Q
0	1	BK Skjold
0	1	BSF
0	1	SønderjyskE
0	1	Vorup FB
0	1	Varde IF

== Awards ==
The Danish Cup has awarded the player of the tournament award (Danish: Årets pokalfighter) since 1998.

Year	Player	Club
1998	Birgit Christensen	Fortuna Hjørring
1999	Donny Bake	FB
2000	Birgit Christensen	Fortuna Hjørring
2001	Janne Madsen	Fortuna Hjørring
2002	Christina Bonde	Fortuna Hjørring
2003	Rikke Nørgaard	IK Skovbakken
2004	Signe Højen Andersen	Skovlunde
2005	Cathrine Paaske	Brøndby IF
2006	Chi-Chi Igbo	Fortuna Hjørring
2007	Janne Madsen	Fortuna Hjørring
2008	Mariann Gajhede Knudsen	Fortuna Hjørring
2009	Mia Kjærsgaard Andersen	IK Skovbakken
2010	Sanne Troelsgaard	Brøndby IF
2011	Chi-Chi Igbo	Fortuna Hjørring
2012	Nanna Christiansen	Brøndby IF
2013	Nadia Nadim	Fortuna Hjørring
2014	Louise Larsen	OB
2015	Simone Boye	Brøndby IF
2016	Nevena Damjanović	Fortuna Hjørring
2017	Solveig Enemark Andersen	Varde IF
2018	Ria Öling	Brøndby IF
2019	Rikke Sevecke	Brøndby IF
2020	Kathrine Møller Kühl	FC Nordsjælland
2021	Maja Bay Østergaard	Thy-Thisted Q
2022	Vibeke Andersen	Thy-Thisted Q
2023	Emilie Byrna	FC Nordsjælland
2024	Winonah Heatley	FC Nordsjælland
2025	Winonah Heatley	FC Nordsjælland
2026	Macy Schultz	HB Køge

== See also ==
- A-Liga
- B-Liga
- C-Liga
- Danish Women's Football League
- Danish Cup, men's edition
