= Brøndby IF (women) =

Danish women's association football team

- Full name: Brøndbyernes Idrætsforening
- Short name: Brøndby
- Founded: 1971; 55 years ago
- Ground: 1964 Park
- Capacity: 2,000
- Chairman: Jan Bech Andersen
- Coach: Bengt Sæternes
- League: A-Liga
- 2025–26: A-Liga, 2nd of 8
- Website: Brøndby IF
Home colours	Away colours

Brøndby IF is a Danish professional women's football team based in Brøndby, Denmark. Brøndby compete in A-Liga, the Danish top-flight division and play their matches at the 1964 Park stadium.

The team is one of Denmark's best women's teams, having won six championships and 5 cups in the 2000s. The team also reached the semi-finals of the UEFA Women's Cup 2003–04, UEFA Women's Cup 2006-07 and UEFA Women's Cup 2014-15, but they have struggled to reach European football in the later years, as the competition nationally and internationally has improved. They are currently coached by Bengt Sæternes, who replaced Per Nielsen after many years at the club.

On 30 April 2024, Brøndby announced that the women's team was to move from the amateur side of the club to the professional side in the coming summer. On 11 November 2024 the club announced that it would introduce full-time football for the women's team, being the first club in Denmark to make the move to full-time football for all first team players. The moves comes as part of a long term strategy to strengthen women's football and create an environment of optimum development. It also comes as a reaction to the general developing state of women's football throughout Europe and the world.

== History ==
The team's first ever independent kit was launched in 2025 for the 2025–26 A-Liga season. It is designed by Hummel and the home kit, launched in August, features the golden Brøndby colour in two-toned horizontal blocks separated by a blue line. The away kit was released in September and is black with diagonal dark grey bolts, pink paint spills on the chest framed by pink sleeve lines.

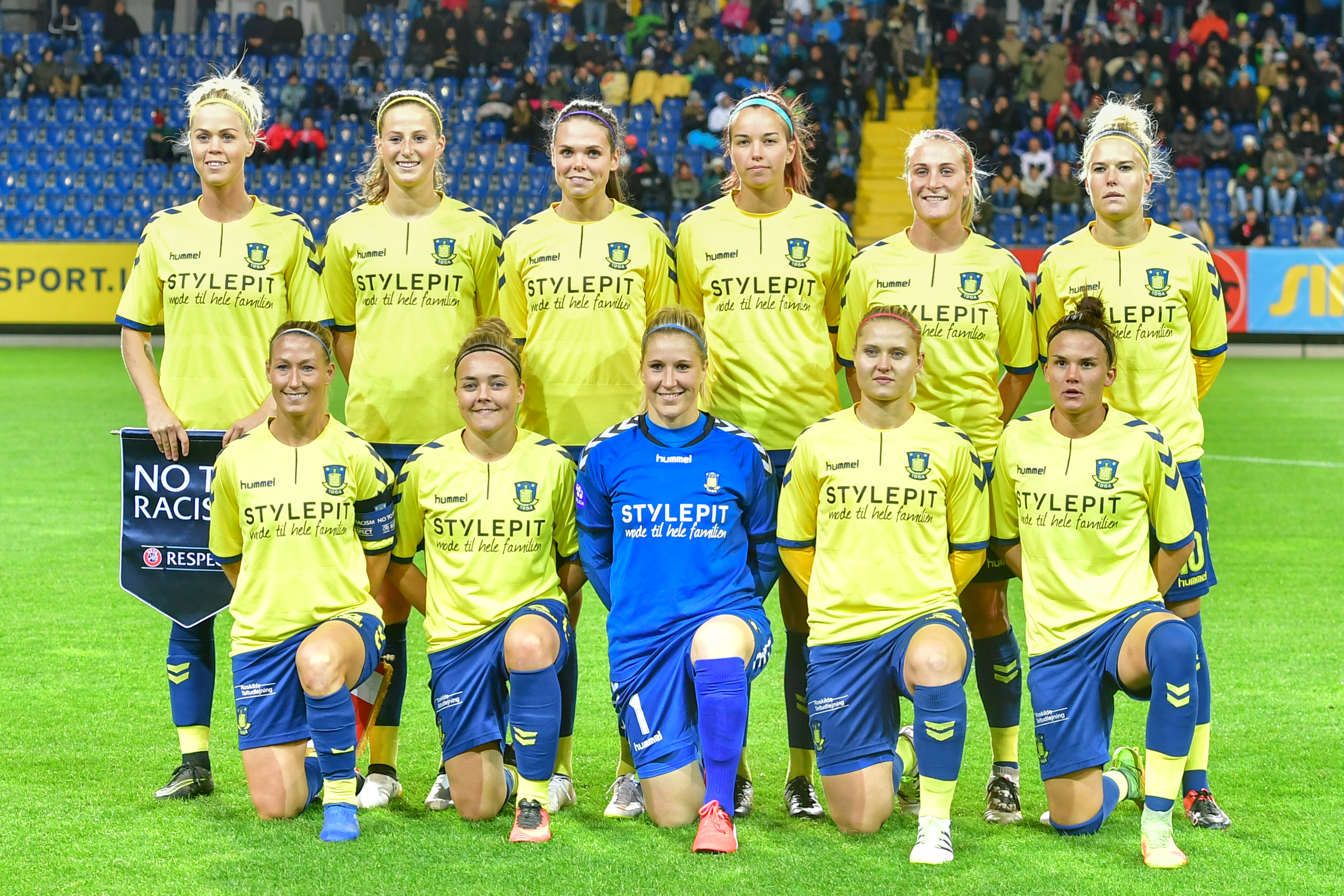
Brøndby IF lineup vs SKN St. Pölten in the 2016 Champions League.

== Players ==
=== Current team ===
As of 28 August 2026

Note: Flags indicate national team as defined under FIFA eligibility rules; some limited exceptions apply. Players may hold more than one non-FIFA nationality.

No.	Pos.	Nation	Player
3	DF	USA	Michaela Kovacs
4	DF	DEN	Julie Madsen (vice-captain)
6	MF	SCO	Amy Rodgers
7	MF	DEN	Mathilde Carstens
8	MF	DEN	Mathilde Rasmussen
10	FW	SWE	Tilde Lindwall
11	MF	DEN	Cecilie Buchberg
12	MF	DEN	Kamilla Karlsen (captain)
13	MF	POL	Martyna Brodzik
14	MF	ISL	Hafrún Rakel Halldórsdóttir
15	MF	DEN	Elvira Nejmann
16	MF	SWE	Hanna Andersson
17	FW	DEN	Amalie Thestrup

No.	Pos.	Nation	Player
18	DF	NOR	Malin Brenn (3rd captain)
19	FW	NOR	Rakel Engesvik
20	FW	SUI	Chiara Messerli
21	GK	UGA	Vanessa Karungi
22	MF	DEN	Kaya Mortensen
23	DF	DEN	Emilie Fink
25	DF	DEN	Evelina Thygesen
26	MF	USA	Emma Pelkowski
32	GK	USA	Jalen Tompkins
33	FW	FIN	Lilli Halttunen
37	MF	DEN	Mila Bischoff
40	GK	DEN	Isabella Andersen

==== Out on loan ====
Note: Flags indicate national team as defined under FIFA eligibility rules; some limited exceptions apply. Players may hold more than one non-FIFA nationality.

No.	Pos.	Nation	Player
19	FW	NOR	Julie Klæboe (at Lillestrøm until 31 December 2026)

=== Player records ===
==== Caps ====
As of 13 June 2026

#	Player	Caps
1	Nanna Christiansen	520
2	Mia Brogaard	358
3	Julie Tavlo Petersson	329
4	Theresa Eslund	314
5	Anna Jørgensen	224
6	Tine Cederkvist	216

==== Goals ====
As of 13 June 2026

#	Player	Goals
1	Nanna Christiansen	270
2	Anna Jørgensen	195

=== Captains ===
Incomplete

Captaincy	Player
2026–	Kamilla Karlsen
2024–2025	Julie Tavlo Petersson
2021–2024	Nanna Christiansen
2020–2021	Theresa Eslund
2017–	Louise Lundsgaard
2017	Simone Boye
2014–2016	Theresa Eslund
–2014	Malene Marquard

=== Former players ===
For details of former players, see Category:Brøndby IF (women) players.

== Management ==
=== Coaching ===
As of 27 August 2025

Role	Name
Head Coach	(Norway) Bengt Sæternes
Assistant Coach	(Denmark) Theresa Eslund
Goalkeeping Coach	(Denmark) Kacper Polak
Fitness Coach	(Denmark) Andreas Kure
Mental Coach	(Denmark) Anton Vergod
Sports Psychologist	(Denmark) Julie Tavlo Petersson
Team Manager	(Denmark) Peder Mannerup (Denmark) Mathias Eslund
Development Coach	(Denmark) Mie Leth Karshøj

=== Club ===
Role	Name
Head of Football	(Norway) Kim André Pedersen
Head of Recruitment	(Denmark) Kenneth Kretschmer
Head of Development	(Denmark) Theresa Eslund

=== Managers ===
Incomplete

Years	Name
2024–	(Norway) Bengt Sæternes
2015–2024	(Denmark) Per Nielsen
2010–2014	(Denmark) Peer Lisdorf
2006–2008	(Denmark) Henrik Jensen
2005	(Denmark) Kenneth Heiner-Møller
2003–2004	(Denmark) Peer Danefeld
2002–2003	(Denmark) Peder Siggard

== Honours ==
Incomplete

Title	No.	Year(s)
A-Liga	12	(gold) 2002–03, 2003–04, 2004–05, 2005–06, 2006–07, 2007–08, 2010–11, 2011–12, 2012–13, 2014–15, 2016–17, 2018–19
A-Liga	11	(silver) 2001–02, 2008–09, 2009–10, 2013–14, 2015–16, 2017–18, 2019–20, 2020–21, 2022–23, 2023–24, 2025–26
A-Liga	1	(bronze) 2021–22
Danish Cup	11	(gold) 2003–04, 2004–05, 2006–07, 2009–10, 2010–11, 2011–12, 2012–13, 2013–14, 2014–15, 2016–17, 2017–18
INVITATIONAL
Turbine Hallencup	1	(gold) 2013

Sources

- "Pokalvindere af Kvindepokalen | Dansk Boldspil Union – DBU". DBU (in Danish).
- "Danmarksmestre, A-liga | Dansk Boldspil Union – DBU". DBU (in Danish).

== Seasons ==
As of the 2025–26 season

Key
(gold) Champions	Promotion
(silver) Silver	Relegation
(bronze) Bronze	Did not qualify

Incomplete

Season	Tier	#	W	D	L	F	A	Pts.	DC	UCL	EC
DIVISION WEST (2nd of 2) (Note: The league was originally divided into two groups of 10 teams, representing the east and the west of the country.)									—N/a	—N/a	—N/a
1975									—N/a	—N/a	—N/a
1976									—N/a	—N/a	—N/a
1977									—N/a	—N/a	—N/a
1978									—N/a	—N/a	—N/a
1979									—N/a	—N/a	—N/a
1980									—N/a	—N/a	—N/a
SINGLE-DIVISION LEAGUE (Note: From the 1981 season onwards, the league was changed to a single division encompassing the 12 best teams from across the country.)									—N/a	—N/a	—N/a
1981									—N/a	—N/a	—N/a
1982									—N/a	—N/a	—N/a
1983									—N/a	—N/a	—N/a
1984									—N/a	—N/a	—N/a
1985									—N/a	—N/a	—N/a
1986									—N/a	—N/a	—N/a
1987									—N/a	—N/a	—N/a
1988									—N/a	—N/a	—N/a
1989									—N/a	—N/a	—N/a
1990									—N/a	—N/a	—N/a
1991									—N/a	—N/a	—N/a
1992									—N/a	—N/a	—N/a
1993										—N/a	—N/a
1994										—N/a	—N/a
1995	2									—N/a	—N/a
1996	1									—N/a	—N/a
1996–97	1	5th of 8	10	2	16	65	85	32		—N/a	—N/a
1997–98	1	6th of 8	6	3	19	37	100	21		—N/a	—N/a
1998–99	1	7th of 8 (Note: Brøndby lost the relegation play-off match to Vorup, who placed second in the then-Danish Women's 2nd Division.)	6	3	19	30	85	21		—N/a	—N/a
1999–00	2									—N/a	—N/a
2000–01	1	4th of 8	12	7	9	67	52	43		—N/a	—N/a
2001–02	1	2nd of 8	20	5	3	95	25	65			—N/a
2002–03	1	1st of 8	17	3	1	73	15	54			—N/a
2003–04	1	1st of 8	18	2	1	63	12	56	1st	SF	—N/a
2004–05	1	1st of 8	20	0	1	83	9	60	1st		—N/a
2005–06	1	1st of 8	19	1	1	81	8	58	QF	QF	—N/a
2006–07	1	1st of 8	19	0	2	97	9	57	1st	SF	—N/a
2007–08	1	1st of 10	5	1	0	22	0	42	QF	QF	—N/a
2008–09	1	2nd of 10	4	0	2	13	7	36	QF	QF	—N/a
2009–10	1	2nd of 10	4	0	2	10	6	36	1st	R16	—N/a
2010–11	1	1st of 10	5	0	1	17	6	40	1st	R16	—N/a
2011–12	1	1st of 10	3	2	1	8	6	37	1st	QF	—N/a
2012–13	1	1st of 10	5	1	0	29	3	43	1st	R32	—N/a
2013–14	1	2nd of 8	9	0	1	27	7	43	1st	R32	—N/a
2014–15	1	1st of 8	8	0	2	33	11	50	1st	SF	—N/a
2015–16	1	2nd of 8	7	2	1	23	9	40	2nd	R32	—N/a
2016–17	1	1st of 8	8	2	0	36	5	36	1st	R16	—N/a
2017–18	1	2nd of 8	7	0	3	25	12	29	1st	R32	—N/a
2018–19	1	1st of 8	13	1	0	64	5	40	2nd	R16	—N/a
2019–20	1	2nd of 8	4	1	0	8	2	21	QF	R16	—N/a
2020–21	1	2nd of 8	7	1	2	26	9	30	2nd	R16	—N/a
2021–22	1	3rd of 8	1	3	6	40	43	31	QF	—N/a	—N/a
2022–23	1	2nd of 8	8	1	1	48	27	57	QF	—N/a	—N/a
2023–24	1	2nd of 8	14	4	6	40	24	46	2nd	—N/a	—N/a
2024–25	1	4th of 8	2	5	3	32	21	38	SF	—N/a	—N/a
2025–26	1	2nd of 8	8	2	0	39	16	50	SF	—N/a	—N/a
2026–27	1	Season in progress								—N/a	

Sources: Danish Football Association (in Danish), RSSSF - The Rec.Sport.Soccer Statistics Foundation, Tipsbladet (in Danish)

== European ==
Results list Brøndby's goal tally first.

=== Champions League (2001–) ===
==== Competition ====
Season	Stage	Opponent	Result
UEFA Cup (2001–2009)
2003–04	QF	(Azerbaijan) Gömrükçü Baku	9–0; 3–0
2003–04	SF	(Sweden) Umeå	2–3; 0–1
2005–06	QF	(France) Montpellier	0–3; 1–3
2006–07	QF	(Germany) Turbine Potsdam	3–0; 1–2
2006–07	SF	(England) Arsenal	2–2; 0–3
2007–08	QF	(Italy) Bardolino	1–0; 0–1^{P}
2008–09	QF	(Russia) Zvezda Perm	2–4; 1–3
Champions League (2009–)
2009–10	R32	(Netherlands) AZ Alkmaar	2–1; 1–1
2009–10	R16	(Germany) Turbine Potsdam	0–1; 0–4
2010–11	R32	(Poland) Unia Racibórz	2–1; 0–1
2010–11	R16	(England) Everton	1–4; 1–1
2011–12	R32	(Belgium) Standard Liège	2–0; 3–4
2011–12	R16	(Italy) Torres	2–1; 3–1
2011–12	QF	(France) Olympique Lyon	4–0; 0–4
2012–13	R32	(Norway) Stabæk	2–0; 3–3
2013–14	R32	(Spain) Barcelona	0–0; 2–2
2014–15	R32	(Cyprus) Apollon Limassol	0–1; 3–1^{(a.e.t.)}
2014–15	R16	(Lithuania) Gintra Universitetas	5–0; 0–2
2014–15	QF	(Sweden) Linköpings FC	1–0; 1–1
2014–15	SF	(Germany) 1. FFC Frankfurt	0–7; 0–6
2015–16	R32	(Czech Republic) Slavia Praha	1–4; 1–0
2016-17	R32	(Austria) St. Pölten-Spratzern	0–2; 2–2
2016-17	R16	(England) Manchester City	1–0; 1–1
2017-18	R32	(Norway) Lillestrøm LSK	0–0; 3–1
2018-19	R32	(Italy) Juventus	2–2; 1–0
2018-19	R16	(Norway) Lillestrøm LSK	1–1; 0–2
2020–21	R32	(Norway) Vålerenga	Canc. 1–1^{P}
2020–21	R16	(France) Lyon	0–2; 1–3

==== Qualification ====
Season	Stage	Opponent	Result
UEFA Cup (2001–2009)
2003–04	2nd QR	(Scotland) Kilmarnock FC	2–0
2003–04	2nd QR	(Iceland) KR Reykjavík	1–0
2003–04	2nd QR	(Serbia and Montenegro) Mašinac Niš	4–0
2004–05	2nd QR	(Russia) Energiya Voronezh	1–1
2004–05	2nd QR	(Kazakhstan) Alma-KTZ	2–0
2004–05	2nd QR	(Norway) Trondheims-Ørn	0–2
2005–06	2nd QR	(Russia) Lada Togliatti	2–0
2005–06	2nd QR	(Poland) AZS Wrocław	3–1
2005–06	2nd QR	(England) Arsenal	4–0
2006–07	2nd QR	(Hungary) Femina Budapest	5–1
2006–07	2nd QR	(Russia) Rossiyanka	2–1
2006–07	2nd QR	(England) Arsenal	0–1
2007–08	2nd QR	(France) Olympique Lyon	1–1
2007–08	2nd QR	(Czech Republic) Sparta Prague	2–1
2007–08	2nd QR	(Norway) Kolbotn	1–0
2008–09	2nd QR	(Spain) Levante	1–0
2008–09	2nd QR	(Ukraine) Naftokhimik Kalush	5–1
2008–09	2nd QR	(Germany) Duisburg	1–4
Champions League (2009–)
2009–10	QR	(Wales) Cardiff City	5–0
2009–10	QR	(Malta) Birkirkara	6–0
2009–10	QR	(Portugal) 1º de Dezembro	1–0
2010–11	QR	(Moldova) Roma Calfa	6–0
2010–11	QR	(Turkey) Gazi Üniversitesispor	12–0
2010–11	QR	(Bulgaria) NSA Sofia	3–0
2021–22	QR	(Sweden) Kristianstad	0–1
2021–22	QR	(Czech Republic) Slovácko	2–1
2023–24	QR	(Scotland) Celtic	0–1
2023–24	QR	(Belarus) FC Minsk	2–1
2024–25	QR	(Italy) Fiorentina	0–1
2024–25	QR	(Ukraine) Kolos Kovalivka	2–1
2026–27	QR	(Netherlands) Ajax	0–2
2026–27	QR	(Czech Republic) Slavia Praha	1–1^{P}

=== Europa Cup (2025–) ===
==== Competition ====
Season	Stage	Opponent	Result
2026–27	R16	(Norway) Rosenborg	1–1; 2–0
2026–27	QF	(Germany) Wolfsburg	

==== Qualification ====
Season	Stage	Opponent	Result
2026–27	QR1	(Serbia) Spartak Subotica	5–0; 4–1
2026–27	QR2	(Portugal) Sporting CP	4–1; 2–2

== Awards ==
=== Player of the Year ===
Year	Player	Ref.
2025	Julie Madsen	
2024	Julie Tavlo	
2023	Julie Tavlo	
2022	Julie Tavlo	
2021	Nanna Christiansen	
2020	Nanna Christiansen	
2019	Nicoline Sørensen	
2018	Nanna Christiansen	

== See also ==
- Brøndby IF (men's team)
