= Petersen =

- Pronunciation: PeH-teHr-seHn

Origin
- Origin: Nordic
- Meaning: "son of Peter"
- Region of origin: Scandinavia: Denmark, Norway, Sweden; Northern Germany: Former old Danish territories.

Other names
- Related names: Peterson; Pettersen; Pedersen

Petersen is a common Danish patronymic surname, meaning "son of Peter". Petersén is a Swedish orthographic variant.

Notable people with the name include:

== A ==
- Alex Petersen (1924–2014), American football coach
- Alexandros Petersen (1984–2014), American academic
- Alfonso Petersen (born 1961), Mexican physician and politician
- Alfred C. N. Petersen (1868–1933), American physician and football coach
- Alicia O'Shea Petersen (1862–1923), Tasmanian suffragist and social reformer
- Alviro Petersen (born 1980), South African cricketer
- Anders Petersen (boxer) (1899–1966), Danish boxer
- Anders Petersen (historian) (1827–1914), Danish historian
- Anders Petersen (photographer) (born 1944), Swedish photographer
- Anders Petersen (sport shooter) (1876–1968), Danish sport shooter
- Andrew Petersen (1870–1953), American politician
- Anja Petersen (born 2000), German operatic soprano
- Anker Eli Petersen (born 1959), Faroese writer and artist
- Ann Petersen (1927–2003), Belgian actress
- Anna Petersen (1845–1910), Danish painter
- Annar Petersen (1931–2020), Norwegian ice hockey player
- Anne C. Petersen (born 1944), American psychologist
- Anne Helen Petersen, American writer and journalist
- Annika Fríðheim Petersen (born 1999), Faroese handball player
- Arne Petersen (1913–1990), Danish cyclist
- Arnold Petersen (1885–1976), American socialist
- Arona Petersen, artist, businesswoman and chef
- Austin Petersen (born 1981), American writer, political activist, and producer
- Axel Petersen (athlete) (1880–1962), Danish athlete
- Axel Petersen (footballer) (1887–1968), Danish footballer

== B ==
- Barbara A. Petersen, American politician
- Barry Petersen (born 1949), American journalist
- Bent Blach Petersen (1924–1984), Danish rower
- Bernt Petersen (1937–2017), Danish furniture designer
- Bjarne Petersen (born 1952), Danish footballer
- Bjarni K. Petersen (born 1994), Faroese politician
- Bo Petersen (born 1958), Danish speedway rider
- Bobbi Petersen, American volleyball coach
- Boyd Petersen (born 1962), American academic
- Branden Petersen (born 1986), American politician
- Brandon Petersen (born 1994), South African soccer player
- Brett Petersen (born 1976), South African swimmer
- Bryan Petersen (born 1986), American baseball player
- Bryan Petersen (basketball) (born 1987), American basketball coach

== C ==
- C.G. Johannes Petersen (1860–1928), Danish marine biologist
- Cal Petersen (born 1994), American ice hockey player
- Calvin Petersen (born 1961), South African soccer player
- Carl Petersen (Danish politician) (1894–1984), Danish politician
- Carl Petersen (neuroscientist), Denmark-born Swiss neuroscientist
- Carl Petersen (runner) (1902–1983), Danish long-distance runner
- Carl Emil Petersen (1875–1971), US Navy Medal of Honor recipient
- Carl Friedrich Petersen (1809–1892), German lawyer and politician
- Carl Wilhelm Petersen (1868–1933), German lawyer and politician
- Casper Petersen (1826–1906), 19th century American politician
- Chap Petersen (born 1968), American politician from Virginia
- Charles-Henri Petersen (1792–1859), German/Dutch architect
- Chris Petersen (born 1964), American football player and coach
- Chris Petersen (baseball) (born 1970), American baseball player
- Christian Petersen (ice hockey) (1937–2009), Norwegian ice hockey player
- Christian Petersen (politician) (1801–1875), Norwegian politician
- Christian Petersen (sculptor) (1885–1961), American sculptor
- Christian G. Petersen (born 1978), Norwegian footballer
- Christian T. Petersen (born 2000), American game designer
- Christina Petersen (born 1974), Danish footballer
- Clemens Petersen (1834–1918), Danish esthetician and critic
- Clyde Petersen (born 1980), American film director, animator, and musician
- Colin Petersen (1946–2024), Australian musician
- Courtney Petersen (born 1997), American soccer player
- Cynthia Petersen, Canadian lawyer and judge

== D ==
- Dan Petersen (born 1972), Danish footballer
- Daniel F. Petersen (born 1951), American politician
- Daniel Frederik Petersen (1757–1816), Norwegian general
- Danny J. Petersen (1949–1970), Vietnam War Medal of Honor recipient
- Dave Petersen (born 1992), English rugby league footballer
- David Petersen (actor) (1947–2018), Canadian actor
- David Petersen (Arizona politician) (born 1950), American politician
- David Petersen (comics) (born 1977), American comic book creator
- David Petersen (composer) (1651–1737), Dutch composer
- David Petersen (sculptor) (born 1944), Welsh sculptor
- David L. Petersen (born 1943), American theologian
- Desiree Petersen (born 1953), Canadian professional wrestler
- Devon Petersen (born 1986), South African darts player
- Don Petersen (playwright) (1927–1998), American dramatist
- Donald Petersen (1926–2024), American businessman
- Donny Petersen (1947–2021), American outlaw biker
- Doug Petersen (Canadian football) (born 1969), Canadian football player
- Douglas W. Petersen (1948–2014), American politician

== E ==
- Edgar Petersen (1904-1986), WW2 Luftwaffe officer & pilot
- Edith Brenneche Petersen (1896–1973), Danish Lutheran priest
- Edvard Petersen (1841–1911), Danish painter
- Eileen Ward Petersen (born 1937), Danish swimmer
- Elisa Petersen (1876–1932), Danish politician and women's rights activist
- Ellen Dorrit Petersen (born 1975), Norwegian actress
- Elmer Petersen (1928–2020), American sculptor
- Else Petersen (1910–2002), Danish actress
- Emil Petersen, Danish motorcycle racer
- Emilie Petersen (1782–1859), Swedish philanthropist
- Eric Petersen, American actor
- Erich Petersen (1889–1963), German general (1889–1963)
- Erik Petersen (rower) (1939–2025), Danish rower
- Erling Petersen (1906–1992), Norwegian economist and politician
- Ernst Petersen (1906–1959), German architect and actor
- Ethel Ward Petersen (born 1942), Danish swimmer
- Eugen Petersen (1836–1919), German classical archaeologist and philologist
- Eva Bendix Petersen, Australian academic
- Ewa Hedkvist Petersen (born 1952), Swedish politician

== F ==
- Forrest S. Petersen (1922–1990), American Naval Rear Admiral
- Frank E. Petersen (1932–2015), United States Marine Corps general
- Frank S. Petersen (1922–2011), American politician
- Fred Petersen (rugby league) (born 1978), Samoa international rugby league footballer
- Fred A. Petersen (1808–1885), American architect
- Fred C. Petersen (born 1908), American politician
- Frederick Petersen (1874–1946), American politician
- Frederik Petersen (1759–1825), Norwegian painter
- Fredrik Petersen (born 1983), Swedish handball player
- Fríðrikur Petersen (1853–1917), Faroese politician and bishop
- Friis Arne Petersen (born 1952), Danish diplomat

== G ==
- Gavin Petersen, American college basketball coach
- Georg Petersen (1820–1900), Danish businessman
- George Petersen (biochemist) (1933–2021), New Zealand biochemist
- George Petersen (historian) (1900–1978), New Zealand lawyer, politician and historian
- George Petersen (politician) (1921–2000), Australian politician
- Gert Petersen (1927–2009), Danish socialist politician and journalist
- Graeme Petersen (born 1941), New Zealand footballer
- Grant Petersen (born 1954), American businessman
- Greg Petersen, American soccer player and coach

== H ==
- Hanns Petersen (1927–2006), German teacher, opera and pop singer
- Hans Christian Petersen (1793–1862), Norwegian politician
- Hans von Petersen (1850–1914), German painter
- Hans W. Petersen (1897–1974), Danish actor
- Harald Petersen (1893–1970), Danish politician
- Heidi M. Petersen (born 1958), Norwegian businessperson
- Helgi Petersen (born 1978), Faroese footballer
- Henning Petersen (born 1939), Danish cyclist
- Henning Eiler Petersen (1877–1946), Danish mycologist, botanist and marine biologist
- Henry Petersen (1900–1949), Danish pole vaulter
- Henry E. Petersen (1921–1991), American lawyer
- Herman Petersen (1713–1765), Swedish merchant
- Hjalmar Petersen (1890–1968), American politician
- Holger Petersen (Canadian businessman) (born 1949), Canadian record producer
- Holger Petersen (Danish businessman) (1843-1917), Danish merchant
- Howard C. Petersen (1910–1995), American lawyer

== I ==
- Ian R. Petersen (born 1956), Australian control theorist
- Ike Petersen (1909–1995), American football player

== J ==
- Jack Petersen (boxer) (1911–1990), Welsh boxer
- Jack Petersen (guitarist) (born 1933), American jazz guitarist and educator
- Jacob Christian Petersen (1870–1964), Norwegian theologian
- Jacob de Petersen (1622–1704), Danish and Brunswijker courtier
- James Petersen (anthropologist) (1954–2005), American anthropologist and archaeologist
- Jan Petersen (cyclist) (born 1970), Danish cyclist
- Jan Petersen (historian) (1887–1967), Norwegian archaeologist
- Jan Petersen (medallist) (born 1945), Danish medallist, draftsman and graphic artist
- Jan Petersen (politician) (born 1946), Norwegian politician
- Jan Petersen (writer) (1906–1969), German writer
- Janet Petersen (born 1970), American politician
- Janice Petersen (born 1977), Australian television presenter
- Jann Ingi Petersen (born 1984), Faroese footballer
- Jasmine Petersen (born 2002), South African politician
- Javiera Petersen (born 1990), Chilean economist
- Jens Petersen (1941–2012), Danish footballer
- Jesper Petersen (handballer) (born 1953), Danish handball player
- Jesper Petersen (politician) (born 1981), Danish politician
- Jim Petersen (born 1962), American basketball player
- Johan Carl Christian Petersen (1813–1880), Danish seaman and interpreter
- Johann Wilhelm Petersen (1649–1727), German theologian
- Johanna Eleonora Petersen (1644–1724), German author
- Johanne Christine Petersen (1847–1922), Danish school principal
- Johannes Petersen, Danish chess player
- Johannes Boye Petersen (1887–1961), Danish botanist and phycologist
- John Petersen (footballer) (born 1972), Faroese footballer and manager
- John Petersen (musician) (1942–2007), American drummer
- John C. Petersen (1842–1887), American politician
- John D. Petersen (1947–2025), American chemist, educator and academic administrator
- Johnny Petersen (born 1947), Danish football manager and former player
- Johnny Algreen Petersen (born 1948), Danish rower
- Jonathan Petersen (1881–1961), Greenlandic songwriter, composer of the national anthem
- Jørgen Bo Petersen (born 1970), Danish cyclist
- Jørgen Fryd Petersen (1925–1988), Danish weightlifter
- Josef Petersen (1881–1973), Danish writer
- Joy Selig Petersen (fl. 1988–1991), American gymnast
- Julius Petersen (1839–1910), Danish mathematician
- Julius Petersen (literary scholar) (1878–1941), German philologist, Germanist and literary historian
- Justin Tanner Petersen (1960–2010), American hacker and informant

== K ==
- Katelin Petersen (born 1989), American actress, writer, and producer
- Käthe Petersen (1903–1981), German jurist and lawyer
- Katia Forbert Petersen (born 1949), Polish-Danish filmmaker
- Keegan Petersen (born 1993), South African cricketer
- Ken Petersen (born 1939), American football player
- Kenneth Emil Petersen (born 1985), Danish footballer
- Kenneth Fredslund Petersen (born 1965), Danish politician
- Kevin David Petersen (born 1964), American politician
- Kevin L. Petersen (born 1951), American aerospace engineer
- Kim E. Petersen
- Kjeld Petersen (1920–1962), Danish actor
- Klaus Petersen (born 1951), Danish modern pentathlete
- Klaus-Dieter Petersen (born 1968), German handball player
- Knud Petersen (born 1934), Danish footballer
- Knud Arne Petersen (1862–1943), Danish architect
- Kristian Friis Petersen (1867–1932), Norwegian politician
- Kurt Petersen (American football) (born 1957), American football player
- Kurt Petersen (inventor) (born 1948), American businessman
- Kurt W. Petersen (born 1934), Danish speedway rider
- Kye Petersen (born 1990), Canadian skier

== L ==
- Lars Petersen (born 1965), Danish dressage rider
- Leif Sylvester Petersen (born 1940), Danish artist, musician and actor
- Leiva Petersen (1912–1992), German classical philologist and publisher
- Lene Adler Petersen (born 1944), Danish artist
- Linda Petersen (born 2012), Brazilian rhythmic gymnast
- Lionel Petersen (1947–2022), South African singer
- Lisbeth L. Petersen (1939–2024), Faroese politician
- Lise Petersen (born 2005), German Paralympic athlete
- Lone Kroman Petersen (born 1950), Danish equestrian
- Lou Petersen (1897–1961), New Zealand international rugby footballer
- Louise Petersen (1894–1983), Danish diver
- Loy Petersen (born 1945), American basketball player
- Ludvig Petersen (1848–1935), Danish architect
- Luvia Petersen, Canadian actress
- Lyndell Petersen (1931–2025), American politician

== M ==
- Malia Ann Kawailanamalie Petersen, Hula dancer
- Malin Petersen (born 1981), Swedish equestrian
- Marga Petersen (1919–2002), German athlete
- Mariane Petersen (1937–2025), Greenlandic poet, translator, museum curator, and politician
- Marie Petersen (1816–1859), German author
- Marie Bjelke Petersen (1874–1969), Danish-Australian novelist
- Marita Petersen (1940–2001), Prime Minister of the Faroe Islands 1993–1994
- Mark E. Petersen (1900–1984), American religious leader
- Marlis Petersen (born 1968), German operatic coloratura soprano
- Martin Petersen (born 1985), German football referee
- Matilda Petersen (born 1991), Swedish badminton player
- Matthew Petersen (born 1980), US international rugby league footballer
- Matthew S. Petersen (born 1970), American attorney
- Matthias Petersen (1632–1706), German Ostfrysk whaler
- Michael Petersen (baseball) (born 1994), American baseball player
- Michael Bang Petersen (born 1980), Danish political scientist
- Mike Petersen (basketball) (born 1958), American basketball coach
- Mike Petersen (Kansas politician) (born 1960), American politician
- Mike Petersen (soccer) (born 1965), Australian soccer player
- Mike Petersen (Utah politician) (born 1963), American politician
- Mons Andreas Petersen (1829–1886), Norwegian farmer
- Morten Petersen (born 1978), Danish footballer
- Morten Helveg Petersen (born 1966), Danish politician

== N ==
- Naalli Petersen (1919–1997), Danish sailor
- Naimángitsoᴋ' Petersen (1957–2013), Greenlandic politician
- Neal Petersen (born 1967), South African yacht racer
- Nick Petersen (born 1989), Canadian ice hockey player
- Niels Petersen (gymnast) (1885–1961), Danish gymnast
- Niels Petersen (sport shooter) (born 1932), Danish former sport shooter
- Niels Petersen (weightlifter) (1918–1966), Danish weightlifter
- Niels Helveg Petersen (1939–2017), Danish politician
- Nielsine Petersen (1851–1916), Danish sculptor
- Nils Petersen (born 1988), German footballer

== O ==
- Olaf Petersen (photographer) (1915–1994), New Zealand photographer
- Olaf Wilhelm Petersen (1841–1909), Norwegian military officer and sports official
- Ole Gunnar Petersen (born 1934), Danish sailor
- Ole Holger Petersen (born 1943), Danish-born professor
- Ole Peter Petersen (1822–1901), Norwegian-American clergyman
- Olga Petersen (born 1982), German politician
- Oliver Petersen (born 2001), Norwegian footballer
- Oluf Petersen (1888–1964), Danish athletics competitor
- Otto Petersen (1960–2014), American ventriloquist and comedian
- Owen Petersen (born 1942), American politician

== P ==
- P. Walter Petersen (1878–1958), American politician
- Paige Petersen (born 1972), American judge
- Palle Petersen (born 1959), Danish footballer
- Pat Petersen (1959–2015), American long-distance runner
- Patricia Petersen (born 1964), Australian academic
- Patrick Petersen (born 1966), American actor
- Patty Petersen (born 1954), American actress
- Paul Petersen (born 1945), American actor, singer and writer
- Paul Petersen (criminal), American human smuggler
- Paulann Petersen (born 1942), American poet
- Peet Petersen (1941–1980), Dutch footballer
- Pete Petersen (politician) (born 1950), American politician
- Peter Petersen (actor) (1876–1956), Austrian actor
- Peter Petersen (musicologist) (born 1940), German musicologist
- Peter Petersen (soccer) (born 1981), South African soccer player
- Peter Petersen (sport shooter) (1892–1964), Danish sports shooter
- Peter Arnoldus Petersen (1851–1916), Norwegian businessman
- Peter Christian Petersen (1791–1853), Norwegian naval officer
- Peter J. K. Petersen (1821–1896), Norwegian businessman
- Petra Petersen (1901–1989), Danish resistance fighter and communist politician
- Poul Petersen (badminton) (born 1950), Danish badminton player
- Poul Petersen (footballer) (1921–1997), Danish footballer and manager
- Poul Petersen (swimmer) (1912–1959), Danish swimmer
- Poul Erik Petersen (1927–1992), Danish footballer

== R ==
- Rasmus Petersen (1877–1957), Norwegian gymnast
- Rasmus Helveg Petersen (born 1968), Danish politician
- Rasmus Minor Petersen (born 1988), Danish footballer
- René Petersen, Danish footballer
- Rene Eriksen Petersen (born 2001), Greenlandic footballer
- Robert Petersen (speed skater) (1914–2000), American speed skater
- Robert E. Petersen (1926–2007), American publisher
- Robert Storm Petersen (1882–1949), Danish cartoonist, writer and illustrator
- Rodney L. Petersen (born 1949), American scholar
- Roland Petersen (born 1926), Danish-born American painter, printmaker, and professor
- Ron Petersen (born 1934), American mycologist
- Rudolf Petersen (1878–1962), German businessman and politician
- Rudolf Petersen (Kapitän zur See) (1905–1983), German naval officer
- Ryan Petersen, American musician
- Ryan Petersen (businessman) (born 1980/1981), American businessman
- Ryan D. Petersen

== S ==
- Sandy Petersen (born 1955), American game designer
- Sara Petersen (badminton) (born 1975), Danish-New Zealand badminton player
- Sara Petersen (hurdler) (born 1987), Danish hurdler
- Scott Petersen (born 1970), American professional golfer
- Sergeal Petersen (born 1994), South African rugby union footballer
- Sherwin Petersen (born 1953), Canadian politician
- Sigmund R. Petersen (1936–2024), Former NOAA Corps Director
- Silje Brøns Petersen (born 1994), German handball player
- Simone Petersen (born 1997), Danish handball player
- Sofie Petersen (born 1955), Greenlandic bishop
- Sophie Petersen (1885–1965), Danish geographer
- Søren Petersen (1894–1945), Danish boxer
- Søren Petersen (weightlifter) (1890–1971), Danish weightlifter
- Søren Henrik Petersen (1788–1860), Danish printmaker
- Søren Juul Petersen (born 1963), Danish film producer
- Søren Ryge Petersen (born 1945), Danish television host
- Stephan Petersen (born 1985), Danish footballer
- Sue Petersen (born 1944), American marathoner
- Sunniva Austigard Petersen (born 2003), Norwegian footballer
- Susanne Sangaard Petersen (born 1959), Danish canoeist
- Suzana Petersen (born 1947), Brazilian tennis player
- Sven Petersen (born 1954), United States Virgin Islands bobsledder
- Svend Petersen (1911–1992), American political scientist
- Sydney Vernon Petersen (1914–1987), South African poet

== T ==
- Taliep Petersen (1950–2006), South African actor, singer and theatre director
- Ted Petersen (born 1955), American football player
- Teddy Petersen (1892–1991), Danish bandleader
- Thania Petersen (born 1980), South African visual artist
- Theodore W. Petersen (1837–1902), Danish-American brickmaker
- Thomas E. Petersen (born 1966), American politician, lobbyist and farmer
- Thorleif Petersen (1884–1958), Norwegian artistic gymnast
- Thyge Petersen (1902–1964), Danish boxer
- Tim Petersen (born 1986), German footballer
- Toby Petersen (born 1978), American ice hockey player and coach
- Todd Robert Petersen (born 1969), American novelist
- Tony Petersen (born 1966), American football player and coach

== U ==
- Ulla Petersen (1933–2005), Danish equestrian
- Ulrich Petersen (1927–2017), Peruvian-born American geologist

== V ==
- Vilhelm Petersen (1830–1913), Danish architect
- Vilhelm Petersen (painter) (1812–1880), Danish landscape painter
- Vinca Petersen, British photographer
- Vita Petersen (1915–2011), German American artist

== W ==
- Warren Petersen (born 1976), American politician
- Wilhelm Petersen (composer) (1890–1957), German composer and conductor
- Wilhelm Petersen (entomologist) (1854–1933), Estonian entomologist
- William Petersen (born 1953), American actor
- William Petersen (demographer) (1912–2004), American sociologist and demographer
- Wolfgang Petersen (1941–2022), German filmmaker

== Petersén ==
- Carl Petersén (army officer) (1883–1963), Swedish Army officer
- Carl Wilhelm Petersén (1884–1973), Swedish curler and Olympic medalist
- Eva Petersén (1923–2012), Swedish diver
- Marie Antoinette Petersén (1771–1855), Swedish musician
- Wilhelm Petersén (ice hockey) (1906–1988), Swedish ice hockey and bandy player

== See also ==
- Pedersen
- Peterson (surname)
- Pettersen
- Bjelke-Petersen family
