= Pettersen =

Pettersen is a Norwegian patronymic surname. Notable people with the surname include:

- Arne Pettersen (1906–1981), Norwegian sailor
- Atle Pettersen (born 1989), Norwegian singer and songwriter, lead singer of the band Above Symmetry
- Axel Gunerius Pettersen (1925–2021), Norwegian businessperson and politician for the Conservative Party
- Axel Pettersen (1864–1928), Norwegian businessperson and politician
- Bjarne Pettersen (1891–1983), Norwegian gymnast
- Britt Pettersen (born 1961), Norwegian former cross country skier
- Brittany Pettersen (born 1981), United States politician, elected to Congress in 2023
- Clarence Pettersen, Canadian politician, elected to the Legislative Assembly of Manitoba in 2011
- Egil Pettersen (1922–2010), Norwegian philologist
- Erling Pettersen (born 1950), Norwegian lutheran bishop
- Espen Bugge Pettersen (born 1980), Norwegian footballer
- Georg Pettersen (1803–1879) Norwegian politician
- Gunerius Pettersen (1826–1892) (1826–1892), Norwegian businessperson
- Gunerius Pettersen (1857–1940) (1857–1940), Norwegian businessperson
- Gunerius Pettersen (1921) (1921–2012), Norwegian businessperson
- Gunnar Pettersen (born 1955), Norwegian former team handball player
- Harald Pettersen (1869–1937), Norwegian businessperson and politician
- Hjalmar Pettersen (1856–1928), Norwegian librarian and bibliographer
- Jakob Martin Pettersen (1899–1970), Norwegian politician for the Labour Party
- Johannes Pettersen Løkke (1895–1988), Norwegian politician for the Labour Party
- Karin Pettersen (born 1964), Norwegian team handball player
- Karl Johan Pettersen Vadøy (1878–1965), Norwegian politician for the Liberal Party
- Knut Andreas Pettersen Agersborg (1765–1847), Norwegian politician
- Kurt Pettersén, Swedish wrestler who competed in the 1948 Summer Olympics
- Leif Pettersen (1950–2008), Canadian Football League receiver
- Marianne Pettersen (born 1975), Norwegian footballer
- Oddrunn Pettersen (1937–2002), Norwegian Minister of Administration and Consumer Affairs in 1989, Minister of Fisheries 1990–1992
- Øystein Pettersen (born 1983), Norwegian cross country skier
- Rasmus Pettersen (1877–1957), Norwegian gymnast
- Sigurd Pettersen (born 1980), Norwegian ski jumper
- Steinar Pettersen (born 1945), Norwegian former football and bandy international
- Suzann Pettersen (born 1981), Norwegian professional golfer

== See also ==
- Pettersen Ridge, ridge extending 11 km north from Sandho Heights in the Conrad Mountains of the Orvin Mountains, Queen Maud Land
- Petersen, surname
