= Axel Gunerius Pettersen =

Norwegian businessman and politician (1925–2021)

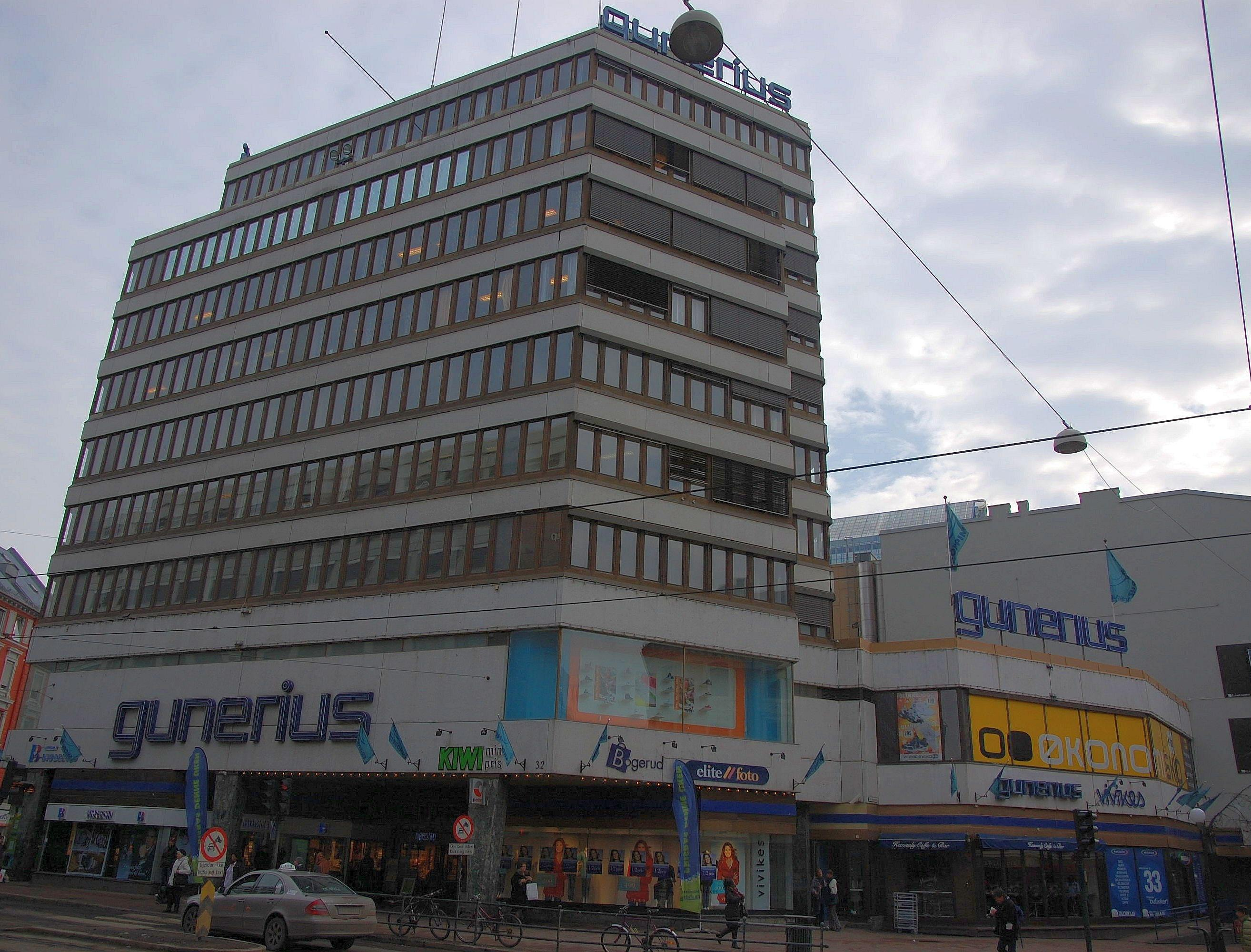
Gunerius Shoppingsenter.

Axel Gunerius Pettersen (28 September 1925 – 18 February 2021) was a Norwegian businessperson and politician for the Conservative Party.

He was a brother of Gunerius Pettersen and grandson of merchant Axel Pettersen, who owned the company Gunerius Pettersen A/S (now: Gunerius Shoppingsenter). Axel owned the company, which was founded by Gunerius Pettersen (1826–1892), together with Harald, Gunerius and Carl Pettersen who were all Axel G. Pettersen's granduncles. A fourth granduncle was Hjalmar Pettersen, the noted a librarian and bibliographer.

Axel's older brother inherited the family company in 1947, and after a few years Axel G. Pettersen replaced Christian Børs Pettersen as co-owner. In their time, the family company was expanded from operating a shopping centre to additional ownerships, such as the chain Bonus. Axel G. Pettersen was the chairman of Bonus Invest for many years.

Pettersen was a member of Oslo city council for eight years, and was a member of the financial committee of the Norwegian Olympic Committee. He was a deputy chair of the employers' association Norges Tekstilkjøpmenns Forbund.

He died on 18 February 2021, at the age of 95.
