= Gunerius Pettersen =

Gunerius Pettersen may refer to:

- Gunerius Pettersen (1826–1892), Norwegian businessperson
- Gunerius Pettersen (1857–1940), Norwegian businessperson
- Gunerius Pettersen (1921) (1921–2012), Norwegian businessperson
- Gunerius Pettersen (company)
