= Bibliotheca Norvegica =

Bibliography of Norwegian literature

Bibliotheca Norvegica is a four-volume bibliography of Norwegian literature edited by Hjalmar Pettersen. The four volumes were published between 1899 and 1924, and comprise together more than 3,300 pages. The first volume is titled Norsk boglexikon 1643–1813 and features a register of Norwegian books published prior to 1814. The second is titled Norge og nordmænd i udlandets literatur, registering Norway and the Norwegian people in non-Norwegian literature. The third has the title Norske forfattere før 1814 and the fourth Norske forfattere efter 1814, recording the works of Norwegian writers before and after 1814, respectively. Pettersen had also commenced on the fifth and the sixth volume of the bibliography before his retirement in 1926, but these were never finished, owing to his death in 1928. Every volume also has an English title, even though the bibliography was published in Christiania, Norway.

== Background ==
Hjalmar Pettersen was born in Christiania in 1856. He graduated with a cand.philol. degree in philosophy in 1882, and was employed by the University Library of Oslo in 1885. In 1898, Pettersen succeeded Jens Braage Halvorsen as chief librarian of the national department of the University Library. He started working with the Bibliotheca Norvegica immediately, in which he registered every work himself.

== Volumes ==
=== Norsk boglexikon 1643–1813 ===
The first volume in the bibliography is titled Norsk boglexikon 1643–1813. (Note: Full title: Norsk boglexikon 1643–1813: beskrivende katalog over bøger trykte i Norge i tidsrummet fra bogtrykkerkunstens indførelse til adskillelsen fra Danmark. English: Norwegian Book Encyclopædia 1643–1813: Descriptive Catalogue Over Books Printed in Norway in the Period from the Introduction of the Movable Type to the Separation from Denmark.) This volume is a catalogue of books published in Norway from 1643 to 1814, when the Constitution of Norway was first adopted. The volume is separated into two parts: one for the "real" book printings and one for the "poems of idleness". Every work in the volume is sorted alphabetically by author and chronologically by year of publication when part of one author's bibliography. It is the only volume of Bibliotheca Norvegica in which bibliographical entries are sorted alphabetically. It consists of 684 pages and was published in Christiania between 1899 and 1908. Pettersen's biographer in Norsk biografisk leksikon classifies this volume as Pettersen's "large contribution to the bibliography of Norway".

- Pettersen, Hjalmar (1899). Bibliotheca Norvegica. 1 : Norsk boglexikon 1643-1813 : beskrivende katalog over bøger trykte i Norge i tidsrummet fra bogtrykkerkunstens indførelse til adskillelsen fra Danmark. Christiania.

=== Norge og nordmænd i udlandets literatur ===
The second volume has the title Norge og nordmænd i udlandets literatur. (Note: Full title: Norge og nordmænd i udlandets literatur. Bøger og tidsskriftartikler om norske forhold. English: Norway and Norwegians in Foreign Literature. Books and Journal Articles on Norwegian Conditions.) This volume deals with the reception of Norway and Norwegians in non-Norwegian literature. The volume is based on Pettersen's 1897 work Travels in Norway, in which he registered foreign travels to Norway with corresponding travel reports. The volume grew so much, that it was split into three parts at a total of 850 pages. Although it is not sorted alphabetically, the third part of it features a reference over the books and journal articles listed in the volume. The volume was published in Christiania between 1911 and 1918, and comprises 289 pages.

- Pettersen, Hjalmar (1908). Bibliotheca Norvegica. 2 Saml. 1 : Norge og nordmænd i udlandets literatur : beskrivende katalog over bøger og tidsskriftartikler om norske forhold. Christiania.
- Pettersen, Hjalmar (1910). Bibliotheca Norvegica. 2 Saml. 2 : Norge og nordmænd i udlandets literatur : beskrivende katalog over bøger og tidsskriftartikler om norske forhold. Christiania.
- Pettersen, Hjalmar (1917). Bibliotheca Norvegica. 2 Saml. 3 : Norge og nordmænd i udlandets literatur : beskrivende katalog over bøger og tidsskriftartikler om norske forhold. Christiania.

=== Norske forfattere før 1814 ===
The third volume is titled Norske forfattere før 1814. (Note: Full title: Norske forfattere før 1814. Beskrivende katalog over deres værker. English: Norwegian Authors Before 1814. Descriptive Catalogue of Their Works.) This volume focuses on Norwegian authorship prior to the 1814 constitution, whilst Norway was in union with Denmark. In contrast to the other volumes, the selection of works in the third volume is not based on objective criteria, but Pettersen's own discretion. He chose authors which he considered to have a large national importance, and to be "independent of Danish literature". The volume comprises 289 pages and was published between 1911 and 1918.

- Pettersen, Hjalmar (1911). Bibliotheca Norvegica. 3 : Norske forfattere før 1814 : beskrivende katalog over deres værker tilligemed supplement til Bibliotheca Norvegica 1: bøger trykt i Norge før 1814. Christiania.

=== Norske forfattere efter 1814 ===
The fourth volume has the title Norske forfattere efter 1814. (Note: Full title: Norske forfattere efter 1814. Beskrivende katalog over deres i udlandet trykte værker. English: Norwegian Authors After 1814. Descriptive Catalogue on Their Abroad Printed Works.) It contains a register of works by Norwegian authors printed abroad, after 1814. It also included information on new editions and circulations of the works listed in it. It has 1800 pages and was printed in Christiania from 1913 to 1924.

- Pettersen, Hjalmar (1918). Bibliotheca Norvegica : Norske Forfattere før 1814 : [Register]. Christiania.

== Unfinished volumes ==
Before his retirement in 1926, Pettersen had started working on the fifth and the sixth volume of the bibliography. The fifth was intended as an addition to the second and the fourth, and had 168 pages when Pettersen died in 1928. The sixth was to be a bibliography on Ludvig Holberg and had 48 pages when Pettersen died. The sixth volume focused solely on Holberg, as Pettersen had been criticised for not having included him in the third volume of his bibliography.
