= Käthe =

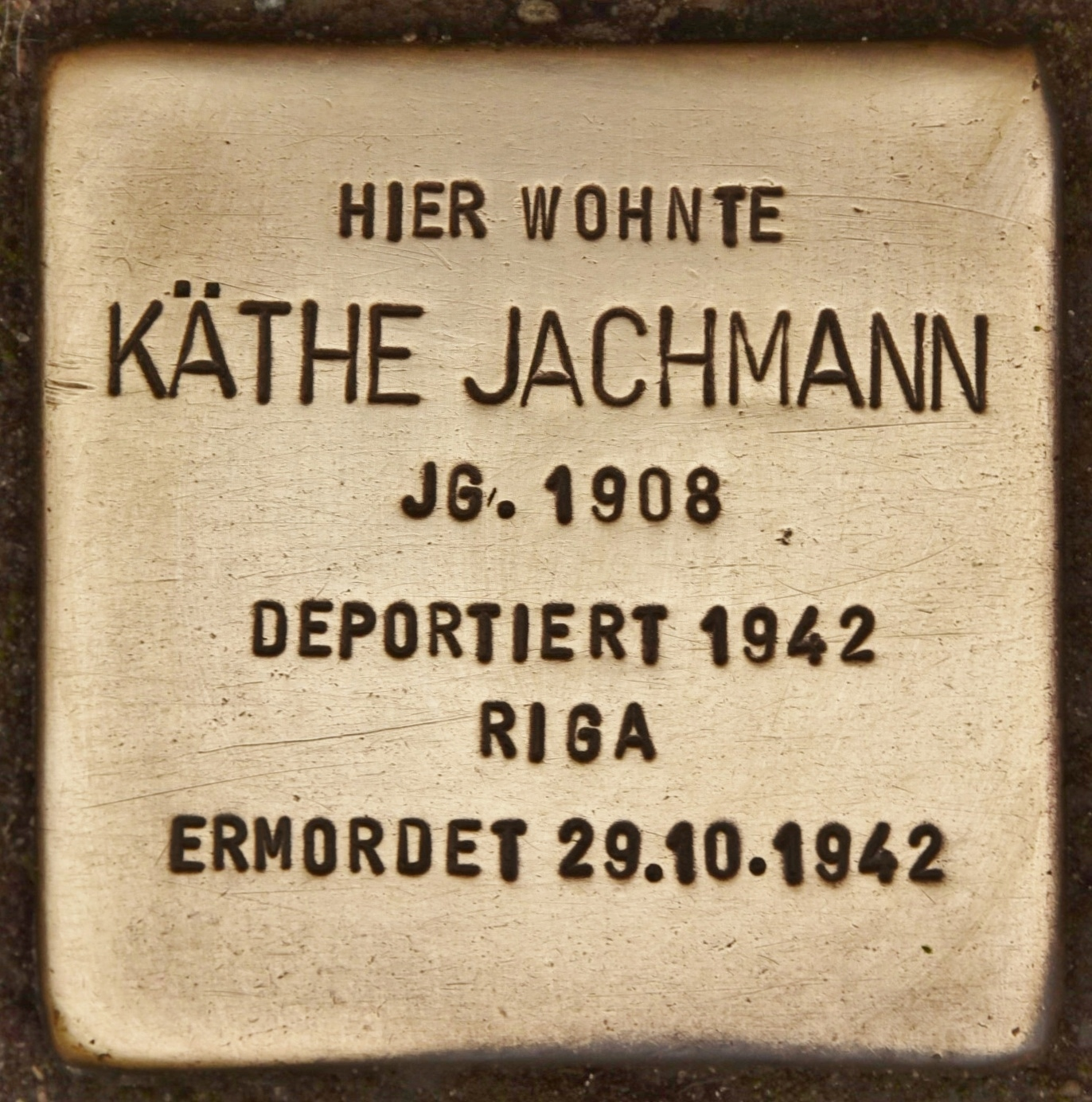
Stolperstein for Käthe Jachmann

Käthe or Kathe is a feminine given name, often a short form of Katharina. Notable people with the name include:

- Käthe Dorsch (1890–1957), German actress
- Käthe Gold (1907–1997), Austrian actress
- Käthe Grasegger, later Deuschl (1917–2001), German alpine skier
- Kathe Green (born 1944), American actress, model and singer
- Käthe Haack (1897–1986), German actress
- Käthe Hoffmann, German botanist who discovered and catalogued many plant species in New Guinea and South East Asia
- Käthe Köhler (born 1913, date of death unknown), German diver who competed in the 1936 Summer Olympics
- Kathe Koja (born 1960), American writer
- Käthe Kollwitz (1867–1945), German painter, printmaker, and sculptor
- Käthe Krauß (1906–1970), German athlete, 1936 Olympic bronze medallist in 100 m
- Käthe Menzel-Jordan (1916–2026), German architect and preservationist
- Käthe Petersen (1903–1981), German jurist and lawyer
- Käthe Pohland, East German sprint canoeist who competed in the late 1960s
- Käthe Sasso (1926–2024), Austrian child resistance activist
- Käthe Schirmacher (1865–1930), German writer, journalist, women's rights activist and journalist
- Käthe Sohnemann (1913–1997), German gymnast who competed in the 1936 Summer Olympics
- Käthe von Nagy (1904–1973), Hungarian actress

== See also ==
- Käthe Kollwitz Museum (Berlin), with a large collection of works by the German artist Käthe Kollwitz
- Käthe Kollwitz Museum (Cologne), with a large collection of works by the German artist Käthe Kollwitz
- Käthe Wohlfahrt, German company that sells Christmas decorations and articles
- Kathe Mou Skepsi, the fifth studio album by Greek musical group C:Real
- Ondu Muttina Kathe, Indian movie directed by actor/director Shankar Nag, starring Dr. Rajkumar in the lead role
- Ondu Premada Kathe (Kannada: ಒಂದು ಪ್ರೇಮದ ಕಥೆ), Kannada film is directed by S.M.Joe Simon
- Strange Angels (Kathe Koja novel), 1994 novel by American author Kathe Koja published by Delacorte Press
- Tabarana Kathe (Kannada: ತಬರನ ಕಥೆ), Kannada language film released in 1987 directed by Girish Kasaravalli
