= Strange Angels =

Strange Angels may refer to:

== Albums ==
- Strange Angels (Laurie Anderson album), 1989
- Strange Angels (Kristin Hersh album), 1998

== Books ==
- Strange Angels (novel), a 1994 novel by Kathe Koja
- Strange Angels, the first book in a series by Lilith Saintcrow (2009)

== Television series ==
- Strange Angels, alternate title for Czarne stokrotki (2025) in some markets

== See also ==
- Strange Angel, a 2018 historical drama web television series
