= Kathe =

Kathe may refer to:

- Kathe language: the Burmese term for Meitei language
- Kathe people: the Burmese term for Meitei people
- Käthe or Kathe, given name, multiple people
