= Travels in Norway =

1897 bibliography

Travels in Norway: A bibliographical essay (Norwegian: Udlændingers reiser i Norge: Bibliografisk meddelelser) was an 1897 bilingual annotated bibliography by Hjalmar Pettersen.

== Overview ==
It featured short individual entries for foreigners' travels in Norway with eventual travel reports listed. It was part of the yearbook series of the University Library of Oslo, with many sources from foreign libraries.
