= Gunerius Pettersen (1921) =

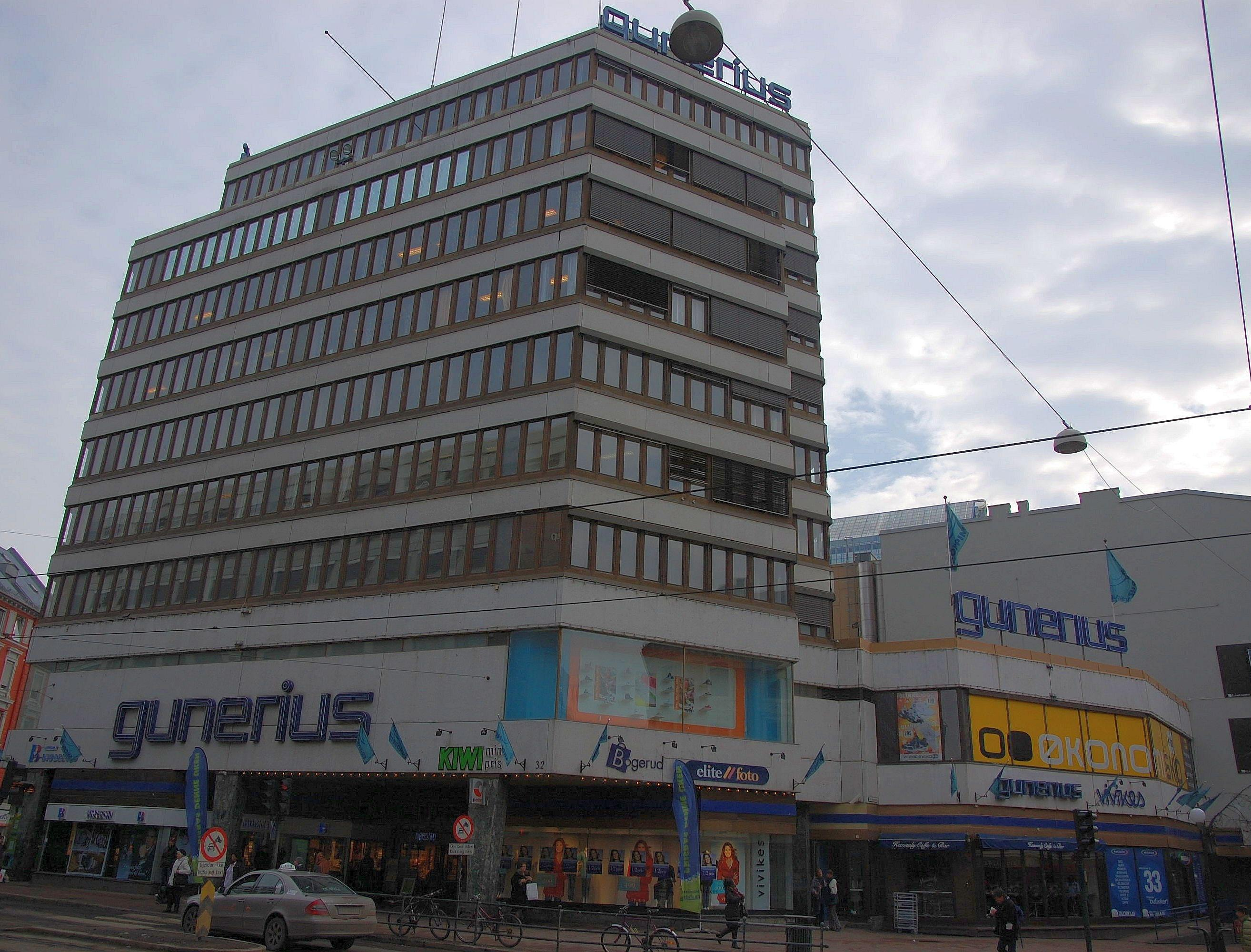
Gunerius Shoppingsenter.

Gunerius Pettersen (4 June 1921 – 6 May 2012), also known as Gun Pettersen, was a Norwegian businessperson.

He was born at the islet Lille Herbern, and grew up in Frogner. He was a grandson of merchant Axel Pettersen, who owned the company Gunerius Pettersen A/S (now: Gunerius Shoppingsenter). Axel owned the company, which was founded by Gunerius Pettersen, together with Harald, Gunerius and Carl Pettersen who were all Gunerius Pettersen's granduncles. A fourth granduncle was Hjalmar Pettersen, the noted a librarian and bibliographer.

Pettersen attended Oslo Commerce School and took higher education in St. Gallen. He inherited the family company in 1947, and owned it for some time together with Hjalmar's son Christian Børs Pettersen. Later, his own brother Axel Gunerius Pettersen replaced Christian Børs Pettersen as co-owner. In their time, the family company was expanded from operating a shopping centre to additional ownerships, such as the chain Bonus. Pettersen also served as consul for Bolivia.

He was an active yacht racer. Pettersen was chairman of the Royal Norwegian Yacht Club, as well as founder and board member of the Norwegian Sailing Federation. He died on 6 May 2012, at the age of 90.
