= Hjalmar Pettersen =

Norwegian librarian and bibliographer

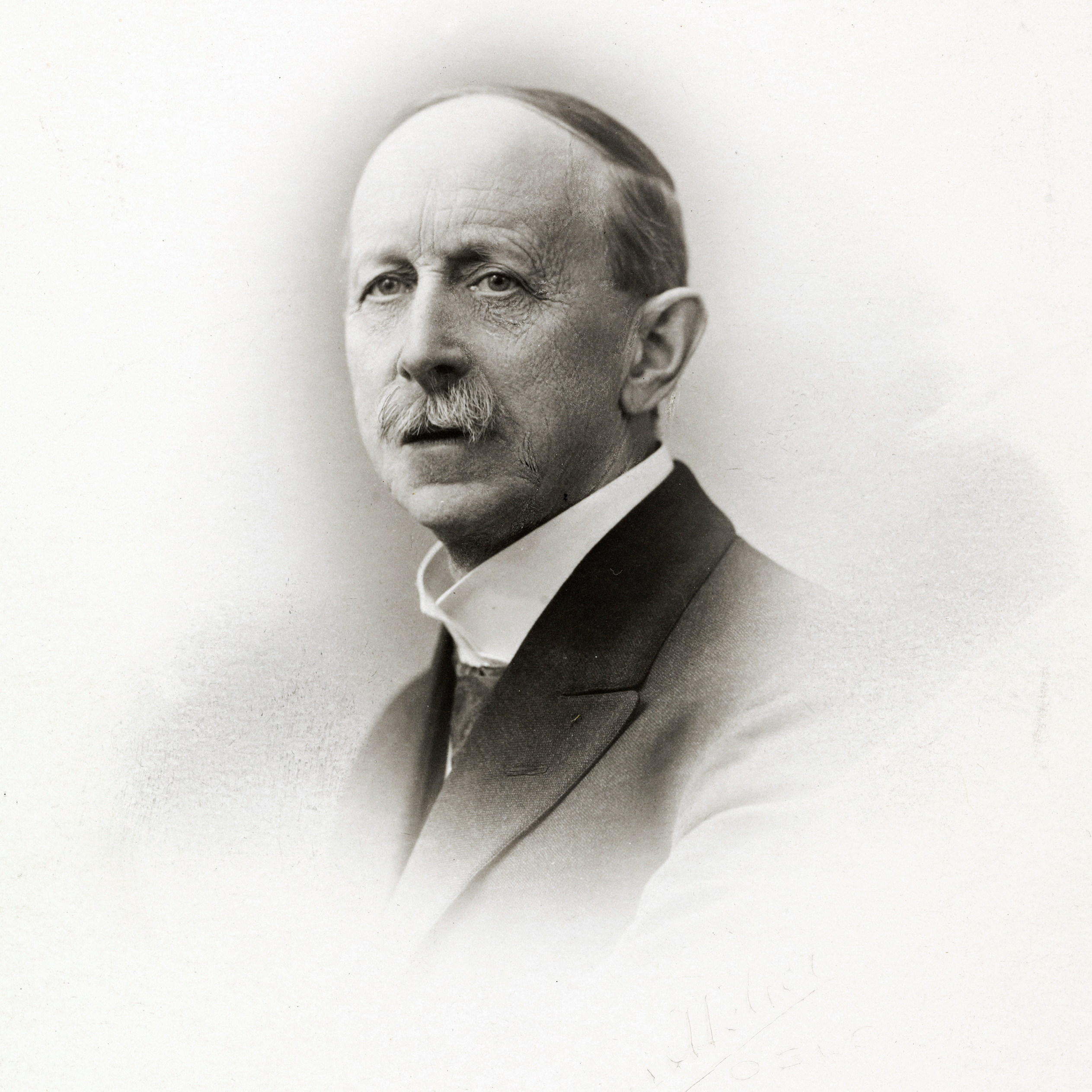
Hjalmar Marius Pettersen

Hjalmar Marius Pettersen (13 January 1856–18 January 1928) was a Norwegian librarian and bibliographer, best known for editing the Bibliotheca Norvegica, a bibliography of Norwegian literature. Born in the country's capital to a family of means, he became, early, a voracious reader, eventually embarking on a philological career. After longer stays in Paris, a city he adored, he sought a post at the University Library of Oslo, becoming employed as its lecturer in 1887.

In the 1890s, Pettersen published numerous bibliographies, sourcing rare and exotic works from libraries abroad. After the exit of his fellow librarian Jens Braage Halvorsen from the University Library, Pettersen occupied the position of chief librarian. Having begun on the Bibliotheca Norvegica around the end of the 19th century, he finished it four years before his death, leaving the first 21 sheets of paper for the fifth volume behind.

Having become a member of the Norwegian Academy of Science and Letters in 1903, he was rewarded by the Order of St. Olav in 1909. In 1928, two years before his eventual death, he was upgraded to a commander of the same order. His biographers usually describe him as an industrious yet gregarious man.

== Early years ==
As the eldest son of merchant Gunerius Pettersen (1826–92) and Iverine Grorud (1828–1905), he grew up in Storgaten, central Oslo. His father had founded a retailing company there, still visible as Gunerius Shoppingsenter, and Hjalmar's younger brothers, Gunerius, Harald, Axel and Carl, were active as company owners. The family business was flourishing financially, but the young Pettersen was of poor health and did not seek a mercantile career. He instead read voraciously, which precipitated his love for philology. In April 1895, Hjalmar Pettersen married the merchant's daughter Hildur Børs (1864–1947), and their son Christian Børs Pettersen took over the family company after Hjalmar's four brothers. Hjalmar Pettersen died in January 1928 at Bygdøy.

== Career ==
Hjalmar Pettersen enrolled in philology studies in 1874, specialising in Norwegian, French, English and German. According to the librarian Wilhelm Munthe, a 1875 visit to Paris paved the way for Pettersen's "faithful love" of France. After graduating with a cand. philol. In 1882, Pettersen was employed as a lecturer at the University Library of Oslo. He helped a fellow librarian , Jens Braage Halvorsen, who, according to Munthe, lacked "systematic librarian education".

In 1890, Pettersen published the work Anonymer og pseudonymer i den norske litteratur ("Anonymouses and Pseudonyms in Norwegian Literature"). His next work was the 1897 Udlændingers reiser i Norge ("Travels in Norway"), which was a part of the University Library's yearbook series on foreigners in Norway. After a government grant to Halvorsen in 1898, who wanted to finish his work Norsk forfatterleksikon 1814–1880 ("Norwegian Writers' Encyclopedia 1814–1880"), Pettersen succeeded him as chief librarian of the national department at the University Library. In the same year, he started working with Bibliotheca Norvegica, an annotated bibliography of Norwegian literature. It featured 3,300 pages on a total of four volumes, which were published between 1899 and 1924. He registered every collected work in the bibliography himself and often travelled to libraries and archives in foreign countries to find books and sources.

Pettersen retired in 1926. Before his retirement, he had started working on the fifth volume of Bibliotheca Norvegica, which was intended as an addition to the second and fourth volumes in the series. He had also started working on a bibliography titled Henrik Ibsen bedømt av samtid og eftertid ("Henrik Ibsen Assessed by Contemporary and Retrospective Society"). It featured collected works and quotations from the Norwegian playwright Henrik Ibsen and was published on Ibsen's centennial anniversary on 20 March 1928. Pettersen died on 18 January 1928 at Bygdøy in Oslo, aged 72.

== Honours and assessment ==
In 1903, Pettersen was appointed a member of the Norwegian Academy of Science and Letters. He was decorated as a Knight of the Royal Norwegian Order of St. Olav in 1909 and upgraded to a Commander in 1926. Since 1921, he was an Officier de l'instruction publique. On his 70th birthday, friends and colleagues bestowed him a government-funded Festschrift.

His biographer in Norsk biografisk leksikon, Odd Heide Hald, described him as a man with a "bitter tongue", but also a man who was friendly and extroverted in social life. The librarian Wilhelm Munthe called him a "cosmopolitan" and "literary nationalist" who was fond of travelling.
