= Axel Drolsum =

Norwegian librarian

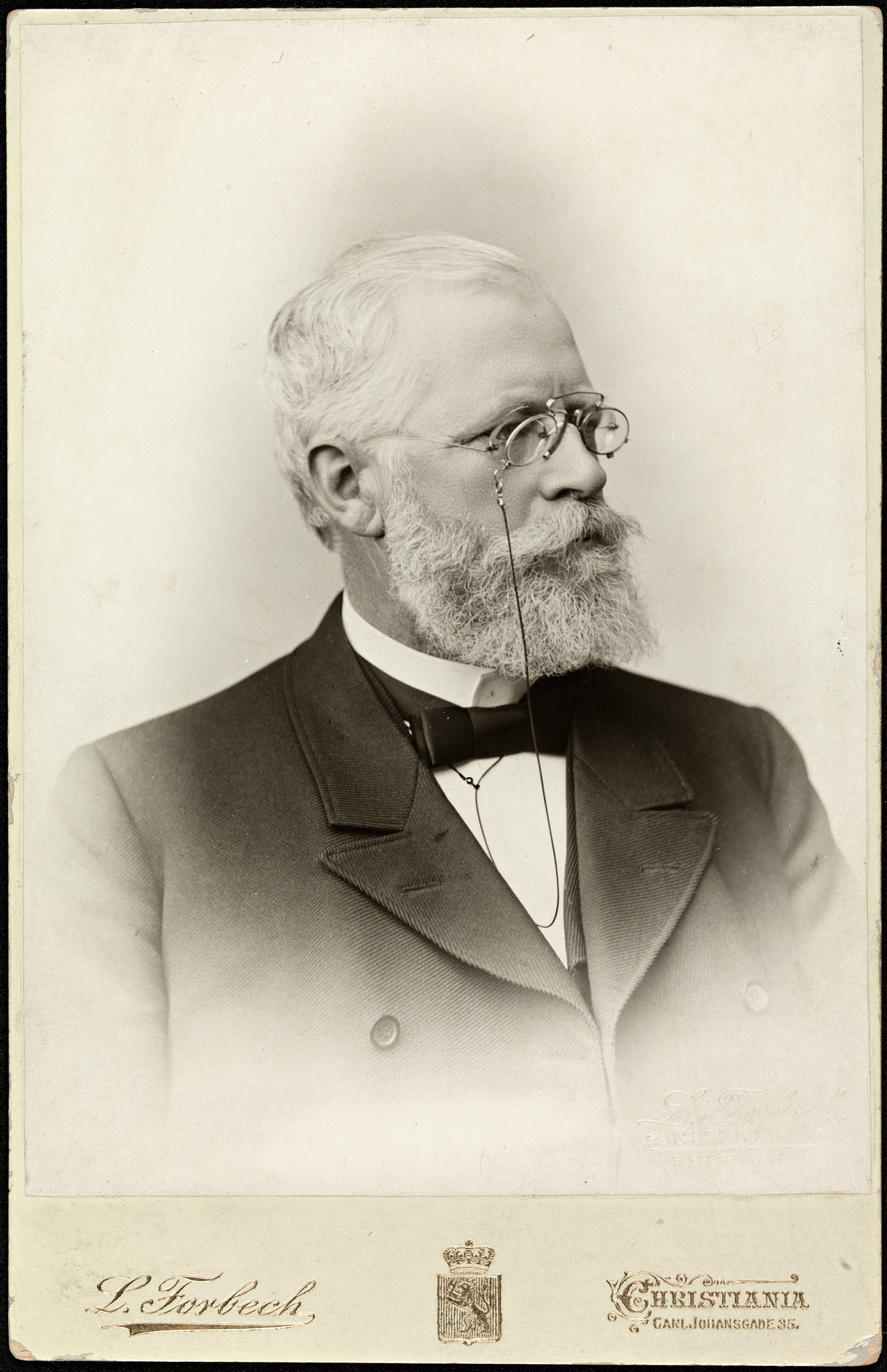
Axel Charlot Drolsum

Axel Charlot Drolsum (20 August 1846 – 16 September 1927) was a Norwegian librarian, who headed the University Library of Oslo from 1876 to 1922.

== Biography ==
He was born in Christiania (now Oslo), Norway as a son of military officer and businessman Truels Nicolaisen Drolsum (c. 1821–1892) and his wife Christine E. Knudsen (1821–1909). In May 1872 he married Therese Wurschmidt (1845–1924).

His eyesight prevented him from becoming a military officer like he wanted to, and after his examen artium in 1864 he also ruled out law studies. He instead studied Old Norse, and after four years of working with source texts he was hired by Ludvig Ludvigsen Daae at the University Library of Oslo. Together with Daae he edited the six-volume work on global history, Illustrert Verdenshistorie released between 1876 and 1880. He was promoted to chief librarian in 1876, and remained so until 1922. He worked to improve the library, and between 1911 and 1913 the building which is today the National Library of Norway was raised. He also worked for reinstating the legal deposit, greatly improving the library's collections; the endeavor was successful as the Parliament of Norway passed the act Lov om Afgivelse af Tryksager til Bibliotheket in 1882.

He was a member of the pro-military association Norges Forsvarsforening, and chaired the executive committee of its Kristiania branch from 1889 to 1915. He was a popular speaker and wrote articles in the press. Collections of his agitative works were published as For Norges Sag. Ti Aars Arbeide. Afhandlinger og Foredrag 1885–1895 in 1896 and For Norges Sag. Ny Samling. Tyve Aars Arbeide. Afhandlinger og Foredrag 1895–1916 in 1917. He was also a co-founder of the Norwegian Horticulture Society (Selskabet Havedyrkningens Venner) and he was a freemason from 1889.

For his work he was decorated as a Commander of the Royal Norwegian Order of St. Olav in 1897, Commander of the Order of the Polar Star in 1903 and received the HM The King's Medal of Merit in gold in 1911. He died in September 1927 in Oslo.
