= Johann Wilhelm Petersen =

German theologian (1649–1727)

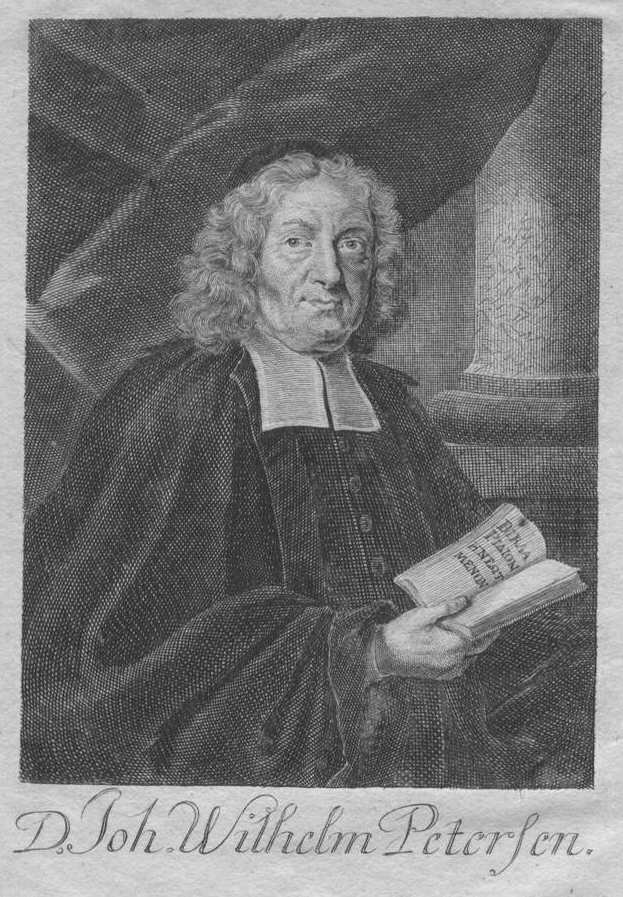
- Born: July 1, 1649; Osnabrück, Germany
- Died: January 31, 1727 (aged 77); Zerbst, Germany
- Occupation: Theologian

Johann Wilhelm Petersen (1 July 1649 in Osnabrück – 31 January 1727 in Zerbst) was a German theologian, mystic, and Millennialist.

Johann Wilhelm Petersen grew up in Lübeck and studied theology at the Katharineum in Lübeck, as well as in Giessen, Rostock, Leipzig, Wittenberg and Jena. He studied with Philipp Jakob Spener in Frankfurt, and they became friends in 1675. Through his affiliation with Spener, Petersen became interested in Pietism.

As a student, Petersen wrote a 1668 wedding poem for Dieterich Buxtehude. This poem was later composed as a cantata (Oh blessed, to the Last Supper of the Lamb is appointed BuxWV 90).

By 1677, Petersen was pastor of the church at Hanover. He was the leader and superintendent of the diocese of Lübeck in Eutin until 1688, and from 1688 to 1692 he was the superintendent in Aue.

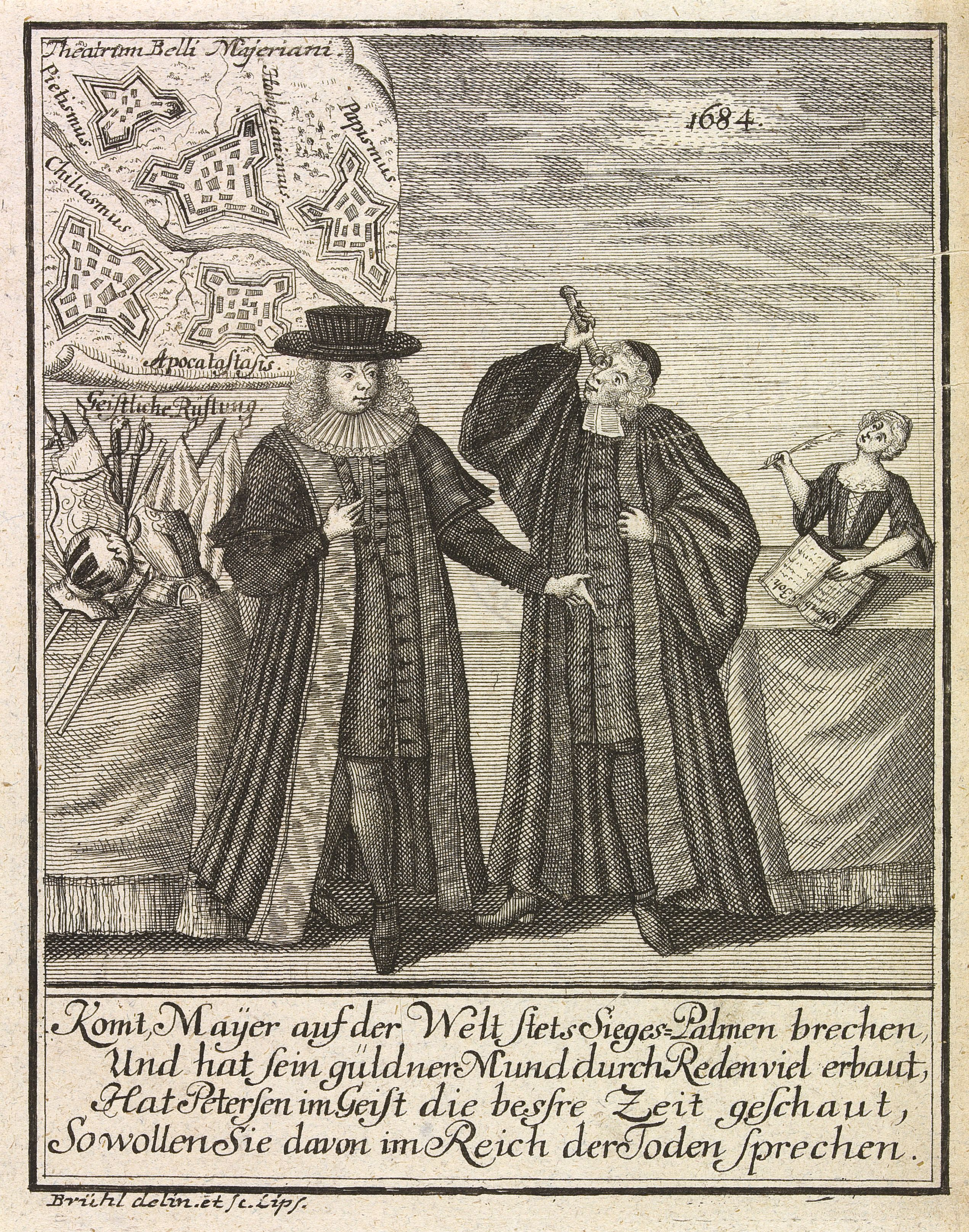
Caricature of Petersen and Johann Friedrich Mayer

In 1680, he published Acquittal Catechism, and fell out of favor with religious leaders and lost his position in the church because of his Chiliastic teachings.

Together with his wife Johanna Eleonora, he developed an independent form of spirituality in affinity with forms of pietism and mysticism. He spent the rest of his life on his property at low-Dodeleben, from 1724 to Thymern and Zerbst. Petersen wrote a book with the title Mysterion apokatastaseos panton to explain his lecture about the Origen's thesis: Apokatastasis. "What fruit has the doctrine of eternal damnation born up till now? Has it made men more pious? On the contrary, when they have properly considered the cruel, frightful disproportion between the punishments and their own sins, they have begun to believe nothing at all..."(Mysterion, p. 222)

Leibniz read and appreciated the book and in 1706 started exchanging letters with Petersen. He encouraged him to expose his views by composing a work in verse for which he provided ideas and guidelines. The poem appeared in 1720 with the title Uranias, qua opera Dei magna omnibus retro seculis et oeconomiis transisctis usque ad apocatastasim seculorum omnium and with a preface acknowledging the support.
