= Sunniva Austigard Petersen =

Norwegian footballer (born 2003)

Sunniva Austigard P.
Personal information
- Full name: Sunniva Austigard Petersen
- Date of birth: 1 October 2003 (age 23)
- Place of birth: Norway
- Position: Forward

Team information
- Current team: Viking FK
- Number: 23

Youth career
- 2015-2016: Hinna
- 2017-2018: Forus og Gausel
- 2020-2022: Viking FK

Senior career*
| Years | Team | Apps | (Gls) |
| 2018-2019 | Forus og Gausel | 5 | (2) |
| 2019 | Hinna | 11 | (1) |
| 2021-2022 | Viking FK | 37 | (15) |
| 2023- | Porsanger IL | 1 | (0) |
- * Club domestic league appearances and goals as of 17 June 2023

Sunniva Austigard Petersen (born 1 October 2003) is a Norwegian footballer who plays as a forward for Porsanger IL in the Norwegian Second Division.

== Career ==
In 2021, Petersen signed for Viking FK. During the 2022 season, she scored four goals during a 13–0 win over Stord.

== Personal life ==
Petersen has two sisters, Frida and Eir, who are both powerlifters for Norwegian club Sandnes AK.

== Honours ==
Viking

- Norwegian Second Division Group 4: 2021; runner-up 2022
