= Javiera Petersen =

Chilean economist (born 1990)

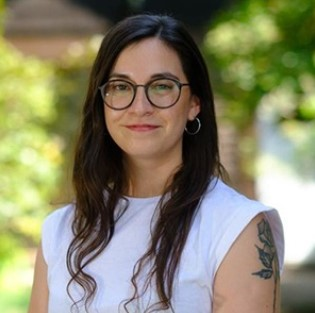

Undersecretary of Economy and Small Businesses
- In office 11 March 2022 – 11 March 2026
- President: Gabriel Boric

Personal details
- Born: 7 April 1990 (age 36) Valparaíso, Chile
- Party: Communist Party of Chile
- Education: University of Chile, University of London
- Occupation: Economist

Javiera Petersen Muga (born 7 April 1990) is a Chilean economist. She serves as the Undersecretary of Economy and Small Businesses, a role she has held since March 2022. She is a prominent member of the Communist Party of Chile (PCCh).

== Early life & career ==
Petersen was born in Valparaíso, Chile. She holds a master's degree in economic analysis from the University of Chile and a master's degree in economic governance and policy from the University of London. In 2022, prior to her government appointment, she was a PhD student at University College London.

Petersen is a co-founder and executive director of the Observatorio de Políticas Económicas (OPES), an economic think tank and applied research centre. She has also worked as an external consultant for the World Bank and as a researcher at the Microdata Centre at the University of Chile.

== Political career ==
In 2011, Petersen participated in the Chilean Winter, a series of student-led protests, which led to her involvement with the Communist Youth of Chile. During the 2017 presidential election, she was a member of the economic team for independent candidate Alejandro Guillier.

In 2021, Petersen worked on the presidential primary campaign of Daniel Jadue, mayor of Recoleta, contributing to the development of his economic policy platform. Following Jadue's defeat in the Communist Party primary, she joined the campaign of Gabriel Boric.

In February 2022, Petersen was appointed Undersecretary of Economy and Small Businesses by president-elect Boric. She took office on 11 March 2022; at age 31, she was the youngest undersecretary in Boric's cabinet.
