= Heidi M. Petersen =

Norwegian businessperson (born 1958)

Heidi Marie Petersen (born 22 March 1958) is a Norwegian businessperson.

She was educated with a Master of Science from the University of Trondheim. She was employed in Kværner Oil & Gas in 1988, moving to Rambøll Oil & Gas as managing director in 2000. She left in 2007, and is now an independent businesswoman.

She is the chair of Sandefjord Lufthavn AS and is a member of the boards of Aker Solutions, Norsk Hydro, Ocean Heavy Lift and Awilco Offshore.
