= Kathe Koja =

American writer (born 1960)

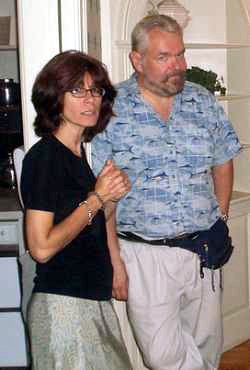
- Kathe Koja with Walter Jon Williams in 2005 (photo by Cory Doctorow)
- Born: 1960 (age 65–66); Detroit, Michigan, U.S.
- Occupation: Author
- Writing career
- Genre: Speculative fiction
- Notable works: The Cipher, Strange Angels, Straydog
- Notable awards: Bram Stoker Award, Locus Award

Kathe Koja (born 1960) is an American writer. She was initially known for her intense speculative fiction for adults, but has written young adult novels, the historical fiction Under the Poppy trilogy, and a fictional biography of Christopher Marlowe.

Koja is also a prolific author of short stories, including many in collaboration with Barry N. Malzberg. Koja has also collaborated with Carter Scholz. Most of her short fiction remains uncollected. Koja's novels and short stories frequently concern characters who have been in some way marginalized by society, often focusing on the transcendence and/or disintegration which proceeds from this social isolation (as in The Cipher, Bad Brains, "Teratisms," The Blue Mirror, etc.). Koja won the Bram Stoker Award and the Locus Award for her first novel The Cipher, and a Deathrealm Award for Strange Angels. Her prose has been described as "stunning". Author Mike Thorn described her novel Dark Factory as "a daring work of multisensory immersion."

Koja was born in Detroit, Michigan, the second of two sisters. She began writing when very young, but only became serious about it after attending a Clarion workshop.

Koja's literary works have been recognized and highlighted at Michigan State University in their Michigan Writers Series.

== Works ==
In regard to her earlier works, Koja says that the fundamental question at the heart of her stories deals with the philosophy of transcendence. Koja said, in an interview with Dark Echo, “When we will to be more than we are, what do we do? How do we choose what then to become, and how accomplish that becoming? And after transformation -- what?”.

This theme of transcendence applies to The Cipher, Bad Brains, Strange Angels, Skin, and Kink. Koja says that this transformative transcendence is explored in each of these novels either through a fundamental change of character experienced by a character, or, through the interaction with an actual presence such as the “funhole” in The Cipher.

Koja’s first novel, The Cipher, was originally entitled The Funhole. Editor Jeanne Cavelos published Koja’s novel through the Dell Abyss line. Dell rejected the original title.

On writing for young adults, Koja states that she loves the young adult genre for the fact that as an author, she is granted the ability to re-examine that aspect of life, including the highs and lows of adolescence. Koja describes this period of life as a place where change is inevitable and almost anything can happen, and to Koja that is exciting. In Koja’s stories, the characters themselves have a close relationship with art. Koja does this because in her personal life and travels, she encounters other writers who use their art as a place of shelter. The art of these individuals, in Koja’s eyes, are a reflection of themselves. Their art is likened to a mirror.

Koja's work is influenced by Shirley Jackson, Flannery O'Connor, Carter Scholz, and Sylvia Plath. The film Night of the Living Dead also was a big influence.

== Awards ==
Koja won the Bram Stoker Award and the Locus Award in 1992 for her first novel The Cipher, which was also nominated for the Philip K. Dick Award. She also won a Deathrealm Award for Strange Angels.

In 2002, Koja was also awarded the Humane Society's Kids in Nature’s Defense honor, and the American Society for the Prevention of Cruelty to Animals' Henry Bergh Award, for her novel Straydog. Koja is also the 2004 recipient of the International Reading Association's Children’s Book Award and the Society of Midland Authors' Children’s Fiction Award, for her novel Buddha Boy.

Koja’s first novel in 2002, Straydog, received positive reviews and awards. Paula Rohrlick, writing in Kliatt, praised Straydog as a "short, swift read … packed full of emotion." A critic for Kirkus Reviews added that "fans of tales about teen writers, or stories with animal themes, will pant after this." A contributor to Publishers Weekly described Straydog as a "solid if sometimes familiar tale of a high school misfit" that presents teen readers with a "compelling and sympathetic" protagonist in Rachel. Farida S. Dowler, writing in School Library Journal, noted that Koja's presentation of Rachel's growing "friendship with Griffin has romantic tension, but transcends high-school stereotypes," while in The Horn Book Jennifer M. Brabander concluded that the novel is a "fast but semi-sophisticated read for teens who haven't outgrown dog stories."

Praising The Blue Mirror as an "eerie, psychologically gripping urban tale" similar to the work of author Francesca Lia Block, a Publishers Weekly reviewer added that in her story "Koja explores the confusion between infatuation and real love—in all its cruelty and its redemptive powers." In The Bulletin of the Center for Children's Books, a reviewer gave special note to Koja's protagonist, noting that "Maggy's voice is articulate, controlled, and self-aware, which makes for intriguing reading." Of the novel, Koja noted on her website: "The Blue Mirror is concerned with vision, the way we see—or sometimes refuse to see—what's right in front of us, and what can happen when we open our eyes."

Koja's 2020 story collection "Velocities" was a finalist for a 2021 World Fantasy Award Best Collection.

== Personal life ==
Koja lives near Detroit, Michigan and is married to the illustrator Rick Lieder, who often does her book jackets. They have one son.

She is founding director of nerve, a Detroit-based immersive theatre company. Koja is a Democrat and a supporter of Mercy for Animals, PETA, and the Michigan Anti-Cruelty Society.

== Bibliography ==
=== Adult ===
- The Cipher (1991)
- Bad Brains (1992)
- Skin (1993)
- Strange Angels (1994)
- Kink (1996)
- Extremities (1997) (collection)
- Under the Poppy (2010)
- The Mercury Waltz (2014)
- The Bastards' Paradise (2015)
- Christopher Wild (2017)
- Velo/Cities (2020) (collection)
- Dark Factory (2022)
- Dark Park (2023)
- Catherine the Ghost (2024)
- Dark Matter (expected in 2025)

=== Young adult ===
- Straydog (2002)
- Buddha Boy (2003)
- The Blue Mirror (2004)
- Talk (2005)
- Going Under (2006)
- Kissing the Bee (2007)
- Headlong (2008)

=== Collections ===
- Extremities (1998)
- Velo/Cities (2020)

=== Short stories ===
- Happy Birthday, Kim White (1987)
- Professional Image (1988)
- Distances (1988)
- Skin Deep (1989)
- The Energies of Love (1989)
- Illusions in Relief (1990)
- True Colors (1990)
- Reckoning (1990)
- Command Performance (1990)
- Angels in Love (1991)
- Angels' Moon (1991)
- Teratisms (1991)
- The Prince of Nox (1992)
- By the Mirror of My Youth (1992)
- Letting Go (1992) (Pulphouse A Fiction Magazine Issue 9, June 1992)
- The Company of Storms (1992)
- Persephone (1992)
- Ballad of Spanish Civil Guard (1993) (collected in Mike Resnick's anthology Alternate Warriors)
- I Shall Do Thee Mischief in the Wood (1993)
- Leavings (1993) (co-written with Barry N. Malzberg)
- Rex Tremandae Majestatis (1993) (co-written with Barry N. Malzberg)
- The High Ground (1993) (co-written with Barry N. Malzberg)
- The Timbrel Sound of Darkness (1993) (co-written with Barry N. Malzberg)
- Metal Fatigue (1993)
- Arrangement for Invisible Voices (1993)
- In the Greenhouse (1994) (co-written with Barry N. Malzberg)
- Modern Romance (1994) (co-written with Barry N. Malzberg)
- The Careful Geometry of Love (1994) (co-written with Barry N. Malzberg)
- The Disquieting Muse (1994)
- Queen of Angels (1994)
- Literary Lives (1994) (co-written with Barry N. Malzberg and collected in Mike Resnick's alternate history anthology Alternate Outlaws)
- Buyer's Remorse (1995) (co-written with Barry N. Malzberg)
- Girl's Night Out (1995) (co-written with Barry N. Malzberg)
- Jubilee (1995)
- Mysterious Elisions, Riotous Thrusts (1995) (co-written with Barry N. Malzberg)
- Pas de Deux (1995)
- The Unbolted (1995) (co-written with Barry N. Malzberg)
- Waking the Prince (1995)
- The Witches of Delight (1995) (co-written with Barry N. Malzberg)
- DMZ (1995)
- The Unchained (1995) (co-written with Barry N. Malzberg)
- Three Portraits from Heisenberg (1995) (co-written with Barry N. Malzberg)
- Homage to Custom (1996) (co-written with Barry N. Malzberg)
- Ursus Traid Later (1996) (co-written with Barry N. Malzberg)
- Orleans Rheims, Friction: Fire (1997) (co-written with Barry N. Malzberg)
- In The Last Chamber (1997) (co-written with Barry N. Malzberg and collected in Mike Resnick's alternate history anthology Alternate Tyrants)
- Bondage (1998)
- Becoming Charise (2000)
- Jackson's Novelties (2000)
- The Doctrine of Color (2000)
- At Eventide (2000)
- What We Did That Summer (2001) (co-written with Barry N. Malzberg)
- Road Trip (2002)
- Remnants (2002)
- Lupe (2003)
- Velocity (2003)
- Anna Lee (2004)
- Ruby Tuesday (2005)
- Fireflies (2006)
- Myths & Legends (2006)
- Far & We (2008)
- Clod Pebble (2010)
- Toujours (2011)
- La Reine D'Enfer (2013)
- KIT: Some Assembly Required (2016)
