= Axel Pettersen =

Norwegian businessman and politician

Axel Pettersen (1 July 1864 – 29 July 1928) was a Norwegian businessperson and politician.

He was a son of merchant Gunerius Pettersen (1826–1892) and his wife Iverine, née Grorud (1828–1905). One of his brothers, Hjalmar Pettersen, was a noted a librarian and bibliographer. Three other brothers, Harald, Gunerius and Carl, were Axel's business partners.

In 1895 he inherited the company founded by and named after his father, Gunerius Pettersen. The company was passed down from his mother, and shared between the brothers Harald, Gunerius, Axel and Carl. They soon made important investments and expansions. A building, Storgaten 32 was bought in 1897, followed by Brogaten 2 and 4 in 1912. The company was expanded from a store to also encompass retailing and wholesaling.

Axel Pettersen was a member of the executive committee of Kristiania city council. He served as consul for Bolivia from 1909, chaired the employers' association Manufakturgrossistenes Landsforening, was a supervisory council member of Den norske Creditbank and Hypotek- og Realkreditbanken and a board member of the Norwegian Association of Hunters and Anglers.

Axel's son Gunerius (called Gunerius, Jr. even though he was the third Gunerius) was hired in the family company in 1916, and worked as a jurist. However, he died in 1928, only aged 34. Axel died later that summer. The family company was eventually taken over by Axel's nephew Christian Børs Pettersen, who was later joined by Axel's grandson Gunerius. The family company still exists in the same location, but the store is now named Gunerius Shoppingsenter.
