= Naimángitsoᴋ' Petersen =

Greenlandic politician (died 2013)

Naimángitsoᴋ' Petersen (Note: Also known as Naimángitsoq Petersen.) (1956 or 1957 – 18 July 2013) was a Greenlandic politician. He was a member of the Atassut party and later Inuit Ataqatigiit. He was a city councilor for Qaanaaq (Thule), and served as its mayor from 2001 to 2005, changing parties during his term. He was also a member of the Inatsisartut, Greenland's parliament, from 1995 to 1999.

== Early life ==
Naimángitsoᴋ' Petersen was born in either 1956 or 1957.

== Career ==
Petersen's political career started in 1983. That year, he stood for a city council election in Qaanaaq (Thule). In 1995, he became a member of the Inatsisartut, representing the Atassut party. He left the parliament in 1999. While there, he called for an end to the prohibition on reindeer hunting in Avannaa, saying that the people of the territory have made use of reindeer skin for protection from the cold.

Since at least 1995, Petersen was a member of the city council for the Atassut party. In 2001, he was elected mayor of Qaanaaq, the northernmost city of Greenland, and that year, refused to meet with Greenpeace. He met with crown prince of Denmark, Frederik, in 2004. The next year, he switched parties from Atassut to Inuit Ataqatigiit. He lost his position as mayor as a result, and became a city councilor.

== Later life and death ==
In his later years, Petersen had diabetes. He died on 18 July 2013 at 56 years old; he was buried in Qaanaaq.
