= Theodore W. Petersen =

Danish-American brickmaker (1837–1902)

- Born: Theodore William Petersen; May 1837; Holstein, Kingdom of Denmark
- Died: March 10, 1902 (aged 64); San Francisco, California, U.S.
- Other name: Theodore Wilhelm Petersen T.W. Petersen
- Occupations: Ship deck officer Brickmaker
- Spouse: Mary Doherty (m. 1866–1902)
- Children: 3

Theodore William Petersen (May 1837 – March 10, 1902) was a Danish-American brickmaker, brickmaster, and ship deck officer. Petersen was well-known, in California, for providing building materials for construction projects and for his signature product: the pressed brick.

== Early life ==
Petersen was born in the Holstein region of the Kingdom of Denmark on May 1837.

At age 14, Petersen traveled and served, for the next 12 years, in multiple roles on merchant ships (from cabin boy to captain). Petersen's notable role included serving as a second mate on a ship called Ocean Pearl in 1860 while traversing through Cape Horn.

In 1860, Petersen began to reside along the Americas' Pacific coast. On November 5, 1864, Petersen declared to become an naturalized American citizen, a request that was later granted on August 3, 1867. Petersen then moved to San Jose, California in 1865; where he resided for the remainder of his life.

== Brickmaking career ==
Petersen began to produce and manufacture bricks in 1872 and his signature product: the pressed brick in 1883. As of 1888, Petersen produced a total output of 7 million bricks per year; 600,000 of those were pressed bricks.

Petersen then co-founded a couple of brickmaking companies (all incorporated and operated in California) including: San Francisco and Mountain View Brick and Transportation Company in 1892 for $500,000 capital stock and Petersen Brick Company (also known as: Peterson-Kartschoke Brick Company) in 1893 for $100,000 in capital stock. At Petersen Brick Company, Petersen served as the manager of the brickyard until his resignation on April 20, 1896.

Petersen's bricks had a "wide and enviable reputation", according to many of his clients and customers in California, for its "superior and lasting quality", and had been manufactured with the greatest care. In an interview with Horace S. Foote, Petersen's pressed bricks were sold at a high price due to their "smoothness and uniformity in color". Additionally, the San Francisco Call described Petersen's bricks as one that are "protected from variations of temperature and rain while drying... in order to preserve the edges".

Petersen was a member of both the Ancient Order of United Workmen and the San Jose Board of Trade.

== Personal life and death ==
Petersen married Irish American Mary Doherty of Skaneateles, New York in 1866 and had three children together. The couple resided in San Jose from 1870 until Petersen's death in 1902.

On March 10, 1902, Petersen died of a heart failure in San Francisco at age 64.
