= Johanna Eleonora Petersen =

German author (1644–1724)

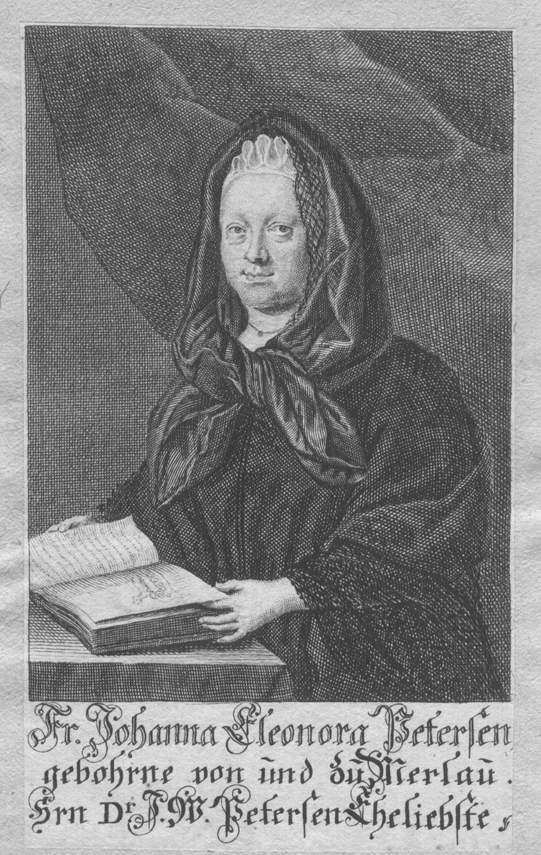

Johanna Eleonora Petersen (née von Merlau; 1644–1724) was a German theological writer and one of the leading figures of Radical Pietism. From 1680, she was married to Johann Wilhelm Petersen.

== Sources ==
- Jacoby, Daniel (1887). "Petersen, Johanna Eleonora". In Liliencron, Rochus von (ed.). Allgemeine Deutsche Biographie. Vol. 25. Duncker & Humblot: Munich & Leipzig. p. 512.
- Jacoby, Daniel (1887). "Petersen, Johann Wilhelm". In Liliencron, Rochus von (ed.). Allgemeine Deutsche Biographie. Vol. 25. Duncker & Humblot: Munich & Leipzig. pp. 508–515.
