= Michael Bang Petersen =

Danish political scientist (born 1980)

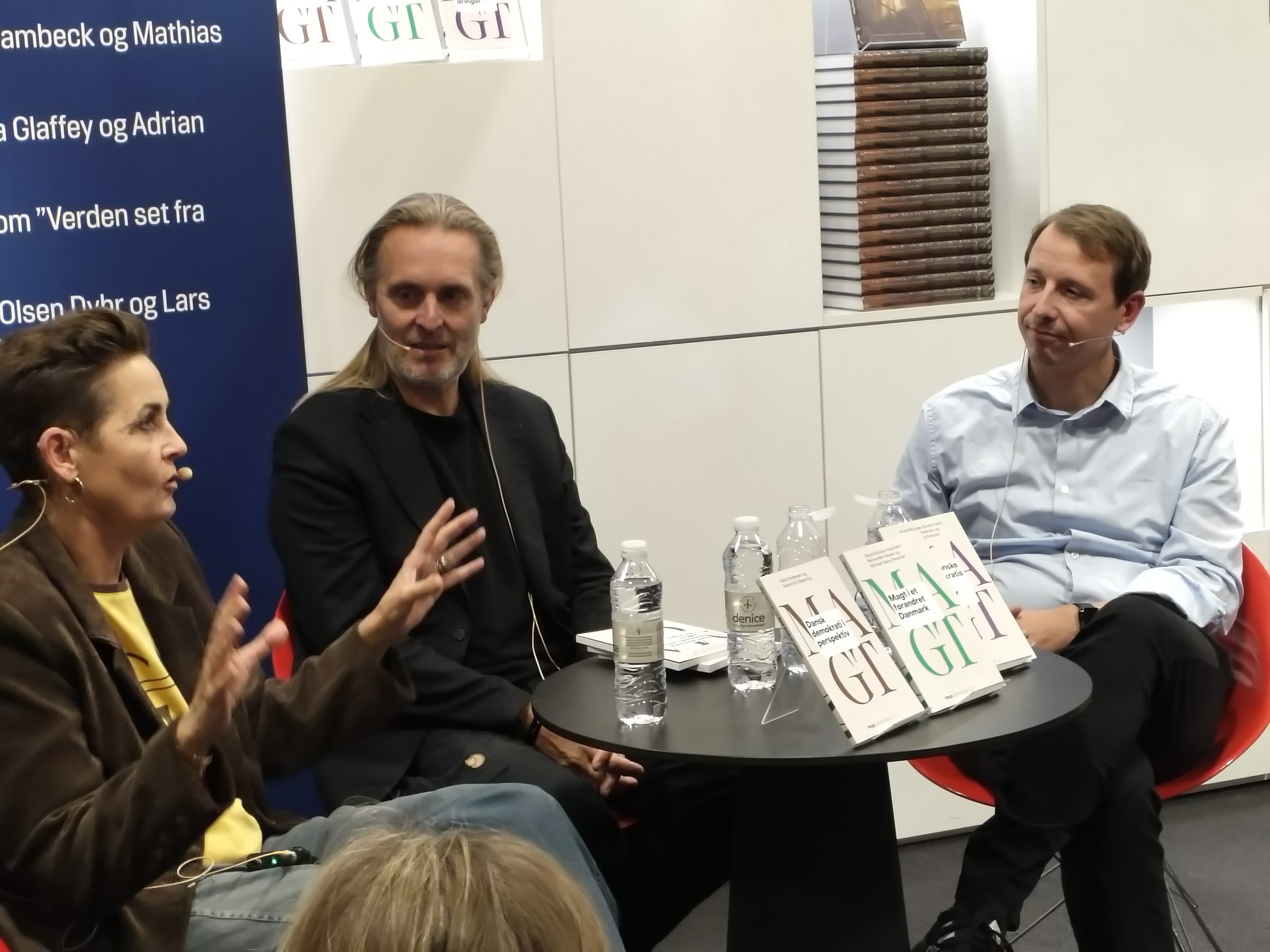
Bang Petersen (to the right) in 2025

Michael Bang Petersen (born 5 January 1980) is a Danish political scientist. He is a professor at Aarhus University, with research focusing on human evolutionary psychology and its role in politics. Starting in 2020, he led HOPE, a project examining responses to the COVID-19 pandemic in democratic countries and contributing to the Danish government's response to the pandemic.

== Biography ==
Petersen was born on 5 January 1980 in Kolding, Denmark. He earned a PhD in political science from Aarhus University in 2007.

In 2022, he was elected a member of the Academia Europaea.

== Research ==
Since 2020, Petersen has led the HOPE project, researching global attitudes to the COVID-19 pandemic and advising the Danish government. The project's mission of transparently explaining how COVID-19 restrictions in Denmark to prevent the spread of SARS-CoV-2 helped Danish citizens maintain confidence in the government and contributed to Denmark's relatively successful handling of the early stages of the pandemic. For his work on citizen and government trust in Denmark during the pandemic, he earned the 2022 Forskningskommunikationsprisen (Research Communication Award) from the Danish Ministry of Higher Education and Science.

Peterson is also the director of the Research on Online Political Hostility Project through the Aarhus University, School of Business and Social Science. He has researched the evolutionary foundations of political misinformation, fake news, and conspiracy theory beliefs.

Peterson has contributed to and been cited in newspapers and magazines including The New York Times, The Atlantic, The Washington Post, and The Irish Times.
