= Harald Pettersen =

Norwegian politician

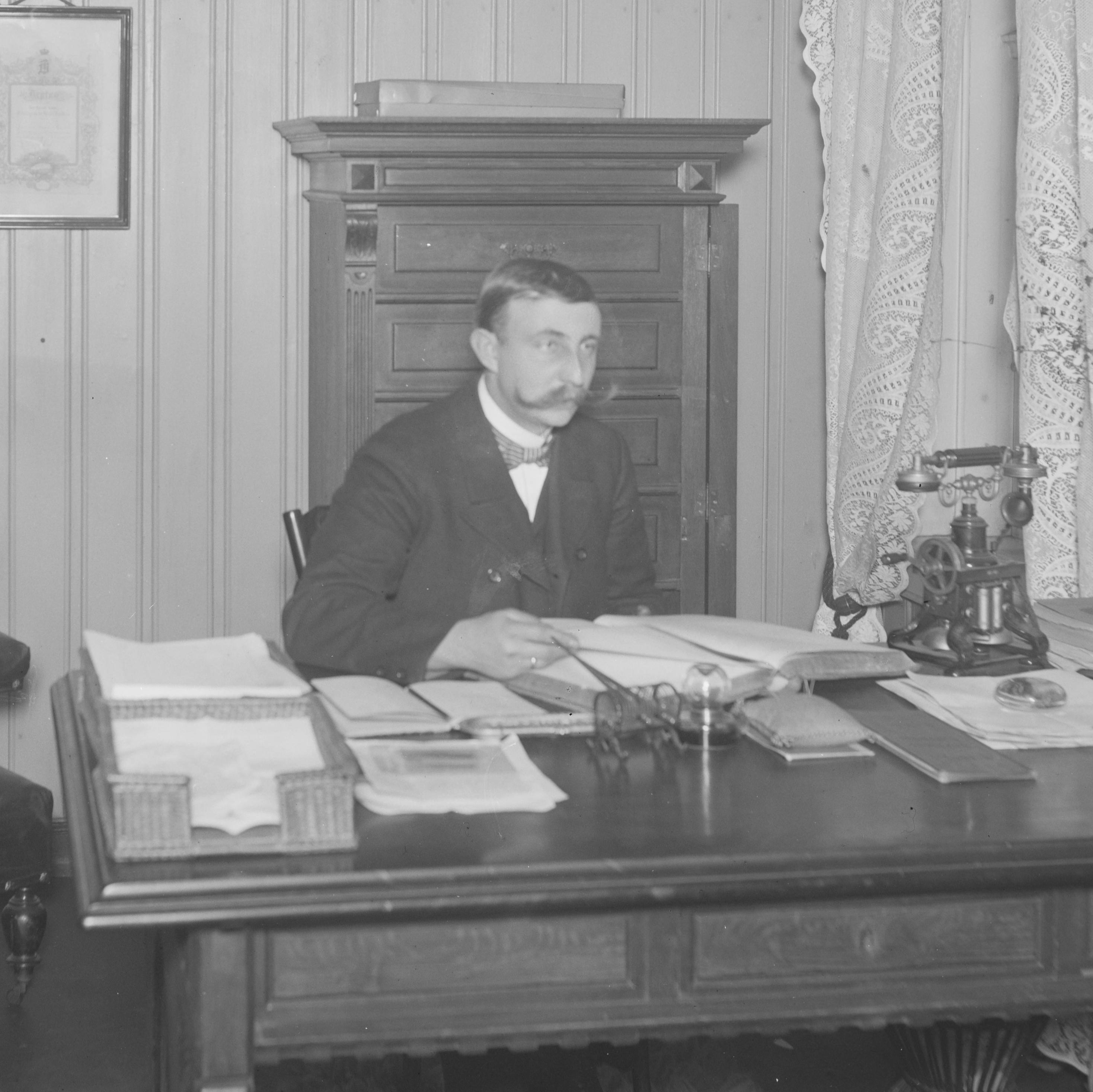
Harald Pettersen behind his desk at the offices of Gunerius Pettersen Credit: Narve Skarpmoen

Harald Nicolai Pettersen (27 February 1869 – 27 October 1937) was a Norwegian businessperson and politician.

== Biography ==
He was born in Christiania as a son of merchant Gunerius Pettersen (1826–1892) and his wife Iverine, née Grorud (1828–1905). One of his brothers, Hjalmar Pettersen, was a noted a librarian and bibliographer. Three other brothers, Gunerius, Axel and Carl, were Harald's business partners.

He took his commercial education in England and Germany. In 1895 he inherited the company founded by and named after his father, Gunerius Pettersen. The company was passed down from his mother, and shared between the brothers Harald, Gunerius, Axel and Carl. They soon made important investments and expansions. The building at Storgaten 32 was bought in 1897, followed by Brogaten 2 and 4 in 1912. The company was expanded from a store to also encompass retailing and wholesaling.

Harald Pettersen chaired the professional association Oslo Kjøbmandsforening from 1902 to 1905 and 1910 to 1911. He served as consul for the Netherlands from 1910 to 1921, and was elected as a deputy representative to the Parliament of Norway from Hammersborg in 1906. He was a deputy during the term 1907–1909 for Ole Olsen Malm, but met in Parliament in 1908 and 1909.

Harald Pettersen was decorated as an Officer of the Order of Orange-Nassau. He died in October 1937 and was buried at Vår Frelsers gravlund. The company Gunerius Pettersen was eventually taken over by Harald's nephew Christian Børs Pettersen, who was joined by a grandnephew Gunerius. The family company still exists in the same location, but the store is now named Gunerius Shoppingsenter.
