= Käthe Petersen =

German jurist and lawyer (1903–1981)

Käthe Petersen (born 13 May 1903 in Elmshorn; died 10 January 1981 in Hamburg) was a German National Socialist lawyer and social politician. From 1923 to 1926, Petersen studied law and political science, psychology and economics at the universities of Giessen, Freiburg in Breisgau and Hamburg. Petersen then embarked on the higher administrative career and was employed in Hamburg as an assessor in the legal department of the Social Welfare Authority in 1932, then, in 1937, Petersen was a deputy director of the welfare department in the Hamburg Social Administration, was promoted to Senate Councilor there in 1939 and took over this year the management of health and vulnerable care. She was involved in the creation and development of social assistance law, the section "Vulnerability" in the Federal Social Assistance Act (BSHG) being conceptualized by Petersen. Petersen was considered a proponent of a never enacted preservation law, which was to regulate the legal basis for the forced placement of so-called "asocials" and "inferiors." The practice of collective guardianship practiced in Hamburg was already criticized during the Nazi era, since a legal loophole would be exploited for the incapacitation of prostitutes by means of the abusively used argument of "mental weakness," according to a J. Enge. Petersen, however, responded to these concerns by arguing that the incapacitation of prostitutes according to the method practiced in Hamburg was lawful on the basis of case law on the part of the competent courts.
