= Gunerius Pettersen (1857–1940) =

Norwegian businessman

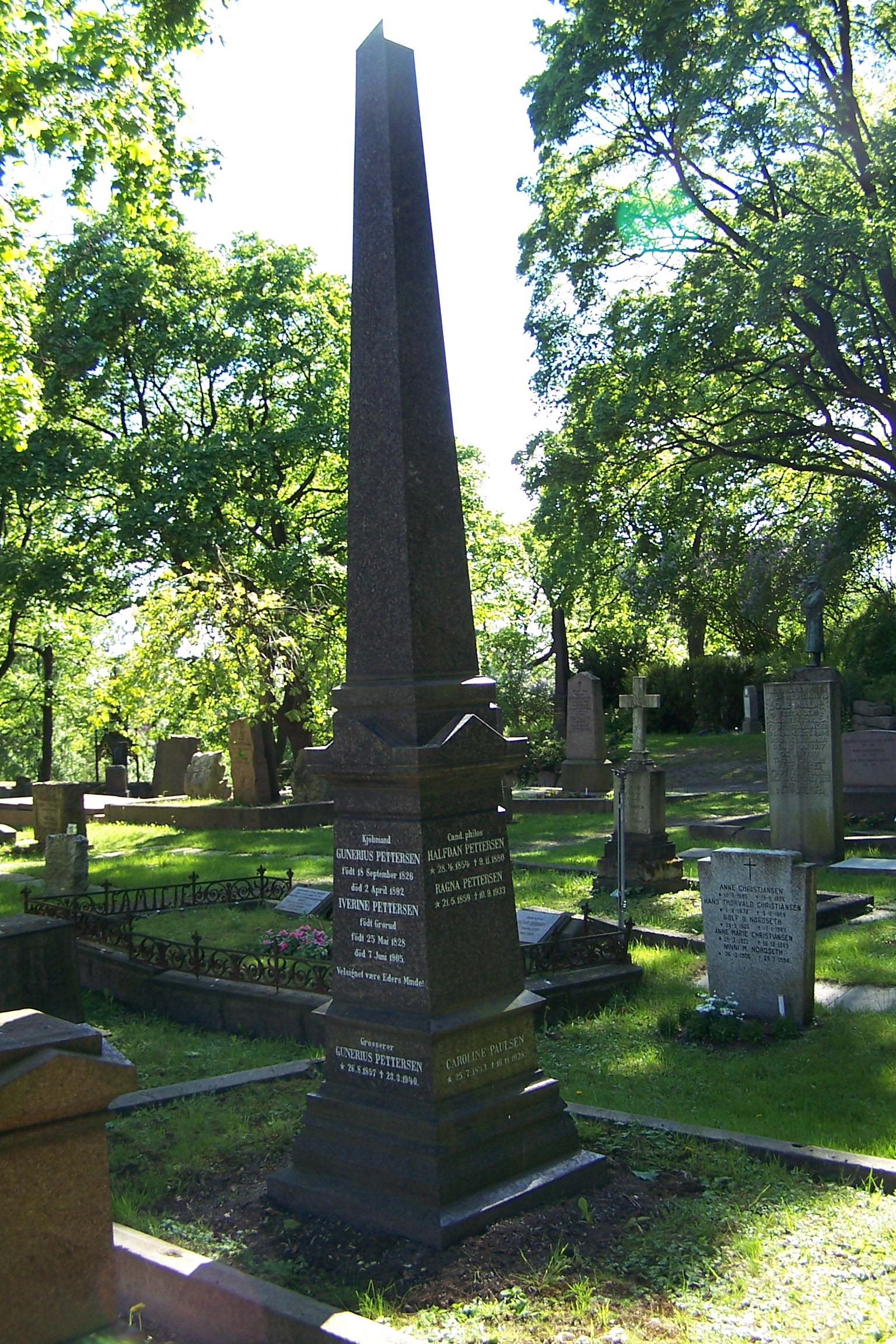
Monument in Vår Frelsers gravlund to Gunerius Pettersen, his parents and other relatives.

Gunerius Pettersen (26 August 1857 – 23 March 1940) was a Norwegian businessperson.

He was a son of merchant Gunerius Pettersen (1826–1892) and his wife Iverine, née Grorud (1828–1905). One of his brothers, Hjalmar Pettersen, was a noted librarian and bibliographer. Three other brothers, Harald, Axel and Carl, were Gunerius's business partners.

In 1895 he inherited the company founded by and named after his father, Gunerius Pettersen. The company was passed down from his mother, and shared between the brothers Harald, Gunerius, Axel and Carl. They soon made important investments and expansions. A building, Storgaten 32 was bought in 1897, followed by Brogaten 2 and 4 in 1912. The company was expanded from a store to also encompass retailing and wholesaling.

By 1937, the ownership was just shared between Harald and Gunerius.

Harald Pettersen died in March 1940 and was buried at Vår Frelsers gravlund. Marshals at his funeral were Admiral Berglund and General Ivar Aavatsmark. The company Gunerius Pettersen was eventually taken over by Gunerius's nephew Christian Børs Pettersen, who was joined by a grandnephew Gunerius. The family company still exists in the same location, but the store is now named Gunerius Shoppingsenter.
