= Strange Angels (novel) =

1994 novel by Kathe Koja

- Cover of the 1994 Delacorte Press edition
- Author: Kathe Koja
- Language: English
- Genre: Horror
- Publisher: Delacorte Press
- Publication date: May 1994
- Publication place: United States
- Pages: 320
- ISBN: 978-0-385-30892-2

Strange Angels is a 1994 horror novel by American author Kathe Koja, published by Delacorte Press.

== Plot ==
Grant, an industrial photographer between jobs, shares an apartment with his art therapist girlfriend Johnna. Directionless and unable to garner any sort of initiative or ambition, Grant is in the midst of an identity crisis and has done nothing for months, paying the rent from his savings while Johnna pays the other bills with her salary.

Perhaps intentionally, Johnna leaves a patient's artwork for Grant to find. He finds the images in the drawings powerful, compelling, transcendent and immediately determines he must meet the artist. Johnna indignantly refuses to cooperate, claiming therapist-patient confidentiality.

Immediately resorting to subterfuge, Grant discovers Robin, 28, the creator of the artwork and a schizophrenic, recently released from the hospital to a halfway house and attending Johnna's weekly therapy sessions. To Johnna's mounting fury and dismay, Grant cultivates a friendship with Robin, and she finally leaves when Robin moves into the apartment with Grant.

The two men have a strange symbiotic friendship, with Robin as a guru-like figure producing his drawings for Grant, who finds they bring a whole new meaning to his life, and Grant taking care of the increasingly vulnerable Robin's emotional and physical needs.

Slow at first, then rapid changes in Robin's metaemotional condition are catalyzed when a mentally ill young woman is introduced into the mix and all the instability culminates when Robin (to Grant's eyes anyway) transcends the physical and becomes a being of light shortly before his body dies of heart failure en route to the emergency room.

The novel ends with Grant vowing to himself to push the envelope in search of altered states to higher awareness.
