= Jens Braage Halvorsen =

Norwegian librarian and literary historian (1845–1900)

- Born: 7 March 1845; Bergen, Norway
- Died: 22 February 1900 (aged 54)
- Occupations: Librarian, magazine editor and literary historian
- Awards: Order of St. Olav

Jens Braage Halvorsen (7 March 1845 – 22 February 1900) was a Norwegian librarian, magazine editor and literary historian.

Halvorsen was born in Bergen, Norway. In 1866, he relocated to Christiania (now Oslo). He edited the magazine Ny Illustreret Tidende from 1880 to 1883. He is particularly known for his principal work, the encyclopedia of Norwegian writers, Norsk forfatterlexikon, which was issued from 1881 until his death. The encyclopedia was finished in 1908 by Halvdan Koht. Halvorsen was Norwegian editor for the first edition of the encyclopedia Salmonsens Konversations-Lexikon.

He was decorated Knight of the Royal Norwegian Order of St. Olav in 1896.
