= University of Oslo Library =

Library in Oslo, Norway

Coordinates: 59°56′19″N 10°43′17″E

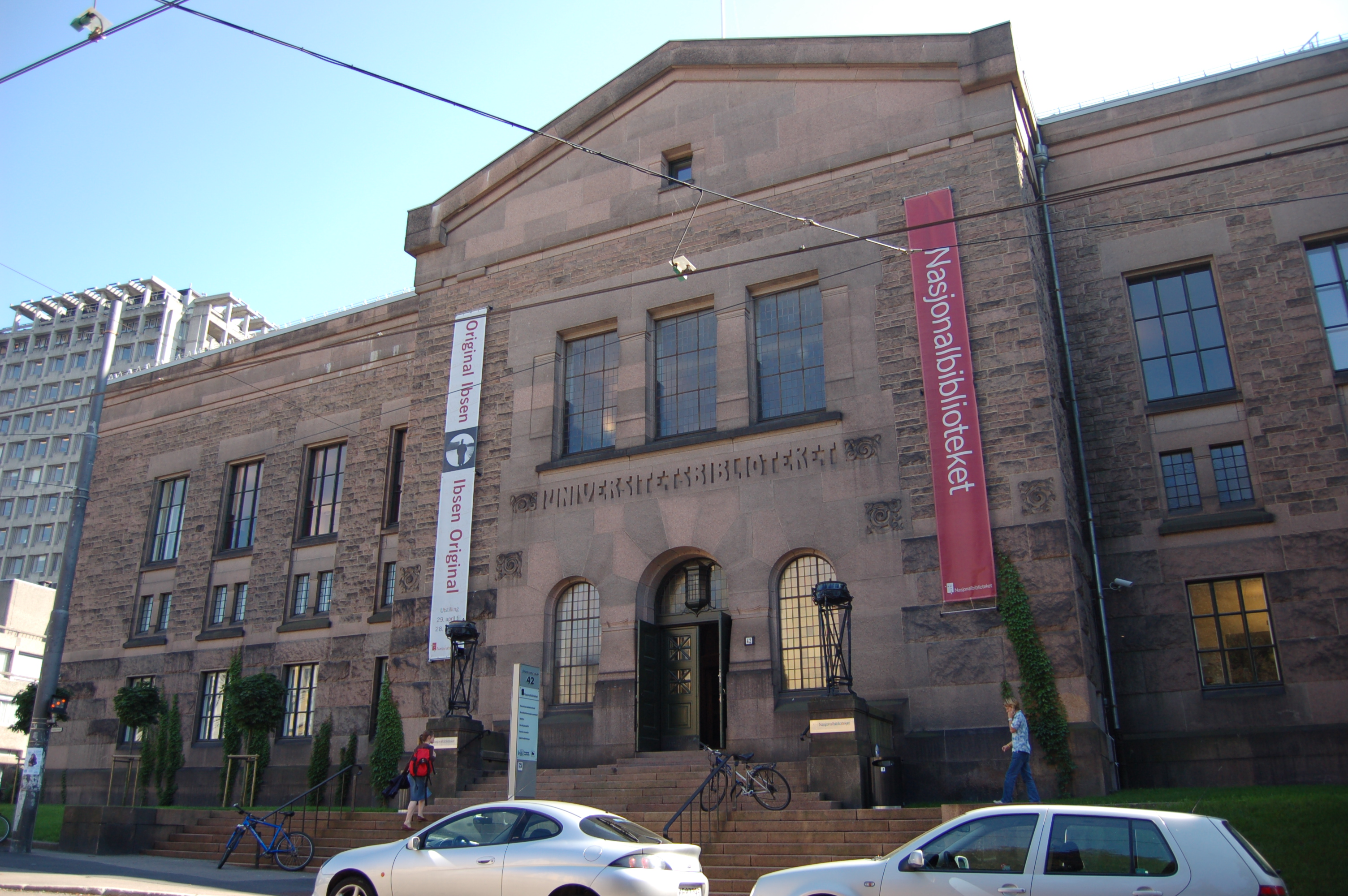
The former building from 1913, today used by the National Library of Norway

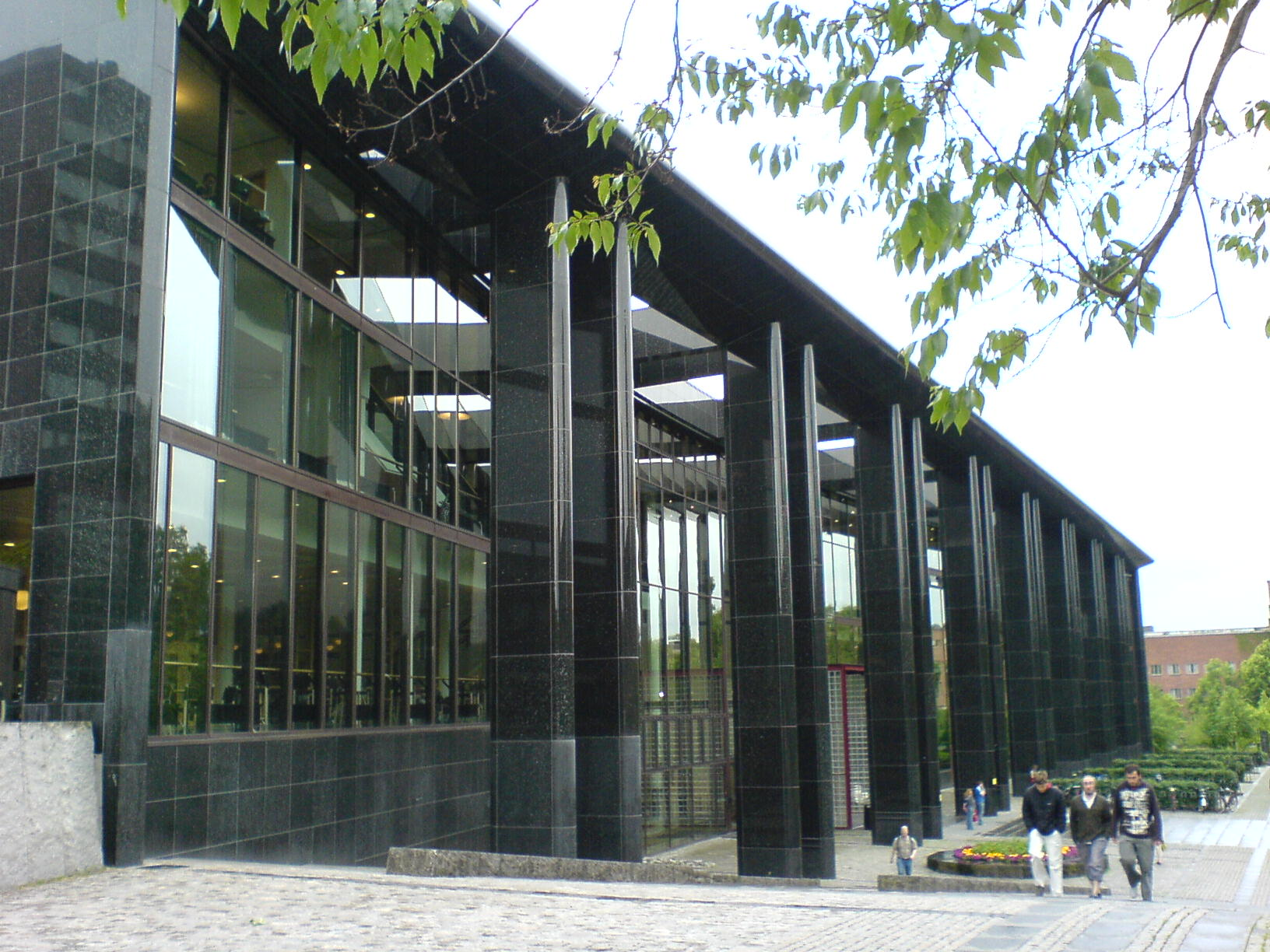
The current main building, Georg Sverdrup's House

The University of Oslo Library (Norwegian: Universitetsbiblioteket i Oslo, UBO) is a library connected to the University of Oslo.

Like the university, it was established in 1811 with Georg Sverdrup as the first head librarian. It originally doubled as the Norwegian national library, and was located at the old University of Oslo campus.

In 1913 the current library building in Henrik Ibsens gate was completed. Head librarian at the time, from 1876 to 1922, was Axel Drolsum.

In 1989 the institution National Library of Norway was established. It finally took over the national library tasks from the University Library in 1998, allowing the latter to concentrate on university matters. The same year, the University Library left the building in Henrik Ibsens gate for the newly constructed Georg Sverdrup's House, located at the modern University of Oslo campus at Blindern.

== See also ==
- List of libraries in Norway
