= Gunerius Pettersen (1826–1892) =

Norwegian businessman

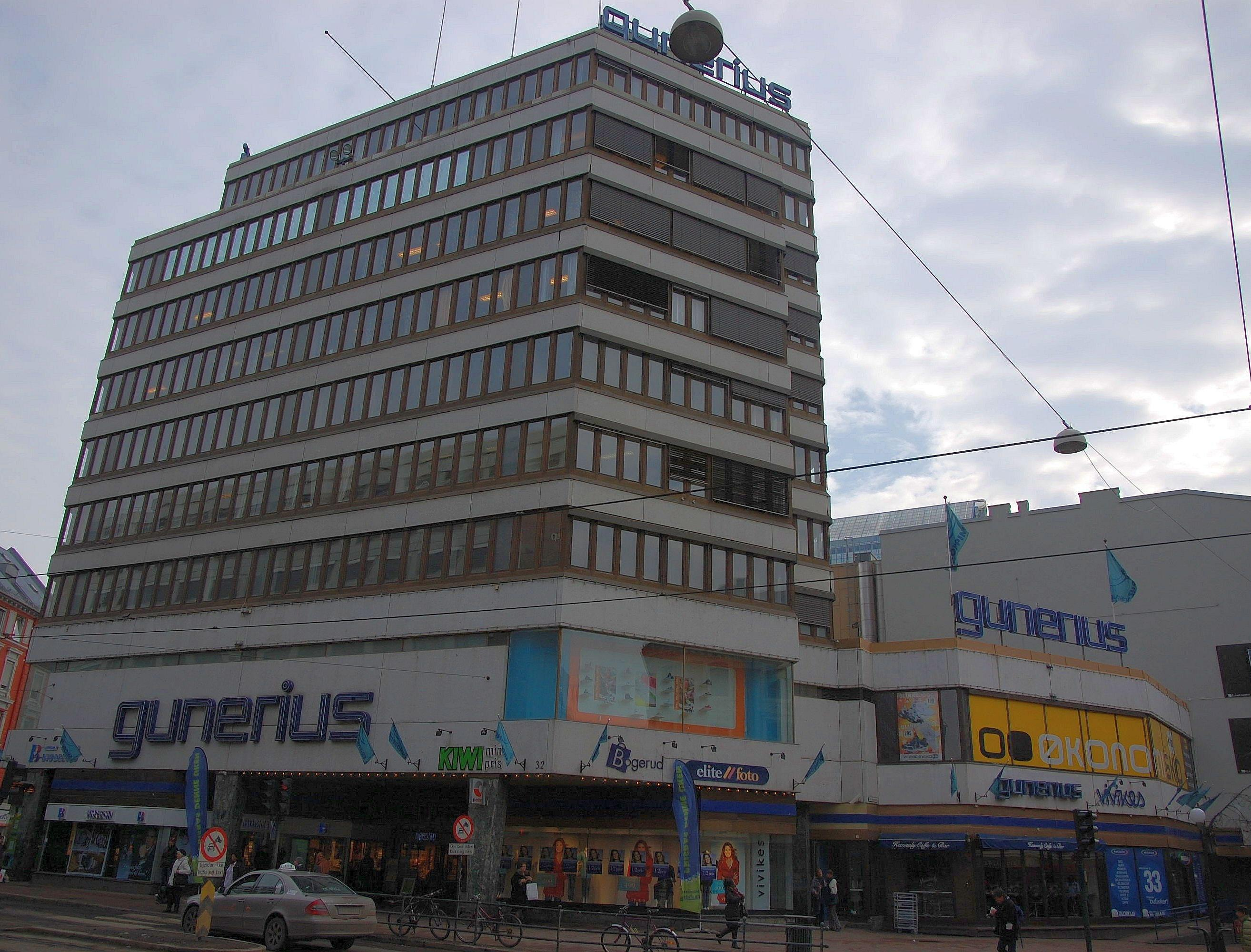
Gunerius Shoppingsenter.

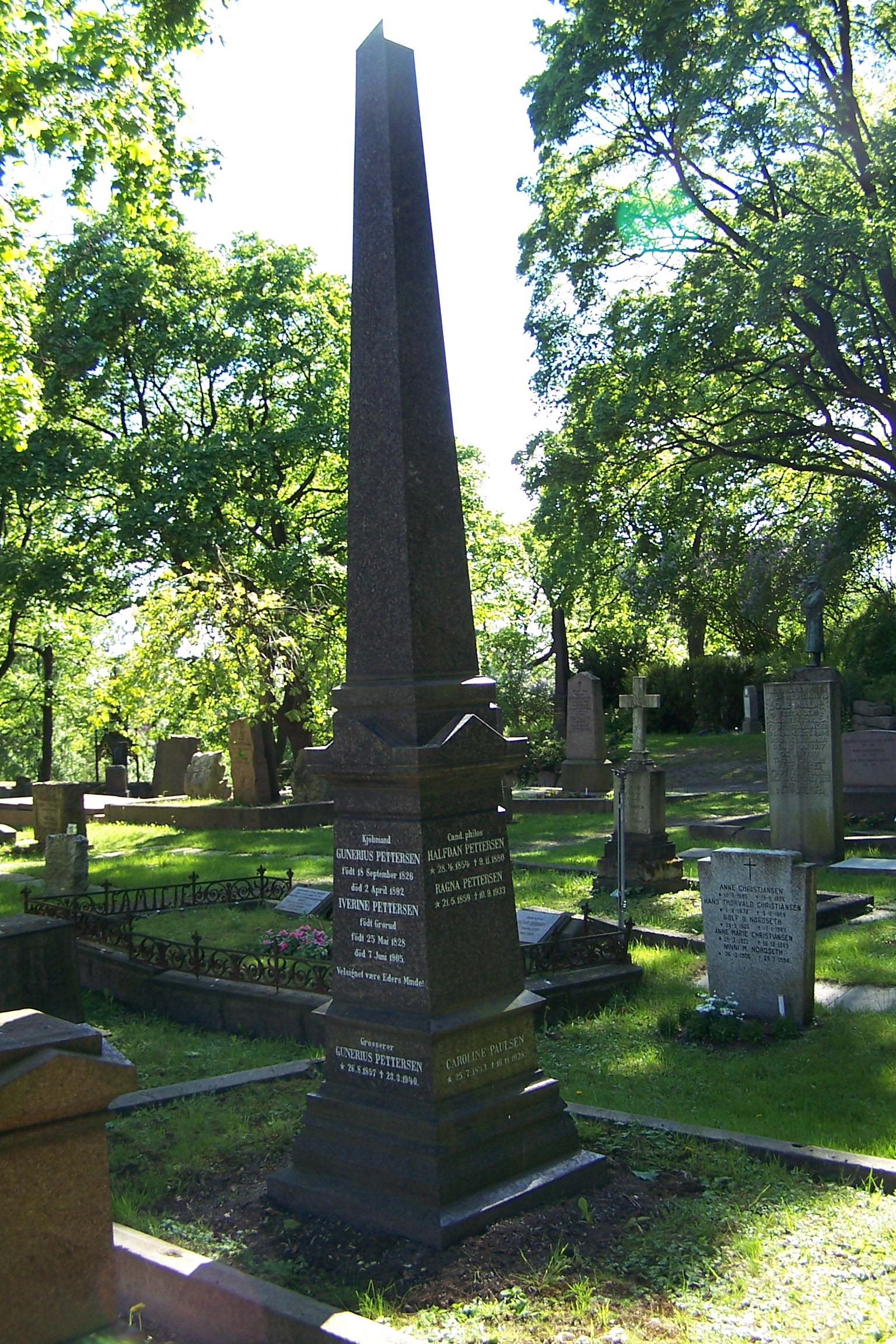
Monument in Vår Frelsers gravlund to Gunerius Pettersen, his wife and several descendants.

Gunerius Pettersen (18 September 1826 – 2 April 1892) was a Norwegian businessperson. He founded the company Gunerius Pettersen, today named Gunerius Shoppingsenter.

He hailed from Drøbak, but moved to Christiania (Oslo) in 1840 to learn the commercial trade. He took apprenticeship at merchant Skappel's shop, and made several advancements there until opening his own business in 1852. He started with an eponymous grocery store, located in Brogaten 8. He also had his residence in a backroom of the store. In 1854, Pettersen bought, and moved his store to a building, Storgaten 34 on the corner of the streets Brogaten and Storgaten. From the start he specialized in serving the travelling farmers who sold goods in the city, but from 1870 he switched to selling dry goods. He also owned a sawmill in Lillestrøm, a farm in Nittedal and was involved in timber trade.

He was married to Iverine, née Grorud (1828–1905). When Gunerius Pettersen died in 1892, his widow took over the company. It was passed down to four of their sons in 1895; Gunerius, Axel, Carl and Harald Pettersen. A fifth son, Hjalmar Pettersen, was a noted librarian and bibliographer. It was a son of Hjalmar, Christian Børs Pettersen, who later took over Gunerius Pettersen's company. Christian Børs Pettersen was joined by a grandson of Axel, another Gunerius as co-owner. The family company still exists in the same location, but the store is now named Gunerius Shoppingsenter.

Another of Gunerius Pettersen's descendants is the champion golfer Suzann Pettersen.
