= Gunerius Shoppingsenter =

Shopping centre in Oslo, Norway

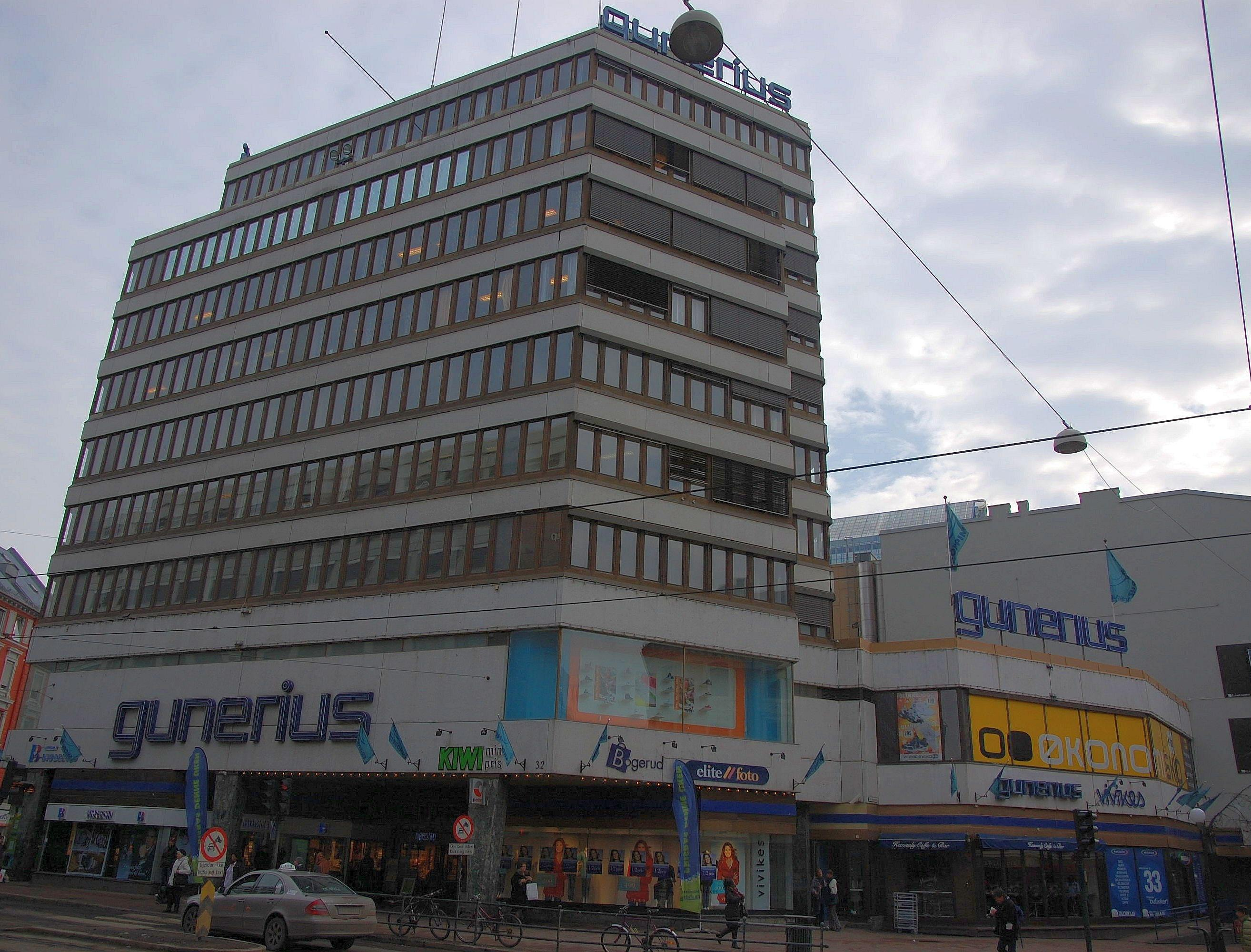
Gunerius Shoppingsenter.

Gunerius Shoppingsenter is one of the largest shopping centres in Oslo, Norway, with c. 18,000 visitors a day – 5,5 million a year. The first shopping centre on this location was opened in 1852 by Gunerius Pettersen. In 1992 it was significantly expanded, and it is now 9,500 m² with c. 30 stores on three floors. Gunerius Shoppingsenter is owned by Olav Thon. The shopping centre is also located at the intersection at Storgata and Lybekkergata. The centre is near Storgata tram (& bus) stop and Hammersborggata regional bus stop.
