= Denmark women's national football team results (2010–2019) =

This article provides details of international football games played by the Denmark women's national football team from 2010 to 2019.

== Results ==
Key
Win
Draw
Defeat

=== 2014 ===
5 March 2014 2014 Algarve Cup	Sweden	2–0	Denmark	Estádio Municipal de Albufeira, Portugal
19:00 WET (UTC)	Asllani 16'; Fischer 18'	Report

=== 2015 ===
12 January 2015 Friendly	Denmark	1–1	New Zealand	Kempinski Hotel Belek, Turkey
13:00 TRT (UTC+3)	Troelsgaard 90'	Report	Longo 40'

15 January 2015 Friendly	Denmark	2–3	New Zealand	Kempinski Hotel Belek, Turkey
9:00 TRT (UTC+3)	Boye 5'; Junge 45'	Report	Percival 9'; Wilkinson 23'; Longo 60'

4 March 2015 2015 Algarve Cup	Japan	1–2	Denmark	Estadio Municipal da Bela Vista, Portugal
15:10 WET (UTC)	Ando 15'	Report	Troelsgaard 2'; Rasmussen 60'

6 March 2015 2015 Algarve Cup	France	4–1	Denmark	Estádio Algarve, Portugal
16:00 WET (UTC)	Abily 2'; Le Sommer 6'; Dali 16'; Lavogez 43'	Report	Troelsgaard 76'

9 March 2015 2015 Algarve Cup	Portugal	2–2	Denmark	Estadio Municipal da Bela Vista, Portugal
15:10 WET (UTC)	Silva 76'; Neto 86'	Report	Troelsgaard 52'; Rask 70'

11 March 2015 2015 Algarve Cup	Norway	5–2	Denmark	Estádio Municipal de Albufeira, Portugal
19:00 WET (UTC)	Gulbrandsen 7', 34', 43'; Moe Wold 65'; Bjånesøy 71'	Report	Harder 60', 78'

8 April 2015 Friendly	Sweden	3–3	Denmark	Tele2 Arena, Sweden
17:30 CEST (UTC+2)	Schelin 30', 62'; Seger 67'	Report	Petersson 53'; Troelsgaard 56'; Harder 90' (pen.)

17 September 2015 Friendly	Romania	0–2	Denmark	Centrul De Fotbal Mogoşoaia, Romania
16:00 EEST (UTC+3)		Report	Kildemoes 71'; Troelsgaard 74'

22 September 2015 Friendly	Switzerland	4–1	Denmark	Tissot Arena, Switzerland
18:30 CEST (UTC+2)	Crnogorcevic 7', 82'; Bachmann 36'	Report	Boye 11' (o.g.); Larsen 49'

22 October 2015 2017 UEFA Euros qualifying	Denmark	4–0	Moldova	Viborg Stadium, Danmark
19:00 CEST (UTC+2)	Troelsgaard 24'; Harder 35'; Nadia Nadim 52', 89'	Report

27 October 2015 2017 UEFA Euros qualifying	Sweden	1–0	Denmark	Gamla Ullevi, Sweden
18:45 CEST (UTC+2)	Caroline Seger 59'	Report

26 November 2015 2017 UEFA Euros qualifying	Slovakia	0–1	Denmark	NTC Senec, Slovakia
19:00 CEST (UTC+2)		Report	Troelsgaard 34'

=== 2016 ===
22 January 2016 Friendly	Denmark	0–2	Netherlands	Belek, Turkey
13:30 TRT (UTC+3)		Report	Martens 70'; van de Sanden 94'	Stadium: Arcardia Belek; Attendance: 63; Referee: Melis Özçiğdem (Turkey)

25 January 2016 Friendly	Denmark	1–2	Netherlands	Belek, Turkey
09:00 TRT (UTC+3)	Troelsgaard 88'	Report	Miedema 44'; van de Donk 92'	Stadium: Arcardia Belek; Attendance: 25; Referee: Neslihan Muratdağı (Turkey)

2 March 2016 2016 Algarve Cup	Canada	0–1	Denmark	Albufeira, Portugal
16:00 WET (UTC)		Report	Nadim 55'	Stadium: Estádio Municipal de Albufeira; Attendance: 0 Referee: Olga Miranda, Paraguay

4 March 2016 2016 Algarve Cup	Denmark	1–4	Iceland	Parchal, Portugal
16:00 WET (UTC)	Nadim 53'	Report	Þorvaldsdóttir 11'; Omirsdottir 12'; Magnúsdóttir 56', 90'	Stadium: Estadio Municipal da Bela Vista; Attendance: 0 Referee: Tupou Patia, Cook Islands

7 March 2016 2016 Algarve Cup	Denmark	1–2	Belgium	Albufeira, Portugal
17:30 WET (UTC)	Boye 43' (o.g); Sandvej 93'	Report	Cayman 86'	Stadium: Estádio Municipal de Albufeira; Attendance: 0 Referee: Aye Thein, Burma

9 March 2016 2016 Algarve Cup	Denmark	3–1	Portugal	Parchal, Portugal
16:00 WET (UTC)	Troelsgaard 4', 11'; Rasmussen 81'	Report	Silva 73'	Stadium: Estadio Municipal da Bela Vista; Attendance: 0 Referee: Tupou Patia, Cook Islands

7 April 2016 2017 UEFA Women's EQ	Poland	0–0	Denmark	Tychy, Poland
20:00 CEST (UTC+2)		Report		Stadium: Stadium Miejski; Attendance: 5438; Referee: Sandra Braz Bastos, Portugal

2 June 2016 2017 UEFA Women's EQ	Denmark	4–0	Slovakia	Viborg, Denmark
19:00 CEST (UTC+2)	Harder 28'; Nadim 49', 60' (pen.); Troelsgaard 90+2'	Report		Stadium: Viborg Stadium; Attendance: 3412; Referee: Carina Vitulano, Italy

7 June 2016 2017 UEFA Women's EQ	Denmark	6–0	Poland	Viborg, Denmark
19:00 CEST (UTC+2)	Troelsgaard 18', 27', 62'; Harder 24', 41'; Rasmussen 53'	Report		Stadium: Viborg Stadium; Attendance: 4611

15 September 2016 2017 UEFA Women's EQ	Moldova	0–5	Denmark	Chișinău, Moldova
20:00 EEST (UTC+3)		Report	Nadim 3', 68'; Harder 18', 33', 74'	Stadium: Stadionul Zimbru; Attendance: 980; Referee: Eleni Antoniou

20 September 2016 2017 UEFA Women's EQ	Denmark	2–0	Sweden	Viborg, Denmark
19:00 CEST (UTC+2)	Rasmussen 12'; Nadim 47'	Report		Stadium: Viborg Stadium; Attendance: 7432

20 October 2016 Friendly	Denmark	2–1	Uzbekistan	Yongchuan, China
10:00 CST (UTC+8)	Troelsgaard 42'; S. Larsen 91'	Report	Narbekova 10'	Stadium: Yongchuan Stadium; Attendance: 3520; Referee: Xiaohu Hei, China

22 October 2016 Friendly	Denmark	1–0	Iceland	Yongchuan, China
13:30 CST (UTC+8)	Rasmussen 39'	Report		Stadium: Yongchuan Stadium; Attendance: 10100

24 October 2016 Friendly	China	1–0	Denmark	Yongchuan, China
13:35 CST (UTC+8)	Ren Guixin 48'	Report		Stadium: Yongchuan Stadium; Attendance: 7670; Referee: Qin Liang, China

28 November 2016 Friendly	Belgium	1–3	Denmark	Tubize, Belgium
20:00 CEST (UTC+2)	Vanmechelen 62'	Report	Boye 19'; Harder 61', 71'	Stadium: Stade Leburton; Attendance: 750; Referee: Vivian Peeters, Netherlands

=== 2017 ===
20 January 2017 Friendly	Denmark	2–2	Scotland	Larnaca, Cyprus
	Harder 6'; Rasmussen 31'	Report	Ross 21'; Cuthbert 71'	Stadium: GSZ Stadium; Attendance: 42; Referee: Neofytos Neofytou (Cyprus)

23 January 2017 Friendly	Scotland	1–1	Denmark	Paralimni, Cyprus
	Brown 4' (o.g.)	Report	Little 75'	Stadium: Paralimni "Tasos Markou" Stadium; Attendance: 20; Referee: Leontios Trattou (Cyprus)

1 March 2017 2017 Algarve Cup	Denmark	0–1	Canada	Lagos, Portugal
		Report	Sinclair 90'	Stadium: Lagos Municipal Stadium; Attendance: 477

3 March 2017 2017 Algarve Cup	Portugal	0–6	Denmark	Parchal, Portugal
		Report	Larsen 11', 32'; Jensen 9'; Troelsgaard 25', 68'; Veje 59'	Stadium: Bela Vista Municipal Stadium; Attendance: 362; Referee: Yoshimi Yamashita (Japan)

6 March 2017 2017 Algarve Cup	Russia	1–6	Denmark	Vila Real de Santo António, Portugal
	Chernomyrdina 45+3'	Report	Harder 25' (pen.), 59', 72'; Sørensen 70'; Dyrehauge Hansen 82', 89'	Stadium: VRS António Sports Complex; Attendance: 162; Referee: Casey Reibelt (Australia)

8 March 2017 2017 Algarve Cup	Australia	1–1 (1–4 p)	Denmark	Albufeira, Portugal
	K. Simon 36'	Report	Harder 80'	Stadium: Albufeira Municipal Stadium; Attendance: 200
	Penalties
	Kellond-Knight (penalty scored); Polkinghorne (penalty missed); Kerr (penalty missed)		(penalty scored) Røddik Hansen; (penalty scored) Petersen; (penalty scored) Larsen; (penalty scored) Troelsgaard

11 April 2017 Friendly	Denmark	5–0	Finland	Slagelse, Denmark
	Harder 6'; Troelsgaard 20'; Auvinen 39' (o.g.); Larsen 42', 59'	Report		Stadium: Harboe Arena Slagelse; Attendance: 3.312; Referee: Henrikke Nervik (Norway)

1 July 2017 Friendly	Denmark	1–2	England	Gladsaxe, Denmark
	Harder 66'	Report	White 44', 76'	Stadium: Gladsaxe Stadium; Attendance: 2.934; Referee: Sara Persson (Sweden)

6 July 2017 Friendly	Austria	4–2	Denmark	Wiener Neustadt, Austria
	Billa 1', 49'; Zadrazil 55', 63'	Report	Veje 22'; Larsen 88'	Stadium: Wiener Neustadt Stadium; Attendance: 1.250; Referee: Lucie Sulcova (Czech Republic)

16 July 2017 UEFA Women's Euro – GS	Denmark	1–0	Belgium	Doetinchem, Netherlands
	Troelsgaard 6'	Report		Stadium: De Vijverberg; Attendance: 4.565; Referee: Kateryna Monzul (Ukraine)

20 July 2017 UEFA Women's Euro – GS	Netherlands	1–0	Denmark	Rotterdam, Netherlands
	Spitse 20' (pen.)	Report		Stadium: Sparta Stadion Het Kasteel; Attendance: 10.078; Referee: Riem Hussein (Germany)

24 July 2017 UEFA Women's Euro – GS	Norway	0–1	Denmark	Deventer, Netherlands
		Report	Veje 5'	Stadium: De Adelaarshorst; Attendance: 5.885; Referee: Stéphanie Frappart (France)

30 July 2017 UEFA Women's Euro – QF	Germany	1–2	Denmark	Rotterdam, Netherlands
	Kerschowski 5'	Report	Nadim 48'; Nielsen 83'	Stadium: Sparta Stadion Het Kasteel; Attendance: 5.251; Referee: Katalin Kulcsár (Hungary)

3 August 2017 UEFA Women's Euro – SF	Denmark	0–0 (3–0 p)	Austria	Breda, Netherlands
		Report		Stadium: Rat Verlegh Stadion; Attendance: 10.184; Referee: Kateryna Monzul (Ukraine)
	Penalties
	Nadim (penalty scored); Harder (penalty scored); Junge (penalty missed); Boye (penalty scored)		(penalty missed) Feiersinger; (penalty missed) Pinther; (penalty missed) Aschauer

6 August 2017 UEFA Women's Euro Final	Netherlands	4–2	Denmark	Enschede, Netherlands
	Miedema 10', 89'; Martens 27'; Spitse 51'		Nadim 6' (pen.); Harder 33'	Stadium: De Grolsch Veste; Attendance: 28.182; Referee: Esther Staubli (Switzerland)

19 September 2017 2019 World Cup qualification	Hungary	1–6	Denmark	Győr, Hungary
	Jakabfi 41' (pen.)	Report	Nadim 28' (pen.); Troelsgaard 44', 67', 74'; Harder 55'; Sørensen 88'	Stadium: Gyirmóti Stadion; Referee: Ewa Augustyn (Poland)

20 October 2017 2019 World Cup qualification	Sweden	3–0; Awarded (Note: The Sweden v Denmark match was scheduled for 20 October 2017, 18:15 local time, at Gamla Ullevi, Gothenburg, but was cancelled by Denmark because of a pay dispute between the Danish team and their federation. UEFA opened disciplinary proceedings against Denmark for refusal to play and, on 16 November, it was announced that UEFA awarded the match to Sweden by a score of 3–0, and fined Denmark €20,000.)	Denmark	Gothenburg, Sweden
				Stadium: Gamla Ullevi

24 October 2017 2019 World Cup qualification	Croatia	0–4	Denmark	Zagreb, Croatia
		Report	Harder 7', 27'; Christiansen 89'; Bruun 90+4'	Stadium: Stadion ŠRC Zaprešić; Attendance: 400; Referee: Lorraine Clark (Scotland)

=== 2018 ===
21 January 2018 Friendly	United States	5–1	Denmark	San Diego, California
19:30 ET	Morgan 17'; Ertz 19'; Pugh 47', 65'; Dunn 81'	Report	Nadim 14'	Stadium: SDCCU Stadium; Attendance: 17,526; Referee: Karen Abt (United States)

28 February 2018 2018 Algarve Cup	Denmark	0–0	Iceland	Lagos, Portugal
19:30 CET		Report		Stadium: Lagos Municipal Stadium

2 March 2018 2018 Algarve Cup	Denmark	2–3	Netherlands	Vila Real de Santo António, Portugal
19:30 CET	Harder 19'; Thøgersen 35'	Report	van den Goorbergh 31'; Martens 78'; Boye 90+4' (o.g.)	Stadium: VRS António Sports Complex; Referee: Casey Reibelt (Australia)

5 March 2018 2018 Algarve Cup	Japan	2–0	Denmark	Algarve, Portugal
16:40 CET	Hasegawa 82'; Iwabuchi 90+3' (pen.)	Report		Stadium: Estádio Algarve; Referee: Ledya Tafesse (Ethiopia)

7 March 2018 2018 Algarve Cup	Iceland	1–1 (5–4 p)	Denmark	Algarve, Portugal
19:30 CET	Eiríksdóttir 70'	Report	Troelsgaard Nielsen 62'	Stadium: VRS António Sports Complex, Vila Real de Santo António; Referee: Salima Mukansanga (Rwanda)
	Penalties
	Sigurðardóttir (penalty scored); Hönnudóttir (penalty scored); Kristjánsdóttir (penalty scored); Albertsdóttir (penalty scored); Hauksdóttir (penalty scored)		(penalty scored) Christiansen; (penalty scored) Troelsgaard; (penalty missed) Holmgaard; (penalty scored) Sørensen; (penalty scored) Arnth

9 April 2018 2019 World Cup qualification	Denmark	1–0	Ukraine	Viborg, Denmark
18:00	Troelsgaard 79'	Report		Stadium: Viborg Stadium; Referee: Jana Adámková (Czech Republic)

8 June 2018 2019 World Cup qualification	Ukraine	1–5	Denmark	Lviv, Ukraine
	Ovdiychuk 90+3'	Report	Nadim 6', 52'; Harder 33'; Troelsgaard 81', 90+5'	Stadium: Arena Lviv; Referee: Carina Vitulano (Italy)

12 June 2018 2019 World Cup qualification	Denmark	5–1	Hungary	Viborg, Denmark
18:00	Nadim 44', 45+1'; Boye 47'; Nielsen 57'; Harder 90+4'	Report	Jakabfi 24'	Stadium: Viborg Stadium; Attendance: 7,028; Referee: Rebecca Welch (England)

30 August 2018 2019 World Cup qualification	Denmark	1–1	Croatia	Viborg, Denmark
19:00	Nadim 90+2'	Report	Lojna 60'	Stadium: Viborg Stadium; Attendance: 7,045; Referee: Volha Tsiareshka (Belarus)

4 September 2018 2019 World Cup qualification	Denmark	0–1	Sweden	Viborg Stadium, Viborg
17:00			Jakobsson 46'	Referee: Anastasia Pustovoitova (Russia)

5 October 2018 2019 FIFA World Cup qualifier – Play-off SF	Netherlands	2–0	Denmark	Rat Verlegh Stadion, Breda
20:00	Beerensteyn 21'; Van de Sanden 42'	Report		Attendance: 19000; Referee: Kateryna Monzul (Ukraine)

9 October 2018 2019 FIFA World Cup qualifier – Play-off SF	Denmark	1–2	Netherlands	Viborg Stadium, Viborg
18:00	Nadim 5' (P)	Report	Beerensteyn 7, 90+2'	Referee: Sara Persson (Sweden)

=== 2019 ===
21 January 2019 Friendly	Denmark	1–0	Finland	Larnaca, Cyprus
14:00 CET	Gejl 73'	Report		Stadium: GSZ Stadium; Attendance: 30; Referee: Ioanna Allayiotou (Cyprus)

27 February 2019 2019 Algarve Cup	Norway	2–1	Denmark	Algarve, Portugal
14:15 CET	Nadim 18'	Report	Åsland 77'; Utland 92'	Stadium: Estádio Algarve; Attendance: 50; Referee: Kate Jacewicz (Australia)

4 March 2019 2019 Algarve Cup	Denmark	1–0	China	Vila Real de Santo António, Portugal
14:15 CET	Harder 60' (pen.)	Report		Stadium: VRS António Sports Complex; Attendance: 70

6 March 2019 2019 Algarve Cup	Scotland	1–0	Denmark	Algarve, Portugal
14:15 CET	Ross 35'	Report		Stadium: Estádio Algarve; Attendance: 50

8 April 2019 Friendly	France	4–0	Denmark	Strasbourg, France
21:00 CET	Cascarino 31', 47'; Mbock Bathy 54'; Gauvin 66'	Report		Stadium: Stade de la Meinau; Attendance: 15,874; Referee: Ivana Martinčić (Croatia)

25 May 2019 Friendly	England	2–0	Denmark	Walsall, England
16:00 CET	Parris 45+1'; Scott 59'	Report		Stadium: Bescot Stadium; Attendance: 8,273; Referee: Desiree Grundbacher (Switzerland)

29 August 2019 2021 UEFA Women's EQ	Denmark	8–0	Malta	Viborg, Denmark
18:00 CET	Troelsgaard 5', 45+2'; Harder 19'; Sevecke 28'; Larsen 58', 90+2'; Gejl 75'; Sørensen 86'	Report		Stadium: Viborg Stadium; Attendance: 3,890; Referee: Angelika Söder (Germany)

3 September 2019 2021 UEFA Women's EQ	Israel	0–3	Denmark	Ramat Gan, Israel
18:00 CET		Report	Barkai 13' (o.g.); Nadim 80'; Harder 84'	Stadium: Ramat Gan Stadium; Attendance: 1,070; Referee: Sandra Strub (Switzerland)

4 October 2019 2021 UEFA Women's EQ	Denmark	2–0	Bosnia and Herzegovina	Viborg, Denmark
17:00 CET	St. Pedersen 13'; Troelsgaard 68'	Report		Stadium: Viborg Stadium; Attendance: 4,552; Referee: Monika Mularczyk (Poland)

8 October 2019 2021 UEFA Women's EQ	Georgia	0–2	Denmark	Tbilisi, Georgia
18:00 CET		Report	Gejl 14'; Sørensen 58'	Stadium: Mikheil Meskhi Stadium; Attendance: 287; Referee: Reelika Turi (Estonia)

12 November 2019 2021 UEFA Women's EQ	Denmark	14–0	Georgia	Viborg, Denmark
18:00 CET	Nadim 4', 26', 36'; Larsen 16', 19', 53'; Sørensen 27', 39'; Svava 28'; Harder 34', 45', 73'; Christiansen 82'; Madsen 90+1'	Report		Stadium: Viborg Stadium; Attendance: 3,085; Referee: Silvia Domingos (Portugal)

== Head-to-head records ==
2015—2019 statistics.

Head to head records
Opponent	P	W	D	L	GF	GA	W%	D%	L%
Australia	1	1	0	0	5	2	100	0	0
Austria	2	1	0	1	5	4	50	0	50
Belgium	3	2	0	1	5	3	66.67	0	33.33
Bosnia and Herzegovina	1	1	0	0	2	0	100	0	0
Canada	2	1	0	1	1	1	50	0	50
China	2	1	0	1	1	1	50	0	50
Croatia	2	1	1	0	5	1	50	50	0
England	2	0	0	2	1	4	100	0	0
Finland	2	2	0	0	6	0	100	0	0
France	2	0	0	2	1	8	0	0	100
Georgia	2	2	0	0	16	0	100	0	0
Germany	1	1	0	0	2	1	100	0	0
Hungary	2	2	0	0	11	2	100	0	0
Iceland	4	1	1	2	7	10	25	25	50
Israel	1	1	0	0	3	0	100	0	0
Japan	2	1	0	1	2	3	50	0	50
Malta	1	1	0	0	8	0	100	0	0
Moldova	2	2	0	0	9	0	100	0	0
Netherlands	7	0	0	7	6	16	0	0	100
New Zealand	2	0	1	1	3	4	0	50	50
Norway	3	1	0	2	4	7	33.33	0	66.67
Poland	2	1	1	0	6	0	50	50	0
Portugal	3	2	1	0	11	3	66.67	33.33	0
Romania	1	1	0	0	2	0	100	0	0
Russia	1	1	0	0	6	1	100	0	0
Scotland	3	0	2	1	3	4	0	66.67	33.33
Slovakia	2	2	0	0	5	0	100	0	0
Sweden	5	1	1	3	5	10	20	20	60
Switzerland	1	0	0	1	1	4	0	0	100
Ukraine	2	2	0	0	6	1	100	0	0
United States	1	0	0	1	1	5	0	0	100
Uzbekistan	1	1	0	0	2	1	100	0	0
Totals	67	33	8	28	151	96	49.25	11.94	41.79

=== FIFA Top 20 ===
2015—2019 statistics. The statistics include any team that has placed in the FIFA top 20 ranking, from 19 December 2014 to 13 December 2019.

Head to head records
Opponent	P	W	D	L	GF	GA	W%	D%	L%
Australia	1	1	0	0	5	2	100	0	0
Austria	2	1	0	1	5	4	50	0	50
Belgium	3	2	0	1	5	3	66.67	0	33.33
Canada	2	1	0	1	1	1	50	0	50
China	2	1	0	1	1	1	50	0	50
England	2	0	0	2	1	4	100	0	0
France	2	0	0	2	1	8	0	0	100
Germany	1	1	0	0	2	1	100	0	0
Iceland	4	1	1	2	7	10	25	25	50
Japan	2	1	0	1	2	3	50	0	50
Netherlands	7	0	0	7	6	16	0	0	100
New Zealand	2	0	1	1	3	4	0	50	50
Norway	3	1	0	2	4	7	33.33	0	66.67
Scotland	3	0	2	1	3	4	0	66.67	33.33
Sweden	5	1	1	3	5	10	20	20	60
Switzerland	1	0	0	1	1	4	0	0	100
United States	1	0	0	1	1	5	0	0	100
Totals	43	11	5	27	53	87	25.58	11.63	62.79
