= 2019–20 in Italian football =

Football in Italy
- Season: 2019–20

Men's football
- Serie A: Juventus
- Serie B: Benevento
- Serie C: Monza; Vicenza; Reggina
- Serie D: not awarded
- Coppa Italia: Napoli
- Supercoppa Italiana: Lazio

Women's football
- Serie A: Juventus

The 2019–20 season was the 118th season of competitive football in Italy. On 9 March 2020, the Italian government halted all sports events in Italy until 3 April 2020 due to the coronavirus pandemic in Italy. On 18 May, it was announced that Italian football would be suspended until 14 June. On 28 May, it was announced that Serie A and Serie B would resume starting 20 June. Serie C and Serie D, however, did not resume with table leaders announced as champions in Serie C, and no winners announced.

== Promotions and relegations (pre-season) ==
Teams promoted to Serie A

- Brescia
- Lecce
- Hellas Verona

Teams relegated from Serie A

- Chievo
- Frosinone
- Empoli

Teams promoted to Serie B

- Virtus Entella
- Pordenone
- Juve Stabia
- Pisa
- Trapani

Teams relegated from Serie B

- Padova
- Carpi
- Foggia
- Palermo (to Serie D)

== National teams ==
=== Men ===
==== Italy national football team ====
===== Friendlies =====
TBD	Italy	v	San Marino	Cagliari, Italy
		Report		Stadium: Sardegna Arena
Note: The match was originally scheduled for 29 May 2020, but was postponed on 1 April 2020, to a date to be determined due to the coronavirus pandemic.

TBD	England	v	Italy	London, England
		Report		Stadium: Wembley Stadium
Note: The match was originally scheduled for 27 March 2020, but was cancelled on 13 March 2020 due to the coronavirus pandemic. The match was later rescheduled to be played in June, but was postponed on 1 April 2020, to a date to be determined.

TBD	Germany	v	Italy	Nuremberg, Germany
		Report		Stadium: Max-Morlock-Stadion; Referee: Andris Treimanis (Latvia)
Note: The match was originally scheduled for 31 March 2020, but was cancelled on 13 March 2020 due to the coronavirus pandemic. The match was later rescheduled to be played in June, but was postponed on 1 April 2020, to a date to be determined.

TBD	Italy	v	Czech Republic	Bologna, Italy
		Report		Stadium: Stadio Renato Dall'Ara
Note: The match was originally scheduled for 4 June 2020, but was postponed on 1 April 2020, to a date to be determined due to the coronavirus pandemic.

===== UEFA Euro 2020 qualifying =====
====== Group J ======
Pos	Team	Pld	W	D	L	GF	GA	GD	Pts	Qualification	(Italy)	(Finland)	(Greece)	(Bosnia and Herzegovina)	(Armenia)	(Liechtenstein)
1	Italy	10	10	0	0	37	4	+33	30	Qualify for final tournament	—	2–0	2–0	2–1	9–1	6–0
2	Finland	10	6	0	4	16	10	+6	18	Qualify for final tournament	1–2	—	1–0	2–0	3–0	3–0
3	Greece	10	4	2	4	12	14	−2	14		0–3	2–1	—	2–1	2–3	1–1
4	Bosnia and Herzegovina	10	4	1	5	20	17	+3	13	Advance to play-offs via Nations League	0–3	4–1	2–2	—	2–1	5–0
5	Armenia	10	3	1	6	14	25	−11	10		1–3	0–2	0–1	4–2	—	3–0
6	Liechtenstein	10	0	2	8	2	31	−29	2		0–5	0–2	0–2	0–3	1–1	—

Source: UEFA
Rules for classification: Qualification tiebreakers

5 September 2019	Armenia	1–3	Italy	Yerevan, Armenia
18:00 (20:00 UTC+4)	Karapetian 11'	Report	Belotti 28'; Lo. Pellegrini 77'; Ayrapetyan 80' (o.g.)	Stadium: Vazgen Sargsyan Republican Stadium; Attendance: 13,680; Referee: Daniel Siebert (Germany)

8 September 2019	Finland	1–2	Italy	Tampere, Finland
20:45 (21:45 UTC+3)	Pukki 72' (pen.)	Report	Immobile 59'; Jorginho 79' (pen.)	Stadium: Tampere Stadium; Attendance: 16,292; Referee: Bobby Madden (Scotland)

12 October 2019	Italy	2–0	Greece	Rome, Italy
20:45	Jorginho 63' (pen.); Bernardeschi 78'	Report		Stadium: Stadio Olimpico; Attendance: 56,274; Referee: Sergei Karasev (Russia)

15 October 2019	Liechtenstein	0–5	Italy	Vaduz, Liechtenstein
20:45		Report	Bernardeschi 2'; Belotti 70', 90+2'; Romagnoli 77'; El Shaarawy 82'	Stadium: Rheinpark Stadion; Attendance: 5,087; Referee: Andris Treimanis (Latvia)

15 November 2019	Bosnia and Herzegovina	0–3	Italy	Zenica, Bosnia and Herzegovina
20:45		Report	Acerbi 21'; Insigne 37'; Belotti 52'	Stadium: Bilino Polje; Attendance: 8,355; Referee: Sandro Schärer (Switzerland)

18 November 2019	Italy	9–1	Armenia	Palermo, Italy
20:45	Immobile 8', 33'; Zaniolo 9', 64'; Barella 29'; Romagnoli 72'; Jorginho 75' (pen.); Orsolini 78'; Chiesa 81'	Report	Babayan 79'	Stadium: Stadio Renzo Barbera; Attendance: 27,800; Referee: Tiago Martins (Portugal)

==== UEFA Euro 2020 ====
On 17 March 2020, UEFA confirmed that UEFA Euro 2020 had been postponed by one year in response to the COVID-19 pandemic in Europe.

=== Women ===
==== UEFA Women's Euro 2021 qualifying ====
===== Group B =====
Pos	Team	Pld	W	D	L	GF	GA	GD	Pts	Qualification	Denmark	Italy	Bosnia and Herzegovina	Malta	Israel	Georgia
1	Denmark	10	9	1	0	48	1	+47	28	Final tournament	—	0–0	2–0	8–0	4–0	14–0
2	Italy	10	8	1	1	37	5	+32	25	Final tournament	1–3	—	2–0	5–0	12–0	6–0
3	Bosnia and Herzegovina	10	6	0	4	19	17	+2	18		0–4	0–5	—	2–0	1–0	7–1
4	Malta	10	3	1	6	11	30	−19	10		0–8	0–2	2–3	—	1–1	2–1
5	Israel	10	2	1	7	10	30	−20	7		0–3	2–3	1–3	0–2	—	4–0
6	Georgia	10	0	0	10	3	45	−42	0		0–2	0–1	0–3	0–4	1–2	—

Source: UEFA
Rules for classification: Tiebreakers

29 August 2019	Israel	2–3	Italy	Ramat Gan, Israel
17:30 (18:30 IDT)	Goor 32'; Awad 90+1'	Report	Girelli 45+2'; Bartoli 64'; Giacinti 71'	Stadium: Ramat Gan Stadium; Attendance: 1,430; Referee: Volha Tsiareshka (Belarus)

3 September 2019	Georgia	0–1	Italy	Tbilisi, Georgia
14:15 (16:15 GET)		Report	Girelli 24'	Stadium: Mikheil Meskhi Stadium; Attendance: 150; Referee: Vivian Peeters (Netherlands)

4 October 2019	Malta	0–2	Italy	Ta' Qali, Malta
17:30		Report	Bartoli 69'; Girelli 90+2' (pen.)	Stadium: Centenary Stadium; Attendance: 764; Referee: Ivana Projkovska (North Macedonia)

8 October 2019	Italy	2–0	Bosnia and Herzegovina	Palermo, Italy
17:30	Girelli 3'; Giugliano 28'	Report		Stadium: Stadio Renzo Barbera; Attendance: 5,100; Referee: Hristiyana Guteva (Bulgaria)

8 November 2019	Italy	6–0	Georgia	Benevento, Italy
17:30	Linari 10'; Guagni 25'; Girelli 27'; Sabatino 32', 45+1'; Rosucci 52'	Report		Stadium: Stadio Ciro Vigorito; Attendance: 3,973; Referee: Iuliana Demetrescu (Romania)

12 November 2019	Italy	5–0	Malta	Castel di Sangro, Italy
14:15	Cernoia 27', 37'; Sabatino 42'; Giugliano 45'; Greggi 90+3'	Report		Stadium: Stadio Teofilo Patini; Attendance: 2,955; Referee: Eleni Antoniou (Greece)

==== 2020 Algarve Cup ====
4 March 2020	Portugal	1–2	Italy	Faro/Loulé, Portugal
	Silva 34'	Report	Linari 75'; Girelli 90+4'	Stadium: Estádio Algarve; Referee: Francia González (Mexico)

7 March 2020 SF	New Zealand	0–3	Italy	Parchal, Portugal
		Report	Girelli 20'; Bonansea 56'; Bartoli 68'	Stadium: Vista Municipal Stadium; Referee: Ivana Martinčić (Croatia)

11 March 2020 F	Italy	Cancelled	Germany	Parchal, Portugal
		Report		Stadium: Vista Municipal Stadium

== League season ==
=== Men ===
==== Serie A ====
Pos	Team	Pld	W	D	L	GF	GA	GD	Pts	Qualification or relegation
1	Juventus (C)	38	26	5	7	76	43	+33	83	Qualification for the Champions League group stage
2	Internazionale	38	24	10	4	81	36	+45	82	Qualification for the Champions League group stage
3	Atalanta	38	23	9	6	98	48	+50	78 (Note: Atalanta finished ahead of Lazio on head-to-head points: Lazio 3–3 Atalanta, Atalanta 3–2 Lazio.)	Qualification for the Champions League group stage
4	Lazio	38	24	6	8	79	42	+37	78	Qualification for the Champions League group stage
5	Roma	38	21	7	10	77	51	+26	70	Qualification for the Europa League group stage
6	Milan	38	19	9	10	63	46	+17	66	Qualification for the Europa League second qualifying round
7	Napoli	38	18	8	12	61	50	+11	62	Qualification for the Europa League group stage (Note: Napoli qualified for the Europa League group stage by winning the 2019–20 Coppa Italia.)
8	Sassuolo	38	14	9	15	69	63	+6	51	
9	Hellas Verona	38	12	13	13	47	51	−4	49 (Note: Positions determined by head-to-head points: Hellas Verona: 10 pts; Fiorentina: 5 pts; Parma: 1 pt.)	
10	Fiorentina	38	12	13	13	51	48	+3	49	
11	Parma	38	14	7	17	56	57	−1	49	
12	Bologna	38	12	11	15	52	65	−13	47	
13	Udinese	38	12	9	17	37	51	−14	45 (Note: Udinese finished ahead of Cagliari on head-to-head points: Udinese 2–1 Cagliari, Cagliari 0–1 Udinese.)	
14	Cagliari	38	11	12	15	52	56	−4	45	
15	Sampdoria	38	12	6	20	48	65	−17	42	
16	Torino	38	11	7	20	46	68	−22	40	
17	Genoa	38	10	9	19	47	73	−26	39	
18	Lecce (R)	38	9	8	21	52	85	−33	35	Relegation to Serie B
19	Brescia (R)	38	6	7	25	35	79	−44	25	Relegation to Serie B
20	SPAL (R)	38	5	5	28	27	77	−50	20	Relegation to Serie B

Source: Serie A, Soccerway
Rules for classification: 1) Points; 2) Head-to-head points; 3) Head-to-head goal difference; 4) Goal difference; 5) Goals scored; 6) Draw. (Note: Head-to-head record is used only after all the matches between the teams in question have been played)
(C) Champions; (R) Relegated

==== Serie B ====
Pos	Team	Pld	W	D	L	GF	GA	GD	Pts	Promotion, qualification or relegation
1	Benevento (C, P)	38	26	8	4	67	27	+40	86	Promotion to Serie A
2	Crotone (P)	38	20	8	10	63	40	+23	68	Promotion to Serie A
3	Spezia (O, P)	38	17	10	11	54	40	+14	61	Qualification for promotion play-offs semi-finals
4	Pordenone	38	16	10	12	48	46	+2	58 (Note: Pordenone finished ahead of Cittadella on head-to-head points: Pordenone 0–0 Cittadella, Cittadella 0–2 Pordenone.)	Qualification for promotion play-offs semi-finals
5	Cittadella	38	17	7	14	49	49	0	58	Qualification for promotion play-offs preliminary round
6	Chievo	38	14	14	10	48	38	+10	56	Qualification for promotion play-offs preliminary round
7	Empoli	38	14	12	12	47	48	−1	54 (Note: Head-to-head points: Empoli 9, Frosinone 5, Pisa 2.)	Qualification for promotion play-offs preliminary round
8	Frosinone	38	14	12	12	41	38	+3	54	Qualification for promotion play-offs preliminary round
9	Pisa	38	14	12	12	49	45	+4	54	
10	Salernitana	38	14	10	14	53	50	+3	52	
11	Venezia	38	12	14	12	37	40	−3	50	
12	Cremonese	38	12	13	13	42	43	−1	49	
13	Virtus Entella	38	12	12	14	46	50	−4	48	
14	Ascoli	38	13	7	18	50	58	−8	46 (Note: Ascoli finished ahead of Cosenza on head-to-head points: Ascoli 3–2 Cosenza, Cosenza 0–1 Ascoli.)	
15	Cosenza	38	12	10	16	50	49	+1	46	
16	Perugia (R)	38	12	9	17	38	49	−11	45 (Note: Perugia finished ahead of Pescara on head-to-head points: Perugia 3–1 Pescara, Pescara 2–2 Perugia.)	Qualification for relegation play-out
17	Pescara (O)	38	12	9	17	48	55	−7	45	Qualification for relegation play-out
18	Trapani (Note: Deducted 2 points for administrative irregularities.) (R)	38	11	13	14	48	60	−12	44	Relegation to Serie C
19	Juve Stabia (R)	38	11	8	19	47	63	−16	41	Relegation to Serie C
20	Livorno (R)	38	5	6	27	30	67	−37	21	Relegation to Serie C

Source: Lega Serie B (in Italian) SOCCERWAY (in English)
Rules for classification: 1) Points; 2) Head-to-head points; 3) Head-to-head goal difference; 4) Goal difference; 5) Goals scored; 6) Draw.
(C) Champions; (O) Play-off winners; (P) Promoted; (R) Relegated

===== Promotion play-offs =====
Preliminary round
5	Cittadella	2
8	Frosinone (a.e.t.)	3
6	Chievo (a.e.t.)	1
7	Empoli	1

Semi-finals
8	Frosinone	0	2	2
4	Pordenone	1	0	1
6	Chievo	2	1	3
3	Spezia	0	3	3

Final
8	Frosinone	0	1	1
3	Spezia	1	0	1

==== Serie C ====
Group A (North & Central West)

Pos	Team	Pld	Pts
1	Monza (C, P)	27	61
2	Carrarese	27	45
3	Renate	27	43
4	Pontedera	27	42
5	Alessandria	27	40
6	Robur Siena (D, R)	27	39
7	Novara	26	38
8	AlbinoLeffe	27	39
9	Arezzo	27	37
10	Juventus U23	27	36
11	Pro Patria	26	32
12	Pistoiese	27	33
13	Como	26	32
14	Pro Vercelli	26	31
15	Lecco	26	28
16	Pergolettese (O)	27	27
17	Giana Erminio	26	26
18	Olbia (O)	27	25
19	Pianese (R)	27	24
20	Gozzano (R)	27	22

Source: Lega Pro
(C) Champions;
(D) Disqualified;
(O) Play-off winners;
(P) Promoted;
(R) Relegated
Group B (North & Central East)

Pos	Team	Pld	Pts
1	L.R. Vicenza (C, P)	27	61
2	Reggio Audace (O, P)	27	55
3	Carpi	26	53
4	Südtirol	27	48
5	Padova	26	44
6	Feralpisalò	26	44
7	Piacenza	26	41
8	Triestina	27	40
9	Modena	27	40
10	Sambenedettese	26	33
11	Fermana	27	33
12	Virtus Verona	27	32
13	Cesena	27	30
14	Vis Pesaro	27	28
15	Gubbio	27	28
16	Ravenna	27	27
17	Imolese (O)	27	23
18	Arzignano (R)	26	22
19	Fano (O)	27	21
20	Rimini (R)	27	21

Source: Lega Pro
(C) Champions;
(O) Play-off winners;
(P) Promoted;
(R) Relegated
Group C (South)

Pos	Team	Pld	Pts
1	Reggina (C, P)	30	69
2	Bari	30	60
3	Monopoli	30	57
4	Potenza	30	56
5	Ternana	30	51
6	Catania	30	45
7	Catanzaro	30	43
8	Teramo	30	41
9	Virtus Francavilla	30	40
10	Avellino	30	40
11	Vibonese	30	39
12	Viterbese Castrense	30	39
13	Cavese	30	38
14	Paganese	30	36
15	Casertana	30	36
16	Sicula Leonzio (O, D, R)	30	29
17	Bisceglie	30	20
18	Rende (R)	30	18
19	Rieti (R)	30	15
20	Picerno (O, D, R)	30	32

Source: Lega Pro
(C) Champions;
(D) Disqualified;
(O) Play-off winners;
(P) Promoted;
(R) Relegated

=== Women ===
==== Serie A (women) ====
Pos	Team	Pld	W	D	L	GF	GA	GD	Pts	Qualification or relegation
1	Juventus (C)	16	14	2	0	48	10	+38	44	Qualification to Champions League
2	Fiorentina	15	11	2	2	40	15	+25	35	Qualification to Champions League
3	Milan	15	11	2	2	35	15	+20	35	
4	Roma	16	11	1	4	41	17	+24	34	
5	Sassuolo	16	7	2	7	29	19	+10	23	
6	Inter	16	5	4	7	20	27	−7	19	
7	Florentia	16	7	3	6	24	26	−2	24	
8	Empoli	16	5	4	7	22	24	−2	19	
9	Verona	16	3	3	10	16	39	−23	12	
10	Pink Bari	16	1	8	7	14	26	−12	11	
11	Tavagnacco (R)	16	2	4	10	9	32	−23	10	Relegation to Serie B
12	Orobica (R)	16	0	1	15	6	51	−45	1	Relegation to Serie B

Source: soccerway.com
Rules for classification: 1) Points; 2) Goal difference; 3) Number of goals scored; 4) Head-to-head points; 5) Head-to-head goal difference; 6) Head-to-head away goals scored
(C) Champions; (R) Relegated

== Cup competitions ==
=== Coppa Italia ===
==== Final ====
17 June 2020
21:00 CEST (UTC+2)

Napoli	0–0	Juventus
	Report
Penalties
Insigne (penalty scored); Politano (penalty scored); Maksimović (penalty scored); Milik (penalty scored)	4–2	(penalty missed) Dybala; (penalty missed) Danilo; (penalty scored) Bonucci; (penalty scored) Ramsey

Stadio Olimpico, Rome
Attendance: 0 (Note: The final was played behind closed doors due to the COVID-19 pandemic in Italy.)
Referee: Daniele Doveri

=== Supercoppa Italiana ===
22 December 2019
19:45 AST

Juventus	1–3	Lazio
Dybala 45'	Report	Luis Alberto 16'; Lulić 73'; Cataldi 90+4'

King Saud University Stadium, Riyadh (Saudi Arabia)
Attendance: 23,361
Referee: Gianpaolo Calvarese

== UEFA competitions ==
=== UEFA Champions League ===
==== Group stage ====
===== Group C =====
Pos	Team	Pld	W	D	L	GF	GA	GD	Pts	Qualification	MCI	ATA	SHK	DZG
1	(England) Manchester City	6	4	2	0	16	4	+12	14	Advance to knockout phase	—	5–1	1–1	2–0
2	(Italy) Atalanta	6	2	1	3	8	12	−4	7	Advance to knockout phase	1–1	—	1–2	2–0
3	(Ukraine) Shakhtar Donetsk	6	1	3	2	8	13	−5	6	Transfer to Europa League	0–3	0–3	—	2–2
4	(Croatia) Dinamo Zagreb	6	1	2	3	10	13	−3	5		1–4	4–0	3–3	—

Source: UEFA

===== Group D =====
Pos	Team	Pld	W	D	L	GF	GA	GD	Pts	Qualification	JUV	ATM	LEV	LMO
1	(Italy) Juventus	6	5	1	0	12	4	+8	16	Advance to knockout phase	—	1–0	3–0	2–1
2	(Spain) Atlético Madrid	6	3	1	2	8	5	+3	10	Advance to knockout phase	2–2	—	1–0	2–0
3	(Germany) Bayer Leverkusen	6	2	0	4	5	9	−4	6	Transfer to Europa League	0–2	2–1	—	1–2
4	(Russia) Lokomotiv Moscow	6	1	0	5	4	11	−7	3		1–2	0–2	0–2	—

Source: UEFA

===== Group E =====
Pos	Team	Pld	W	D	L	GF	GA	GD	Pts	Qualification	LIV	NAP	SAL	GNK
1	(England) Liverpool	6	4	1	1	13	8	+5	13	Advance to knockout phase	—	1–1	4–3	2–1
2	(Italy) Napoli	6	3	3	0	11	4	+7	12	Advance to knockout phase	2–0	—	1–1	4–0
3	(Austria) Red Bull Salzburg	6	2	1	3	16	13	+3	7	Transfer to Europa League	0–2	2–3	—	6–2
4	(Belgium) Genk	6	0	1	5	5	20	−15	1		1–4	0–0	1–4	—

Source: UEFA

===== Group F =====
Pos	Team	Pld	W	D	L	GF	GA	GD	Pts	Qualification	BAR	DOR	INT	SLP
1	(Spain) Barcelona	6	4	2	0	9	4	+5	14	Advance to knockout phase	—	3–1	2–1	0–0
2	(Germany) Borussia Dortmund	6	3	1	2	8	8	0	10	Advance to knockout phase	0–0	—	3–2	2–1
3	(Italy) Inter Milan	6	2	1	3	10	9	+1	7	Transfer to Europa League	1–2	2–0	—	1–1
4	(Czech Republic) Slavia Prague	6	0	2	4	4	10	−6	2		1–2	0–2	1–3	—

Source: UEFA

==== Knockout phase ====
===== Round of 16 =====
Team 1	Agg.	Team 2	1st leg	2nd leg
Atalanta (Italy)	8–4	(Spain) Valencia	4–1	4–3
Lyon (France)	2–2 (a)	(Italy) Juventus	1–0	1–2
Napoli (Italy)	2–4	(Spain) Barcelona	1–1	1–3

===== Quarter-finals =====
Team 1	Score	Team 2
Atalanta (Italy)	1–2	(France) Paris Saint-Germain

=== UEFA Europa League ===
==== Second qualifying round ====
Team 1	Agg.	Team 2	1st leg	2nd leg
Torino (Italy)	7–1	(Hungary) Debrecen	3–0	4–1

==== Third qualifying round ====
Team 1	Agg.	Team 2	1st leg	2nd leg
Torino (Italy)	6–1	(Belarus) Shakhtyor Soligorsk	5–0	1–1

==== Play-off round ====
Team 1	Agg.	Team 2	1st leg	2nd leg
Torino (Italy)	3–5	(England) Wolverhampton Wanderers	2–3	1–2

==== Group stage ====
===== Group E =====
Pos	Team	Pld	W	D	L	GF	GA	GD	Pts	Qualification	CEL	CLJ	LAZ	REN
1	(Scotland) Celtic	6	4	1	1	10	6	+4	13	Advance to knockout phase	—	2–0	2–1	3–1
2	(Romania) CFR Cluj	6	4	0	2	6	4	+2	12	Advance to knockout phase	2–0	—	2–1	1–0
3	(Italy) Lazio	6	2	0	4	6	9	−3	6		1–2	1–0	—	2–1
4	(France) Rennes	6	1	1	4	5	8	−3	4		1–1	0–1	2–0	—

Source: UEFA

===== Group J =====
Pos	Team	Pld	W	D	L	GF	GA	GD	Pts	Qualification	IBS	ROM	MGB	WLB
1	(Turkey) İstanbul Başakşehir	6	3	1	2	7	9	−2	10	Advance to knockout phase	—	0–3	1–1	1–0
2	(Italy) Roma	6	2	3	1	12	6	+6	9	Advance to knockout phase	4–0	—	1–1	2–2
3	(Germany) Borussia Mönchengladbach	6	2	2	2	6	9	−3	8		1–2	2–1	—	0–4
4	(Austria) Wolfsberger AC	6	1	2	3	7	8	−1	5		0–3	1–1	0–1	—

Source: UEFA

==== Knockout phase ====
===== Round of 32 =====
Team 1	Agg.	Team 2	1st leg	2nd leg
Ludogorets Razgrad (Bulgaria)	1–4	(Italy) Inter Milan	0–2	1–2
Roma (Italy)	2–1	(Belgium) Gent	1–0	1–1

===== Round of 16 =====
Team 1	Score	Team 2
Inter Milan (Italy)	2–0	(Spain) Getafe
Sevilla (Spain)	2–0	(Italy) Roma

===== Quarter-finals =====
Team 1	Score	Team 2
Inter Milan (Italy)	2–1	(Germany) Bayer Leverkusen

===== Semi-finals =====
Team 1	Score	Team 2
Inter Milan (Italy)	5–0	(Ukraine) Shakhtar Donetsk

===== Final =====
21 August 2020
21:00 UTC+2

Sevilla (Spain)	3–2	(Italy) Inter Milan
De Jong 12', 33'; Lukaku 74' (o.g.)	Report	Lukaku 5' (pen.); Godín 36'

RheinEnergieStadion, Cologne
Attendance: 0 (Note: The remainder of the competition, held in August 2020, was played behind closed doors due to the COVID-19 pandemic in Europe.)
Referee: Danny Makkelie (Netherlands)

=== UEFA Youth League ===
==== UEFA Champions League Path ====
===== Group C =====
Pos	Team	Pld	W	D	L	GF	GA	GD	Pts	Qualification	ATA	DZG	MCI	SHK
1	(Italy) Atalanta	6	4	1	1	10	5	+5	13	Round of 16	—	2–0	1–0	2–2
2	(Croatia) Dinamo Zagreb	6	3	2	1	6	5	+1	11	Play-offs	1–0	—	1–0	1–0
3	(England) Manchester City	6	2	1	3	11	8	+3	7		1–3	2–2	—	5–0
4	(Ukraine) Shakhtar Donetsk	6	0	2	4	5	14	−9	2		1–2	1–1	1–3	—

Source: UEFA

===== Group D =====
Pos	Team	Pld	W	D	L	GF	GA	GD	Pts	Qualification	JUV	ATM	LEV	LMO
1	(Italy) Juventus	6	5	0	1	17	4	+13	15	Round of 16	—	2–1	4–1	1–2
2	(Spain) Atlético Madrid	6	4	0	2	11	8	+3	12	Play-offs	0–4	—	2–0	3–0
3	(Germany) Bayer Leverkusen	6	1	1	4	6	16	−10	4 (Note: Ranked on head-to-head points: Bayer Leverkusen 4, Lokomotiv Moscow 1.)		0–5	0–2	—	2–2
4	(Russia) Lokomotiv Moscow	6	1	1	4	7	13	−6	4		0–1	2–3	1–3	—

Source: UEFA

===== Group E =====
Pos	Team	Pld	W	D	L	GF	GA	GD	Pts	Qualification	LIV	SAL	GNK	NAP
1	(England) Liverpool	6	4	1	1	17	6	+11	13	Round of 16	—	4–2	0–1	7–0
2	(Austria) Red Bull Salzburg	6	3	1	2	19	11	+8	10	Play-offs	2–3	—	1–1	7–2
3	(Belgium) Genk	6	2	2	2	5	6	−1	8		0–2	0–2	—	3–1
4	(Italy) Napoli	6	0	2	4	5	23	−18	2		1–1	1–5	0–0	—

Source: UEFA

===== Group F =====
Pos	Team	Pld	W	D	L	GF	GA	GD	Pts	Qualification	INT	DOR	SLP	BAR
1	(Italy) Inter Milan	6	4	0	2	15	7	+8	12 (Note: Tied on head-to-head points (3). Ranked on head-to-head goal difference: Inter Milan +2, Borussia Dortmund −2.)	Round of 16	—	4–1	4–0	2–0
2	(Germany) Borussia Dortmund	6	4	0	2	12	9	+3	12	Play-offs	2–1	—	5–1	2–1
3	(Czech Republic) Slavia Prague	6	3	0	3	9	16	−7	9		4–1	1–0	—	0–4
4	(Spain) Barcelona	6	1	0	5	8	12	−4	3		0–3	1–2	2–3	—

Source: UEFA

==== Knockout phase ====
===== Round of 16 =====
Team 1	Score	Team 2
Internazionale (Italy)	1–0 (Note: On 9 March 2020, Internazionale announced that they had suspended all activities of their youth teams due to the COVID-19 pandemic in Italy, and thus would not play their round of 16 match against Rennes, and the match had originally been cancelled. UEFA decided not to punish Internazionale due to the unprecedented situation caused by COVID-19 and following an agreement by both clubs, the match was rescheduled.)	(France) Rennes
Juventus (Italy)	1–3	(Spain) Real Madrid

===== Quarter-finals =====
Team 1	Score	Team 2
Internazionale (Italy)	0–3	(Spain) Real Madrid

=== UEFA Women's Champions League ===
==== Knockout phase ====
===== Round of 32 =====
Team 1	Agg.	Team 2	1st leg	2nd leg
Juventus (Italy)	1–4	(Spain) Barcelona	0–2	1–2
Fiorentina (Italy)	0–6 (Note: Order of legs reversed after original draw.)	(England) Arsenal	0–4	0–2
