= Sofija Krajšumović =

Bosnian footballer

Personal information
- Date of birth: 12 July 2002 (age 24)
- Place of birth: Milići, Bosnia and Herzegovina
- Position: Forward

Team information
- Current team: ŽFK Crvena zvezda
- Number: 10

Senior career*
Years	Team	Apps	(Gls)
2021-2022	ŽFK Radnik-Bumerang	21	(30)
2022-	ŽFK Crvena zvezda		

International career^{‡}
2018-2019	Bosnia and Herzegovina U17	12	(5)
2020	Bosnia and Herzegovina U19	2	(1)
2020-	Bosnia and Herzegovina	16	(8)
- * Club domestic league appearances and goals as of 21:27, 6 September 2022 (UTC) ‡ National team caps and goals as of 21:27, 6 September 2022 (UTC)

Sofija Krajšumović (born 12 July 2002) is a Bosnian footballer who plays as a FK Crvena zvezda Beograd. She started her career at ŽFK Radnik-Bumerang (short for Ženski fudbalski klub Radnik-Bumerang), and has appeared for the Bosnia and Herzegovina women's national team.

== Career ==
Krajšumović has been capped for the Bosnia and Herzegovina national team, appearing for the team during the UEFA Women's Euro 2021 qualifying cycle.

== International goals ==
No.	Date	Venue	Opponent	Score	Result	Competition
1.	30 August 2019	Bosnia and Herzegovina FA Training Centre, Zenica, Bosnia & Herzegovina	Georgia	7–0	7–1	UEFA Women's Euro 2022 qualifying
2.	12 November 2019	Sammy Ofer Stadium, Haifa, Israel	Israel	1–1	3–1	UEFA Women's Euro 2022 qualifying
3.	10 March 2020	Centenary Stadium, Ta'Qali, Malta	Malta	1–0	3–2	UEFA Women's Euro 2022 qualifying
4.	10 March 2020	Centenary Stadium, Ta'Qali, Malta	Malta	2–0	3–2	UEFA Women's Euro 2022 qualifying
5.	10 March 2020	Centenary Stadium, Ta'Qali, Malta	Malta	3–0	3–2	UEFA Women's Euro 2022 qualifying
6.	1 December 2020	Mikheil Meskhi Stadium, Tbilisi, Georgia	Georgia	2–0	3–0	UEFA Women's Euro 2022 qualifying
7.	1 December 2020	Mikheil Meskhi Stadium, Tbilisi, Georgia	Georgia	3–0	3–0	UEFA Women's Euro 2022 qualifying
8.	12 April 2022	Camp FSCG, Podgorica. Montenegro	Montenegro	1–0	2–0	2023 FIFA Women's World Cup qualification
9.	21 February 2025	Bosnia and Herzegovina FA Training Centre, Zenica, Bosnia and Herzegovina	Romania	4–0	4–0	2025 UEFA Women's Nations League
10.	4 April 2025	Gdańsk Stadium, Gdańsk, Poland	Poland	1–1	1–5	2025 UEFA Women's Nations League
11.	8 April 2025	Bosnia and Herzegovina FA Training Centre, Zenica, Bosnia and Herzegovina	Poland	1–0	1–1	2025 UEFA Women's Nations League
12.	3 June 2025	Bosnia and Herzegovina FA Training Centre, Zenica, Bosnia and Herzegovina	Northern Ireland	1–1	1–1	2025 UEFA Women's Nations League
