= Koral Hazan =

Israeli footballer

Koral Hazan קורל חזן
Personal information
- Date of birth: 17 January 1999 (age 27)
- Position: Forward

Team information
- Current team: Hapoel Ra'anana

Youth career
- 2012–2013: Bnot Caesarea
- 2013–2015: Maccabi Kishronot Hadera

Senior career*
Years	Team	Apps	(Gls)
2014–2015	Maccabi Kishronot Hadera	3	(1)
2015–2017	Girls Football Academy	39	(26)
2018–2019	Hapoel Ra'anana	9	(2)
2019	Ramat HaSharon	14	(2)
2020–2021	Maccabi Emek Hefer	15	(16)
2021–2022	Split	10	(16)
2022–2023	Maccabi Emek Hefer	2	(0)
2023–2024	Tenerife B	24	(4)
2024–2025	Hapoel Tel Aviv	20	(5)
2025–	Hapoel Ra'anana	16	(2)

International career^{‡}
2015	Israel U16	3	(0)
2014–2015	Israel U17	8	(1)
2020–	Israel	22	(2)
- * Club domestic league appearances and goals as of 8 October 2026 ‡ National team caps and goals as of 1 June 2024

Koral Hazan (Hebrew: קורל חזן; born 17 January 1999) is an Israeli footballer who plays as a forward for Israeli club Hapoel Ra'anana in the Israeli Ligat Nashim and for the Israel women's national team. She has previously played for Israeli clubs Maccabi Kishronot Hadera, Girls Football Academy, Ramat HaSharon, Maccabi Emek Hefer, and Hapoel Tel Aviv as well as overseas with Split in Croatia and Tenerife in Spain.

== Club career ==
=== Youth ===
Hazan picked up a football at the age of 4 and at age 13 was invited to join Bnot Caesarea by a former national team player following a video of her on the internet. In her first game she scored four goals and after two successful years joined Maccabi Kishronot Hadera, from which she made her way to the Girls Football Academy. She captained the club and scored 26 goals over two seasons. After her enlistment in the Israel Defense Forces for her mandatory military service, Hazan returned to a training camp from a month-long recruitment camp and suffered an ACL injury.

=== Hapoel Ra'anana and Ramat HaSharon ===
Following ten months of rehabilitation without playing football, Hazan joined Hapoel Ra'anana and mid-season moved to top team Ramat HaSharon.

=== Maccabi Emek Hefer ===
Hazan played the 2020–21 season for Maccabi Emek Hefer and finished as the league's top scorer, having scored 16 league goals and 23 goals in all competitions.

=== Split ===
In September 2021, Hazan made her first move to Europe, joining Croatian Women's First Football League club Split. In the penultimate match of the 2021–22 Croatian Women's First Football League, she scored five goals in an 11–0 victory over Rijeka and helped secured the league title. Finishing the campaign with 21 league goals, she was considered one of the best strikers in Croatia. Her season with Split was considered successful and also included being named in the squad for the 2022–23 UEFA Women's Champions League qualifying rounds, though she remained an unused substitute in both matches against BIIK Kazygurt and Lanchkhuti.

=== Return to Maccabi Emek Hefer ===
In September 2022, after a year in Croatia, despite interest from European clubs, Hazan returned to Maccabi Emek Hefer. She claimed that the club is like a second home for her and appreciated the support during her rehabilitation from her second ACL injury. Her return to Israel wasn't simple, as she sustained a serious ankle injury that severely limited her playing time, the third significant injury in her career, leading to a long rehabilitation time.

=== Tenerife ===
In August 2023, Hazan joined Spanish club Tenerife. In her first week at the club, she took part in the Teide Trophy final and helped the club win the trophy with a 1–0 victory over Athletic Bilbao. Due to her recovery from her serious ankle injury, Hazan initially played for the reserves team in the league. Following the events of the October 7 attacks, while returning from injury, Hazan chose to wear a black armband for the game on 8 October and her teammates supported her by wearing armbands too. During the same period, the Royal Spanish Football Federation made a decision not allowing her to celebrate scoring with the Israeli flag. In November, Hazan scored her debut goal for the reserves side, in the Tenerife derby against Fundación CD Tenerife. Over the season, she scored 4 goals in 24 matches for the reserves team, but didn't make a first team league appearance.

=== Hapoel Tel Aviv ===
In August 2024, Hazan returned to Israel and signed a one-year contract with Hapoel Tel Aviv.

=== Return to Hapoel Ra'anana ===
In June 2025, Hazan returned to Hapoel Ra'anana, alongside fellow international Maya Chitman.

== International career ==
Hazan has represented Israel internationally at youth level, scoring once in eight appearances for the under-17 team as well as making three appearances for the under-16 team. She played in editions of the UEFA Development Tournament in June 2014 and May 2015 and represented the under-17 team in the 2015 UEFA Under-17 Championship qualifiers in October 2014, where she scored against Slovenia and in the 2016 UEFA Under-17 Championship qualifiers in October 2015.

Hazan was called up for the Israel national team and made her senior debut in October 2020 against Denmark during the 2020 Euro qualifiers. Six days later, she scored her first international senior goal against Georgia. Hazan also played for the team during the 2023 FIFA Women's World Cup qualifying cycle in group H, including scoring a goal in a 2–3 loss to Turkey in November 2021.

== International goals ==
No.	Date	Venue	Opponent	Score	Result	Competition
1.	27 October 2020	Mikheil Meskhi Stadium, Tbilisi, Georgia	Georgia	1–0	2–1	UEFA Women's Euro 2022 qualifying
2.	30 November 2021	Mersin Arena, Mersin, Turkey	Turkey	1–0	2–3	2023 FIFA Women's World Cup qualification

== Personal life ==
Hazan was born and raised in Porat, a moshav in the Sharon plain.
