= Aida Hadžić =

Bosnia and Herzegovina footballer

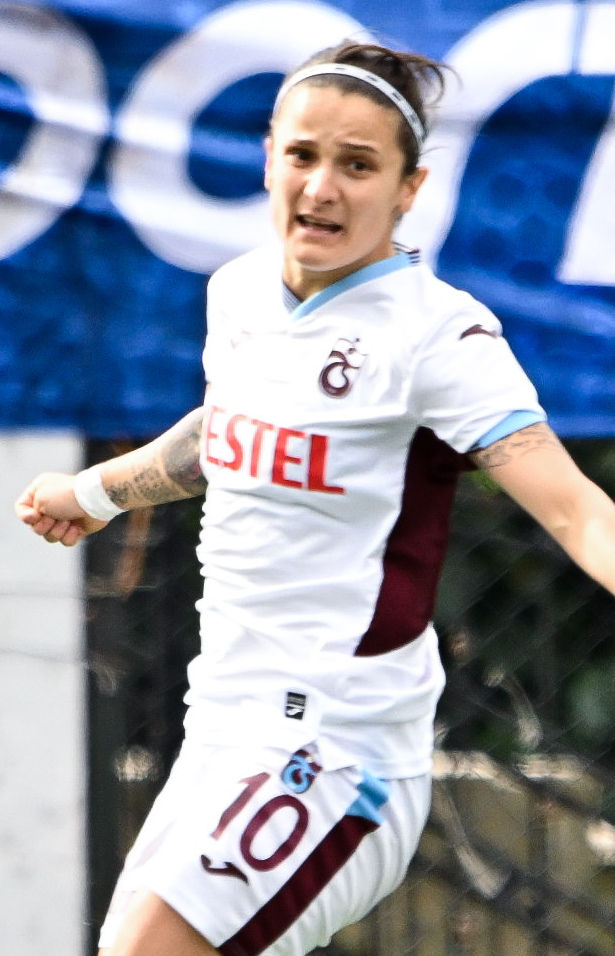

Personal information
- Date of birth: 11 September 1992 (age 34)
- Place of birth: Makarska, Yugoslavia
- Height: 1.63 m (5 ft 4 in)
- Position: Attacking midfielder

Team information
- Current team: Trabzonspor
- Number: 10

Youth career
- SFK 2000 Sarajevo

Senior career*
Years	Team	Apps	(Gls)
2019-2023	ŽNK Split	123	(39)
2023-	Trabzonspor	32	(1)

International career^{‡}
2009-	Bosnia and Herzegovina		
- * Club domestic league appearances and goals as of 15 September 2024 ‡ National team caps and goals as of 19:27, 30 August 2019 (UTC)

Aida Hadžić (born 11 September 1992) is a Bosnian women's football midfielder who plays in the Turkish Super League for Trabzonspor and has appeared for the Bosnia and Herzegovina women's national team.

== Club career ==
In August 2023, Hadžić moved to Turkey and signed with Trabzonspor to play in the 2023–24 Super League season.

== International career ==
Hadžić has been capped for the Bosnia and Herzegovina national team, appearing for the team during the 2019 FIFA Women's World Cup qualifying cycle.

== International goals ==
No.	Date	Venue	Opponent	Score	Result	Competition
1.	30 August 2019	Bosnia and Herzegovina FA Training Centre, Zenica, Bosnia & Herzegovina	Georgia	4–0	7–1	UEFA Women's Euro 2022 qualifying
