= Ana Cheminava =

Georgian footballer

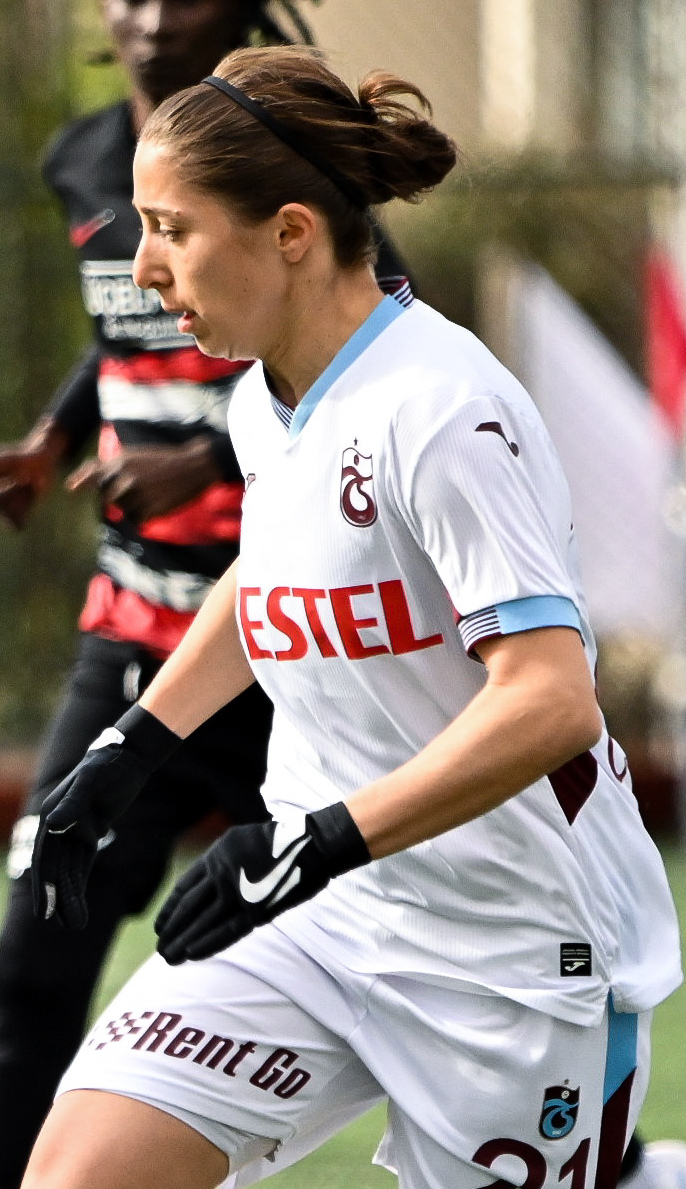

Personal information
- Date of birth: 1 February 1996 (age 30)
- Height: 1.75 m (5 ft 9 in)
- Position: Forward

Senior career*
Years	Team	Apps	(Gls)
2015–2021	MFA Žalgiris	97	(43)
2021–2022	Fomget G.S.	11	(5)
2022	FC Sogdiana		
2022–2023	Eastern Flames		
2023–2024	MFA Žalgiris		
2024–2026	Hapoel Tel Aviv	25	(7)

International career^{‡}
2012–2013	Georgia U17	6	(2)
2014–2015	Georgia U19	5	(2)
2015–	Georgia	13	(1)
- * Club domestic league appearances and goals as of 27 February 2022 ‡ National team caps and goals as of 30 November 2021

Ana Cheminava (Georgian: ანა ჩემინავა; born 1 February 1996) is a Georgian footballer, who last played as a forward for Ligat Nashim club Hapoel Tel Aviv, and the Georgia women's national team.

== Club career ==
Between 2015 and 2021, Cheminava played for the Lithuanian Women's A League club MFA Žalgiris.

By December 2021, she moved to Turkey and joined the Ankara-based club Fomget G.S. to play in the 2021–22 Turkcell Women's Super League.

In August 2024, Cheminava joined Israeli club Hapoel Tel Aviv, signing a one-year contract with an extension option. She mentioned her excitement about the club wearing the same colours as her national team, Georgia. In her first season with the club, she played 11 matches before suffering an anterior cruciate ligament injury. Following the club's support of her through the rehabilitation, she signed a new one-year contract with an extension option in July 2025. In July 2026, she departed the club after making 30 appearances in all competitions.

== International career ==
Cheminava was a member of the Georgia girls' U17 (2012–2013= and the Georgia women's U19 (2014–2015) teams.

She has been capped for the Georgia national team, appearing for the team during the 2019 FIFA Women's World Cup qualifying cycle.

== International goals ==
No.	Date	Venue	Opponent	Score	Result	Competition
1.	30 August 2019	Bosnia and Herzegovina FA Training Centre, Zenica, Bosnia and Herzegovina	Bosnia and Herzegovina	1–7	1–7	UEFA Women's Euro 2022 qualifying
2.	26 September 2023	Stade Émile Mayrisch, Esch-sur-Alzette, Luxembourg	Luxembourg	1–0	1–1	2023–24 UEFA Women's Nations League
3.	25 February 2024	Mikheil Meskhi Stadium, Tbilisi, Georgia	North Macedonia	2–0	3–0	Friendly
4.	25 February 2024	Mikheil Meskhi Stadium, Tbilisi, Georgia	North Macedonia	3–0	3–0	Friendly
