= UEFA Women's Euro 2022 qualifying Group B =

Football tournament qualification stage

Group B of the UEFA Women's Euro 2022 qualifying competition consists of six teams: Italy, Denmark, Bosnia and Herzegovina, Israel, Malta, and Georgia. The composition of the nine groups in the qualifying group stage was decided by the draw held on 21 February 2019, 13:30 CET (UTC+1), at the UEFA headquarters in Nyon, Switzerland. with the teams seeded according to their coefficient ranking.

The group is played in home-and-away round-robin format between August 2019 and December 2020. The group winners and the three best runners-up among all nine groups (not counting results against the sixth-placed team) qualify directly for the final tournament, while the remaining six runners-up advance to the play-offs.

On 17 March 2020, all matches were put on hold due to the COVID-19 pandemic.

== Standings ==
Pos	Team	Pld	W	D	L	GF	GA	GD	Pts	Qualification	Denmark	Italy	Bosnia and Herzegovina	Malta	Israel	Georgia
1	Denmark	10	9	1	0	48	1	+47	28	Final tournament	—	0–0	2–0	8–0	4–0	14–0
2	Italy	10	8	1	1	37	5	+32	25	Final tournament	1–3	—	2–0	5–0	12–0	6–0
3	Bosnia and Herzegovina	10	6	0	4	19	17	+2	18		0–4	0–5	—	2–0	1–0	7–1
4	Malta	10	3	1	6	11	30	−19	10		0–8	0–2	2–3	—	1–1	2–1
5	Israel	10	2	1	7	10	30	−20	7		0–3	2–3	1–3	0–2	—	4–0
6	Georgia	10	0	0	10	3	45	−42	0		0–2	0–1	0–3	0–4	1–2	—

Source: UEFA
Rules for classification: Tiebreakers

== Matches ==
Times are CET/CEST, (Note: CEST (UTC+2) for dates between 31 March and 26 October 2019 and between 29 March and 24 October 2020, and CET (UTC+1) for all other dates.) as listed by UEFA (local times, if different, are in parentheses).

29 August 2019
17:30 (18:30 IDT)

Israel	2–3	Italy
Goor 32'; Awad 90+1'	Report	Girelli 45+2'; Bartoli 64'; Giacinti 71'

Ramat Gan Stadium, Ramat Gan
Attendance: 1,430
Referee: Volha Tsiareshka (Belarus)
29 August 2019
18:00

Denmark	8–0	Malta
Troelsgaard 5', 45+2'; Harder 19'; Sevecke 28'; Larsen 58', 90+2'; Gejl 75'; Sørensen 86'	Report

Viborg Stadium, Viborg
Attendance: 3,890
Referee: Angelika Söder (Germany)

30 August 2019
17:00

Bosnia and Herzegovina	7–1	Georgia
Spasojević 5'; Hasanbegović 10'; Nikolić 13', 51' (pen.); Hadžić 23'; Aleksić 43' (pen.); Krajšumović 80'	Report	Cheminava 90'

Bosnia and Herzegovina FA Training Centre, Zenica
Attendance: 150
Referee: Katarzyna Lisiecka-Sęk (Poland)

3 September 2019
14:15 (16:15 GET)

Georgia	0–1	Italy
	Report	Girelli 24'

Mikheil Meskhi Stadium, Tbilisi
Attendance: 150
Referee: Vivian Peeters (Netherlands)
3 September 2019
17:00

Bosnia and Herzegovina	2–0	Malta
Nikolić 72', 80'	Report

Koševo City Stadium, Sarajevo
Attendance: 96
Referee: Cansu Tiryaki (Turkey)
3 September 2019
18:00 (19:00 IDT)

Israel	0–3	Denmark
	Report	Barkai 13' (o.g.); Nadim 80'; Harder 84'

Ramat Gan Stadium, Ramat Gan
Attendance: 1,070
Referee: Sandra Strub (Switzerland)

4 October 2019
17:00

Denmark	2–0	Bosnia and Herzegovina
St. Pedersen 13'; Troelsgaard 68'	Report

Viborg Stadium, Viborg
Attendance: 4,552
Referee: Monika Mularczyk (Poland)
4 October 2019
17:30

Malta	0–2	Italy
	Report	Bartoli 69'; Girelli 90+2' (pen.)

Centenary Stadium, Ta' Qali
Attendance: 764
Referee: Ivana Projkovska (North Macedonia)

8 October 2019
17:30

Italy	2–0	Bosnia and Herzegovina
Girelli 3'; Giugliano 28'	Report

Stadio Renzo Barbera, Palermo
Attendance: 5,100
Referee: Hristiyana Guteva (Bulgaria)
8 October 2019
18:00 (20:00 GET)

Georgia	0–2	Denmark
	Report	Gejl 14'; Sørensen 58'

Mikheil Meskhi Stadium-2, Tbilisi
Attendance: 287
Referee: Reelika Turi (Estonia)

7 November 2019
17:00

Malta	1–1	Israel
Farrugia 37'	Report	Beck 63'

Centenary Stadium, Ta' Qali
Attendance: 317
Referee: Aleksandra Česen (Slovenia)

8 November 2019
17:30

Italy	6–0	Georgia
Linari 10'; Guagni 25'; Girelli 27'; Sabatino 32', 45+1'; Rosucci 52'	Report

Stadio Ciro Vigorito, Benevento
Attendance: 3,973
Referee: Iuliana Demetrescu (Romania)

12 November 2019
14:15

Italy	5–0	Malta
Cernoia 27', 37'; Sabatino 42'; Giugliano 45'; Greggi 90+3'	Report

Stadio Teofilo Patini, Castel di Sangro
Attendance: 2,955
Referee: Eleni Antoniou (Greece)
12 November 2019
17:00 (18:00 IST)

Israel	1–3	Bosnia and Herzegovina
Efraim 3'	Report	Krajšumović 28'; Spasojević 37'; Aleksić 80'

Sammy Ofer Stadium, Haifa
Attendance: 892
Referee: Marta Frias Acedo (Spain)
12 November 2019
18:00

Denmark	14–0	Georgia
Nadim 4', 26', 36'; Larsen 16', 19', 53'; Sørensen 27', 39'; Svava 28'; Harder 34', 45', 73'; Christiansen 82'; Madsen 90+1'	Report

Viborg Stadium, Viborg
Attendance: 3,085
Referee: Silvia Domingos (Portugal)

5 March 2020
14:30

Bosnia and Herzegovina	1–0	Israel
Nikolić 64'	Report

Bosnia and Herzegovina FA Training Centre, Zenica
Attendance: 230
Referee: Kateryna Usova (Ukraine)
5 March 2020
18:30

Malta	2–1	Georgia
Cuschieri 17'; Bugeja 46'	Report	Tchkonia 76'

Centenary Stadium, Ta' Qali
Attendance: 392
Referee: Araksya Saribekyan (Armenia)

10 March 2020
18:00 (19:00 IST)

Israel	4–0	Georgia
Elinav 13'; Falkon 62' (pen.); Awad 80' (pen.); Sutidze 90+1' (o.g.)	Report

Haberfeld Stadium, Rishon LeZion
Attendance: 250
Referee: Michalina Diakow (Poland)
10 March 2020
18:30

Malta	2–3	Bosnia and Herzegovina
E. Xuereb 79'; B. Borg 90+5'	Report	Krajšumović 10', 26', 54'

Centenary Stadium, Ta' Qali
Attendance: 353
Referee: Neslihan Muratdağı (Turkey)

17 September 2020 (Note: All matches originally scheduled to be played in April and June 2020 were postponed due to the COVID-19 pandemic in Europe. These matches were subsequently rescheduled to be played between September and November 2020.)
16:00

Bosnia and Herzegovina	0–4	Denmark
	Report	Nadim 37' (pen.); Troelsgaard Nielsen 43'; Sevecke 45+3'; Christiansen 90'

Bosnia and Herzegovina FA Training Centre, Zenica
Attendance: 0
Referee: Sandra Bastos (Portugal)

22 September 2020
16:00

Bosnia and Herzegovina	0–5	Italy
	Report	Galli 19'; Girelli 40', 56' (pen.), 65' (pen.); Linari 88'

Bosnia and Herzegovina FA Training Centre, Zenica
Attendance: 0
Referee: Silvia Domingos (Portugal)
22 September 2020
18:30

Malta	0–8	Denmark
	Report	Larsen 6'; Nadim 7', 42'; Troelsgaard 46', 73'; Harder 52'; Junge Pedersen 54'; Bruun 68'

Centenary Stadium, Ta' Qali
Attendance: 0
Referee: María Dolores Martinez Madrona (Spain)

21 October 2020
18:00

Denmark	4–0	Israel
Harder 48', 55'; Kuznetsov 73' (o.g.); Junge Pedersen 81'	Report

Viborg Stadium, Viborg
Attendance: 284
Referee: Reelika Turi (Estonia)

27 October 2020
12:00 (15:00 GET)

Georgia	1–2	Israel
Bakradze 70'	Report	Hazan 10'; Shtainshnaider 61'

Mikheil Meskhi Stadium, Tbilisi
Attendance: 0
Referee: Liudmyla Telbukh (Ukraine)
27 October 2020
17:30

Italy	1–3	Denmark
Giacinti 60'	Report	Giuliani 6' (o.g.); Nadim 17', 47'

Stadio Carlo Castellani, Empoli
Attendance: 0
Referee: Cheryl Foster (Wales)

26 November 2020
12:00 (15:00 GET)

Georgia	0–4	Malta
	Report	S. Zammit 34'; Bugeja 44', 52', 58'

Mikheil Meskhi Stadium, Tbilisi
Attendance: 0
Referee: Simona Ghisletta (Switzerland)

1 December 2020 (Note: Matches originally scheduled to be played on 22 September 2020 were rearranged following postponements to other matches due to the COVID-19 pandemic in Europe.)
12:00 (15:00 GET)

Georgia	0–3	Bosnia and Herzegovina
	Report	Damjanović 22'; Krajšumović 64', 77'

Mikheil Meskhi Stadium, Tbilisi
Attendance: 0
Referee: Elvira Nurmustafina (Kazakhstan)
1 December 2020
15:30 (16:30 IST)

Israel	0–2	Malta
	Report	B. Borg 15'; Bugeja 59'

Ramat Gan Stadium, Ramat Gan
Attendance: 40
Referee: Ivana Projkovska (Macedonia)
1 December 2020
17:15

Denmark	0–0	Italy
	Report

Viborg Stadium, Viborg
Attendance: 210
Referee: Riem Hussein (Germany)

24 February 2021
17:30

Italy	12–0	Israel
Giacinti 3', 13'; Bonansea 5', 81'; David 19' (o.g.); Girelli 30'; Salvai 44'; Rosucci 45+2' (pen.); Sabatino 55' (pen.), 70'; Caruso 67'; Giugliano 90+1'	Report

Stadio Artemio Franchi, Florence
Attendance: 0
Referee: Ivana Martinčić (Croatia)

== Goalscorers ==
There have been 128 goals scored in 30 matches, for an average of 4.27 goals per match (as of 24 February 2021).

9 goals

- (Denmark) Nadia Nadim
- (Italy) Cristiana Girelli

8 goals

- (Denmark) Pernille Harder

7 goals

- (Bosnia and Herzegovina) Sofija Krajšumović

6 goals

- (Denmark) Stine Larsen
- (Denmark) Sanne Troelsgaard Nielsen

5 goals

- (Bosnia and Herzegovina) Milena Nikolić
- (Italy) Daniela Sabatino
- (Malta) Haley Bugeja

4 goals

- (Denmark) Nicoline Sørensen
- (Italy) Valentina Giacinti

3 goals

- (Italy) Manuela Giugliano

2 goals

- (Bosnia and Herzegovina) Marija Aleksić
- (Bosnia and Herzegovina) Dajana Spasojević
- (Denmark) Nanna Christiansen
- (Denmark) Mille Gejl
- (Denmark) Sofie Junge Pedersen
- (Denmark) Rikke Sevecke
- (Israel) Marian Awad
- (Italy) Elisa Bartoli
- (Italy) Barbara Bonansea
- (Italy) Valentina Cernoia
- (Italy) Elena Linari
- (Italy) Martina Rosucci
- (Malta) Brenda Borg

1 goal

- (Bosnia and Herzegovina) Marija Damjanović
- (Bosnia and Herzegovina) Aida Hadžić
- (Bosnia and Herzegovina) Melisa Hasanbegović
- (Denmark) Signe Bruun
- (Denmark) Rikke Madsen
- (Denmark) Stine Ballisager Pedersen
- (Denmark) Sofie Svava
- (Georgia (country)) Teona Bakradze
- (Georgia (country)) Ana Cheminava
- (Georgia (country)) Khatia Tchkonia
- (Israel) Sharon Beck
- (Israel) Mor Efraim
- (Israel) Shira Elinav
- (Israel) Lee Falkon
- (Israel) Keren Goor
- (Israel) Koral Hazan
- (Israel) Rahel Shtainshnaider
- (Italy) Arianna Caruso
- (Italy) Aurora Galli
- (Italy) Giada Greggi
- (Italy) Alia Guagni
- (Italy) Cecilia Salvai
- (Malta) Rachel Cuschieri
- (Malta) Maria Farrugia
- (Malta) Emma Xuereb
- (Malta) Shona Zammit

1 own goal

- (Georgia (country)) Nino Sutidze (against Israel)
- (Israel) Lia Barkai (against Denmark)
- (Israel) Shani David (against Italy)
- (Israel) Irena Kuznetsov (against Denmark)
- (Italy) Laura Giuliani (against Denmark)
