= UEFA Women's Euro 2022 qualifying =

Tournament details
- Dates: 29 August 2019 – 13 April 2021
- Teams: 47 (from 1 confederation)

Tournament statistics
- Matches played: 198
- Goals scored: 826 (4.17 per match)
- Attendance: 246,448 (1,245 per match)
- Top scorer(s): (Belgium) Tine De Caigny (12 goals)
- All statistics correct as of 24 February 2021.

The UEFA Women's Euro 2022 qualifying competition was a women's football competition that determined the 15 teams joining the automatically qualified hosts England in the UEFA Women's Euro 2022 final tournament.

Apart from England, 47 of the remaining 54 UEFA member national teams entered the qualifying competition, including Cyprus who entered for the first time at senior women's level, and Kosovo who entered their first Women's Euro.

== Format ==
Different from previous qualifying competitions, the preliminary round was abolished and all entrants started from the qualifying group stage. The qualifying competition consisted of two rounds:

- Qualifying group stage: The 47 teams were drawn into nine groups: two groups of six teams and seven groups of five teams. Each group was played in home-and-away round-robin format. The nine group winners and the three best runners-up (not counting results against the sixth-placed team) qualified directly for the final tournament, while the remaining six runners-up advanced to the play-offs.
- Play-offs: The six teams were drawn into three ties to play home-and-away two-legged matches to determine the last three qualified teams.

=== Tiebreakers ===
In the qualifying group stage, teams were ranked according to points (3 points for a win, 1 point for a draw, 0 points for a loss), and if tied on points, the following tiebreaking criteria were applied, in the order given, to determine the rankings (Regulations Article 14.01):

1. Points in head-to-head matches among tied teams;
2. Goal difference in head-to-head matches among tied teams;
3. Goals scored in head-to-head matches among tied teams;
4. Away goals scored in head-to-head matches among tied teams;
5. If more than two teams are tied, and after applying all head-to-head criteria above, a subset of teams are still tied, all head-to-head criteria above are reapplied exclusively to this subset of teams;
6. Goal difference in all group matches;
7. Goals scored in all group matches;
8. Away goals scored in all group matches;
9. Wins in all group matches;
10. Away wins in all group matches;
11. Disciplinary points (red card = 3 points, yellow card = 1 point, expulsion for two yellow cards in one match = 3 points);
12. UEFA coefficient ranking for the qualifying group stage draw.

To determine the three best runners-up from the qualifying group stage, the results against the teams in sixth place were discarded. The following criteria were applied (Regulations Article 14.02):

1. Points;
2. Goal difference;
3. Goals scored;
4. Away goals scored;
5. Wins;
6. Away wins;
7. Disciplinary points;
8. UEFA coefficient ranking for the qualifying group stage draw.

In the play-offs, the team that scored more goals on aggregate over the two legs qualified for the final tournament. If the aggregate score was level, the away goals rule was applied, i.e., the team that scored more goals away from home over the two legs advanced. If away goals were also equal, extra time was played. The away goals rule was again applied after extra time, i.e., if there were goals scored during extra time and the aggregate score was still level, the visiting team advancesd by virtue of more away goals scored. If no goals were scored during extra time, the tie was decided by penalty shoot-out (Regulations Article 19.01).

=== Effects of the COVID-19 pandemic ===
Due to the COVID-19 pandemic in Europe, the UEFA Executive Committee approved on 28 August 2020 the following principles for the qualifying phase of UEFA Women's Euro 2022:

- If a team cannot field the minimum required number of players (at least 13 players including at least one goalkeeper) due to positive SARS-2 coronavirus tests and the match cannot be rescheduled, the team responsible for the match not taking place are considered to have forfeited the match and lost 0–3.
- If UEFA comes to the conclusion that both or none of the teams are responsible for the match not taking place, the outcome of the match will be decided by drawing of lots, either home win 1–0, home loss 0–1 or draw 0–0, carried out by the UEFA administration.

On 24 September 2020, UEFA announced that five substitutions would be permitted for the remainder of the Women's Euro 2022 qualifying competition, with a sixth allowed in extra time during the play-offs. However, each team is only given three opportunities to make substitutions during matches, with a fourth opportunity in extra time, excluding substitutions made at half-time, before the start of extra time and at half-time in extra time.

== Schedule ==
The qualifying matches are played on dates that fall within the FIFA Women's International Match Calendar. Due to the COVID-19 pandemic, the final tournament was postponed from the summer of 2021 to 2022, and the qualifying round and play-offs were also postponed.

Stage	Draw date	FIFA international dates
Qualifying group stage	21 February 2019	26 August – 3 September 2019
Qualifying group stage	21 February 2019	30 September – 8 October 2019
Qualifying group stage	21 February 2019	4–12 November 2019
Qualifying group stage	21 February 2019	2–11 March 2020
Qualifying group stage	21 February 2019	~~6–14 April 2020~~ (matches not played due to COVID-19 pandemic)
Qualifying group stage	21 February 2019	~~1–9 June 2020~~ (matches not played due to COVID-19 pandemic)
Qualifying group stage	21 February 2019	14–22 September 2020
Qualifying group stage	21 February 2019	19–27 October 2020 (new dates due to COVID-19 pandemic)
Qualifying group stage	21 February 2019	23 November – 1 December 2020 (new dates due to COVID-19 pandemic)
Qualifying group stage	21 February 2019	15–24 February 2021 (new dates due to COVID-19 pandemic)
Play-offs	5 March 2021 (originally 25 September 2020)	5–13 April 2021 (postponed from 19–27 October 2020 due to COVID-19 pandemic)

== Entrants ==
=== Draw ===
The draw for the qualifying group stage was held on 21 February 2019, 13:30 CET (UTC+1), at the UEFA headquarters in Nyon, Switzerland.

The teams were seeded according to their coefficient ranking, calculated based on the following:

- 2015 FIFA Women's World Cup final tournament and qualifying competition (20%)
- UEFA Women's Euro 2017 final tournament and qualifying competition (40%)
- 2019 FIFA Women's World Cup qualifying competition (40%)

Each group contained one team from each of Pots 1–5 (two teams from Pot 5 for six-team group). Based on the decisions taken by the UEFA Emergency Panel, Kosovo would not be drawn in the same group as Bosnia and Herzegovina or Serbia.

Final tournament hosts
Team	Coeff.	Rank
**England**	41,819	1

Teams entering qualifying group stage

Pot 1
Team	Coeff.	Rank
**France**	40,775	2
**Germany**	40,405	3
**Netherlands**	40,003	4
**Spain**	39,181	5
**Sweden**	36,608	6
**Norway**	36,060	7
**Switzerland**	35,481	8
Scotland	35,237	9
**Italy**	34,741	10

Pot 2
Team	Coeff.	Rank
**Austria**	33,503	11
**Denmark**	32,935	12
**Iceland**	32,012	13
**Belgium**	32,007	14
Russia	28,187	15
Wales	28,042	16
Ukraine	27,260	17
**Finland**	25,907	18
Czech Republic	25,007	19

Pot 3
Team	Coeff.	Rank
**Portugal**	25,002	20
Republic of Ireland	24,617	21
Poland	23,712	22
Romania	22,432	23
Serbia	19,846	24
Slovenia	18,207	25
Hungary	17,601	26
Bosnia and Herzegovina	17,056	27
Belarus	16,361	28

Pot 4
Team	Coeff.	Rank
Turkey	16,142	29
Slovakia	16,046	30
Croatia	15,921	31
**Northern Ireland**	14,966	32
Greece	14,868	33
Israel	12,771	34
Kazakhstan	12,453	35
Albania	10,899	36
Moldova	8,237	37

Pot 5
Team	Coeff.	Rank
Faroe Islands	7,777	39
Malta	7,556	40
North Macedonia	7,242	41
Estonia	7,225	42
Montenegro	7,106	43
Georgia	6,500	44
Latvia	5,702	45
Lithuania	4,973	46
Azerbaijan	0	—
Cyprus	0	—
Kosovo	0	—

Notes

- Teams marked in **bold** qualified for the final tournament.

Did not enter
Team	Coeff.	Rank
Bulgaria	8,050	38
Luxembourg	4,237	47
Andorra	1,793	48
Armenia	0	—
Gibraltar	0	—
Liechtenstein	0	—
San Marino	0	—

== Qualifying group stage ==
=== Group A ===
Pos	Team	Pld	W	D	L	GF	GA	GD	Pts	Qualification	Netherlands	Russia	Slovenia	Kosovo	Turkey	Estonia
1	Netherlands	10	10	0	0	48	3	+45	30	Final tournament	—	2–0	4–1	6–0	3–0	7–0
2	Russia	10	8	0	2	23	6	+17	24	Play-offs	0–1	—	1–0	3–0	4–2	4–0
3	Slovenia	10	6	0	4	31	12	+19	18		2–4	0–1	—	5–0	3–1	2–0
4	Kosovo	10	3	1	6	6	29	−23	10		0–6	0–5	0–3	—	2–0	2–0
5	Turkey	10	1	2	7	9	28	−19	5		0–8	1–2	1–6	0–0	—	0–0
6	Estonia	10	0	1	9	1	40	−39	1		0–7	0–3	0–9	1–2	0–4	—

Source: UEFA

=== Group B ===
Pos	Team	Pld	W	D	L	GF	GA	GD	Pts	Qualification	Denmark	Italy	Bosnia and Herzegovina	Malta	Israel	Georgia
1	Denmark	10	9	1	0	48	1	+47	28	Final tournament	—	0–0	2–0	8–0	4–0	14–0
2	Italy	10	8	1	1	37	5	+32	25	Final tournament	1–3	—	2–0	5–0	12–0	6–0
3	Bosnia and Herzegovina	10	6	0	4	19	17	+2	18		0–4	0–5	—	2–0	1–0	7–1
4	Malta	10	3	1	6	11	30	−19	10		0–8	0–2	2–3	—	1–1	2–1
5	Israel	10	2	1	7	10	30	−20	7		0–3	2–3	1–3	0–2	—	4–0
6	Georgia	10	0	0	10	3	45	−42	0		0–2	0–1	0–3	0–4	1–2	—

Source: UEFA

=== Group C ===
Pos	Team	Pld	W	D	L	GF	GA	GD	Pts	Qualification	Norway		Wales	Belarus	Faroe Islands
1	Norway	6	6	0	0	34	1	+33	18	Final tournament	—	6–0	1–0	Canc.	Canc.
2	Northern Ireland	8	4	2	2	17	17	0	14 (Note: Ranked on head-to-head away goals: Northern Ireland 2; Wales 0.)	Play-offs	0–6	—	0–0	3–2	5–1
3	Wales	8	4	2	2	16	4	+12	14		0–1	2–2	—	3–0	4–0
4	Belarus	7	2	0	5	11	15	−4	6		1–7	0–1	0–1	—	6–0
5	Faroe Islands	7	0	0	7	1	42	−41	0		0–13	0–6	0–6	0–2	—

Source: UEFA

=== Group D ===
Pos	Team	Pld	W	D	L	GF	GA	GD	Pts	Qualification	Spain	Czech Republic	Poland	Moldova	Azerbaijan
1	Spain	8	7	1	0	48	1	+47	22	Final tournament	—	4–0	3–0	10–0	4–0
2	Czech Republic	8	5	1	2	24	9	+15	16	Play-offs	1–5	—	0–0	7–0	3–0
3	Poland	8	4	2	2	16	5	+11	14		0–0	0–2	—	5–0	3–0
4	Moldova	8	1	0	7	3	43	−40	3 (Note: Ranked on head-to-head goal difference: Moldova +1, Azerbaijan -1.)		0–9	0–7	0–3	—	3–1
5	Azerbaijan	8	1	0	7	2	35	−33	3		0–13	0–4	0–5	1–0	—

Source: UEFA

=== Group E ===
Pos	Team	Pld	W	D	L	GF	GA	GD	Pts	Qualification	Finland	Portugal	Scotland	Albania	Cyprus
1	Finland	8	7	1	0	24	2	+22	22	Final tournament	—	1–0	1–0	8–1	4–0
2	Portugal	8	6	1	1	10	2	+8	19	Play-offs	1–1	—	1–0	1–0	1–0
3	Scotland	8	4	0	4	26	5	+21	12		0–1	0–2	—	3–0	8–0
4	Albania	8	2	0	6	7	21	−14	6		0–3	0–1	0–5	—	4–0
5	Cyprus	8	0	0	8	0	37	−37	0		0–5	0–3	0–10	0–2	—

Source: UEFA

=== Group F ===
Pos	Team	Pld	W	D	L	GF	GA	GD	Pts	Qualification	Sweden	Iceland	Slovakia	Hungary	Latvia
1	Sweden	8	7	1	0	40	2	+38	22	Final tournament	—	2–0	7–0	8–0	7–0
2	Iceland	8	6	1	1	25	5	+20	19	Final tournament	1–1	—	1–0	4–1	9–0
3	Slovakia	8	3	1	4	7	19	−12	10		0–6	1–3	—	0–0	2–0
4	Hungary	8	2	1	5	11	20	−9	7		0–5	0–1	1–2	—	4–0
5	Latvia	8	0	0	8	2	39	−37	0		1–4	0–6	1–2	0–5	—

Source: UEFA

=== Group G ===
Pos	Team	Pld	W	D	L	GF	GA	GD	Pts	Qualification	France	Austria	Serbia	North Macedonia	Kazakhstan
1	France	8	7	1	0	44	0	+44	22	Final tournament	—	3–0	6–0	11–0	12–0
2	Austria	8	6	1	1	22	3	+19	19	Final tournament	0–0	—	1–0	3–0	9–0
3	Serbia	8	4	0	4	21	12	+9	12		0–2	0–1	—	8–1	4–1
4	North Macedonia	8	2	0	6	8	39	−31	6		0–7	0–3	0–6	—	4–1
5	Kazakhstan	8	0	0	8	2	43	−41	0		0–3	0–5	0–3	0–3	—

Source: UEFA

=== Group H ===
Pos	Team	Pld	W	D	L	GF	GA	GD	Pts	Qualification	Belgium	Switzerland	Romania	Croatia	Lithuania
1	Belgium	8	7	0	1	37	5	+32	21	Final tournament	—	4–0	6–1	6–1	6–0
2	Switzerland	8	6	1	1	20	6	+14	19	Play-offs	2–1	—	6–0	2–0	4–0
3	Romania	8	4	0	4	13	16	−3	12		0–1	0–2	—	4–1	3–0
4	Croatia	8	2	1	5	7	19	−12	7		1–4	1–1	0–1	—	1–0
5	Lithuania	8	0	0	8	1	32	−31	0		0–9	0–3	0–4	1–2	—

Source: UEFA

=== Group I ===
Pos	Team	Pld	W	D	L	GF	GA	GD	Pts	Qualification	Germany	Ukraine	Ireland	Greece	Montenegro
1	Germany	8	8	0	0	46	1	+45	24	Final tournament	—	8–0	3–0	6–0	10–0
2	Ukraine	8	5	0	3	16	21	−5	15	Play-offs	0–8	—	1–0	4–0	2–1
3	Republic of Ireland	8	4	1	3	11	10	+1	13		1–3	3–2	—	1–0	2–0
4	Greece	8	2	1	5	6	21	−15	7		0–5	0–4	1–1	—	1–0
5	Montenegro	8	0	0	8	2	28	−26	0		0–3	1–3	0–3	0–4	—

Source: UEFA

=== Ranking of second-placed teams ===
As groups A and B had six teams while the others had five, in order to determine the three best second-placed teams from the qualifying group stage which advance directly to the final tournament, only the results of the second-placed teams against the first, third, fourth and fifth-placed teams in their group are taken into account. As a result, eight matches played by each second-placed team are counted for the purposes of determining the ranking.

Pos	Grp	Team	Pld	W	D	L	GF	GA	GD	Pts	Qualification
1	B	Italy	8	6	1	1	30	5	+25	19	Final tournament
2	F	Iceland	8	6	1	1	25	5	+20	19	Final tournament
3	G	Austria	8	6	1	1	22	3	+19	19	Final tournament
4	H	Switzerland	8	6	1	1	20	6	+14	19	Play-offs
5	E	Portugal	8	6	1	1	10	2	+8	19	Play-offs
6	A	Russia	8	6	0	2	16	6	+10	18	Play-offs
7	D	Czech Republic	8	5	1	2	24	9	+15	16	Play-offs
8	I	Ukraine	8	5	0	3	16	21	−5	15	Play-offs
9	C	Northern Ireland	8	4	2	2	17	17	0	14	Play-offs

Source: UEFA
Rules for classification: 1) points; 2) goal difference; 3) goals scored; 4) away goals scored; 5) wins; 6) away wins; 7) disciplinary points; 8) coefficient ranking.

== Play-offs ==
=== Draw ===
The draw for the play-offs was held on 5 March 2021 (originally 25 September 2020, but had been postponed due to the COVID-19 pandemic), 12:00 CET (UTC+1), at the UEFA headquarters in Nyon, Switzerland. The six teams were drawn into three ties without any seeding, with the first team drawn in each tie to be the home team of the first leg. Based on political restrictions, Russia and Ukraine could not be drawn against each other.

=== Matches ===
The first legs were played on 9 April, and the second legs were held on 13 April 2021. Originally, the three play-off winners qualified for the final tournament. However following the Russian invasion of Ukraine, Russia were banned from the final tournament, and Portugal qualified in their place.

Team 1	Agg.	Team 2	1st leg	2nd leg
Ukraine	1–4	Northern Ireland	1–2	0–2
Portugal	0–1	Russia	0–1	0–0
Czech Republic	2–2 (2–3 p)	Switzerland	1–1	1–1 (a.e.t.)

== Qualified teams ==
The following 16 teams qualified for the final tournament.

Team	Qualified as	Qualified on	Previous appearances in Women's Euro^{1}
England	Hosts	3 December 2018	8 (1984, 1987, 1995, 2001, 2005, 2009, 2013, 2017)
Netherlands	Group A winners	23 October 2020	3 (2009, 2013, **2017**)
Denmark	Group B winners	27 October 2020	9 (1984, 1991, 1993, 1997, 2001, 2005, 2009, 2013, 2017)
Norway	Group C winners	27 October 2020	11 (**1987**, 1989, 1991, **1993**, 1995, 1997, 2001, 2005, 2009, 2013, 2017)
Spain	Group D winners	18 February 2021	3 (1997, 2013, 2017)
Finland	Group E winners	19 February 2021	3 (2005, 2009, 2013)
Sweden	Group F winners	27 October 2020	10 (**1984**, 1987, 1989, 1995, 1997, 2001, 2005, 2009, 2013, 2017)
France	Group G winners	27 November 2020	6 (1997, 2001, 2005, 2009, 2013, 2017)
Belgium	Group H winners	1 December 2020	1 (2017)
Germany	Group I winners	23 October 2020	10 (**1989**, **1991**, 1993, **1995**, **1997**, **2001**, **2005**, **2009**, **2013**, 2017)
Italy	1st best runners-up	24 February 2021	11 (1984, 1987, 1989, 1991, 1993, 1997, 2001, 2005, 2009, 2013, 2017)
Iceland	2nd best runner-up	1 December 2020	3 (2009, 2013, 2017)
Austria	3rd best runner-up	23 February 2021	1 (2017)
Switzerland	Play-off winners	13 April 2021	1 (2017)
Northern Ireland	Play-off winners	13 April 2021	0 (debut)
Portugal	Play-off lucky losers	2 May 2022	1 (2017)

^{1} Bold indicates champions for that year. Italic indicates hosts for that year.

1. Russia originally qualified as the play-off winner, but was removed and banned from FIFA and UEFA international matches after their country's invasion of Ukraine (28 February 2022). On 2 May, UEFA announced that Russian teams were banned from every European competition, and consequently Portugal, the play-off loser, took their place in the final tournament.

== Top goalscorers ==
There were 826 goals scored in 198 matches, for an average of 4.17 goals per match (as of 24 February 2021).

12 goals

- (Belgium) Tine De Caigny

10 goals

- (Finland) Linda Sällström
- (Netherlands) Sherida Spitse
- (Norway) Caroline Graham Hansen
- (Spain) Jennifer Hermoso

9 goals

- (Belgium) Tessa Wullaert
- (Denmark) Nadia Nadim
- (Italy) Cristiana Girelli
- (Netherlands) Vivianne Miedema

8 goals

- (Denmark) Pernille Harder
- (France) Marie-Antoinette Katoto
- (Netherlands) Daniëlle van de Donk
- (Slovenia) Lara Prašnikar
- (Spain) Esther González

7 goals

- (Austria) Nicole Billa
- (Bosnia and Herzegovina) Sofija Krajšumović
- (France) Eugénie Le Sommer
- (Netherlands) Katja Snoeijs
- (Slovenia) Mateja Zver

For full lists of goalscorers, see sections in each group:

- Group A
- Group B
- Group C
- Group D
- Group E
- Group F
- Group G
- Group H
- Group I

Source: UEFA
