= Marian Awad =

Israeli footballer (born 1996)

Marian Awad ماريان عوض
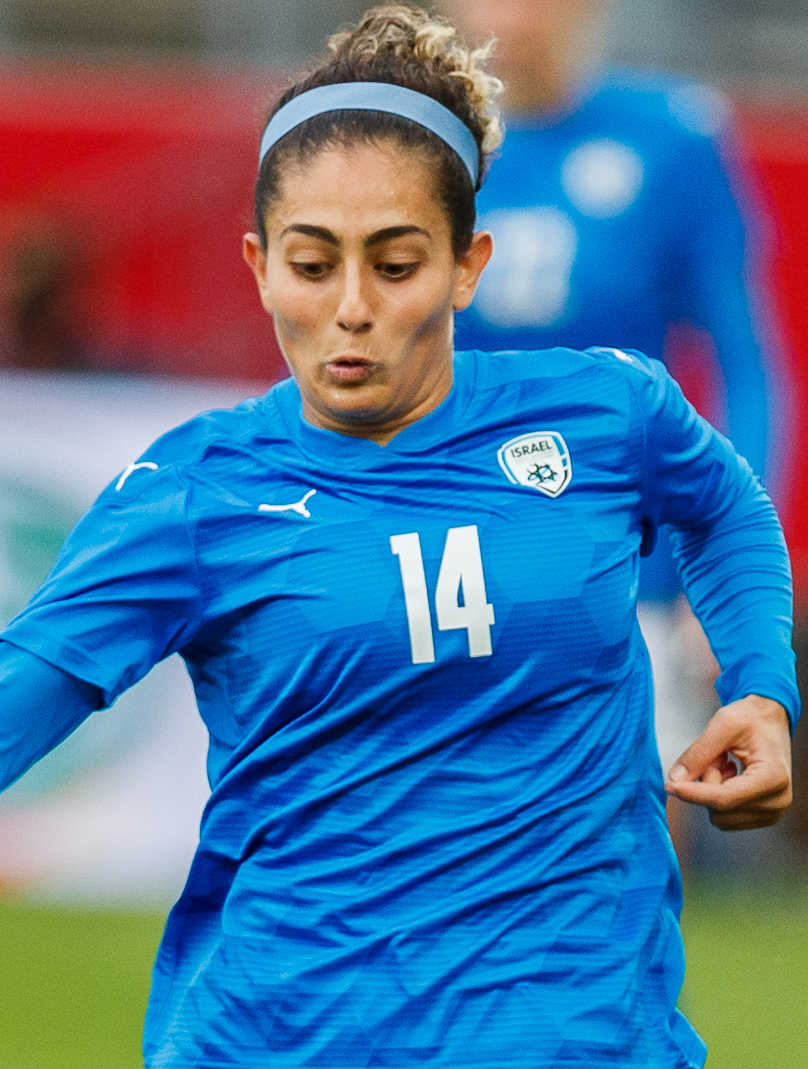
- Awad with Israel in 2021

Personal information
- Date of birth: 29 October 1996 (age 30)
- Place of birth: Haifa, Israel
- Position: Midfielder

Team information
- Current team: Kiryat Gat

College career
Years	Team	Apps	(Gls)
2015–2019	LIU Brooklyn Blackbirds		

Senior career*
Years	Team	Apps	(Gls)
2014–2015	Youth Academy		
2017	→ Maccabi Kishronot Hadera (loan)		
2019–2021	Maccabi Emek Hefer		
2021–2022	Villarreal B		
2022–2023	Maccabi Emek Hefer		
2023–2024	FOMGET	4	(1)
2024–2025	Hapoel Petah Tikva	6	(1)
2025–	Kiryat Gat	26	(6)

International career^{‡}
2010–2011	Israel U17	4	(0)
2011–2015	Israel U19	16	(5)
2017–	Israel	42	(5)
- * Club domestic league appearances and goals as of 11 October 2026 ‡ National team caps and goals as of 15 October 2026

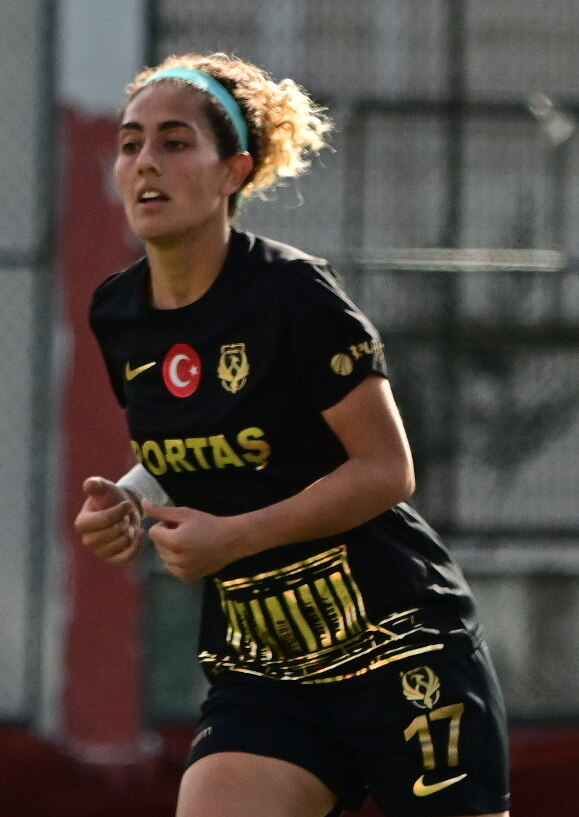
Marian Awad with FOMGET

Marian Awad (Arabic: ماريان عوض; Hebrew: מריאן עווד; born 29 October 1996) is an Israeli footballer who plays as a midfielder for Ligat Nashim club Kiryat Gat and the Israel women's national team.

== Early life ==
Awad was born in Haifa, Israel, and to an Arab-Israeli family.

== International career ==
Awad has been capped for the Israel national team, appearing for the senior squad during the 2019 FIFA Women's World Cup qualifiers.

== International goals ==
No.	Date	Venue	Opponent	Score	Result	Competition
1.	6 April 2017	LFF Stadium, Vilnius, Lithuania	Lithuania	1–0	2–0	2019 FIFA Women's World Cup qualifying
2.	29 August 2019	Ramat Gan Stadium, Ramat Gan, Israel	Italy	2–3	2–3	UEFA Women's Euro 2022 qualifying
3.	10 March 2020	Haberfeld Stadium, Rishon LeZion, Israel	Georgia	3–0	4–0	UEFA Women's Euro 2022 qualifying
4.	23 November 2023	Globall Football Park, Telki, Hungary	Kazakhstan	1–0	2–0	2023–24 UEFA Women's Nations League C
5.	21 February 2025	Stadion Aleksandar Shalamanov, Sofia, Bulgaria	Bulgaria	1–1	3–1	2025 UEFA Women's Nations League C
