= Stine Sandbech =

Danish footballer (born 1996)

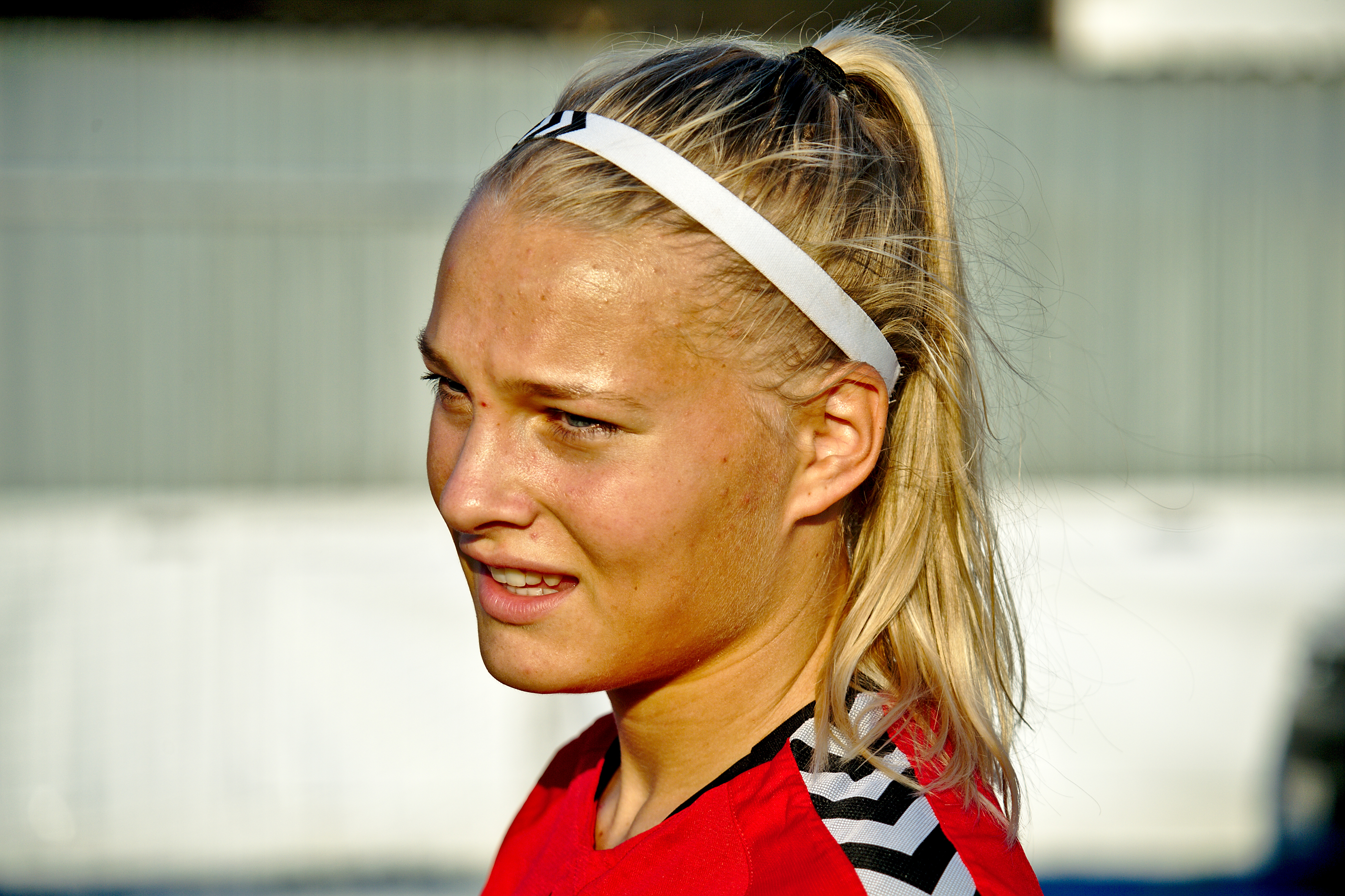
- Sandbech with the national team in July 2017

Personal information
- Date of birth: 24 January 1996 (age 30)
- Place of birth: Ejby, Denmark
- Height: 1.78 m (5 ft 10 in)
- Position: Defender

Team information
- Current team: BK Häcken
- Number: 12

Youth career
- Ejby IF 68
- Brøndby IF

Senior career*
Years	Team	Apps	(Gls)
2013–2019	Brøndby IF	79	(35)
2019–2020	FC Fleury 91	14	(4)
2020–2021	Aston Villa	17	(1)
2021–	BK Häcken	27	(7)

International career^{‡}
2012	Denmark U16	6	(0)
2012–2013	Denmark U17	10	(2)
2013–2015	Denmark U19	26	(2)
2015–	Denmark	80	(22)
Medal record
Women's football
Representing Denmark
UEFA Women's Championship
Silver medal – second place	2017 Netherlands	Team
- * Club domestic league appearances and goals as of 00:20, 12 September 2022 (UTC) ‡ National team caps and goals as of 23:00, 18 April 2026 (UTC)

Stine Sandbech (née Larsen; born 24 January 1996) is a Danish professional footballer who plays as a defender for Damallsvenskan club BK Häcken and the Denmark national team. Sandbech previously appeared for A-Liga club Brøndby, Première Ligue club Fleury, and Women's Super League side Aston Villa. Larsen started her career as a forward, but was converted to a defender for both her club and national teams starting in 2025.

== Club career ==
After joining Brøndby IF as a 12-year-old, Larsen progressed into the first team in 2013 and quickly became an important player. Team coach Per Nielsen praised her as a potential female Kim Vilfort.

On 30 July 2020, Larsen signed for newly promoted Aston Villa in the Women's Super League.

== International career ==
Larsen made her senior international debut for Denmark in January 2015, starting a 1–1 friendly draw with New Zealand in Belek, Turkey. Although she began her national team career as a defender, versatile Larsen was named as a forward for a UEFA European Championship 2017 qualifying Group 4 win over Slovakia in June 2016. Due to tournament-ending injuries to teammates Janni Arnth and Mie Leth Jans, Larsen was reverted to playing as a defender for the national team at the UEFA European Championship 2017 and has been a starter in the defence since.

== Personal life ==
She married her husband, Emil Sandbech, in July 2024. Their daughter was born in February 2024.

== Career statistics ==
=== International goals ===
Scores and results list Denmark's goal tally first.

#	Date	Venue	Opponent	Score	Result	Competition
1.	22 September 2015	Biel/Bienne, Switzerland	Switzerland	1–3	1–4	Friendly
2.	20 October 2016	Yongchuan, China	Uzbekistan	2–1	2–1	2016 Yongchuan International Tournament
3.	3 March 2017	Parchal, Portugal	Portugal	1–0	6–0	2017 Algarve Cup
4.	3 March 2017	Parchal, Portugal	Portugal	4–0	6–0	2017 Algarve Cup
5.	11 April 2017	Slagelse, Denmark	Finland	4–0	5–0	Friendly
6.	11 April 2017	Slagelse, Denmark	Finland	5–0	5–0	Friendly
7.	6 July 2017	Wiener Neustadt, Austria	Austria	2–4	2–4	Friendly
8.	29 August 2019	Viborg, Denmark	Malta	5–0	8–0	UEFA Women's Euro 2022 qualifying
9.	29 August 2019	Viborg, Denmark	Malta	8–0	8–0	UEFA Women's Euro 2022 qualifying
10.	12 November 2019	Viborg, Denmark	Georgia	2–0	14–0	UEFA Women's Euro 2022 qualifying
11.	12 November 2019	Viborg, Denmark	Georgia	3–0	14–0	UEFA Women's Euro 2022 qualifying
12.	12 November 2019	Viborg, Denmark	Georgia	11–0	14–0	UEFA Women's Euro 2022 qualifying
13.	22 September 2020	Ta'Qali, Malta	Malta	1–0	8–0	UEFA Women's Euro 2022 qualifying
14.	16 September 2021	Viborg, Denmark	Malta	3–0	7–0	2023 FIFA Women's World Cup qualification
15.	21 September 2021	Baku, Azerbaijan	Azerbaijan	2–0	8–0	2023 FIFA Women's World Cup qualification
16.	21 September 2021	Baku, Azerbaijan	Azerbaijan	3–0	8–0	2023 FIFA Women's World Cup qualification
17.	21 September 2021	Baku, Azerbaijan	Azerbaijan	5–0	8–0	2023 FIFA Women's World Cup qualification
18.	26 October 2021	Podgorica, Montenegro	Montenegro	1–0	5–1	2023 FIFA Women's World Cup qualification
19.	26 October 2021	Podgorica, Montenegro	Montenegro	5–1	5–1	2023 FIFA Women's World Cup qualification
20.	12 April 2022	Viborg, Denmark	Azerbaijan	1–0	2–0	2023 FIFA Women's World Cup qualification
21.	7 April 2023	Malmö, Sweden	Sweden	1–0	1–0	Friendly

== Honours ==
Brøndby IF

- A-Liga: 2014–15, 2016–17
- Danish Cup: 2014, 2015, 2017

BK Häcken

- Damallsvenskan: 2025
- UEFA Women's Europa Cup: 2025–26

Denmark

- UEFA Women's Euro 2017: Runners-up

Individual

- 2015: Danish Breakthrough Player of the Year
- 2018: Elitedivisionen Player of the Year
