= 2015 Algarve Cup =

International women's football tournament

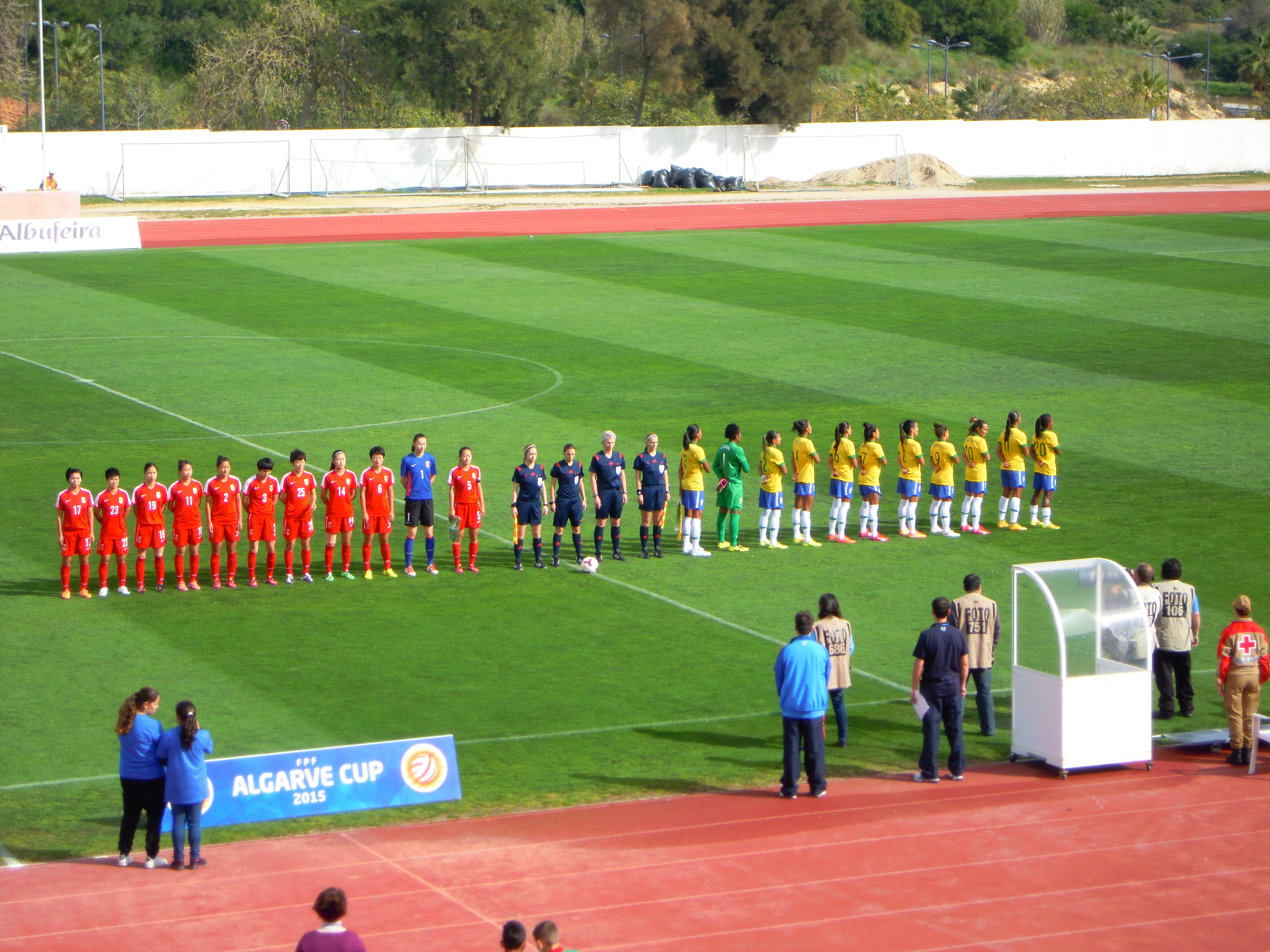

Tournament details
- Host country: Portugal
- Dates: 4–11 March
- Teams: 12 (from 4 confederations)
- Venue(s): 5 (in 5 host cities)

Final positions
- Champions: United States (10th title)
- Runners-up: France
- Third place: Germany
- Fourth place: Sweden

Tournament statistics
- Matches played: 24
- Goals scored: 75 (3.13 per match)
- Top scorer(s): (Sweden) Sofia Jakobsson (4 goals)

The 2015 Algarve Cup was the 22nd edition of the Algarve Cup, an invitational women's football tournament held annually in Portugal. It took place on 4–11 March.

== Format ==
Because of the number of competitive teams this year, the format was changed. Previously Group C teams were unable to get into the final, which was played between Group A and B winners. This year however, the final was played between the two best group winners.

Points awarded in the group stage followed the standard formula of three points for a win, one point for a draw and zero points for a loss. In the case of two teams being tied on the same number of points in a group, their head-to-head result determine the higher place.

== Teams ==
The participating teams were announced on 20 October 2014.

Team	FIFA Rankings (December 2014)
Germany	1
United States	2
France	3
Japan	4
Sweden	5
Brazil	8
Norway	12
China	13
Denmark	16
Switzerland	19
Iceland	20
Portugal (hosts)	42

== Match officials ==
The referees were announced on 20 February 2015.

Referees

- (Chile) María Carvajal
- (China) Qin Liang
- (Czech Republic) Jana Adámková
- (France) Stéphanie Frappart
- (Honduras) Melissa Borjas
- (Italy) Carina Vitulano
- (Jamaica) Cardella Samuels
- (Mexico) Lucila Montes
- (North Korea) Ri Hyang-ok
- (Romania) Cristina Dorcioman
- (Singapore) Abirami Naidu
- (Switzerland) Esther Staubli
- (Uruguay) Claudia Rodriguez
- (Zambia) Gladys Lengwe

Assistant referees

- (Australia) Sarah Ho
- (Belgium) Ella De Vries
- (Brazil) Janette Arcanjo
- (Chile) Loreto Cravero
- (China) Cui Yongmei
- (China) Liang Jianping
- (Croatia) Sanja Karšić
- (Czech Republic) Lucie Ratajová
- (France) Manuela Nicolosi
- (Greece) Chrysoula Kourompylia
- (Jamaica) Princess Brown
- (Jamaica) Stacy-Ann Greyson
- (Malawi) Bernadettar Kwimbira
- (Mexico) Enedina Gómez
- (Mexico) Lixy Guerrero
- (Malaysia) Widiya Habibah Shamsuri
- (North Korea) Hong Kum-nyo
- (Romania) Petruţa Iugulescu
- (South Korea) Kim Kyoung-min
- (Spain) Yolanda Rodriguez
- (Switzerland) Belinda Brem
- (Switzerland) Susanne Küng
- (Togo) Aywa Dzodope
- (Ukraine) Natalia Rachynska
- (Uruguay) Luciana Mascaraña
- (Uruguay) Mariana Odone

== Group stage ==
The groups were announced on 18 December 2014.

All times are local (UTC±00:00).

=== Tie-breaking criteria ===
For the group stage of this tournament, where two or more teams in a group tied on an equal number of points, the finishing positions will be determined by the following tie-breaking criteria in the following order:

1. number of points obtained in the matches among the teams in question
2. goal difference in all the group matches
3. number of goals scored in all the group matches
4. fair-play ranking in all the group matches
5. FIFA ranking

=== Group A ===
Team	Pld	W	D	L	GF	GA	GD	Pts
Sweden	3	2	0	1	7	4	+3	6
Germany	3	2	0	1	7	5	+2	6
Brazil	3	1	1	1	3	3	0	4
China	3	0	1	2	0	5	−5	1

4 March 2015
15:00

Brazil	0–0	China
	Report

Estádio Municipal, Albufeira
Referee: Stéphanie Frappart (France)
4 March 2015
16:00

Germany	2–4	Sweden
Marozsán 2'; Laudehr 3'	Report	Seger 30', 71'; Jakobsson 54', 84'

Estádio Municipal, Vila Real de Santo António
Attendance: 769
Referee: Carina Vitulano (Italy)

6 March 2015
13:00

Germany	2–0	China
Mittag 40'; Popp 76'	Report

Estádio Municipal, Vila Real de Santo António
Attendance: 502
Referee: Lucila Montes (Mexico)
6 March 2015
13:30

Sweden	0–2	Brazil
	Report	Marta 20'; Andressa 68' (pen.)

Municipal Stadium, Lagos
Referee: Qin Liang (China)

9 March 2015
17:30

Brazil	1–3	Germany
Bruna 47'	Report	Popp 39'; Šašić 49'; Marozsán 56'

Stadium Bela Vista, Parchal
Attendance: 769
Referee: Melissa Borjas (Honduras)
9 March 2015
17:30

Sweden	3–0	China
Asllani 4'; Schelin 33' (pen.); Jakobsson 40'	Report

Estádio Municipal, Vila Real de Santo António
Referee: María Carvajal (Chile)

=== Group B ===
Team	Pld	W	D	L	GF	GA	GD	Pts
United States	3	2	1	0	5	1	+4	7
Norway	3	1	1	1	4	4	0	4
Switzerland	3	1	1	1	4	5	−1	4
Iceland	3	0	1	2	0	3	−3	1

4 March 2015
15:00

Switzerland	2–0	Iceland
Dickenmann 57' (pen.), 66'	Report

Estádio Municipal, Lagos
Referee: Ri Hyang-ok (North Korea)
4 March 2015
19:00

Norway	1–2	United States
Hegerberg 43'	Report	Lloyd 56', 62'

Estádio Municipal, Vila Real de Santo António
Attendance: 500
Referee: Esther Staubli (Switzerland)

6 March 2015
17:00

United States	3–0	Switzerland
Morgan 55'; Rodriguez 72'; Wambach 81'	Report

Estádio Municipal, Vila Real de Santo António
Attendance: 500
Referee: Cristina Dorcioman (Romania)
6 March 2015
18:00

Norway	1–0	Iceland
Haavi 9'	Report

Estádio Municipal, Lagos
Referee: Gladys Lengwe (Zambia)

9 March 2015
17:30

United States	0–0	Iceland
	Report

Estádio Municipal, Lagos
Attendance: 500
Referee: Abirami Naidu (Singapore)
9 March 2015
17:30

Norway	2–2	Switzerland
Rønning 51'; Herlovsen 84'	Report	Kiwic 61'; Humm 62'

Estádio Municipal, Albufeira
Referee: Claudia Umpiérrez (Uruguay)

=== Group C ===
Team	Pld	W	D	L	GF	GA	GD	Pts
France	3	3	0	0	8	2	+6	9
Denmark	3	1	1	1	5	7	−2	4
Japan	3	1	0	2	5	5	0	3
Portugal	3	0	1	2	2	6	−4	1

4 March 2015
14:10

Japan	1–2	Denmark
Ando 17'	Report	S. Nielsen 2'; Rasmussen 58'

Stadium Bela Vista, Parchal
Attendance: 133
Referee: Claudia Umpiérrez (Uruguay)
4 March 2015
18:00

Portugal	0–1	France
	Report	Le Sommer 64'

Stadium Bela Vista, Parchal
Referee: María Carvajal (Chile)

6 March 2015
12:10

Japan	3–0	Portugal
Kawamura 36'; Yokoyama 54'; Sugasawa 79'	Report

Stadium Bela Vista, Parchal
Referee: Melissa Borjas (Honduras)
6 March 2015
15:00

France	4–1	Denmark
Le Sommer 2'; Abily 6'; Dali 13'; Lavogez 43'	Report	S. Nielsen 76'

Stadium Bela Vista, Parchal
Attendance: 45
Referee: Jana Adámková (Czech Republic)

9 March 2015
14:10

Japan	1–3	France
Kawasumi 43'	Report	Thiney 52' (pen.), 85'; Le Sommer 70'

Stadium Bela Vista, Parchal
Referee: Carina Vitulano (Italy)
9 March 2015
14:10

Portugal	2–2	Denmark
Silva 77' (pen.); Neto 87'	Report	S. Nielsen 54'; Rask 71'

Estádio Municipal, Vila Real de Santo António
Referee: Ri Hyang-ok (North Korea)

=== Ranking of teams for placement matches ===
The ranking of the 1st, 2nd, 3rd, and 4th placed teams in each group to determine the placement matches:

Pos	Grp	Team	Pld	W	D	L	GF	GA	GD	Pts	Qualification
1	C	France	3	3	0	0	8	2	+6	9	Final
2	B	United States	3	2	1	0	5	1	+4	7	Final
3	A	Sweden	3	2	0	1	7	4	+3	6	Third-place match

Pos	Grp	Team	Pld	W	D	L	GF	GA	GD	Pts	Qualification
1	A	Germany	3	2	0	1	7	5	+2	6	Third-place match
2	B	Norway	3	1	1	1	4	4	0	4	Fifth-place match
3	C	Denmark	3	1	1	1	5	7	−2	4	Fifth-place match

Pos	Grp	Team	Pld	W	D	L	GF	GA	GD	Pts	Qualification
1	A	Brazil	3	1	1	1	3	3	0	4	Seventh-place match
2	B	Switzerland	3	1	1	1	4	5	−1	4	Seventh-place match
3	C	Japan	3	1	0	2	5	5	0	3	Ninth-place match

Pos	Grp	Team	Pld	W	D	L	GF	GA	GD	Pts	Qualification
1	B	Iceland	3	0	1	2	0	3	−3	1	Ninth-place match
2	C	Portugal	3	0	1	2	2	6	−4	1	Eleventh-place match
3	A	China	3	0	1	2	0	5	−5	1	Eleventh-place match

== Placement matches ==
=== Eleventh-place match ===
11 March 2015
15:00

Portugal	3–3	China
Rodrigues 29'; Luís 38'; Silva 89' (pen.)	Report	Xu Yanlu 3'; Wang Shanshan 27'; Gu Yasha 69'
Penalties
	8–7

Stadium Bela Vista, Parchal
Referee: Abirami Naidu (Singapore)

=== Ninth-place match ===
11 March 2015
12:15

Japan	2–0	Iceland
Miyama 47', 59'	Report

Estádio Algarve, Faro
Referee: Gladys Lengwe (Zambia)

=== Seventh-place match ===
11 March 2015
15:00

Brazil	4–1	Switzerland
Marta 30', 77'; Bia 37'; Andressa 82'	Report	Wälti 45'

Estádio Municipal, Albufeira
Referee: Jana Adámková (Czech Republic)

=== Fifth-place match ===
11 March 2015
18:00

Norway	5–2	Denmark
Gulbrandsen 7', 34', 44'; Wold 65'; Bjånesøy 71'	Report	Harder 60', 73'

Estádio Municipal, Albufeira
Referee: Lucila Montes (Mexico)

=== Third-place match ===
11 March 2015
12:00

Sweden	1–2	Germany
Jakobsson 64'	Report	Mittag 3'; Popp 52'

Stadium Bela Vista, Parchal
Attendance: 813
Referee: Qin Liang (China)

=== Final ===
11 March 2015
16:00

France	0–2	United States
	Report	Johnston 7'; Press 41'

Estádio Algarve, Faro
Referee: Cristina Dorcioman (Romania)

== Final standings ==
Rank	Team
1st place, gold medalist(s)	United States
2nd place, silver medalist(s)	France
3rd place, bronze medalist(s)	Germany
4	Sweden
5	Norway
6	Denmark
7	Brazil
8	Switzerland
9	Japan
10	Iceland
11	Portugal
12	China

== Goalscorers ==
4 goals

- (Sweden) Sofia Jakobsson

3 goals

- (Brazil) Marta
- (Denmark) Sanne Troelsgaard Nielsen
- (France) Eugénie Le Sommer
- (Germany) Alexandra Popp
- (Norway) Solveig Gulbrandsen

2 goals

- (Brazil) Andressa
- (Denmark) Pernille Harder
- (France) Gaëtane Thiney
- (Germany) Dzsenifer Marozsán
- (Germany) Anja Mittag
- (Japan) Kozue Ando
- (Portugal) Dolores Silva
- (Sweden) Caroline Seger
- (Switzerland) Lara Dickenmann
- (United States) Carli Lloyd

1 goal

- (Brazil) Bia
- (Brazil) Bruna
- (China) Gu Yasha
- (China) Wang Shanshan
- (China) Xu Yanlu
- (Denmark) Caroline Rask
- (Denmark) Johanna Rasmussen
- (France) Camille Abily
- (France) Kenza Dali
- (France) Claire Lavogez
- (Germany) Simone Laudehr
- (Germany) Célia Šašić
- (Japan) Yuri Kawamura
- (Japan) Nahomi Kawasumi
- (Japan) Aya Miyama
- (Japan) Yuika Sugasawa
- (Japan) Kumi Yokoyama
- (Norway) Melissa Bjånesøy
- (Norway) Emilie Haavi
- (Norway) Ada Hegerberg
- (Norway) Isabell Herlovsen
- (Norway) Ingrid Moe Wold
- (Norway) Trine Bjerke Rønning
- (Portugal) Laura Luís
- (Portugal) Cláudia Neto
- (Portugal) Filipa Rodrigues
- (Sweden) Kosovare Asllani
- (Sweden) Lotta Schelin
- (Switzerland) Fabienne Humm
- (Switzerland) Rahel Kiwic
- (Switzerland) Lia Wälti
- (United States) Julie Johnston
- (United States) Alex Morgan
- (United States) Christen Press
- (United States) Amy Rodriguez
- (United States) Abby Wambach
