= Nicoline Sørensen =

Danish footballer (born 1997)

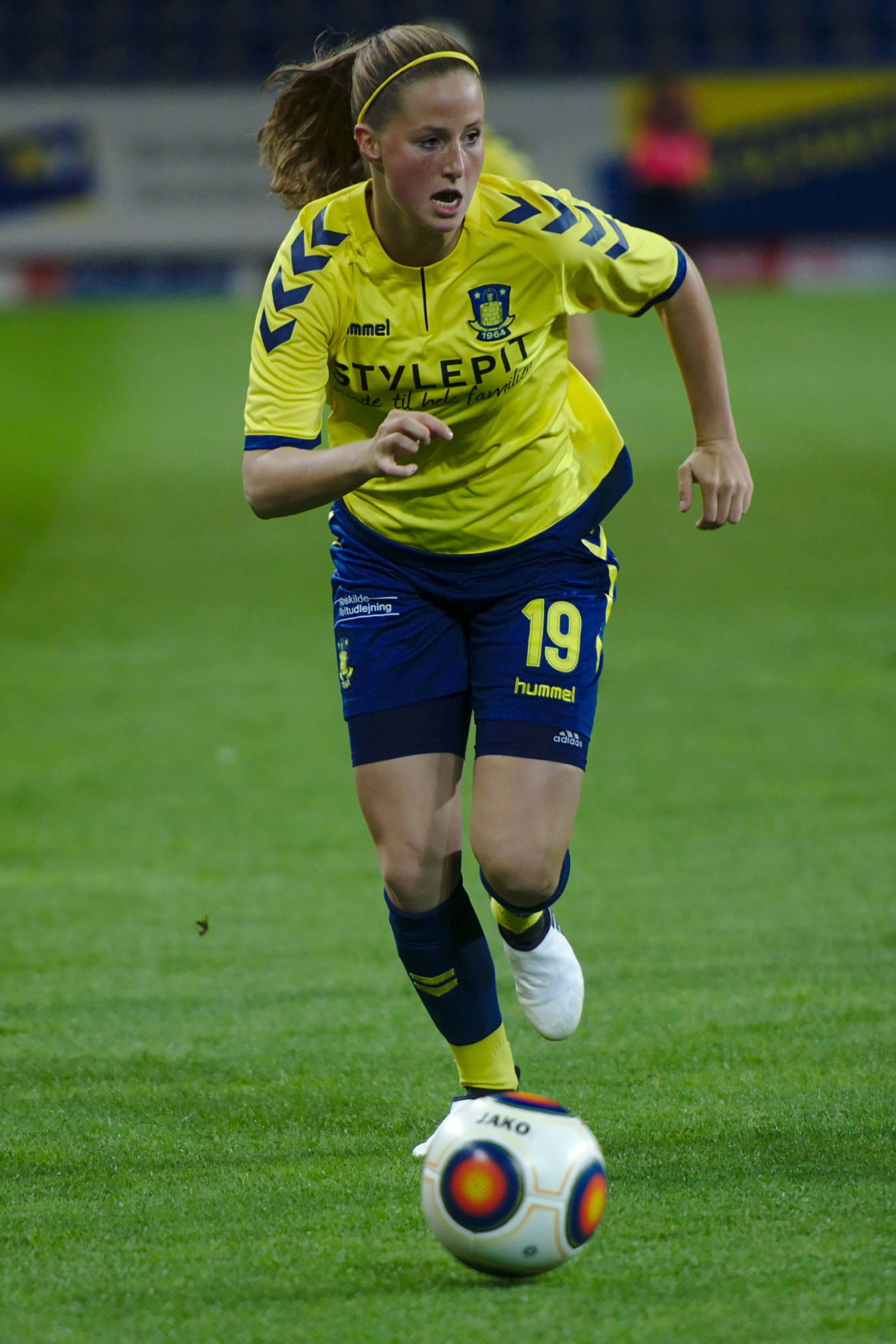
- Sørensen with Brøndby in 2016

Personal information
- Full name: Nicoline Haugård Caspersen
- Date of birth: 15 August 1997 (age 29)
- Place of birth: Måløv, Denmark
- Height: 1.79 m (5 ft 10 in)
- Position: Forward

Youth career
- –2007: Måløv BK
- 2007–2013: BSF

Senior career*
Years	Team	Apps	(Gls)
2013–2014	FC Rosengård	10	(0)
2015–2017	Brøndby	57	(19)
2017–2018	Linköpings FC	22	(3)
2018–2020	Brøndby	42	(29)
2020–2023	Everton	49	(4)

International career
2012–2013	Denmark U16	9	(3)
2012–2013	Denmark U17	18	(4)
2014–2016	Denmark U19	31	(11)
2016	Denmark U23	1	(0)
2016–2023	Denmark	54	(8)
Medal record
Women's football
Representing Denmark
UEFA Women's Championship
Silver medal – second place	2017 Netherlands	Team
- * Club domestic league appearances and goals

Nicoline Haugård Caspersen (née Sørensen; born 15 August 1997) is a Danish former professional footballer who played as a forward, most recently for English Women's Super League club Everton and the Denmark women's national team. Having made her debut for the senior national team at the age of 19, she was awarded the Danish Football Association's prize for Talent of the Year 2016.

== Club career ==
In August 2013, Sørensen joined Swedish club FC Rosengård. She was awarded a professional contract ahead of the 2014 season and went on to make ten Damallsvenskan appearances in the club's title-winning campaign. In February 2015, Sørensen returned to Denmark to play for Brøndby IF for more playing time and to catch up with her studies. In July 2017, it was announced that Sørensen would be making her return to Damallsvenskan to play for the reigning champions, Linköpings FC.

In July 2020, she left Brøndby to move to England, signing a two-year contract with Everton F.C. in the Women's Super League.

Despite having signed another one-year contract extension in the summer of 2023, Everton announced on 19 November 2023 that Sørensen would retire from football the following month, aged 26, to "pursue other interests". Her final game was a home 4–1 defeat to Manchester City on 19 December 2023, the Blues' final game before the WSL winter break.

== International career ==
After showing impressive form with Brøndby, Sørensen was called up to be part of the senior Danish national team for the 2016 Yongchuan International Tournament of China in October 2016. She was a replacement for the injured Nadia Nadim. In 2017, she was named to the Danish UEFA Women's Euro 2017 squad.

== Personal life ==
She is currently enrolled as a remote student at the Technical University of Denmark, completing a degree in innovation engineering. She speaks four languages: Danish, Swedish, English, and Norwegian.

== International goals ==
No.	Date	Venue	Opponent	Score	Result	Competition
1.	29 August 2019	Viborg Stadium, Viborg, Denmark	Malta	7–0	8–0	UEFA Women's Euro 2022 qualifying
2.	8 October 2019	Mikheil Meskhi Stadium, Tbilisi, Georgia	Georgia	2–0	2–0	UEFA Women's Euro 2022 qualifying
3.	8 April 2021	Tallaght Stadium, Dublin, Ireland	Republic of Ireland	1–0	1–0	Friendly

== Honours ==
=== Club ===
Brøndby IF

- Elitedivisionen:
  - Winner: 2014–15, 2016–17

FC Rosengård

Winner

- Damallsvenskan: 2014

Linköpings FC

- Damallsvenskan
  - Winner: 2017
