= Caroline Rask =

Danish footballer (born 1994)

Personal information
- Full name: Caroline Rask
- Date of birth: 25 May 1994 (age 32)
- Place of birth: Aars, Denmark
- Height: 1.65 m (5 ft 5 in)
- Position: Midfielder

Team information
- Current team: PSV
- Number: 18

Senior career*
Years	Team	Apps	(Gls)
2011–2020	Fortuna Hjørring	60	(1)
2020–2021	AC Milan	10	(0)
2021–2023	PSV	21	(0)

International career^{‡}
2009–2011	Denmark U-17	13	(1)
2011–2013	Denmark U-19	25	(4)
2013–2017	Denmark U-23	2	(0)
2012–	Denmark	8	(1)
- * Club domestic league appearances and goals as of 3 March 2021 ‡ National team caps and goals as of 22 October 2020

Caroline Rask (born 25 May 1994) is a Danish footballer who plays as a midfielder. She most recently played for PSV and formerly with AC Milan and Fortuna Hjørring,. Rask has also represented the Denmark national team. She joined Fortuna Hjørring in 2011 and made her senior international debut as a substitute for Pernille Harder in Denmark's 2–2 tie with Portugal during the 2015 Algarve Cup – during which she also scored her first international goal.

== Honours ==
Fortuna Hjørring

- Elitedivisionen: 2013–14, 2015–16, 2017–18, 2019–20
- Danish Women's Cup: 2016, 2019
