= Keren Goor =

Israeli footballer

Personal information
- Date of birth: 28 July 1998 (age 28)
- Place of birth: Hollywood, Florida, United States
- Height: 1.63 m (5 ft 4 in)
- Position: Midfielder

Youth career
- 2009–2013: Hapoel Ra'anana
- 2012–2014: Youth Academy

College career
Years	Team	Apps	(Gls)
2019–2022	Santa Clara Broncos	71	(3)

Senior career*
Years	Team	Apps	(Gls)
2014–2017	Youth Academy	62	(18)
2017–2018	Hapoel Ra'anana	19	(5)

International career^{‡}
2013–2014	Israel U17	9	(1)
2014–2016	Israel U19	17	(0)
2017–2022	Israel	9	(1)
- * Club domestic league appearances and goals as of 30 August 2019 ‡ National team caps and goals as of 29 November 2021

Keren Goor (or Karen, Hebrew: קרן גור; born 28 July 1998) is a footballer who plays as a midfielder. Born in the United States, she played for the Israel women's national team.

== Early life ==
Goor was born in Hollywood, Florida and raised in Ra'anana, Israel.

== Career ==
Goor has been capped for the Israel national team, appearing for the team during the 2019 FIFA Women's World Cup qualifying cycle.

== Honours ==
Santa Clara Broncos

- NCAA Division I Women's Soccer Championship: 2020
