= Lia Barkai =

Israeli footballer

Lia Barkai ליה ברקאי
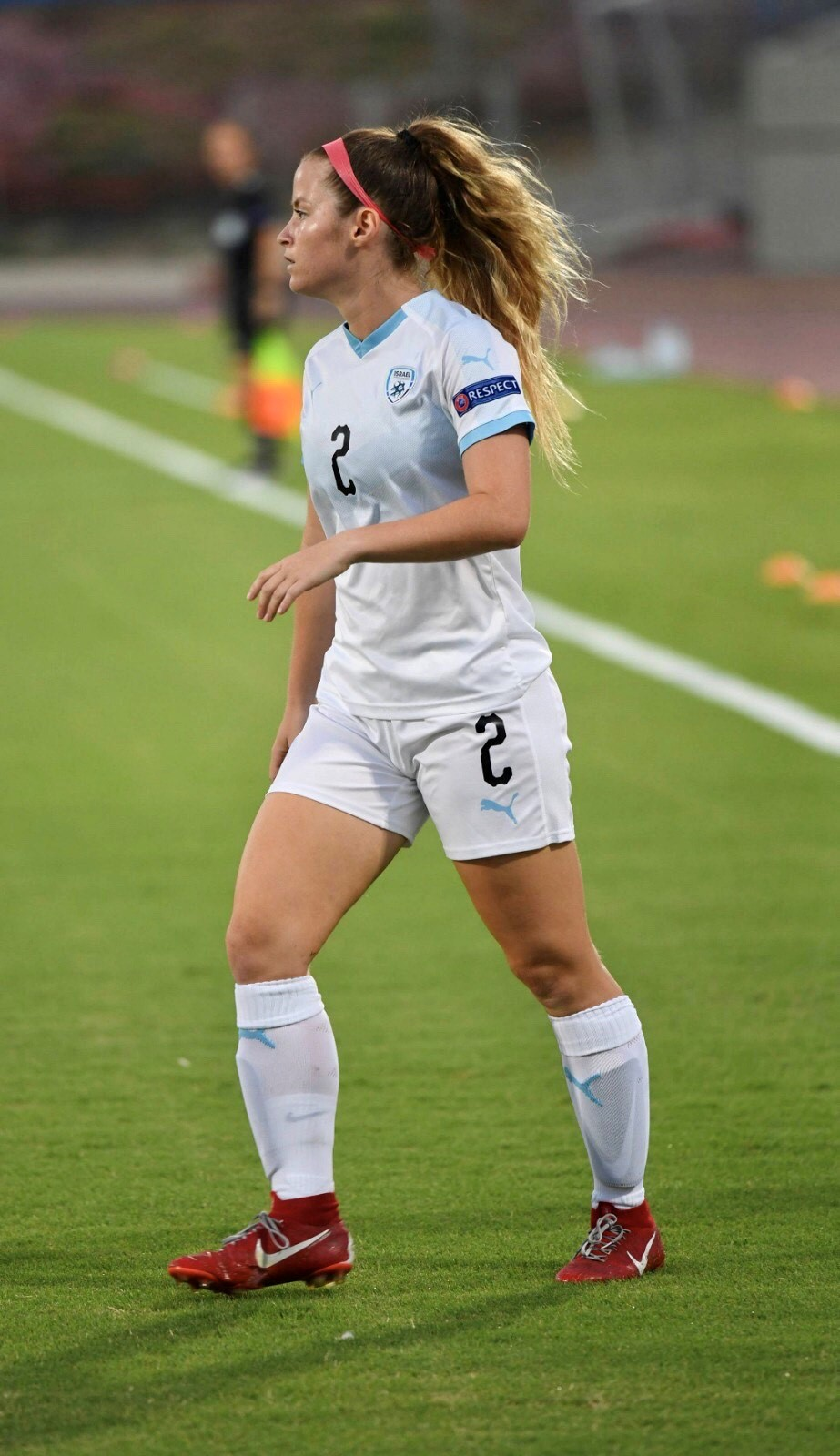
- Photo: Haim Zach / GPO

Personal information
- Full name: Lia Gal Barkai
- Date of birth: 5 April 1999 (age 27)
- Place of birth: Israel
- Position: Defender

Team information
- Current team: ASA Tel Aviv

Senior career*
Years	Team	Apps	(Gls)
- ASA Tel Aviv

International career^{‡}
2014–2015	Israel U17	9	(0)
2016–2018	Israel U19	9	(0)
2017–2020	Israel	9	(0)
- * Club domestic league appearances and goals as of 30 August 2019 ‡ National team caps and goals as of 27 November 2021

Lia Gal Barkai (Hebrew: ליה גל ברקאי; born 5 April 1999) is an Israeli footballer who plays as a defender and has appeared 9 times (till now) for the Israel women's national team.

== Career ==
Barkai started to play at the age of 8 for a boys' team in a township of Pardes Hanna, and after 3 years she moved to play for 2 famous local teams: Maccabi Kishronot Hadera and ASA Tel Aviv University. in 2015, at the age of 16, she accepted to the Wingate Institute in Israel. As a student, she played for the College Women Football Team, known in Israel as "The Academia" in the premier Israeli League. When she finished her studies at the "Academia", she started her mandatory service in the army. As she was recognized as an "excellence sport-person" (an official definition for several sport-persons that let them combine their service with the ongoing career) she continued to play for the ASA Tel Aviv University team. She became famous when the army refused to let her join the National Israeli Women team to the European Championship campaign in Spain, but the army regretted a day before the game, after the story got published in the Israeli media. She joined the team but was sitting on the bench during the match Vs. Spain. She continued and still is to play for 3 Israeli teams. Barkai has been capped for the Israel national team, appearing for the team during the 2019 FIFA Women's World Cup qualifying cycle.

== Club's Honors and awards ==
- 2018-2019 - Israeli Championship with Asa Tel Aviv team.
- 2018-2019 - The IFA Cup with Asa Tel Aviv team.
- 2019-2020 - Israeli Championship with M.C. Ramat Ha'Sharon.

== International Record ==
- 3 appears for the Israel National Team Under 16.
- 9 appears for the Israel National Team Under 17.
- 9 appears for the Israel National Team Under 19 - all of them as the Captain.
- 10 appears for the Israel National Team.
- 5 appears for 2 local teams in the European Champions League.
