= List of Malta women's international footballers =

This is a non-exhaustive list of Malta women's international footballers – association football players who have appeared at least once for the senior Malta women's national football team.

== Players ==
Updated as of 9 August 2025.

Key
**Bold**	Named to the national team in the past year

Name	Caps	Goals	National team years	Club(s)	Ref.
**Leah Ayres**	5	0		(Malta) Hibernians	
Maria Azzopardi	5+	0+	2009–2011		
**Rebecca Bajada**	19	0		(Malta) Mġarr United	
**Jana Barbara**	2	0		(Germany) FC Schalke 04	
Oriana Bedingfield	1+	0+	2011		
Chantal Bondin	5+	0+	2009–2010		
**Brenda Borg**	79	5	2013–	(Malta) Mġarr United	
Martina Borg	16+	1+	2014–2023	(Italy) Torres	
**Haley Bugeja**	40	24	2020–	(Italy) Sassuolo, (United States) Orlando Pride, (Italy) Inter Milan	
Nicole Buttigieg	7+	1+	2013–2014		
**Fiona Buttigieg**	4	0	2025-	(England) Luton Town	
**Simone Buttigieg**	4	0	2019–	(Malta) Kirkop United	
**Maya Cachia**	3	0		(Malta) Hibernians	
**Abigail Camilleri**	1	0		(Malta) Mġarr United	
Catherine Camilleri	6+	0+	2009–2010		
**Ylenia Carabott**	97	20	2007–	(Malta) Hibernians, (Malta) Birkirkara, (Italy) ChievoVerona, (Belgium) Sporting Charleroi, (England) Keynsham Town, (England) Gillingham, (England) London Seaward	
**Mariah Cardona**	1	0		(Malta) Birkirkara	
**Yulya Carella**	5	0		(Malta) Mġarr United	
Sarah Caruana					
Kayleigh Chetcuti	3+	0+	2020–2021	(Malta) Swieqi United	
Francesca Chircop	4+	0+	2014–2022	(Malta) Hibernians	
Rebecca Chircop					
Antoinette Cini					
**Raisa Costantino**	1	0		(Italy) SPD Tharros	
Sharon Costantino					
**Rachel Cuschieri**	107	15		(Malta) Birkirkara, (Cyprus) Apollon Limassol, (Belgium) RSC Anderlecht, (Netherlands) PSV, (Italy) Lazio, (Italy) Sampdoria, (Italy) Genoa	
Rebecca D'Agostino					
**Giulia D'Antuono**	2	0		(Malta) Mġarr United	
**Maia Debono**	3	0		(Malta) Mġarr United	
Mandy Debono					
Keoney Demicoli					
**Jessica Dimech**	8	0		(Malta) Hibernians	
Tonina Dimech				(Malta) Birkirkara	
**Patricia Ebejer**	12	0		(Malta) Mġarr United	
**Lexine Farrugia**	6	0		(Italy) Roma	
**Maria Farrugia**	55	11		(England) Sunderland, (England) Durham, (England) Lewes, (England) Sheffield United, (England) Bristol City	
Sonia Farrugia					
**Stefania Farrugia**	103	5	2013-	(Malta) Birkirkara	
Kirsty Feasey					
**Jade Flask**	67	7	2014-	(Malta) Hibernians, (Sweden) Ånge IF, (Malta) Swieqi United	
**Alexandra Gatt**	2	0		(England) Durham Cestria	
Raina Giusti				(Malta) Birkirkara	
**Oceane Grange**	5	0		(France) RC Roubaix Wervicq	
**Amber Grech**	10	0		(Malta) Hibernians	
Marisa Harvey					
**Emma Lipman**	41	1		(Italy) Roma, (Italy) Florentia, (Italy) Lazio, (Italy) Como, (Italy) Genoa	
**Maya Lucia**	13	0	2021-	(Malta) Lija Athletic, (Italy) Genoa, (Croatia) ŽNK Split, (Croatia) ŽNK Osijek, (Poland) AP Orlen Gdańsk	
Roxanne Micallef					
**Veronique Mifsud**	11	0	2019-	(Malta) Birkirkara, (Malta) Mġarr United	
Kelly Pace					
Natasha Pace					
Kimberly Parnis				(Malta) Birkirkara	
**Valentina Rapa**	7	0		(Malta) Swieqi United	
**Ann-Marie Said**	52	0		(Malta) Birkirkara, (Malta) Mġarr United	
Kathleen Saliba					
Sara Saliba	1	0	2024-	(Italy) AC Milan	
Jade Schembri	1	0	2024-	(Malta) Swieqi United	
**Nicole Sciberras**	52	0	2019-	(Italy) Juventus, (Italy) Tavagnacco, (Malta) Hibernians	
**Alishia Sultana**	61	2	2014-	(Malta) Birkirkara	
Dorianne Theuma	23+	4+		(Malta) Swieqi United	
Dionne Tonna					
Jasmine Turner					
Corissa Vella					
Yasmeen Vella					
**Kailey Willis**	22	3	2021-	(Italy) Hellas Verona, (Italy) Chievo, (Italy) Meran, (Italy) Venezia,	
**Emma Xuereb**	84	4	2009-	(Malta) Gozo Women, (Malta) Mosta, (Malta) Raiders Luxol, (Malta) Hibernians, (Malta) Swieqi United	
**Janice Xuereb**	73	0		(Malta) Birkirkara	
**Gabriella Zahra**	60	1		(Malta) Birkirkara	
**Charlene Zammit**	105	2		(Malta) Swieqi United, (Malta) Birkirkara	
**Shona Zammit**	88	7	2014-	(Malta) Hibernians, (Italy) Bari, (Malta) Swieqi United	

== See also ==
- Malta women's national football team
