= 2022 Malta International Women's Football Tournament squads =

2nd edition of the Malta International Women's Football Tournament

This article lists the squads for the 2022 Malta International Women's Football Tournament, the second edition of the Malta International Women's Football Tournament. The cup consisted of a series of friendly games, and was held in Malta from 16 to 22 February 2022. The three national teams involved in the tournament registered a squad of 23 players.

The age listed for each player is on 16 February 2022, the first day of the tournament. The numbers of caps and goals listed for each player do not include any matches played after the start of tournament. The club listed is the club for which the player last played a competitive match prior to the tournament. The nationality for each club reflects the national association (not the league) to which the club is affiliated. A flag is included for coaches that are of a different nationality than their own national team.

== Squads ==
=== Malta ===
Coach: Mark Gatt

The 22-player squad was announced on 11 February 2022. For the first match, Martina Borg was added to the squad in place of Emma Lipman who was unavailable for selection, and Lipman returned for the second match.

No.	Pos.	Player	Date of birth (age)	Caps	Goals	Club
1	GK	Patricia Ebejer	23 February 2000 (aged 21)			(Malta) Mġarr United
2	DF	Leanne Cefai	22 February 2000 (aged 21)			(Malta) Mġarr United
3	MF	Ann-Marie Said	2 July 1994 (aged 27)			(Malta) Birkirkara
4	DF	Jade Schembri	8 May 1999 (aged 22)			(Malta) Swieqi United
5	DF	Stefania Farrugia	11 September 1991 (aged 30)			(Malta) Birkirkara
6	MF	Dorianne Theuma	17 May 1984 (aged 37)			(Malta) Swieqi United
7	FW	Ylenia Carabott	2 March 1989 (aged 32)			(England) Keynsham Town
8	MF	Rachel Cuschieri	26 April 1992 (aged 29)			(Italy) Lazio
9	DF	Alishia Sultana	9 April 1997 (aged 24)			(Malta) Birkirkara
10	FW	Francesca Chircop	20 October 1993 (aged 28)			(Malta) Mġarr United
11	MF	Emma Lipman	23 February 1989 (aged 32)			(Italy) Como
11	MF	Martina Borg	24 October 1996 (aged 25)			(Italy) Roma CF
13	MF	Maria Farrugia	9 January 2001 (aged 21)			(England) Sunderland
14	MF	Shona Zammit	15 June 1996 (aged 25)			(Malta) Swieqi United
15	DF	Jade Flask	4 August 1996 (aged 25)			(Malta) Swieqi United
16	DF	Charlene Zammit	18 January 1991 (aged 31)			(Malta) Birkirkara
17	FW	Brenda Borg	1 May 1997 (aged 24)			(Malta) Mġarr United
18	MF	Emma Xuerreb	5 January 1992 (aged 30)			(Malta) Swieqi United
19	DF	Maia Debono	7 November 2001 (aged 20)			(Malta) Mġarr United
20	DF	Nicole Sciberras	28 April 2001 (aged 20)			(Italy) Tavagnacco
21	FW	Haley Bugeja	5 May 2004 (aged 17)			(Italy) Sassuolo
22	DF	Jessica Dimech	22 June 2002 (aged 19)			(Malta) Swieqi United
23	GK	Maya Cachia	23 December 2004 (aged 17)			(Italy) Crotone

=== Moldova ===
Coach: Eduard Blănuță

The 18-player squad was announced on 4 February 2022. On 15 February 2022, Dumitriţa Prisăcari and Alexandra Trofimov withdrew for health reasons and were replaced by Doina Ciobanu and Alina Chirica.

No.	Pos.	Player	Date of birth (age)	Caps	Goals	Club
1	GK	Evghenia Dumic	28 January 2003 (aged 19)			(Moldova) Legia Tiraspol
4	DF	Eugenia Railean	27 November 2004 (aged 17)			(Moldova) Agarista-ȘS Anenii Noi
5	MF	Stela-Aleina Tez	22 July 2003 (aged 18)			(Moldova) Real Succes Chișinău
6	DF	Mihaela Burdeniuc	18 April 2003 (aged 18)			(Moldova) Belceanka Bălți
7	MF	Carina Doiban	4 July 2002 (aged 19)			(Moldova) Noroc Nimoreni
9	MF	Daniela Mardari	2 June 2001 (aged 20)			(Italy) Crotone
10	FW	Carolina Ţabur	28 December 1998 (aged 23)			(Romania) U Olimpia Cluj
11	MF	Claudia Chiper	16 June 1995 (aged 26)			(Italy) Apulia Trani
12	GK	Natalia Munteanu	1 December 1993 (aged 28)			(Ukraine) Arsenal Kharkiv
13	DF	Violeta Miţul	3 April 1997 (aged 24)			(Italy) Apulia Trani
14	DF	Doina Ciobanu	12 February 1993 (aged 29)			(Moldova) Maksimum Cahul
16	MF	Alina Chirica	9 April 2004 (aged 17)			(Moldova) Agarista-ȘS Anenii Noi
16	DF	Felicia Guțu	31 August 2005 (aged 16)			(Moldova) Belceanka Bălți
17	MF	Nadejda Colesnicenco	28 June 1996 (aged 25)			(Italy) Apulia Trani
18	DF	Andreea Costin	22 August 2002 (aged 19)			(Moldova) Noroc Nimoreni
19	DF	Anastasia Sivolobova	14 August 1998 (aged 23)			(Cyprus) Aris Limassol
20	FW	Veronica Cojuhari	3 October 1998 (aged 23)			(Ukraine) Shakhtar Donetsk
21	MF	Irina Topal	19 December 1998 (aged 23)			(Ukraine) Kryvbas Kryvyi Rih

=== Morocco ===
Coach: (France) Reynald Pedros

The 23-player squad was announced on 17 February 2022.

No.	Pos.	Player	Date of birth (age)	Caps	Goals	Club
1	GK	Khadija Er-Rmichi	16 September 1989 (aged 32)			(Morocco) ASFAR
2	DF	Zineb Redouani	12 June 2000 (aged 21)			(Morocco) ASFAR
3	MF	Fatima Zahra Dahmos	5 August 1992 (aged 29)			(Morocco) ASFAR
4	DF	Siham Boukhami	1 February 1992 (aged 30)			(Morocco) ASFAR
5	DF	Nouhaila Benzina	11 May 1998 (aged 23)			(Morocco) ASFAR
6	MF	Élodie Nakkach	20 January 1995 (aged 27)			(Switzerland) Servette
7	FW	Ghizlane Chebbak	19 February 1991 (aged 30)			(Morocco) ASFAR
8	MF	Salma Amani	28 November 1989 (aged 32)			(France) Saint-Malo
9	FW	Ibtissam Jraïdi	9 December 1992 (aged 29)			(Morocco) ASFAR
10	MF	Najat Badri	19 May 1988 (aged 33)			(Morocco) ASFAR
11	DF	Samia Fikri	2 August 1999 (aged 22)			(France) Montauban
12	GK	Assia Zouhair	30 April 1991 (aged 30)			(Morocco) SCC Mohammédia
13	MF	Yasmin Mrabet	8 August 1999 (aged 22)			(Spain) Levante Las Planas
14	DF	Aziza Rabbah	4 July 1986 (aged 35)			(Morocco) ASFAR
15	DF	Ghizlane Chhiri	11 September 1994 (aged 27)			(Morocco) ASFAR
16	FW	Samya Hassani	3 January 2000 (aged 22)			(Belgium) Gent
17	FW	Hanane Aït El Haj	2 November 1994 (aged 27)			(Morocco) ASFAR
18	FW	Sanaâ Mssoudy	30 December 1999 (aged 22)			(Morocco) ASFAR
19	MF	Nour Imane Addi	10 June 1997 (aged 24)			(United States) South Alabama Jaguars
20	MF	Imane Saoud	6 June 2002 (aged 19)			(Switzerland) Basel
21	DF	Rania Salmi	14 October 1998 (aged 23)			(Morocco) Sporting Club Casablanca
22	GK	Hind Hasnaoui	13 September 1996 (aged 25)			(Morocco) ASFAR
23	FW	Rosella Ayane	16 March 1996 (aged 25)			(England) Tottenham Hotspur

== Player representation ==
=== By club ===
Clubs with 3 or more players represented are listed.

Players	Club
13	(Morocco) ASFAR
6	(Malta) Swieqi United
5	(Malta) Mġarr United
4	(Malta) Birkirkara
3	(Italy) Apulia Trani

=== By club nationality ===
Players	Clubs
15	Malta, Morocco
10	Italy
9	Moldova
3	England, Ukraine
2	France, Switzerland
1	Belgium, Cyprus, Romania, Spain, United States

=== By club federation ===
Players	Federation
48	UEFA
15	CAF
1	CONCACAF

=== By representatives of domestic league ===
National squad	Players
Malta	15
Morocco	15
Moldova	9
