= Denmark women's national football team results (2020–present) =

This article provides details of international football games played by the Denmark women's national football team from 2020 to present.

== Results ==
Key
Win
Draw
Defeat

=== 2020 ===
4 March 2020 Algarve Cup	Denmark	1–2	Norway	Parchal, Portugal
14:00	Harder 7'	Report	Thorsnes 13'; Jensen 90+3'	Stadium: Vista Municipal Stadium; Attendance: 198; Referee: Emikar Calderas, Venezuela

7 March 2020 2020 Algarve Cup	Sweden	1–2	Denmark	Lagos, Portugal
14:30	Hurtig 11'	Report	S. Larsen 56'; Christiansen 90+3'	Stadium: Lagos Municipal Stadium; Attendance: 203; Referee: Francia González (Mexico)

10 March 2020 2020 Algarve Cup	Denmark	4–0	Belgium	Lagos, Portugal
17:30	Harder 6'; Thomsen 13'; Christiansen 40'; Ballisager 47'	Report		Stadium: Lagos Municipal Stadium; Attendance: 15; Referee: Ivana Martinčić, Croatia

17 September 2020 2021 Euro qualifying	Bosnia and Herzegovina	0–4	Denmark	Zenica, Bosnia and Herzegovina
16:00		Report	Nadim 38' (pen.); Troelsgaard 44'; Sevecke 45'; Christiansen 90'	Stadium: Bosnia and Herzegovina FA Training Centre; Attendance: 0 Referee: Sandra Bastos (Portugal)

22 September 2020 2021 Euro qualifying	Malta	0–8	Denmark	Ta' Qali, Malta
18:30		Report	S. Larsen 7'; Nadim 8', 43'; Troelsgaard 47', 74'; Harder 53'; Junge 56'; Bruun 68'	Stadium: The National Stadium; Attendance: 0 Referee: María Dolores Martinez Madrona (Spain)

21 October 2020 (Note: All matches originally scheduled to be played in April and June 2020 were postponed due to the COVID-19 pandemic in Europe. These matches were subsequently rescheduled to be played between September and November 2020.) 2021 Euro qualifying	Denmark	4–0	Israel	Viborg, Denmark
18:00	Harder 48', 55'; Kuznetsov 53' (o.g.); Junge 81'	Report		Stadium: Viborg Stadium; Attendance: 284; Referee: Reelika Turi (Estonia)

27 October 2020 2021 Euro qualifying	Italy	1–3	Denmark	Empoli, Italy
17:30	Giacinti 60'	Report	Nadim 17', 47'	Stadium: Stadio Carlo Castellani; Attendance: 0 Referee: Cheryl Foster (Wales)

1 December 2020 (Note: Matches originally scheduled to be played on 22 September 2020 were rearranged following postponements to other matches due to the COVID-19 pandemic in Europe.) 2021 Euro qualifying	Denmark	0–0	Italy	Viborg, Denmark
17:15	Ballisager 72'; Sevecke 80'; Troelsgaard 84'	Report	Girelli 60'	Stadium: Viborg Stadium; Attendance: 216

=== 2021 ===
8 April 2021 Friendly	Republic of Ireland	0–1	Denmark	Dublin, Republic of Ireland
19:30		Report	Sørensen 9'	Stadium: Tallaght Stadium; Attendance: 0 Referee: Louise Thompson (Northern Ireland)

13 April 2021 Friendly	Wales	1–1	Denmark	Cardiff, Wales
20:15	Fishlock 60'	Report	Harder 24'	Stadium: Cardiff City Stadium; Attendance: 0 Referee: Stacey Pearson (England)

10 June 2021 Friendly	Denmark	3–2	Australia	Horsens, Denmark
18:00 CEST (UTC+2)	Yallop 15' (o.g.); Sevecke 21'; Arnold 25' (o.g.)	Report	Fowler 87'; Polkinghorne 90+2'	Stadium: CASA Arena Horsens; Attendance: 2,195; Referee: Lina Lehtovaara (Finland)

15 June 2021 Friendly	Spain	3–0	Denmark	Alcorcón, Spain
19:30 CEST (UTC+2)	Bonmatí 45', 84'; Guijarro 67'	Report		Stadium: Estadio de Santo Domingo; Attendance: 500; Referee: Karoline Wacker (Germany)

16 September 2021 2023 World Cup qualifying	Denmark	7–0	Malta	Viborg, Denmark
18:00 CEST (UTC+2)	Troelsgaard 14'; Bruun 23', 48'; S. Larsen 26'; Harder 47'; Sevecke 78'; Johansen (yellow card) 80'; Thrige 89'	Report	Zammit (yellow card) 72'; Zahra (yellow card) 90'	Stadium: Viborg Stadion; Attendance: 4,353; Referee: Karoline Wacker (Germany)

21 September 2021 2023 World Cup qualifying	Azerbaijan	0–8	Denmark	Baku, Azerbaijan
20:00 AZT (UTC+4)		Report	Bruun 3', 62'; S. Larsen 11', 26', 60'; Mollayeva 43' (o.g.); Gejl 75'; Snerle 76'	Stadium: ASK Arena; Attendance: 53; Referee: Zuzana Valentová (Slovakia)

21 October 2021 2023 World Cup qualifying	Denmark	8–0	Bosnia and Herzegovina	Viborg, Denmark
18:00 CEST (UTC+2)	Bruun 7', 27', 35', 39', 58'; Gejl 65'; Harder 80'; Thrige 90'	Report		Stadium: Viborg Stadion; Attendance: 4,161; Referee: Veronika Kovarova (Czech Republic)

26 October 2021 2023 World Cup qualifying	Montenegro	1−5	Denmark	Podgorica, Montenegro
18:00 CEST (UTC+2)	Kuć 53'	Report	S. Larsen 17', 72'; Bruun 27'; Svava 40'; Troelsgaard 54'	Stadium: Camp FSCG; Attendance: 166; Referee: Olivia Tschon (Austria)

25 November 2021 2023 World Cup qualifying	Bosnia and Herzegovina	0–3	Denmark	Zenica, Bosnia and Herzegovina
13:00 CET (UTC+1)		Report	Kühl 1'; Bruun 14'; Snerle 81'	Stadium: FF BH Football Training Centre; Attendance: 97; Referee: Zulema Gonzalez Gonzalez (Spain)

30 November 2021 2023 World Cup qualifying	Denmark	3–1	Russia	Viborg, Denmark
18:00 CET (UTC+1)	Bruun 65'; Troelsgaard 76' (pen.); Gejl 84'	Report	Korovkina 89'	Stadium: Viborg Stadion; Attendance: 3,736; Referee: Cheryl Foster (Wales)

=== 2022 ===
16 February 2022 2022 Algarve Cup	Denmark	0–1	Italy	Lagos, Portugal
12:00 WET (UTC)		Report	Bonansea 50'	Stadium: Estádio Municipal de Lagos; Attendance: 197; Referee: Susana Corella (Ecuador)

18 February 2022 2022 Algarve Cup	Sweden	3–0 awarded (Note: Denmark automatically forfeited the game after an outbreak of COVID-19 forced them to leave the tournament.)	Denmark	Algarve, Portugal
		Report		Stadium: Estádio Algarve

8 April 2022 2023 World Cup qualifying	Malta	0–2	Denmark	Ta' Qali, Malta
18:00 CET (UTC+1)		Report	Thomsen 5'; Holdt 8'	Stadium: Centenary Stadium; Attendance: 393; Referee: Kristina Georgieva (Bulgaria)

12 April 2022 2023 World Cup qualifying	Denmark	2–0	Azerbaijan	Viborg, Denmark
18:00 CET (UTC+1)	S. Larsen 2'; K. Holmgaard 76'	Report		Stadium: Viborg Stadion; Attendance: 3,135; Referee: Silvia Domingos (Portugal)

12 June 2022 Friendly	Austria	1–2	Denmark	Wiener Neustadt, Austria
13:30 CEST (UTC+2)	S. Zadrazil 29'	Report	Harder 65'; Junge 75'	Stadium: Stadion Wiener Neustadt; Attendance: 1,150; Referee: Aleksandra Česen (Slovenia)

24 June 2022 Exhibition game	Denmark	2–1	Brazil	Copenhagen, Denmark
19:00 CEST (UTC+2)	Thomsen 17'; Gejl 90+1'	Report	Debinha 87'	Stadium: Parken Stadium; Attendance: 21,542; Referee: Henrikke Nervik (Norway)

29 June 2022 Friendly	Denmark	1–2	Norway	Viborg, Denmark
19:00 CEST (UTC+2)	Bruun 1'	Report	Reiten 39', 52'	Stadium: Viborg Stadion; Attendance: 3,304; Referee: Franziska Wildfeuer (Germany)

8 July 2022 Euro 2022 Group B	Germany	4–0	Denmark	Brentford, England
	Magull 21'; Schüller 57'; Lattwein 78'; Popp 86'	Report		Stadium: Brentford Community Stadium; Attendance: 15,736; Referee: Esther Staubli (Switzerland)

12 July 2022 Euro 2022 Group B	Denmark	1–0	Finland	Milton Keynes, England
17:00 BST (UTC+1)	Harder 72'	Report		Stadium: Stadium MK; Attendance: 11,615; Referee: Iuliana Demetrescu (Romania)

16 July 2022 Euro 2022 Group B	Denmark	0–1	Spain	Brentford, England
20:00 BST (UTC+1)		Report	Cardona 90'	Stadium: Brentford Community Stadium; Attendance: 16,041; Referee: Rebecca Welch (England)

1 September 2022 2023 World Cup qualifying	Denmark	5–1	Montenegro	Viborg, Denmark
18:00 CEST (UTC+2)	K. Holmgaard 3'; Harder 25' (pen.); Ballisager 46'; Bruun 50'; Hasbo 82'	Report	Vujadinović 22'	Stadium: Viborg Stadion; Attendance: 3,398; Referee: Désirée Grundbacher (Switzerland)

6 September 2022 2023 World Cup qualifying	Russia	v	Denmark	Cancelled
		Report

11 October 2022 Friendly	Denmark	1–3	Australia	Viborg, Denmark
18:00 CEST (UTC+2)	K. Holmgaard 1'	Report	Foord 66', 76'; Gorry 74'	Stadium: Viborg Stadion; Attendance: 2,325; Referee: Sara Persson (Sweden)

11 November 2022 Friendly	Switzerland	1–2	Denmark	Schaffhausen, Switzerland
19:00 CET (UTC+1)	Reuteler 51'	Report	Bruun 65', 80'	Stadium: Wefox Arena Schaffhausen; Attendance: 1,313; Referee: Maria Marotta (Italy)

15 November 2022 Friendly	Netherlands	2–0	Denmark	Zwolle, Netherlands
20:00 CET (UTC+1)	Janssen 26'; Beerensteyn 55'	Report		Stadium: MAC³PARK Stadion; Attendance: 4,534; Referee: Fabienne Michel (Germany)

=== 2023 ===
15 February 2023 Tournoi de France	France	1–0	Denmark	Laval, France
21:10 CET (UTC+1)	Bilbault 31'	Report		Stadium: Stade Francis Le Basser; Attendance: 7,409; Referee: Monika Mularczyk (Poland)

18 February 2023 Tournoi de France	Denmark	2–0	Norway	Laval, France
18:00 CET (UTC+1)	Hasbo 9'; Svava 84'	Report		Stadium: Stade Francis Le Basser; Referee: Victoria Beyer (France)

21 February 2023 Tournoi de France	Denmark	3–2	Uruguay	Laval, France
18:00 CET (UTC+1)	Bredgaard 8'; Sevecke 89'; Thomsen 90'	Report	Correa 16'; Aquino 84'	Stadium: Stade Francis Le Basser; Referee: Alexandra Collin (France)

7 April Friendly	Sweden	0–1	Denmark	Malmö, Sweden
15:00 CEST (UTC+2)		Report	S. Larsen 93'	Stadium: Eleda Stadion; Attendance: 8,334; Referee: Riem Hussein (Germany)

11 April Friendly	Denmark	1–0	Japan	Odense, Denmark
18:00 UTC+2	Minami 78' (o.g.)	Report		Stadium: Odense Stadium; Attendance: 4,757; Referee: Shona Shukrula (Netherlands)

5 July Friendly	Denmark	0–2	Spain	Gladsaxe, Denmark
18:00 UTC+2		Report	Batlle 7'; Paralluelo 53'	Stadium: Gladsaxe Stadium; Attendance: 5,647; Referee: Maral Mirzai Beni (Sweden)

22 July 2023 World Cup Group D	Denmark	1–0	China	Perth, Australia
20:00 UTC+8	Vangsgaard 90'	Report		Stadium: Perth Rectangular Stadium; Attendance: 16,989; Referee: Marie-Soleil Beaudoin (Canada)

28 July 2023 World Cup Group D	England	1–0	Denmark	Sydney, Australia
18:30 UTC+8	James 7'	Report		Stadium: Sydney Football Stadium; Attendance: 40,439; Referee: Tess Olofsson (Sweden)

1 August 2023 World Cup Group D	Haiti	0–2	Denmark	Perth, Australia
19:00 UTC+8		Report	Harder 22' (pen.); Troelsgaard 90+10'	Stadium: Perth Rectangular Stadium; Attendance: 17,897; Referee: Oh Hyeon-jeong (South Korea)

7 August 2023 World Cup R16	Australia	2–0	Denmark	Sydney, Australia
20:30 UTC+10	Foord 29'; Raso 70'	Report		Stadium: Stadium Australia; Attendance: 75,784; Referee: Rebecca Welch (England)

22 September 2023–24 Nations League	Denmark	2–0	Germany	Viborg, Denmark
18:00 UTC+2	Vangsgaard 23', 64'	Report		Stadium: Viborg Stadium; Attendance: 4,210; Referee: Marta Huerta de Aza (Spain)

26 September 2023–24 Nations League	Wales	1–5	Denmark	Cardiff, Wales
19:15 UTC+1	Jess Fishlock 51'	Report	Harder 6' (pen.), 11', 90'; Thøgersen 60'; Troelsgaard 87'	Stadium: Cardiff City Stadium; Attendance: 8,607; Referee: Stéphanie Frappart (France)

27 October 2023–24 Nations League	Iceland	0–1	Denmark	Reykjavík, Iceland
20:30		Report	Vangsgaard 71'	Stadium: Laugardalsvöllur; Referee: Ivana Martinčić (Croatia)

31 October 2023–24 Nations League	Denmark	2–1	Wales	Viborg, Denmark
18:00 UTC+1	Vangsgaard 28'; Bredgaard 38'	Report	Fishlock 72'	Stadium: Viborg Stadium; Attendance: 2,227; Referee: Sandra Braz (Portugal)

1 December 2023–24 Nations League	Germany	3–0	Denmark	Rostock, Germany
20:30 UTC+1	Popp 14'; Hegering 26'; Bühl 90+3'	Report		Stadium: Ostseestadion; Attendance: 19,120; Referee: Maria Caputi (Italy)

5 December 2023–24 Nations League	Denmark	0–1	Iceland	Viborg, Denmark
19:30 UTC+1		Report	Vilhjálmsdóttir 77'	Stadium: Viborg Stadium; Attendance: 4,453; Referee: Catarina Campos (Portugal)

=== 2024 ===
28 February Friendly	Denmark	1–1	Austria	Marbella, Spain
16:30	Harder 52'		Dunst 11'	Stadium: Marbella Football Center; Attendance: 116; Referee: Jason Barcelo (Gibraltar)

5 April Euro 2025 qualifying	Czech Republic	1–3	Denmark	Uherské Hradiště, Czechia
18:00 UTC+1	Stašková 42'	Report	Vangsgaard 7'; Ballisager 68'; Hasbo 72'	Stadium: Miroslava Valenty Stadium; Attendance: 2,426; Referee: Iuliana Demetrescu (Romania)

9 April Euro 2025 qualifying	Denmark	4–2	Belgium	Viborg, Denmark
18:00 UTC+1	Vangsgaard 29', 39'; Svava 44'; Thøgersen 62'	Report	Kees 67'; Delacauw 72'	Stadium: Viborg Stadium; Attendance: 1,660; Referee: Rebecca Welch (England)

31 May Euro 2025 qualifying	Denmark	0–2	Spain	Vejle, Denmark
19:00 UTC+1		Report	Hermoso 17'; Mariona 28' (pen.)	Stadium: Vejle Stadium; Attendance: 6,014; Referee: Ivana Projkovska (Macedonia)

4 June Euro 2025 qualifying	Spain	3–2	Denmark	Santa Cruz de Tenerife, Spain
20:30 UTC+1	Bruna 74'; Paredes 77'; L. García 90+2'	Report	Thomsen 4', 72'	Stadium: Estadio Heliodoro Rodríguez López; Attendance: 17,532; Referee: Maria Sole Ferrieri Caputi (Italy)

12 July Euro 2025 qualifying	Belgium	0–3	Denmark	Sint-Truiden, Belgium
20:00 UTC+1		Report	Cayman 60' (o.g.); Harder 65'; S. Holmgaard 82'	Stadium: Stayen; Attendance: 0 Referee: Ivana Martinčić (Croatia)

16 July Euro 2025 qualifying	Denmark	2–0	Czech Republic	Vejle, Denmark
19:00 UTC+1	Bruun 55'; Thomsen 63'	Report		Stadium: Vejle Stadium; Attendance: 3,303; Referee: Abigail Byrne (England)

25 October Friendly	Denmark	5–0	South Africa	Aalborg, Denmark
18:00 UTC+1	Obaze 51'; Bruun 55', 57'; Vangsgaard 64'; Kühl 75'	Report		Stadium: Aalborg Stadium; Attendance: 4,125; Referee: Ifeoma Kulmala (Finland)

29 October Friendly	Denmark	1–2	Netherlands	Esbjerg, Denmark
18:00	Kramer 87'		Brugts 26'; van de Donk 28'	Stadium: Esbjerg Stadium; Attendance: 5,414

2 December Friendly	Denmark	2–0	Iceland	Murcia, Spain
18:00 UTC+1	Bruun 16', 40'	Report		Stadium: Pinatar Arena; Attendance: 105; Referee: Jana Adámková (Czechia)

=== 2025 ===
21 February 2025 Nations League	Denmark	1–2	Sweden	Odense, Denmark
19:15	Harder 17' (pen.)	Report	Sembrant 6'; Rolfö 54'	Stadium: Odense Stadium; Attendance: 3,202; Referee: Riem Hussein (Germany)

25 February 2025 Nations League	Italy	1–3	Denmark	La Spezia, Italy
18:00	Cambiaghi 58'	Report	Færge 53'; S. Holmgaard 74'; Thomsen 90+3'	Stadium: Stadio Alberto Picco; Attendance: 1,671; Referee: Olatz Rivera Olmedo (Spain)

4 April 2025 Nations League	Wales	1–2	Denmark	Cardiff, Wales
19:15 UTC+1	Holland 34'	Report	Bruun 7'; Vangsgaard 72'	Stadium: Cardiff City Stadium; Attendance: 6,779; Referee: Michalina Diakow (Poland)

8 April 2025 Nations League	Denmark	0–3	Italy	Herning, Denmark
18:00 UTC+2		Report	Caruso 59'; Di Guglielmo 79'; Girelli 86'	Stadium: MCH Arena; Attendance: 5,166; Referee: Ivana Martinčić (Croatia)

30 May 2025 Nations League	Denmark	1–0	Wales	Odense, Denmark
19:15 UTC+2	Harder 48'	Report		Stadium: Odense Stadium; Attendance: 3,442; Referee: Catarina Campos (Portugal)

3 June 2025 Nations League	Sweden	6–1	Denmark	Solna, Sweden
19:30 UTC+2	Blackstenius 1' 43' 53'; Rytting Kaneryd 5'; Angeldahl 11'; Hurtig 90+2'	Report	Thomsen 41'	Stadium: Strawberry Arena; Attendance: 12,428; Referee: Jana Adámková (Czechia)

4 July Euro 2025	Denmark	0–1	Sweden	Geneva, Switzerland
18:00 UTC+2		Report	Angeldal 55'	Stadium: Stade de Genève; Attendance: 17,319; Referee: Edina Alves Batista (Brasil)

8 July Euro 2025	Germany	2–1	Denmark	Basel, Switzerland
18:00	Nüsken 56' (pen.); Schüller 66'	Report	Vangsgaard 26'	Stadium: St. Jakob-Park; Attendance: 34,165; Referee: Catarina Campos (Portugal)
Note: The audience number set a new record for attendance at a Euros group-stage match not including the host nation.

12 July Euro 2025	Poland	3–2	Denmark	Lucerne, Switzerland
21:00	Padilla 13'; Pajor 20'; Wiankowska 76'	Report	Thomsen 59'; Bruun 83'	Stadium: Allmend Stadion Luzern; Attendance: 14,213; Referee: Olatz Rivera Olmedo (Spain)

24 October 2025 Nations League Play-offs	Finland	1–6	Denmark	Tampere, Finland
19:00 UTC+3	Lindström 90'	Report	Snerle 10'; Svava 39'; Harder 45+2', 68'; S. Holmgaard 86', 90+4'	Stadium: Tammelan Stadion; Attendance: 6,474; Referee: Désirée Grundbacher (Switzerland)

28 October 2025 Nations League Play-offs	Denmark	2–0	Finland	Copenhagen, Denmark
18:00 UTC+2	Kühl 73'; Harder 85' (pen.)	Report		Stadium: Parken Stadium; Attendance: 14,475; Referee: Marta Huerta de Aza (Spain)

1 December Friendly	Norway	0–0	Denmark	La Línea, Spain
18:00 UTC+1				Stadium: Estadio Municipal de La Línea

=== 2026 ===
3 March 2027 FIFA Women's World Cup qualification	Denmark	3–1	Serbia	Horsens, Denmark
18:00 UTC+1	Bredgaard 13'; Vangsgaard 19'; Harder 64' (pen.)	Report	Stokić 40'	Stadium: Forum Horsens Stadium; Attendance: 2,814; Referee: Abigail Byrne (England)

7 March 2027 FIFA Women's World Cup qualification	Italy	1–1	Denmark	Vicenza, Italy
18:15 UTC+1	Piemonte 19'	Report	Holdt 63'	Stadium: Stadio Romeo Menti; Attendance: 5,278; Referee: Désirée Blanco (Switzerland)

14 April 2027 FIFA Women's World Cup qualification	Sweden	1–2	Denmark	Gothenburg, Sweden
19:00 UTC+2	Jusu Bah 8'	Report (FIFA); Report (UEFA)	Harder 30'; Thomsen 90+2'	Stadium: Gamla Ullevi; Attendance: 12,573; Referee: Ivana Martinčić (Croatia)

18 April 2027 FIFA Women's World Cup qualification	Denmark	0–0	Italy	Copenhagen, Denmark
15:00 UTC+2		Report (FIFA); Report (UEFA)		Stadium: Parken Stadium; Attendance: 12,013; Referee: Emanuela Rusta (Albania)

5 June 2027 FIFA Women's World Cup qualification	Denmark	2–1	Sweden	Odense, Denmark
19:15 UTC+2	Fløe 25'; Harder 30'	Report	Rytting Kaneryd 52'	Stadium: Odense Stadium; Attendance: 5,902; Referee: Stéphanie Frappart (France)

9 June 2027 FIFA Women's World Cup qualification	Serbia	1–4	Denmark	Stara Pazova, Serbia
19:00 UTC+2	Poljak 15'	Report (FIFA); Report (UEFA)	Fløe 8'; Vangsgaard 14', 42'; Harder 40' (pen.)	Stadium: Serbian FA Sports Center; Referee: Rasa Grigonė (Lithuania)

9 October Friendly	Canada	1–1	Denmark	Montreal, Canada
19:00 UTC−4	Smith 84'	Report	Harder 24'	Stadium: Stade Saputo; Attendance: 10,187; Referee: Priscila Pérez (Mexico)

12 October Friendly	Canada	3–4	Denmark	Toronto, Canada
15:30 UTC−4	Pridham 10'; Viens 49'; Smith 70'	Report	Holdt 23', 32'; Harder 27'; Thomsen 61'	Stadium: BMO Field

== Forthcoming fixtures ==
The following matches are scheduled:

5 December Friendly	Denmark	v	Zambia	Esbjerg, Denmark
14:00 UTC+1				Stadium: Esbjerg Stadium

== Head-to-head records ==
As of 12 October 2026

Head to head records
Opponent	P	W	D	L	GF	GA	W%	D%	L%
Australia	3	1	0	2	4	7	33.33	0	66.67
Austria	2	1	1	0	3	2	50	50	0
Azerbaijan	2	2	0	0	10	0	100	0	0
Belgium	3	3	0	0	11	2	100	0	0
Bosnia and Herzegovina	3	3	0	0	15	0	100	0	0
Brazil	1	1	0	0	2	1	100	0	0
Canada	2	1	1	0	5	4	50	50	0
China	1	1	0	0	1	0	100	0	0
Czech Republic	2	2	0	0	5	1	100	0	0
England	1	0	0	1	0	1	0	0	100
Finland	3	3	0	0	9	1	100	0	0
France	1	0	0	1	0	1	0	0	100
Germany	4	1	0	3	3	9	25	0	75
Haiti	1	1	0	0	2	0	100	0	0
Iceland	3	2	0	1	3	1	66.67	0	33.33
Israel	1	1	0	0	4	0	100	0	0
Italy	7	3	2	2	7	7	42.86	28.57	28.57
Japan	1	1	0	0	1	0	100	0	0
Malta	3	3	0	0	17	0	100	0	0
Montenegro	2	2	0	0	10	2	100	0	0
Netherlands	2	0	0	2	1	4	0	0	100
Norway	4	1	1	2	4	4	25	25	50
Poland	1	0	0	1	2	3	0	0	100
Republic of Ireland	1	1	0	0	1	0	100	0	0
Russia	1	1	0	0	3	1	100	0	0
Serbia	2	2	0	0	7	2	100	0	0
South Africa	1	1	0	0	5	0	100	0	0
Spain	5	0	0	5	2	11	0	0	100
Sweden	8	4	0	4	9	15	50	0	50
Switzerland	1	1	0	0	2	1	100	0	0
Uruguay	1	1	0	0	3	2	100	0	0
Wales	5	4	1	0	11	4	80	20	0
Totals	75	46	5	24	153	80	61.33	6.67	32

=== FIFA Top 20 ===
As of 12 October 2026

Head to head records
Opponent	P	W	D	L	GF	GA	W%	D%	L%
Australia	3	1	0	2	4	7	33.33	0	66.67
Austria	2	1	1	0	3	2	50	50	0
Belgium	3	3	0	0	11	2	100	0	0
Brazil	1	1	0	0	2	1	100	0	0
Canada	2	1	1	0	5	4	50	50	0
China	1	1	0	0	1	0	100	0	0
England	1	0	0	1	0	1	0	0	100
France	1	0	0	1	0	1	0	0	100
Germany	4	1	0	3	3	9	25	0	75
Iceland	3	2	0	1	3	1	66.67	0	33.33
Italy	7	3	2	2	7	7	42.86	28.57	28.57
Japan	1	1	0	0	1	0	100	0	0
Netherlands	2	0	0	2	1	4	0	0	100
Norway	4	1	1	2	4	4	25	25	50
Spain	5	0	0	5	2	11	0	0	100
Sweden	8	4	0	4	9	15	50	0	50
Switzerland	1	1	0	0	2	1	100	0	0
Totals	45	19	4	22	51	64	42.22	8.89	48.89
