= 2021 in Swedish football =

Football in Sweden
- Season: 2021

Men's football
- Allsvenskan: Malmö FF
- Svenska Cupen: Hammarby

The 2021 season was the 124th season of competitive football in Sweden. The men's team failed to qualify for the World Cup 2022, and the women's team qualified for the Women's World Cup 2023.

== Domestic results ==
=== Men's football ===
==== 2021 Allsvenskan ====
Pos	Team	Pld	W	D	L	GF	GA	GD	Pts	Qualification or relegation
1	Malmö FF (C)	30	17	8	5	58	30	+28	59	Qualification for the Champions League first qualifying round
2	AIK	30	18	5	7	45	25	+20	59	Qualification for the Europa Conference League second qualifying round (Note: The 2021–22 Svenska Cupen winners qualified for the Europa Conference League second qualifying round. Since the cup winners (Malmö FF) qualified based on league position, the cup winner spot was passed to the second-placed team, and the last Conference League second qualifying round spot was passed to the fourth-placed team.)
3	Djurgårdens IF	30	17	6	7	46	30	+16	57	Qualification for the Europa Conference League second qualifying round
4	IF Elfsborg	30	17	4	9	51	35	+16	55	Qualification for the Europa Conference League second qualifying round
5	Hammarby IF	30	15	8	7	54	41	+13	53	
6	Kalmar FF	30	13	8	9	41	39	+2	47	
7	IFK Norrköping	30	13	5	12	45	41	+4	44	
8	IFK Göteborg	30	11	8	11	42	39	+3	41	
9	Mjällby AIF	30	9	11	10	34	27	+7	38	
10	Varbergs BoIS	30	9	10	11	35	38	−3	37	
11	IK Sirius	30	10	7	13	39	53	−14	37	
12	BK Häcken	30	9	9	12	46	46	0	36	
13	Degerfors IF	30	10	4	16	34	51	−17	34	
14	Halmstads BK (R)	30	6	14	10	21	26	−5	32	Qualification for the relegation play-offs
15	Örebro SK (R)	30	4	6	20	23	58	−35	18	Relegation to Superettan
16	Östersunds FK (R)	30	3	5	22	24	59	−35	14	Relegation to Superettan

Source: svenskfotboll.se (in Swedish)
Rules for classification: 1) Points; 2) Goal difference; 3) Goals scored; 4) Head-to-head points; 5) Head-to-head goal difference; 6) Head-to-head away goals scored; 7) Play-off
(Note: Play-off is only played if need to decide champion, teams for relegation or UEFA competition and will be played on a neutral ground).
(C) Champions; (R) Relegated

==== 2021 Superettan ====
Pos	Team	Pld	W	D	L	GF	GA	GD	Pts	Promotion, qualification or relegation
1	IFK Värnamo (C, P)	30	18	5	7	44	29	+15	59	Promotion to Allsvenskan
2	GIF Sundsvall (P)	30	15	8	7	46	29	+17	53	Promotion to Allsvenskan
3	Helsingborgs IF (O, P)	30	13	9	8	47	29	+18	48	Qualification to promotion play-offs
4	Norrby IF	30	13	9	8	41	33	+8	48	
5	Östers IF	30	12	10	8	33	26	+7	46	
6	Landskrona BoIS	30	13	5	12	41	37	+4	44	
7	Trelleborgs FF	30	11	10	9	42	39	+3	43	
8	Örgryte IS	30	9	14	7	39	39	0	41	
9	AFC Eskilstuna	30	11	7	12	41	41	0	40	
10	IK Brage	30	10	9	11	40	42	−2	39	
11	Jönköpings Södra IF	30	10	8	12	34	37	−3	38	
12	Västerås SK	30	8	12	10	36	40	−4	36	
13	Akropolis IF (R)	30	9	8	13	28	44	−16	35	Qualification to relegation play-offs
14	GAIS (R)	30	10	4	16	31	40	−9	34	Qualification to relegation play-offs
15	Vasalunds IF (R)	30	7	5	18	35	52	−17	26	Relegation to Ettan
16	Falkenbergs FF (R)	30	6	7	17	34	55	−21	25	Relegation to Ettan

Source: svenskfotboll.se (in Swedish)
Rules for classification: 1) Points; 2) Goal difference; 3) Number of goals scored; 4) Head-to-head points; 5) Head-to-head goal difference; 6) Head-to-head away goals scored
(C) Champions; (O) Play-off winners; (P) Promoted; (R) Relegated

=== Women's football ===
==== 2021 Damallsvenskan ====
Pos	Team	Pld	W	D	L	GF	GA	GD	Pts	Qualification or relegation
1	FC Rosengård (C)	22	18	3	1	54	10	+44	57	Qualification to Champions League second round
2	BK Häcken	22	14	5	3	53	13	+40	47	Qualification to Champions League second round
3	Kristianstads DFF	22	9	8	5	33	26	+7	35	Qualification to Champions League first round
4	Eskilstuna United DFF	22	10	5	7	27	22	+5	35	
5	Vittsjö GIK	22	8	8	6	29	20	+9	32	
6	Linköpings FC	22	8	7	7	33	27	+6	31	
7	Hammarby	22	9	4	9	40	37	+3	31	
8	KIF Örebro DFF	22	9	3	10	25	43	−18	30	
9	Djurgårdens IF	22	6	3	13	21	38	−17	21	
10	AIK	22	5	5	12	14	48	−34	20	
11	Piteå IF	22	4	4	14	19	38	−19	16	
12	Växjö DFF (R)	22	2	5	15	7	33	−26	11	Relegation to Elitettan

Source: svenskfotboll.se
Rules for classification: 1) Points; 2) Goal difference; 3) Number of goals scored; 4) Head-to-head points; 5) Head-to-head goal difference; 6) Head-to-head away goals scored
(C) Champions; (R) Relegated

==== 2021 Elitettan ====
2021 Elitettan

== National teams ==
=== Sweden men's national football team ===
==== Friendlies ====
Win Draw Loss

31 March 2021	Sweden	1–0	Estonia	Stockholm, Sweden
17:45 (UTC+1)	Berg 4'; Sema (yellow card) 61'; Svanberg (yellow card) 80'	Report	Kirss (yellow card) 52'; Pürg (yellow card) 73'; Anier (yellow card) 76'	Stadium: Friends Arena; Referee: Marco Fritz (Germany)

29 May 2021	Sweden	2–0	Finland	Stockholm, Sweden
18:00 (UTC+1)	Quaison 23'; Larsson 58' (pen.)	Report	Alho (yellow card) 31'	Stadium: Friends Arena; Referee: Jakob Kehlet (Denmark)

5 June 2021	Sweden	3-1	Armenia	Stockholm, Sweden
20:45 (UTC+1)	Forsberg 16'; Danielson 34'; Claesson (yellow card) 79'; Berg 85'; Bengtsson (yellow card) 89'	Report	Bichakhchyan 64' (yellow card) 90+1'; Muradyan (yellow card) 70'; Barseghyan (yellow card) 90'; Bayramyan (yellow card) 90+2'	Stadium: Friends Arena; Referee: Mattias Gestranius (Finland)

==== World Cup 2022 Qualifying ====
Pos	Team	Pld	W	D	L	GF	GA	GD	Pts	Qualification	Spain	Sweden	Greece	Georgia	Kosovo
1	Spain	8	6	1	1	15	5	+10	19	Qualification for 2022 FIFA World Cup	—	1–0	1–1	4–0	3–1
2	Sweden	8	5	0	3	12	6	+6	15	Advance to play-offs	2–1	—	2–0	1–0	3–0
3	Greece	8	2	4	2	8	8	0	10		0–1	2–1	—	1–1	1–1
4	Georgia	8	2	1	5	6	12	−6	7		1–2	2–0	0–2	—	0–1
5	Kosovo	8	1	2	5	5	15	−10	5		0–2	0–3	1–1	1–2	—

Source: FIFA, UEFA
Rules for classification: Tiebreakers

===== Matches =====
25 March 2021
20:45

Sweden	1–0	Georgia
Claesson 35'	Report (FIFA); Report (UEFA)

Friends Arena, Solna
Attendance: 0
Referee: Benoît Bastien (France)
28 March 2021
20:45

Kosovo	0–3	Sweden
	Report (FIFA); Report (UEFA)	Augustinsson 12'; Isak 35'; Larsson 70' (pen.)

Fadil Vokrri Stadium, Pristina
Attendance: 0
Referee: Tamás Bognár (Hungary)
2 September 2021
20:45

Sweden	2–1	Spain
Isak 6'; Claesson 57'	Report (FIFA); Report (UEFA)	Soler 5'

Friends Arena, Solna
Attendance: 16,901
Referee: Anthony Taylor (England)
8 September 2021
20:45 (21:45 UTC+3)

Greece	2–1	Sweden
Bakasetas 62'; Pavlidis 78'	Report (FIFA); Report (UEFA)	Quaison 80'

Olympic Stadium, Athens
Attendance: 3,475
Referee: Sergei Karasev (Russia)
9 October 2021
18:00

Sweden	3–0	Kosovo
Forsberg 29' (pen.); Isak 62'; Quaison 79'	Report (FIFA); Report (UEFA)

Friends Arena, Solna
Attendance: 44,213
Referee: Marco Di Bello (Italy)
12 October 2021
20:45

Sweden	2–0	Greece
Forsberg 59' (pen.); Isak 69'	Report (FIFA); Report (UEFA)

Friends Arena, Solna
Attendance: 47,314
Referee: Tobias Stieler (Germany)

==== Euro 2020 ====
===== Group E =====
Pos	Team	Pld	W	D	L	GF	GA	GD	Pts	Qualification
1	Sweden	3	2	1	0	4	2	+2	7	Advance to knockout stage
2	Spain (H)	3	1	2	0	6	1	+5	5	Advance to knockout stage
3	Slovakia	3	1	0	2	2	7	−5	3	
4	Poland	3	0	1	2	4	6	−2	1	

Source: UEFA
(H) Hosts

===== Matches =====
Group Stage

14 June 2021
21:00

Spain	0–0	Sweden
	Report

Estadio de La Cartuja, Seville
Attendance: 10,559
Referee: Slavko Vinčić (Slovenia)
18 June 2021
15:00 (16:00 UTC+3)

Sweden	1–0	Slovakia
Forsberg 77' (pen.)	Report

Krestovsky Stadium, Saint Petersburg
Attendance: 11,525
Referee: Daniel Siebert (Germany)
23 June 2021
18:00 (19:00 UTC+3)

Sweden	3–2	Poland
Forsberg 2', 59'; Claesson 90+4'	Report	Lewandowski 61', 84'

Krestovsky Stadium, Saint Petersburg
Attendance: 14,252
Referee: Michael Oliver (England)

Round of 16

29 June 2021
21:00 (20:00 UTC+1)

Sweden	1–2 (a.e.t.)	Ukraine
Forsberg 43'	Report	Zinchenko 27'; Dovbyk 120+1'

Hampden Park, Glasgow
Attendance: 9,221
Referee: Daniele Orsato (Italy)

=== 2021 ===
19 February 2021 FIFA International Friendly	Austria	1–6	Sweden	Paola, Malta
15:00 UTC+1	Kirchberger 25'	Report	Sembrant 20'; Rolfö 34', 56'; Hurtig 37'; Angeldal 45+1'; Jakobsson 81'	Stadium: Hibernians Stadium; Referee: Zuzana Valentová (Slovakia)

23 February 2021 FIFA International Friendly	Malta	0–3	Sweden	Paola, Malta
14:30 UTC+1		Report	Asllani 19'; Xuereb 60' (o.g.); Björn 82' (pen.)	Stadium: Hibernians Stadium; Referee: Maria Ferrieri (Italy)

10 April 2021 FIFA International Friendly	Sweden	1–1	United States	Stockholm
19:00 UTC+2	Hurtig 38'	Report	Rapinoe 87' (pen.)	Stadium: Friends Arena; Referee: Lina Lehtovaara (Finland)

13 April 2021 FIFA International Friendly	Poland	2–4	Sweden	Łódź, Poland
17:30 UTC+2	Pajor 26', 48'	Report	Blackstenius 37', 43'; Seger 86'; Hurtig 90+2'	Stadium: Stadion Miejski Widzewa; Referee: Reka Molnar (Hungary)

10 June 2021 FIFA International Friendly	Sweden	1–0	Norway	Kalmar
18:30 UTC+2	Blackstenius 66'	https://www.svenskfotboll.se/matchfakta/sverige-norge-landskamper-dam-senior/4948264/ Report (Svenskfotboll)] [https://uk.soccerway.com/matches/2021/06/10/world/friendly-women/sweden/norway/3496453/		Stadium: Guldfågeln Arena; Attendance: 500; Referee: Maika Vanderstichel (France)

15 June 2021 FIFA International Friendly	Sweden	0–0	Australia	Kalmar
18:45 UTC+2		https://www.svenskfotboll.se/matchfakta/sverige-australien-landskamper-dam-senior/4973278/ Report (Svenskfotboll)]		Stadium: Guldfågeln Arena; Attendance: 500; Referee: Ivana Martinčić (Croatia)

21 July 2021 Olympics GS	Sweden	3–0	United States	Tokyo, Japan
17:30 UTC+9	Blackstenius 25', 54'; Hurtig 72'	Report (FIFA)		Stadium: Tokyo Stadium; Attendance: 0 Referee: Yoshimi Yamashita (Japan)

24 July 2021 Olympics GS	Sweden	4–2	Australia	Saitama, Japan
17:30 UTC+9	Rolfö 20', 63'; Hurtig 52'; Blackstenius 82'	Report (FIFA)	Kerr 36', 48'	Stadium: Saitama Stadium 2002; Referee: Edina Alves Batista (Brazil)

27 July 2021 Olympics GS	New Zealand	0–2	Sweden	Rifu, Japan
17:00 UTC+9		Report (FIFA)	Anvegård 17'; Janogy 29'	Stadium: Miyagi Stadium; Referee: Laura Fortunato (Argentina)

30 July 2021 Olympics QF	Sweden	3–1	Japan	Saitama, Japan
	Eriksson 7'; Blackstenius 53'; Asllani 68' (pen.)	Report (FIFA)	Tanaka 23'	Stadium: Saitama Stadium 2002; Attendance: 0 Referee: Lucila Venegas (Mexico)

2 August 2021 Olympics SF	Australia	0–1	Sweden	Yokohama, Japan
		Report (FIFA)	Rolfö 46'	Stadium: International Stadium Yokohama; Referee: Melissa Borjas (Honduras)

6 August 2021 Olympics F	Sweden	1–1 (a.e.t.) (2–3 p)	Canada	Yokohama, Japan
	Blackstenius 34'	Report (FIFA)	Fleming 68' (pen.)	Stadium: International Stadium Yokohama; Referee: Anastasia Pustovoitova (Russia)
	Penalties
	Asllani (penalty missed); Björn (penalty scored); Schough (penalty scored); Anvegård (penalty missed); Seger (penalty missed); Andersson (penalty missed)		(penalty scored) Fleming; (penalty missed) Lawrence; (penalty missed) Gilles; (penalty missed) Leon; (penalty scored) Rose; (penalty scored) Grosso
