= Chantal Bondin =

Maltese footballer

Personal information
- Full name: Chantal Marie Bondin
- Birth name: Chantal Marie Fenech
- Date of birth: 25 March 1980 (age 46)
- Place of birth: Birkirkara, Malta
- Height: 1.71 m (5 ft 7 in)
- Position: Midfielder

Youth career
- Birkirkara

Senior career*
Years	Team	Apps	(Gls)
- Birkirkara
- Fgura United

International career^{‡}
2003–2010	Malta	6	(0)
- * Club domestic league appearances and goals ‡ National team caps and goals as of 24 June 2010

Chantal Marie Bondin (née Fenech; born 25 March 1980) is a Maltese footballer who plays as a midfielder for Birkirkara F.C. and the Malta women's national team.

== Personal life ==
Bondin married in December 2012. She has a daughter with her husband Mark Bondin, a football coach.

== See also ==
- List of Malta women's international footballers
