= Bondin =

Bondin is a Maltese surname. Notable people with the surname include:

- Amber Bondin (born 1991), Maltese singer
- Chantal Bondin (born 1980), Maltese footballer

== See also ==
- Bondin Township, Murray County, Minnesota
