= 2023 FIFA Women's World Cup qualification – UEFA Group E =

Football tournament qualification stage

UEFA Group E of the 2023 FIFA Women's World Cup qualification competition consists of six teams: Denmark, Russia, Bosnia and Herzegovina, Azerbaijan, Malta, and Montenegro. The composition of the nine groups in the qualifying group stage was decided by the draw held on 30 April 2021, with the teams seeded according to their coefficient ranking.

The group is played in home-and-away round-robin format between 16 September 2021 and 6 September 2022, with a pause for the Women's Euro 2022 in July. The group winners qualify for the final tournament, while the runners-up advance to the play-offs first round if they are one of the other six runners-up among all nine groups (not counting results against the sixth-placed team).

On 28 February 2022, Russia was suspended from the competition. On 2 May 2022, UEFA officially announced that Russia was no longer allowed to take part in the competition, and therefore Denmark qualified for the tournament with two games to spare.

== Standings ==
| Pos | Team | Pld | W | D | L | GF | GA | GD | Pts | Qualification | (Denmark) | (Bosnia and Herzegovina) | (Montenegro) | (Azerbaijan) | (Malta) | (Russia) |
|---|---|---|---|---|---|---|---|---|---|---|---|---|---|---|---|---|
| 1 | Denmark | 8 | 8 | 0 | 0 | 40 | 2 | +38 | 24 | 2023 FIFA Women's World Cup | — | 8–0 | 5–1 | 2–0 | 7–0 | ~~3–1~~ |
| 2 | Bosnia and Herzegovina | 8 | 3 | 2 | 3 | 9 | 17 | −8 | 11 | Play-offs | 0–3 | — | 2–3 | 1–0 | 1–0 | ~~0–4~~ |
| 3 | Montenegro | 8 | 3 | 0 | 5 | 9 | 17 | −8 | 9 | | 1–5 | 0–2 | — | 2–0 | 0–2 | Canc. |
| 4 | Azerbaijan | 8 | 2 | 1 | 5 | 5 | 16 | −11 | 7 (Note: Tied on head-to-head points (3). Head-to-head goal difference: Azerbaijan +1, Malta −1.) | | 0–8 | 1–1 | 1–0 | — | 1–2 | ~~0–4~~ |
| 5 | Malta | 8 | 2 | 1 | 5 | 6 | 17 | −11 | 7 | | 0–2 | 2–2 | 0–2 | 0–2 | — | Canc. |
| 6 | Russia (Note: On 28 February 2022, FIFA and UEFA suspended Russian national teams from all competitions due to the Russian invasion of Ukraine. On 2 May 2022, UEFA expelled Russia and declared all of their results to be null and void.) | 0 | 0 | 0 | 0 | 0 | 0 | 0 | 0 | Disqualified | Canc. | Canc. | ~~5–0~~ | ~~2–0~~ | ~~3–0~~ | — |

Source: UEFA
Rules for classification: Tiebreakers

== Matches ==
Times are CET/CEST, (Note: CEST (UTC+2) for dates between 28 March and 31 October 2021 and between 27 March and 30 October 2022, and CET (UTC+1) for all other dates.) as listed by UEFA (local times, if different, are in parentheses).

16 September 2021
18:00

| Denmark | 7−0 | Malta |
|---|---|---|
| Troelsgaard 14'; Bruun 23', 48'; S. Larsen 26'; Harder 47'; Sevecke 78'; Thrige 89' | Report (FIFA); Report (UEFA) |

Viborg Stadium, Viborg
Attendance: 4,353
Referee: Karoline Wacker (Germany)
17 September 2021
16:00

| Bosnia and Herzegovina | 2–3 | Montenegro |
|---|---|---|
| M. Hasanbegović 12'; Nikolić 19' | Report (FIFA); Report (UEFA) | Kuć 5', 9'; Bulatović 60' (pen.) |

FF BH Football Training Centre, Zenica
Referee: Justina Lavrenovaitė-Perez (Lithuania)
17 September 2021
18:00 (19:00 MST)

| Russia | Voided (2–0) | Azerbaijan |
|---|---|---|
| Fedorova 42'; Korovkina 75' | Report (FIFA); Report (UEFA) |

Sportivnyy Gorodok, Moscow
Referee: Viola Raudziņa (Latvia)

21 September 2021
16:00 (17:00 MST)

| Russia | Voided (5–0) | Montenegro |
|---|---|---|
| Korovkina 10'; Smirnova 54', 59', 88'; Belomyttseva 90' | Report (FIFA); Report (UEFA) |

Sportivnyy Gorodok, Moscow
Referee: Ewa Augustyn (Poland)
21 September 2021
18:00 (20:00 AZT)

| Azerbaijan | 0–8 | Denmark |
|---|---|---|
| | Report (FIFA); Report (UEFA) | Bruun 3', 62'; S. Larsen 11', 26', 60'; Mollayeva 43' (o.g.); Gejl 75'; Snerle 76' |

ASK Arena, Baku
Referee: Zuzana Valentová (Slovakia)
21 September 2021
18:30

| Malta | 2–2 | Bosnia and Herzegovina |
|---|---|---|
| M. Farrugia 81'; S. Farrugia 90+5' | Report (FIFA); Report (UEFA) | Nikolić 6'; Jelčić 33' |

Centenary Stadium, Ta' Qali
Attendance: 265
Referee: Lina Lehtovaara (Finland)

21 October 2021
14:00

| Montenegro | 2–0 | Azerbaijan |
|---|---|---|
| Bulatović 5'; Tošković 83' | Report (FIFA); Report (UEFA) |

Camp FSCG, Podgorica
Attendance: 350
Referee: Kristina Georgieva (Bulgaria)
21 October 2021
16:00 (17:00 MSK)

| Russia | Voided (3–0) | Malta |
|---|---|---|
| Korovkina 45'; Mashkova 47'; Belomyttseva 88' | Report (FIFA); Report (UEFA) |

Arena Khimki, Khimki
Referee: Miriama Matulova (Slovakia)
21 October 2021
18:00

| Denmark | 8–0 | Bosnia and Herzegovina |
|---|---|---|
| Bruun 7', 27', 35', 39', 58'; Gejl 65'; Harder 80'; Thrige 90' | Report (FIFA); Report (UEFA) |

Viborg Stadium, Viborg
Referee: Veronika Kovarova (Czech Republic)

26 October 2021
14:00

| Bosnia and Herzegovina | Voided (0–4) | Russia |
|---|---|---|
| | Report (FIFA); Report (UEFA) | Korovkina 36'; Kozhnikova 45+2', 85'; Abdullina 72' |

FF BH Football Training Centre, Zenica
Referee: Cristina Trandafir (Romania)
26 October 2021
16:00 (18:00 AZT)

| Azerbaijan | 1–2 | Malta |
|---|---|---|
| Seyfatdinova 90' | Report (FIFA); Report (UEFA) | Theuma 57' (pen.); Xuereb 86' |

ASK Arena, Baku
Referee: Réka Molnar (Hungary)
26 October 2021
18:00

| Montenegro | 1−5 | Denmark |
|---|---|---|
| Kuć 53' | Report (FIFA); Report (UEFA) | S. Larsen 17', 72'; Bruun 27'; Svava 40'; Troelsgaard 54' |

Podgorica City Stadium, Podgorica
Referee: Olivia Tschon (Austria)

25 November 2021
13:00

| Bosnia and Herzegovina | 0–3 | Denmark |
|---|---|---|
| | Report (FIFA); Report (UEFA) | Kühl 1'; Bruun 14'; Snerle 81' |

FF BH Football Training Centre, Zenica
Referee: Zulema Gonzalez Gonzalez (Spain)
25 November 2021
16:00 (19:00 AZT)

| Azerbaijan | Voided (0–4) | Russia |
|---|---|---|
| | Report (FIFA); Report (UEFA) | Fedorova 16'; Abdullina 28'; Andreeva 43'; Chernomyrdina 90+5' |

Dalga Arena, Baku
Referee: Alina Peşu (Romania)
26 November 2021
19:00

| Malta | 0–2 | Montenegro |
|---|---|---|
| | Report (FIFA); Report (UEFA) | Kuč 30'; Božić 82' |

Centenary Stadium, Ta' Qali
Referee: Kateryna Usova (Ukraine)

30 November 2021
13:00

| Bosnia and Herzegovina | 1–0 | Malta |
|---|---|---|
| Jelčić 36' | Report (FIFA); Report (UEFA) |

FF BH Football Training Centre, Zenica
Referee: Gamze Durmuş (Turkey)
30 November 2021
15:00 (18:00 AZT)

| Azerbaijan | 1–0 | Montenegro |
|---|---|---|
| Ahmadova 24' | Report (FIFA); Report (UEFA) |

Dalga Arena, Baku
Referee: Emanuela Rusta (Albania)
30 November 2021
18:00

| Denmark | Voided (3–1) | Russia |
|---|---|---|
| Bruun 65'; Troelsgaard 76' (pen.); Gejl 84' | Report (FIFA); Report (UEFA) | Korovkina 89' |

Viborg Stadium, Viborg
Referee: Cheryl Foster (Wales)

7 April 2022
14:00

| Montenegro | Cancelled | Russia |
|---|---|---|
| | Report (FIFA); Report (UEFA) |

Camp FSCG, Podgorica
7 April 2022
15:00

| Bosnia and Herzegovina | 1–0 | Azerbaijan |
|---|---|---|
| Nikolić 90+4' | Report (FIFA); Report (UEFA) |

Stadion Grbavica, Sarajevo
Referee: Kirsty Dowle (England)
8 April 2022
18:00

| Malta | 0–2 | Denmark |
|---|---|---|
| | Report (FIFA); Report (UEFA) | Thomsen 5'; Holdt 7' |

Centenary Stadium, Ta' Qali
Referee: Kristina Georgieva (Bulgaria)

12 April 2022
14:00

| Montenegro | 0–2 | Bosnia and Herzegovina |
|---|---|---|
| | Report (FIFA); Report (UEFA) | Krajšumović 21'; Nikolić 81' |

Camp FSCG, Podgorica
Referee: Sofik Torosyan (Armenia)
12 April 2022
18:00

| Denmark | 2–0 | Azerbaijan |
|---|---|---|
| S. Larsen 2'; K. Holmgaard 76' | Report (FIFA); Report (UEFA) |

Viborg Stadium, Viborg
Referee: Silvia Domingos (Portugal)
12 April 2022

| Malta | Cancelled | Russia |
|---|---|---|
| | Report (FIFA); Report (UEFA) |

Centenary Stadium, Ta' Qali

1 September 2022
18:00

| Denmark | 5–1 | Montenegro |
|---|---|---|
| Holmgaard 3'; Harder 25' (pen.); Pedersen 46'; Bruun 50'; Hasbo 82' | Report (FIFA); Report (UEFA) | Vujadinović 22' |

Viborg Stadium, Viborg
Referee: Désirée Grundbacher (Switzerland)
2 September 2022
19:30

| Malta | 0–2 | Azerbaijan |
|---|---|---|
| | Report (FIFA); Report (UEFA) | Bakarandze 10'; D. Mammadova 60' |

Centenary Stadium, Ta' Qali
Referee: Silvia Gasperotti (Italy)
2 September 2022

| Russia | Cancelled | Bosnia and Herzegovina |
|---|---|---|
| | Report (FIFA); Report (UEFA) |

6 September 2022

| Russia | Cancelled | Denmark |
|---|---|---|
| | Report (FIFA); Report (UEFA) |

6 September 2022
18:00 (20:00 AZT)

| Azerbaijan | 1–1 | Bosnia and Herzegovina |
|---|---|---|
| Parlak 67' | Report (FIFA); Report (UEFA) | Gačanica 64' |

Dalga Arena, Baku
Referee: Maika Vanderstichel (France)
6 September 2022
18:00

| Montenegro | 0–2 | Malta |
|---|---|---|
| | Report (FIFA); Report (UEFA) | M. Farrugia 28'; Lipman 45' |

Camp FSCG, Podgorica
Referee: Kirsty Dowle (England)

== Goalscorers ==
There were 91 goals scored in 26 matches, for an average of 3.5 goals per match.

13 goals

- (Denmark) Signe Bruun

7 goals

- (Denmark) Stine Larsen

5 goals

- (Russia) Nelli Korovkina

4 goals

- (Bosnia and Herzegovina) Milena Nikolić
- (Montenegro) Armisa Kuč

3 goals

- (Denmark) Mille Gejl
- (Denmark) Pernille Harder
- (Denmark) Sanne Troelsgaard
- (Russia) Nadezhda Smirnova

2 goals

- (Bosnia and Herzegovina) Maja Jelčić
- (Denmark) Karen Holmgaard
- (Denmark) Emma Snerle
- (Denmark) Sara Thrige
- (Malta) Maria Farrugia
- (Montenegro) Slađana Bulatović
- (Russia) Alsu Abdullina
- (Russia) Anna Belomyttseva
- (Russia) Marina Fedorova
- (Russia) Anna Kozhnikova

1 goal

- (Azerbaijan) Ayshan Ahmadova
- (Azerbaijan) Kristina Bakarandze
- (Azerbaijan) Diana Mammadova
- (Azerbaijan) Nazlıcan Parlak
- (Azerbaijan) Vusala Seyfatdinova
- (Bosnia and Herzegovina) Minela Gačanica
- (Bosnia and Herzegovina) Melisa Hasanbegović
- (Bosnia and Herzegovina) Sofija Krajšumović
- (Denmark) Stine Ballisager Pedersen
- (Denmark) Josefine Hasbo
- (Denmark) Olivia Holdt
- (Denmark) Kathrine Møller Kühl
- (Denmark) Rikke Sevecke
- (Denmark) Sofie Svava
- (Denmark) Janni Thomsen
- (Malta) Stefania Farrugia
- (Malta) Emma Lipman
- (Malta) Dorianne Theuma
- (Malta) Emma Xuerreb
- (Montenegro) Helena Božić
- (Montenegro) Anđela Tošković
- (Montenegro) Jelena Vujadinović
- (Russia) Alena Andreeva
- (Russia) Margarita Chernomyrdina
- (Russia) Kristina Mashkova

1 own goal

- (Azerbaijan) Mana Mollayeva (against Denmark)
