= Veronique Mifsud =

Maltese footballer

Personal information
- Date of birth: 11 February 2003 (age 23)
- Position: Midfielder

Team information
- Current team: Birkirkara

Senior career*
Years	Team	Apps	(Gls)
2015-2016	Zebbug Rangers		
2016–2024	Birkirkara		
2024-	Mġarr United		

International career^{‡}
2019	Malta U17	6	(2)
2019–	Malta	11	(0)
- * Club domestic league appearances and goals ‡ National team caps and goals as of 8 August 2025

Veronique Mifsud (born 11 February 2003) is a Maltese footballer who plays as a midfielder for Birkirkara F.C. and the Malta women's national team.

== Career ==
She made her debut for the national team on 7 April 2019 against Romania, coming on as a substitute for Nicole Sciberras. She had previously represented Malta U17 women's team.
