= Diana Mammadova =

Azerbaijani footballer (born 1998)

Diana Mammadova Диана Мамедова Diana Məmmədova
Personal information
- Full name: Diana Ruslanovna Mammadova
- Date of birth: 5 March 1998 (age 28)
- Height: 1.65 m (5 ft 5 in)
- Position: Defender

Senior career*
Years	Team	Apps	(Gls)
2019	Yenisey	12	(0)

International career^{‡}
2014	Azerbaijan U17	3	(0)
2015–2016	Azerbaijan U19	9	(0)
2019–	Azerbaijan	18	(2)
- * Club domestic league appearances and goals as of 23 November 2019 ‡ National team caps and goals as of 1 December 2023

Diana Ruslanovna Mammadova (Russian: Диана Руслановна Мамедова; Azerbaijani: Diana Ruslanovna Məmmədova; born 5 March 1998) is an Azerbaijani footballer who plays as a defender for the Azerbaijan women's national team.

== International goals ==
No.	Date	Venue	Opponent	Score	Result	Competition
1.	2 September 2022	Centenary Stadium, Ta'Qali, Malta	Malta	2–0	2–0	2023 FIFA Women's World Cup qualification
2.	1 December 2023	Alphamega Stadium, Limassol, Cyprus	Cyprus	1–0	1–0	2023–24 UEFA Women's Nations League

== See also ==
- List of Azerbaijan women's international footballers
