= Kirsty Feasey =

Maltese footballer

Personal information
- Date of birth: 7 February 1993 (age 33)
- Place of birth: England
- Position: Defender

Senior career*
Years	Team	Apps	(Gls)
–2012	Reading		
2012	Birkirkara		
2014–2017	Colney Heath		

International career^{‡}
2011–2013	Malta	4	(0)
- * Club domestic league appearances and goals ‡ National team caps and goals as of 27 October 2013

Kirsty Feasey (born 7 February 1993) is a Maltese former footballer who played as a defender. Born in England, she represented the Malta national team.
