= Maja Jelčić =

Bosnian footballer (born 2004)

Personal information
- Date of birth: 20 July 2004 (age 22)
- Place of birth: Čapljina, Bosnia and Herzegovina
- Height: 1.75 m (5 ft 9 in)
- Position: Forward

Team information
- Current team: Young Boys

Senior career*
Years	Team	Apps	(Gls)
20??–2020	HNK Čapljina		
2020–2023	SFK 2000		
2023–2026	Inter Milan	15	(1)
2024–2025	→ Napoli (loan)	10	(3)
2025–2026	→ BSC Young Boys (loan)	5	(0)
2026–	BSC Young Boys	0	(0)

International career^{‡}
2019	Bosnia and Herzegovina U17	3	(0)
2022–2023	Bosnia and Herzegovina U19	7	(10)
2020–	Bosnia and Herzegovina	21	(4)
- * Club domestic league appearances and goals as of 30 August 2024 ‡ National team caps and goals as of 23 July 2024

Maja Jelčić (born 20 July 2004) is a Bosnian footballer who currently plays as a forward for BSC Young Boys and the Bosnia and Herzegovina women's national team. In July 2026, Jelčić joined BSC Young Boys permanently after a season-long loan from Serie A club Inter Milan during the 25/26 season, signing a two-year contract with the club until Summer 2028.

== International goals ==
No.	Date	Venue	Opponent	Score	Result	Competition
1.	21 September 2021	Centenary Stadium, Ta'Qali, Malta	Malta	2–0	2–2	2023 FIFA Women's World Cup qualification
2.	30 November 2021	Bosnia and Herzegovina FA Training Centre, Zenica, Bosnia & Herzegovina	Malta	1–0	1–0	2023 FIFA Women's World Cup qualification
3.	22 September 2023	Ménfői úti Stadion, Győr, Hungary	Belarus	1–0	2–1	2023–24 UEFA Women's Nations League
4.	1 December 2023	Bonifika Stadium, Koper, Slovenia	Slovenia	1–0	1–2	2023–24 UEFA Women's Nations League
