= Kailey Willis =

Maltese footballer

Personal information
- Date of birth: 18 May 2003 (age 23)
- Position: Forward

Team information
- Current team: Hellas Verona
- Number: 20

Youth career
- 2017–2018: Tarxien Rainbows
- 2018–2020: Birkirkara

Senior career*
Years	Team	Apps	(Gls)
2017–2018	Tarxien Rainbows	14	(12)
2018–2020	Birkirkara	27	(26)
2020–2022	Hellas Verona	2	(0)
2022-2023	Chievo	3	(0)
2023	Meran	4	(0)
2023-	Venezia	33	(0)

International career^{‡}
2019	Malta U-17	3	(0)
2021–	Malta	29	(4)
- * Club domestic league appearances and goals as of 1 August 2025 ‡ National team caps and goals as of 9 June 2026

Kailey Willis (born 18 May 2003) is a Maltese footballer who plays as a forward for Italian Serie A club Hellas Verona Women and the Malta women's national team.

== Club career ==
Willis has played for Tarxien Rainbows FC and Birkirkara FC in Malta and for Hellas Verona in Italy, for Chievo Verona, Merano for half a season, and the rest Venezia fc for then olaying another season for Venezia FC and now is a player of Parma Calcio Femminile and played half of the season on loan with Brescia CF.

== International career ==
Willis made her senior debut for Malta on 10 June 2021. She scored a brace against Luxembourg on 20 February 2023, as Malta won 3–1.

== International goals ==
No.	Date	Venue	Opponent	Score	Result	Competition
1.	20 February 2023	Centenary Stadium, Ta'Qali, Malta	Luxembourg	1–0	3–1	Friendly
2.	20 February 2023	Centenary Stadium, Ta'Qali, Malta	Luxembourg	2–0	3–1	Friendly
3.	5 December 2023	Centenary Stadium, Ta'Qali, Malta	Latvia	1–1	2–1	2023–24 UEFA Women's Nations League
4.	5 June 2026	Cornaredo Stadium, Lugano, Switzerland	Switzerland	1–1	1–6	2027 FIFA Women's World Cup qualification
