= Ann-Marie Said =

Maltese footballer

Personal information
- Date of birth: 2 July 1994 (age 32)
- Height: 1.64 m (5 ft 5 in)
- Position: Midfielder

Senior career*
Years	Team	Apps	(Gls)
2015-2016	Raiders Luxol		
2016-2024	Birkirkara		
2024-	Mġarr United		

International career^{‡}
	Malta	52	(0)
- * Club domestic league appearances and goals ‡ National team caps and goals as of 1 August 2025

Ann-Marie Said (born 2 July 1994) is a Maltese footballer who plays as a midfielder and has appeared for the Malta women's national team.

== Career ==
Said has been capped for the Malta national team and, among other appearances, was part of the national team during the 2019 FIFA Women's World Cup qualifying cycle.
