= Emma Lipman =

British footballer (born 1989)

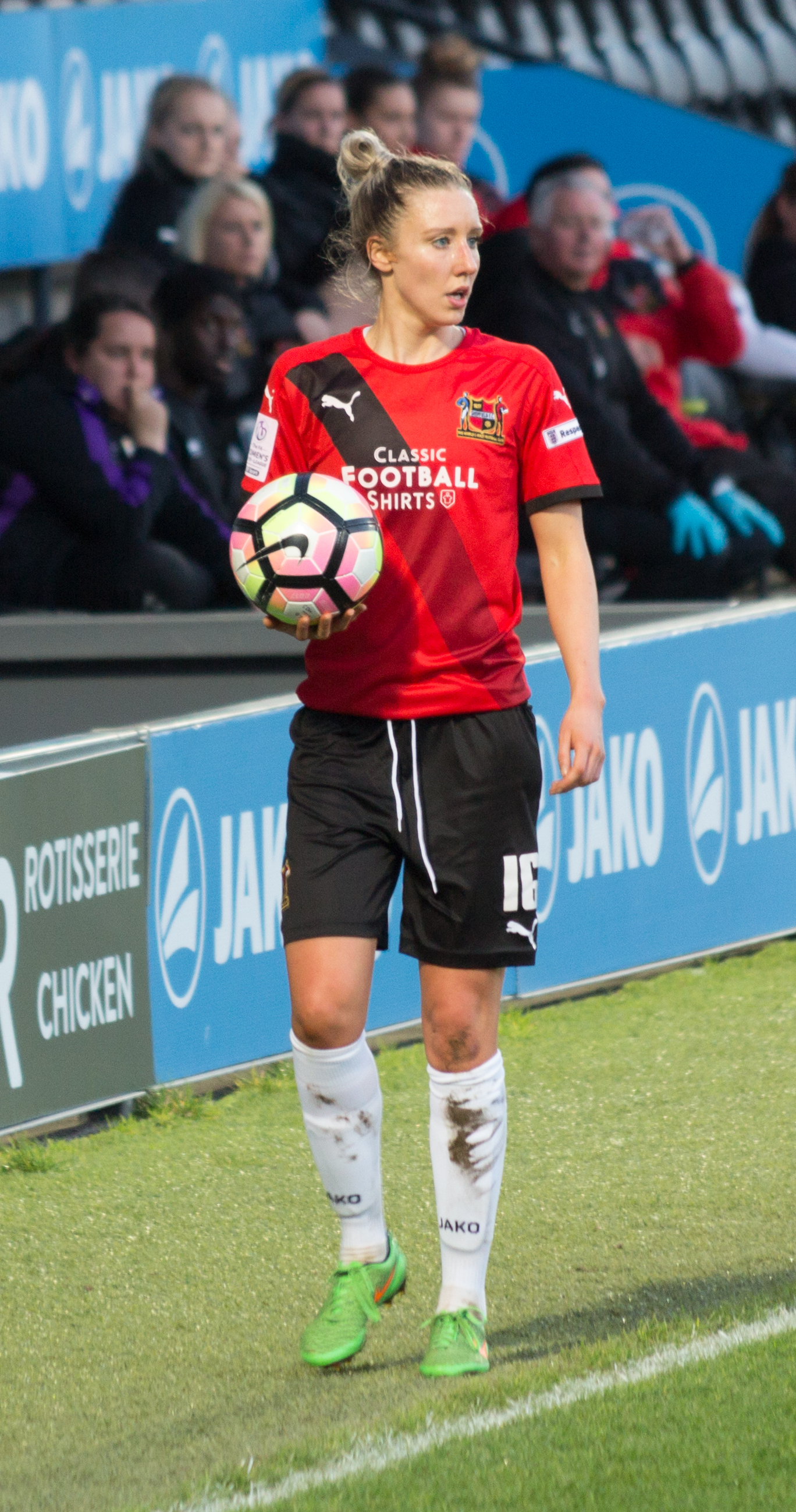

Personal information
- Full name: Emma Louise Lipman
- Date of birth: 23 February 1989 (age 37)
- Place of birth: Nuneaton, England
- Height: 1.75 m (5 ft 9 in)
- Position: Defender

Team information
- Current team: Valletta

Youth career
- Coventry City

Senior career*
Years	Team	Apps	(Gls)
2003–2007	Coventry City		
2009–2011	Leeds City Vixens		
2011–2013	Leeds United		
2014–2015	Manchester City	15	(0)
2016–2017	Sheffield FC		
2017–2018	AGSM Verona	21	(0)
2018–2019	Roma	17	(1)
2019–2020	Florentia	12	(0)
2020–2021	Lazio	16	(1)
2021–2024	Como	56	(1)
2024–2026	Genoa	34	(1)
2026—	Valletta	0	(0)

International career^{‡}
2019–	Malta	46	(1)
- * Club domestic league appearances and goals as of 09:54, 30 July 2026 (UTC) ‡ National team caps and goals as of 09:55, 30 July 2026 (UTC)

Emma Louise Lipman (born 23 February 1989) is a professional footballer who plays as a defender for Valletta. Born in England, Lipman represents Malta at international level.

== Club career ==
Lipman joined Coventry City as a 10-year-old and was playing in their first team by the time she was 14 years old. After moving to Yorkshire to attend Leeds Beckett University, Lipman represented Leeds City Vixens and Leeds United in the FA Women's Premier League.

In July 2013 Lipman transferred to Manchester City. When Sheikh Mansour-backed Manchester City successfully bid for an FA WSL franchise in 2014, they handed Lipman a professional contract.

Lipman won a contract extension for Manchester City's 2015 season, but the club's purchase of England full-backs Lucy Bronze and Demi Stokes reduced her opportunities to play. In February 2016 she joined Sheffield FC, who had just been promoted into WSL 2.

In 2017 Lipman accepted an offer to play in Italy, with AGSM Verona. She featured in 21 of 22 league fixtures as the club secured a mid-table finish in Serie A. That prompted Roma to sign Lipman for their newly formed women's team. After playing in 17 of Roma's 22 2018–19 Serie A games, contributing one goal, Lipman signed for another Italian club Florentia San Gimignano in July 2019.

In July 2020 Lipman and her Maltese teammate Rachel Cuschieri signed for Lazio, who had narrowly missed promotion to Serie A the previous season.

On 15 June 2026, Lipman joined Maltese Women's League side Valletta.

== International career ==
As well as England, Lipman was also eligible for the national teams of Scotland and Malta due to her grandparents. In May 2019 Lipman received a call-up to Malta's squad for a friendly match against Bolton Wanderers. She started Malta's 2–1 win at the Malta Football Association training grounds in Ta' Qali.

On 4 October 2019 Lipman won her first official cap for Malta, in a home UEFA Women's Euro 2021 qualifying Group B fixture against Italy. Although Lipman's handball conceded an injury time penalty kick, converted by Cristiana Girelli, Malta received credit for their "brave display" in their 2–0 defeat against Italy. Lipman retained her place in the team for the next qualifier, a 1–1 draw with Israel.

== International goals ==
No.	Date	Venue	Opponent	Score	Result	Competition
1.	6 September 2022	Camp FSCG, Podgorica, Montenegro	Montenegro	2–0	2–0	2023 FIFA Women's World Cup qualification

== Honours ==
Manchester City

- Women's League Cup: 2014
