= Alishia Sultana =

Maltese footballer

Personal information
- Date of birth: 9 April 1997 (age 29)
- Place of birth: Malta,
- Position: Midfielder

Team information
- Current team: Birkirkara

International career^{‡}
Years	Team	Apps	(Gls)
2014-	Malta	61	(2)
- ‡ National team caps and goals as of 9 August 2025

Alishia Sultana (born 9 April 1997) is a Maltese footballer who plays as a midfielder for Birkirkara and has appeared for the Malta women's national team.

== Career ==
Sultana has been capped for the Malta national team, appearing for the team during the 2019 FIFA Women's World Cup qualifying cycle.

== International goals ==
No.	Date	Venue	Opponent	Score	Result	Competition
1.	22 February 2025	Tony Bezzina Stadium, Paola, Malta	Faroe Islands	1–0	2–0	Friendly
