= Ylenia Carabott =

Maltese footballer

Personal information
- Full name: Ylenia Carabott
- Date of birth: 2 March 1989 (age 37)
- Place of birth: Floriana, Malta
- Height: 1.67 m (5 ft 6 in)
- Position: Forward

Team information
- Current team: London Seaward

Senior career*
Years	Team	Apps	(Gls)
2004–2018	Hibernians	237	(328)
2018–2019	Birkirkara	24	(14)
2019–2020	Chievo Verona	11	(2)
2020–2021	Charleroi	11	(1)
2021–2022	Keynsham Town	14	(0)
2022-2023	Gillingham	6	(2)
2023-	London Seaward	7	(2)

International career^{‡}
2007–	Malta	97	(20)
- * Club domestic league appearances and goals as of 9 January 2024 (UTC) ‡ National team caps and goals as of 9 August 2025

Ylenia Carabott (born 2 March 1989) is a Maltese football forward who plays for Women's National League Southern Premier Division side Gillingham. During her time in Malta with Hibernians, she won the top scorer award for 9 times and in 8 consecutive seasons. She also finished runner up in the best player award in 3 seasons and was nominated for the Malta Sportswoman of the year award where she was among the top 5 shortlisted candidates.

== Club career ==
In her home country, Carabott has played for Raiders, Hibernians and Birkirkara, winning a series of league and cup titles.

Outside of Malta, she has had spells with Swedish sides Alby FF and Ange IF, and Italian Serie B side Chievo. In August 2020, she signed for Belgian First Division team Charleroi.

In September 2021, Carabott joined English club Keynsham Town, but failed to score in 14 league appearances for the side as they were relegated from the National League Southern Premier Division. In July 2022 she signed for English club Gillingham of the National League Southern Premier Division.

== Honours ==
Hibernians

- Maltese Women's League: 2004–05, 2005–06, 2006–07, 2008–09, 2014–15, 2015–16
- Malta Women's Knock Out: 2005–06, 2014–15, 2015–16
- Malta Women's Super Cup: 2006–07, 2007–08, 2012–13, 2013–14, 2014–15, 2015–16, 2016–17

Birkirkara

- Maltese Women's League: 2018–19
- Malta Women's Knock Out: 2018–19
- Malta Women's Super Cup: 2018–19

Individual

- Maltese Women's League Top Scorer: 2006–07, 2008–09, 2009–2010, 2010–11, 2011–12, 2012–13, 2013–14, 2014–15, 2015–16, 2016–17

== See also ==
- List of Malta women's international footballers
