= Jelena Vujadinović =

Montenegrin footballer

Personal information
- Date of birth: 17 November 2000 (age 25)
- Position: Striker

Team information
- Current team: Breznica

Senior career*
Years	Team	Apps	(Gls)
- Ekonomist
2018–2020	Breznica		
2021–2023	Breznica	15	(23)
2023	TSC		
2023–2024	Medyk Konin	14	(2)
2024–	Breznica		

International career^{‡}
2015–2016	Montenegro U17	6	(1)
2017–2018	Montenegro U19	9	(2)
2017–	Montenegro	42	(6)
- * Club domestic league appearances and goals as of 23 March 2024 ‡ National team caps and goals as of 15 August 2025

Jelena Vujadinović (born 17 November 2000) is a Montenegrin footballer who plays as a striker for Breznica and the Montenegro women's national team.

== Career ==
Vujadinović has been capped for the Montenegro national team, appearing for the team during the UEFA Women's Euro 2021 qualifying cycle.

== International goals ==
Scores and results list Montenegro's goal tally first.

No.	Date	Venue	Opponent	Score	Result	Competition
1.	21 February 2021	Camp FSCG, Podgorica, Montenegro	North Macedonia	5–0	5–0	Friendly
2.	1 September 2022	Viborg Stadion, Viborg, Denmark	Denmark	1–1	1–5	2023 FIFA Women's World Cup qualification
3.	15 February 2023	Camp FSCG, Podgorica, Montenegro	Moldova	4–1	6–1	Friendly
4.	10 April 2023	Camp FSCG, Podgorica, Montenegro	North Macedonia	3–1	3–1	Friendly
5.	1 December 2023	Podgorica City Stadium, Podgorica, Montenegro	Faroe Islands	7–0	9–0	2023–24 UEFA Women's Nations League
6.	1 December 2023	Podgorica City Stadium, Podgorica, Montenegro	Faroe Islands	8–0	9–0	2023–24 UEFA Women's Nations League
