= Charlene Zammit =

Maltese footballer (born 1991)

Personal information
- Date of birth: 18 January 1991 (age 35)
- Position: Defender

Team information
- Current team: Birkirkara

Senior career*
Years	Team	Apps	(Gls)
2014-2018	Hibernians		
2018-2020	Swieqi United		
2021-	Birkirkara		

International career^{‡}
	Malta	105	(2)
- * Club domestic league appearances and goals ‡ National team caps and goals as of 1 August 2025

Charlene Zammit (born 18 January 1991) is a Maltese footballer who plays as a defender for Birkirkara and the Malta women's national team.

== Career ==
Zammit appeared for the Malta national team during the 2019 FIFA Women's World Cup qualifying cycle. On 25 October 2024, she earned her 100th cap during a 5–0 defeat to Italy.

== International Goals ==
No.	Date	Venue	Opponent	Score	Result	Competition
1	10 February 2017		Lithuania	1–0	1–0	Friendly
2	16 February 2022	Hibernians Stadium, Paola, Malta	Moldova	3–1	3–1	2022 Malta International Tournament

== See also ==
- List of Malta women's international footballers
