= Maria Farrugia =

Maltese footballer

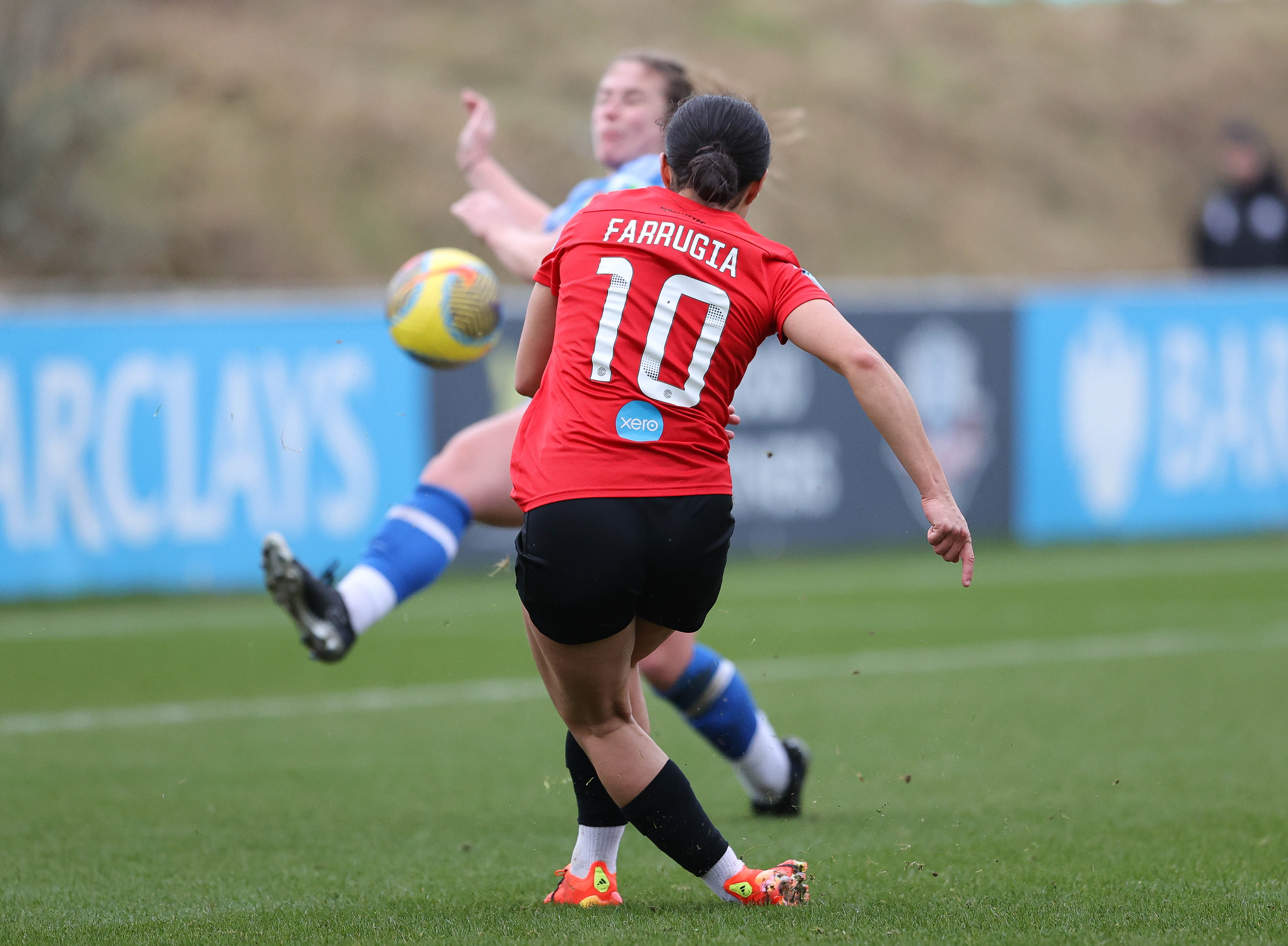
- Maria Farrugia in 2024

Personal information
- Date of birth: 9 January 2001 (age 25)
- Place of birth: Gozo, Malta
- Height: 1.62 m (5 ft 4 in)
- Position: Forward

Team information
- Current team: Bristol City
- Number: 19

Senior career*
Years	Team	Apps	(Gls)
2019–2022	Sunderland	57	(17)
2022–2023	Durham	21	(0)
2023–2024	Lewes	25	(3)
2024–2025	Sheffield United	25	(8)
2025–	Bristol City	40	(7)

International career^{‡}
2016–2017	Malta U17	6	(3)
2018	Malta U19	3	(0)
2019–	Malta	64	(14)
- * Club domestic league appearances and goals as of 8:32, 15 February 2026 (UTC) ‡ National team caps and goals as of 15 February 2026

Maria Farrugia (born 9 January 2001) is a Maltese footballer who plays as a forward for Bristol City in the Women's Super League 2 and for the Malta women's national team.

== Club career ==
Growing up on the island of Gozo, Farrugia began playing football at the age of four. She would play on boys' teams until the U15 level. At the age of 11, she was selected to join the Malta Football Association national youth teams, having to take the ferry to commute from Gozo to the main island.

After graduating from the National Sport School, Malta, she moved to the UK, where she began training with Sunderland AFC's Foundation of Light. In 2019, she signed with Sunderland AFC Ladies, making her debut with the club in mid-February 2019.

In July 2021, she signed a one-year extension with Sunderland. She was named the FA Women's Championship Player of the Week for the first week of the 2021–22 season.

After departing Sunderland at the end of the 2021–22 season, Farrugia joined Durham in August 2022.

At the end of June 2023, Lewes FC Women announced that she would be joining their team. She won the league goal of the month for January 2024, as well as the player of the month for March 2024 with Lewes FC Women.

On 19 August 2024, Farrugia was announced at Sheffield United. Farrugia shortly after won both the player of the month and the goal of the month for October 2024 with Sheffield United. She also won the goal of the month for November 2024. Farrugia's goal of the month for October 2024 against Bristol City ended up being the goal of the season. She was nominated for the 2024-25 Women's Championship Player of the Season award.

On 22 July 2025, it was announced that Farrugia had signed a two-year contract with Women's Super League 2 side Bristol City.

== International career ==
Farrugia has been capped for the Malta national team, making her debut in 2019.

== International goals ==
No.	Date	Venue	Opponent	Score	Result	Competition
1.	7 November 2019	Centenary Stadium, Ta' Qali, Malta	Israel	1–0	1–1	UEFA Women's Euro 2022 qualifying
2.	21 September 2021	Centenary Stadium, Ta' Qali, Malta	Bosnia and Herzegovina	1–2	2–2	2023 FIFA Women's World Cup qualification
3.	6 September 2022	Camp FSCG, Podgorica, Montenegro	Montenegro	1–0	2–0	2023 FIFA Women's World Cup qualification
4.	7 April 2023	Sportland Arena, Tallinn, Estonia	Estonia	2–1	2–1	Friendly
5.	27 October 2023	Centenary Stadium, Ta' Qali, Malta	Andorra	4–0	5–0	2023–24 UEFA Women's Nations League
6.	5 December 2023	Centenary Stadium, Ta' Qali, Malta	Latvia	2–1	2–1	2023–24 UEFA Women's Nations League
7.	4 June 2024	Bosnia and Herzegovina FA Training Centre, Zenica, Bosnia and Herzegovina	Bosnia and Herzegovina	1–0	1–2	UEFA Women's Euro 2025 qualifying
8.	16 July 2024	Estádio Dr. Magalhães Pessoa, Leiria, Portugal	Portugal	1–1	1–3	UEFA Women's Euro 2025 qualifying
9.	4 April 2025	Mikheil Meskhi Stadium, Tbilisi, Georgia	Georgia	1–0	3–2	2025 UEFA Women's Nations League
10.	4 April 2025	Mikheil Meskhi Stadium, Tbilisi, Georgia	Georgia	3–0	3–2	2025 UEFA Women's Nations League
11.	28 November 2025	Centenary Stadium, Ta' Qali, Malta	Croatia	3–2	3–2	Friendly
12.	7 March 2026	Centenary Stadium, Ta' Qali, Malta	Switzerland	1–2	1–4	2027 FIFA Women's World Cup qualification
13.	18 April 2026	Centenary Stadium, Ta' Qali, Malta	Northern Ireland	1–1	2–4	2027 FIFA Women's World Cup qualification
