= Dionne Tonna =

Maltese footballer

Personal information
- Date of birth: 26 September 1983 (age 43)
- Position: Midfielder

Senior career*
Years	Team	Apps	(Gls)
Jan1999–1999	Rabat Ajax	16	(8)
1999–2018	Hibernians	272	(108)

International career^{‡}
2003–2014	Malta	25	(1)
- * Club domestic league appearances and goals ‡ National team caps and goals as of 17 September 2014

Dionne Tonna (born 26 September 1983) is a Maltese former footballer who played as a midfielder. She has been a member of the Malta women's national team, playing 25 games for the national team after missing 8 years of football through injury. Following her retirement as a footballer, she has studied her coaching licences and now forms part of the national women's team as an assistant coach.
