= Natasha Pace =

Maltese footballer

Personal information
- Date of birth: 10 December 1974 (age 51)
- Position: Defender

Team information
- Current team: Mosta

Senior career*
| Years | Team | Apps | (Gls) |
| –201? | Mosta | | |
| 201?–2018 | Mġarr United | 18+ | (2+) |
| 2018– | Mosta | 13 | (0) |

International career^{‡}
| 2003–2014 | Malta | 48 | (3) |
- * Club domestic league appearances and goals ‡ National team caps and goals as of 17 September 2014

Natasha Pace (born December 10, 1974) is a Maltese footballer who plays as a defender for First Division club Mosta FC. She has been a member of the Malta women's national team.

Pace starred in the Matla women's performance in the first international football match that the team did not lose. Pace provided the assist for Malta's only goal in the 1-1 draw against Bosnia Herzegovina in Malta's final 2007 World Cup qualifier. This was Malta's first-ever drawn match, which earned the team their first point in the qualifiers.
