= Stephania Farrugia =

Maltese footballer (born 1991)

Stefania Farrugia
Personal information
- Date of birth: 11 September 1991 (age 35)
- Place of birth: Malta,
- Height: 1.64 m (5 ft 5 in)
- Position: Defender

Team information
- Current team: Birkirkara

Senior career*
Years	Team	Apps	(Gls)
2007-	Birkirkara		

International career^{‡}
2013-	Malta	103	(5)
- * Club domestic league appearances and goals ‡ National team caps and goals as of 1 August 2025

Stefania Farrugia (born 11 September 1991) is a Maltese footballer who plays as a defender for Birkirkara and has appeared for the Malta women's national team.

== Career ==
Farrugia has been capped for the Malta national team, appearing for the team, besides other competitions, during the 2019 FIFA Women's World Cup qualifying cycle.

== International goals ==
No.	Date	Venue	Opponent	Score	Result	Competition
1.	21 September 2021	Centenary Stadium, Ta'Qali, Malta	Bosnia and Herzegovina	2–2	2–2	2023 FIFA Women's World Cup qualification
2.	7 April 2022	Sportland Arena, Tallinn, Estonia	Estonia	2–1	2–1	Friendly
3.	27 October 2023	Centenary Stadium, Ta'Qali, Malta	Andorra	2–0	5–0	2023–24 UEFA Women's Nations League
