= Gabriella Zahra =

Maltese footballer

Personal information
- Date of birth: 2 May 1991 (age 35)
- Position: Midfielder

Senior career*
Years	Team	Apps	(Gls)
2009-2011	Melita		
2011-	Birkirkara		

International career^{‡}
	Malta	60	(1)
- * Club domestic league appearances and goals ‡ National team caps and goals as of 1 August 2025

Gabriella Zahra (born 2 May 1991) is a Maltese footballer who plays as a midfielder and has appeared for the Malta women's national team.

== Career ==
Zahra Pedia has been capped for the Malta national team, appearing for the team during the 2019 FIFA Women's World Cup qualifying cycle.

== See also ==
- List of Malta women's international footballers
