= Janice Xuereb =

Maltese goalkeeper

Personal information
- Date of birth: 1 August 1996 (age 30)
- Height: 1.60 m (5 ft 3 in)
- Position: Goalkeeper

Senior career*
Years	Team	Apps	(Gls)
2011-	Birkirkara		

International career^{‡}
	Malta	73	(0)
- * Club domestic league appearances and goals as of 19:44, 30 August 2019 (UTC) ‡ National team caps and goals as of 9 August 2025

Janice Xuereb (born 1 August 1996) is a Maltese footballer who plays as a goalkeeper and has appeared for the Malta women's national team.

== Career ==
Xuereb has been capped for the Malta national team, having appeared for the team, among other matches, during the 2019 FIFA Women's World Cup qualifying cycle.
