= Maya Lucia =

Maltese footballer (born 2003)

Personal information
- Date of birth: 6 July 2003 (age 23)
- Height: 1.62 m (5 ft 4 in)
- Position: Midfielder

Senior career*
Years	Team	Apps	(Gls)
–2022	Lija Athletic		
2022–2023	Genoa	14	(0)
2023–2024	ŽNK Split		
2024	ŽNK Osijek		
2024–2025	AP Orlen Gdańsk	4	(0)
2025–2026	Apollon Ladies F.C.		

International career^{‡}
- Malta U17
- Malta U19
2021–	Malta	13	(0)
- * Club domestic league appearances and goals as of 12 June 2025 ‡ National team caps and goals as of 12 June 2025

Maya Lucia (born 6 July 2003) is a Maltese professional footballer who plays as a midfielder for the Malta women's national team.

== Early life ==
Lucia started playing football at the age of ten.

== Club career ==
Lucia played for Maltese side Lija Raiders, where she was regarded as one of the club's most important players. In 2021, she suffered racist abuse from Mosta FC supporters during an under-19 league match, in which she also scored her team's winning goal.

== International career ==
Lucia has been described as "one of the most promising footballers in Malta". She has captained the Malta women's national under-19 football team.

== Style of play ==
Lucia has operated as a central midfielder while playing for her club while operating as a defensive midfielder while playing for the Malta women's national football team.

== Personal life ==
Lucia is of Nigerian descent.
