= Manuela Tesse =

Italian footballer (born 1976)

Personal information
- Date of birth: 28 February 1976 (age 50)
- Place of birth: Sassari, Italy
- Position: Midfielder

International career^{‡}
| Years | Team | Apps | (Gls) |
- Italy
- ‡ National team caps and goals as of 19 June 1999 (before the 1999 FIFA Women's World Cup)

Manuela Tesse (born 28 February 1976 in Sassari) is an Italian footballer who played as a midfielder for the Italy women's national football team. She was part of the team at the UEFA Women's Euro 1997, 1999 FIFA Women's World Cup and UEFA Women's Euro 2001.
