= Brenda Borg =

Maltese footballer (born 1997)

Personal information
- Full name: Brenda Borg
- Date of birth: 1 May 1997 (age 29)
- Place of birth: Malta,
- Position: Forward

Team information
- Current team: Valletta F.C.

Senior career*
Years	Team	Apps	(Gls)
2017-2026	Mġarr United		
2026-	Valletta F.C.		

International career^{‡}
2013-2015	Malta U19	6	(0)
2013-	Malta	79	(5)
- * Club domestic league appearances and goals as of 19:10, 28 April 2020 (UTC) ‡ National team caps and goals as of 8 August 2025

Brenda Borg (born 1 May 1997) is a Maltese footballer who plays as a midfielder and has appeared for the Malta women's national team and previously for the national U-19 team.

== Career ==
Borg has been capped for the Malta national team, appearing for the team during the UEFA Women's Euro 2021 qualifying cycle.

== International goals ==
No.	Date	Venue	Opponent	Score	Result	Competition
1.	10 March 2020	Centenary Stadium, Ta'Qali, Malta	Bosnia and Herzegovina	2–3	2–3	UEFA Women's Euro 2022 qualifying
1.	1 December 2020	Ramat Gan Stadium, Ramat Gan, Israel	Israel	1–0	2–0	UEFA Women's Euro 2022 qualifying
2.	25 February 2024	Tony Bezzina Stadium, Paola, Malta	Belarus	1–0	1–1	Friendly

== See also ==
- List of Malta women's international footballers
