= Jade Flask =

Maltese footballer

Personal information
- Date of birth: 4 August 1996 (age 30)
- Place of birth: Malta
- Position: Midfielder

Team information
- Current team: Swieqi United

Senior career*
Years	Team	Apps	(Gls)
- Hibernians
2015	Ånge IF		
2015-2020	Hibernians		
2021-	Swieqi United		

International career^{‡}
2013	Malta U19	12	(0)
2014-	Malta	67	(7)
- * Club domestic league appearances and goals as of 19:44, 30 August 2019 (UTC) ‡ National team caps and goals as of 19:44, 30 August 2019 (UTC)

Jade Flask (born 4 August 1996) is a Maltese footballer who plays as a midfielder and has appeared for the Malta women's national team.

== Career ==
Flask has been capped for the Malta national team, appearing for the team during the 2019 FIFA Women's World Cup qualifying cycle.

In May 2023, she received the prestigious Malta Football Association Player of the Year award.

== International goals ==
No.	Date	Venue	Opponent	Score	Result	Competition
1.	11 April 2017	Selman Stërmasi Stadium, Tirana, Albania	Kosovo	2–0	3–1	2019 FIFA Women's World Cup qualification
2.	13 June 2021	Centenary Stadium, Ta'Qali, Malta	Montenegro	1–0	1–0	Friendly
3.	16 February 2022	Hibernians Stadium, Paola, Malta	Moldova	2–1	3–1	2022 Malta International Tournament
4.	20 February 2023	Centenary Stadium, Ta'Qali, Malta	Luxembourg	3–1	3–1	Friendly

== Personal life ==
As of May 2025, Flask is in a relationship with the Maltese singer Miriana Conte.
