= Shona Zammit =

Maltese footballer

Personal information
- Full name: Shona Zammit
- Date of birth: 15 June 1996 (age 30)
- Position: Midfielder

Senior career*
Years	Team	Apps	(Gls)
2014–2019	Hibernians		
2019–2020	Bari	15	(1)
2020-	Swieqi United		

International career^{‡}
2013–2014	Malta U19	6	(0)
2014–	Malta	88	(7)
- * Club domestic league appearances and goals as of 21 August 2019 ‡ National team caps and goals as of 1 August 2025

Shona Zammit (born 15 June 1996) is a Maltese footballer who plays as a midfielder for the Malta women's national team. She has also represented Malta at the U19 level.

== Honours ==
Hibernians

- Maltese First Division: 2014–15, 2015–16

== See also ==
- List of Malta women's international footballers
