= Dorianne Theuma =

Maltese footballer (born 1984)

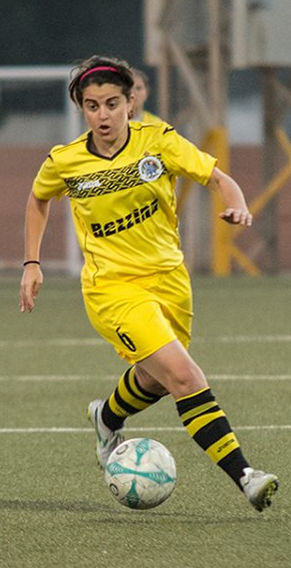
- Theuma with Hibernians in 2015

Personal information
- Date of birth: 17 May 1984 (age 42)
- Place of birth: Malta
- Position: Midfielder

Team information
- Current team: Swieqi United (Head Coach)

Senior career*
| Years | Team | Apps | (Gls) |
| 1997–2008 | Hibernians | | |
| 2008–2013 | Mosta | | |
| 2013–2019 | Hibernians | | |
| 2019–2024 | Swieqi United | | |

International career
| 2003–2024 | Malta | 118 | (26) |

Managerial career
- 2024–: Swieqi United
- * Club domestic league appearances and goals

Dorianne Theuma (born 17 May 1984) is a Maltese former footballer who is the head coach of Swieqi United's women's team. She was a member of the Malta national team.

== International career ==
Theuma's contribution to the team performance was praised as the Malta national team won their first ever match in international football, beating Estonia 1–0 on 29 June 2008.

== Career statistics ==
=== International ===
| No. | Date | Venue | Opponent | Score | Result | Competition |
|---|---|---|---|---|---|---|
| 1. | 4 April 2013 | Centenary Stadium, Ta'Qali, Malta | Albania | 1–1 | 1–1 | 2015 FIFA Women's World Cup qualification |
| 2. | 6 April 2013 | Centenary Stadium, Ta'Qali, Malta | Luxembourg | 2–0 | 6–0 | 2015 FIFA Women's World Cup qualification |
| 3. | 6 April 2013 | Centenary Stadium, Ta'Qali, Malta | Luxembourg | 6–0 | 6–0 | 2015 FIFA Women's World Cup qualification |
| 4. | 9 April 2013 | Centenary Stadium, Ta'Qali, Malta | Latvia | 1–0 | 2–0 | 2015 FIFA Women's World Cup qualification |
| 5. | 4 April 2015 | Victor Tedesco Stadium, Ħamrun, Malta | Andorra | 3–1 | 5–3 | UEFA Women's Euro 2017 qualifying |
| 6. | 4 April 2015 | Victor Tedesco Stadium, Ħamrun, Malta | Andorra | 5–1 | 5–3 | UEFA Women's Euro 2017 qualifying |
| 7. | 6 April 2015 | Victor Tedesco Stadium, Ħamrun, Malta | Georgia | 2–1 | 2–1 | UEFA Women's Euro 2017 qualifying |
| 8. | 11 April 2017 | Selman Stërmasi Stadium, Tirana, Albania | Kosovo | 3–0 | 3–1 | 2019 FIFA Women's World Cup qualification |
| 9. | 26 October 2021 | ASK Arena, Baku, Azerbaijan | Azerbaijan | 1–0 | 2–1 | 2023 FIFA Women's World Cup qualification |

== Honours ==
Mosta FC

- Maltese First Division runner-up: 2011–12, 2012–13
