= Emma Xuerreb =

Maltese footballer

Emma Xuereb
Personal information
- Full name: Emma Xuereb
- Date of birth: 5 January 1992 (age 34)
- Place of birth: Gozo, Malta
- Position: Defender

Team information
- Current team: Hibernians

Senior career*
Years	Team	Apps	(Gls)
2008–2010	Gozo Women		
2010–2013	Mosta	3	(0)
2013–2015	Raiders Luxol		
2015–2017	Hibernians	5	(1)
2019	Hibernians		
2019–2024	Swieqi United		
2024	Hibernians	0	(0)
2024–	Swieqi United	18	(0)

International career^{‡}
2009–	Malta	84	(4)
- * Club domestic league appearances and goals as of 1 August 2025 ‡ National team caps and goals as of 1 August 2025

Emma Xuereb, or Emma Xuerreb, (born 5 January 1992) is a Maltese footballer who plays as a defender for Hibernians and Malta.

== Club career ==
=== Gozo United ===
Emma Xuereb has played for several clubs across Malta, and she began her career at Gozo Women in 2008.

=== Mosta ===
She then moved to Mosta and made three appearances between 2010 and 2013 while winning the Maltese First Division once and being runners-up twice.

=== Raiders Luxol ===
She joined Raiders Luxol in 2013.

=== Hibernians (first and second spells) ===
She joined Hibernians for the first time in 2015 before re-joining in 2019.

=== Swieqi United ===
In June 2022, Swieqi United announced extending Xuereb's contract for another two years.

=== Hibernians (third spell) ===
After her contract ended at Swieqi United, she joined Hibernians in 2024 for her third spell at the club aged 32.

== International career ==
Emma Xuereb debuted for Malta in 2009 and scored her first goal on 5 June 2009 during a 4–0 victory against Latvia in a friendly match.

== International goals ==
No.	Date	Venue	Opponent	Score	Result	Competition
1.	5 June 2009	Centenary Stadium, Ta' Qali, Malta	Latvia	2–0	4–0	Friendly
2.	6 April 2013	National Stadium, Ta' Qali, Malta	Luxembourg	5–0	6–0	2015 FIFA Women's World Cup qualification
3.	10 March 2020	Centenary Stadium, Ta' Qali, Malta	Bosnia and Herzegovina	1–3	2–3	UEFA Women's Euro 2022 qualifying
4.	26 October 2021	ASK Arena, Baku, Azerbaijan	Azerbaijan	2–0	2–1	2023 FIFA Women's World Cup qualification

== Honours ==
Mosta FC

Winner

- Maltese First Division: 2010–11

Runners-up

- Maltese First Division: 2011–12, 2012–13

Hibernians WFC

Winner

- Maltese First Division: 2015–16

Runners-up

- Maltese First Division: 2016–17, 2017–18
