= Rachel Cuschieri =

Maltese footballer (born 1992)

Personal information
- Date of birth: 26 April 1992 (age 34)
- Place of birth: Pietà, Malta
- Height: 1.58 m (5 ft 2 in)
- Position: Midfielder

Team information
- Current team: Genoa CFC
- Number: 10

Youth career
- 1996–2004: San Gwann

Senior career*
Years	Team	Apps	(Gls)
2004–2014	Birkirkara		
2014–2017	Apollon Limassol	36	(48)
2017–2018	RSC Anderlecht		
2018–2020	PSV	13	(2)
2020–2022	Lazio	42	(4)
2022–2024	Sampdoria	46	(0)
2024–	Genoa	15	(0)

International career^{‡}
2009–	Malta	107	(15)
- * Club domestic league appearances and goals as of 1 August 2025 ‡ National team caps and goals as of 1 August 2025

Rachel Cuschieri (born 26 April 1992) is a Maltese professional footballer who plays as a midfielder for Italian Serie B club Genoa CFC and the Malta women's national team. She first played in the Champions League in 2010.

== Early life ==
Rachel began playing football at the age of five with San Gwann Football Nursery. She trained up to the age of 13 with the boys' team being the only girl in that age group. San Gwann Football Nursery does not have a ladies football team and her development could not progress any further due to restrictions in place within the Maltese footballing authorities that, although she was still a minor she could not play competitive games. Birkirkara F.C.'s women's team became aware of her potential and signed her.

== Playing career ==
=== Club ===
Within a few months of joining the club, Rachel was playing with the Birkirkara first team at the age of 13.

During the summer of 2014, she became the first Maltese female professional footballer to play outside Malta, when she signed for Cypriot side Apollon Limassol.

=== International ===
Cuschieri was selected for the Malta women's national football team and made her debut against Switzerland at the age of 14, which at the time was a record.

During the 2013 European Championship qualifying's preliminary stage, Cuschieri scored against Armenia. She is currently the leading all-time scorer for and the youngest-ever goal scorer.

On 16 July 2024, Cuschieri made her 100th appearance for Malta in a 3–1 defeat to Portugal.

== International goals ==
No.	Date	Venue	Opponent	Score	Result	Competition
1.	8 March 2011	National Stadium, Ta' Qali, Malta	Armenia	1–0	1–1	UEFA Women's Euro 2013 qualifying
2.	6 April 2013	National Stadium, Ta' Qali, Malta	Luxembourg	3–0	6–0	2015 FIFA Women's World Cup qualification
3.	9 April 2013	National Stadium, Ta' Qali, Malta	Latvia	2–0	2–0	2015 FIFA Women's World Cup qualification
4.	4 April 2015	Victor Tedesco Stadium, Ħamrun, Malta	Andorra	1–1	5–3	UEFA Women's Euro 2017 qualifying
5.	4 April 2015	Victor Tedesco Stadium, Ħamrun, Malta	Andorra	2–1	5–3	UEFA Women's Euro 2017 qualifying
6.	11 April 2017	Selman Stërmasi Stadium, Tirana, Albania	Kosovo	1–0	3–1	2019 FIFA Women's World Cup qualification
7.	5 March 2020	Centenary Stadium, Ta' Qali, Malta	Georgia	1–0	2–1	UEFA Women's Euro 2022 qualifying
8.	27 October 2023	Centenary Stadium, Ta' Qali, Malta	Andorra	5–0	5–0	2023–24 UEFA Women's Nations League
9.	8 April 2025	Centenary Stadium, Ta' Qali, Malta	Georgia	1–0	2–1	2025 UEFA Women's Nations League

== Honours ==
Birkirkara

- Maltese League (5): 2006/07, 2008/09, 2009/10, 2011/12, 2012/13
- Maltese Cup (8): 2004/05, 2006/07, 2007/08, 2008/09, 2009/10, 2010/11, 2012/13, 2013/14

Apollon

- Cypriot First Division (3): 2014/15, 2015/16, 2016/17
- Cypriot Cup (3): 2014/15, 2015/16. 2016/17
- Cypriot Super Cup (2): 2015, 2017

Anderlecht

- Belgian Super League (1): 2017/18

Lazio

- Serie B (1): 2020/21
