= Nicole Sciberras =

Maltese footballer (born 2001)

Personal information
- Date of birth: 28 April 2001 (age 25)
- Place of birth: Malta,
- Position: Defender

Team information
- Current team: Hibernians

Youth career
- –2017: Mosta
- 2019–: Juventus

Senior career*
Years	Team	Apps	(Gls)
2017–2019	Grifone	39	(0)
2019–2021	Juventus	0	(0)
2021–2022	Tavagnacco		
2022-	Hibernians		

International career^{‡}
2016–2017	Malta U17	6	(0)
2018	Malta U19	3	(0)
2019–	Malta	52	(0)
- * Club domestic league appearances and goals as of 00:25, 24 September 2022 (UTC) ‡ National team caps and goals as of 9 August 2025

Nicole Sciberras (born 28 April 2001) is a Maltese footballer who plays as a defender for Maltese club Hibernians and the Malta national team.

== International career ==
Sciberras has been capped for the Malta national team, appearing for the team during the UEFA Women's Euro 2021 qualifying cycle. She has also represented Malta's U17 and U19 teams.

== Honours ==
- Serie A: 2020–21
