= Camp FSCG =

Sports facility in Montenegro

Football Association of Montenegro Camp
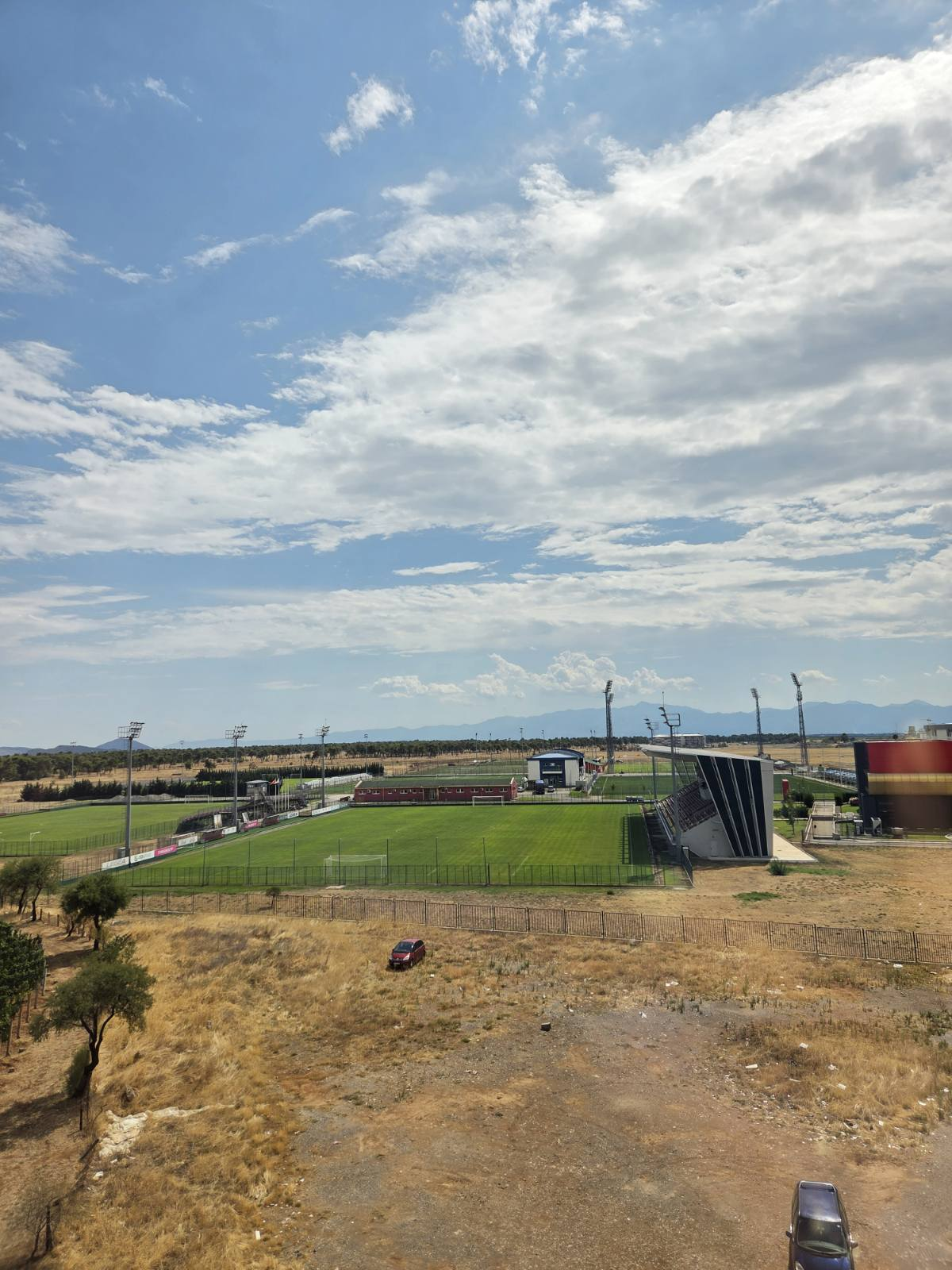
- Interactive map of Football Association of Montenegro Camp
- Location: Stari Aerodrom; Podgorica, Montenegro
- Coordinates: 42.427835°N 19.282337°E
- Owner: FSCG, FK Budućnost, OFK Titograd
- Type: Football training ground, stadiums

Construction
- Opened: 2007
- Cost: 5,500,000 €

Website
- fscg.me/savez/investicije/investicije-fudbalskog-saveza

Football Association of Montenegro Camp, commonly referred to as simply Camp FSCG, is the training facility and stadiums complex in Podgorica, Montenegro. It is operated by the Football Association of Montenegro, whose seat (House of Football) is inside the complex. Parts of the camp are ownership of FK Budućnost, FK Mladost, FK Ribnica and FK Grafičar.

== History ==
Built in 2007, the centre consists of 54,000 m^{2} (580,000 sq ft). It is located on Ćemovsko polje, a plain at Podgorica outskirts between the settlements Stari Aerodrom and Konik. It consists on six pitches with stands and floodlights, and House of Football - a seat of the Football Association of Montenegro.

Camp currently represents an important asset for the whole Montenegrin football system. Its grounds are home to all Montenegrin national teams (men and women) and numerous teams from Podgorica. Fields meets the criteria for Montenegrin First League games and UEFA competitions for young players.

== Facilities ==
=== House of Football ===
House of Football (Kuća fudbala) is a seat of Football Association of Montenegro. Building was opened on 21 May 2016.
On 3,240 sq meters, the building have modern facilities like reception, museum, press hall, TV FSCG seat, administrative offices and meeting rooms.

=== FSCG training grounds ===
Behind the House of Football are two football pitches which belongs to FSCG. Both have stands with capacity of 1,000 seats and the main field have floodlights, too. Montenegro national football team use both stadiums as their training base before every single game.

Because it meets criteria for UEFA games, the main field is often home to Montenegro women's national football team, Montenegro national under-19 football team and Montenegro national under-17 football team games. Except that, teams from First and Second Montenegrin League can always use the main ground for their matches, which is especially crucial during the stormy days, when their own stadiums are in bad condition.

=== FK Budućnost seat and training grounds ===
Another operator in Camp FSCG is most successful Montenegrin team - FK Budućnost, who owns area of 18,000 sq meters. They have an administrative building with offices, meeting rooms, press room and technical facilities, and also two football grounds. Both pitches have stands with capacity of 1,000 seats. On the grounds, their home games plays all young teams of FK Budućnost and ŽFK Budućnost, too.
For the first time, senior team of FK Budućnost played an official game at training center in November 2016. On Montenegrin Cup match, they hosted FK Kom.

=== OFK Titograd stadium ===
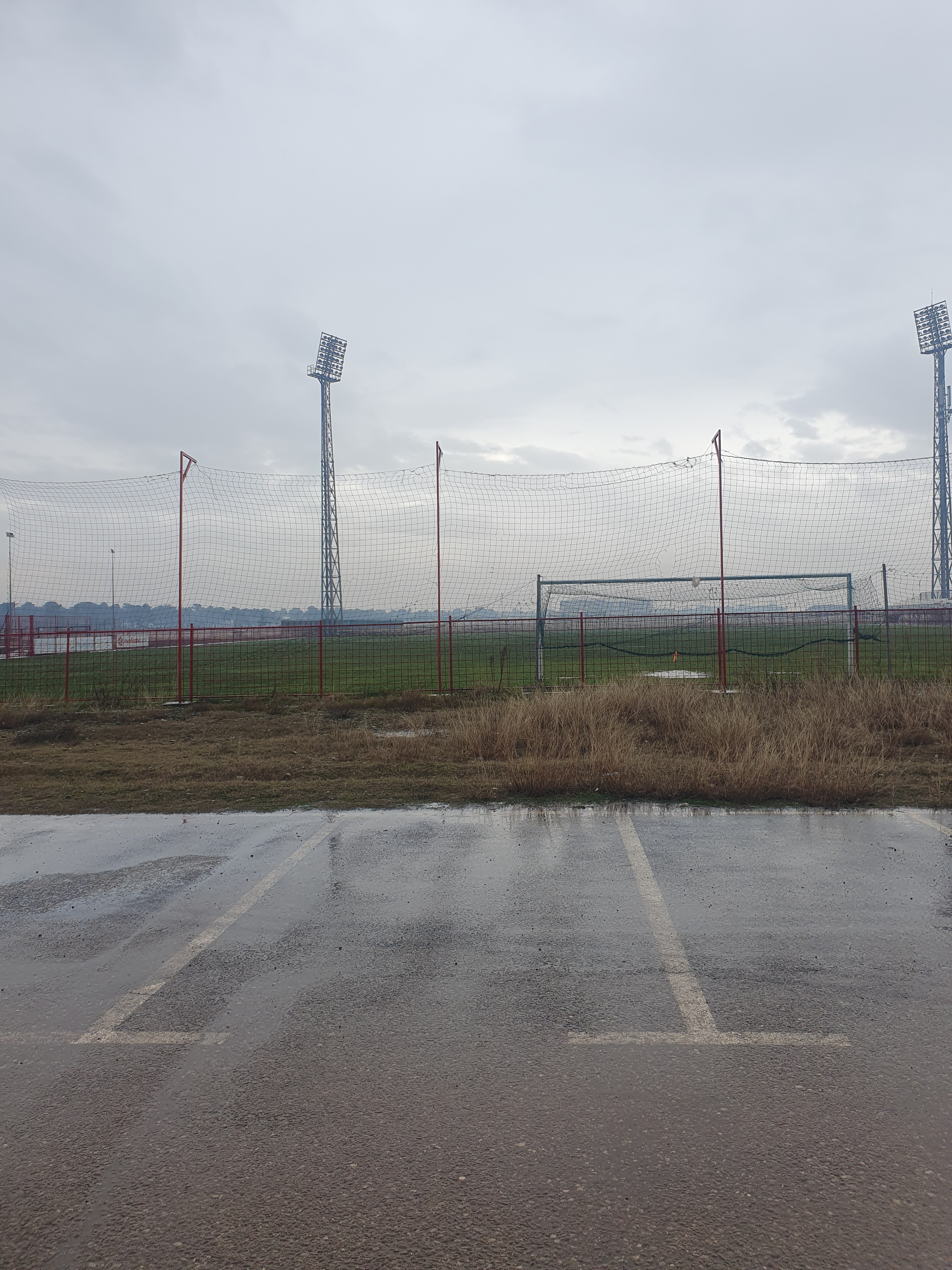
OFK Titograd stadium

Another team from Podgorica - OFK Titograd have their own facilities in Camp FSCG, at area of 9,000 sq meters. Previously, the home of OFK Titograd was Stadion Cvijetni Brijeg, but at 2008 on that location was built elementary school. So, OFK Titograd moved to Stari Aerodrom training center, where they own an administrative-technical building and a stadium whose capacity is 1,250 seats. Floodlights were installed the year 2019.

== See also ==
- Football Association of Montenegro
- Podgorica City Stadium
- Football in Montenegro
