= Malta women's national football team =

Women's national association football team representing Malta

Malta
- Association: Malta Football Association
- Confederation: UEFA (Europe)
- Head coach: Manuela Tesse
- Captain: Emma Lipman
- Most caps: Dorianne Theuma (118)
- Top scorer: Dorianne Theuma (26)
- Home stadium: Centenary Stadium
- FIFA code: MLT
First colours	Second colours

FIFA ranking
- Current: 90 ▲2 (20 October 2026)
- Highest: 74 (August 2003)
- Lowest: 115 (October 2007)

First international
- Romania 3–0 Malta (Bucharest, Romania; 10 August 2003)

Biggest win
- Malta 6–0 Luxembourg (Ta' Qali, Malta; 6 April 2013)

Biggest defeat
- Malta 0–13 Spain (Ta' Qali, Malta; 9 September 2009)

The Malta women's national football team (Maltese: Tim nazzjonali tal-futbol ta' Malta tan-nisa) represents the Malta Football Association in international women's football matches sanctioned by UEFA.

== History ==
The team first appeared in official competition in the qualifying round for the 2005 European Championship, debuting on August 10, 2003 in Bucharest with a 3–0 loss to Romania. Malta lost all eight games in the qualifiers, scoring once and conceding 35 goals. The team's first goal was scored by Sarah Caruana on November 16, 2003, against Croatia in a match played at the Gozo Stadium.

After 13 losses, Malta achieved its first draw on June 7, 2006 against Bosnia and Herzegovina in the last match of the 2007 World Cup's qualifying. The team played in the 2011 World Cup's qualifying, losing all games including a record 0–13 defeat to Spain. On March 3, 2011, Malta won an official match for the first time in the 2013 European Championship qualifying's preliminary round, beating Georgia 1–0 with a goal by D'Agostino in injury time.

On April 6, 2013 Malta beat Luxembourg 6–0 in the 2015 World Cup qualifying's preliminary round. The team also defeated Latvia and drew with Albania to top the group and make it past a preliminary round for the first time.

The team was coached from its foundation until 2014 by Pierre Brincat, and then from 2015 till 2022 by former U19 coach Mark Gatt. Former Italian international Manuela Tesse was appointed as the head coach from 1 January 2023

== Team image ==
=== Home stadium ===
The Malta women's national team play their home matches at the Centenary Stadium.

== Overall official record ==
Competition	Stage	Result	Opponent	Position	Scorers
2005 Euro qualifying	Regular stage (Class B)	0–3 0–8; 0–1 0–2; 0–3 1–4; 0–9 0–5	Romania; Bosnia and Herzegovina; Croatia (Republic of Ireland) Ireland	5 / 5	Caruana
2007 World Cup qualifying	Regular stage (Class B)	1–4 0–1; 1–4 1–3; 0–1 1–1	Croatia; Slovenia; Bosnia and Herzegovina	4 / 4	D'Agostino; Theuma, Tonna; Theuma
2009 Euro qualifying	Preliminary round	0–0; 2–4; 0–8	Lithuania; Luxembourg; Slovakia	4 / 4	Carabott 2
2011 World Cup qualifying	Regular stage	0–13 0–9; 0–8 0–6; 0–2 0–6; 0–2 1–5	Spain; England; Austria; Turkey	5 / 5	N. Pace
2013 Euro qualifying	Preliminary round	1–0; 0–2; 1–1	(Georgia (country)) Georgia; Faroe Islands; Armenia	2 / 4	D'Agostino Cuschieri
2015 World Cup qualifying	Preliminary round	1–1; 6–0; 2–0	Albania; Luxembourg; Latvia	1 / 4	Theuma; Theuma 2, Buttigieg, Carabott, Cuschieri, Xuereb; Cuschieri, Theuma
2015 World Cup qualifying	Regular stage	0–2 0–2; 0–5 0–8; 0–3 0–5; 0–11 0–5; 0–8 0–5	Israel; Denmark; Serbia; Switzerland; Iceland	6 / 6	

== Results and fixtures ==
The following is a list of match results in the last 12 months, as well as any future matches that have been scheduled.

Legend

Win Draw Loss Fixture

=== 2025 ===
1 December Friendly	Malta	0–3	Croatia	Ta' Qali, Malta
			Maja Joščak 42'; Ivana Rudelić 48'; Karla Kurkutović 76'	Stadium: Centenary Stadium

=== 2026 ===
3 March 2027 FIFA Women's World Cup qualification	Turkey	3–0	Malta	Istanbul, Turkey
15:00 (17:00 UTC+3)	L. Farrugia 7' (o.g.); Topçu 29'; Karabulut 88'	Report (FIFA); Report (UEFA)		Stadium: Pendik Stadium; Attendance: 275; Referee: Eugenia Gil Soriano (Spain)

7 March 2027 FIFA Women's World Cup qualification	Malta	1–4	Switzerland	Ta' Qali, Malta
19:00	M. Farrugia 19'	Report (FIFA); Report (UEFA)	Beney 8'; Lehmann 10'; Fölmli 39'; Schertenleib 73'	Stadium: Centenary Stadium; Attendance: 905; Referee: Jelena Medjedovic (Serbia)

14 April 2027 FIFA Women's World Cup qualification	Northern Ireland	4–0	Malta	Lurgan, Northern Ireland
20:00	Halliday 5', 52'; Andrews 17'; Maxwell 60'	Report (FIFA); Report (UEFA)		Stadium: Mourneview Park; Attendance: 821; Referee: Katarzyna Lisiecka-Sęk (Poland)

18 April 2027 FIFA Women's World Cup qualification	Malta	2–4	Northern Ireland	Ta' Qali, Malta
19:00	Farrugia 41'; Ayres 80'	Report (FIFA); Report (UEFA)	Mason 40', 51'; Johnson 69'; McFarland 72'	Stadium: Centenary Stadium; Attendance: 790; Referee: Lina Lehtovaara (Finland)

5 June 2027 FIFA Women's World Cup qualification	Switzerland	6–1	Malta	Lugano, Switzerland
19:30	Schertenleib 8'; Piubel 23'; Xhemaili 38', 81'; Csillag 40'; Reuteler 70'	Report (FIFA); Report (UEFA)	Willis 21'	Stadium: AIL Arena; Attendance: 7,526; Referee: Kristina Georgieva (Bulgaria)

9 June 2027 FIFA Women's World Cup qualification	Malta	0–3	Turkey	Ta' Qali, Malta
20:00			Gatt 8' (o.g.); Türkoğlu 38'; Altunkulak 52'	Stadium: Centenary Stadium; Referee: Bolic (CRO), Rodjak-Karšić (CRO), Petravić (CRO)

9 October Friendly	Malta	1–0	Luxembourg	Ta' Qali, Malta
19:00	Bugeja 57'	Report		Stadium: Centenary Stadium; Attendance: 600; Referee: Charlotte Carpenter (Wales

29 November Friendly	Malta	v	Kosovo	Ta'Qali, Malta
19:00		Report		Stadium: National Football Centre

5 December Friendly	Malta	v	Israel	Ta'Qali, Malta
19:00		Report		Stadium: National Football Centre

=== 2027 ===
6 March 2027 UEFA Women's Nations League C	Cyprus	v	Malta	Cyprus
		Report

20 April 2027 UEFA Women's Nations League C	Moldova	v	Malta	Moldova
		Report

24 April 2027 UEFA Women's Nations League C	Malta	v	Cyprus	Malta
		Report

15 June 2027 UEFA Women's Nations League C	Malta	v	Moldova	Malta
		Report

- Official Malta Fixtures (Friendly matches only) – MFA.com.mt
- Official Malta Results (Friendly matches only) – MFA.com.mt
- Malta Results and Fixtures – Soccerway.com

== Coaching staff ==
=== Current coaching staff ===
Position	Name	Ref.
Head coach	(Italy) Manuela Tesse	
Assistant coach	(Malta) Dionne Tonna	
Physical coach	(Malta) Karl Attard	

=== Coaching history ===
As of 23 December 2023

Manager	Malta career	Played	Won	Drawn	Lost	Win %
(Malta) Pierre Brincat	2003–2014	60	11	8	41	18.3
(Malta) Mark Gatt	2015–2022	66	23	13	30	34.8
(Italy) Manuela Tesse	2023–Present	10	8	1	1	80.0

== Players ==
=== Current squad ===
The following players were called up for the 2027 FIFA Women's World Cup qualification matches against Switzerland and Türkiye on 5 and 9 June 2026, respectively.

Caps and goals correct as of 18 April 2026, after the match against Northern Ireland.

No.	Pos.	Player	Date of birth (age)	Caps	Goals	Club
1	GK	Giulia D'Antuono	31 December 2003 (age 22)	8	0	(Malta Football Association) Mġarr United
12	GK	Raisa Costantino	23 May 2005 (age 21)	2	0	(Italian Football Federation) Pro Palazzolo
23	GK	Maya Cachia	23 December 2004 (age 21)	7	0	(Malta Football Association) Hibernians
2	DF	Alexandra Gatt	13 October 2004 (age 22)	8	0	(The Football Association) York City Ladies
3	DF	Tammy Falzon	5 August 2005 (age 21)	4	0	(Malta Football Association) Swieqi United
4	DF	Emma Lipman (captain)	23 February 1989 (age 37)	49	1	(Italian Football Federation) Genoa
6	DF	Oceane Grange	24 September 1995 (age 31)	11	0	(Italian Football Federation) Freedom FC
11	DF	Jade Flask	4 August 1996 (age 30)	72	7	(Malta Football Association) Swieqi United
13	DF	Amy Catania	29 December 2010 (age 15)	1	0	(Malta Football Association) Hibernians
18	DF	Emma Xuereb	5 January 1992 (age 34)	89	4	(Malta Football Association) Swieqi United
5	MF	Jana Barbara	7 July 2001 (age 25)	5	0	(German Football Association) VfR Warbeyen
7	MF	Emma Flannery	20 March 2008 (age 18)	4	0	(United States Soccer Federation) Albion SC Las Vegas
8	MF	Rachel Cuschieri (vice-captain)	26 April 1992 (age 34)	115	16	(Italian Football Federation) Genoa
14	MF	Shona Zammit	15 June 1996 (age 30)	98	7	(Malta Football Association) Swieqi United
15	MF	Veronique Mifsud	11 February 2003 (age 23)	12	0	(Malta Football Association) Mġarr United
16	MF	Leanne Cefai	22 February 2000 (age 26)	1	0	(Malta Football Association) Mġarr United
17	MF	Brenda Borg	1 May 1997 (age 29)	85	5	(Malta Football Association) Mġarr United
21	MF	Ema Micallef	9 March 2007 (age 19)	0	0	(Malta Football Association) Swieqi United
22	MF	Francesca Bartolo	10 February 2007 (age 19)	0	0	(Malta Football Association) Hibernians
9	FW	Kailey Willis	18 May 2003 (age 23)	31	4	(Italian Football Federation) Venezia
10	FW	Maria Farrugia	9 January 2001 (age 25)	65	14	(The Football Association) Bristol City
19	FW	Nyorah Celeste	6 August 2007 (age 19)	1	0	(Malta Football Association) Hibernians
20	FW	Nicole Sciberras	28 April 2001 (age 25)	61	0	(Malta Football Association) Hibernians

=== Recent call-ups ===
The following players were called up to the squad within the last 12 months.

Pos.	Player	Date of birth (age)	Caps	Goals	Club	Latest call-up
GK	Patricia Ebejer ^{PRE}	23 February 2000 (age 26)	13	0	(Malta) Mġarr United	v. Northern Ireland, 14 April 2026
DF	Maya Lucia ^{INJ}	6 July 2003 (age 23)	20	0	(Cyprus) Apollon Ladies	v. Switzerland, 5 June 2026
DF	Maia Debono	7 November 2001 (age 25)	3	0	(Malta) Mġarr United	v. Northern Ireland, 18 April 2026
DF	Stephania Farrugia ^{INJ}	11 September 1991 (age 35)	109	5	(Malta) Birkirkara	v. Northern Ireland, 14 April 2026
DF	Fiona Buttigieg	18 July 1998 (age 28)	4	0	(England) Luton Town	v. Switzerland, 7 March 2026
DF	Georgiana Mifsud ^{PRE}	14 February 2004 (age 22)	2	0	(Malta) Hibernians	v. Turkey, 3 March 2026
DF	Rebecca Bajada	22 December 1994 (age 31)	22	0	(Malta) Mġarr United	v. Croatia, 1 December 2025
DF	Jade Schembri	8 May 1999 (age 27)	1	0	(Malta) Swieqi United	v. Croatia, 1 December 2025
DF	Jessica Dimech ^{PRE}	22 June 2002 (age 24)	8	0	(Malta) Hibernians	v. Croatia, 28 November 2025
DF	Valentina Rapa	14 February 2002 (age 24)	7	0	(Malta) Swieqi United	v. Belarus, 28 October 2025
DF	Mariah Cardona ^{PRE}	14 December 2003 (age 22)	1	0	(Malta) Birkirkara	v. Belarus, 25 October 2025
MF	Crista Ganado	5 August 2005 (age 21)	1	0	(England) Leicester City	v. Northern Ireland, 18 April 2026
MF	Michaela Cachia	25 August 2005 (age 21)	0	0	(Malta) Swieqi United	v. Croatia, 1 December 2025
MF	Sarah Urpani	21 June 2000 (age 26)	0	0	(Malta) Swieqi United	v. Croatia, 1 December 2025
MF	Amber Grech ^{PRE}	10 November 1995 (age 31)	11	0	(Malta) Hibernians	v. Croatia, 28 November 2025
MF	Gabriella Zahra ^{RET}	2 May 1991 (age 35)	61	1	(Malta) Birkirkara	v. Belarus, 25 October 2025
FW	Haley Bugeja ^{INJ}	5 May 2004 (age 22)	47	24	(Italy) Inter Milan	v. Switzerland, 5 June 2026
FW	Leah Ayres	22 November 2003 (age 22)	13	1	(Malta) Hibernians	v. Northern Ireland, 18 April 2026
FW	Yulya Carella	30 March 2005 (age 21)	11	0	(Malta) Mġarr United	v. Northern Ireland, 18 April 2026
FW	Lexine Farrugia	6 July 2007 (age 19)	8	0	(Italy) Roma	v. Northern Ireland, 18 April 2026
FW	Sara Saliba ^{INJ}	26 March 2007 (age 19)	4	1	(Malta) Swieqi United	v. Northern Ireland, 14 April 2026
Notes: ^{INJ} = Withdrew due to injury; ^{PRE} = Preliminary squad / on stand-by; ^{RET} = Retired from national team

=== Captains ===
- Dorianne Theuma (????–????)
- Emma Lipman (????–)

== Records ==
As of 9 June 2026

Players in bold are still active with the national team.

=== Most appearances ===
Rank	Player	Career	Caps	Goals
1	Dorianne Theuma	2003–2024	118	26
2	**Rachel Cuschieri**	2007–present	115	16
3	**Stephania Farrugia**	2007–present	109	5
4	**Charlene Zammit**	2009–present	105	2
5	**Shona Zammit**	2014–present	98	7
6	**Ylenia Carabott**	2005–present	97	20
7	**Emma Xuereb**	2009–present	89	4
8	**Brenda Borg**	2013–present	85	5
9	**Janice Xuereb**	2013–present	73	0
10	**Jade Flask**	2014–present	72	7

=== Top goalscorers ===
Rank	Player	Career	Goals	Caps	Avg.
1	Dorianne Theuma	2003-2024	26	118	0.22
2	**Haley Bugeja**	2020–present	24	47	0.51
3	**Ylenia Carabott**	2007–present	20	97	0.21
4	**Rachel Cuschieri**	2009–present	16	115	0.14
5	**Maria Farrugia**	2019–present	14	65	0.22
6	**Jade Flask**	2014–present	7	72	0.10
6	**Shona Zammit**	2014–present	7	98	0.07
8	Martina Borg	2014–2023	6	42	0.14
9	**Brenda Borg**	2013–present	5	85	0.06
9	**Stephania Farrugia**	2013–present	5	109	0.05

== Competitive record ==
=== FIFA Women's World Cup ===
FIFA Women's World Cup record									Qualification record									
Year	Result	Pld	W	D*	L	GF	GA	GD	Pld	W	D*	L	GF	GA	GD			
(China) 1991	Did not enter								UEFA Euro 1991									
(Sweden) 1995	Did not enter								UEFA Euro 1995									
(United States) 1999	Did not enter								Did not enter									
(United States) 2003	Did not enter								Did not enter									
(China) 2007	Did not qualify								6	0	1	5	4	14	−10			
(Germany) 2011	Did not qualify								8	0	0	8	1	51	−50			
(Canada) 2015	Did not qualify								13	2	1	10	9	56	−47			
(France) 2019	Did not qualify								3	1	1	1	3	2	+1			
(Australia) (New Zealand) 2023	8	2	1	5	6	17	−11											
(Brazil) 2027	Qualified								``To be determined'							(Costa Rica) (Jamaica) (Mexico) (United States) 2031	To be determined	To be determined
(United Kingdom) 2035	To be determined								To be determined									
Total	-	-	-	-	-	-	-	-	38	5	1	29	23	140	−117			

*Draws include knockout matches decided on penalty kicks.

=== UEFA Women's Championship ===
UEFA Women's Championship record								Qualifying record							
Year	Result	Pld	W	D	L	GF	GA	Pld	W	D	L	GF	GA	P/R	Rnk
(England) (Italy) (Norway) (Sweden) 1984	Did not enter							Did not enter							
(Norway) 1987	Did not enter							Did not enter							
(West Germany) 1989	Did not enter							Did not enter							
(Denmark) 1991	Did not enter							Did not enter							
(Italy) 1993	Did not enter							Did not enter							
(England) (Germany) (Norway) (Sweden) 1995	Did not enter							Did not enter							
(Norway) (Sweden) 1997	Did not enter							Did not enter							
(Germany) 2001	Did not enter							Did not enter							
(England) 2005	Did not qualify							8	0	0	8	1	35	–	
(Finland) 2009	Did not qualify							3	0	1	2	2	12	–	
(Sweden) 2013	Did not qualify							3	1	1	1	2	3	–	
(Netherlands) 2017	Did not qualify							3	2	0	1	9	8	–	
(England) 2022	Did not qualify							10	3	1	6	11	30	–	
(Switzerland) 2025	Did not qualify							6	0	1	5	2	10	▼ (Note: From Euro 2025 onwards a new qualifying format was introduced, linked to the Women's Nations League where teams are divided into leagues with promotion/relegation between the leagues at the end of each cycle.)	30th
2029	To be determined							To be determined							
Total	-	-	-	-	-	-	-	27	6	3	18	25	88	30th	

*Draws include knockout matches decided on penalty kicks.

=== UEFA Nations League ===
UEFA Nations League record
Year	League	Group	Position	Pld	W	D	L	GF	GA	P/R	Rnk
2023–24	C	1	1st	6	5	1	0	13	1	▲	34th
2025	C	2	To be determined								
Total				6	5	1	0	13	1	34th	

▲	Promoted at end of season
Same position	No movement at end of season
▼	Relegated at end of season
*	Participated in promotion/relegation play-offs

== See also ==
Malta International Football Tournament

- Sport in Malta
  - Football in Malta
    - Women's football in Malta
    - Malta women's national football team
    - Malta women's national under-20 football team
    - Malta women's national under-17 football team
    - Malta men's national football team
    - Malta men's national under-21 football team
    - Malta men's national under-19 football team
    - Malta men's national under-17 football team
