= Birkirkara F.C. (women) =

Birkirkara
- Full name: Birkirkara Football Club
- Nickname(s): Stripes
- Founded: 1995; 30 years ago
- Ground: Infetti Ground, Birkirkara, Malta
- Capacity: 1,055
- Chairman: (Malta) Colin Bason
- Head Coach: (Malta) Jose Borg
- League: Maltese First Division
- 2024–25: Maltese First Division, 3rd
- Website: https://www.birkirkarafc.com/Squad.php?team_code=W
Home colours	Away colours	Third colours

Birkirkara F.C. is the women's team of the Maltese football club Birkirkara F.C., based in Birkirkara, Malta.

As of 2023–24, they are 12-time champions of the Maltese First Division.

== Titles ==
Maltese First Division

- Champions (12):

2006–2007, 2008–2009, 2009–2010, 2011–2012, 2012–2013, 2016–2017, 2017–2018, 2018–19, 2019–20, 2021–22, 2022–23, 2023–24

- Cup winners (16)

1998–1999, 1999–2000, 2001–2002, 2002–2003, 2004–2005, 2006–2007, 2007–2008, 2008–2009, 2009–2010, 2010–2011, 2012–2013, 2013–2014, 2016–2017, 2017–18, 2018–19, 2019–20
