= September 17 =

September 17 this year in various calendars
- Thursday, 17 September 2026
Akan	Kuruyaw
Armenian	29 Hoṙi 1476
Aztec	Tititl 10, 4 Tecpatl
Babylonian	4 Ululu, 2337 SE
Balinese pawukon	Luang, Pepet, Pasah, Menala, Paing, Paniron, Wraspati of Parangbakat, Yama, Dangu, Raja
Bengali	2 Ashshin, BS 1433
Chinese	Yang Wood Horse・Horn Mansion; Fire Horse Year, Month 8, Day 7 (Bailu, 6 days until Qiufen)
Common Era	17 September 2026 CE
Coptic	7 Thout, AM 1743
Egyptian	4 Mechir, 2775 NE
Ethiopian	7 Maskaram, 2019 Amätä Məhrät
French Republican	La Fête de la Vertu de l'Année 234 de la République
Gregorian	17 September, AD 2026
Hebrew	6 Tishrei, AM 5787
Hindu	Anurādhā・Viṣkambha; Solar: 1 Āśvina, 1948 SE; Lunisolar: Ṣaṣṭhī, Śukla pakṣa of Bhādrapada, 2083 VE; Rāudra・5127 KY・1,872,835
Icelandic	Fimmtudagur, 24 Tvímánuður 2026
Islamic	4 Rabi' al-thani, AH 1448 (using tabular method)
ISO week date	2026-W38-4
Japanese	7 Hazuki, Reiwa 8 (Hakuro, 6 days until Shūbun)
Julian	4 September, AD 2026 (AM 7534)
Julian day	2461301
Korean	7 Dakdal, 4359 DE
Maya	13.0.13.16.18; 11 Chen, 4 Etznab
Roman	Pridie Nonas Septembres, MMDCCLXXIX AUC
Solar Hijri	26 Shahrivar, SH 1405
Tibetan	6 khrums, me pho rta 2153 or 1772 or 1000

<<	September					>>
Su	Mo	Tu	We	Th	Fr	Sa
		1	2	3	4	5
6	7	8	9	10	11	12
13	14	15	16	17	18	19
20	21	22	23	24	25	26
27	28	29	30
2026

September 17 in recent years
2026 (Thursday)
2025 (Wednesday)
2024 (Tuesday)
2023 (Sunday)
2022 (Saturday)
2021 (Friday)
2020 (Thursday)
2019 (Tuesday)
2018 (Monday)
2017 (Sunday)

September 17 is the 260th day of the year (261st in leap years) in the Gregorian calendar; 105 days remain until the end of the year.

== Events ==
=== Pre-1600 ===
- 14 – The Roman Senate decides to deify the late emperor Augustus.
- 1111 – Highest Galician nobility led by Pedro Fróilaz de Traba and the bishop Diego Gelmírez crown Alfonso VII as "King of Galicia".
- 1176 – The Battle of Myriokephalon is the last attempt by the Byzantine Empire to recover central Anatolia from the Seljuk Turks.
- 1382 – Louis the Great's daughter, Mary, is crowned "king" of Hungary.
- 1390 – Manuel drives his nephew John VII, who had declared himself emperor in April of that year, out from Constantinople and ends John's reign.
- 1462 – Thirteen Years' War: A Polish army under Piotr Dunin decisively defeats the Teutonic Order at the Battle of Świecino.
- 1543 – The first Finnish-language book, the Abckiria by Mikael Agricola, is published in Stockholm.
- 1577 – The Treaty of Bergerac is signed between King Henry III of France and the Huguenots.

=== 1601–1900 ===
- 1620 – Polish–Ottoman War: The Ottoman Empire defeats the Polish–Lithuanian Commonwealth during the Battle of Cecora.
- 1630 – The city of Boston, Massachusetts, is founded in North America.
- 1631 – Sweden wins a major victory at the Battle of Breitenfeld against the Holy Roman Empire during the Thirty Years' War.
- 1658 – The Battle of Vilanova is fought between Portugal and Spain during the Portuguese Restoration War.
- 1683 – Antonie van Leeuwenhoek writes a letter to the Royal Society describing "animalcules", later known as protozoa.
- 1775 – American Revolutionary War: The invasion of Quebec by the Continental Army begins with the Siege of Fort St. Jean.
- 1776 – The Presidio of San Francisco is founded in New Spain.
- 1778 – The Treaty of Fort Pitt is signed. It is the first formal treaty between the United States and a Native American tribe.
- 1787 – The United States Constitution is signed at Independence Hall in Philadelphia, bringing the Constitutional Convention to an end.
- 1793 – War of the Pyrenees: France defeats a Spanish force at the Battle of Peyrestortes.
- 1794 – Flanders Campaign: France completes its conquest of the Austrian Netherlands at the Battle of Sprimont.
- 1809 – Peace between Sweden and Russia in the Finnish War; the territory that will become Finland is ceded to Russia by the Treaty of Fredrikshamn.
- 1849 – American abolitionist Harriet Tubman makes her first attempt to escape from slavery.
- 1859 – Joshua A. Norton declares himself "Norton I, Emperor of the United States".
- 1861 – Argentine Civil Wars: The State of Buenos Aires defeats the Argentine Confederation at the Battle of Pavón.
- 1862 – American Civil War: George B. McClellan's Army of the Potomac halts the first invasion of the North by Robert E. Lee and his Army of Northern Virginia in the single-day Battle of Antietam, the bloodiest day in American military history.
- 1862 – American Civil War: The Allegheny Arsenal explosion in Lawrenceville, Pennsylvania results in the single largest civilian disaster during the war.
- 1894 – Battle of the Yalu River, the largest naval engagement of the First Sino-Japanese War.
- 1900 – Philippine–American War: Filipinos under Juan Cailles defeat Americans under Colonel Benjamin F. Cheatham Jr. at Mabitac.

=== 1901–present ===
- 1901 – Second Boer War: A Boer column defeats a British force at the Battle of Blood River Poort.
- 1901 – Second Boer War: Boers capture a squadron of the 17th Lancers at the Battle of Elands River.
- 1908 – The Wright Flyer flown by Orville Wright, with Lieutenant Thomas Selfridge as passenger, crashes, killing Selfridge, who becomes the first airplane fatality.
- 1914 – Andrew Fisher becomes Prime Minister of Australia for the third time.
- 1914 – World War I: The Race to the Sea begins.
- 1916 – World War I: Manfred von Richthofen ("The Red Baron"), a flying ace of the German Luftstreitkräfte, wins his first aerial combat near Cambrai, France.
- 1920 – The National Football League is organized as the American Professional Football Association in Canton, Ohio.
- 1924 – The Border Protection Corps is established in the Second Polish Republic for the defence of the eastern border against armed Soviet raids and local bandits.
- 1928 – The Okeechobee hurricane strikes southeastern Florida, killing more than 2,500 people.
- 1930 – The Kurdish Ararat rebellion is suppressed by the Turks.
- 1932 – A speech by Laureano Gómez leads to the escalation of the Leticia Incident.
- 1935 – The Niagara Gorge Railroad ceases operations after a rockslide.
- 1939 – World War II: The Soviet invasion of Poland begins.
- 1939 – World War II: German submarine U-29 sinks the British aircraft carrier HMS Courageous.
- 1940 – World War II: Due to setbacks in the Battle of Britain and approaching autumn weather, Hitler postpones Operation Sea Lion.
- 1941 – World War II: A decree of the Soviet State Committee of Defense restores compulsory military training.
- 1941 – World War II: Soviet forces enter Tehran during the Anglo-Soviet invasion of Iran.
- 1944 – World War II: Allied airborne troops parachute into the Netherlands as the "Market" half of Operation Market Garden and British XXX Corps advances into the Netherlands as the "Garden" half of the Operation.
- 1944 – World War II: Soviet troops launch the Tallinn Offensive against Germany and pro-independence Estonian units.
- 1944 – World War II: German forces are attacked by the Allies in the Battle of San Marino.
- 1948 – The Lehi (also known as the Stern gang) assassinates Count Folke Bernadotte, who was appointed by the United Nations to mediate between the Arab nations and Israel.
- 1948 – The Nizam of Hyderabad surrenders his sovereignty over the Hyderabad State and joins the Indian Union.
- 1949 – The Canadian steamship SS Noronic burns in Toronto Harbour with the loss of over 118 lives.
- 1950 – The People's Liberation Army Air Force Airborne Corps (Then known as the PLAAF 1st Ground Forces Brigade) is founded.
- 1950 – The Republic of India formally recognised the State of Israel.
- 1961 – The world's first retractable roof stadium, the Civic Arena, opens in Pittsburgh, Pennsylvania.
- 1961 – Northwest Orient Airlines Flight 706 crashes during takeoff from O'Hare International Airport in Chicago, Illinois, killing all 37 people on board.
- 1965 – The Battle of Chawinda is fought between Pakistan and India.
- 1974 – Bangladesh, Grenada and Guinea-Bissau join the United Nations.
- 1976 – The Space Shuttle Enterprise is unveiled by NASA.
- 1978 – The Camp David Accords are signed by Israel and Egypt.
- 1980 – After weeks of strikes at the Lenin Shipyard in Gdańsk, Poland, the nationwide independent trade union Solidarity is established.
- 1980 – Former Nicaraguan President Anastasio Somoza Debayle is killed in Asunción, Paraguay.
- 1983 – Vanessa Williams becomes the first black Miss America.
- 1991 – Estonia, North Korea, South Korea, Latvia, Lithuania, the Marshall Islands and Micronesia join the United Nations.
- 1991 – The first version of the Linux kernel (0.01) is released to the Internet.
- 1992 – An Iranian Kurdish leader and his two joiners are assassinated by political militants in Berlin.
- 2001 – The New York Stock Exchange reopens for trading after the September 11 attacks, the longest closure since the Great Depression.
- 2001 – George W. Bush, president of the United States, delivers remarks at the Islamic Center of Washington praising Muslim Americans and condemning Islamophobia in the aftermath of the September 11 attacks.
- 2006 – Fourpeaked Mountain in Alaska erupts, marking the first eruption for the volcano in at least 10,000 years.
- 2006 – An audio tape of a private speech by Hungarian Prime Minister Ferenc Gyurcsány is leaked to the public, in which he confessed that his Hungarian Socialist Party had lied to win the 2006 election, sparking widespread protests across the country.
- 2011 – Occupy Wall Street movement begins in Zuccotti Park, New York City.
- 2013 – Grand Theft Auto V earns more than half a billion dollars on its first day of release.
- 2016 – Two bombs explode in Seaside Park, New Jersey, and Manhattan. Thirty-one people are injured in the Manhattan bombing.
- 2018 – A Russian reconnaissance aircraft carrying 15 people on board is brought down by a Syrian surface-to-air missile over the Mediterranean Sea.
- 2025 – Saudi Arabia and Pakistan sign the Strategic Mutual Defence Agreement.

== Births ==
=== Pre-1600 ===
- 879 – Charles the Simple, Frankish king (died 929)
- 1433 – James of Portugal, Portuguese prince and cardinal (died 1459)
- 1479 – Celio Calcagnini, Italian astronomer (died 1541)
- 1550 – Paul V, pope of the Catholic Church (died 1621)
- 1565 – Edward Fortunatus, German nobleman (died 1600)
- 1578 – John Prideaux, English administrator and bishop (died 1650)

=== 1601–1900 ===
- 1605 – Francesco Sacrati, Italian composer (died 1650)
- 1630 – Ranuccio II Farnese, Duke of Parma (died 1694)
- 1639 – Hans Herr, Swiss bishop (died 1725)
- 1688 – Maria Luisa of Savoy, queen consort of Spain (died 1714)
- 1730 – Friedrich Wilhelm von Steuben, Prussian-American general (died 1794)
- 1739 – John Rutledge, American judge and politician, 2nd Chief Justice of the United States (died 1800)
- 1743 – Marquis de Condorcet, French mathematician and political scientist (died 1794)
- 1771 – Johann August Apel, German jurist and author (died 1816)
- 1773 – Jonathan Alder, American captain and farmer (died 1849)
- 1783 – Nadezhda Durova, Russian soldier (died 1866)
- 1787 – Teresa Casati, Italian noblewomen and revolutionary (died 1830)
- 1797 – Heinrich Kuhl, German naturalist and zoologist (died 1821)
- 1817 – Herman Adolfovich Trautscohold, German geologist and paleontologist (died 1902)
- 1819 – Marthinus Wessel Pretorius, South African general and politician, 1st President of the South African Republic (died 1901)
- 1820 – Émile Augier, French playwright (died 1889)
- 1820 – Earl Van Dorn, Confederate general (died 1863)
- 1821 – Arthur Saint-Léon, French choreographer (died 1870)
- 1825 – Lucius Quintus Cincinnatus Lamar II, American jurist and politician, 16th United States Secretary of the Interior (died 1893)
- 1826 – Bernhard Riemann, German-Italian mathematician and academic (died 1866)
- 1850 – Guerra Junqueiro, Portuguese journalist, lawyer, and politician (died 1923)
- 1853 – Frederick Corbett, British officer and Victoria Cross recipient (died 1912)
- 1854 – David Dunbar Buick, Scottish-American businessman, founded Buick Motor Company (died 1929)
- 1857 – Konstantin Tsiolkovsky, Russian scientist and engineer (died 1935)
- 1859 – Frank Dawson Adams, Canadian geologist and academic (died 1942)
- 1859 – Billy the Kid, American gunman (died 1881)
- 1859 – I. L. Patterson, American politician, 18th Governor of Oregon (died 1929)
- 1860 – Mihkel Martna, Estonian journalist and politician (died 1934)
- 1864 – Mykhailo Kotsiubynsky, Ukrainian writer (died 1913)
- 1864 – James Tancred, English admiral (died 1943)
- 1865 – William Murray McPherson, Australian politician, 31st Premier of Victoria (died 1932)
- 1867 – Vera Yevstafievna Popova, Russian chemist (died 1896)
- 1868 – James Alexander Calder, Canadian educator and politician, Canadian Minister of Militia and Defence (died 1956)
- 1869 – Christian Lous Lange, Norwegian political scientist, historian, and academic, Nobel Prize laureate (died 1938)
- 1871 – Eivind Astrup, Norwegian explorer (died 1895)
- 1874 – Walter Murdoch, Australian author and academic (died 1970)
- 1878 – Vincenzo Tommasini, Italian composer (died 1950)
- 1879 – Rube Foster, American baseball player and manager (died 1930)
- 1879 – Periyar, Indian social activist and politician (died 1973)
- 1881 – Alfred Carpenter, English admiral, Victoria Cross recipient (died 1955)
- 1883 – William Carlos Williams, American poet, short story writer, and essayist (died 1963)
- 1884 – Charles Griffes, American pianist and composer (died 1920)
- 1886 – Anton Irv, Estonian captain (died 1919)
- 1897 – Earl Webb, American baseball player and coach (died 1965)
- 1900 – Hughie Critz, American baseball player (died 1980)
- 1900 – Lena Frances Edwards, African-American physician, awarded the Presidential Medal of Freedom (died 1986)
- 1900 – J. Willard Marriott, American businessman, founded the Marriott Corporation (died 1985)
- 1900 – Martha Ostenso, Canadian screenwriter and novelist (died 1963)
- 1900 – Hedwig Ross, New Zealand-born educator and political activist, founding member of the Communist Party of New Zealand (died 1971)

=== 1901–present ===
- 1901 – Francis Chichester, English pilot and sailor (died 1972)
- 1902 – Bea Miles, Australian author and eccentric (died 1973)
- 1903 – Karel Miljon, Dutch boxer (died 1984)
- 1903 – Frank O'Connor, Irish short story writer, novelist, and poet (died 1966)
- 1903 – Minanogawa Tōzō, Japanese sumo wrestler, the 34th Yokozuna (died 1971)
- 1905 – Tshekedi Khama, regent of the Bamangwato tribe (died 1959)
- 1906 – J. R. Jayewardene, Sri Lankan lawyer and politician, 2nd President of Sri Lanka (died 1996)
- 1906 – Edgar Wayburn, American physician and environmentalist (died 2010)
- 1907 – Warren E. Burger, American lawyer and judge, 15th Chief Justice of the United States (died 1995)
- 1908 – John Creasey, English author and politician (died 1973)
- 1908 – Rafael Israelyan, Armenian architect and educator, designed the Sardarapat Memorial and St. Vartan Cathedral (died 1973)
- 1909 – Elizabeth Enright, American author and illustrator (died 1968)
- 1912 – Irena Kwiatkowska, Polish actress (died 2011)
- 1912 – Maksim Tank, Belarusian poet, journalist, and translator (died 1995)
- 1914 – Thomas J. Bata, Czech-Canadian businessman (died 2008)
- 1914 – William Grut, Swedish pentathlete (died 2012)
- 1914 – Shin Kanemaru, Japanese politician, Deputy Prime Minister of Japan (died 1996)
- 1915 – M. F. Husain, Indian painter and director (died 2011)
- 1916 – Mary Stewart, British author and poet (died 2014)
- 1917 – Ib Melchior, Danish-American author and screenwriter (died 2015)
- 1917 – Isang Yun, South Korean-German composer and educator (died 1995)
- 1918 – Lea Gottlieb, Hungarian-Israeli fashion designer, founded the Gottex Company (died 2012)
- 1918 – Chaim Herzog, Irish-born Israeli general and politician, 6th President of Israel (died 1997)
- 1920 – Dinah Sheridan, English actress (died 2012)
- 1920 – Hans Otto Jung, German viticulturist, jazz musician and patron of music (died 2009)
- 1922 – Agostinho Neto, Angolan poet and politician, 1st President of Angola (died 1979)
- 1923 – Ralph Sharon, English-American pianist, composer, and conductor (died 2015)
- 1923 – Hank Williams, American singer-songwriter and guitarist (died 1953)
- 1925 – Dorothy Loudon, American actress and singer (died 2003)
- 1925 – John List, American murderer (died 2008)
- 1926 – Bill Black, American bass player and bandleader (died 1965)
- 1926 – Curtis Harrington, American actor, director, and screenwriter (died 2007)
- 1926 – Hovie Lister, American minister and pianist (died 2001)
- 1926 – Jean-Marie Lustiger, French cardinal (died 2007)
- 1926 – Jack McDuff, American singer and organist (died 2001)
- 1927 – George Blanda, American football player (died 2010)
- 1927 – Kevin Schubert, Australian rugby league player (died 2007)
- 1928 – Park Honan, American author and academic (died 2014)
- 1928 – Roddy McDowall, English-American actor (died 1998)
- 1929 – Sil Austin, American saxophonist (died 2001)
- 1929 – David Craig, Baron Craig of Radley, Northern Irish air marshal and politician
- 1929 – Stirling Moss, English racing driver and sportscaster (died 2020)
- 1930 – David Huddleston, American actor (died 2016)
- 1930 – Lalgudi Jayaraman, Indian violinist and composer (died 2013)
- 1930 – Theo Loevendie, Dutch clarinet player and composer
- 1930 – Edgar Mitchell, American captain, pilot, and astronaut (died 2016)
- 1930 – Jim Rohn, American philosopher and author (died 2009)
- 1930 – Thomas P. Stafford, American general, pilot, and astronaut (died 2024)
- 1931 – Anne Bancroft, American actress (died 2005)
- 1931 – Jean-Claude Carrière, French actor and screenwriter (died 2021)
- 1932 – Robert B. Parker, American author and academic (died 2010)
- 1932 – Indarjit Singh, Indian-English journalist
- 1932 – Samuel Ogbemudia, Nigerian army officer and politician (died 2017)
- 1933 – Bulldog Brower, American wrestler (died 1997)
- 1933 – Chuck Grassley, American lawyer and politician
- 1933 – Claude Provost, Canadian-American ice hockey player (died 1984)
- 1934 – Maureen Connolly, American tennis player (died 1969)
- 1935 – Ken Kesey, American novelist, essayist, and poet (died 2001)
- 1936 – Gerald Guralnik, American physicist and academic (died 2014)
- 1936 – Michael Hennagin, American composer and educator (died 1993)
- 1937 – Nigel Boocock, English-Australian motorcycle racer (died 2015)
- 1937 – Orlando Cepeda, Puerto Rican baseball player (died 2024)
- 1937 – Sitakant Mahapatra, Indian poet and literary critic
- 1938 – Paul Benedict, American actor (died 2008)
- 1938 – Perry Robinson, American clarinet player and composer (died 2018)
- 1938 – Bobby Wine, American baseball player and coach
- 1939 – Carl Dennis, American poet and educator
- 1939 – Shelby Flint, American singer-songwriter and voice actress
- 1939 – David Souter, American lawyer and jurist (died 2025)
- 1940 – Jan Eliasson, Swedish politician and diplomat, 4th Deputy Secretary-General of the United Nations
- 1940 – Peter Lever, English cricketer (died 2025)
- 1940 – Gilberto Parlotti, Italian motorcycle racer (died 1972)
- 1941 – Bob Matsui, American lawyer and politician (died 2005)
- 1942 – Robert Graysmith, American author and illustrator
- 1942 – Des Lynam, Irish-English journalist and author
- 1942 – Lupe Ontiveros, American actress (died 2012)
- 1944 – Les Emmerson, Canadian singer-songwriter and guitarist (died 2021)
- 1944 – Reinhold Messner, Italian mountaineer and explorer
- 1944 – Jean Taylor, American mathematician and academic
- 1945 – David Emerson, Canadian economist and politician, 8th Minister of Foreign Affairs for Canada
- 1945 – Phil Jackson, American basketball player and coach
- 1945 – Bhakti Charu Swami, Indian religious leader (died 2020)
- 1946 – Billy Bonds, English footballer and manager (died 2025)
- 1946 – Heimar Lenk, Estonian journalist and politician
- 1947 – Tessa Jowell, English social worker and politician, Minister for the Cabinet Office (died 2018)
- 1947 – Enrique Krauze, Mexican historian, critic, and publisher
- 1947 – Gail Carson Levine, American author
- 1947 – Jeff MacNelly, American cartoonist (died 2000)
- 1948 – Kemal Monteno, Bosnian singer-songwriter (died 2015)
- 1948 – John Ritter, American actor and producer (died 2003)
- 1949 – Ron Stevens, Canadian lawyer and politician (died 2014)
- 1950 – Narendra Modi, Indian politician; Chief Minister of Gujarat and 14th Prime Minister of India
- 1950 – Fee Waybill, American singer-songwriter and producer
- 1951 – Russell Brown, Scottish politician
- 1951 – Cassandra Peterson, American actress, television host, and producer
- 1951 – Kermit Washington, American basketball player
- 1952 – Harold Solomon, American tennis player and coach
- 1953 – Luís Amado, Portuguese politician, former Minister of Foreign Affairs
- 1953 – Junior Bridgeman, American basketball player and businessman (died 2025)
- 1953 – Tamasin Day-Lewis, English chef and author
- 1953 – Altaf Hussain, Pakistani-English soldier and politician
- 1953 – Rita Rudner, American actress, comedian, and screenwriter
- 1954 – Joël-François Durand, French pianist and composer
- 1954 – Bill Irwin, American wrestler
- 1955 – Scott Simpson, American golfer
- 1955 – Charles Martinet, American actor
- 1955 – Mike Parson, American politician, 57th Governor of Missouri
- 1956 – Almazbek Atambayev, Kyrgyz politician, 4th President of Kyrgyzstan
- 1956 – Thad Bosley, American baseball player and coach
- 1956 – Mandawuy Yunupingu, Australian singer-songwriter and guitarist (died 2013)
- 1957 – David Bintley, English ballet dancer and director
- 1957 – Steve Bryles, American businessman and politician (died 2012)
- 1957 – Nurten Yılmaz, Austrian politician
- 1958 – Janez Janša, Slovenian politician, 5th Prime Minister of Slovenia
- 1958 – Tom Waddell, Scottish-American baseball player (died 2019)
- 1960 – John Bottomley, Canadian singer-songwriter (died 2011)
- 1960 – Kevin Clash, American puppeteer
- 1960 – John Franco, American baseball player
- 1960 – Damon Hill, English racing driver and guitarist
- 1960 – Alan Krueger, American economist and academic (died 2019)
- 1961 – Jim Cornette, American wrestling manager and sportscaster
- 1961 – Giorgos Koumoutsakos, Greek politician
- 1961 – Ty Tabor, American rock singer-songwriter and guitarist
- 1962 – Paul Feig, American director, producer, and screenwriter
- 1962 – Baz Luhrmann, Australian director, producer, and screenwriter
- 1962 – Dustin Nguyen, Vietnamese-American actor, director, producer, and screenwriter
- 1962 – Hesham Qandil, Egyptian engineer and politician, 51st Prime Minister of Egypt
- 1962 – Wayne Riley, Australian golfer
- 1962 – BeBe Winans, American singer-songwriter and producer
- 1963 – Masahiro Chono, American-Japanese wrestler and manager
- 1963 – James Urbaniak, American actor, producer, and screenwriter
- 1965 – Kyle Chandler, American actor
- 1965 – Yuji Naka, Japanese video game designer, created Sonic the Hedgehog
- 1965 – Guy Picciotto, American singer-songwriter, guitarist, and producer
- 1965 – Bryan Singer, American director, producer, and screenwriter
- 1966 – Doug E. Fresh, American rapper and producer
- 1967 – Michael Carbajal, American boxer
- 1967 – Malik Yoba, American actor
- 1968 – Anastacia, American singer-songwriter
- 1968 – Cheryl Strayed, American author
- 1968 – Tito Vilanova, Spanish footballer and manager (died 2014)
- 1968 – Valeri Zelepukin, Russian ice hockey player and coach
- 1969 – Adam Devlin, English guitarist and songwriter
- 1969 – Ken Doherty, Irish snooker player
- 1969 – Keith Flint, English singer-songwriter (died 2019)
- 1969 – Matthew Settle, American actor
- 1969 – Paul Varelans, American MMA fighter and wrestler
- 1971 – Nate Berkus, American interior designer and television host
- 1971 – Mike Catt, South African-English rugby player and coach
- 1971 – Andy Edwards, English footballer
- 1971 – Bobby Lee, American actor and comedian
- 1971 – Mauro Milanese, Italian footballer and manager
- 1973 – Diego Albanese, Argentine rugby player
- 1973 – Demis Nikolaidis, Greek footballer
- 1974 – Nona Gaye, American singer, model, and actress
- 1974 – Tormod Granheim, Norwegian skier and explorer
- 1974 – Craig Spence, Australian golfer
- 1974 – Rasheed Wallace, American basketball player and coach
- 1975 – Wilko de Vogt, Dutch footballer
- 1975 – Jimmie Johnson, American race car driver
- 1975 – Pumpkinhead, American rapper (died 2015)
- 1977 – Sam Esmail, American screenwriter
- 1977 – Simone Perrotta, Italian footballer
- 1978 – Nick Cordero, Canadian actor and singer (died 2020)
- 1978 – Shawn Horcoff, Canadian ice hockey player
- 1978 – Arne Slot, Dutch football manager
- 1979 – Steffen Algreen, Danish footballer
- 1979 – Chuck Comeau, Canadian musician
- 1979 – Billy Miller, American actor(died 2023)
- 1979 – Chris Minns, Australian politician, 47th Premier of New South Wales
- 1981 – Bakari Koné, Ivorian footballer
- 1982 – Garth Murray, Canadian ice hockey player
- 1983 – Ice Seguerra, Filipino singer, actor, director, and former chairman of the National Youth Commission of the Philippines (2016–18)
- 1984 – Mary DeScenza, American swimmer
- 1984 – John Kucera, Canadian skier
- 1984 – Patrick van Luijk, Dutch sprinter
- 1985 – Tomáš Berdych, Czech tennis player
- 1985 – Brendan Clarke, Irish footballer
- 1985 – José Gonçalves, Portuguese footballer
- 1985 – Alexander Ovechkin, Russian ice hockey player
- 1985 – Mason Raymond, Canadian ice hockey player
- 1986 – Ravichandran Ashwin, Indian cricketer
- 1986 – Paolo De Ceglie, Italian footballer
- 1986 – Sophie, English music producer, disc jockey and singer (died 2021)
- 1987 – Paul Huntington, English footballer
- 1989 – Danielle Brooks, American actress
- 1989 – Kate Deines, American soccer player
- 1990 – Pixie Geldof, English model and singer
- 1990 – Sean Scannell, English footballer
- 1990 – Marcus Semien, American baseball player
- 1991 – Ryo Ishikawa, Japanese golfer
- 1991 – Mena Massoud, Egyptian-Canadian actor
- 1991 – Egor Yakovlev, Russian ice hockey player
- 1992 – Alfonzo McKinnie, American basketball player
- 1992 – Danny Ramirez, American actor
- 1992 – José Ramírez, Dominican baseball player
- 1993 – Sofiane Boufal, Moroccan footballer
- 1993 – Sophie Howard, Scottish footballer
- 1994 – Na In-woo, South Korean actor
- 1994 – Denyse Tontz, Salvadoran-American actress and singer
- 1995 – Michael Bunting, Canadian ice hockey player
- 1995 – Patrick Mahomes, American football player
- 1995 – Yoo Si-ah, South Korean singer
- 1996 – Duje Ćaleta-Car, Croatian footballer
- 1996 – Esteban Ocon, French Formula One racing driver
- 1996 – Slayyyter, American singer and songwriter
- 1996 – Choi Young-jae, South Korean singer and actor
- 1997 – Auston Matthews, American ice hockey player
- 1998 – Kim Dong-hyun, South Korean singer
- 1999 – Jaimee Fourlis, Australian tennis player
- 1999 – Daniel Huttlestone, English actor
- 2002 – Elina Avanesyan, Russian-Armenian tennis player

== Deaths ==
=== Pre-1600 ===
- 456 – Remistus, Roman general
- 936 – Unni, archbishop of Hamburg-Bremen
- 958 – Li Jingsui, Chinese prince (born 920)
- 1025 – Hugh Magnus, king of France (born 1007)
- 1148 – Conan III, duke of Brittany (born 1070)
- 1179 – Hildegard of Bingen, German abbess and polymath (born 1098)
- 1322 – Robert III, count of Flanders (born 1249)
- 1415 – Michael de la Pole, 2nd Earl of Suffolk (born 1367)
- 1422 – Constantine II, tsar of Bulgaria
- 1482 – William III, duke of Luxembourg (born 1425)
- 1563 – Henry Manners, 2nd Earl of Rutland, English soldier (born 1526)
- 1574 – Pedro Menéndez de Avilés, Spanish admiral and explorer, founded St. Augustine, Florida (born 1519)
- 1575 – Heinrich Bullinger, Swiss theologian and reformer (born 1504)

=== 1601–1900 ===
- 1609 – Judah Loew ben Bezalel, Bohemian rabbi, mystic and philosopher (born 1520)
- 1621 – Robert Bellarmine, Italian cardinal and saint (born 1542)
- 1626 – Johann Schweikhard von Kronberg, German cleric and politician, Archbishop-Elector of Mainz (born 1553)
- 1630 – Thomas Lake, English politician, English Secretary of State (born 1567)
- 1637 – Katherine Clifton, 2nd Baroness Clifton, English-Scottish peer
- 1665 – Philip IV, king of Spain (born 1605)
- 1676 – Sabbatai Zevi, Turkish rabbi and scholar (born 1626)
- 1679 – John of Austria the Younger, Spanish general and politician, Governor of the Habsburg Netherlands (born 1629)
- 1701 – Stanislaus Papczyński, Polish priest and saint (born 1631)
- 1721 – Marguerite Louise d'Orléans, French princess (born 1645)
- 1762 – Francesco Geminiani, Italian violinist and composer (born 1687)
- 1771 – Tobias Smollett, Scottish author and poet (born 1721)
- 1803 – Franz Xaver Süssmayr, Austrian composer and director (born 1766)
- 1808 – Benjamin Bourne, American judge and politician (born 1755)
- 1817 – Jacques Bernard d'Anselme, French general (born 1740)
- 1836 – Antoine Laurent de Jussieu, French botanist and author (born 1748)
- 1852 – Francisco Javier Echeverría, Mexican businessman and politician. President (1841) (born 1797)
- 1858 – Dred Scott, American slave, plaintiff in the Dred Scott Decision (born 1795)
- 1862 – Lawrence O'Bryan Branch, American politician and Confederate general (born 1820)
- 1862 – William E. Starke, Confederate general (born 1814)
- 1863 – Charles Robert Cockerell, English archaeologist and architect (born 1788)
- 1863 – Alfred de Vigny, French author, poet, and playwright (born 1797)
- 1864 – Walter Savage Landor, English author and poet (born 1775)
- 1868 – Roman Nose, Native American warrior (born circa 1823)
- 1877 – Henry Fox Talbot, English photographer, developed the Calotype Process (born 1800)
- 1878 – Orélie-Antoine de Tounens, French lawyer and adventurer (born 1825)
- 1879 – Eugène Viollet-le-Duc, French architect and theorist (born 1814)
- 1892 – Rudolf von Jhering, German jurist (born 1818)
- 1894 – Deng Shichang, Chinese captain (born 1849)
- 1899 – Charles Alfred Pillsbury, American businessman, co-founded the Pillsbury Company (born 1842)

=== 1901–present ===
- 1907 – Ignaz Brüll, Czech-Austrian pianist and composer (born 1846)
- 1907 – Edmonia Lewis, American sculptor (born 1844)
- 1908 – Henri Julien, Canadian cartoonist (born 1852)
- 1908 – Thomas Selfridge, American lieutenant and pilot (born 1882)
- 1909 – Thomas Bent, Australian businessman and politician, 22nd Premier of Victoria (born 1838)
- 1923 – Stefanos Dragoumis, Greek judge and politician, 92nd Prime Minister of Greece (born 1842)
- 1933 – Joseph De Piro, Maltese priest and missionary (born 1877)
- 1936 – Ettie Annie Rout, New Zealand author and activist (born 1877)
- 1937 – Walter Dubislav, German logician and philosopher of science, Vienna circle member (born 1895)
- 1938 – Bruno Jasieński, Polish poet and author (born 1901)
- 1944 – Friedrich Zickwolff, German general (born 1893)
- 1948 – Ruth Benedict, American anthropologist and academic (born 1887)
- 1948 – Folke Bernadotte, Swedish soldier and diplomat (born 1895)
- 1951 – Jimmy Yancey, American pianist and composer (born 1898)
- 1953 – David Munson, American runner (born 1884)
- 1953 – Hans Feige, German general (Wehrmacht) (born 1880)
- 1961 – Adnan Menderes, Turkish lawyer and politician, 9th Prime Minister of Turkey (born 1899)
- 1965 – Alejandro Casona, Spanish poet and playwright (born 1903)
- 1966 – Fritz Wunderlich, German tenor and actor (born 1930)
- 1971 – Carlos Lamarca, Brazilian captain (born 1937)
- 1972 – Akim Tamiroff, American actor (born 1899)
- 1973 – Hugo Winterhalter, American bandleader and composer (born 1909)
- 1975 – Nicola Moscona, Greek-American operatic bass (born 1907)
- 1980 – Anastasio Somoza Debayle, Nicaraguan commander and politician, 73rd President of Nicaragua (born 1925)
- 1982 – Manos Loïzos, Egyptian-Greek composer (born 1937)
- 1983 – Humberto Sousa Medeiros, Portuguese-American cardinal (born 1915)
- 1984 – Richard Basehart, American actor and director (born 1914)
- 1985 – Laura Ashley, Welsh fashion designer, founded Laura Ashley plc (born 1925)
- 1991 – Zino Francescatti, French violinist and composer (born 1902)
- 1992 – Roger Wagner, American conductor and educator (born 1914)
- 1993 – Willie Mosconi, American pool player and actor (born 1913)
- 1993 – Christian Nyby, American director and producer (born 1913)
- 1994 – John Delafose, American accordion player (born 1939)
- 1994 – Vitas Gerulaitis, American tennis player and coach (born 1954)
- 1994 – Karl Popper, Austrian-English philosopher and academic (born 1902)
- 1995 – Isadore Epstein, Estonian-American astronomer and academic (born 1919)
- 1995 – Lucien Victor, Belgian cyclist (born 1931)
- 1996 – Spiro Agnew, American soldier and politician, 39th Vice President of the United States (born 1918)
- 1997 – Red Skelton, American actor and comedian (born 1913)
- 1999 – Frankie Vaughan, English singer and actor (born 1928)
- 2000 – Georgiy Gongadze, Georgian-Ukrainian journalist and director (born 1969)
- 2003 – Erich Hallhuber, German actor (born 1951)
- 2005 – Jacques Lacarrière, French journalist and critic (born 1925)
- 2005 – Alfred Reed, American composer and educator (born 1921)
- 2011 – Colin Madigan, Australian architect and author, designed the National Gallery of Australia (born 1921)
- 2012 – Melvin Charney, Canadian sculptor and architect (born 1935)
- 2013 – Kristian Gidlund, Swedish drummer and journalist (born 1983)
- 2013 – Larry Lake, American-Canadian trumpet player and composer (born 1943)
- 2013 – Bernie McGann, Australian saxophonist and composer (born 1937)
- 2013 – Alex Naumik, Lithuanian-Norwegian singer-songwriter and producer (born 1949)
- 2013 – Michael J. Noonan, Irish farmer and politician, 25th Irish Minister of Defence (born 1935)
- 2013 – Marvin Rainwater, American singer-songwriter (born 1925)
- 2013 – Eiji Toyoda, Japanese businessman (born 1913)
- 2014 – George Hamilton IV, American singer-songwriter and guitarist (born 1937)
- 2014 – Andriy Husin, Ukrainian footballer and manager (born 1972)
- 2014 – Wakachichibu Komei, Japanese sumo wrestler (born 1939)
- 2014 – Charles Read, Australian air marshal (born 1918)
- 2014 – Peter von Bagh, Finnish historian, director, and screenwriter (born 1943)
- 2014 – China Zorrilla, Uruguayan actress (born 1922)
- 2015 – Ingrīda Andriņa, Latvian actress (born 1944)
- 2015 – Dettmar Cramer, German footballer and manager (born 1925)
- 2015 – Vadim Kuzmin, Russian physicist and academic (born 1937)
- 2015 – David Willcocks, English organist, composer, and conductor (born 1919)
- 2016 – Bahman Golbarnezhad, Iranian racing cyclist (born 1968)
- 2016 – Sigge Parling, Swedish footballer (born 1936)
- 2017 – Bobby Heenan, American professional wrestling manager (born 1944)
- 2019 – Cokie Roberts, American journalist and bestselling author (born 1943)
- 2020 – Robert W. Gore, American engineer and businessman, co-inventor of Gore-Tex (born 1937)
- 2021 – Abdelaziz Bouteflika, Algerian politician, President of Algeria (born 1937)
- 2022 – Maarten Schmidt, Dutch astronomer (born 1929)
- 2024 – Nelson DeMille, American lieutenant and author (born 1943)
- 2024 – Neil King Jr., American journalist and author (born 1959)
- 2024 – JD Souther, American singer, songwriter, and actor (born 1945)
- 2025 – Roger Climpson, English-Australian journalist and television host (born 1932)
- 2026 – Jon Kyl, American politician and lobbyist (born 1942)
- 2026 – Duncan Sheik, American singer-songwriter and composer (born 1969)

== Holidays and observances ==
- Australian Citizenship Day
- Christian feast day:
  - Albert of Vercelli
  - Ariadne of Phrygia
  - Blessed Cecilia Eusepi
  - Stanislaus Papczyński
  - Hildegard of Bingen
  - Lambert
  - Robert Bellarmine
  - Satyrus of Milan
  - Socrates and Stephen
  - Zygmunt Szczęsny Feliński
  - September 17 (Eastern Orthodox liturgics)
- Constitution Day and Citizenship Day, observed on the previous Friday if it falls on a Saturday, the following Monday if on a Sunday; and the beginning of the Constitution Week (United States)
- Heroes' Day (Angola)
- Marathwada Liberation Day (Maharashtra)
- National Unity Day (Belarus) (since 2021)
- Operation Market Garden Anniversary is still remembered with parachuting and dedications on this day. (Netherlands)
