= Alpha Kappa Delta =

International honor society for sociology

- ΑΚΔ
- Founded: November 21, 1920; 105 years ago University of Southern California
- Type: Honor
- Affiliation: ACHS
- Status: Active
- Emphasis: Sociology
- Scope: International
- Motto: Anthropon Katamanthanein Diakonesein "To investigate humanity for the purpose of service"
- Colors: Teal
- Publication: Sociological Inquiry
- Chapters: 4 active, 702 chartered
- Members: 80,000+ active 152,000+ lifetime
- Headquarters: 2507 James Street, Suite #210; Syracuse, New York 13206; United States
- Website: alphakappadelta.org

Alpha Kappa Delta (ΑΚΔ) is an international honor society of sociology. It was founded by Emory S. Bogardus at the University of Southern California in 1920. It has over 152,000 members across more than 700 chapters worldwide. It is a member of the Association of College Honor Societies.

== History ==
In 1915, one of the earliest American collegiate sociology departments was created at the University of Southern California, under the direction of Professor Emory S. Bogardus. Wanting to support the new program with a forum for students and faculty to discuss sociological research, Bogardus created Alpha Kappa Delta (AKD) on November 21, 1920 and served as its first president. Alpha Kappa Delta initially consisted of fourteen students and faculty members. Alpha Kappa Delta's primary goal is to advance social research for service.

In 1921, Bogardus contacted a select group of American universities, inviting them to join Alpha Kappa Delta. Three schools created an AKD chapter: the University of Wisconsin, Northwestern University, and the University of Kansas. These three schools, along with the University of Southern California, became the United Chapters of Alpha Kappa Delta in 1924.

During the 1930s and 1940s, the leaders of Alpha Kappa Delta, namely Kimball Young, Reed Bain, and Luther L. Bernard, attempted to increase membership. This effort was tested by World War II which dropped both membership and attendance at organizational meetings. Bernard led Alpha Kappa Delta through these trying years until Andrea B. Hollingshead was elected Alpha Kappa Delta's president in 1948. In 1967, it joined the Association of College Honor Societies.

As of 2024, Alpha Kappa Delta has initiated more than 152,000 members. However, the society closed most of its active chapters in 2024, with several of the surviving chapters consolidating in 2023. Its national headquarters are located at 2507 James Street in Syracuse, New York.

== Symbols ==
The name Alpha Kappa Delta was chosen by Bogardus and represents the first letters of three Greek words Anthropon, which translates to "humankind"; Katamanthanein, which translates to "to investigate thoroughly"; and Diakonesein, which translates to "for the purpose of service".

The society's motto is Anthropon Katamanthanein Diakonesein or "To investigate humanity for the purpose of service". The society's emblem is a key that was designed by Melvin J. Vincent in 1920. In 1924 Gertrude A. Stephens wrote the lyrics to Alpha Kappa Delta's hymn in conjunction with Charles H. Gabriel who composed the music.

Alpha Kappa Delta's color is teal. Its quarterly publication is Sociological Inquiry.

== Chapters ==
As of 2024, Alpha Kappa Delta has chartered 702 chapters, with four chapters being active. Chapters are only allowed at institution with two fulltime sociology professors and a graduate program in sociology.

== Membership ==
Membership in Alpha Kappa Delta is open to juniors and seniors who are sociology majors who are in the top 35 percent of their class with a minimum 3.0 grade point average. Graduate students studying sociology may also join if they have completed half of their coursework with a 3.0 GPA or better. Staff members of institutions with chapters may also join if they meet the undergraduate or graduate requirement and either work in sociology or have a Ph.D.

== Governance ==
Alpha Kappa Delta is governed by an executive committee, including the president, president-elect, vice president, secretary/treasurer, and the editor of Sociological Inquiry.

== Notable members ==
- Robert Cooley Angell, head of sociology at the University of Michigan
- Luther L. Bernard, sociologist and psychologist
- Michael Biber, technologist and industrialist
- Emory S. Bogardus, founder of the sociology department at the University of Southern California
- Jolly Bugarin, retired military officer, lawyer, and criminologist
- Herman George Canady, psychologist
- Jon Favreau, political pundit and speechwriter
- Richard LaPiere, professor of sociology at Stanford University
- Patricia Yancey Martin, professor of sociology at Florida State University.
- Daniel J. Myers, president of Misericordia University
- Carolyn C. Perrucci, head of women's studies program at Purdue University
- Marvin Scott, politician and academic
- Rosemarie Skaine, sociologist and author
- Samuel Woodrow Williams, civil rights activist
- Kimball Young, chair of sociology at Queens College and Northwestern University.

== See also ==
- Honor cords
