= Territorial Prelature of Santiago Apóstol de Huancané =

Division of the Roman Catholic Church in Peru

Territorial Prelature of Santiago Apóstol de Huancané Praelatura Territorialis Iacobus Apostolus Huancanensis
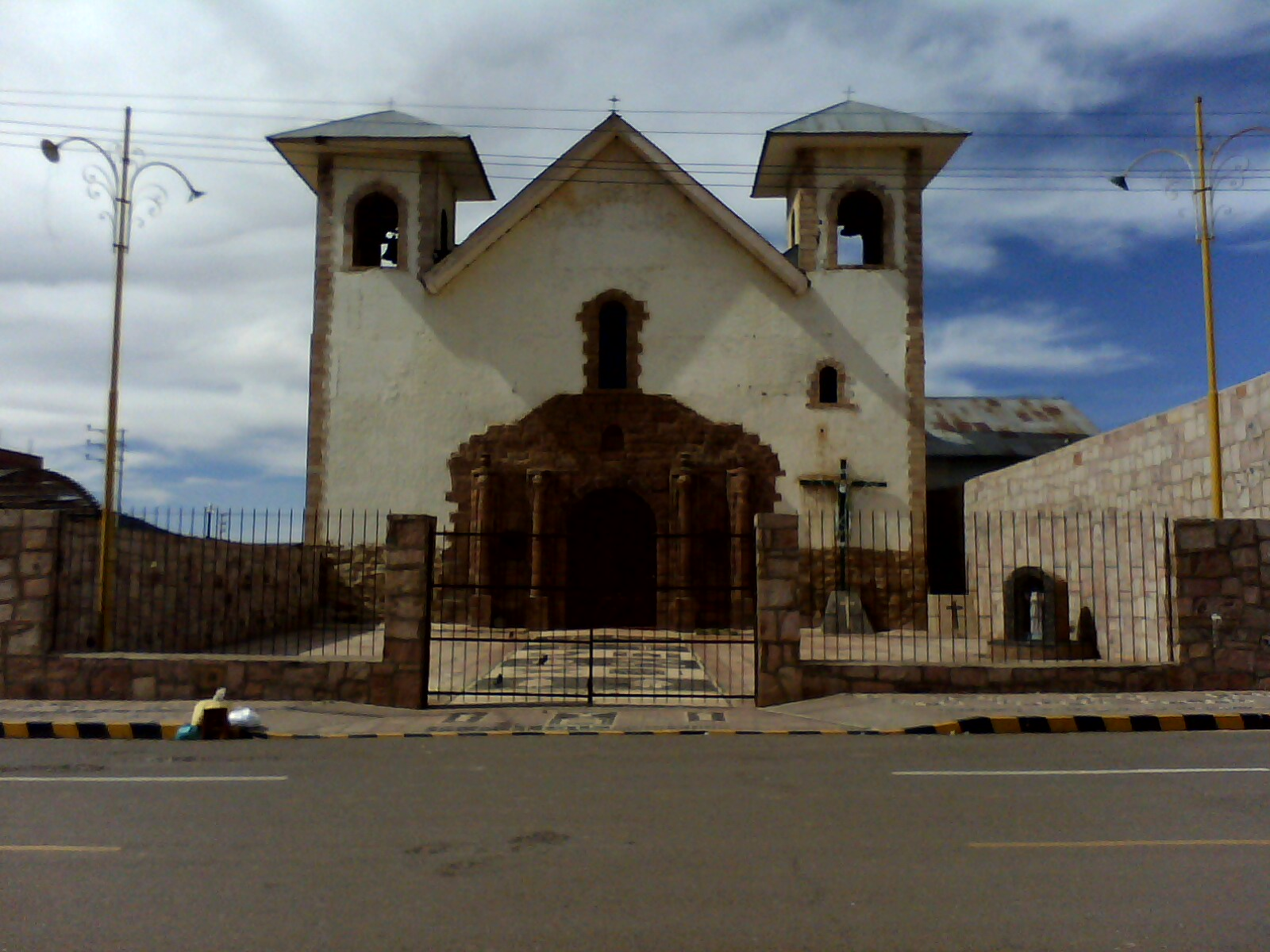
- Santiago Apóstol Cathedral

Location
- Country: Peru
- Ecclesiastical province: Arequipa

Statistics
- Area: 18,881 km^{2} (7,290 sq mi)
- Population: Total; Catholics: (as of 2019); 200,489; 170,415 (85.0%)

Information
- Rite: Latin Rite
- Cathedral: Santiago Apóstol Cathedral in Huancané

Current leadership
- Bishop: Giovanni Cefai, M.S.S.P.

The Territorial Prelature of Santiago Apóstol de Huancané (Latin: Praelatura Territorialis Iacobus Apostolus Huancanensis) is a Roman Catholic territorial prelature located in the city of Huancané in the ecclesiastical province of Arequipa in Peru.

== History ==
On 3 April 2019, the Territorial Prelature of Santiago Apóstol de Huancané was established from the Roman Catholic Territorial Prelature of Ayaviri and Roman Catholic Territorial Prelature of Juli.

== Ordinaries ==
- Prelates of Santiago Apóstol de Huancané (Roman rite)
  - Giovanni Cefai, M.S.S.P. (3 April 2019 – present)
