= St. Paul's Missionary College (Australia) =

St. Paul's Missionary College, located on Norton's Lane, Wantirna South, in Melbourne, Australia (37.8834°S 145.1988°E), is the formation house of the Missionary Society of St Paul in Australia. This venue is also home to a retreat site and spirituality centre, the St Paul's Retreat Centre.

== History ==
The Catholic congregation's first missionary, Austin Grech, arrived in Australia in 1948. The College followed in 1950, initially to help Maltese immigrants. Today, it serves a larger migrant population.

== Location ==
The college lies in a rural location outside Knox City. Initially, it consisted of a house and a chapel. However. a larger facility was built in the 1980s and opened in 1989. The college runs prayer groups, provides marriage counselling, and hosts retreats, conferences, and workshops.

The college celebrate its 30th birthday in 2001.
