= Cefai =

Cefai is a Maltese surname. Notable people with the surname include:

- Giovanni Cefai (born 1967), prelate of the Catholic Church
- Joseph Cefai (1921–1996), Maltese politician
- Modesta Cefai (disappeared 1911), missing Maltese girl
