= Michael Biber =

American technologist and industrialist (born 1974)

Michael Biber (born July 1974) is an American technologist and industrialist.

== Early life/education ==
Biber was born in Phoenix, AZ. He attended Northern Arizona University for four years studying to go into medicine and was President of Alpha Kappa Delta (National Sociology Honors Society). He graduated in 1997 with a Bachelor of Arts in Sociology and Minor in Chemistry.

== Career ==
In 1997, Biber founded the Corporate Website Company, based in Phoenix Arizona, developing complex n-tier web technologies that rapidly grow and acquired in 1999. Later In 1999, Biber grew a well-respected technology consultancy firm providing the latest web technologies for major construction, engineering, academic, and government organizations to name but a few; AMEC, StructureTone, New York City Board of Education, Rutgers University, Hardesty and Hanover, Block Drug, etc.

In 2001, Biber co-founded Websoft Systems, Inc. focusing on eLearning technologies, and their flagship product KnowledgeBridge, a learning content management system, supported some of the largest Fortune 500 companies, to name a few; Merck & Co., Premier Farnell, Utilicorp, Aquila, etc.

During his career Biber established numerous business centers from non-existence in the United States, India, and Philippines; overcoming small and mid-market competitors, maximized share of niche markets while overcoming complex business challenges.

=== Notable projects ===
In 2007, Biber went to the country of Bhutan establishing relationships with The King of Bhutan's sister H.R.H. Princess Ashi Pem Pem Wangchuck's to step-up financial centers. He worked with Royal Government Information and Communications Minister Leki Dorji and the Head of Royal Human Resources to help establish a long-term vision to employ 2,000+ civilians to work in these centers providing services to the global markets to help credit a middle class. He signed multiple year technology and service agreement with H.R.H. Princess Ashi Pem Pem Wangchuck’s company Drukonnet Business Services in Thimphu Bhutan.

== Awards/recognitions ==
Michael Biber was elected to Global Sourcing Council board.
