= Fourpeaked Glacier =

Glacier in Alaska, United States

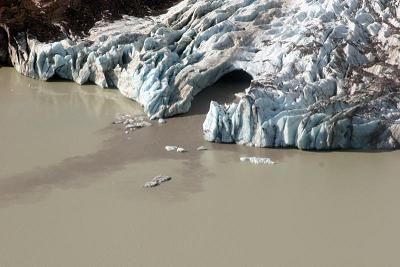
- Terminus of Fourpeaked Glacier with dark-colored sediment issuing from an elongate tunnel in the ice. Photo taken Sept 20, 2006

- Location within Alaska
- Interactive map of Fourpeaked Glacier
- Type: Mountain glacier
- Location: Katmai National Park and Preserve, Alaska, U.S.
- Coordinates: 58°47′16″N 153°31′03″W

Fourpeaked Glacier is a calving glacier in Kodiak Island Borough, Alaska. It is covering much of Fourpeaked Mountain, also known as Fourpeaked Volcano. In the 1950s and up to 1987 Fourpeaked Glacier experienced a dramatic recession which followed by a period of relative stability of it terminus between 1987 and 2000.

== See also ==
- Fourpeaked Mountain

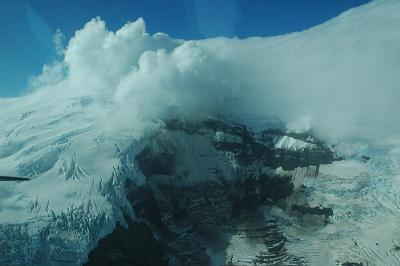
Headwall of Fourpeaked Glacier with steam and volcanic gases rising through vents on Sept. 20, 2006
