= Territorial Prelature of Ayaviri =

Catholic jurisdiction in Peru

Territorial Prelature of Ayaviri Praelatura Territorialis Ayaviriensis

Catholic

Location
- Country: Peru
- Ecclesiastical province: Arequipa

Statistics
- Area: 20,713 km^{2} (7,997 sq mi)
- Population: Total; Catholics: (as of 2019); 179,596; 152,656 (85.0%)

Information
- Sui iuris church: Latin Church
- Rite: Roman Rite

Current leadership
- Bishop: Fray Msgr. Benigno Condori Chuchi, O.F.M.
- Bishops emeritus: Juan Godayol Colom, S.D.B. Kay Martin Schmalhausen Panizo, S.C.V.

Website
- www.prelaturaayaviri.org

The Territorial Prelature of Ayaviri (Latin: Praelatura Territorialis Ayaviriensis) is a Catholic territorial prelature located in the city of Ayaviri in the ecclesiastical province of Arequipa in Peru.

== History ==
On 30 July 1958, the Territorial Prelature of Ayaviri was established from the Diocese of Puno. On 3 April 2019 from its and the Roman Catholic Territorial Prelature of Juli was established the Roman Catholic Territorial Prelature of Santiago Apóstol de Huancané

== Ordinaries ==
- Prelates of Ayaviri (Roman rite)
  - José Juan Luciano Carlos Metzinger Greff, SS.CC. (30 July 1958 – 31 January 1971)
  - Louis Dalle SS.CC. (1970 - 1982)
  - Paco d'Alteroche (1982 - 1993)
  - Juan Godayol Colom, S.D.B. (4 December 1991 – 18 February 2006)
  - Kay Martin Schmalhausen Panizo, S.C.V. (18 February 2006 – 7 April 2021)
  - Benigno Condori Chuchi, O.F.M. (6 January 2025 - Present)
