= Richard LaPiere =

American sociologist

Richard Tracy LaPiere (September 5, 1899 – February 2, 1986) was a professor (and later professor emeritus) of sociology at Stanford University from 1929 to 1965.

== Early years and education ==
Born in Beloit, Wisconsin, LaPiere obtained his B.A. in Economics (1926), followed by his M.A in Sociology (1927) and his Ph.D in Sociology (1930), all at Stanford University.

== ‘Attitudes vs. Actions’ article ==
LaPiere is best known for his 1934 article "Attitudes vs. Actions" that appeared in the journal Social Forces. LaPiere spent two years traveling the United States by car with a couple of Chinese ethnicity. At the time there was substantial anti-Chinese sentiment in the United States, e.g., as reflected in the Chinese Exclusion Act of the late 19th Century.

During that time they visited 251 hotels and restaurants and, while LaPiere reports that some people greeting them looked curious, they were turned away only once. LaPiere concludes that positive reactions were associated with factors unrelated to the race of the couple (such as neat appearance and smiling). and his data reflect his own interpretations of what occurred at each stop.

LaPiere's language and conclusions in the paper reflect his own racial views and awareness gaps of the time. For example, he interprets curiosity as treatment "more positive than typical."

Six months after the conclusion of their travels (to provide a chance to forget their behavior), LaPiere mailed a survey to all of the businesses they visited with the question, "Will you accept members of the Chinese race in your establishment?" The available responses were "Yes", "No", and "Depends upon the circumstances". Of the 128 that responded, 92% answered No, reflecting the anti-Chinese sentiments of the time.

LaPiere also mailed a survey to a comparison group of hotels and restaurants that had not been visited, and their responses were similar.

The study was foundational in establishing the gap between attitudes and behaviors.

== Memberships and accolades ==
LaPiere was an elected member of Alpha Kappa Delta and the Sociological Research Association, and a past president of the Pacific Sociological Association. In 1941 he was awarded a California Book Award silver medal for his fiction work When the Living Strive.

== Personal life ==
LaPiere married in 1934 and died of cancer in 1986. The Department of Sociology at Stanford University's annual research award for best graduate student paper is named in LaPiere's honor.

== Selected bibliography ==
- The Freudian ethic (1959) ISBN 0-8371-7543-7
- Collective Behavior (1938) ISBN 1-4304-8123-4
- Son of Han (1936)
- A Theory of Social Control (1954)
