= Emory S. Bogardus =

American sociologist (1882–1973)

Emory Stephen Bogardus
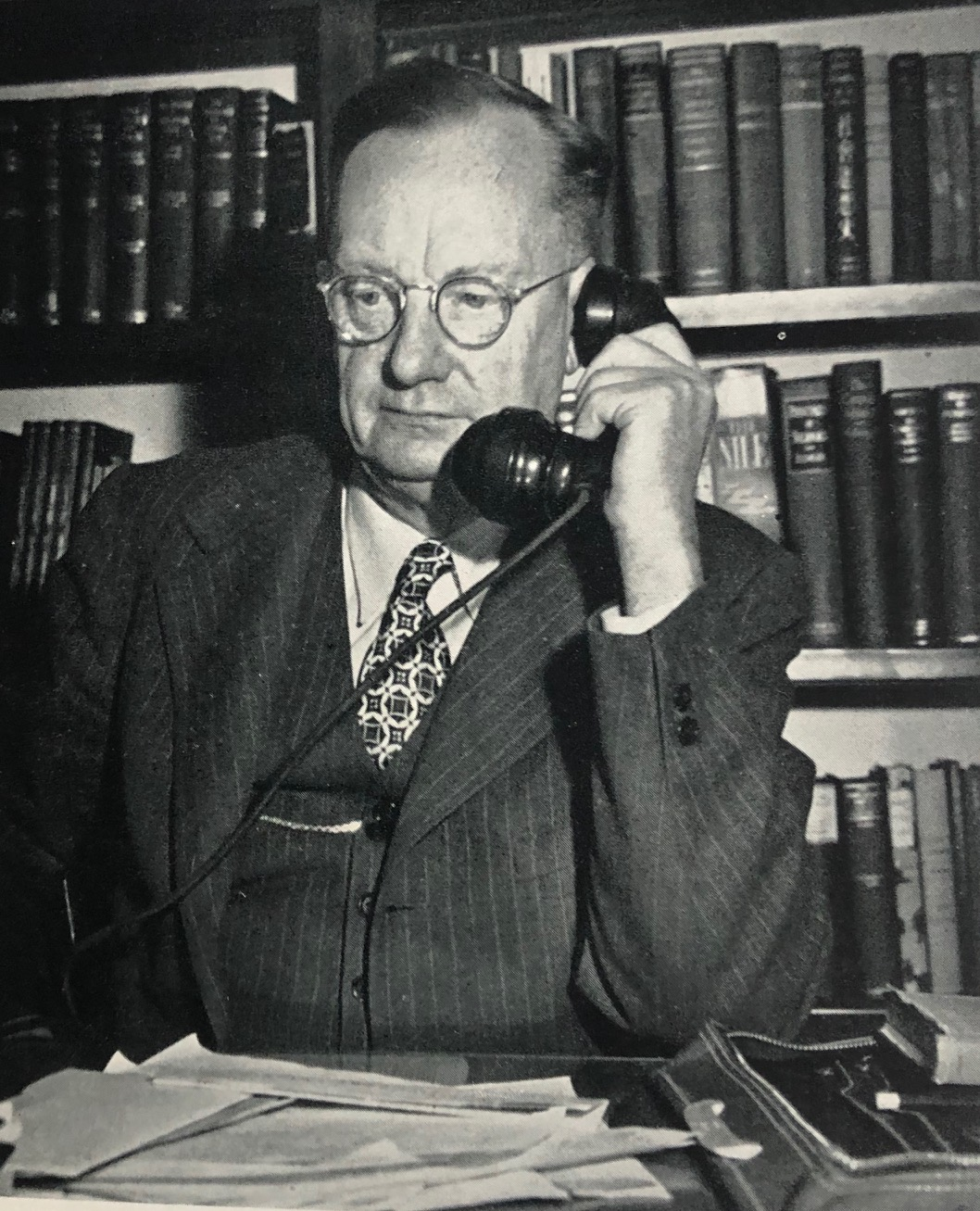
- Born: 21 February 1882; Belvidere, Illinois, US
- Died: 21 August 1973 (aged 91)
- Education: Northwestern University; University of Chicago
- Known for: Bogardus Social Distance Scale
- Scientific career
- Institutions: University of Southern California

Emory Stephen Bogardus (born near Belvidere, Illinois, February 21, 1882 – August 21, 1973) was an American sociologist. He founded one of the first sociology departments at an American university, at the University of Southern California in 1915.

== Education and career ==
Bogardus received his bachelor's and master's degrees at Northwestern University in 1908 and 1909, respectively. He received a Ph.D. from the University of Chicago in 1911.

Immediately after earning his doctorate, Bogardus joined the faculty of the University of Southern California as a professor of sociology, helping to establish an independent sociology department there in 1915. He also developed a sociological principle known as the Bogardus Social Distance Scale.

”He conducted pioneer studies of Mexican immigration [to the United States], labor, education and settlement patterns in the Southwest” in the early 20th century.

== Extracurricular activities ==
In addition to his work in the field, Bogardus also engaged in many activities designed to strengthen the discipline of sociology through social organizations. In 1920, he founded Alpha Kappa Delta, the international sociology honor society and was national president of that organization from 1924 to 1925, 1926–1927, and 1946–1947. In 1929, he co-founded the Pacific Sociological Association. In 1931, he served as president of the American Sociological Society. He is one of the honorees of the California Social Work Hall of Distinction.

== Publications ==
During his lengthy academic career, Bogardus authored 24 books and over 250 articles of varying lengths. His books are as follows (multiple dates indicate various editions):

- Introduction to the Social Sciences, 1913, 1922
- Introduction to Sociology, 1913, 1927, 1931. Title was changed to Sociology in the 1934 revised edition and was revised again in 1941.
- Essentials of Social Psychology, 1917, 1923
- A History of Social Thought, 1922, 1929
- The New Social Research, 1923, 1927
- Fundamentals of Social Psychology, 1924, 1941
- The Survey of Race Relations on the Pacific Coast, 1926
- Social Problems and Social Processes, edited, 1933
- Contemporary Sociology, 1931;
- Leaders and Leadership, 1934;
- Essentials of Americanization, 1919,1923
- Immigration and Race Attitudes, 1928
- The Mexican in the United States, 1934
- The City Boy and His Problems, 1926
- Introduction to Social Research, 1936
- The Development of Social Thought, 1940, 1947
- Fundamentals of Social Psychology, 1941
- Principles of Cooperation, 1952, 1964

He was also the founder of The Journal of Sociology and Social Research, which he edited for 45 years.
