= Robert Cooley Angell =

American sociologist (1899–1984)

Robert Cooley Angell (April 29, 1899 – May 12, 1984) was an American sociologist and educator. Committed to the advancement of rigorous social scientific research, Angell's work focused on social integration and the pursuit of a more peaceful world order. Angell was president of the American Sociological Society and the International Sociological Association.

== Early life ==
Angell was born on April 29, 1899, in Detroit, Michigan. His father Alexis Caswell Angell, was a lawyer. His grandfather, James Burrill Angell, was president of the University of Vermont (1866–1871) and the University of Michigan (1871–1909). His maternal grandfather was Thomas Cooley, University of Michigan Law School dean and chief justice of the Michigan Supreme Court.

Angell attended the Liggett School and Central High School, in downtown Detroit. His summers were spent in Seal Harbor, Maine playing tennis, hiking and sailing—activities he avidly pursued throughout his life. He suffered with a persistent stutter.

He attended college at The University of Michigan in 1917. Angell was a member of Phi Beta Kappa and Delta Kappa Epsilon. His studies were interrupted in by World War I in 1918, when he enlisted in the U.S. Army Air Service and received a commission as 2nd Lieutenant in May 1919. After serving in the Army, he returned to the university, earning his B.A. in 1921, M.A. In 1922, and Ph.D. in 1924. His thesis, which was about the student mind, was published under the title The Campus in 1928.

After graduation from college, he spent a semester at Harvard Law School. However, the study of law did not take and Angell returned to study sociology at the University of Michigan.

== Career ==
Angell was appointed lecturer in 1922 and assistant professor of sociology in 1924 at the University of Michigan (sociology was then under the jurisdiction of Economics). He worked with his uncle and mentor Charles Horton Cooley. In 1930, He became associate professor. In 1935 he became a full professor of sociology.

Angell was chairman of the Sociology Department at the University of Michigan from 1940 to 1951. During this time he was instrumental in bringing Theodore Newcomb and Ronald Freedman to the department, as well as the groups that formed the Survey Research Center and the Research Center for Group Dynamics.

During World War II, Angell served in the United States Army Air Forces, as a captain from 1942 to 1943, a major from 1943 to 1944, and a Lieutenant Colonel from 1944 to 1945, earning a Bronze Star Medal in 1944.

Angell edited the American Sociological Review from 1946 to 1948. He was elected president of the American Sociological Association in 1951. He served abroad as director of UNESCO's Social Science Department in Paris from 1949 to1950, heading up a project on world tensions. As a result of this work, Angell was instrumental in founding the International Sociological Association and served as the organization's second president from 1953 to 1956.

Angell served as director of the University of Michigan Honors Council, initiating a new four-year program for gifted students in the Literary College from 1957 to 1960, and as director of the Center for Research on Conflict Resolution (1959), and the Journal of Conflict Resolution (1957), both of which he also helped found.

He retired as a professor emeritus in 1969. In retirement, Angell continued to teach at the University of Michigan until his death.

Angell was a member of Alpha Kappa Delta, American Sociological Association, Sociological Research Association, the Michigan Sociological Association, the American Association of University Professors, and American Civil Liberties Union.

== Awards and honors ==
- Bronze Star Medal, 1944
- Deiches Lecturer, Johns Hopkins University, Spring, 1957
- Faculty Award for Distinguished Achievement, University of Michigan, 1958
- Doctor of Humanities, Western Michigan. University, 1967

== Personal life ==
In December 1922, Angell married Esther Kennedy, University of Michigan class of 1922. They had two children, James Kennedy Angell and Sarah Caswell Angell Parsons. The family lived in Ann Arbor.

He died on May 12, 1984, at St. Joseph Mercy Hospital in Ann Arbor at the age of 88.

== Publications ==
- The Student Mind, Ph.D., University of Michigan, pp. iii + 179. "Report on Methods in the University of Michigan, "(Mimeographed), University of Michigan, pp. 21;published as: "Increasing the Intellectual Interest of Students, "Mich. Alum., 31 (1924-25): 219–20, 230–32, 249, 254–56, 272–75.
- "Student Participation in the Solution of Curricular and Administrative Problems at Michigan, "Christian Ed., 10 (1927): 226-31
- The Campus: A study of Contemporary Undergraduate Life in the American University. New York and London: D. Appleton and Co., 1928, pp. ix + 239
- "The Roots of College Evils, " Forum, 79 (1928) : 419–26.
- "A Study in Undergraduate Adjustment, " Pub. Amer. Sociol. Soc., 23 (1929) : 181–86.
- The Family Encounters The Depression. 1936, Charles Scribner's Sons
- The Integration of American Society: The Study of Groups and Institutions. 1941, McGraw-Hill Publications – Sociology
- The Use of Personal Documents in History, Anthropology and Sociology. 1945, with Louis Gottschalk and Clyde Kluckholn
- The Moral Integration of American Cities. 1951, University of Chicago Press
- Free Society and Moral Crisis. 1958, University of Michigan Press
- Peace on the March. 1969, Van Nostrand Reinhold Company
- The Quest for World Order. 1979, University of Michigan Press
