= Giovanni Cefai =

Maltese prelate

His Excellency, The Most Reverend Giovanni Cefai MSSP
- Territorial Prelate of Santiago Apóstol de Huancané
- Church: Catholic Church (Latin Rite)
- Diocese: Santiago Apóstol de Huancané
- Appointed: 3 April 2019
- Installed: 30 June 2019

Orders
- Ordination: 6 December 1997 by Nikol Ġużeppi Cauchi
- Consecration: 22 June 2019 by Javier Augusto Del Río Alba; Nicola Girasoli; Héctor Miguel Cabrejos Vidarte, O.F.M.

Personal details
- Born: 5 August 1967 (age 59) Żebbuġ, Gozo, Malta
- Denomination: Catholic
- Motto: Misericordes sicut et Pater
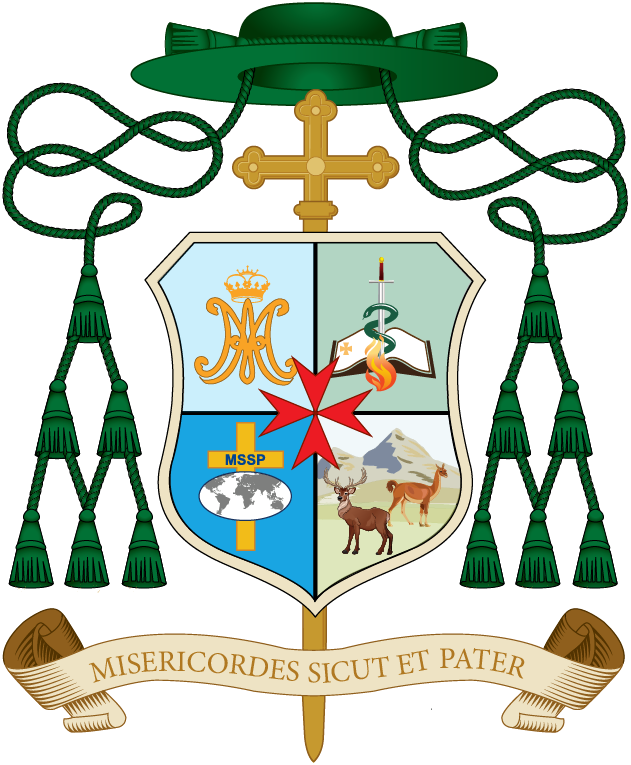
- Coat of arms

Styles of Monsignor Giovanni Cefai, MSSP
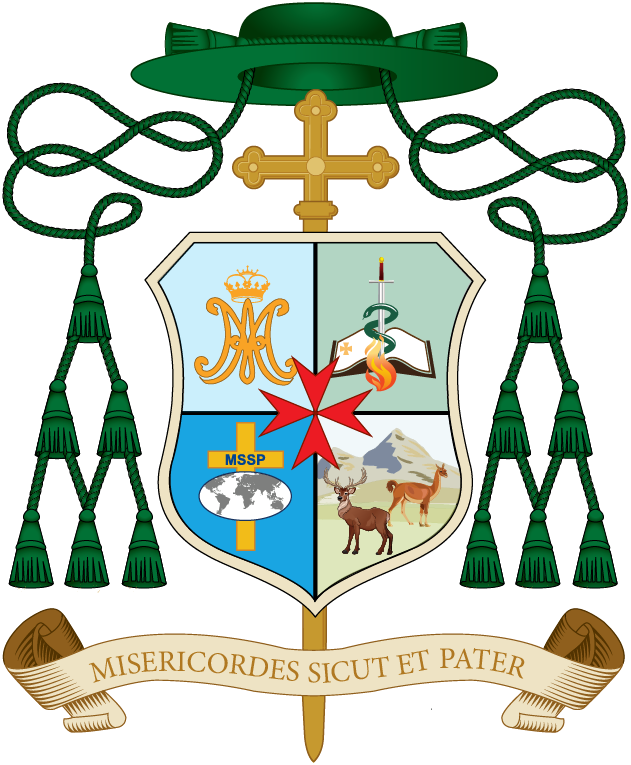
- Reference style: His Excellency; The Most Reverend
- Spoken style: Your Excellency

Giovanni Cefai, MSSP (born 05 August 1967) is a Maltese prelate who heads the Territorial prelature of Santiago Apóstol de Huancané. Cefai was born on 5 August 1967 in Żebbuġ, in the island of Gozo in Malta. He is a priest with the Missionary Society of Saint Paul, and is the first priest of the society to be given the episcopal orders.

== Early life and vocation ==
Rev. Giovanni Cefai was born in Żebbuġ in Gozo on 5 August 1967, and joined the Missionary Society of St Paul (MSSP) in 1984 and took his solemn vows ten years later. He followed preparatory courses in Campion House in London Rhy’s McLaughlin and studied at the Faculty of Theology (Philosophy and Theology) at the University of Malta where he specialised in Pastoral Theology. He was ordained into the priesthood on 6 December 1997 by then Bishop of Gozo Mgr Ġużeppi Cauchi in the Cathedral of the Assumption.

During his priesthood, Rev. Cefai served as director of the De Piro Youth Animation Centre in Malta and was parish priest of the parishes of Santa Cruz and San Pablo Apóstol, both in Arequipa. He was also regional superior of the St Paul Missionary Society in Peru.

== Appointment and consecration ==
On 3 April 2019, Rev. Cefai was appointed Territorial Prelate of the newly-set up Santiago Apóstol de Huancané, an area that encompasses twenty parishes spread across 18,000 square kilometers with a population of around 200,000 people, 85% of whom are Catholic.

Cefai was consecrated bishop in the Basilica Cathedral of Arequipa, in Peru. This made him the first priest of the MSSP to be consecrated bishop. His principal consecrator was His Excellency Javier Augusto Del Río Alba, Archbishop of Arequipa. The other two principal co-consecrators were: Archbishop Nicola Girasoli (Titular Archbishop of Egnazia Appula, and Apostolic Nuncio to Peru) and Archbishop Héctor Miguel Cabrejos Vidarte, O.F.M. Archbishop of Trujillo.

At the close of the ceremony, Bishop Cefai sent a message to the Maltese people, stating: "From the Cathedral of Arequipa, I would like to thank you sincerely for being here, for your love, greetings, prayers and support. For my part, I am humbled and I promise you my prayers. I will pray for you, for your intentions, for your families. May God bless you and protect you. Thank you for your wishes and for being here with us."

In an interview with pontifical foundation, Aid to the Church in Need, he spoke about the prelature, saying: "Many of these people feel abandoned. Therefore, we should, as Pope Francis says, go to the furthest reaches of the world in search of the people of God, to tell them: ‘Courage, brothers. God is merciful, God is love, and He will never abandon you’.” He added further, “We are starting from zero. We lack classrooms, schools, chapels, homes for the priests to live with some dignity… But a missionary never stops dreaming, he never loses hope. He places his hope in God and in benefactors.” Many pressing problems in the prelature, he says, include coca production and pollution from illegal mining.
