= Sociological Inquiry =

- Discipline: Sociology
- Language: English
- Edited by: Peter B. Wood

Publication details
- Former name(s): The Quarterly (1928-1932, 1936-1954); The Newsletter (1933-1936); Alpha Kappa Deltan: A Sociological Journal (1955-1960)
- History: 1928-present
- Publisher: Wiley-Blackwell on behalf of Alpha Kappa Delta
- Frequency: Quarterly
- Impact factor: 0.608 (2018)

Standard abbreviations
- ISO 4: Sociol. Inq.

Indexing
- ISSN: 0038-0245 (print); 1475-682X (web)
- LCCN: sf81005078
- OCLC no.: 474577790

Links
- Journal homepage; Online access; Online archive

Sociological Inquiry is a quarterly peer-reviewed academic journal published by Wiley-Blackwell on behalf of Alpha Kappa Delta. The journal explores the human condition through a sociological lens. It was established in 1928 as The Quarterly and obtained its current title in 1961. The editor-in-chief is Peter B. Wood (Eastern Michigan University). According to the Journal Citation Reports, the journal has a 2018 impact factor of 0.608, ranking it 123rd out of 148 journals in the category "Sociology".
