= Remarks at the Islamic Center of Washington =

2001 speech by George W. Bush

- Part of the aftermath of the September 11 attacks
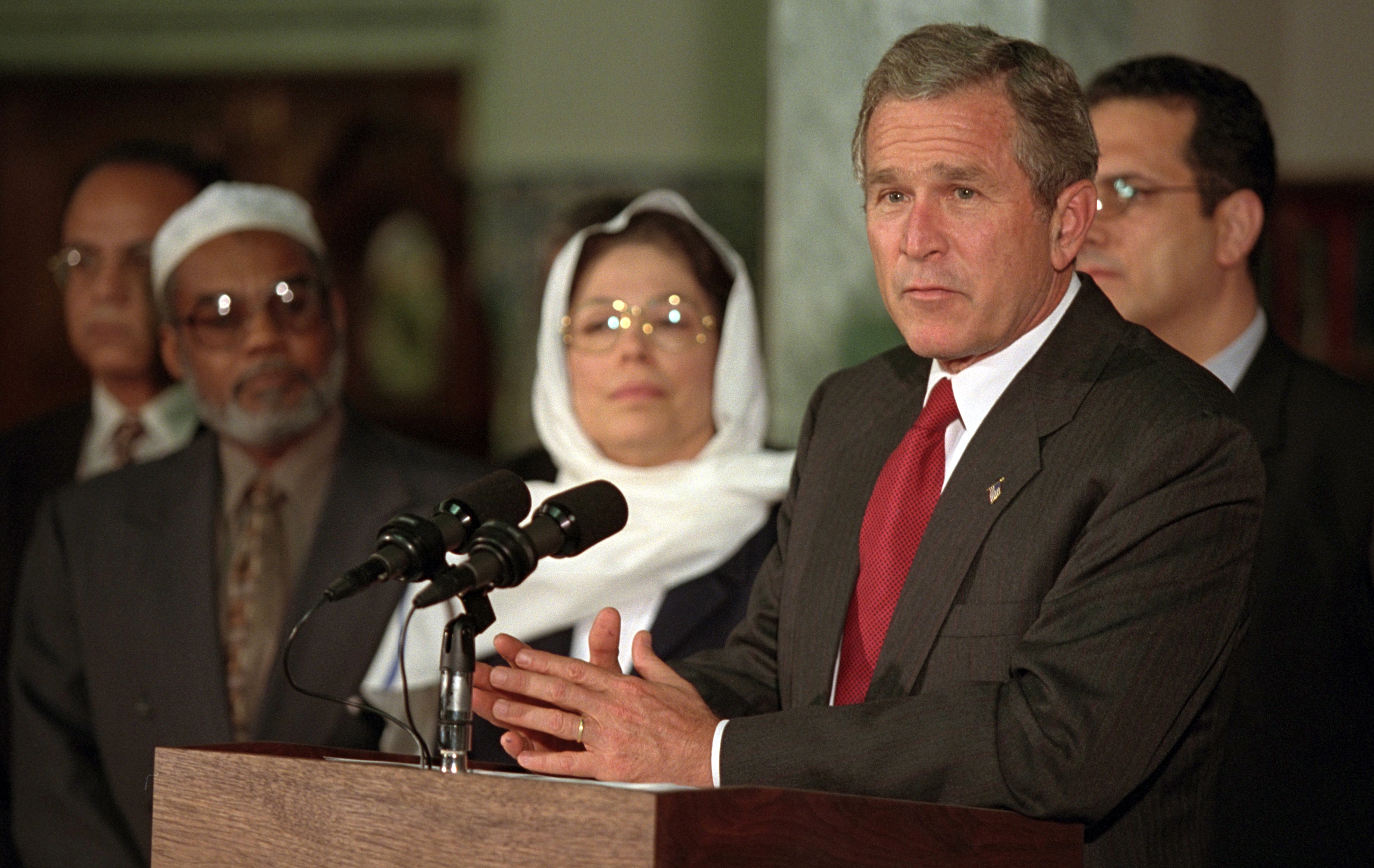
- Bush delivering the speech
- Date: September 17, 2001
- Venue: Islamic Center of Washington
- Location: Washington, D.C.
- Participants: George W. Bush
- The full text of the speech at Wikisource

On September 17, 2001—six days after al-Qaeda's September 11 attacks on the World Trade Center and the Pentagon—George W. Bush, then president of the United States, delivered remarks at the Islamic Center of Washington (also called the speech at the Islamic Center of Washington or "Islam Is Peace"), a speech that affirmed that the vast majority of Muslims were unassociated with, and moreover were horrified by al-Qaeda and their September 11 attacks. He said Islamic terrorism contravened Muslim values because "Islam is peace". Bush praised Muslims in the United States for their contributions to society and noted that some feared they would become the targets of harassment or violence from Americans upset about the September 11 attacks. He condemned such Islamophobia and said American Muslims "love America just as much as I do".

Compared to the days preceding Bush's speech, the number of hate crimes committed against Muslims decreased after his remarks. Some conservative Christians criticized the Bush administration for differentiating between Islam in general and terrorist organizations such as al-Qaeda. Sociologists Rosemarie Skaine and Louise Cainkar respectively praised and criticized Bush. Skaine argued that the speech was an example of how Bush had generally helped reduce Islamophobia in the United States. According to Cainkar, although the address was a "positive speech", Bush undermined it in different speeches that characterized Muslims as hostile to America.

== Background ==
George W. Bush, an Evangelical Christian and Republican who was the 43rd president of the United States, made his first public comments as president about Islam in early 2001 (before the September 11 attacks) as part of a statement commemorating the Muslim holiday of Eid al-Adha. It was the first American presidential statement issued for Eid al-Adha, and Bush praised the "variety of nations and cultures represented by those who travel to Mecca each year" as "reminders that ethnic and racial differences need not divide us when we share common values and purposes".

On September 11, 2001, Islamist organization al-Qaeda attacked the World Trade Center and the Pentagon in the United States using hijacked airplanes, killing nearly three thousand people in what has been called the "worst terrorist incident in the history of the United States". Bush had not spoken publicly about Islam since his Eid al-Adha statement. After the September 11 attacks, he worried some Americans might lash out against Muslims. Muslims in the United States had long faced prejudices and Islamophobia, and from the 1980s onward a popular American media stereotype conflated Muslims in general with the idea of "terrorists". While interacting with journalists on September 13, he urged Americans to be respectful to Arab Americans and Muslim Americans. On September 14, which he had declared a National Day of Prayer, Bush spoke at a memorial service alongside Muzammil H. Siddiqi, a Muslim imam.

== Speech ==
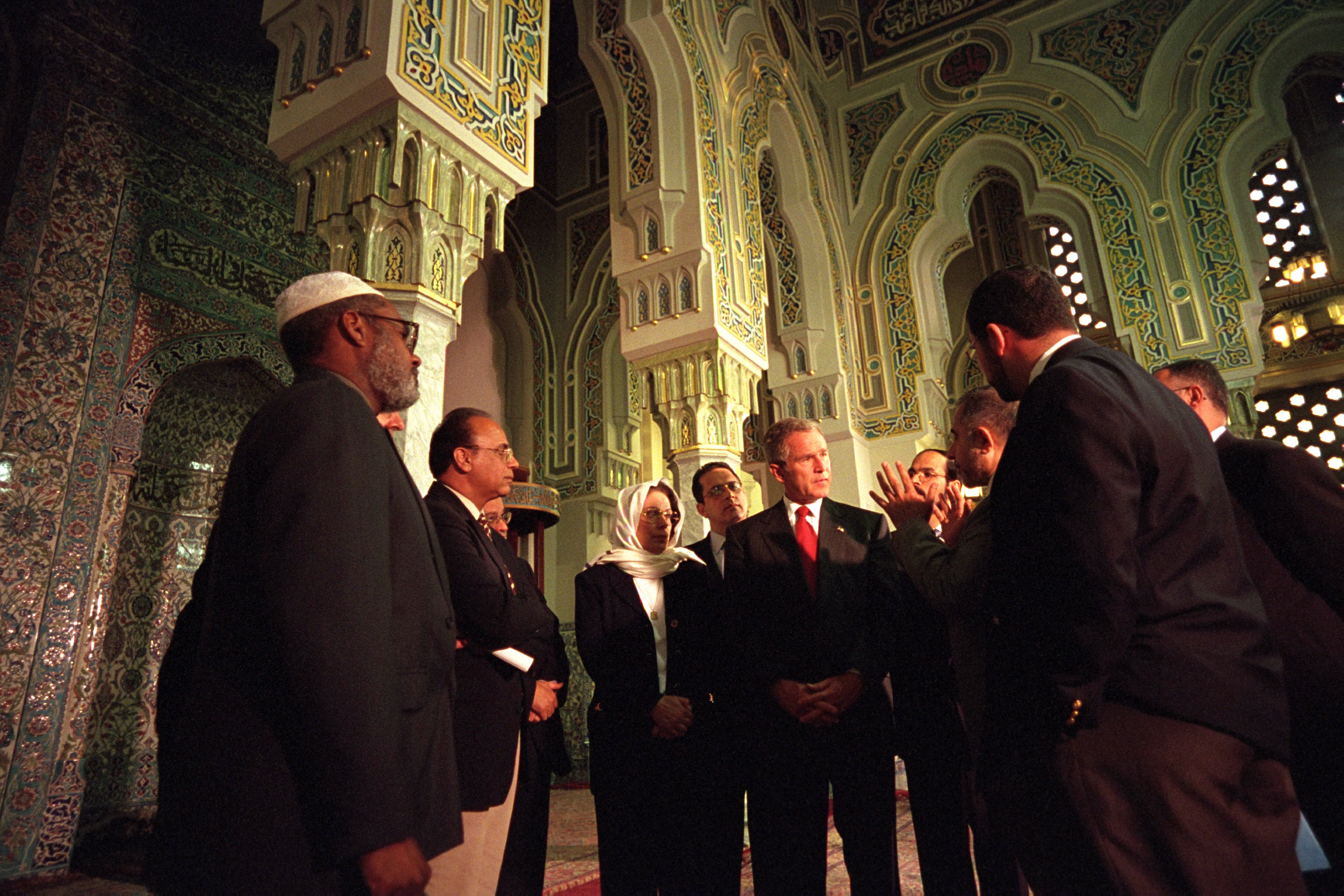
George W. Bush at the Islamic Center of Washington on September 17, 2001

Bush visited the Islamic Center of Washington, a mosque in Washington, D.C., on September 17, 2001. He met with Muslim community leaders and there delivered a speech, variously called "Remarks at the Islamic Center of Washington" and "Islam Is Peace". In the speech, Bush drew a line of distinction between Muslims and al-Qaeda, saying that al-Qaeda had perverted Islam, as the "face of terror is not the true faith of Islam", and "Islam is peace". He affirmed that Muslims, both in the United States and elsewhere, "were just appalled" by the September 11 attacks because "acts of violence against innocents violate the fundamental tenets of the Islamic faith" and that al-Qaeda "represent[ed] evil and war", not Islam. Bush then quoted a passage from the Quran stating that "[i]n the long run, evil in the extreme will be the end of those who do evil", invoking a nondenominational expression of American civil religion. In drawing this distinction between a peaceful Islam and violent terrorism, Bush characterized the United States as being an ally to the majority of the Muslim world against what he depicted as the evils of terrorism and a false Islam.

America counts millions of Muslims amongst our citizens, and Muslims make an incredibly valuable contribution to our country. Muslims are doctors, lawyers, law professors, members of the military, entrepreneurs, shopkeepers, moms and dads. And they need to be treated with respect.

— George W. Bush, Remarks at the Islamic Center of Washington, September 17, 2001

In the speech, Bush praised American Muslims, noting that there were millions of Muslim citizens of the United States who he said "make an incredibly valuable contribution to our country" in their professional and family lives. Intending to head off Islamophobic prejudice, he added that he was aware that some American Muslims, in the wake of the September 11 attacks, were "afraid they'll be intimidated" if they tried to go about their "ordinary daily routines". Bush condemned Islamophobia in the United States, saying that people who would "take out their anger" about the September 11 attacks against Muslim individuals "represent the worst of humankind, and they should be ashamed of that kind of behavior". Bringing up hijab-wearing Muslim women in particular, Bush insisted they should not have to feel afraid to go outside for fear of harassment because that was "not the America I know". To end the speech, Bush personally identified with American Muslims, saying "[t]hey love America just as much as I do".

== Reception ==
Compared to the days immediately preceding Bush's speech, there were fewer hate crimes against Muslims in the United States in the days after it. The Pew Research Center reported that in November 2001, 59% of Americans, relatively evenly distributed among both Republicans and Democrats, reported viewing Islam favorably, an increase in positive disposition compared to 45% that March; this shared outlook did not last, however, and over subsequent years views of Islam diverged along partisan lines as Republicans increasingly associated Islam with violence. To the consternation of some particularly conservative Christians—such as apologist Dave Hunt, who criticized Bush for characterizing Islam as peaceful—the Bush administration continued to reiterate that the war on terror was not against Islam writ large. Bush's remarks at the Islamic Center of Washington became the first of several speeches he went on to deliver as president to Muslim American audiences.

Rosemarie Skaine, a sociologist, credited Bush with helping reduce prejudice against Arab Americans and Muslim Americans through the example he set in his September 17 speech, among other addresses. Barack Obama, a Democrat who succeeded Bush as president, recalled feeling "very proud" of Bush for being "adamant and clear about the fact that this is not a war on Islam". Sociologist Louise Cainkar considered the remarks at the Islamic Center "a positive speech" but criticized Bush for undermining this effort in other addresses he delivered that played into stereotypes that Muslims opposed freedom, like his September 20 speech to a joint session of Congress delivered only days later. Salon contributor Aymann Ismail called Bush's September 17 remarks and his other speeches about Islam "lip service" because his actual policies were significantly negative for American Muslims, but he further argued that Bush's remarks at least demonstrated that his administration "felt responsible for how their words affected" American Muslims, which Ismail considered starkly different from the first presidency of Donald Trump.

== See also ==
- Peace in Islamic philosophy

== Sources ==
- al-Rahim, Ahmed H. (2016). "Islam and the White House: American Presidential Discourse on Establishing Official Islam, 1993–2013". Middle East Journal of Culture and Communication. 9 (1): 87–122. doi:10.1163/18739865-00901008. ISSN 1873-9857.
- Beauchamp, Zack (September 22, 2015). "Today's GOP Should Take Lessons on Islam from George W. Bush". Vox.
- Bostdorff, Denise M. (2003). "George W. Bush's Post-September 11 Rhetoric of Covenant Renewal: Upholding the Faith of the Greatest Generation". Quarterly Journal of Speech. 89 (3): 293–319. doi:10.1080/0033563032000160963.
- Cainkar, Louise (2021). "Dangerous Women / Women in Danger: Gendered Impacts of Hate and Repression, 9/11 and Beyond". In Suleiman, Michael W.; Joseph, Suad; Cainkar, Louise (eds.). Arab American Women: Representation and Refusal. Critical Arab American Studies. Syracuse University Press. pp. 432–461. doi:10.2307/j.ctv16x2bqm.23. ISBN 9780815636847. JSTOR j.ctv16x2bqm.23.
- Ching, Bruce (2020). "Echoes of 9/11: Rhetorical Analysis of Presidential Statements in the 'War on Terror'". Seton Hall Law Review. 51: 431–459.
- Duignan, Brian (November 22, 2024). "George W. Bush". Encyclopædia Britannica.
- Etzioni, Amitai (2018). Happiness Is the Wrong Metric: A Liberal Communitarian Response to Populism. Library of Public Policy and Public Administration. Vol. 11. Springer. doi:10.1007/978-3-319-69623-2. ISBN 978-3-319-69622-5.
- Hartig, Hannah; Doherty, Carroll (September 2, 2021). "Two Decades Later, the Enduring Legacy of 9/11". Pew Research Center.
- Ismail, Aymann (September 11, 2020). "Bush's Empty Words on Post-9/11 Tolerance Were Good, Actually". Salon.
- Kidd, Thomas S. (2009). American Christians and Islam: Evangelical Culture and Muslims from the Colonial Period to the Age of Terrorism. Princeton University Press. ISBN 978-0-691-13349-2.
- Lederman, Josh (December 25, 2015). "On Muslims, Democrats Find an Unlikely Ally: George W. Bush". PBS NewsHour.
- Lee, Michael J. (2017). "Us, Them, and the War on Terror: Reassessing George W. Bush's Rhetorical Legacy". Communication and Critical/Cultural Studies. 14 (1): 3–30. doi:10.1080/14791420.2016.1257817.
- Patel, Faiza; Levinson-Waldman, Rachel (April 19, 2017). "The Islamophobic Administration". Brennan Center for Justice.
- Purcell, Richard (July 2003). "The New State of Peace After 11 September 2001". Critical Quarterly. 45 (1–2): 132–147. doi:10.1111/1467-8705.00481.
- Samari, Goleen (November 2016). "Islamophobia and Public Health in the United States". American Journal of Public Health. 106 (11): 1920–1925. doi:10.2105/AJPH.2016.303374. PMC 5055770. PMID 27631738.
- Skaine, Rosemarie (June 2002). "Neither Afghan nor Islam". Ethnicities. 2 (2): 142–144. JSTOR 23890517.
- Stewart, Dona J. (July 2005). "The Greater Middle East and Reform in the Bush Administration's Ideological Imagination". Geographical Review. 95 (3): 400–424. Bibcode:2005GeoRv..95..400S. doi:10.1111/j.1931-0846.2005.tb00373.x.
