= Fourpeaked Mountain =

Active volcano in Alaska, U.S.

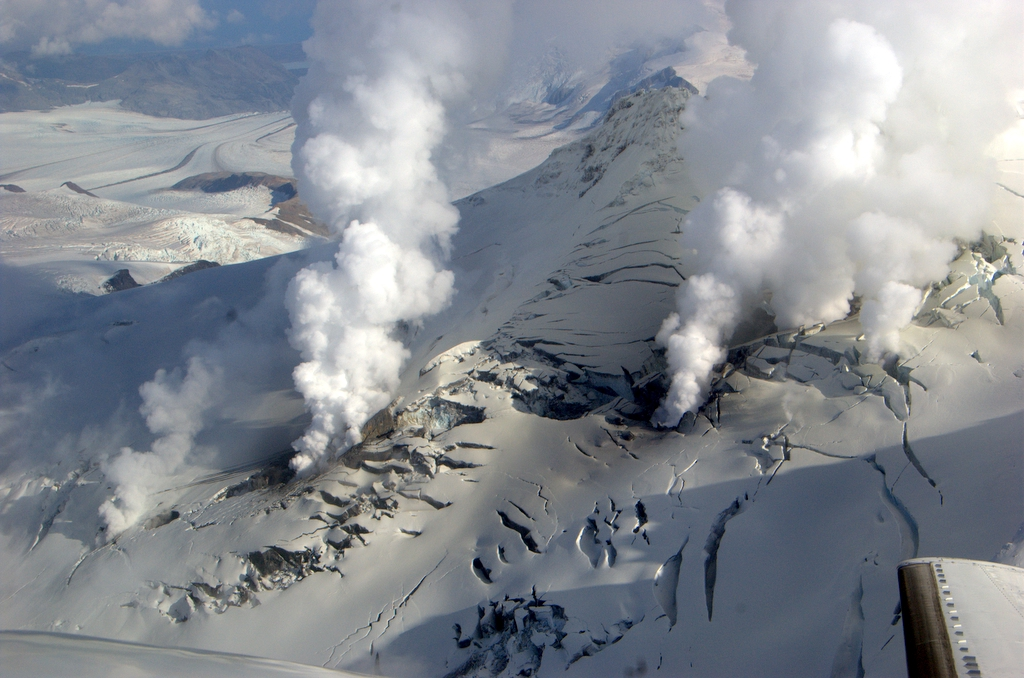
- Fumaroles escape from Fourpeaked Mountain through a fissure in Fourpeaked Glacier on September 24, 2006.

Highest point
- Elevation: 6,903 ft (2,104 m)
- Coordinates: 58°46′N 153°40′W

Geography
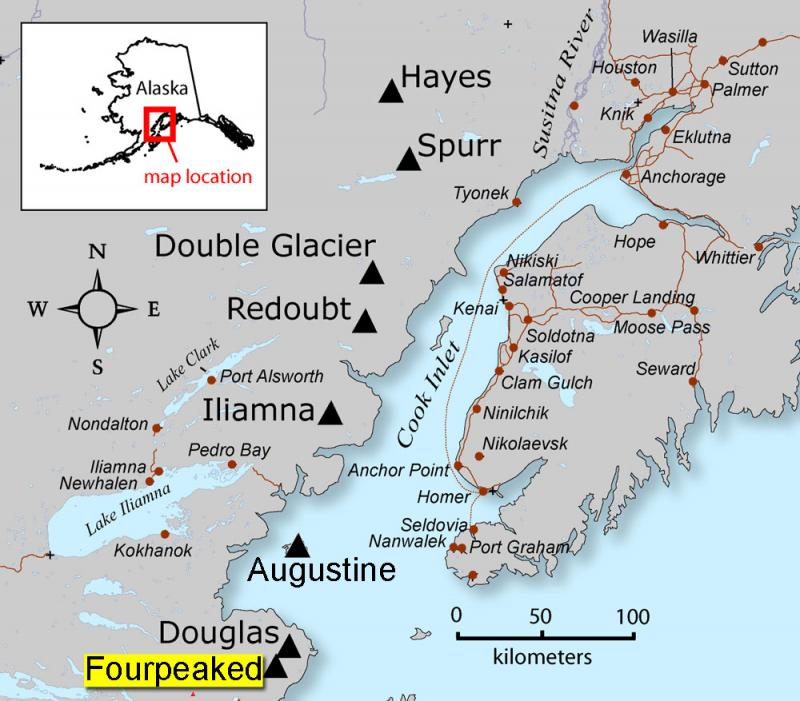
- AVO map showing the location of Fourpeaked Mountain
- Interactive map of Fourpeaked Mountain
- Location: Kenai Peninsula Borough, Alaska, U.S.
- Parent range: Aleutian Range
- Topo map: USGS Afognak

Geology
- Formed by: Subduction zone volcanism
- Rock age: > 10,000 years
- Mountain type: Stratovolcano
- Volcanic arc: Aleutian Arc
- Last eruption: September 2006 – June 2007

Fourpeaked Mountain, also known as Fourpeaked Volcano, is an active stratovolcano located in the U.S. state of Alaska within Katmai National Park and Preserve. The volcano is nearly completely covered by Fourpeaked Glacier.

== History ==
Before the eruption began on September 17, 2006, Fourpeaked Mountain had been dormant for over 10,000 years.

=== September 17, 2006 ===
Pilots and other civilians reported two distinct and very large steam plumes coming from Fourpeaked Mountain. They were seen as far away as Homer, Alaska located northeast of Fourpeaked across Cook Inlet. Scientists on subsequent flights by USGS/AVO discovered that volcanic gases were being vented "vigorously" near the summit. Air sampling confirmed these findings. The Alaska Volcano Observatory officially classified this event as an explosive eruption.

=== September 20, 2006 ===
The Alaska Volcano Observatory upgraded Fourpeaked Mountain from the classification "not assigned" to Level of Concern Color Code Yellow on September 20, 2006. This color-coded system was later renamed the Aviation Alert Level, but with the same color-coding system. At that time they began installing seismic monitoring equipment on the mountain and using fixed-wing aircraft as well as helicopters to monitor the volcano.

=== September 25, 2006 AVO eruption warning ===
On September 25, 2006, the AVO warned that Fourpeaked would likely erupt again, and released the following information as part of a special information release:

Based on all currently available evidence, AVO believes that an eruption from Fourpeaked in the next days to weeks is possible. Given below are some possible future scenarios for the current unrest at Fourpeaked, listed in order, with the most likely scenario listed first:

1. A small to moderate eruption will occur, which may produce ash plumes exceeding 10 km (33,000 ft) above sea level. Lava flows may also occur.
2. No eruption occurs. Unrest gradually subsides to background levels.
3. A large eruption will occur, which would produce ash plumes exceeding 10 km (33,000 ft) above sea level, and possible widespread ash fall.

=== October 3, 2006 ===
Fourpeaked Mountain during eruption, September 17, 2006

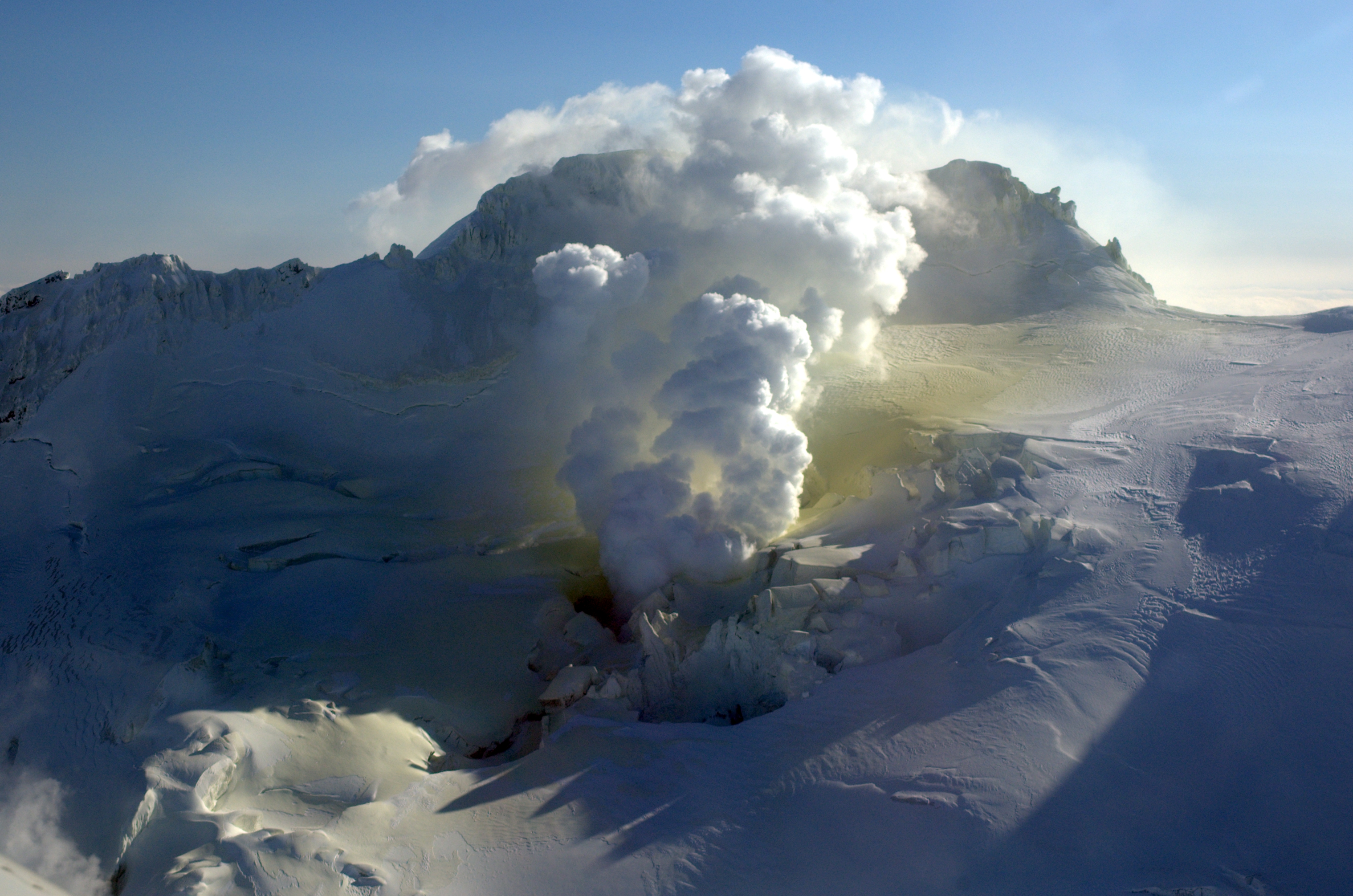
Fourpeaked Mountain with active fumaroles and sulfur deposits on February 22, 2007

The Alaska Volcano Observatory completed installation of another seismometer near Fourpeaked. Almost immediately they detected an earthquake swarm of lower magnitude quakes. This behavior continued intermittently through the spring of 2007. Fourpeaked also continued to vent volcanic gases at the same rate as revealed in earlier air sampling.

=== February 2007 ===
In February, 2007 Fourpeaked began showing a relatively small but noticeable increase in activity. The Alaska Volcano Observatory reported February 8–9 that: "Three small explosive events were recorded by seismic and acoustic instruments Thursday and Friday (February 08–09) beginning at 10:36 AM AKST (1936 UTC) February 08. A possible large steam plume was observed in several partly cloudy satellite views Thursday afternoon." On February 18, the AVO reported a swarm of 13 small earthquakes under Fourpeaked, with the largest measuring 1.8 on the Richter magnitude scale. On February 23, the AVO conducted a gas flight and detected the continued emission of sulfur dioxide (SO_{2}).

=== March 2007 ===
The Alaska Volcano Observatory began reporting in its Daily Update on Fourpeaked Mountain that "several small explosion signals" were detected overnight, apparently continuing the series of small explosions which began on February 8. These "small explosions" continued until June, when Fourpeaked's classification was lowered to Green.

== See also ==
- List of volcanoes in the United States
