= Rosemarie Skaine =

American sociologist and author

Rosemarie Keller Skaine (born Grand Island, Nebraska) is an American author and sociologist. She is known for her nonfiction works, especially writings related to other cultures. She is currently an active freelance writer.

In 2015, ABC-CLIO/Praeger Security International, published Skaine's latest book, Sexual Assault in the U.S. Military: The Battle within America's Armed Forces. She has also authored national and international articles.

Skaine earned her M.A. in sociology at the University of Northern Iowa in 1977.

== Honors ==
- Keynote speech "Suicide Warfare and Violence Against Women," interactive dialogue panel, "Dying to Kill: The Allure of Female Suicide Bombers," United Nations Commission on the Status of Women 57: Elimination and Prevention of all Forms of Violence against Women and Girls, March 8, 2013, United Nations Plaza, N.Y.
- Who’s Who of American Women 2008 to present, Who’s Who in the World 2007 to present, Who’s Who in America 2008 to present.
- Hall of Honor Inductee, Grand Island Senor High (NE), 2009.
- Gustavus Myers Center Award for the Study of Human Rights in North America. 1997 for outstanding work on intolerance in North America in Rosemarie Skaine's book, Power and Gender: Issues in Sexual Dominance and Harassment, McFarland & Co., Inc., Publishers, 1996.
- Educational Communications Inc.'s, Who's Who Among America's Teachers: the Best Teachers in America Selected by the Best Students, 6th ed., vol. 3, 2000
- Honorary societies: Pi Kappa Delta, Alpha Kappa Delta, Quill and Scroll, and National Forensic League.

== Select publications ==
=== Books ===
- Sexual Assault in the U.S. Military: The Battle within America's Armed Forces. (Praeger Security International (December 2015) ISBN 1440833788
- Abuse: An Encyclopedia of Causes, Consequences, and Treatments. ABC-CLIO/Greenwood (April 2015)ISBN 978-1610695145
- Suicide Warfare: Culture, the Military, and the Individual as a Weapon. ABC-CLIO/Praeger Security International (January 2013) ISBN 9780313398643
- Women in Combat: A Reference Handbook. Contemporary World Issues, Series, ABC-CLIO/Greenwood (January 2011) ISBN 978-1-59884-459-7
- Women of Afghanistan in the Post-Taliban Era. Jefferson, NC: McFarland (2008) ISBN 978-0-7864-3792-4
- Women Political Leaders in Africa. Jefferson, NC: McFarland (2008) ISBN 0-7864-3299-3
- Female Suicide Bombers. McFarland (2006) ISBN 0-7864-2615-2
- Female Genital Mutilation: Legal, Cultural and Medical Issues. Jefferson, NC: McFarland (2005) ISBN 0-7864-2167-3
- The Cuban Family: Custom and Change in an Era of Hardship. Jefferson, NC: McFarland (2004) ISBN 0-7864-1677-7
- Paternity and American Law. Jefferson, NC: McFarland (2003) ISBN 0-7864-1411-1
- The Women of Afghanistan Under the Taliban. McFarland (2002) ISBN 0-7864-1090-6
- Women College Basketball Coaches. Jefferson, NC: McFarland (2001) ISBN 0-7864-0920-7
- A Man of the Twentieth Century: Recollections of Warren V. Keller, A Nebraskan As told to Rosemarie Keller Skaine and James C. Skaine. Cedar Falls, IA: Author's Castle Publishing (1999) ISBN 0-9672240-0-4
- Women at War: Gender Issues of Americans in Combat. Jefferson, NC: McFarland (1999) ISBN 0-7864-0570-8
- Power and Gender: Issues in Sexual Dominance and Harassment. Jefferson, NC: McFarland (1996) ISBN 0-7864-0208-3
- Questions and Answers about Sexual Harassment. Cedar Falls, IA: Affirmative Action, University of Northern Iowa, April 1980, revised editions, June 1982 and January 1990.

=== Articles and book chapters ===
- "Women Political Leaders in Africa." In Gender and Women's Leadership: A Reference Handbook, edited by Karen O'Connor, Sage, 2010, p. 345. ISBN 978-1-4129-6083-0 (hardcover).
- "Female Genital Mutilation." World Book Online Reference Center, 2008. [Place of access.] Sept. 17, 2008
- "Neither Afghan Nor Islam." "Symposium on September 11, 2001: Terrorism, Islam and the West," Ethnicities, London: Sage Publications Ltd., Volume 02, Issue 02, June 2002.
- "Terrorist Attack & Natural Disaster Preparedness: Review of Hanley J. Harding's educational book to help citizens be prepared for a possible attack, C/B/R/N: Chemical/Biological/Radiological/Nuclear Disaster Familiarization and Overview Manual, August 18, 2006 and updated June 30, 2007, Authorsden
- "Soviet-Afghan War (1979-1989)." Stanley Sandler (ed.), Ground Warfare: An International Encyclopedia, Santa Barbara, Calif.: ABC-CLIO, 2002, p. 826.
- "Warren V. Keller: A Visit to His Roots." Coauthored by Rosemarie and James Skaine, The Hottel-Keller Voice, Newsletter, March 1995, pp. 7,8.
- "Harassment is a Leadership Issue." (military op-ed), Iowa View/Essay/Comment Des Moines Register, Nov. 29, 1996, 13A.
- "Properly Trained Servicewomen Can Overcome Physical Shortcomings." James Haley (ed.), Women in the Military, San Diego, CA: Greenhaven Press, c2004.
- "Overturning Paternity." Ron Brown and Laura Morgan (eds.), 2004 Family Law Update, New York, NY: Aspen Publishers (November 2003), January 2004, 25-60.
- "Sexual Harassment." St. James Encyclopedia of Popular Culture, edited by Tom Pendergast and Sara Pendergast. 5 Vols., Farmington Hills, Michigan, St. James Press, 1999.
- "Jacqueline Lee Bouvier Kennedy Onassis." St. James Encyclopedia of Popular Culture, edited by Tom Pendergast and Sara Pendergast. 5 Vols., Farmington Hills, Michigan, St. James Press, 1999.
- "Dear John" Letter. Anna Holmes (ed.), Hell Hath No Fury: Women's Letters from the End of the Affair, New York, N.Y.: Carroll & Graf Publishers, 2002, 176-177.
- "Keeping Music Alive." Iowan Magazine (ISSN 0021-0722)
- "Doug Koempel, Iowa Performing Artist." The Iowan Magazine, Des Moines, IA: The Iowan, Inc., July–August 1999.
- "Lessons in Love and Life." Personal Romance, Fort Lee, NJ: Dynasty Media Corp., January 1985.
- "Sexual Harassment in the Workplace." Coauthored Donald E. Maypole and Rosemarie Skaine, Social Work, Journal of the National Association of Social Workers, vol. 28, no. 5, September–October 1983.
- "Sexual Harassment of Blue Collar Workers." Coauthored Donald E. Maypole and Rosemarie Skaine, Journal of Sociology and Social Welfare, vol. IX, no. 4, December 1982.
- "Organizational Structure, Supervision and Job Satisfaction: A Study of their Interrelationships in a Rural Setting." Coauthored Rosemarie Skaine and Satish Sharma, Osmania Journal of Sociology, January 1979, vol., no. 1. An earlier version appeared in Annual Proceedings of the Southern Association of Agricultural Scientists, 1979, New Orleans, Louisiana.
- "Issues in Rural-Urban Work Settings: Gender and Sexual Harassment." Coauthored Rosemarie Skaine and Donald E. Maypole, Annual Proceedings of the Southern Association of Agricultural Scientists, Atlanta, Georgia, 1981.
