= Kimball Young =

American sociologist (1893–1972)

Kimball Young (October 26, 1893 – September 1, 1972) was the president of the American Sociological Association in 1945.

Young was the grandson of Brigham Young. He was born in Provo, Utah, and graduated from Brigham Young University (BYU) in 1915. However, Kimball Young himself was not a believer in the Latter-day Saint faith, and spoke condescendingly of those who were. He then taught high school for a year in Arizona before going to study at the University of Chicago for sociology. His decision to study at Chicago was largely due to advice from BYU professor William J. Snow. After studying there, he went to study at Stanford University, where he earned a Ph.D. in psychology in 1921.

In his 1927 Source Book for Social Psychology, Young coined the term 'ambivert' to describe a person exhibiting features of both an extrovert and an introvert. He is credited with the origin of the word.

Young began his teaching career as a professor at the University of Oregon. Later, he was a member of the faculty of Clark University, then went back to Oregon for four years, and then joined the faculty of the University of Wisconsin–Madison. In 1940, he became the chair of sociology at Queens College. In 1947 he took up the same position at Northwestern University.
