= Steffen Algreen =

Danish footballer

Personal information
- Full name: Steffen R. Algreen
- Date of birth: 17 September 1979 (age 47)
- Place of birth: Denmark
- Height: 1.90 m (6 ft 3 in)
- Position: Defender

Team information
- Current team: FC Fyn

Youth career
- 1993–1997: Vejle Boldklub

Senior career*
Years	Team	Apps	(Gls)
1997–1998	Sole IF	?	(?)
1998–2002	AC Horsens	?	(?)
2002–2003	FC Hedensted	?	(?)
2003–2008	AC Horsens	26	(1)
2008	FC Fyn	55	(7)
- * Club domestic league appearances and goals

Steffen R. Algreen (born 17 September 1979) is a Danish former professional footballer who played as a defender.

== Honours ==
- Danish 1st Division:
  - Runner-up: 2004-05 (with Horsens)
