= Luther L. Bernard =

American psychologist and sociologist

Luther Lee Bernard (October 29, 1881 – January 23, 1951, State College, Pennsylvania) was an American sociologist and psychologist. He was the 22nd President of the American Sociological Association (for the year 1932). He has been described as "among the best known U.S. sociologist in the country... between the 1920 and the 1940."

Bernard studied at the University of Missouri and at the University of Chicago, where he received his Ph.D. received his doctorate. He then taught sociology and social psychology at various North American universities and was finally a professor of sociology at Pennsylvania State University.

According to Lewis Coser, Bernard's social psychological theory can be described as "modified behaviorism". He adopted basic principles of behaviorism, but emphasized the influence of the environment on character formation. Thanks to him, American social psychology turned away from an exclusively biological orientation.

== Luther Bernard's "Onion Skins" ==
In a project known as Luther Bernard’s "Onion Skins," Bernard sent hundreds of questionnaires to social scientists throughout the country which asked for both the origins and current details on each social science department, as well as for professional autobiographies from the scholars to whom he wrote. The majority of the Onion Skins are housed in the Special Collections Library at Pennsylvania State University. This project helped make Bernard one of the most well-connected sociologists of his time. According to sociologist Anthony Albanese, the responses in the Onion Skins reveal that the majority of sociologists at this time believed that social amelioration and the advancement of knowledge depended upon the realization of the positivist stage.

== Works ==
- Instincts (1924)
- An Introduction to Social Psychology (1926)
- The Development of Methods in Sociology (1928)
- Sociology and the Study of International Relations (1934)
- Social Control (1939)
- War at its Causes (1944)
- Origins of American Sociology (1943 - with Jessie Bernard).
