= Joseph De Piro =

Maltese Roman Catholic priest and missionary

The Reverend Monsignor Servant of God Joseph De Piro MSSP
- Founder of the Missionary Society of St Paul
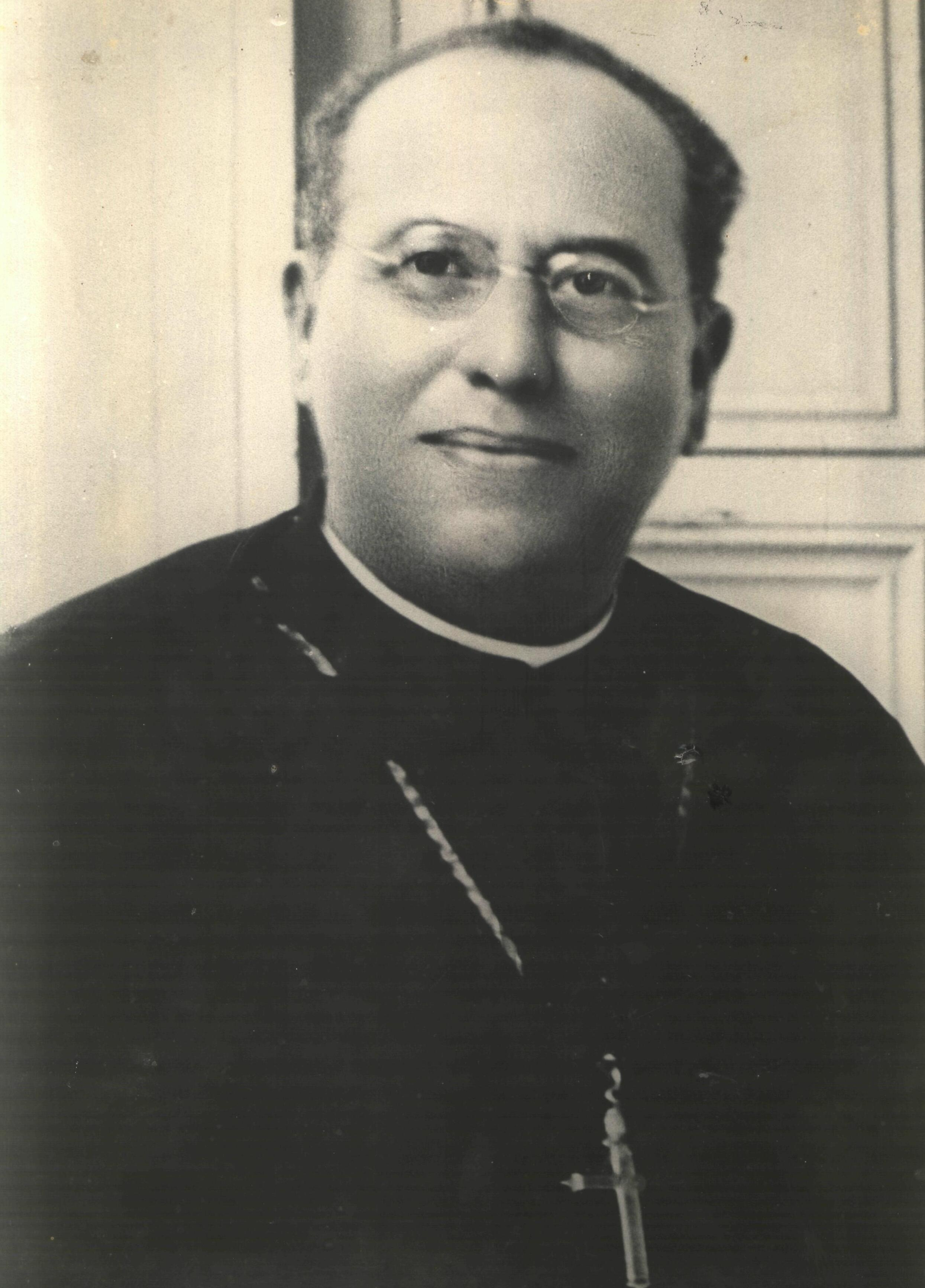
- Mgr. Joseph De Piro
- Church: Roman Catholic

Orders
- Ordination: 1902

Personal details
- Born: November 2, 1877 Mdina, Malta
- Died: September 17, 1933 (aged 55) Hamrun, Malta

Giuseppe De Piro or Joseph De Piro, (2 November 1877 – 17 September 1933) was a Roman Catholic priest and missionary. He founded the Missionary Society of St Paul (MSSP) in June 1910 with a charism to form missionaries following the example of St Paul. A Servant of God, he is a candidate for beatification.

== Life ==
De Piro was born in Mdina, Malta on 2 November 1877. He was a student at the University of Malta when he decided to switch from the study of law to preparing for the priesthood.

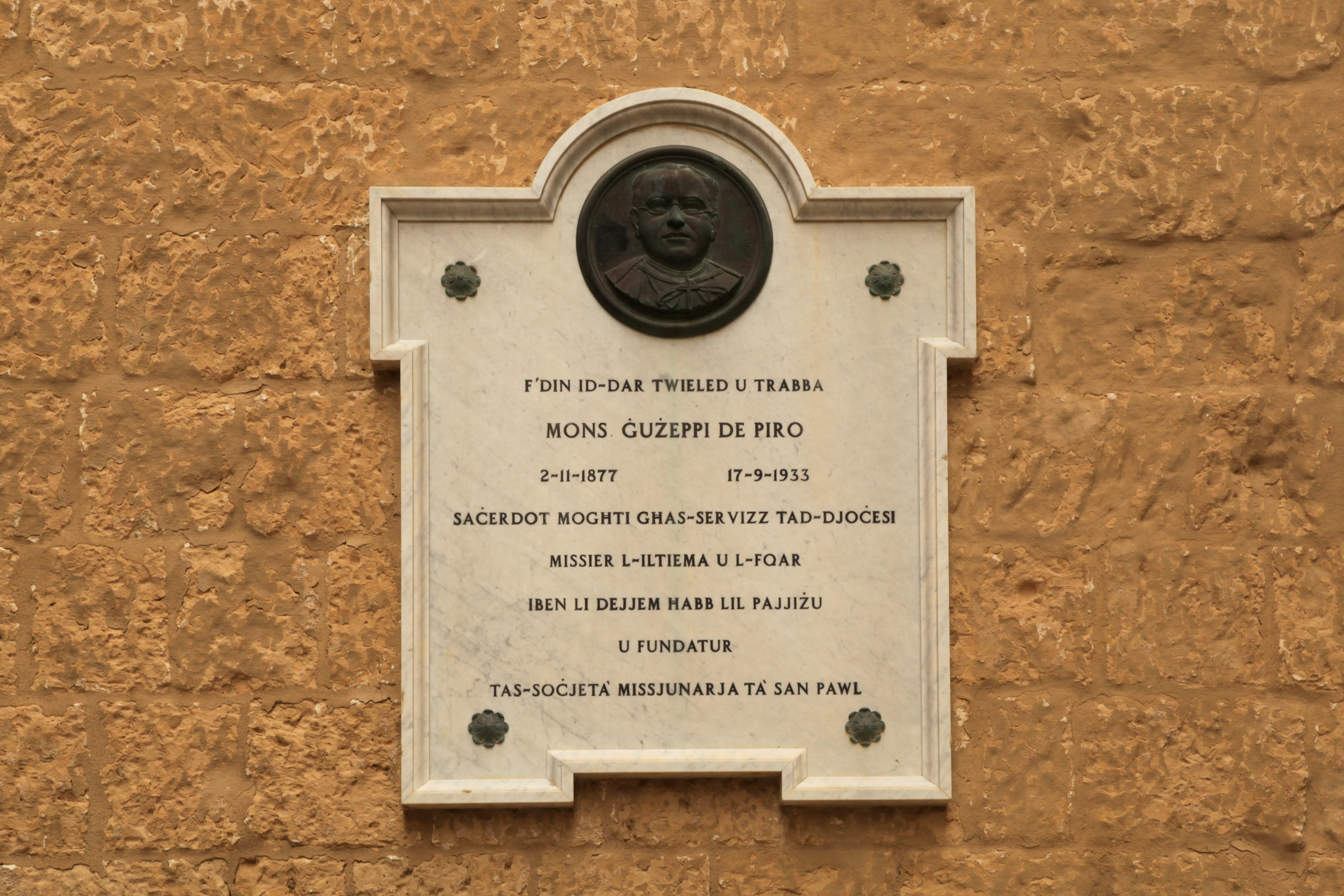
Plaque commemorating Giuseppe De Piro in Mdina

De Piro was ordained to the priesthood in 1902 in Rome. Although he was involved in various ministries within the church, his main concern was the missions and work amongst the poor. He continued to work the establishment of a society of priests and brothers committed to the spreading of the gospel. From accepting the first two members in 1910 he waited eleven years for the official approval by the local bishop and seventeen years before Brother Joseph Caruana became the first Paulist missionary, and was sent to Ethiopia, where he remained until his death in 1975 at the age of 83.

De Piro started off with a small community in Mdina, and died at the age of 55 in 1933 when the society was in its very initial stages. Over the years, members joined and the mission started with the Maltese emigrants in Australia and also in the US and Canada.

The first foundation in Australia in 1948 had been in Sydney three years earlier than the foundation in Melbourne. Both cities had a huge concentration of Maltese people, 23,000 in Melbourne alone.

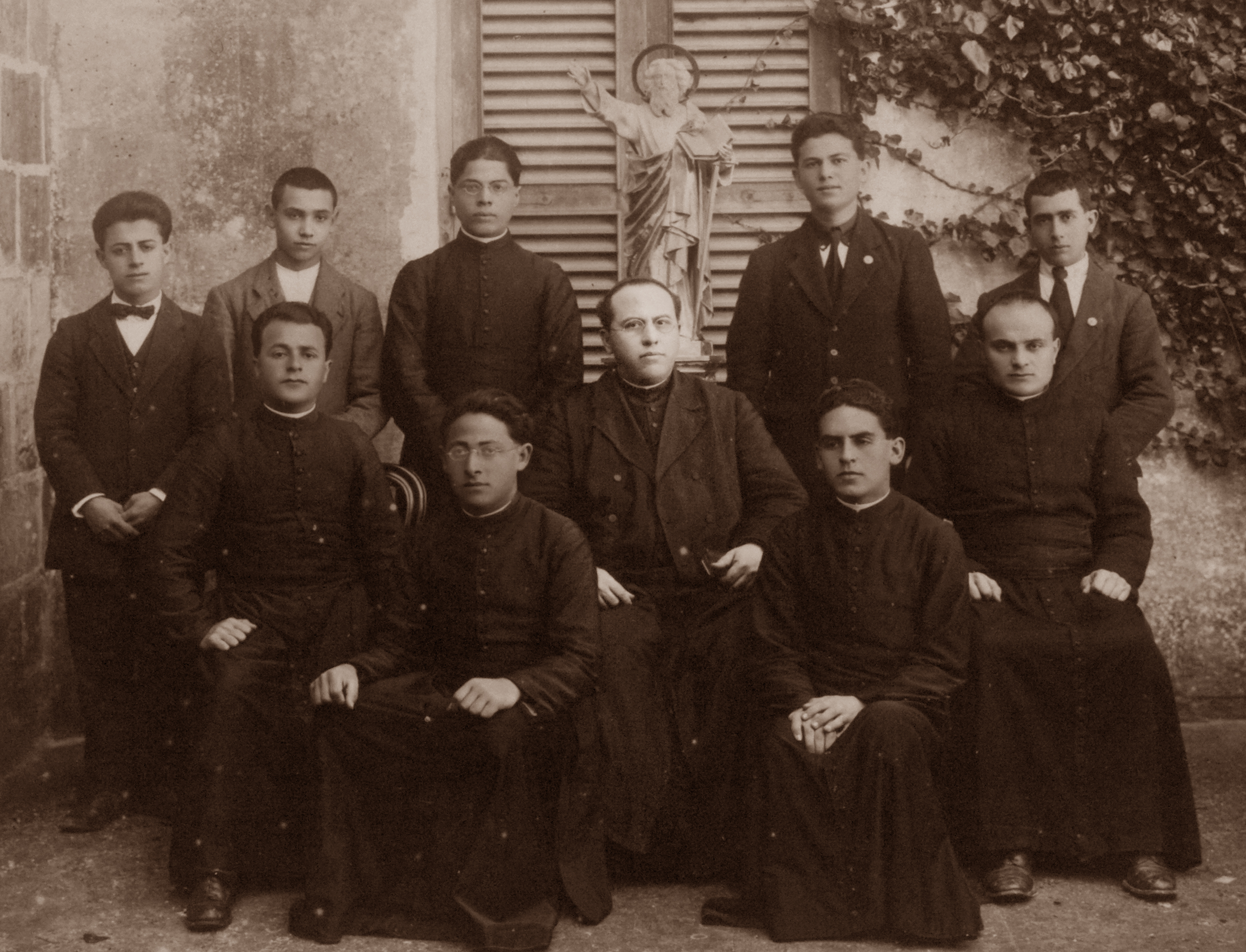
Mgr Joseph De Piro with some of the first MSSP members

The first group of three missionaries went to work in Peru in 1968. Other missions in Pakistan and the Philippines followed. The society's general administration is in Rome. They are established in Australia, mainly in Melbourne and Sydney, in Peru in Arequipa and Lima, in Pakistan in Lahore and, Manila and in Bataan in the Philippines. The latest mission to be opened is the one in Cuba, in 2017.
