= Missionary Society of St Paul (Malta) =

Roman Catholic missionary congregation

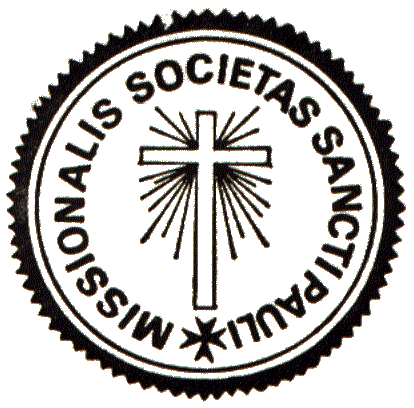
- Abbreviation: M.S.S.P.
- Formation: 30 June 1910
- Founder: Joseph De Piro
- Founded at: Malta
- Type: Catholic religious order
- Superior General: Fr. Martin Galea mssp
- Website: missionarysocietyofstpaul.org

The Missionary Society of St Paul (Maltese: Soċjeta' Missjunarja ta' San Pawl, MSSP) is a Roman Catholic missionary congregation of priests and brothers, founded in Malta in 1910 by Mgr. Joseph De Piro. According to its Constitutions, "the purpose of the Society is the evangelisation and the implanting of the Church in missionary lands known as mission Ad Gentes. Consequently its apostolic endeavours in those countries not strictly considered missionary must be orientated towards promoting and creating an awareness of missionary activity."

== Foundation ==
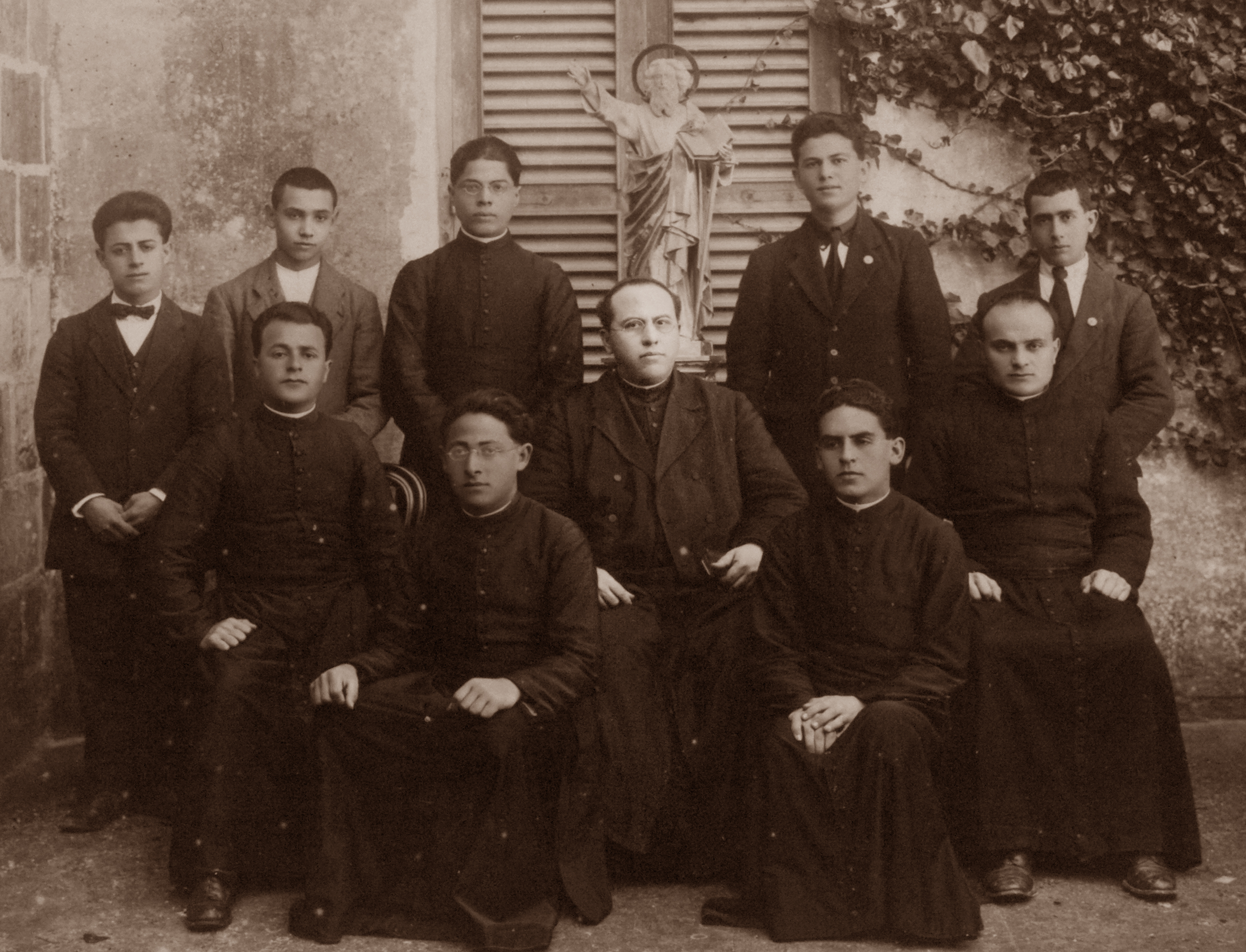
Mgr Joseph De Piro (centre) with the first members. The first two members, Br Joseph Caruana and Br John Vella are to his left and to his right respectively. Michael Callus, who was to become the first Superior General is sitting to the left, in front of the Founder

Founding a missionary congregation was the desire of Joseph De Piro which he had from a young age. He tried to enlist the help of others in realizing it and eventually settled with the support of a few mentors. On 30 June 1910, De Piro accepted the first two members, Joseph Caruana and John Vella. Eventually Vella left the Society after being ordained a priest. Caruana, who remained a lay brother, became, in 1927, its first missionary serving for 48 years in Ethiopia until his death.

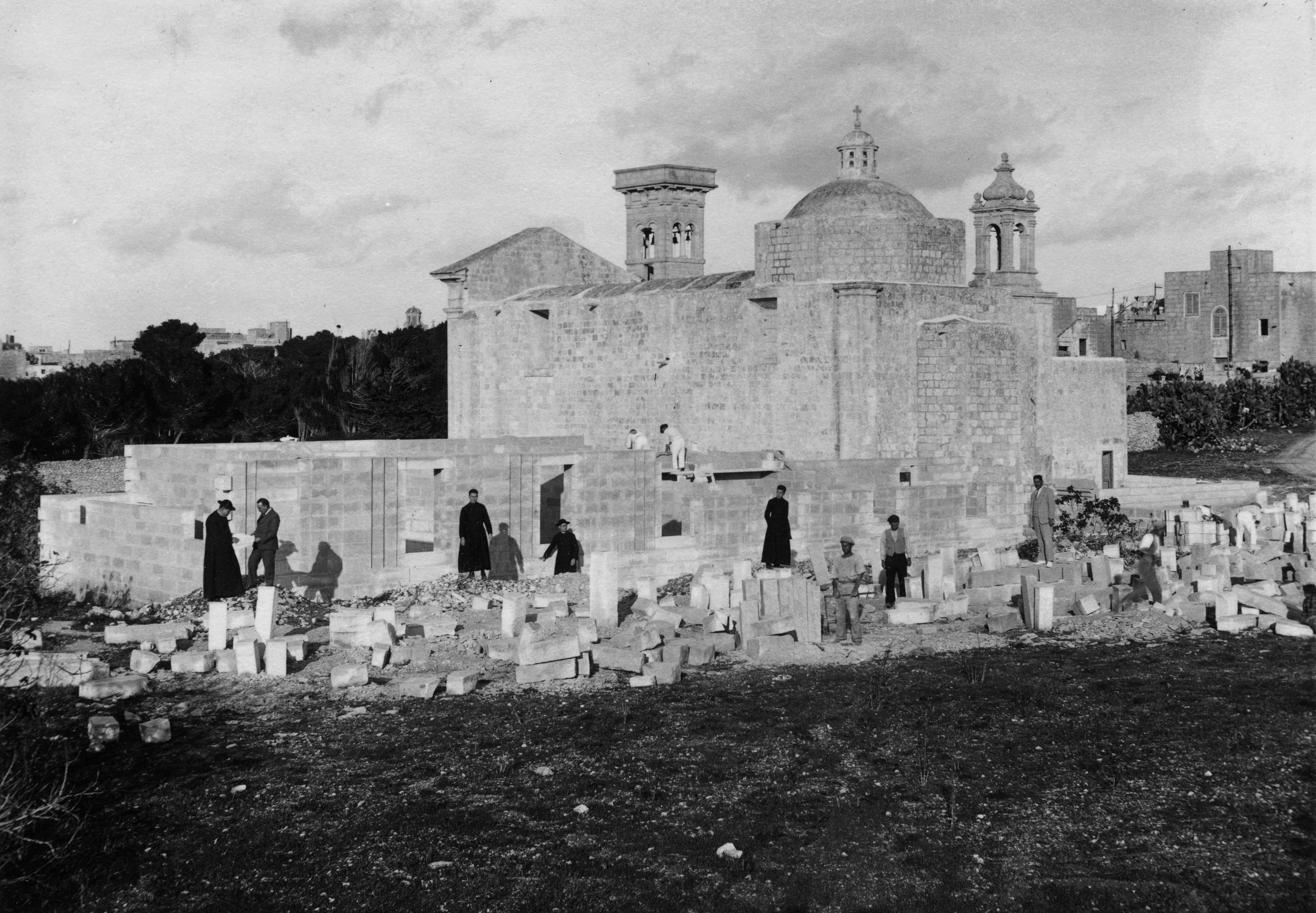
The MSSP Motherhouse, St Agatha, Rabat, Malta, at its early stages

The Society got its first Diocesan approval on 14 November 1921. The founder also managed to secure a Motherhouse for the young congregation before he died suddenly on 17 September 1933, at the relatively young age of 55. His fledgling Society was still too weak to survive on its own. So, for a time, superiors external to congregation were assigned to guide it, until in 1948 the Society had its first Superior General from its own members, Fr Michael Callus.

== Expansion ==
Br Joseph Caruana served in a mission belonging to the Maltese Capuchins. The Society had its own first mission in 1948 when two members of the Society went to Sydney, Australia, working as Maltese chaplains. Then, in 1959, the Society was present in Ontario, Canada, and in 1973 in Detroit, U.S.A., again working among Maltese migrants.

The Society expanded towards Latin America when in 1968 it opened its first community in the province of Arequipa, Peru. Then, in 1982, when Fr Stanley Tomlin was Superior General, the Society opened its first mission in Asia when it sent two missionaries to Faisalabad, Pakistan.

It was, then, in 1999, when the Society opened another mission in Asia, this time in the Philippines. Two missionaries, one from Australia and another working in Pakistan, were sent by the then Superior General, Fr. Joseph Cremona, to establish a community in Manila. The latest mission of the MSSP is Cuba, established in 2017, when two Peruvian missionaries were sent to Santa Clara, by the present Superior General, Fr Mark Grima.

== Decretum Laudis ==
The Society was granted the decretum laudis in 1973. By this decree, the MSSP became a Pontifical Society, falling directly under the authority of the Holy See. Although still small in number, the Holy See granted this privilege to the Society in recognition of the apostolic zeal by which this congregation was embracing its mission and as an encouragement to continue to move forward.
