= List of schools in Malta =

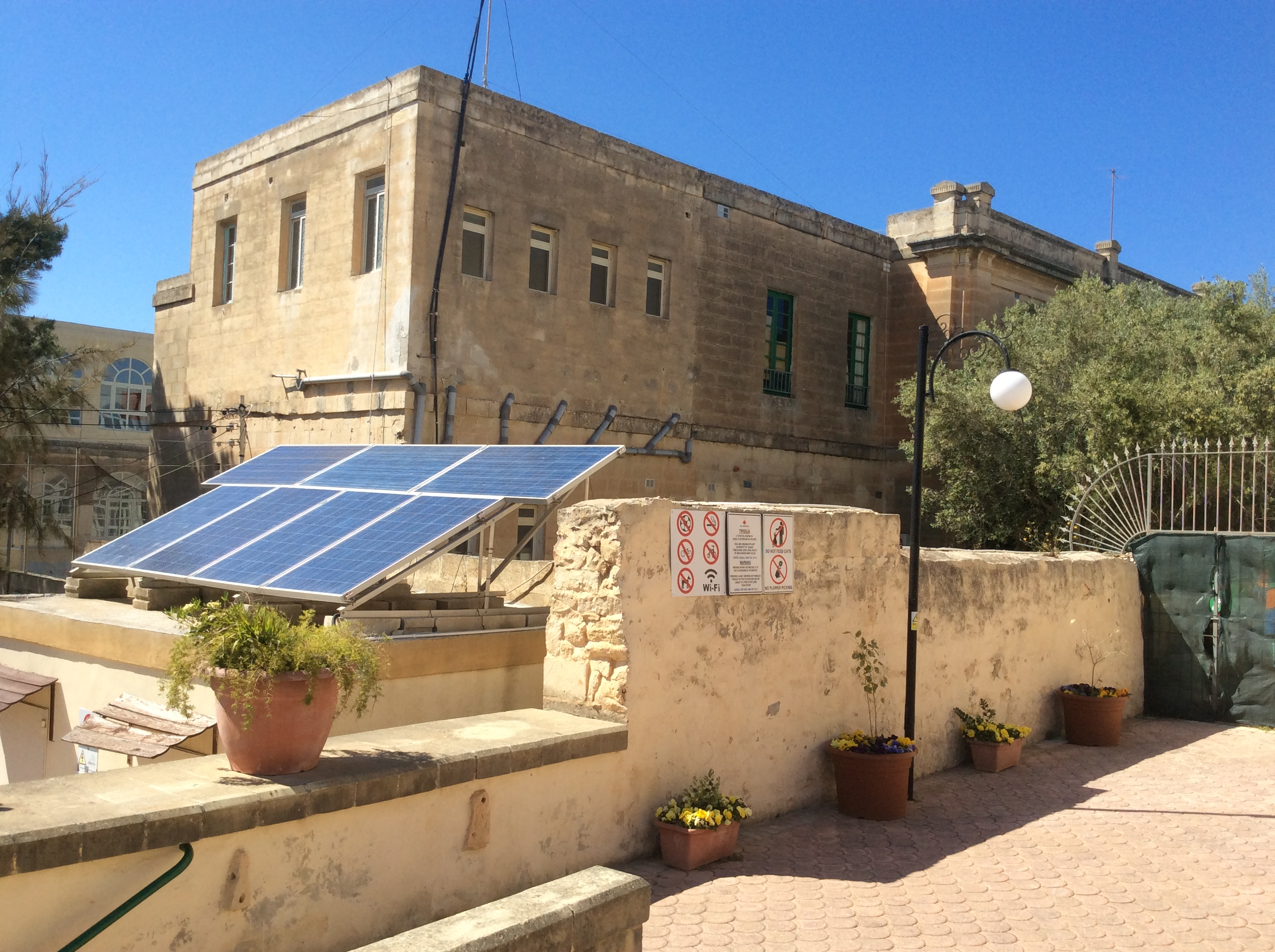
Għargħur Primary School

This article has a list of schools in Malta, that includes schools in Malta and Gozo.

== Schools in Malta ==
=== Colleges ===
- Ġ.F. Abela Junior College, Msida
- Maria Regina College (Kulleġġ Marija Reġina), Mosta
  - Catchment area: Għargħur, Mellieħa, Mosta, Naxxar, San Pawl il-Baħar
- St. Benedict College (Kulleġġ San Benedittu), Kirkop
  - Catchment area: Birżebbuġa, Għaxaq, Gudja, Kirkop, Mqabba, Qrendi, Safi, Żurrieq
- St. Clare College (Kulleġġ Santa Klara), Pembroke
  - Catchment area: Gżira, Pembroke/Swieqi, San Ġiljan, San Ġwann, Sliema
- St. Ġorġ Preca College (Kulleġġ San Ġorġ Preca), Ħamrun
  - Catchment area: Floriana, Ħamrun, Marsa, Paola, Pietà, Valletta
- St. Ignatius College (Kulleġġ Sant' Injazju), Qormi
  - Catchment area: Luqa, Qormi, Siġġiewi, Ħaż-Żebbuġ
- St. Margaret College (Kulleġġ Santa Margarita), Birgu
  - Catchment area: Birgu, Bormla, Kalkara, Senglea, Xgħajra, Żabbar
- St. Nicholas' College (Kulleġġ San Nikola), Rabat
  - Catchment area: Attard, Baħrija, Dingli, Mġarr, Mtarfa, Rabat/Mdina
- St. Theresa College (Kulleġġ Santa Tereża), Birkirkara
  - Catchment area: Birkirkara, Balzan/Iklin/Lija, Msida/Ta' Xbiex, Santa Venera
- St. Thomas More College (Kulleġġ San Tumas More), Santa Luċija
  - Catchment area: Fgura, Marsaskala, Marsaxlokk, Santa Luċija, Tarxien, Żejtun

=== Church schools ===
- The Archbishop's Seminary School - Tal-Virtù, Rabat, Malta
- Bishops Conservatory School - Victoria
- De La Salle College - Cottonera Road, Vittoriosa
- Immaculate Conception School - Tarxien Road, Tarxien
- Our Lady Immaculate School - Canon Bonnici Street, Ħamrun
- Sacred Heart College - Triq Il-Qalb Imqaddsa, Saint Julian's
- Savio College - Buskett Road, Dingli
- St Albert the Great College - Old Bakery Street, Valletta
- St Aloysius' College - Old Railway Street, Birkirkara
- St Angela Kindergartens - Lija/Msida/Rabat/Żabbar
- St Augustine College
  - Primary School - Simpson Street, Marsa
  - Secondary School - G'Mangia Hill, Guardamangia, Pietà
- St Benild's School - Carmelo Street, Sliema
- St Dorothy's Schools
  - Junior School - Triq Il-Qasira, Sliema
  - Junior/Senior School - Mdina Road, Żebbuġ
- St Elias College - St. Venera Square, Santa Venera
- St Francis School - Mnajjar Street, Birkirkara
- St Francis School - Steeple Street, Cospicua
- St Francis School - Ħriereb Street, Msida
- St Francis School - Tulipan, Santa Luċija
- St Francis Secondary School - Manwel Dimech Street, Sliema
- St Jeanne Antide Primary School - Triq Joseph Pace, Gudja
- St Joseph School - Dun Ġorġ Preca Street, Blata l-Bajda, Ħamrun
- St Joseph School - Cathedral Street, Sliema
- St Joseph Mater Bon Consili School - Mater Boni Consilii Street, Paola
- St Michael School - Cannon Rd, Santa Venera
- St Monica School - Triq L-Ewwel, Birkirkara
- St Monica School - Madre Theresa Spinelli Street, Gżira
- St Monica School - Ponosomby Street, Mosta
- St. Paul's Missionary College - Emanuele Vitale Street, Rabat, Malta
- Stella Maris College - San Bert Street, Gżira
- Theresa Nuzzo School - Ħamrun
- Theresa Nuzzo School - Balbi Street, Marsa

=== Private schools ===
- Beesmart Kindergarten - Triq il-Palazz L-Ahmar, Santa Venera
- Casa Maria Montessori - Naxxar Road, Birkirkara
- Chiswick House School - Antonio Schembri Street, Kappara
- Il-Perla Kindergarten - Guze Debono Square, Msida
- Kidstart Kindergarten - Triq Misrah il-Barrieri, Santa Venera
- Lil'Ville at the Airport Kindergarten - Triq Sant’ Anton Abbati, Mosta
- Little Einsteins Montessori System - Swatar/Mosta/Attard/Swieqi/Naxxar
- Mariam Albatool School - Dom Mintoff Road, Paola
- Mickeys Kindergarten - Danny Cremona Street, Ħamrun
- Newark Schools - Parisio Street, Sliema
- Niki's Nursery School - Windsor Terrace, Sliema
- San Andrea School - Mselliet, Mġarr
- San Anton School - Mselliet, Mġarr
- St Catherine's High School - Suffolk Road, Pembroke
- St Cecilia's Kindergarten - Napuljun Caruana Dingli Street, Tarxien
- St Edward's College - Triq Il, Cottonera
- St Martin's College - Swatar Road, Swatar
- St Michael Foundation Schools
  - Kindergarten/Junior School - Triq Alamein, Pembroke
  - Senior School - Triq Tal-Balal, San Gwann
- St Patrick's Salesian School - St John Bosco Street, Sliema
- St Paula Early Education Centre - Triq L-Imdina, Żebbuġ
- Thi Lakin School - Zebbug Road, Attard

=== International schools ===
- 24 December Libyan School - Ta'Giorni, Saint Julian's
- French Bilingual International School of Malta - Triq Giorgio Mitrovich, Pembroke
- Haileybury Malta - RNH Mtarfa/Tarxien
- International Boarding School Malta Crown - Mensija Street, Saint Julian's
- Leptis International School - Ta'Giorni, Saint Julian's
- QSI International School of Malta - Triq Durumblat, Mosta
- Verdala International School - Pembroke

=== Special-education schools ===
- Frate Jacoba Educational Institute - Triq Wied iż-Żiju, Marsaskala
- LinC Program - Inspire Foundation - Bulebel, Żejtun

=== Technical and trade schools ===
- Giovanni Curmi Higher Secondary School - Main St., Naxxar
  - Advanced, Intermediate & SEC/O Level Course (AIO)
  - GEM 16+ Programme
  - Individual Study Programme for Adult Learners (IPAL)
  - Matriculation Course (MC)
  - Medicine and Sciences Specialised Study Programme (MSSP)
  - National Youth Sports Programme (NYSP)
- MCAST
  - MCAST Main Campus - Triq Kordin, Paola
  - MCAST Institute for the Creative Arts - Misraħ Għonoq Tarġa Gap, Mosta
  - MCAST Institute of Applied Sciences, Centre of Agriculture, Aquatics and Animal Sciences - Luqa Road, Qormi
- Mikiel Anton Vassalli College, Ħamrun
  - Malta School of Art, Valletta
  - Malta School of Drama and Dance, Ħamrun
  - Malta School of Music, Ħamrun
- The Mediterranean College of Sport (MST) - Triq Xorrox, Birkirkara

== Schools in Gozo ==
=== Primary schools ===
- Anton Buttigieg Qala Primary School - Bishop Michael Buttigieg Street, Qala
- Anton Cassar Ghajnsielem Primary School - J.F.De Chambrey Street, Għajnsielem
- Dun Salv Portelli San Lawrenz Primary School - Our Lady of Sorrows Street, San Lawrenz
- Dun Salv Vella Nadur Primary School - Tiġrija Road, Nadur
- Ġużè' Aquilina Sannat Primary School & Special Unit - Sannat Road, Sannat
- Karmni Grima Għarb Primary School - Visitation Street, Għarb
- Laura Vicuna School - Our Saviour Square, Għasri, Gozo
- Mons Giovanni Andrea Vella Zebbug Primary School - St. Andrew Street, Żebbuġ
- Patri Mattew Sultana Xagħra Primary School - Tiġrija Street, Xagħra
- Peter Paul Grech Primary School - Orvieto Square, Kerċem
- Roza Magro Xewkija Primary School - Soil Street, Xewkija
- Sir Arturo Mercieca Victoria Primary School - Vajringa Street, Victoria
- St Francis Primary School - Madre G Camilleri Str, Nadur
- St Francis School - Triq Palma, Victoria

=== Middle/Secondary schools ===
- Gozo College - Triq il-Pitkalija, Xewkija
- Gozo Visual & Performing Arts School - Soil Street, Xewkija (Mikiel Anton Vassalli College)
- Kan G P Aguis DE Solidanis Middle School - Fortunato Mizzi St., Victoria
- MCAST Gozo Campus - J.F. De Chambray Street, Għajnsielem
- Ninu Cremona Secondary School - Fortunato Mizzi Street, Victoria
- Sacred Heart Minor Seminary - Triq Enrico Mizzi, Victoria Gozo

== See also ==
- Education in Malta
- List of universities in Malta
