= Football in Malta =

- Country: Malta
- Governing body: Malta Football Association
- National teams: men's national team women's national team
- First played: 1863; 163 years ago
- Clubs: 54

National competitions
- Maltese Cup; Maltese Women's Cup

Club competitions
- Maltese Premier League; Maltese Challenge League; Maltese National Amateur League; Maltese Women's League

International competitions
- Men's Champions League; Women's Champions League; Europa League; Europa Conference League; Super Cup; FIFA Club World Cup; FIFA World Cup (Men's National Team); Men's European Championship (Men's National Team); UEFA Nations League (Men's National Team); FIFA Women's World Cup (Women's National Team); Women's European Championship

Football in Malta is run by the Malta Football Association. Association football is the most popular sport in Malta. The sport was introduced to Malta during British rule in the mid-19th century. The sport at the time was new to England, and was used as a means of entertainment for the soldiers stationed in Malta at the various barracks around Malta at the time. In 1863 a football association was formed which governed rules and regulations for this quickly changing sport, which was still in amateur competition stage and played in an un-scheduled format until 1909 when a league format was introduced.

The association runs the men's national football team, the women's national team, as well as administering the semi-professional Maltese Premier League, Maltese Women's League and the respective cups for club sides.

== History ==
The first Maltese championship in the 1909-1910 season was won by Floriana. The league regularly changed in numbers as teams changed administrators, dropped out of the league, and new teams re-entered. Up until the season of 1939-1940 this first league remained the only league in Maltese football, and was called the Maltese division one. Sliema Wanderers and Floriana dominated, winning all but four championships up to 1940. The Maltese football league trophy was implemented in the 1935 season which Sliema Wanderers and Floriana continued to dominate up to the Second World War between them.

Unfortunately due to the Second World War, the league had to break-off since many Maltese players were drafted in to the defence of the island during the early 1940s when the Maltese archipelago were heavily involved in the North Africa conflict due to its strategic position in the Mediterranean Sea.

Normal league activity resumed in the 1945, after the end of the war with the league format of four teams joining including Sliema Wanderers and Floriana. The Maltese football association league format soon changed however, to a multiple tier format as from the 1946 season. The passing of the North Africa conflict saw the Maltese football associations largest interest with fifteen clubs registering to join the Maltese FA in the 1940s, doubling the size of the number of registered clubs within ten years. Many of today's familiar names joined the league including Valletta and Hibernians.

Interest in the Maltese league continued throughout the 1950s, 1960's and 1970s with fifteen more clubs joining the league including Birkirkara FC in 1950 . It was however Hibernians and Valletta who put together a good challenge to Sliema Wanderers and Floriana, winning eight championships between them, and three league trophies.

The 1980s saw the monopolization of Sliema Wanderers and Floriana finally come to an end with four clubs taking most of the honours in this decade. The inauguration of the new national stadium, Ta' Qali could have been a reason for this, with a large re-structuring of the Maltese league program to coincide with Maltese football's new impressive home. Hibernians F.C. went on to win the Maltese league championship in 1981 and 1982, Rabat Ajax (formed 1930) won in 1985, and 1986, however the real surprise came from one of Malta's oldest clubs, Ħamrun Spartans who won the league three times in 1983, 1987 and 1988, and won a five league trophies. Floriana did win the league trophy in 1981, but were relegated to Malta's second league in the 1985 season.

The last decades of the century saw the league format expand to its fourth tier, now with fifty clubs registered in the league. A diverse range of clubs now sharing the trophies in the Maltese league's top tier to contribute to an entertaining and high quality semi-professional football league. Valletta enjoyed a golden age in the 1990s winning five championships and four league cups. A re-juvenated Floriana won the championship in 1993, as well as two league cups, and Sliema Wanderers, Ħamrun Spartans and Hibernians also picked up notable honours. 1995 also saw the start of the Maltese Women's League, initially at only 5-a-side, though rapidly expanding to full 11-a-side in the start of the millennium. A second division was also briefly active, though the small number of teams involved meant that it was not maintained. It would return for several seasons across 2008-17, however. Hibernians F.C. were the main force in the early days of the league, winning 8 titles in a row from 1998 onwards.

At present there are a number of clubs with the resources and capability of winning the men's championship trophy, which is now called the Maltese Premier League trophy. Birkirkara FC are the notable new force in the Maltese league, after winning their first championship in the year 2000, and the team from Malta's largest town has regularly picked up honours since propelling itself into the history books. Other teams to have made relative impact were Żurrieq in the 1980s and Valletta in the late 1990s. Birkirkara FC have also made a name for themselves in the women's league, winning a number of titles and wresting dominance from Hibernians F.C. However, by the 2019/20 season, Hibernians F.C. were spent and quickly fell out of the title races, leaving Birkirkara FC unbeaten champions across the next 4 seasons.

== Early league format ==
The first Malta Football Association Premier League (1st Division) 1909-1910:

Pos	Team	Pld	W	D	L	GF	GA	GD	Pts
1	Floriana (C)	4	4	0	0	6	0	+6	8
2	Sliema Wanderers	4	2	1	1	5	2	+3	5
3	St. Joseph's United	4	2	0	2	4	4	0	4
4	Boys Empire League	4	1	1	2	7	4	+3	3
5	Malta University	4	0	0	4	0	12	−12	0

Source: RSSSF
Rules for classification: 1) points;
(C) Champions

The fourth season of the women's league, 1998-1999:

Pos	Team	Pld	W	D	L	GF	GA	GD	Pts	
1	Hibernians F.C. (C)	14	12	0	2	58	8	+50	36	Champions
2	Birkirkara F.C.	14	11	1	2	56	11	+45	34	
3	Mosta F.C.	14	11	0	3	39	11	+28	33	
4	Melita F.C.	14	9	1	4	44	13	+31	28	
5	Mellieħa S.C.	14	6	0	8	30	18	+12	18	
6	Raiders S.C.	14	3	1	10	9	49	−40	10	
7	Floriana F.C.	14	2	0	12	12	39	−27	6	
8	Qormi F.C.	14	0	1	13	3	102	−99	1	Relegation

Source: rsssf.com
(C) Champions

== Current system ==
Currently the Maltese men's national and official system consists of 54 teams within 4 divisions. These are the Maltese Premier League, the Maltese Challenge League, and the Maltese National Amateur League I&II. The FA Trophy is a knockout competition for all clubs taking part in league competitions in Malta and Gozo; the winners play the Premier League champions in the Maltese Super Cup.

A similar structure follows for the women's temas, albeit smaller in scale. The Maltese Women's League is the only league currently in place, with a similar knockout tournament coming with the Maltese Women's Cup.

== Other competitions ==
Other football competitions run in Malta include:

- the Youth League - Commonly known as the Minors' League
- the Youth Leagues (not to be confused with the previous one) - organised by the Youth FA for boys aged up to 17 (an U20 women's league was trialled unsuccessfully)

== Viewership and attendances ==
In the latest decades, particularly the 1990s the Maltese leagues have not had high attendances except for particular derby matches or league deciders. This has often been attributed to various reasons, including the higher quality of foreign leagues (especially the Italian Serie A and the English Premier League), slow-paced football, low interest, relatively unknown players, lack of professionalism and perceived corruption. This has improved since the promotion of Qormi to the top tier, a team which has had a strong following ever since getting promoted. A phenomenon also occurred in the lowest tier, where Zejtun Corinthians and Naxxar Lions, two sides from relatively large localities, started to push for promotion from the Maltese Third Division during season 2009-10. This ended up in a rivalry between the two teams who boasted stronger squads when compared to the other Third Division teams, thus attracting larger crowds than usual. However attendances remain relatively low in numbers. Very few statistics are available.

== English and Italian rivalries ==
Most Maltese people prefer to watch English and Italian leagues. This traces its beginning to the nation's political past, where in the 1930s a hot political issue was the Language Question, i.e. whether Malta had to adopt either Italian or English as an official language. This created pro-British and pro-Italian factions within the Maltese, virtually splitting the population in two. This rivalry now remains subtly in the nation's main political parties, but also in football, where as said before Maltese prefer foreign leagues to the Maltese one. During World Cups Maltese generally side with either the English or the Italians. Popular foreign clubs are mainly Manchester United, Chelsea, Liverpool, Juventus, Milan and Inter. Popular national teams apart from their own are mainly England and Italy, with Brazil in the third place, followed by Germany and the Netherlands to a lesser extent. These foreign fandoms generally divert attention from Maltese football to the detriment of the Maltese leagues and the Malta national football team.

== Attendances ==
The average attendance per top-flight football league season and the club with the highest average attendance:

Season	League average	Best club	Best club average
2011-12	858	Valletta FC	2,502

Source: League page on Wikipedia
