= Joseph Calleja =

Maltese operatic tenor (born 1978)

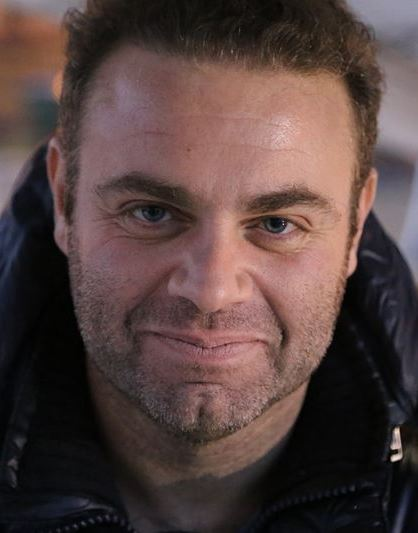
- Born: 22 January 1978 (age 48); Attard, Malta
- Education: De la Salle College
- Occupation: Operatic tenor
- Years active: 1997–present
- Height: 189 cm (6 ft 2 in)
- Children: 2
- Website: josephcalleja.com

Joseph Calleja (born 22 January 1978) is a Maltese operatic tenor.

== Early life and career ==
Calleja was born in Attard, Malta. He began singing at the age of 16, having been discovered by tenor Brian Cefai and continued his studies with Maltese tenor Paul Asciak. He attended De La Salle College. At the age of 19 he made his operatic debut as Macduff in Verdi's Macbeth at the Astra Theatre in Gozo and went on to become a prize winner at the Belvedere Hans Gabor Competition the same year. In 1998, he won the Caruso Competition in Milan and was a prize winner in Plácido Domingo's Operalia in 1999.

On 2 November 2012, the University of Malta presented Calleja with a Doctor of Literature Honoris Causa in acknowledgement of his achievements as an internationally renowned tenor. On 8 October 2015, he was elected to the board of directors of the European Academy of Music Theatre.

== Concerts in Malta ==
In 2009, Calleja began a series of annual concerts at the Granaries in Malta. The first concert was performed with Michael Bolton. In 2010, he sang with Dionne Warwick and Riccardo Cocciante and his choir of 500 children. In 2011, he appeared with soprano Hayley Westenra and Italian singer Lucio Dalla. In 2012, he was joined by Ronan Keating and Gigi D'Alessio. In 2013, he sang with Zucchero, Rebecca Ferguson, Gianluca Bezzina, Riccardo Cocciante and Tenisha. In 2015, he sang with Anastacia as a special guest. In 2012, Calleja was appointed Malta's first Cultural Ambassador, a role he takes very seriously.

== Recordings ==
Calleja's first solo recital disc, 'Tenor Arias', was released in 2004. He followed that up in 2005 with The Golden Voice. In 2011, his third solo album Joseph Calleja – The Maltese Tenor reached second overall position on the German charts and debuted at number one in the US Billboard Classical Traditional chart. His 2011 DVD of La traviata from the Royal Opera House and co-starring Renée Fleming was nominated for a Grammy award. His 2020 album The Magic of Mantovani. The Original Recordings With Joseph Calleja topped Amazon's UK's Opera Charts.

== Philanthropy ==
The Drake Calleja Trust came into existence on 1 September 2015. Established by publisher and philanthropist James Drake, the patron of this trust is Joseph Calleja. It has awarded seventy scholarships for studies in the United Kingdom to exceptionally talented music students of classical music on undergraduate, postgraduate, and research levels. Through these grants, students have purchased new instruments, participated in competitions, masterclasses and training, attended auditions in the UK and other countries, made recordings, and furthered their studies.

On 25 October 2013, Calleja together with Bank of Valletta, launched the BOV Joseph Calleja Foundation. The aim of the foundation is to help vulnerable individuals and social groups in the Maltese community. Specifically, its attention is directed towards helping underprivileged children with unique artistic or musical talents.

== List of recordings and videos ==
- 2003: DVD of Maria Stuarda featuring Calleja as Leicester, recorded by the Fondazione Orchestra Stabile de Bergamo
- 2004: Solo recital disc, Tenor Arias, conducted by Riccardo Chailly with the Orchestra Sinfonica e Coro di Milano
- 2004: "Puccini Discoveries": Cantata Cessato il suon dell'armi, conducted by Riccardo Chailly with the Orchestra Sinfonica e Coro di Milano
- 2005: Solo recital disc, The Golden Voice, conducted by Carlo Rizzi with the Academy of St Martin in the Fields
- 2009: CD of I Capuleti e i Montecchi featuring Calleja as Tebaldo, conducted by Fabio Luisi
- 2010: DVD of Simon Boccanegra featuring Calleja as Gabriele Adorno with Plácido Domingo in the title role; recorded at the Royal Opera House, Covent Garden, London
- 2011: DVD of La traviata featuring Calleja as Alfredo Germont, recorded at the Royal Opera House, Covent Garden, London (Grammy nomination)
- 2011: Solo recital disc, The Maltese Tenor, with the Orchestre de la Suisse Romande
- 2012: Solo recital disc, Be My Love – A Tribute to Mario Lanza, BBC Concert Orchestra, conducted by Steven Mercurio
- 2013: Solo recital disc, Amore, with the BBC Concert Orchestra, conducted by Steven Mercurio and featuring Nicola Benedetti and Ksenija Sidorova
- 2013: CD of Simon Boccanegra featuring Calleja as Gabriele Adorno with Thomas Hampson in the title role; conducted by Massimo Zanetti
- 2016: DVD and Blu-ray of Mefistofele featuring Calleja as Faust, with René Pape in the title role; conducted by Omer Meir Wellber at Bayerische Staatsoper, Munich.
- 2018: Verdi, Orchestra de la Comunitat Valenciana, conducted by Ramón Tebar, Decca

Calleja made a guest appearance on Renée Fleming's album By Request, singing the role of Alfredo in the act 1 closing scene of La traviata. His recording of "La donna è mobile" from Verdi's Rigoletto was featured in the soundtrack for the 2007 film No Reservations, starring Catherine Zeta-Jones.

== Film ==
Calleja appears as tenor Enrico Caruso in James Gray's 2013 film The Immigrant, which also features Joaquin Phoenix and Marion Cotillard.

== Repertory ==
- Zephoris in Si j'étais roi (Adolphe Adam)
- Tebaldo in I Capuleti e i Montecchi (Vincenzo Bellini)
- Arturo in I puritani (Bellini)
- Elvino in La sonnambula (Bellini)
- Pollione in Norma (Bellini)
- Lind in Isabella (Azio Corghi)
- Nemorino in L'elisir d'amore (Gaetano Donizetti)
- Edgardo in Lucia di Lammermoor (Donizetti)
- Leicester in Maria Stuarda (Donizetti)
- Ernesto in Don Pasquale (Donizetti)
- Roberto Devereux in Roberto Devereux (Donizetti)
- Faust in Faust (Charles Gounod)
- Roméo in Roméo et Juliette (Gounod)
- Don Ottavio in Don Giovanni (Mozart)
- Rodolfo in La bohème (Giacomo Puccini)
- Rinuccio in Gianni Schicchi (Puccini)
- Count Almaviva in Il barbiere di Siviglia (Gioachino Rossini)
- Fenton in Falstaff (Giuseppe Verdi)
- Edoardo di Sanval in Un giorno di regno (Verdi)
- Macduff in Macbeth (Verdi)
- The Duke in Rigoletto (Verdi)
- Alfredo in La traviata (Verdi)
- Hoffmann in Les contes d'Hoffmann (Jacques Offenbach)
- Ruggiero in La rondine (Puccini)
- Nicias in Thaïs (Jules Massenet)
- Pinkerton in Madama Butterfly (Puccini)
- Gabriele Adorno in Simon Boccanegra (Verdi)
- Fritz in L'amico Fritz (Pietro Mascagni)
- Nadir in The Pearl Fishers (Georges Bizet)

== Personal life ==
Calleja has two children.
