= Gozo Women F.C. =

Gozo W.F.C.
- Full name: Gozo Women Football Club
- Nickname: Gozo Girls
- Founded: 1995
- Dissolved: 2017
- Ground: Kerċem Ajax Stadium
- League: Maltese Women's League
- 2016–17: 6th
Home colours	Away colours

Gozo Women Football Club was a women's team based on the island of Gozo. The club used to represent the island in the Maltese Women's League. Like the men's team, Gozo Women was run by the Gozo Football Association.

== History ==
The club debuted in the first ever Maltese Women's League organised by the Malta Football Association in the 1995–6 season, which was played on a seven-a-side basis. Gozo Women's first president and coach were Victor Camilleri and Eucharist Mercieca respectively. Gozo Girls' first season was a rather successful one, especially for Rita Azzopardi, who ended up the team's top-scorer with 15 goals.

Gozo Women competed in the subsequent season as well, this time under the stewardship of Victor Camilleri. The 1995–6 season was held on a nine-a-side basis and Rachel Saliba led the scoring charts for Gozo with 15 goals. On both occasions, Gozo Women placed fourth and were knocked-out of the Maltese Women's Cup by Lija Athletics in the semi-finals. Following the conclusion of the said season, the club was disbanded.

=== Re-organisation ===
Gozo Women's disbandment proved temporary as following a hiatus of more than 10 years, Gozo Women was re-founded and participated in the 2007–08 Maltese Women's Cup in a match against Lija Athletic. Thereafter, Gozo Women participated in the Maltese Second Division in the 2008–09 season and played for six consecutive seasons.

During its first season following the re-organisation, Gozo Women won the Second Division with almost a perfect record and got promoted to the Maltese First Division, where they played until the 2013–14 season. Another two achievements during this period was the club having one of its ranks, namely Joslene Gafa, being crowned joint Malta Women's League player of the year during the 2009–10 season, and Gozo Women's appearance in the Maltese Women's Cup final during the 2010–11 season, wherein Gozo faced Maltese powerhouse Birkirkara, a match the Gozo Girls eventually lost three-nil

Following a one-year hiatus during the 2014–15 season, Gozo Women was reformed for the 2015–16 season and competed in the Second Division. As in the case of its first season following its re-organisation, Gozo Women won the Second Division - also without losing a single match - and in the process won the right to compete again in the First Division during the 2016–17 season.

Gozo Women found the going tough in the top division and, out of twenty matches, they only won and drew once, and lost the remaining the eighteen matches. Following the conclusion of the 2016–17 season, Gozo Women was, at least for the time being, disbanded for good.

== Stadium ==
During its initial two year existence between 1995 and 1997, Gozo Women used to play its 'home' matches in Malta, with all matches bar two being played at the Infetti Stadium in Birkirkara. As for the other two matches, they were held at Qormi.

After its re-organisation in 2007, Gozo Women primarily played its home matches at the Sannat Ground. However, following the redevelopment of the Kerċem Ajax Stadium, Gozo Women switched its home matches to this stadium.

== Achievements ==
- Maltese Second Division:

- Winners (2): 2008–2009 & 2015–2016

- Maltese Women's Cup:

- Runners-Up (1): 2010–2011

== League and cup history ==
Season	League									Knockout
Season	Div.	Pos.	Pl.	W	D	L	GS	GA	P	Knockout
1995–96	1st	4th	16	8	3	5	45	36	27	Semi-Finals
1996–97	Phase 1	3rd	10	6	1	3	44	9	19	Semi-Finals
1996–97	Champ. Pool	4th	10	4	2	4	13	16	14	Semi-Finals
2007–08	Did not participate									Quarter-Finals
2008–09	2nd	1st	14	14	0	0	130	5	42	Semi-Finals
2009–10	1st	4th	15	6	1	8	34	40	19	Semi-Finals
2010–11	1st	4th	15	4	2	9	19	42	14	Runners-Up
2011–12	1st	4th	18	9	2	7	38	31	29	Quarter-Finals
2012–13	1st	4th	20	7	2	11	37	51	23	Semi-Finals
2013–14	1st	4th	18	9	0	9	45	39	27	Quarter-Finals
2014–15	Did not participate									
2015–16	2nd	1st	18	17	1	0	90	13	52	Semi-Finals
2016–17	1st	6th	20	1	1	18	11	82	4	First Round

== League record club by club ==
This is the all-time record against clubs in league matches.

Opponent	Pl.	W	D	L	GS	GA	GD	Biggest Win	Biggest Loss
Banks	2	2	0	0	8	1	7	6–0	N/A
Birkirkara	22	0	3	19	14	91	(77)	N/A	0–8
Hamrun Spartans	9	7	1	1	38	7	31	8–0	2–5
Hibernians	22	3	2	17	21	83	(62)	4–1	0–13
Kirkop United	7	2	0	5	10	20	(10)	4–1	0–6
Kirkop United II	3	3	0	0	24	1	23	9–0	N/A
Lija-Iklin	2	2	0	0	31	1	30	18-1	N/A
Lija Athletics	6	0	1	5	7	18	(11)	N/A	2-6
Marsa	5	5	0	0	40	2	38	14-0	N/A
Melita	5	5	0	0	20	3	17	7–0	N/A
Mellieha	2	1	1	0	4	3	1	3-2	N/A
Mgarr United	14	6	1	7	26	30	(4)	5-1	0–4; 1–5
Mosta	20	4	3	13	30	57	(27)	4-0; 5–1	0–7
Pembroke Athleta	10	9	0	1	47	4	43	11–0	1–2
Planets	2	2	0	0	9	0	9	5–0	N/A
Qormi	2	2	0	0	9	3	6	6-3; 3-0	N/A
Rabat Ajax	6	1	1	4	6	14	(8)	1-0	0-4
Raiders Luxol	16	12	2	2	41	14	27	6–0	0–2
Santa Venera YB	2	2	0	0	10	1	9	7–0	N/A
Sliema Wanderers	3	3	0	0	11	6	5	5–2	N/A
St. Patricks	2	2	0	0	10	0	10	6-0	N/A
Swieqi United	3	3	0	0	11	3	8	4–0	N/A
Ta' Xbiex	2	2	0	0	22	0	22	12–0	N/A
Tarxien Rainbows	7	7	0	0	57	1	56	15–0	N/A

== Notable players ==
The following are players who represented Malta whilst playing for Gozo.

- Nicole Buttigieg
- Tracy Theuma
- Ann-Marie Said
- Emma Xuereb
