= St Edward's College, Malta =

Coordinates: 35.8814°N 14.5293°E

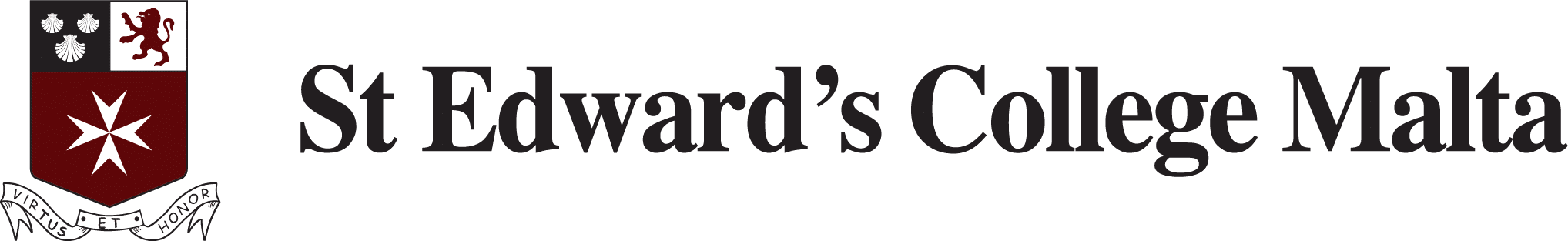
- Cottonera; Malta

Information
- Type: Independent private boarding school
- Motto: Latin: Virtus Et Honor (Strength and Honor)
- Religious affiliation: Roman Catholic
- Patron saint: St. Edward the Confessor
- Established: 1 October 1929 (97 years ago)
- Founder: Baroness Strickland, Countess della Catena
- Headmaster: Nollaig Mac an Bhaird
- Staff: 114
- Gender: Co-education
- Age: 4 to 18
- Enrollment: 680
- Language: English
- Houses: Congreve - Ducane - Campbell
- Rival: De La Salle College (Malta)
- Publication: The Weekly Gazette
- Yearbook: The Edwardian
- Alumni: Old Edwardians
- Website: stedwards.edu.mt

St Edward's College, Malta is a Maltese private co-educational independent school, with optional boarding, in Cottonera. Its enrollment is just under 700 pupils of 5–18 years of age. It was founded in 1929 by Baroness Strickland, Countess della Catena, who gave a private donation to establish it. It was built on the grounds of what was once a Knights of Malta fort; the rear end of the school is still surrounded by the fort's bastion walls. The school was modelled on the ideas and ideals of British public schools, initially to educate the boys of the Maltese aristocracy and the boys of Malta-based British military officers.

== Background history ==
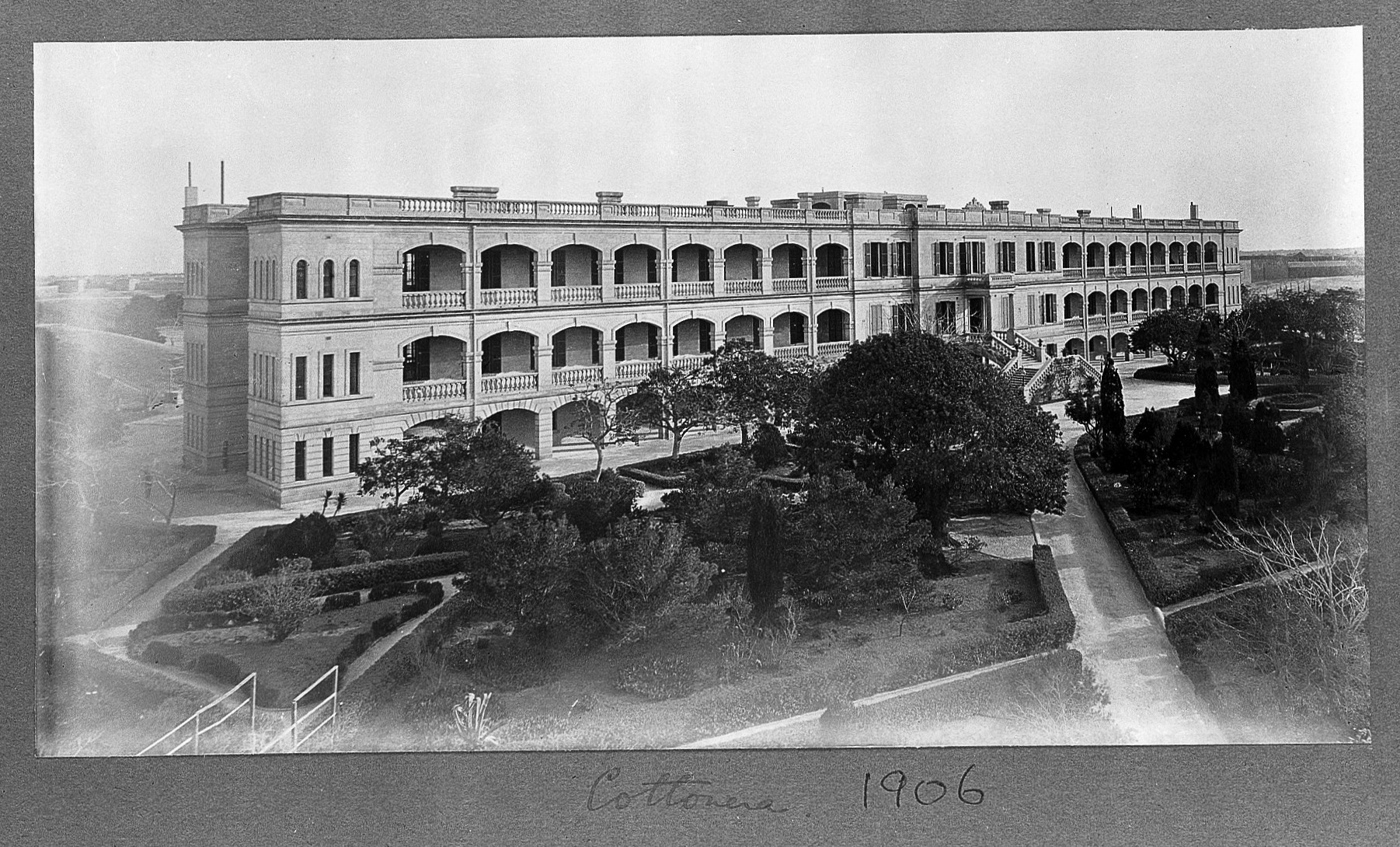
Cottonera Military Hospital in 1906

The Governor of Malta, Sir John Du Cane, obtained the buildings of what was once the Cottonera Military Hospital in Vittoriosa, along with the parade ground adjoining to St. Clement's bastions built by the Knights of Malta. The perimeter of the western side of the site formed part of the Cottonera lines, a fortified wall built by the Knights of St John. The extensive grounds between the bastion walls and the old hospital buildings would serve as ideal recreational areas and would also give the college enough space for expansion when needed.

Thus, with an ideal site secured and the necessary financial backing guaranteed, a small group of men, among them senior notable members of the Maltese nobility, gathered in the Governor's Palace in Valletta on 18 January 1929 to sign a foundation deed of trust. The following October the school opened its gates to twenty-nine foundation pupils.

The numbers of pupils during the college's first years would remain considerably low due to the relatively high fees which were necessary to keep the college running. The British Council's timely financial backing made it possible for the college to lower fees for local pupils. As a result, the population grew steadily with an increasing number of Maltese gentry sending their boys to the school.

In the mid-1930s, an old ammunitions depot built by the Knights of St John was converted into the college's chapel. Physics and chemistry laboratories and additional dormitories were also developed at this time.

By the late 1930s, it became apparent that the buildings could not be altered or modified further and the construction of a new wing was proposed. However, with the advent of World War II, these plans had to be shelved since the college's perilously close proximity to Malta's main harbours necessitated a temporary relocation to the old seminary in Mdina for the duration of the war.

The building of the new classrooms (the middle school block) occurred after the boys and college masters moved back to Cottonera in 1946. With the new classrooms completed, few other structural changes were made for nearly two decades, at which point the need for modern science facilities became a pressing issue. A successful fundraising campaign resulted in the laying of the foundation stone of the new block in 1967 by Sir Maurice Dorman, the last British Governor-General of Malta. With a donation made by the trustees of the British Boys Schools of Alexandria and the Victoria College, Alexandria Foundation, the much-needed Assembly Hall in the new block became a reality.

In the 1970s, the block that used to house the married teachers was converted into the junior school, which also included an infant's section. Due to the college's growing popularity, the junior school received a structural revamping and extension in 1994. Classrooms were enlarged and the designs (by Old Edwardian Richard England) also ensured that the junior school building now had their own drama and music hall as well as an IT room.

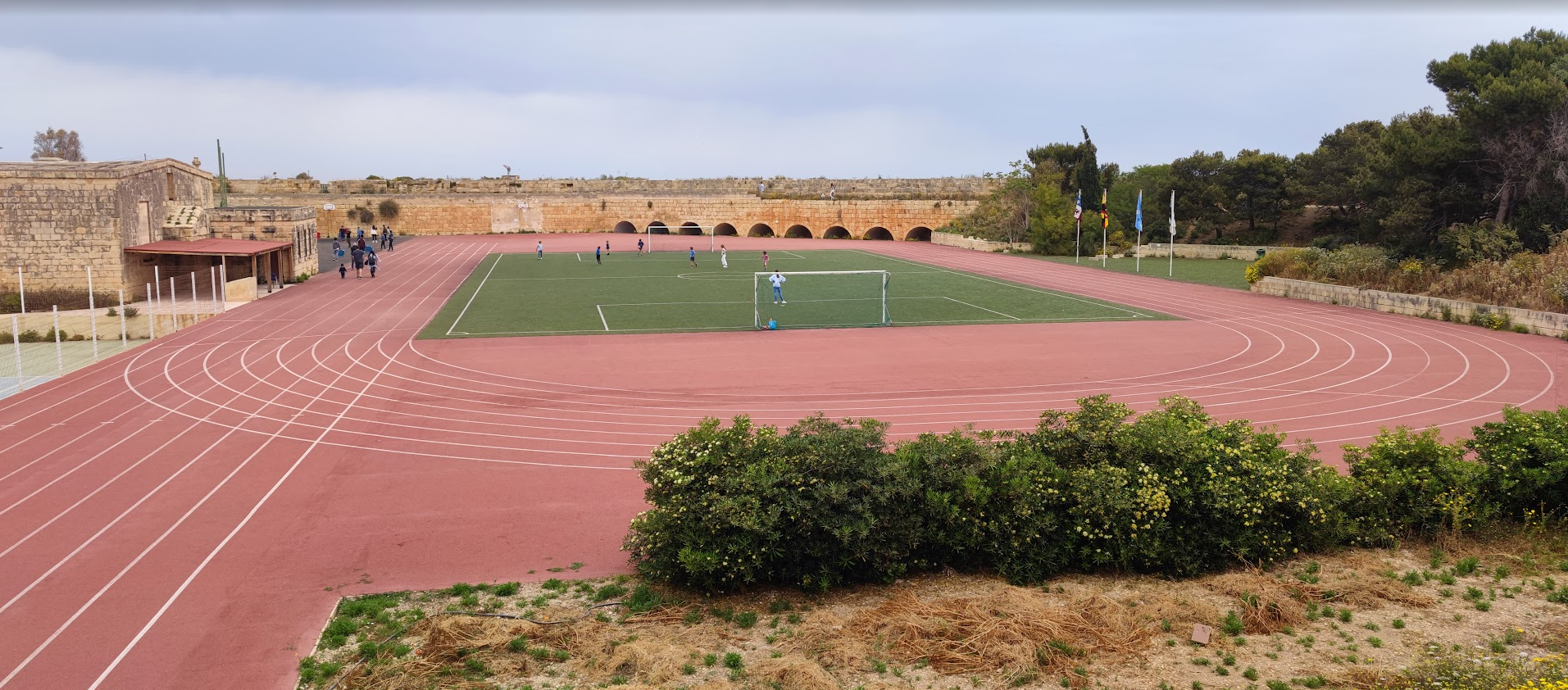
Sports Track

In 2013, the school's track was laid out.

In December 2024, the school announced plans to fully transition a co-education learning environment as of September 2025. The transition was planned to be implemented incrementally, starting the co-educational cohort from Year 1.

In October 2025, an obstacle course was laid out after planning it out for 3 years.

== Sports ==
In 1932, the school was awarded the Victor Ludorum; a silver bugle by the 100 'Old Ignatians'. The Victor Ludorum, is presented to the highest achieving athlete during the school's Sports Day.

In 1933, the 3 house system was set up. The names of the houses are after three Governor Generals of Malta. The 3 houses are:

1. Congreve, after Sir Walter Congreve (Blue)
2. Ducane, after Sir John Du Cane (Green)
3. Campbell, after Sir David Campbell (Red)

The 3 houses compete annually in competitions such as football, cross-country, high jump, long jump, discus, ball throw, relay and athletics.

== Logos ==
The first school logo which the College used was the coat of arms of St. Edward the Confessor. Eventually the College changed their logo to one featuring three silver seashells (originating from the Strickland coat of arms) and a lion rampant in the chief, while in the centre a Maltese Cross and directly underneath the cross the motto "Virtus et Honor" (Virtue and Honour).

Royal Arms of Edward the Confessor which was used as the first College Logo

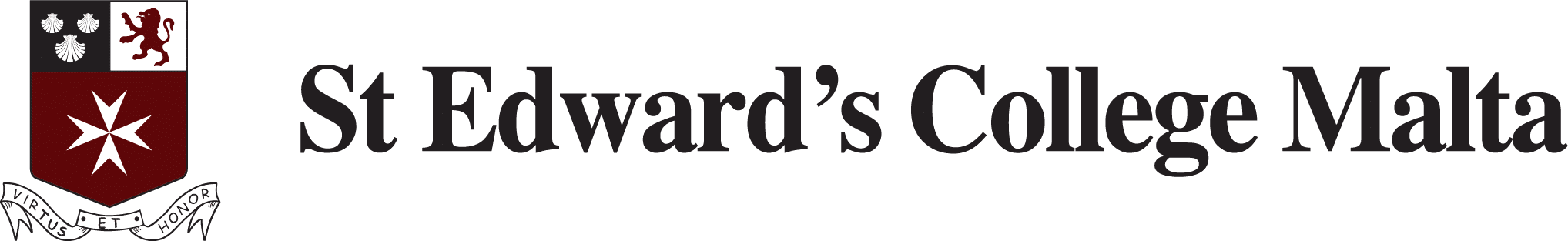
Current College Logo

== Subjects Taught ==
Physics, Chemistry and Biology are taught in the Senior Section (Grades 9 to 11) and in the Sixth Form. The College teaches main subjects in English, while Maltese, Spanish, Italian and French are taught in their respective languages. In Grade 6, an extra language and an ethical subject are chosen while in Grade 8 O-Level subjects are chosen.

== Alumni ==
Among the many famous alumni of the school is the late Professor Edward De Bono, known for his ideas on lateral thinking. Other well known alumni include architect Richard England, the late former Lord Chief Justice of England and Wales, Igor Judge, Baron Judge, former President of Malta Ugo Mifsud Bonnici, the late Chief Justice Emeritus Giuseppe Mifsud Bonnici, Archbishop of Malta Charles Scicluna. Footballers Andrew Hogg and Matthew Guillaumier, also Explorer Justin Packshaw attended the College.

Since its foundation in 1929, the school had produced many who went on to serve in the British military and the Colonial Service in Egypt, Palestine and the Sudan. The school has an old-boys' alumni association known as the Old Edwardian Association (OEA).

== Past headmasters ==
- 1929 – 1945 F Kerr McClement
- 1945 – 1952 H.B.L. Hughes
- 1952 – 1955 Gerald Carey (acting headmaster)
- 1955 – 1966 Rudesind Brookes
- 1966 – 1972 Bernard Rickett
- 1972 – 1974 Alan Dukes
- 1974 – 1976 Thomas Glass
- 1976 – 1989 Antoine Cachia Caruana
- 1989 – 1997 Gerald Briscoe
- 1997 – 2002 William Dimech
- 2002 – 2007 Anthony Saliba
- 2007 – 2012 Michael Chittenden
- 2012 – 2015 George Psaila
- 2015 – present Nollaig Mac an Bhaird

== See also ==
- Education in Malta
- List of schools in Malta
