= Bingemma =

Binġemma
- Hamlet
- Binġemma
- Location within Malta
- Coordinates: 35°54′33.5″N 14°22′27.2″E
- Country: Malta
- Region: Northern Region
- Local council: Mġarr
- Demonym(s): Binġemmi (m), Binġemmija (f), Binġemmin (pl)

Bingemma (Maltese: Binġemma) is a small hamlet in the Northern Region of Malta. It lies on the outskirts of Mġarr and Rabat and falls under the Mġarr Local Council. The area is mostly known for its agricultural land, for its chapel and for the Victoria Lines, which run through it.

== See also ==
- Mġarr
- Victoria Lines
- Chapel of Our Lady of Itria
- Fort Binġemma
