= St. Michael School (Malta) =

Location
- Santa Venera, Malta
- Coordinates: 35°53′16.5″N 14°28′24.6″E

Information
- Type: Roman Catholic secondary school
- Motto: Tradition, Excellence, Character
- Established: 4 November 1946 (79 years ago)
- Founder: Anthony Agius
- Headmaster: Raymond D'Amato
- Gender: Boys
- Age range: 11 – 16
- Website: stmichaelschool.edu.mt

St. Michael School is a Roman Catholic secondary school located in Santa Venera, Malta. It is run by the Society of Christian Doctrine (M.U.S.E.U.M.) in Malta. The school was founded in Marsa in 1946, but it moved to new premises in Santa Venera in the 1950s. It caters for boys aged 11 to 16 years.

== History ==
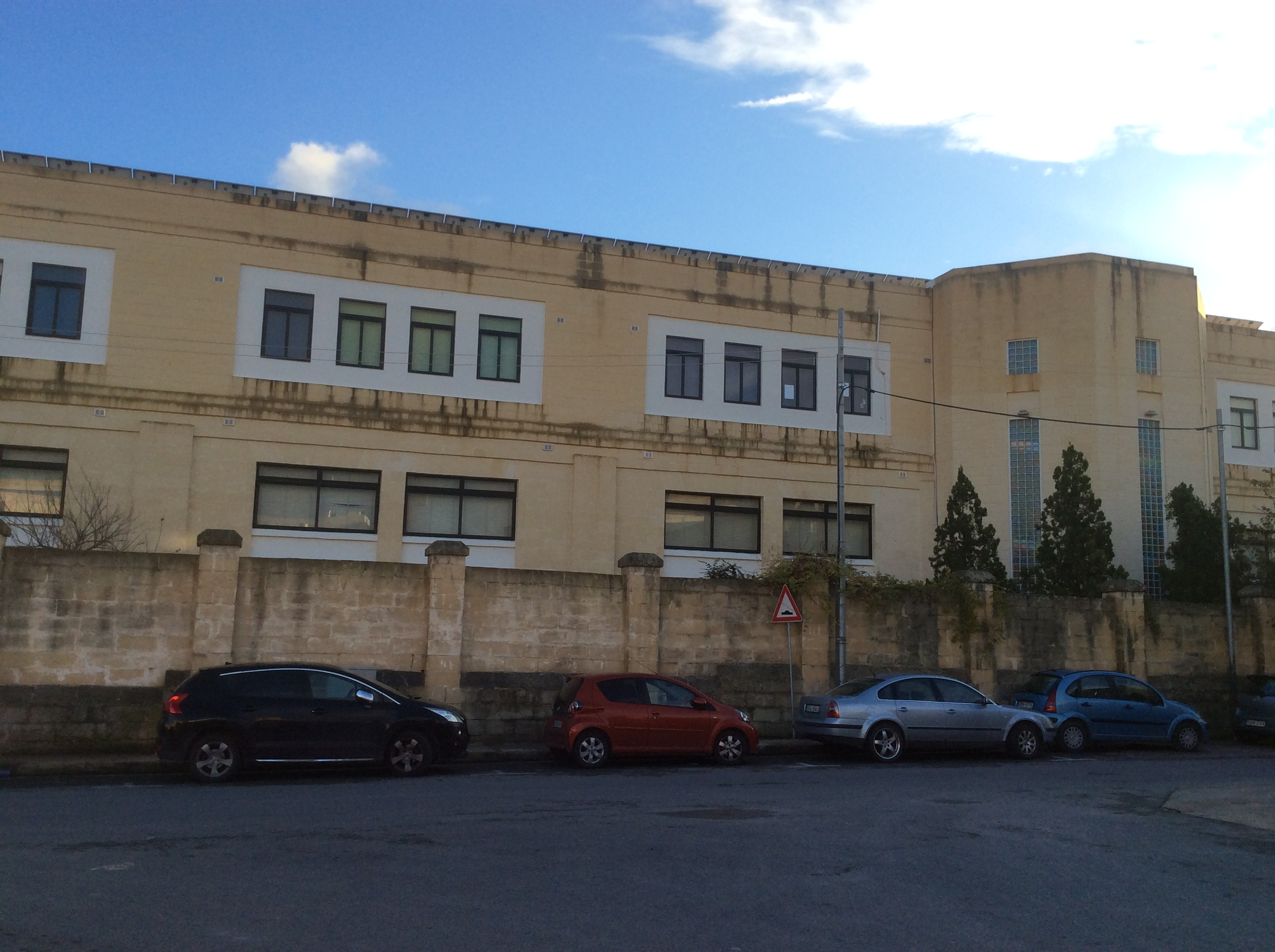
St. Michael School

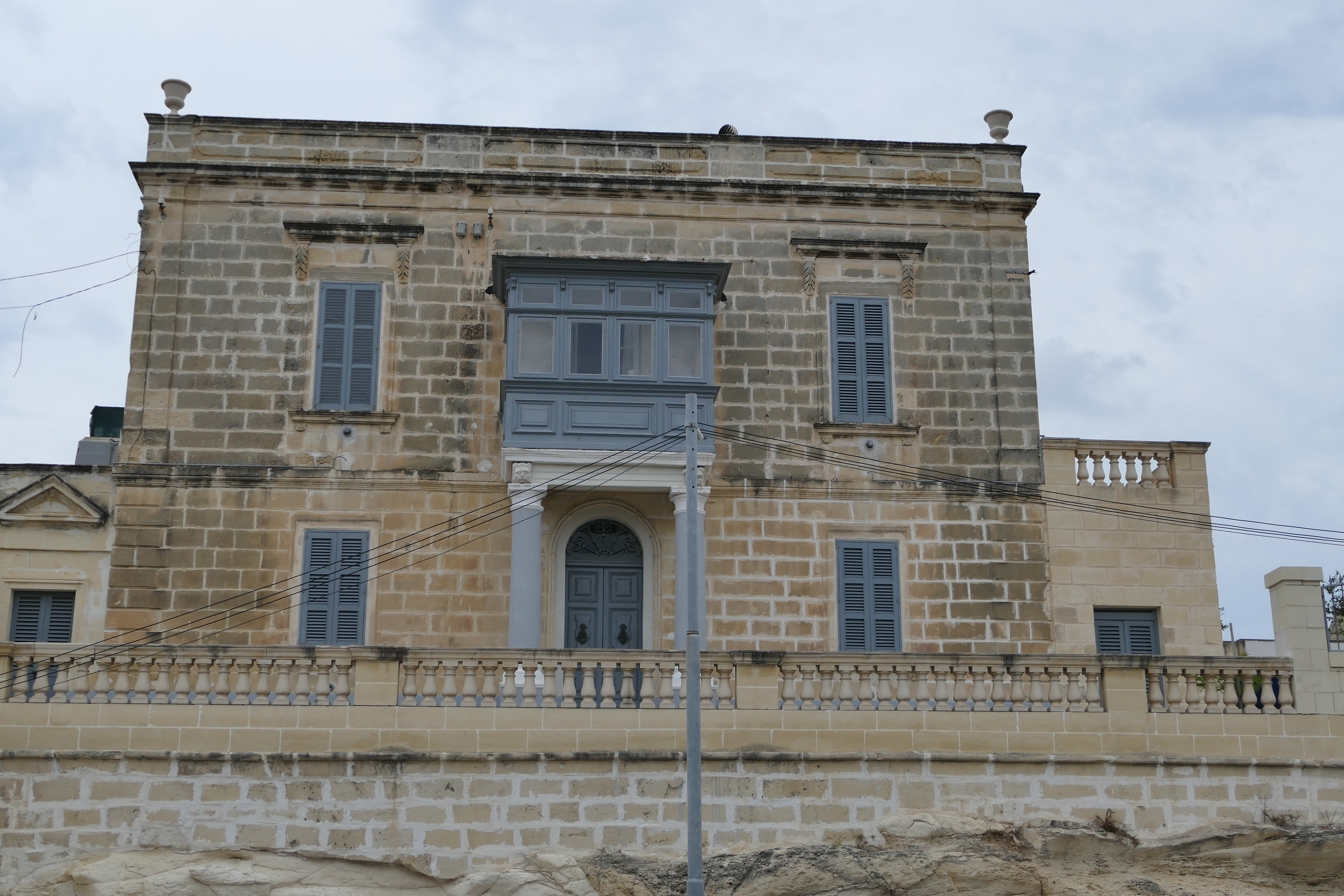
Villa Violette

St. Michael School was founded on 4 November 1946 by Anthony Agius with the support of George Preca and Carmel Callus. The school was initially housed at Villa Violette in Marsa. The villa is now a Grade 2 scheduled property. In 1951, construction of the present school began on the outskirts of Santa Venera. The building was designed by the architect Ġużè Damato, and it was built under the supervision of Joseph Sultana. The school was improved in the 1980s, and it was extended between 1990 and 1996. Another floor was built between 2008 and 2011.

The school's founder Anthony Agius remained headmaster until his death in 1989, and he was succeeded by Raymond D'Amato, who is still headmaster as of 2024.

== See also ==
- Education in Malta
- List of schools in Malta
