= Jose Borg =

Maltese football manager (born 1973)

Personal information
- Date of birth: 6 April 1973 (age 53)
- Place of birth: Swieqi, Malta

Managerial career
- Years: Team
- 2015–2016: St. Andrews
- 2016–2017: Pietà Hotspurs (youth)
- 2017–2019: Tarxien Rainbows
- 2019–2020: Marsa
- 2021–2022: FC Manitoba
- 2022–2024: Birkirkara (women)
- 2024: Birkirkara
- 2024–2026: Zurrieq Men

Jose Borg (born 6 April 1973) is a Maltese football manager who manages St. Andrews.

== Life and career ==
Borg was born on 6 April 1973 in Swieqi, Malta and attended St Edward's College, Malta. He has been described as a "well-known name in the [Maltese] women’s game". He obtained a UEFA Pro License. He has been regarded to prefer the 3-4-3 formation. In 2015, he was appointed manager of Maltese side St. Andrews. In 2016, he was appointed as a youth manager of Maltese side Pietà Hotspurs. In 2017, he was appointed as manager of Maltese side Tarxien Rainbows. In 2019, he was appointed manager of the Maltese side Marsa. In 2021, he was appointed manager of Canadian side FC Manitoba. He became the first Maltese manager to manage a professional North American side. He managed them during the coronavirus pandemic.

In 2022, he was appointed manager of the women's team of Maltese side Birkirkara. He was described as "[aiming to] help a winning side to improve even more and have a clear identity in their playing style" while managing the club. He helped them win the league. He managed them in the UEFA Women's Champions League. In 2024, he was appointed manager of their men's team. After that, he returned to the Maltese side St. Andrews as manager.
