= 2026–27 Maltese Women's League =

Maltese Women's League
- Season: 2026–27
- Dates: 17 September 2026 – May 2026
- Matches: 9
- Goals: 34 (3.78 per match)
- All statistics correct as of 3 October 2026.

The 2026–27 Maltese Women's League (also known as the Assikura Women's League for sponsorship reasons) is the 32nd season of the top-level women's football league in Malta, and the second under the Assikura sponsorship name. The season began on 17 September 2026 and is scheduled to conclude in 2027. The league is organised by the Malta Football Association (MFA). Mgarr United enter the competition as champions after lifting the title for the first time in the previous season. They also begin the competition as reigning Super Cup champions after beating the previous seasons runner-up and reigning Super Cup holders Swieqi United.

== Season summary ==
The 2026–27 Assikura Women's League features six teams, maintaining the same format as the previous season. The competition is played over four rounds, meaning each team will play a total of 20 matches by the end of the campaign. The team finishing in first place will be crowned champion and will qualify for the first qualifying round of the UEFA Women's Champions League. The season officially got underway with the draws for the domestic competitions, held on Wednesday, 22 July 2026. The league is scheduled to run from September through December in its initial phase, featuring 10 match days before a break for the festive period.

== Teams ==
Location of teams in 2026–27 Maltese Women's League

The following six clubs are competing in the 2026–27 Assikura Women's League:

Team	City	Last season
Birkirkara	Birkirkara	4th
Hibernians	Paola	3rd
Mġarr United	Mgarr	1st
San Ġwann	San Ġwann	5th
Swieqi United	Swieqi	2nd
Valletta	Valletta	6th

=== Format ===
Each team plays each other four times, twice at home and twice away, for a total of 20 matches per team and 60 matches in the season. The team with the most points at the end of the season is crowned champion. If points are equal, the tie-breakers are: 1) goal difference; 2) goals scored; 3) head-to-head points; 4) head-to-head goal difference; 5) head-to-head goals scored.

=== Opening fixtures ===
The opening matchday took place between 17 and 19 September 2026. The fixtures were as follows:

- Thursday, 17 September 2026: Mġarr United vs Valletta (Centenary Stadium, 20:15)
- Saturday, 19 September 2026: Birkirkara vs San Ġwann (Charles Abela Stadium, 18:00)
- Saturday, 19 September 2026: Swieqi United vs Hibernians (Charles Abela Stadium, 20:30)

The opening match sees reigning champions Mġarr United begin their title defence against a reshaped Valletta side at the Centenary Stadium.

== League Table ==
Pos	Team	Pld	W	D	L	GF	GA	GD	Pts	Qualification
1	Swieqi United	3	2	0	1	9	2	+7	6	Qualification for the Champions League first qualifying round
2	Hibernians	3	2	0	1	8	4	+4	6	
3	Valletta	3	2	0	1	7	3	+4	6	
4	Mgarr United	3	2	0	1	5	3	+2	6	
5	Birkirkara	3	1	0	2	4	7	−3	3	
6	San Ġwann	3	0	0	3	1	15	−14	0	

Updated to match(es) played on 3 October 2026. Source:
Rules for classification: 1) Points; 2) Play-offs (only if needed to decide champions, relegation, or teams for relegation play-offs).

=== Results ===
Home \ Away	BIR	HIB	MGR	SGN	SWQ	VAL
Birkirkara	—	1–5		3–1		
Hibernians		—	1–2			
Mgarr United			—		0–1	3–1
San Ġwann				—	0–7	
Swieqi United		1–2			—	
Valletta	1–0			5–0		—

Updated to match(es) played on 3 October 2026. Source:
Legend: Blue = home team win; Yellow = draw; Red = away team win.
