= St. Paul's Missionary College (Malta) =

Maltese junior and secondary school

Coordinates: 35.8815°N 14.3959°E

St. Paul's Missionary College (abbreviated to SPMC) is a Maltese Junior School and Secondary School situated on Emmanuele Vitale Street in Rabat, Northern Region.

== History ==
Founded by the Missionary Society of St Paul as a non-fee-paying school, it received its first intake in October 1964 in what was then the ground floor and the library of the motherhouse that the community has in Rabat. The school was the brainchild of Fr Stanley Tomlin mssp.

In its first years, both the academic and support staff were all MSSP members. Work on the present premises of the school started in 1974 and was completed in 1982 with the inauguration of St Agatha's Auditorium. It was completed when the college was the only non-fee-paying private school in Malta, and MSSP members had no fixed income. Over the years, there have been developments in the school curriculum, particularly in science, information technology, and modern languages (French, (Italian and German).

The Junior School received its first intake in October 2011, after construction works were done on the former Depiro Youth Centre building. The Junior School and Senior School combined have a total of 528 students, with 48 students per age group further distributed between two classes of 24 each.

The College's ethos remains faithful to the MSSP Congregation's founder Joseph De Piro and seeks to create a space in which the educational community feels welcome and wherein they can receive a holistic Christian formation.

== See also ==
- Education in Malta
- List of schools in Malta
