= Maltese Women's League =

Association football league in Malta

- Founded: 1995; 31 years ago
- Country: Malta
- Confederation: UEFA
- Divisions: 1
- Number of clubs: 6
- Level on pyramid: 1
- Domestic cup: Maltese Women's Cup
- International cup: UEFA Champions League
- Current champions: Mġarr United (1st title) (2025–26)
- Most championships: Birkirkara (13 titles)
- Website: website
- Current: 2026-27

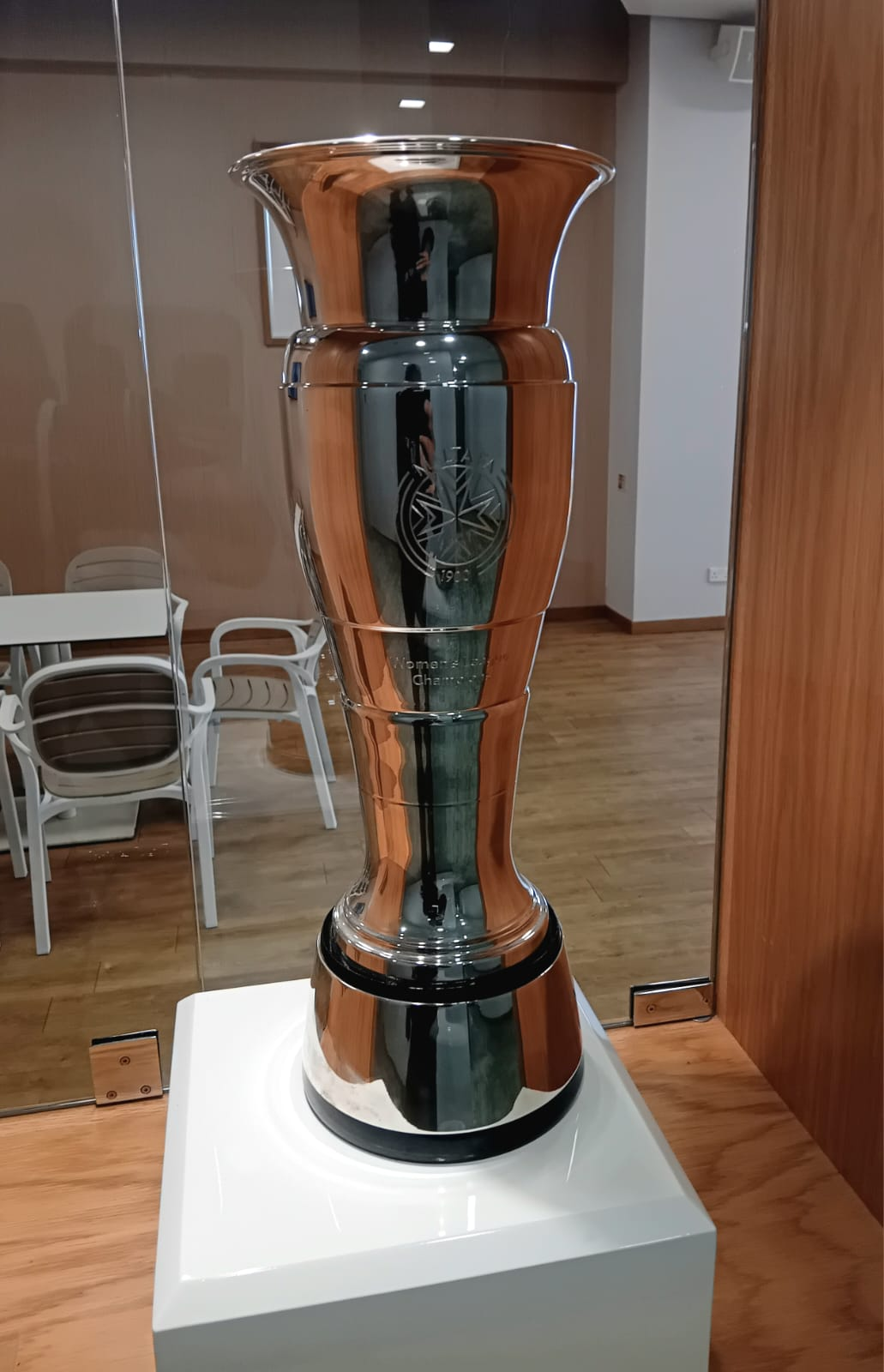
Maltese Women's League trophy

The Maltese Women's League or for sponsorship reasons Assikura Women's League is the top-level league of women's football in Malta. It is run by the Malta Football Association.

After several failed attempts in the 1970s and 1980s to create a lasting women's football competition, successful tournaments of San Gwann and Luxol St. Andrews gained so much interest, that the Malta Football Association decided to organize the first ever league in 1995–96.

Although the winning team of the league qualifies for a spot in the UEFA Women's Champions League, the spot is not always taken. Malta is currently tied for 43rd place out of 50 in the UEFA coefficients women's ranking and the last club to take part was Birkirkara in 2007–08; Birkirkana lost all three games with 1–37 goals. In 09–10 they competed again and ended up with three losses and 1-26 goals.

== Format ==
Location of teams in 2026–27 Maltese Women's League

=== Teams ===
The teams which will participate in the 2025-26 Assikura Women's League are the following:

Team	City	Last season
Birkirkara	Birkirkara	3rd
Hibernians	Paola	4th
Mġarr United	Mgarr	2nd
San Ġwann	San Ġwann	8th
Swieqi United	Swieqi	1st
Valletta	Valletta	6th

=== Venues ===
The 2023-24 season will be played at the following venues:

Venues	City	Capacity
Centenary Stadium	Ta' Qali	3,000
Victor Tedesco Stadium	Hamrun	1,962
Dingli Ground	Dingli	500
Mgarr Ground	Mgarr	200

Until the 2011–12 season there were eight teams in the league. The teams played each other twice for a total of 14 matches each. After that the champion qualifies to the UEFA Champion's League and the last two places are relegated to the Maltese Seceond Division. Since then the format has changed a lot.

In the 2012–13, after the regular season the top four played a championship group and the bottom placed four teams played the relegation round. Points of the regular season and the second stage were added. In 2013–14 there was just one stage, where seven teams played each other three times. Also there was a title decider match after the top two teams were tied on points. Hibernians won the title over Birkirkara in a penalty shootout.

In 2014–15 there were eleven teams, and again a championship group to which the top six after the regular season qualified.

For 2015–16 the league was reduced to six teams. They play each other four times for a total of 20 matches per team.

For the 2023–24 season, the league will be the only division in Malta and will comprise eight clubs. In terms of format, the league will be split into two phases. In the first part of the season, the eight teams of the league will face each other played in a double round-robin format. Thereafter, the division will be split into two divisions, with the top four at the end of the first part of the season qualifying for the Championship Round and the bottom four qualifying for the Relegation Round. In both cases, each team will play each other three teams.

== List of champions ==
The season winners are:

Club	Winners	Winning years
Birkirkara	13	2006-07, 2008-09, 2009-10, 2011-12, 2012-13, 2016-17, 2017-18, 2018-19, 2019-20, 2020-21, 2021-22, 2022-23, 2023-24
Hibernians	12	1998-99, 1999-2000, 2000-01, 2001-02, 2002-03, 2003-04, 2004-05, 2005-06, 2007-08, 2013-14, 2014-15, 2015-16
Rabat Ajax	2	1995-96,1997-98
Lija Athletic	1	1996-97
Mosta	1	2010-11
Swieqi United	1	2024-25
Mġarr United	1	2025-26

Bold teams are currently in the Maltese Women's League.
