= Chapel of Our Lady of Itria =

Chapel in Mġarr, Malta

- Chapel of Our Lady of Hodegetria
- Knisja tal-Madonna ta' Hodegitria
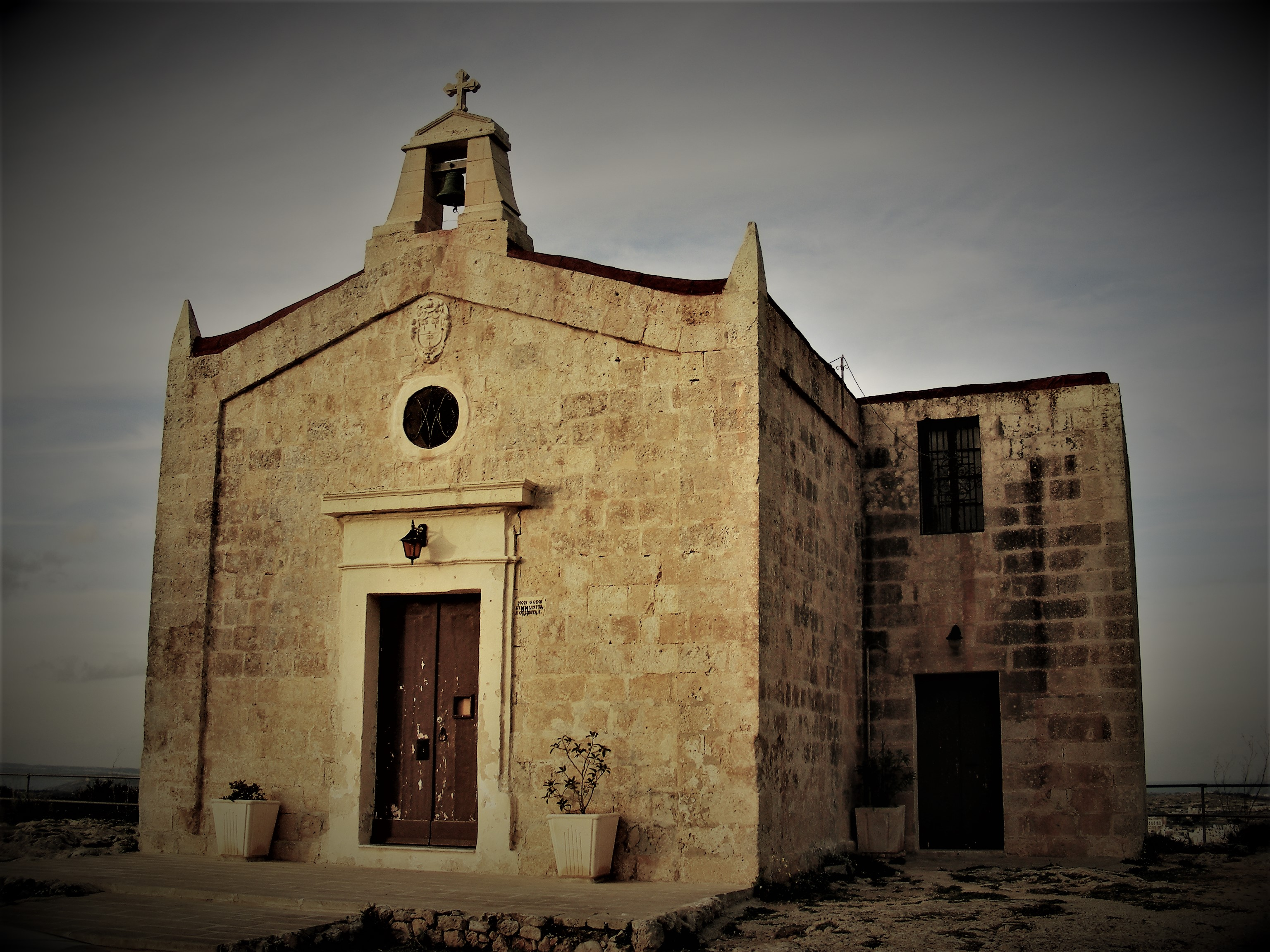
- Facade
- Click on the map for a fullscreen view
- 35°54′12.58″N 14°22′38.62″E
- Location: Triq Binġemma, Mġarr
- Country: Malta
- Language: Maltese
- Denomination: Catholic
- Tradition: Roman Rite
- Religious order: MSSP
- Website: parrocci.knisja.mt/knisja/knisja-tal-madonna-ta-hodegitria-ta-bingemma/

History
- Status: Chapel
- Founded: 1600
- Founder: Giovanni Maria Xara
- Dedication: Mary (as Hodegetria)
- Dedicated: 1600

Architecture
- Completed: 1680

Administration
- Diocese: Malta

The Chapel of Our Lady of Itria, also known as the Church of Our Lady of Hodegetria (Maltese: Knisja tal-Madonna ta’ Hodegitria), is a small Roman Catholic church in the Binġemma area of Mġarr, Malta.

== History ==
Another chapel dedicated to Our Lady of Hodegetria was originally built close by in 1600 by Giovanni Maria Xara, a local land owner. This church building was not maintained properly and in 1658, Bishop Miguel Jerónimo de Molina order it to be desecrated. Xara's nephew, Staninslaw, recovered the stones from this small building in 1680 and started building a slightly larger one a few meters away from the other one. The younger baron and his heirs provided full financial support for all the construction and maintenance of the new building, which is the chapel that has survived to our time. This historical origin story is captured in a marble inscription inside the church itself.

The new chapel retained the original dedication to the Hodegetria, which was a popular title for churches in the sixteenth and seventeenth century, owing to the Basilian Fathers association with the orthodox devotion to the Madonna Odegitria (that is, ‘the Virgin Mary who shows the way’), who also founded a monastic site in southern Italy's Itria Valley.

== Architectural structure ==
The chapel consists of the church, a small sacristy built on the side of the church, and which has a door to the outside, and a small room above the sacristy, which was intended as private quarters for the priest who took charge of the chapel. From the construction materials, including a steel beam, it is evident that the sacristy and the room above it were built some time after the chapel, however, it is not known exactly when this occurred.

The building is situated on the edge of a Binġemma Valley rock cliff, immediately above a Punic tomb. The church is within the proximity of the Victoria Lines.

The church has a small parvise, with four steps in the middle leading to the main entrance. Two small glass windows enable you to see inside the church even when the door is closed. The front and the rest of the building is quite plain. Above the door there is a round window, and above this window is a coat of arms Baron Stanislaw Xara, who built this church. Above the church is a small arched bell tower with a cross on it, and a bronze bell. In the corners of the facade, at the top, there are triangular stone designs that give the chapel its recognizable feature that distinguishes it from an ordinary stone room built in a rural area.

The inside of the building is also quite plain, with one stone altar and a wooden one clearly added in the latter part of the twentieth century. A single large ex-voto painting hangs above the altar. The only other images inside the building are the stations of the cross, which were donated by Countess Marija Antonia Sant through a papal decree on 28 December 1870.

== Administration ==
The church is administered by the Missionary Society of St. Paul, who hold mass there every Sunday morning.
