= San Andrea School =

- Skola San Andrea
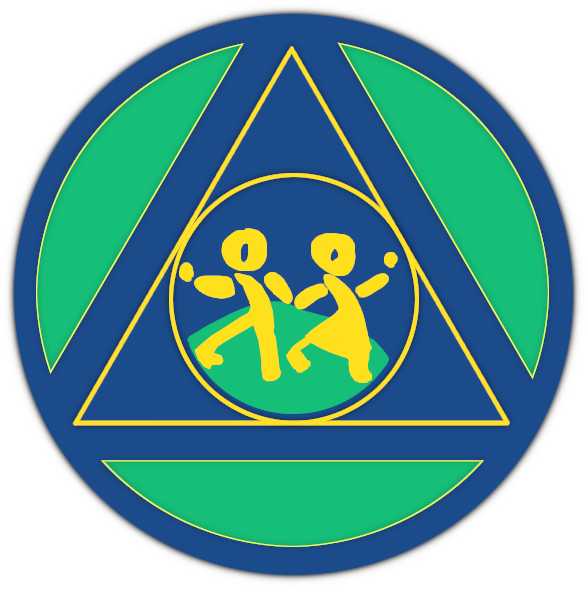

Location
- Mġarr MGR 2850; Malta; 35°54′58″N 14°23′35″E

Information
- School type: Private (Independent) School
- Motto: Reason, Respect and Responsibility
- Religious affiliation: Catholic
- Patron saint: Andrew the Apostle
- Established: 1992
- Founder: The Parents Foundation For Education
- Chairperson: Nicholas Valenzia
- Chaplain: Fr Aayrton Muscat
- Grades: Pre-nursery, nursery, 1-12
- Gender: Coeducational
- Age range: 0 - 16 (17-19 if the students are overage)
- Hours in school day: Lessons start at 8:20 and finish at 14:37
- Houses: Aragon (green), Castille (blue), Auvergne (yellow) and Provence (red)
- Sports: Football, handball, basketball, tennis, and athletics
- Newspaper: Insider
- Website: www.sanandrea.edu.mt

San Andrea School is a private school located in Mġarr, Malta. It was established by the Parents Foundation for Education in 1992, who also founded San Anton School. It is composed of three sectors, each housed in a separate building: Early School, Middle School, and Senior School. San Andrea does not offer sixth form education.

== College of Heads ==
Sources:

- Director of Education - Mr Stephen Briffa
- Head of Early and Middle Sector - Ms Johanna Gatt
- Head of Senior Sector - Mr Christopher Schembri

== Year Group Nomenclature ==
San Andrea School uses a grade-level numbering system that is offset by one year compared to Maltese state schools (for example, Year 10 in state schools corresponds to Grade 11 at San Andrea).

Year Groups
Grade	Form	Building
Pre-nursery		Early School
Nursery		Early School
Grade 1		Early School
Grade 2		Early School
Grade 3		Early School
Grade 4		Middle School
Grade 5		Middle School
Grade 6		Middle School
Grade 7		Middle School
Grade 8	Form 1	Senior School
Grade 9	Form 2	Senior School
Grade 10	Form 3	Senior School
Grade 11	Form 4	Senior School
Grade 12	Form 5	Senior School

== Extra-Curricular Programme ==
The school offers a variety of extra-curricular options, including:

- Crafty Kids Club
- Gymnastics
- Art Attack!
- Handball
- Cathecism
- Homework Club
- Basketball
- STEM Challenges!
- FUNdamental Football
- Ballet
- Maltese Conversation Classes
- Swimming
- Stage Coach
- Athletics
- Grate Cooking Club
- Musical Theatre

== Inquiry concludes that 2022 fraud allegations were not substantiated ==
In October 2022, a senior educator at the school went public with a series of fraud allegations and resigned his role at the school. These allegations were highly publicized in the Maltese media and resulted in an inquiry carried out by Emeritus Judge David Scicluna, the conclusions of which were published by the school in June 2023. The 73-page inquiry concluded that the allegations of fraud had not been substantiated. The school promised to investigate past inconsistencies in financial management, ensure proper accounting practices were in place, and determine whether there was scope for legal action.

Regarding claims that the resigned educator had been bullied when he spoke out about financial irregularities, Judge Scicluna stated in the inquiry report: “The series of emails written to (the assistant head) requesting him to put down his allegations in writing cannot by any stretch of the imagination be considered as persecution or intimidation. It was a (school) Board carrying out its duty.”

The inquiry also concluded, however, that there was a culture of bullying and arrogance among some members of staff at the school - by which point a head and an assistant head had resigned, another assistant head was suspended, and the principal had suspended herself.

The judge also urged the school to strengthen its communications, register financial donations of a certain amount, and issue receipts on expenditure.

As a result of the inquiry, the school board established an independent committee and a number of changes were implemented.
