= Mselliet =

Coordinates: 35°55′01″N 14°23′41″E

Mselliet (Maltese: L-Imselliet) is an area in northern Malta, lying within the limits of Mġarr and St. Paul's Bay. It is primarily made up of agricultural land, and it has Mselliet Valley (Maltese: Il-Wied tal-Imselliet).

Mselliet houses Malta's largest solar farm, which was inaugurated in July 2020. The solar farm includes 16,869 photovoltaic panels and generates enough energy to power 2,200 homes.
