= Savio College =

Location
- Triq il-Buskett; Dingli; Malta
- 35.8597°N 14.3866°E

Information
- Type: Secondary School
- Motto: "Education is a matter of the heart"
- Religious affiliation: Roman Catholic
- Established: 1968; 58 years ago
- Administrator: Carmelo Said
- Rector: Carmelo Said
- Headmaster: Jake Mamo
- Staff: ~100
- Gender: Boys
- Age: 11 to 16
- Enrolment: ~260
- Classes: 10
- Houses: 2 (Greens and Yellows)
- Colours: Green and yellow
- Athletics conference: Savio Athletics Club
- Website: www.saviocollege.edu.mt

Savio College is a boys' secondary church school run by the Salesians of Don Bosco in the west of Malta, in the village of Ħad-Dingli. The school is named after one of Don Bosco's students, St. Dominic Savio.

Founded in 1968, Savio College is a Salesian Catholic school founded on the educational philosophy of St. John Bosco. It is a secondary school for boys situated in the midst of the countryside outside of Dingli, Malta. The college has a vast academic curriculum enhanced by a number to extracurricular activities. The college caters for 260 students, supported and guided to develop and grow in all spheres of their life, be it academically, physically, spiritually, emotionally and socially.

== Founding ==
Works on a large house in Ħad-Dingli intended for the fostering and formation of religious vocations began on February 5, 1965. The land in Dingli was provided by Sliema resident Miss Maude Bugeja and Joseph Mangion was put in charge of construction. The construction of the school received financial support from the United States' Mission Office.

On June 20, archbishop Michael Gonzi blessed the foundation stone. It opened its doors three years later and welcomed its first group of 12 students. Some of these students had come from the summer camps at the Salesian Oratory in Sliema.

== School complex ==
The school complex is divided into 2 sections: the main school building and the sports complex. Since 2015, the school went through a significant facelift with new electrical and water systems, new furniture, new windows and new technology.

=== Main building ===
The main building, in which most classes take place and students spend most of their time houses the live-in areas, a small inner hall & and a chapel. It is also equipped with science laboratories for physics, chemistry, and biology as well as two computer labs.

=== Sports complex ===
The Sports Complex consists of two areas: the indoor gym and the outdoor sporting area.

==== Indoor gym ====
The indoor area houses the gym is also used as a hall for large ceremonies and a 'games room' equipped with snooker tables, table soccer (foosball) tables and ping pong tables. The games room is primarily used by students who arrive early and during recess when they are unable to go outside due to bad weather.

== After-school activities ==
Apart from usual school activities, Savio College runs an athletics club formally known as Savio Athletics which hosts a number of inner sporting activities and also takes part in national sporting tournaments and leagues.

The school also offers a robotics club which actively participates in international robotics competitions and has an active presence in the Malta Robotics Olympiad.

A school council made up of students help raise funds for school-wide activities, organize social events and plan community projects. The school council also helps raise environmental awareness in collaboration with the EkoSkola Committee.

The EkoSkola Committee acts as a branch of the school council, often made up of students who are also in the school council. Its main task is to make the school greener by reducing carbon emissions and waste, while also pushing towards more environmentally-friendly upgrades to the school.
