= San Anton School =

Private school in Malta

Logo

San Anton School is a private co-educational school located in Mselliet, near Mġarr, Malta. The school was founded in 1988 in the village of Attard, close to the President's San Anton Palace, giving the school its name.

== Headmaster ==
The current acting principal is Bernardette Stivala following the death of headmaster Sandro Spiteri. He was appointed as headmaster in June 2020, and died in December 2021.
