= Education in Malta =

The University of Malta main entrance, seen in 2026

Education in Malta is compulsory through age sixteen and is offered through three different providers: the state, the church, and the private sector. The state is responsible for promoting education and instruction, ensuring universal access to education for all Maltese citizens and the existence of a system of schools and institutions accessible to all Maltese citizens. The objectives of education in Malta include intellectual and moral development and the preparation of every citizen to contribute productively to the national economy. The arrival of a number of religious orders in the Middle Ages brought religious-based education to the island for wealthy families. The arrival of the Knights Hospitaller saw the establishment of the University of Malta, around which a number of primary, secondary and post-secondary institutions were established. Education in Malta has been universally available at the primary level since the ejection of the Knights Hospitaller by the French in 1798, when state-funded elementary schooling was established. In 1878, English replaced Italian as the primary language of instruction, and education was made compulsory in 1946 in response to a number of children not attending school due to poverty between World Wars One and Two. The age at which education became compulsory was lowered to five years in 1988.

Malta's educational system is divided into four stages: pre-primary (ages 3–5), primary (ages 5–11), secondary (ages 11–16) and tertiary. Pre-primary education is optional but fully funded by the state. In their last ten years of primary education, students are placed on tracks based on educational attainment, and at the age of eleven, students sit an eleven plus examination to eliminate a student's secondary schooling direction. Success in the eleven plus exam places a student in a junior lyceum - a prestigious secondary school - while mediocre performance or not sitting the examination places a student in a less competitive secondary school. Secondary Education Certificate (SEC) examinations are taken at age 16, and matriculation examinations are taken at age 18 to determine university entrance eligibility. In 2008, 26,711 primary students, 25,793 secondary students, 5,719 post-secondary students, 9,472 tertiary students and 6,268 vocational students were enrolled in educational courses in Malta. Approximately 30 per cent of Malta's primary and secondary school students are enrolled in private schools, most of which are operated by the Catholic Church. Malta's highest post-secondary institution is the University of Malta, which has operated since 1552.

== History ==
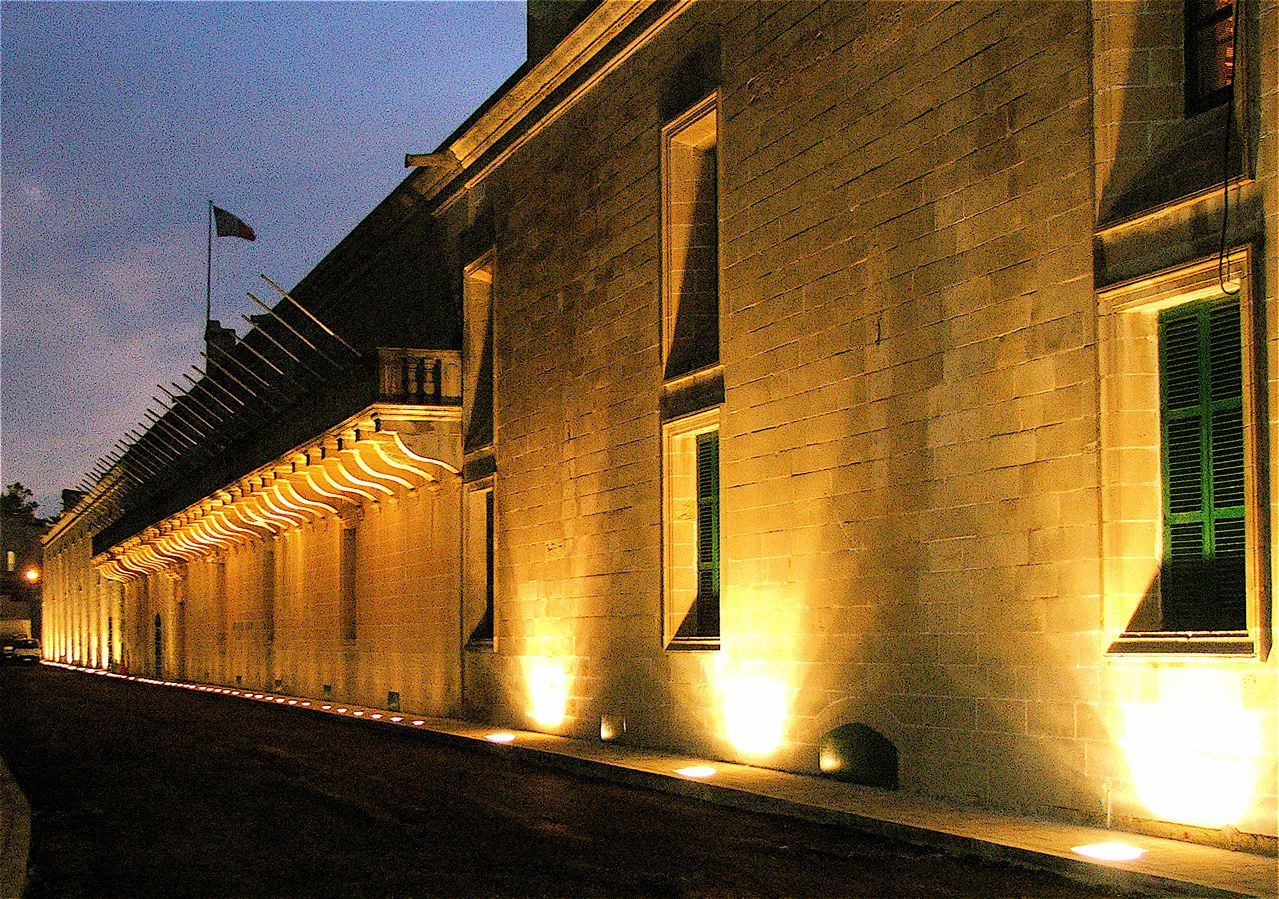
The historic Sacra Infermeria hospital, original site of the medieval University of Malta's medical school, now operates as the Mediterranean Conference Center.

The period of Arab rule between 870 and 1090 brought what would become the Maltese language. The arrival of the Franciscans in 1350, the Carmelites in 1418, the Dominican Order in 1450, the Augustinians in 1460 and the Friars Minor in 1492 brought religious-based education to the island. Members of these groups were asked to serve as private tutors for the children of wealthy parents, and later moved to set up classes for instruction in Italian, Latin and numeracy. In 1592, the Collegium Melitense (what was to become the University of Malta) was established by the Society of Jesus as a result of a direct order from Pope Clement VIII, and around this institution a number of others flourished, including a grammar school, a preparatory school and institutions for the study of cartography, naval architecture and navigation. In addition to public options, it was possible to hire private tutors in a number of different areas, including accounting, philosophy, navigation and languages. During this period, however, education for those without wealth was non-existent. During the 16th century, philosophy, theology, grammar and the humanities were taught at the Collegium, and following Europe's temporary recovery from the Black Death in 1675, the Grand Master of the Knights Hospitaller appointed a new lecturer in anatomy and surgery at Sacra Infermeria, essentially establishing the University of Malta's medical school. The Roman Catholic Church, however, was against educating the lower classes and focused on those who afforded to pay. This resulted in mass illiteracy by the end of the Order of St John and took until the second half of the 19th century, under British rule, to have a sprint towards further inclusion.

The ejection of the Knights Hospitaller by the French Republic in 1798 brought a reformation of the educational system with it due to the disparity between the traditional ideals of the Knights and the revolutionary ideals of the French. Private schooling was banned, elementary schooling was introduced and funded by the state, and adult education was introduced. The gradual introduction of universal education for primary school students was an ideal born before and during the French Revolution, while private schools were abolished due to their traditional association with the Catholic Church, an institution rejected by those involved in the Revolution. In addition, Napoleon I abolished the University of Malta just five days after his ejection of the Knights, although this decision was reversed after the British ejected the French the following year. In 1799, Malta fell under the jurisdiction of the United Kingdom, and attempts were made to adjust Malta's institutions towards a British style.

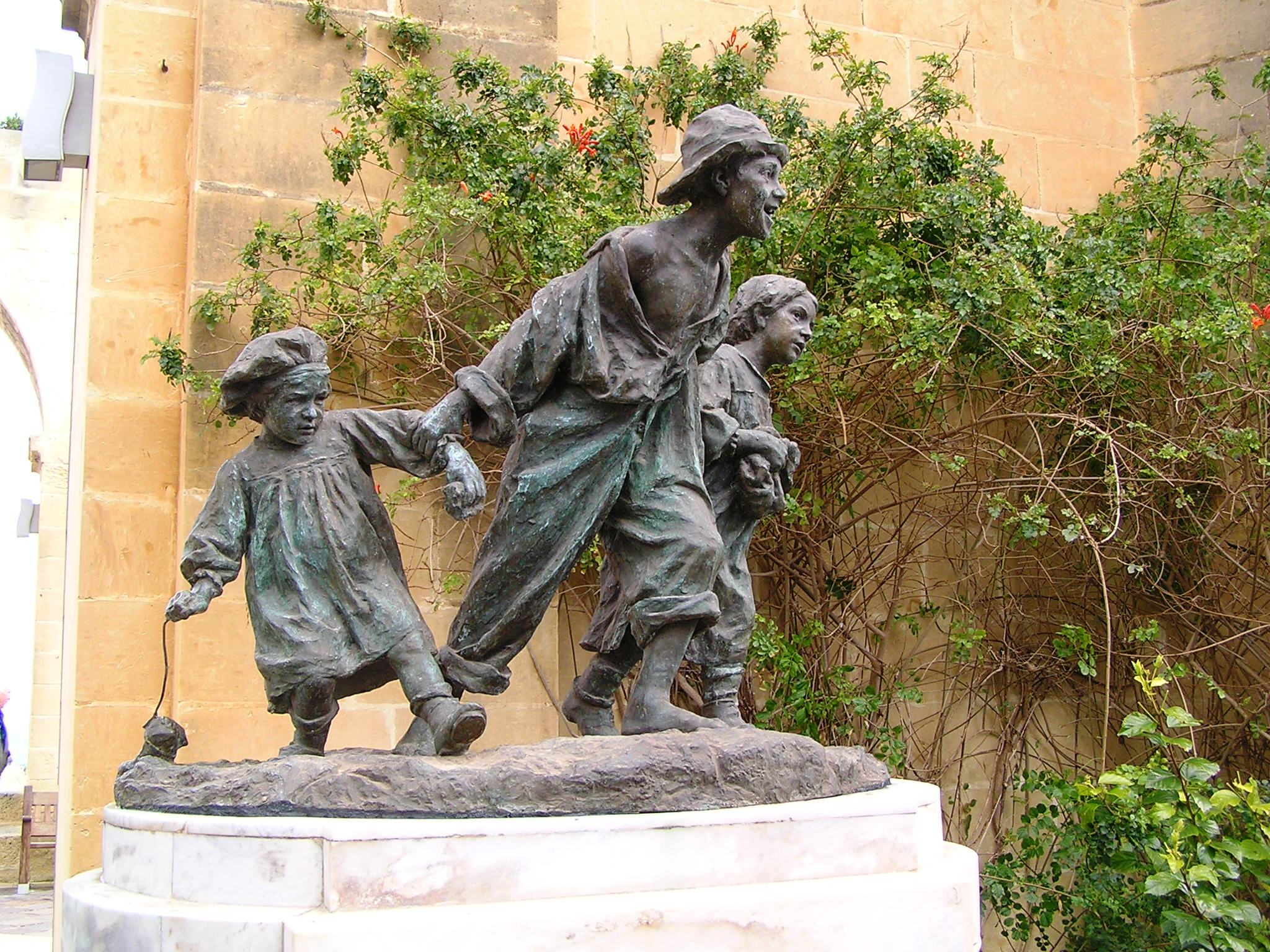
This 1903 sculpture in Valletta's Upper Barrakka Gardens, "Les Gavroches" by Maltese artist Antonio Sciortino, depicts the poverty children experienced in Malta in the early 20th century.

Under Government Ponsonby, in 1833, the Catholic Church in Malta was staunchly against public education; the only effort done by the priesthood is to demand people not to accept education or be condemned by excommunication, together with other religious consequences. Focus on religious teaching, at the exclusion of important matters, left over 97% of the country illiterate. The role of Canon Fortunato Panzavecchia as Director of Schools proved him to be unworthy and stubborn of progress. He even fabricated irrelevant religious-related documents about supposed improvements. The British observed that the Director was more interested in the failure of educating the common people and was unfit for purpose. In 1847, elementary schooling was changed to the British model, schools were opened in every village and education was made free of charge. In 1878, the mode of language education delivery changed following the publication of two reports on the matter. Italian language education was replaced by instruction in the English language, and the use of Maltese was encouraged in the primary years. However, English was the language in which education was delivered at all stages of education following primary school. Debate continued until the 1930s over which language should be used in Maltese education - Italian or English.

During World War I, the interwar years and World War II, widespread poverty in Malta prevented the children of the lower classes from pursuing basic education in favor of staying home to assist parents with agricultural work and other income earning activities. To counteract this phenomenon, on 1 February 1946 education was declared compulsory till the age of 14. In 1964, Malta became an independent nation, and in 1988 a new Education Act was passed, lowering the compulsory education age to five years, decentralising educational decision making and establishing a right for any person to apply for a licence to open a school. The Faculty of Arts, Sciences and Theology at the University of Malta was also reinstated.

== Statistics ==
In 2008, 26,711 primary students, 25,793 secondary students, 5,719 post-secondary students, 9,472 tertiary students and 6,268 vocational students were enrolled in educational courses in Malta. Approximately 30 per cent of students of school age attend private schools, most of which are operated by the Catholic Church. In 2009, 34.9 per cent of the population between 18 and 24 years of age had not completed secondary school, while in 2008 92 per cent of the population was considered literate. Malta ranks equal eleventh in the world on the national IQ scale.

The compulsory education period in Malta has been between five and 16 years of age since the introduction of the Education Act 1988. This is an increase from up to 12 years of age in 1924 (in this year, school attendance became compulsory for those already enrolled - the act of enrollment itself was not compulsory) and 14 years of age in 1946, when compulsory school attendance was introduced for all students, enrolled or otherwise. Compulsory schooling has always applied to both males and females during its existence.

== Structure ==
=== School education ===
Schooling is compulsory from the age of five, although free-of-charge kindergarten is available to all students beginning at age three. Approximately 94 per cent of three- and four-year-olds attend kindergarten. A number of private operators exist, but free state-run institutions are also popular. State-run Maltese kindergartens are required to have one staff member present for every ten children present, while this ratio decreases to 1:20 for independently run institutions. During the kindergarten years, the focus is on play, not formal education. From kindergarten, students transition to primary school, which is compulsory from the age of five. Since 1980, all state-run primary schools have been co-educational, with many independent schools following suit. However, church-run primary schools are usually single-sex. Classes usually have a limit of thirty students, and a minimum teacher to student ratio has been set at 1:19 in all schools, whether they be state-run, church-run or independent.

De La Salle College in Bormla, which hosts primary, secondary, and sixth form students

Formal end-of-year examinations commence starting in Year 4 to dictate class streaming arrangements for the following year. Students are examined in English, Maltese, mathematics, religion and social studies. Despite the fact that eleven-plus examinations highlight inequality and failures, and are recognized as ineffective educational tools by experts, Malta still implements such exams. In Year 6, when most pupils have turned eleven years of age, an eleven-plus exam is given to students to determine which students attend which secondary schools. Students are tested in English language, Maltese language, mathematics, social studies and religion; the latter is optional for those not adhering to the faith taught in schools. While 73 per cent of eleven-year-old students sat the eleven-plus exam in 2001, only about 54 percent pass it each year. Students achieving success in the eleven-plus exam go on to attend prestigious 'junior lyceums' during their secondary years, whilst those who do not attend 'area secondary schools'. This is similar to the operation of the Tripartite System in the United Kingdom following World War II.

State-run junior lyceums and area secondary schools are single-sex. Junior lyceums are divided into two grade stages. The first stage is an introductory stage, and runs for the first two years of secondary schooling. Students study essentially the same subjects with very limited curriculum options in order to provide a good grounding for future studies. Following the two-year introductory cycle, a three-year specialist stage occurs during which students study a common core curriculum as well as a number of elective subjects. This orientation is similar at area secondary schools, although the introductory period is longer, at three years in duration, and the final specialist period is shorter, at two years. The staff-student ratio is set at 1:11, and the school leaving age is 16.

Examinations in Maltese secondary schools are taken at both age 16 and 18, with the latter being a final optional set of matriculation examinations. The examinations taken at age 16 are the Secondary Education Certificate (SEC) exams, which have operated since 1994, before which the GCE Ordinary Level was used as a secondary certificate examination. The examinations taken at 18, those enabling entry into university, are the Matriculation Certificate examinations, based on the International Baccalaureate. These examinations replaced the GCE Advanced Levels.

=== Day-to-day operation ===
A number of students travel to school using the nation's bus network, which is free for state school students to use. Schools in Malta generally begin their school day at 8:30am and finish at 2:40pm. Students receive three days of holidays in November 15 days of holidays over Christmas, two days of holidays in March and eight days of holidays in April, in addition to public holidays. Maltese school students receive the highest number of days off of all school students in Europe, with 90 days during the 2010–11 academic year being non-school days. This is 14 days more than the European average of 76. Virtually all Maltese state schools run tuck shops, while some secondary schools are home to cafeterias.

State schools provide textbooks free of charge to their students, while private schools generally require their students to pay for their textbooks, enabling the latter to change their textbooks and textbook editions more frequently. All primary schools have at least four computers, one printer, a large monitor and a teacher's laptop computer in their classrooms, while many secondary schools have specialised rooms necessary to teach subjects such as Home Economics and Food Technology. An average of 22.5 students are enrolled per primary school class, with the average rising to 24.3 in secondary school classes. Primary school teachers are expected to dedicate five hours per week to each of Maltese, English and mathematics, one hour per week to science, two hours per weeks to arts and crafts, two hours per week to social studies, one hour and 15 minutes per week to social studies, and two and a half hours per week to physical education and religion. State school syllabi at the secondary level are set by the local examination bodies.

=== Tertiary education ===
Under the Education Act of 1988, the Government of Malta is obligated to provide free university education to eligible residents with sufficient qualifications for entry. However, due to funding constraints, the University of Malta offers some courses only every other year in order to maximise course offerings with optimum funding usage. 10,000 students currently study at the university. Most Bachelor degree courses run for three years.

== Educational management ==
=== Administration ===
State-run education in Malta is administered at the national level of government, with the Minister for Education empowered to make orders, or 'Legal Notices', relating to the administration of education throughout the country. The Minister for Education is appointed by the President on advice of the Prime Minister and is responsible for a number of education-related government functions (such as the operation of schools and libraries) as well as tertiary education in the country. The Ministry of Education, the national government department responsible for education in Malta, is headed by a Permanent Secretary. The Education Division of the Ministry is responsible for setting a number of annual nationwide examinations, managing human resources in Malta's educational system, selecting school textbook lists, allocating students to schools based on area, managing the Ministry's educational finances and promoting a number of cultural, sporting and social activities. Malta's Ministry of Education is currently being decentralised with the aim of having schools managed at the local level.

With the exception of the currently occurring educational management decentralisation process, regional administration of education in Malta is limited. However, the island of Gozo does maintain a form of regional educational administration through the Ministry for Gozo. Although the Ministry for Education manages education throughout Malta, the Ministry for Gozo is responsible for the remuneration of the island's teaching staff. Local authorities such as Malta's numerous Local Councils have no official ties to Malta's educational system but often donate to local schools and maintain preschool building structures.

=== Teacher development ===
Primary and secondary school teachers begin their teacher education at the University of Malta by gaining a Bachelor of Education (Honours), which typically takes four years of study to achieve. To gain entry into the university to study primary or secondary education, students must not only meet the university's general entry requirements but also a number of other special course requirements. University students seeking to enter the teaching profession may also become qualified by gaining a postgraduate certificate in education. Two years of professional teaching practice is also generally required. The Minister for Education may also grant a temporary warrant to teach, valid for one year, to any person the Minister believes has the ability to teach in the country.

In 2019, teachers entering the workforce are paid a minimum of €23,936 per year, with the most experienced teachers being paid €27,340 per year after 18 years of service. Heads of School received a minimum of €27,707.00 per year. In 2005–06, there were 8,217 teaching staff in Malta, of which 7,988 worked at state schools (Including the University of Malta, MCAST and Ġ. F. Abela Junior College).

== See also ==
- List of schools in Malta
- List of public libraries in Malta
