= Maltese Women's Cup =

Tazza Nazzjonali tan-Nisa
- Founded: 1995
- Region: Malta
- Teams: 8 (2018–19)
- Current champions: Birkirkara (15th title)
- Most championships: Birkirkara (15 titles)

The Maltese Women's Knock-Out is the annual cup competition for women's football teams in Malta. Established in 1995–96, the competition is organised by the Malta Football Association.

== List of finals ==
Season	Winners	Score	Runners–up
1995–96	Rabat Ajax	3–3; 4–0 (rep.)	Lija Athletic
1996–97	Rabat Ajax	0–0 (a.e.t.); 5–3 (pen.)	Lija Athletic
1997–98	Rabat Ajax	2–0	Mosta
1998–99	Birkirkara	2–1	Mosta
1999–2000	Birkirkara	0–0 (a.e.t.); 4–3 (pen.)	Melita
2000–01	Hibernians	1–0	Birkirkara
2001–02	Birkirkara	1–0	Hibernians
2002–03	Birkirkara	1–0 (a.e.t.)	Hibernians
2003–04	Hibernians	4–2 (a.e.t.)	Birkirkara
2004–05	Birkirkara	8–1	Raiders (Luxol)
2005–06	Hibernians	4–0	Melita
2006–07	Birkirkara	8–0	Sta. Venera Lightnings
2007–08	Birkirkara		
2008–09	Birkirkara		
2009–10	Birkirkara		
2010–11	Birkirkara	3–0	Gozo
2011–12	Mosta	1–1 (a.e.t.); 4–2 (pen.)	Birkirkara
2012–13	Birkirkara	1–1 (a.e.t.); 5–3 (pen.)	Mosta
2013–14	Birkirkara	2–1	Hibernians
2014–15	Hibernians	6–0	Raiders (Luxol)
2015–16	Hibernians	2–0	Raiders (Luxol)
2016–17	Birkirkara	2–0	Kirkop United
2017–18	Birkirkara	1–1 (a.e.t.); 4–3 (pen.)	Mġarr United
2018–19	Birkirkara	2–0	Mġarr United
2019–20	Competition abandoned due to the COVID-19 pandemic		
2020–21	Competition abandoned due to the COVID-19 pandemic		
2021–22	Birkirkara	3–0	Swieqi United
2022–23	Swieqi United	2–1	Hibernians

== Results by team ==
Club	Wins	First final won	Last final won	Runners-up	Last final lost	Total final appearances
Birkirkara	16	1998–99	2021–22	3	2011–12	19
Hibernians	5	2000–01	2015–16	4	2022–23	9
Rabat Ajax	3	1995–96	1997–98	0	—	3
Mosta	1	2011–12	2011–12	3	2012–13	4
Swieqi United	1	2022–23	2022–23	1	2021–22	2
Raiders (Luxol)	0	—	—	3	2015–16	3
Lija Athletic	0	—	—	2	1996–97	2
Melita	0	—	—	2	2005–06	2
Mġarr United	0	—	—	2	2018–19	2
Sta. Venera Lightnings	0	—	—	1	2006–07	1
Gozo	0	—	—	1	2010–11	1
Kirkop United	0	—	—	1	2016–17	1

== See also ==
- Maltese FA Trophy, the men's cup
