= De La Salle College (Malta) =

- The entire premises, seen in 2026

Location
- Bormla / Birgu; Malta; 35°53′03″N 14°31′43″E

Information
- Motto: Latin: Scientia valida fide English: Teaching built on faith
- Religious affiliations: Roman Catholic (Christian Brothers)
- Established: 1903; 123 years ago
- Founders: Institute of the Brothers of the Christian Schools
- Website: lasallemalta.edu.mt/de-la-salle-college/

De La Salle College is a private Catholic boys' school run by the Institute of the Brothers of the Christian Schools in Cospicua, Malta. It was founded by the Christian Brothers in 1903, and was the first school in Malta established by them. The College consists of a primary section, secondary school and a coeducational sixth form.

== History ==
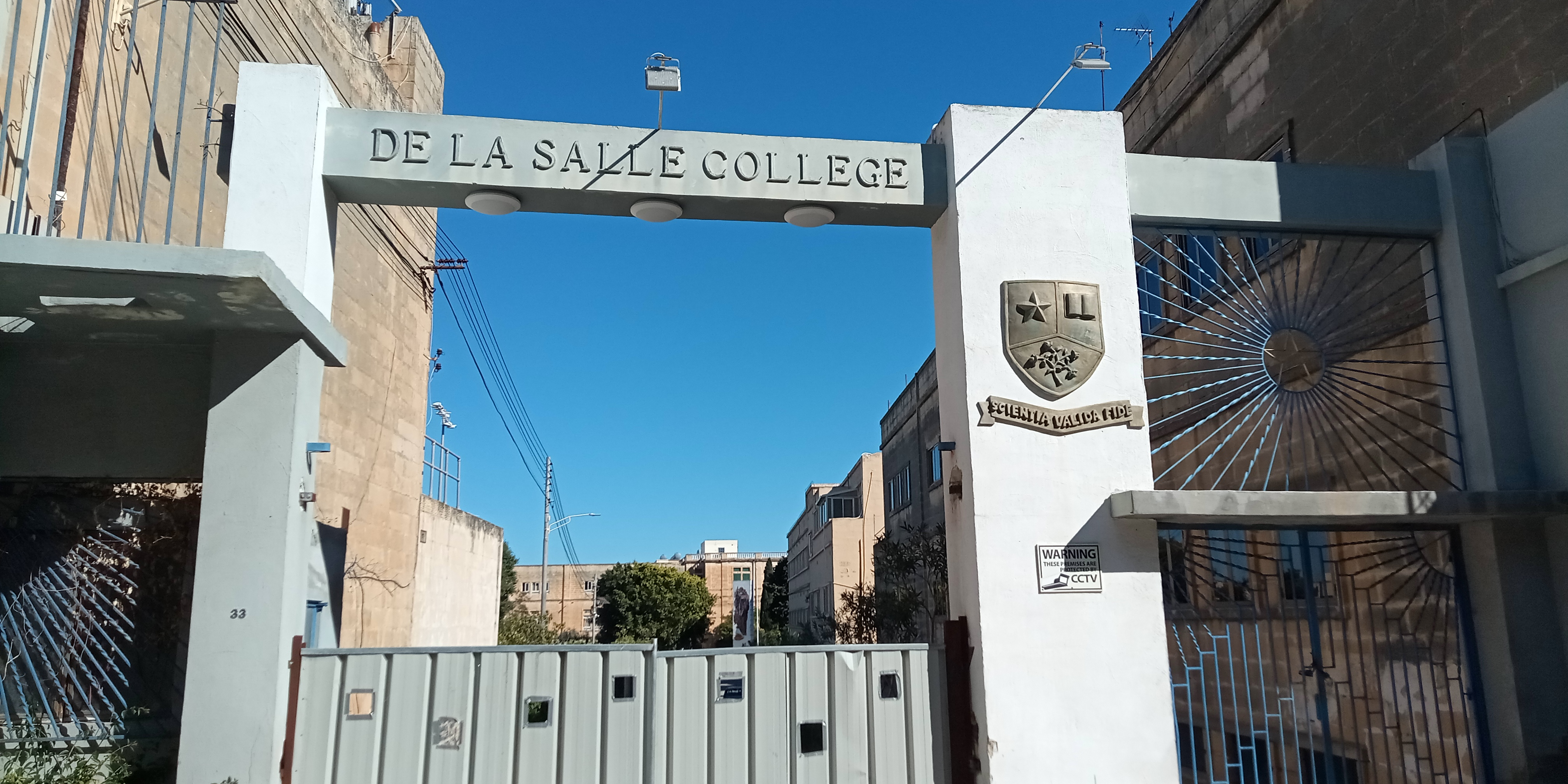
The main entrance to the college

De La Salle College was founded in November 1903 with permission from Sir Charles Clarke, Governor of Malta. The school was closed during the 1910s due to the lack of students but reopened several months later.

The College was not spared during the Siege of Malta in 1940. Due to structural damage to school buildings the Brothers and students stayed with other Catholic communities for the duration of the war. In 1961, boarding was introduced and the school magazine Lasallian was first published. A sixth form was opened in 1966 as a joint venture between the College and fellow Lasallian school Stella Maris College in Gżira. Due to a dispute between church and educational authorities, the college was closed for part of the 1983-84 academic year. Girls have been admitted to the sixth form since the 1970s.

== Achievements ==
De La Salle College established a name for itself in the field of sports and physical education. Many former students went on to represent their country in football, handball, water-polo, athletics, tennis, squash, badminton, basketball, hockey, sailing, karate and others. In inter-college sports, De La Salle is prominent. The college built the first full-sized sports hall in Malta, which became the venue for various sports associations to hold their national competitions. Outdoor playing fields for various sports form an integral part of the school premises.

== The De La Salle monument ==
In 1951, the 1,500 schools and colleges of the De La Salle Order celebrated the third centenary of the birth of St. John Baptist de la Salle. The students who at De La Salle College were preparing to enter H.M. Dockyard, Malta, resolved to donate their first weekly salary towards the erection of a statue of the saint in the event of their being successful at the very competitive Dockyard Entrance Examination. The proposal met with general approval and thus it was that from 1951 to 1959, successive groups of candidates contributed the grand sum of Lm 874, 17s, 8d to a special fund.

The monument stands on a circular base 24 ft in diameter in the centre of which rise a 35 ft. concrete column 8 ft wide and 3 ft.4 ins thick. The face looking towards the College Drive represents the Founder of the Brothers with on his right hand two teenage apprentices surrounded by the tools of their trade. The whole scene is made up of 100,000 pieces of mosaic of 120 colours blended together. On the opposite side of the monument, an inscription in bronze reads:

“TO HONOUR ST JOHN BAPTIST DE LA SALLE
COLLEGE STUDENTS DOCKYARD APPRENTICES 1951 – 1959”

The monument was unveiled on Friday, 26 May 1967 by Charles Henry, Superior General, and blessed by Archbishop Mikiel Gonzi.

To commemorate the erection of this monument, the Former Students’ Association organises each year several religious and sport activities.

== The college badge ==
After the Second World War, the brothers and their staff wished to adopt a uniform and a badge or coat-of-arms for their students.

Some wanted a green blazer and grey trousers, but the majority preferred a dark blue blazer. As for the tie, Bro. Dominic's (director ’49-’55) choice of a tie with a red background and narrow blue stripes obtained wide approval and was adopted.

When the time came to design the badge, suggestions were plentiful. The first was Bro. Victor's who suggested the inclusion of a STAR and a COTTON BRANCH separated diagonally by two fields one RED and the other BLUE, these being the colours of our college. But we also wanted to include some symbol of our profession as teachers, so AN OPEN BOOK was added. In this way, after more discussions on the subject, all agreed that the badge should be as it is today.

To be on the safe side, however, we sent the proposed badge to the U.K. To seek the views of persons well versed in the rules of heraldry and, having received from them a favourable reply, we went ahead with our project. The badge was originally a painting of Dillon Grima.

Why did we agree on this type of badge? Principally, because we wanted a badge that would be truly representative of what this lasallian college stands for. That is why we chose: A STAR which symbolizes the FAITH (Religion) and is present in the coat-of-arms of the Institute. An OPEN BOOK which symbolizes learning. A COTTON BRANCH which forms part of the coat-of-arms of Grand Master Cotoner with whom the Cottonera area fortified by him and, on which the college is situated, is closely connected.

As for the MOTTO, after we had been through long lists of possible ones, that submitted by Bro. Dominic: SCIENTIA VALIDA FIDE = TEACHING BUILT ON FAITH, found favour, for it coincided with our Ideals as Brothers of the Christian Schools.

The first time our College Badge was seen in public, its originality and design drew much admiration. Let us hope it will continue to embellish the uniforms of the hundreds of students who are attending and will attend De La Salle College in the years to come.

Brother Henry
