= Mġarr =

Mġarr L-Imġarr
- Local council (Kunsill Lokali)
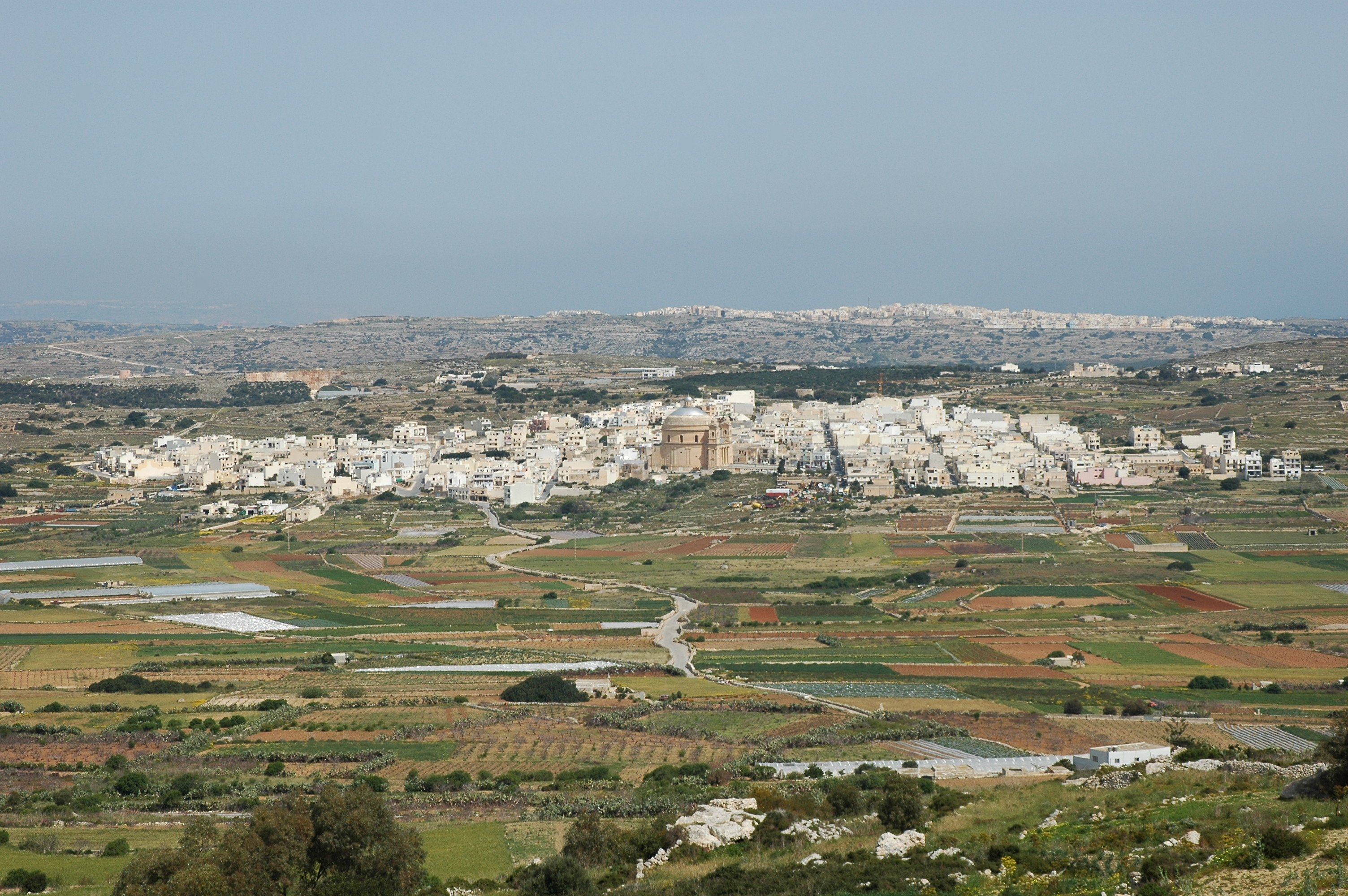
- View of Mġarr

- Flag Coat of arms
- Motto: Raħal żgħir b'qalb kbira (A small town with a caring heart)
- Coordinates: 35°55′11″N 14°21′59″E
- Country: Malta
- Region: Northern Region
- District: Northern District
- Borders: Mellieħa, Mosta, Rabat, St. Paul's Bay

Government
  - Mayor: Paul Vella (PN)

Area
  - Total: 16.1 km^{2} (6.2 sq mi)

Population (Jul 2024)
  - Total: 5,336
  - Density: 331/km^{2} (858/sq mi)
- Demonym(s): Mġarri (m), Mġarrija (f), Mġarrin (pl)
- Time zone: UTC+1 (CET)
  - Summer (DST): UTC+2 (CEST)
- Postal code: MGR
- Dialing code: 356
- ISO 3166 code: MT-31
- Patron saint: Santa Marija
- Day of festa: 1st Sunday after 15 August
- Website: Old Official website Local Council Website

Mġarr (Maltese: L-Imġarr), formerly known as Mgiarro, is a village in the Northern Region of Malta. Mġarr is a rural village, isolated from nearby towns and cities. Mġarr lies west of Mosta and is surrounded by farmland and vineyards. Many of the Imġarrin are farmers or otherwise engaged in agricultural activity. The population of Mġarr was 5,336 in July 2024. This included 2,798 males and 2,538 females; 4,518 Maltese nationals and 818 foreign nationals.

== History ==
=== Prehistory ===
The Ta' Skorba Temples are the earliest remains of human occupation in Mġarr, dating back to the Neolithic Għar Dalam phase of Maltese Prehistory. It is believed that they settled in Mġarr because of the fields, hills and water streams. Skorba was excavated in the early 1960s.

The Ta' Ħaġrat Temples was built in two phases. The minor Saflieni Phase temple can be entered from the major temple, and was built by smaller rocks. The Ġgantija Phase temple consisted of the rest of the temple, including the majestic entrance. These temples were discovered in 1917 and excavated between 1923 and 1926 by Sir Temi Zammit. The site was again excavated in 1954 and in 1961.

=== Punic and Roman Rule ===
Punic Tombs are found scattered around Mġarr, including in Abbatija and near Skorba. These prove that human occupation in Mġarr lasted till around the last century BC. Around 33 Punic Tombs have been found in Mġarr.

The Binġemma Tombs, known as Għerien il-Lhud (English: Jewish Caves) are dug into the Dwejra Hill. These have suffered considerable damage since the cave was used as a dwelling, to house animals and as a war shelter. There are various speculations about what these tombs were for. The Catacombs in Tar-Ragħad show the standing of early Roman Catholics in Malta.

The Roman Villa in Ras ir-Raħeb was apparently used as a site for sacred rites. The Għajn Tuffieħa Roman Baths nearby were erected approximately during the 1st or 2nd century AD. Various rooms including for hot baths, cold baths and relaxation were found. Rooms seem to have been added to be used for recreation.

From the 4th century onwards, there is no concrete proof of what happened in the Mġarr area. During the Arab period, it can only be assumed that small settlements might have persisted in areas like tan-Nadur, ta' Binġemma and tas-Santi, since they were concealed by the hills.

=== Norman and Hospitaller Rule ===
Once the Normans conquered Malta and gradually gained full control of it, commerce in the Fomm ir-Riħ, Ġnejna, and Għajn Tuffieħa ports rose. Cotton, cumin and vineyards were also grown to generate income. Ever since 1419, watchmen were assigned to ensure that products were not stolen or looted. Parts of Binġemma and Santi during these times were sold as feudal lands.

Mġarr also played a role in the Great Siege of Malta. The Ottoman invading army, led by Mustafa Pasha anchored their ships in Mġarr. Men from Mġarr also formed part of the Naxxar Dejma Company.

== Churches ==
=== Assumption of the Blessed Virgin Mary Parish Church ===
One of the earliest mentions of the chapel predating the Parish Church that is standing today was in the Rollo of 1436. The Church used to fall under various parishes, including Mdina, Naxxar and Mellieħa. It is understood that the chapel had been standing since the 1400s, and had major renovations in the 1600s to avoid it collapsing. However in 1918 the chapel was demolished and the Parish Church still standing today was built in its place.

Mġarr and its surrounding zones became an autonomus Parish in 1898, when the population was around 581 and was rising steadily. This led to the Parish Priest and the parishioners wishing to erect a larger church than the one currently present. Work on the new Parish Church started in 1905. Its construction depended heavily on voluntary work and the generous contributions obtained by parishioners from the sale of agricultural products. Despite efforts to speed up the work, the church was not completed until 1946. The Church was completely finished and consecrated in 1948, due to interruptions because of the Second World War, amongst others.

The church is situated on elevated ground, offering a panoramic view of the surrounding fields and hills. Numerous houses still encompass the narrow streets surrounding the church, keeping the traditional feel of the church being the most imposing building of the town centre. This can especially be seen from the Binġemma area, where the church can be easily seen as the largest building in central Mġarr.

=== Defunct Chapels ===
- St Mary Chapel, Żebbiegħ
- St Peter Chapel, Binġemma
- St Michael Archangel, Binġemma
- Tas-Santi Chapel, Santi

== Education ==
=== Saint Nicholas College, Mġarr Primary School ===
The Mġarr Primary School was opened on 19 September 1923. Prior to its opening, only 1% of the population were literate in English and/or Italian, and only 4% were literate in Maltese. Fr Edgar Salomone worked hard and managed to influence the members of the newly elected Self Government in favour of the primary school. In 1946, Mġarr had the highest rate of school attendance nationally.

Eventually, the school expanded and built new classes to accommodate the growth in the student population. It also joined the Saint Nicholas College network of schools.

=== San Andrea School ===
San Andrea School is a private school located in Mġarr. The school was founded in 1992 in Naxxar. It was founded by the Parents Foundation of Education, who also founded San Anton School.

=== San Anton School ===
San Anton School is a private school located in Mġarr. The school was founded in 1988 in the village of Attard, close to the President's San Anton Palace, giving the school its name.

== Local Groups ==
=== Mġarr United Football Club ===
Mġarr United F.C. was founded in 1967 after the disillusion of Mġarr Eagles F.C. The Club has had its fair share of successes, and is active in both training its club members and playing matches.

=== Soċjetà Filarmonika Marija Mtellgħa s-Sema' L-Imġarr ===
The Santa Marija Mtellgħa s-Sema' Philharmonic Society was founded in October 2011. Preparations for the foundation of the band started before the 2011 Festa.

Apart from the Village Festa, the band also played during the possession ceremony of Mons Kalċidon Vassallo and Fr George Schembri as parish priest. The band also played in various local feasts outside of Imġarr. The band was also invited by the Italian Comune of Mathi in 2018, as the band's first service abroad.

=== Soċjetà Spettaklu Marija Assunta Mġarr ===
The Society is responsible for the fireworks and spectacle events during the Village Festa and other events of local importance.

== Government ==
The Mġarr Local Council was established by the Local Government Act of 1993, along with the other local councils of Malta. The first election was held on 22 January 1994. Other elections were held in 1997, 2000, 2003, 2006, 2009, 2013, 2019 and 2024. The present local council was elected in 2024. The local council is housed in a building in Triq Sir Harry Luke.

The current Mġarr Local Council as elected by the residents in the 2024 Maltese local elections

- Paul Vella (Mayor) (PN)
- Wistin Vella (Vice-Mayor) (PN)
- Odette Muscat (PN)
- Charles Said (Minority Leader) (PL)
- Owen Galea (PL)

The following have served as Mayors of Mġarr:

- Victor Camilleri (1994-2000) (PN)
- Paul Vella (2000-Current) (PN)

== Transport ==
Malta Public Transport operates 3 bus routes that either depart from/ arrive to/ pass through Mġarr.

Routes that pass through Mġarr
Route Number	From	Via	To	Frequency
44	Valletta	Floriana, Pietá, Msida, Swatar, Birkirkara, Lija, Mosta, Żebbiegħ, Mġarr, Manikata	Għajn Tuffieħa	Every 30 minutes
101	Ċirkewwa	Marfa, Mellieħa, Manikata, Għajn Tuffieħa, Iż-Żebbiegħ	Mġarr (Note: In Summer, the route gets extended and stops at Ġnejna Bay.)	Every 1 hour
238	Valletta (Note: During weekdays, the route departs from Valletta.); Mater Dei (Note: During weekends, the route departs from Mater Dei Hospital.)	Floriana, Pietá, Msida, Mater Dei, San Ġwann, Naxxar, Mosta, Żebbiegħ	Mġarr	Every 1 hour

== Zones in Mġarr ==
Mġarr is not split into official zones, however the following zones are widely accepted as the main subdivisions of the town.

- Binġemma
- Fomm ir-Riħ
- Għajn Tuffieħa
- Il-Ballut
- Il-Ġnejna
- Is-Santi
- L-Imġarr ta' Barra
- L-Imġarr ta' Ġewwa
- L-Iskirvit
- L-Isqorba
- Ta' l-Abbatija
- Ta' Mrejnu
- Ta' Tewma
- Tar-Ragħad
- Iż-Żebbiegħ

== Notable people ==
- Alicia Bugeja Said (born 1987), politician
- Christabelle Borg (born 1992), singer, represented Malta in the Eurovision Song Contest 2018
- Myles Beerman (born 1999), professional footballer who plays as a defender for Rangers F.C.
- Gaia Cauchi (born 2002), singer, won the Junior Eurovision Song Contest 2013

== Twin towns – sister cities ==
Mġarr is twinned with:

- Mathi, Italy
