= 2023–24 Gozo First Division =

Gozo Football League First Division
- Season: 2023–24
- Dates: 7 September 2023 – 21 April 2024
- Champions: Nadur Youngsters
- Relegated: Kerċem Ajax

The 2023–24 Gozo First Division (known as the BOV GFL First Division for sponsorship reasons) was the 77th season of the Gozo Football League First Division, the highest division in Gozitan football. The season began on 7 September 2023 and ended on 21 April 2024.

Nadur Youngsters won the league title (their third consecutive title win and fifteenth overall). The seventh-placed team (Għajnsielem) qualified for the Gozo First Division play-off, winning to retain their place in the league. The bottom-placed team (Kerċem Ajax) were relegated to the 2024–25 Gozo Second Division.

== Teams ==
The league consisted of eight teams; the top six teams from the previous season, and two teams promoted from the Gozo Football League Second Division. Nadur Youngsters entered the season as defending champions.

2022–23 Gozo Football League Second Division champions S.K. Victoria Wanderers replaced the 2022–23 Gozo Football League First Division bottom-placed team Sannat Lions. Second Division runners-up Xagħra United defeated seventh-placed First Division team Victoria Hotspurs in a play-off to take their place in the league.

| Team | Home city |
|---|---|
| Għajnsielem | Għajnsielem |
| Kerċem Ajax | Kerċem |
| Nadur Youngsters | Nadur |
| Oratory Youths | Victoria |
| Qala Saints | Qala |
| S.K. Victoria Wanderers | Victoria |
| Xagħra United | Xagħra |
| Xewkija Tigers | Xewkija |

== League table ==
| Pos | Team | Pld | W | D | L | GF | GA | GD | Pts | Qualification or relegation |
|---|---|---|---|---|---|---|---|---|---|---|
| 1 | Nadur Youngsters (C) | 21 | 14 | 5 | 2 | 55 | 16 | +39 | 47 | |
| 2 | Qala Saints | 21 | 14 | 3 | 4 | 42 | 17 | +25 | 45 | |
| 3 | S.K. Victoria Wanderers | 21 | 7 | 6 | 8 | 38 | 33 | +5 | 27 | |
| 4 | Xewkija Tigers | 21 | 6 | 7 | 8 | 26 | 33 | −7 | 25 | |
| 5 | Xagħra United | 21 | 5 | 7 | 9 | 19 | 37 | −18 | 22 | |
| 6 | Oratory Youths | 21 | 4 | 9 | 8 | 22 | 35 | −13 | 21 | |
| 7 | Għajnsielem (O) | 21 | 6 | 3 | 12 | 29 | 51 | −22 | 21 | Qualification for the Gozo First Division play-off |
| 8 | Kerċem Ajax (R) | 21 | 4 | 8 | 9 | 23 | 32 | −9 | 20 | Relegation to the Gozo Second Division |

Source: Gozo FA
Rules for classification: 1) Points; 2) Play-off (only if deciding champion); 3) Head-to-head points; 4) Head-to-head goal difference; 5) Head-to-head goals scored; 6) Goal difference; 7) Goals scored.
(C) Champions; (O) Play-off winners; (R) Relegated

== Results ==
Each team faces each other three times (once at home, once away, and then once more either at home or away).

| Home \ Away | GĦJ | KRĊ | NDR | ORA | QAL | SKV | XRA | XWK | GĦJ | KRĊ | NDR | ORA | QAL | SKV | XRA | XWK |
|---|---|---|---|---|---|---|---|---|---|---|---|---|---|---|---|---|
| Għajnsielem | — | 2–1 | 0–4 | 2–2 | 0–3 | 3–6 | 2–0 | 2–3 | — | 1–1 | — | 1–2 | — | — | — | 1–0 |
| Kerċem Ajax | 0–0 | — | 1–3 | 1–3 | 2–1 | 0–0 | 1–2 | 0–1 | — | — | 0–5 | 2–2 | — | 2–3 | — | 1–2 |
| Nadur Youngsters | 6–0 | 0–0 | — | 5–0 | 3–0 | 1–0 | 2–4 | 5–0 | 2–0 | — | — | — | 1–1 | 4–0 | 2–0 | — |
| Oratory Youths | 1–3 | 0–4 | 1–1 | — | 1–3 | 0–4 | 0–0 | 2–2 | — | — | 0–2 | — | 0–0 | 1–1 | 3–1 | — |
| Qala Saints | 6–2 | 2–3 | 0–2 | 1–0 | — | 0–0 | 4–0 | 2–1 | 3–1 | 2–0 | — | — | — | — | — | — |
| S.K. Victoria Wanderers | 2–3 | 2–3 | 1–3 | 1–0 | 0–3 | — | 3–0 | 2–3 | 3–1 | — | — | — | 1–2 | — | — | 0–0 |
| Xagħra United | 1–4 | 1–1 | 1–1 | 0–0 | 0–2 | 0–5 | — | 1–1 | 3–1 | 0–0 | — | — | 0–2 | 2–2 | — | — |
| Xewkija Tigers | 2–0 | 0–0 | 1–1 | 0–0 | 0–1 | 2–2 | 0–1 | — | — | — | 6–2 | 1–4 | 0–4 | — | 1–2 | — |

Source: Gozo FA
Legend: Blue = home team win; Yellow = draw; Red = away team win.

== Gozo First Division play-off ==
The seventh-placed team (Għajnsielem) faced the second-placed team from the 2023–24 Gozo Second Division (Sannat Lions) for the final place in the 2024–25 Gozo First Division.

| 26 April 2024 | Għajnsielem | 5–0 | Sannat Lions | Xewkija |
| 19:00 | Hili 29' da Cruz 41'; Emmanuel 62', 63', 76' | | | Stadium: Gozo Stadium |
