= 2012–13 Maltese FA Trophy =

Tournament details
- Country: Malta

Final positions
- Champions: Hibernians (10th title)
- Runners-up: Qormi

The 2012–13 Maltese FA Trophy was the 75th season since its establishment. For the second season, the competition will include all teams from Malta and Gozo. The competition began on 5 September 2012 and is ended on 19 May 2013 with the final in Ta' Qali Stadium. The defending champions are Hibernians, having won their 9th Maltese Cup last season. The winner will qualify to the first qualifying round of the 2013–14 UEFA Europa League.

Hibernians were the defending champions, and they retain the trophy.

== Calendar ==
Matches began on 5 September 2012 and concluded with the final on 19 May 2013.

Round	Date	Fixtures	New entrants	Venues
First Round	5–11 September 2012	14	28	Centenary Stadium; Gozo Stadium; Sannat Ground
Second Round	19–21 October 2012	20	26	Centenary Stadium; Victor Tedesco Stadium; Gozo Stadium; Sirens Stadium; Luxol Stadium
Third Round	30 November - 2 December 2012	16	12	TBC
Fourth Round	20–23 January 2013	8	–	TBC
Quarter-finals	17 February 2013	4	–	TBC
Semi-finals	17–18 May 2013	2	–	Ta' Qali National Stadium
Final	22 May 2013	1	–	Ta' Qali National Stadium

== First round ==
Entering this round were clubs from the Maltese Third Division, the Gozo Football League First Division and the Gozo Football League Second Division. These matches took place between 5 and 11 September 2012.

Team 1	Score	Team 2
5 September 2012
Xghajra Tornadoes	0–5	Mtarfa
6 September 2012
(Gozo) St. Lawrence Spurs	0–2	Senglea Athletic
Mdina Knights	1–2 (a.e.t.)	Swieqi United
Santa Lucia	0–3	(Gozo) Victoria Wanderers
(Gozo) Sannat Lions	2–0	Kalkara
8 September 2012
(Gozo) Kerċem Ajax	4–2	(Gozo) Għajnsielem
(Gozo) Qala Saints	0–5	(Gozo) Xewkija Tigers
Ghaxaq	1–2	Marsa
Qrendi	1–4	Luqa St. Andrew's
9 September 2012
Attard	1–3	Sirens
(Gozo) Nadur Youngsters	8–1	(Gozo) Għarb Rangers
Ta' Xbiex	2–1	(Gozo) Munxar Falcons
Marsaskala	3–0	(Gozo) Victoria Hotspurs
11 September 2012
(Gozo) Xagħra United	2–0	(Gozo) Oratory Youths

== Second round ==
Entering this round were the 14 winners from the first round along with the 12 Maltese First Division clubs and the 14 Maltese Second Division clubs. These matches took place between 19 and 21 October 2012.

Team 1	Score	Team 2
19 October 2012
Mqabba	3–0	Kirkop United
Lija Athletic	3–1	Siggiewi
20 October 2012
Zebbug Rangers	3–0	Mellieħa
Marsaskala	3–1	Luqa St. Andrew's
Gudja United	6–0	Ta' Xbiex
Vittoriosa Stars	1–2 (a.e.t.)	Msida St. Joseph
Sirens	0–1	Gżira United
Żurrieq	4–0	Fgura United
St. Andrews	2–0	Birzebbuga St. Peters
Marsa	1–1 (a.e.t.) (7–8 p)	St. Patrick
Zejtun Corinthians	3–1	San Gwann
21 October 2012
Dingli Swallows	1–4	Naxxar Lions
Swieqi United	1–6	(Gozo) Sannat Lions
Senglea Athletic	1–1 (a.e.t.) (5–4 p)	(Gozo) Kerċem Ajax
Għargħur	4–1	Mtarfa
Mgarr United	1–2	(Gozo) Victoria Wanderers
Pembroke Athleta	3–2	(Gozo) Xewkija Tigers
St. Venera Lightning	3–2	(Gozo) Xagħra United
St. George's	0–1	Pietà Hotspurs
(Gozo) Nadur Youngsters	1–0	Marsaxlokk

== Third round ==
Entering this round were the 20 winners from the second round along with the 12 Maltese Premier League clubs. These matches took place between 30 November and 2 December 2012.

Team 1	Score	Team 2
30 November 2012
Naxxar Lions	3–4 (a.e.t.)	Balzan Youths
Lija Athletic	2–1	Għargħur
Gudja United	2–0	Senglea Athletic
Marsaskala	3–1	St. Venera Lightning
1 December 2012
Hibernians	2–1	Mosta
Sliema Wanderers	1–1 (a.e.t.) (6–7 p)	Zebbug Rangers
Birkirkara	1–0	Tarxien Rainbows
Melita	0–2	Floriana
Qormi	5–2 (a.e.t.)	Pembroke Athleta
Msida St. Joseph	0–2	St. Andrews
2 December 2012
Hamrun Spartans	1–3	Valletta
Gżira United	1–0	(Gozo) Victoria Wanderers
Pietà Hotspurs	0–1	Rabat Ajax
St. Patrick	1–2	(Gozo) Sannat Lions
Zejtun Corinthians	1–3	(Gozo) Nadur Youngsters
Żurrieq	1–2	Mqabba

== Fourth round ==
Entering this round were the 16 winners from the third round. These matches took place between 20 and 23 January 2013.

Team 1	Score	Team 2
20 January 2013
Marsaskala	0–3	Zebbug Rangers
St. Andrews	4–1 (a.e.t.)	Mqabba
22 January 2013
Gudja United	0–4	Hibernians
23 January 2013
Balzan Youths	3–2 (a.e.t.)	Gżira United
Valletta	2–0	(Gozo) Nadur Youngsters
(Gozo) Sannat Lions	0–5	Rabat Ajax
Lija Athletic	1–0	Floriana
Qormi	2–1	Birkirkara

== Quarter-finals ==
Entering this round were the 8 winners from the fourth round. These matches took place on 17 February 2013.

Team 1	Score	Team 2
17 February 2013
Balzan Youths	0–1	Qormi
St. Andrews	0–1	Lija Athletic
Rabat Ajax	0–3	Valletta
Hibernians	3–0	Zebbug Rangers

== Semi-finals ==
Entering this round were the four winners from the quarterfinals.

17 May 2013	Qormi	1–0	Lija Athletic	Ta' Qali
19:30 CEST	Bilbao 67'	Report	Giordimaina (red card) 79'; M. Fleri Soler (red card) 90+3'	Stadium: Ta' Qali National Stadium; Referee: Malcolm Spiteri

18 May 2013	Valletta	2–3	Hibernians	Ta' Qali
18:00 CEST	Vandelannoite (red card) 37'; Bartolo (red card) 39'; Toure 45+3' (pen.); Briffa 90+1'	Report	Failla 39', 45'; Muscat (red card) 45+2'; Tarabai 66'	Stadium: Ta' Qali National Stadium; Referee: Clayton Pisani

== Final ==
The final was played on 22 May 2013.

Qormi and Hibernians met together in the Maltese FA Trophy Once, having previously met once.

The last time Qormi and Hibernians met together in Maltese FA Trophy was during the 2011-12 final Hibernians beat Qormi by 3–1.

22 May 2013	Qormi	1–3	Hibernians	Ta' Qali
20:30	Gauci (yellow card) 66' (yellow-red card) 73'; Perez 90+1'	Report	Tarabai 53', 66'; Jackson 90+3'	Stadium: Ta' Qali National Stadium; Attendance: 4,276; Referee: Adrian Azzopardi
