= 2022–23 in Gozitan football =

- Gozo
- 2023 Island Games
- First Division
- Nadur Youngsters
- Second Division
- S.K. Victoria Wanderers
- G.F.A. Cup
- Nadur Youngsters
- Super Cup
- Ghajnsielem
- First Division Knock-Out Cup
- Nadur Youngsters
- Second Division Knock-Out Cup
- Xagħra United
- Second Division Challenge Cup
- S.K. Victoria Wanderers

The 2022–23 season was the annual competitive association football season in Gozo organised by the Gozo Football Association for 2022–23.

== Overview ==
During the 2022-23 football season, the Gozo national football team participated in the 2023 Island Games.

As for domestic club football, 14 Gozitan clubs participated in the 2022–23 Gozitan football season, with 8 playing in First Division, the top division in Gozo, and the remaining six in the Second Division.

The Gozo Football Association also held a number of cup competitions, namely:

- the G.F.A. Cup, a knock-out cup which was contested by all Gozitan clubs;
- the Super Cup, contested by the holders of the First Division and the G.F.A. Cup;
- the First Division Knock-Out, a knock-out cup contested by clubs playing in the First Division;
- the Second Division Knock-Out, a knock-out cup contested by clubs playing in the Second Division; and
- the Second Division Challenge Cup, a cup contested by clubs playing in the Second Division.

The draw for all the competitions organised by the Gozo Football Association for the 2022–23 season was held on 22 July 2022. All matches organised by the Gozo Football Association were held at either the Gozo Stadium or the Kerċem Ajax Stadium. No matches were held at the Sannat Ground, given that it was still being refurbished.

Gozitan clubs also participated in the knock-out cups organised by the Malta Football Association. Indeed, the clubs of the First Division participated in the 2022–23 Maltese FA Trophy whereas the clubs of the Second Division participated in the National Amateur Cup.

== 2023 Island Games ==
=== Squad ===
The following players were called up for the 2023 Island Games by coach Mark Buttigieg.

Caps and goals correct as of 20 June 2023

No.	Pos.	Player	Date of birth (age)	Caps	Goals	Club
1	GK	Steve Sultana	7 September 1990 (age 36)	0	0	(Gozo Football Association) Nadur Youngsters
12	GK	Daniel Spiteri	16 May 1996 (age 30)	0	0	(Gozo Football Association) Kerċem Ajax
2	DF	Sam Frank Bajada	16 January 1988 (age 38)	0	0	(Gozo Football Association) S.K. Victoria Wanderers
3	DF	Ferdinando Apap (captain)	29 July 1992 (age 34)	3	0	(Malta Football Association) Hibernians
4	DF	Lawrence Grima	31 December 1995 (age 30)	0	0	(Gozo Football Association) Qala Saints
5	DF	Neil Camilleri	2 May 2003 (age 23)	0	0	(Gozo Football Association) S.K. Victoria Wanderers
6	DF	Manuel Tabone	10 May 1989 (age 37)	0	0	(Gozo Football Association) Nadur Youngsters
11	DF	Kenneth Mercieca	29 October 1987 (age 38)	1	0	(Gozo Football Association) Xagħra United
13	DF	Gennaro Hill	20 April 1996 (age 30)	0	0	(Gozo Football Association) Nadur Youngsters
16	DF	Kurt Grima	17 December 2000 (age 25)	0	0	(Gozo Football Association) Għajnsielem
18	DF	Ian Xuereb	19 October 1993 (age 32)	0	0	(Gozo Football Association) Nadur Youngsters
8	MF	Dejan Bogdanovic	29 June 2003 (age 23)	0	0	(Gozo Football Association) Xewkija Tigers
10	MF	Shaun Attard	25 July 1994 (age 32)	0	0	(Gozo Football Association) Qala Saints
14	MF	Michael Bezzina	9 April 1992 (age 34)	3	1	(Gozo Football Association) Xagħra United
15	MF	Chris Mercieca	7 June 1997 (age 29)	0	0	(Malta Football Association) Qrendi
17	MF	Stefan Cassar	29 October 1997 (age 28)	0	0	(Gozo Football Association) Nadur Youngsters
7	FW	Jordi Parnis	19 January 2000 (age 26)	0	0	(Gozo Football Association) Qala Saints
9	FW	Sam Harland	14 September 1995 (age 31)	0	0	(Gozo Football Association) S.K. Victoria Wanderers
19	FW	Matthias Mercieca	20 August 2003 (age 23)	0	0	(Gozo Football Association) Xewkija Tigers
20	FW	Joseph Zammit	18 January 2001 (age 25)	0	0	(Gozo Football Association) Nadur Youngsters

=== Group 4 ===
Team	Pld	W	D	L	GF	GA	GD	Pts
Jersey	3	3	0	0	10	0	10	9
Gozo	3	2	0	1	4	1	3	6
Menorca	3	1	0	2	5	5	0	3
Saint Helena	3	0	0	3	0	13	-13	0

=== Fixtures ===
9 July 2023 Group 4	Jersey	1–0	Gozo	Saint Sampson, Guernsey
15:30 CET	Sol Solomon 36'	Report		Stadium: The Corbet Field

10 July 2023 Group 4	Gozo	3–0	Saint Helena	Saint Sampson, Guernsey
15:30 CET	Keith Yon 27' (o.g.); Samuel Harland 36'; Jordi Parnis 80'	Report		Stadium: The Track

11 July 2023 Group 4	Menorca	0–1	Gozo	Saint Martin, Guernsey
11:30 CET		Report	Jordi Parnis 53'	Stadium: Blanche Pierre Lane

13 July 2023 Match for 5th place	Guernsey	1–0	Gozo	Saint Martin, Guernsey
15:30 CET	Keene Domaille 52'	Report		Stadium: Blanche Pierre Lane

== First Division ==
First Division
- Dates: 9 September 2022 – 22 April 2023
- Champions: Nadur Youngsters (14)
- Relegated: Victoria Hotspurs; Sannat Lions
- Matches: 80
- Goals: 265 (3.31 per match)
- Top goalscorer: (Brazil) Marcelo Barbosa (Nadur Youngsters); 16 goals
- Biggest home win: Għajnsielem 6–0 Sannat Lions; Kerċem Ajax 6–0 Sannat Lions
- Biggest away win: Sannat Lions 0–8 Għajnsielem
- Highest scoring: Kerċem Ajax 6–3 Għajnsielem
- All statistics correct as of 26 March 2023.

The 2022–23 season was the 73rd edition of the Gozitan First Division. It was played between 9 September 2022 and 16 April 2023 and was contested by eight teams.

Club	Location	Position in 2021–22
Għajnsielem	Għajnsielem	2nd
Kerċem Ajax	Kerċem	3rd
Nadur Youngsters	Nadur	1st
Oratory Youths	Victoria	6th
Qala Saints	Qala	1st in Second Division
Sannat Lions	Sannat	7th
Victoria Hotspurs	Victoria	4th
Xewkija Tigers	Xewkija	5th

In terms of format, the First Division was split into two phases. In the first part of the season, the eight teams of the First Division faced each other played in a double round-robin format. Thereafter, the First Division was split into two divisions, with the top four at the end of the first part of the season qualifying for the Top Four and the bottom four qualifying for the Playout.

Each club in both divisions played each other twice, with the winner of the Top Four being crowned winners of the 2022-23 First Division, the club ending bottom of the Playout being relegated to the 2023-24 Second Division, and the club ending second from bottom getting the chance to defend the top flight status by qualifying for the Promotion/Relegation Play-off.

Ultimately, Nadur Youngsters won the league for a record 14th time, Sannat Lions got relegated, and Victoria Hotspurs ended up penultimate and vied for their top division status in the Promotion/Relegation Play-off, which they lost against Xagħra United.

=== First Phase ===
==== League table ====
Pos	Team	Pld	W	D	L	GF	GA	GD	Pts	
1	Nadur Youngsters	14	10	3	1	34	11	+23	33	Qualification for the Top Four
2	Qala Saints	14	8	4	2	31	16	+15	28	Qualification for the Top Four
3	Kerċem Ajax	14	8	3	3	28	14	+14	27	Qualification for the Top Four
4	Xewkija Tigers	14	6	3	5	19	11	+8	21	Qualification for the Top Four
5	Għajnsielem	14	4	3	7	26	25	+1	15	Qualification for the Play-Out
6	Oratory Youths	14	3	5	6	15	22	−7	14	Qualification for the Play-Out
7	Victoria Hotspurs	14	2	3	9	21	35	−14	9	Qualification for the Play-Out
8	Sannat Lions	14	2	2	10	11	51	−40	8	Qualification for the Play-Out

Updated to match(es) played on 29 March 2023. Source: Gozo FA
Rules for classification: 1) Points; 2) Play-off (only if deciding champion); 3) Head-to-head points; 4) Head-to-head goal difference; 5) Head-to-head goals scored; 6) Goal difference; 7) Goals scored.

==== Results ====
Home \ Away	GĦJ	KRĊ	ORY	NDR	QLS	SNT	VCH	XWK
Għajnsielem	—	0–0	1–2	2–4	1–1	6–0	2–1	1–1
Kerċem Ajax	6–3	—	2–0	0–2	0–2	6–0	3–0	1–0
Oratory Youths	2–0	0–1	—	0–2	0–3	2–0	2–2	0–1
Nadur Youngsters	3–1	0–0	2–2	—	2–0	2–1	3–0	3–1
Qala Saints	4–0	3–3	4–1	0–0	—	3–1	3–1	1–3
Sannat Lions	0–8	1–3	2–2	0–6	1–3	—	1–1	0–7
Victoria Hotspurs	1–0	3–2	2–2	3–5	3–4	2–3	—	1–3
Xewkija Tigers	0–1	0–1	0–0	1–0	0–0	0–1	2–1	—

Updated to match(es) played on 29 March 2023. Source: Gozo FA
Legend: Blue = home team win; Yellow = draw; Red = away team win.

=== Second Phase ===
==== Top Four ====
Pos	Team	Pld	W	D	L	GF	GA	GD	Pts	NDR	QLS	KRĊ	XWK
1	Nadur Youngsters (C)	20	13	4	3	47	21	+26	43	—	1–2	4–1	2–2
2	Qala Saints	20	11	6	3	42	25	+17	39	3–2	—	1–3	2–0
3	Kerċem Ajax	20	9	5	6	34	26	+8	32	1–2	2–2	—	0–0
4	Xewkija Tigers	20	7	6	7	26	19	+7	27	1–2	1–1	3–1	—

Source: Gozo FA
Legend: Blue = home team win; Yellow = draw; Red = away team win.
Rules for classification: 1) Points; 2) Play-off (only if deciding champion); 3) Head-to-head points; 4) Head-to-head goal difference; 5) Head-to-head goals scored; 6) Goal difference; 7) Goals scored.
(C) Champions

==== Play-Out ====
Pos	Team	Pld	W	D	L	GF	GA	GD	Pts		GĦJ	ORY	VCH	SNT
1	Għajnsielem	20	8	3	9	39	36	+3	27		—	2–0	2–3	2–1
2	Oratory Youths	20	6	5	9	24	33	−9	23		5–1	—	2–1	0–3
3	Victoria Hotspurs (Q)	20	4	4	12	32	45	−13	16	Qualification to Promotion/Relegation Play-off	1–2	3–0	—	1–2
4	Sannat Lions (R)	20	4	3	13	21	62	−41	15	Relegation to the 2023–24 Gozitan Second Division	1–4	1–2	2–2	—

Source: Gozo FA
Legend: Blue = home team win; Yellow = draw; Red = away team win.
Rules for classification: 1) Points; 2) Play-off (only if deciding champion); 3) Head-to-head points; 4) Head-to-head goal difference; 5) Head-to-head goals scored; 6) Goal difference; 7) Goals scored.
(Q) Qualified for the phase indicated; (R) Relegated

=== Promotion/Relegation Play-off ===
2022–23 in Gozitan football

The Promotion/Relegation Play-off was contested by Victoria Hotspurs, who finished second from bottom in the First Division, and Xagħra United, who ended runners-up in the Second Division. Xagħra United won the match 2–1, thus winning the right to participate in the upcoming First Division and condemning Victoria Hotspurs to Second Division football.

==== Details ====
22 April 2023
16:00 CET

Victoria Hotspurs	1–2	Xagħra United
Andrea Debrincat 40'	Report	Kenneth Mercieca 18'; Michael Bezzina 25'

Gozo Stadium, Xewkija
Referee: Darryl Agius

== Second Division ==
Second Division
- Dates: 16 October 2022 – 19 March 2023
- Champions: S.K. Victoria Wanderers (6)
- Promoted: S.K. Victoria Wanderers; Xagħra United
- Matches: 45
- Goals: 153 (3.4 per match)
- Biggest home win: S.K. Victoria Wanderers 5–0 Għarb Rangers
- Biggest away win: Munxar Falcons 0–5 S.K. Victoria Wanderers
- Highest scoring: Għarb Rangers 3–5 St. Lawrence Spurs
- All statistics correct as of 25 March 2023.

The 2022–23 season was the 61st edition of the Gozitan Second Division. It was played between 16 October 2022 and 19 March 2023 and was contested by six teams.

Club	Location	Position in 2021–22
Għarb Rangers	Għarb	6th
Munxar Falcons	Munxar	2nd
S.K. Victoria Wanderers	Victoria	8th in First Division
St. Lawrence Spurs	San Lawrenz	4th
Xagħra United	Xagħra	5th
Żebbuġ Rovers	Żebbuġ	3rd

Each team played each other 3 times, thus playing 15 matches in total. S.K. Victoria Wanderers won the Second Division for the sixth time whereas Xagħra United ended runners-up and qualified for the 2022-23 Promotion/Relegation Play-off.

=== League table ===
Pos	Team	Pld	W	D	L	GF	GA	GD	Pts	Qualification or relegation
1	S.K. Victoria Wanderers (P)	15	11	2	2	38	13	+25	35	Promotion to the 2023–24 Gozitan First Division
2	Xagħra United	15	9	2	4	29	17	+12	29	Qualification for the Promotion/Relegation Play-off
3	Żebbuġ Rovers	15	7	1	7	29	24	+5	22	
4	Munxar Falcons	15	5	4	6	21	31	−10	19	
5	St. Lawrence Spurs	15	4	4	7	18	24	−6	16	
6	Għarb Rangers	15	0	5	10	18	44	−26	5	

Updated to match(es) played on 25 March 2023. Source: Gozo FA
Rules for classification: 1) Points; 2) Play-off (only if deciding champion); 3) Head-to-head points; 4) Head-to-head goal difference; 5) Head-to-head goals scored; 6) Goal difference; 7) Goals scored.
(P) Promoted

=== Results ===
==== Matches 1 to 10 ====
Home \ Away	GĦB	MXR	SKV	STL	XGR	ŻBĠ
Għarb Rangers	—	2–2	2–5	3–5	0–3	0–3
Munxar Falcons	2–2	—	2–3	0–0	1–3	1–0
S.K. Victoria Wanderers	1–0	3–1	—	0–0	1–0	3–0
St. Lawrence Spurs	0–0	1–2	0–4	—	1–0	2–3
Xagħra United	2–2	2–2	1–0	2–0	—	2–3
Żebbuġ Rovers	3–1	1–2	2–2	2–1	2–3	—

Source: Gozo FA
Legend: Blue = home team win; Yellow = draw; Red = away team win.

==== Matches 11 to 15 ====
Home \ Away	GĦB	MXR	SKV	STL	XGR	ŻBĠ
Għarb Rangers	—	1–2				2–5
Munxar Falcons		—	0–5	2–3	0–4	
S.K. Victoria Wanderers	5–0		—	4–3		2–1
St. Lawrence Spurs	1–1			—	0–1	
Xagħra United	5–2		1–0		—	0–3
Żebbuġ Rovers		1–2		0–1		—

Source: Gozo FA
Legend: Blue = home team win; Yellow = draw; Red = away team win.

== G.F.A. Cup ==
G.F.A. Cup
Tournament details
- Country: Gozo
- Dates: 22 October 2022 - 23 April 2023
- Teams: 14

Tournament statistics
- Matches played: 13
- Goals scored: 67 (5.15 per match)
- All statistics correct as of 23 April 2023.

The GFA Cup was contested by all the fourteen clubs of First Division and the Second Division.

Out of the fourteen participants, the first two which were drawn, namely Nadur Youngsters and S.K. Victoria Wanderers, got a bye and qualified directly to the Quarter Finals. Conversely, the remaining twelve teams were drawn to contest the Preliminary Round, with the winners of the six ties joining Nadur Youngsters and S.K. Victoria Wanderers in the Quarter Finals.

=== Preliminary Round ===
22 October 2022	Żebbuġ Rovers (2)	1–2	Kerċem Ajax (1)	Kerċem Ajax Stadium

22 October 2022	Sannat Lions (1)	1–10	Qala Saints (1)	Kerċem Ajax Stadium

23 October 2022	Xewkija Tigers (1)	0–1	Oratory Youths (1)	Kerċem Ajax Stadium

23 October 2022	Għajnsielem (1)	5–2	Victoria Hotspurs (1)	Kerċem Ajax Stadium

25 October 2022	Munxar Falcons (2)	4–2	Għarb Rangers (2)	Kerċem Ajax Stadium

25 October 2022	St. Lawrence Spurs (2)	1–4	Xagħra United (2)	Kerċem Ajax Stadium

=== Quarter-Finals ===
12 November 2022	Xagħra United (2)	1–5	Kerċem Ajax (1)	Kerċem Ajax Stadium

12 November 2022	S.K. Victoria Wanderers (2)	0–3	Għajnsielem (1)	Kerċem Ajax Stadium

13 November 2022	Oratory Youths (1)	2–3	Qala Saints (1)	Kerċem Ajax Stadium

13 November 2022	Nadur Youngsters	4–0	Munxar Falcons (2)	Kerċem Ajax Stadium

=== Semi-Finals ===
2 April 2023	Għajnsielem (1)	4–2	Kerċem Ajax (1)	Gozo Stadium

2 April 2023	Nadur Youngsters (1)	3–1	Qala Saints (1)	Gozo Stadium

=== Final ===
2022–23 in Gozitan football

==== Details ====
23 April 2023
16:00 CET

Nadur Youngsters	6-0	Għajnsielem
Marcelo Barbosa 7', 23', 65' (pen.); Stefan Cassar 21'; Igor Nedeljkovic 28', 61'	Report

Gozo Stadium, Xewkija
Referee: Matthew De Gabriele

== Super Cup ==
Super Cup

The 2022 Gozitan Super Cup was the 32nd Maltese Super Cup, an annual football match played between the title holders of the Gozitan First Division and the G.F.A. Cup.

It was contested on 21 September 2022 by Nadur Youngsters, who won both the 2021-22 First Division and the 2021-22 G.F.A. Cup, and Ghajnsielem, who were runners-up in both competitions.

=== Details ===
2 September 2022
19:00 CET

Nadur Youngsters	2–4	Għajnsielem
Joseph Zammit 25'; Adrian Parnis 72' (o.g.)	Report	Patrick Dos Santos Cruz 2' 68' (pen.); Daniel Farrugia 45'; Shaun Attard 90+4'

Gozo Stadium, Xewkija
Referee: Darryl Agius

== First Division Knock-Out Cup ==
First Division Knock-Out Cup
Tournament details
- Country: Gozo
- Dates: 29 October 2022 - 12 April 2023
- Teams: 8

Final positions
- Champions: Nadur Youngsters (3)
- Runners-up: Qala Saints

Tournament statistics
- Matches played: 7
- Goals scored: 28 (4 per match)
- All statistics correct as of 31 March 2023.

The cup was contested by the clubs participating in the 2022-23 First Division. Given that there were eight contestants, all clubs were drawn to the participate in the Quarter-Finals.

=== Quarter-Finals ===
29 October 2022	Victoria Hotspurs	4–0	Oratory Youths	Kerċem Ajax Stadium

30 October 2022	Kerċem Ajax	0–3	Nadur Youngsters	Kerċem Ajax Stadium

6 November 2022	Sannat Lions	1–3	Għajnsielem	Kerċem Ajax Stadium

5 November 2022	Qala Saints	3–1	Xewkija Tigers	Kerċem Ajax Stadium

=== Semi-Finals ===
8 March 2023	Victoria Hotspurs	1–4	Nadur Youngsters	Gozo Stadium

8 March 2023	Għajnsielem	1–4	Qala Saints	Gozo Stadium

=== Final ===
2022–23 in Gozitan football

==== Details ====
12 April 2023
18:30 CET

Nadur Youngsters	2–1	Qala Saints
Marcelo Barbosa 11'; Gennaro Hili 41'; Igor Nedeljkovic (red card) 32'	Report	Rafael Conrado Prudente 32'

Gozo Stadium, Xewkija
Referee: Andrea Sciriha

== Second Division Knock-Out Cup ==
Second Division Knock-Out Cup
Tournament details
- Country: Gozo
- Dates: 24 March 2023 - 14 April 2023
- Teams: 6

Final positions
- Champions: Xagħra United (4)
- Runners-up: Żebbuġ Rovers

Tournament statistics
- Matches played: 5
- Goals scored: 14 (2.8 per match)
- All statistics correct as of 16 April 2023.

The clubs who ended up in the last four positions of 2021-22 Second Division qualified for the Preliminary Round. The winners of the two ties qualified for the semi-finals, where they joined the seeded teams, namely S.K. Victoria Wanderers as the club relegated from the 2021-22 First Division and Munxar Falcons as the Second Division runners-up for the same season, which got a bye and qualified directly to the Semi-Finals.

=== Preliminary Round ===
24 March 2023	Għarb Rangers	1–2	Xagħra United	Gozo Stadium

27 March 2023	Żebbuġ Rovers	1–0	St. Lawrence Spurs	Gozo Stadium

=== Semi-Finals ===
5 April 2023	Żebbuġ Rovers	5–1	Munxar Falcons	Gozo Stadium

5 April 2023	Xagħra United	2–1	S.K. Victoria Wanderers	Gozo Stadium

=== Final ===
2022–23 in Gozitan football

==== Details ====
14 April 2023
18:30 CET

Żebbuġ Rovers	0–1	Xagħra United
	Report	Leiner Garcia Panesso 58'

Gozo Stadium, Xewkija
Referee: Anthony Paul Vella

== Second Division Challenge Cup ==
Second Division Challenge Cup
Tournament details
- Country: Gozo
- Dates: 3 September 2022 - 1 April 2023
- Teams: 6

Final positions
- Champions: S.K. Victoria Wanderers (3)
- Runners-up: Xagħra United

Tournament statistics
- Matches played: 16
- Goals scored: 57 (3.56 per match)
- All statistics correct as of 31 March 2023.

The Second Division Challenge Cup consisted of two phases. In the first phase, the Qualifying Round, which was played between 3 September 2022 and 5 October 2022, the clubs of the Second Division faced each other in a single round-robin tournament. The clubs which placed in the first two places qualified for the final.

=== Qualifying Round ===
Pos	Team	Pld	W	D	L	GF	GA	GD	Pts	SKV	XGR	MXR	ŻBĠ	STL	GĦB
1	S.K. Victoria Wanderers	5	5	0	0	20	5	+15	15	—			3–1		4–0
2	Xagħra United	5	4	0	1	13	7	+6	12	1–4	—	2–0		5–2	
3	Munxar Falcons	5	1	2	2	8	11	−3	5	3–5		—		0–0	3–3
4	Żebbuġ Rovers	5	1	1	3	6	10	−4	4		1–3	1–2	—		1–0
5	St. Lawrence Spurs	5	0	3	2	5	12	−7	3	0–4			2–2	—	
6	Għarb Rangers	5	0	2	3	4	11	−7	2		0–2			1–1	—

Source: Gozo FA
Legend: Blue = home team win; Yellow = draw; Red = away team win.
Rules for classification: 1) Points; 2) Play-off (only if deciding champion); 3) Head-to-head points; 4) Head-to-head goal difference; 5) Head-to-head goals scored; 6) Goal difference; 7) Goals scored.

=== Final ===
2022–23 in Gozitan football

By virtue of finishing first and second place respectively in the Qualifying Round, S.K. Victoria Wanderers and Xagħra United won the right to play the Second Division Challenge Cup Final.

==== Details ====
1 April 2023
16:00 CET

S.K. Victoria Wanderers	1–0	Xagħra United
Kersten Grima 64'	Report

Gozo Stadium, Xewkija
Referee: Reuben Spiteri Delicata

== 2022-23 Individual Honours ==
Honour	Winner	Club/Notes
GFA Player of the Year Award	Jordi Parnis	Qala Saints
1st Division Top Scorer	(Brazil) Marcelo Barbosa; 16 goals	Nadur Youngsters
1st Division Foreign Player of the Year	(Brazil) Marcelo Barbosa	Nadur Youngsters
People Choice's Award	Jordi Parnis	Qala Saints
GFA Young Player of the Year	Matthias Cordina	Xagħra United
GFA Coach of the Year	Mark Buttigieg	Nadur Youngsters
2nd Division Player of the Year	Matthias Cordina	Xagħra United
2nd Division Top Scorer	(Nigeria) Aud-Gustine James Obaje; 14 goals	S.K. Victoria Wanderers
Gozo 2nd Div. Foreign Player of the Year	(Nigeria) Aud-Gustine James Obaje	S.K. Victoria Wanderers
GFA Fair Play Award	Sannat Lions	
GFA Official of the Year	Josmar Azzopardi	Żebbuġ Rovers
GFA Achievement Awards	John Camilleri	334 Career Goals; Top Maltese Scorer
GFA Achievement Awards	Frank Muscat	270 Career Goals; 7th Top Maltese Scorer
GFA Recognition Award	Gigi Xuereb	Salesian Youths; Lifetime Contribution

== Maltese FA Trophy ==
=== Preliminary Round ===
15 November 2022	Mqabba (Malta) (2)	3–2	Victoria Hotspurs(1)	Centenary Stadium

16 November 2022	Naxxar Lions (Malta) (2)	5–1	Oratory Youths (1)	Centenary Stadium

19 November 2022	Nadur Youngsters (1)	7–1	Vittoriosa Stars (Malta) (2)	Kerċem Ajax Stadium

19 November 2022	Xewkija Tigers (1)	2–0	Lija Athletic (Malta) (2)	Kerċem Ajax Stadium

20 November 2022	Kercem Ajax (1)	3–2	Marsaskala (Malta) (2)	Kerċem Ajax Stadium

20 November 2022	Ghajnsielem (1)	5–0	Qrendi (Malta) (2)	Kerċem Ajax Stadium

22 November 2022	Sannat Lions (1)	1–3 (a.e.t.)	Qala Saints (1)	Kerċem Ajax Stadium

=== Round Of 32 ===
14 January 2023	Birkirkara (Malta) (1)	4–0	Nadur Youngsters(1)	Centenary Stadium

14 January 2023	Attard (Malta) (2)	2–8	Kerċem Ajax (1)	Victor Tedesco Stadium

14 January 2023	Mtarfa (Malta) (2)	1–2	Qala Saints (1)	Victor Tedesco Stadium

15 January 2023	Pietà Hotspurs (Malta) (1)	2–0	Xewkija Tigers (1)	Victor Tedesco Stadium

15 January 2023	Għajnsielem (1)	1–3 (a.e.t.)	Ħamrun Spartans (Malta) (1)	Gozo Stadium

=== Round of 16 ===
15 February 2023	Hibernians (Malta) (1)	8–0	Kerċem Ajax (1)	Tony Bezzina Stadium

15 February 2023	Gzira United (Malta) (1)	3–0	Qala Saints (1)	Centenary Stadium

== National Amateur Cup ==
=== Preliminary Round ===
8 September 2022	Pembroke Athleta (Malta) (3)	2–6	Żebbuġ Rovers (2)	Sirens Stadium

8 September 2022	St. Lawrence Spurs (2)	0–6	Birżebbuġa St. Peter's F.C. (Malta) (3)	Kerċem Ajax Stadium

10 September 2022	S.K. Victoria Wanderers (2)	1–2	Xagħra United (2)	Kerċem Ajax Stadium

10 September 2022	Munxar Falcons (2)	2–0	Għarb Rangers (2)	Kerċem Ajax Stadium

=== Round of 16 ===
8 October 2022	Qormi (Malta) (3)	2–0	Xagħra United (2)	Sirens Stadium

8 October 2022	Siggiewi (Malta) (3)	2–1	Żebbuġ Rovers (2)	Sirens Stadium

8 October 2022	St. George's (Malta) (3)	9–2	Munxar Falcons (2)	Luxol Stadium
