= 2021–22 Gozo First Division =

Gozo Football League First Division
- Season: 2021–22
- Dates: 3 September 2021 – 10 April 2022
- Champions: Nadur Youngsters
- Relegated: SK Victoria Wanderers

The 2021–22 Gozo First Division (known as the BOV GFL First Division for sponsorship reasons) was the 75th season of the Gozo Football League First Division, the highest division in Gozitan football. The season began on 3 September 2021 and ended on 10 April 2022.

Nadur Youngsters won the league title. The bottom-placed team (SK Victoria Wanderers) were relegated to the 2022–23 Gozo Second Division.

== Teams ==
The league consisted of eight teams. Nadur Youngsters entered the season as defending champions.

Team	Home city
Għajnsielem	Għajnsielem
Kerċem Ajax	Kerċem
Nadur Youngsters	Nadur
Oratory Youths	Victoria
Sannat Lions	Sannat
Victoria Hotspurs	Victoria
SK Victoria Wanderers	Victoria
Xewkija Tigers	Xewkija

== League table ==
Pos	Team	Pld	W	D	L	GF	GA	GD	Pts	Qualification or relegation
1	Nadur Youngsters (C)	21	18	2	1	70	14	+56	56	
2	Għajnsielem	21	11	5	5	45	27	+18	38	
3	Kerċem Ajax	21	10	4	7	47	48	−1	34	
4	Victoria Hotspurs	21	8	6	7	36	33	+3	30	
5	Xewkija Tigers	21	6	5	10	35	50	−15	23	
6	Oratory Youths	21	5	6	10	25	32	−7	21	
7	Sannat Lions (O)	21	4	5	12	21	56	−35	17	Qualification for the Gozo First Division play-off
8	SK Victoria Wanderers (R)	21	3	5	13	16	35	−19	14	Relegation to the Gozo Second Division

Source: Gozo FA
Rules for classification: 1) Points; 2) Play-off (only if deciding champion); 3) Head-to-head points; 4) Head-to-head goal difference; 5) Head-to-head goals scored; 6) Goal difference; 7) Goals scored.
(C) Champions; (O) Play-off winners; (R) Relegated

== Results ==
Each team faces each other three times (once at home, once away, and then once more either at home or away).

Home \ Away	GĦJ	KRĊ	NDR	ORA	SLI	SKV	VHO	XWK	GĦJ	KRĊ	NDR	ORA	SLI	SKV	VHO	XWK
Għajnsielem	—								—							
Kerċem Ajax		—								—						
Nadur Youngsters			—								—					
Oratory Youths				—								—				
Sannat Lions					—								—			
SK Victoria Wanderers						—								—		
Victoria Hotspurs							—								—	
Xewkija Tigers								—								—

Source: Gozo FA
Legend: Blue = home team win; Yellow = draw; Red = away team win.

== Gozo First Division play-off ==
The seventh-placed team (Sannat Lions) faced the second-placed team from the 2021–22 Gozo Second Division (Munxar Falcons) for the final place in the 2022–23 Gozo First Division.

7 May 2022	Sannat Lions	3–0	Munxar Falcons	Xewkija
19:00	Solis 16', 45'; Grima 42'			Stadium: Gozo Stadium
