= 2015–16 Maltese FA Trophy =

Tournament details
- Country: Malta
- Teams: 65

Final positions
- Champions: Sliema Wanderers (21st title)
- Runners-up: Balzan

The 2015–16 Maltese FA Trophy was the 78th version of the knockout tournament. The competition started on 5 September 2015 and ended on 14 May 2016.

Birkirkara were the defending champions, but were eliminated in the semi-finals by Sliema Wanderers.

== Format ==
This version of the Maltese FA Trophy was a single elimination tournament contested by 65 teams. The winner, Sliema Wanderers, earned a spot in the Europa League. Sliema were unable to obtain a UEFA license. As a result, the berth was given to the fourth-placed team of the Premier League. Matches which were level after regulation went to extra time and then penalties to determine a winner.

== Schedule ==
Round	Date(s)	Number of fixtures	Clubs
Preliminary round	5 September 2015	1	65 → 64
First round	11–13 September 2015	12	64 → 52
Second round	23–25 October 2015	20	52 → 32
Third round	1 December 2015 – 6 January 2016	16	32 → 16
Fourth round	19–20 January 2016	8	16 → 8
Quarter-finals	19–20 April 2016	4	8 → 4
Semi-finals	7–8 May 2016	2	4 → 2
Final	14 May 2016	1	2 → 1

== Preliminary round ==
One preliminary match was played on 5 September 2015. The draw for the preliminary, first, and second rounds was held 18 August 2015.

Team 1	Score	Team 2
5 September 2015
Oratory Youths (1G) (Gozo)	5–1	Marsaskala (4)

== First round ==
Twelve first round matches were played between 11–13 September 2015. The draw for the preliminary, first, and second rounds was held 18 August 2015.

Team 1	Score	Team 2
11 September 2015
Kerċem Ajax (1G) (Gozo)	6–0	Kalkara (4)
St. Venera Lightnings (4)	5–3	(Gozo) Xagħra United (2G)
12 September 2015
Luqa St. Andrew's (4)	0–4	(Gozo) Xewkija Tigers (1G)
Ghaxaq (4)	1–2 (a.e.t.)	Marsaxlokk (4)
Għarb Rangers (2G) (Gozo)	0–4	Ta' Xbiex (4)
Qala Saints (2G) (Gozo)	0–5	(Gozo) Victoria Hotspurs (1G)
Attard (4)	1–3 (a.e.t.)	(Gozo) Victoria Wanderers (1G)
Mtarfa (4)	1–0	St. Lucia (4)
13 September 2015
Nadur Youngsters (1G) (Gozo)	1–0	Mdina Knights (4)
St. Lawrence Spurs (1G) (Gozo)	1–0 (a.e.t.)	(Gozo) Oratory Youths (1G)
Xghajra Tornadoes (4)	0–1	(Gozo) Għajnsielem (1G)
Dingli Swallows (4)	2–0	(Gozo) Munxar Falcons (2G)

== Second round ==
Twenty second round matches were played between 23–25 October 2015. The draw for the preliminary, first, and second rounds was held 18 August 2015.

Team 1	Score	Team 2
23 October 2015
Rabat Ajax (2)	4–1	Msida St. Joseph (3)
Gżira United (2)	6–0	Sirens (3)
Gudja United (2)	0–1	San Ġwann (2)
Żebbuġ Rangers (2)	4–1	Qrendi (3)
24 October 2015
Zejtun (3)	1–0	Marsaxlokk (4)
Marsa (3)	2–4	(Gozo) Xewkija Tigers (1G)
St. Venera Lightnings (4)	2–1	Birżebbuġa (3)
Kirkop United (3)	3–2	Mtarfa (4)
Siggiewi (3)	0–3	Fgura United (2)
Swieqi United (3)	2–1	Ta' Xbiex (4)
Żurrieq (3)	1–1 (a.e.t.) (4–5 p)	Għargħur(3)
Melita (2)	3–1	Mġarr United (3)
25 October 2015
Vittoriosa Stars (2)	2–0	(Gozo) Kerċem Ajax (1G)
Ħamrun Spartans (2)	0–1	St. George's F.C. (2)
Lija Athletic (2)	2–1	Mellieħa (3)
Senglea Athletic (2)	1–2	Pietà Hotspurs (2)
Mqabba F.C. (2)	5–3	(Gozo) Victoria Hotspurs (1G)
Għajnsielem (1G) (Gozo)	2–1 (a.e.t.)	(Gozo) Dingli Swallows (4)
Żabbar St. Patrick (3)	6–1	(Gozo) Nadur Youngsters (1G)
Victoria Wanderers (1G) (Gozo)	2–4	(Gozo) St. Lawrence Spurs (1G)

== Third round ==
Sixteen third round matches were played between 1 December 2015 and 6 January 2016. The draws for the third and fourth round were held on 27 October 2015.

Team 1	Score	Team 2
1 December 2015
St. George's F.C. (2)	1–0	Mqabba F.C. (2)
2 December 2015
Pietà Hotspurs (2)	4–1	Zejtun (3)
St. Venera Lightnings (4)	0–2	Għargħur (3)
Rabat Ajax (2)	1–4	Melita (2)
Żabbar St. Patrick (3)	0–3	Gżira United (2)
9 December 2015
Birkirkara (1)	6–0	Kirkop United (3)
Balzan (1)	2–1	Fgura United (2)
Floriana (1)	3–0	(Gozo) St. Lawrence Spurs (1G)
Pembroke Athleta (1)	3–0	San Ġwann (2)
15 December 2015
Mosta (1)	1–2	Hibernians (1)
Swieqi United (3)	2–4	St. Andrews (1)
16 December 2015
Vittoriosa Stars (2)	0–1	Sliema Wanderers (1)
Qormi (1)	1–0	(Gozo) Għajnsielem (1G)
Naxxar Lions (1)	0–1	Lija Athletic (2)
Żebbuġ Rangers (2)	1–4	Tarxien Rainbows (1)
6 January 2016
Xewkija Tigers (1G) (Gozo)	1–3	Valletta (1)

== Fourth round ==
Eight fourth round matches were played between 19–20 January 2016. The draws for the third and fourth round were held on 27 October 2015.

Team 1	Score	Team 2
19 January 2016
Qormi (1)	1–4 (a.e.t.)	Tarxien Rainbows (1)
Balzan (1)	2–0	Melita (2)
20 January 2016
Hibernians (1)	1–2	Pembroke Athleta (1)
Floriana (1)	2–1	Lija Athletic (2)
St. Andrews (1)	1–1 (a.e.t.) (4–2 p)	Gżira United (2)
Pietà Hotspurs (2)	3–2	St. George's F.C. (2)
Birkirkara (1)	1–0	Valletta (1)
Għargħur (3)	1–2	Sliema Wanderers (1)

== Quarter-finals ==
Four quarter-final matches were played 19–20 April 2016. The draw for the quarter-final was held on 3 February 2016.

Team 1	Score	Team 2
19 April 2016
Balzan (1)	1–0 (a.e.t.)	Tarxien Rainbows (1)
Sliema Wanderers (1)	2–1	St. Andrews (1)
20 April 2016
Pembroke Athleta (1)	3–1 (a.e.t.)	Pietà Hotspurs (2)
Birkirkara (1)	2–0	Floriana (1)

== Semi-finals ==
Two semi-final matches were played 7–8 May 2016. The draw for the semi-final was held on 27 April 2016.

7 May 2016	Sliema Wanderers (1)	1–0	Birkirkara (1)	Ta' Qali
17:00 CEST	Denni 45'	Report		Stadium: Ta' Qali National Stadium; Referee: Glen Tonna

8 May 2016	Balzan (1)	3–1 (a.e.t.)	Pembroke Athleta (1)	Ta' Qali
17:00 CEST	Alan 80'; Kaljević 97'; Pedrinho 120' (pen.)	Report	Laudisi 34'	Stadium: Ta' Qali National Stadium; Referee: Philip Farrugia

== Final ==
The final was played on 14 May 2016.

Balzan and Sliema Wanderers never meet in the final. For Balzan this was their first-ever Maltese FA Trophy final in history, while for Sliema Wanderers this was the fortieth final, and they won it twenty times.

The last time Balzan and Sliema Wanderers met together in Maltese FA Trophy was during the 2013-14 Fourth round when Sliema Wanderers beat Balzan 8–7 on penalties when the match ends 1–1 draw.

14 May 2016	Balzan (1)	0–0 (a.e.t.) (4–5 p)	Sliema Wanderers (1)	Ta' Qali
17:00 CEST		Report		Stadium: Ta' Qali National Stadium; Referee: Marco Borg
	Penalties
	Fenech (penalty scored); Serrano (penalty scored); Pedrinho (penalty scored); Effiong (penalty scored); Grima (penalty missed)		(penalty scored) Scerri; (penalty scored) Farrugia; (penalty scored) Mandinho; (penalty scored) Muscat; (penalty scored) Baldacchino

== See also ==
2015–16 Maltese Premier League
