= 2018–19 Gozo First Division =

Gozo Football League First Division
- Season: 2018–19
- Dates: 14 September 2018
- Champions: Victoria Hotspurs (13th title)
- Matches played: 60
- Goals scored: 246 (4.1 per match)
- Top goalscorer: Elton da Silva (30 goals)
- Highest scoring: Xewkija Tigers 9–0 Munxar Falcons (25 November 2018); Munxar Falcons 5–4 Xewkija Tigers (10 March 2019); Xewkija Tigers 2–7 Victoria Hotspurs (14 April 2019)
- All statistics correct as of 17 March 2019.

The 2018–19 Gozo First Division (known as the BOV GFL First Division for sponsorship reasons) was the 72nd season of the Gozo Football League First Division, the highest division in Gozitan football. The season began on 14 September 2018. Victoria Hotspurs were able to defend the title won the previous season, winning their thirteenth title in their history.

== Format ==
The season is composed of a round-robin system where each team plays each other three times, totalling 21 games. The seventh-placed team will play a relegation play-off with the second-placed team in the Second Division. Most of the matches are scheduled to be played at the Gozo Stadium, with Sannat Ground and Kerċem Ajax Stadium being used as well.

== Teams ==
Locations of the 2018–19 GFA First Division teams

Eight teams compete in the league – the top six teams from the previous season, the winner of the relegation play-off between the seventh-placed team and the second-placed team in the Second Division, and a promoted team from the Second Division. Second Division winner Munxar Falcons replaced Oratory Youths.

Team	Home city	2017–18 season
Għajnsielem	Għajnsielem	4th
Għarb Rangers	Għarb	6th
Kerċem Ajax	Kerċem	5th
Munxar Falcons	Munxar	1st (Second Division)
Nadur Youngsters	Nadur	2nd
S.K. Victoria Wanderers	Victoria	7th
Victoria Hotspurs	Victoria	1st
Xewkija Tigers	Xewkija	3rd

== League table ==
Pos	Team	Pld	W	D	L	GF	GA	GD	Pts	Qualification or relegation
1	Victoria Hotspurs (C)	21	19	1	1	68	22	+46	58	
2	Nadur Youngsters	21	15	4	2	72	25	+47	49	
3	Xewkija Tigers	21	8	3	10	57	45	+12	27	
4	Għajnsielem	21	7	5	9	41	52	−11	26	
5	S.K. Victoria Wanderers	21	6	3	12	29	44	−15	21	
6	Kerċem Ajax	21	5	6	10	26	44	−18	21	
7	Għarb Rangers (O)	21	4	6	11	32	50	−18	18	Qualification for the relegation play-off
8	Munxar Falcons (R)	21	5	2	14	30	73	−43	17	Relegation to the Gozo FA Second Division

Updated to match(es) played on 28 April 2019. Source: RSSSF
Rules for classification: 1) Points; 2) Play-off (only if deciding champion); 3) Head-to-head points; 4) Head-to-head goal difference; 5) Head-to-head goals scored; 6) Goal difference; 7) Goals scored.
(C) Champions; (O) Play-off winners; (R) Relegated

== Results ==
=== Matches 1–14 ===
Teams play each other twice, once assigned as home and once away.

Home \ Away	GĦJ	GĦB	KRĊ	MXR	NDR	SKVW	VCH	XWK
Għajnsielem	—	2–2	2–2 (Note: The match played on 12 October was abandoned at half–time due to heavy rainfall with Kerċem Ajax winning 1–0. The second half was played on 15 October.)	3–2	2–3	2–6 (Note: S.K. Victoria Wanderers is originally the home team in this tie)	2–3	4–2
Għarb Rangers	0–3 (Note: Għajnsielem is originally the home team in this tie)	—	4–2	1–2	1–3	2–2	1–3	1–2
Kerċem Ajax	0–2	1–1	—	1–3	1–1	0–1	0–3	1–1
Munxar Falcons	2–2	0–2	1–5 (Note: Kerċem is originally the home team in this tie)	—	1–7	4–1	0–8 (Note: Victoria Hotspurs is originally the home team in this tie)	5–4
Nadur Youngsters	6–2	5–0	3–0	6–0	—	1–0	2–2	1–1
S.K. Victoria Wanderers	0–2	1–0	1–3	1–2	2–4	—	0–2	2–5
Victoria Hotspurs	3–1	3–1	6–1	3–2	3–2	2–0	—	2–1
Xewkija Tigers	1–1	7–1	2–3 (Note: Kerċem is originally the home team in this tie)	9–0	1–2	5–0	2–0	—

Updated to match(es) played on 28 April 2019. Source: RSSSF
Legend: Blue = home team win; Yellow = draw; Red = away team win.

=== Matches 15–22 ===
Teams play every other team once (either assigned at home or away).

Home \ Away	GĦJ	GĦB	KRĊ	MXR	NDR	SKVW	VCH	XWK
Għajnsielem	—	1–4	1–2				1–5	
Għarb Rangers		—	1–1		2–2		0–3	2–4
Kerċem Ajax			—	1–1	0–6			1–0
Munxar Falcons	1–2	1–4		—		0–3		
Nadur Youngsters				4–1	—			3–1
S.K. Victoria Wanderers	1–1	2–2	2–0		1–4	—		
Victoria Hotspurs			2–1	2–0	4–2	2–1	—	
Xewkija Tigers	2–5			4–2		1–2	2–7	—

Updated to match(es) played on 28 April 2019. Source: RSSSF
Legend: Blue = home team win; Yellow = draw; Red = away team win.

== Relegation play-off ==
A play-off match took place between the seventh-placed team from the First Division, Għarb Rangers, and the second-placed team from the Second Division, Sannat Lions, for a place in the 2019–20 GFL First Division.

30 April 2019	Għarb Rangers (1)	1–0	Sannat Lions (2)	Xewkija
	R. Zammit 16'	Report		Stadium: Gozo Stadium; Referee: Sandro Spiteri

== Season statistics ==
=== Top goalscorers ===
As of 28 April 2019

Rank	Player	Club	Goals
1	(Brazil) Elton da Silva	Victoria Hotspurs	30
2	(Brazil) Marcelo Junior Barbosa	Nadur Youngsters	28
3	(Brazil) Luis André de Melo Lima	Għajnsielem	23
4	(Brazil) Hugo Santa Rosa Cruz	Għarb Rangers	17
5	(Serbia) Darko Krstic	Xewkija Tigers	15
6	(Colombia) Leiner Garcia Panesso	Munxar Falcons/Nadur Youngsters	12
7	(Nigeria) Augustine James Obaje	S.K. Victoria Wanderers	11
8	(Brazil) Felipe Augusto de Oliveira	Kerċem Ajax	10
8	(Brazil) Henrique de Souza Maciel	Victoria Hotspurs	10
10	(Brazil) Claudio Antunes Pavlidis	Xewkija Tigers	9
10	(Brazil) Yuri de Jesus Messias	Nadur Youngsters	9

== Awards ==
=== Monthly awards ===
Month	Player of the Month	
Month	Player	Club
September	(Brazil) Elton da Silva	Victoria Hotspurs
October	(Malta) Adrian Parnis	Victoria Hotspurs
November	(Malta) Joseph Cefai	Xewkija Tigers
December	(Brazil) Marcelo Barbosa	Nadur Youngsters
January	(Brazil) Felipe Augusto de Oliveira	Kerċem Ajax
February	(Malta) Mark Grima	Xewkija Tigers
March	(Malta) Ferdinando Apap	Victoria Hotspurs
