= 2008–09 Gozo First Division =

Gozo Football League First Division
- Season: 2008–09
- Dates: 17 September 2008 – 5 May 2009
- Champions: Sannat Lions (9th title)
- Relegated: Qala St. Joseph
- Matches played: 58
- Goals scored: 189 (3.26 per match)

The 2008–09 Gozo First Division, also known as the ONVOL First Division due to sponsorship reasons, was the 61st season of the Gozitan First Division, which saw Sannat Lions declared champions for the first time in 19 years. The league started on 17 September 2008 with a match between Sannat Lions and SK Victoria Wanderers where the Victoria-based side won 3–0, with Ige Adesina being the first scorer of the season.

== Promotion and relegation ==
- Promoted: S.K. Victoria Wanderers
- Relegated: Xagħra United

== League table ==
Pos	Team	Pld	W	D	L	GF	GA	GD	Pts	Qualification or relegation
1	Sannat Lions (C)	18	11	3	4	32	16	+16	36	
2	Għajnsielem	18	9	6	3	34	26	+8	33	
3	Victoria Hotspurs	18	9	2	7	34	28	+6	29	
4	S.K. Victoria Wanderers	18	6	6	6	21	17	+4	24	
5	Nadur Youngsters	18	5	6	7	20	21	−1	21	
6	Kerċem Ajax	18	4	7	7	29	35	−6	19	Qualification for the relegation play-off
7	Qala St. Joseph (R)	18	1	6	11	14	41	−27	9	Relegation to the GFL Second Division

Source: RSSSF
Rules for classification: 1) Points; 2) Play-off (only if deciding champion and UEFA competition places); 3) Head-to-head points; 4) Head-to-head goal difference; 5) Head-to-head goals scored; 6) Goal difference; 7) Goals scored.
(C) Champions; (R) Relegated

== Results ==
=== Matches 1–12 ===
Teams play each other twice, once assigned as home and once away.

Home \ Away	GSM	KĊM	NDR	QLA	SNT	SKVW	VCH
Għajnsielem	—	1–1	4–3	2–2	0–4	1–1	3–2
Kerċem Ajax	3–4	—	0–0	1–2	2–2	0–1	1–2
Nadur Youngsters	0–1	1–1	—	1–1	0–2	0–0	2–1
Qala St. Joseph	0–1	1–1	1–3	—	1–1	0–4	0–3
Sannat Lions	3–0	2–2	3–1	1–0	—	0–3	2–0
S.K. Victoria Wanderers	1–1	1–1	0–0	3–1	0–1	—	0–1
Victoria Hotspurs	1–1	2–3	1–0	1–1	1–2	1–0	—

Source: RSSSF
Legend: Blue = home team win; Yellow = draw; Red = away team win.

=== Matches 13–18 ===
Home \ Away	GSM	KĊM	NDR	QLA	SNT	SKVW	VCH
Għajnsielem	—	3–0	2–0				2–4
Kerċem Ajax		—		5–3	0–2		
Nadur Youngsters		2–0	—	3–0			
Qala St. Joseph	0–3			—		0–3	
Sannat Lions	1–2		2–1	2–0	—	2–0	2–3
S.K. Victoria Wanderers	0–4	2–3	0–0			—	0–1
Victoria Hotspurs		4–5	2–3	4–1			—

Source: RSSSF
Legend: Blue = home team win; Yellow = draw; Red = away team win.

== Relegation play-off ==
A play-off match took place between the sixth-placed team in this division, Kerċem Ajax, and the second-placed team from the Second Division, Xagħra United, for a place in the 2009–10 GFL First Division.

5 May 2009	Kerċem Ajax (1)	4–1	Xagħra United (2)	Xewkija
				Stadium: Gozo Stadium
