= 2024–25 Maltese FA Trophy =

Tournament details
- Country: Malta
- Dates: 7 December 2024 – 18 May 2025

Final positions
- Champions: Hibernians
- Runners-up: Birkirkara

Tournament statistics
- Matches played: 38
- Goals scored: 136 (3.58 per match)
- All statistics correct as of 18 May 2025.

The 2024–25 Maltese FA Trophy (officially: Meridianbet FA Trophy) was the 87th edition of the football cup competition, the FA Trophy. After winning the competition, Hibernians have earned a place in the second qualifying round of the 2025–26 UEFA Conference League. Sliema Wanderers were the defending cup holders.

== Preliminary round ==
Seven preliminary round matches were played on 7 December 2024, featuring the teams from the 2024–25 Maltese Challenge League, 2024–25 Gozo First Division, and the four semi-finalists of the 2024–25 Maltese National Amateur League. However, thirteen teams were awarded a bye to the first round The draw was held on 12 November 2024 by Malta FA Director of Football Operations Stephen Azzopardi.

7 December 2024	Żebbuġ Rangers (2)	6–1	Oratory Youths (Gozo) (1)	St. Paul's Bay
14:00 CET	Adeyemi 1'; Camilleri 5'; Torres 9'; Bezzina 19', 84'; Attard 55'		Souza 45'	Stadium: Sirens Stadium

7 December 2024	Valletta (2)	3–1 (a.e.t.)	Nadur Youngsters (Gozo) (1)	Ħamrun
14:00 CET				Stadium: Victor Tedesco Stadium

7 December 2024	Mgarr United (2)	2–3	Victoria Wanderers (Gozo) (1)	Pembroke
15:00 CET				Stadium: Luxol Stadium

7 December 2024	Victoria Hotspurs (4)	3–0	Senglea Athletic (2)	St. Paul's Bay
16:30 CET				Stadium: Sirens Stadium

7 December 2024	Sirens (2)	3–1	Santa Lucia (2)	Ħamrun
16:30 CET				Stadium: Victor Tedesco Stadium

7 December 2024	Swieqi United (2)	0–0 (a.e.t.) (8–7 p)	Mtarfa (2)	Pembroke
17:30 CET				Stadium: Luxol Stadium

7 December 2024	Tarxien Rainbows (2)	1–1 (a.e.t.) (5–4 p)	Mellieħa (3)	Ta' Qali
18:30 CET				Stadium: Centenary Stadium

== Round of 32 ==
Sixteen matches were played between 10–12 January, featuring the seven preliminary round winners, the twelve teams from the 2024–25 Maltese Premier League, and the thirteen teams given preliminary round byes.

The draw for the Round of 32 and Round of 16 was held on 18 December 2024. The draws were held by Malta FA Director of Football Operations Stephen Azzopardi together with former Malta national team player Andrew Cohen and Byron Falzon Commercial Officer of IZIBET.

10 January 2025	Żurrieq (2)	1–0 (a.e.t.)	Mellieħa (3)	Ta' Qali
				Stadium: Centenary Stadium

10 January 2025	Xagħra United (Gozo) (1)	1–5	Victoria Hotspurs (4)	Ta' Qali
				Stadium: Centenary Stadium

10 January 2025	Sirens (2)	0–2	Qrendi (3)	Ta' Qali
				Stadium: Centenary Stadium

10 January 2025	Naxxar (1)	4–2 (a.e.t.)	Melita (3)	Ta' Qali
				Stadium: Centenary Stadium

10 January 2025	Pieta (2)	1–5	Marsa (3)	Ta' Qali
				Stadium: Centenary Stadium

11 January 2025	Birkirkara (1)	2–1	Balzan (1)	Ta' Qali
				Stadium: Centenary Stadium

11 January 2025	Hamrun Spartans (1)	5–0	Swieqi (3)	Ta' Qali
				Stadium: Centenary Stadium

11 January 2025	Marsaxlokk (1)	0–3	Mosta (1)	Ta' Qali
				Stadium: Centenary Stadium

11 January 2025	Sliema Wanderers (1)	8–0	Għajnsielem (Gozo) (1)	Ta' Qali
				Stadium: Centenary Stadium

12 January 2025	Lija Athletic (2)	0–5	Żabbar St. Patrick (1)	Ta' Qali
				Stadium: Centenary Stadium

12 January 2025	Floriana (1)	2–0	Xewkija Tigers (Gozo) (1)

12 January 2025	Gudja United (1)	0–5	Gżira United (1)

12 January 2025	Qala Saints (Gozo) (1)	2–0	St. Andrews (2)

12 January 2025	Hibernians (1)	3–0	Żebbuġ Rangers (2)

12 January 2025	Valletta (2)	4–0	Victoria Wanderers (Gozo) (1)

12 January 2025	Fgura United (2)	3–1	Attard (3)

== Round of 16 ==
Eight matches were played between 4–6 February, featuring the 16 Round of 32 winners.

4 February 2025	Qala Saints (Gozo) (1)	0–3	Hibernians (1)

4 February 2025	Fgura United (2)	0–3	Birkirkara (1)

5 February 2025	Gżira United (1)	0–1 (a.e.t.)	Valletta (2)

5 February 2025	Marsa (3)	0–4	Sliema Wanderers (1)

5 February 2025	Żabbar St. Patrick (1)	1–2	Hamrun Spartans (1)

5 February 2025	Mosta (1)	4–0	Qrendi (3)

6 February 2025	Victoria Hotspurs (4)	1–4	Floriana (1)

6 February 2025	Żurrieq (2)	0–4	Naxxar (1)

== Quarter-finals ==
Four matches were played between 5–6 March, featuring the 8 Round of 16 winners.

5 March 2025	Hamrun Spartans (1)	2–0	Sliema Wanderers (1)	Paola
18:00 CEST	Lopes 15', 27'			Stadium: Tony Bezzina Stadium; Referee: Fyodor Zammit

5 March 2025	Birkirkara (1)	3–1 (a.e.t.)	Valletta (2)	Ta' Qali
19:00 CEST	Lacunza 76'; Coppola 96'; Mbong 113'		Jefferson 68'	Stadium: Ta' Qali National Stadium; Referee: Trustin Farrugia Cann

5 March 2025	Floriana (1)	2–0	Mosta (1)	Paola
21:00 CEST	Gomes 42'; Vella 78'			Stadium: Tony Bezzina Stadium; Referee: Glen Tonna

6 March 2025	Hibernians (1)	2–0	Naxxar (1)	Ta' Qali
19:00 CEST	Villela 12'; Miullen 57'			Stadium: Ta' Qali National Stadium; Referee: Malcolm Spiteri

== Semi-finals ==
Two matches will be played 14 May, featuring the 4 quarter-final winners.

14 May 2025	Hamrun Spartans (1)	1–2	Hibernians (1)	Ta' Qali
20:45 CEST	Mbong 57'	Report	Degabriele 31'; Villela 43' (pen.)	Stadium: Ta' Qali National Stadium; Referee: Trustin Farrugia Cann

14 May 2025	Birkirkara (1)	2–1	Floriana (1)	Ta' Qali
18:00 CEST	Gaitan 25'; Maia 67'	Report	Kouro 80'	Stadium: Ta' Qali National Stadium; Referee: Slobodan Petrovic

== Final ==
18 May 2025	Birkirkara	1–2	Hibernians	Ta' Qali
18:30 CEST	Maia de Silva 72'	Report	Martinis 15'; Shaw 79'	Stadium: Ta' Qali National Stadium; Referee: Malcolm Spiteri
