= 2019–20 Gozo First Division =

Gozo Football League First Division
- Season: 2019–20
- Dates: 20 September 2019 – 8 March 2020
- Champions: Nadur Youngsters (12th title)
- Relegated: Għarb Rangers
- Matches played: 61
- Goals scored: 228 (3.74 per match)
- Top goalscorer: Igor Nedeljković (20 goals)

The 2019–20 Gozo First Division (known as the BOV GFL First Division for sponsorship reasons) was the 73rd season of the Gozo Football League First Division, the highest division in Gozitan football. The season started on 20 September 2019. Victoria Hotspurs were the defending champions after winning their thirteenth title in the previous season.

The league season was suspended indefinitely on 30 March 2020 by the Malta Football Association (MFA) following the outbreak of the COVID-19 pandemic in Malta. On 25 May, the MFA council ratified the Gozo Football Association's decision to declare Nadur Youngsters as league champions based on sporting merits.

== Teams ==
Locations of the 2019–20 GFL First Division teams

Eight teams compete in the league – the top six teams from the previous season, the winner of the relegation play-off between the seventh-placed team and the second-placed team in the Second Division, and a promoted team from the Second Division. Second Division winner Xagħra United replaced Munxar Falcons.

Team	Home city	2018–19 season
Għajnsielem	Għajnsielem	4th
Għarb Rangers	Għarb	7th
Kerċem Ajax	Kerċem	5th
Nadur Youngsters	Nadur	2nd
S.K. Victoria Wanderers	Victoria	6th
Victoria Hotspurs	Victoria	1st
Xagħra United	Xagħra	1st (Second Division)
Xewkija Tigers	Xewkija	3rd

== League table ==
Pos	Team	Pld	W	D	L	GF	GA	GD	Pts	Qualification or relegation
1	Nadur Youngsters (C)	15	14	0	1	48	6	+42	42	
2	Xewkija Tigers	15	11	1	3	46	19	+27	34	
3	Victoria Hotspurs	15	9	1	5	40	18	+22	28	
4	Għajnsielem	15	8	1	6	31	26	+5	25	
5	Kerċem Ajax	15	6	1	8	20	31	−11	19	
6	Xagħra United	15	3	2	10	17	45	−28	11	
7	S.K. Victoria Wanderers (Note: S.K. Victoria Wanderers kept their place in the top-flight as relegations were scrapped for the league season.)	15	3	1	11	10	27	−17	10	
8	Għarb Rangers (Note: Although relegations were scrapped for the season, Għarb Rangers opted to play in the Second Division.) (R)	15	2	1	12	16	56	−40	7	Relegation to the GFL Second Division

Updated to match(es) played on 08 March 2020. Source: Gozo FA
Rules for classification: 1) Points; 2) Play-off (only if deciding champion); 3) Head-to-head points; 4) Head-to-head goal difference; 5) Head-to-head goals scored; 6) Goal difference; 7) Goals scored.
(C) Champions; (R) Relegated

== Results ==
=== Matches 1–14 ===
Teams play each other twice, once assigned as home and once away.

Home \ Away	GĦJ	GĦB	KRĊ	NDR	SKVW	VCH	XRA	XWK
Għajnsielem	—	2–4	2–1	1–4	1–0	3–1	5–1	5–3
Għarb Rangers	2–1	—	2–4	0–4	1–2	1–6	4–4	0–4 (Note: Xewkija Tigers is originally the home team in the tie)
Kerċem Ajax	3–2	2–1	—	0–3	0–0	2–7	2–0	0–3
Nadur Youngsters	2–0	5–0 (Note: Għarb Rangers is originally the home team in the tie)	2–0	—	3–1	0–2 (Note: Victoria Hotspurs is originally the home team in the tie)	8–1	5–0 (Note: Xewkija Tigers is originally the home team in the tie)
S.K. Victoria Wanderers	0–2 (Note: Għajnsielem is originally the home team in the tie)	2–0	1–2	0–1	—	0–3	1–2	1–4
Victoria Hotspurs	0–3	5–0	2–1	1–2	0–1	—	5–1	0–0
Xagħra United	1–3	5–0	0–2	0–5	2–0	0–3	—	0–5 (Note: Xewkija Tigers is originally the home team in the tie)
Xewkija Tigers	4–1	5–0	4–1	0–1	4–1	4–3	2–0	—

Updated to match(es) played on 8 March 2020. Source: RSSSF
Legend: Blue = home team win; Yellow = draw; Red = away team win.

=== Matches 15–22 ===
Teams play every other team once (either assigned at home or away).

Home \ Away	GĦJ	GĦB	KRĊ	NDR	SKVW	VCH	XRA	XWK
Għajnsielem	—						0–0	
Għarb Rangers		—						
Kerċem Ajax			—			0–2		
Nadur Youngsters				—				
S.K. Victoria Wanderers				0–3	—			
Victoria Hotspurs						—		
Xagħra United		5–1		0–5			—	
Xewkija Tigers								—

Updated to match(es) played on 8 March 2020. Source: RSSSF
Legend: Blue = home team win; Yellow = draw; Red = away team win.

== Season statistics ==
=== Top goalscorers ===
As of 8 March 2020

Rank	Player	Club	Goals
1	(Serbia) Igor Nedeljković	Għajnsielem	20
2	(Brazil) Marcelo Barbosa	Nadur Youngsters	15
3	(Brazil) José Carlos Júnior	Xewkija Tigers	13
4	(Argentina) Emiliano Lattes	Victoria Hotspurs	12
4	(Brazil) Elton da Silva	Victoria Hotspurs	12
6	(Malta) Johnny Camilleri	Xewkija Tigers	10
7	(Brazil) Claudio Antunes	Xewkija Tigers	8
7	(Malta) Andrea Debrincat	Kerċem Ajax	8
9	(Malta) Shaun Attard	Nadur Youngsters	7
9	(Colombia) Johan Castaño	Nadur Youngsters	7
9	(Malta) Christian Mercieca	Victoria Hotspurs	7
9	(Brazil) Jackson Lima	Xewkija Tigers	7
