= Fontana F.C. =

Maltese football club

- Full name: Fontana Football Club
- Nickname: Tat-Triq tal-Għajn
- Founded: 1952
- Dissolved: 1969
- Ground: Silver Jubilee Sports Ground

Fontana Football Club was a Maltese football club from the village of Fontana, Gozo. Following some unofficial appearances under Fontana F.C., the club was officially founded under the name St. Andrew's in 1952. After several re-organisations, the club folded for good following the conclusion of the 1968-69 football season.

== History ==
During the season of 1951–52, a team under the name Fontana F.C. has played a number of friendlies against Gozitan clubs.

However, in 1952, Fontana was officially founded as St. Andrew's. The club was the brainchild of Mr Guzepp Schembri and Fr Ruzar Borg. and it used to play with striped shirts. St. Andrew's officially debuted in the Gozitan First Division in the season of 1952–53.

=== Debut season ===
St. Andrew's first evert match in the 1952–53 season was against Victoria Hotspurs on 21 December 1952, which at that time were the Galea Cup holders. In front of a large crowd at the then Silver Jubilee Sports Ground, Fontana beat Hotspurs with two-goals-to-one, courtesy of an opener from Cini and a deflected shot of Grech. In their second match, St. Andrew's faced the then Salesian Youths but lost two-goals-to-nil. Subsequently, St. Andrew's faced and saw off Xewkija Tigers with a one-nil victory, courtesy of a goal from Cini.

On 25 January 1953 and in the first match of the second round, St. Andrew's beat Hotspurs once again with the same score of two-goals-to-one. St. Andrew's goals were scored by guest player Cuschieri and Spiteri. In the penultimate match of the league, St. Andrew's faced Salesians, in what was a decider for the First Division title. St. Andrew's ended up losing heavily to Salesians, who in the end ran out five-nil winners and went on to win the First Division. St. Andrew's concluded their league commitments by beating Xewkija with the odd-goal-in-five. St. Andrew's goals came from Cini, who ended up as St. Andrew's top scorer for the season, and a double from Camilleri.

St. Andrew's first season was a relatively successful one, as they ended runners-up by a solitary point. Indeed, out of 6 matches played, St. Andrew's won all matches bar the two matches they played against the eventual champions.

During the same season, St. Andrew's also participated in the Galea Cup, but got knocked-out in the quarter-final after losing two-goals-to-one to Għajnsielem. Furthermore, St. Andrew's also fielded a second team in the Second Division but fared poorly as it not only drew one match from four matches and lost the rest, but also failed to score a single goal in the process.

=== Subsequent seasons ===
St. Andrew's intended to participate in the 1953–54 season as well, to the extent that in the first meeting of the new council of the Gozo Football Association, St. Andrew's had five of its players designated as 'first-class players for Gozo' and thus could only play in the First Division. However, following disciplinary action taken by the said new council, St. Andrew's withdrew from the Gozo Football League together with Għajnsielem and Hotspurs. In St. Andrew's case, the club was also disbanded.

The club was re-organised again in 1957 to participate in the football season of 1957–58. St. Andrew's were scheduled to play in the Gozitan Second Division against Kercem Ajax, Sannat Lions, Xewkija Tigers and Nadur Olympians, the eventual winners. St. Andrew's was also one of the six Gozitan clubs to field a team in the Minors League. However, mid-way through the season and during a match against Nadur Olympians on February 9, St Andrew's disagreed with certain decisions taken by the referee and not only abandoned the match, but also informed the Gozo Football Association of its decision to withdraw from the league. The Association came down hard on St. Andrew's and suspended the club for life and barred its regular players from playing football for the rest of season and all its Committee members for the same season from taking part in any activities organised by the Gozo Football Association.

In 1961, St. Andrew's was reformed and switched its name to Fontana Juventus F.C.. Fontana Juventus played in the Gozitan Second Division and also made their way into the Tapie's 2nd Division Knockout Cup final but lost to the then Xagħra Young Stars. During the 1962-63 football season, Fontana Juventus played again in the Gozitan Second Division. Fontana Juventus was drawn in Preliminary Group A and ended up in the third place. Fontana won 2 matches, drew 1 and lost the other 3 matches.

In 1966, Fontana Juventus switched to simply Fontana F.C. and in the season 1967-68 Fontana were awarded the Good Conduct Cup for good conduct. Fontana's last appearance was during the season 1968–69, and the club was disbanded for good immediately thereafter.

== Honours ==
- First Division:
  - Runners-up (1): 1952–53
- Tapie's 2nd Division Knockout Cup:
  - Runners-up (1): 1961–62
- Good Conduct Cup:
  - Winners (1): 1967–68

== Literature ==
- Times of Malta, Archives
- Joseph Bezzina, Il-Fontana u Grajjietha - Mill-Qedem sa Zminijieta.
- Joe Bajada, Annwal Football Ghawdxi, 1993-94
