= 2024–25 Gozo First Division =

Gozo Football League First Division
- Season: 2024–25
- Dates: 6 September 2024 – 13 April 2025
- Champions: Qala Saints
- Relegated: Oratory Youths

The 2024–25 Gozo First Division (known as the BOV GFL First Division for sponsorship reasons) was the 78th season of the Gozo Football League First Division, the highest division in Gozitan football. The season began on 6 September 2024 and ended on 13 April 2025.

== Teams ==
The league consisted of seven teams (the top seven teams from the previous season). Nadur Youngsters entered the season as defending champions.

2023–24 Gozo Second Division champions Victoria Hotspurs declined promotion and became the first Gozitan club to switch from the Gozo football league system to the Maltese, reducing the number of First Division teams by one to seven teams.

Team	Home city
Għajnsielem	Għajnsielem
Nadur Youngsters	Nadur
Oratory Youths	Victoria
Qala Saints	Qala
SK Victoria Wanderers	Victoria
Xagħra United	Xagħra
Xewkija Tigers	Xewkija

== League table ==
Pos	Team	Pld	W	D	L	GF	GA	GD	Pts	Relegation
1	Qala Saints (C)	18	15	0	3	54	14	+40	45	
2	Nadur Youngsters	18	11	2	5	39	22	+17	35	
3	Xewkija Tigers	18	9	3	6	33	24	+9	30	
4	SK Victoria Wanderers	18	8	3	7	43	31	+12	27	
5	Xagħra United	18	7	1	10	29	40	−11	22	
6	Għajnsielem	18	6	2	10	27	44	−17	20	
7	Oratory Youths (R)	18	1	1	16	16	66	−50	4	Relegation to the Gozo Second Division

Source: Gozo FA
Rules for classification: 1) Points; 2) Play-off (only if deciding champion); 3) Head-to-head points; 4) Head-to-head goal difference; 5) Head-to-head goals scored; 6) Goal difference; 7) Goals scored.
(C) Champions; (R) Relegated

== Results ==
Each team faces each other three times (once at home, once away, and then once more either at home or away).

Home \ Away	GĦJ	NDR	ORA	QAL	SKV	XRA	XWK	GĦJ	NDR	ORA	QAL	SKV	XRA	XWK
Għajnsielem	—	4–3	3–1	2–4	0–2	1–0	1–2	—	0–6	—	0–3	—	—	0–1
Nadur Youngsters	2–1	—	2–0	2–0	3–2	1–0	0–0	—	—	4–0	—	3–1	1–1	0–2
Oratory Youths	1–4	3–7	—	0–4	1–2	1–3	0–3	3–3	—	—	0–5	0–6	—	—
Qala Saints	6–0	2–0	4–0	—	3–1	2–0	3–4	—	3–0	—	—	—	6–1	—
SK Victoria Wanderers	3–0	3–1	4–2	2–1	—	2–3	2–2	1–1	—	—	0–1	—	7–0	—
Xagħra United	4–1	0–2	3–1	2–3	5–1	—	1–0	1–4	—	1–2	—	—	—	1–3
Xewkija Tigers	1–2	0–2	5–0	0–3	3–2	2–3	—	—	—	3–1	0–1	2–2	—	—

Source: Gozo FA
Legend: Blue = home team win; Yellow = draw; Red = away team win.
