= Gozo Football League First Division =

Top division of the Gozo Football League in Malta

GFL First Division
- Founded: 1937
- Country: Malta
- Number of clubs: 8
- Level on pyramid: 1
- Relegation to: Second Division
- Domestic cup(s): G.F.A. Cup; GFA Super Cup; Independence Cup; Freedom Day Cup; First Division Knock-Out
- International cup: The FA Trophy Maltese
- Current champions: Qala Saints (2024–25)
- Website: Official website
- Current: 2025-26 Gozo First Division

The Gozitan First Division, known for sponsorship reasons as the BOV GFL First Division, is the top division of the Gozo Football League, the league competition for men's football clubs in Gozo.

The GFL First Division is played with a total of 21 games, usually held between September and April. The majority of matches are played at the Gozo Stadium and Kercem Arkafort Stadium.

== Clubs ==
=== 2022–23 season ===
Club	Position in 2021–22	Top division titles	Last top division title
Għajnsielem	2nd	7	2015–16
Kerċem Ajax	3rd	1	1985–86
Nadur Youngsters	1st	15	2023–24
Oratory Youths	6th	6	1959–60
Qala Saints	1st in Second Division	0	
Sannat Lions	7th	10	2010–11
Victoria Hotspurs	4th	13	2018–19
Xewkija Tigers	5th	8	2016–17

== List of winners by season ==
Key
Club (X)	Titles

Season	Winner	Runners-up	Third place
1937–38	Victoria Stars		
1938–39	Victoria City	Victoria Stars	Għajnsielem
1939–40	Xagħra Blue Stars (Note: Xagħra United were known as Xagħra Blue Stars and Xagħra Young Stars.)		
1940–41 to 1943–44	Cancelled due to World War II		
1944–45	Victoria Athletics	Xagħra Blue Stars	Xewkija Tigers
1945–46	Victoria Athletics (2)	Xewkija Tigers	Xagħra Blue Stars
1946–47	Victoria Athletics (3)		
1947–48	Competition not held		
1948–49	Salesian Youths (Note: Oratory Youths were known as Salesian Youths and Calypsian Bosco Youths.)	Victoria Hotspurs	Għajnsielem
1949–50 to 1951–52	Competition not held		
1952–53	Salesian Youths (2)	St. Andrew's	
1953–54	Competition not held		
1954–55	Victoria Athletics (4)		
1955–56	Competition not held		
1956–57 (Note: The result of the 1956–57 championship deciding match between Salesian Youths and S.K. Calypsians is unknown.)	Salesian Youths (3)	S.K. Calypsians	Xewkija Tigers
1957–58	Salesian Youths (4)	Għajnsielem	S.K. Calypsians
1958–59	Salesian Youths (5)	Għajnsielem	Xewkija United (Note: Xewkija Tigers F.C. were known as Xewkija United)
1959–60	Salesian Youths (6)		
1960–61	Competition abandoned due to problems within the GFA		
1961–62	Victoria Hotspurs	Nadur Youngsters	St. George's
1962–63	Victoria Hotspurs (2)	Xagħra Young Stars	Nadur Youngsters
1963–64	Xagħra Young Stars (2)	Nadur Youngsters	Victoria Hotspurs
1964–65	Victoria Hotspurs (3)	Nadur Youngsters	S.K. Victoria Wanderers
1965–66	Victoria Hotspurs (4)	S.K. Calypsians	Nadur Youngsters
1966–67	Victoria Hotspurs (5)	Nadur Youngsters	S.K. Calypsians
1967–68	Nadur Youngsters	Għajnsielem	Victoria Hotspurs
1968–69	S.K. Calypsians	Għajnsielem	Nadur Youngsters
1969–70	Għajnsielem	Victoria Hotspurs	Nadur Youngsters
1970–71	Għajnsielem (2)	S.K. Calypsians	Xewkija Tigers
1971–72	Għajnsielem (3)	Oratory Youths	Victoria Hotspurs
1972–73	Għajnsielem (4)	Nadur Youngsters	Victoria Hotspurs
1973–74	Għajnsielem (5)	Victoria Hotspurs	S.K. Calypsians
1974–75	Xewkija Tigers	Sannat Lions	Għajnsielem
1975–76	Sannat Lions	Xewkija Tigers	Għajnsielem
1976–77	Sannat Lions (2)	Għajnsielem	Victoria Hotspurs
1977–78	Sannat Lions (3)	Nadur Youngsters	Għajnsielem
1978–79	Victoria United (Note: S.K. Victoria Wanderers were known as Victoria United.)	Sannat Lions	Victoria Hotspurs
1979–80	Victoria Hotspurs (6)	Sannat Lions	Victoria United
1980–81	Sannat Lions (4)	Victoria United	Calypsian Bosco Youths
1981–82	Sannat Lions (5)		
1982–83	Xewkija Tigers (2)	Victoria Hotspurs	Sannat Lions
1983–84	Xewkija Tigers (3)	Sannat Lions	Calypsian Bosco Youths
1984–85	Victoria Hotspurs (7)	Xewkija Tigers	Calypsian Bosco Youths
1985–86	Kerċem Ajax	Xewkija Tigers	Sannat Lions
1986–87	Sannat Lions (6)	Victoria Hotspurs	Xagħra United
1987–88	Sannat Lions (7)	Victoria Hotspurs	Xagħra United
1988–89	Xagħra United (3)	Sannat Lions	Xewkija Tigers
1989–90	Sannat Lions (8)	Xagħra United	Xewkija Tigers
1990–91	Victoria Hotspurs (8)	Xewkija Tigers	Sannat Lions
1991–92	Xagħra United (4)	Xewkija Tigers	Victoria Hotspurs
1992–93	Xagħra United (5)		
1993–94	Victoria Hotspurs (9)	Nadur Youngsters	Xagħra United
1994–95	Nadur Youngsters (2)	Xagħra United	Munxar Falcons
1995–96	Nadur Youngsters (3)	Victoria Hotspurs	Għajnsielem
1996–97	Nadur Youngsters (4)	Victoria Hotspurs	Għajnsielem
1997–98	Xagħra United (6)	Nadur Youngsters	Victoria Hotspurs
1998–99	Nadur Youngsters (5)	Sannat Lions	Xagħra United
1999–2000	Victoria Hotspurs (10)	Għajnsielem	Nadur Youngsters
2000–01	Xewkija Tigers (4)	Nadur Youngsters	Għajnsielem
2001–02	Nadur Youngsters (6)	Xewkija Tigers	Għajnsielem
2002–03	Nadur Youngsters (7)	Xewkija Tigers	Żebbuġ Rovers
2003–04	Żebbuġ Rovers	Nadur Youngsters	Għajnsielem
2004–05	Għajnsielem (6)	Xewkija Tigers	Kerċem Ajax
2005–06	Nadur Youngsters (8)	Kerċem Ajax	Sannat Lions
2006–07	Nadur Youngsters (9)	Sannat Lions	Xagħra United
2007–08	Nadur Youngsters (10)	Victoria Hotspurs	Sannat Lions
2008–09	Sannat Lions (9)	Għajnsielem	Victoria Hotspurs
2009–10	Victoria Hotspurs (11)	Għajnsielem	Nadur Youngsters
2010–11	Sannat Lions (10)	Għajnsielem	Nadur Youngsters
2011–12	Xewkija Tigers (5)	Nadur Youngsters	S.K. Victoria Wanderers
2012–13	Nadur Youngsters (11)	Kerċem Ajax	S.K. Victoria Wanderers
2013–14	Xewkija Tigers (6)	S.K. Victoria Wanderers	Nadur Youngsters
2014–15	Xewkija Tigers (7)	Nadur Youngsters	Victoria Hotspurs
2015–16	Għajnsielem (7)	Xewkija Tigers	Kerċem Ajax
2016–17	Xewkija Tigers (8)	Nadur Youngsters	Għajnsielem
2017–18	Victoria Hotspurs (12)	Nadur Youngsters	Xewkija Tigers
2018–19	Victoria Hotspurs (13)	Nadur Youngsters	Xewkija Tigers
2019–20 (Note: The 2019–20 season was suspended in March 2020 due to the COVID-19 pandemic in Malta. Nadur Youngsters were crowned as title winners based on sporting merits.)	Nadur Youngsters (12)	Xewkija Tigers	Victoria Hotspurs
2020–21	Competition abandoned due COVID-19 pandemic in Malta		
2021–22	Nadur Youngsters (13)	Għajnsielem	Kerċem Ajax
2022–23	Nadur Youngsters (14)	Qala Saints	Kerċem Ajax
2023–24	Nadur Youngsters (15)	Qala Saints	S.K. Victoria Wanderers
2024–25	Qala Saints (1)	Nadur Youngsters	Xewkija Tigers
2025–26	Kerċem Ajax (2)	Għajnsielem	Xewkija Tigers

=== Performance by club ===
Titles won by club (%)
1. Nadur Youngsters – 15 18 (17.5%)
2. Victoria Hotspurs – 13 18 (17.5%)
3. Sannat Lions – 10 14 (13.6%)
4. Xewkija Tigers – 8 11 (10.7%)
5. Għajnsielem – 7 10 (9.71%)
6. Xagħra United – 6 11 (10.7%)
7. Oratory Youths – 6 8 (7.77%)
8. Other clubs – 11 13 (12.6%)

As of 25 May 2020

- Clubs participating in the 2019–20 Gozo First Division are denoted in **bold** type
- Clubs no longer active are denoted in italics

Club	Winners	Runners-up
**Nadur Youngsters**	15	14
**Victoria Hotspurs**	13	9
Sannat Lions	10	7
**Xewkija Tigers**	8	11
**Għajnsielem**	7	9
**Xagħra United**	6	4
Oratory Youths	6	1
Victoria Athletics	4	0
**Kerċem Ajax**	2	2
S.K. Calypsians	1	3
**S.K. Victoria Wanderers**	1	2
**Qala Saints**	1	2
Żebbuġ Rovers	1	0
Victoria City	1	0
Victoria Stars	1	0

== League appearances and goals ==
As at 31 December 2023

=== Appearances ===
No.	Player	Apps	Clubs
1	Chris Camilleri	353	Xaghra United/Xewkija Tigers/Nadur Youngsters/Sannat Lions/Kercem Ajax/Ghajnsielem/Victoria Hotspurs
2	Jason Portelli	308	Victoria Hotspurs/Zebbug Rovers/Sannat Lions/Xewkija Tigers/Kercem Ajax/Xaghra United/Ghajnsielem
3	John-Paul Grima	303	Victoria Hotspurs/Nadur Youngsters/Victoria Wanderers/Gharb Rangers/Sannat Lions
4	Paul-Anthony Camilleri	296	Nadur Youngsters/Kercem Ajax/Qala St. Joseph/St. Lawrence Spurs
5	John Camilleri	293	Xaghra United/Ghajnsielem/Sannat Lions/Xewkija Tigers/Kercem Ajax/Victoria Hotspurs

=== Goals ===
No.	Player	Goals	Clubs
1	John Camilleri	156	Xaghra United/Ghajnsielem/Sannat Lions/Xewkija Tigers/Kercem Ajax/Victoria Hotspurs
2	Antonio Claudio Pavlidis Cadu	138	Nadur Youngsters/Kercem Ajax/Xewkija Tigers
3	Sabri Rais	135	Victoria Hotspurs/Xewkija Tigers/Sannat Lions/Kercem Ajax
4	Chris Camilleri	126	Xaghra United/Xewkija Tigers/Nadur Youngsters/Sannat Lions/Kercem Ajax/Victoria Hotspurs
5	Frank Muscat	125	Sannat Lions/Victoria United/Xewkija Tigers/Victoria Hotspurs
