= Sannat Lions F.C. =

Maltese football club

Sannat Lions
- Full name: Sannat Lions Football Club
- Nickname: The Lions
- Short name: SLFC
- Founded: 1936; 90 years ago
- Ground: Sannat Ground
- Capacity: 1,500
- Coach: Aleksandar Simonic
- League: Gozo Football League Second Division
- 2023–24: 2nd, Gozo Football League Second Division
Home colours	Away colours

Sannat Lions Football Club, or simply Sannat Lions, is a Maltese football club from the village of Sannat, Gozo. The club was founded in 1937 and is currently playing in the Gozo Football League Second Division.

The Lions' heyday was in the mid-1970s and early 1980s in which the Lions won 5 championships in 7 years and established many records, where even at one stage they went over 2 seasons without tasting any defeat. Recent years have seen the Lions shifting between the two Gozitan divisions.

== Recent seasons ==
The Malta Football Referees Association has criticised a court ruling that condemned Sannat Lions player Antoine Camilleri to a €100 fine, a one-year ban from entering a football ground after he assaulted a referee during Saturday's GFA Division Two match at the Kerċem Stadium.

Camilleri attacked assistant referee Andrea Pavia in the dying minutes of Saturday's match between Sannat Lions and Oratory Youths, after he was just sent off for a second bookable offence. He pleaded guilty on Sunday to charges of threatening and slightly injuring a person as well as threatening at attacking another person, breaching the peace and using offensive language.

The MFRA opened its statement by thanking the Malta Football Association for the support it showed and believes that the local governing body of football's disciplinary body will do what the Gozo Court failed on Sunday, "to hand Camilleri a ban that he duly deserves."

"The committee of the MFRA is ordering its members, who amount to almost a 100 per cent of the officials present in Maltese football, to dismiss any appointment of matches where Antoine Camilleri could play once his suspension comes to an end," the MFRA said.

"The behaviour of some of the Sannat Lions FC fans during this attack was also unacceptable after they were seen throwing beer and spitting at the official who was grounded after the attack.

"Hours after this attack, the match officials continued to receive threatening messages on social media. Therefore, in a sign of solidarity with the game officials, the MFRA committee is ordering its members not to officiate matches involving Sannat Lions with immediate effect.

"These directives will remain into effect until the MFRA issues other instructions."

The team finished the 2006–07 championship in second place, losing the decisive final encounter with Nadur Youngsters 2–1 in a game where a draw would have sufficed to win their first championship in 17 years. The team was not able to challenge seriously in 2007–08 finishing 15 points behind Nadur Youngsters in third place, however in the 2008–09 season they finally won their first league title in 19 years, as they finished first in front of Għajnsielem.

In the 2009–10 season, despite high hopes of retaining the title, the team struggled and finished the league in 6th place. This necessitated a play-off against Second Division runners-up Xagħra United to maintain their top-flight status, which was ascertained with a 3–0 win. The season was redeemed by the GFA Cup triumph in the final with a 2–1 victory in extra time over Kerċem Ajax after a semi-final in which the Lions came back from 3–0 and 4–1 down and two sending-offs to draw 4–4 against holders SK Victoria Wanderers and then eliminate them 6–5 on penalties.

After a difficult 2009–10 season, Sannat reinforced their playing squad by signing some of the best local talent and went on to win the First Division title for their 10th time in their history. Along, they also won the Jum il-Helsien cup and also the 3rd most prestigious trophy 'The Super Cup'.

Despite a memorable 2010–11 season, the subsequent season saw some departures and the club decided to give some of their youth a chance. This was a mixed season for the Greens as they produced some very good and bad performances. The Lions survived the drop in the last match of the season where a win against Xaghra United saw them attain 5th place safely.

== Players ==
=== Current squad ===
As of 10 September 2023

Note: Flags indicate national team as defined under FIFA eligibility rules; some limited exceptions apply. Players may hold more than one non-FIFA nationality.

No.	Pos.	Nation	Player
1	GK	MLT	Klye Attard
2	DF	MLT	Anthony Sultana
4	DF	BRA	Lucas Barreto
10	MF	MLT	Christian Dingli
11	FW	COL	Sebastian Martinez
13	DF	MLT	Daniel Borg
15	FW	MLT	Andrew Borg
16	FW	MLT	Paul Said

No.	Pos.	Nation	Player
18	DF	MLT	Mario Mifsud
21	MF	MLT	Aaron Azzopardi
23	DF	MLT	Joseph Cassar
48	DF	MLT	Nicholas Grima
36	DF	BRA	Rennan Saldanha
7	MF	MLT	Gabriel Debrincat
23	MF	MLT	Mikhail Azzopardi
56	MF	BRA	Lucas Silva
3	MF	MLI	Kanta Boubacar

== Honours ==
MAIN ACHIEVEMENTS:

- First Division League
  - Winners (10): 1975–76, 1976–77, 1977–78, 1980–81, 1981–82, 1986–87, 1987–88, 1989–90, 2008–09, 2010–11
  - Runners-up (10): 1974–75, 1978–79, 1979–80, 1982–83, 1983–84, 1985–86, 1988–89, 1992–93, 1998–99, 2006–07
- Gozo FA Cup
  - Winners (9): 1974–75, 1975–76, 1976–77, 1977–78, 1978–79, 1980–81, 1981–82, 1982–83, 2009–10
  - Runners-up (7): 1973–74, 1987–88, 1989–90, 1993–94, 1995–96, 1999–00, 2010–11
- Second Division
  - Winners (7): 1966–67, 1973–74, 2000–01, 2002–03, 2004–05, 2019–20, 2025-26
  - Runners-up (5): 1953–54, 1964–65, 1970–71, 1972–73, 2013–14
- Super Cup
  - Winners (2): 2008–09, 2010–11
  - Runners-up (1): 2009–10
- Second Division Cup
  - Winners (1): 1969–70
  - Runners-up (1): 2002–03
- First-Second Division promotion/relegation play-off
  - Winners (1): 2013–14

MORE ACHIEVEMENTS:

- Independence Cup
  - Winners (2): 1996–97, 1998–99
  - Runners-up (4): 1987–88, 1989–90, 1995–96, 2003–04, 2009–10
- Jum il-Ħelsien Cup
  - Winners (5): 1978–79, 1979–80, 1980–81, 1981–82, 1997–98, 2010–11
  - Runners-up (1): 2008–09
- Farsons Tournament
  - Winners (3): 1977–78, 1978–79, 1979–80
- Republic Cup
  - Winners (4): 1975–76, 1976–77, 1977–78, 1978–79
- British American Cup: 3
  - Winners (3): 1969–70, 1970–71, 1972–73
  - Runners-up (1): 1971–72
- Gemaharija Cup
  - Winners (1): 1991–92
- Rothmans First Division Cup
  - Winners (1): 1987–88
