= Qala Saints F.C. =

Maltese football club

Qala Saints
- Full name: Qala Saint Football Club
- Nicknames: The Saints; Maroons
- Founded: 1968; 58 years ago
- Ground: Gozo Stadium; Gozo, Malta
- Capacity: 4000
- Chairman: Noel Mizzi
- Manager: Shaun Bajada
- League: Gozo FL First Division
- 2023/2024: 2nd
Home colours	Away colours

Qala Saints Football Club is a football club from the village of Qala in Gozo, Malta. The club was founded in 1968 and is named after the village patron Saint Joseph. They play in the Gozo Football League.

The team's traditional colours are maroon and light blue. The nicknames used for the players are the "Maroons" or "The Saints". Qala Saints's main rivals are Nadur Youngsters along with Għajnsielem

In the summer of 2010, the club changed its name to Qala Saints after declaring bankruptcy.

== History ==
The Maroons have never been the main contenders for the league except for last season (2024/2025). Qala Saints were crowned for the first time Champions of Gozo Football. The club made history after beating all their rivals, especially Nadur Youngsters to leave only three villages now without a League. <Gharb Rangers, St Lawrence Spurs and Munxar Falcons>. However, in the 2007/2008 season, the club won two of the major honours offered by Gozitan football – the G.F.A Cup and the Super Cup for the first time in the club's history. Other past honours won include the Second Division League on four occasions (1976/77, 1994/95, 2005/06 and 2021/2022), and the Second Division Knock/Out Cup on two occasions (2004/05 and 2005/06).

Qala Saints F.C. played in the Second Division was during the 2005/06 season, in which they were able to win the Second Division League and Cup double. The Saints won the Second Division League without conceding a single loss during the 2005/06 season. Furthermore, their foreign import, Ishaku Umoru, was joint top scorer in the Second Division League and Joseph Xerri was voted as Best Second Division League Player during this memorable season. During the 2008–2009 season the Maroons ended the bottom of the First Division and hence were relegated to the Second Division. After a promising start to the season, winning the first knockoutcompetition, Qala were expected to mount a serious challenge for promotion in 2009–10. In 2010 the club went bankrupt thus had to change the name from Qala Saint Joseph to Qala Saints creating a taboo in Gozitan football. The club after that passed from a decade of storms in the second division until the 2020s which saw a sudden rise.

During the 2020/2021 season Qala Saints FC won the league, however, because of COVID-19 regulations and termination of league they were not crowned as champions of the second division. The following season, Qala Saints never looked back, and continued with their path towards the first division, where they were crowned as champions of the second division in the season 2021/2022. The following two seasons, with a team made up mostly with local players who have been playing for the club's nursery since a very young age, they were a huge competitors for the titles together with Nadur Youngsters. During the 2023/2024 season, Qala Saints managed to win two trophies, the GFA 1st Division Cup and the First Division BOV GFA Cup both against Nadur Youngsters with an impressive result against all odds.

On 2nd June, 2024 a new Stadium for Qala Saints Football Club was officially opened and inaugurated by the Minister of Gozo and Planning Architect Clint Camilleri. It was named after the late Mr. Albert Mizzi whom in his life dedicated himself to the village of Qala especially the Qala St. Joseph Football Club. A massive concert by The Red Electric and the singer Ivan Grech followed at the Gnien il-Familja ( Family Park) right next to the new stadium. All past and present members and players of the Club were invited for this big celebration.

== 2022/23 squad ==
Goalkeepers: Franklin Xuereb, Mattia Zammit (C)

Defenders: Joseph Attard, Francisco Mumford, Gabriel Sillato, Samuel Sillato, Armando Xerri, Martin Buttigieg, Nicholas Inguanez

Midfielders: Joseph Buttigieg, Michael Mumford, Malcolm Cefai, Christoph Caruana, Daniel Portelli, Simon Spiteri, Jordi Parnis, Lucas Barreto da Silva

Forwards: Igor Nedeljković, Christian Mercieca, Lucas Mattheus Dos Santos, Rafael Conrado Prudente, Shaun Attard

The club's main sponsor for the current season are K & S Decorators, Paul Michael Mini Market, along with Xerri L- Bukkett and D Bar, Sportika and Urban Jungle – the local representatives of international sportsware company Nike.
