= Munxar Falcons F.C. =

Maltese football club

Munxar Falcons
- Full name: Munxar Falcons Football Club
- Nickname: Falcons
- Founded: 1972; 54 years ago
- Ground: Gozo Stadium, Xewkija, Gozo
- Capacity: 4,000
- Manager: Franklyn Cassar
- League: Gozo Football League Second Division

Munxar Falcons F.C. is a Maltese football club from the village of Munxar, Gozo, Malta. They were founded in 1972 and they are currently playing in the Gozo Football League Second Division.

== Honours ==
Munxar Falcons F.C. honours
Honour	No.	Years
Gozo Football League Second Division	2	1990–91, 2017–18
Second Division Knock-Out	5	1978–79, 1983–84, 1990–91, 2016–17, 2017–18
Adidas Cup	1	1976–77
