= Xewkija Tigers F.C. =

Maltese football club

Tigers
- Full name: Xewkija Tigers Football Club
- Nicknames: Tigers, Yellows
- Founded: 1938; 88 years ago
- Ground: Gozo Stadium; Gozo, Malta
- Capacity: 4000
- Chairman: Jeffrey Farrugia
- Manager: Vince Carbonaro
- League: GFL First Division
- 2024–25: GFL Gozo Division One, 3rd
Home colours

Xewkija Tigers F.C. is a football club from the village of Xewkija in Gozo, Malta. The club was founded in 1939, and currently plays in the Gozo Football League First Division.

== History ==
Xewkija Tigers Football Club is a Maltese football club, that was founded in 1938. However, the team did not play their first competitive match until five years after their inception. Prior to this, Xewkija Tigers had only engaged in friendly matches, primarily due to the challenging circumstances that the inhabitants of Gozo faced during World War II. It wasn't until the 1944–45 season, that the club made their debut in local competitions.

The following season, in 1945–46, Xewkija Tigers achieved their first trophy by winning the Galea Cup. They secured this title by defeating Xaghra Blue with a score of 1–0 in a match that was held on May 12, 1946.

In the period between 1958–59 and 1965–66 seasons, Xewkija participated in the local league under two different names, Xewkija United/Xewkija Tigers and Xewkija Rovers. The name Xewkija United was only used for a single season (1958–59), where successively the team was called again Xewkija Tigers. Whereas Xewkija Rovers continued to play as a separate team from the Tigers for some more years in the Gozo Football League, until the 1965–66 season. At the end of this season, it was decided that Xewkija Rovers should stop participating in the Gozitan league, leaving the village's representation solely to Xewkija Tigers.

Xewkija Tigers' first domestic league title came at the end of the 1974–75 season. This squad included the likes of John Busuttil, Mike Apap, Salvu Cilia, Charlie Le Prevost, Frank Mizzi, Carmel Attard, Raymond Rapa, Paul Vella, John Spiteri, Wistin Scerri, John Attard, Carmel Portelli, Benny Vella, Paul Hili, Joe Debrincat and Joe Grech. It was guided to victory under Mr. Joe Psaila, whereas the club was in the hands of President Mr. Frans Zammit Haber.

In the early 1980s (1982–83 and 1983–84) Xewkija Tigers won two consecutive league titles, together with the GFA Cup and the Silver Jubilee Cup. The team won all the titles in which the Gozitan league offered in these years. Xewkija were managed by Mr. Salvu Cilia.

Xewkija Tigers' last domestic title was achieved in the 2000–01 season in a final won against Nadur Youngsters F.C. by 4–3. Xewkija were once again managed by Mr. Salvu Cilia, who left his mark in all Xewkija's league titles (one as a player and three as a coach).

After two seasons in the lowest division of the Gozo Football League, Xewkija Tigers returned at the end of the 2008–09 season after winning the Promotion Decided with contenders Xaghra United by 3–2 (starting line-up: J.Grima, S.Mercieca, J.Vella, J.Vella, J.Cefai; S.Mizzi, A.Fotso, M.Pace (P.Rapa), J.Azzopardi (J.Azzopardi); C.Bugeja, R.Buttigieg). The coach at the time was Mario Bonello.

In 2011–12 season Xewkija Tigers won the title in Gozo Football League First Division, G.F.A. Cup, Independence Cup (Malta)

On 22 December 2022 Xewkija Tigers played against Sannat Lions, Xewkija beat Sannat 7–0

== Honours ==
First Division:

- Champions (8): 1974–75; 1982–83; 1983–84; 2000–01; 2011–12; 2013–14; 2014–15; 2016–2017
- Runners-up (9): 1984–85; 1985–86; 1990–91; 1991–92; 2001–02; 2004–05 2012–2013 2015–2016; 2019-2020

Second Division:

- Champions (7): 1964–65; 1969–70; 1972–73; 1980–81; 1987–88; 1995–96; 2008–09
- Runners-up (5): 1952–53; 1968–69; 1979–80; 1993–94; 2007–08

G.F.A. Cup:

- Champions (12): 1983–84; 1984–85; 1989–90; 1990–91; 1999–00; 2001–02; 2004–05; 2011–2012; 2014–2015; 2015–2016; 2017-2018; 2025-2026

Super Cup:

- Champions (4): 2004–05; 2011–2012 2014–2015 2015–2016 2016-2017 2017-2018

Republic Cup:

- Champions (1): 1999–00

Gemaharija Cup:

- Champions (1): 1989–90

Silver Jubilee Cup:

- Champions (1): 1983–84

Independence Cup:

- Champions (4): 1992–93; 2000–01; 2003–04; 2011–12

Freedom Cup:

- Champions (5): 1979–80; 1980–81; 2000–01; 2003–04; 2011–2012

Galea Cup:

- Champions (2): 1945–46; 1952–53

Challenge Cup:

- Champions (2): 1974–75; 1980–81

Rothmans Cup:

- Champions (1): 1987–88 (2nd Div.)

K.O. Winners Cup:

- Champions (3): 1993–94 (2nd Div.); 1996–97 (1st Div.) 2016-2017 (1st Div),2018-2019 (1st Div.)
