= Xagħra United F.C. =

Xagħra United
- Full name: Xagħra United Football Club
- Nickname: The Blues
- Founded: 1936; 90 years ago
- Ground: Xagħra United Ground; Xaghra, Gozo, Malta
- Chairman: Franco Debono
- Manager: Shaun Attard
- League: Gozo Football League First Division

Xagħra United F.C. is a football club from the village of Xagħra in Gozo, Malta. As it was founded in the year 1936, the club is one of the oldest clubs in the Malta. Xagħra United currently plays in the Gozo Football League Second Division, holding 6 First Division and 8 Second Division titles.

== Early history ==
It can be said that the establishment of the Boy Scout Movement in Xagħra in 1933 was the prelude to an activity in a number of cultural fields. Among these is the founding of the Xagħra Band Club in 1934. Two years later, in 1936, Xagħra saw the birth of its first football team.

The committee within the Boy Scout Movement, which was in charge of the football team, was set up in February/March 1936. The team was named Xagħra Scouts Team with the first coach being Ġużeppi Sultana. This was made possible by the initiative of Brother Hersey who also encouraged other Boy Scout movements in various Gozitan villages to imitate his initiative.

The meeting place of the Xagħra Boy Scout Movement also served as the first football club. The famous Xagħra square also served as the first stadium which housed the training sessions of the village's football team.

== First honors ==
The first footballing success to come Xagħra's way, during that time under the name of Xagħra Blue Stars, reached its climax when the team won the "Captain Renton Cup" with which they became Gozitan champions for the season 1939–1940.

The football team remained intact in the following years despite the dire times of the great war between 1939 and 1945. It is worth mentioning that at this time no competitive games were played between the villages. After the black clouds of the war passed, the football teams in Gozo became active again and the championships with the first competition being for the “Galea’s Cup”.

The central committee of the football team continued with its hard work for the benefit of this popular sport in Xagħra. Meanwhile, the team changed its name to "Xagħra Young Stars" with its club following in the footsteps of the "Victory" band club in the square.

== 1960s ==
After the team had been relegated to the second division they returned to the top division. This happened after winning the second division and K/O Championships in the 1961-62 season.

Another match in which the Xagħra Young Stars honored themselves as well as their village was the one played with the Floriana Football Club on Sunday, December 30, 1962. As the winners of the Gozo second division championship and Floriana championships of Malta, a friendly match was played where the team from Xagħra lost with the score of 1–0 after a stupendous display and a strong opposition against an excellent team.

The 1963–1964 season saw the Xagħra Young Stars return to glory when the Gozo Championships were held for the second time in their history after a quarter of a century of competitive games in Gozo. The match was against Victoria Hotspurs and in it Xagħra won with a score of 2–1. An interesting fact was that the game was a replay after the first one was won by Victoria Hotspurs but due to the fact that there was only one linesman it was played again after a protest.

Another success of the Young Stars team towards the end of their work was with winning the "British-American Shield" in the 1968–1969 season.

Towards the end of the '60s, the village of Xagħra saw the establishment of another football team called "Xagħra Blue Stars." The location of the club of this new team was where it is to this day, in Triq l-Arċipriet Dun Ġużeppi Diacono. Despite their efforts, the two Xagħra teams did not start to show much positive results so much so that in 1971, the two teams came together. A clear example of this is the current name of the Xagħra team, "Xagħra United F.C." The club of the new team remained that of Triq l-Arċipriet Dun Ġużeppi Diacono.

The Xagħra team under the new name immediately started with its successes when it was promoted to the top division. In the same season the team won the Knock-Out cup of the same division and the Good Conduct Cup. The years 1972 and 1973 brought with them the success of the ESSO Cup, a competition that was won only once by the Xagħra team in the last year it was played.

== 1970s & 1980s ==
In the 1986-1987 season, the team gained promotion to the first division with a young team under the leadership of the late Mr. Horace Mercieca. In the 1987-1988 season the Xagħra United team won the Gemeharija Cup for the first time when they won against Sannat Lions with the score of 1–0 on Sunday, May 8, 1988.

== Golden Season – 1988-1989 ==
The 1988-1989 season is a season that will never be forgotten by the people of Xagħra and their athletes and will remain inscribed in golden letters in the history of the club.

On June 12, 1988, the club was reopened with renovations to make it more relaxing for its players and fans.

This was the beginning of a year full of work that brought success in five competitions, i.e. each competition that the Xaghri team entered. United under Horace, a team that was made up of all Xaghrin players, won the first division championship along with the Independence Cup, Rothmans Cup, Gemeharija Cup and Super Cup. Victoria Hotspurs were the biggest rivals this season due to the fact that out of four in five competitions they were the finalists for winning the titles. It was only in the Gemeharija Cup when Xagħra United defeated a different opponent, this time, the Xewkija Tigers in the final. The success of this season was marked by big celebrations after twenty-five years of waiting for the championship to be won.

== 1990s ==
After the 1989-1990 season without honors, the 1990-1991 season brought success back on the hill of Casal Caccia, this time with winning the Independence Cup and the Gemeharija Cup. In two consecutive years the team was crowned with the title of the first division. This time under the cap of Mr. Frankie Muscat, the whole youth team from Xagħra, won the 1991 and 1992 championships together with the Independence Cup in the same year and the championship and that of the Gemeharija Cup in the 1992 and 1993 season. This was the first and only time in the club's history that two consecutive championships were won. The people of Xaghri were seen celebrating beautifully after winning three championships in five seasons.

The work of the committee together with the coaches and players culminated four seasons later when the team had a winning season again in the years 1997/1998. This time under the guidance of Eucharist Mercieca, with the presence of two foreign players and some players from outside the village who were brought in to strengthen the team, the championship and GFA won again. After a match against Nadur Youngsters which ended with the score of 3-1 and which will be remembered for the numerous presence of the Xaghrin fans, the people celebrated the success of the sixth championship and the last one until today.

The following season, 1998-1999, brought the success of the GFA Cup again, but since then it has been a difficult time for the Xagħra United team. After being relegated to the second division, the team won the championship again with the Knock Out in the years 2001-2002 under the leadership of Horace Mercieca.

== Recent history ==
After four seasons in the first division where there was also an attempt to win the championship, in 2008 the team was relegated to the second division again. After full work between the committee, coaches and players, during the 2014-2015 season, Xagħra United returned to the First Division. After winning the Knock Out Cup against Kerċem Ajax, with a decider match against Żebbuġ Rovers, the Xagħra United Football Club closed the championship chapter when they won with a result of 3-1 and ended up winning the title and promotion for the first division.

Xaghra United Football Club also won the 2018-2019 2nd Division Championship and are currently playing in the Gozitan 1st Division. During the 2019-2020 season, the team managed a six-placed final position after the League was halted due to the COVID-19 pandemic.

== Honors ==
First Division:

- Champions (6): 1939-1940; 1963-1964; 1988-1989; 1991-1992; 1992-1993; 1997-1998.

Second Division:

- Champions (8): 1961-1962; 1968-1969; 1971-1972; 1978-1979; 2003-2004; 2010-2011; 2015-2016; 2018-2019.

G.F.A. Cup:

- Champions (4): 1988-1989; 1991-1992; 1997-1998; 1998-1999.

Super Cup:

- Champions (1): 1988-1989.

Independence Cup:

- Champions (3): 1988-1989; 1990-1991; 1991-1992.

2nd Div K/O:

- Champions (4): 1961-1962; 1971-1972; 2003-2004; 2022-2023.

Gemaharija Cup:

- Champions (4): 1987-1988; 1988-1989; 1990-1991; 1992-1993.

Rothmans Cup:

- Champions (1): 1988-1989.

Good Conduct Cup:

- Champions (1): 1971-1972.

Esso Cup:

- Champions (1): 1972-1973.

== Current squad ==
Note: Flags indicate national team as defined under FIFA eligibility rules; some limited exceptions apply. Players may hold more than one non-FIFA nationality.

No.	Pos.	Nation	Player
1	GK	MLT	Lorjean Xuereb
2	DF	MLT	Johann Bajada
3	DF	MLT	Savio Galea
6	MF	BRA	Guilherme Xuxa
7	FW	MLT	Lucas Farrugia
8	MF	MLT	Etienne Xiberras
9	FW	MLT	Joel Xuereb
10	MF	MLT	Christopher Camilleri
11	DF	MLT	Steve Sultana
12	GK	MLT	Mattia Zammit
13	FW	MLT	Melchior Gafa
16	FW	MLT	Marlon Mamo

No.	Pos.	Nation	Player
17	FW	MLT	Carmelo Pace
18	MF	SRB	Aleksa Bozovic
21	DF	GHA	Daniel Sowatey
23	DF	MLT	Fabian Xuereb
26	MF	MLT	Neil Sultana
27	MF	MLT	Tristen Agius
28	GK	BRA	Tom
30	MF	MLT	Joe-Peter Mifsud
33	FW	BRA	Claudir
88	MF	COD	Yousouf Rodo
90	FW	BRA	Julian Suzuki
99	MF	MLT	Delan Saliba
