= Oratory Youths F.C. =

Maltese football club

Oratory Youths
- Full name: Oratory Youths Football Club
- Nickname: Salesians/Greens/The Youths
- Founded: 1946; 80 years ago
- Ground: Gozo Stadium; Gozo, Malta
- Capacity: 4,000
- Chairman: Joseph Micallef
- Manager: Michael Vella
- League: Gozo BOV Division One
- 2022-23: Gozo FL Division One, 6th
Home colours	Away colours

Oratory Youths Football Club is a football club from the Maltese Isle of Gozo, from the capital of Victoria. The club, previously called the Salesian Youths, was founded in 1946, in relation to the Roman Catholic religious order Salesians of Don Bosco. The club was then renamed Oratory Youths but between the years 1978 and 1989 the club changed its name to Calypsian Bosco Youths before returning to the former and current name Oratory Youths. The club has won the Gozo Football League top division six times.

== Honours ==
- Gozo First Division
  - Champions (6): 1948–49, 1952–53, 1956–57, 1957–58, 1958–59, 1959–60
- Gozo Football Association Cup
  - Winners (1):1985-1986
- Gozo Second Division
  - Champions (4): 1948–49 (competed in both the 1st and 2nd div league), 1970–1971, 1979–80, 2012–13
- 2nd Division Knock Out
  - Winners (2):1991-92, 1994–95

Cups from the Past

- Liberty Cup
  - Winners (1):1952-53
- Coronation Cup
  - Winners (1):1952-53
- Galea Cup
  - Winners (Unofficial Statistic) (5):1951-1952, 1956–57, 1958–59, 1970–71, 1971–72
- Dingli Cup
  - Winners (Unofficial Statistic) (2):1956-1957, 1958–59
- MG Cup
  - Winners (1):1959-60
- Victoria Shield
  - Winners (1):2002

== Senior Squad for Season 2021–22 ==
Note: Flags indicate national team as defined under FIFA eligibility rules; some limited exceptions apply. Players may hold more than one non-FIFA nationality.

No.	Pos.	Nation	Player
1	GK	MLT	Paul Cremona
2	DF	MLT	Anthony Sultana
4	MF	MLT	Justin Azzopardi (Vice Captain)
5	MF	MLT	Paul Rapa
6	DF	MLT	Owen Grech
7	MF	MLT	Keith Saliba
8	MF	MLT	Daniel Atzori
9	MF	MLT	Joshua Buttigieg
10	MF	BRA	Léo Coca
11	MF	MLT	Oliver Curmi
12	GK	MLT	Giacomo Grech
13	FW	MLT	Matias Camilleri Psaila

No.	Pos.	Nation	Player
14	FW	MLT	Jurgen Portelli
15	DF	MLT	Michael Vella
17	DF	MLT	Samuel Azzopardi
18	MF	MLT	Andre Azzopardi
20	FW	MLT	Neil Said
21	MF	MLT	George Attard
22	FW	POR	André Martins
23	DF	MLT	Jurgen Attard
48	DF	BRA	Luis Gabriel
77	FW	BRA	Rian Lopes
93	GK	MLT	Angelo Brignoli

== Out on Loan ==
Note: Flags indicate national team as defined under FIFA eligibility rules; some limited exceptions apply. Players may hold more than one non-FIFA nationality.

No.	Pos.	Nation	Player
—	DF	MLT	Nicholas Attard (at Munxar Falcons until 08.06.2020)
—	DF	MLT	Savio Saliba (at Munxar Falcons until 08.06.2020)
—	MF	MLT	Francesco Cini (at Zebbuġ Rovers until 08.06.2020)

== Current Coaching staff ==
Manager – (Serbia) Darko

Goalkeeper Coach – (Malta) Victor Agius

Youth Team Manager – (Malta) John Mark Vella

Club Doctor – (Malta) Dr. Christopher Micallef M.D.

Kit Manager – (Malta) Louis Buhagiar

== Current club Officials ==
Club chairman: Mr. Joseph Micallef

Club Secretary: Mr. David Galea

Club Financial Controller: Mr. Mario Scicluna

Members:

Mr. Ryan Cefai Mercieca

Mr. George Farrugia

Mr. Gordon John Grech

Dr. Christopher Micallef M.D.

== Youth Section Honours ==
Under 18

- Under 18 League
  - Champions (1): 2012–2013

Under 14

- APS Under 14 Football League
  - Champions (1): 2008–2009
- APS Under 14 Knock Out Cup
  - Winners (1): 2008-2009
