= S.K. Victoria Wanderers F.C. =

Maltese football club

- Full name: S.K. Victoria Wanderers F.C.
- Nickname: Tas-Savina
- Founded: 1958; 68 years ago
- Ground: Gozo Stadium; Gozo, Malta
- Capacity: 4,000
- Manager: Brian Azzopardi
- Coach: Mark Buttigieg
- League: Gozo Football League First Division
Home colours	Away colours

S.K. Victoria Wanderers Football Club is a Maltese football club from the town of Victoria, Gozo. They were founded in 1958 and have won the Gozo Football League First Division championship once, as Victoria United during the 1978–79 season.

== History ==
The club was founded as Victoria City in 1958 to play in the Second Division of the Gozo Football League; the town of Victoria already had a long tradition in Maltese football through several older defunct clubs and the still present Victoria Hotspurs.

=== Early years ===
Victoria picked up their first piece of silverware during 1962–63 by winning the Gozitan Second Division, they were promoted to the top level of the island's football system. Their name was changed to SK Wanderers in 1963 for their step up to the top league.

After four seasons in the Gozitan First Division, the club were thrown out of the league and banned for two seasons. To get around this, the club refounded as Sabina United for the following season in the Second Division, where they managed to gain promotion straight back into the top division. For their second return to the top division in 1968, they went under the name Victoria Wanderers, but were relegated straight back down.

=== League success ===
This time they stayed for a longer spell in the Second Division, gaining promotion in the 1973–74 season as Victoria United, the league had also been expanded from six clubs, to eleven for a season. However, this was to be a yo-yo time for a club and they bounced between the two leagues during the decade, picking up the Second Division title for the third time in 1977–78.

Victoria United were crowned champions of Gozo in 1978–79, just a year after they had won the Second Division. This is considered the most prestigious title won by the club, being the only time they have finished top in Gozo. It didn't last long for the club however as they were soon bouncing between the leagues again, winning a fourth Second Division title.

=== Recent times ===
During 1991 the name of the club was changed back to one which they had used during the 1960s; SK Victoria Wanderers, the first season back under that name the club won the Second Division. Since winning the Second Division Championship in 07/08, the club have played continually in the First Division, finishing 3rd in 2011/2012.

== Current squad ==
Note: Flags indicate national team as defined under FIFA eligibility rules; some limited exceptions apply. Players may hold more than one non-FIFA nationality.

No.	Pos.	Nation	Player
1	GK	SRB	Mladen Kukrika
2	DF	MLT	Lukas Cini
4	DF	MLT	Neil Camilleri
6	MF	MLT	Kersten Grima
7	FW	BRA	Caíque Souza
8	MF	MLT	Matthias Cordina
9	FW	AUS	Deren Kuru
10	MF	MLT	Emerson Zammit
11	FW	NGA	David Garba
12	GK	ENG	Presley Clarke
13	GK	MLT	Omar Xuereb

No.	Pos.	Nation	Player
14	FW	ENG	Samuel Harland
15	DF	MLT	Nicholas Grech
17	MF	MLT	Aaron Touarha
21	MF	NGA	Agibade Adesina
22	DF	MLT	Tristan Azzopardi
23	DF	MLT	Adam Refalo
24	DF	MLT	Owen Fenech
26	MF	MLT	Nicholas Vella
30	MF	MLT	Luke Fenech
33	DF	PUR	André Cutler
92	FW	BRA	Jose Wilkson

== Honours ==
- Gozo First Division
  - Champions: 1978–1979,
- Gozo Second Division
  - Champions: 1962–1963, 1967–1968, 1977–1978, 1983–1984, 1991–1992, 2007–2008, 2022–23
- GFA Cup
  - Champions: 2008–2009
- Independence Cup
  - 2010–2011
- Freedom Day Cup
  - Champions: 2008–2009
- ESSO Cup
  - Champions: 1964–1965
- Galea Cup
  - Champions: 1965–1966
- Second Division Knock-Out Cup
  - Champions: 1977–1978, 2001–2002, 2002–2003, 2007–2008
- Second Division Challenge Cup
  - Champions: 2006–2007, 2007–2008, 2022–2023
