= Kerċem Ajax F.C. =

Maltese football club

Kerċem Ajax
- Full name: Kerċem Ajax Football Club
- Nickname: The Greens
- Founded: 1953; 73 years ago
- Ground: Kerċem Ajax Stadium
- Capacity: 1000
- Chairman: Elvin Grech
- Coach: Daniel Bogdanović
- League: Gozo First Division
- 2022/23: Gozo First Division, 3rd
- Website: https://kercemajaxfc.com
Home colours	Away colours

Kerċem Ajax Football Club is a Gozitan, Malta, football club from the village of Kerċem, which plays in the Gozo First Division. Kerċem Ajax won the Gozitan Second Division 2011–2012 season with 50 points, an unbeaten season. Ajax won other two competitions in Gozitan football competitions, the Second Division Knock-Out against Munxar Falcons with the score of 2–0 and the Second Division Super Cup against Munxar Falcons with the score of 7–0. Ajax was promoted to Gozo First Division for the season 2012–2013. They beat Nadur Youngsters in 2013 winning the GFA Cup; the whites had the distinction of holding high all Gozo's 5 trophies. The Greens also introduced to the Maltese football players like Alfred Effiong and Jeremiah Ani apart from former international players like Stoyko Sakaliev. The Greens won in 1985 the Gozo First Division and at other times the GFA Cup, GFA Super Cup, Independence Cup and Freedom Day Cup.

== Achievements ==
Gozo First Division Champions: 1985/86 2025/6

1st Division League – Runners Up 3 times: 1980/1981, 2005/2006, 2012/2013

2nd Division League – Champions 5 times: 1953/1954, 1975/1976, 1986/1987, 1999/2000, 2011/2012

2nd Division League – Runners Up 4 times: 1982/1983, 1983/1984, 1984/1985, 1989/1990

1st Division League – Premier League Format – Runners Up 1 time: 1997/1998

2nd Division League – Premier League Format – Champions 1 time: 1996/1997

GFA Cup – Winners 2 times: 2005/2006, 2012/2013

GFA Cup – Runners Up 3 times: 1990/1991, 2000/2001, 2009/2010

1st Division Super Cup – Winners 1 time: 2005/2006

2nd Division Super Cup – Winners 1 time: 2010/2011

1st & 2nd Division Knock Out – Winners 1 time: 1998/1999

1st Division Knock Out – Premier League Format – Runners Up 1 time: 1997/1998, 2013/2014

2nd Division Knock Out – Premier League Format – Winners 1 time: 1996/1997

Independence Cup – Runners Up 2 times: 2004/2005, 2005/2006

2nd Division Knock Out – Winners 3 times: 1978/1979, 1981/1982, 2011/2012

2nd Division Knock Out – Runners Up 1 time: 2010/2011

Isostar Cup – Winners 1 time: 1995/1996

Freedom Day Cup Cup – Runners Up 1 time: 1981/1982

Challenge Cup – Winners 2 times: 1974/1975, 1976/1977

Renton Cup – Winners 1 time: 1985/1986

Good Conduct Cup – Winners 3 times: 1973/1974, 1975/1976, 1981/1982

Dingli's Cup – Runners Up 2 times: 1953/1954, 1956/1957

Under 21 League – Winners 1 time: 2007/2008

Under 18 League – Champions 2 times: 1996/1997, 1997/1998

Under 16 – Champions 1 time: 1999/2000

Under 16 Knock Out – Runners Up 1 time: 2005/2006

Under 14 League – Champions 2 times: 1997/1998, 2003/2004

Under 14 Knock Out – Winners 1 time: 2003/2004

Under 12 League – Runners Up 1 time: 2001/2002

== Administration ==
Position	Name
President	Dr. Elvin Grech
Vice-president	Mr. Albert Camilleri
Vice-president	Mr. Mario Azzopardi
Secretary	Mr. David Depasquale
Assistant Secretary	Mr. Raymond Borg
Treasurer	Ms. Chantelle Sultana
Assistant Treasurer	Mr. Joeseph Vella
Club Administrator	Mr. David Mizzi
Spiritual Director	Fr. Roberto Gauci
Committee Member	Mr. Francis Borg
Committee Member	Mr. George Pace
Committee Member	Mr. Manuel Mercieca
Committee Member	Mr. Martin Formosa
Committee Member	Mr. George Vella
Committee Member	Mr. Mario Spiteri
Committee Member	Mr. Jean Paul Mizzi

== Current staff ==
Position	Name
Head coach	(Malta) Daniel Bogdanovic
Assistant coach	(Serbia) Milos Perisic
Assistant coach	(Serbia) Marko Markovic
Goalkeepers coach	(Malta) Franklin Vella
Team manager	(Malta) Jean Paul Mizzi
Kit manager	(Malta) Christian Attard
Club Physio	(Malta) Andreana Vella

== Players ==
=== Current squad ===
Note: Flags indicate national team as defined under FIFA eligibility rules; some limited exceptions apply. Players may hold more than one non-FIFA nationality.

No.	Pos.	Nation	Player
1	GK	MLT	Daniel Spiteri
2	DF	MLT	Daniel Cassar
4	DF	BRA	Mateus Lima
5	MF	MLT	Dejan Bogdanovic
6	MF	MLT	Jason Theuma
7	FW	BRA	Neném
8	MF	MLT	Ryan Saliba
10	FW	BRA	Juan Leite
11	MF	MLT	Andrew Mizzi (captain)

No.	Pos.	Nation	Player
12	GK	MLT	Franklin Vella
13	MF	MLT	Antonio Xuereb
18	GK	MLT	Jean Paul Mizzi
21	MF	MLT	Andrea Debrincat
22	MF	ITA	Lorenzo Atzori
23	DF	MLT	Andre Azzopardi
24	MF	MLT	Karl Attard
27	DF	MLT	Samuel Azzopardi
33	FW	BRA	Isaías Cruz

=== Out on Loan ===
Note: Flags indicate national team as defined under FIFA eligibility rules; some limited exceptions apply. Players may hold more than one non-FIFA nationality.

No.	Pos.	Nation	Player
—	MF	MLT	Luke Attard at Sannat Lions
—	FW	MLT	Josef Debrincat at St. Lawrence Spurs

Loan deals expire 30 June 2015
