= Gozo Stadium =

Stadium on the island of Gozo, Malta

- Il-Grawnd
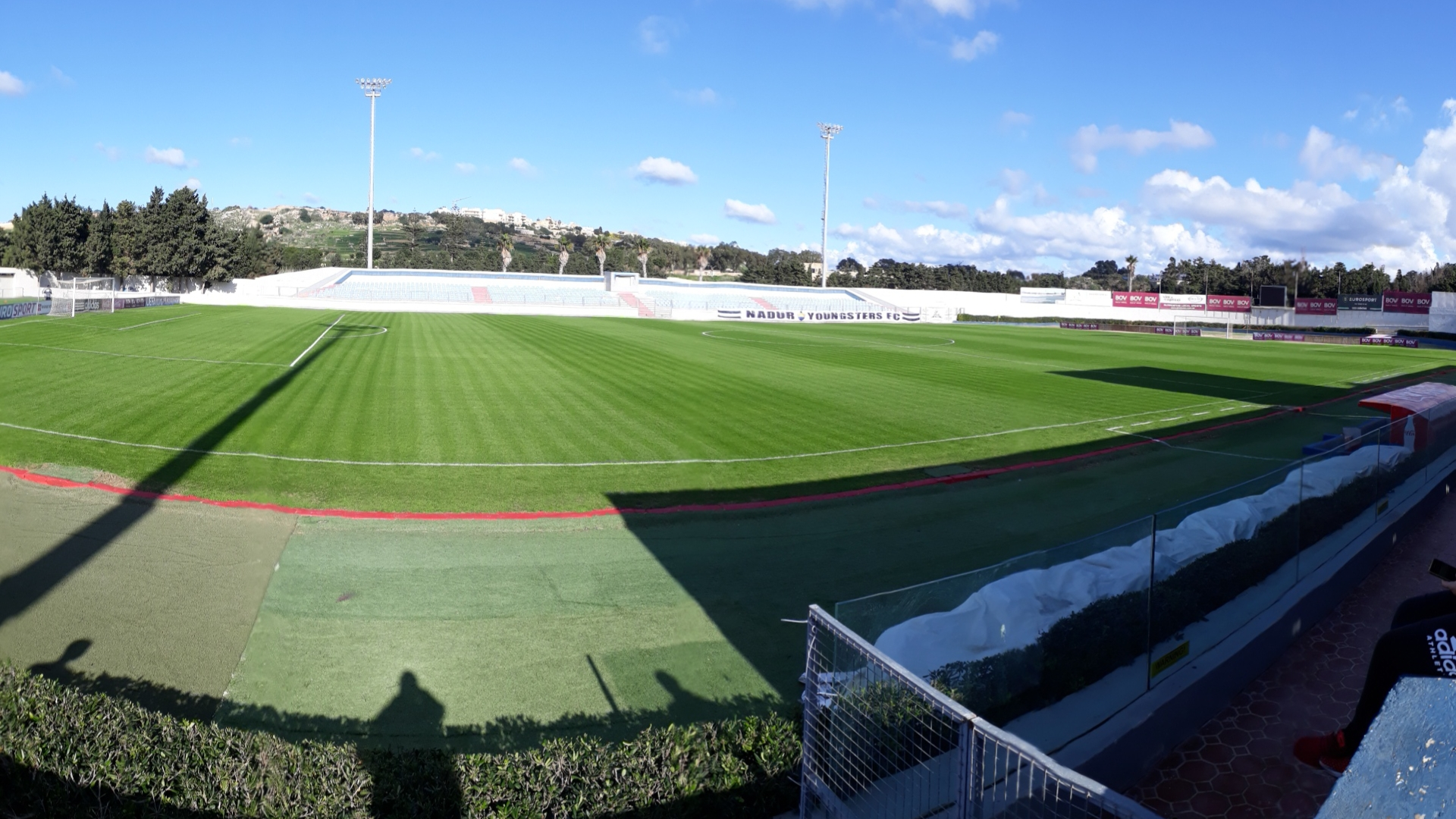
- Interactive map of Gozo Stadium
- Full name: Gozo Stadium
- Former names: Silver Jubilee Ground
- Location: (Malta) Xewkija, Gozo
- Coordinates: 36°2′18″N 14°15′23″E
- Owner: Government of Malta
- Operator: Gozo Football Association
- Capacity: 1,628
- Surface: Grass
- Field size: 102 m x 60 m (335 ft x 197 ft)

Construction
- Opened: 1936
- Renovated: 1995
- Expanded: 1975
- Cost: £819.12s.3d.

Tenants
- Gozo national football team Gozo Football League First Division

The Gozo Stadium (Maltese: Il-Grawnd t'Għawdex), formerly known as the Silver Jubilee Ground, is the main stadium of the island of Gozo, Malta. The Gozo Stadium, which is located in Xewkija, seats only 1,644 people but its standing areas at each end of its main stand ensure that the stadium can hold up to approximately 3,800 people, with 1,628 seated. Similar to National Stadium in Malta, the Gozo Stadium is the main venue of the local top division, the Gozo Football League First Division, and the finals of all cups organised by the Gozo Football Association are generally held at the stadium.

== History ==
=== Early years ===
The stadium was erected in 1936 and as a commemoration of the Silver Jubilee of King George V, the stadium was named the Silver Jubilee Ground. The stadium, which originally comprised only what is now referred to as the Xewkija Stand, cost 819 pounds, 12 shillings and 3 pence to build. A number of amenities, namely a boundary wall around the ground, dressing rooms, toilets and a bar, were added two years later.

In 1975, the stadium was expanded through the construction of an opposite stand, commonly referred to as the Xaghra Stand, and in 1995 the surface of the pitch was converted to natural turf and the stadium was renamed to Gozo Stadium At that time, the stadium was rather unique in Gozo as all other pitches had sandy surfaces. The sandy surfaces have almost all gone now but the fact that these have been replaced with synthetic turf surfaces ensures that Gozo Stadium's distinction in being the only stadium in Gozo having a natural turf pitch remains intact to this day.

=== Recent years ===
In January 2007, the stadium was illuminated by floodlights for the first time as the erection of a floodlight at each corner ensured that the Gozo Stadium could also host football matches after dusk as well. Three years after, and in anticipation of Gozo's hosting of the VIVA World Cup, the stadium was subject to another investment. The project, which cost around €340k entailed the construction of a complex behind one of the goals. The complex includes offices, four dressing rooms, two rooms for the use of referees, new toilet facilities and a garage. In 2011, the stadium was improved through the laying of a new five-a-side pitch and the construction of a parking space catering for 75 vehicles.

In 2013, and with the UEFA European Under-17 Championship in the horizon, the Government allocated €500k to fund the improvement of football grounds around the island of Gozo. The Gozo Stadium was one of the beneficiaries as part of the budget was used to fund the development of further facilities at the Gozo Stadium, particularly a state-of-the art VIP Area at the enclosure.

== Description ==
The Gozo Stadium is located at Mgarr Road, the main road connecting Xewkija to Victoria. It comprises two stands on each side of the pitch. The enclosure, the larger of the two, is situated on Xewkija's side and, almost by default, is referred to as the Xewkija Side. The stand, which is sliced in two by the VIP Area, is all seated and covered under a roof. Moreover, a standing area together with a bar is located at the end of each side of the stand. Opposite to the Xewkija Side is the Xaghra Side. As suggestive by its name, it is located on Xaghra's side and aesthetically speaking the stand consists of a stand running alongside the pitch, with a bar located right at the middle. The Xaghra Side is not covered from the elements and is only opened when the stadium hosts important matches and hence hundreds are expected to turn up. Both stands are accessible from Mgarr Road.

== Events ==
=== UEFA European Under-19 Championship ===
The Gozo Stadium will be one of the four stadiums which will be used during the Maltese hosting of the 2023 UEFA European Under-19 Championship. The stadium will host 2 group matches in all, including the match between the hosts and Portugal.

=== UEFA European Under-17 Championship ===
The Gozo Stadium was one of the three stadiums used during the Maltese hosting of the 2014 UEFA European Under-17 Championship. The stadium hosted 4 group matches in all.

=== UEFA Regions' Cup ===
Aback of the Malta Football Association's decision to have a Gozitan side representing Malta during the 2013, 2015 and 2017 editions of the UEFA Regions Cup and consequent to UEFA's decision for Malta to host the group matches in which Gozo was drawn in all three editions, the Gozo Stadium also hosted the nine matches played during the Intermediary Round of the three editions in question.

=== Maltese Premier League ===
Up to 2011, Gozo was also used to be represented in the Maltese football league system by Gozo FC. The highest point of the club's history was its promotion to the Maltese Premier League by winning the 1998/1999 edition of the Maltese First Division. All Gozo FC's home matches during their only season in the highest echelon of the Maltese football were played at the Gozo Stadium.

=== 2010 Viva World Cup ===
The Gozo Stadium was one of the two venues to host the 2010 edition of the Viva World Cup. Besides the opening ceremony, the stadium hosted five matches in all, namely three group stage matches, a semi-final and the final between Iraqi Kurdistan and the eventual winners Padania.

== See also ==
- List of football stadiums in Malta
