= Għajnsielem F.C. =

Maltese football club

- Full name: Għajnsielem Football Club
- Nickname: The Blacks
- Short name: GĦJ
- Founded: 1936; 90 years ago
- Ground: Fr. Karm Cassar
- President: Joe Debono
- Head Coach: Elton Vella
- League: Gozo First Division
- 2026–27: Gozo First Division,
- Website: https://www.facebook.com/ghajnsielem.fc/
Home colours	Away colours

Għajnsielem Football Club is a football club from the Maltese island of Gozo, in the village of Għajnsielem. They are the oldest-still-active club in Gozo and was founded in 1936. The club has won the Gozo Football League First Division seven times.

== Squad ==
Note: Flags indicate national team as defined under FIFA eligibility rules; some limited exceptions apply. Players may hold more than one non-FIFA nationality.

No.	Pos.	Nation	Player
1	GK	MLT	Luca Grima
2	DF	MLT	Nathan Chukwudi Njoku
4	MF	MLT	Alberto Xuereb (Captain)
5	DF	MLT	Ian Xuereb
6	DF	MLT	Wayne Hili
7	MF	MLT	Naim Ibrahim Belhadj
8	MF	MLT	Joseph Xerri
9	FW	MLT	Decon Attard
10	MF	BRA	Tom Tom
12	GK	MLT	Luca Farrugia
14	MF	MLT	Jake Xuereb
15	MF	MLT	Dylan Mercieca
16	DF	MLT	Lucas Tabone

No.	Pos.	Nation	Player
17	FW	COL	Duvan Mosquera Torres
18	MF	MLT	Stefan Cassar
19	FW	MLT	Joshua Buttigieg
20	MF	BRA	Elizeu Bahia
21	MF	MLT	Paul Vella
22	MF	MLT	Mark Scicluna
25	DF	COL	Daniel Murillo
27	DF	ESP	Chechu Meneses
29	DF	ARG	Gabriel Mannino
33	GK	MLT	Richard Sammut
70	FW	VEN	Jhon Gonzalez
77	FW	BRA	Renan Farias
88	MF	BRA	Bruno Da Cruz
99	GK	MLT	Owen Attard

== Current Staff ==
Position	Name
Head coach	(Malta) Elton Vella
Assistant coach	(Malta) Xavier Saliba
Goalkeepers coach	(England) Simon Horne
Team manager	(Malta) Charlie Azzopardi
Kit manager	(Malta) Jonathon Sultana

Position	Name
President	Mr. Joe Debono
Vice-president	Mr. Angel Theuma
Secretary	Mr. Clint Azzopardi
Assistant Secretary	Mr. Silvano Spiteri
Treasurer	Mr. Sergio Mallia
Assistant Treasurer	Mr. Ryan Mifsud
Spiritual Director	Fr. Joseph Hili
Committee Member	Mr. James Said
Committee Member	Mr. Mario Xuereb
Committee Member	Mr. Larry Azzopardi

== Honours ==
- Gozo Football League
  - Champions (7): 1969–70, 1970–71, 1971–72, 1972–73, 1973–74, 2004–05, 2015–16
- G.F.A. Cup
  - Winners (6): 1973–74, 1986–87, 2000–01, 2002–03, 2006–07, 2016–17
- Independence Cup
  - Winners (6): 1965–66, 1969–70, 1970–71, 1971–72, 1987–88, 2002–03
- Zammit Cup
  - Winners (1): 1936
- Freedom Day Cup
  - Winners (2): 2000-01, 2005–06
- GFA Super Cup
  - Winners (5): 1998–99, 2000–01, 2001–02, 2003–04, 2022–23
- Gozo Football League Second Division
  - Champions (5): 1963–64, 1965–66, 1981–82, 1984–85, 2014–15
