= Nadur Youngsters F.C. =

Maltese football club

Nadur Youngsters
- Full name: Nadur Youngsters Football Club
- Nicknames: The Whites, The Youngsters
- Founded: 1958; 68 years ago
- Ground: Peter Paul Camilleri Pitch (Artificial Turf)
- President: Darren Portelli
- Head Coach: Daniel Portelli
- League: Gozo Football League Second Division
- 2025/2026: 7th
- Website: https://www.nadur-youngstersfc.com
Home colours	Away colours

Nadur Youngsters Football Club is a Maltese football Club from the village of Nadur, on the island of Gozo.

The club was founded in 1958 and won the Gozo Football League 15 times and has achieved the Golden Star for sports excellence. It currently competes in the Gozo Football League Second Division.

== Achievements ==
- League

Winners (15): 1967/68, 1994/95, 1995/96, 1996/97, 1998/99, 2001/02, 2002/03, 2005/06, 2006/07, 2007/08, 2012/13, 2019/20, 2021/22, 2022/23, 2023/24

- Independence Cup

Winners (11): 1967/68, 1989/90, 1993/94, 1994/95, 1995/96, 2001/02, 2004/05, 2005/06, 2006/07, 2007/08, 2012/13

- Gozo FA Cup

Winners (11): 1987/88, 1992/93, 1993/94, 1994/95, 1995/96, 2003/04, 2010/11, 2013/14, 2021/22, 2022/23, 2024/25

- Super Cup

Winners (9): 1993/94, 1994/95, 1997/98, 2002/03, 2006/07, 2012/13, 2013/14, 2019/20, 2023/24

- Freedom Day Cup

Winners (5): 2001/02, 2002/03, 2004/05, 2006/07, 2012/13

- 1st Division K.O Cup

Winners (3): 2014/15, 2021/22, 2022/23

- Galea Cup

Winners (3): 1961/62, 1963/64, 1964/65

- Esso Cup

Winners (2): 1962/63, 1969/70

- Republic Cup

Winners (1): 1997/98

- Noel Vassallo Cup

Winners (1): 2002/03

- Premier Cup

Winners (1): 1996/97

- British American Insurance Cup

Winners (1): 1972/73

- Air Malta Cup

Winners (1): 1995/96

- 2nd Division League Champions

Winners (1): 1989/90

- 2nd Division K.O. Cup

Winners (1): 1989/90

== Club officials and coaching staff ==
- President: Darren Portelli
- Vice President: Joe Camilleri
- Secretary: Franklyn Sultana
- Treasurer: Marjohn Xuereb
- Kit Manager: Nicholas Mifsud
- Team Manager: Joseph Said
- Doctor: Mario Saliba
- Manager: Daniel Portelli
- Sponsor: Joseph Portell
- Events: Paul Azzopardi, Jean Paul Portelli, Nicholas Galea, Christian Mifsud
- Academy Manager: Mario Bonello

== Recent seasons ==
Year	Division	Position
1999–2000	Gozo Football League	3rd
2000–01	Gozo Football League	2nd
2001–02	Gozo Football League	1st
2002–03	Gozo Football League	1st
2003–04	Gozo Football League	2nd
2004–05	Gozo Football League	4th
2005–06	Gozo Football League	1st
2006–07	Gozo Football League	1st
2007–08	Gozo Football League	1st
2008–09	Gozo Football League	5th
2009–10	Gozo Football League	3rd
2010–11	Gozo Football League	3rd
2011–12	Gozo Football League	2nd
2012–13	Gozo Football League	1st
2013–14	Gozo Football League	3rd
2014–15	Gozo Football League	2nd (*Relegated)
2015–16	Gozo Football League Second Division	2nd
2016–17	Gozo Football League	2nd
2017–18	Gozo Football League	2nd
2018–19	Gozo Football League	2nd
2019–20	Gozo Football League	1st
2020–21	Gozo Football League	NIL COVID-19 Pandemic
2021–22	Gozo Football League	1st
2022–23	Gozo Football League	1st
2023–24	Gozo Football League	1st
2024–25	Gozo Football League	2nd
2025- 2026	Gozo Football League	7th (Relegated)

== Current squad ==
As of 8 August 2026

Note: Flags indicate national team as defined under FIFA eligibility rules; some limited exceptions apply. Players may hold more than one non-FIFA nationality.

No.	Pos.	Nation	Player
1	GK	MLT	Zak Vella
94	GK	MLT	Francesco Portelli
25	GK	MLT	Steven Meilak
12	GK	MLT	Duane Bugeja
3	DF	MLT	Manuel Tabone
13	DF	MLT	Josef Buttigieg
44	DF	MLT	Karl Hili
4	DF	MLT	Pierre Camilleri
30	DF	MLT	Carlo Farrugia
19	DF	MLT	Peter Muscat
5	DF	MLT	Jake Attard
15	DF	MLT	Joseph Portelli
23	DF	MLT	Kyle Xuereb
18	DF	MLT	Riley Vella
10	MF	MLT	Kurt Xuereb
8	MF	MLT	Neil Mifsud (C)
6	MF	MLT	Chris Debono
14	MF	MLT	Leander Buttigieg
17	MF	MLT	Mason Portelli
21	MF	MLT	Nathan Attard
29	MF	MLT	Gilbert Portelli
7	FW	MLT	Matthias Mercieca
9	FW	BRA	Claudir Marini
11	FW	MLT	Sylvan Xuereb
22	FW	MLT	Neil Mercieca

== Presidential history ==
Name	Season
1958–1961	Joseph S. Attard
1961–1965	Peter Paul Camilleri
1965–1966	Joseph F. Zerafa
1966–1967	Angelo J. Curmi
1967–1974	Peter Paul Camilleri
1974–1984	Joseph P. Attard
1984–1988	Peter Paul Buttigieg
1988–1989	Joseph C. Muscat
1989–1990	Joseph S. Xuereb
1990–1991	Francis X. Azzopardi
1991–1995	Peter Paul Camilleri
1995–1996	Sammy Grech
1996–1997	Joe Camilleri Muscat
1997	Joe Camilleri Galea
1997–1998	Paul Sultana
1998–2000	Joe Portelli
2000–2001	Eucharist Camilleri
2001–2002	Paul Meilak
2002–2004	Joseph Portelli
2004–2005	Peter Hili
2005–2017	Eucharist Camilleri
2017–2020	Joseph Portelli
2020–2023	Tristen Portelli
2023–2025	Chris Said
2025– 2026	Frank Sciberras
2026–	Darren Portelli
