= List of airports in Malta =

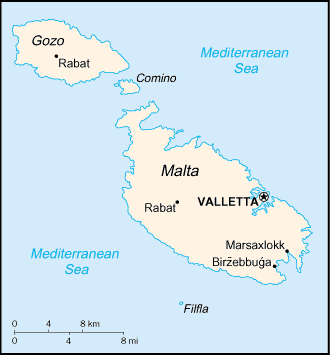
Map of Malta

This is a list of airports in Malta.

== Airports ==
Airports shown in bold have scheduled passenger service on commercial airlines.

Location	ICAO	IATA	Airport name	Coordinates	Reference
Luqa / Gudja	LMML	MLA	**Malta International Airport** (Luqa Airport)	35°51′27″N 014°28′39″E	
Xewkija	LMMG	GZM	Xewkija Heliport (Gozo Heliport)	36°01′38″N 014°16′19″E	
Comino		JCO	Comino heliport	36°0′36.1″N 14°20′50.5″E	
Pieta			Saint Luke's Hospital heliport	35°53′44.16″N 14°27′56.88″E	

== Abandoned airports ==
- Safi
- Ħal Far
- Ta' Qali
- Qrendi
- Calafrana
- Marsa

== See also ==
- Transport in Malta
- List of airports by ICAO code: L#LM – Malta
- Wikipedia:WikiProject Aviation/Airline destination lists: Europe#Malta
