= List of windmills in Malta =

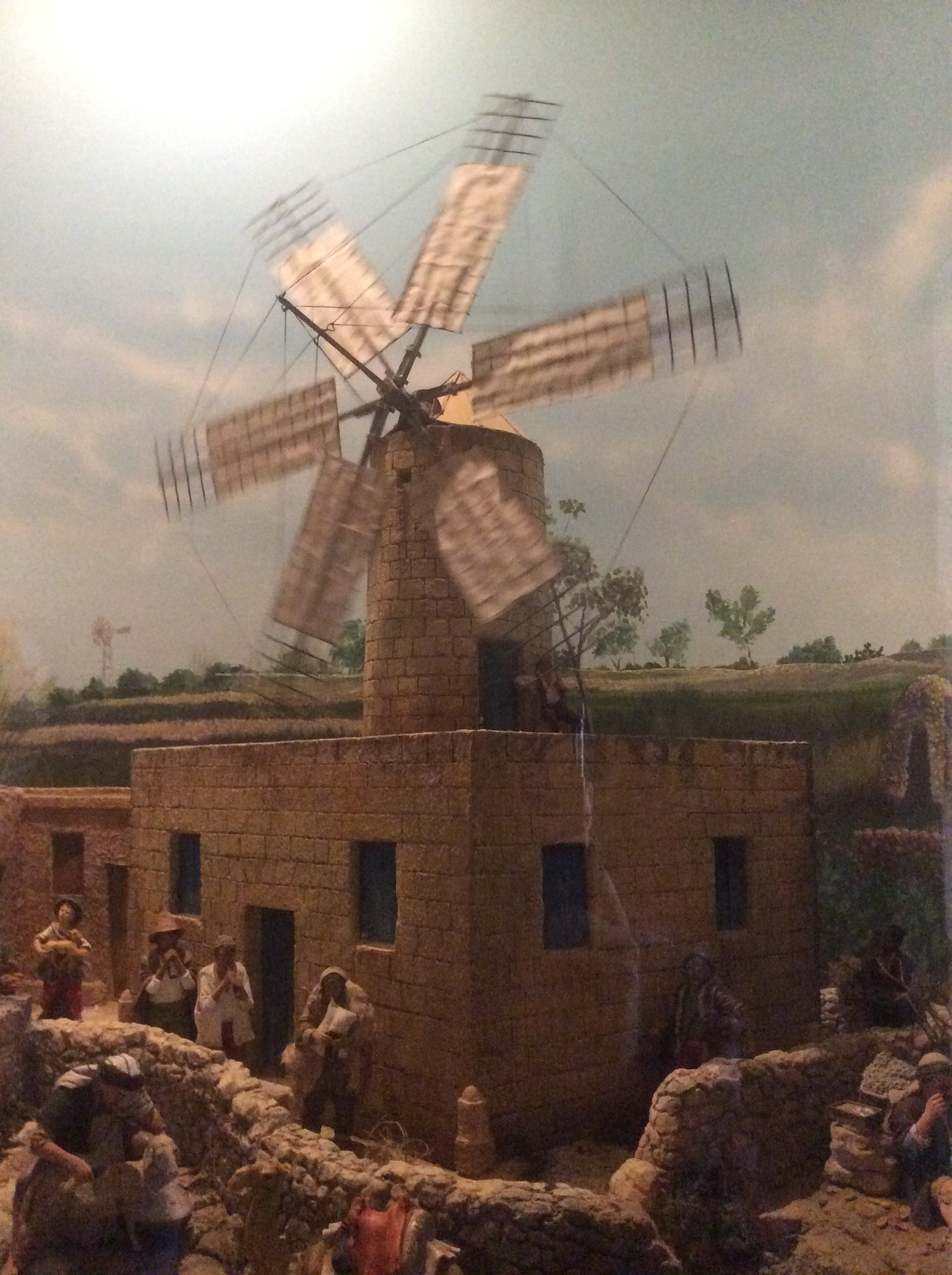
A model of a traditional Maltese windmill at Montekristo Estates

This is a list of windmills in Malta, that include those on Malta and Gozo. Most windmills (Maltese: imtieħen tar-riħ) in Malta were built while the islands were under the rule of the Order of St. John, by the Cottoner and the Manoel Foundations, while other were built in the British Colonial period. There are 48 windmills (apart from those demolished that would add up to at least 69) which were included on the antiques list of 1932 and scheduled as cultural buildings by the Malta Environment and Planning Authority (MEPA). The windmills form an integral part of Maltese history. Those in the countryside were used exclusively for food production, such as wheat, barley or vines, while some of those within the fortified walled cities in Valletta and the Three Cities had a military use, for the production of gunpowder.

At the time of construction, each windmills' tower could site the next windmill from distance, similar to military watchtowers, in order to learn whether the others are working on that day. An instrument called bronja, colloquially known as tronga, is commonly associated with the functioning of windmills. The tronja is a sea snail that is modified, with a hole at one end, and when blown it creates a strong noise reaching a large distance in a given Maltese village. This was useful to inform the people that the windmills are operating that day due to being a windy day, by which the sails turn for general function.

The architecture of a windmill could differ from one to another, but in general a Maltese windmill has similar characteristics. A tower has a built circular staircase inside it that leads to the top. Rooms are built around the tower, giving both support to the tower and used for the general storage of production. A windmill could simultaneously be the family residence of the miller. Each tower has an approximate height of 15 meters and a radius of 1.5 meters. A functioning Maltese windmill has six sails. The first mills were built in the 16th century, however these were post mills. The oldest tower mills were built in the late 17th century on the island of Malta while the latest were built on Gozo in the late 19th or early 20th centuries. The windmills were eventually replaced with the industrial development of steam mills, circa 1900, but managed to keep competitive production throughout the mid-twentieth century.

Malta has the highest density of windmills in the world, having approximately a windmill for each 9 km^{2} (3.5 sq mi), which is higher than the Netherlands which is famous for its windmills. At one point there were more than the present amount of windmills on the islands, but many were demolished over the years. Despite the survival of a significant number of windmills, only three still have their sails in place. Other more traditional mills in Malta include those that made use of animals, such as horses and donkeys, to turn the mill.

== List ==
=== Malta ===
Location	Name of mill (Note: If a windmill is known by several names, all are listed here.) and coordinates	Type	Built	Notes	Photograph
Birkirkara	Għar il-Ġobon Windmill; 35°54′12.9″N 14°27′59.1″E	Tower	c. 1685	Built by Gregorio Carafa. Remained in use until 1930, and sails were subsequently removed. Converted into a house.	
Birkirkara	Mrieħel Windmill; 35°53′34.6″N 14°27′42.9″E	Tower	c. 1685	Built by Gregorio Carafa, and possibly rebuilt in 1807. Remained in use until 1886. The base still exist while the mill’s parts were sold out in 1889. It has been a residence since then.	
Birkirkara	Ta' Ganu Windmill; 35°53′59.9″N 14°27′21.5″E	Tower	1724	Built by the Manoel Foundation. Contains a niche of St. Michael. Remained in use until 1929, and sails were subsequently removed. Later used as a blacksmith's workshop. Restored in 1985–89 and converted into an artist's studio.	
Birkirkara	Ta' Triq San Ġiljan Windmill; 35°54′7.5″N 14°28′17.3″E	Tower	1855	Remained in use until 1900. Tower demolished and base converted into a house.	
Cospicua	San Ġwann t'Għuxa Windmill; 35°52′44″N 14°31′7.7″E	Tower	1674	Built by the Cottoner Foundation. Remained in use until 1879. Sails removed.	
Cospicua	Santa Margherita Windmills; 35°53′0.2″N 14°31′28.7″E	Tower	1674	2 side-by-side windmills built by the Cottoner Foundation. One remained in use until c. 1916. Sails removed. Its mechanism was used to restore the Xarolla Windmill.	
Floriana	Saint Francis Ravelin/Sarria Street Windmill 1	Tower	c. 1670	Built by the Cottoner Foundation. Demolished.	
Floriana	Saint Francis Ravelin/Sarria Street Windmill 2	Tower	c. 1670	Built by the Cottoner Foundation. Demolished.	
Floriana	Robert Samut Square Windmill	Tower		Demolished.	
Għargħur	Għargħur Windmill; 35°55′31.6″N 14°27′7.5″E	Tower	1838	Remained in use until c. 1910, and sails were subsequently removed. Converted into a house.	
Gudja	Gudja Windmill	Tower	c. 1670	Built by the Cottoner Foundation. Demolished in 1930.	
Kirkop	Kirkop Windmill	Tower		Demolished, no details known.	
Lija	Tal-Mirakli Windmill / Tal-Għadiriet il-Bordi Windmill; 35°53′50.9″N 14°26′21.9″E	Tower	1674	Built by the Cottoner Foundation. Has a round base. Remained in use until 1889, and sails were subsequently removed. Later used as a blacksmith's forge. Restored in 1991–92 and used for socio-cultural activities.	
Luqa	Ta' Caraffa Windmill; 35°51′23.3″N 14°29′17.4″E	Tower	c. 1684	Probably built by Giovanni Paolo Lascaris or Gregorio Carafa. Remained in use until c. 1889, and pulled down in July 1943. Rebuilt after World War II but demolished again in c. 1985.	
Mellieħa	Windmill near Salib tal-Pellegrini; 35°57′23.6″N 14°21′54.1″E	Tower	Late 17th century Rebuilt 1849	Sails removed in 1938. Now used as a restaurant known as Il-Mitħna Restaurant.	
Mellieħa	Il-Qadima Windmill; 35°57′15.4″N 14°21′50.3″E	Tower	c. 1843	Remained in use until c. 1920. Tower demolished and base converted to a house.	
Mellieħa	Il-Ġdida Windmill	Tower	c. 1849	Demolished, exact location unknown.	
Mosta	Jesus of Nazareth Windmill / Il-Qadima Windmill; 35°54′15.5″N 14°25′34.5″E	Tower	c. 1685; Rebuilt 1757	Façade bears the coat of arms of Gregorio Carafa (reigned 1680–90). It was rebuilt in 1757 by the architect Francesco Zerafa and master mason Nicola Camilleri, and this is commemorated by an inscription below the coat of arms. Remained in use until 1925, and sails were removed in c. 1928.	
Mosta	Il-Ġdida Windmill; 35°54′19.2″N 14°25′32.6″E	Tower	c. 1800	Contains a niche of St. Anthony of Padua. Remained in use until 1979, and sails were subsequently removed. Converted into a house.	
Mosta	Ta' Triq San Silvestru Windmill; 35°54′14.6″N 14°25′24.8″E	Tower	c. 1800	Tower demolished and base converted into a house.	
Mosta	Our Lady of Mount Carmel Windmill; 35°54′25.6″N 14°25′46.9″E	Tower	1858	Tower demolished, base used as a shop.	
Mqabba	Tar-Rith Windmill / Mqabba Windmill; 35°50′34.8″N 14°27′54.5″E	Tower	c. 1873	Sails removed c. 1890. Converted into a house.	
Naxxar	Tas-Sgħajtar Windmill; 35°54′49″N 14°26′12.4″E	Tower	c. 1670	Built by the Cottoner Foundation. Sails removed and converted into a house.	
Naxxar	Tal-Għaqba Windmill; 35°54′36.5″N 14°26′43.9″E	Tower	c. 1710	Built by Ramon Perellos y Roccaful. Sails removed c. 1960 but most of the machinery is still present. Partially restored in 2002. Converted into a house.	
Naxxar	Tad-Dejf Windmill / Darnino Windmill; 35°54′50.7″N 14°26′23.4″E	Tower	18th century	Sails removed and converted into a house.	
Naxxar	Santa Luċija Windmill; 35°54′55.1″N 14°26′32.1″E	Tower	18th century	Sails removed and converted into a house and studio.	
Naxxar	Tal-Laqx Windmill; 35°55′6.8″N 14°26′55.1″E	Tower	c. 1730	Built by the Manoel Foundation. Contains a niche. Sails removed and converted into a house.	
Paola	Paola Windmill	Tower		Demolished.	
Qormi	Tal-Erwieħ Windmill / Ta' Pampalaw Windmill; 35°53′2.4″N 14°28′25.4″E	Tower	c. 1685	Sails removed.	
Qrendi	Qrendi Windmill; 35°50′21.2″N 14°27′44.6″E	Tower	c. 1695	Built by Gregorio Carafa. Sails removed.	
Rabat	Ħal Bajjada Windmill; 35°52′46.7″N 14°23′42.3″E	Tower	c. 1685	Built by Gregorio Carafa. Façade bears an eroded coat of arms. Sails removed and converted into a house.	
Rabat	Taċ-Ċagħki Windmill; 35°52′41.9″N 14°23′53.4″E	Tower	18th century	Sails removed and converted into a house.	
Rabat	Ta' Għeriexem Windmill / Tal-Balla Windmill; 35°52′59.9″N 14°23′54.6″E	Tower	c. 1730	Built by the Manoel Foundation. Sails removed and converted into a house.	
Senglea	Senglea Windmill 1; 35°53′24.2″N 14°30′53″E	Post	c. 1536	Probably the first windmill to be built in Malta. Existed during the Great Siege of Malta of 1565. Demolished.	
Senglea	Senglea Windmill 2; 35°53′23.2″N 14°30′54″E	Post	c. 1565	Probably the second windmill to be built in Malta. Existed during the Great Siege of Malta of 1565. Demolished.	
Siġġiewi	Tat-Tank Windmill; 35°51′22.4″N 14°26′7″E	Tower	18th century	Sails removed. At one point it was converted into a water tower.	
Siġġiewi	Ta' Kerċeppu Windmill; 35°51′30.8″N 14°26′31″E	Tower	c. 1800	Sails removed.	
Siġġiewi	Ta' Barba Zepp Windmill; 35°51′16.1″N 14°26′3.3″E	Tower	1879	Built by Joseph Sammut. Remained in use until the 1930s, and the sails were removed in c. 1940. Converted into a house.	
Tarxien		Tower		Tower demolished and base used as a store room.	
Valletta	St. Michael's Bastion Windmill 1; 35°53′56.6″N 14°30′27.2″E	Tower	1674	Built by the Cottoner Foundation. Demolished before 1900.	
Valletta	St. Michael's Bastion Windmill 2; 35°53′56.8″N 14°30′28.8″E	Tower	1674	Built by the Cottoner Foundation. Demolished before 1900.	
Valletta	Saint Elmo Windmill	Tower		Demolished.	
Żabbar	Bir Għeliem Windmill / Ta' Buleben Windmill; 35°52′10.8″N 14°31′37.8″E	Tower	c. 1710	Built by Ramon Perellos y Roccaful. Used as a redoubt in 1798–1800. Sails removed and converted into a house.	
Żabbar	Ħaż-Żabbar Windmill; 35°52′23.1″N 14°32′0.7″E	Tower	19th century	Sails removed and converted into a house.	
Żebbuġ	Tal-Għodor Windmill; 35°52′15.2″N 14°26′4.2″E	Tower	1674–82	Remained in use until c. 1900. Sails removed and converted into a house.	
Żebbuġ	Ta' Ċanfut/Qanfut Windmill; 35°52′28.4″N 14°27′23.6″E	Tower	c. 1680	Built by the Cottoner Foundation. Remained in use until 1884. Was later used as an abattoir and a lime kiln. Tower demolished and base converted into a house.	
Żebbuġ	Ta' Srina Windmill; 35°52′44.2″N 14°26′21.4″E	Tower	c. 1685	Remained in use until c. 1900. Sails removed and tower reduced in height. Converted into a house.	
Żebbuġ	Ta' Għasfura Windmill; 35°52′28″N 14°26′23.3″E	Tower	1858	Remained in use until 1865. Sails removed and tower reduced in height. Converted into a house.	
Żebbuġ	Ta' Kustanz Windmill; 35°52′22.3″N 14°26′21.4″E	Tower	1872	Remained in use until c. 1900, and sails subsequently removed. Converted into a house.	
Żejtun		Tower	c. 1670	Built by the Cottoner Foundation. Demolished.	
Żejtun	Bir id-Deheb Windmill; 35°51′5.3″N 14°31′35.2″E	Tower	c. 1724	Built by the Manoel Foundation. Demolished c. 1960.	
Żejtun		Tower		Demolished.	
Żurrieq	Tal-Qaret Windmill / Nigret Windmill; 35°49′25″N 14°28′7.9″E	Tower	1674	Built by the Cottoner Foundation. Has a round base. Sails removed.	
Żurrieq	Xarolla Windmill; 35°49′54.5″N 14°28′50.5″E	Tower	1724	Built by the Manoel Foundation. Restored a number of times, and is one of the few windmills in Malta which are preserved in working order. Open to the public as a museum.	
Żurrieq	Ta' Marmara Windmill; 35°49′27.4″N 14°28′10.7″E	Tower	c. 1800	Sails removed.	
Żurrieq	St. James Windmill / Tas-Salib Windmill; 35°49′45.7″N 14°28′27.5″E	Tower	1857	Built by the Gafà family. Remained in use until 1938 and sails removed in c. 1945.	

=== Gozo ===
Location	Name of mill and coordinates	Type	Built	Notes	Photograph
Fontana	Ta' Randu Windmill / Ix-Xagħri Windmill; 36°2′28.8″N 14°14′5.6″E	Tower	c. 1856	Sails removed.	
Għarb	Ta' Borom Windmill / Għarb Windmill; 36°3′26.7″N 14°12′40.4″E	Tower	1862	Sails removed c. 1900.	
Għasri		Tower	1858	Built by Luigi Camilleri and consisted of a wooden tower. Destroyed during a whirlwind in c. 1939.	
Għasri		Tower	1859	Built by Giuseppe Grech. Demolished.	
Kerċem	Tal-Qasam Windmill / Ta' Bejn Kerċem u l-Għarb Windmill; 36°3′6.1″N 14°13′26.3″E	Tower	1724; Rebuilt 1784	Originally built by the Manoel Foundation, but was poorly constructed and was rebuilt in 1784. Sails removed and converted to a farmhouse.	
Kerċem	Santa Luċija Windmill; 36°2′33″N 14°13′7.9″E	Tower	1885	Sails removed.	
Nadur		Tower	1727	Built by the Manoel Foundation. This windmill was poorly constructed, and it was demolished in c. 1787. Il-Ġdida Windmill was built in another location to replace it.	
Nadur	Il-Ġdida Windmill; 36°2′17.2″N 14°17′23″E	Tower	1787	Sails removed.	
Qala	Ta' Randu Windmill / Qala Windmill; 36°2′19.1″N 14°18′40.4″E	Tower	1853	Built by the Camilleri brothers. Remained in use until 1977.	
Qala	Ta' Sufa Windmill; 36°2′15.1″N 14°18′26.9″E	Tower	1853	Built by the Camilleri brothers. Currently in poor condition.	
Sannat	Ta' Randu Windmill; 36°1′40.4″N 14°14′32.1″E	Tower	c. 1860	Built by the Cammilleri brothers. Remained in use until c. 1900, and sails were removed in c. 1940. It was subsequently used as a limekiln, and its tower was shortened.	
Victoria	Windmill; 36°2′30.4″N 14°14′24.5″E	Tower	c. 1680	Probably the first windmill to be built on Gozo. Built by Gregorio Carafa. Demolished in 1781 and replaced by the Ta' Marżiena Windmill.	
Victoria	Ta' Marżiena Windmill; 36°2′6.8″N 14°14′24.5″E	Tower	1783	Sails removed.	
Victoria	Għajn Qatet Windmill / Ta' Fortun Windmill; 36°2′27.3″N 14°14′36.6″E	Tower	1856	Sails removed.	
Xagħra	Il-Qadima Windmill	Tower	c. 1725–31	This windmill was poorly constructed, and it was demolished in c. 1787. Ta' Kola Windmill was built in another location to replace it.	
Xagħra	Ta' Kola Windmill; 36°2′59.3″N 14°16′0.5″E	Tower	1787	Remained in use until 1960. Restored a number of times, and is one of the few windmills in Malta which are preserved in working order. Open to the public as a museum.	
Xagħra	Tal-Bwier Windmill / Ta' Ġnien Xibla Windmill; 36°3′7.2″N 14°16′16″E	Tower	1858	Remained in use until 1944 and sails subsequently removed. Converted into a holiday home.	
Xagħra		Tower	c. 1900; Relocated c. 1940	Possibly the last windmill to be built in the Maltese Islands. Built by Fortun Bonello. His son George Bonello dismantled it in c. 1940 and rebuilt it a few kilometres away. It was demolished in c. 1960.	
Xewkija	Tat-Tmien Kantunieri Windmill; 36°2′9.4″N 14°15′36.9″E	Tower	c. 1710	Built by Ramon Perellos y Roccaful. Has an octagonal base. Remained in use until it burnt down in 1886.	
Żebbuġ		Tower	c. 1859	Probably built by Galent Vella. Tower demolished but base survives.	
Żebbuġ		Tower	c. 1870	Demolished c. 1900.	
