= GZM =

GZM may refer to:

- Gour Malda railway station (Indian Railways station code: GZM), a railway station in West Bengal, India
- Metropolis GZM, a metropolitan association composed of 41 contiguous municipalities in the Katowice metropolitan area, Poland
- Xewkija Heliport (IATA: GZM), a small heliport on the island of Gozo in Malta
- Guangzhou Metro, commonly abbreviated as GZM
