= No. 112 Squadron RAF =

Defunct flying squadron of the Royal Air Force

No. 112 Squadron
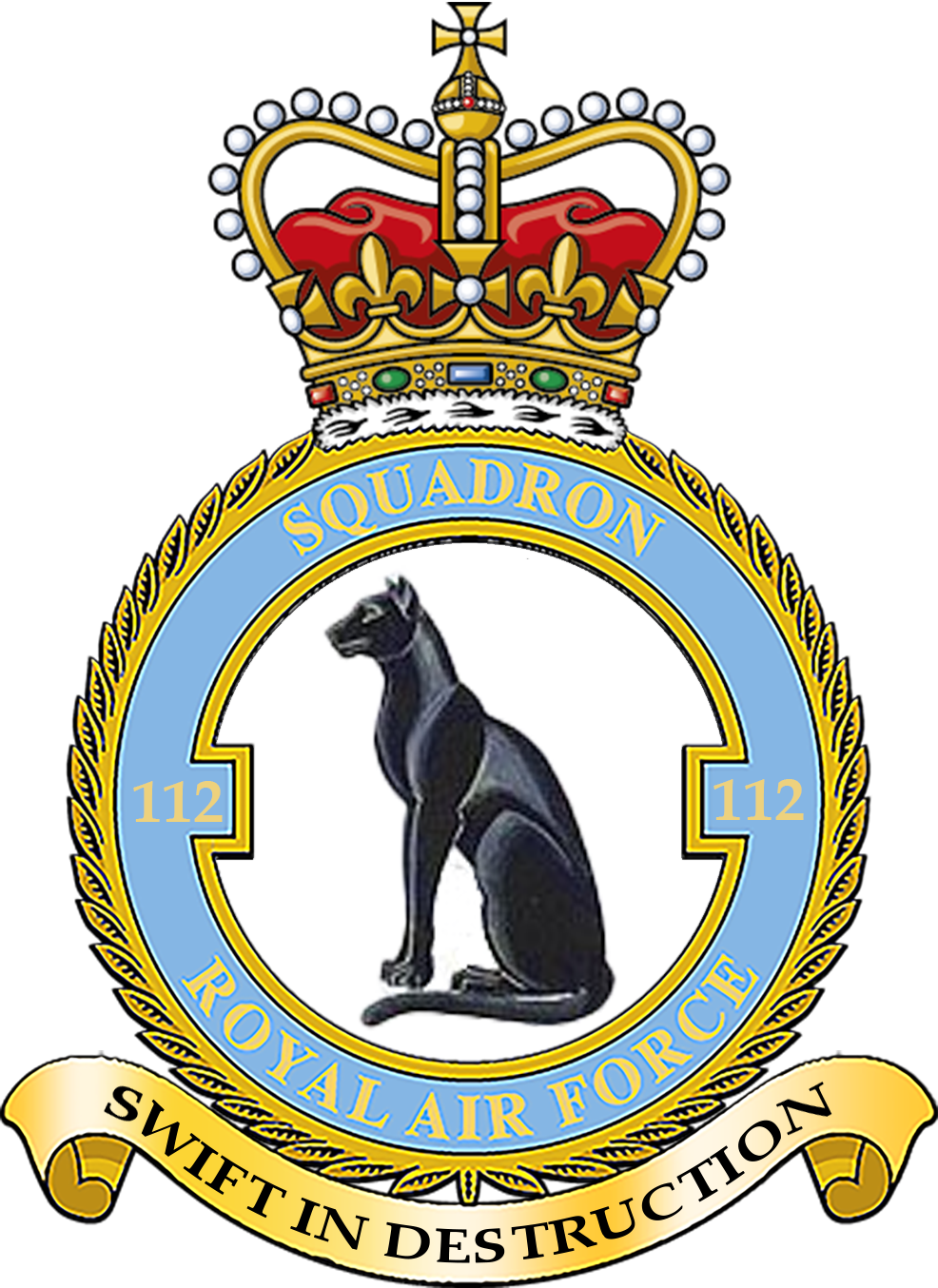
- 112 Squadron Crest Post War
- Active: 30 July 1917 – 13 June 1919; 16 May 1939 – 30 December 1946; 12 May 1951 – 31 May 1957; 1 August 1960 – 31 March 1964; 2 November 1964 – 1 July 1975
- Country: United Kingdom
- Branch: Royal Air Force
- Nickname: "The Shark Squadron"
- Motto: "Swift in Destruction"
- Battle honours: Home Defence 1917–1918, Egypt 1940, Greece 1941, Western Desert 1941–43, Italy 1943

Commanders
- Notable commanders: Clive Caldwell; Billy Drake

Insignia
- Squadron Badge heraldry: "A cat sejant".
- Squadron codes: XO May–Sep 1939; RT 1940 – Jun 1941; GA Jun 1941 – Dec 1946; T May 1951 – Jul 1953; A Jul 1953 – Jan 1954

No. 112 Squadron was a squadron of the Royal Air Force. It served in both the First World War and Second World War and was active for three periods during the Cold War. It is nicknamed "The Shark Squadron", an allusion to the fact that it was the first unit from any Allied air force to use the famous "shark mouth" logo on Curtiss P-40s.

== First World War ==
The squadron was formed as No. 112 Squadron of the Royal Flying Corps on 30 July 1917 at Throwley Aerodrome, Kent, England for air defence duties protecting the London area. It was equipped initially with Sopwith Pups and received Sopwith Camels in 1918. One of its first commanding officers was Major Quintin Brand (who would become a group commander with RAF Fighter Command during the Battle of Britain). In the summer of 1918, the best pilots were selected to form No. 151 Squadron which was sent to France. Still flying Camels they operated at night, attacking German airfields. Following the end of the war, the squadron was disbanded on 13 June 1919.

== Second World War ==
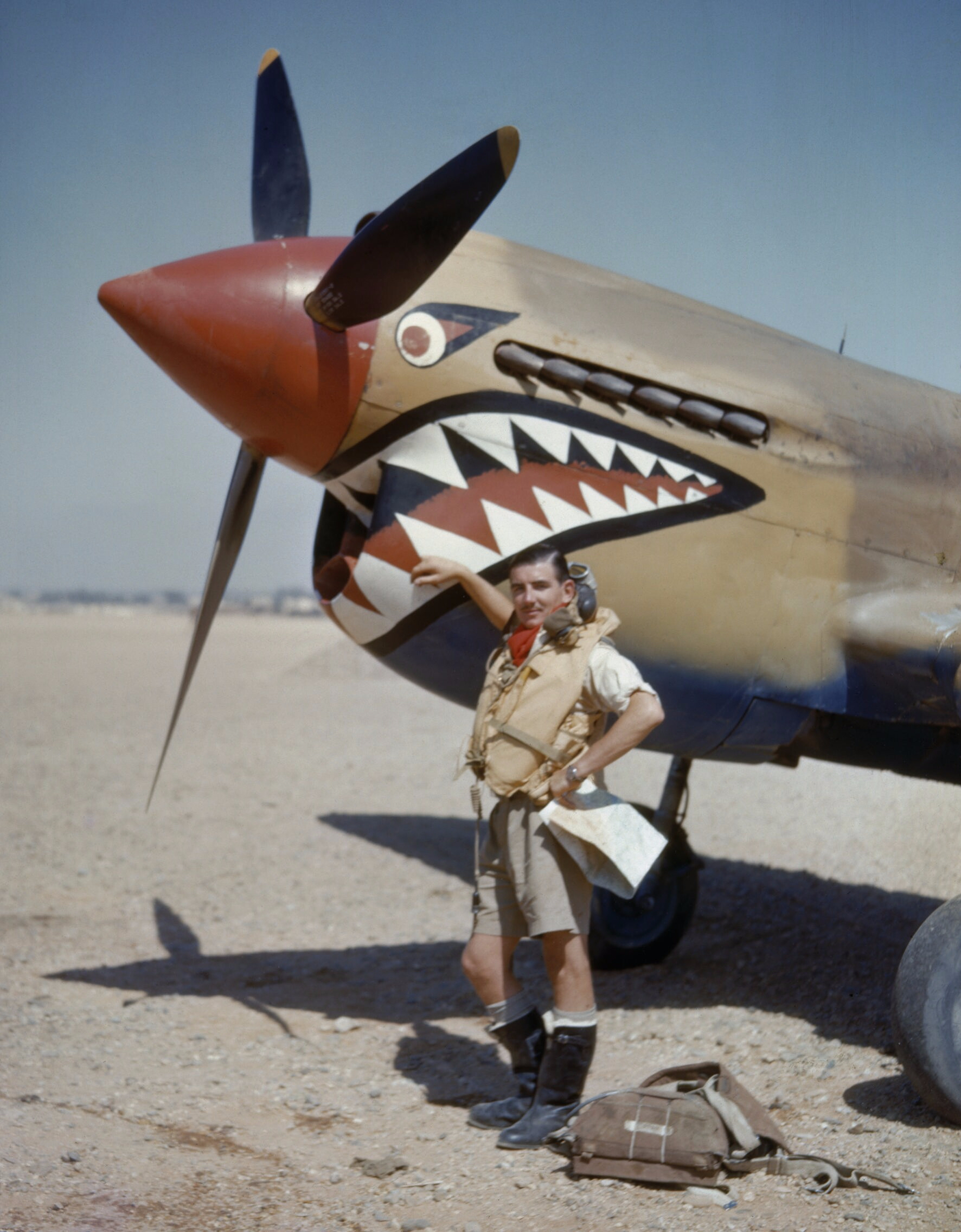
A Flight Lieutenant standing by his Curtiss Kittyhawk Mk I at Sidi Heneish, Egypt, April 1942

The squadron was re-formed 16 May 1939, on board the aircraft carrier HMS Argus for service in Egypt. It was based initially at RAF Helwan at Helwan, Cairo Governorate. On 26 May, "B" Flight was detached and sent to Sudan. The squadron did not receive its aircraft, obsolescent Gloster Gladiator biplane fighters, until June. After Italy entered the war on 10 June 1940, the squadron was soon in action, defending Egypt from Italian bombers. "B" Flight became part of No. 14 Squadron RAF on 30 June.

In January 1941, the squadron joined Allied forces in the Battle of Greece, providing air cover and offensive support over Albania. It later took part in dogfights as part of the air defence of the Athens area. With the defeat of the Allied campaign on the Greek mainland, 112 Sqn withdrew to Crete and then to Egypt, from where it rejoined the North African Campaign, supporting the Eighth Army. For much of the remainder of the war, the squadron was part of No. 239 Wing, with No. 3 Squadron RAAF, No. 250 Squadron RAF, No. 260 Squadron RAF and No. 450 Squadron RAAF.

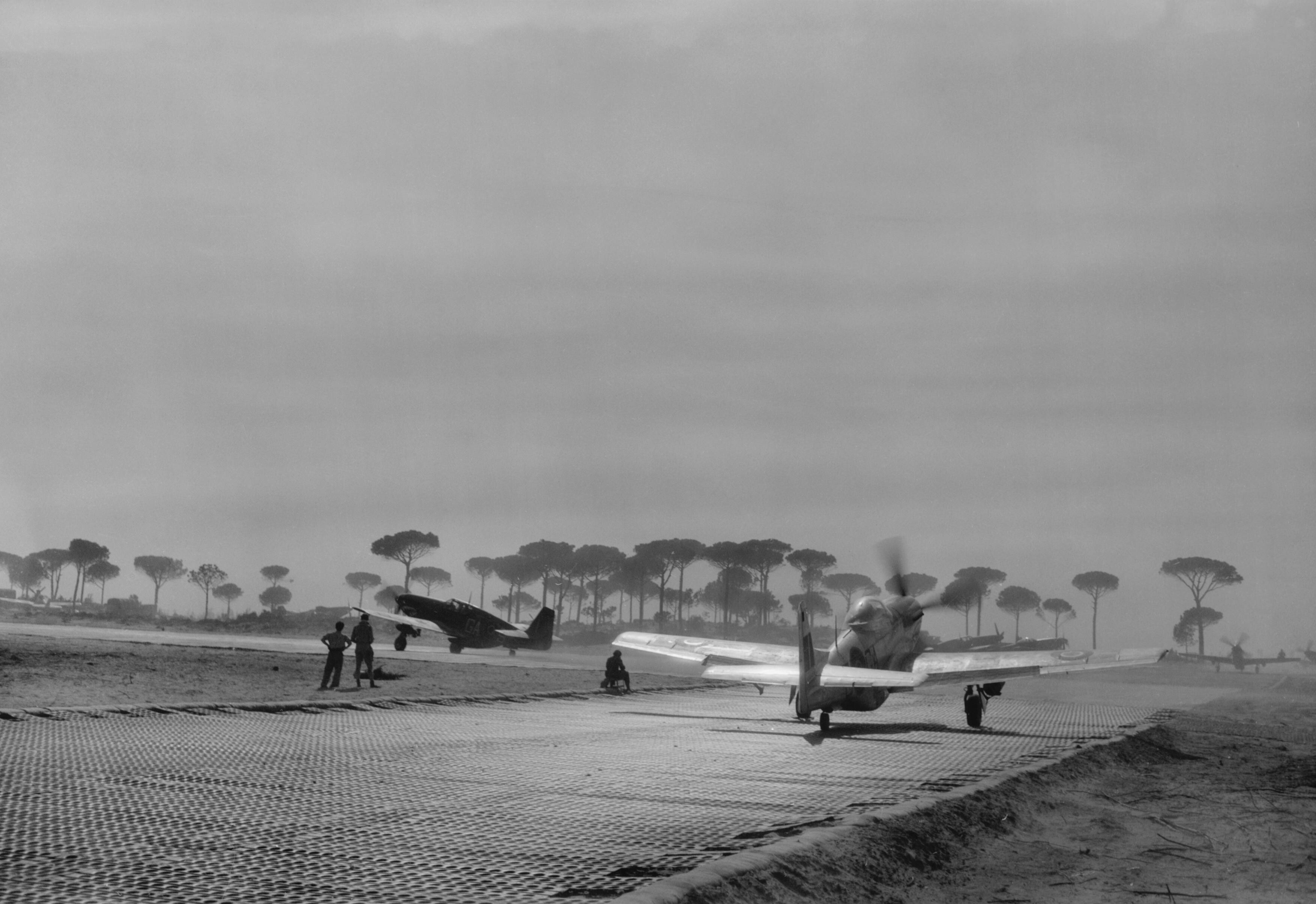
North American Mustangs of 112 Squadron loaded with 500-lb GP bombs, taxi to the runway at Cervia, Italy, before taking off in support of Operation Olive the spring offensive in the Po Valley by the Eighth Army. A Mark III leads a Mark IV

During July 1941, the squadron was one of the first in the world to become operational with the Curtiss Tomahawk, which it used as a fighter and fighter-bomber. Inspired by the unusually large air inlet on the P-40, the squadron copied the "shark's mouth" logo painted on some German Messerschmitt Bf 110s of Zerstörergeschwader 76 earlier in the war. (This practice was later followed by P-40 units in other parts of the world, including the Flying Tigers, American volunteers serving with the Chinese Air Force.) In December, the Tomahawks were replaced by the improved P-40 Kittyhawk, which the squadron used for the remainder of its time with the Desert Air Force, often as a fighter bomber.

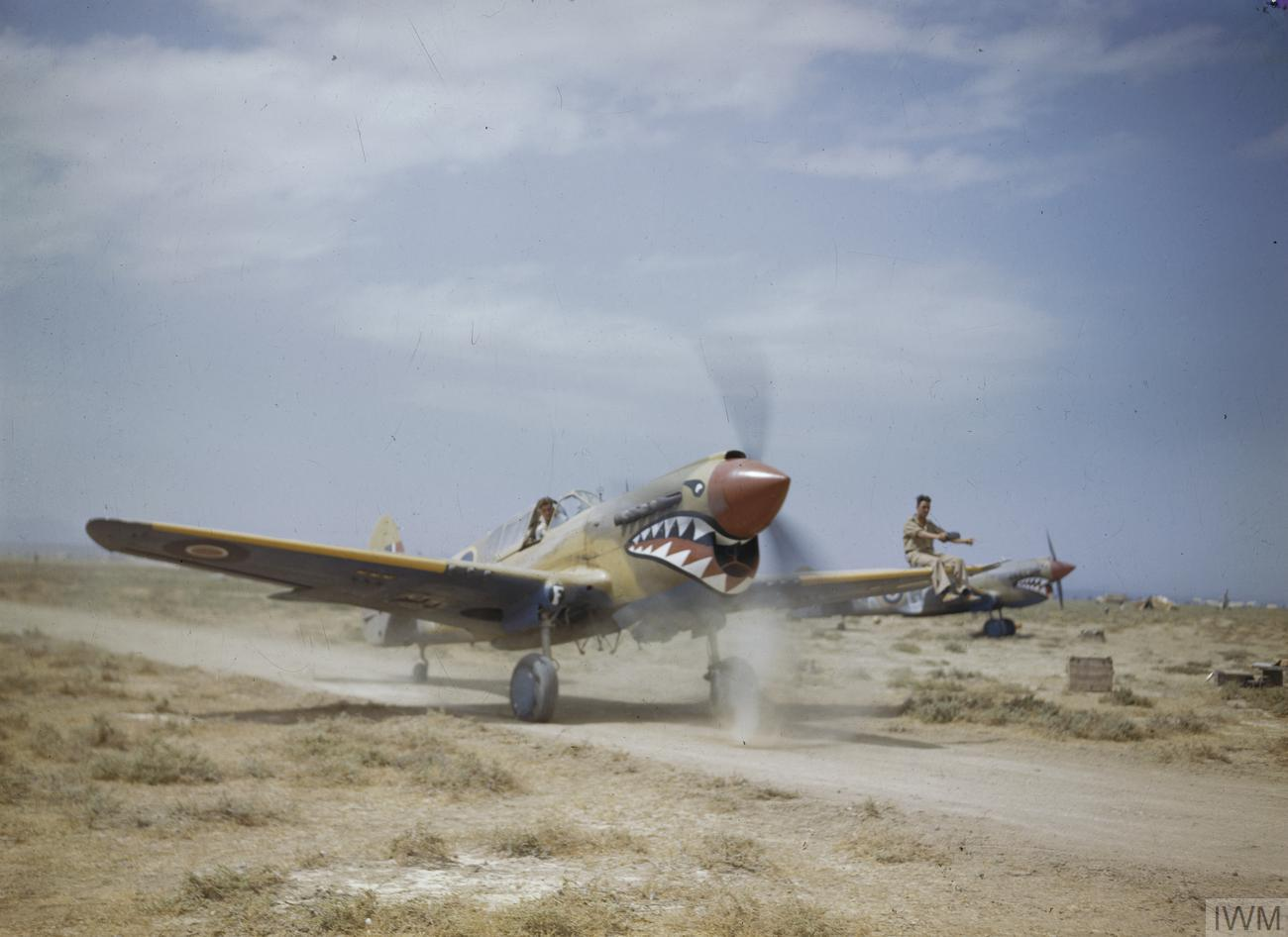
1943. A Curtiss P-40/Kittyhawk Mark III of No. 112 Squadron, Royal Air Force taxiing through the scrub at Medenine, Tunisia. The ground crewman on the wing is directing the pilot, whose view ahead is hindered by the aircraft's nose. The squadron was the first Allied unit to use the "shark mouth" marking on the P-40, in mid-1941.

The squadron had many personnel from the air forces of Poland, Australia, Canada and New Zealand. Another member was the British ace Neville Duke (later prominent as a test pilot). For most of 1942, it was commanded by the highest-scoring Australian ace of World War II, Clive Caldwell, the first Empire Air Training Scheme graduate to command a British unit. He was succeeded by Billy Drake, the highest-scoring RAF P-40 pilot and the second highest-scoring British Commonwealth P-40 pilot, behind Caldwell. Later in the war, an increasing number of South African pilots joined the unit.

After the invasion of Sicily on 10 July 1943, the squadron moved to the island and onto the Italian mainland in September. In June 1944, the Kittyhawks were replaced by the North American Mustang Mark III and from February 1945, Mustang Mk IVs. The squadron remained in Italy at Lavariano as part of the occupying forces, until disbanding on 30 December 1946 at Treviso. By the end of the war some 206 air victories had been claimed by the squadron and 62 destroyed on the ground.

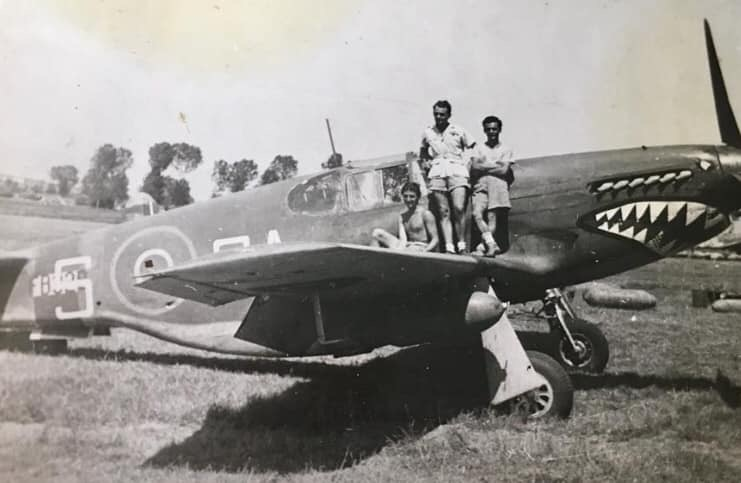

== Cold War ==
The squadron re-formed at RAF Fassberg in Germany on 12 May 1951, on fighter bombers, equipped with de Havilland Vampire Mk 5s. It later moved to Jever and then RAF Bruggen. In January 1954 it became a day fighter squadron, when its Vampires were replaced by Canadair Sabre F Mk IVs. Hawker Hunters were delivered to 112 Sqn in April 1956 but the unit was disbanded at Bruggen on 31 May 1957. On 1 August 1960, the squadron was re-formed as a Bloodhound surface-to-air missile unit, at RAF Church Fenton, defending Thor IRBM sites in the area. The squadron's operational base was at RAF Breighton. Following withdrawal of the Thor from service, the need for the unit was reduced, and it disbanded on 31 March 1964. The squadron was re-formed on 2 November 1964, at RAF Woodhall Spa, equipped with Bloodhound Mk 2s. The squadron moved to Cyprus on 1 October 1967 and remained there until it was disbanded on 1 July 1975.

== Aircraft operated ==
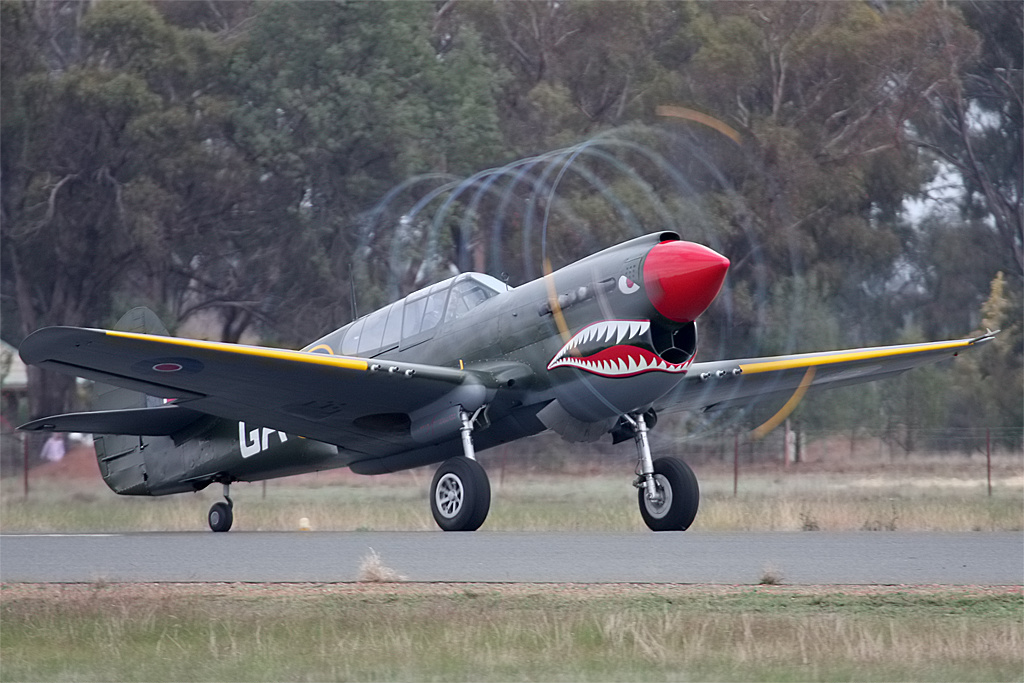
A restored P-40N painted in 112 Squadron RAF green livery (from 1943) taking off at Temora, New South Wales

- 1917–1918 – Sopwith Pup
- 1918–1919 – Sopwith Camel
- 1919 – Sopwith Snipe
- 1939–1941 – Gloster Gladiator I & II
- 1940–1940 – Gloster Gauntlet
- 1941 – Hawker Hurricane I
- 1941 – Curtiss Tomahawk I
- 1941 – Curtiss Tomahawk IIA & IIB
- 1941–1942 Curtiss Kittyhawk 1A
- 1942–1944 Curtiss Kittyhawk III
- 1944 Curtiss Kittyhawk IV
- 1944–1945 North American Mustang III
- 1945–1946 North American Mustang IV
- 1951–1954 de Havilland Vampire FB5
- 1954–1956 Canadair Sabre F4
- 1956–1957 Hawker Hunter F4
- 1960–1964 Bristol Bloodhound I
- 1964–1975 Bristol Bloodhound II

== See also ==
- List of Royal Air Force aircraft squadrons
