= RAF Luqa =

Former British RAF station in Malta

RAF Luqa
- Malta

Site information
- Type: Royal Air Force station
- Owner: Ministry of Defence
- Operator: Royal Air Force

Location
- Shown within Malta
- Coordinates: 35°51′27″N 014°28′39″E

Site history
- Built: 1940
- In use: 1941–1979

Airfield information
- Elevation: 78 metres (256 ft) AMSL
Runways
Direction	Length and surface
05/23	Asphalt
13/31	Asphalt

Royal Air Force Luqa (or more simply RAF Luqa) is a former Royal Air Force station located on the island of Malta, now developed into the Malta International Airport.

It hosted aircraft of Air Headquarters Malta (AHQ Malta) during the Second World War. Particularly during the Siege of Malta from 1941 to 1943, RAF Luqa was a very important base for British Commonwealth forces fighting against Italy and Germany for naval control of the Mediterranean and for ground control of North Africa. Air combat over and near Malta was some of the most ferocious of the war, and a series of airfields were built on the small, rocky island: at Luqa, Ta' Qali, and Hal Far, plus satellite fields at Safi, Qrendi and on Malta's second island of Gozo.

== History ==
=== Second World War ===
No. 1435 (Night Fighter) Flight was first formed at Malta as a night fighter unit on 4 December 1941, by re-naming the Malta Night Fighter Unit. In July 1942, personnel from 603 Squadron were equipped with the Spitfire V to form the unit. After a brief period as 1435 (Fighter) Flight, at Luqa, due to its size it was raised to 1435 Squadron RAF on 2 August 1942 still at Luqa.

RAFWeb writes that the original Malta "photographic reconnaissance unit was 69 Squadron." "B" Flight, 69 Squadron RAF was formed into 683 Squadron on 8 February 1943. The squadron flew Spitfire Mark IVs, Mark XIs and later Mark XIXs. Just over eight months later, in November 1943, 683 Squadron moved to Tunisia.

=== Post war ===
After the war, Luqa remained an important RAF base, serving during the Suez Crisis of 1956, but also as Malta's main civilian airport. 37 Squadron, which had arrived from Palestine in 1948, left Luqa for RAF Khormaksar in Aden in July 1957. While four Avro Shackleton aircraft and the squadron's identity were transferred to Aden, two aircraft were left to join 38 Squadron, still at Luqa. No. 13 Squadron RAF began a long association, equipped with English Electric Canberra, moving to Malta in 1965 and remained in Malta until transferring to RAF Wyton in 1978.

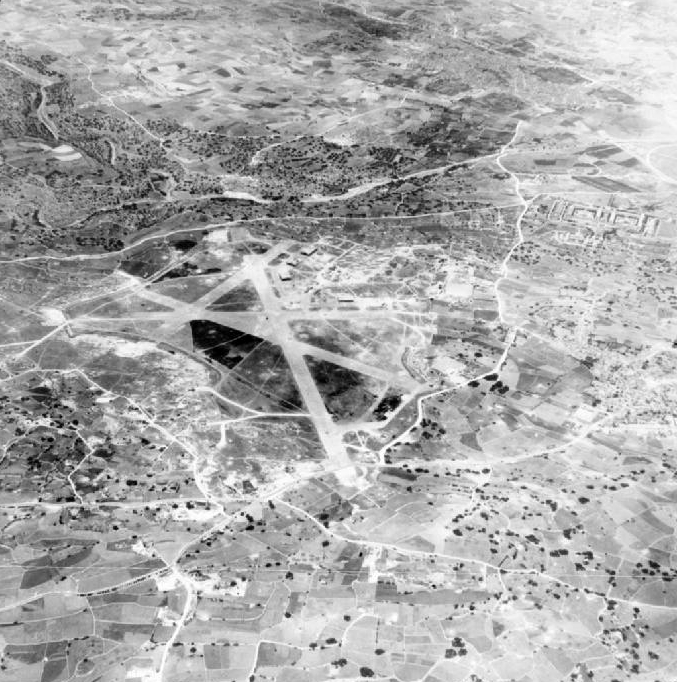
RAF Luqa in 1941.

203 Squadron disbanded on 31 December 1977 at Luqa, by which time it was part of 18 Group in RAF Strike Command. It had been flying BAe Nimrod maritime patrol aircraft.

The RAF left in 1979 following a British government decision not to renew the lease on the station from the Maltese. The payments demanded for a lease extension were several times higher than the payments under the previous lease. A 120 Squadron Nimrod made the last flight out of Luqa on the morning of 1 April 1979.

== Current use ==
Nowadays, the location has been developed as the main entry point for air traffic into the modern, independent country of Malta, under the name Malta International Airport. It is sometimes still referred to as "Luqa Airport" or "Valletta Airport".

== See also ==
- List of former Royal Air Force stations
- List of air stations of the Royal Navy
