= No. 128 Squadron RAF =

Defunct flying squadron of the Royal Air Force

- Active: 1 February 1918 – 4 July 1918; 7 October 1941 – 8 March 1943; 5 September 1944 – 31 March 1946
- Country: United Kingdom
- Branch: Royal Air Force
- Mottos: Latin: Fulminis Instar ("Like a Thunderbolt")

Insignia
- Squadron heraldry: In front of an ogress a shuttle in hand
- Squadron Codes: WG (October 1941 – March 1943); M5 (September 1944 – March 1946)

No. 128 Squadron RAF was a Royal Air Force Squadron briefly existed in the later stages of the First World War without seeing operational service. It was reformed as a fighter squadron in the Second World War in West Africa, tasked with the aerial defence of RAF bases and stations in Sierra Leone from 1941 to 1943 before being disbanded. It was later reestablished as a pathfinder squadron in Bomber Command.

== History ==
No. 128 Squadron was formed as part of the Royal Flying Corps in February 1918 and subsequently became a unit of the Royal Air Force. It was disbanded after six months of existence, without having become operational.

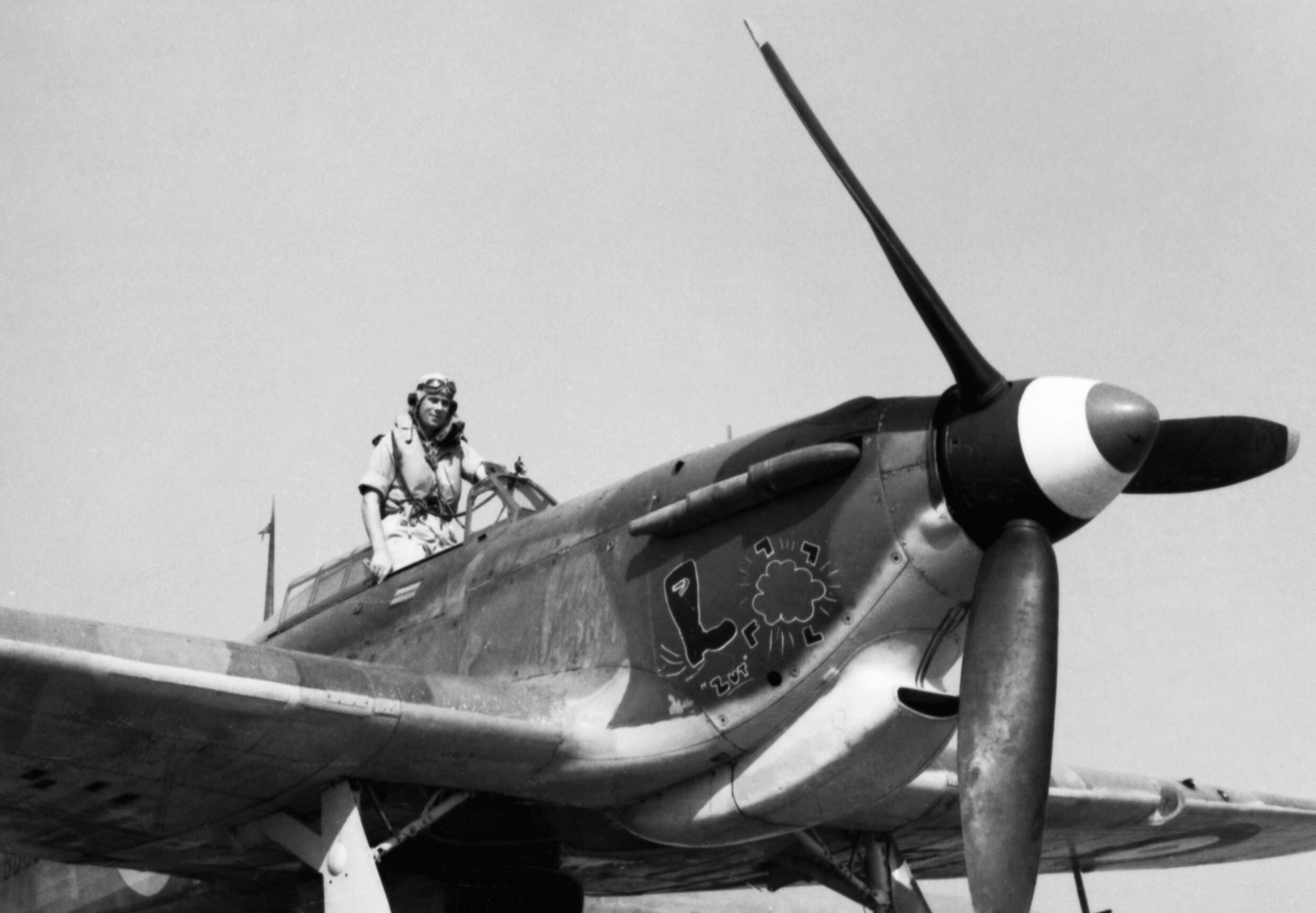
The commander of No. 128 Squadron upon its formation was Squadron Leader Billy Drake, see here shortly before he relinquished command in March 1942

During the Second World War, the squadron was reformed at Hastings, Sierra Leone, in October 1941 from a flight of Hawker Hurricane fighters belonging to No. 95 Flying-Boat Squadron. Bearing the squadron code 'WG' and commanded by Squadron Leader Billy Drake, it was tasked with the defence of the RAF stations and bases in the area. It saw few engagements and was disbanded in March 1943.

It was reformed in September 1944 at Wyton with de Havilland Mosquito light bombers as part of the Light Night Striking Force. It served in this capacity until April 1946, at which time it was re-designated as No. 14 Squadron.

== Aircraft operated ==
Aircraft operated by No. 128 Squadron
From	To	Aircraft	Variant
Oct 1941	Mar 1943	Hawker Hurricane	Mk I
Oct 1941	Mar 1943	Hawker Hurricane	Mk IIB
Sep 1944	Apr 1946	de Havilland Mosquito	
