= Billy Drake =

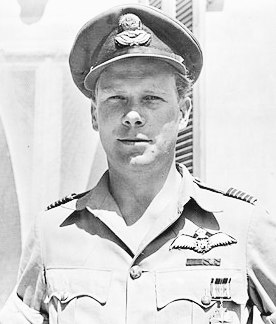
- Wing Commander Billy Drake in 1943.
- Born: 20 December 1917; London, England
- Died: 28 August 2011 (aged 93); Teignmouth, Devon, England
- Military career
- Allegiance: United Kingdom
- Branch: Royal Air Force
- Service years: 1936–1963
- Rank: Group Captain
- Commands: RAF Chivenor (1962–63); No. 20 Wing RAF (1943–44); Krendi Wing (1943); No. 112 Squadron RAF (1942–43); No. 128 Squadron RAF (1941–42); No. 421 (Reconnaissance) Flight RAF (1940–41)
- Conflicts: Second World War: Battle of the Netherlands; Battle of France; Battle of Britain; Channel Front; West African Campaign; North African Campaign; Mediterranean Theatre
- Awards: Distinguished Service Order; Distinguished Flying Cross & Bar; Distinguished Flying Cross (United States)

Group Captain Billy Drake, DSO, DFC & Bar (20 December 1917 – 28 August 2011) was a British fighter pilot and air ace. He was credited officially with 18 enemy aircraft destroyed, two shared, two unconfirmed, four probables, two shared probables and five damaged and one shared damaged with the Royal Air Force during the Second World War. Further revisions to these statistics increased this total to 20 destroyed and seven damaged with a further 13 destroyed and four damaged on the ground. (Note: According to the USAF historian, Major Robert Tate, Drake's career claims can be corroborated 70% to 80%, indicating that some of his claims may not have actually been aerial victories. Tate found similar corroboration rates for other pilots during the same period: Clive Caldwell (50% to 60% corroboration), Hans-Joachim Marseille (65% to 70% corroboration), John Lloyd Waddy (70% to 80% corroboration) and Nicky Barr (60% to 70% corroboration))

Drake flew Hawker Hurricanes, Supermarine Spitfires and Curtiss P-40s (Tomahawks/Kittyhawks), with squadrons based in France, England, West Africa, North Africa and Malta. He was the top-scoring RAF P-40 pilot and the second-highest-scoring British Commonwealth P-40 pilot, behind Clive Caldwell.

== Early life and education ==
Drake was born in London, to Gerda Browne and Dr Dennis John Drake on 20 December 1917. Gerda was one of fifteen children of Irish Catholic heritage born in Australia. It is claimed that his father was a descendant of Francis Drake, the 16th Century explorer and naval commander who led an English fleet against the Spanish Armada in 1588. Gerda's family were successful gold miners in Queensland; they purchased a schooner and became merchants.

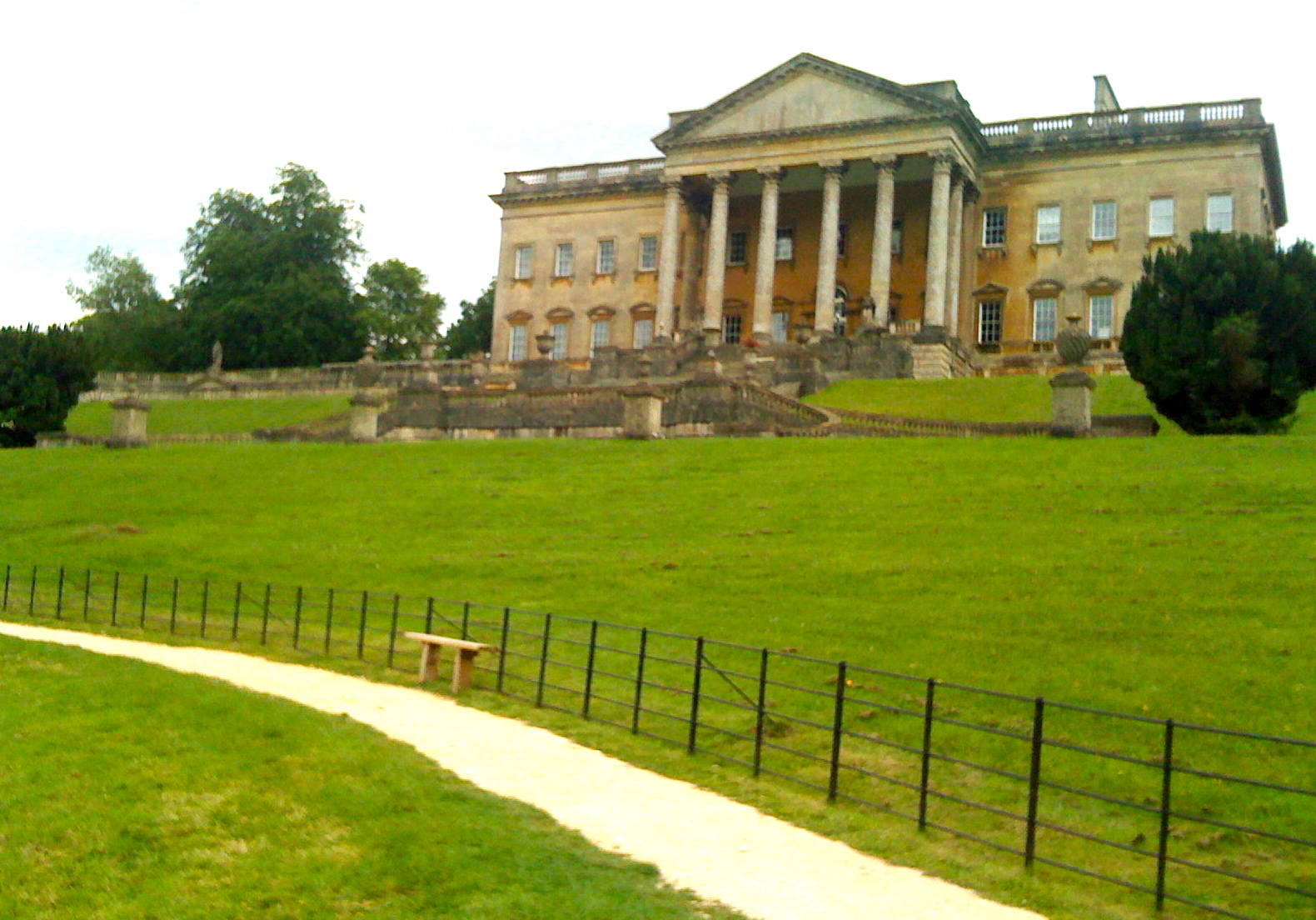
Prior Park, one of the schools Drake attended

Billy was christened as such soon after birth; he was not given the name William. Drake's father traded and travelled around the southern Pacific and his infant son accompanied him to Australia, New Zealand, Fiji and ultimately Tangiers in Morocco where Drake senior set up a clinic. Drake began school at the Lycée Regnault until the family moved to England.

Drake was sent to Prior Park, a Catholic-run preparatory school, which was appropriated by the Congregation of Christian Brothers in 1921. Drake's formative years were unremarkable and he developed an interest in history and architecture. Drake's father taught him to use a shotgun at the age of twelve, beginning his interest in marksmanship and shooting. The family then moved to Switzerland and Drake completed his elementary education at the Kollegium Maria Hilf boarding school, run by German–Swiss Catholics. Drake rapidly learned the German language during this period. Drake was one of the few English pupils at the school which was dominated by Italians and Germans. Two years later Drake moved to the French–Swiss Institut Florimont school in Geneva, where he learnt French.

When Drake returned to England the threat of future war was present, a consequence of Adolf Hitler and Benito Mussolini's aggressive foreign policies, and he began to contemplate a military career. Drake had visited Alan Cobham's Flying Circus as a small boy in the twenties and spent half a crown on a twenty-minute flight. After this experience, Drake spent his time reading aviation books and reading about First World War aviators. He decided to pursue a career as a military aviator, encouraged by a subscription to The Aeroplane. His parents were adamantly opposed to his career path.

=== RAF career ===
In the summer, 1936, Drake stumbled across an advertisement in Aeroplane for applicants to join the Royal Air Force (RAF) on a Short Service Commission (SSC). The four-year term offered came with a £300 gratuity. Drake overcame his parents' opposition through his own misreading of the advertisement, which he read to be an annuity not a gratuity. The size of the non–existent annuity persuaded his family to relent. When the error was discovered they allowed him to attend the interview at the Air Ministry, certain he would be turned down. Drake passed the interview but failed the eyesight examination. He returned after three months and passed the second test.

Drake joined the RAF on a SSC in July 1936, having only just reached the minimal service age requirement of 17. He was sent to Hamble in Hampshire to attend the Air Service Training (AST) unit and made his first flight, with instruction, on 14 July 1936. Six weeks of intensive training followed, which included learning aerobatic manoeuvres and to restart the engine when airborne. Navigation training in cross–country flights occurred in mid-August over Yatesbury and Filton. On 3 September 1936, Drake passed out as an average–rated pilot. He had accumulated 60 hours flying, half solo, plus five and a half hours on instrument–based piloting. Drake was granted £50 to purchase his uniform and other items from the Army and Navy Store on Victoria Street in the City of Westminster.

Drake was sent to RAF Uxbridge as a Pilot Officer on probation, and there he learned parade and drill. After completion of this training Drake was sent to 6 Flying Training School at Netheravon in the Salisbury Plain area of Wiltshire. He took his first flight with instruction in a Hawker Hart on 22 September and then flew solo on 7 October. On 1 January 1937, Drake failed the Chief Instructor's Flying Test after attempting a deliberate near–stall manoeuvre to prove he could fly the aircraft slower than his instructor and remain airborne. The examiner took control before the Hart entered an irrevocable stall and failed him immediately on landing. On 9 January his instructor passed him and he was sent on leave with 138 hours in his logbook.

On his return, Drake met Francis Ronald Swain who held the world altitude record and who later became his commanding officer. Drake flew the Hawker Audax and Hawker Fury from 2 February 1937. On 14 May he survived a crash when the Fury he was flying went into a spin after ground crews had overloaded it. On 19 May Drake completed gunnery training at Armament Practice Camp and was ready for a squadron posting.

He joined No. 1 Squadron that same day at RAF Tangmere. His Squadron Leader was Swain. The unit was equipped with the Fury. At 1 Squadron Drake became one of the unit's acrobatic pilots and gained experience in perfecting deflection shooting. On 29 August 1938 Drake flew a Gloster Gladiator for the first time. On 19 October he flew his first monoplane, a Hawker Hurricane. Drake ferried various aircraft to flying schools and when picking up a Hurricane from Brooklands, he received a personal brief by test pilot Dickie Reynell, who was killed in action in 1940. On 11 January 1939 Drake was permitted to fire the guns for the first time, in contravention of pre-war stringency. He also undertook some night flying. In March he received an average rating as a fighter pilot.

== World War II ==
On 3 September 1939 Britain and France declared war on Nazi Germany after the invasion of Poland. 1 Squadron moved to Vassincourt on 9 October 1939 during the Phoney War. The squadron had orders to protect airfields of the RAF Advanced Air Striking Force.

On 19 April 1940 Drake scored his first victory. The squadron was scrambled to engage high-flying aircraft that they could not reach. During the flight Drake spotted nine Messerschmitt Bf 109s. During the subsequent dogfight he claimed one destroyed and one probable over Metz. The second Bf 109 was pursued into Germany at low–level and Drake reported he crashed into a hill near Gau-Bickelheim. The squadron claimed three; German sources state two were lost. The German fighters belonged to 7. Staffel Jagdgeschwader 53. A Leutnant Sievers was killed and the anonymous second pilot apparently ran out of fuel escaping from Drake, which the German record asserts as the cause of the crash. Fighter Command records list only one claim for Drake made over Thionville.

=== Battle of France and Netherlands ===
On 10 May 1940 the Wehrmacht (Nazi German armed forces) began Operation Yellow (Fall Gelb). The German forces occupied Luxembourg, invaded the Netherlands, and Belgium, part of the wider Battle of France. 1 Squadron operated from a small village, Berry-au-Bac, near Rennes. On the morning of the attack Drake was driving to the airfield when German aircraft appeared over the region.

Four pilots of A Flight intercepted a reconnaissance aircraft of 7./Kampfgeschwader 3 and destroyed it but one Hurricane force-landed due to return-fire. Drake scrambled with B Flight and, with Flying Officer Boy Mould, claimed a Heinkel He 111 each. The victories were confirmed. A bomber flown by Oberleutnant Willy Partl crashed with all the airmen killed while another crashed with the crew taken as prisoner of war. The German aircraft were from 5./Kampfgeschwader 53. A third bomber was damaged with a crew member wounded. A Hurricane pilot survived a bale out after being hit by return fire. Drake's records indicate he was credited with only a shared victory. Fighter Command records list the victory clearly as a solo claim, filed at circa 05:00 near Verdun. Other sources state this combat occurred in the afternoon.

The airfield came under attack as A and B Flight returned. A hangar was destroyed and three French labourers and their horses were killed. On 11 May, 1 Squadron fought inclusive engagements with Kampfgeschwader 2 and other German formations. On 12 May, 1 Squadron flew as fighter escort for Fairey Battle squadrons in the Battle of Maastricht. The French and British made a vain attempt to destroy the bridges. Drake wrote; "all we saw were 10/10ths [reference to cloud coverage severity] and Bf 109s". Drake stated there was little he could do, "so we pissed off".

The following day Drake was on a combat air patrol but was forced to leave his formation because of oxygen failure. On the return flight he spotted three Dornier Do 17s he thought were unescorted and claimed one shot down. Lining up a second Drake was shot down by a Messerschmitt Bf 110 and was forced to bale out. Drake was credited with one bomber destroyed. The claim against the second Dornier was unconfirmed. The Bf 110 belonged to either I./Zerstörergeschwader 52 or V (Zerstörer)/Lehrgeschwader 1. Drake was wounded by splinters in the leg and back. He was operated on to repair the damage and evacuated to Paris, then Le Mans and finally was flown back to England in a Fairey Battle.

=== Battle of Britain and Channel Front ===
Drake returned to duty on 20 June 1940 as a flying instructor to No. 6 Operational Training Unit (OTU), at RAF Sutton Bridge during the Battle of Britain. Sutton Bridge is on the Lincolnshire coast, in Eastern England. During this time Drake met, and in some cases trained, future aces. Among the foreign contingent were Antoni Głowacki, František Fajtl, Stanisław Skalski, and Witold Urbanowicz. Of these pilots, Drake remarked that there was little they could learn from him.

Drake made repeated requests to be returned to operational duty. Eventually, he was sent to No. 213 Squadron RAF on 2 October 1940 at RAF Tangmere on the English Channel coast with the rank of Flight Lieutenant and commander of A Flight. The transfer earned Drake the distinction of being one of the so-called "Few" of Fighter Command in the Battle of Britain, which ended on 31 October 1940. Drake claimed a probable Bf 109 on 10 October, the only claim with the squadron. According to the logbook Drake flew his first mission on 3 October and his last on the 23rd. He engaged hostile aircraft on six occasions and flew only Hurricanes. On one occasion his flight was attacked by Supermarine Spitfires.

Drake volunteered for No. 421 (Reconnaissance) Flight RAF with Spitfires, flying specialised low-level reconnaissance patrols over the English Channel and the French Channel coast. On 13 November on patrol with Jim Crow and Pilot Officer James Eric "Jas" Storrar they were surprised by Bf 109s. One of the Spitfires was severely damaged and force-landed in a field.

On 20 November 1940, Drake claimed a Do 17 damaged at 09:00 near Calais, France. On 6 December Drake claimed a shared probable Do 17 over the French coast again and on 27 December his logbook shows a second probable claim. The book was annotated for army observers confirmed the crash. Sergeant Arthur Charles Leigh of No. 611 Squadron RAF also claimed Do 17 damaged near Sheerness at 11.05.

Prior to the action of 27 December, Drake was awarded the Distinguished Flying Cross (DFC). The citation, dated 20 December 1940, read, "In October this officer carried out reconnaissance which proved of great value. He has at all times displayed fine qualities of leadership and perseverance. He has destroyed at least four enemy aircraft."

On 7 January 1941 Drake claimed a Junkers Ju 88 damaged plus another shared damaged with one other pilot. On 2 February Drake flew on a calibration test over the Channel. At 36,000 ft over Le Crotoy the Spitfire developed engine trouble and he landed at RAF Hawkinge. It was discovered a con rod had broken and burst through the engine block. Drake moved to No. 53 Operational Training Unit with the rank of Squadron Leader under the command of Ira Jones, at RAF Heston and as Chief Flying Instructor at RAF Llandow until 3 September 1941.

=== West Africa, North Africa and Italy ===
Drake was posted to West Africa to form and command No. 128 Squadron RAF at Hastings, Sierra Leone. While there he claimed a rare victory for the squadron over a Vichy French Air Force bomber. Drake intercepted the unarmed aircraft, which was probably on a reconnaissance flight. He flew alongside and motioned to the pilot to land. The French airman refused and Drake shot it down. The Glenn Martin 167F crashed near Freetown. The Vichy pilots rarely made an appearance over British territory.

In the port, Drake saw the battleship HMS Prince of Wales and battlecruiser HMS Repulse sailing to their destruction in the Pacific War. In January 1942, Keith Park, former air officer commanding No. 11 Group RAF, passed through on his way to Egypt to take up the post of commanding officer there. Park and Drake had met before and upon learning Drake was commanding 128 Squadron, he requested that the Squadron Leader be sent out to Egypt as a member of his staff. Subsequently, in March 1942, Drake was ordered to Air HQ Middle East, based in Cairo.

Soon after his arrival, Drake was posted as a supernumerary Squadron Leader to No. 260 Squadron RAF. The post served as training to allow Drake time to familiarise himself with the air tactics and the art of fighting and commanding in a desert environment. On 25 May he succeeded Clive Caldwell as commander of No. 112 Squadron "Shark's Squadron", flying the P-40 Kittyhawk, from RAF Gambut, Egypt. 112 Squadron had been rested since 15 May.

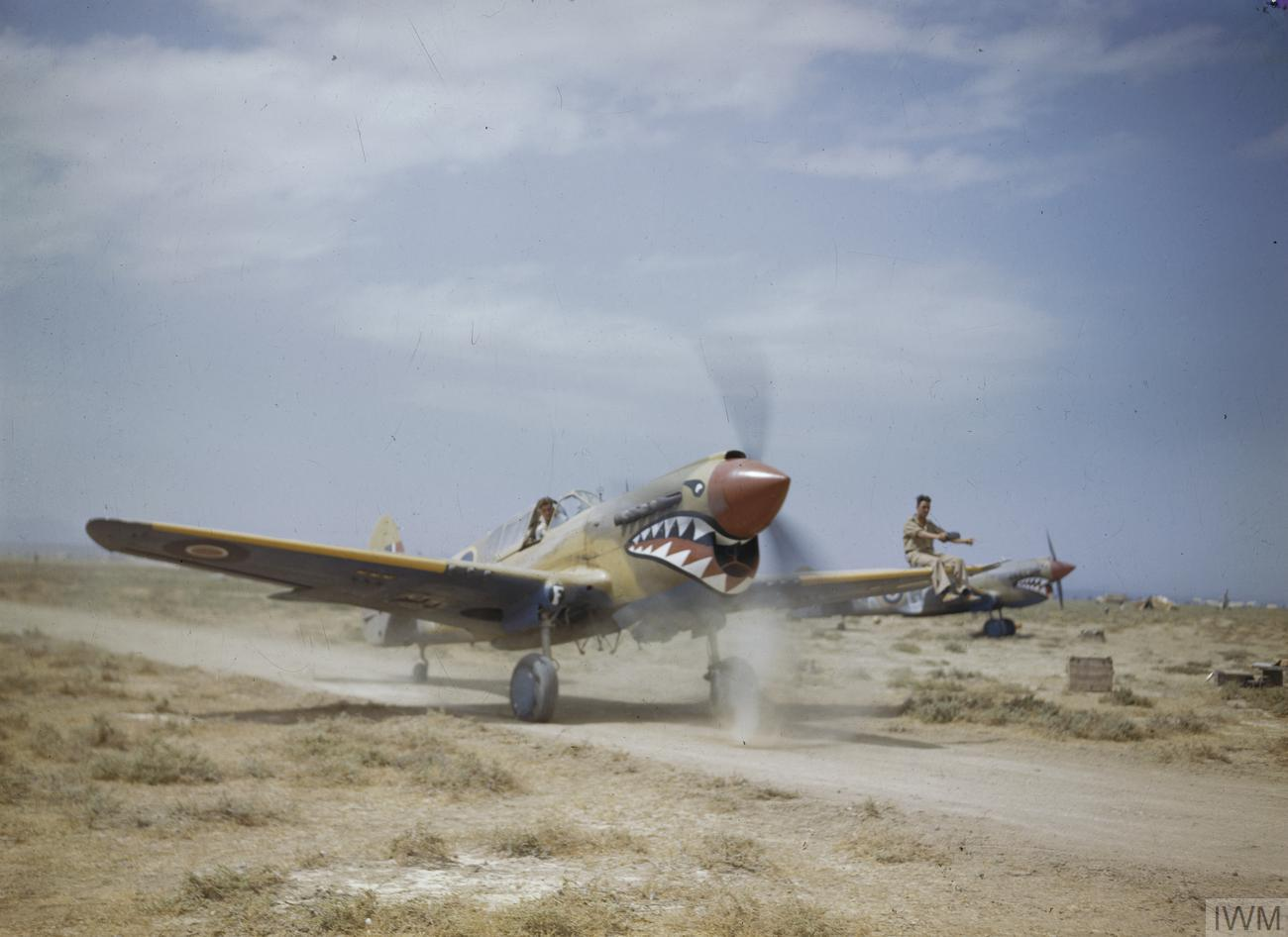
112 Squadron at Medenine, Tunisia. Note the shark mouth motif on the nose.

Drake regarded the orientation to close air support as a time-consuming adjustment. He learned to attack in a 35 to 40-degree dive and practiced strafing. The 250 lb bombs were fitted with extension rods which detonated the bomb above the ground to cause maximum damage to vehicles and personnel. Drake remarked of the air war:

With bombs slung underneath our aircraft and our attention focused largely on the ground, we could have been perceived as highly vulnerable. However, I do not recall any feelings of inferiority to the Bf 109s. Many flight commanders had flown in the Battle of Britain, and were used to seeing Messerschmitts being about. We were also by now aware that there not a great many of them available in North Africa.

The Squadron leader's first success came on 6 June 1942. Above Bir Hacheim—during the Battle of Bir Hakeim—Drake's logbook states he claimed a Bf 109F but this is listed as only probably destroyed in other sources. No Bf 109Fs were lost that day according to German losses; however, three Bf 109Es from 4.(H)/12 were shot down—one to anti-aircraft fire. Three Bf 109s and one probable were credited to 112 Squadron.

The squadron targeted airfields after the battle. On 12 June 1942 claimed one Bf 109 destroyed and another damaged. On 17 June Drake carried out an attack on Gazala No. 2 airfield and claimed another three Bf 109s on the ground. In aerial combat he claimed a Bf 109E probable on 2 July and 8 July he claimed another destroyed. The British fighter squadrons claimed five Bf 109s, two probable and three damaged. Three Bf 109s from JG 27 were shot down and another from III./JG 53 crash-landed. On 23 July he claimed a Macchi C.202 and the following morning a Messerschmitt Bf 110. Drake made the only claim for a Bf 110. A Bf 110F-2 from 4. (H)/12, Werknummer 5007 BG+G1 was reported lost. Feldwebel Karl Birkner and Leutnant Josef Hofbauer were captured and Oberleurnant Karl Brainer was killed in action. Another Bf 110 and Bf 109 were claimed as destroyed on the ground.

On 1 September 1942, a day in which the Desert Air Force suffered heavy losses, Drake claimed two Junkers Ju 87s. On 13 September Drake claimed a Bf 109 destroyed. Leading 112 and other P-40s from the 239 Wing, Drake engaged Bf 109s from I. and III./JG 27 and III./JG 53. 112 Squadron claimed one, a probable and two damaged. Only two Bf 109s from JG 27 were lost. Drake probably shot down Unteroffizier Karl Könning, piloting Werknummer 7334 from 3./JG 27. One 112 Squadron P-40 crashlanded. Drake followed this up with a shared victory against a Ju 87 and a probable against another on 1 October. The aircraft were from Sturzkampfgeschwader 3 which reported losses. On 22 October, on the eve of the Second Battle of El Alamein, Drake claimed a probable Bf 109. Another was credited on 26 October.

On 19 November Drake claimed a Bf 110. This was probably a Bf 110F-2, Werknummer 5071 of 7./Zerstörergeschwader 26. Oberleutnant Hans Kollowrat and Unteroffizier Herbert Gries became prisoner of war.

Drake was awarded a Bar to the DFC on 28 July 1942 and the Distinguished Service Order on 4 December 1942. He scored 13 aerial victories in P-40s.

After being promoted to wing commander in January 1943, Drake briefly assumed a staff job in Cairo, before becoming commander of the Krendi Wing at RAF Krendi on Malta, flying Spitfires. In July 1943, he made his last claim of the war, a Macchi MC.202 of 4 Stormo, Regia Aeronautica, over Sicily.

=== Staff officer ===
In November 1943, Drake returned to England and commanded No. 20 Wing RAF, operating Hawker Typhoons with the Second Tactical Air Force. He was later sent on liaison duties to Fort Leavenworth in the United States. On 22 October 1943, he was awarded the American Distinguished Flying Cross. Drake later served as deputy station commander at RAF Biggin Hill, and finished the war as a staff officer at Supreme Headquarters Allied Expeditionary Force.

He later served as a staff officer and air attaché at British embassies, retiring from the RAF as a group captain on 1 July 1963.

== Later life ==
Upon retirement, Drake spent 20 years in the Algarve coastal area of Portugal, where he managed properties and ran a bar in the old town of Albufeira near to the marina which was called "Billys Bar". The bar still exists today and is now called the "Arte Bar". In later years he lived in Teignmouth, Devon. He was twice married and was survived by two sons from his first marriage.

In 2004 Drake was the subject of a documentary in the BBC Two Ancestors series. Titled Billy and the Fighter Boys, it focuses on his experiences with No. 1 Squadron in France in 1940, and includes the excavation of the crash site of the Hurricane he baled out off on 13 May (viewable in full in the UK here).

Drake died on 28 August 2011.

== Bibliography ==
- Cull, Brian; Lander, Bruce; Weiss, Heinrich (1999). Twelve Days in May. London: Grub Street Publishing. ISBN 978-1-902304-12-0.
- Drake, Billy; Shores, Christopher (2002). Fighter Leader: The Autobiography of Group Captain B. Drake DSO, DFC and Bar, US DFC. London: Grub Street Publishing. ISBN 978-1-90230-497-7.
- Foreman, John (2003). RAF Fighter Command Victory Claims of World War Two: Part One, 1939–1940. Red Kite. ISBN 978-0-9538061-8-8.
- Franks, Norman L.R. (2015). Dowding's Eagles : Accounts of Twenty-Five Battle of Britain Veterans. Havertown: Pen and Sword. ISBN 978-1-4738-4423-0.
- Price, Dr Alfred (1996). Spitfire Mark I/II Aces 1939-41. Oxford: Osprey Publishing. ISBN 978-1-85532-627-9.
- Price, Dr Alfred (1997). Spitfire Mark V Aces 1941–1945. Oxford: Osprey Publishing. ISBN 978-185532-6354.
- Shores, Christopher; Ring, Hans (1969). Fighters over the desert: the air battles in the Western Desert, June 1940 to December 1942. London, UK: Neville Spearman. ISBN 978-0-85435-060-5.
- Shores, Christopher; Williams, Clive (1994). Aces High. London: Grub Street. ISBN 978-1-898697-00-8.
- Shores, Christopher (2008). Aces High: A Further Tribute to the Most Notable Fighter Pilots of the British and Commonwealth Air Forces in World War II. London: Grub Street. ISBN 978-1-90230-403-8.
- Shores, Christopher F.; Ring, Hans; Hess, William N. (1975). Fighters Over Tunisia. London, UK: Neville Spearman. ISBN 978-0-85435-210-4.
- Shores, Christopher F.; Massimello, Giovanni; Guest, Russell (2012). A History of the Mediterranean Air War, 1940–1945 Volume 2: North African Desert, February 1942 – March 1943. London, UK: Grub Street. ISBN 978-1-909166-12-7.
- Tate, Robert (2008). Hans-Joachim Marseille: An Illustrated Tribute to the Luftwaffe's "Star of Africa". Atglen, Pennsylvania: Schiffer Publishing. ISBN 978-0-7643-2940-1.
- Thomas, Andrew (2005). Tomahawk and Kittyhawk Aces of the RAF and Commonwealth. Oxford: Osprey Publishing. ISBN 978-1-84176-083-4.
- Thomas, Andrew (2016). Spitfire Aces of the Channel Front 1941-43. Oxford: Osprey Publishing. ISBN 978-147281-258-2.
