= Xarolla Windmill =

Windmill in Żurrieq, Malta

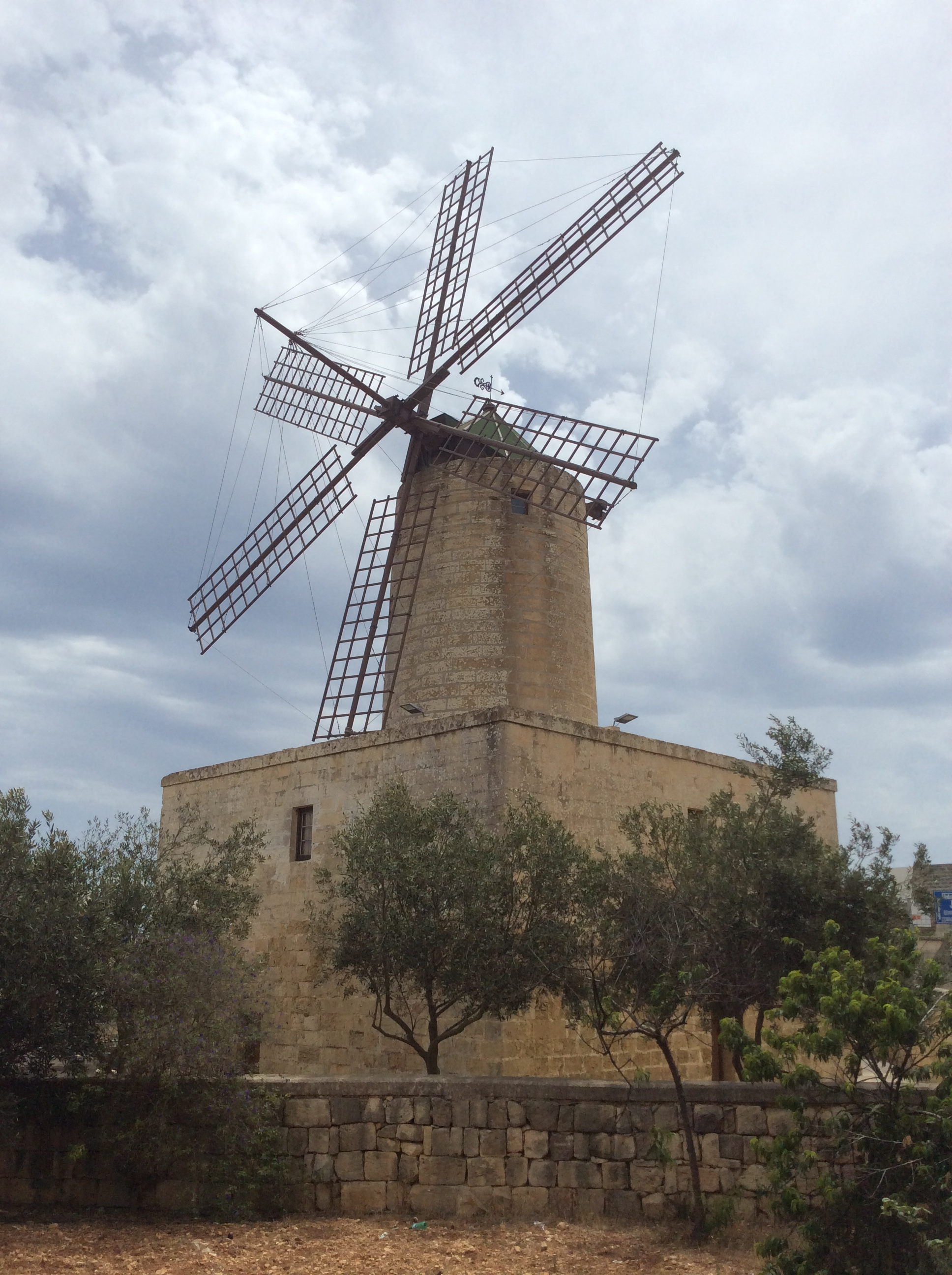
- Xarolla Windmill

Origin
- Coordinates: 35°49′54.5″N 14°28′50.5″E
- Year built: 1724

Information
- Purpose: Corn mill
- Type: Tower mill
- No. of sails: Six sails
- Type of sails: Common sails

The Xarolla Windmill at Żurrieq, Malta is one of the windmills constructed by the Order of St. John in the villages and towns of Malta. It was built in the 18th century and is presently one of the most preserved windmills in Malta. The windmill is an agri-tourism attraction and is found in a complex of agricultural buildings such as a farmhouse, a chapel, catacombs and others. The windmill is also used as an art studio.

In 1674 Grand Master Nicolas Cotoner built five windmills around Malta, one of which was tax-Xarolla. Tax-Xarolla Windmill was built by Grand Master Antonio Manoel de Vilhena in 1724. Sometimes after 1998, this was restored to its original working order. It is now the only functioning windmill on the islands of Malta. This is a valuable witness of local culture and heritage; it still has parts of the original mechanisms and can still grind the wheat. In the year 2000, this building was passed over to be administered by the Żurrieq Local Council and is intended to serve also as a cultural centre. The sails were extensively damaged in a gale on 18 March 2022.
