= Tat-Tmien Kantunieri Windmill =

- Il-Mitħna Tat-Tmien Kantunieri
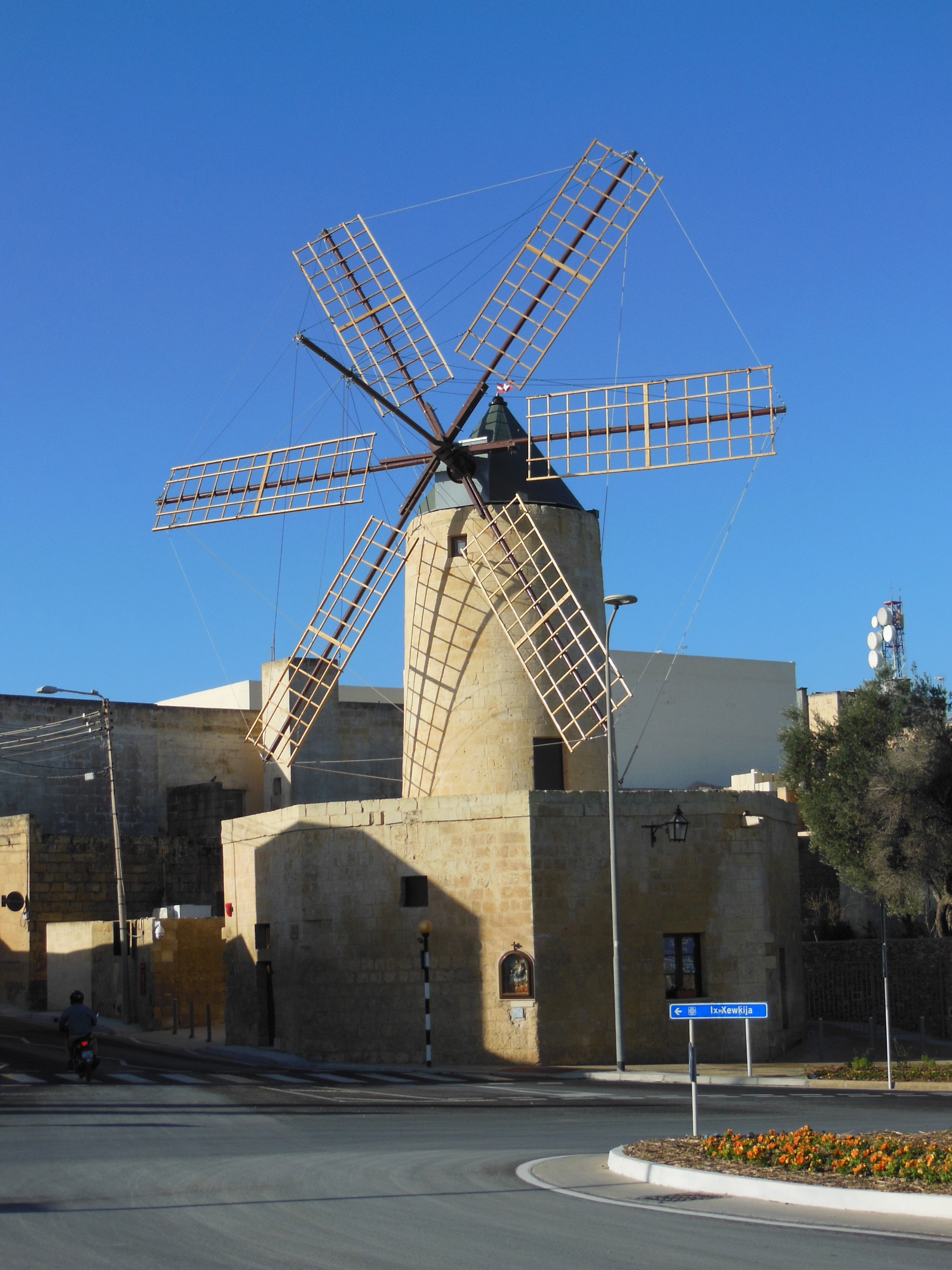
- Xewkija Windmill, Il-Mitħna Tax-Xewkija
- Interactive map of the Tat-Tmien Kantunieri Windmill area
- Alternative names: Il-Mitħna Ottagonali tax-Xewkija

General information
- Type: Windmill
- Location: Gozo, Triq Mgarr, Xewkija, Gozo, Malta
- Coordinates: 36°02′09.4″N 14°15′37.0″E
- Opened: 1710
- Closed: 1886

Tat-Tmien Kantunieri Windmill (Maltese: Il-Mitħna tat-Tmien Kantunieri) in Xewkija, on the main road mid-way between Victoria and Għajnsielem, stands as the oldest surviving windmill in Gozo, Malta. It has just undergone restoration after the Planning Commission approved the works to start on this historic building.

== History ==
The Tat-Tmien Kantunieri Windmill was commissioned by Grand Master Ramon Perellos y Roccaful and started operating in 1710 by the miller Ganni Scicluna (Gio Maris Xicluna). Perellos has also made Giovanni Gourgion as the Procurator of Wheat, where Giovanni would receive a commission on all grain he brought to Malta. Gourgion has his residence, which later used to be known as the Gourgion Tower in Xewkija.

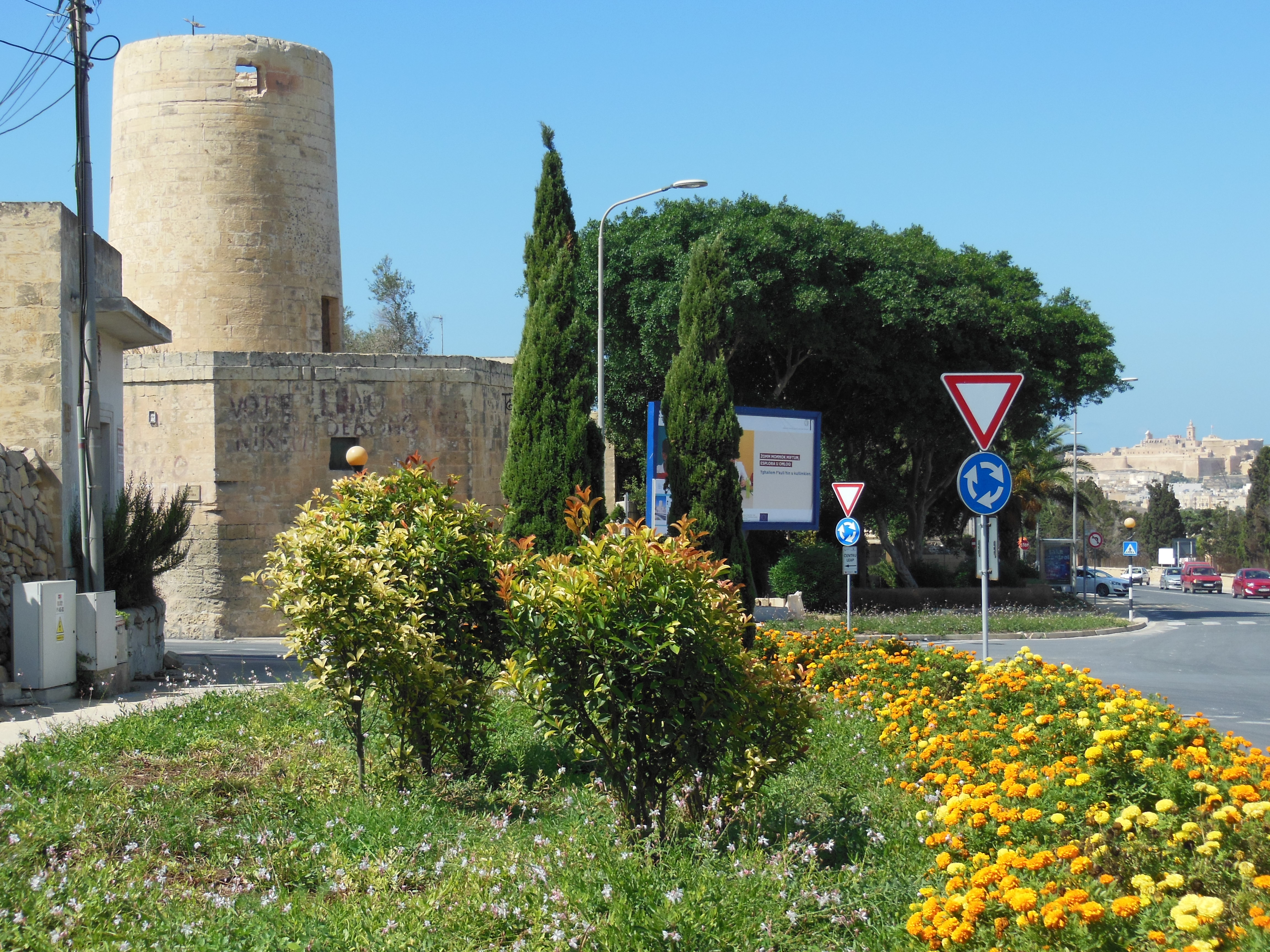
The windmill with Gozo Citadel in background

The windmill consists of a large entrance hall with two parallel rooms. At the back of the mill, there is a kitchen and the building still retain its original oven. In the middle of the mill, there is a winding staircase leading to the mill roof. Above the entrance hall, there is the birth room.

The windmill remained in use until 1886 when a fire destroyed it.

In the mid-19th century, it was owned by the three Camilleri brothers.

The windmill served as the first location for the Xewkija Band Club – Banda Prekursur. It was used as the base of this club from 1956 to 1965.

The windmill has been restored and was inaugurated on 29 January 2021. Concrete elements that were added later during the years were removed, and a small square nearby was added. The mechanical parts were re-installed.

== About ==
=== The Miller ===
The miller would grind cereals and grains, with the help of a big rotating stone driven from the eight pointed fan like sails made from wood. When the wind blows from the required direction, the miller would call his customers by a trumpet shell (Maltese: Bronja), or otherwise he would also go with his cart to collect the grains. Before this type of mill has been built, the miller had to use a blindfolded mule or ass to turn a similar stone setup, usually in a stable. These mills are considered the first industrial machines on the Maltese islands.

An interesting notary note dated 7 March 1851 was unearthed recently (2018). The note was made by Marcello Xicluna the leaseholder of the Windmill. He argued that in order to pay for the rent he had to sell various possessions he had. He asked for a reduction of his rent which was 550 scudi per annum. He had this lease from the government for the last 32 years. During that time people were constructing their 'centimolo' into their own property and thus they were milling their own corn, and were not making use of his mill. He brought other arguments too. The request was at the end refused.

=== Maltese windmills ===
Malta has the biggest density of windmills in the world, which is 1 windmill every 9sq km. This surpasses the Netherlands, which has 1 windmill every 39sq km. In the Maltese Islands, 69 windmills are known to have been built, but only about 36 still exist today. 54 windmills were built in Malta and 15 in Gozo. Only 3 windmills have sails to date. Most windmills in Malta were built by the Knights of St. John after they came from Rhodes. In 1674, the Grand Master Nicolas Cotoner ordered the building of the first five mills, with other building orders followed after. The construction period for these windmills was between 1663 till 1773. The windmill builders were assisted by the experts brought up from Mallorca, Spain. Some windmills were also used for the production of gunpowder. In 1838, the government ended the monopoly of windmills, thus everybody was allowed to build windmills. The windmills were later superseded by steam mills.
