= RAF Krendi =

Defunct RAF base in Malta

RAF Krendi
- Malta; Near Qrendi

Site information
- Type: Diversion airfield then storage base
- Owner: Now Government of Malta
- Condition: Extensively developed as mixed use developments one runway now a road

Location
- Shown within Malta
- Coordinates: 35°50′5.5″N 014°26′5.96″E

Site history
- Built: 1940
- In use: 1943–1945

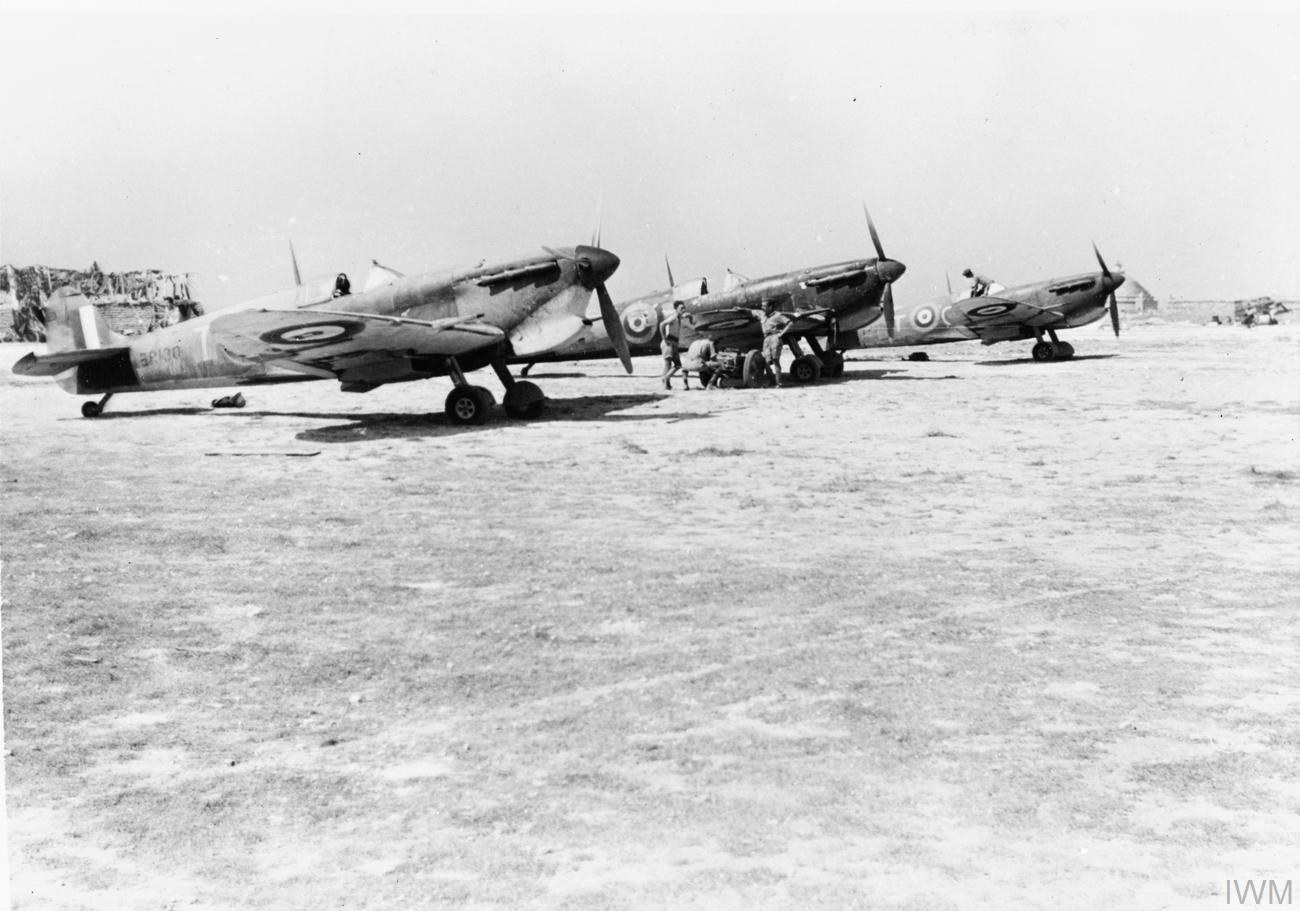
249 Squadron Supermarine Spitfires on Malta.

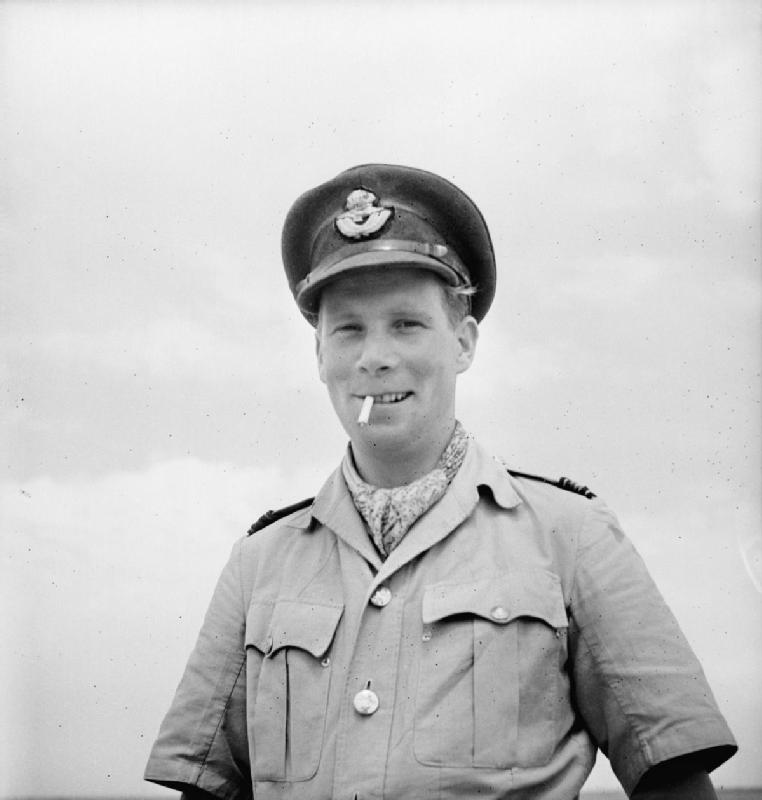
Squadron Leader Billy Drake, from June until November 1943 he led the Krendi fighter Wing in Malta, with whom he scored the last of his 20 confirmed victories

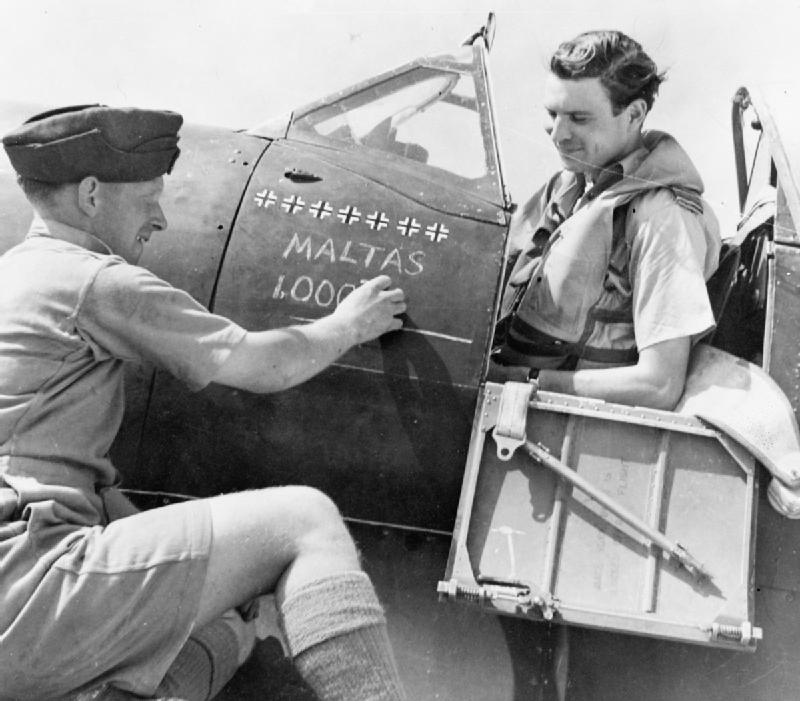
Squadron Leader J J Lynch, Commanding Officer of No. 249 Squadron RAF, sits in the cockpit of his Supermarine Spitfire Mark Vc at RAF Krendi, as an airman chalks "Malta's 1,000th" below his victory tally.

Royal Air Force Krendi, also known as RAF Qrendi, was a Royal Air Force base located on the island of Malta, near the town of Qrendi. The station was officially inaugurated in 1941 as a diversion airstrip for the main operating bases such as nearby RAF Luqa. Other diversion airstrips similar in function to Krendi were located at RAF Safi and on Malta's second island of Gozo. Later, in November 1942, the British began basing fighter squadrons at Krendi. These remained until late 1943. After the war, the airfield was used as a tracking station and vehicle park, before falling into disuse.

== History ==
=== Second World War ===
RAF Krendi was constructed at a time when Malta was under intense aerial bombardment and Malta's Air Command needed to have alternative diversion airstrips on Malta, as the RAF's main operating bases were being bombed. During construction the airfield at Krendi was used as a decoy for other main bases on Malta, switching on runway lighting as enemy bombers approached.

The station opened on 10 November 1942 and received its first squadron of Spitfires a few months later.

The base was officially inaugurated by AOC Malta Sir Keith Park in 1941; it would remain operational throughout the war in the Mediterranean.

In February 1942, RAF Krendi appears to be acting as a decoy site for RAF Luqa. Although a shortage of materials, labour and transport delayed its development, in December 1942 one runway at Krendi came into use, and after this progress became more rapid.

Weblog entries from RAF veterans based at RAF Krendi quote the following RAF fighter squadrons as being based at the airfield:

- 185 (Fighter) Squadron RAF was equipped with the Supermarine Spitfire Mk. Vc (5 June 1943 – 23 September 1943)
- 229 (Fighter) Squadron RAF was equipped with the Supermarine Spitfire Mk. Vc (10 December 1942 – 25 September 1943)
- 249 (Fighter) Squadron RAF was equipped with the Supermarine Spitfire Mk. Vc and later Mk IX (23 November 1942 – 24 September 1943).

No more Spifires or other RAF fighters were based at RAF Krendi after Autumn 1943.

=== Post war ===
After the war, Krendi was one of a number of military facilities retained on Malta by the British due to the island's strategic location. Reduced in terms of operational functionality, in 1953 it would become a vehicle storage area for British Army units. The base would also remain a weather radiosonde tracking station in the 1960s. The RAF left in 1979 following a decision not to renew the lease on RAF Luqa.

== Current use ==
Whilst RAF Krendi's concrete runways have long gone, the outline of the airfield is obvious from the air.

The runway is commonly used by vehicles heading towards Wied-iz-Zurrieq (Blue Grotto).

== See also ==
- AHQ Malta
- Siege of Malta (World War II)
- Billy Drake
- Qrendi
