= RAF Maintenance Base Safi =

Former British RAF station in Malta

RAF Safi Maintenance Base RAF Safi
- Ħal Safi in Malta

Site information
- Type: Diversion airfield then Maintenance Base
- Owner: Air Ministry; Now Government of Malta
- Operator: Royal Air Force; Now Malta Industrial Parks Ltd
- Controlled by: AHQ Malta
- Condition: Extensively developed as a hangar site

Location
- Shown within Malta RAF Safi (Europe)
- Coordinates: 35°50′30″N 014°29′30″E

Site history
- Built: 1941
- Built by: The Malta Police and Royal Hampshire Regiment
- In use: 1943-1979

Airfield information
Runways
Direction	Length and surface
10/28	1,200 metres (3,937 ft)
13/31	1,200 metres (3,937 ft)

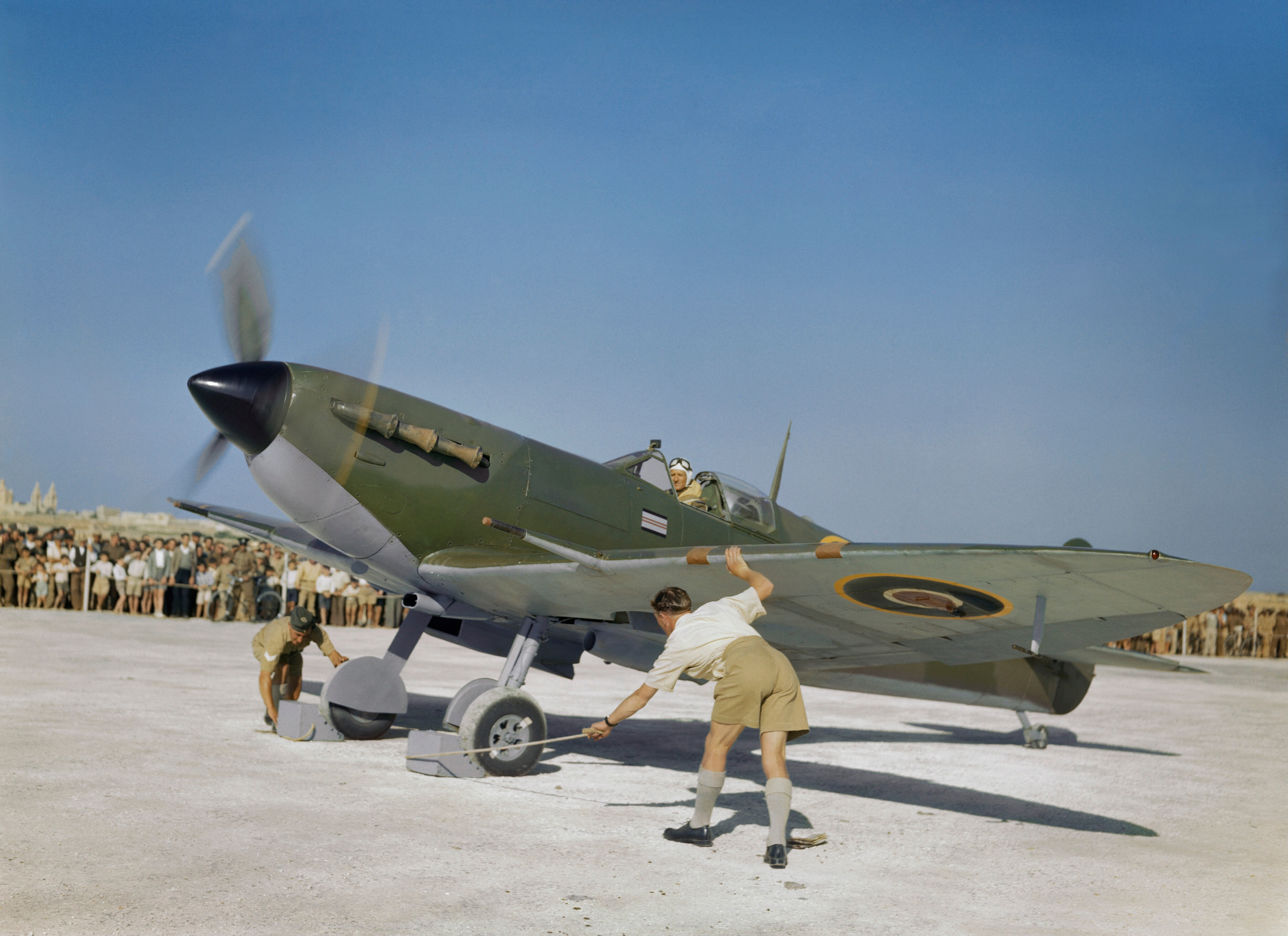
RAF Safi is officially inaugurated by Air Vice Marshal Keith Park in 1943.

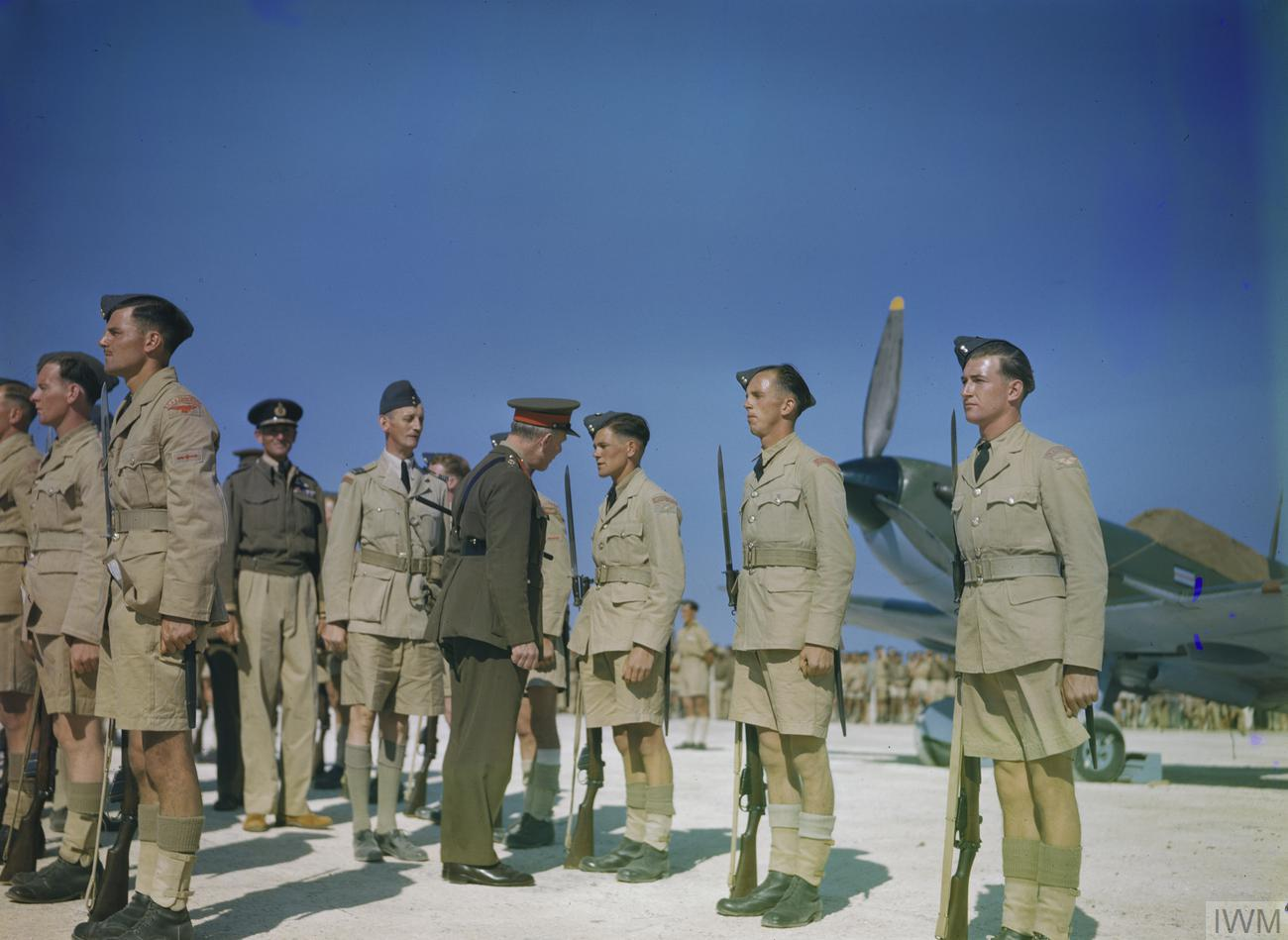
Lord Gort (Governor of Malta) inspects a RAF honour guard at RAF Safi in May 1943.

Royal Air Force Safi was a Royal Air Force maintenance base located on the island of Malta, which started life in 1941 as a diversion airstrip for the main operating bases such as nearby RAF Luqa. Other diversion airstrips similar in function to Safi were located at RAF Krendi and on Malta's second island of Gozo.

== History ==
=== Second World War ===
RAF Safi was constructed at a time when Malta was under intense aerial bombardment and Malta's Air Command needed to have alternative diversion airstrips on Malta, as the RAF's main operating bases were being bombed. Construction started in 1941 and the strips were ready for use in 1942.

The base was officially inaugurated by AOC Malta Sir Keith Park in May 1943, but had been completed by 1942; it would remain operational throughout the War in the Mediterranean.

=== Post war ===
After the war, Safi was reduced in function, becoming a maintenance base. In April 1957 the then Maltese Prime Minister Mr Dom Mintoff requested that the UK Government consider turning over RAF Safi to his government. By 1961 the RAF maintenance facility at Safi was mostly civilian staffed and discussions in London were taking place about it being run down.

The RAF left in 1979 following a British government decision not to renew the lease on RAF Luqa.

== Current use ==
Whilst Safi's runway has long gone the hangar and dispersal area have been extensively redeveloped and two large hangars constructed which are associated with the international airport at Luqa, which has absorbed the site. There is also a neighbouring aviation business park development.

== See also ==
- AHQ Malta
- Siege of Malta (World War II)
- Safi, Malta
