= Xewkija =

Xewkija Ix-Xewkija Casal Xeuchia, Casal Sceuchia
- Local council
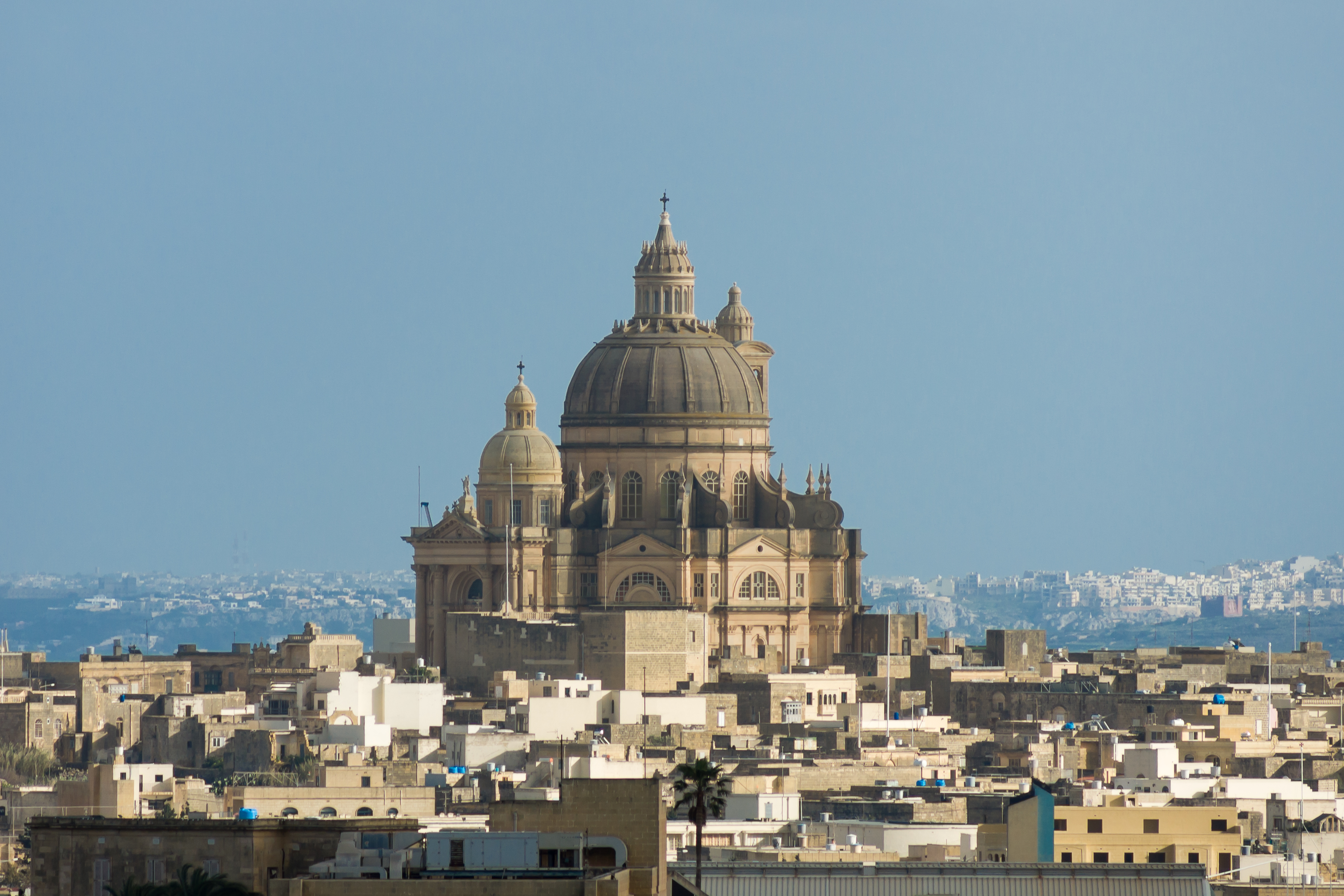
- Rotunda of Xewkija

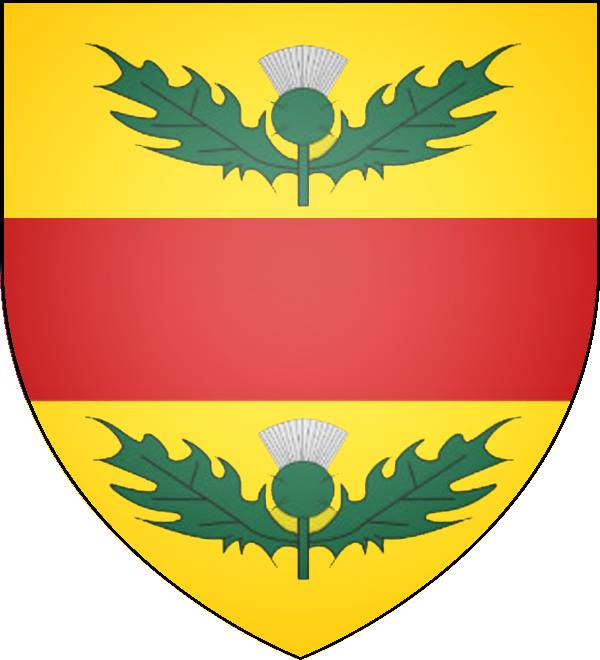
- Flag Coat of arms
- Motto: Nemo me impune lacessit
- Coordinates: 36°1′59″N 14°15′30″E
- Country: Malta
- Region: Gozo Region
- District: Gozo and Comino District
- Borders: Fontana, Għajnsielem, Munxar, Sannat, Victoria, Xagħra

Government
  - Mayor: Simona Refalo (PL)

Area
  - Total: 4.5 km^{2} (1.7 sq mi)

Population (July 2024)
  - Total: 3,687
  - Density: 820/km^{2} (2,100/sq mi)
- Demonym(s): Xewki (m), Xewkija (f), Xewkin (pl)
- Time zone: UTC+1 (CET)
  - Summer (DST): UTC+2 (CEST)
- Postal code: XWK
- Dialing code: 356
- ISO 3166 code: MT-62
- Patron saint: John the Baptist
- Day of festa: 24 June (nativity); 29 August (martyrdom)
- Website: Official website

Xewkija (Maltese: Ix-Xewkija, Italian: Casal Xeuchia, pronounced and written as Casal Sceuchia) is an administrative unit and village of Malta, on the island of Gozo. The population of Xewkija was 3,687 in July 2024. This included 1,898 males and 1,789 females; 3,054 Maltese nationals and 633 foreign nationals.

== History ==
Xewkija, which is between Għajnsielem and the main town of Victoria, is the oldest village in Gozo. It became the first parish outside Victoria on 27 November 1678. Bishop Miguel Jerónimo de Molina separated it from the Matrix. Dun Grezz Farrugia, from Valletta, became its first parish priest. It became the first district contrada known as casale "village".

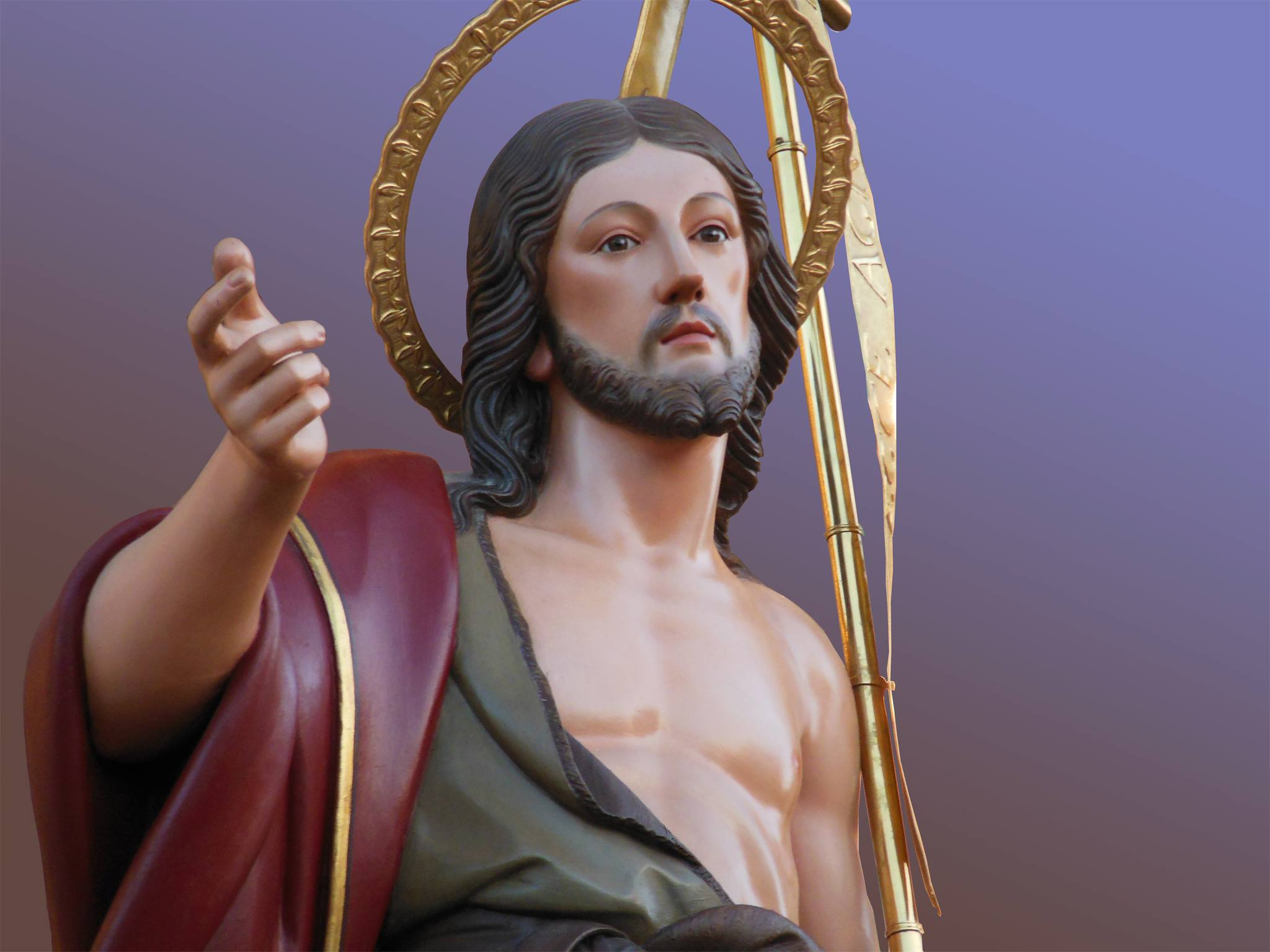
Titular statue of John the Baptist

The name is derived from Arabic: شَوْك, romanized: šawk, lit. 'thistles, thorns'. Xewkija is famous for its church, The Rotunda of Xewkija, which is dedicated to John the Baptist, is the seat of the Knights Hospitaller, built from Maltese stone by local masons and craftsmen. The church is the largest in Gozo and its dome dominates the village. Its architect was Ġużè Damato. It replaced an older church. The titular statue of Saint John the Baptist was sculpted in wood by Pietro Paolo Azzopardi in 1845.

On the site where the present church is, it was said that a stone was known as 'Maqgħad ix-Xiħ'. Near it, there is a small ancient chapel known as Madonna tal-Ħniena "Our Lady of Charity", dedicated to San Bartilimew. The Santa Cecilia Tower had been within the limits of Xewkija. There is another tower with the oldest sundial in Xewkija. Remains of Tinghi Tower disappeared in the 20th century. These towers date back to 1613. The Gourgion Tower, built in 1690, was demolished during the Second World War to make way for a temporary airstrip.

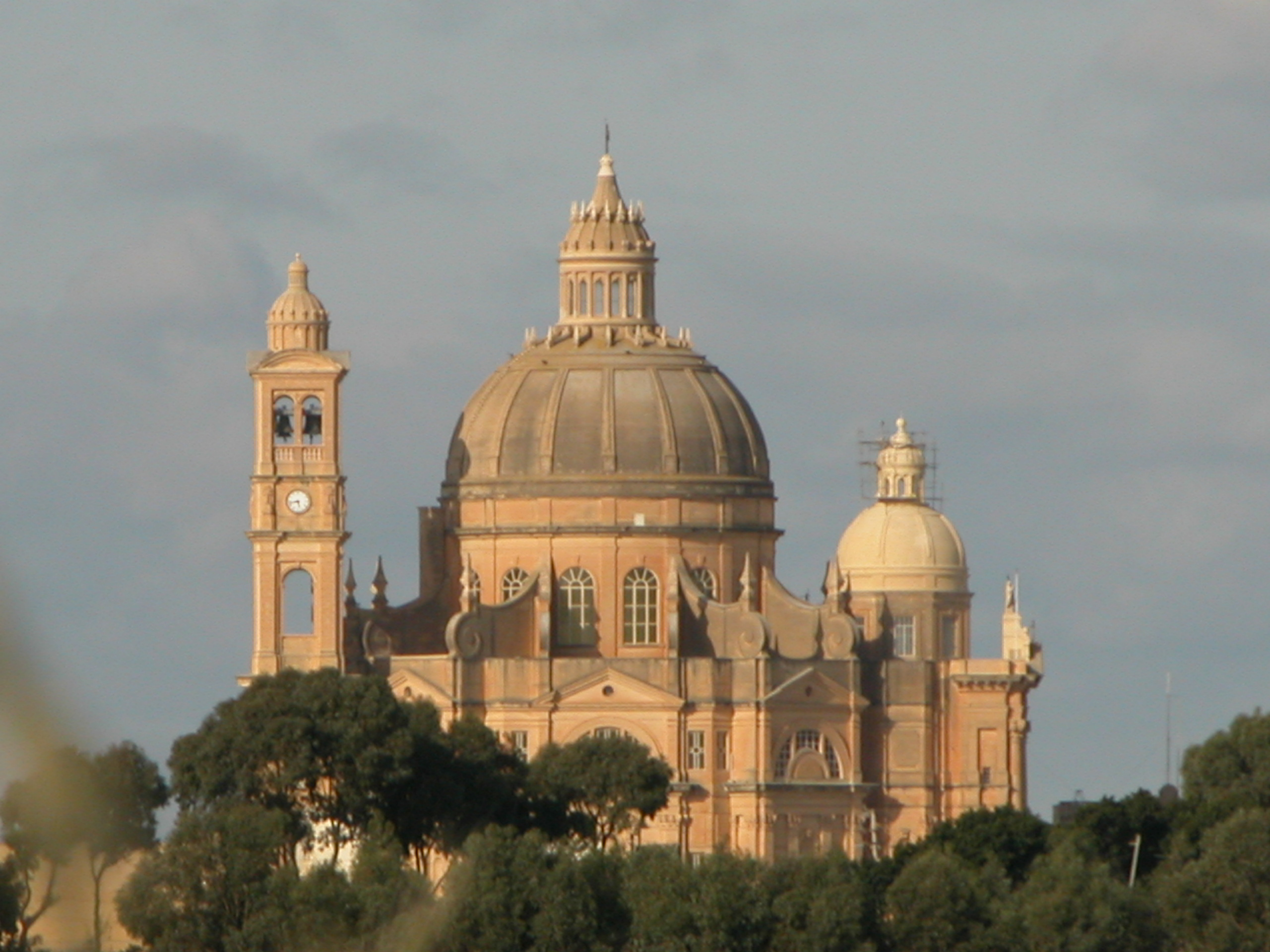
Front cuppola of the church being built

The Maymūnah Stone, with an Arabic inscription dating back to 1174, was possibly found in Xewkija. It commemorates the death of an Arab girl named Maymūnah. The inscription is carved in a thick marble slab, on the underside of which there is a Roman symbol. Brother Gabrijel D'Alappo translated it into Italian; it was later translated into Maltese. It was sent to the Public Library in Malta in 1845 and brought to the Gozo Museum of Archaeology in 1960.

The Banda Prekursur (Precursor Band) is the oldest organization in Xewkija. It was set up on 13 May 1929. Lorenzo Zammit Haber, Marcell Mercieca, Giuseppe Buttigieg, Giovanni Haber, and Tomaso Attard were among its founders. Lorenzo Zammit Haber was the first President and Secretary.

The coat of arms of Xewkija is a shield on a gold background with a red horizontal strip between two thorns, one above and one below. The motto of Xewkija is 'Nemo me impune lacessit', that is, 'No one shall attack me with impunity'.

A helicopter service once ran between Malta International Airport and the Xewkija Heliport.

== Facilities ==
The University of Malta (Gozo Campus) and the offices of the Employment & Training Corporation are in the suburbs of the village. There are also the Gozo Stadium, the Government Farm, St. Mary's Cemetery, Xewkija Cemetery and an industrial estate which employs hundreds of Gozitan workers.

The rising population in Xewkija needed more building sites for houses and housing estates have been developed at Tal-Barmil, Ta' Ġokk and Tal-Ħamrija.

On entering the village from the main road, one sees the remains of the Tat-Tmien Kantunieri Windmill erected in the times of Grand Master Ramon Perellos y Roccaful. This is a unique mill in Gozo because it has points which show the eight principal wind directions.

At Misraħ Imbert one can see the cart ruts, coming from Borġ Għarib, Mġarr ix-Xini, Ta' Ċenċ and Tas-Salvatur.

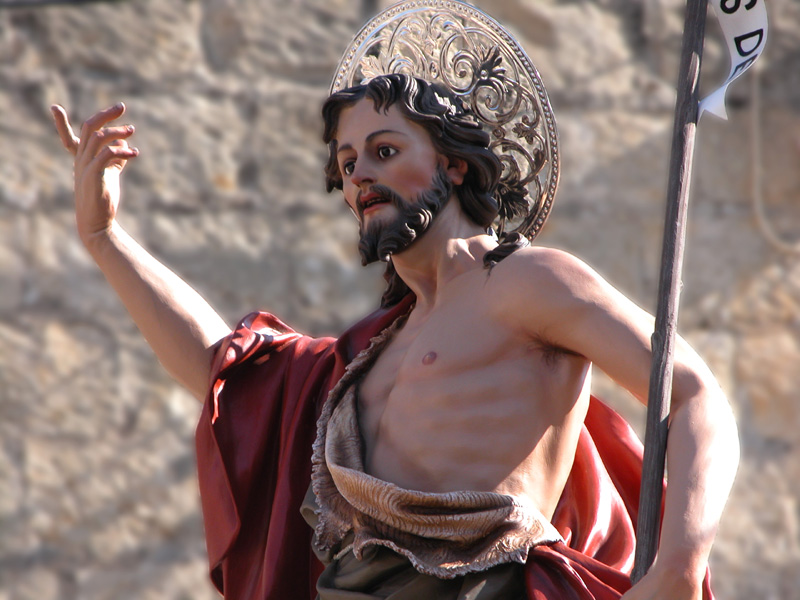
Statue of Saint John

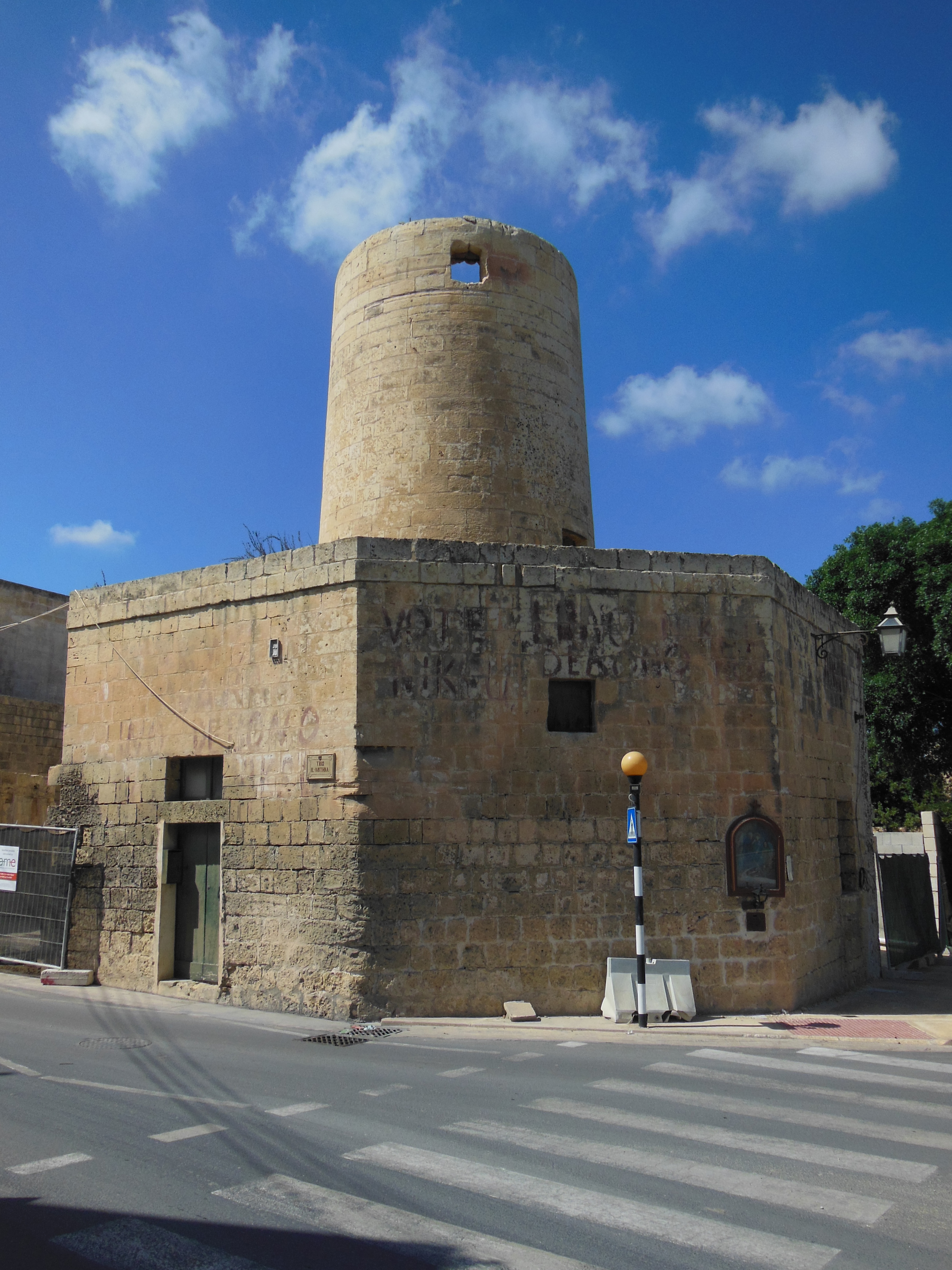
The Octagonal base Windmill in Xewkija Gozo build by Perellos order which started operating in 1710.

== Twin towns – sister cities ==
Xewkija is twinned with:

- Castelvenere, Italy
- Modica, Italy
- Pachino, Italy

== Notable people ==
- Dun Guzepp Attard
- Dun Grezz Farrugia
- Maria Grech
- Rosa Magro

== See also ==
- Gozo farmhouse
