= Xewkija Heliport =

Xewkija / Gozo Heliport Il-Heliport tax-Xewkija
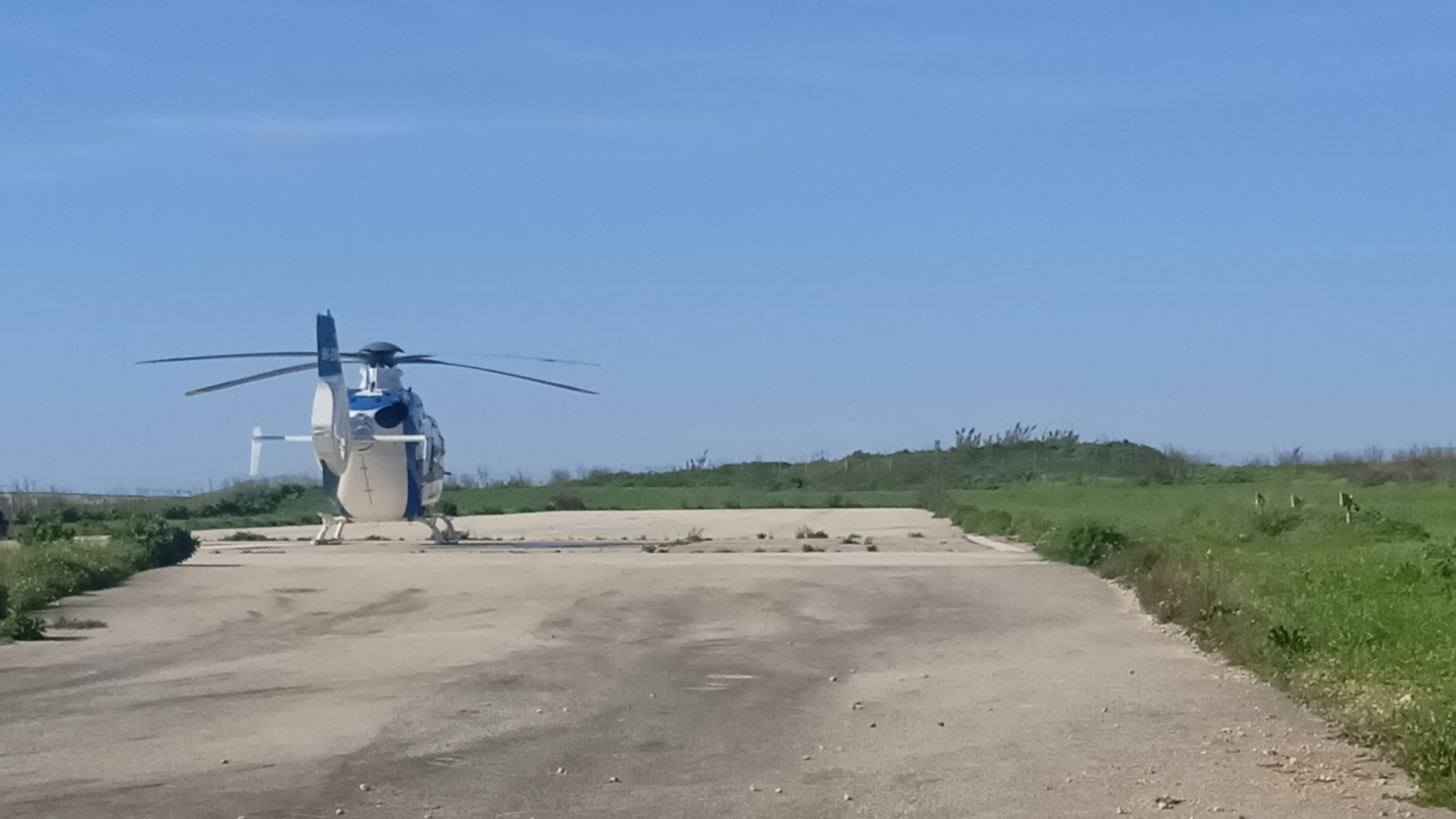

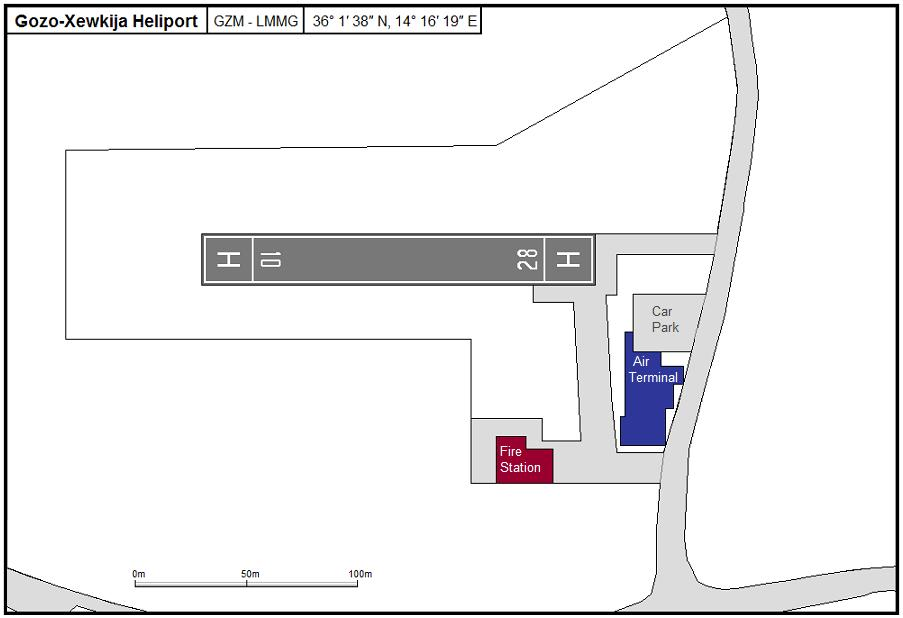
- A schematic of the heliport's layout
- IATA: GZM; ICAO: LMMG

Summary
- Airport type: Public
- Serves: Gozo
- Location: Xewkija, Malta
- Elevation AMSL: 322 ft / 98 m
- Coordinates: 36°01′38″N 014°16′19″E

Map
- Location on a map of Malta

Runways
Direction	Length		Surface
Direction	m	ft	Surface
10/28	174	571	Concrete/asphalt

Xewkija Heliport (IATA: GZM, ICAO: LMMG), also known as Gozo Heliport, is a small heliport on the island of Gozo in Malta, near the town of Xewkija.

== Facilities ==
It has two helipads, with a width of 22 metres (72 ft) connected by asphalt, to form a small 174 metres (571 feet) long runway in the 10/28 direction.

As of 2021, It is being examined if the current short runway could be expanded to allow fixed-wing aircraft STOL to land at Xewkija.

== Flights ==
There used to be scheduled helicopter flights between Malta International Airport and Xewkija Heliport. These were started by Malta Air Charter in 1990, which ceased to operate in 2004. From March 2005 until October 2006 the flights were conducted by Helicópteros del Sureste. Currently, no scheduled flights take place from the heliport. However, Heli Link Malta and HeliFly`s Malta offers flights between the heliport and Malta on request.
