= 2018–19 Maltese FA Trophy =

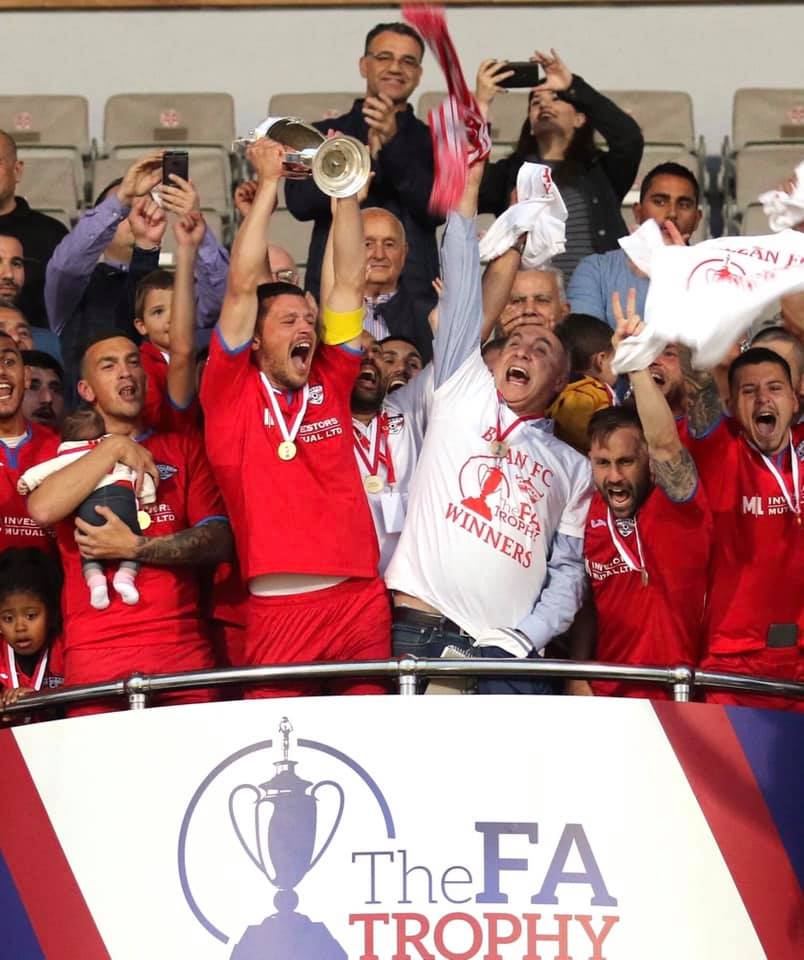
- Balzan team celebrating with the FA Trophy

Tournament details
- Country: Malta
- Dates: 1 September 2018 – 18 May 2019
- Teams: 67

Final positions
- Champions: Balzan (1st title)
- Runners-up: Valletta

Tournament statistics
- Matches played: 66
- Goals scored: 257 (3.89 per match)
- All statistics correct as of 19 May 2019.

The 2018–19 Maltese FA Trophy was the 81st edition of the football cup competition. A record number of 67 clubs competed in the FA Trophy, with the first round starting on the weekend of 1–2 September 2018 and concluding with the final played on 18 May 2019.

Valletta were the defending champions, but lost in the final to Balzan on penalties, the latter winning their first ever FA Trophy title.

== Format ==
The clubs in the Premier League, First Division, Second Division and Third Division together with those from the Gozo Football League are involved in the draws of the initial rounds. The 14 top-flight sides enter the fray in the third round. Matches which are level after regulation advanced to extra time and afterwards to penalties to determine a winner, when needed.

	Clubs entering in this round	Clubs advancing from previous round
Preliminary round (16 clubs)	9 clubs from Gozo Football League; 7 clubs from Maltese Third Division	N/A
First round (18 clubs)	5 clubs from Gozo Football League; 5 clubs from Maltese Third Division	8 winners from Preliminary round
Second round (36 clubs)	14 clubs from Maltese First Division; 13 clubs from Maltese Second Division	9 winners from First round
Third round (32 clubs)	14 clubs from Maltese Premier League	18 winners from Second round
Fourth round (16 clubs)	No other entries	16 winners from Third round
Quarter-finals (8 clubs)	No other entries	8 winners from Fourth round
Semi-finals (4 clubs)	No other entries	4 winners from Quarter-finals
Final (2 clubs)	No other entries	2 winners from Semi-finals

== Schedule ==
The draws were made on 6 August 2018 and were conducted by Dr. Angelo Chetcuti, the General Secretary of the Malta Football Association, and Rodney Pisani, the Deputy General Secretary of the Association who leads the Competitions Department.

Round	Date(s)	Draw date	Number of fixtures	Clubs
Preliminary round	1–2 September 2018	6 August 2018	8	67 → 59
First round	8–9 September 2018	6 August 2018	9	59 → 50
Second round	26–28 October 2018	6 August 2018	18	50 → 32
Third round	30 November and 2 December 2018	5 November 2018	16	32 → 16
Fourth round	26–27 January 2019	5 November 2018	8	16 → 8
Quarter-finals	23 February, 4–5 May 2019	29 January 2019	4	8 → 4
Semi-finals	7–8 May 2019	5 May 2019	2	4 → 2
Final	12 May 2019	5 May 2019	1	2 → 1

== Preliminary round ==
Eight preliminary round matches were played on 31 August till 2 September 2018. The draw for the preliminary, first, and second rounds was held on 6 August 2018.

31 August 2018	Oratory Youths (Gozo)	0–8	Għajnsielem (Gozo)	Xewkija
18:00 CEST		Report	Naby 5', 58'; Luis Andre 7', 19', 31', 52', 83'; Belhadj 39'	Stadium: Gozo Stadium; Referee: Massimo Axisa

31 August 2018	Munxar Falcons (Gozo)	0–4	Nadur Youngsters (Gozo)	Xewkija
20:00 CEST		Report	de Jesus Messias 48', 88'; Barbosa 50', 74'	Stadium: Gozo Stadium; Referee: Slawomir Olucha

1 September 2018	St. Lawrence Spurs (Gozo)	0–2	Għaxaq (4)	Kerċem
18:00 CEST		Report	Calleja 47'; Agius 62'	Stadium: Kerċem Ajax Stadium; Referee: Mario Apap

1 September 2018	Marsaskala (4)	0–4	Dingli Swallows (4)	Ta' Qali
19:00 CEST		Report	Vassallo 35'; Borg 45'; Ciantar 87'; Schembri 90+1'	Stadium: Centenary Stadium; Referee: Trustin Farrugia Cann

1 September 2018	Sannat Lions (Gozo)	2–0	Ta' Xbiex (4)	Kerċem
20:00 CEST	Okpokwu 19', 78'	Report		Stadium: Kerċem Ajax Stadium; Referee: Andrea Schiriha

2 September 2018	Qala Saints (Gozo)	1–3	Għargħur (4)	Kerċem
18:00 CEST	Buttigieg 28'	Report	Tasic 14', 42' (pen.); Izuchukwu 68'	Stadium: Kerċem Ajax Stadium; Referee: Kurt Saliba

2 September 2018	Victoria Wanderers (Gozo)	10–0	Mtarfa (4)	Xewkija
18:00 CEST	Djordjevic 18' (pen.), 70', 78'; Obaje 39', 80', 88'; Bamba 23'; Adesina 20'; Harland 32'; Cardona 86'	Report		Stadium: Gozo Stadium; Referee: Keith Montebello

2 September 2018	Victoria Hotspurs (Gozo)	8–0	Msida St. Joseph (4)	Xewkija
20:00 CEST	Maciel 10', 80', 82'; Mizzi 61', 65'; Elton 52', 57'; Debrincat 50'	Report		Stadium: Gozo Stadium; Referee: Daniel Casha

== First round ==
Nine first-round matches were played on 8-9 September 2018. The draw for the preliminary, first, and second rounds was held 6 August 2018.

6 September 2018	Għarb Rangers (Gozo)	2–1	Xgħajra Tornadoes (4)	Xewkija
18:00 CEST	Attard 19', 22'	Report	Degiorgio 63'	Stadium: Gozo Stadium; Referee: Joseph Scerri

6 September 2018	Għajnsielem (Gozo)	0–2	Xewkija Tigers (Gozo)	Xewkija
20:00 CEST		Report	Bugeja 30'; Stojanovic 41'	Stadium: Gozo Stadium; Referee: Paul Toledo

8 September 2018	Żurrieq (4)	0–4	Nadur Youngsters (Gozo)	St. Paul's Bay
18:00 CEST		Report	Bustos 45' (pen.); Barbosa 60', 72'; de Jesus Messias 68'	Stadium: Sirens Stadium; Referee: Daniel Portelli

8 September 2018	Kirkop United (4)	2–1	Kerċem Ajax (Gozo)	St. Paul's Bay
20:15 CEST	Darboe 67'; Degiorgio 90+3'	Report	Komljenovi 27'	Stadium: Sirens Stadium; Referee: Slawomir Olucha

9 September 2018	Dingli Swallows (4)	1–2	Sannat Lions (Gozo)	St. Paul's Bay
18:00 CEST	Scerri 16'	Report	Tabone 39'; Okpokwu 67' (pen.)	Stadium: Sirens Stadium; Referee: Etienne Antoine Mangion

9 September 2018	Victoria Wanderers (Gozo)	0–0 (a.e.t.) (1–4 p)	Għaxaq (4)	Xewkija
18:00 CEST		Report		Stadium: Gozo Stadium; Referee: Slawomir Olucha
	Penalties
	Monday (penalty missed); Dpordevic (penalty scored); Bamba (penalty missed)		(penalty scored) Calleja; (penalty scored) Vella; (penalty scored) Micallef; (penalty scored) Agius

9 September 2018	Victoria Hotspurs (Gozo)	4–1	Attard (4)	Xewkija
18:00 CEST	Mizzi 4', 55'; Camilleri 64'; Maciel 80'	Report	Spiteri 35'	Stadium: Gozo Stadium; Referee: Slobodan Petrovic

9 September 2018	Żebbuġ Rovers (Gozo)	0–1	Mdina Knights (4)	Kerċem
18:00 CEST		Report	Vella 57'	Stadium: Kerċem Ajax Stadium; Referee: Ezekiel Barbara

9 September 2018	Għargħur (4)	3–1	Xagħra United (Gozo)	St. Paul's Bay
20:15 CEST	Zammit 31', 75'; Tasic 90+5'	Report	Camilleri 42' (pen.)	Stadium: Sirens Stadium; Referee: Emanuel Grech

== Second round ==
Eighteen second round matches were played on 26 and 28 October 2018. The draw for the preliminary, first, and second rounds was held 6 August 2018. AAll teams from Maltese First Division and Maltese Second Division entered in the Second round.

26 October 2018	Mellieħa (3)	2–0	Kalkara (3)	Ħamrun
18:00 CEST	Wayne Chetcuti 63'; David Fenech 90+2'	Report		Stadium: Victor Tedesco Stadium; Referee: Andrea Sciriha

26 October 2018	Kirkop United (4)	1–2 (a.e.t.)	Vittoriosa Stars (2)	Pembroke
19:00 CEST	Caruana 90+3' (pen.)	Report	Cilia 50'; Marcelo De Souza 98'	Stadium: Luxol Stadium; Referee: Alex Johnson

26 October 2018	Gudja United (2)	2–1	Sirens (2)	Ħamrun
20:15 CEST	Ratko Mandic 48' (o.g.); Kooh Sohna Rafael 81'	Report	Luka Mijic 47'	Stadium: Victor Tedesco Stadium; Referee: Mario Apap

27 October 2018	St. George's (3)	0–4	Lija Athletic (2)	Pembroke
15:00 CEST		Report	Beu 26'; Mintoff 38'; Azzopardi 43'; Schembri 90+1'	Stadium: Luxol Stadium; Referee: Daniel Casha

27 October 2018	St. Venera Lightnings (3)	0–3	Pembroke Athleta (2)	St. Paul's Bay
15:00 CEST		Report	Jean Pierre Mifsud Triganza 62', 63', 65'	Stadium: Sirens Stadium; Referee: Sandro Spiteri

27 October 2018	Mġarr United (3)	1–2	San Ġwann (2)	Pembroke
17:15 CEST	Aquilina 71'	Report	Tanti 26'; Pompeo 31'	Stadium: Luxol Stadium; Referee: Slobodan Petrovic

27 October 2018	Xewkija Tigers (Gozo)	6–1	Mqabba (2)	Gozo
16:00 CEST	Daniel Bogdanović 11'; Cadu 26' (pen.), 28', 51'; Bajada 66', 78'	Report	Micallef 71'	Stadium: Kerċem Ajax Stadium; Referee: Glenn Tonna

27 October 2018	Marsa (2)	5–1	Għargħur (4)	St. Paul's Bay
17:15 CEST	Gauci 16' (pen.); De Fex 19'; Farrugia 68'; Busuttil 71' (pen.); Friggieri 78'	Report	Bonello 28'	Stadium: Sirens Stadium; Referee: Daniel Portelli

28 October 2018	Melita (3)	1–0	Swieqi United (2)	Pembroke
17:15 CEST	Gatt 64'	Report		Stadium: Luxol Stadium; Referee: Darryl Agius

28 October 2018	Sannat Lions (Gozo)	0–3	Qrendi (2)	Gozo
14:00 CEST		Report	Vargas 28'; Zarb 45'; Abela 73'	Stadium: Kerċem Ajax Stadium; Referee: Shaun Calleja

28 October 2018	Żebbuġ Rangers (2)	1–0	Marsaxlokk (3)	Ħamrun
15:00 CEST	Micallef 85'	Report		Stadium: Victor Tedesco Stadium; Referee: Trustin Farrugia Cann

28 October 2018	Naxxar Lions (2)	1–2	Żejtun Corinthians (2)	Ħamrun
17:15 CEST	Bonnici 62'	Report	Castano 20'; Farrugia 60'	Stadium: Victor Tedesco Stadium; Referee: Aleksander Jovanovic

28 October 2018	Victoria Hotspurs (Gozo)	1–1 (a.e.t.) (5–6 p)	Siġġiewi (3)	Gozo
16:15 CEST	Mercieca 3'	Report	Nikolic 62'	Stadium: Kerċem Ajax Stadium; Referee: Ezekiel Barbara
	Penalties
	Maciel (penalty scored); Mercieca (penalty scored); Lattes (penalty scored); Vella (penalty missed); Elton (penalty scored); Bajada (penalty scored); Mizzi (penalty missed)		(penalty scored) Nikolic; (penalty scored) Buhagiar; (penalty scored) Grech; (penalty missed) Ciappara; (penalty scored) Camilleri; (penalty scored) Magri; (penalty scored) Formosa

28 October 2018	Mdina Knights (4)	2–1 (a.e.t.)	Għarb Rangers (Gozo)	St. Paul's Bay
15:00 CEST	Nunez 75' (o.g.); Sciberras 105'	Report	Shkjau 57'	Stadium: Sirens Stadium; Referee: Massimo Axisa

28 October 2018	Luqa St. Andrew's (3)	0–5	Rabat Ajax (3)	St. Paul's Bay
17:15 CEST		Report	Abela 11'; Azzopardi 50'; Scholey 89', 90'; Muscat 90+1'	Stadium: Sirens Stadium; Referee: Paul Toledo

28 October 2018	Fgura United (3)	4–1 (a.e.t.)	Għaxaq (4)	Pembroke
15:00 CEST	Sell 72', 95', 120'; Borg 110'	Report	Ellul 51'	Stadium: Luxol Stadium; Referee: Slawomir Olucha

28 October 2018	Santa Lucia (2)	2–2 (a.e.t.) (2–4 p)	Birżebbuġa St. Peter's (3)	Ta' Qali
17:15 CEST	Lapira 16'; Borg 42'	Report	Pirotta 70', 77'	Stadium: Centenary Stadium; Referee: Malcolm Spiteri
	Penalties
	Adebayo (penalty scored); Mendonza (penalty scored)		(penalty scored) Camilleri; (penalty scored) Cutajar; (penalty scored) Micallef; (penalty scored) Pedrosa

28 October 2018	Żabbar St. Patrick (3)	0–7	Nadur Youngsters (Gozo)	Ta' Qali
15:00 CEST		Report	Daniel Mateo Bustos 12', 42'; De Jesus Messias 26', 82'; Lagana 45' (o.g.); Barboso 47' (pen.); Tabone 60'	Stadium: Centenary Stadium; Referee: Stefan Pace

== Third round ==
Sixteen third round matches were played on 30 November and 3 December 2018. The draw for the third and fourth rounds was held 5 November 2018. All teams from Maltese Premier League entered in Third round. The top six position from 2017-18 Maltese Premier League teams that are seeded in the third round of the FA Trophy. A total of thirty-two clubs will be involved in the draw.

30 November 2018	Birżebbuġa St. Peter's (3)	0–5	Żebbuġ Rangers (2)	Ta' Qali
18:00 CEST			Ryan Micallef 9'; Thiago Rocha Rodrigo 27', 50'; Ze Lucas Caetano 31', 74'	Stadium: Centenary Stadium; Referee: Sandro Spiteri

30 November 2018	Qormi (1)	1–5	Hibernians (1)	Ta' Qali
19:00 CEST	Manolito Micallef 50' (pen.)		Taylon Nicolas Correa 11', 13', 16'; Jurgen Degabriele 60'; Isaac Ntow 88'	Stadium: Ta' Qali National Stadium; Referee: Stefan Pace

30 November 2018	Mdina Knights (4)	1–4	Pietà Hotspurs (1)	Ta' Qali
20:15 CEST	Cachel Vella 88'		Shunsuke Nakamura 33', 64'; Jan Bussuttil 57'; James Scicluna 90+1' (pen.)	Stadium: Centenary Stadium; Referee: Ismael Barbara

1 December 2018	Gżira United (1)	4–0	Rabat Ajax (3)	Ta' Qali
14:00 CEST	Corbalan Juan Carlos 37', 66'; Andrew Cohen 79'; Zachary Scerri 83'			Stadium: Centenary Stadium; Referee: Malcolm Spiteri

1 December 2018	San Ġwann (2)	0–1	Fgura United (3)	Ħamrun
14:00 CEST			Thomas Grech 77'	Stadium: Victor Tedesco Stadium; Referee: Alex Johnson

1 December 2018	Balzan (1)	5–1	Qrendi (2)	Ta' Qali
16:15 CEST	Kadu Carlos Eduardo Mendes 10'; Andrija Majdevac 17', 43', 72'; Correa Duarte Ricardo 30'		Ciro Quaranta 24'	Stadium: Centenary Stadium; Referee: Matthew De Gabbrielle

1 December 2018	Siġġiewi (3)	1–3	Melita (3)	Ħamrun
16:15 CEST	Kim Buhagiar 78'		Luke Mifsud 40', 83'; Karl Mohnani 63' (pen.)	Stadium: Victor Tedesco Stadium; Referee: Daniel Portelli

2 December 2018	Floriana (1)	0–1	Ħamrun Spartans (1)	Ta' Qali
16:00 CEST			Wilfried Domoraud 31'	Stadium: Ta' Qali National Stadium; Referee: Alan Mario Sant

2 December 2018	Nadur Youngsters (Gozo)	0–4	Birkirkara (1)	Xewkija
14:00 CEST			Marcelinho de Siquiera Henrique 28'; Danilo Quipapa Chapoval 30'; Petar Orlandic 49'; Paul Fenech 62'	Stadium: Gozo Stadium; Referee: Trustin Farrugia Cann

2 December 2018	Marsa (2)	0–3	Valletta (1)	Ta' Qali
16:15 CEST			Jean Borg 19'; Miguel Alba 52' (pen.); Matteo Piccollo 59'	Stadium: Centenary Stadium; Referee: Etienne Antoine Mangion

2 December 2018	Mellieħa (3)	0–5	Lija Athletic (2)	Ħamrun
16:15 CEST			Paolo Dandolo 3'; Koken Kuroki 8'; Andrea Azzopardi 42', 59'; Gabriel Borg 52'	Stadium: Victor Tedesco Stadium; Referee: Fyodor Zammit

2 December 2018	Gudja United (2)	1–2 (a.e.t.)	Xewkija Tigers (Gozo)	Ta' Qali
14:00 CEST	Siqueira Jackson Lima 28'		Milos Stojanovic 57'; Cadu Antonio Claudio Pavlidis 104' (pen.)	Stadium: Centenary Stadium; Referee: Glen Tonna

2 December 2018	Pembroke Athleta (2)	0–2	Żejtun Corinthians (2)	Ħamrun
16:15 CEST			Edson Cardona 21', 30'	Stadium: Victor Tedesco Stadium; Referee: Philipp Farrugia

2 December 2018	Sliema Wanderers (1)	2–0	St. Andrews (1)	Ta' Qali
14:00 CEST	Frank Temile 32'; Jefferson Mateus de Assis 48'			Stadium: Ta' Qali National Stadium; Referee: Darryl Agius

3 December 2018	Vittoriosa Stars (2)	0–3	Tarxien Rainbows (1)	Ta' Qali
18:00 CEST			Ricardinho Faria da Silva 17'; Andre' Scicluna 45'; Michele Paolucci 52' (pen.)	Stadium: Centenary Stadium; Referee: Emanuel Grech

3 December 2018	Senglea Athletic (1)	2–3 (a.e.t.)	Mosta (1)	Ta' Qali
20:15 CEST	Caseres Augusto Rene 7'; Braian Volpini 13'		Romeu Pericles Romao 22' (pen.); Rafael Morisco 39'; Juri Cisotti 114'	Stadium: Centenary Stadium; Referee: Mario Apap

== Fourth round ==
Eight fourth round matches were played on 26–27 January 2019. The draw for the third and fourth rounds was held 5 November 2018. In the Fourth Round there were 10 clubs from Maltese Premier League, 3 clubs from Maltese First Division, 2 clubs from Maltese Second Division and 1 club (Xewkija Tigers) from Gozo Football League left.

26 January 2019	Hibernians (1)	4–0	Fgura United (3)	Ta' Qali
14:00 CEST	Tiago Adan Fonseca 4', 78'; Taylon Nicolas Correa 33'; Dunston Vella 54'			Stadium: Centenary Stadium; Referee: Stefan Pace

26 January 2019	Pietà Hotspurs (1)	2–0	Żejtun Corinthians (2)	Paola
14:00 CEST	Christian Degabriele 55'; Paul Chimezie 75'			Stadium: Hibernians Stadium; Referee: Malcolm Spiteri

26 January 2019	Mosta (1)	2–1	Sliema Wanderers (1)	Paola
16:00 CEST	Kyle Frendo 21'; Claude Davy Angan 50'		Younes Marzouk 41'	Stadium: Hibernians Stadium; Referee: Alan Mario Sant

26 January 2019	Tarxien Rainbows (1)	5–0	Żebbuġ Rangers (2)	Ta' Qali
16:15 CEST	Arab Siraj 19'; Michele Paolucci 25', 59', 65'; Jens Wemmer 61'			Stadium: Centenary Stadium; Referee: Ismael Barbara

27 January 2019	Balzan (1)	6–1	Xewkija Tigers (Gozo)	Ta' Qali
14:00 CEST	Correa Duarte Ricardo 30', 58', 74'; Aleksandar Kosoric 35'; Andrija Majdevac 39'; Steve Pisani 66'		Daniel Bogdanović 16'	Stadium: Ta' Qali National Stadium; Referee: Fyodor Zammit

27 January 2019	Gżira United (1)	4–2	Melita (3)	Ta' Qali
14:00 CEST	Haruna Garba 13', 61', 76'; Andrew Cohen 59' (pen.)		Michael Cachia 29'; Andrew Spiteri 42'	Stadium: Centenary Stadium; Referee: Alex Johnson

27 January 2019	Birkirkara (1)	2–1	Ħamrun Spartans (1)	Ta' Qali
16:00 CEST	Jorge Pereira 47'; Marcelo Henrique 72' (pen.)		Eduardo Dos Santos 40' (o.g.)	Stadium: Ta' Qali National Stadium; Referee: Glenn Tonna

27 January 2019	Lija Athletic (2)	1–7	Valletta (1)	Ta' Qali
16:15 CEST	Erjon Beu 25'		Jonathan Caruana 10'; Mario Fontanella 17', 57'; Matteo Picciolo 18'; Bojan Kaljevic 50'; Miguel Alba 60', 71'	Stadium: Centenary Stadium; Referee: Mario Apap

== Quarter-finals ==
Four quarter-final matches were scheduled for 23 and 24 February 2019. The draw for the quarter-finals was held 29 January 2019. The eight clubs left were all from the Premier League. On 23 February 2019, four quarter-final matches were postponed amid safety concerns caused by the inclement weather, warnings of gale-force winds and hail-storm. The first FA Trophy quarter-final match between Pietà Hotspurs and Gżira United, at the Hibernians Stadium, was abandoned by referee Emanuel Grech in the 88th minute, and finished on 3 May 2019 at Ta' Qali National Stadium, 19:00, from the point of abandonment.

23 February 2019	Pietà Hotspurs (1)	1–2 (a.e.t.)	Gżira United (1)	Paola and Ta' Qali
14:00 CEST	Tony 50'		Andrew Cohen 29'; Garba 113'	Stadium: Hibernians Stadium and Ta' Qali National Stadium; Referee: Emanuel Grech

3 May 2019	Mosta (1)	1–2	Birkirkara (1)	Ta' Qali
20:00 CEST	Roach 52'		Mifsud 39'; Jnohope 73' (o.g.)	Stadium: Ta' Qali National Stadium; Referee: Philipp Farrugia

3 May 2019	Tarxien Rainbows (1)	0–2	Balzan (1)	Paola
19:00 CEST			Effiong 45+2'; Correa 63'	Stadium: Hibernians Stadium; Referee: Fyodor Zammit

8 May 2019	Hibernians (1)	2–3 (a.e.t.)	Valletta (1)	Ta' Qali
18:30 CEST	Sahanek 11'; Mbong 20'		Kaljević 74', 102'; Pulis 84'	Stadium: Ta' Qali National Stadium; Referee: Stefan Pace

== Semi-finals ==
Two semi-final matches were played on 11 and 12 May 2019 at National Stadium, Ta' Qali. The draw for the semi-finals was held on 3 May 2019.

11 May 2019	Balzan (1)	3–2	Birkirkara (1)	Ta' Qali
17:00 CEST	Sljivic 8'; Ljubomirac 54'; Effiong 80'		Mifsud 32', 40'	Stadium: Ta' Qali National Stadium; Attendance: 750; Referee: Fyodor Zammit

12 May 2019	Gżira United (1)	0–2	Valletta (1)	Ta' Qali
17:00 CEST			Muscat 78'; Gavrilă 90+2'	Stadium: Ta' Qali National Stadium; Referee: Alan Mario Sant

== Final ==
The final took place on 18 May 2019; Balzan reached their second FA Trophy final while Valletta reached their 24th final which they triumphed 14 times. The last time Balzan and Valletta met together in the FA Trophy was the previous season in the semi-finals when Valletta beat Balzan by 2–1.

18 May 2019	Balzan (1)	4–4 (a.e.t.) (5–4 p)	Valletta (1)	Ta' Qali
17:00 CEST	Effiong 8', 44', 95', 104'	Report	Enmy Peña 40', 72'; Fontanella 115' (pen.); Muscat 119'	Stadium: Ta' Qali National Stadium; Attendance: 4,024; Referee: Mario Apap

== Television rights ==
The following matches were broadcast live on TVM2 and on TSN (offered by GO):

Round	TVM2 and TSN	TSN
Third Round	Sliema Wanderers vs St. Andrews	Floriana vs Ħamrun Spartans
Fourth Round	Birkirkara vs Ħamrun Spartans	
Quarter-finals	Hibernians vs Valletta	
Semi-finals	Balzan vs Birkirkara Gżira United vs Valletta	
Final	Balzan vs Valletta	

== See also ==
- 2018–19 Maltese Premier League
