= 2019–20 Maltese FA Trophy =

Tournament details
- Country: Malta
- Dates: 6 September 2019 – 9 May 2020
- Teams: 67

Final positions
- Champions: abandoned, no champion

Tournament statistics
- Matches played: 63
- Goals scored: 234 (3.71 per match)
- All statistics correct as of 1 March 2020.

The 2019–20 Maltese FA Trophy was the 82nd edition of the football cup competition.

Balzan were the defending champions, but were eliminated in the quarter-finals by Pietà Hotspurs.

On 18 May 2020, the Malta FA Executive Committee decided to terminate the competition due to the COVID-19 pandemic.

== Format ==
The clubs in the Premier League, First Division, Second Division and Third Division together with those from the Gozo Football League are involved in the draws of the initial rounds. The 14 top-flight sides enter the fray in the third round. Matches which are level after regulation advanced to extra time and afterwards to penalties to determine a winner, when needed.

	Clubs entering in this round	Clubs advancing from previous round
Preliminary round (16 clubs)	9 clubs from Gozo Football League; 7 clubs from Maltese Third Division	N/A
First round (18 clubs)	5 clubs from Gozo Football League; 5 clubs from Maltese Third Division	8 winners from Preliminary round
Second round (36 clubs)	14 clubs from Maltese First Division; 14 clubs from Maltese Second Division	9 winners from First round
Third round (32 clubs)	14 clubs from Maltese Premier League	18 winners from Second round
Fourth round (16 clubs)	No other entries	16 winners from Third round
Quarter-finals (8 clubs)	No other entries	8 winners from Fourth round
Semi-finals (4 clubs)	No other entries	4 winners from Quarter-finals
Final (2 clubs)	No other entries	2 winners from Semi-finals

== Schedule ==
The draws were made on 6 August 2018 and were conducted by Dr. Angelo Chetcuti, the General Secretary of the Malta Football Association, and Rodney Pisani, the Deputy General Secretary of the Association who leads the Competitions Department.

Round	Date(s)	Draw date	Number of fixtures	Clubs
Preliminary round	7–9 September 2019	8 August 2018	8	67 → 59
First round	13–16 September 2019	8 August 2018	9	59 → 50
Second round	25–28 October 2019	8 August 2018	18	50 → 32
Third round	29 November - 1 December 2019	6 November 2019	16	32 → 16
Fourth round	24–26 January 2020	6 November 2019	8	16 → 8
Quarter-finals	29 February - 1 March 2020	31 January 2020	4	8 → 4
Semi-finals	TBD	TBD	2	4 → 2
Final	TBD	TBD	1	2 → 1

== Preliminary round ==
Eight preliminary round matches were played on 6 till 9 September 2019. The draw for the preliminary, first, and second rounds was held on 8 August 2019.

6 September 2019	Xagħra United (Gozo) (1)	2–0	St. Venera Lightnings (4)	Xewkija
18:00 CEST	Rafael Rennardy de Souza 49', 66'			Stadium: Gozo Stadium; Referee: Andrew James Sammut

6 September 2019	Victoria Hotspurs (Gozo) (1)	7–0	Mdina Knights (4)	Xewkija
20:15 CEST	Elton Alexandre da Silva 23', 48', 59', 61'; Emiliano Lattes 61', 87'; Dylan Bellotti 72'; Maciel Henrique 76'			Stadium: Gozo Stadium; Referee: Daniel Portelli

7 September 2019	Kirkop United (4)	2–3	Kerċem Ajax (Gozo) (1)	St. Paul's Bay
20:15 CEST	Ayrton Buhagiar 21', 58'		Borja Polo 4'; Sergio Martinez 30pen'; Ali Oularbi 35pen'	Stadium: Sirens Stadium; Referee: Emanuel Grech

7 September 2019	Ta' Xbiex (4)	1–2	Munxar Falcons (Gozo) (2)	St. Paul's Bay
18:00 CEST	Matthew Fenech 31'		Hinrichs Cleiton Jose 15'; Roberto Buttigieg 77og'	Stadium: Sirens Stadium; Referee: Mehmet Oral

7 September 2019	Siġġiewi (4)	0–0 (a.e.t.) (4–2 p)	Marsaskala (4)	Ħamrun
20:15 CEST				Stadium: Victor Tedesco Stadium; Referee: Jason Portelli

7 September 2019	Għaxaq (4)	4–1	Żebbuġ Rovers (Gozo)	Ħamrun
18:00 CEST	Jurgen Gerada 22 pen'; Dean Agius 45'; Uros Markovic 79'; Neil Brownrigg 83'		Philco Halleson Honorato 36 pen'	Stadium: Victor Tedesco Stadium; Referee: Kurt Saliba

9 September 2019	Victoria Wanderers (Gozo) (1)	2–3 (a.e.t.)	Għajnsielem (Gozo) (1)	Xewkija
18:00 CEST	Igor Misan 5', 13'		Michael Bezzina 24'; Igor Nedeljkovic 35 pen'; Arboleda Valencia Jhon 98'	Stadium: Gozo Stadium; Referee: Ismael Barbara

9 September 2019	St. Lawrence Spurs (Gozo) (2)	0–5	Xewkija Tigers (Gozo) (1)	Xewkija
20:15 CEST			Jackson Lima Siqueira 6'; Rodney Buttigieg 14', 40', 60'; Claudio Frances 45'	Stadium: Gozo Stadium; Referee: Sabri Goctu

== First round ==
Nine first round matches were played on 13 till 16 September 2019. The draw for the preliminary, first, and second rounds was held 8 August 2019.

13 September 2019	Nadur Youngsters (Gozo) (1)	4–0	Oratory Youths (Gozo) (2)	Xewkija
20:00 CEST	Johan Castano 48'; Predrag Djordjevic 71'; Brandon Said 74'; Marcelo Barbosa 90+1'			Stadium: Gozo Stadium; Referee: Aleksandar Jovanovic

13 September 2019	Kerċem Ajax (Gozo) (1)	5–0	Munxar Falcons (Gozo) (2)	Xewkija
18:00 CEST	Milos Perisic 13', 77'; Thomas Vella 63'; Borja Polo 70', 86'			Stadium: Gozo Stadium; Referee: Joseph Scerri

14 September 2019	Sannat Lions (Gozo) (2)	0–1	Għargħur (4)	Kerċem
18:00 CEST			Fernandes Moreira Allan 85 pen'	Stadium: Kerċem Ajax Stadium; Referee: Kurt Saliba

14 September 2019	Siġġiewi (4)	0–4	Victoria Hotspurs (Gozo) (1)	St. Paul's Bay
18:00 CEST			Henrique Maciel 39'; Emiliano Lattes 43', 45'; Elton Alexandre da Silva 84'	Stadium: Sirens Stadium; Referee: Slawomir Olucha

14 September 2019	Mtarfa (4)	0–2	Għaxaq (4)	St. Paul's Bay
20:15 CEST			Clint Vassallo 16'; Jurgen Gerada 82'	Stadium: Sirens Stadium; Referee: Mario Apap

14 September 2019	Qala Saints (Gozo) (2)	2–3	Dingli Swallows (4)	Kerċem
20:15 CEST	Owen Joseph Borg 79'; Frank Azzopardi 83 pen'		Gianluca Theuma 11'; Daniel Cilia 27'; Dylan Mercieca 83'	Stadium: Kerċem Ajax Stadium

15 September 2019	Għarb Rangers (Gozo)	0–2	Xewkija Tigers (Gozo) (1)	Xewkija
18:00 CEST			Cadu Antonio Claudio Pavlidis 80'; Johnny Camilleri 90+3'	Stadium: Gozo Stadium; Referee: Aleksandar Jovanovic

15 September 2019	Msida St. Joseph (4)	1–2	Attard (4)	Pembroke
18:00 CEST	Jamie Delia 70 og'		Christian Farrugiai 28'; Bledi Alla 45'	Stadium: Luxol Stadium; Referee: Andrew James Sammut

15 September 2019	Xagħra United (Gozo) (1)	3–1	Għajnsielem (Gozo) (1)	Xewkija
20:00 CEST	Rafael Rennardy de Souza 11'; Ost Rodrigo dos Santos 34'; Gonzalo Lago Ander 67'		Igor Nedeljkovic 37 pen'	Stadium: Gozo Stadium; Referee: Darryl Agius

== Second round ==
Eighteen second round matches were played on 25 and 28 October 2019. The draw for the preliminary, first, and second rounds was held 8 August 2019. All teams from Maltese First Division and Maltese Second Division entered in the Second round. In the Second Round there are 2 clubs from Maltese Third Division and 5 clubs from Gozo Football League First Division left.

25 October 2018	Qrendi (2)	0–5	Lija Athletic (2)	Ħamrun
20:15 CEST			Clayton Giordimaina 20'; Erjon Beu 24', 60', 71'; Harry Wood 30'	Stadium: Victor Tedesco Stadium; Referee: Ezekiel Barbara

25 October 2018	San Ġwann (3)	2–0	Marsa (3)	Ħamrun
18:00 CEST	Christian Gauci 25'; Zach Bowman 43'			Stadium: Victor Tedesco Stadium; Referee: Daniel Casha

26 October 2018	Żurrieq (3)	0–2	Melita (3)	Pembroke
15:00CEST			Michael Cachia 45 Pen'; Danny Claridge 68 Pen'	Stadium: Luxol Stadium; Referee: Joanna Vassallo

26 October 2018	Marsaxlokk (3)	1–3	St. Andrews (2)	Ħamrun
15:00 CEST	Alan Tabone 88 Pen'		Mattia Veselji 40', 72'; Malcolm Vidal Vella 86'	Stadium: Victor Tedesco Stadium; Referee: Massimo Axisa

26 October 2018	Rabat Ajax (3)	4–1	Għargħur (4)	St. Paul's Bay
15:00 CEST	Alejandro Jimenez 46'; Isaac Abela 51', 77'; Larens Vella 87'		Allan Fernandes Moreira 15 Pen'	Stadium: Sirens Stadium; Referee: Hristos Palikarov

26 October 2018	Mġarr United (3)	5–1	Għaxaq (4)	St. Paul's Bay
17:15 CEST	Lazar Doric 6'; Joseph Paul Zammit 13'; Gordon Saliba 74'; Jamie Lee Micallef 80'; Kenneth Aquilina 90+1'		Jurgen Gerada 54'	Stadium: Sirens Stadium; Referee: Jason Portelli

26 October 2018	Mellieħa (3)	1–4	Swieqi United (2)	Pembroke
17:15 CEST	David Fenech 83'		Bene Albuquerque de Souza 2'; Fernandes Felipe Nunes 60', 67'; Luke Taliana 81'	Stadium: Luxol Stadium; Referee: Aleksandar Jovanovic

26 October 2018	Pietà Hotspurs (2)	4–1	St. George's (2)	Ħamrun
17:15 CEST	James Scicluna 5', 85'; Sheldon Pisani 27'; Jeremy Delmar 75'		Takumi Hiruma 89'	Stadium: Victor Tedesco Stadium; Referee: Alex Johnson

27 October 2018	Kerċem Ajax (Gozo) (1)	2–1	Fgura United (2)	Kerċem
13:30 CEST	Ali Oularbi 25'; Elton Vella 89'		Carlos Valero 77'	Stadium: Kerċem Ajax Stadium; Referee: Slawomir Olucha

27 October 2018	Xagħra United (Gozo) (1)	0–3	Victoria Hotspurs (Gozo) (1)	Kerċem
15:45 CEST			Maciel Henrique 9'; Christian Mercieca 72'; Elton Alexandre da Silva 79'	Stadium: Kerċem Ajax Stadium; Referee: Mario Apap

27 October 2018	Żejtun Corinthians (2)	2–1	Naxxar Lions (2)	Ħamrun
17:15 CEST	Do Nascimento Santos Ribeiro 25'; Jurgen Suda 82 Pen'		Edson Farias 45'	Stadium: Victor Tedesco Stadium; Referee: Slobodan Petrovic

27 October 2018	Vittoriosa Stars (2)	0–3	Nadur Youngsters (Gozo) (1)	St. Paul's Bay
17:15 CEST			Lucas Barreto 10', 40'; Brandon Said 90'	Stadium: Sirens Stadium; Referee: Sandro Spiteri

27 October 2018	Birżebbuġa St. Peter's (3)	2–7	Xewkija Tigers (Gozo) (1)	St. Paul's Bay
15:00 CEST	Andrea Sant 60', 66 Pen'		Juninho Jose Carlos Nogueira 4'; Mario Joseph Vella 19'; Cadu Antonio Claudio Pavlidis 34', 58', 62'; Michael Camilleri 77', 86'	Stadium: Sirens Stadium; Referee: Kurt Saliba

27 October 2018	Attard (4)	0–1	Żabbar St. Patrick (3)	Pembroke
15:00 CEST			Carl Abela 86'	Stadium: Luxol Stadium; Referee: Andrew James Sammut

27 October 2018	Żebbuġ Rangers (2)	3–1	Kalkara (3)	Pembroke
17:15 CEST	Muda Fagbeja 2', 72'; Ryan Zammit 90+1'		Larson Mallia 38'	Stadium: Luxol Stadium; Referee: Andre Scriha

27 October 2018	Qormi (2)	1–0	Luqa St. Andrew's (3)	Ħamrun
15:00 CEST	Gusman Tensior 34'			Stadium: Victor Tedesco Stadium; Referee: Erjon Bastari (Albania)

28 October 2018	Dingli Swallows (4)	1–3	Mqabba (2)	Ta' Qali
18:00 CEST	Mark Vassallo 35'		Ion Margarit 1', 9', 18'	Stadium: Centenary Stadium; Referee: Sandro Spiteri

28 October 2018	Pembroke Athleta (2)	3–0	Xgħajra Tornadoes (3)	Ta' Qali
20:15 CEST	Jean Pierre Mifsud Triganza 42 Pen'; Luka Mijic 71'; Pedrinho Joao Oliveira Santos 90 Pen'			Stadium: Centenary Stadium; Referee: Fydor Zammit

== Third round ==
Sixteen third round matches were played on 29 November and 1 December 2019. The draw for the third and fourth rounds was held on 6 November 2019. All teams from Maltese Premier League entered in Third round. The top six position from 2018-19 Maltese Premier League teams that are seeded in the third round of the FA Trophy. A total of thirty-two clubs will be involved in the draw. In the Third Round there are 9 clubs from Maltese First Division, 5 clubs from Maltese Second Division and 4 clubs from Gozo Football League First Division left.

29 November 2019	Pembroke Athleta (2)	6–0	Żabbar St. Patrick (3)	Ħamrun
18:00 CEST	Jean Pierre Mifsud Triganza 9 Pen'; Luka Mijic 231', 36', 72'; Pedrinho Joao Oliveira Santos 39'; Darko Todorovski 87'			Stadium: Victor Tedesco Stadium; Referee: Massimo Axisa

29 November 2019	Qormi (2)	2–2 (a.e.t.) (4–5 p)	Swieqi United (2)	Ħamrun
20:15 CEST	Tensior Gusman 33'; Michael Borg 73'		Tejumola Ayorinde 11', 23'	Stadium: Victor Tedesco Stadium; Referee: Alex Johnson

30 November 2019	Balzan (1)	3–0	San Ġwann (3)	Ta' Qali
14:00 CEST	Michael Johnson 27'; Andrija Majdevac 45'; Alfred Effiong 58'			Stadium: Centenary Stadium; Referee: Daniel Portelli

30 November 2019	Tarxien Rainbows (1)	1–2	Ħamrun Spartans (1)	Paola
14:00 CEST	Petar Kanzurov 83'		Wilfried Domoraud 2', 26 pen'	Stadium: Hibernians Stadium; Referee: Fyodor Zammit

30 November 2019	Mqabba (2)	0–3	Pietà Hotspurs (2)	Ħamrun
14:00 CEST			Ze Lucas Caetano 36 Pen', 44 Pen'; James Scicluna 58'	Stadium: Victor Tedesco Stadium; Referee: Mario Apap

30 November 2019	Gżira United (1)	1–2	Senglea Athletic (1)	Paola
16:00 CEST	Zachary Scerri 56'		Jan Tanti 74'; Leighton Grech 84'	Stadium: Hibernians Stadium; Referee: Matthew De Gabrielle

30 November 2019	St. Andrews (2)	0–4	Valletta (1)	Ta' Qali
16:15 CEST			Jean Borg 18'; Douglas Packer 26'; Steve Borg 30', 36'	Stadium: Centenary Stadium; Referee: Andrea Scriha

30 November 2019	Gudja United (1)	3–0	Lija Athletic (2)	Ħamrun
16:15 CEST	Jake Aidan Friggieri 5'; Jimenez Miguel Antonio 53'; De Barros Anderson Francisco 72'			Stadium: Victor Tedesco Stadium; Referee: Slobodan Petrovic

1 December 2019	Żejtun Corinthians (2)	0–3	Hibernians (1)	Ta' Qali
14:00 CEST			Andrei Agius 54'; Terence Groothusen 56', 65'	Stadium: Ta' Qali National Stadium; Referee: Ismael Barbara

1 December 2019	Sliema Wanderers (1)	0–2	Santa Lucia (1)	Ta' Qali
14:00 CEST			Kevin Ante Rosero 55'; David Mendoza 90+5'	Stadium: Centenary Stadium; Referee: Philip Farrugia

1 December 2019	Kerċem Ajax (Gozo) (1)	1–4	Sirens (1)	Xewkija
13:00 CEST	Darko Krstic 80'		Bustos Manuel Angel 37', 53'; Ige Adesina 71'; Romarinho Lucas Menezes 76'	Stadium: Gozo Stadium; Referee: Darryl Agius

1 December 2019	Floriana (1)	6–1	Melita (3)	Ta' Qali
16:15 CEST	Caseres Augusto Rene 20', 34'; Tiago Adan Fonseca 39'; Venancio Diego da Silva 45 Pen'; Brandon Paiber 73'; Clyde Borg 75'		Jean Pierre Attard 48'	Stadium: Centenary Stadium; Referee: Malcolm Spiteri

1 December 2019	Rabat Ajax (3)	0–7	Mosta (1)	Ħamrun
16:15 CEST			Muchardi Roberto Matias 14'; Zachary Brincat 27', 49', 80', Dexter Xuereb 43'; Diouf Jean Barthelemy 55', 75',	Stadium: Victor Tedesco Stadium; Referee: Stefan Pace

1 December 2019	Birkirkara (1)	1–0	Nadur Youngsters (Gozo) (1)	Ta' Qali
CEST	Federico Falcone 89'			Stadium: Ta' Qali National Stadium; Referee: Alan Mario Sant

1 December 2019	Żebbuġ Rangers (2)	3–5	Victoria Hotspurs (Gozo) (1)	Ħamrun
14:00 CEST	Samuel Buhagiar 14'; Saturday Nanapere 55'; Muda Fagbeja 90+1'		Elton Alexandre da Silva 6 Pen', 40', 85'; Henrique Maciel 26'; Emiliano Lattes 90+2'	Stadium: Victor Tedesco Stadium; Referee: Ezekiel Barbara

1 December 2019	Xewkija Tigers (Gozo) (1)	5–2	Mġarr United (3)	Xewkija
15:00 CEST	Juninho Jose Carlos Nogueira 8'; Jackson Lima Siqueira 52'; Milos Stojanovic 78', 90+3'; Cadu Antonio Claudio Pavlidis 86'		Kenneth Aquilina 42'; Lyden Micallef 84'	Stadium: Gozo Stadium; Referee: Aleksandar Jovanovic

== Fourth round ==
Eight Fourth round matches were played on 24–26 January 2020. The draw for the third and fourth rounds was held on 6 November 2019. In the Fourth Round there are 11 clubs from Maltese Premier League, 3 clubs from Maltese First Division and 2 clubs from Gozo Football League First Division left.

24 January 2020	Mosta (1)	1–2	Birkirkara (1)	Ta' Qali
19:00 CEST	Zachary Brincat 61'		Caio Rocha 47', 52'	Stadium: Centenary Stadium; Referee: Darryl Agius

25 January 2020	Balzan (1)	2–0	Santa Lucia (1)	Paola
14:00 CEST	Andrija Majdevac 17 pen'; Ivan Bozovic 34'			Stadium: Hibernians Stadium; Referee: Glenn Tonna

25 January 2020	Pietà Hotspurs (2)	2–1	Xewkija Tigers (Gozo) (1)	Ta' Qali
14:00 CEST	Clyde Bouvet 36'; Caetano Ze Lucas 44 pen'		Cadu Antonio Claudio Pavlidis 60'	Stadium: Centenary Stadium; Referee: Daniel Portelli

25 January 2020	Floriana (1)	2–0 (a.e.t.)	Senglea Athletic (1)	Paola
16:00 CEST	Venancio Diego da Silva 117'; Brandon Paiber 120'			Stadium: Hibernians Stadium; Referee: Ishmael Barbara

25 January 2020	Pembroke Athleta (2)	0–4	Hibernians (1)	Ta' Qali
16:15 CEST			Dunston Vella 19'; Imanol Iriberri 30'; Ferdinando Apap 86'; Myles Beerman 88 pen'	Stadium: Centenary Stadium; Referee: Mario Apap

26 January 2020	Swieqi United (2)	1–3	Ħamrun Spartans (1)	Ta' Qali
14:00 CEST	Roderick Taliana 78'		Kark Micallef 16', 63'; Nicola Leone 90'	Stadium: Centenary Stadium; Referee: Slobodan Petrovic

26 January 2020	Victoria Hotspurs (Gozo) (1)	1–3	Gudja United (1)	Xewkija
15:00 CEST	Francesco Marra 51 pen'		Aidan Jake Friggieri 13'; David Edison Bilbao Zarate 65 pen'; Rundell Winchester 75'	Stadium: Gozo Stadium; Referee: Alex Johnson

26 January 2020	Valletta (1)	4–1	Sirens (1)	Ta' Qali
16:15 CEST	Bojan Kaljević 7', 80'; Matteo Piciollo 27'; Barrios Jhony Moises 90'		Sergio Raphael dos Anjos 89'	Stadium: Centenary Stadium; Referee: Emanuel Grech

== Quarter-finals ==
Four quarter-final matches were scheduled on 29 February and 1 March 2020. The draw for the quarter-finals will be held on 31 January 2020. In the Quarter-finals there are 7 clubs from Maltese Premier League and 1 club from Maltese First Division left.

29 February 2020	Balzan (1)	0–1	Pietà Hotspurs (2)	Paola
14:00 CEST			Caetano Ze Lucas 70'	Stadium: Hibernians Stadium; Referee: Fyodor Zammit

29 February 2020	Valletta (1)	2–0	Gudja United (1)	Paola
16:15 CEST	Bojan Kaljević 52', 58'			Stadium: Hibernians Stadium; Referee: Trustin Farrugia Cann

1 March 2020	Hibernians (1)	2–1 (a.e.t.)	Ħamrun Spartans (1)	Ta' Qali
14:00 CEST	Santos Silva Jorge 70'; Imanol Iriberri 105'		Valdo Alhinho Goncalves 6'	Stadium: Ta' Qali National Stadium; Attendance: 2010; Referee: Philip Farrugia

1 March 2020	Floriana (1)	1–1 (a.e.t.) (3–1 p)	Birkirkara (1)	Ta' Qali
16:55 CEST	Caseres Augusto Rene 74'		Claudio Bonnani 60'	Stadium: Ta' Qali National Stadium; Attendance: 2010; Referee: Glenn Tonna
Note: The match, originally scheduled for 16:15 local time, was delayed 40 minutes to prevent overlap with the match between Hibernians and Ħamrun Spartans, which had end the match by Extra Time.

== Semi-finals ==
Two semi-final matches was going to play in May 2020 at National Stadium, Ta' Qali. On 18 May 2020, the Malta FA Executive Committee decided to terminate the competition due to the COVID-19 pandemic.

== Television rights ==
The following matches were broadcast live on TVM2:

Round	TVM2	Stadium
Third Round	Birkirkara vs Nadur Youngsters	National Stadium, Ta' Qali
Fourth Round	Valletta vs Sirens	Centenary Stadium
Quarter-finals	Floriana vs Birkirkara	National Stadium, Ta' Qali

== See also ==
- 2019–20 Maltese Premier League
