= 2017–18 Maltese FA Trophy =

Tournament details
- Country: Malta
- Dates: 2 September 2017 – 5 May 2018
- Teams: 64

Final positions
- Champions: Valletta (14 Times)
- Runners-up: Birkirkara

Tournament statistics
- Matches played: 63
- Goals scored: 239 (3.79 per match)
- All statistics correct as of 5 May 2018.

The 2017–18 Maltese FA Trophy was the 80th version of the football tournament. It was sponsored by Boost Diesel, which was revealed during the draws of the first, second and third round of the Maltese FA Trophy at the Trophies Lounge in Malta Football Association headquarters in Ta' Qali. A total of sixty–four clubs participated in this season's cup competition.

Floriana were the defending champions, but were eliminated in the third round by Naxxar Lions in the third round on 2 December 2017. The winners of the trophy were Valletta who won their 14th title following a 2–1 win over Birkirkara in the final. Despite losing the final, Birkirkara earned a place in the first qualifying round of the 2018–19 UEFA Europa League, as Valletta had already qualified for the a European competition following their league triumph.

== Format ==
The Maltese FA Trophy this season was a single elimination tournament between 64 clubs. Matches which were level after regulation advanced to extra time and afterwards to penalties to determine a winner, when needed.

	Clubs entering in this round	Clubs advancing from previous round
Preliminary round (10 clubs)	6 clubs from Gozo Football League; 4 clubs from Maltese Third Division	N/A
First round (18 clubs)	5 clubs from Gozo Football League; 8 clubs from Maltese Third Division	5 winners from preliminary round
Second round (36 clubs)	14 clubs from Maltese First Division; 14 clubs from Maltese Second Division	9 winners from first round
Third round (32 clubs)	14 clubs from Maltese Premier League	18 winners from second round
Fourth round (16 clubs)	No other entries	16 winners from third round
Quarter-finals (8 clubs)	No other entries	8 winners from fourth round
Semi-finals (4 clubs)	No other entries	4 winners from quarter-finals
Final (2 clubs)	No other entries	2 winners from semi-finals

== Schedule ==
Round	Date(s)	Draw date	Number of fixtures	Clubs
Preliminary round	2–3 September 2017	7 August 2017	5	64 → 59
First round	8–11 September 2017	7 August 2017	9	59 → 50
Second round	21–22 October 2017	7 August 2017	18	50 → 32
Third round	1–3 December 2017	13 November 2017	16	32 → 16
Fourth round	19–21 January 2018	13 November 2017	8	16 → 8
Quarter-finals	17–18 February 2018	22 January 2018	4	8 → 4
Semi-finals	28–29 April 2018	23 April 2018	2	4 → 2
Final	5 May 2018	23 April 2018	1	2 → 1

== Preliminary round ==
Five preliminary round matches were played on 2–3 September 2017. The draw for the preliminary, first, and second rounds was held 7 August 2017.

2 September 2017	Nadur Youngsters (Gozo)	4–1	Xagħra United (Gozo)	Xewkija
18:00 CEST	Brandon Said 18', 49'; Stefan Cassar 23', 48'	Report	Johann Bajada 28'	Stadium: Gozo Stadium; Referee: Andre’ Naudi

3 September 2017	Mellieħa (4)	4–3	Munxar Falcons (Gozo)	Ta' Qali
20:15 CEST	Bryan Bautista 12', 43'; Jeffrey Gauci 77'; Roberto Sammut 80' (o.g.)	Report	Mattias Michael Uzor 14'; Jordi Parnis 16', 39'	Stadium: Centenary Stadium; Referee: Jude Amin Utulu

3 September 2017	Oratory Youths (Gozo)	4–0	Ghaxaq (4)	Xewkija
18:00 CEST	Bartomeu Perello Palou 17' (pen.), 29'; Ralph Ebube Okpokwu 48', 73'	Report		Stadium: Gozo Stadium; Referee: Daniel Portelli

3 September 2017	Xewkija Tigers (Gozo)	4–1	Marsaskala (4)	Xewkija
20:00 CEST	Thiago Melo dos Santos 9', 76'; Rodney Buttigieg 25'; Joseph George Vella 72' (pen.)	Report	Matthew Gauci 81'	Stadium: Gozo Stadium; Referee: Ezekiel Barbara

3 September 2017	Xghajra Tornadoes (4)	4–1	St. Lawrence Spurs (Gozo)	Ta' Qali
18:00 CEST	Emre Yener 31', 65', 66'; Royter Degiorgio 80'	Report	Denis di Maio 34'	Stadium: Centenary Stadium; Referee: Darko Stankovic

== First round ==
Nine first round matches were played on 9–20 September 2017. The draw for the preliminary, first, and second rounds was held 7 August 2017.

9 September 2017	Żurrieq (4)	3–1	Qala Saints (Gozo)	Mosta
18:00 CEST	Gilbert Camilleri 7'; Leontiev Konda 42'; Daniel Zammit 82'		Joseph Buttigieg 30'	Stadium: Charles Abela Memorial Stadium; Referee: Andrea Naudi

9 September 2017	Ta' Xbiex S.C. (4)	1–4	St. Venera Lightnings (4)	Mosta
20:15 CEST	Riccardo Napoli 38'		Luca Bugeja 27'; Eddie Wileman 75', 80', 90+4'	Stadium: Charles Abela Memorial Stadium; Referee: Keith Montebello

10 September 2017	Mdina Knights (4)	2–3	Mellieħa (4)	Ta' Qali
18:00 CEST	Samuel Bartolo 16'; Julian Vella 71' (o.g.)	Report	Kyle Simiana 14', 50'; Bryan Rene Bautista Navarro 66'	Stadium: Centenary Stadium; Referee: Kurt Saliba

10 September 2017	Victoria Hotspurs (Gozo)	1–0	Nadur Youngsters (Gozo)	Gozo
18:00 CEST	Elton da Silva 66'	Report		Stadium: Gozo Stadium; Referee: Ishmael Barbara

10 September 2017	Mtarfa (4)	1–3	Dingli Swallows (4)	Ta' Qali
20:15 CEST	Paul Azzopard 9'	Report	Peter Anoresco 26'; Karl Cilia 73'; Dylan Camenzuli 74'	Stadium: Centenary Stadium; Referee: Joseph Scerri

10 September 2017	Victoria Wanderers (Gozo)	1–4	Xewkija Tigers (Gozo)	Gozo
20:00 CEST	Nicolás Abot 84'	Report	Anthony Attard 17' (o.g.); Gennaro Hili 45'; Rodney Buttigieg 51'; Thiago Melo dos Santos 81'	Stadium: Gozo Stadium; Referee: Sandro Spiteri

11 September 2017	Xghajra Tornadoes (4)	2–1	Msida St. Joseph (4)	San Pawl il-Bahar
20:00 CEST	Gabriel Bonavia 45'; Ivan Cassar 75' (o.g.)	Report	Dylan Agius 31'	Stadium: Sirens Stadium; Referee: Shaun Calleja

11 September 2017	Oratory Youths (Gozo)	4–4 (a.e.t.) (3–4 p)	Kerċem Ajax (Gozo)	Gozo
19:00 CEST	Ralph Ebube Okpokwu 38'; Bartomeu Perello Palou 56'; Joshua Buttigieg 94', 120+1'	Report	Ognjen Rolovic 46' (pen.); Alen Haska 90+1'; Nathaniel Mercieca 117'; Jean Paul Mizzi 120'	Stadium: Gozo Stadium; Referee: Alex Johnson

20 September 2017	Għajnsielem (Gozo)	2–2 (a.e.t.) (8–7 p)	Kirkop United (4)	Ta' Qali
19:00 CEST	Alberto Xuereb 84'; Shaun Bajada 93'		Neil John Cutajar 22'; Michael Theuma 120+1' (pen.)	Stadium: Centenary Stadium; Referee: Shaun Calleja

== Second round ==
Eighteen second round matches were played on 21–22 October 2017. The draw for the preliminary, first, and second rounds was held 7 August 2017. All teams from Maltese First Division and Maltese Second Division entered in the Second round.

22 October 2017	Pembroke Athleta (2)	1–3 (a.e.t.)	Pietà Hotspurs (2)	Hamrun
17:15 CEST	Souza 23'		Clieve Gauci 88', 99', 119'	Stadium: Victor Tedesco Stadium

21 October 2017	Għargħur (3)	1–7	Vittoriosa Stars (2)	Pembroke
15:00 CEST	Charlot Zarb 49'		Joseph JoJo Ogunuppe 23'; Obinna Obiefule 35', 44'; Andre Farrugia 58', 90+3'; Cristian Suarez 63'; Armano Leilis 77'	Stadium: Luxol Stadium

21 October 2017	Marsaxlokk (3)	5–0	Żabbar St. Patrick (2)	Pembroke
17:15 CEST	Kenneth Ekezie 8'; Alan Tabone 11', 36', 90'; Cleaven Zammit 88'			Stadium: Luxol Stadium

22 October 2017	Żurrieq (4)	1–4	Qrendi (2)	Pembroke
15:00 CEST	Gilbert Camilleri 76'		Shunsuke Nakamura 27'; Dhonatan Santos Da Hora 36', 67'; Camelo Caruana 90' (o.g.)	Stadium: Luxol Stadium

22 October 2017	Gudja United (3)	3–0 (a.e.t.)	Rabat Ajax (2)	Mosta
15:00 CEST	Nicholas Zammit 95', 110'; Jean Claud Cesare 115'			Stadium: Charles Abela Memorial Stadium

21 October 2017	Sirens (2)	1–3	Żebbuġ Rangers (2)	Hamrun
17:15 CEST	Darko Medic 75' (pen.)		Clifford Gauci 10', 45'; Aleksander Kovacic 47'	Stadium: Victor Tedesco Stadium

22 October 2017	Xewkija Tigers (Gozo)	5–2	Xghajra Tornadoes (4)	Gozo
14:00 CEST	Joseph Gorg Vella 31' (pen.); Antonio Claudio Pavlidis Cadu 37', 77' (pen.); Thiago Melo Figueirido 58'; Milos Stojanovic 90'		Royter Degiorgio 40', 61' (pen.)	Stadium: Gozo Stadium

21 October 2017	Fgura United (3)	1–4	Qormi (2)	Hamrun
15:00 CEST	Thomas Grech 78'		Tensior Gusman 29'; Julien Salaroli 46'; Lubos Adamec 59'; Ze Lucas Caetano da Silva 83'	Stadium: Victor Tedesco Stadium

22 October 2017	Mġarr United (3)	0–3	Mqabba (2)	Mosta
17:15 CEST			Paul Chimezie 15', 89'; Tomislav Trebovac 47'	Stadium: Charles Abela Memorial Stadium

22 October 2017	Marsa (2)	0–4	Santa Lucia (3)	Hamrun
15:00 CEST			Solano Rodriguez Santiago 33', 63'; Perdomo Sebastian 69', 71'	Stadium: Victor Tedesco Stadium

21 October 2017	St. Venera Lightnings (4)	1–2	Kalkara (3)	San Pawl il-Bahar
17:15 CEST	Joel Winters 88'		Timmy Thomas 31'; Dylan Xuereb 77'	Stadium: Sirens Stadium

21 October 2017	Zejtun Corinthians (2)	5–0	Dingli Swallows (4)	Mosta
17:15 CEST	Luis Andre De Melo 6', 16'; Adrian Carabott 21'; Ryan Cauchi 23'; Saturday Nanapere 85'			Stadium: Charles Abela Memorial Stadium

21 October 2017	Mellieħa (4)	1–2	Swieqi United (3)	San Pawl il-Bahar
15:00 CEST	Bryan Bautista 85'		Roderick Taliana 15' (pen.); Mirco Vella 45'	Stadium: Sirens Stadium

22 October 2017	San Ġwann (2)	2–0	St. George's (3)	Pembroke
17:15 CEST	Mario Andres Artieta Suarez 33'; Joao Claudio Kiala 49'			Stadium: Luxol Stadium

22 October 2017	Victoria Hotspurs (Gozo)	4–0	Birżebbuġa (3)	Gozo
16:00 CEST	Elton Alexandre da Silva 11' (pen.); Henrique Maciel 84'; Chris Camilleri 89'; Andrea Debrincat 90'			Stadium: Gozo Stadium

22 October 2017	Attard (3)	0–2 (a.e.t.)	Kerċem Ajax (Gozo)	San Pawl il-Bahar
15:00 CEST			Ognjen Rolovic 107'; Alen Haska 110'	Stadium: Sirens Stadium

21 October 2017	Siggiewi (3)	4–2	Luqa St. Andrew's (3)	Mosta
15:00 CEST	Jake Vella 35'; Ian Montanaro 44'; Mauro Busutti 52', 75'		Alan Abdel Rahman 17'; Luke Zahra 56' (o.g.)	Stadium: Charles Abela Memorial Stadium

22 October 2017	Melita (2)	3–3 (a.e.t.) (4–2 p)	Għajnsielem (Gozo)	San Pawl il-Bahar
17:15 CEST	Toraino Singleton 12', 80'; Luke Micallef 120'		Everton Felipe da Silva 2'; Oscar Guerrero 66', 98' (pen.)	Stadium: Sirens Stadium

== Third round ==
Sixteen third round matches were played on 1–3 December 2017. The draw for the third and fourth rounds was held 13 November 2017. All teams from Maltese Premier League entered in the Third round.

2 December 2017	Balzan (1)	4–1	Gudja United (3)	Hamrun
16:15 CEST	Bojan Kaljevic 5'; Marko Platisa 22'; Lecao Alex Da Paixao 43', 59'		Chris Grech 57'	Stadium: Victor Tedesco Stadium; Referee: Emanuel Grech

2 December 2017	Santa Lucia (3)	0–5	Birkirkara (1)	Hamrun
14:00 CEST			Luke Montebello 23', 46', 60'; Jake Grech 31'; Gianluca Zammit 77'	Stadium: Victor Tedesco Stadium; Referee: Darryl Agius

2 December 2017	Valletta (1)	2–0	Senglea Athletic (1)	Ta' Qali
16:15 CEST	Saleh Raed Ibrahim 27'; Michael Mifsud 29'			Stadium: Centenary Stadium; Referee: Stefan Pace

2 December 2017	Naxxar (1)	3–1 (a.e.t.)	Floriana (1)	Paola
16:15 CEST	Scott Fenwick 4', 93'; Yuri De Jesus Messias 117'		Mario Fontanella 49' (pen.)	Stadium: Hibernians Stadium; Referee: Philip Farrugia

2 December 2017	Hibernians (1)	2–1	Victoria Hotspurs (Gozo)	Ta' Qali
14:00 CEST	Ferdinando Apap 4' (o.g.); Johann Bezzina 80'		Elton Alexandre da Silva 64'	Stadium: Centenary Stadium; Referee: Glenn Tonna

2 December 2017	Saint Andrews (1)	1–3	Sliema Wanderers (1)	Paola
14:00 CEST	Kevaun Atkinson 46'		Nicolae Milinceanu 49'; Frank Temile 80'; Jefferson De Assis 95'	Stadium: Hibernians Stadium; Referee: Fyodor Zammit

1 December 2017	Lija Athletic (1)	4–0	Kalkara (3)	Ta' Qali
18:00 CEST	Kooh Sohna Rafael 8', 43', 59'; Bello Osagie Abubakar 50' (pen.)			Stadium: Centenary Stadium; Referee: Alan Mario Sant

3 December 2017	Xewkija Tigers (Gozo)	4–0	Vittoriosa Stars (2)	Gozo
14:00 CEST	Rodney Buttigieg 62'; Cadu Antonio Claudio Pavlidis 81', 83'; Mario Joseph Vella 90'			Stadium: Kerċem Ajax Stadium; Referee: Matthew De Gabriele

1 December 2017	San Ġwann (2)	3–0	Melita (2)	Hamrun
20:15 CEST	Chavez Flores Daniel 54' (pen.), 84'; Jan Tanti 61'			Stadium: Victor Tedesco Stadium; Referee: Shaun Calleja

3 December 2017	Qrendi (2)	2–0	Qormi (2)	Hamrun
16:15 CEST	Dhonatan Santos Da Hora 15'; Petar Mrvic 60'			Stadium: Victor Tedesco Stadium; Referee: Sandro Spiteri

3 December 2017	Kerċem Ajax (Gozo)	5–1	Żebbuġ Rangers (2)	Gozo
16:15 CEST	Andrew Mizzi 42', 62'; Jean Paul Mizzi 44'; Ognjen Rolovic 45'; Komljenovic Aleksandar 71'		Gomes Rafael Da Silva 59'	Stadium: Kerċem Ajax Stadium; Referee: Darko Stankovic

3 December 2017	Marsaxlokk (3)	0–3	Zejtun Corinthians (2)	Ta' Qali
14:00 CEST			Luis Andre De Melo 2', 14', 17'	Stadium: Ta' Qali National Stadium; Referee: Malcolm Spiteri

1 December 2017	Siggiewi (3)	2–3 (a.e.t.)	Pietà Hotspurs (2)	Hamrun
18:00 CEST	Eman Ciappara 26'; Trayo Grozev 103'		Artiago Roa Juan Manuel 3'; Gabriel Mensah 100'; Jan Busuttil 105'	Stadium: Victor Tedesco Stadium; Referee: Paul Toledo

1 December 2017	Mosta (1)	2–1	Mqabba (2)	Ta' Qali
20:15 CEST	Bilbao Zarate Edison David 17'; Tyrone Farrugia 66'		Michael Borg 42'	Stadium: Centenary Stadium; Referee: Ishmael Barbara

3 December 2017	Gżira United (1)	0–1 (a.e.t.)	Ħamrun Spartans (1)	Ta' Qali
16:15 CEST			Tiago Indigo Souza de Silveira 100'	Stadium: Ta' Qali National Stadium; Referee: Trustin Cann Farrugia

3 December 2017	Swieqi United (3)	0–3	Tarxien Rainbows (1)	Hamrun
14:00 CEST			Dieye 38', 60'; Matthew Brincat 55'	Stadium: Victor Tedesco Stadium; Referee: Jude Amin Utulu

== Fourth round ==
Eight fourth round matches were played on 19–21 January 2018. The draw for the third and fourth rounds was held 13 November 2017. In the Fourth Round there were 10 clubs from Maltese Premier League left, 4 clubs from Maltese First Division left and 2 clubs from Gozo Football League left.

19 January 2018	Birkirkara (1)	2–1 (a.e.t.)	San Ġwann (2)	Ta' Qali
19:00 CEST	Fernando Barbosa Pereira 72'; Carlos Alberto da Silva 104'		Godwin Henshaw 12'	Stadium: Centenary Stadium; Attendance: 346; Referee: Jude Amin Utulu

20 January 2018	Tarxien Rainbows (1)	1–2	Lija Athletic (1)	Ta' Qali
14:00 CEST	Ricardinho Faria da Silva 27' (pen.)		Ousmane Sidibe 51'; Erjon Beu 60'	Stadium: Centenary Stadium; Referee: Stefan Pace

20 January 2018	Kerċem Ajax (Gozo)	3–4 (a.e.t.)	Qrendi (2)	Gozo
15:30 CEST	Ognjen Rolovic 29', 51'; Alan Haska 84'		Julio Cesar Martins Da Silva 58', 74'; Dhonatan Santos Da Hora 64' (pen.); Aaron Agius 112'	Stadium: Kerċem Ajax Stadium; Referee: Daniel Portelli

21 January 2018	Hibernians (1)	3–0	Xewkija Tigers (Gozo)	Ta' Qali
14:00 CEST	Joao Moreira Vitor Rocha 17'; Jurgen Degabriele 20', 69'			Stadium: Ta' Qali National Stadium; Referee: Darryl Agius

20 January 2018	Balzan (1)	2–0	Naxxar (1)	Ta' Qali
16:15 CEST	Lecao Alex Da Paixao 82', 90+3'			Stadium: Centenary Stadium; Referee: Matthew De Gabriele

21 January 2018	Pietà Hotspurs (2)	0–1	Valletta (1)	Ta' Qali
16:15 CEST			Ryan Camilleri 2'	Stadium: Ta' Qali National Stadium; Referee: Emanuel Grech

20 January 2018	Ħamrun Spartans (1)	0–1	Sliema Wanderers (1)	Paola
16:00 CEST			Goran Adamovic 40'	Stadium: Hibernians Stadium; Referee: Trustin Cann Farrugia

20 January 2018	Mosta (1)	1–2	Zejtun Corinthians (2)	Paola
14:00 CEST	Leozinho Henrique Ferreira 89'		Adam Smeir 37'; Johan Castano 90+1'	Stadium: Hibernians Stadium; Referee: Ishmael Barbara

== Quarter-finals ==
Four quarter-final matches were played on 17 February 2018. The draw for the Quarter-finals was held 22 January 2018. The round included the two teams from Maltese First Division that were still in the competition: Qrendi and Zejtun Corinthians.

17 February 2018	Qrendi (2)	0–3	Birkirkara (1)	Paola
14:00 CEST			Cain Attard 44'; Nikola Vukanac 56'; Edward Herrera 86'	Stadium: Hibernians Stadium; Referee: Emanuel Grech

17 February 2018	Lija Athletic (1)	1–3	Balzan (1)	Paola
16:15 CEST	Aaron Sammut 45'		Lecao Alex Da Paixao 11'; Ljubomirac Uros 14'; Kadu Carlos Eduardo Mendes 83'	Stadium: Hibernians Stadium; Referee: (Albania) Indrit Myrtja

17 February 2018	Valletta (1)	2–0	Zejtun Corinthians (2)	Ta' Qali
14:00 CEST	Kyrian Nwoko 26'; Steve Borg 70'			Stadium: Ta' Qali National Stadium; Referee: Philip Farrugia

17 February 2018	Hibernians (1)	0–0 (a.e.t.) (1–4 p)	Sliema Wanderers (1)	Ta' Qali
16:15 CEST				Stadium: Ta' Qali National Stadium; Referee: Matthew De Gabrielle

== Semi-finals ==
Two semi-final matches were played on 28 and 29 April 2018 at National Stadium, Ta' Qali. The draw for the Semi-finals was held on 23 April 2018. The four clubs left were all from Maltese Premier League. Balzan were the only club remaining in the competition that had never won the Maltese FA Trophy in the past. Both Semi-final matches were Live on TVM2

28 April 2018	Birkirkara (1)	1–1 (a.e.t.) (3–2 p)	Sliema Wanderers (1)	Ta' Qali
16:00 CEST	Ognjen Rolovic 49'		Frank Temile 61'	Stadium: Ta' Qali National Stadium; Referee: Malcolm Spiteri

29 April 2018	Valletta (1)	2–1	Balzan (1)	Ta' Qali
16:00 CEST	Denni Rocha dos Santos 80' (pen.); Matteo Picciolo 82'		Lecao Alex Da Paixao 67'	Stadium: Ta' Qali National Stadium; Referee: Clayton Pisani

== Final ==
The final was played on 5 May 2018.

Birkirkara reached their tenth Maltese FA Trophy final having won it five times. Valletta reached their twenty-third final and had won it thirteen times previously.

Birkirkara and Valletta have met together in Maltese FA Trophy final twice before, having previously met in 1999 and 2001. When meeting in the finals, Valletta have both times.

The last time Birkirkara and Valletta met together in Maltese FA Trophy was during the 2015-16 fourth round when Birkirkara beat Valletta by 1–0.

5 May 2018	Birkirkara (1)	1–2	Valletta (1)	Ta' Qali
17:00 CEST	Ognjen Rolovic 87'		Kyrian Nwoko 41'; Santiago Malano 78'	Stadium: Ta' Qali National Stadium; Attendance: 7,011; Referee: Alan Mario Sant; Assistant referees: Duncan Sultana & Thomas Debono; Malcolm Spiteri & Matthew Degabriele; Fourth official: William Debattista

== Television rights ==
The following matches were broadcast live on TVM2:

Round	TVM2	Stadium
Third Round	Gżira United vs Ħamrun Spartans	National Stadium, Ta' Qali
Fourth Round	Hibernians vs Xewkija Tigers	National Stadium, Ta' Qali
Quarter-finals	Valletta vs Zejtun Corinthians	National Stadium, Ta' Qali
Semi-finals	Birkirkara vs Sliema Wanderers Valletta vs Balzan	National Stadium, Ta' Qali
Final	Birkirkara vs Valletta	National Stadium, Ta' Qali

== See also ==
- 2017–18 Maltese Premier League
