= 2017–18 Gozo First Division =

Gozo Football League First Division
- Season: 2017–18
- Dates: 15 September 2017 – 5 May 2018
- Champions: Victoria Hotspurs (12th title)
- Relegated: Oratory Youths
- Matches played: 84
- Goals scored: 320 (3.81 per match)
- Top goalscorer: Elton da Silva (19 goals)
- All statistics correct as of 12 May 2018.

The 2017–18 Gozo First Division (known as the BOV GFA First Division for sponsorship reasons) was the 71st season of the Gozo Football League First Division, the highest division in Gozitan football. The season began on 15 September 2017.

Following a dominant campaign, Victoria Hotspurs ended the season as champions, winning their twelfth title in their history.

== Format ==
The season is composed of a round-robin system where each team plays each other three times, totalling 21 games in total. The seventh-placed team will play a relegation play-off with the second-placed team in the Second Division. Most of the matches are scheduled to be played at the Gozo Stadium, with Sannat Ground and Kerċem Ajax Stadium being used as well.

== Teams ==
Locations of the 2017–18 GFA First Division teams

Xagħra United are relegated after they finished last the previous season. They are replaced by Għarb Rangers, who won the 2016–17 Second Division title.

Team	Home city	2016–17 season
Għajnsielem	Għajnsielem	3rd
Għarb Rangers	Għarb	1st (Second Division)
Kerċem Ajax	Kerċem	4th
Nadur Youngsters	Nadur	2nd
Oratory Youths	Victoria	6th
S.K. Victoria Wanderers	Victoria	7th
Victoria Hotspurs	Victoria	5th
Xewkija Tigers	Xewkija	1st

== League table ==
Pos	Team	Pld	W	D	L	GF	GA	GD	Pts	Qualification or relegation
1	Victoria Hotspurs (C)	21	19	1	1	63	15	+48	58	
2	Nadur Youngsters	21	13	1	7	55	39	+16	40	
3	Xewkija Tigers	21	10	2	9	45	37	+8	32	
4	Għajnsielem	21	7	6	8	30	41	−11	27	
5	Kerċem Ajax	21	7	5	9	34	50	−16	26	
6	Għarb Rangers	21	6	4	11	28	41	−13	22	
7	S.K. Victoria Wanderers	21	5	4	12	35	47	−12	19	Qualification for the relegation play-off
8	Oratory Youths (R)	21	3	5	13	28	48	−20	14	Relegation to the Gozo FA Second Division

Source: RSSSF
Rules for classification: 1) Points; 2) Play-off (only if deciding champion and UEFA competition places); 3) Head-to-head points; 4) Head-to-head goal difference; 5) Head-to-head goals scored; 6) Goal difference; 7) Goals scored.
(C) Champions; (R) Relegated

== Results ==
=== Matches 1–14 ===
Teams play each other twice, once assigned as home and once away.

Home \ Away	GĦJ	GĦB	KRĊ	NDR	ORY	SKVW	VCH	XWK
Għajnsielem	—	1–2	0–2	1–4	2–2	2–1	0–6	0–3
Għarb Rangers	0–1	—	1–1	0–4	2–1	1–4	0–1	1–0
Kerċem Ajax	3–3	5–4	—	0–4	1–0	3–2	1–3	2–4
Nadur Youngsters	1–0	3–2	3–1	—	2–1	5–0	1–3	2–5
Oratory Youths	1–1	0–0	1–2	1–2	—	4–3	1–4	0–1
S.K. Victoria Wanderers	0–0	0–2	1–3	5–2	2–2	—	1–4	2–4
Victoria Hotspurs	3–3	2–1	5–0	2–0	2–0	2–0	—	2–1
Xewkija Tigers	0–2	3–0	3–2	1–2	5–0	3–2	0–1	—

Source: RSSSF
Legend: Blue = home team win; Yellow = draw; Red = away team win.

=== Matches 15–22 ===
Teams play every other team once (either assigned at home or away).

Home \ Away	GĦJ	GĦB	KRĊ	NDR	ORY	SKVW	VCH	XWK
Għajnsielem	—	—	2–0	1–4	3–1	—	—	1–1
Għarb Rangers	1–3	—	—	—	—	—	2–1	5–3
Kerċem Ajax	—	0–0	—	—	1–1	—	0–5	—
Nadur Youngsters	—	3–3	—	—	—	0–1	—	2–3
Oratory Youths	—	4–1	—	3–5	—	—	—	—
S.K. Victoria Wanderers	2–3	1–0	2–2	5–2	4–0	—	—	—
Victoria Hotspurs	4–1	—	—	3–1	3–0	4–1	—	—
Xewkija Tigers	—	—	1–2	—	2–5	1–1	1–3	—

Source: RSSSF
Legend: Blue = home team win; Yellow = draw; Red = away team win.

== Relegation play-off ==
A play-off match took place between the seventh-placed team from the First Division, S.K. Victoria Wanderers, and the second-placed team from the Second Division, Sannat Lions, for a place in the 2018–19 GFA First Division.

5 May 2018	S.K. Victoria Wanderers (1)	2–0	Sannat Lions (2)	Xewkija
	A. G. Attard 37'; N. Vella 45+2'			Stadium: Gozo Stadium; Referee: Trustin Farrugia Cann

== Season statistics ==
=== Top goalscorers ===
As of 29 April 2018

Rank	Player	Club	Goals
1	(Brazil) Elton da Silva	Victoria Hotspurs	19
2	(Serbia) Darko Krstic	Nadur Youngsters	15
2	(Brazil) Claudio Antunes Pavlidis	Xewkija Tigers	15
4	(Nigeria) Ralph Ebube Okpokwu	Oratory Youths	12
5	(Montenegro) Ognjen Rolović	Kerċem Ajax	11
5	(Serbia) Stanimir Milošković	Nadur Youngsters	11
5	(Brazil) Marcelo Barbosa	Għarb Rangers	11
8	(Brazil) Luis André de Melo Lima	Għajnsielem	10
8	(Nigeria) Ige Adeshina	S.K. Victoria Wanderers	10

== Awards ==
=== Monthly awards ===
Month	Player of the Month	
Month	Player	Club
September	(Malta) Rodney Buttigieg	Xewkija Tigers
October	(Malta) Ferdinando Apap	Victoria Hotspurs
November	(Malta) Shaun Attard	Nadur Youngsters
December	(Malta) Joseph Mario Vella	Xewkija Tigers
January	(Malta) Christian Mercieca	Victoria Hotspurs
February	(Malta) Alberto Xuereb	Għajnsielem
March	(Brazil) Marcelo Barbosa	Għarb Rangers
