= 2020–21 Maltese FA Trophy =

Tournament details
- Country: Malta

The 2020–21 Maltese FA Trophy was the 83rd edition of the football cup competition. The cup began on 15 December 2020. The winners of the Maltese FA Trophy this season would have earned a place in the first qualifying round of the 2021–22 UEFA Europa Conference League.

There was no winner of the previous cup because the Malta FA Executive Committee cancelled the competition due to the COVID-19 pandemic in Malta.

On 9 April, the cup was abandoned due to the COVID-19 pandemic in Malta.

== Preliminary round ==
Twelve preliminary round matches were played on 15–27 December 2020. The draw for the preliminary round was held on 10 December 2020.

15 December 2020	St. George's	1–3	Pembroke Athleta	Ħamrun
20:45	Aaron Hili 53'		Ekeh Kelechi Cosmos 37' (og.); Boham David Habiganuchi 74'; Abdeen Temitope Abdul 88'	Stadium: Victor Tedesco Stadium; Referee: Andrea Scriha

16 December 2020	Mqabba	5–3 (a.e.t.)	San Ġwann	Ta' Qali
17:30	Johan Alberto Castano 80', 90+4', 118'; Gabriel Nazareno Mannino 82'; Ryan Spiteri 110'		Nezar Fawzi Abouhaisa 47'; Adam Falzon 52'; Clifford Gauci 85'	Stadium: Centenary Stadium; Referee: Matthew De Gabrielle

17 December 2020	St. Andrews	1–0	Żurrieq	Ta' Qali
17:30	Sebastian Cassar Torregiani 15'			Stadium: Centenary Stadium; Referee: Malcolm Spiteri

17 December 2020	Naxxar Lions	2–0	Qrendi	Ta' Qali
20:45	Farid Romero Zuniga 50'; Erikys da Silva Ferreira 90+3'			Stadium: Centenary Stadium; Referee: Slawomir Olucha

22 December 2020	Nadur Youngsters (Gozo)	3–1	Msida St. Joseph	Kerċem
19:00	Andrea Debrincat 33', 62'; Chris Camilleri 73'		Ciro Quaranta 68'	Stadium: Kerċem Ajax Stadium; Referee: Sandro Spiteri

23 December 2020	Għajnsielem (Gozo)	3–1	Pietà Hotspurs	Xewkija
19:00	Igor Nedeljkovic 19'; Alberto Xuereb 23'; Jhon Arboleda Valencia 45+3' (pen.)		Gabriel Borg 71'	Stadium: Gozo Stadium; Referee: Glenn Tonna

23 December 2020	Xewkija Tigers (Gozo)	0–3	Fgura United	Kerċem
19:30			Sergio Hili 42'; Noah Olawole Ojuola 63'; Gilbert Martin 82'	Stadium: Kerċem Ajax Stadium; Referee: Stefan Pace

23 December 2020	Birżebbuġa St. Peter's	2–1 (a.e.t.)	Siġġiewi	Ta' Qali
20:30	Vinicius de Souza Ferreira 41'; Shawn Vella 102'		Kurt Magro 51'	Stadium: Centenary Stadium; Referee: Sandro Spiteri

27 December 2020	Kerċem Ajax (Gozo)	0–3	Marsa	Kerċem
13:00			Patrick Jean Teixeira Maia 7'; Rodrigo Coelho Confettura 69'; Paulo Santos de Azevedo 90+1'	Stadium: Kerċem Ajax Stadium; Referee: Emanuel Grech

27 December 2020	Victoria Hotspurs (Gozo)	1–0	Vittoriosa Stars	Xewkija
14:00	Christian Mercieca 64'			Stadium: Gozo Stadium; Referee: Shaun Calleja

27 December 2020	Marsaxlokk	3–0	Victoria Wanderers (Gozo)	Ħamrun
14:00	Ivan Edgardo Paz 11', 75'; Jean Pierre Mifsud Triganza 12'			Stadium: Victor Tedesco Stadium; Referee: Darryl Agius

27 December 2020	Oratory Youths (Gozo)	1–8	Żebbuġ Rangers	Kerċem
17:15	Daniel Azzopardi 33'		Shaun Bugeja 29'; Luka Mijic 35'; Ayrton Mizzi 46'; Stanimir Miloskovic 54'; Jonatan Silveira da Silva 62'; Randall Vella 69', 71'; Clive Gauci 76'	Stadium: Kerċem Ajax Stadium; Referee: Andrea Scriha

== First round ==
Sixteen first round matches were played on 2–24 February 2021. The draw for the first round was held on 14 January 2021.

2 February 2021	Sirens	5–0	Fgura United	Ta' Qali
20:30	Samba Tounkara 12'; Thiago Espindola 16'; Terence Agius 39'; Wilfried Domoraud 76' (pen.), 84'			Stadium: Centenary Stadium; Referee: Darryl Agius

3 February 2021	Nadur Youngsters (Gozo)	2–3	Senglea Athletic	Xewkija
18:00	Marcelo Barbosa Junior 35' (pen.); Ian Xuereb 39'		Junior Dibola Diwoto 16' (pen.), 49', 63'	Stadium: Gozo Stadium

3 February 2021	Pembroke Athleta	4–2	Marsaxlokk	Ħamrun
20:30	Joseph JoJo Ogunuppe 11'; Joao Pedro Oliveira Santos 21', 57'; Abdeen Temitope Abdul 66'		Ryan Sammut 2'; Pablo Cesar Doffo 61' (pen.)	Stadium: Victor Tedesco Stadium; Referee: Aleksandar Jovanovic

4 February 2021	Għajnsielem (Gozo)	2–0	Victoria Hotspurs (Gozo)	Xewkija
19:00	Joseph George Vella 56'; Rodney Buttigieg 63'			Stadium: Gozo Stadium

9 February 2021	Birkirkara	6–0	Lija Athletic	Ta' Qali
20:30				Stadium: Centenary Stadium

10 February 2021	Floriana	1–3	Santa Lucia	Paola
14:00				Stadium: Hibernians Stadium

10 February 2021	Valletta	2–1	Gudja United	Ta' Qali
14:00				Stadium: Ta' Qali National Stadium

10 February 2021	Żebbuġ Rangers	0–1	Marsa	Ħamrun
14:00				Stadium: Victor Tedesco Stadium

10 February 2021	Qormi	0–3	Tarxien Rainbows	Ta' Qali
14:00				Stadium: Centenary Stadium

10 February 2021	Sannat Lions (Gozo)	1–3	Ħamrun Spartans	Xewkija
15:00				Stadium: Gozo Stadium

10 February 2021	Birżebbuġa St. Peter's	1–4	Xagħra United (Gozo)	St. Paul's Bay
15:00				Stadium: Sirens Stadium

10 February 2021	Balzan	1–3	Mosta	Paola
18:00				Stadium: Hibernians Stadium

10 February 2021	St. Andrews	1–0	Sliema Wanderers	Ta' Qali
18:00				Stadium: Centenary Stadium

10 February 2021	Naxxar Lions	6–1	Swieqi United	Ħamrun
18:00				Stadium: Victor Tedesco Stadium

11 February 2021	Gżira United	8–0	Mqabba	Ta' Qali
20:30				Stadium: Centenary Stadium

24 February 2021	Hibernians	3–0	Żejtun Corinthians	Ta' Qali
19:30				Stadium: Ta' Qali National Stadium

== Second round ==
Eight second round matches were played on 2–4 March 2021. The draw for the second round was held on 18 February 2021.

2 March 2021	Gżira United	4–2 (a.e.t.)	Tarxien Rainbows	Ta' Qali
17:00	Bahrudin Atajic 71'; Nikolai Muscat 86'; Ricardo Correa Duarte 96'; Maxuell Maia da Silva 99'		Raphael Kooh Sohna 2'; Vito Plut 45+1'	Stadium: Centenary Stadium; Referee: Trustin Farrugia Cann

2 March 2021	Għajnsielem (Gozo)	1–4	Birkirkara	Xewkija
18:30	Igor Nedeljkovic 54'		Kurt Zammit 27'; Enrico Pepe 37'; Paul Mbong 40'; Caio Henrique Prado Rocha 87'	Stadium: Gozo Stadium; Referee: Fydor Zammit

2 March 2021	Naxxar Lions	0–0 (a.e.t.) (2–4 p)	St. Andrews	Ħamrun
20:30				Stadium: Victor Tedesco Stadium; Referee: Slobodan Petrovic

3 March 2021	Pembroke Athleta	0–1	Hibernians	Ta' Qali
17:00			Gilmar da Silva Ribeiro 90+' (pen.)	Stadium: Centenary Stadium; Referee: Glen Tonna

3 March 2021	Santa Lucia	0–2	Mosta	Ta' Qali
18:30			Christ Evo Ememe 54'; Matias Muchardi 90+3'	Stadium: Ta' Qali National Stadium; Referee: Philip Farrugia

3 March 2021	Xagħra United (Gozo)	0–6	Ħamrun Spartans	Xewkija
18:30			Franklin Olanitori Sasere 18', 37'; Ige Abdullahi Adeshina 34', 85'; Blas Andreas Cittadini 53', 79'	Stadium: Gozo Stadium; Referee: Andrea Scriha

3 March 2021	Senglea Athletic	0–1	Valletta	Paola
18:30			Mario Fontanella 33'	Stadium: Hibernians Stadium; Referee: Daniel Doors

4 March 2021	Marsa	0–1	Sirens	Ta' Qali
20:30			Hamed Kone 58'	Stadium: Centenary Stadium; Referee: Stefan Pace

== See also ==
- 2020–21 Maltese Premier League
