= Second Division Challenge Cup =

Football competition in Malta

The Second Division Challenge Cup is a football competition that takes place in Gozo, organised by the Gozo Football Association.

The cup holders are Victoria Hotspurs which won the cup after beating Sannat Lions 3-1 after extra time in the final held on 19 March 2024.

This competition was once contested by the winners of the Gozo Football League Second Division and the winners or runners-up of the Second Division Knock-Out. The first Second Division Challenge Cup took place in the season 2006-2007.

In the 2020s, the 6 teams of GFL Second Division play a single-leg round-robin at the beginning of the season and then the first two teams of the table play the final in Spring.

== Cup Winners ==
Here is a complete list of the past champions of the Second Division Challenge Cup.

- 2023-2024 Victoria Hotspurs
- 2022-2023 SK Victoria Wanderers
- 2007-2008 SK Victoria Wanderers
- 2006-2007 SK Victoria Wanderers

| Club | Times |
|---|---|
| SK Victoria Wanderers | 3 |
| Victoria Hotspurs | 1 |
