= Đorović =

Đorović (Serbian Cyrillic: Ђopoвић; also transliterated Djorović) is a Serbian surname. Notable people with the surname include:

- Goran Đorović (born 1971), Serbian football manager and former player
- Predrag Đorović (born 1983), Serbian footballer
