= Predrag Đorović =

Serbian footballer

Personal information
- Full name: Predrag Đorović
- Date of birth: 3 June 1983 (age 43)
- Place of birth: Kosovska Mitrovica, SFR Yugoslavia
- Height: 1.70 m (5 ft 7 in)
- Position: Midfielder

Senior career*
Years	Team	Apps	(Gls)
2001–2003	Bane	44	(1)
2004–2008	Javor Ivanjica	76	(2)
2008	→ Novi Pazar (loan)	8	(1)
2009	Metalac Gornji Milanovac	8	(2)
2009–2012	Šumadija Jagnjilo	58	(17)
2010	→ Zemun (loan)	13	(0)
2012	Ægir	17	(5)
2012	Šumadija Jagnjilo	3	(0)
2013	Radnički Nova Pazova	9	(0)
2013	Cement Beočin		
2014	Radnički Valjevo		
2014-2015	Zvižd		
2015	Victoria Hotspurs		
2017–2022	Għarb Rangers		
- * Club domestic league appearances and goals as of 1 July 2024

Predrag Đorović (Serbian Cyrillic: Предраг Ђоровић; born 3 June 1983) is a Serbian retired football midfielder who last played for Għarb Rangers in Gozo Football League Second Division.
