= Tobi Jnohope =

Dominican footballer

Personal information
- Full name: Tobi "Bob" Jnohope
- Date of birth: 4 October 1997 (age 29)
- Place of birth: Largo, Florida, United States
- Height: 1.83 m (6 ft 0 in)
- Position: Defender

Youth career
- 2005–2015: Clearwater Chargers
- 2015–2016: Seattle Sounders

College career
| Years | Team | Apps | (Gls) |
| 2016 | Denver Pioneers | 0 | (0) |

Senior career*
| Years | Team | Apps | (Gls) |
| 2016 | Seattle Sounders 2 | 5 | (0) |
| 2019 | Mosta | 3 | (0) |
| 2020–2021 | Palmese 1912 | 0 | (0) |
| 2021–2023 | Lernayin Artsakh | 55 | (3) |
| 2024 | St. Petersburg Aztecs | 6 | (1) |
| 2024 | St. Petersburg FC | 2 | (0) |
| 2024–2025 | Chattanooga Red Wolves | 18 | (1) |

International career^{‡}
| 2019 | Dominica U23 | 2 | (1) |
| 2026– | Dominica | 5 | (0) |
- * Club domestic league appearances and goals as of 13:12, 1 November 2025 (UTC) ‡ National team caps and goals as of 4 October 2026

Tobi "Bob" Jnohope (born 4 October 1997) is a professional footballer who plays as a defender. Born in the United States, he represents Dominica internationally.

== Youth and college ==
Jnohope began his youth career with Clearwater Chargers Soccer Club in Florida where he played for 10 years before joining the Sounders FC Academy in 2015. On 3 February 2016, it was announced that Jnohope signed a letter of intent to play college soccer at the University of Denver. After being redshirted as a freshman, he was expected by some media outlets to play a greater role for the upcoming year. However, he was off the roster by the start of the 2017 season.

== Club career ==
On 25 March 2016, Jnohope made his professional debut for Seattle Sounders FC 2 of the USL, the reserve side of Seattle Sounders FC of Major League Soccer. The match ended in a 1–0 defeat to Sacramento Republic. In total he made five league appearances for the club during the 2016 USL season.

In January 2019, Jnohope signed for Mosta of the Maltese Premier League. After waiting for four months for his work permit, he appeared in three league matches and one match in the Maltese FA Trophy for the club before the season ended and his 6-month contract expired. His one 2018–19 Maltese FA Trophy appearance came in a 1–2 quarter-final defeat to Birkirkara in which Jnohope scored an own goal. Afterward, he had a training stint with Belgian club RAQM Mons while searching for a new club.

In October 2020, Jnohope was unveiled as a new signing for U.S. Palmese 1912 of the Italian Eccellenza Calabria for the 2020–21 season. In March 2021, he moved to Lernayin Artsakh FC of the Armenian First League. He made his league debut for the club on 15 March against FC Urartu-2, starting the match and playing the full ninety minutes of the 1–0 victory.

On July 26, 2024, Jnohope signed with USL League One side Chattanooga Red Wolves for the remainder of their season.

== International career ==
Jnohope was born in Florida, United States to a Dominican father and Nigerian mother. After initially being undecided about which nation to represent, in July 2019 he was included in Dominica's under-23 squad for 2020 CONCACAF Men's Olympic Qualifying Championship qualification. He scored his team's only goal in its opening match against Jamaica, an eventual surprise 1–1 draw. He went on to make two appearances in the tournament.
