= Għarb Rangers F.C. =

Maltese football club

Għarb Rangers
- Full name: Football Club Għarb Rangers
- Founded: 1968; 58 years ago
- Coordinates: 36°03′32″N 14°12′35″E
- Chairman: Joe Cauchi
- League: GFL Second Division

F.C. Għarb Rangers is a football club from the village of Għarb, on the island of Gozo (Malta). The club was founded in 1968.

They currently play in the Second Division of the Gozo Football League, that they won once in 2017.

== History ==
They took part in the Gozitan championship for two seasons, 1968–69 and 1969–70, with a team formed by local players. Then the team was inactive for 15 years. In 1985, thanks to an agreement with the neighbour town of San Lawrenz, a team named Għarb St. Lawrence Rangers was made up to participate in the Gozitan league 1985–86, organized in a single division with eleven teams. Their record was 0–1–9. Since the following season, St. Lawrence Spurs F.C. and Għarb Rangers are two independent football clubs.

After winning the Second Division of Gozo Football League in 2017, the Rangers competed in the First Division for three years. Għarb Rangers competed in Maltese FA Trophy six times. In 2011–12, 2012–13 and 2015–16 they lost the first round, while in 2016–17 they defeated Xghajra Tornadoes in the preliminary round. In 2019–20, their last appearance in the competition, Rangers lost the first round 2-0 against Gozitan team Xewkija Tigers.

== Honours ==
- GFL Second Division Knock-Out
  - Champions (2): 1999–2000, 2015–16
- GFL Second Division
  - Champions (1): 2016–17
