= Virginia De Brincat =

Margaret of the Sacred Heart of Jesus
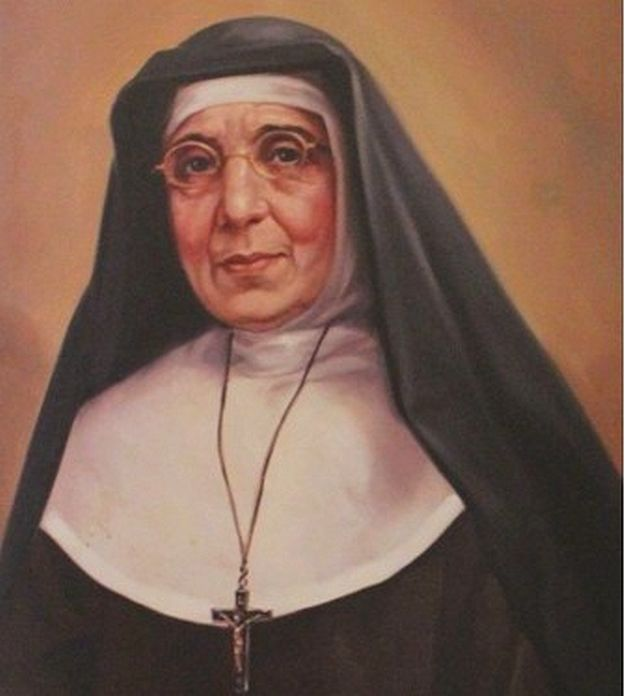
- Born: Virginia De Brincat; November 28, 1862; Kerċem, Malta
- Died: January 22, 1952 (aged 89); Rabat, Malta
- Other names: Margherita of the Sacred Heart of Jesus
- Occupation: mother superior
- Known for: co-founding a religious order

Margaret of the Sacred Heart of Jesus born Virginia De Brincat (28 November 1862 – 22 January 1952) was the Maltese co-founder of the Franciscan Order of the Sacred Heart.

== Life ==
Margaret was born in Kerċem on what is now Malta in 1862. She was drawn to the church and when she was fourteen she arranged to give a vow of chastity to her priest. She had done well at school and she could speak French and Italian well and she was able to make lace which would offer her an income.

At the end of 1877 she joined the "Twelve Stars of the Sacred Heart of Jesus" which had been formed to do good works. Two years later St George's assistant priest Giuseppe Diacono created the "Franciscan Tertiary Teachers" and in 1881 she was part of what had become a religious community. In 1887 she took the name of Margherita of the Sacred Heart of Jesus. She continued her study of languages learning Greek and English.

Giuseppe Diacono was dishearted by the finances of the order he had founded and he planned to dissolve it. Margerita would not agree and she proposed to take responsibility for the order and its problems. She succeeded and Giuseppe Diacono took less interest in the group from that time. She was 27 when she became a superior general and she held this role for the next thirty years. During that time she went to Rome where Pope Benedict XV gave his papal "Decree of Praise" to her community.

Margaret was the Superior in the House of Corfu, Greece from 1911 to 1917 and she died on Malta in Rabat in 1952. In 2014 the Pope agreed that she should be declared Venerable which is a step towards beatification.
