= Second Division Knock-Out =

The Second Division Knock-Out is a football competition that takes place in Gozo, Malta. It is organized by the Gozo Football Association.

The cup holders are Victoria Hotspurs which won the cup after beating 4-0 Żebbuġ Rovers in the final held on April 6, 2024. This competition is played on a knock-out basis between the clubs of the Second Division. The first Second Division Knock-Out took place in the season 1958–59.

== Format ==
Four unseeded teams from the Second Division make it to the preliminary round. The two winners of the respective ties join the two seeded and participate in the semi-finals.

== Cup winners ==
Here is a complete list of the past champions of the Second Division Knock-Out.

- 2023–2024 Victoria Hotspurs
- 2022–2023 Xagħra United
- 2021–2022 Żebbuġ Rovers
- 2015–2016 Għarb Rangers
- 2007–2008 SK Victoria Wanderers
- 2006–2007 Victoria Hotspurs
- 2005–2006 Qala St. Joseph
- 2004–2005 Qala St. Joseph
- 2003–2004 Xagħra United
- 2002–2003 SK Victoria Wanderers
- 2001–2002 SK Victoria Wanderers
- 2000–2001 Xagħra United
- 1999–2000 Għarb Rangers
- 1998–1999 Kercem Ajax
- 1997–1998 Żebbuġ Rovers
- 1996–1997 Kercem Ajax
- 1995–1996 Kercem Ajax
- 1994–1995 Oratory Youths
- 1993–1994 Xewkija Tigers
- 1992–1993 St. Lawrence Spurs
- 1991–1992 Oratory Youths
- 1990–1991 Munxar Falcons
- 1989–1990 Nadur Youngsters
- 1988–1989 was not held
- 1987–1988 Xewkija Tigers
- 1986–1987 was not held
- 1985–1986 was not held
- 1984–1985 was not held
- 1983–1984 was not held
- 1982–1983 was not held
- 1981–1982 was not held
- 1980–1981 was not held
- 1979–1980 Xewkija Tigers
- 1978–1979 was not held
- 1977–1978 SK Victoria Wanderers
- 1976–1977 was not held
- 1975–1976 was not held
- 1974–1975 was not held
- 1973–1974 was not held
- 1972–1973 Sannat Lions
- 1971–1972 Xagħra United
- 1970–1971 Sannat Lions
- 1969–1970 Sannat Lions
- 1968–1969 was not held
- 1967–1968 was not held
- 1966–1967 was not held
- 1965–1966 was not held
- 1964–1965 was not held
- 1963–1964 was not held
- 1962–1963 was not held
- 1961–1962 Xagħra United
- 1960–1961 was not held
- 1958–1959 Victoria Hotspurs

Win count
Club	Times
SK Victoria Wanderers	5
Xagħra United	5
Xewkija Tigers	3
Sannat Lions	3
Kercem Ajax	3
Victoria Hotspurs	3
Oratory Youths	2
Qala St. Joseph	2
Żebbuġ Rovers	2
Munxar Falcons	1
Għarb Rangers	1
St. Lawrence Spurs	1
Nadur Youngsters	1
