= Dexter Xuereb =

Maltese footballer

Personal information
- Date of birth: 21 September 1997 (age 29)
- Place of birth: Pietà, Malta
- Height: 1.80 m (5 ft 11 in)
- Position: Right-back

Team information
- Current team: Hibernians
- Number: 14

Youth career
- –2014: Mosta

Senior career*
Years	Team	Apps	(Gls)
2014–2020	Mosta	89	(6)
2020–2021	Gżira United	21	(0)
2021–2024	Santa Lucia	60	(1)
2024–	Hibernians	55	(1)

International career
2017	Malta U21	2	(0)
2021–	Malta	1	(0)
- * Club domestic league appearances and goals as of 18 May 2026

Dexter Xuereb (born 21 September 1997) is a Maltese footballer who plays as a right-back for Hibernians and the Malta national team.

== Career ==
Xuereb made his international debut for Malta on 30 May 2021 in a friendly match against Northern Ireland.

== Career statistics ==
=== International ===
As of 30 May 2021

Malta
Year	Apps	Goals
2021	1	0
Total	1	0
