= Żebbuġ Rovers F.C. =

Maltese football club

Żebbuġ Rovers Football Club is a Maltese football club located in the village of Żebbuġ, Gozo. Founded in 1975, the club plays in the Second Division of the Gozo Football League.

The Rovers won the Gozo Football League First Division in the 2003–04 season. More recently, they won the BOV GFA 2nd Division Knock-Out tournament on April 18, 2022, defeating Xagħra United 2–0. They placed fifth in the 2022-23 Gozo Football League First Division season.
