= Gozo Football League Second Division =

Association football league in Malta

GFL Second Division
- Founded: 1948
- Country: Gozo, Malta
- Confederation: N.F.-Board
- Number of clubs: 6
- Level on pyramid: 2
- Promotion to: First Division
- Domestic cup(s): G.F.A. Cup; Independence Cup; Freedom Day Cup; Second Division Knock-Out; Second Division Challenge Cup
- Current champions: Sannat Lions F.C. (2025-26)
- Website: Official site
- Current: 2025-26 Second Division

The Gozo Football League Second Division, known as BOV GFL Second Division for sponsorship reasons, is the second and lowest level in the Gozo Football League. The league was first competed in 1948.

The Second Division is played in the same manner as the First Division, each club plays three games against other for a total of 15 games. The season is usually held between September and April, and the champion is promoted to next season's First Division season, replacing the bottom club from the First Division. The second-placed club plays a promotion and relegation play-off against the seventh-placed in the First Division. The majority of the matches are played at the Kercem Ground, with the occasional use of the Gozo Stadium.

== Clubs ==
=== 2025-26 season ===
The following clubs are competing in the 2025-2026 Second Division season.

Club	Position in 2024-25	Location			
Oratory Youths	7th from 1st Division	Victoria, Malta	Għarb Rangers	4th	Għarb
Munxar Falcons	3rd	Munxar			
Sannat Lions	2nd	Sannat			
St. Lawrence Spurs	5th	San Lawrenz			
Żebbuġ Rovers	6th	Żebbuġ			

== Champions ==
- 1948–49 Salesian Youths
- 1952–53 Nadur Olympians
- 1953–54 Kerċem Ajax
- 1957–58 Nadur Olympians
- 1958–59 Victoria Hotspurs
- 1959–60 St. George's
- 1961–62 Xagħra Young Stars
- 1962–63 S.K. Victoria Wanderers
- 1963–64 Għajnsielemk
- 1964–65 Xewkija Tigers
- 1965–66 Għajnsielem
- 1966–67 Sannat Lions
- 1967–68 Victoria United
- 1968–69 Xagħra Young Stars
- 1969–70 Xewkija Tigers
- 1970–71 Oratory Youths
- 1971–72 Xagħra United
- 1972–73 Xewkija Tigers
- 1973–74 Sannat Lions
- 1975–76 Kerċem Ajax
- 1977–78 SK Victoria Wanderers
- 1978–79 Xagħra United
- 1979–80 Calypsian Bosco Youths
- 1980–81 Xewkija Tigers
- 1981–82 Ghajnsielem
- 1983–84 S.K. Victoria Wanderers
- 1984–85 Ghajnsielem
- 1987–88 Xewkija Tigers
- 1988–89 Żebbuġ Rovers
- 1989–90 Nadur Youngsters
- 1990–91 Munxar Falcons
- 1991–92 S.K. Victoria Wanderers
- 1992–93 Żebbuġ Rovers
- 1993–94 St. Lawrence Spurs
- 1994–95 Qala St. Joseph
- 1995–96 Xewkija Tigers
- 1996–97 Kerċem Ajax
- 1997–98 Żebbuġ Rovers
- 1998–99 St. Lawrence Spurs
- 1999–2000 Kerċem Ajax
- 2000–01 Sannat Lions
- 2001–02 Xagħra United
- 2002–03 Sannat Lions
- 2003–04 Xagħra United
- 2004–05 Sannat Lions
- 2005–06 Qala St. Joseph
- 2006–07 Victoria Hotspurs
- 2007–08 S.K. Victoria Wanderers
- 2008–09 Xewkija Tigers
- 2009–10 St. Lawrence Spurs
- 2010–11 Xagħra United
- 2011–12 Kerċem Ajax
- 2012–13 Oratory Youths
- 2013–14 St. Lawrence Spurs
- 2014–15 Għajnsielem
- 2015–16 Xagħra United
- 2016–17 Għarb Rangers
- 2017–18 Munxar Falcons
- 2018–19 Xagħra United
- 2019–20 Sannat Lions F.C.
- 2021–22 Qala Saints
- 2022–23 SK Victoria Wanderers
- 2023–24 Victoria Hotspurs
- 2024–25 Kercem Ajax F.C.
- 2025--26 Sannat Lions F.C.

=== Wins by club ===
As of 28 April 2024

- Clubs participating in the 2018–19 GFL Second Division are denoted in **bold** type
- Clubs no longer active are denoted in italics

Club	Wins
**Xagħra United**	8
Xewkija Tigers	7
Sannat lions	7
**SK Victoria wanderers**	6
Kerċem Ajax	5
Għajnsielem	5
**Oratory Youths**	4
**St. Lawrence Spurs**	4
Nadur Youngsters	3
**Żebbuġ Rovers**	3
**Qala St. Joseph**	3
Victoria Hotspurs	3
Munxar Falcons	2
Għarb Rangers	1
St. George's	1
