= TVM+ =

Maltese educational television channel

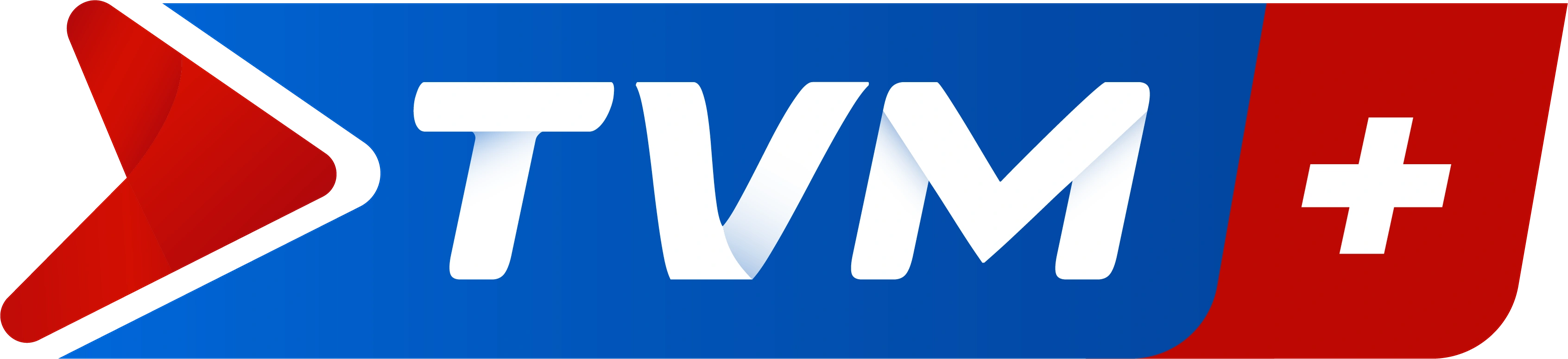
- Current TVM+ logo (2024–)
- Country: Malta
- Headquarters: Gwardamanġa, Malta

Programming
- Language: Maltese
- Picture format: 1080i HDTV

Ownership
- Owner: Public Broadcasting Services (Government of Malta)
- Sister channels: TVM; TVMSport+

History
- Launched: 8 March 2012; 14 years ago
- Replaced: Education 22 (1996–2012)
- Former names: TVMNews+ (2021–2024); TVM2 (2012–2021)

Links
- Website: tvmnews.mt

Availability

Terrestrial
- Free-to-air: 43 (UHF)
- GO: 104
- Melita: 104

TVM+ (formerly TVMNews+ and originally TVM2) is a terrestrial television network in Malta, operated by national broadcaster Public Broadcasting Services that was launched in 2012. Unlike the more wide-ranging TVM network, TVM+ focuses primarily on newscasting and educational television.

== History ==
Former TVMNews+ logo (2021–2023) which was met with criticism from the general public

The network was originally launched as Education 22 (more commonly known as E22) an educational television service operated by the Maltese government's Ministry of Education, Employment and the Family. Broadcasts started on 18 October 1996, at the initiative of Charles Xuereb, with a live broadcast from the National Library in Valletta. In March 2012, responsibility for the channel was shifted from the Ministry to the national broadcaster, Public Broadcasting Services (PBS), and the network began broadcasting as TVM2 on 8 March 2012.

Following a restructuring of operations within PBS, as from October 2021 the network has been broadcasting under the name of TVMNews+.

After TVMNews+ was met with criticism due to its changed name, the channel starting bearing the name TVM+ in September 2024.

== Programming ==
TVM+ primarily airs news and educational programmes, including direct learning programmes on Maltese history and culture as well as coverage of current events. It also airs a nightly newscast in Maltese Sign Language for persons who are deaf or hearing impaired. It also airs news broadcasting and also an English version. Like TVM, special programmes like football and festivals are sometimes broadcast yearly.
