= St. Lawrence Spurs F.C. =

Maltese football club

St. Lawrence Spurs Football Club is a Maltese football club from the town of San Lawrenz, Gozo. The club was founded in 1968. They currently play in the Gozo Football League Second Division.

== History ==
St. Lawrence Spurs was established in 1968 and took part in three successive seasons which are 1968/69, 1969/70, 1970/71. After having participated in those seasons, the team had to stop because many players have migrated to Australia.

In 1985, the team has been established over time along with the village of Għarb and took part in the 1985/86 season. The years following Għarb have formed their own team which was Għarb Rangers F.C. This led to a renaissance of St. Lawrence Spurs as an independent team.

From the 1986/1987 season, St. Lawrence Spurs always competed in the tournament organized by the GFA, these years were years of disappointment, success and also hard work.

== Current squad ==
Note: Flags indicate national team as defined under FIFA eligibility rules; some limited exceptions apply. Players may hold more than one non-FIFA nationality.

No.	Pos.	Nation	Player
1	GK	MLT	Joel Xiberras
12	GK	MLT	Courtney Mercieca
25	DF	NGA	Ademilua Adebayo
17	DF	MLT	Justin Attard
28	DF	MLT	Wayne Hill
3	DF	MLT	Franklin Grima
12	DF	MLT	John Axiaq
20	DF	MLT	Arthur Grima

== Honors ==
Second Division Gozo:

- Winners (4): 1993–94, 1998–99, 2009–10, 2013–14
- Runners-up (2) : 1999-00, 2003-04

Second Division Knock-Out Cup:

- Winners (2) : 1992-93, 2018-2019
- Runners-up (5) : 1989-90, 1993-94, 2001-02, 2005-06, 2012-13
