= Kerċem =

Ta' Kerċem
- Local council
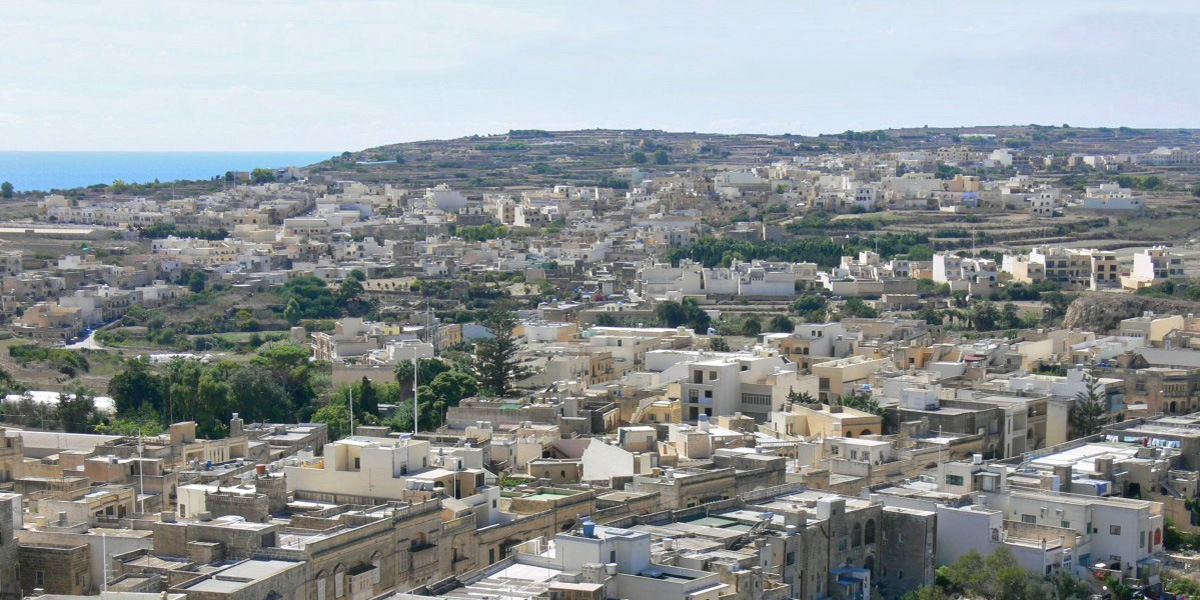
- View of Ta' Kerċem

- Flag Coat of arms

- Ta' Kerċem
- Coordinates: 36°2′26″N 14°13′47″E
- Country: Malta
- Region: Gozo Region
- District: Gozo and Comino District
- Borders: Fontana, Għarb, Għasri, Munxar, San Lawrenz, Victoria

Government
  - Mayor: Mario Azzopardi (PN)

Area
  - Total: 5.5 km^{2} (2.1 sq mi)

Population (July 2024)
  - Total: 1,932
  - Density: 350/km^{2} (910/sq mi)
- Demonym(s): Kerċmi (m), Kerċmija (f), Kerċmin (pl)
- Time zone: UTC+1 (CET)
  - Summer (DST): UTC+2 (CEST)
- Postal code: KCM
- Dialing code: 356
- ISO 3166 code: MT-22
- Patron saints: St. Gregory; Our Lady of Perpetual Help
- Website: Official website

Ta' Kerċem is a village in Malta, in the island of Gozo. The population of Kerċem was 1,932 in July 2024. This included 971 males and 961 females; 1,703 Maltese nationals and 229 foreign nationals.

Ta' Kerċem evolved into a village community around chapel dedicated to Pope Gregory the Great built around 1581 and replaced in 1851 by a church which was enlarged to its present state between 1906 and 1910. Ta' Kerċem became a distinct parish on 10 March 1885 and since 17 August 1885, the church was additionally co-dedicated to Our Lady of Perpetual Help.

The village of Ta' Kerċem has a population of around 1700 people. Ta' Kerċem is home to Kerċem Ajax Stadium, one of the biggest stadiums in Gozo, mainly used for Gozo Football League Second Division games, which is the home stadium of Kerċem Ajax F.C.

Incorporated within Ta' Kerċem is the hamlet of Santa Luċija, Gozo.

In 2018, the former police station in the locality was vacated and put up for sale.

== Notable people ==
- Virginia De Brincat, nun.
