= Tony Bezzina Stadium =

Stadium in Paola, Malta

- Kordin
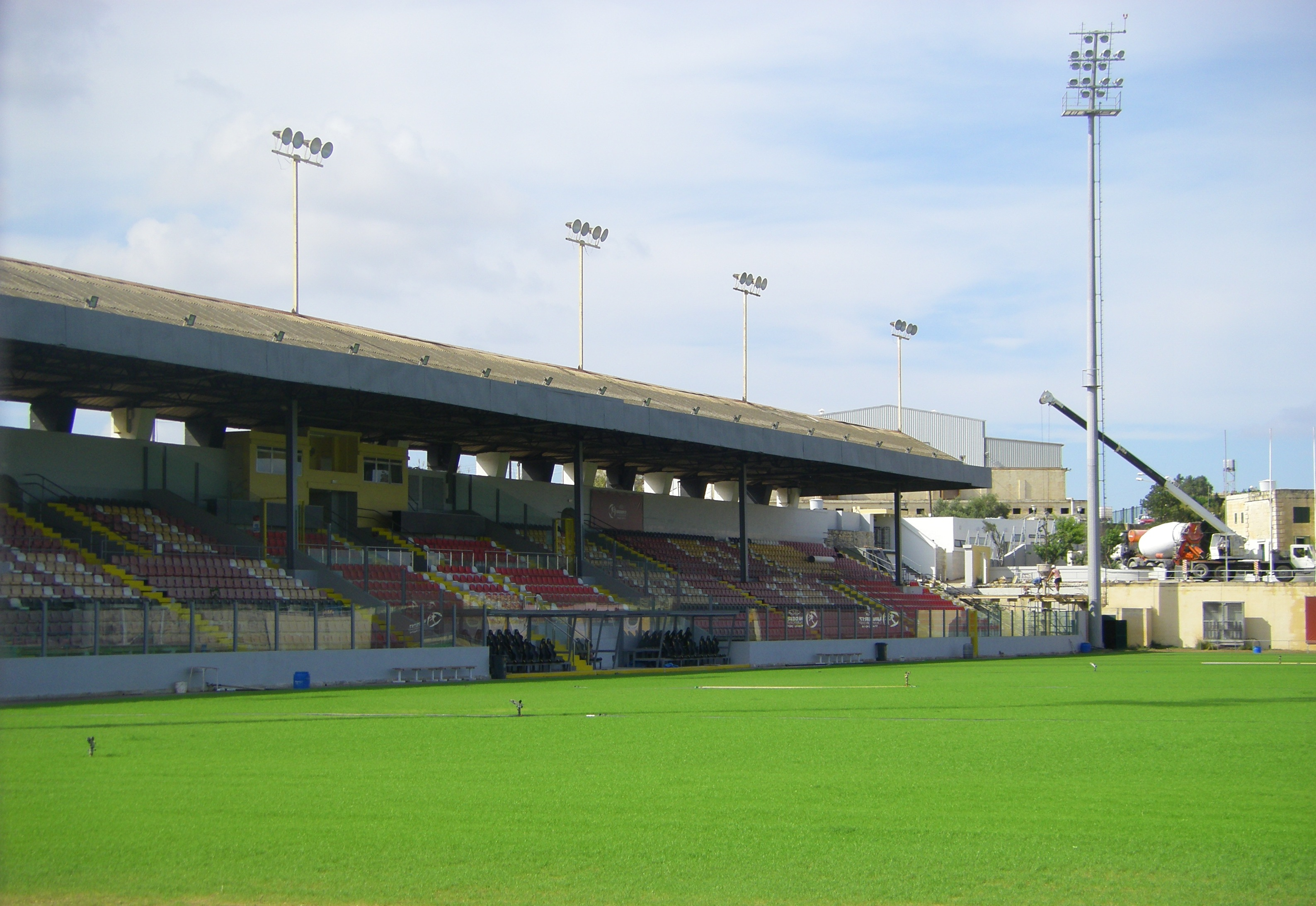
- Interactive map of Tony Bezzina Stadium
- Full name: Tony Bezzina Stadium
- Location: Paola, Malta
- Coordinates: 35°52′59″N 14°30′47″E
- Owner: Government of Malta
- Operator: Hibernians
- Capacity: 3,038
- Surface: Grass
- Field size: (105.5 x 68)

Construction
- Opened: 9 November 1986

Tenants
- Hibernians; Maltese Premier League; Malta women's national football team

Tony Bezzina Stadium is a multi-use stadium in Paola, Malta. The Hibernians football ground was inaugurated on 9 November 1986. Hibernians became the first Maltese club to have their own football pitch. Nonetheless, Hibernians play most of their league matches in the National Stadium, Ta' Qali, since nearly all the Maltese Premier League matches are played there.

The ground is used by Hibernians for their everyday training sessions. It is also used by the Malta Football Association to host matches from the Maltese First Division. The Malta national rugby union team have recently started to use the ground for their international matches.

Hibernians played their first European match on this pitch on 23 July 1996 when they played against Uralmash Yekaterinburg in the Intertoto Cup, losing the match 2–1. It is also the second-largest stadium in the country.

== Facilities ==
The Hibernians Stadium consists of two turf pitches. There is a full size football pitch, and a smaller pitch which is approximately half the width of the main pitch. The club house area has five dressing rooms with showers, physiotherapy rooms, and a board room. The stadium can hold up about 8000 spectators. In the stands there are two different sections, and a VIP area. The ground is also equipped with a scoreboard and floodlighting system.
