= Victor Tedesco Stadium =

Football stadium in Hamrun, Malta

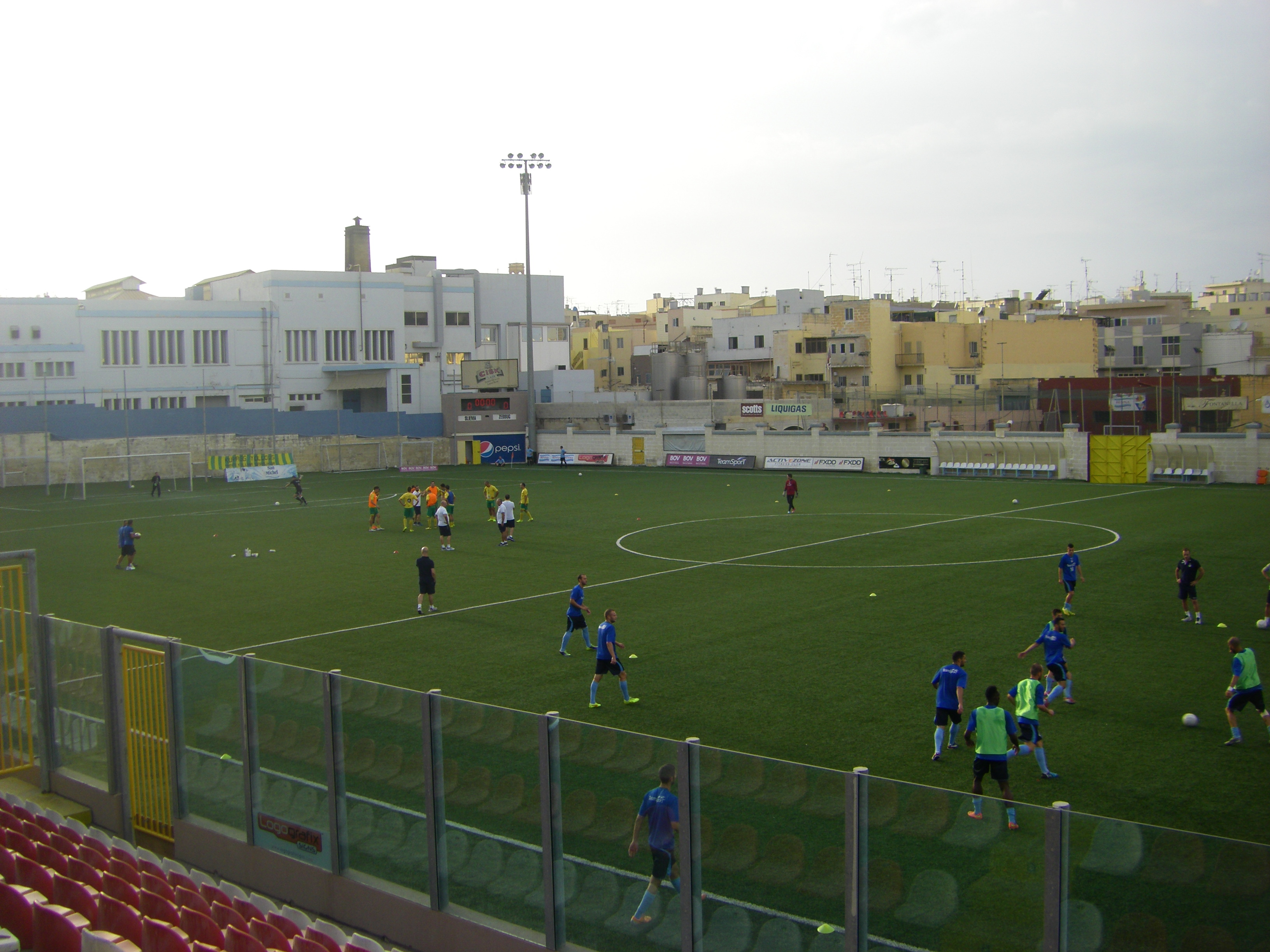
- Interactive map of Victor Tedesco Stadium
- Location: Hamrun, Malta
- Owner: Government of Malta
- Operator: Ħamrun Spartans
- Capacity: 1,962
- Surface: Artificial turf

Construction
- Opened: 1996
- Renovated: 2008 (new pitch)
- Expanded: 2012

Tenants
- Ħamrun Spartans (Not in the Maltese Premier League); Maltese Challenge League; Maltese National Amateur League

The Victor Tedesco Stadium is a stadium in Hamrun, Malta. It opened in 1996. It has a capacity of 6,000, with 1,800 seated. It is the home ground of Maltese football club Ħamrun Spartans, who currently play in the Maltese Premier League. It is used for matches from the Maltese Premier League, the Maltese First Division, and some games from the Maltese Second Division. It is also used by all the Ħamrun Spartans teams from the youth teams to the senior teams for training. The stadium also has a bar, underground dressing rooms, some offices, and a five-a-side pitch next door.

On 4 June 2010 rugby league was played at the ground. The Malta Knights came from 10–0 down midway through the first half to defeat Norway, 30–20 to win the Rugby League European Federation Bowl.

== Future ==
In July 2023, it was announced that the stadium will be replaced with a new stadium, named Spartans Arena. The new stadium will have a seated capacity of slightly over 3,000 people.

== Gallery ==
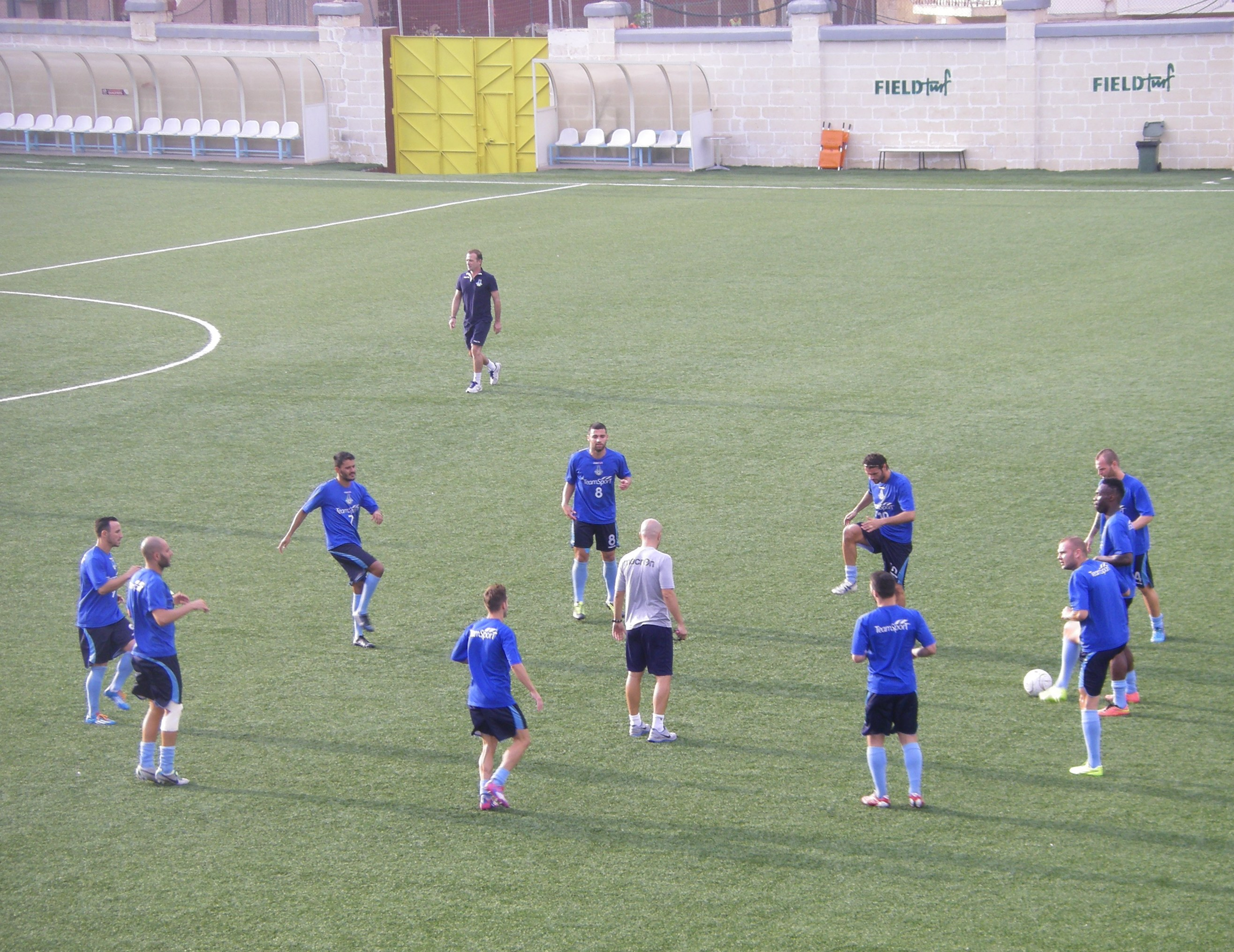
Training of Sliema Wanderers before kick-off against Żebbuġ Rangers F.C. on October 2, 2014 in Victor Tedesco Stadium, Ħamrun.

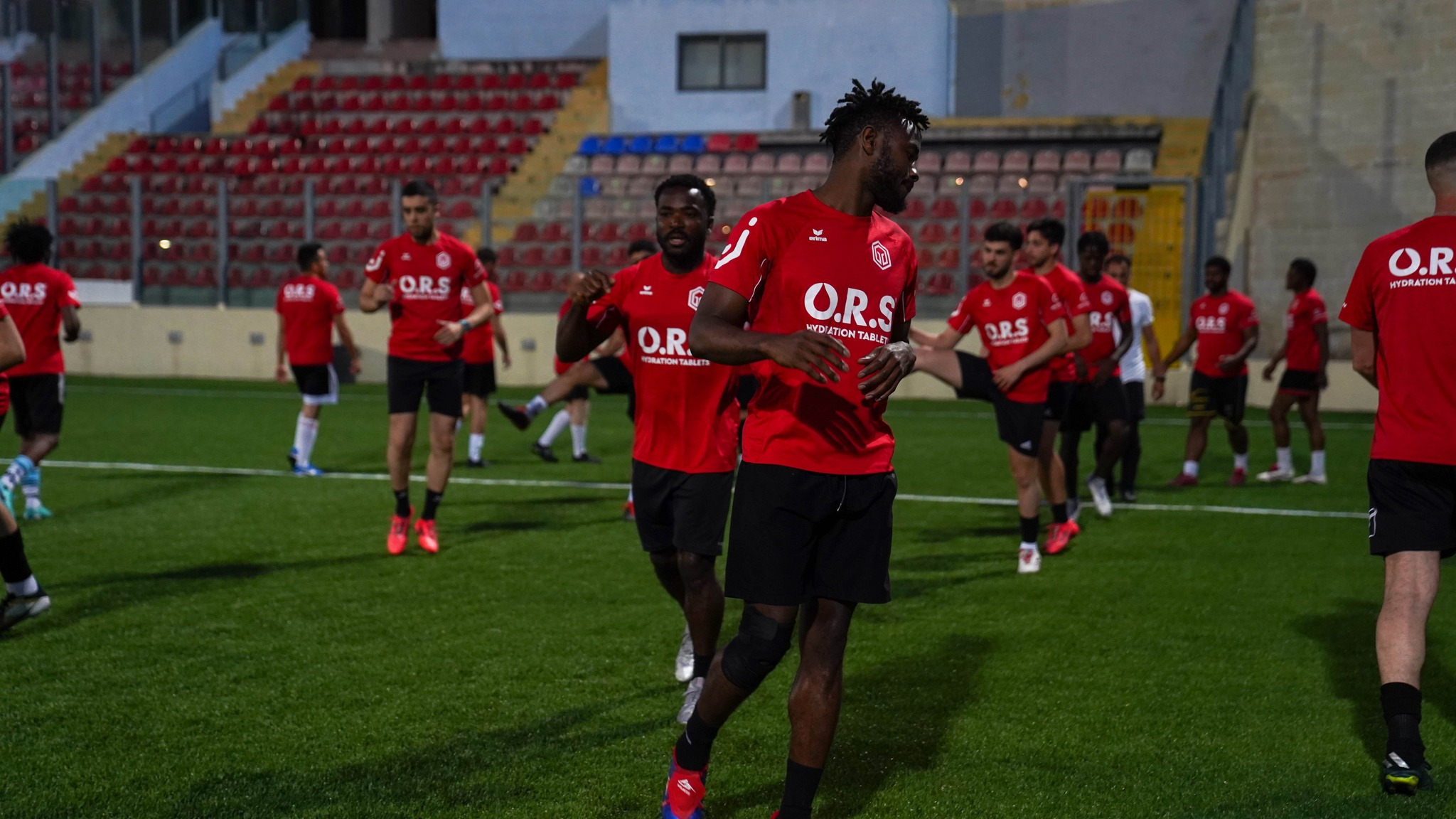
Hamrun Sporting Players Training at Victor Tedesco Stadium
