= Gozo Football League =

Association football league in Gozo, Malta

- Country: Gozo, Malta
- Confederation: UEFA
- Divisions: Gozo Football League First Division; Gozo Football League Second Division
- Number of clubs: 13
- Level on pyramid: 1–2 (from 1999–00)
- Website: gozofa.com

The Gozo Football League is a two-tier football competition for clubs on the Maltese island of Gozo. The league is run by the Gozo Football Association.

== Overview ==
Following the switch of Victoria Hotspurs to Malta as from the 2024–25 season, the league is contested by 13 clubs. These are split into two divisions, with 7 contesting the First Division and 6 the Second Division.

The First Division is the highest level of the football league system in Gozo, whereas the Second Division is the lowest. At the end of the season, the winners of the Second Division are promoted, while the bottom club of the First Division is relegated. A promotion/relegation playoff game takes place between the 6th placed First Division club and the club placing second in the Second Division.

During the three seasons 1996-97 to 1998–99, the Gozitan football league was contested by 15 clubs, namely the current 13 clubs, Victoria Hotspurs and Marsalforn St. Pauli FC. This allowed the Gozitan football league to span three divisions, with the Gozo Third Division replacing the Second Division as the bottom league.

== League system ==
Level	League(s)/Division(s)
1	Gozo Football League First Division; 7 clubs
	↓↑ 1 direct club, 1 play-off club
2	Gozo Football League Second Division; 6 clubs

== Stadiums ==
Generally the Gozo Stadium is used for First Division games, while most commonly Kercem Arkafort Stadium is used for Second Division games, although both divisions have used each stadium to some extent.

In the recent past matches were also played at the Sannat Ground in Sannat, which is currently undergoing renovation.
