= Kerċem Ajax Stadium =

Stadium in Kerċem, Gozo, Malta

- Kerċem Ground
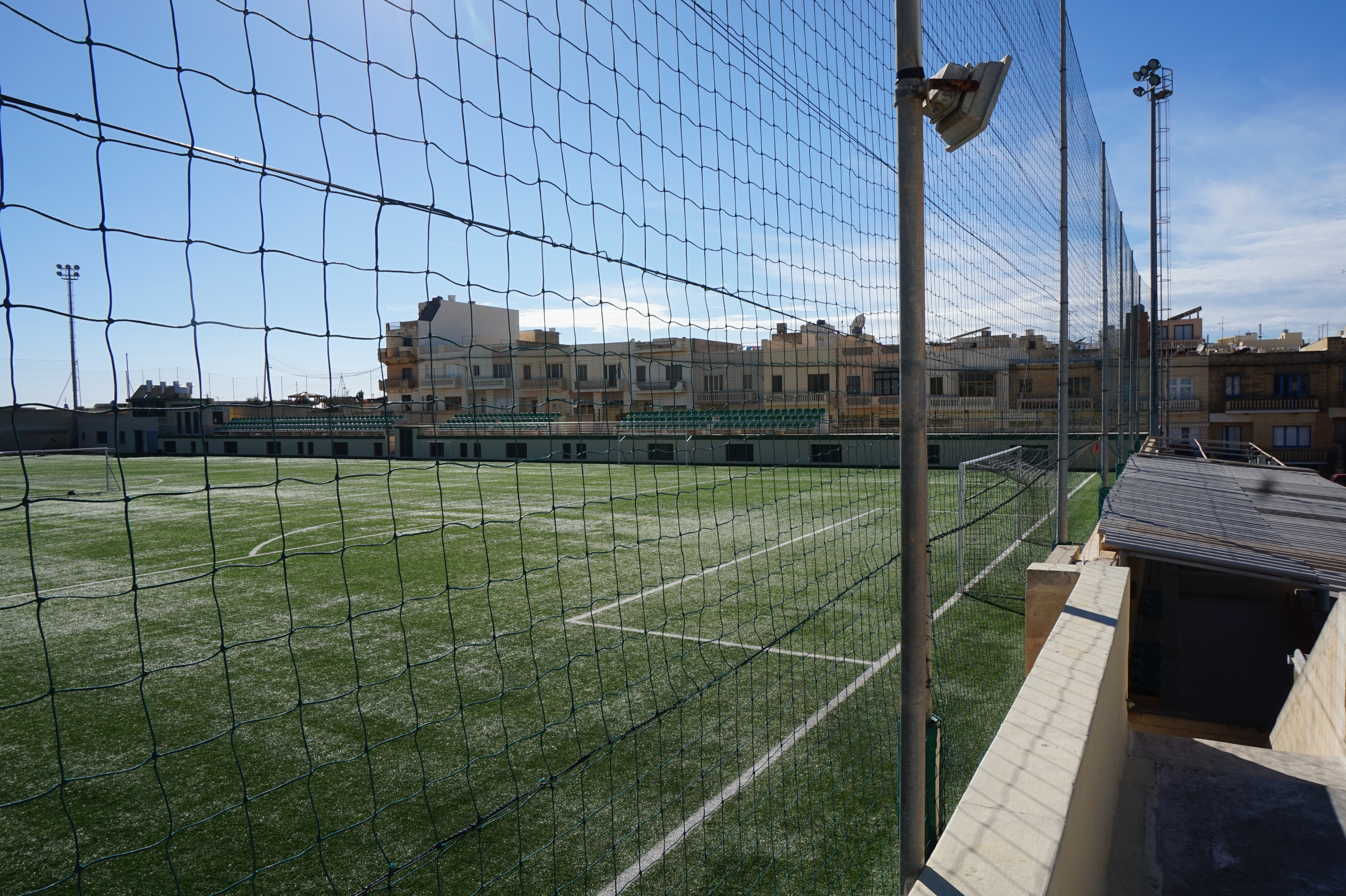
- Interactive map of Kerċem Ajax Stadium
- Full name: Kerċem Ajax Stadium
- Location: Kerċem, Gozo
- Coordinates: 36°02′22″N 14°13′46″E
- Owner: Government of Malta
- Operator: Kerċem Ajax
- Capacity: ~1,000
- Surface: Artificial turf

Construction
- Opened: 3 October 2014

Tenant
- Gozo Football League Second Division

The Kerċem Ajax Stadium (Maltese: il-Grawnd ta' Kerċem) is a stadium located in Kerċem, Gozo, Malta. The stadium is believed to seat around 1,000 people and hosts the Gozo Football League Second Division and domestic cup matches.

== Background and description ==
The stadium was inaugurated on 3 October 2014 and was part of an estimated €6 million investment made by the Malta Football Association with the help of the Government in completing ten infrastructural projects in Malta. The stadium comprises one stand, which is accessible from Wenzu Mintoff Street. The stand seats around 1,000 people and is host to a number of facilities, including dressing rooms, a clinic and a rehabilitation pool and a VIP room.

=== The Raymond Mercieca Sports Complex ===
The stadium makes part of the Raymond Mercieca Sports Complex, which was upgraded back in 2007 at a cost of Lm17,000. Besides the stadium, the complex includes a five-a-side pitch, a tennis court and two bocci pitches. As at 2017, the tennis court has fallen in a state of despair and is now being used as a parking.

== See also ==
- List of football stadiums in Malta
