= 2023–24 Maltese FA Trophy =

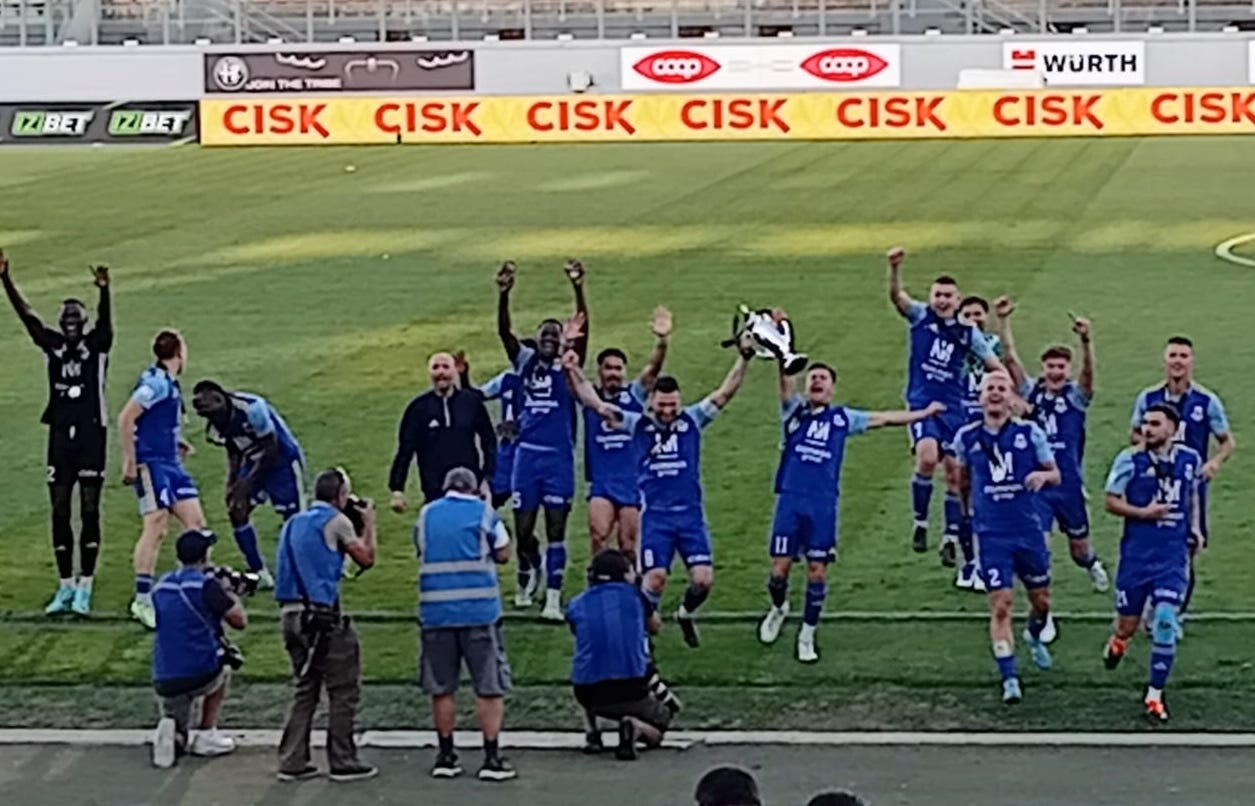
- Sliema Wanderers lifting the Maltese FA Trophy after the final.

Tournament details
- Country: Malta
- Dates: 12 December 2023 - 12 May 2024
- Teams: 42

Final positions
- Champions: Sliema Wanderers
- Runners-up: Floriana

Tournament statistics
- Matches played: 41
- Goals scored: 146 (3.56 per match)
- Top goal scorer: Andre Carlos Penha Da Costa (4 Goals)
- All statistics correct as of 12 May 2024.

The 2023–24 Maltese FA Trophy, officially named IZIBET FA Trophy due to sponsorship reasons, was the 86th edition of the football cup competition, the FA Trophy. The winners earned a place in the second qualifying round of the 2024–25 UEFA Conference League.

Birkirkara were the defending champions. But were eliminated in the Semi-Finals by Sliema Wanderers

Sliema Wanderers won the cup (their twenty-second Maltese FA Trophy win) on 12 May 2024, defeating Floriana 4–2 on penalties after a 0–0 draw.

== Preliminary round ==
Ten preliminary round matches were played on 12 and 13 December 2023, featuring twelve teams from the 2023–24 Maltese Challenge League, six teams from the 2023–24 Gozo First Division, and two teams from the 2023–24 Maltese National Amateur League.

The draw was held on 7 November 2023. The four remaining Maltese Challenge League teams (Attard, Luqa St. Andrew's, Żabbar St. Patrick, and Żurrieq), the two remaining teams from the Gozo First Division (Għajnsielem and Xewkija Tigers), and two teams from the Maltese National Amateur League (Marsaskala and Mġarr United) received byes.

| 12 December 2023 | Kirkop United (3) | 1–2 | Lija Athletic (2) | Hamrun |
| 20:30 CET | Matthew Borg 45' | | Erjon Beu 80' (pen.); Leonardo Agius 90+5' | Stadium: Victor Tedesco Stadium; Referee: Daniel Portelli |

| 13 December 2023 | Melita (2) | 5–7 (a.e.t.) | Qala Saints (Gozo) (1) | Mosta |
| 11:15 CET | Benjamin Cassar 81'; Andre Carlos Penha Da Costa 84', 102', 113' (pen.), 120+2' | | Sintayehu Curmi 12'; Igor Nedeljković 87' (pen.), 96', 120+1'; Joao Vitor Ferrari Silva 92'; Nathan Chukwudi Njoku 105'; Lucas Baretto Da Silva 111' | Stadium: Charles Abela Memorial Stadium; Referee: Andrea Naudi |

| 13 December 2023 | Victoria Wanderers (Gozo) (1) | 1–2 | Marsa (2) | Kerċem |
| 12:00 CET | Caique Silvio Souza Da Silva 2' | | Paul Lapira 15'; Dylan Agius 18' (pen.) | Stadium: Kerċem Ajax Stadium; Referee: Slobodan Petrovic |

| 13 December 2023 | Msida Saint-Joseph (2) | 5–1 | Xagħra United (Gozo) (1) | Mosta |
| 13:45 CET | Victor Ifeanyi Mbata 42', 45+1' (pen.), 53'; David Chidera Ejiofor 66'; Lian Xuereb 80' | | Daniel Mesa Pineros 76' | Stadium: Charles Abela Memorial Stadium; Referee: Wayne Sammut |

| 13 December 2023 | Żejtun Corinthians (2) | 3–2 (a.e.t.) | Kercem Ajax (Gozo) (1) | Hamrun |
| 14:00 CET | Matthew Mifsud 90+2'; Jairo Santos De Oliveira Filho 96'; Fahad Bardiro 118' | | Kaio Lucas Nunes Santos 75', 91' | Stadium: Victor Tedesco Stadium; Referee: Sandro Spiteri |

| 13 December 2023 | Nadur Youngsters (Gozo) (1) | 2–2 (a.e.t.) (5–3 p) | St. Andrews (2) | Kerċem |
| 14:30 CET | Joao Vitor De Oliveira Florencio 38'; Joseph Zammit 120' | | Christian Mercieca 42'; William James England 117' | Stadium: Kerċem Ajax Stadium; Referee: Darryl Agius |
| | Penalties |
| | Joao Vitor De Oliveira Florencio (penalty scored); Stefan Cassar (penalty scored); Joseph Zammit (penalty scored); Ian Xuereb (penalty scored); Marcelo Jr Barbosa (penalty scored) | | (penalty scored) Brayan Samuel Nyetam Junior; (penalty scored) Nicholas Galea; (penalty scored) Luke Anthony Borg; (penalty missed) William James England |

| 13 December 2023 | St. George's (3) | 1–5 | Swieqi United (2) | Hamrun |
| 16:30 CET | Rudy Cassar 62' | | Gilberto Martins Leite Carrara 4' (pen.); Salis Ibrahim 38', 61'; Robinson Blandon Rendon 74' (pen.), 85' | Stadium: Victor Tedesco Stadium; Referee: Ezekiel Barbara |

| 13 December 2023 | Oratory Youths (Gozo) (1) | 0–2 | Fgura United (2) | Kerċem |
| 17:00 CET | | | Dylan Caruana 10'; Tobi Akiti 11' | Stadium: Kerċem Ajax Stadium; Referee: Jo-Anna Vassallo |

| 13 December 2023 | Senglea Athletic (2) | 2–2 (a.e.t.) (2–3 p) | Pietà Hotspurs (2) | Ta' Qali |
| 19:00 CET | Steven Meilak 76'; Alilu Issaka 119' | | Kian Leonardi 76', 117' | Stadium: Centenary Stadium; Referee: Fyodor Zammit |

| 13 December 2023 | Tarxien Rainbows (2) | 1–2 | Żebbuġ Rangers (2) | Hamrun |
| 19:00 CET | Bradley Sciberras 1' | | Bradley Sciberras 12', 24' | Stadium: Victor Tedesco Stadium; Referee: Anthony Paul Vella |

== Round of 32 ==
Sixteen matches played between 11–15 January, featuring the ten preliminary round winners, the 14 teams from the 2023–24 Maltese Premier League, and the eight teams given preliminary round byes.

The draw for the Round of 32 and Round of 16 was held on 22 December 2023. The draws were held by Malta FA Director of Football Operations Stephen Azzopardi together with former Malta national team player Justin Haber and Franco Degabriele Chief Commercial Officer of IZIBET.

| 11 January 2024 | Santa Lucia (1) | 2–0 | Marsa (2) | Ta' Qali |
| 20:30 CET | Alessio Piazza 16'; Aleksa Mrdja 48' | | | Stadium: Centenary Stadium; Referee: Fyodor Zammit |

| 13 January 2024 | Birkirkara (1) | 3–1 | Attard (2) | Ta' Qali |
| 14:00 CET | Maxuell Maia 61'; Andrei Ciolacu 75' (pen.); Jake Micallef 90+3' (o.g.) | | Camilo Del Castillo Escobar 67' | Stadium: Centenary Stadium; Referee: Slawomir Olucha |

| 13 January 2024 | Floriana (1) | 2–0 | Naxxar Lions (1) | Paola |
| 14:00 CET | Matías García 24'; Matheus Nogureira Albuguerque de Sousa 90+5' | | | Stadium: Tony Bezzina Stadium; Referee: Matthew De Gabriele |

| 13 January 2024 | Żabbar St. Patrick (2) | 1–2 | Żebbuġ Rangers (2) | Ħamrun |
| 14:00 CET | Brian Ariel Gambarte 43' | | Duvan Mosquera Torres 39' (pen.); Johann Bezzina 90+4' | Stadium: Victor Tedesco Stadium; Referee: Joseph Scerri |

| 13 January 2024 | Marsaxlokk (1) | 5–0 | Żejtun Corinthians (2) | Paola |
| 16:30 CET | Yuri 26'; Sunday Akinbule 36'; Samuel Boakye 52'; Jacob Walker 65'; Diego Pires Dall'Oca 80' | | | Stadium: Tony Bezzina Stadium; Referee: Glen Tonna |

| 13 January 2024 | Mosta (1) | 5–1 | Pietà Hotspurs (2) | Ta' Qali |
| 16:30 CET | Christian Ndubuisi Nnaji 23', 54'; Precious Linus Tenebe 38', 49'; Jean Paul Farrugia 69' | | Hibiki Mochizuki 32' | Stadium: Centenary Stadium; Referee: Slobodan Petrovic |

| 13 January 2024 | Msida Saint-Joseph (2) | 1–3 | Mġarr United (3) | Ħamrun |
| 16:30 CET | Jean Pierre Mifsud Triganza 69' | | Nicholas Schembri 10'; Saint Ebisindor Christian 26', 90' | Stadium: Victor Tedesco Stadium; Referee: Vladimir Rizoski |

| 13 January 2024 | Ħamrun Spartans (1) | 3–0 | Lija Athletic (2) | Ta' Qali |
| 19:00 CET | Uroš Đuranović 9'; Kean Scicluna 72'; Luke Montebello 84' | | | Stadium: Centenary Stadium; Referee: Fyodor Zammit |

| 14 January 2024 | Balzan (1) | 2–1 | Żurrieq (2) | Ta' Qali |
| 11:00 CET | Grech 52'; Aguek 80' | | Baker 88' | Stadium: Centenary Stadium; Referee: Darryl Agius |

| 14 January 2024 | Nadur Youngsters (Gozo) (1) | 1–1 (a.e.t.) (3–4 p) | Sirens (1) | Xewkija |
| 13:00 CET | Marcelo Jr Barbosa 31' (pen.) | | Bismark Asare 52' | Stadium: Gozo Stadium; Referee: Alex Johnson |
| | Penalties |
| | Joao Vitor De Oliveira Florencio (penalty scored); Stefan Cassar (penalty missed); Ian Xuereb (penalty missed); Joseph Mario Vella (penalty scored); Marcelo Pereira Muniz (penalty scored) | | (penalty scored) Kwasi Donsu; (penalty scored) Sacha Borg; (penalty missed) Bismark Asare; (penalty scored) Daniel Agius; (penalty scored) Hafiz Mohammed Akadom |

| 14 January 2024 | Hibernians (1) | 2–0 | Qala Saints (Gozo) (1) | Ta' Qali |
| 14:00 CET | Degabriele 56' (pen.); Bastianos 76' | | | Stadium: Centenary Stadium; Referee: Andrea Sciriha |

| 14 January 2024 | Luqa St. Andrew's (2) | 1–2 | Swieqi United (2) | Ħamrun |
| 14:00 CET | Nwaogu 89' | | Pisani 63'; Vasilchik 76' | Stadium: Victor Tedesco Stadium; Referee: Andrea Naudi |

| 14 January 2024 | Xewkija Tigers (Gozo) (1) | 0–3 | Gudja United (1) | Xewkija |
| 15:30 CET | | | Zammit 14', 28', 38' | Stadium: Gozo Stadium; Referee: Daniel Casha |

| 14 January 2024 | Valletta (1) | 7–1 | Għajnsielem (Gozo) (1) | Ta' Qali |
| 16:30 CET | Brandon Paiber 19'; Federico Falcone 42', 48', 55'; Zak Barbara 76'; Klose Azzopardi Conti 80', 83' | | Godwin Emmanuel 51' | Stadium: Centenary Stadium; Referee: Ishmael Barbara |

| 14 January 2024 | Sliema Wanderers (1) | 3–0 | Marsaskala (3) | Ta' Qali |
| 19:00 CET | Mohamed Abdulahi Awad 10', 40'; Joseph Minala 26' (pen.) | | | Stadium: Centenary Stadium; Referee: Emanuel Grech |

| 15 January 2024 | Gzira United (1) | 2–0 | Fgura United (2) | Ta' Qali |
| 18:00 CET | Lucas Ribeiro De Oliveira 64', 72' | | | Stadium: Centenary Stadium; Referee: Daniel Portelli |

== Round of 16 ==
Eight matches were played on 6–8 February, featuring the 16 Round of 32 winners.

The draw for the Round of 32 and Round of 16 was held on 22 December 2023. The draws were held by Malta FA Director of Football Operations Stephen Azzopardi together with former Malta national team player Justin Haber and Franco Degabriele Chief Commercial Officer of IZIBET. The round includes one team from the third tier, the lowest-ranked team remaining in the competition: Mġarr United.

| 6 February 2024 | Birkirkara (1) | 1–0 (a.e.t.) | Sirens (1) | Paola |
| 18:00 CET | Omar Elouni 113' | | | Stadium: Tony Bezzina Stadium; Referee: Malcolm Spiteri |

| 6 February 2024 | Floriana (1) | 7–1 | Żebbuġ Rangers (2) | Ta' Qali |
| 18:15 CET | Owen Spiteri 31'; Kemar Reid 57', 70', 75'; Matías García 60'; Kyrian Nwoko 61'; Christos Rovas 77' | | Duvan Mosquera Torres 45' | Stadium: Centenary Stadium; Referee: Daniel Casha |

| 6 February 2024 | Mosta (1) | 2–1 | Valletta (1) | Paola |
| 20:30 CET | Maxmillian İhekuna 17'; Chidera Nwoga 33' | | Cardoso 73' | Stadium: Tony Bezzina Stadium; Referee: Glen Tonna |

| 6 February 2024 | Marsaxlokk (1) | 3–0 | Swieqi United (2) | Ta' Qali |
| 20:45 CET | Yuri 26'; Sunday Akinbule 52', 60' | | | Stadium: Centenary Stadium; Referee: Darryl Agius |

| 7 February 2024 | Gzira United (1) | 1–0 | Hibernians (1) | Ta' Qali |
| 18:00 CET | Thaylor Aldama 30' | | | Stadium: Ta' Qali National Stadium; Referee: Alex Johnson |

| 7 February 2024 | Santa Lucia (1) | 3–3 (a.e.t.) (3–4 p) | Mġarr United (3) | Ta' Qali |
| 20:15 CET | Lucas Sena 55'; Carlos Gabriel 90+3'; Aleksa Mrdja 96' | | Saint Ebisindor Christian 38'; Joseph Paul Zammit 76', 100' | Stadium: Centenary Stadium; Referee: Ezekiel Barbara |
| | Penalties |
| | Gonzalo Nicolas Virano (penalty scored); Adam Bradshaw (penalty missed); Jurgen Pisani (penalty scored); Carlos Gabriel (penalty scored); Daniel Letherby (penalty missed) | | (penalty scored) Kane Paul Farrugia; (penalty scored) Saint Ebisindor Christian; (penalty missed) Gordon Saliba; (penalty scored) Liam Portelli; (penalty scored) Nicholas Schembri |

| 7 February 2024 | Sliema Wanderers (1) | 1–0 (a.e.t.) | Balzan (1) | Ta' Qali |
| 20:30 CET | Joseph Minala 117' (pen.) | | | Stadium: Ta' Qali National Stadium; Referee: Slobodan Petrovic |

| 8 February 2024 | Ħamrun Spartans (1) | 3–0 | Gudja United (1) | Ta' Qali |
| 20:30 CET | Elionay Freitas Da Silva 4'; Luke Montebello 25'; Eder 90+3' | | | Stadium: Centenary Stadium; Referee: Emanuel Grech |

== Quarter-finals ==
The draw for the quarter-finals was held on 5 March 2024. The draws were held on Tuesday by Malta FA Director Football Operations Stephen Azzopardi assisted by former Malta national football team players Roderick Briffa and IZIBET Brand Ambassador Andrew Hogg. Four matches were played on 30 March 2024, featuring the eight Round of 16 winners. The round included one team from the third tier, the lowest-ranked team remaining in the competition: Mġarr United.

| 30 March 2024 | Gzira United (1) | 2–0 | Mġarr United (3) | Ta' Qali |
| 14:00 CEST | Lucas Macula 83'; Thaylor Aldama 90+1' | | | Stadium: Centenary Stadium; Referee: Alex Johnson |

| 30 March 2024 | Marsaxlokk (1) | 0–2 | Floriana (1) | Paola |
| 14:00 CEST | | | Willis Alvés Furtado 49', 87' | Stadium: Tony Bezzina Stadium; Referee: Philip Farrugia |

| 30 March 2024 | Birkirkara (1) | 2–2 (a.e.t.) (4–3 p) | Ħamrun Spartans (1) | Ta' Qali |
| 15:00 CEST | Alexander Satariano 45+3'; Steve Borg 68' (o.g.) | | Uroš Đuranović 43', 74' (pen.) | Stadium: Ta' Qali National Stadium; Referee: Trustin Farrugia Cann |
| | Penalties |
| | Maxuell Maia (penalty scored); Simon Zibo (penalty missed); Andrei Ciolacu (penalty scored); Neil Micallef (penalty scored); Alessandro Coppola (penalty scored) | | Emerson Marcelina (penalty scored); Jonny Robert Do Nascimiento Torres (penalty missed); Christian Rutjens (penalty scored); Joseph Mbong (penalty scored); Ognjen Bjelicic (penalty missed) |

| 30 March 2024 | Mosta (1) | 2–2 (a.e.t.) (3–4 p) | Sliema Wanderers (1) | Paola |
| 16:30 CEST | Zachary Brincat 3'; Chidera Henry Nwoga 118' | | Lydon Micallef 78', 116' | Stadium: Tony Bezzina Stadium; Referee: Fyodor Zammit |
| | Penalties |
| | Precious Linus Tenebe (penalty missed); Jean Paul Farrugia (penalty scored); Sasha Cachia (penalty scored); Willie Britto (penalty scored); Nathan Agius (penalty missed) | | Mohamed Abdulahi Awad (penalty scored); Lydon Micallef (penalty scored); Neil Frendo (penalty scored); Gustavo Alcino (penalty scored); Geoffrey Edwin Acheampong (penalty missed) |

== Semi-finals ==
The draw for the semi-finals was held on 28 April 2024. The draws were held live on TVMSports by Malta FA Director of Football Operations Stephen Azzopardi together with Franco Degabriele Chief Commercial Officer of IZIBET. Two matches were played on 7 and 8 May, featuring the four quarter-final winners (four teams from the 2023–24 Maltese Premier League).

| 7 May 2024 | Floriana (1) | 2–2 (a.e.t.) (4–3 p) | Gzira United (1) | Ta' Qali |
| 19:00 CEST | Matías García 45+1'; Kemar Reid 49' | | Gabriel Bohrer 12'; Zachary Cassar 37' | Stadium: Ta' Qali National Stadium; Referee: Matthew De Gabriele |
| | Penalties |
| | Mattia Veselji (penalty scored); Jake Grech (penalty scored); Kemar Reid (penalty scored); Carlo Zammit Lonardelli (penalty scored); Nemanja Andrijanic (penalty scored) | | Gabriel Bohrer (penalty scored); Jackson Mendoza (penalty scored); Ewertton Jose Costa Silva (penalty scored); Thaylor Aldama (penalty missed); Thiago Espindola De Paula (penalty scored) |

| 8 May 2024 | Birkirkara (1) | 0–1 (a.e.t.) | Sliema Wanderers (1) | Ta' Qali |
| 19:00 CEST | | | Joseph Minala 116' (pen.) | Stadium: Ta' Qali National Stadium; Referee: Ishmael Barbara |

== Final ==
The final was played on 12 May. Floriana and Sliema Wanderers met in the Maltese FA Trophy final sixteen times back in 1935, 1936, 1938, 1945, 1949, 1953, 1955, 1956, 1958, 1965, 1972, 1974, 1979, 1993, 2017, and 2023. Between them in the finals, Floriana won nine times and Sliema Wanderers won six times. The last time Floriana and Sliema Wanderers met together in Maltese FA Trophy was during the 2016–17 season in the final when Floriana beat Sliema Wanderers by 2–0.

| 12 May 2024 | Floriana (1) | 0–0 (a.e.t.) (2–4 p) | Sliema Wanderers (1) | Ta' Qali |
| 16:00 CEST | | | | Stadium: Ta' Qali National Stadium; Referee: Fyodor Zammit |
| | Penalties |
| | Mattia Veselji (penalty missed); Jose Ulises Arias (penalty scored); Kemar Reid (penalty missed); Carlo Zammit Lonardelli (penalty scored) | | Geoffrey Edwin Acheampong (penalty scored); Mohamed Abdulahi Awad (penalty scored); Gustavo Alcino (penalty missed); Lydon Micallef (penalty scored); Joseph Minala (penalty scored) |

== Top scorers ==
As of 12 May 2024

| Rank | Player | Club | Goals |
|---|---|---|---|
| 1 | (Malta) Kemar Reid | Floriana | 4 |
| 1 | (Brazil) Andre Carlos Penha Da Costa | Melita | 4 |
| 3 | (Malta) Matías García | Floriana | 3 |
| 3 | (Malta) Gianluca Zammit | Gudja United | 3 |
| 3 | (Montenegro) Uroš Đuranović | Ħamrun Spartans | 3 |
| 3 | (Nigeria) Sunday Akinbule | Marsaxlokk | 3 |
| 3 | (Nigeria) Saint Ebisindor Christian | Mgarr United | 3 |
| 3 | (Nigeria) Victor Ifeanyi Mbata | Msida Saint-Joseph | 3 |
| 3 | (Serbia) Igor Nedeljkovic | Qala Saints | 3 |
| 3 | (Argentina) Federico Falcone | Valletta | 3 |

== Television rights ==
The following matches were broadcast live on TVMSports+:

| Round | TVMSports+ |
|---|---|
| Round of 32 | Mosta vs Pietà Hotspurs, Hibernians vs Qala Saints |
| Round of 16 | Gżira United vs Hibernians, Sliema Wanderers vs Balzan |
| Quarter-finals | Birkirkara vs Ħamrun Spartans |
| Semi-finals | Floriana vs Gzira United, Birkirkara vs Sliema Wanderers |
| Final | Floriana vs Sliema Wanderers |
