= Dommersen =

Dommersen is a surname. Notable people with the surname include:

- Cornelis Christiaan Dommersen (1842–1928), Dutch painter
- Pieter Cornelis Dommersen (1833–1918), Dutch painter active in England
- William Raymond Dommersen (1859–1927), English painter
