= Hulk (disambiguation) =

The Hulk is a superhero that appears in comic books published by Marvel Comics.

Hulk may also refer to:

== People ==
- Zach Banner (born 1993), American National Football League player nicknamed "the Hulk"
- Nico Hülkenberg, German Formula One race car driver nicknamed "the Hulk"
- Antonio Salazar (footballer) (1989–2022), Mexican footballer nicknamed "Hulk"
- Carlos Gabriel (born 1999), Brazilian football left-back also known as "Hulk"
- Hulk (footballer) (born 1986), Brazilian football winger Givanildo Vieira de Souza
- Johannes Frederik Hulk (1829–1911), Dutch painter, draftsman and photographer
- Abraham Hulk Senior (1813–1897), Dutch artist
- Hulk Hogan (1953–2025), American professional wrestler

== Arts and entertainment ==
- Hulk (film), a 2003 film by Ang Lee
  - Hulk (video game), a video game based on the 2003 film
- Hulk (Marvel Cinematic Universe character)
- Hulk Bryman, a fictional baseball player in the 2006 rhythm video game Elite Beat Agents

== Ships ==
- Hulk (ship type), a ship that is afloat but incapable of sailing
- Hulk (medieval ship type), an early European coastal craft type

== See also ==
- The Incredible Hulk (disambiguation)
- She-Hulk (disambiguation)
