= The Incredible Hulk (disambiguation) =

The Incredible Hulk is a fictional character of Marvel Comics.

The Incredible Hulk may also refer to:

== Comics ==
- The Incredible Hulk (comic book), the main Hulk comic series (1963–)
- The Incredible Hulk (comic strip), a comic strip based in the TV series (1978–1982)
- Hulk Comic or The Incredible Hulk Weekly, a comics anthology published by Marvel UK (1979–1980)

== Film ==
- The Incredible Hulk (film), a 2008 film starring Edward Norton
  - The Incredible Hulk (soundtrack)

== Television ==
- The Incredible Hulk (1978 TV series), a live-action TV series (1977–1982)
  - The Incredible Hulk: Original Soundtrack Recording (1999)
- The Incredible Hulk (1982 TV series), an animated TV series (1982–1983)
- The Incredible Hulk (1996 TV series), an animated TV series (1996–1997)
- "The Incredible Hulk", a segment from The Marvel Super Heroes (1966)

== Video games ==
- The Incredible Hulk (1994 video game)
- The Incredible Hulk (2003 video game)
- The Incredible Hulk (2008 video game)

== Other uses ==
- The Incredible Hulk (roller coaster), a roller coaster at Islands of Adventure in Orlando, Florida
- Incredible Hulk (cocktail), a green cocktail
- The Incredible Hulk (California), a summit in the Sierra Nevada, US

== See also ==
- Hulk (disambiguation)
- Hulk in other media
