= Lonely Man =

Lonely Man may refer to:

== Film and television ==
- The Lonely Man, a 1957 American film
- "The Lonely Man", a 1972 episode of Bonanza
- "The Lonely Man", the twenty-ninth episode of New York Confidential
- "The Lonely Man", a 2025 episode of Resident Alien

== Literature ==
- The Lonely Man, a 1932 novel by Gilbert Frankau
- The Lonely Man, a 1964 novel by Frank Baldwin

== Music ==
- A Lonely Man, a 1972 album by The Chi-Lites
- "The Lonely Man Theme", an instrumental musical theme from the 1978 TV series The Incredible Hulk

=== Songs ===
- "Lonely Man" (Elvis Presley song), a 1960 song by Elvis Presley
- "Lonely Man", a song by Splinter from the 1974 album The Place I Love
- "Lonely Man", a song by Status Quo from the 1974 album Quo
- "Lonely Man", a song by Audio Adrenaline from the 2001 album Lift
