= The Incredible Hulk (soundtrack) =

Film score by Craig Armstrong
- Released: June 13, 2008
- Recorded: April 2008
- Studio: Bastyr University Chapel
- Genre: Orchestra
- Length: 110:53
- Label: Marvel
- Producers: Craig Armstrong; David Donaldson

Craig Armstrong chronology
Elizabeth: The Golden Age (2007)	The Incredible Hulk (2008)	Wall Street: Money Never Sleeps (2010)

The Incredible Hulk is the soundtrack album for The Incredible Hulk, a 2008 American superhero film based on the Marvel Comics character the Hulk that was produced by Marvel Studios and Valhalla Motion Pictures. The album consists of an original film score composed by Craig Armstrong, and was released by Marvel Music on June 13, 2008.

Director Louis Leterrier convinced Marvel executives that Armstrong was the right choice, despite his lack of action film experience and them being unfamiliar with his work. Armstrong composed several themes, including a simple Hulk theme that he compared to John Williams's theme for the shark in the film Jaws (1975). Recording with the Northwest Sinfonia orchestra at Bastyr University Chapel in Kenmore, Washington, took place over just four days in April 2008. Leterrier insisted on a double CD album release so all of Armstrong's music could be made available, which was done through a limited agreement between Marvel and Amazon where the latter produced the albums on-demand.

Armstrong's score received generally positive responses, including for his Hulk theme and a reference to Joe Harnell's "The Lonely Man" theme from the series The Incredible Hulk (1977–1982). Some critics were positive about the double CD album release, but others found it a difficult listening experience due to the large amount of music.

== Background ==
The Incredible Hulk is an American superhero film based on the Marvel Comics character the Hulk. It was produced by Marvel Studios and Valhalla Motion Pictures, directed by Louis Leterrier, and written by Zak Penn. The film stars Edward Norton as Bruce Banner, who becomes the monstrous Hulk as an unwitting pawn in a military scheme to reinvigorate the "super soldier" program through gamma radiation; Banner goes on the run from the military while attempting to cure himself of the Hulk. Originally intended to be a follow-up to the 2003 film Hulk, which features a score by Danny Elfman, The Incredible Hulk was reworked after Norton was hired and became a reboot of the series that is part of the Marvel Cinematic Universe (MCU). The Incredible Hulk was released in the United States on June 13, 2008, as part of Phase One of the MCU.

Leterrier's first choice for composer was Craig Armstrong, who he had been a fan of since Armstrong was an arranger for the band Massive Attack in the 1990s; Massive Attack did the music for Leterrier's film Unleashed (2005). The director listened to Armstrong's music while developing The Incredible Hulk, and had to convince Marvel executives as they were surprised by the choice and unfamiliar with Armstrong's prior work. Armstrong said the project was different from his usual films, as he did not often score action, but he agreed to join because he was a fan of the Hulk as a child. Leterrier later stated that Norton was close friends with singer and songwriter Thom Yorke of Radiohead and wanted that band to create the music, while Marvel was pushing for a more traditional film score. Leterrier felt Armstrong was an "elegant in-between" due to his work with Massive Attack.

== Production ==
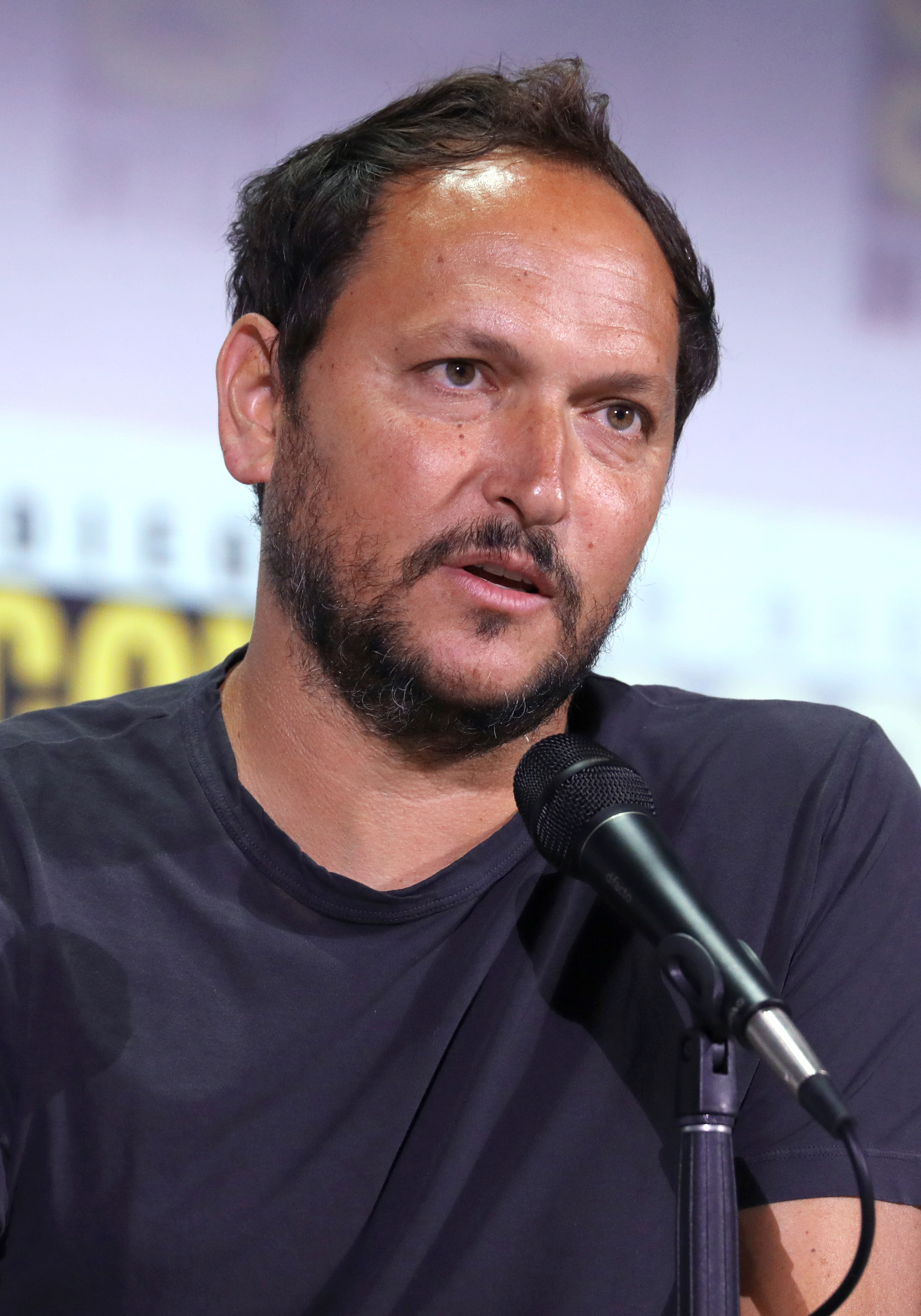
Director Louis Leterrier (pictured) convinced Marvel executives that composer Craig Armstrong was the right choice for The Incredible Hulk.

Music editor Peter Myles used Armstrong's previous music in the film's temp score. Armstrong chose not to listen to the temp score or watch the previous Hulk film. He began work from his home in Glasgow, Scotland, with three key sequences: the climactic fight between the Hulk and the Abomination; a romantic scene where Banner is reunited with Betty Ross; and the "grotto" scene where Hulk and Betty shelter from a storm. Armstrong said the foundations of the whole score came from these three scenes, with more aggressive action music for the Hulk, and different approaches to music for Betty when she is with Banner and Hulk. Leterrier initially planned to join Armstrong in Glasgow, but had to remain in Los Angeles to oversee the large amount of visual effects work. After several weeks, Armstrong moved to be closer to Leterrier, basing himself at Hans Zimmer's film scoring studio Remote Control Productions in Santa Monica.

Leterrier asked Armstrong for the score to be primarily orchestral because he felt electronic music would become dated too quickly. He also asked for the Hulk's theme to be simple and easily identifiable, so audiences "could whistle [it] coming out of the movie theater", and hoped that this would help win over Marvel executives. Armstrong aspired to create a simple theme that defined the Hulk and could become iconic, like John Williams's simple theme for the shark in the film Jaws (1975). Armstrong's Hulk theme features basses, cellos, and violas playing a C note with a glissando up an octave and then back down to the base note. Other themes that he composed for the film include: Banner's "lonely man" theme for when he is in human form, not to be confused with Joe Harnell's "The Lonely Man" theme from the series The Incredible Hulk (1977–1982); a love theme for Banner and Betty; a science theme for when the characters are investigating the nature of the Hulk; and two themes for Abomination, one when he is in his monstrous form and another for his human form as Emil Blonsky. Armstrong said there was a lot of interplay between the different themes, including pitting the Hulk and Abomination themes against each other when those two characters fight. His Banner theme is incapsulated in a track called "The Arctic", which was written for a planned opening scene where Banner goes to the Arctic to kill himself. The scene was cut from the film, but included as a deleted scene on the home media release.

Because recording with the orchestra was scheduled to take just four days, with little time for adjustments to be made, Armstrong created detailed demo tracks so Leterrier and the producers could ask for any changes and give their approval. Leterrier said these demos were the most important part of the scoring process. As Armstrong was working, the film's opening title sequence—depicting the origin story of how Banner becomes the Hulk and goes on the run—was being developed by Prologue Films. There was a back-and-forth between Armstrong and the team at Prologue, and the sequence was adjusted as Armstrong improved the music. Due to the large amount of music needed for the film, Armstrong was unable to orchestrate any of it himself. Matt Dunkley was the orchestrator for the score, and also conducted the 73-piece Northwest Sinfonia orchestra. Recording took place in late April 2008 at Bastyr University Chapel in Kenmore, Washington. Armstrong played the piano for some of the film, including for a moment where Harnell's "The Lonely Man" is quoted as an homage to the 1970s series. The score was mixed at Village Studios in Los Angeles, integrating electronic work from several programmers as well as various ethnic percussion instruments that were performed by Pete Lockett in London. Armstrong stated that Marvel executives praised his completed score, especially the Hulk theme.

== Release ==
During recording, Leterrier suggested that the full score be released on a double CD soundtrack album instead of the normal practice for film scores of releasing highlights on a single CD. He explained that the single CD practice often frustrated him as a film score fan, and he was so proud of Armstrong's music for this film that he wanted the full thing to be available. Armstrong thought Leterrier was joking and initially only provided Marvel with tracks for a single CD. They corrected him, and a double CD album featuring the full 110 minute score—including "The Arctic" and theme suites—was mastered. The album was made available on June 13, 2008, exclusively through Amazon's retail website as part of a limited agreement with Marvel Music where the albums were produced on-demand, an unusual approach which made the double CD release feasible.

== Critical response ==
Professional ratings
Review scores
Source	Rating
FilmMusic.com	2.5/5 stars
Filmtracks	4/5 stars
Movie Music UK	3.5/5 stars
Tracksounds	8/10 stars

Christopher Coleman at Tracksounds scored the album eight out of ten and praised Armstrong's work, which he found to be surprisingly good and one reason that he enjoyed the film. Coleman highlighted the Hulk theme alongside the other themes Armstrong wrote for the score, and said the composer excelled with the action tracks especially for the Hulk and Abomination fight at the end of the film. Christian Clemmensen of Filmtracks said the score was "interesting in all of its parts, brilliant in some while serviceable in others", with an approach that was almost too intelligent for the film considering some of the complexities of the themes do not come across clearly onscreen. He said the Hulk theme was the highlight of the music, gave the overall score four stars out of five, and said it was an improvement on Elfman's work for the previous Hulk film.

Movie Music UK's Jonathan Broxton said the music was generally good, particularly praising some of the action tracks, but said the album presentation was "a slog" to listen to in one sitting which reduced his rating to three-and-a-half stars out of five. Clemmensen said the full album "can become burdensome" but recommended fans buy it while they could. Writing for FilmMusic.com, Andrew Granade felt the album presentation was a good sign for future film score releases. He was more critical of the music, giving it two-and-a-half stars out of five and saying it "descends into common action tropes" and did not live up to Armstrong's more intelligent past scores. One exception he found was the reference to Harnell's "The Lonely Man", which Granade described as a "lovely arrangement" that differed from the rest of album's sound. Coleman, Clemmensen, and Broxton also noted the respectful reference to Harnell in their reviews.

Armstrong was included in the Top Box Office Films category at the 2009 ASCAP Film and Television Music Awards, which honors various composers of a year's most performed film music.

== Track listing ==
All music is composed by Craig Armstrong.

Disc one
No.	Title	Length
1.	"The Arctic"	2:46
2.	"Main Title"	2:38
3.	"Rocinha Favela"	3:11
4.	"A Drop of Blood"	1:35
5.	"The Flower"	2:49
6.	"Ross' Team"	1:33
7.	"Mr. Blue"	1:03
8.	"Favela Escape"	3:35
9.	"It Was Banner"	1:31
10.	"That Is the Target"	5:33
11.	"Bruce Goes Home"	1:24
12.	"Ross and Blonsky"	3:15
13.	"Return to Culver University"	2:38
14.	"The Lab"	1:16
15.	"Reunion"	3:37
16.	"The Data / The Vial"	1:20
17.	"They're Here"	3:06
18.	"Give Him Everything You've Got"	6:08
19.	"Bruce Can't Stay"	1:53
20.	"First Injection"	1:02
21.	"Is It Safe?"	1:06
22.	"Hulk Theme"	3:59
Total length:		56:58

Disc two
No.	Title	Length
1.	"Saved from the Flames"	0:53
2.	"Grotto"	2:53
3.	"Arrival at the Motel"	1:47
4.	"I Can't"	2:15
5.	"Abomination Alley"	3:56
6.	"They Found Bruce"	2:51
7.	"Bruce Looks for the Data"	1:05
8.	"Cab Ride in NYC"	1:17
9.	"The Mirror"	1:17
10.	"Stern's Lab"	4:16
11.	"Bruce Darted"	3:00
12.	"I Want It, I Need It"	1:35
13.	"Blonsky Transforms"	1:15
14.	"Bruce Must Do It"	2:11
15.	"Harlem Brawl"	3:50
16.	"Are They Dead?"	2:39
17.	"Hulk Smash"	2:24
18.	"Hulk and Betty"	1:49
19.	"A Tear"	1:00
20.	"Who's We?"	0:55
21.	"The Necklace"	1:44
22.	"Bruce and Betty"	5:05
23.	"Hulk Theme" (End Credits)	3:58
Total length:		53:55

Interpolations

- "Bruce Goes Home" includes an excerpt from "The Lonely Man" written by Joseph Harnell and performed by Craig Armstrong.

== Personnel ==
Credits adapted from the album's liner notes.

- Craig Armstrong – composer, score producer
- David Donaldson – score producer, programmer, engineer
- Louis Leterrier – executive score producer
- Kevin Feige – executive score producer
- Dave Jordan – executive score producer
- T.J. Lindgren – additional arranger, programmer
- Kaz Boyle – additional arranger, additional orchestrator, programmer
- Matt Dunkley – orchestrator, conductor
- Stephen Coleman – additional orchestrator
- Tony Blondal – additional orchestrator
- David Butterworth – additional orchestrator
- Scott Fraser – additional programmer ("Hulk Theme")
- Pete Lockett – ethnic percussion
- Audrey DeRoche – score supervisor
- Brad Haehnel – recording engineer, mixer
- Peter Myles – supervising music editor
- Patricia Sullivan Fourstar – mastering engineer
- Chris Fondacaro – art direction and design
- Tom Marvelli – art direction and design
- José Rey – art direction and design

== See also ==
- Music of the Marvel Cinematic Universe
