= Cornelis Christiaan Dommersen =

Dutch painter (1842–1928)

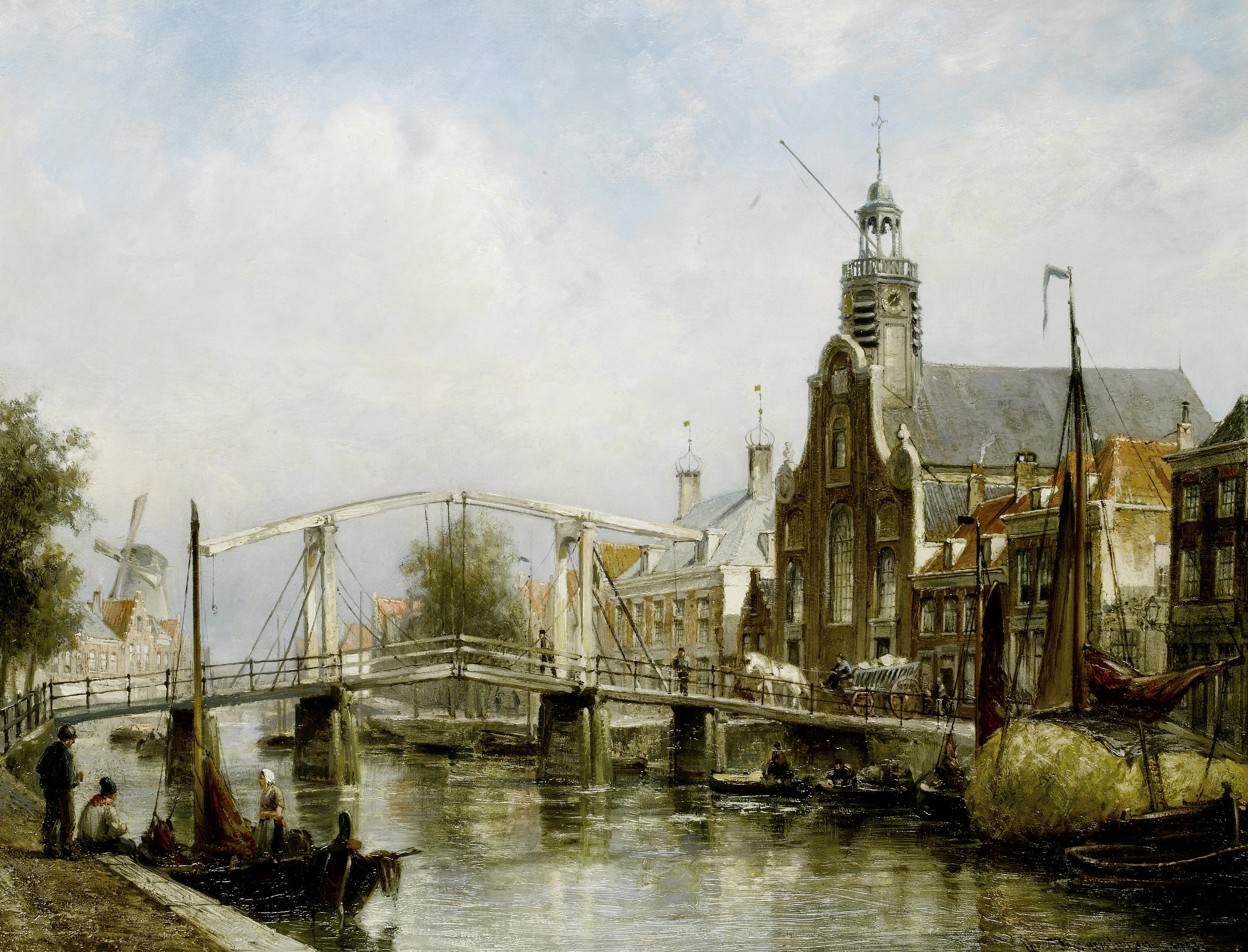
Painting by Dommersen

Cornelis Christiaan Dommersen (Dommershuijzen), ( Utrecht, 11 November 1842 – The Hague, 23 May 1928) was a Dutch painter and watercolourist. He signed his work as C.C. Dommershuizen, Chr. Dommelshuizen, Christian Dommelshuizen and C. Dommersen.

== Family ==
The spelling of the Dutch family name is rather complicated as it is spelled in many different ways such as Dommelshuizen, Dommershuizen, Dommershuyzen, Dommershuijzen, Dommerson, with occasionally the Dutch prefix 'van'. Pre 1700 the family came from Dahlheim, near Koblenz, in Germany, so their family name was originally 'Dommershausen'. Although the paintings are usually signed as Dommersen. Cornelis Christiaan's older brother was Pieter Cornelis Dommersen (1833-1918), who was also born in Utrecht. Pieter Cornelis was a painter as well, gaining more fame than his younger brother. Both were illegitimate sons of Cornelia Dommershuitzen . In around 1850 Pieter Cornelis Dommersen moved to England and stayed there till his death in Hexham in 1918. Pieter Cornelis Dommersen had a son called William Raymond Dommersen (1859-1927), who also became a painter in England.

Cornelis Christiaan specialized just like his brother in sea -and river scapes and coastal scenery as those paintings had found a revival during the 19th century in Europe. He traveled abroad to countries such as England, America, Belgium and France, just like his countryman Abraham Hulk Senior did. However, in the end he found satisfaction painting not only river- and seascapes in the Netherlands but also the interior of villages and towns along the rivers. On his travels, he was often accompanied by his brother and his nephew. He appears to have been married twice without issue.

He married twice, first in The Hague Henriette Johanna Philippo, who was born c. 1852 in Amsterdam. He married 2nd in The Hague 26 May 1904 Carolina Maria Fredrica de Geus, who was born in Houtrijk en Polanen on 24 April 1852. Both marriages seem to have been childless.

== Exhibitions and Museums ==
His work was exhibited in Amsterdam, The Hague and Rotterdam. His work can be found in the museums of Amsterdam, The Hague, Rotterdam and Utrecht, as well as Cleveland, Ohio.

== Gallery ==
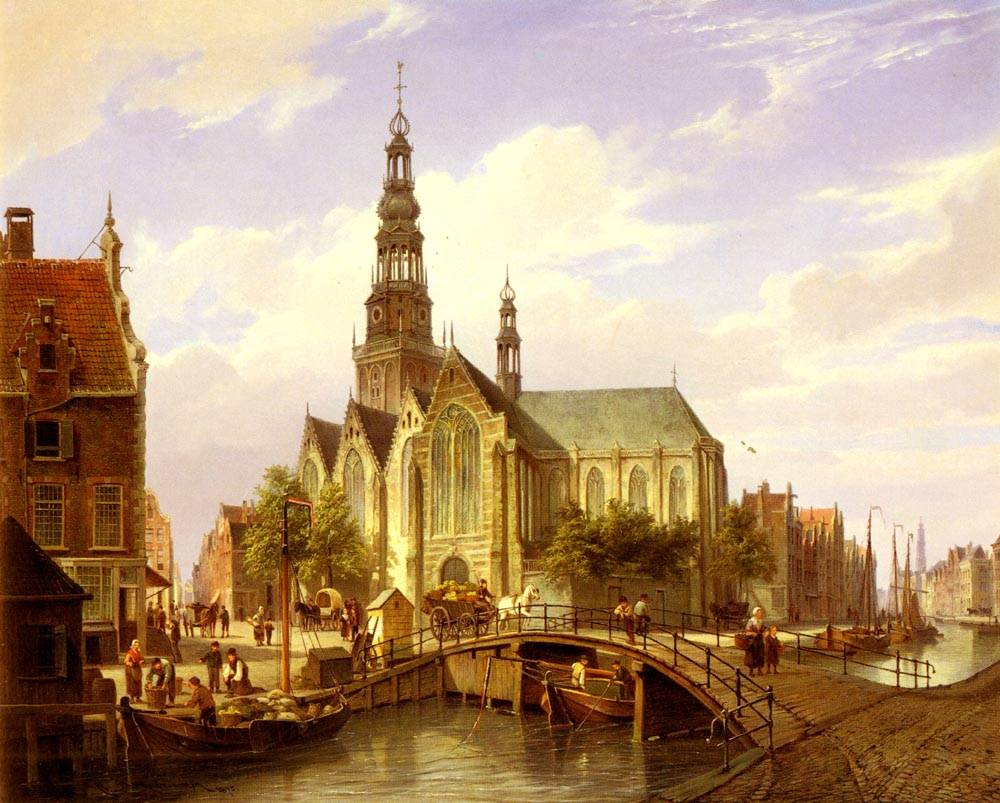
Painting by Dommersen of Amsterdam

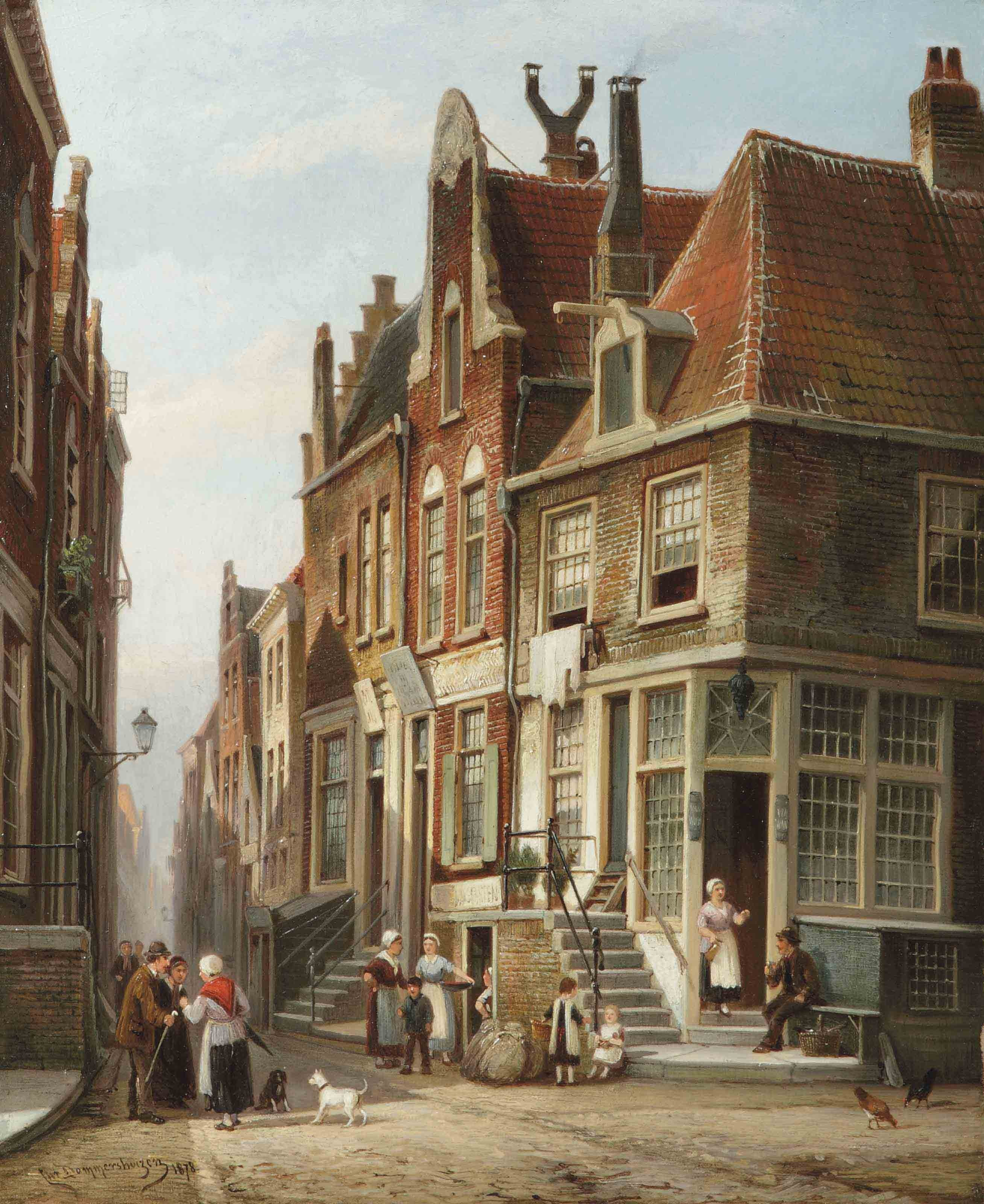
Jewish quarter in Amsterdam by Dommersen

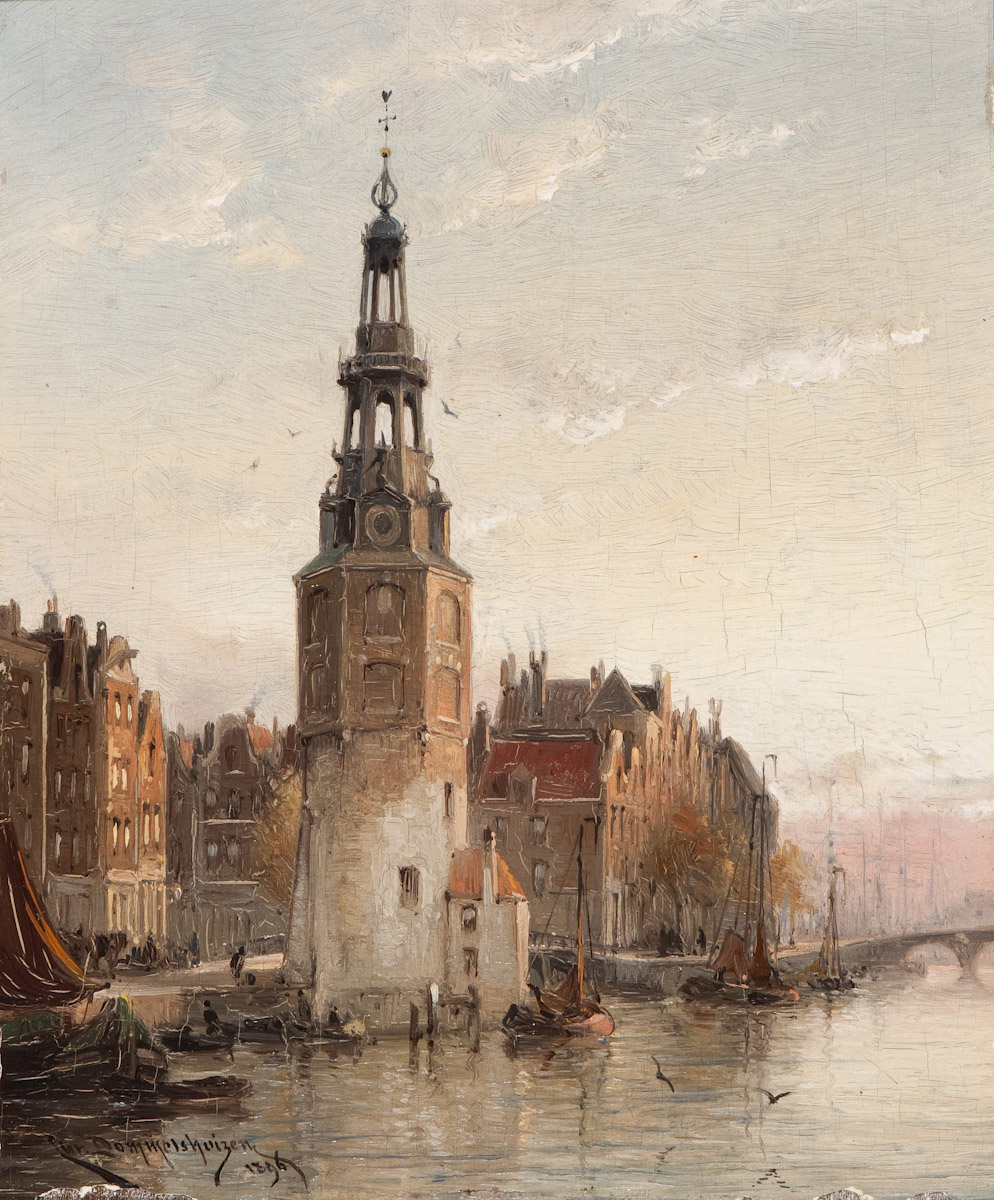
The Montelbaanstower in Amsterdam

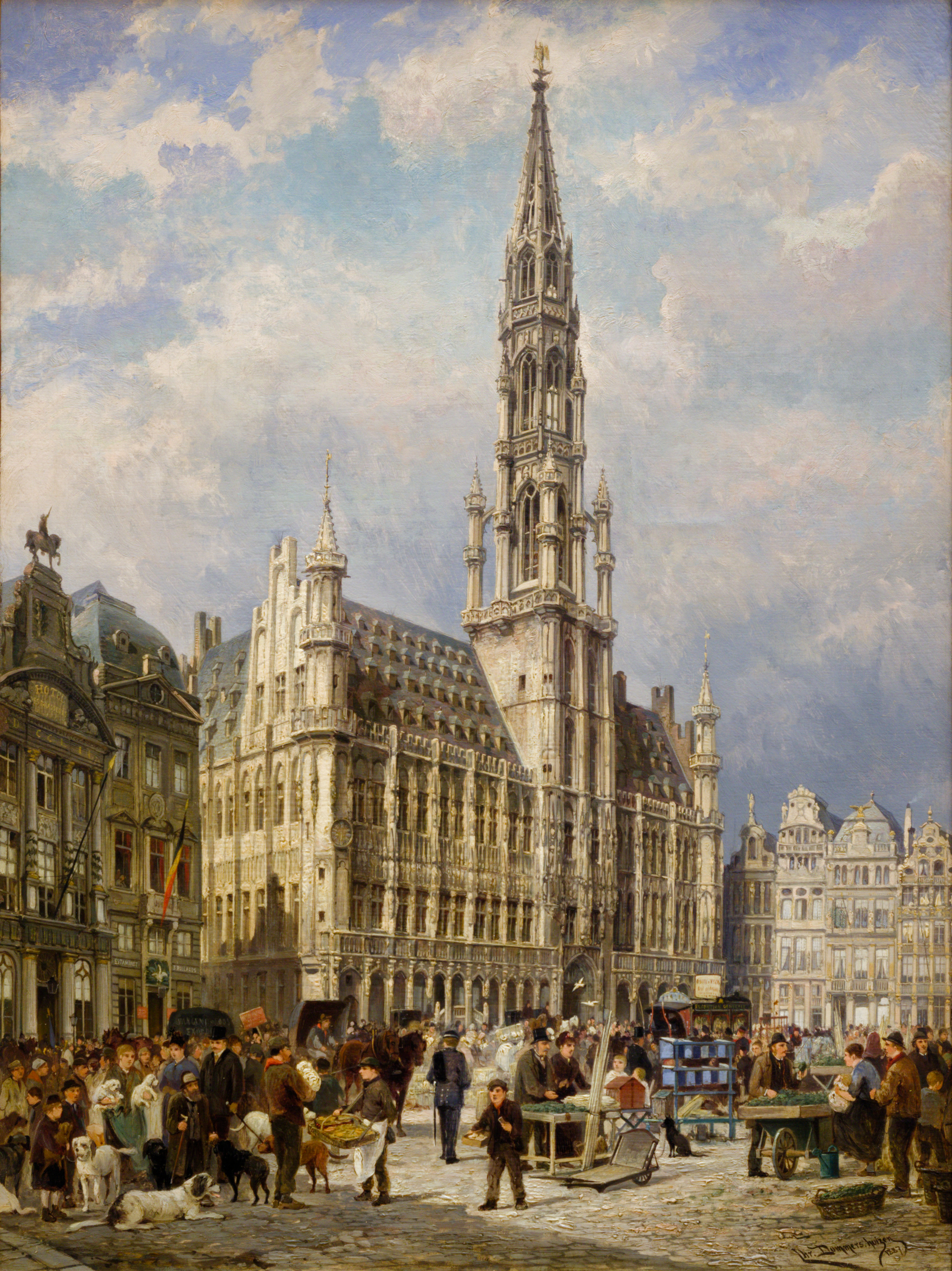
Brussels city hall and Sunday market
