= She-Hulk (disambiguation) =

She-Hulk is a Marvel Comics character; the first iteration is the alter ego of Jennifer Walters.

She-Hulk may also refer to:

- Jennifer Walters (Marvel Cinematic Universe), the character as portrayed in the Marvel Cinematic Universe (MCU)
  - She-Hulk: Attorney at Law, a MCU Disney+ series featuring the Walters character
- She-Hulk (Lyra), the second character to hold the mantle
- Betty Ross, the third character to hold the mantle

== See also ==
- Shulk, the protagonist of the video game Xenoblade Chronicles
- Hulk (disambiguation)
