= Pieter Cornelis Dommersen =

Dutch painter

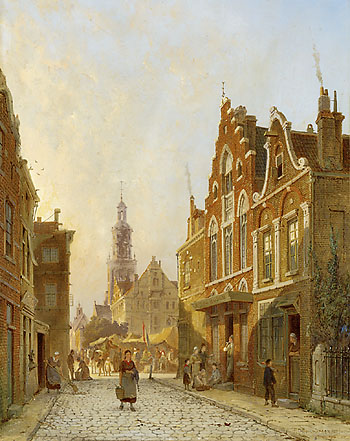
Painting made by Dommersen in 1889

Pieter Cornelis Dommersen, born as Dommershuisen, (6 December 1833 – 18 November 1918) was a Dutch painter and watercolourist active in England. He is also known as Pieter Cornelis Dommershuijzen and signed his work as P.C. Dommersen, P.C.Dommershuisen, or P.C. Dommershuizen.

== Family ==
Dommerson was born 6 December 1833 in the city of Utrecht, Netherlands as Pieter Cornelis Dommershuisen, illegitimate son of Cornelia Dommershuisen. Pre 1700 the family came from Dahlheim, near Koblenz, in Germany, so their family name was originally 'Dommershausen'. He was the elder brother of the painter Cornelis Christiaan Dommersen. Pieter Cornelis moved from the Netherlands to England in around 1855. He married Trinity Church, Marylebone, Middlesex on 29 January 1859 Anna Petronella Synja (Sijnja), born Amsterdam c. 1838, da. of Dr. (Medicine) Louis Synja and N.N. They had at least two sons and one daughter. His son William Raymond Dommersen (Dommerson) (1859-1927) also became a fine art artist in England, all three Dommersens painting the same genre of paintings.

== Biography ==
Dommersen specialist in sea-, land- and river-scapes as during the 19th century there seems to have been a revival of this type of art. He travelled and painted in America, Belgium, The Netherlands, Britain and France just like his countryman Abraham Hulk Senior did and also settled in the end in the United Kingdom. He often travelled together with his brother Cornelis Christiaan Dommersen and his son William Raymond Dommersen.

He died in Hexham in the last quarter of 1918 as Peter C. Dommershuizen and was buried as Peter Cornelius Dommerverschingen on 18 November 1918 in Haydon Bridge which is recorded by Tim Williams on the Hexham Local History Society forum. His wife Anna Dommerson was buried there on 2 March 1918 and the address for both of them is given as Hadrian Bungalow, Hexham.

His works were exhibited at the Royal Academy, Royal Society of British Artist, the Suffolk Street Galleries and the British Institution.

Works of Dommersen are present in many museums such as Amsterdam, The Hague, Rotterdam, Utrecht and many museums in the United Kingdom.
