= Johannes Frederik Hulk =

Dutch painter

Johannes Frederik Hulk Sr.
- Born: 9 January 1829; Amsterdam, Netherlands
- Died: 12 June 1911 (aged 82); Haarlem, Netherlands
- Known for: Painting, drawing, photography
- Spouses: Hermine Cornelie Auguste Mulder; Margaritha Bakker

Johannes Frederik Hulk Sr. (9 January 1829 – 12 June 1911) was a Dutch painter, draftsman, photographer, and owner of a paint supplies store.

== Life and work ==
Hulk was born in Amsterdam in 1829. He was the youngest son of the merchant Hendrik Hulk and his English wife Mary Burroughs. He received painting lessons from his older brother Abraham and from Kasparus Karsen. As a painter he mainly painted landscapes, seascapes, cities, villages, and harbors. He gave painting lessons to his son Johannes Frederik "John" Hulk Jr., and to Bernard de Hoog, Bertha Müller, and Elias Stark. He was a member of the artists' society Arti et Amicitiae in Amsterdam.

Hulk was not only a painter, but also a draftsman and owned a painting and drawing supplies store, De Rembrandt ("The Rembrandt"), on the Rokin in Amsterdam. After the advent of photography, he trained himself in this new discipline. Together with his partner, Pieter Vlaander, he ran a photographic studio called Rembrandt, also on the Rokin. They worked together as the photographic studio Hulk & Vlaander until 1867. They also opened a studio on the Geldersekade in Rotterdam.

Hulk lived and worked most of his life in Amsterdam and in the nearby Sloten. After 1901 he lived successively in Vreeland, Abcoude and Haarlem. Hulk was married twice. From his first marriage to Hermine Cornelie Auguste Mulder, he had a daughter Betsy (1853–1903) and a son John. After the death of his first wife in 1866, he married his housekeeper Margaritha Bakker in 1868 in Muiden. He died in 1911 in Haarlem. He is buried at the family cemetery in Muiderberg.

== Gallery ==
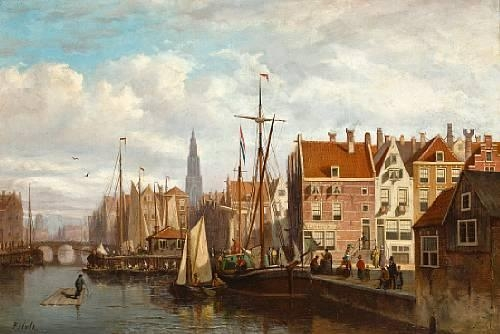
A view of Amsterdam, c. 1880

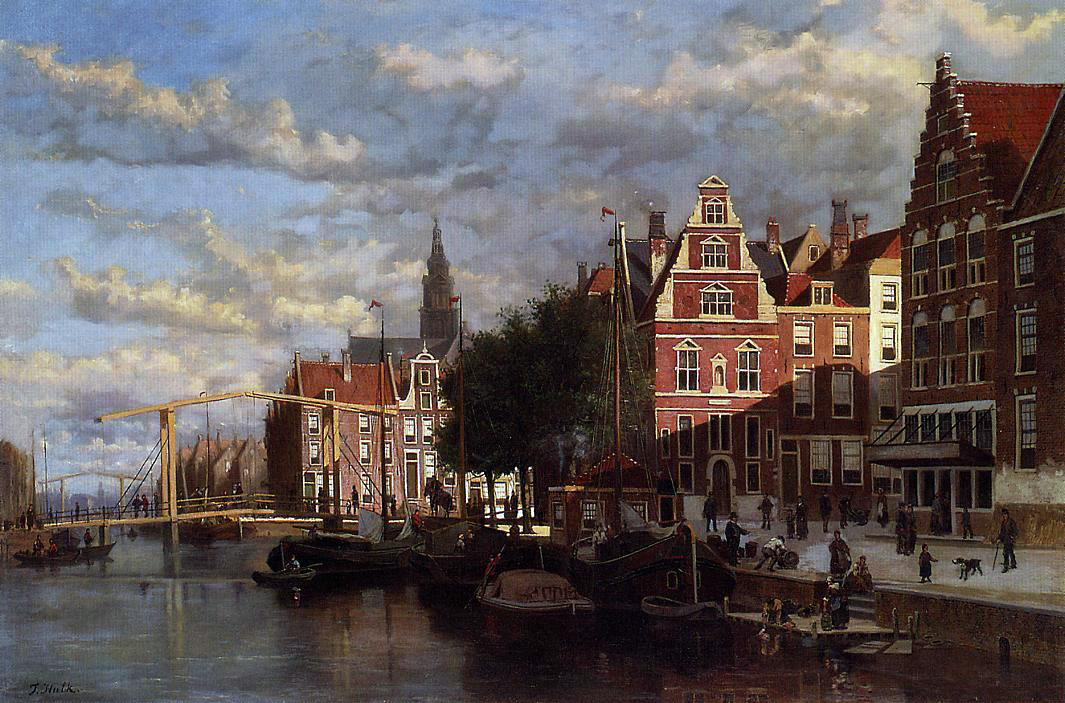
A canal in Amsterdam, c. 1880

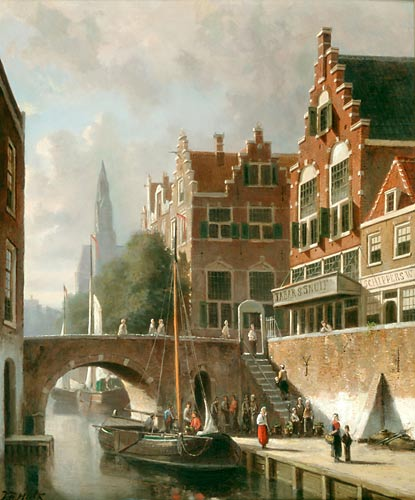
A canal in Amsterdam, c. 1880

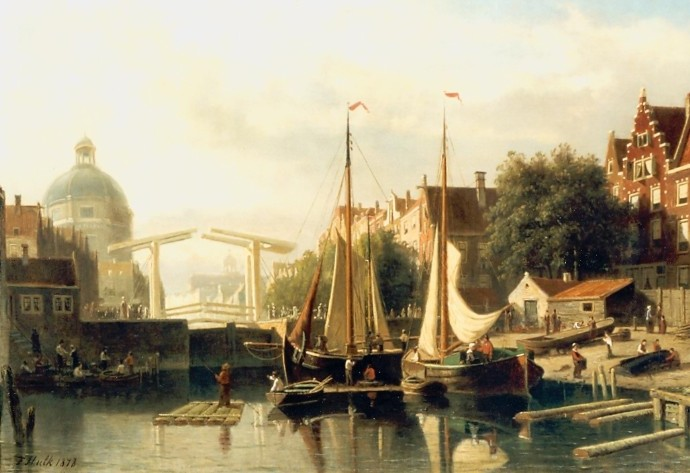
View of Amsterdam's inner harbor, c. 1880

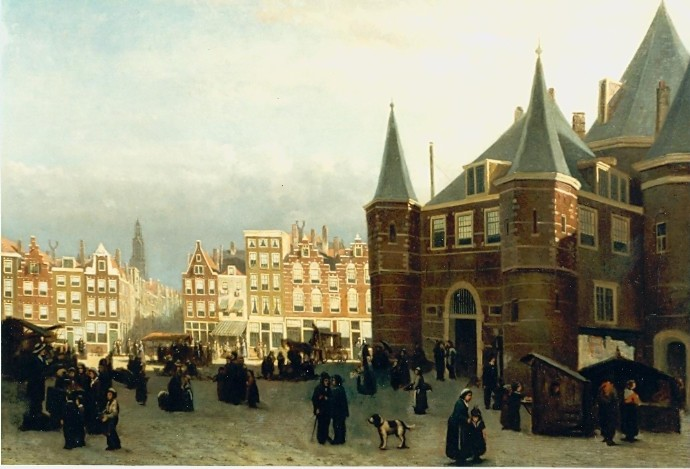
Market day outside the Waag on the Nieuwmarkt, Amsterdam, c. 1880

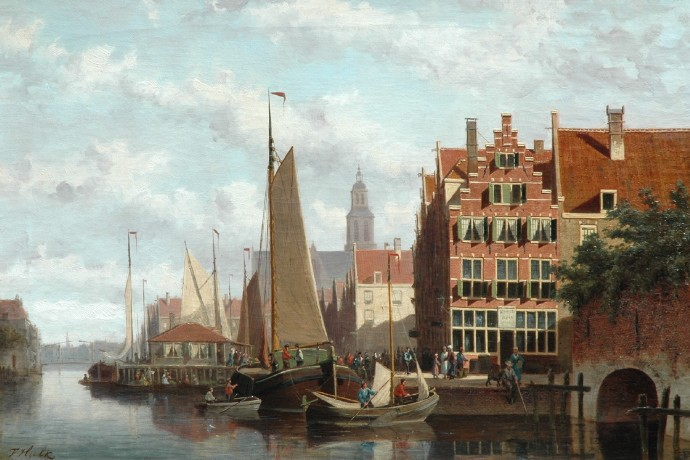
Moored barges unloading, oil on canvas, c. 1880

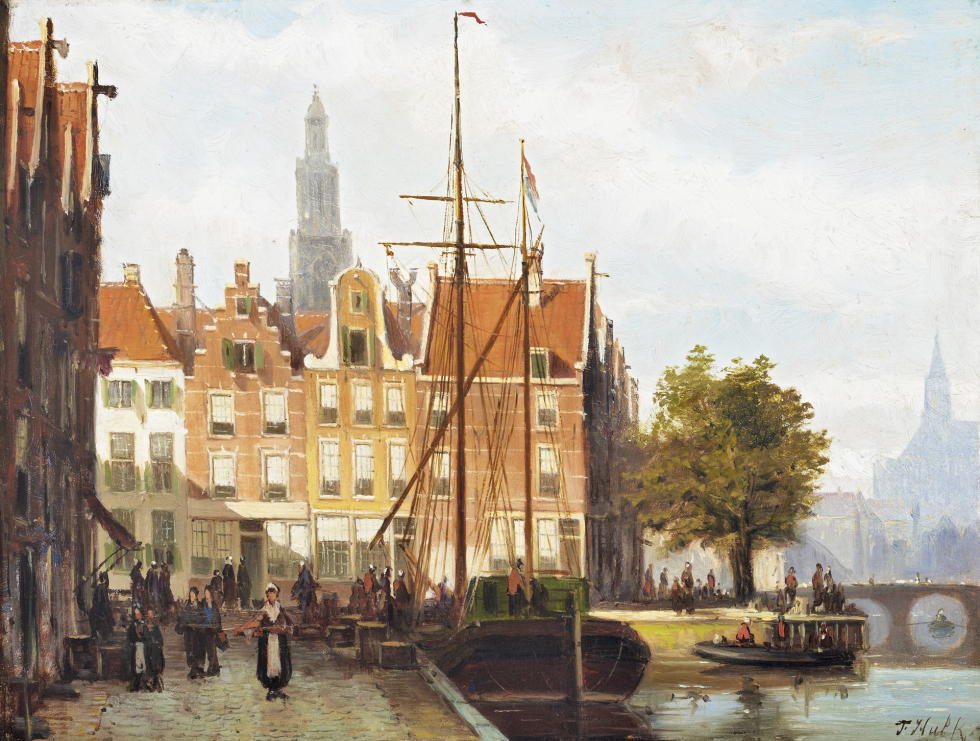
A view of the Spaarne, Haarlem, c. 1880

== Exhibitions ==
Hulk held exhibitions of his photographic work at the Paleis voon Volksvlijt ("Palace of Industry") in Amsterdam in 1865, and in the Prentenkabinet ("Print Room") at the University of Leiden.
