= Sunday Akinbule =

Nigerian footballer

Personal information
- Full name: Ayonfe Sunday Akinbule
- Date of birth: 27 October 1996 (age 30)
- Place of birth: Lagos, Nigeria
- Height: 1.89 m (6 ft 2 1/2 in)
- Position: Forward

Team information
- Current team: Hibernians
- Number: 88

Youth career
- –2015: Gateway United

Senior career*
Years	Team	Apps	(Gls)
2016–2017	Farense	20	(2)
2017–2018	Sertanense	25	(10)
2018–2019	Felgueiras	16	(4)
2019	Sertanense	11	(11)
2019	Hapoel Ra'anana	0	(0)
2019–2020	Al-Washm	7	(2)
2021–2022	Spartaks Jūrmala	0	(0)
2021	→ Shakhtyor Soligorsk (loan)	3	(0)
2021–2022	→ Mosta (loan)	21	(11)
2023–2024	Marsaxlokk	24	(9)
2024–2025	Prishtina	14	(3)
2025	Al Akhdar	10	(4)
2026–	Hibernians	10	(0)
- * Club domestic league appearances and goals as of 18 May 2026

Ayonfe Sunday Akinbule, known as Sunday Akinbule (born 27 October 1996), is a Nigerian football player who plays for Maltese Premier League club Hibernians.

== Club career ==
He made his professional debut in the Segunda Liga for Farense on 7 February 2016 in a game against Mafra.
