= Carlo Zammit Lonardelli =

Maltese footballer

Personal information
- Date of birth: 29 April 2001 (age 25)
- Height: 1.81 m (5 ft 11 in)
- Position: Central midfielder

Team information
- Current team: Floriana
- Number: 21

Youth career
- –2020: Birkirkara

Senior career*
Years	Team	Apps	(Gls)
2018–2020	Birkirkara	2	(0)
2020	Zrinski Jurjevac		
2020–2021	Fidelis Andria	3	(0)
2021	→ Arzachena (loan)	0	(0)
2021–2022	Sirens	26	(2)
2022–	Floriana	77	(9)

International career^{‡}
2017	Malta U17	3	(0)
2018–2019	Malta U19	10	(1)
2020–2022	Malta U21	13	(0)
2024–	Malta	10	(0)
- * Club domestic league appearances and goals as of 7 May 2026 ‡ National team caps and goals as of 20:00, 12 November 2026 (UTC)

Carlo Zammit Lonardelli (born 29 April 2001) is a Maltese football player who plays as a central midfielder for Floriana and the Malta national team.

== International career ==
Zammit Lonardelli made his debut for the senior Malta national team on 21 March 2024 in a friendly 2–2 draw against Slovenia.
