= William Raymond Dommersen =

English painter

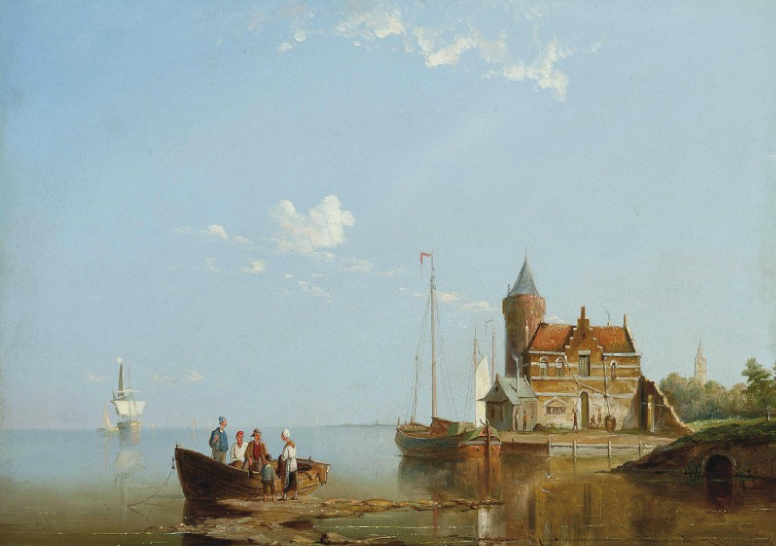
Fisherfolk at the water's edge on a still day, 1884”

William Raymond Dommersen, also Dommersheusen and Dommersheuzen, (London, Stratford West Ham, 1859 – London, 1927) was an English painter of Land- and Seascapes, Villages and Towns. He signed his work as W or WR Dommersen.

== Biography ==
Dommersen was born at the end of 1859 in Stratford, West Ham, London as the son of the Anglo / Dutch fine art painter Pieter Cornelis Dommersen and Anna Petronella Synja. His parents had moved from the Netherlands in 1855 to London, England. Pre 1700 the family came from Dahlheim, near Koblenz, in Germany, so their family name was originally 'Dommershausen'. He married c. 1887 Annie Louisa Gormer and had at least four sons and two daughters of whom there are descendants living in England and Scotland. His uncle, Cornelis Christiaan Dommersen, was also a painter in the Netherlands. It is possible that when his father received British nationality that they changed their family name – Dommershuizen – into the more English sounding surname Dommersen / Dommerson. Dommersen's grandmother, Cornelia Dommershuizen and his Uncle, Thomas Hendrik Dommershuizen (Dommersen) were both portrayed by the famous Anglo/ Dutch painter Sir Lawrence Alma-Tadema in 1862.

Dommersen painted between 1875 and 1927 genre pieces, landscapes, marine scenes, village- and town-scenes of quality. His best known works are the European villages and towns along rivers and canals. He painted mostly in the Netherlands and England but visited also, often with his father and uncle, Belgium, France and Italy. His work such as view on the Canal Grande in Venice, river views in the Thames and Windsor Castle are well known. At some stage he lived in Royal Tunbridge Wells Kent, which was strategically placed for his travels to Europe. Whilst living in Royal Tunbridge Wells he painted The Pantiles there. He had an only brother, William Daniel Dommerson, who was born Stratford, London, c. 1860, but died before 1871. William Raymond Dommersen died in 1927 in London.
