= Joe Harnell =

American composer, pianist, and arranger (1924–2005)

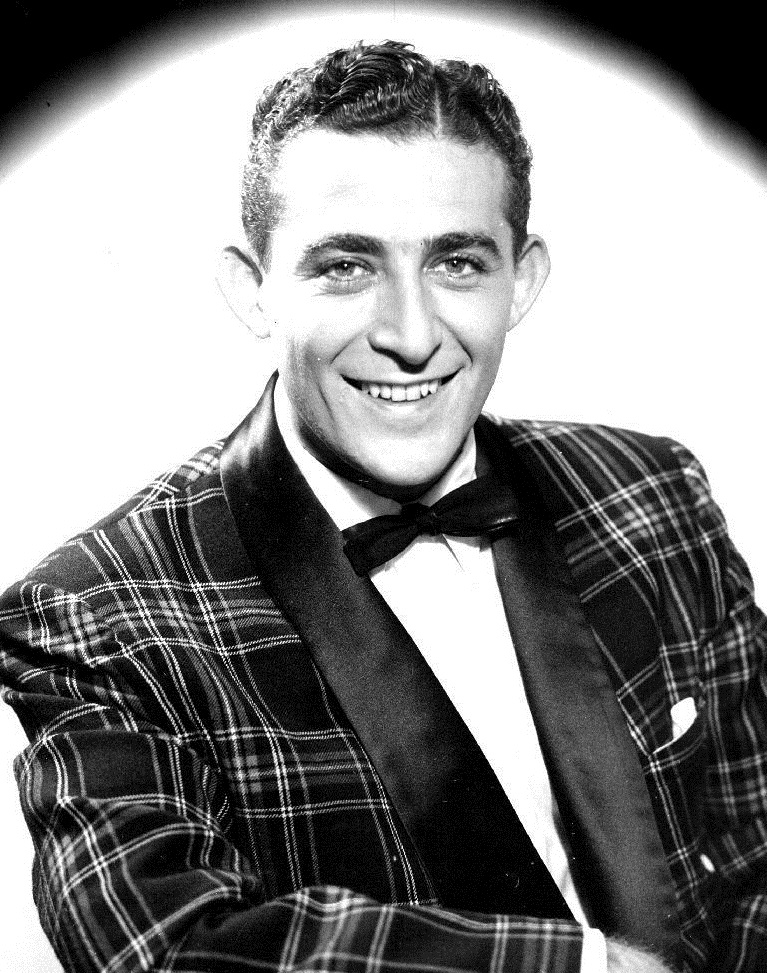
- Harnell in 1977

Background information
- Born: Joseph Hittelman; August 2, 1924; The Bronx, New York, U.S.
- Died: July 14, 2005 (aged 80) Sherman Oaks, California, U.S.
- Genres: Film score, jazz, pop music
- Occupations: Composer; musician; music arranger
- Instrument: Piano
- Years active: 1930s–2002

Joseph Harnell (born Joseph Hittelman; August 2, 1924 – July 14, 2005) was an American composer, musician, and music arranger.

== Early life ==
His father was a vaudeville performer who also played in jazz and klezmer ensembles. Harnell began playing piano at age six and was performing in his father's ensembles by age 14. He attended the University of Miami on a music scholarship in the early 1940s, and in 1943 joined the United States Army Air Forces, playing with Glenn Miller's Army Air Forces Band. He studied with Nadia Boulanger when stationed in Paris and then under William Walton at Trinity College of Music in London. After his discharge in 1946, he studied at Tanglewood under Aaron Copland and Leonard Bernstein.

== Music career ==
Eschewing the art-music world, Harnell sought work in pop and jazz, working as a for-hire pianist after returning to New York City in 1950. He played in Lester Lanin's band at this time and found work as an accompanist for singers such as Judy Garland, Maurice Chevalier, and Marlene Dietrich. From 1958 to 1961, he was Peggy Lee's full-time accompanist and arranger for the albums Anything Goes: Cole Porter and Peggy Lee & the George Shearing Quartet. In 1962, he was hurt in a car crash, and while he recovered, Kapp Records asked him to work on writing potential hits in the then-hot genre of bossa nova. Harnell's biggest success was with his arrangement of "Fly Me to the Moon", which was a hit in the US in 1963 (number 14 Pop, number 4 AC) and which won a Grammy Award for Best Pop Instrumental Performance. The song also peaked at number 6 in Harnell's hometown, on WMCA in New York, on January 16, 1963. The album from which it was taken went to number 3 on the Billboard 200. Harnell went on to release nearly 20 easy listening albums, on Kapp, Columbia, and Motown among others.

Harnell was also an integral part of The Dinah Shore Chevy Show as the "house pianist" on many episodes. Often at the end of a show Shore would gather round Harnell at the piano and she and her guests that evening would make requests of him for a song they wanted to sing. Some of those guests were John Raitt, Gisele MacKenzie, and very often, Janet Blair. It was a low-key and warm way to conclude the show. The show ran on NBC from October 1956 to June 1963.

Starting in 1964, Harnell worked with Grey Advertising as a jingle writer, and from 1967 to 1973, he worked as musical director of The Mike Douglas Show. In 1973, Harnell moved to Hollywood and worked in film score and television composition, composing for The Bionic Woman; The Incredible Hulk, including "The Lonely Man Theme" with which all episodes of The Incredible Hulk ended, playing over David Bruce Banner walking down yet another lonely road; Alien Nation; and V, for which he received an Emmy nomination in 1983. Harnell also wrote the famous signature tune for the United Artists logo introducing United Artists movies in the early 1980s, during the MGM merger with United Artists, as well as the theme music for the NBC daytime soap Santa Barbara. Following this he became a faculty member at USC's Thornton School of Music as an instructor in film score composition.

== Personal life ==
Harnell self-published an autobiography entitled Counterpoint in 2000, co-authored with television producer/director Ira Skutch. Harnell's first marriage was to Winnifred Selak, a tap dancer from Canada.

Harnell and his family had been residents of Teaneck, New Jersey.

His son, Jess Harnell, is a voice actor and singer, best known as the voice of Wakko Warner on the Steven Spielberg-produced animated television series Animaniacs, Crash Bandicoot in the Crash Bandicoot franchise, and the announcer of America's Funniest Home Videos, which he has announced since 1998.

His youngest son, Jason, is a jazz drummer and educator who has performed, recorded and toured with many jazz musicians, including Maynard Ferguson.

Joe's grandson, Jeremy, is a composer and visual artist working under the name JC Harnell (a.k.a. Sons of Wolves), and a 2011 winner of the Peoples Music Award for Best Abstract/Experimental Artist.

== Death ==
Harnell died on July 14, 2005, in Sherman Oaks, California, at the age of 80. His cause of death was heart failure.

== Discography ==
=== As a leader ===
- The Piano Inventions of Jo Harnell [sic] (Jubliee, 1955)
- The World's Greatest Love Themes (Epic, 1959)
- I Want to Be Happy (Epic, 1960)
- Fly Me to the Moon and the Bossa Nova Pops (Kapp, 1963)
- More Bossa Nova Pops (Kapp, 1963)
- The Piano Brilliance Of Joe Harnell (Epic, 1963)
- The Rhythm and the Fire (Kapp, 1965)
- Golden Piano Hits (Columbia, 1966)
- Bossa Now! (Columbia, 1967)
- Moving On!! (Motown, 1969)
- Harnell (Capitol, 1977)
- V (Original Soundtrack Recording) (Super Tracks Music Group, 1998)
- The Incredible Hulk: Original Soundtrack Recording (Super Tracks Music Group, 1999)

=== Compilations ===
- The Best of Joe Harnell (Kapp, 1966)
- The Film Music of Joe Harnell (Five Jays, 1992)

=== Sideman appearances ===
- Janis Martin: The Female Elvis: Complete Recordings 1956-60 (Bear Family reissue, 1987)
- Peggy Lee: Things Are Swingin' (Capitol, 1958)
- Fay DeWitt: Through Sick and Sin (Epic, 1961)
- Peggy Lee: Olé ala Lee! (Capitol, 1961)
- Peggy Lee: Basin Street East Proudly Presents Miss Peggy Lee (Capitol, 1961)
- Blossom Dearie: Sings Rootin' Songs (Hires, 1963)
