= Carlos Gabriel =

Brazilian footballer (born 1999)

Personal information
- Full name: Carlos Gabriel Moreira de Oliveira
- Date of birth: 3 April 1999 (age 27)
- Place of birth: Brasília, Brazil
- Height: 1.79 m (5 ft 10 1/2 in)
- Position: Left-back

Team information
- Current team: St. Lucia
- Number: 22

Youth career
- 2012: Bahia
- 2012–2014: Fluminense
- 2015–2019: Atlético Mineiro

Senior career*
Years	Team	Apps	(Gls)
2018–2020	Atlético Mineiro	6	(0)
2020	→ Paraná (loan)	0	(0)
2020–2022	Porto B	17	(1)
2023	Cianorte	2	(0)
2023	Anápolis FC	8	(0)
2023–	St. Lucia	13	(0)
- * Club domestic league appearances and goals as of 11 March 2024

Carlos Gabriel Moreira de Oliveira (born 3 April 1999), commonly known as Carlos Gabriel or Hulk, is a Brazilian footballer who plays as a left-back for Maltese side St. Lucia. He is nicknamed Hulk due to his physical resemblance to the international player.

== Career statistics ==
=== Club ===
As of 6 September 2018.

Club	Season	League			Cup		Continental		State League		Other		Total	
Club	Season	Division	Apps	Goals	Apps	Goals	Apps	Goals	Apps	Goals	Apps	Goals	Apps	Goals
Atlético Mineiro	2018	Série A	3	0	—		—		—		—		3	0
Career total			3	0	0	0	0	0	0	0	0	0	3	0
