= Abraham Hulk Senior =

English painter

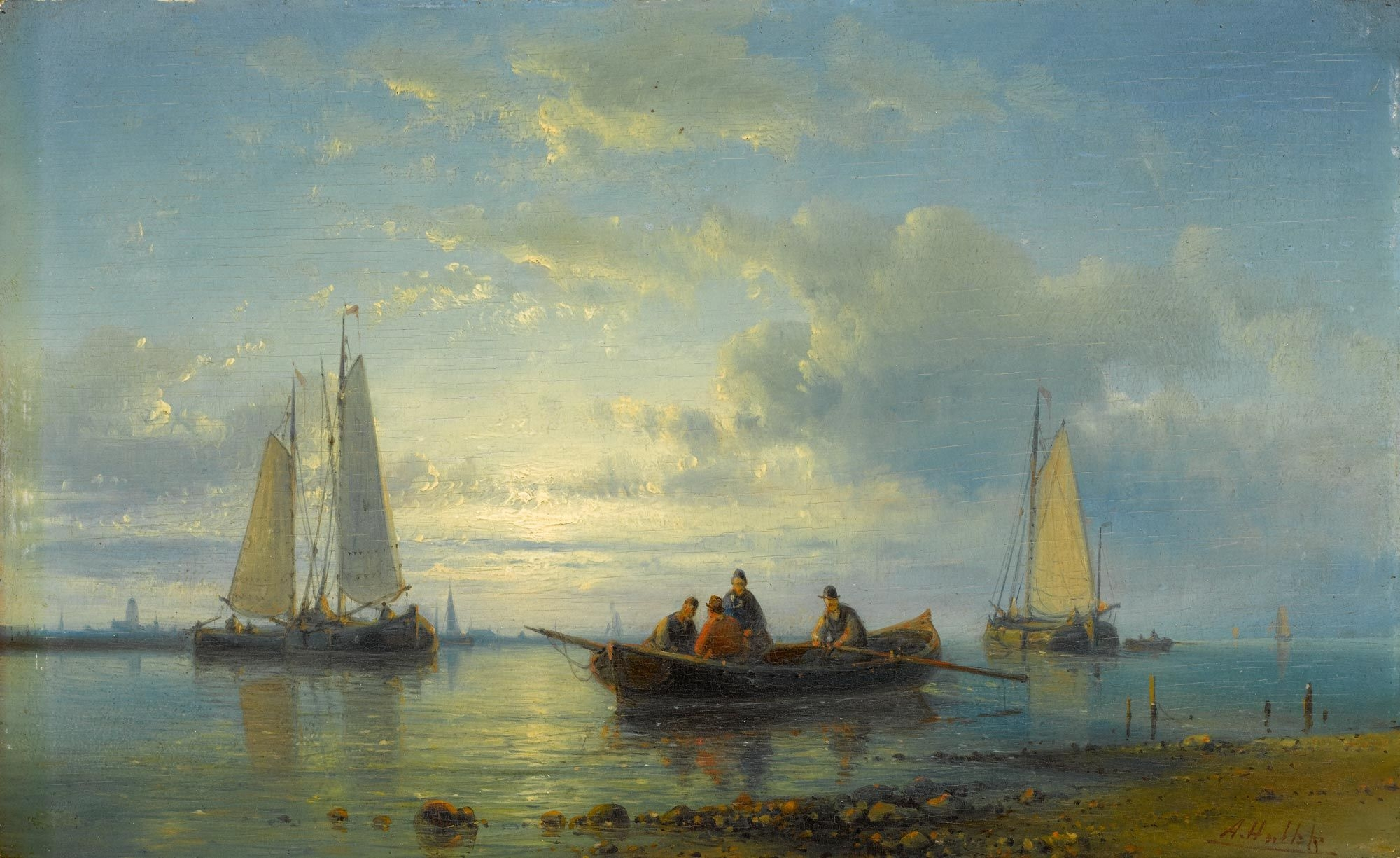
Painting by Abraham Hulk the Elder

Abraham Hulk Senior (1 May 1813 in London – 23 March 1897 in Zevenaar) was an Anglo-Dutch painter, draughtsman and lithographer. He initially trained as a portraitist, but became a well known as a marine-painter and the patriarch of a whole family of Anglo-Dutch artists.

== Biography ==
Hulk was born in London, the son of the merchant Hendrik Hulk and Mary Burroughs. He trained as a portrait painter under Jean Augustin Daiwaille (1786–1850) before continuing his artistic education at the Rijksacademie in Amsterdam.

During 1833 and 1834 he travelled to America, visiting New York and Boston, and exhibiting in the latter city. In 1834 he returned to Amsterdam, where he lived until 1855, when he relocated to Nijkerk, later moving to Enkhuizen, then to Haarlem, back to Amsterdam, then to Oosterbeek, before returning to Amsterdam once more. In 1870 he settled in England, where he spent the rest of his life. He became well known because he seemed to have the ability to paint the sea and its ships in such a different way for which he became one of the great marine painters. Some of his portraits have survived. His work was exhibited in the Royal Academy in London from 1876 to 1890 where he entered three paintings of which two were Dutch seascapes. He also exhibited at the Suffolk Street Galleries in London and in Leeuwarden and The Hague in the Netherlands from 1843 to 1868.

== Family ==
Other painters in his family included his younger brother Johannes Frederik Hulk Senior (1829–1911), his sons Hendrik Hulk (1842–1937), Abraham Hulk Junior (1843–1919) and Willem Frederik Hulk (b.1852) and his nephew Johannes Frederik Hulk (1855–1913). Abraham Hulk Senior married Maria Wilhelmina van der Meulen; as well as the sons named above they had two daughters, Maria Cornelia Hulk (born 1838) and Hendrika Geertruida Petronella Hulk (born 1841).

Abraham Senior was the teacher of his brother Johannes Frederik and several other members of his family, and also of the painter Adrianus David Hilleveld.

== Death ==
Although most literature states that he died in London, he actually died on a short visit in Zevenaar in the Netherlands.

== Museums ==
His works hang in the Amsterdam, Dordrecht, Haarlem and Enschede museums.

== Sources ==
- Pieter A. Scheen, Lexicon Nederlandse Beeldende Kunstenaars
- P.T.A.Swillens, Prisma Schilderslexicon
- Christopher Wood, The Dictionary of Victorian Painters
- Boomstra, Ankie De schilders Hulk. Een kunstenaarsfamilie in de 19e eeuw, Utrecht, 1994
- Rijksbureau voor Kunsthistorische Documentatie: Hulk, Abraham
- Allgemeines Künstlerlexikon: Hulk, Abraham (1813)
- Genealogie Hulk on Geneanet by Elaine Paterson
