= The Incredible Hulk: Original Soundtrack Recording =

Soundtrack album by Joe Harnell
- Released: November 1999 (JHCD-02)
- Genre: Score
- Length: 70:38
- Language: English
- Label: Super Tracks Music Group
- Producers: Joe Harnell; Ford A. Thaxton

Joe Harnell chronology
V (1998)	The Incredible Hulk (1999)

The Incredible Hulk: Original Soundtrack Recording is the licensed promotional soundtrack from the 1970s/1980s television series adaptation of The Incredible Hulk.

== Album information ==
This contains compositions by the series composer Joe Harnell which includes suites and compositions from the pilot film and from episodes "Married", "Homecoming", "Prometheus", and "Ricky", with some music that also appeared in the Cliffhangers segments "Stop Susan Williams" and "The Secret Empire".

== Track listing ==
All music is composed by Joe Harnell.

No.	Title	Length
1.	"The Incredible Hulk: Main Title" (Version #1)	1:32
2.	"Love Theme from The Incredible Hulk"	3:05

The Incredible Hulk: The Pilot
No.	Title	Length
3.	"Gamma Ray Treatment"	5:50
4.	"Growing Anger"	3:18
5.	"First Hulk Out / Second Hulk Out"	7:35
6.	"Growing Tension / Explosion / Hulk Rescue and Susan's Death"	8:40
7.	"The Lonely Man Theme"	1:33

Music from the Series
No.	Title	Length
8.	"The Incredible Hulk: Main Title" (Version #2)	1:12
9.	"Married: The Wedding"	2:48
10.	"Prometheus: Arrival at Project Prometheus"	5:13
11.	"Ricky: Montage"	2:19
12.	"Stop Susan Williams: Suite" (also appeared in the Cliffhangers)	6:36
13.	"Homecoming: Suite"	2:10
14.	"The Secret Empire: Suite" (also appeared in the Cliffhangers)	7:51
15.	"Prometheus: Through the Floor / Hulk on the Rampage"	3:48
16.	"Married: Prelude to Tragedy / Death Scene"	3:48
17.	"Pilot: Graveyard Farewell — Lonely Man Theme Reprise"	3:11
18.	"Theme from The Incredible Hulk" (Disco Version)	3:29

== Reception ==
Professional ratings
Review scores
Source	Rating
Filmtracks	3/5 stars
ScoreReviews	3/5 stars
TrackSounds	5/10 stars

The soundtrack received mixed reviews from critics in the music community. Christopher Coleman of TrackSounds gave it a 5 out of 10, citing the opening theme, "Homecoming: Suite", and "The Lonely Man" as unforgettable, while also stating that many of the other tracks are typical seventies fare that could easily fit into any other popular series of that time. Christian Clemmensen of Filmtracks felt that the score had aged badly giving the example of Harnell's work on V, and citing the elements, the seventies pop influence, don't really hold up after thirty years. Andreas Lindahl of ScoreReviews cited some cues as exciting and memorable, but felt the sound was far too small with a feeling that the action music was played by "a tiny chamber music ensemble."
