= 2022 Turkish Women's Cup squads =

List of players competing at the 6th edition of the Turkish Women's Cup

This article lists the squads for the 2022 Turkish Women's Cup, the 6th edition of the Turkish Women's Cup. The cup consisted of a series of friendly games, and was held in Turkey from 16 to 22 February 2022. The six national teams involved in the tournament registered a squad of 23 players.

The age listed for each player is on 16 February 2022, the first day of the tournament. The numbers of caps and goals listed for each player do not include any matches played after the start of tournament. The club listed is the club for which the player last played a competitive match prior to the tournament. The nationality for each club reflects the national association (not the league) to which the club is affiliated. A flag is included for coaches that are of a different nationality than their own national team.

== Squads ==
=== Bulgaria ===
Coach: Silviya Radulska

The squad was announced on 14 February 2022.

No.	Pos.	Player	Date of birth (age)	Caps	Goals	Club
1	GK	Viktoriya Ivanova	25 January 2001 (aged 21)			(Bulgarian Football Union) Sevlievo
3	DF	Yanitsa Ivanova	5 January 2001 (aged 21)			(Bulgarian Football Union) NSA Sofia
5	DF	Nora Dimitrova	26 July 1996 (aged 25)			(Bulgarian Football Union) NSA Sofia
6	DF	Silviya Kefalova	6 June 2001 (aged 20)			(Bulgarian Football Union) NSA Sofia
7	FW	Bilyana Pencheva	23 May 1997 (aged 24)			(Bulgarian Football Union) Lokomotiv Stara Zagora
8	FW	Polina Rasina	12 March 1999 (aged 22)			(Bulgarian Football Union) Barocco
9	MF	Lora Petrova	12 October 1998 (aged 23)			(Italian Football Federation) Spezia
10	MF	Veronika Gotseva	29 May 1993 (aged 28)			(Bulgarian Football Union) Barocco
11	MF	Leonora Zheleva	13 May 1999 (aged 22)			(Bulgarian Football Union) NSA Sofia
12	GK	Roksana Shahanska	23 April 1993 (aged 28)			(Bulgarian Football Union) NSA Sofia
13	DF	Isabela Petrova				(Bulgarian Football Union) Barocco
14	MF	Nina Georgieva	5 July 1995 (aged 26)			(Bulgarian Football Union) Lokomotiv Stara Zagora
15	MF	Dessi Dupuy	10 June 1993 (aged 28)			(Swedish Football Association) Växjö
16	DF	Yana Dineva	8 November 2002 (aged 19)			(Bulgarian Football Union) Lokomotiv Stara Zagora
17	FW	Inna Dimova	15 June 1997 (aged 24)			(Bulgarian Football Union) Barocco
18	DF	Zhasmina Atanasova	25 June 1996 (aged 25)			(Bulgarian Football Union) LP Super Sport
19	MF	Yoana Stankova	20 August 2005 (aged 16)			(Bulgarian Football Union) Lokomotiv Stara Zagora
21	FW	Yuliana Aleksandrova	21 February 1999 (aged 22)			(Bulgarian Football Union) NSA Sofia
22	MF	Ivana Naydenova	21 December 2001 (aged 20)			(Bulgarian Football Union) NSA Sofia
	DF	Nikoleta Boycheva	20 August 1994 (aged 27)			(Bulgarian Football Union) Lokomotiv Stara Zagora

=== Latvia ===
Coach: Romāns Kvačovs

The squad was announced on 10 February 2022. Alise Gaiķe withdrew and was replaced by Kristiāna Zacmane.

No.	Pos.	Player	Date of birth (age)	Caps	Goals	Club
2	DF	Ligita Tumāne	1 May 1996 (aged 25)			(Italian Football Federation) Spezia
3	FW	Ieva Krasnova	7 May 2001 (aged 20)			(Latvian Football Federation) Rīgas FS
5	MF	Nelle Treimane	12 November 2003 (aged 18)			(Latvian Football Federation) Metta
6	DF	Arta Luīze Lubiņa	29 May 2004 (aged 17)			(Latvian Football Federation) Rīgas FS
8	MF	Viktorija Zaičikova	4 August 2000 (aged 21)			(Football Association of Iceland) ÍBV
9	MF	Liāna Rožaščonoka	1 November 2002 (aged 19)			(Latvian Football Federation) Rīgas FS
10	DF	Anastasija Ročāne	7 June 1992 (aged 29)			(Polish Football Association) KKPK Medyk Konin
11	MF	Renāte Fedotova	12 December 1996 (aged 25)			(Italian Football Federation) Pink Bari
13	DF	Sandra Voitāne	16 September 1999 (aged 22)			(Football Association of Iceland) ÍBV
14	MF	Olga Ševcova	26 November 1992 (aged 29)			(Football Association of Iceland) ÍBV
15	FW	Tatjana Baļičeva	6 April 1998 (aged 23)			(Austrian Football Association) SPG SCR Altach/FFC Vorderland
16	MF	Anna Kristīne Gornela	9 September 1997 (aged 24)			(Austrian Football Association) Dornbirn
17	DF	Laura Sondore	29 December 1999 (aged 22)			(Hellenic Football Federation) Trikala
18	DF	Viktorija Vengreviča	6 August 1997 (aged 24)			(Latvian Football Federation) Daugavpils
19	MF	Karlīna Miksone	21 March 2000 (aged 21)			(Polish Football Association) KKPK Medyk Konin
20	MF	Emīlija Sofija Druviņa	15 August 2003 (aged 18)			(Latvian Football Federation) Super Nova
23	GK	Enija Anna Vaivode	28 December 1993 (aged 28)			(Latvian Football Federation) Rīgas FS
	GK	Anastasija Čumika	7 December 1996 (aged 25)			(Russian Football Union) Donchanka
	GK	Madara Matrevica	14 March 2006 (aged 15)			(Latvian Football Federation) Metta
	DF	Sofija Gergeležiu	31 August 2003 (aged 18)			(Latvian Football Federation) Rīgas FS
	MF	Kristiāna Zacmane	20 May 1999 (aged 22)			(Latvian Football Federation) Auda
	MF	Signija Šenberga	13 March 2003 (aged 18)			(Latvian Football Federation) Liepājas
	FW	Katrīna Loreta Gregorio	6 March 2001 (aged 20)			(Swiss Football Association) Lugano

=== Lithuania ===
Coach: Rimantas Viktoravičius

The squad was announced on 12 February 2022.

No.	Pos.	Player	Date of birth (age)	Caps	Goals	Club
1	GK	Klaudija Savickaitė	13 September 1994 (aged 27)			(Lithuanian Football Federation) Hegelmann
2	MF	Meida Proscevičiūtė	29 October 2005 (aged 16)			(Lithuanian Football Federation) Ukmergė
3	DF	Greta Valikonienė	31 January 1997 (aged 25)			(Lithuanian Football Federation) Vilnius
4	DF	Algimantė Mikutaitė	7 December 1996 (aged 25)			(Royal Spanish Football Federation) SE AEM
5	DF	Austė Bernotaitė	26 July 2003 (aged 18)			(Lithuanian Football Federation) Banga
6	DF	Tereza Romanovskaja	17 May 2003 (aged 18)			(Lithuanian Football Federation) Gintra
7	MF	Dovilė Gailevičiūtė	21 July 1996 (aged 25)			(Italian Football Federation) Pink Bari
8	MF	Laura Ruzgutė	9 October 1997 (aged 24)			(Lithuanian Football Federation) Žalgiris
9	MF	Erika Šupelytė	28 July 2003 (aged 18)			(Lithuanian Football Federation) Žalgiris
10	MF	Monika Grikšaitė	7 June 1999 (aged 22)			(Lithuanian Football Federation) Banga
11	DF	Monika Piesliakaitė	2 February 1995 (aged 27)			(Lithuanian Football Federation) Žalgiris
12	GK	Greta Lukjančukė	10 September 1992 (aged 29)			(Lithuanian Football Federation) Saned
13	DF	Vestina Neverdauskaitė	19 September 1993 (aged 28)			(Lithuanian Football Federation) Saned
14	DF	Milda Liužinaitė	17 August 1995 (aged 26)			(Lithuanian Football Federation) Hegelmann
15	FW	Ugnė Lazdauskaitė	9 October 2002 (aged 19)			(Italian Football Federation) Roma CF
16	MF	Anika Kyžaitė	12 July 1999 (aged 22)			(Lithuanian Football Federation) Žalgiris
17	MF	Karolina Zabolotnaja	17 February 1998 (aged 23)			(Lithuanian Football Federation) Hegelmann
18	MF	Agnė Žėglevičiūtė	5 September 1994 (aged 27)			(Lithuanian Football Federation) Hegelmann
19	FW	Dovilė Dockaitė	12 December 2003 (aged 18)			(Lithuanian Football Federation) Šešupė
20	MF	Liucija Vaitukaitytė	24 April 2000 (aged 21)			(Italian Football Federation) Pomigliano
21	MF	Karilė Liužinaitė	10 September 2002 (aged 19)			(Lithuanian Football Federation) Žalgiris
22	GK	Meda Šeškutė	1 August 2003 (aged 18)			(Lithuanian Football Federation) Žalgiris
23	DF	Loreta Rogačiova	19 March 2001 (aged 20)			(Polish Football Association) SKP Bielawianka

=== Ukraine ===
Coach: (Spain) Lluís Cortés

The squad was announced on 8 February 2022. Olha Basanska withdrew from the squad and was replaced by Yana Derkach.

No.	Pos.	Player	Date of birth (age)	Caps	Goals	Club
1	GK	Daryna Bondarchuk	20 May 1998 (aged 23)			(Ukrainian Association of Football) Zhytlobud-2 Kharkiv
2	DF	Iryna Podolska	14 March 1995 (aged 26)			(Ukrainian Association of Football) Zhytlobud-2 Kharkiv
3	DF	Anna Petryk	26 October 1997 (aged 24)			(Ukrainian Association of Football) Zhytlobud-1 Kharkiv
4	DF	Yana Derkach	10 July 1998 (aged 23)			(Turkish Football Federation) Fomget Gençlik ve Spor
4	MF	Iryna Kochnyeva	1 September 1994 (aged 27)			(Ukrainian Association of Football) Kryvbas Kryvyi Rih
5	DF	Anastasiya Voronina	8 May 2002 (aged 19)			(Ukrainian Association of Football) Zhytlobud-1 Kharkiv
7	FW	Yana Kalinina	14 November 1994 (aged 27)			(Ukrainian Association of Football) Zhytlobud-2 Kharkiv
8	MF	Tetyana Kitayeva	28 October 1995 (aged 26)			(Ukrainian Association of Football) Zhytlobud-2 Kharkiv
9	MF	Nicole Kozlova	8 July 2000 (aged 21)			(Danish Football Association) HB Køge
10	MF	Yuliia Shevchuk	25 June 1998 (aged 23)			(Ukrainian Association of Football) Zhytlobud-1 Kharkiv
11	FW	Nadiia Kunina	29 March 2000 (aged 21)			(Swedish Football Association) Linköping
13	MF	Natia Pantsulaia	28 December 1991 (aged 30)			(Ukrainian Association of Football) Zhytlobud-2 Kharkiv
14	DF	Lyubov Shmatko	25 October 1993 (aged 28)			(Ukrainian Association of Football) Zhytlobud-1 Kharkiv
15	MF	Khrystyna Pereviznyk	19 July 1997 (aged 24)			(Ukrainian Association of Football) Ladomir Volodymyr-Volynsky
16	FW	Olha Ovdiychuk	16 December 1993 (aged 28)			(Ukrainian Association of Football) Zhytlobud-1 Kharkiv
17	MF	Daryna Apanashchenko	16 May 1986 (aged 35)			(Ukrainian Association of Football) Zhytlobud-1 Kharkiv
18	MF	Viktoriya Hiryn	24 October 2000 (aged 21)			(Ukrainian Association of Football) Ladomir Volodymyr-Volynsky
18	DF	Kateryna Korsun	28 August 1995 (aged 26)			(Ukrainian Association of Football) Zhytlobud-2 Kharkiv
19	FW	Roksolana Kravchuk	7 November 1997 (aged 24)			(Ukrainian Association of Football) Zhytlobud-2 Kharkiv
20	MF	Yana Malakhova	17 February 1995 (aged 26)			(Ukrainian Association of Football) Zhytlobud-2 Kharkiv
21	MF	Tamila Khimich	13 September 1994 (aged 27)			(Ukrainian Association of Football) Kryvbas Kryvyi Rih
22	DF	Darya Kravets	21 March 1994 (aged 27)			(Italian Football Federation) Fiorentina
22	DF	Tetyana Romanenko	3 October 1990 (aged 31)			(French Football Federation) Reims
23	GK	Kateryna Samson	5 July 1988 (aged 33)			(Ukrainian Association of Football) Zhytlobud-2 Kharkiv
	GK	Iryna Sanina	8 October 1985 (aged 36)			(Ukrainian Association of Football) Kolos Kovalivka
	DF	Solomiya Kupyak	7 June 2000 (aged 21)			(Ukrainian Association of Football) Zhytlobud-1 Kharkiv
	MF	Nadiia Khavanska	2 April 1989 (aged 32)			(Ukrainian Association of Football) Zhytlobud-1 Kharkiv
	MF	Iryna Kotiash	7 May 2001 (aged 20)			(Ukrainian Association of Football) Zhytlobud-2 Kharkiv
	MF	Yuliia Khrystiuk	7 April 2003 (aged 18)			(United States Soccer Federation) Old Dominion Lady Monarchs
	FW	Inna Hlushchenko	12 May 2004 (aged 17)			(Ukrainian Association of Football) Kryvbas Kryvyi Rih

=== Uzbekistan ===
Coach: (Japan) Midori Honda

No.	Pos.	Player	Date of birth (age)	Caps	Goals	Club
1	GK	Laylo Tilovova	8 March 1997 (aged 24)			(Uzbekistan Football Association) Sevinch
2	DF	Yulduz Nabieva	21 November 1995 (aged 26)			(Uzbekistan Football Association) Metallurg Bekabad
3	DF	Ugiloy Kuchkarova	7 December 1996 (aged 25)			(Uzbekistan Football Association) Sevinch
4	MF	Shakhrizoda Zaynitdinova				(Turkish Football Federation) Trabzonspor
5		Maftuna Panjieva				(Uzbekistan Football Association) Sevinch
6		Irodahon Turdalieva				
7	FW	Nilufar Kudratova	5 June 1997 (aged 24)			(Uzbekistan Football Association) Sevinch
8		Ilvina Ablyakimova				(Uzbekistan Football Association) Bunyodkor
9	FW	Makhliyo Sarikova	3 March 1990 (aged 31)			(Kazakhstan Football Federation) CSHVSM
10		Madina Vakhidova				(Uzbekistan Football Association) Pakhtakor Tashkent
11	MF	Maftuna Shoyimova	1 January 1999 (aged 23)			(Uzbekistan Football Association) Sevinch
14	MF	Setora Takaboeva	8 August 2001 (aged 20)			(Turkish Football Federation) Trabzonspor
15	MF	Umida Zoirova	22 April 1998 (aged 23)			(Uzbekistan Football Association) Bunyodkor
16	MF	Ezoza Sharipova	11 June 1996 (aged 25)			(Uzbekistan Football Association) Sogdiana Jizzakh
17	DF	Tanzilya Zarbieva	8 February 1991 (aged 31)			(Uzbekistan Football Association) Metallurg Bekabad
18		Aziza Norboeva				(Uzbekistan Football Association) Bunyodkor
19	DF	Nozima Kamoltoeva	19 September 1998 (aged 23)			(Uzbekistan Football Association) Metallurg Bekabad
20	MF	Kamila Zaripova	19 November 1998 (aged 23)			(Turkish Football Federation) Trabzonspor
21		Shokhida Tojiddinova				
23	FW	Diyorakhon Khabibullaeva	15 September 1999 (aged 22)			(Uzbekistan Football Association) Sogdiana Jizzakh

=== Venezuela ===
Coach: (Italy) Pamela Conti

The 23-player squad was announced on 11 February 2022. The following week it was announced that Nayluisa Cáceres withdrew due to a leg injury and Daniuska Rodríguez withdrew due to a positive COVID-19 result. They were replaced by Zhenia Liendo and Raiderlin Carrasco.

No.	Pos.	Player	Date of birth (age)	Club
1	GK	Yéssica Velásquez	28 July 1989 (aged 32)	(Colombian Football Federation) Santa Fe
2	DF	Nairelis Gutiérrez	2 July 1995 (aged 26)	(Colombian Football Federation) Santa Fe
3	DF	Verónica Herrera	14 January 2000 (aged 22)	Unattached
4	DF	Petra Cabrera	19 May 1990 (aged 31)	(Brazilian Football Confederation) Real Brasília
5	DF	Fabiola Solórzano	1 January 2000 (aged 22)	(Venezuelan Football Federation) Yaracuyanos
6	MF	Michelle Romero	12 June 1997 (aged 24)	(Royal Spanish Football Federation) Sporting Gijón
7	MF	Paola Villamizar	30 June 1994 (aged 27)	(Mexican Football Federation) Tijuana
8	MF	Sonia O'Neill	18 August 1994 (aged 27)	(Croatian Football Federation) Split
9	FW	Deyna Castellanos	18 April 1999 (aged 22)	(Royal Spanish Football Federation) Atlético Madrid
10	MF	Lourdes Moreno	25 January 1997 (aged 25)	(Royal Spanish Football Federation) DUX Logroño
11	FW	Mariana Speckmaier	26 December 1997 (aged 24)	(United States Soccer Federation) Washington Spirit
12	FW	Dubraska Rivera	28 April 1999 (aged 22)	(Venezuelan Football Federation) Yaracuyanos
13	GK	Zhenia Liendo	28 September 2001 (aged 20)	Unattached
14	DF	Camila Pescatore	23 May 2000 (aged 21)	(United States Soccer Federation) William Carey Crusaders
15	FW	Raiderlin Carrasco	11 July 2002 (aged 19)	(Venezuelan Football Federation) Yaracuyanos
16	FW	Gabriela García	2 April 1997 (aged 24)	(Royal Spanish Football Federation) Real Sociedad
17	MF	Maikerlin Astudillo	10 May 1992 (aged 29)	(Royal Spanish Football Federation) AEM
18	MF	Bárbara Sánchez	3 October 1990 (aged 31)	(Football Federation of Chile) Universidad de Chile
19	FW	Kimberlyn Campos	1 January 2000 (aged 22)	(Venezuelan Football Federation) Yaracuyanos
20	MF	Dayana Rodríguez	20 October 2001 (aged 20)	(Brazilian Football Confederation) Atlético Mineiro
21	MF	Bárbara Olivieri	24 February 2002 (aged 19)	(Mexican Football Federation) Monterrey
22	GK	Andrea Tovar	22 August 1990 (aged 31)	(Royal Spanish Football Federation) Getafe Femenino
23	DF	Gabriela Angulo	27 February 2004 (aged 17)	(Venezuelan Football Federation) Deportivo La Guaira

== Player representation ==
=== By club ===
Clubs with 4 or more players represented are listed.

Players	Club
10	(Ukraine) Zhytlobud-2 Kharkiv
8	(Ukraine) Zhytlobud-1 Kharkiv
7	(Bulgaria) NSA Sofia
6	(Lithuania) Žalgiris
5	(Bulgaria) Lokomotiv Stara Zagora, (Latvia) Rīgas FS, (Uzbekistan) Sevinch
4	(Bulgaria) Barocco, (Lithuania) Hegelmann, (Venezuela) Yaracuyanos

=== By club nationality ===
Players	Clubs
24	Ukraine
18	Bulgaria, Lithuania
14	Uzbekistan
11	Latvia
7	Italy, Spain
5	Venezuela
4	Turkey
3	Iceland, Poland, United States
2	Austria, Brazil, Colombia, Mexico, Sweden
1	Chile, Croatia, Denmark, France, Greece, Kazakhstan, Russia, Switzerland

=== By club federation ===
Players	Federation
106	UEFA
14	AFC
10	CONMEBOL
5	CONCACAF

=== By representatives of domestic league ===
National squad	Players
Ukraine	24
Bulgaria	18
Lithuania	18
Uzbekistan	14
Latvia	11
Venezuela	5
