= Anna Valaka =

Latvian footballer (born 1999)

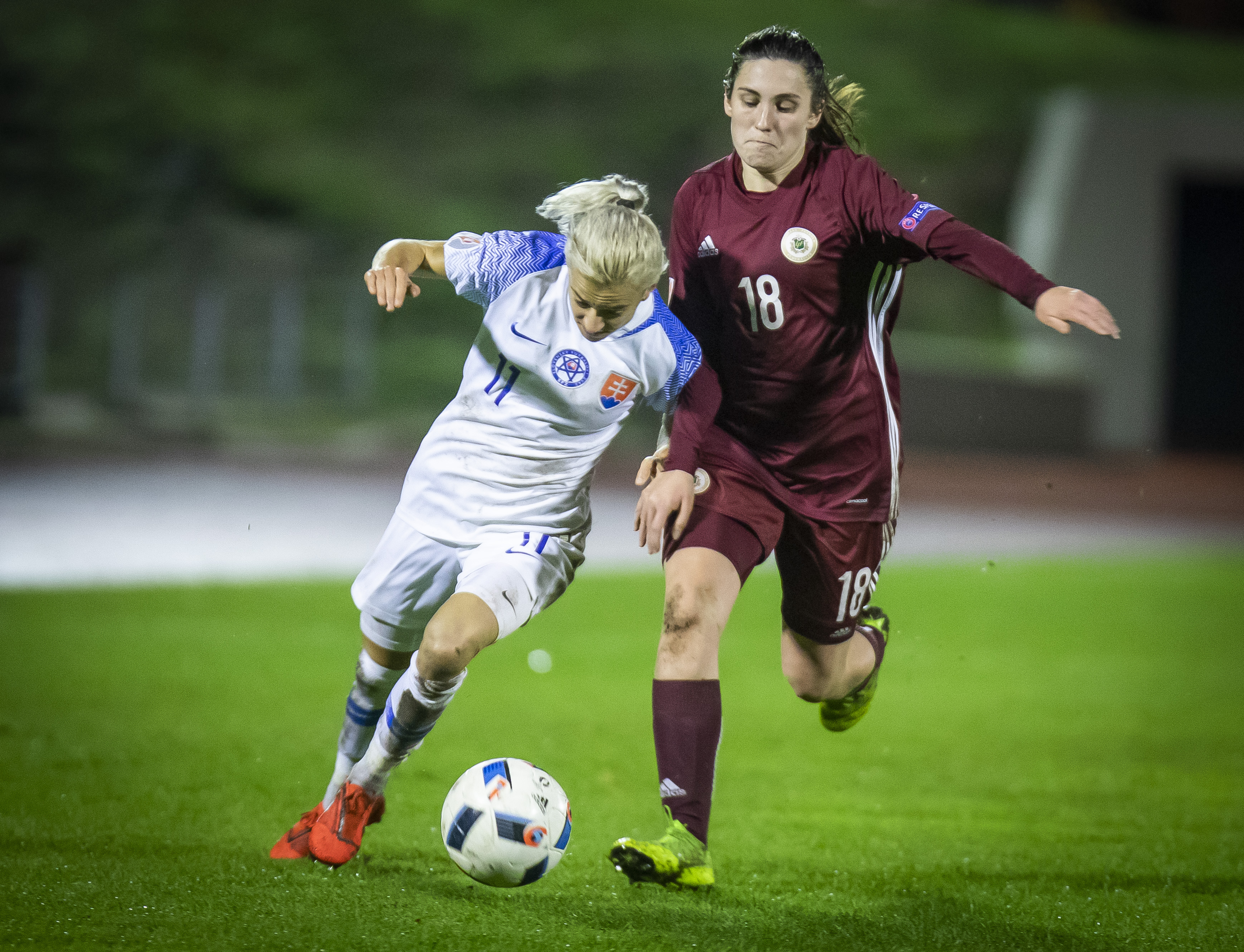

Personal information
- Full name: Anna Marija Valaka
- Date of birth: 14 November 1999 (age 26)
- Positions: Midfielder; centre back

Team information
- Current team: SFK Rīga
- Number: 13

Senior career*
| Years | Team | Apps | (Gls) |
- RFS

International career^{‡}
| 2015 | Latvia U17 | 8 | (0) |
| 2016–2017 | Latvia U19 | 15 | (0) |
| 2019– | Latvia | 24 | (0) |
- * Club domestic league appearances and goals ‡ National team caps and goals as of 19:08 8 April 2025

Anna Marija Valaka (born 14 November 1999) is a Latvian footballer who plays as a midfielder for Sieviešu Futbola Līga club SFK Rīga and the Latvia women's national team.
