= Diāna Suvitra =

Latvian footballer

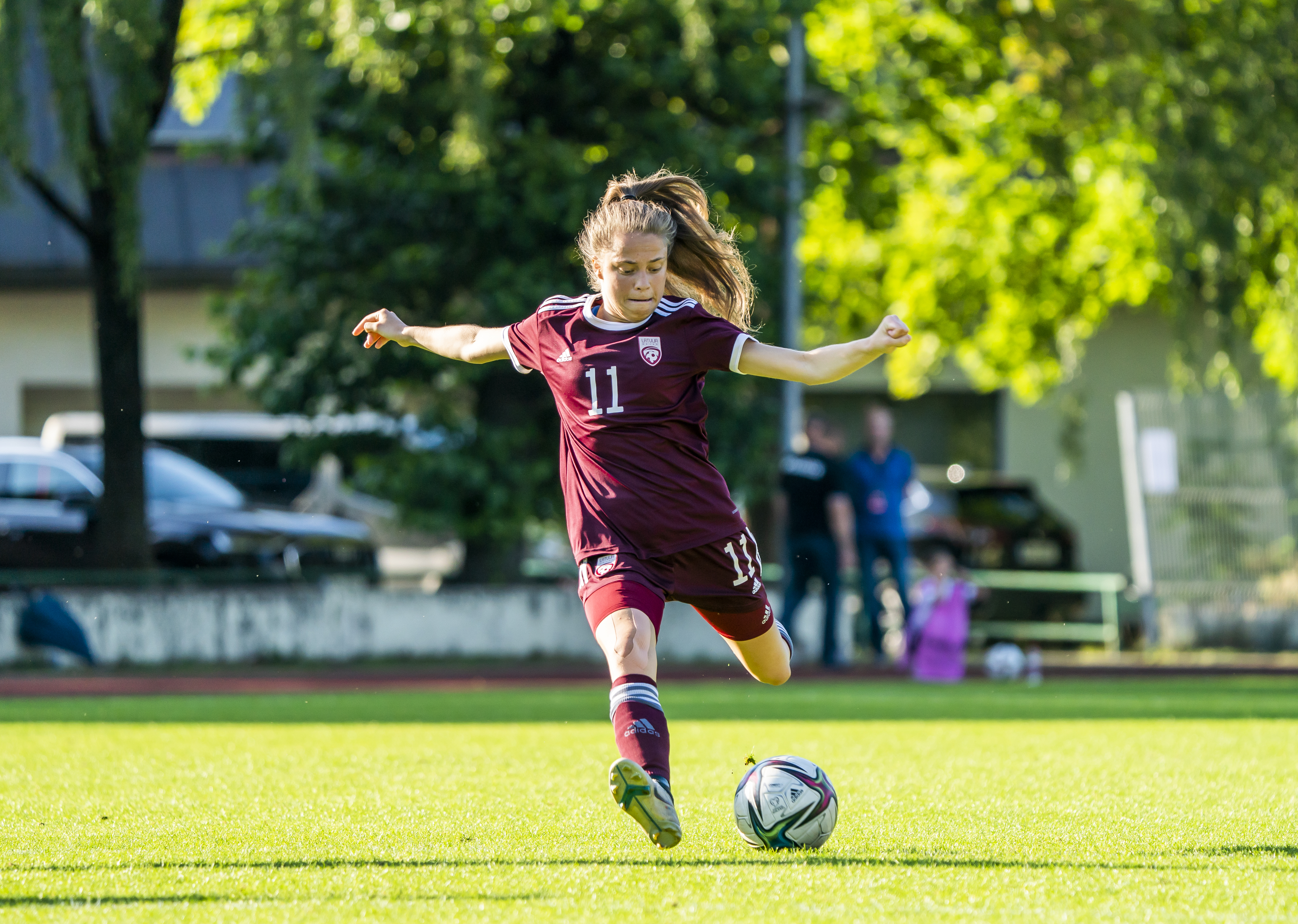
- Suvitra with Latvia

Personal information
- Date of birth: 9 January 2002 (age 24)
- Position: Midfielder

Team information
- Current team: SFK Rīga

Youth career
- 2014-2019: Rīgas Futbola skola

Senior career*
Years	Team	Apps	(Gls)
2019-2020	FK Dinamo Rīga		
2020-2022	Rīgas Futbola skola		
2022-2023	SFK Rīga		
2023	Trianton Ialysos		
2023-	SFK Rīga		

International career^{‡}
2015-2016	Latvia U15	5	(3)
2017-2018	Latvia U17	12	(3)
2019	Latvia U19	8	(0)
2023–	Latvia	18	(3)
- * Club domestic league appearances and goals as of 19 July 2023 ‡ National team caps and goals as of 19:01 8 April 2025

Diāna Suvitra (born 9 January 2002) is a Latvian footballer who plays as a midfielder for Sieviešu Futbola Līga club SFK Rīga and the Latvia women's national team.
