= Sofija Ņesterova =

Latvian footballer

Sofja Ņesterova
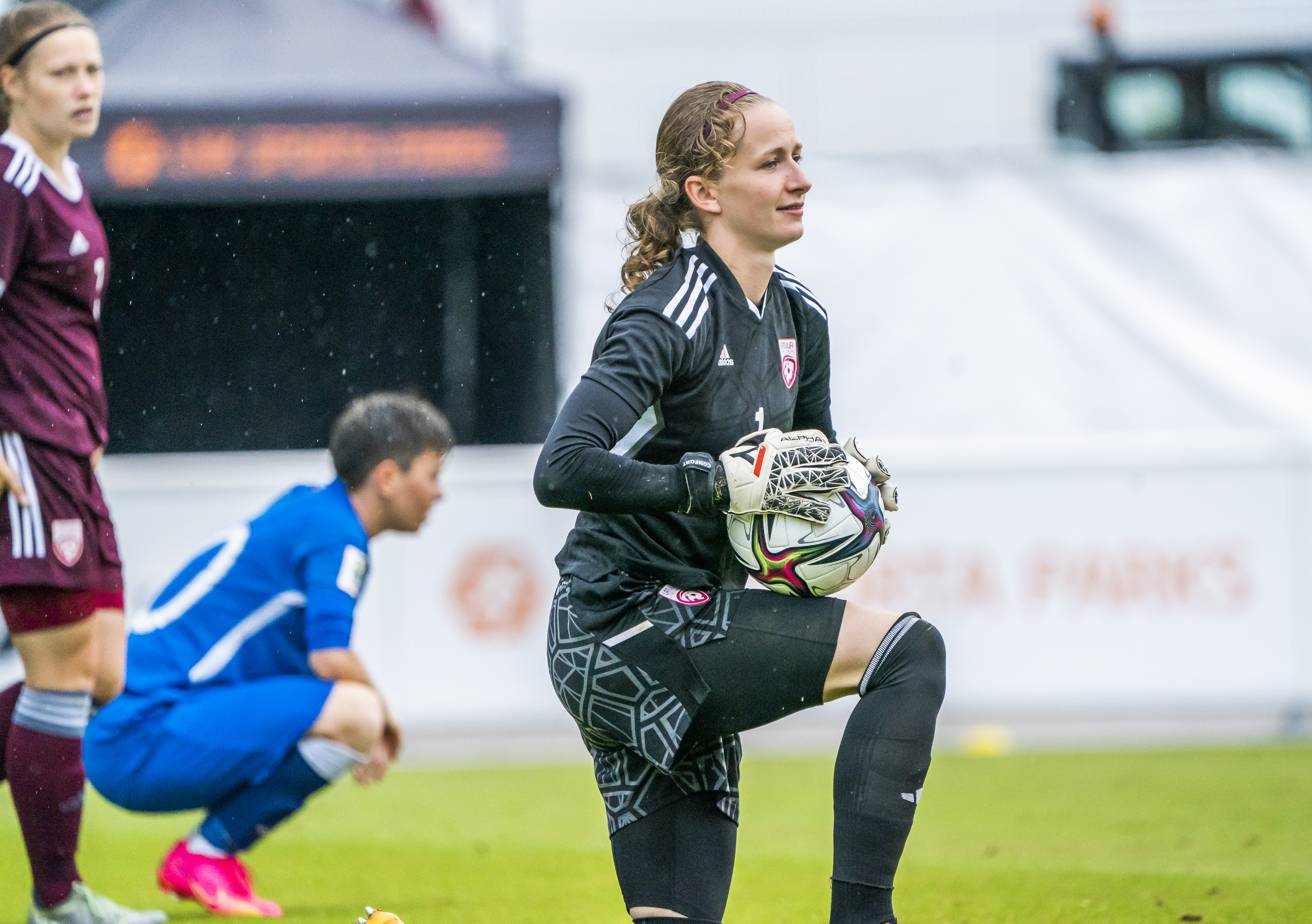
- Ņesterova with Latvia in 2023

Personal information
- Date of birth: 6 August 2001 (age 25)
- Place of birth: Daugavpils, Latvia
- Position: Goalkeeper

Team information
- Current team: Górnik Łęczna

Youth career
- BFC Daugavpils

Senior career*
Years	Team	Apps	(Gls)
2015–2017	Daugavpils BFC / Optimists-R	37	(7)
2018–2021	Rīgas Futbola skola	38	(1)
2022–2025	SFK Rīga		
2025	Werder Bremen	2	(0)
2025–	Górnik Łęczna	3	(0)

International career^{‡}
2015	Latvia U15	2	(0)
2016–2017	Latvia U17	16	(0)
2018–2019	Latvia U19	8	(0)
2018–	Latvia	22	(0)
- * Club domestic league appearances and goals as of 20:59, 2 June 2026 (UTC) ‡ National team caps and goals as of 20:59, 2 June 2026 (UTC)

Sofja Ņesterova (born 6 August 2001) is a Latvian professional footballer who plays as a goalkeeper for Ekstraliga club Górnik Łęczna and the Latvia women's national team.

== Career ==
Ņesterova joined Frauen-Bundesliga club Werder Bremen from SFK Rīga in January 2025, replacing the departing Diede Lemey.

On 25 July 2025, Ņesterova moved to Polish Ekstraliga club Górnik Łęczna.
