= Monika Štube =

Latvian footballer

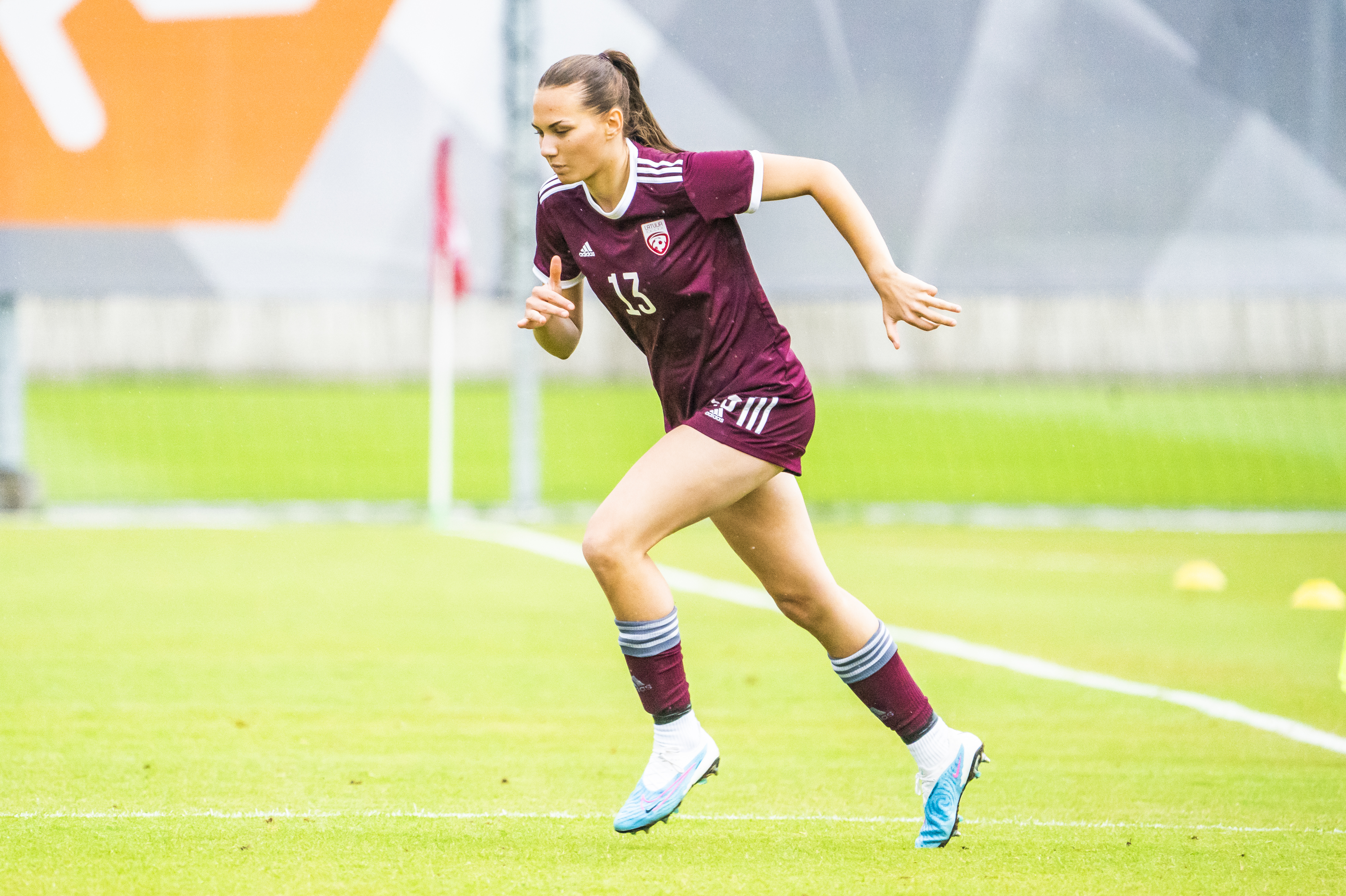

Personal information
- Full name: Monika Estere Štube
- Date of birth: 15 September 1999 (age 27)
- Position: Midfielder

Team information
- Current team: Bradford City
- Number: 14

Senior career*
| Years | Team | Apps | (Gls) |
- Talsu NSS
| 2016–2017 | Leeds United | | |
| 2017–2019 | Guiseley Vixens | | |
| 2019– | Bradford City | 55 | (1) |

International career^{‡}
| 2014–2015 | Latvia U17 | 12 | (0) |
| 2016–2017 | Latvia U19 | 14 | (1) |
| 2017- | Latvia | 4 | (0) |
- * Club domestic league appearances and goals as of 2 June 2024 (UTC) ‡ National team caps and goals as of 21 October 2017

Monika Estere Štube (born 15 September 1999) is a Latvian footballer who plays as a midfielder for FA Women's National League Division One North club Stockport County. She has previously played for Sieviešu Futbola Līga club Talsu NSS and the Latvia women's national team.

== Club career ==
While living in West Yorkshire, England, Štube has represented Leeds United, Guiseley Vixens and Bradford City.

== International career ==
After four years, in September 2021, incoming national team coach Romāns Kvačovs invited Štube to his first training camp. She turned down the call-up for personal reasons.
