= Anastasija Poļuhoviča =

Latvian footballer (born 2005)

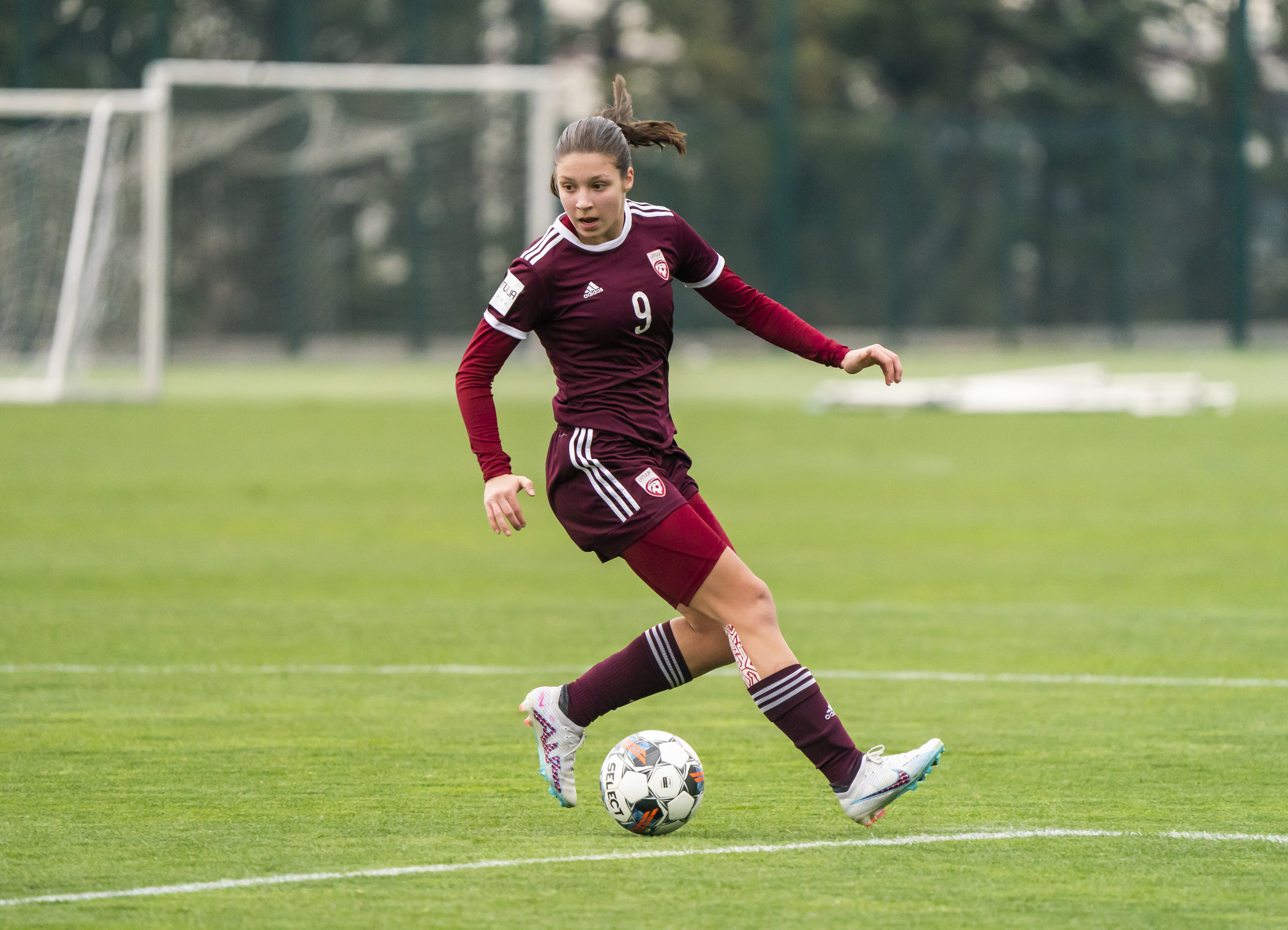
- Poļuhoviča with Latvia in 2023

Personal information
- Full name: Anastasija Poļuhoviča
- Date of birth: 6 March 2005 (age 21)
- Position: Forward

Team information
- Current team: Standard Liège (on loan from Sparta Prague)

Youth career
- –2020: Rīgas Futbola skola

Senior career*
Years	Team	Apps	(Gls)
2020–2022	Rīgas Futbola skola	23	(13)
2022–2025	SFK Rīga	23	(15)
2025–	Sparta Prague	1	(0)
2025–2026	→ Pogoń Szczecin (loan)	19	(8)
2026–	→ Standard Liège (loan)	0	(0)

International career^{‡}
2015–2016	Latvia U15	3	(0)
2017–2018	Latvia U17	2	(0)
2019	Latvia U19	8	(3)
2022–	Latvia	34	(7)
- * Club domestic league appearances and goals as of 20:03, 2 June 2026 (UTC) ‡ National team caps and goals as of 20:03, 2 June 2026 (UTC)

Anastasija Poļuhoviča (born 6 March 2005) is a Latvian professional footballer who plays as a forward for Belgian Women's Super League club Standard Liège, on loan from Sparta Prague, and the Latvia women's national team.

On 7 January 2025, Poļuhoviča signed a multi-year contract with Czech club Sparta Prague. The same year on 28 August, she joined Ekstraliga club Pogoń Szczecin on a one-year loan. On 13 July 2026, Poļuhoviča joined Belgian Women's Super League club Standard Liège on a one-year loan deal.
