= Women's Baltic Football League =

Women's football tournament held between the top clubs from Baltic states

- Baltic Women's Football League
- Founded: 2017
- Teams: 6

The Women's Baltic Football League is an international women's football league confronting the two top teams in Estonia's Meistriliiga, Latvia's Sieviešu Ligas and Lithuania's A Lyga within a round robin format, with no fixtures between both teams from each country. The reigning champions are Latvian Riga FC, who defeated Lithuanian MFA Žalgiris-MRU in the 2025 final.

The tournament was also held in 1990's and then later in 2005–2010 with various rules. It was then revived in 2017.

== Results ==
=== 1990s ===
Edition	Champions	Score	Runner-up	Third place	Score	Fourth place	No. of teams
1991 (1st)	(Lithuania) Centras Kaunas	6–4 (Note: There was no finals in 1991; teams are ranked according to their overall records in the tournament, the old points system was used.)	(Latvia) RAF Jelgava	(Lithuania) Audėja Vilnius	1–1	(Latvia) Fortuna Riga	4
1995 (2nd)	(Lithuania) Žemaitija Telšiai	9–9 (Note: There was no finals in 1995, 1996, 2006, 2017, 2019, 2022; teams are ranked according to their overall records in the tournament.)	(Latvia) Solo Riga	(Latvia) Fortūna Ogre	0	—N/a	3
1996 (3rd)	(Latvia) Jurnieks Riga	29–20	(Estonia) CSK Parnu	(Estonia) FK Parnu	18–15	(Lithuania) Žemaitija Telšiai	5

=== 2005–2010 ===
Edition	Champions	Score	Runner-up	Third place	Score	Fourth place	No. of teams
2006	(Lithuania) Gintra Universitetas	21–15	(Latvia) FK Lutrini Saldus	(Latvia) Cerība-46.vsk.	10–7	(Estonia) Kalev Tallinn	5
2007	(Estonia) Levadia	2–1 (1–1 / 1–0)	(Estonia) Pärnu JK	(Latvia) Skonto/Cerība-46.vsk.	2–2 (a) (1–2 / 1–0)	(Estonia) Kalev Tallinn	12
2008	(Lithuania) Gintra Universitetas	6–1 (4–1 / 2–0)	(Estonia) Levadia	(Estonia) Pärnu JK	8–1 (4–1 / 4–0)	(Estonia) Flora	12
2009	(Lithuania) Gintra Universitetas	3–2	(Latvia) Skonto/Cerība-46.vsk.	(Lithuania) TexTilite Ukmergė	2–1	(Latvia) SK Imanta	4
2010	(Lithuania) Gintra Universitetas	3–0	(Lithuania) TexTilite Ukmergė	(Latvia) Liepājas Metalurgs	2–1	(Latvia) Skonto/Cerība-46.vsk.	4

2006: 1. Gintra-Universitetas 2008: 1. Gintra-Universitetas

=== 2017–present ===
Edition	Champions	Score	Runner-up	Third place	Score	Fourth place	No. of teams
2017	(Lithuania) Gintra Universitetas	12–9	(Estonia) Pärnu JK	(Latvia) Rīgas FS	6–6	(Estonia) Flora	6
2018	(Belarus) FC Minsk	2–1	(Lithuania) Gintra	(Estonia) Flora	3–2	(Estonia) Pärnu JK	7
2019	(Lithuania) Gintra Universitetas	15–12	(Estonia) Flora	(Latvia) Dinamo Riga	7–4	(Estonia) Pärnu JK	6
2020	Tournament suspended due to COVID-19 pandemic						6
2021	Tournament canceled due to COVID-19 pandemic						
2022	(Lithuania) Gintra Universitetas	12–9	(Estonia) Flora	(Latvia) SFK Rīga	6–6	(Estonia) Saku Sporting	6
2023	(Lithuania) Gintra Universitetas	1–0	(Estonia) Flora	(Estonia) Saku Sporting	1–0	(Latvia) SFK Rīga	6
2024	(Estonia) Flora	2–1	(Latvia) SFK Rīga	(Lithuania) Gintra	2–2 (6–5 p)	(Lithuania) Žalgiris-MRU	6
2025	(Latvia) Riga FC	3–1	(Lithuania) MFA Žalgiris	(Lithuania) Gintra	3–0 (t.w.)	(Latvia) RFS	6
2026	(Latvia) Riga FC	7–0	(Lithuania) MFA Žalgiris	(Lithuania) Gintra	5–0	(Latvia) RFS	6

=== Teams reaching the top four ===
Teams reaching the top four
Team	Titles	Runners-up	Third place	Fourth place	Top 4 total
(Lithuania) Gintra	4 (2017, 2019, 2022, 2023)	1 (2018)	3 (2024, 2025, 2026)		8
(Latvia) Riga FC	2 (2025, 2026)				2
(Estonia) Flora	1 (2024)	3 (2019, 2022, 2023)	1 (2018)	1 (2017)	6
(Belarus) FC Minsk	1 (2018)				1
(Lithuania) Žalgiris-MRU		2 (2025, 2026)		1 (2024)	3
(Latvia) SFK Rīga/RFS		1 (2024)	1 (2022)	3 (2023, 2025, 2026)	5
(Estonia) Pärnu JK		1 (2017)		2 (2018, 2019)	3
(Estonia) Saku Sporting			1 (2023)	1 (2022)	2
(Latvia) Rīgas FS			1 (2017)		1
(Latvia) Dinamo Riga			1 (2019)		1

== Editions ==
=== 2017 ===
Pos	Team	Pld	W	D	L	GF	GA	Pts
1	(Lithuania) Gintra Universitetas	4	4	0	0	13	3	12
2	(Estonia) Pärnu JK	4	3	0	1	13	1	9
3	(Estonia) Flora Tallinn	4	2	0	2	6	5	6
4	(Latvia) Rīgas FS	4	2	0	2	9	11	6
5	(Latvia) FK Liepāja	4	1	0	3	3	16	3
6	(Lithuania) Žalgiris Kaunas	4	0	0	4	2	10	0

(Estonia) vs. (Lithuania)			(Lithuania) vs. (Latvia)			(Latvia) vs. (Estonia)		
Flora	1–0	Žalgiris	Gintra	6–1	Liepāja	Rīgas	2–1	Flora
Pärnu	2–0	Žalgiris	Gintra	3–2	Rīgas	Liepāja	0–5	Pärnu
Flora	0–3	Gintra	Liepāja	2–1	Žalgiris	Flora	4–0	Liepāja
Pärnu	0–1	Gintra	Rīgas	5–1	Žalgiris	Rīgas	0–6	Pärnu

=== 2018 ===
Pos	Team	Pld	W	D	L	GF	GA	Pts
1	(Belarus) FC Minsk	6	6	0	0	33	0	18
2	(Lithuania) Gintra Universitetas	6	5	0	1	23	2	15
3	(Estonia) Flora Tallinn	6	4	0	2	12	10	12
4	(Estonia) Pärnu JK	6	2	1	3	10	16	7
5	(Latvia) Rīgas FS	6	2	0	4	8	19	6
6	(Latvia) FK Liepāja	6	1	0	5	1	24	3
7	(Lithuania) Žalgiris Kaunas	6	0	1	5	5	21	1

Final four

Semi-finals (2018-10-26; Radviliškis; Šiauliai)

FC Minsk 8–0 Pärnu JK

Gintra 3–0 Flora

3rd-place (2018-10-28; Radviliškis)

Flora 3–2 Pärnu JK

Final (2018-10-28; Šiauliai)

Gintra 1–2 FC Minsk

=== 2019 ===
Pos	Team	Pld	W	D	L	GF	GA	Pts
1	(Lithuania) Gintra Universitetas	5	5	0	0	27	1	15
2	(Estonia) Flora Tallinn	5	4	0	1	12	6	12
3	(Latvia) FK Dinamo Rīga	5	2	1	2	12	13	7
4	(Estonia) Pärnu JK	5	1	1	3	5	17	4
5	(Latvia) Rīgas FS	5	1	1	3	7	10	4
6	(Lithuania) Žalgiris Kaunas	5	0	1	4	2	18	1

=== 2022 ===
Pos	Team	Pld	W	D	L	GF	GA	Pts
1	(Lithuania) Gintra Universitetas	4	4	0	0	20	1	12
2	(Estonia) Flora Tallinn	4	3	0	1	14	3	9
3	(Latvia) SFK Riga	4	2	0	2	5	6	6
4	(Estonia) Saku Sporting	4	2	0	2	9	8	6
4	(Lithuania) MFA Žalgiris	4	1	0	3	6	13	3
6	(Latvia) SK Super Nova	4	0	0	4	1	24	0

== See also ==
- Baltic League
- Women's Baltic Cup
- Baltic Women's Basketball League
