= Anastasija Ročāne =

Latvian footballer

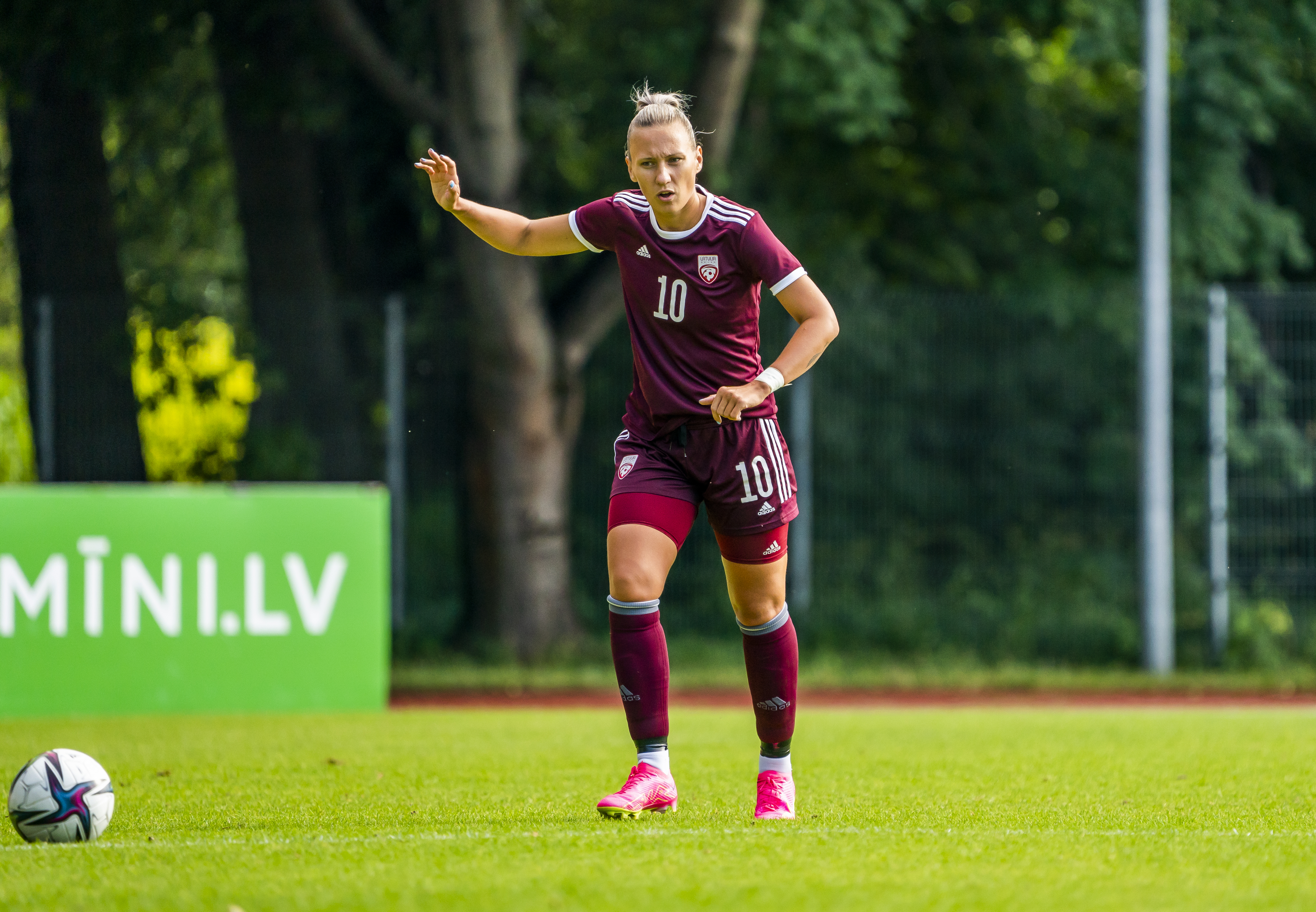

Personal information
- Date of birth: 7 June 1992 (age 34)
- Height: 1.72 m (5 ft 8 in)
- Position: Defender

Team information
- Current team: Pyrgos AFC 1968

Youth career
- 2005–2006: JFS Skonto
- 2006–2010: FK Rīga

Senior career*
Years	Team	Apps	(Gls)
2011–2013	Parnu JK		
2013	Liepāja		
2014–2019	Rīgas FS		
2020	Lokomotiv Plovdiv		
2020–2021	Gintra	18	(4)
2021–2023	Medyk Konin	38	(0)
2023	Czarni Sosnowiec	4	(1)
2024	SPG Lustenau/Dornbirn	9	(1)
2024–2026	Asteras Tripolis	43	(2)
2026–	Pyrgos		

International career^{‡}
2007–2008	Latvia U17	6	(0)
2009–2020	Latvia U19	6	(1)
2011–	Latvia	101	(4)
- * Club domestic league appearances and goals as of 1 August 2026 ‡ National team caps and goals as of 8 April 2025 (UTC)

Anastasija Ročāne (born 7 June 1992) is a Latvian footballer who plays as a defender for Pyrgos AFC in the Greek A Division and the Latvia women's national team.

== Career ==
Ročāne has been capped for the Latvia national team, appearing for the team during the 2019 FIFA Women's World Cup qualifying cycle.

Anastasija Ročāne is the first player in the history of the Latvia women's national football team to reach 100 international appearances.

She made her debut for the national team on 13 February 2011 in a match against Estonia, which ended in a 0–5 defeat. Ročāne earned her 100th cap on 8 April 2025, also in a match against Estonia, which ended in a 1–1 draw.

== Honours ==
Parnu JK

- Meistriliiga: 2011, 2012
- Estonian Cup: 2012
- Estonian Supercup: 2012, 2013

Rīgas FS

- Latvian League: 2014, 2015, 2016, 2017, 2018

Gintra

- Lithuanian A League: 2020

Latvia

- Women's Baltic Cup: 2011, 2017, 2018, 2019
