= Ligita Tumāne =

Latvian footballer

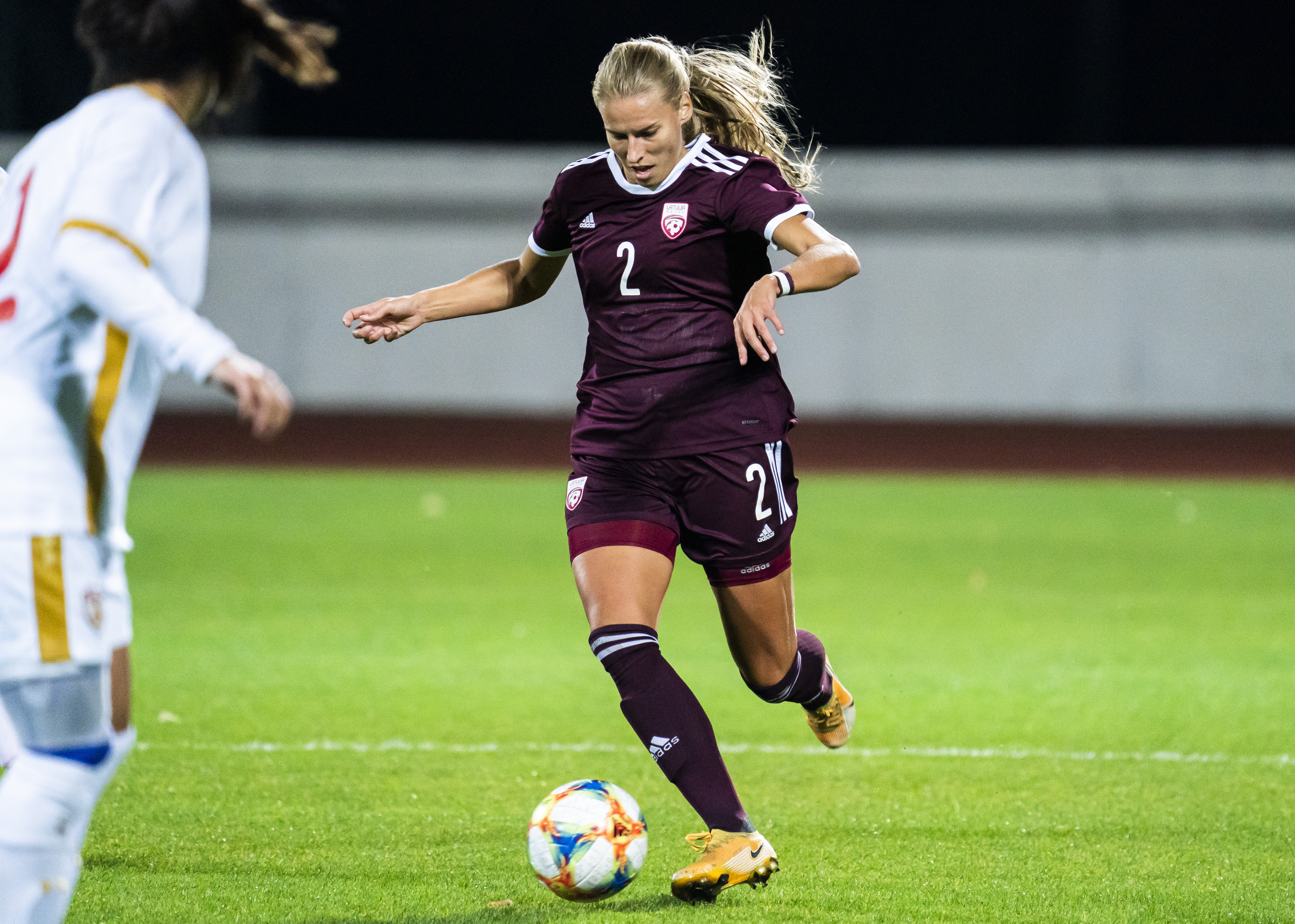

Personal information
- Date of birth: 1 May 1996 (age 30)
- Place of birth: Rēzekne, Latvia
- Position: Defender

Team information
- Current team: Torres

Youth career
- Rēzekne

Senior career*
Years	Team	Apps	(Gls)
2013-2014	Rīgas FS	2	(2)
2013-2014	Pļaviņas DM-VSS	15	(8)
2015	VRS-Optimists-R	11	(1)
2016-2019	Rēzeknes BJSS	52	(35)
2019	RFS	15	(21)
2020-2021	A.S.D. Torres Calcio Femminile		
2021	Spezia Calcio Femminile		

International career^{‡}
2012	Latvia U17	4	(0)
2013–2014	Latvia U19	5	(0)
2018–	Latvia	28	(0)
- * Club domestic league appearances and goals ‡ National team caps and goals as of 19:08 8 April 2025

Ligita Tumāne (born 1 May 1996) is a Latvian footballer who plays as a defender for Italian Serie C club ASD FC Sassari Torres Femminile and the Latvia women's national team.
