= Tatjana Baļičeva =

Latvian footballer

Tatjana Baličeva
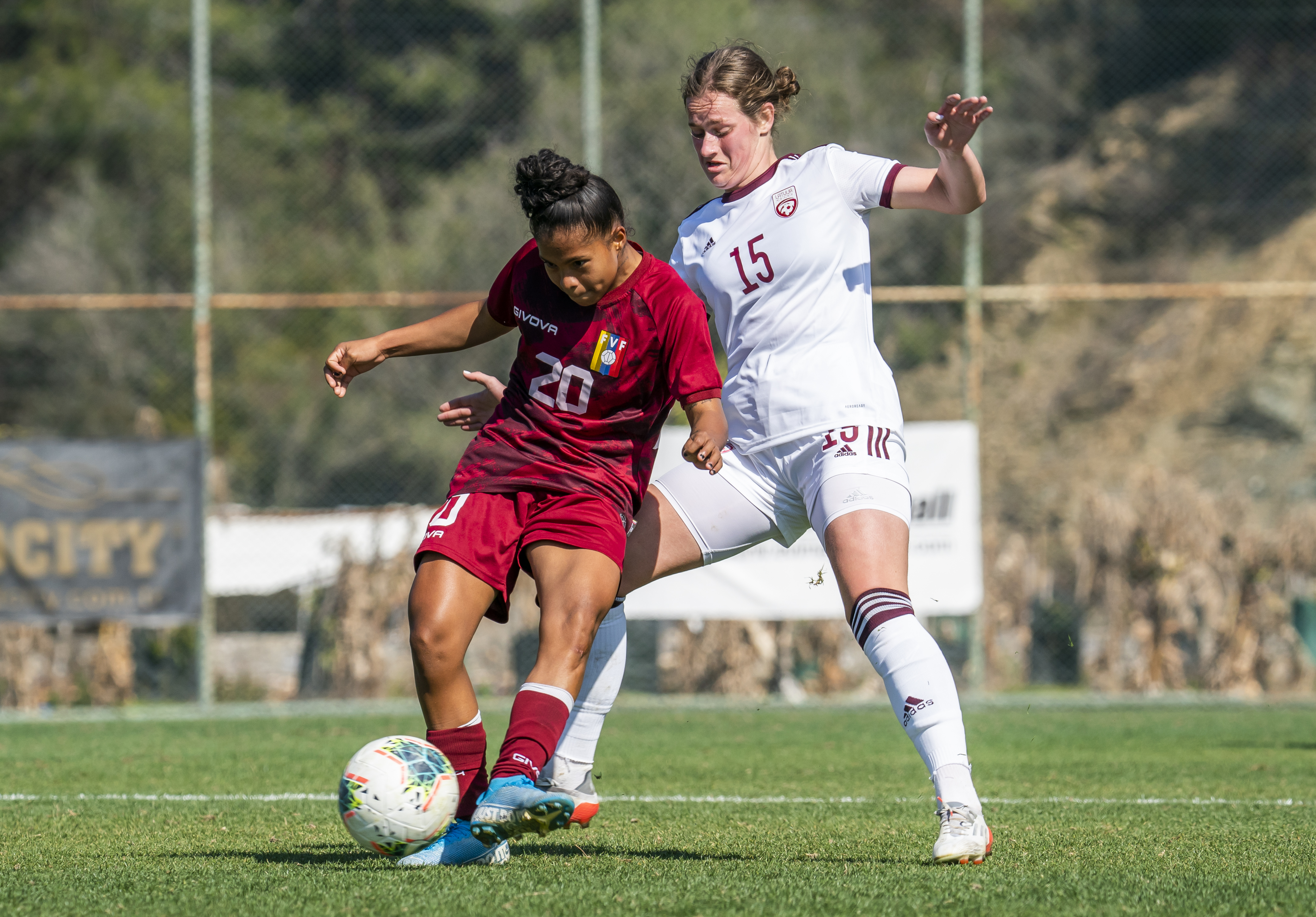

Personal information
- Date of birth: 6 April 1998 (age 28)
- Position: Forward

Team information
- Current team: SFK Rīga
- Number: 20

Youth career
- 2016: Rīgas Futbola skola

Senior career*
Years	Team	Apps	(Gls)
2016 - 2017	FK Banga		
2017	FK Liepāja	11	(12)
2018 - 2019	Riga United	29	(28)
2019 - 2021	Rīgas Futbola skola	37	(18)
2021 - 2022	SC Rheindorf Altach	10	(0)
2022 -	SFK Rīga	10	(4)

International career^{‡}
2013–2014	Latvia U17	7	(0)
2015–2016	Latvia U19	7	(0)
2014–2018	Latvia	26	(0)
- * Club domestic league appearances and goals ‡ National team caps and goals as of 7 July 2023

Tatjana Baličeva (born 6 April 1998) is a Latvian footballer who plays as a forward for Sieviešu Futbola Līga club SFK Rīga and the Latvia women's national team.
