= Emīlija Sofija Druviņa =

Latvian footballer

Emīlija Druviņa
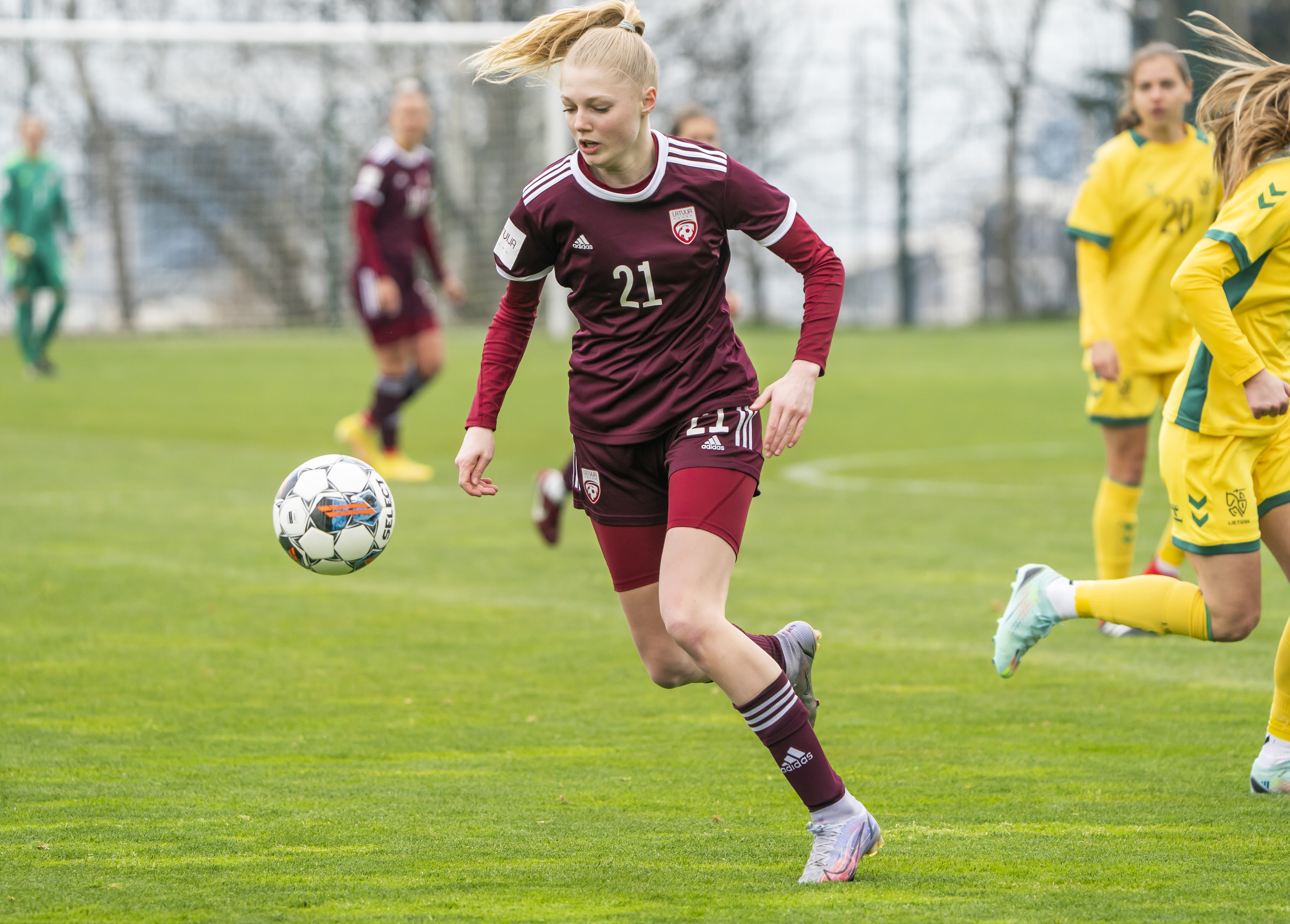

Personal information
- Full name: Emīlija Sofija Druviņa
- Date of birth: 15 August 2003 (age 23)
- Place of birth: Latvia,
- Position: Midfielder

Team information
- Current team: FS Metta
- Number: 2

Youth career
- 2015-2021: FK Iecava

Senior career*
Years	Team	Apps	(Gls)
2021-2023	SK Super Nova	26	(2)
2023	FS Metta	7	(2)

International career^{‡}
2016–2017	Latvia U15	5	(0)
2017–2018	Latvia U17	6	(0)
2021-2022	Latvia U19	6	(0)
2022	Latvia	9	(0)
- * Club domestic league appearances and goals as of 13:05, 20 July 2023 (UTC) ‡ National team caps and goals as of 13:05, 20 July 2023 (UTC)

Emīlija Sofija Druviņa (born 15 August 2003) is a Latvian footballer who plays as a midfielder and has appeared for the Latvia women's national team.

== Career ==
Druviņa has been capped for the Latvia national team, appearing for the team during the 2023 FIFA Women's World Cup qualifying cycle
