= Sofija Gergeležiu =

Latvian footballer

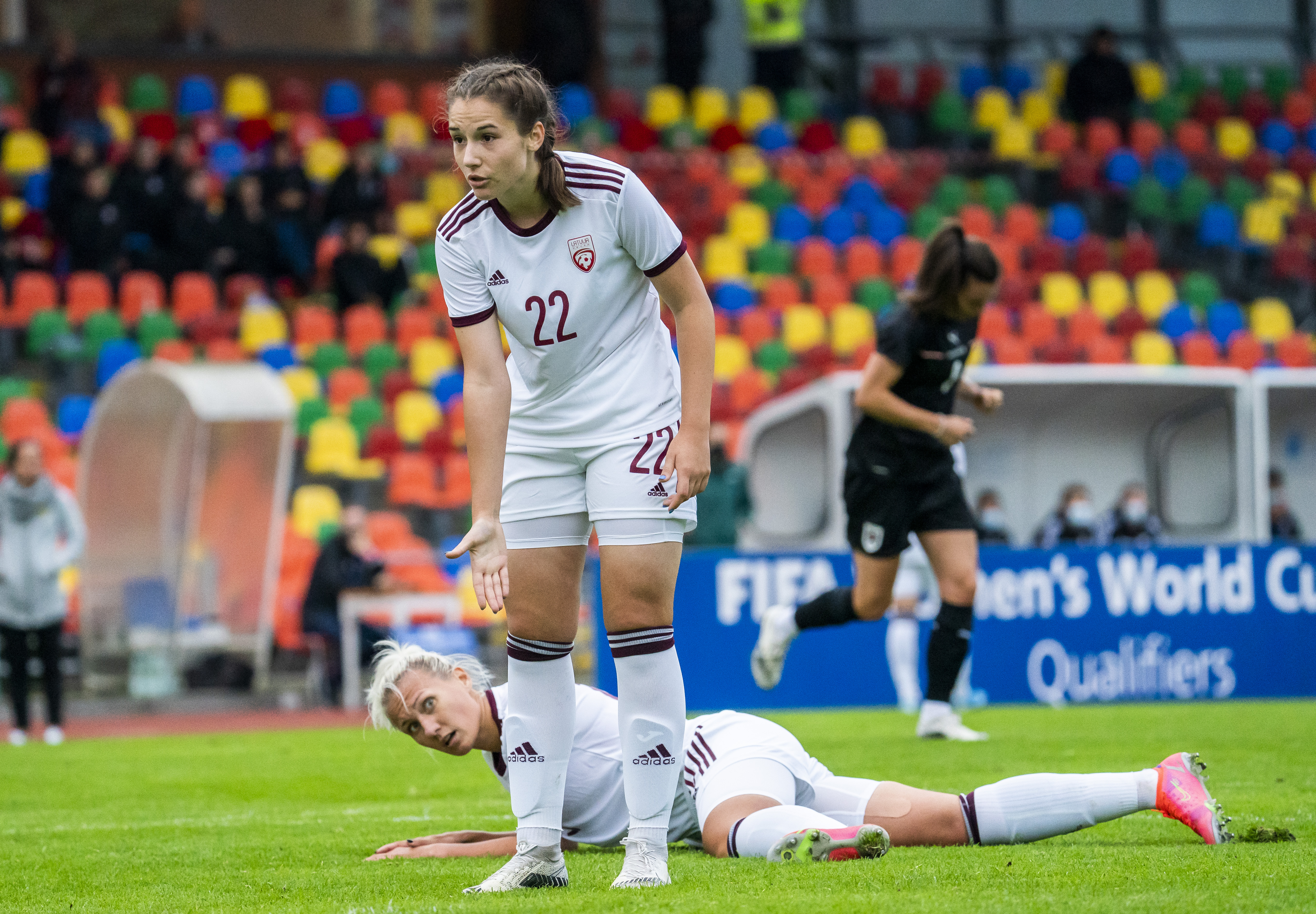

Personal information
- Date of birth: 31 August 2003 (age 23)
- Position: Defender

Team information
- Current team: SFK Rīga

Senior career*
Years	Team	Apps	(Gls)
- RFS
- SFK Rīga

International career^{‡}
2016–2017	Latvia U-15	3	(0)
2018–2019	Latvia U-17	15	(1)
2021–	Latvia U-19	2	(0)
2021–	Latvia	19	(0)
- * Club domestic league appearances and goals ‡ National team caps and goals as of 19:01 8 April 2025 (UTC)

Sofija Gergeležiu (born 31 August 2003) is a Latvian footballer who plays as a defender for SFK Rīga and the Latvia national team.

== International career ==
Gergeležiu made her debut for the Latvia national team on 10 June 2021, coming on as a substitute for Anna Krūmiņa against Lithuania.
