= Liene Vāciete =

Latvian footballer

Personal information
- Full name: Liene Vāciete
- Date of birth: 14 June 1991 (age 35)
- Place of birth: Latvia
- Position: Forward

Team information
- Current team: Latvia (manager)

Senior career*
Years	Team	Apps	(Gls)
2008-2014	SK Imanta		
2015-2017	Riga United		
2018-2021	FS Metta		

International career^{‡}
2007	Latvia U17	3	(0)
2008–2009	Latvia U19	6	(1)
2015–2017	Latvia	21	(7)

Managerial career
- 2018-2021: FS Metta
- 2020-2023: Latvia U17
- 2023-2024: Latvia U19
- 2025-: Latvia
- * Club domestic league appearances and goals ‡ National team caps and goals as of 26 September 2017

Liene Vāciete (born 14 June 1991) is a former Latvian footballer who played as a forward for FS Metta. Currently she is in charge of the Latvia women's national football team.
