= Sandra Voitāne =

Latvian footballer

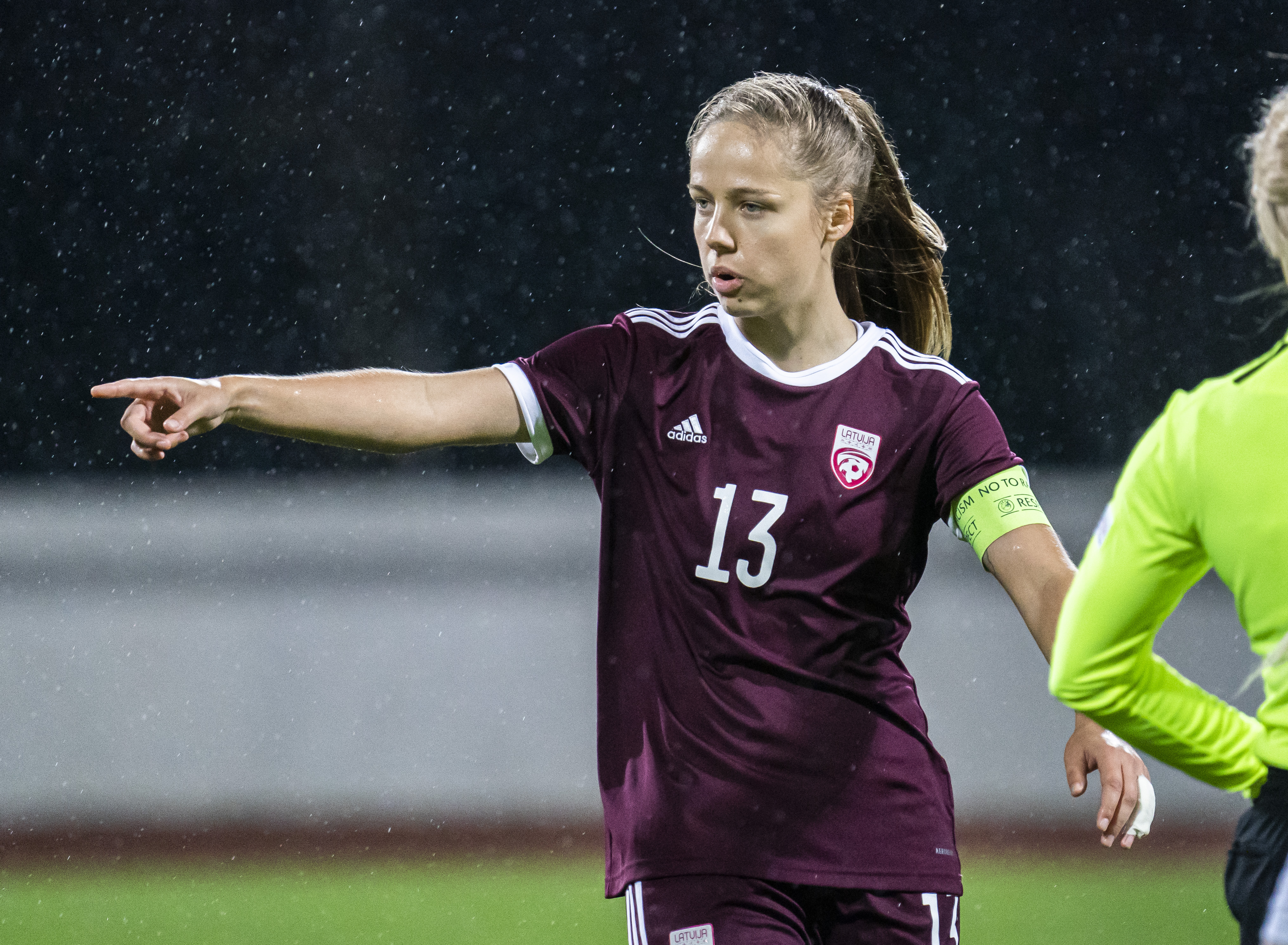

Personal information
- Full name: Sandra Voitāne
- Date of birth: 16 September 1999 (age 27)
- Place of birth: Latvia
- Position: Defender

Team information
- Current team: ÍBV

Youth career
- –2010: Ilūkstes NSS
- 2010–2011: Preiļu BJSS
- 2011–2015: Rēzekne

Senior career*
Years	Team	Apps	(Gls)
2015–2019	Rīgas FS		
2019–2020	Apollon Ladies		
2020–2021	SV Meppen	6	(0)
2021	Wacker Innsbruck	8	(0)
2022	ÍBV		
2022 - 2023	Keflavík		
2023 -	ÍBV		

International career^{‡}
2014–2015	Latvia U17	13	(5)
2016–2017	Latvia U19	14	(4)
2015–	Latvia	73	(15)
- * Club domestic league appearances and goals as of 13 December 2023 ‡ National team caps and goals as of 19:01 8 April 2025

Sandra Voitāne (born 16 September 1999) is a Latvian football Defender who plays for ÍBV in the Úrvalsdeild kvenna. Voitāne began her career as a forward, but over time has transitioned to a defender.

== Club career ==
=== Apollon Ladies ===
Voitāne joined Cypriot First Division club Apollon Ladies in July 2019, and scored five goals in her first 14 appearances.

=== SV Meppen ===
In August 2020, Voitāne joined SV Meppen, becoming the first Latvian to play in the Frauen-Bundesliga. She made her debut on 13 September 2020, as a substitute coming on at the end of the match against Turbine Potsdam. Altogether, she played six matches for the club during the 2020–21 season.

=== Wacker Innsbruck ===
In June 2021, Voitāne joined Austrian club Wacker Innsbruck.

== International career ==
Voitāne debuted for the Latvia senior national team in February 2015, at the age of 15 years old. With the national squad, she has twice won the Baltic Cup.

== International goals ==
No.	Date	Venue	Opponent	Score	Result	Competition
1.	4 April 2015	CSR Orhei, Orhei, Moldova	Luxembourg	1–0	3–4	UEFA Women's Euro 2017 qualifying
2.	4 August 2016	Jānis Skredelis' Stadium, Riga, Latvia	Lithuania	2–0	2–2	2016 Women's Baltic Cup
3.	5 August 2016	Jānis Skredelis' Stadium, Riga, Latvia	Estonia	2–0	2–0	2016 Women's Baltic Cup
4.	6 April 2017	Mikheil Meskhi Stadium, Tbilisi, Georgia	Estonia	2–0	4–0	2019 FIFA Women's World Cup qualification
5.	26 September 2017	Jānis Skredelis' Stadium, Riga, Latvia	Jordan	1–1	1–2	Friendly
6.	6 March 2018	Starlight, Side, Turkey	Kazakhstan	1–1	2–1	2018 Turkish Women's Cup
7.	6 March 2018	Starlight, Side, Turkey	Kazakhstan	2–1	2–1	2018 Turkish Women's Cup
8.	4 April 2018	OSC Halle, Riga, Latvia	Finland	2–1	2–4	Friendly
9.	1 September 2018	TNTK Stadium, Tallinn, Estonia	Lithuania	2–0	4–0	2018 Women's Baltic Cup
10.	2 September 2018	TNTK Stadium, Tallinn, Estonia	Estonia	1–0	2–0	2018 Women's Baltic Cup
11.	5 April 2019	FK Jelgava Sporta, Jelgava, Latvia	Belarus	1–2	1–3	Friendly
12.	14 June 2019	Jānis Skredelis' Stadium, Riga, Latvia	Estonia	2–0	3–0	2019 Women's Baltic Cup
13.	16 February 2022	Gold City Sports Complex, Alanya, Turkey	Bulgaria	1–0	1–1	2022 Turkish Women's Cup
14.	22 February 2022	Gold City Sports Complex, Alanya, Turkey	Lithuania	1–0	1–0	2022 Turkish Women's Cup
15.	31 October 2023	Zimbru Stadium, Chișinău, Moldova	Moldova	3–3	3–3	2023–24 UEFA Women's Nations League

== Honours ==
Individual

- Latvian Footballer of the Year: 2021, 2020
