= Viktorija Vengreviča =

Latvian footballer

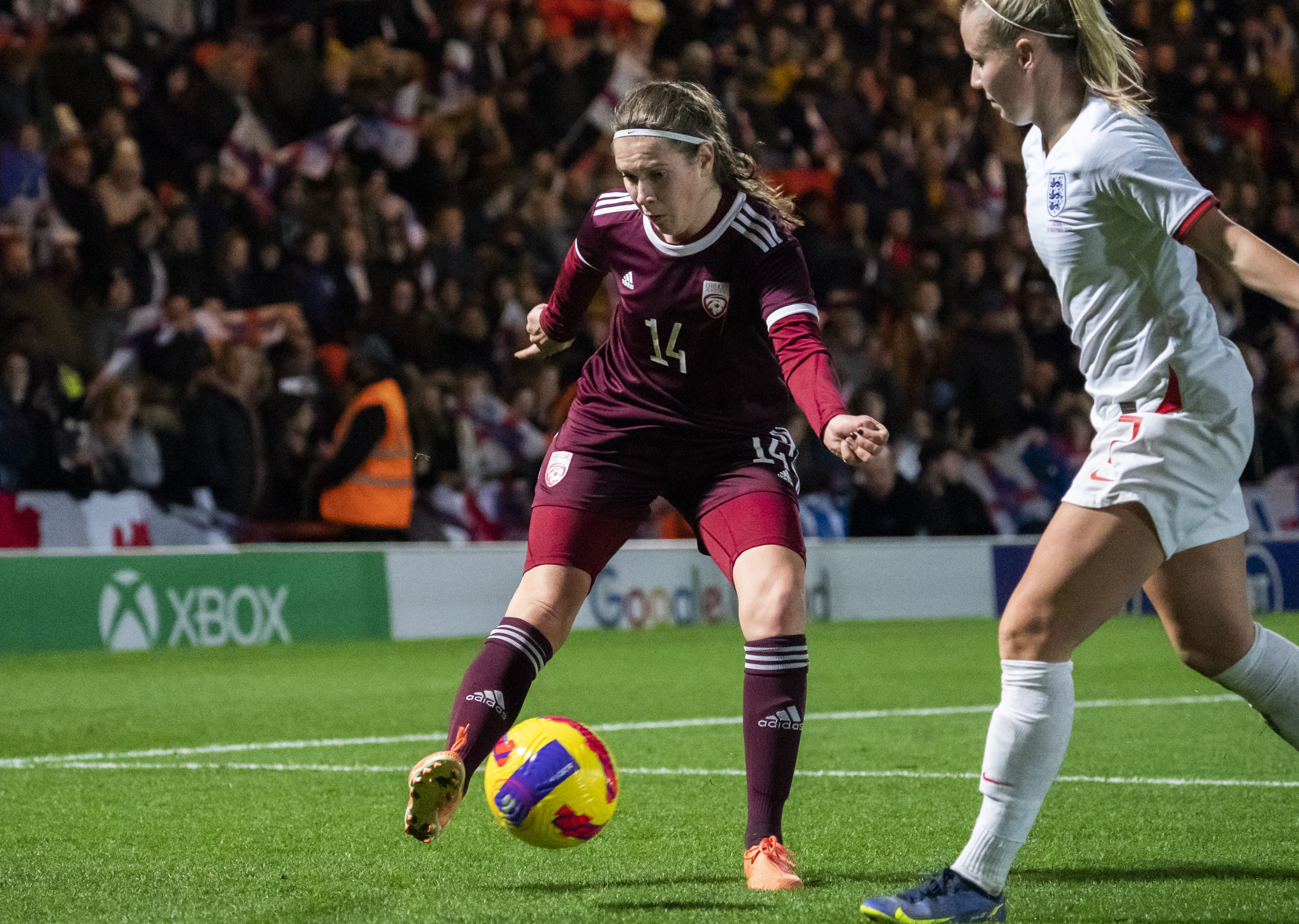

Personal information
- Date of birth: 6 August 1997 (age 29)
- Position: Midfielder

Team information
- Current team: BFC Daugavpils

International career^{‡}
Years	Team	Apps	(Gls)
2015	Latvia U-19	3	(0)
2021–	Latvia	2	(0)
- ‡ National team caps and goals as of 12:59, 20 July 2023 (UTC)

Viktorija Vengreviča (born 6 August 1997) is a Latvian footballer who plays as a midfielder for Daugavpils and the Latvia national team.

== International career ==
Vengreviča made her debut for the Latvia national team on 30 November 2021, coming on as a substitute for Signija Šenberga against England.
