= Anna Krūmiņa =

Latvian footballer

Anna Flakse
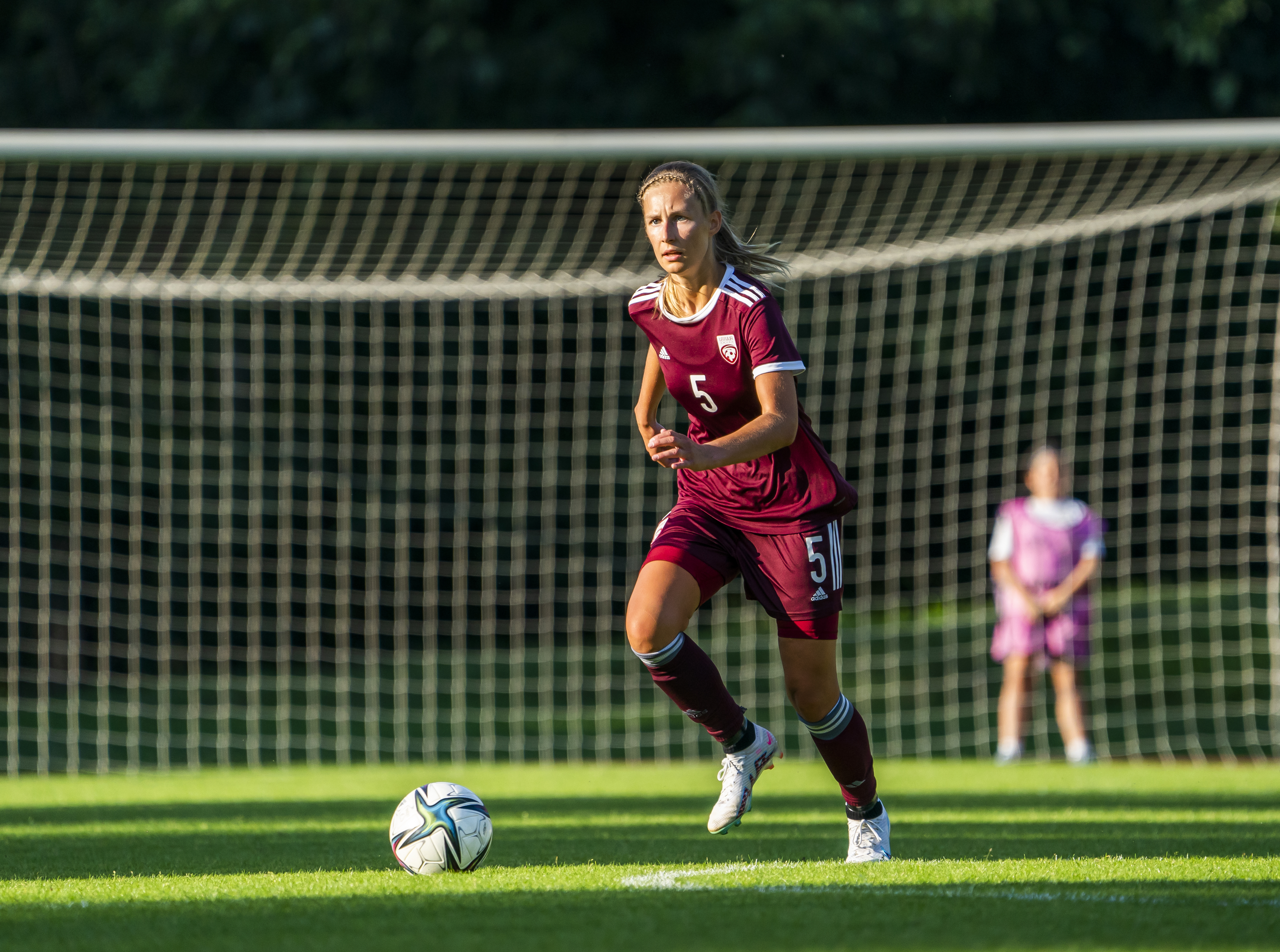

Personal information
- Date of birth: 31 January 1999 (age 27)
- Position: Defender

Team information
- Current team: SFK Rīga

Youth career
- 2007: Ventspils "Cerība
- 2008-2020: FK Tukums 2000
- 2011-2013: FK UVS Stars

Senior career*
Years	Team	Apps	(Gls)
2013-2021	Rīgas Futbola skola	111	(27)
2022-	SFK Rīga	9	(0)

International career^{‡}
2014 - 2015	U-17 Latvia	13	(1)
2016 - 2017	U-19 Latvia	5	(1)
2017 -	Latvia	35	(0)
- * Club domestic league appearances and goals as of 19:42, 6 July 2023 (UTC) ‡ National team caps and goals as of 19:42, 6 July 2023 (UTC)

Anna Flakse (née Krūmiņa (born 31 January 1999) is a Latvian footballer who plays as a defender and has appeared for the Latvia women's national team.

== Career ==
Flakse earned her first cap for the Latvia national team in 2017. She has also appeared for the team during the 2019 FIFA Women's World Cup qualifying cycle.

== Private life ==
Anna Flakse, previously known as Krūmiņa is married to former Latvian footballer Reinis Flaksis.
