= Didzis Matīss =

Latvian football manager

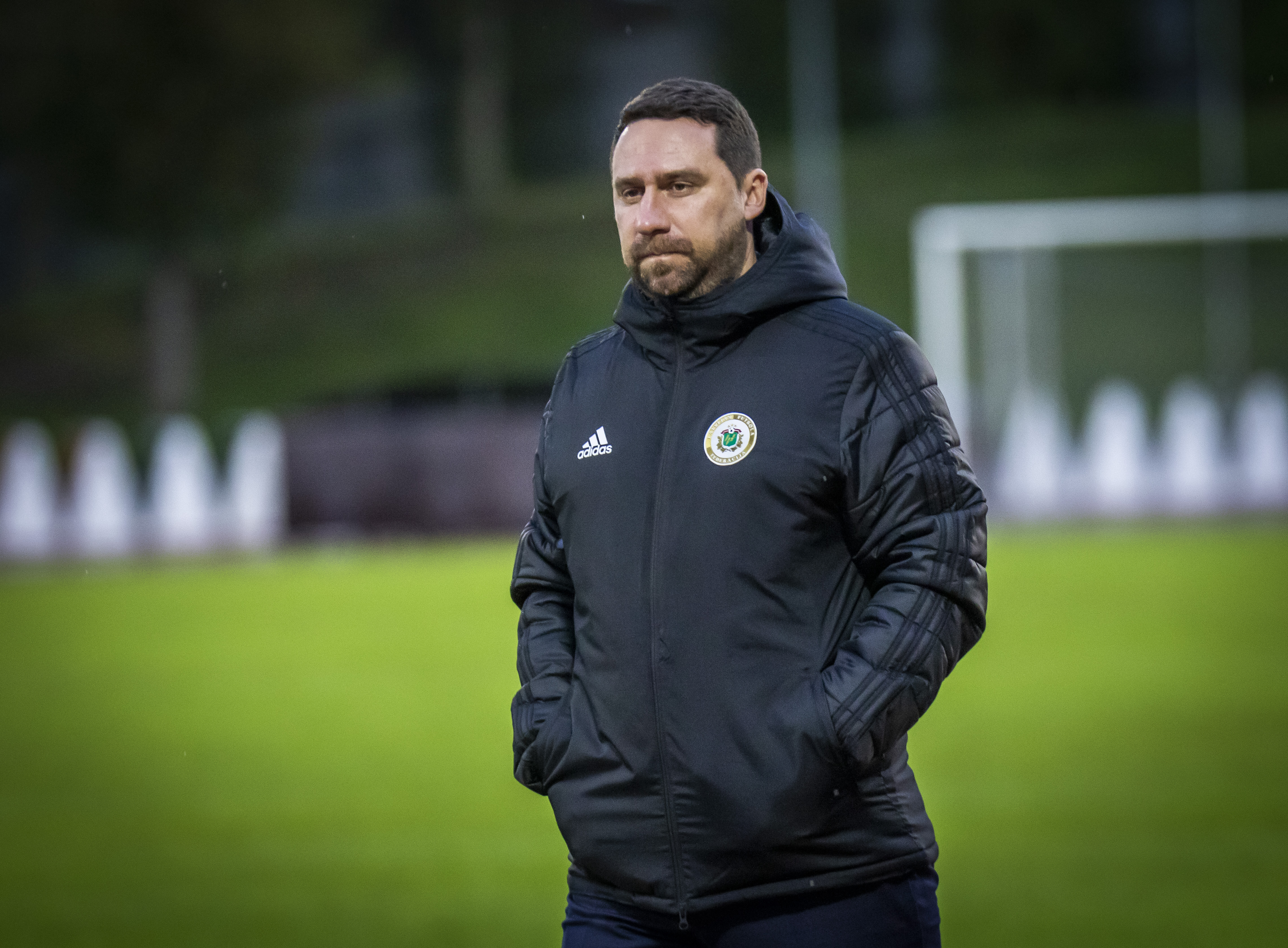

Personal information
- Date of birth: 10 December 1980 (age 45)

Managerial career
- Years: Team
- 2010–2021: Latvia women
- 2013: Latvia U17 women
- 2013: Latvia U19 women

Didzis Matīss (born 10 December 1980) is a Latvian football manager. He was the head coach of the Latvia women's national football team from 2010 until July 2021.
