= Laura Sondore =

Latvian footballer

Personal information
- Date of birth: 29 December 1999 (age 26)
- Place of birth: Atspuka, Rēzeknes novads, Latvia
- Position: Defender

Team information
- Current team: Riga FC Women

Senior career*
Years	Team	Apps	(Gls)
2014–2018	Rēzeknes BJSS	51	(30)
2018–2019	FS Metta	22	(1)
2019–2020	Torres		(0)
2020–2021	AEL Limassol	6	(1)
2021	Crotone	5	(0)
2021–2022	Aris Limassol	3	(0)
2022–2024	FC Carmen București		(0)
2023-2024	Kastoria	8	(0)
2024-	Riga FC Women		(0)

International career^{‡}
2014–2015	Latvia U17	13	(0)
2016–2017	Latvia U19	9	(0)
2018–	Latvia	15	(0)
- * Club domestic league appearances and goals ‡ National team caps and goals as of 8 April 2025

Laura Sondore (born 29 December 1999) is a Latvian footballer who plays as a defender for Greek A Division (women's football) club Kastoria and the Latvia women's national team.
