= Evelyn Arsenault =

Latvian footballer (born 2003)

Personal information
- Full name: Evelina Dace Johanson Arsenault
- Date of birth: 15 October 2003 (age 23)
- Place of birth: Canada
- Position: Defender

Youth career
- Ottawa South United

College career
Years	Team	Apps	(Gls)
2021–2023	UConn Huskies	21	(1)
2024–2025	UC Santa Barbara Gauchos	25	(2)

International career^{‡}
2026–	Latvia	5	(0)
- ‡ National team caps and goals as of 18 April 2026

Evelina Dace Johanson Arsenault (Latvian: Evelīna Arseno; born 14 October 2003) is a footballer who plays as a defender. Born in Canada, she is a Latvia international.

== Early life ==
Arsenault was born on 14 October 2003. Born in Canada, she is of Latvian descent through her maternal grandparents.

Growing up, she attended Earl of March Secondary School in Canada. Following her stint there, she attended University of Connecticut in the United States. Subsequently, she attended the University of California, Santa Barbara, in the United States.

== Club career ==
As a youth player, Arsenault joined the youth academy of Canadian side Ottawa South United.

== International career ==
Arsenault is a Latvia international. During the spring of 2026, she played for the Latvia women's national football team for 2027 FIFA Women's World Cup qualification.
