= Signija Šenberga =

Latvian footballer

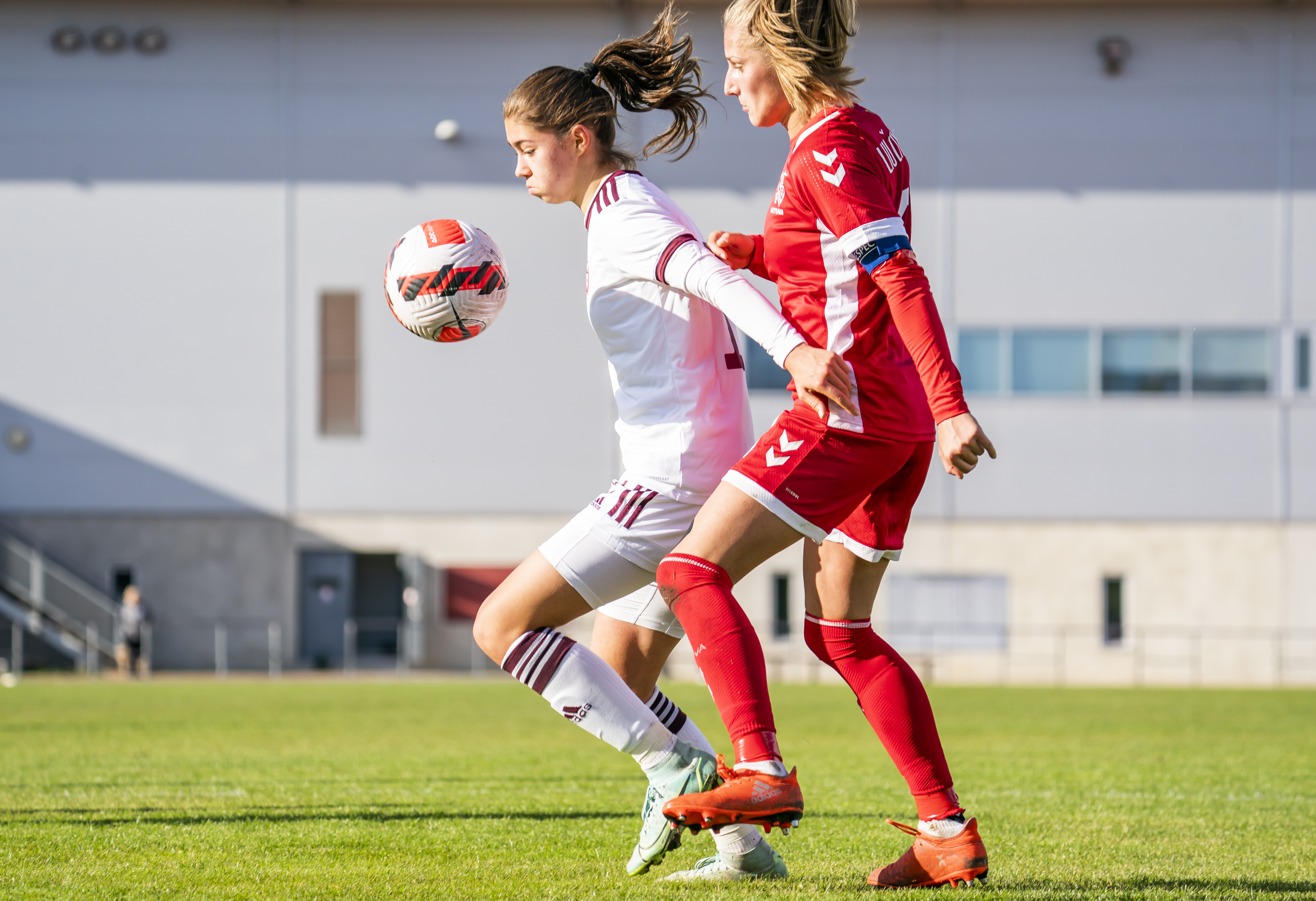

Personal information
- Date of birth: 13 March 2003 (age 23)
- Position: Midfielder

Team information
- Current team: FS Metta (women)

International career^{‡}
| Years | Team | Apps | (Gls) |
| 2017 | Latvia U-15 | 1 | (0) |
| 2018 | Latvia U-17 | 4 | (1) |
| 2021– | Latvia U-19 | 9 | (0) |
| 2020– | Latvia | 14 | (0) |
- ‡ National team caps and goals as of 19:01 8 April 2025 (UTC)

Signija Šenberga (born 13 March 2003) is a Latvian footballer who plays as a midfielder for FS Metta (women) and the Latvia national team.

== International career ==
Šenberga made her debut for the Latvia national team on 27 October 2020, coming on as a substitute for Ksenija Nagle against Slovakia.
