= Dessi Dupuy =

Bulgarian footballer (born 1993)

Dessi Dupuy Деси Дюпюи
Personal information
- Full name: Dessislava Eva Dupuy
- Date of birth: 10 June 1993 (age 33)
- Place of birth: Sofia, Bulgaria
- Height: 1.65 m (5 ft 5 in)
- Positions: Midfielder; forward

Team information
- Current team: Växjö DFF
- Number: 21

Youth career
- E.C. Glass Hilltoppers
- Central Virginia United

College career
Years	Team	Apps	(Gls)
2011–2014	Lynchburg Hornets	96	(105)

Senior career*
Years	Team	Apps	(Gls)
2016–2017	ETG Ambilly		
2018	AGSM Verona	10	(3)
2018–2019	Hellas Verona	22	(8)
2019–2020	Florentia	9	(1)
2021	KIF Örebro DFF	14	(1)
2022–	Växjö DFF	15	(10)

International career^{‡}
2021–	Bulgaria	3	(0)
- * Club domestic league appearances and goals as of 9 October 2021 ‡ National team caps and goals as of 18 September 2021

Dessislava Eva Dupuy (Bulgarian: Десислава Ева Дюпюи, born 10 June 1993), known as Dessi Dupuy, is a Bulgarian footballer who plays as a midfielder or a forward for Swedish club Växjö DFF and the Bulgaria women's national team.

== Early life ==
Dupuy was born in Sofia to a Nigerian father and a Turkish mother. When she was two, having previously been left in an orphanage, she was adopted by an American woman, from whom she has taken her current last name, and then taken to live in the United States. She was raised in Lynchburg, Virginia.

== High school and college career ==
Dupuy has attended the E. C. Glass High School the University of Lynchburg in her hometown.

== Club career ==
Dupuy is a product of Central Virginia United SC in the United States. She has played for ETG Ambilly in France; for AGSM Verona, Hellas Verona and Florentia in Italy and for KIF Örebro DFF in Sweden.

== International career ==
Dupuy capped for Bulgaria at senior level during the 2023 FIFA Women's World Cup qualification.
