= Viktorija Zaičikova =

Latvian footballer (born 2000)

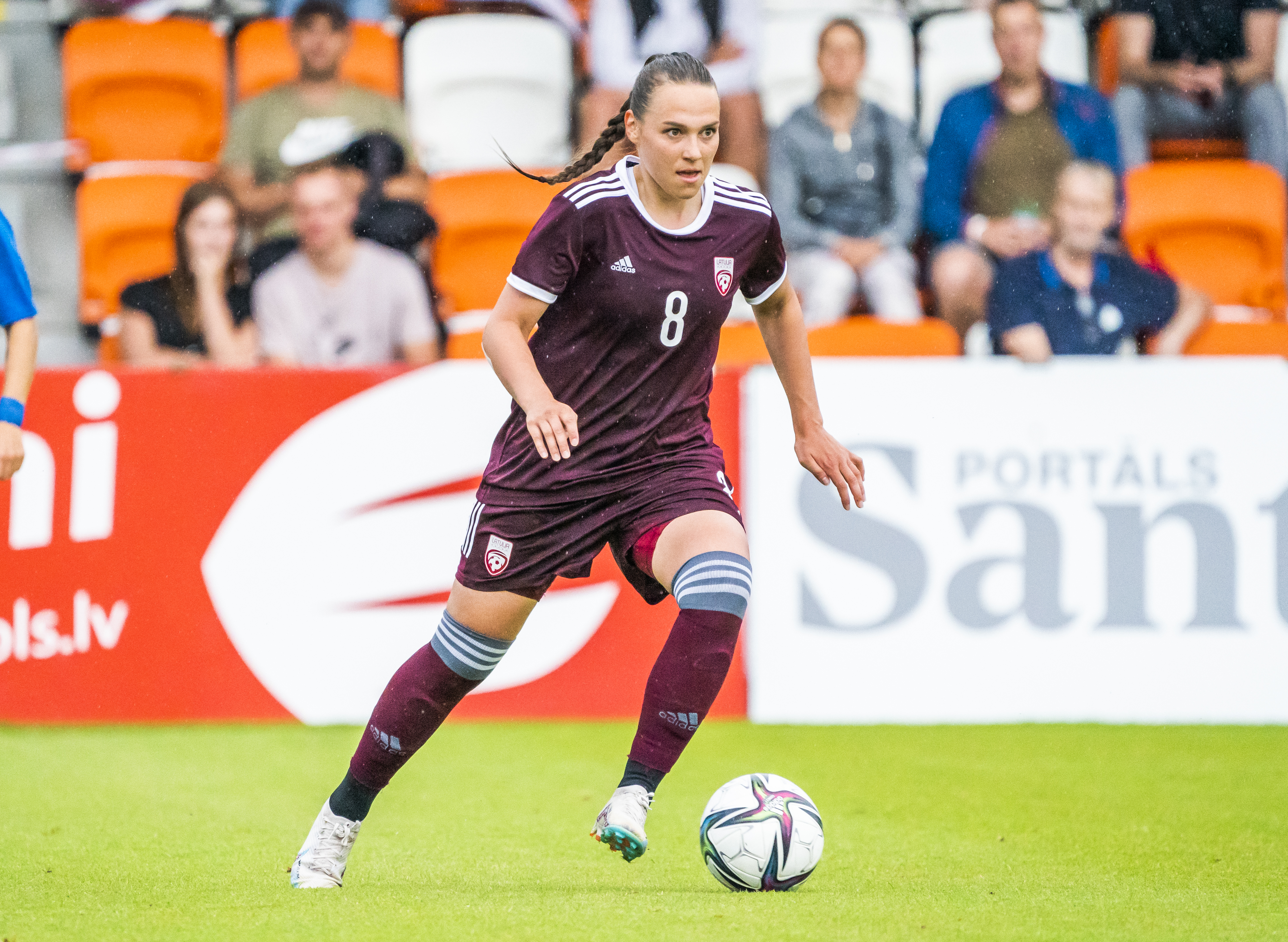

Personal information
- Date of birth: 4 August 2000 (age 26)
- Place of birth: Latvia,
- Position: Forward

Team information
- Current team: ÍBV
- Number: 17

Youth career
- 2008-2010: UVS Stars
- 2010-2014: Tukums / Talsi

Senior career*
Years	Team	Apps	(Gls)
2014-2020	Rīgas FS		
2021-	ÍBV	57	(10)

International career^{‡}
2017-	Latvia	65	(5)
- * Club domestic league appearances and goals as of 19:50, 8 February 2021 (UTC) ‡ National team caps and goals as of 19:01 8 April 2025 (UTC)

Viktorija Zaičikova (born 4 August 2000) is a Latvian footballer who plays as a forward and has appeared for the Latvia women's national team.

== Career ==
Zaičikova has been capped for the Latvia national team, appearing for the team during the 2019 FIFA Women's World Cup qualifying cycle and UEFA Women's Euro 2022 qualifying.
