= Marija Ibragimova =

Latvian footballer

Personal information
- Date of birth: 17 September 1996 (age 30)
- Position: Goalkeeper

International career^{‡}
Years	Team	Apps	(Gls)
- Latvia
- ‡ National team caps and goals as of 19:42, 30 August 2019 (UTC)

Marija Ibragimova (born 17 September 1996) is a Latvian footballer who plays as a goalkeeper and has represented the Latvia women's national team.

== Career ==
Ibragimova has been capped for the Latvia national team and appeared during the 2019 FIFA Women's World Cup qualifying cycle.
