= FK Iecava =

Football club

- Full name: Futbola klubs Iecava
- Founded: 2005
- Stadium: Iecavas stadions
- Capacity: ~200
- Website: https://fkiecava.lv/

FK Iecava is Latvian football club located in Iecava, Bauska Municipality. It was founded in 2005 and features both a senior women's section (which plays in the Latvian Women's League) and youth sections. The men's team mostly limits its performances to the annual Latvian Football Cup.

== Players ==
=== First-team men's squad ===
As of 2007 Note: Flags indicate national team as defined under FIFA eligibility rules; some limited exceptions apply. Players may hold more than one non-FIFA nationality.

No.	Pos.	Nation	Player
—		(Latvia) LVA	Juris Ludriķis
—		(Latvia) LVA	Mārtiņš Zaumanis
—		(Latvia) LVA	Matīss Bičevskis
—		(Latvia) LVA	Andrejs Tiščenko
—		(Latvia) LVA	Oskars Oleksivs

No.	Pos.	Nation	Player
—		(Latvia) LVA	Jānis Oļehnovičs
—		(Latvia) LVA	Aleksandrs Korņilovičs
—		(Latvia) LVA	Sandis Artimovičs
—		(Latvia) LVA	Deniss Kučerins
