= Monika Piesliakaitė =

Lithuanian footballer

Personal information
- Date of birth: 2 February 1995 (age 31)
- Place of birth: Kaunas, Lithuania
- Height: 1.81 m (5 ft 11 in)
- Position: Defender

Team information
- Current team: FC Hegelmann

Senior career*
Years	Team	Apps	(Gls)
2021-2022	MFK Žalgiris		

International career^{‡}
2018–	Lithuania	11	(0)
- * Club domestic league appearances and goals as of 2 May 2021 ‡ National team caps and goals as of 3 January 2024

Monika Piesliakaitė (born 2 February 1995) is a Lithuanian footballer who plays as a defender for FC Hegelmann and the Lithuania women's national team.

== Career ==
Piesliakaitė started her career playing in Kaunas.

Piesliakaitė has been capped for the Lithuania national team.

== Honours ==
- Lithuanian Women's A League
  - Runner Up: 2021, 2022
