= Romāns Kvačovs =

Latvian football manager

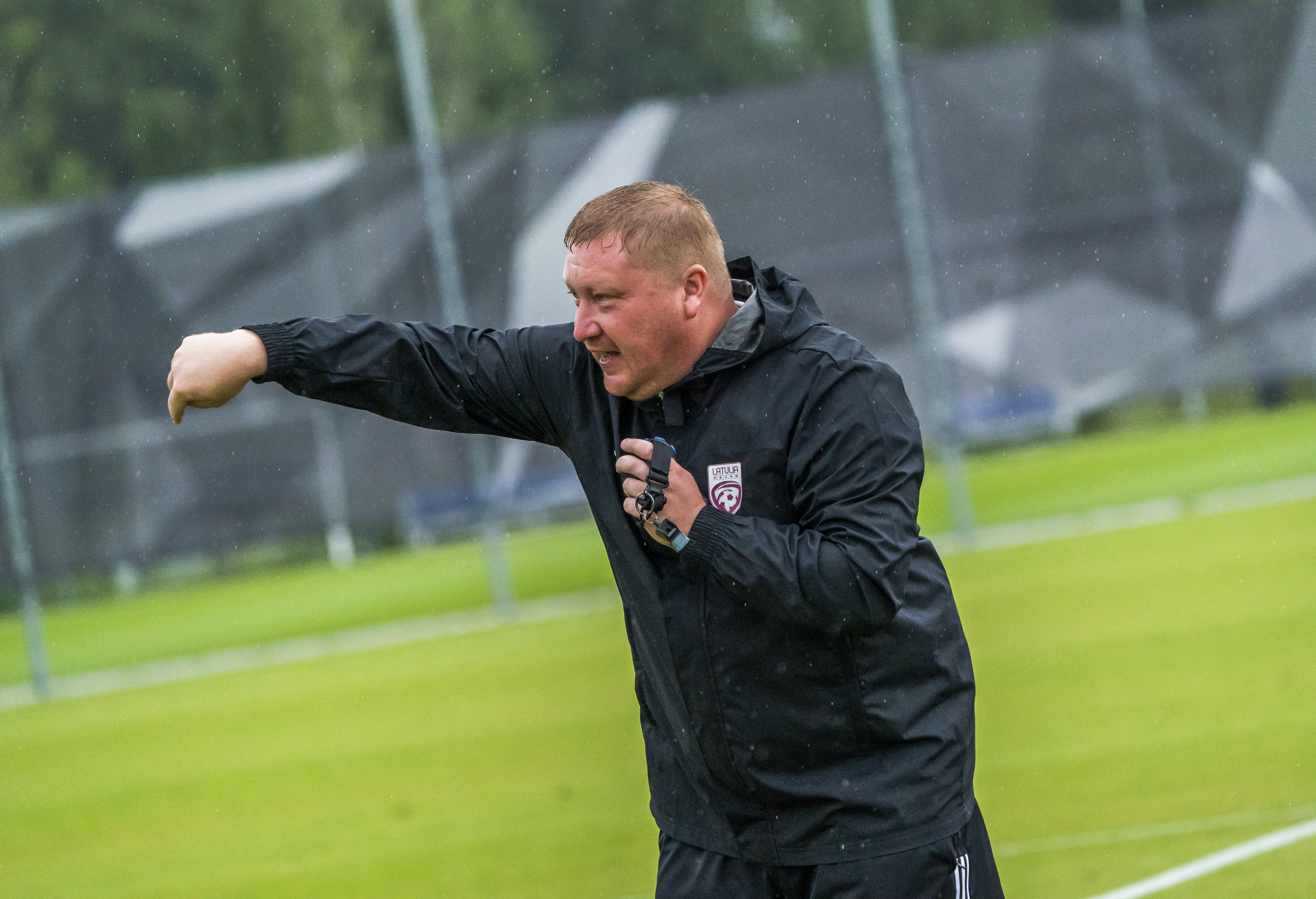

Personal information
- Date of birth: 17 January 1980 (age 46)

Team information
- Current team: Aris Ladies FC

Managerial career
- Years: Team
- 2021–2024: Latvia
- 2025–: Aris Ladies FC

Romāns Kvačovs (born 17 January 1980) is a Latvian football manager. He was appointed as the head coach of the Latvia women's national football team in August 2021.
