= Latvian Women's League =

Top division of Latvian women's association football

LuckyBet Latvian Women's League
- Founded: 1992/2004
- Country: Latvia
- Confederation: UEFA
- Number of clubs: 7 (2025)
- Level on pyramid: 1
- Relegation to: Latvian Altero.lv Women's 1. League
- Domestic cup: Latvian Cup
- League cup: Latvian Women's Supercup
- International cup: UEFA Champions League
- Current champions: Riga FC Women (2nd title) (2025)
- Most championships: Rīgas FS (8 titles)
- Website: lff.lv
- Current: 2026 Latvian Women's League

The Latvian Women's League (Latvian: Sieviešu futbola līga) is the top level women's football league of Latvia. The winning team of the league qualifies for a spot in the UEFA Women's Champions League.

== History ==
The league was first founded in 1992 as a fully amateur competition, given that organized women's football began in Latvia just a few years before with the founding of the Latvija team in 1989. The first champions were Fortūna-Rego from Riga. However, after the debut of the Latvia women's national football team in 1993 ended with four losses, the financially-strapped Latvian Football Federation dissolved the national team, impacting the development of the entire sport and the league, which became inactive until around 2004. The national team was re-founded in 2006 and the league started to rebuild its foundations, with men's teams like Skonto forming their women's sides.

As participation is optional, no Latvian team competed in any of the European club competitions until 2011/12 when SK Liepājas Metalurgs entered European territory.

In the 2024 season, the Latvian Women's Football League featured 8 teams from 4 different Latvian cities – Riga, Liepāja, Iecava and Olaine. This was also the first season where the league secured a title sponsor, making its full name the LuckyBet Women's Football League (LuckyBet Sieviešu futbola līga) for the next three years, partnering with the sports betting firm LuckyBet.

== Related competitions ==
In 2015, the Altero.lv Latvian Women's First League (Latvian: Altero.lv Sieviešu 1. līga) was established as the second level of the league pyramid. The last-placed team in the Women's League is relegated to the First League, the winner of which is promoted to the Women's League.

In 2014, the Latvian Women's Cup was launched.

The first league cup in Latvian women's football – the Women's Supercup (Latvian: Latvijas sieviešu Superkauss futbolā) game was held on 14 March 2025 at LNK Sporta Parks in Riga. The 2024 Women's League winners, Riga FC Women, defeated 2024 Latvian Women's Cup winners RFS Women 3-0.

== Teams ==
=== By titles ===
2026 season

Club	City	Titles
Riga FC Women	Rīga	1
FS Metta	Rīga	0
RFS Women	Rīga	2
FK Auda	Ķekava	0
FK Iecava/FK Olaine	Olaine	0
Rīgas Futbola skola	Rīga	8
BJSS Rēzekne	Rēzekne	0

== List of champions ==
Champions so far are:

- 1992: Fortūna-Rego (Riga)
- 1993-2003: unclear (Note: The status and activity of women's soccer is unclear due to the lack of support from the Latvian Football Federation at this time period)
- 2004: Cerība-46.vsk. (Riga)
- 2005: Saldus FK - Lutriņi (Saldus/Lutriņi)
- 2006: Cerība-46.vsk.
- 2007: FK Lutriņi
- 2008: Skonto / Cerība (Riga)
- 2009: Skonto / Cerība
- 2010: SK Liepājas Metalurgs (Liepāja)
- 2011: Skonto / Cerība
- 2012: SK Liepājas Metalurgs
- 2013: Rīgas FS
- 2014: Rīgas FS
- 2015: Rīgas FS
- 2016: Rīgas FS
- 2017: Rīgas FS
- 2018: Rīgas FS
- 2019: Dinamo Riga
- 2020: Rīgas FS
- 2021: Rīgas FS
- 2022: SFK Rīga
- 2023: SFK Rīga
- 2024: Riga FC Women
- 2025: Riga FC Women
- 2026: Riga FC Women

== Top scorers ==
The following is a list of the league's top scorers since the 2013. Renāte Fedotova and Anastasija Čemirtāne have won the award a record three times. Until 2025, Anastasija Tarasova, Karlīna Miksone and Santa Sanija Vuškāne achieved the highest number of goals per season, scoring 32 goals, until this record was broken by American player Alexxis Sierra Lipsey in the 2025 season, scoring 56 goals.

Season	Top scorer	Club	Goals
2013	Renāte Fedotova	Rīgas Futbola skola	29
2014	Anastasija Tarasova	FK Liepāja	32
2015	Renāte Fedotova	Rīgas Futbola skola	14
2016	Renāte Fedotova	Rīgas Futbola skola	28
2017	Olga Ševcova	Rīgas Futbola skola	25
2018	Karlīna Miksone	Rīgas Futbola skola	32
2019	Karlīna Miksone	FK Dinamo Rīga	19
2020	Viktorija Zaičikova	Rīgas Futbola skola	24
2021	Anastasija Čemirtāne	Rīgas Futbola skola	15
2022	Anastasija Čemirtāne	SFK Rīga	20
2023	Anastasija Čemirtāne	SFK Rīga	29
2024	Santa Sanija Vuškāne	RFS	32
2025	Alexxis Sierra Lipsey	Riga FC Women	56
2026	TBA	TBA	TBA

=== All-time goalscorers ===
Rank	Country	Player	Goals	Years
1	(Latvia)	Anastasija Čemirtāne	117	2016
2	(Latvia)	Renāte Fedotova	100	2013

== See also ==
- Latvia women's national football team
- Latvia women's national under-17 football team
- Latvia women's national futsal team
