= Latvia women's national football team =

Women's national association football team representing Latvia

Latvia
- Nickname: Sarkanbaltsarkanie(Red-White-Red)
- Association: Latvijas Futbola federācija
- Confederation: UEFA (Europe)
- Head coach: Liene Vāciete
- Captain: Anastasija Ročāne
- Most caps: Anastasija Ročāne (103)
- Top scorer: Karlīna Miksone (27)
- FIFA code: LVA
First colours	Second colours

FIFA ranking
- Current: 102 ▲3 (20 October 2026)
- Highest: 61 (December 2004 – March 2005; December 2005 – May 2006)
- Lowest: 119 (October – December 2022; June – August 2023)

First international
- Sweden 9–0 Latvia (Nynäshamn; Sweden 18 August 1993)

Biggest win
- Latvia 6–0 Lebanon (Geroskipou, Cyprus; 13 March 2015)

Biggest defeat
- England 20–0 Latvia (Doncaster, England; 30 November 2021)
- Website: lff.lv/izlases/sieviesu-izlases/nacionala-sieviesu-izlase/

The Latvia women's national football team (Latvian: Latvijas sieviešu futbola izlase) represents Latvia in international football and is controlled by the Latvian Football Federation, the governing body for football in Latvia. They have never qualified for a major international tournament.

Latvia, alongside their Baltic rivals, Lithuania and Estonia, also participates in the local sub-regional Women's Baltic Cup, which takes place every year. Latvia has won this tournament five times, the first time in 1997. The next moment of triumph had to wait until 2011. Latvia closed out the 2010s by winning the trophy three years in a row, in 2017, 2018 and 2019, winning again in 2025.

== History ==
In the Union of Soviet Socialist Republics (USSR), women's football was not a recognized sport – in 1972, the Sports Committee of the USSR even banned women's football competitions. That is why women played the first official football matches in Latvia only in 1989, when the first women's team "Latvija" was created. The players were mostly invited from other sports, so the football players had good physical preparation, and several players from Lithuania were also invited to help. In 1990, the team was renamed to RAF Jelgava, participating in the first championship of the highest league of the USSR, where they took eighth place in the competition of 24 teams. RAF played one more season in the top league of the USSR, but another team from Latvia – Ogres "Fortūna" – competed in the first league of the USSR. After the collapse of the USSR, the "RAF" professional team disbanded, and thus women's football in Latvia continued to exist only at the amateur level.

On 18 August 1993, The Latvian women's national team made its debut and played its first international match in the European Championship qualification tournament, losing in the first match away to Sweden, which was already one of the most important women's football countries in the world at the time.

After the first qualifying tournament, Latvia did not participate anymore in European Championship qualifying tournaments until 2006. Changes had already been introduced in the selection system, by holding the previous preliminary tournament for the weakest European national teams before the qualification, which the Latvian national team never managed to overcome, which meant that Latvia did not have the opportunity to meet the best national women's football teams in Europe for a long time.

After participating in the UEFA Women's Euro 1995 qualifying and withdrew from all qualification until the qualification for the European Championships in 2009.

Latvia's record upon its return to international qualification games was poor. Latvia lost their first two games, against Israel and Bosnia and Herzegovina by three goals, before losing by one goal to Armenia. Mini-tournaments after the qualification disaster proved no better for Latvia. Finishing last, in December 2008, Latvia lost 0–3 to Croatia and 0–5 to Turkey.

=== The first victory ===
Latvia won its first official match on 5 March 2011 over Lithuania in the qualifying 2013 European Championship preliminary round with a lone goal by Jūlija Sokolova. However, Latvia lost the other two games against Luxembourg and Macedonia so the team didn't go through.

=== First World Cup qualification ===
In 2013, the Latvian women's national team took part in the World Cup qualification tournament for the first time, in the first round of the preliminaries, they drew 0:0 with Luxembourg in their debut match, but then lost 0–2 to Albania and Malta. After four years, the Latvian women's national team won the first victory in the World Cup selection, defeating Estonia 4–0 in the preliminaries, but it was not enough to enter the basic qualification tournament, as the first place in the group was won by the national team of Kazakhstan, with whom Latvian football players played a draw 2–2.

== Modern times ==
The Latvian women's football team won its first World Cup qualification victory against Luxembourg. Latvia won its first World Cup qualification victory on 24 June 2022 over Lithuania in the 2023 FIFA Women's World Cup qualification – UEFA Group D with a lone goal by Nelle Treimane.

On November 30, 2021, the Latvian national team lost 20–0 to England in the 2023 FIFA Women's World Cup qualification – UEFA Group D match. After the game, this game received a huge amount of attention, shining a light on the shortcomings of the qualifiers and European women qualifying system. Several experts emphasized that such a game should not have happened. This game again sparked discussions about going back to pre-qualification.

== Stadium ==
In October 2023, Latvian Football Federation president Vadims Ļašenko said that Skonto Stadium would become the main home of the men's team, with Daugava Stadium serving as a backup and the venue for the women's and youth national teams. Previously, the women's team has played in various grounds, including Arkādija Stadium and the LNK Sports Park in Riga, Sloka Stadium in Jūrmala, Zemgale Olympic Center in Jelgava and others.

== Results and fixtures ==
The following is a list of match results in the last 12 months, as well as any future matches that have been scheduled.

Legend

Win Draw Loss Fixture

=== 2025 ===
2 December Friendly	Poland	3–0	Latvia	Gdańsk, Poland
13:30	Sarapata 13', Tomasiak 45', Sobal 90'			Stadium: Gdańsk Sports Center Stadium; Referee: Michalina Diakow (Poland)

=== 2026 ===
3 March 2027 FIFA Women's World Cup qualification	Slovakia	3–2	Latvia	Popard, Slovakia
16:00	Hmírová 7'; Šurnovská 32'; Košíková 60'	Report (FIFA); Report (UEFA)	Poļuhoviča 56'; Ševcova 63'	Stadium: NTC Poprad; Attendance: 707; Referee: Vanja Janković (Slovenia)

7 March 2027 FIFA Women's World Cup qualification	Finland	3–1	Latvia	Helsinki, Finland
13:30 (14:30 UTC+2)	Öling 26', 56'; Sevenius 65'	Report (FIFA); Report (UEFA)	Andersone 90+3'	Stadium: Helsinki Football Stadium; Attendance: 2,471; Referee: Tatyana Sorokopudova (Kazakhstan)

14 April 2027 FIFA Women's World Cup qualification	Latvia	0–3	Portugal	Riga
19:00 (20:00 UTC+3)		Report (FIFA); Report (UEFA)	Nazareth 14', 73'; T. Pinto 18'	Stadium: Daugava Stadium; Attendance: 533; Referee: Laura Mauricio (Switzerland)

18 April 2027 FIFA Women's World Cup qualification	Latvia	0–1	Finland	Riga
19:00 (20:00 UTC+3)		Report (FIFA); Report (UEFA)	Lindström 66'	Stadium: Daugava Stadium; Attendance: 3,554; Referee: Lovisa Johansson (Sweden)

5 June 2027 FIFA Women's World Cup qualification	Portugal	5–0	Latvia	Estoril, Portugal
20:00	Santiago 47'; Capeta 54'; Nazareth 61', 63'; Silva 84'	Report (FIFA); Report (UEFA)		Stadium: Estádio António Coimbra da Mota; Attendance: 2,531; Referee: Olivia Tschon (Austria)

9 June 2027 FIFA Women's World Cup qualification	Latvia	1–2	Slovakia	Riga
20:00	Miksone 45' (pen.)	Report (FIFA); Report (UEFA)	Lemešová 78'; Gondová 90+2'	Stadium: Daugava Stadium; Referee: Nanna Løf Andersen (Denmark)

10 October Friendly	France	9–0	Latvia	Laval, France
21:00	Diani 9'; Le Moguédec 12', 40'; Malard 20'; Geyoro 31'; Hurtré 45+1'; Gago 59'; Mateo 66'; Katoto 82'	Report		Stadium: Stade Francis Le Basser; Attendance: 7,434; Referee: Stacey Pearson (England)

== Coaching staff ==
=== Current coaching staff ===
As of 18 February 2025

Role	Name
Head coach	(Latvia) Liene Vāciete
Assistant coach	(Latvia) Jānis Segliņš
Goalkeeping coach	(Latvia) Dagnis Sausais
Fitness coach	(Latvia) Valērijs Žolnerovičs
Analyst coach	(Latvia) Jēkabs Lagūns
Team doctor	(Latvia) Līga Meija
Team doctor	(Latvia) Mārtiņš Kacens
Team doctor	(Latvia) Karmena Ketija Pozņiaka
Kit manager	(Latvia) Jevgēnijs Vasjukovs
Social media	(Latvia) Abita Tauriņa
Team manager	(Latvia) Marta Lielause

=== Manager history ===
- (Latvia) Viktors Lūkins (1992–1993)
- (Latvia) Vladimirs Serbins (1994–1996)
- (Latvia) Grigorijs Rožkovs (1996–1998)
- (Latvia) Ģirts Marausks (1999–2002)
- (Latvia) Agris Bandolis (2003–2010)
- (Latvia) Didzis Matīss (2010–2021)
- (Latvia) Romāns Kvačovs (2021–2024)
- (Latvia) Liene Vāciete (2025-)

== Players ==
=== Current squad ===
The following players were called up for the 2027 FIFA Women's World Cup qualification matches against Portugal and Slovakia on 5 and 9 June 2026, respectively.

Caps and goals correct as of 9 June 2026, after the match against Slovakia.

No.	Pos.	Player	Date of birth (age)	Caps	Goals	Club
1	GK	Sofija Ņesterova	6 August 2001 (age 25)	24	0	(Polish Football Association) Górnik Łęczna
12	GK	Madara Matrevica	14 March 2006 (age 20)	4	0	(Latvian Football Federation) FK Metta
23	GK	Elza Renāte Strazdiņa	29 December 2006 (age 19)	11	0	(Swedish Football Association) Piteå IF
5	DF	Anna Hropataja	12 May 2005 (age 21)	4	0	(Kazakhstan Football Federation) Aktobe
6	DF	Marina Teļukeviča	19 September 2005 (age 21)	14	0	(Latvian Football Federation) FK RFS
10	DF	Monika Estere Štube	15 September 1999 (age 27)	13	0	(The Football Association) Bradford City
13	DF	Sandra Voitāne	16 September 1999 (age 27)	83	15	(Football Association of Iceland) ÍBV
15	DF	Sofija Gergeležiu	31 August 2003 (age 23)	24	0	(Latvian Football Federation) FK RFS
22	DF	Evelyn Arsenault	15 October 2003 (age 23)	7	0	(Canadian Soccer Association) Ottawa South United
20	DF	Alise Keita Baltrušaite	26 October 2007 (age 19)	1	0	(Latvian Football Federation) FK Iecava
2	MF	Uma Upīte	19 November 2007 (age 19)	8	0	(Latvian Football Federation) FK Metta
3	MF	Amēlija Lipšāne	31 March 2005 (age 21)	12	0	(Latvian Football Federation) FK Metta
4	MF	Gabriela Annija Andersone	31 October 2008 (age 18)	13	2	(Italian Football Federation) US Sassuolo Calcio U19
7	MF	Alīna Ansone	2 February 2006 (age 20)	6	0	(Latvian Football Federation) FK RFS
8	MF	Viktorija Zaičikova	4 August 2000 (age 26)	75	5	(Football Association of Iceland) ÍBV
10	MF	Līva Šteinberga	28 July 2007 (age 19)	1	0	(Latvian Football Federation) Riga FC
11	MF	Diāna Suvitra	9 January 2002 (age 24)	25	3	(Italian Football Federation) Catania
14	MF	Olga Ševcova	29 November 1992 (age 33)	83	16	(Football Association of Iceland) ÍBV
17	MF	Anastasija Vainere	23 September 2004 (age 22)	7	0	(Latvian Football Federation) FK Metta
16	MF	Lizete Dūmiņa	11 March 2008 (age 18)	1	0	(German Football Association) Union Berlin
9	FW	Anastasija Poļuhoviča	6 March 2005 (age 21)	36	7	(Polish Football Association) Pogon Szczecin
18	FW	Santa Sanija Vuškāne	22 November 2005 (age 20)	19	1	(Polish Football Association) GKS Katowice
19	FW	Karlīna Miksone	21 March 2000 (age 26)	83	27	(Polish Football Association) Czarni Sosnowiec
21	FW	Signija Šenberga	13 March 2003 (age 23)	23	0	(Latvian Football Federation) FK RFS

=== Recent call ups ===
The following players have also been called up to the squad within the past 12 months.

Pos.	Player	Date of birth (age)	Caps	Goals	Club	Latest call-up
GK	Aleksandra Torgošova	5 December 2008 (age 17)	0	0	(Latvia) Riga FC	v. Lithuania, 27 October 2025
DF	Renāte Gaugere	21 December 2001 (age 24)	0	0	(Latvia) Riga FC	v. Finland, 18 April 2026
DF	Laura Sondore	29 December 1999 (age 26)	16	0	(Latvia) Riga FC	v. Poland, 2 December 2025
DF	Anastasija Ročāne	7 June 1992 (age 34)	103	4	(Greece) Pyrgos	v. Lithuania, 27 October 2025
MF	Katrīna Daņilova	10 May 2004 (age 22)	17	0	(Latvia) Riga FC	v. Finland, 18 April 2026
MF	Nikola Preijere	12 April 2007 (age 19)	5	0	(Latvia) Riga FC	v. Finland, 18 April 2026
MF	Alise Gindra	4 June 2006 (age 20)	1	0	(England) Huddersfield	v. Finland, 18 April 2026
MF	Anastasija Čemirtāne	17 October 1999 (age 27)	25	1	(Latvia) FK RFS	v. Finland, 7 March 2026
MF	Anna Marija Valaka	14 November 1999 (age 27)	25	0	(Latvia) FK RFS	v. Finland, 7 March 2026
Notes: ^{INJ} = Withdrew due to injury; ^{MED} = Withdrew due to medical reasons; ^{PRE} = Preliminary squad

== Records ==
As of 9 June 2026

Players in bold are still active with the national team.

=== Most Appearances ===
Rank	Player	Career	Caps	Goals
1	**Anastasija Ročāne**	2011–present	103	4
2	**Karlīna Miksone**	2015–present	83	27
2	**Olga Ševcova**	2011–present	83	16
2	**Sandra Voitāne**	2015–present	83	15
5	**Viktorija Zaičikova**	2017–present	75	5
6	Elīza Spruntule	2011–2021	57	2
7	Renāte Fedotova	2013–2022	52	17
7	Kristīne Giržda	2012–2021	52	2
9	Anna Proposhina	2009–2020	47	0
10	Marija Ibragimova	2012–2019	40	0

=== Top goalscorers ===
Rank	Player	Career	Goals	Caps	Avg.
1	**Karlīna Miksone**	2015–present	27	83	0.33
2	Renāte Fedotova	2013–2022	17	52	0.33
3	**Olga Ševcova**	2009–present	16	83	0.19
4	**Sandra Voitāne**	2015–present	15	83	0.18
5	Liene Vāciete	2015–2017	7	24	0.29
5	**Anastasija Poļuhoviča**	2022–present	7	36	0.19
7	**Viktorija Zaičikova**	2017–present	5	75	0.07
8	Anastasia Fyodorova	2017–2019	4	19	0.21
8	**Anastasija Ročāne**	2011–present	4	103	0.04
10	**Diāna Suvitra**	2023–present	3	25	0.12
10	Ieva Bidermane	2006–2018	3	37	0.08

== Competitive record ==
=== FIFA Women's World Cup ===
FIFA Women's World Cup record									Qualification record						
Year	Result	Pld	W	D*	L	GF	GA	GD	Pld	W	D*	L	GF	GA	GD
(China) 1991	Did not exist								Did not exist						
(Sweden) 1995	Did not qualify								UEFA Euro 1995						
(United States) 1999	Did not enter								Did not enter						
(United States) 2003	Did not enter								Did not enter						
(China) 2007	Did not enter								Did not enter						
(Germany) 2011	Did not enter								Did not enter						
(Canada) 2015	Did not qualify								3	0	1	2	0	4	–4
(France) 2019	Did not qualify								3	1	2	0	7	3	+4
(Australia) (New Zealand) 2023	Did not qualify								10	1	0	9	8	63	–55
(Brazil) 2027	Did not qualify								6	0	0	6	4	17	–13
(Costa Rica) (Jamaica) (Mexico) (United States) 2031	To be determined								To be determined						
(United Kingdom) 2035	To be determined								To be determined						
Total	–	–	–	–	–	–	–	–	16	2	3	11	15	70	-55

*Draws include knockout matches decided on penalty kicks.

=== UEFA Women's Championship ===
UEFA Women's Championship record								Qualifying record							
Year	Result	Pld	W	D*	L	GF	GA	Pld	W	D*	L	GF	GA	P/R	Rnk
1984 to (Italy) 1993	Did not exist							Did not exist							
(England) (Germany) (Norway) (Sweden) 1995	Did not qualify							4	0	0	4	1	18	–	
(Norway) (Sweden) 1997	Did not enter							Did not enter							
(Germany) 2001	Did not enter							Did not enter							
(England) 2005	Did not enter							Did not enter							
(Finland) 2009	Did not qualify							3	0	0	3	1	8	–	
(Sweden) 2013	Did not qualify							3	1	0	2	1	3	–	
(Netherlands) 2017	Did not qualify							3	1	1	1	5	5	–	
(England) 2022	Did not qualify							8	0	0	8	2	39	–	
(Switzerland) 2025	Did not qualify							6	3	0	3	8	16	(Note: From Euro 2025 onwards a new qualifying format was introduced, linked to the Women's Nations League where teams are divided into leagues with promotion/relegation between the leagues at the end of each cycle.)	42nd
(Germany) 2029	To be determined							To be determined							
Total	–	–	–	–	–	–	–	27	5	1	21	18	89	42nd	

*Draws include knockout matches decided on penalty kicks.

=== UEFA Women's Nations League ===
UEFA Women's Nations League record
Year	League	Group	Pos	Pld	W	D	L	GF	GA	P/R	Rnk
2023–24	C	1	2nd	8	3	1	4	17	15	*	38th
2025	C	6	To be determined								
Total				8	3	1	4	17	15	38th	

▲	Promoted at end of season
Same position	No movement at end of season
▼	Relegated at end of season
*	Participated in promotion/relegation play-offs

=== Women's Baltic Cup ===
Baltic Cup record
Year	Result
1996	Runners-up
1997	Champions
1998	Third place
2003	Third place
2004	Third place
2005	Third place
2006	Third place
2007	Third place
2008	Third place
2009	Third place
2010	Third place
2011	Champions
2012	Third place
2013	Third place
2014	Third place
2015	Third place
2016	Runners-up
2017	Champions
2018	Champions
2019	Champions
2021	Fourth place
2022	Fourth place
Total	21/21

== See also ==
- Sport in Latvia
  - Football in Latvia
    - Women's football in Latvia
- Latvia women's national football team
  - Latvia women's national football team results
  - List of Latvia women's international footballers
- Latvia women's national under-19 football team
- Latvia women's national under-17 football team
- Latvia men's national football team
