= Rīgas FS =

- Full name: Rīgas Futbola skola
- Founded: 1962 (main organization); 2013 (women's team)
- Ground: Sporta bāze "Daugavgrīva" (Daugavgrīva Sports Base)
- Manager: Didzis Matīss
- League: Latvian Women's League
- 2025: Latvian Women's League, 7th
Home colours	Away colours

Rīgas Futbola skola (Latvian for Riga Football School, also Rīgas FS or RFS) is a Latvian women's professional football club from Riga. The team is the women's section of the Riga Football School youth academy, founded in 1962 and owned by the Riga City Council (the senior team of which currently plays in the Latvian Third League). By 2013, a women's team of the school had been created.

The women play in the top level Latvian Women's League and won the championship from 2013 to 2018, and then in 2020 and 2021.

The similarly named RFS Women team (formerly SFK Rīga or SFK RFS until 2024) is the female section of the men's Virslīga side RFS, which was founded in 2021–2022 as the nucleus of the Rīgas FS squad with most of the players was spun off under the leadership of FK RFS. The remaining players continued playing for Rīgas FS.

Rīgas FS also fielded a farm team in the top league called RFS/46. vsk in partnership with the Riga Secondary School No. 46 football academy in 2015 and 2016.

== Titles ==
- Latvian Women's League:
  - Winners (8): 2013, 2014, 2015, 2016, 2017, 2018, 2020, 2021
- Latvian Women's Cup
  - Winners (6): 2014, 2015, 2016, 2017, 2018, 2019

== Current squad ==
As of 18 August 2021

Goalkeepers	Defenders	Midfielders	Forwards
1. (Latvia) Ana Dubova; 12. (Latvia) Marija Ibragimova	3. (Latvia) Anna Krūmiņa; 18. (Latvia) Karīna Lūse; 20. (Latvia) Veronika Širmanova; 30. (Latvia) Jūlija Ņikiforova	5. (Latvia) Olga Gerasimenko; 8. (Latvia) Stella Jemeļjanova; 13. (Latvia) Sofija Seredina; 15. (Latvia) Natālija Gromova; 19. (Latvia) Margarita Ņikiforova; 21. (Latvia) Anastasija Čemirtāne	2. (Latvia) Laima Kirtovska; 4. (Latvia) Nadežda Ciplakova; 9. (Latvia) Tatjana Baļičeva; 14. (Latvia) Ieva Krasnova; 22. (Latvia) Inga Zvonkova

- Head coach: Didzis Matīss

== UEFA competition record ==
Season	Competition	Stage	Result	Opponent
2014–15	Champions League	Qualifying	0–11	(Turkey) Konak Belediyespor
2014–15	Champions League	Qualifying	0–2	(Switzerland) Zürich
2014–15	Champions League	Qualifying	0–7	(Belarus) FC Minsk
2015–16	Champions League	Qualifying	1–4	(Ukraine) Zhytlobud Kharkiv
2015–16	Champions League	Qualifying	0–9	(Finland) PK-35 Vantaa
2015–16	Champions League	Qualifying	3–2	(Slovakia) Nové Zámky
2017–18	Champions League	Qualifying	0–6	(Netherlands) Ajax
2017–18	Champions League	Qualifying	0–8	(Belgium) Standard Liège
2017–18	Champions League	Qualifying	0–2	(Finland) Pärnu JK
