= SFK Rīga =

Former Latvian women's association football club

- Full name: Sieviešu futbola klubs "Rīga"
- Founded: 2021
- Dissolved: 2024
- Ground: Jānis Skredelis' Stadium
- Capacity: 250
- Manager: Mihails Zemļinskis
- League: Latvian Women's League
- 2023: 1st of 10
- Website: https://sfkrfs.com

SFK Rīga was a Latvian women's football club based in Riga, Latvia. It competed in the Latvian Women's League, the top flight of Latvian football, and the Latvian Women's Cup. It was associated with the professional men's team FK RFS.

Named SFK RFS from March to December 2021, SFK Rīga was founded as a spinoff of the Rīgas Futbola skola team, and began play in the 2022 season. The club was built upon the previous Rīgas FS champions squad, gaining most of the key players, while the rest continued to play as Rīgas FS/RFS. SFK Rīga clinched the Women's League title in its inaugural 2022 season and repeated its success in 2023.

On 1 March 2024, SFK Rīga was renamed RFS Women, with the team becoming a fully-fledged section of FK RFS.

== Titles ==
- Latvian Women's League:
  - Winners (1): 2022, 2023
- Latvian Women's Cup
  - Winners (1): 2021
  - Runners-up (1): 2023

== European record ==
Season	Competition	Round	Club	Home	Away	Agg.
2023–24	UEFA Women's Champions League	1 - Semi-final	(Kazakhstan) BIIK Shymkent		1–0	1–0
		1 - Final	(Portugal) S.L. Benfica		0–4	0–4
