= 2020 Pinatar Cup squads =

List of players competing at the 1st edition of the Pinatar Cup

This article lists the squads for the 2020 Pinatar Cup, the inaugural edition of the Pinatar Cup. The cup consisted of a series of friendly games, and was held in Spain from 4 to 10 March 2020. The four national teams involved in the tournament registered a squad of 23 players.

The age listed for each player is on 4 March 2020, the first day of the tournament. The numbers of caps and goals listed for each player do not include any matches played after the start of tournament. The club listed is the club for which the player last played a competitive match prior to the tournament. The nationality for each club reflects the national association (not the league) to which the club is affiliated. A flag is included for coaches that are of a different nationality than their own national team.

== Squads ==
=== Iceland ===
Coach: Jón Þór Hauksson

The squad was announced on 13 February 2020. Milan-based Berglind Björg Þorvaldsdóttir withdrew from the squad due to coronavirus fears and was replaced by Sandra Jessen on 27 February 2020. Alexandra Jóhannsdóttir withdrew from the squad with injury and was replaced by Hildur Antonsdóttir on 28 February 2020.

No.	Pos.	Player	Date of birth (age)	Caps	Goals	Club
1	GK	Sandra Sigurðardóttir	2 October 1986 (aged 33)	27	0	(Football Association of Iceland) Valur
2	DF	Guðný Árnadóttir	4 August 2000 (aged 19)	5	0	(Football Association of Iceland) Valur
3	DF	Anna Rakel Pétursdóttir	24 August 1998 (aged 21)	6	0	(Swedish Football Association) IK Uppsala
4	DF	Glódís Perla Viggósdóttir	27 June 1995 (aged 24)	81	6	(Swedish Football Association) Rosengård
5	MF	Gunnhildur Yrsa Jónsdóttir	28 September 1988 (aged 31)	68	9	(United States Soccer Federation) Utah Royals
6	DF	Ingibjörg Sigurðardóttir	7 October 1997 (aged 22)	27	0	(Norwegian Football Federation) Vålerenga
7	MF	Sara Björk Gunnarsdóttir	29 September 1990 (aged 29)	129	20	(German Football Association) VfL Wolfsburg
8	MF	Sigríður Lára Garðarsdóttir	11 March 1994 (aged 25)	18	0	(Football Association of Iceland) FH
9	DF	Elísa Viðarsdóttir	26 May 1991 (aged 28)	36	0	(Football Association of Iceland) Valur
10	MF	Dagný Brynjarsdóttir	10 August 1991 (aged 28)	85	25	(Football Association of Iceland) Selfoss
11	DF	Hallbera Guðný Gísladóttir	14 September 1986 (aged 33)	109	3	(Football Association of Iceland) Valur
12	GK	Ingibjörg Valgeirsdóttir	14 January 1998 (aged 22)	0	0	(Football Association of Iceland) KR Reykjavík
13	GK	Cecilía Rán Rúnarsdóttir	26 July 2003 (aged 16)	0	0	(Football Association of Iceland) Fylkir
14	MF	Hlín Eiríksdóttir	12 July 2000 (aged 19)	12	3	(Football Association of Iceland) Valur
15	MF	Hildur Antonsdóttir	18 September 1995 (aged 24)	0	0	(Football Association of Iceland) Breiðablik
16	FW	Elín Metta Jensen	1 March 1995 (aged 25)	46	14	(Football Association of Iceland) Valur
17	MF	Agla María Albertsdóttir	5 August 1999 (aged 20)	27	2	(Football Association of Iceland) Breiðablik
18	FW	Sandra Jessen	28 January 1995 (aged 25)	28	6	(German Football Association) Bayer Leverkusen
19	DF	Berglind Rós Ágústsdóttir	28 July 1995 (aged 24)	0	0	(Football Association of Iceland) Fylkir
21	FW	Svava Rós Guðmundsdóttir	11 November 1995 (aged 24)	19	1	(Swedish Football Association) Kristianstad
22	MF	Rakel Hönnudóttir	30 December 1988 (aged 31)	100	9	(Football Association of Iceland) Breiðablik
23	FW	Fanndís Friðriksdóttir	9 May 1990 (aged 29)	106	17	(Football Association of Iceland) Valur
24	DF	Natasha Anasi	2 October 1991 (aged 28)	0	0	(Football Association of Iceland) Keflavík

=== Northern Ireland ===
Coach: Kenny Shiels

The squad was announced on 22 February 2020.

No.	Pos.	Player	Date of birth (age)	Caps	Goals	Club
1	GK	Jackie Burns	6 March 1997 (aged 22)	12	0	(Football Association of Iceland) ÍBV
2	DF	Rachel Newborough	19 November 1996 (aged 23)	18	0	(The Football Association) Charlton Athletic
3	DF	Demi Vance	2 May 1991 (aged 28)	53	1	(Scottish Football Association) Rangers
4	MF	Sarah McFadden	23 May 1987 (aged 32)	60	4	(The Football Association) Durham
5	DF	Julie Nelson	4 June 1985 (aged 34)	102	7	(Irish Football Association) Crusaders Strikers
6	DF	Ashley Hutton	2 November 1987 (aged 32)	95	8	(Irish Football Association) Linfield
7	MF	Chloe McCarron	22 December 1997 (aged 22)	0	0	(Irish Football Association) Linfield
8	MF	Marissa Callaghan	2 September 1985 (aged 34)	47	6	(Irish Football Association) Cliftonville
9	FW	Simone Magill	1 November 1994 (aged 25)	49	10	(The Football Association) Everton
10	MF	Rachel Furness	19 June 1988 (aged 31)	61	17	(The Football Association) Liverpool
11	FW	Lauren Wade	22 November 1993 (aged 26)	19	1	(Scottish Football Association) Glasgow City
12	GK	Lilie Crooks	2003 (age 22–23)	0	0	(Irish Football Association) Mid-Ulster
13	DF	Kelsie Burrows	22 February 2001 (aged 19)			(The Football Association) Blackburn Rovers
14	DF	Toni Leigh Finnegan	16 October 2002 (aged 17)			(Irish Football Association) Cliftonville
15	MF	Danielle Maxwell	9 April 2002 (aged 17)	0	0	(Irish Football Association) Glentoran Belfast United
16	MF	Emma McMaster	9 March 1999 (aged 20)			(Irish Football Association) Glentoran Belfast United
17	FW	Casey Howe	2 September 2002 (aged 17)			(Irish Football Association) Linfield
18	FW	Megan Bell	17 April 2001 (aged 18)	8	1	(Scottish Football Association) Rangers
19	FW	Caitlin McGuinness	30 August 2002 (aged 17)			(Irish Football Association) Linfield
20	MF	Rebecca McKenna	13 April 2001 (aged 18)	2	0	(Irish Football Association) Linfield

=== Scotland ===
Coach: Shelley Kerr

The squad was announced on 18 February 2020. Nicola Docherty and Amy Muir replaced Chloe Arthur and Jen Beattie on 29 February 2020.

No.	Pos.	Player	Date of birth (age)	Caps	Goals	Club
1	GK	Lee Alexander	23 September 1991 (aged 28)	22	0	(Scottish Football Association) Glasgow City
2	DF	Kirsty Smith	6 January 1994 (aged 26)	39	0	(The Football Association) Manchester United
3	DF	Emma Mitchell	19 September 1992 (aged 27)	60	7	(The Football Association) Tottenham Hotspur
4	DF	Rachel Corsie (captain)	17 August 1989 (aged 30)	114	16	(United States Soccer Federation) Utah Royals
5	DF	Nicola Docherty	23 August 1992 (aged 27)	21	0	(Scottish Football Association) Rangers
6	MF	Rachael Boyle	20 December 1991 (aged 28)	31	0	(Scottish Football Association) Hibernian
7	DF	Hayley Lauder	4 June 1990 (aged 29)	101	9	(Scottish Football Association) Glasgow City
9	MF	Caroline Weir	20 June 1995 (aged 24)	68	9	(The Football Association) Manchester City
10	MF	Leanne Crichton	6 August 1987 (aged 32)	66	3	(Scottish Football Association) Glasgow City
12	GK	Shannon Lynn	22 October 1985 (aged 34)	30	0	(Swedish Football Association) Vittsjö
13	FW	Jane Ross	18 September 1989 (aged 30)	130	60	(The Football Association) Manchester United
14	MF	Amy Muir	7 March 2000 (aged 19)	0	0	(Scottish Football Association) Hibernian
15	DF	Sophie Howard	17 September 1993 (aged 26)	16	1	(The Football Association) Reading
16	MF	Christie Murray	3 May 1990 (aged 29)	63	5	(The Football Association) Liverpool
17	FW	Abbi Grant	11 December 1995 (aged 24)	4	0	(The Football Association) Birmingham City
18	FW	Claire Emslie	8 March 1994 (aged 25)	26	6	(Football Australia) Melbourne City
19	FW	Martha Thomas	31 May 1996 (aged 23)	0	0	(The Football Association) West Ham United
20	MF	Lucy Graham	10 October 1996 (aged 23)	3	0	(The Football Association) Everton
21	GK	Jenna Fife	1 December 1995 (aged 24)	4	0	(Scottish Football Association) Rangers
22	FW	Erin Cuthbert	19 July 1998 (aged 21)	34	12	(The Football Association) Chelsea
23	MF	Lizzie Arnot	1 March 1996 (aged 24)	29	2	(The Football Association) Manchester United
24	MF	Samantha Kerr	17 April 1999 (aged 20)	0	0	(Scottish Football Association) Glasgow City
25	DF	Hannah Godfrey	17 July 1997 (aged 22)	1	1	(The Football Association) Tottenham Hotspur
	FW	Lisa Evans	21 May 1992 (aged 27)	83	17	(The Football Association) Arsenal

=== Ukraine ===
Coach: Natalya Zinchenko

The squad was announced on 25 February 2020.

No.	Pos.	Player	Date of birth (age)	Caps	Goals	Club
1	GK	Daryna Bondarchuk	20 May 1998 (aged 21)	0	0	(Ukrainian Association of Football) Zhytlobud-2 Kharkiv
2	DF	Iryna Podolska	14 March 1995 (aged 24)	5	0	(Ukrainian Association of Football) Zhytlobud-2 Kharkiv
3	DF	Yana Derkach	10 July 1998 (aged 21)	0	0	(Ukrainian Association of Football) Lehenda Chernihiv
4	DF	Anastasia Filenko	1 November 1990 (aged 29)	14	0	(Lithuanian Football Federation) Gintra Universitetas
5	MF	Veronika Andrukhiv	5 May 1996 (aged 23)	12	0	(Ukrainian Association of Football) Zhytlobud-2 Kharkiv
6	DF	Olha Basanska	6 January 1992 (aged 28)	24	0	(Ukrainian Association of Football) Zhytlobud-1 Kharkiv
7	MF	Yana Kalinina	14 November 1994 (aged 25)	16	1	(Ukrainian Association of Football) Zhytlobud-2 Kharkiv
8	MF	Tetyana Kitayeva	28 October 1995 (aged 24)	6	0	(Ukrainian Association of Football) Zhytlobud-2 Kharkiv
9	FW	Nicole Kozlova	8 July 2000 (aged 19)	2	0	(United States Soccer Federation) Virginia Tech Hokies
10	FW	Nadiia Kunina	29 March 2000 (aged 19)	6	0	(Ukrainian Association of Football) Zhytlobud-1 Kharkiv
11	MF	Tetyana Romanenko	3 October 1990 (aged 29)	44	9	(French Football Federation) Stade de Reims
12	GK	Iryna Sanina	8 October 1985 (aged 34)	1	0	(Ukrainian Association of Football) Zhytlobud-1 Kharkiv
13	DF	Natia Pantsulaia	28 December 1991 (aged 28)	10	0	(Royal Spanish Football Federation) Atlético Madrid
14	DF	Lyubov Shmatko	25 October 1993 (aged 26)	5	1	(Football Federation of Belarus) FC Minsk
15	MF	Anna Petryk	26 October 1997 (aged 22)	1	0	(Ukrainian Association of Football) Zhytlobud-1 Kharkiv
16	MF	Olha Ovdiychuk	16 December 1993 (aged 26)	31	5	(Royal Spanish Football Federation) Atlético Madrid
17	MF	Daryna Apanashchenko	16 May 1986 (aged 33)	45	27	(Croatian Football Federation) ŽNK Split
20	FW	Valentina Tarakanova	28 May 1996 (aged 23)	4	0	(Polish Football Association) Stomil Olsztyn
21	MF	Tamila Khimich	13 September 1994 (aged 25)	15	0	(Football Federation of Belarus) FC Minsk
22	DF	Darya Kravets	21 March 1994 (aged 25)	21	2	(French Football Federation) Stade de Reims
23	GK	Kateryna Samson	5 July 1988 (aged 31)	19	0	(Ukrainian Association of Football) Zhytlobud-2 Kharkiv
	FW	Victoria Jilin	24 October 2000 (aged 19)	0	0	(Ukrainian Association of Football) Ladomir

== Player representation ==
=== By club ===
Clubs with three or more players represented are listed.

Players	Club
7	(Iceland) Valur
6	(Ukraine) Zhytlobud-2 Kharkiv
5	(Northern Ireland) Linfield, (Scotland) Glasgow City
4	(Scotland) Rangers, (Ukraine) Zhytlobud-1 Kharkiv
3	(England) Manchester United, (Iceland) Breiðablik

=== By club nationality ===
Players	Clubs
18	England
17	Iceland
12	Ukraine
11	Northern Ireland, Scotland
5	Sweden
3	United States
2	Belarus, France, Germany, Spain
1	Australia, Croatia, Lithuania, Norway, Poland

=== By club federation ===
Players	Federation
85	UEFA
3	CONCACAF
1	AFC

=== By representatives of domestic league ===
National squad	Players
Iceland	16
Ukraine	12
Northern Ireland	11
Scotland	8
