= 2021–22 Ukrainian Women's Higher League =

Ukrainian Women's League
- Season: 2021–22
- Champions: none
- UEFA Women's Champions League: Zhytlobud-2 Kharkiv

The 2021–22 season of the Ukrainian Football Championship was the 31st season of Ukraine's top women's football league. Consisting of two tiers it started on 31 July 2021, and was scheduled to end in May 2022.

Due to the 2022 wide scale Russian invasion of Ukraine, the competition was interrupted halfway and later abandoned as hostilities continued. It was decided to turn current competition standings into final standings with no official winners.

WFC Zhytlobud-1 Kharkiv were the defending champions.

== Format ==
The format of competitions for the season changed again for both tiers, but not significantly. First of all the Ukrainian Association of Football found a consensus among Ukrainian male football clubs to adopt a female (women) team in each professional club. Another important event took place when Kryvbas signed an agreement with the Mykolaiv club "Nika" swapping places with it and entering the top tier instead of starting from the second. It was decided to expand the second tier doubling the tier in size by adding the newly created teams of existing male football clubs with intention to provide the goal of 12 teams in the top tier.

For the top tier (Vyshcha Liha) the twelve teams play a single round robin and then split into two groups with the first six competing in a double round robin for championship and the other six for relegation. The bottom two teams were to be relegated and the 10th placed team is expected to contest in two game play-off with the second-tier team to remain in the top tier.

The second tier (Persha Liha) is split in two groups of 10 teams and begin on 15 August 2021. Both groups play in simple double round robin with the top teams from both groups contest the championship title, while their runners-up will play-off for the 3rd place which then contest promotion play-off.

Participation of the top-tier teams in the Ukrainian Women's Cup is mandatory, while the other teams must compete only if voluntarily agreed to play. The UAF has warned of sanctions for the teams that registered to play in the cup competition, but decided not to show up.

== Vyshcha Liha teams ==
Locations of teams in the 2021–22 Ukrainian Championship Higher League

=== Team changes ===
Promoted	Relegated
Kolos Kovalivka; Ateks Kyiv; Kryvbas Kryvyi Rih (past the 2nd tier)	Nika Mykolaiv; Bukovynska Nadia (withdrew)

- Kryvbas Kryvyi Rih and Nika Mykolaiv signed a partnership agreement, after which Kryvbas entered top tier, while Nika started at the second.

=== Stadiums ===
The top stadium is a home turf, while second if available used during this season.

Team	Home city	Home ground	Capacity
Ateks	Shchaslyve (Irpin)	Arsenal Arena Stadion Chempion	N/A 2,000
Karpaty	Vynnyky (Lviv)	Stadion im.Markevycha Sokil Stadium	900 N/A
Kolos	Kalynivka	Stadion Tsentralnyi	N/A
Kryvbas	Kryvyi Rih	Stadion Hirnyk	2,500
Ladomyr	Novovolynsk	Stadion Shakhtar	N/A
Mariupol	Mariupol	Stadion Zakhidnyi Stadion Azovets	3,063 1,660
Pantery	Uman	Tsentralny Stadion	7,552
EMS Podillia	Vinnytsia	Stadion PCY	1,500
Voskhod	Oleshky (Nova Kakhovka)	Stadion Start Stadion Enerhiya	N/A 4,000
Zhytlobud-1	Liubotyn (Zmiiv)	Stadion Olimpiyets Stadion Avanhard	1,500 N/A
Zhytlobud-2	Kharkiv (Nyzhni Mlyny)	Stadion Nova Bavaria Vorskla-Zmina	2,057 N/A

=== Managers ===
Club	Head coach	Replaced coach
Ateks Kyiv	(Ukraine) Alla Hres	
Karpaty Lviv	(Ukraine) Nadiya Chaika	
Kolos Kovalivka	(Ukraine) Lyudmyla Pokotylo	
Kryvbas Kryvyi Rih	(Ukraine) Alina Stetsenko	
Ladomyr Volodymyr-Volynskyi	(Ukraine) Oleh Bortnik	
Mariupol	(Ukraine) Karina Kulakovska	
Pantery Uman	(Ukraine) Yuriy Dereniuk	
EMS Podillia Vinnytsia	(Ukraine) Oleksandr Dudnik	
Voskhod Stara Maiachka	(Ukraine) Serhiy Sapronov	
Zhytlobud-1 Kharkiv	(Ukraine) Valentyna Kotyk	
Zhytlobud-2 Kharkiv	(Ukraine) Natalya Zinchenko	

== First stage ==
=== League table ===
Pos	Team	Pld	W	D	L	GF	GA	GD	Pts	Qualification or relegation
1	Zhytlobud-2 Kharkiv	10	10	0	0	58	2	+56	30	Qualification for the Champions League qualifying first round
2	Zhytlobud-1 Kharkiv	10	9	0	1	67	5	+62	27	Withdrew
3	Kryvbas Kryvyi Rih	10	7	1	2	26	7	+19	22	
4	Mariupol	10	5	1	4	15	21	−6	16	
5	Kolos Kovalivka	10	5	0	5	12	14	−2	15	
6	Ladomyr Volodymyr-Volynskyi	10	4	2	4	22	20	+2	14	
7	EMS Podillia Vinnytsia	10	4	1	5	9	25	−16	13 (Note: Head-to-head points: Podillia 3, Voskhod 0)	
8	Voskhod Stara Maiachka	10	4	1	5	11	18	−7	13	Withdrew
9	Pantery Uman	10	2	0	8	10	46	−36	6 (Note: Head-to-head points: Pantery 3, Karpaty 0)	
10	Karpaty Lviv	10	2	0	8	13	37	−24	6	Withdrew
11	Ateks Kyiv	10	0	0	10	3	51	−48	0	

Source: womensfootball.com.ua
Rules for classification: 1) Points; 2) Head-to-head points; 3) Head-to-head goal difference; 4) Head-to-head goals scored; 5) Goal difference; 6) Goals scored.

=== Results ===
Home \ Away	KAR	LAD	MAR	KOL	PAN	POD	VSM	ZH1	ZH2	ATX	KRY
Karpaty Lviv		0–5			3–4	1–4			0–7	3–1	
Ladomyr Volodymyr-Volynskyi			2–2				0–3	0–5		7–2	0–1
Mariupol	2–3			1–0		1–0			0–3		
Kolos Kovalivka	2–0	0–1			1–0	2–0			0–3		
Pantery Uman		2–7	1–2			0–3					1–4
EMS Podillia Vinnytsia		0–0					1–0	0–9		1–0	
Voskhod Stara Maiachka	1–0		1–2	0–2	3–0			0–6			1–1
Zhytlobud-1 Kharkiv	7–3		8–0	7–0	15–0				1–2		2–0
Zhytlobud-2 Kharkiv		5–0			8–0	8–0	6–0			14–0	
Ateks Kyiv			0–4	0–5	0–2		0–2	0–7			0–6
Kryvbas Kryvyi Rih	4–0		3–1	2–0		4–0			1–2		

Source: WFPL.UA
Legend: Blue = home team win; Yellow = draw; Red = away team win.

== Statistics ==
=== Top scorers ===
Rank	Player	Club	Goals
1	(Ukraine) Olha Ovdiychuk	Zhytlobud-1 Kharkiv	19 (1)
2	(Ukraine) Roksolana Kravchuk	Zhytlobud-2 Kharkiv	13
3	(Ukraine) Veronika Andrukhiv	Zhytlobud-2 Kharkiv	11
4	(Ukraine) Olha Boychenko	Zhytlobud-1 Kharkiv	10
4	(Ukraine) Khrystyna Pereviznyk	Ladomyr Volodymyr-Volynskyi	10
4	(Ukraine) Yana Malakhova	Zhytlobud-2 Kharkiv	10
7	(Ukraine) Yuliya Shevchuk	Zhytlobud-1 Kharkiv	8
8	(Bosnia and Herzegovina) Dajana Spasojević	Zhytlobud-1 Kharkiv	6
8	(Gabon) Aristel Jog-Etauf	Mariupol	6
8	(Ukraine) Inna Hlushchenko	Kryvbas Kryvyi Rih	6 (1)
8	(Ukraine) Yana Kalinina	Zhytlobud-2 Kharkiv	6 (2)

== Persha Liha teams ==
Locations of teams in the 2021–22 Ukrainian Championship First League

=== Team changes ===
Promoted to Vyshcha Liha	Relegated from Vyshcha Liha
Kolos Kovalivka; Ateks Kyiv	Nika Mykolaiv
Entering league competitions	Leaving league competitions
DIuSSh-26 Kyiv; DIuSSh-1 Khmelnytskyi; Iatran Berestivets; Chempion Ternopil; Ladomyr-2 Volodymyr-Volynskyi; Dnipro-1; Bahira Kropyvnytskyi; Shakhtar Donetsk; Chornomorets Odesa; Vorskla Poltava; Persha Stolytsia Kharkiv	Kharkivskyi Koledzh

=== Name changes ===
- KhPKSP (Kharkiv Professional College of Sports Specialization) changed its name to Kharkivskyi Koledzh.
- OKIP (Piddubnyi Olympic College) changed its name to Dynamo-OKIP Kyiv.
- Rodyna Kostopil reorganized into Veres Rivne.

== Persha Liha ==
=== Group A ===
Pos	Team	Pld	W	D	L	GF	GA	GD	Pts	
1	Dynamo Kyiv	9	7	2	0	36	7	+29	23 (Note: Goal difference: Dynamo 29, D-26 21)	Promoted to the 2022–23 Vyshcha Liha
2	DIuSSh-26 Kyiv	10	7	2	1	29	8	+21	23	Withdrew
3	Veres Rivne	7	7	0	0	38	0	+38	21	Promoted to the 2022–23 Vyshcha Liha
4	Prykarpattia-DIuSSh-3 Iv.Frankivsk	9	4	2	3	10	13	−3	14	
5	Iantarochka Novoiavorivsk	10	4	1	5	18	21	−3	13	
6	Iatran Berestivets	10	4	0	6	12	26	−14	12	Withdrew
7	Ladomyr-2 Volodymyr-Volynskyi (Note: Ladomyr-2 Volodymyr-Volynskyi had 3 points deducted for no show to the Round 7 away match with Dynamo Kyiv.)	9	1	4	4	11	15	−4	4 (Note: Head-to-head points: Ladomyr-2 3, D-1 0)	Withdrew
8	DIuSSh-1 Khmelnytskyi	10	1	1	8	7	44	−37	4	Withdrew
9	Chempion Ternopil	10	0	2	8	5	32	−27	2	

Source: womensfootball.com.ua
Rules for classification: 1) Points; 2) Head-to-head points; 3) Head-to-head goal difference; 4) Head-to-head goals scored; 5) Goal difference; 6) Goals scored.

=== Group B ===
Pos	Team	Pld	W	D	L	GF	GA	GD	Pts	
1	Shakhtar Donetsk	10	10	0	0	89	0	+89	30	Promoted to the 2022–23 Vyshcha Liha
2	Dnipro-1	9	8	0	1	58	4	+54	24	Promoted to the 2022–23 Vyshcha Liha
3	Iunist-ShVSM Chernihiv	10	5	2	3	15	24	−9	17	
4	Vorskla Poltava (Note: Vorskla Poltava replaced Kharkivskyi Koledzh which was a second squad of WFC Zhytlobud-2 Kharkiv)	10	5	0	5	24	30	−6	15	Promoted to the 2022–23 Vyshcha Liha
5	Persha Stolytsia Kharkiv (Note: Persha Stolytsia Kharkiv is a junior squad of WFC Zhytlobud-1 Kharkiv)	9	4	2	3	22	20	+2	14	Withdrew
6	Chornomorets Odesa	10	3	2	5	11	29	−18	11	Withdrew
7	Kobra Bilokurakyne (Note: On 10 January 2023 Kobra Bilokurakyne was noticed to represent the Luhansk People's Republic in Belgorod, Russian Federation as Kobra LNR.)	9	2	1	6	23	48	−25	7 (Note: Head-to-head points: Kobra 3, Bahira 0)	Withdrew
8	Bahira Kropyvnytskyi	10	2	1	7	7	36	−29	7	Withdrew
9	Nika Mykolaiv	9	0	0	9	2	60	−58	0	Withdrew

Source: womensfootball.com.ua
Rules for classification: 1) Points; 2) Head-to-head points; 3) Head-to-head goal difference; 4) Head-to-head goals scored; 5) Goal difference; 6) Goals scored.

=== Top scorer ===
Group A

Rank	Player	Club	Goals
1	(Ukraine) Tetyana Polyukhovych	Veres Kostopil/Rivne	11 (1)
2	(Ukraine) Hanna Myronchuk	Dynamo Kyiv	10 (2)
3	(Ukraine) Yuliya Hnydiuk	DIuSSh-26 Kyiv	7 (1)

Group B

Rank	Player	Club	Goals
1	(Ukraine) Polina Yanchuk	Shakhtar Donetsk	25 (2)
2	(Ukraine) Lyudmila Kunina	Dnipro-1	16 (2)
3	(Moldova) Veronica Cojuhari	Shakhtar Donetsk	15
