= 2020–21 Vyshcha Liha (women) =

Ukrainian Women's League
- Season: 2020–21
- Champions: WFC Zhytlobud-1 Kharkiv
- Relegated: Nika Mykolaiv; Bukovynska Nadia
- UEFA Women's Champions League: WFC Zhytlobud-1 Kharkiv

The 2020–21 season of the Ukrainian Football Championship was the 30th season of Ukraine's top women's football league. Consisting of two tiers it ran from 28 August 2020 to 29 May 2021.

The format of competitions for the season changed for both tiers. The ten teams play a single round robin and then split into two groups with the first six competing in a double round robin for championship and the other four for relegation. The bottom two teams were to be relegated. The second tier that also consisted of ten teams had all teams playing each other in a straight double round robin. The top two teams were to be promoted.

== Vyshcha Liha teams ==
Locations of teams in the 2020–21 Ukrainian Championship Higher League

=== Team changes ===
| Promoted from 2019 to 2020 Persha Liha | Relegated from 2019 to 2020 Vyshcha Liha |
|---|---|
| Karpaty Lviv; Bukovynska Nadia Velykyi Kuchuriv; Spartak-Orion Mykolaiv | Iatran Berestivets (dissolved); Rodyna Kostopil; Iednist-ShVSM Plysky (reorganized) |

=== Name changes ===
- During winter break Spartak-Orion Mykolaiv changed to Nika Mykolaiv.
- Mariupolchanka Mariupol changed to Mariupol.

=== Stadiums ===
| Team | Home city | Home ground | Capacity |
|---|---|---|---|
| B.Nadia | Storozhynets Raion | Bukovyna Stadium | 12,000 |
| Karpaty | Lviv | Ukraina Stadium | 28,051 |
| Ladomyr | Volodymyr-Volynskyi | Olimp Stadion | 2,000+ |
| Mariupolchanka | Mariupol | Zakhidnyi Stadion | 3,206 |
| Pantery Uman | Uman | Tsentralny Stadion | 7,552 |
| EMS Podillia | Vinnytsia | Stadion Khimik | 3,282 |
| Rodyna | Berezne | Stadion Kolos | 3,000 |
| Voskhod | Oleshky | Stadion Osvita | |
| Zhytlobud-1 | Vysokyi | Training field Vysokyi | 1,000 |
| Zhytlobud-2 | Kharkiv | Sonyachny Stadium | 4,924 |

=== Managers ===
| Club | Head coach | Replaced coach |
|---|---|---|
| Karpaty Lviv | (Ukraine) Nadiya Chaika | |
| Ladomyr Volodymyr-Volynskyi | (Ukraine) Oleh Bortnik | |
| Mariupolchanka | (Ukraine) Karina Kulakovska | |
| Bukovynska Nadia | (Ukraine) Valeriy Sarafinchan | |
| Nika Mykolaiv | (Ukraine) Volodymyr Yefimako | |
| Pantery Uman | (Ukraine) Yuriy Dereniuk | |
| EMS Podillia Vinnytsia | (Ukraine) Oleksandr Dudnik | |
| Voskhod Stara Maiachka | (Ukraine) Roman Zayev | |
| Zhytlobud-1 Kharkiv | (Ukraine) Valentyna Kotyk | |
| Zhytlobud-2 Kharkiv | (Ukraine) Natalya Zinchenko | |

== First stage ==
=== League table ===
| Pos | Team | Pld | W | D | L | GF | GA | GD | Pts | Qualification or relegation |
|---|---|---|---|---|---|---|---|---|---|---|
| 1 | Zhytlobud-2 Kharkiv | 9 | 8 | 1 | 0 | 54 | 3 | +51 | 25 | Qualification to Championship round |
| 2 | Zhytlobud-1 Kharkiv | 9 | 8 | 1 | 0 | 46 | 4 | +42 | 25 | Qualification to Championship round |
| 3 | Voskhod Stara Maiachka | 9 | 7 | 0 | 2 | 22 | 9 | +13 | 21 | Qualification to Championship round |
| 4 | Mariupilchanka | 9 | 5 | 0 | 4 | 22 | 27 | −5 | 15 (Note: Head-to-head points: Mariupol 3, Karpaty 0) | Qualification to Championship round |
| 5 | Karpaty Lviv | 9 | 5 | 0 | 4 | 15 | 27 | −12 | 15 | Qualification to Championship round |
| 6 | Ladomyr Volodymyr-Volynskyi | 9 | 3 | 1 | 5 | 15 | 22 | −7 | 10 | Qualification to Championship round |
| 7 | Pantery Uman | 9 | 3 | 0 | 6 | 10 | 27 | −17 | 9 | Qualification to Relegation round |
| 8 | Nika Mykolaiv | 9 | 2 | 0 | 7 | 14 | 32 | −18 | 6 | Qualification to Relegation round |
| 9 | EMS Podillia Vinnytsia | 9 | 1 | 1 | 7 | 5 | 26 | −21 | 4 | Qualification to Relegation round |
| 10 | Bukovynska Nadia | 9 | 1 | 0 | 8 | 7 | 33 | −26 | 3 | Qualification to Relegation round |

Source: womensfootball.com.ua
Rules for classification: 1) Points; 2) Head-to-head points; 3) Head-to-head goal difference; 4) Head-to-head goals scored; 5) Goal difference; 6) Goals scored.

=== Results ===
| Home \ Away | NAD | NIK | LAD | MAR | PAN | POD | KAR | VSM | ZH1 | ZH2 |
|---|---|---|---|---|---|---|---|---|---|---|
| Bukovynska Nadia | | 3–0 | | | | 0–1 | | | 1–4 | 1–6 |
| Nika Mykolaiv | | | 3–6 | 4–2 | 1–2 | 3–0 | 1–2 | 1–3 | | |
| Ladomyr Volodymyr-Volynskyi | 2–1 | | | | 3–1 | | | 0–2 | 0–2 | |
| Mariupilchanka | 8–1 | | 3–1 | | 3–1 | | | 0–2 | 1–8 | |
| Pantery Uman | 3–0 | | | | | 2–1 | | | 0–6 | 0–10 |
| EMS Podillia Vinnytsia | | | 1–1 | 1–2 | | | 1–2 | | 0–5 | |
| Karpaty Lviv | 3–0 | | 4–2 | 1–3 | 1–0 | | | 1–5 | | |
| Voskhod Stara Maiachka | 6–0 | | | | 2–1 | 2–0 | | | 0–5 | |
| Zhytlobud-1 Kharkiv | | 7–0 | | | | | 8–1 | | | 1–1 |
| Zhytlobud-2 Kharkiv | | 7–1 | 5–0 | 8–0 | | 9–0 | 7–0 | 1–0 | | |

Updated to match(es) played on 13 March 2020. Source: WFPL.UA
Legend: Blue = home team win; Yellow = draw; Red = away team win.

== Championship round ==
=== Championship round table ===
| Pos | Team | Pld | W | D | L | GF | GA | GD | Pts | |
|---|---|---|---|---|---|---|---|---|---|---|
| 1 | Zhytlobud-1 Kharkiv (Note: Participant of the 2020–21 Ukrainian Women's Cup final.) (C) | 19 | 18 | 1 | 0 | 99 | 7 | +92 | 55 | Qualification for the Champions League first round |
| 2 | Zhytlobud-2 Kharkiv | 19 | 16 | 1 | 2 | 97 | 11 | +86 | 49 | |
| 3 | Voskhod Stara Maiachka | 19 | 11 | 1 | 7 | 32 | 29 | +3 | 34 | |
| 4 | Ladomyr Volodymyr-Volynskyi | 19 | 8 | 1 | 10 | 34 | 54 | −20 | 25 | |
| 5 | Mariupol | 19 | 6 | 1 | 12 | 27 | 59 | −32 | 19 | |
| 6 | Karpaty Lviv | 19 | 5 | 2 | 12 | 22 | 69 | −47 | 17 | |

Source: womensfootball.com.ua
Rules for classification: 1) Points; 2) Head-to-head points; 3) Head-to-head goal difference; 4) Head-to-head goals scored; 5) Goal difference; 6) Goals scored.
(C) Champions

=== Results ===
| Home \ Away | KAR | LAD | MAR | VSM | ZH1 | ZH2 |
|---|---|---|---|---|---|---|
| Karpaty Lviv | | 2–3 | 0–1 | 1–1 | 0–7 | 1–5 |
| Ladomyr Volodymyr-Volynskyi | 5–2 | | 1–0 | 0–1 | 2–6 | 1–6 |
| Mariupol | 1–1 | 2–5 | | 0–3 | 0–5 | 0–4 |
| Voskhod Stara Maiachka | 1–0 | 1–2 | 2–1 | | 0–4 | 1–5 |
| Zhytlobud-1 Kharkiv | 6–0 | 8–0 | 8–0 | 4–0 | | 4–1 |
| Zhytlobud-2 Kharkiv | 12–0 | 4–0 | 3–0 | 3–0 | 0–1 | |

Source: WFPL.UA
Legend: Blue = home team win; Yellow = draw; Red = away team win.

== Relegation round ==
=== Relegation round table ===
| Pos | Team | Pld | W | D | L | GF | GA | GD | Pts | |
|---|---|---|---|---|---|---|---|---|---|---|
| 7 | Nika Mykolaiv | 15 | 7 | 1 | 7 | 57 | 35 | +22 | 22 | Relegation to Persha Liha |
| 8 | Pantery Uman | 15 | 6 | 0 | 9 | 35 | 39 | −4 | 18 | |
| 9 | EMS Podillia Vinnytsia | 15 | 4 | 2 | 9 | 23 | 31 | −8 | 14 | |
| 10 | Bukovynska Nadia | 15 | 1 | 0 | 14 | 11 | 103 | −92 | 3 | |

Source: womensfootball.com.ua
Rules for classification: 1) Points; 2) Head-to-head points; 3) Head-to-head goal difference; 4) Head-to-head goals scored; 5) Goal difference; 6) Goals scored.

=== Results ===
| Home \ Away | NAD | NIK | PAN | POD |
|---|---|---|---|---|
| Bukovynska Nadia | | 0–20 | 2–12 | 0–9 |
| Nika Mykolaiv | 12–0 | | 4–0 | 3–0 |
| Pantery Uman | 10–2 | 2–3 | | 1–0 |
| EMS Podillia Vinnytsia | 7–0 | 1–1 | 1–0 | |

Source: WFPL.UA
Legend: Blue = home team win; Yellow = draw; Red = away team win.

== Top scorers ==
| Rank | Player | Club | Goals |
|---|---|---|---|
| 1 | (Ukraine) Yana Kalinina | Zhytlobud-2 Kharkiv | 22 |
| 2 | (Ukraine) Hanna Voronina | Zhytlobud-1 Kharkiv | 20 |
| 3 | (Ukraine) Roksolana Kravchuk | Zhytlobud-2 Kharkiv | 18 |

== Persha Liha teams ==
Locations of teams in the 2020–21 Ukrainian Championship First League

=== Team changes ===
| Promoted to Vyshcha Liha | Relegated from Vyshcha Liha |
|---|---|
| Karpaty Lviv; Bukovynska Nadia Velykyi Kuchuriv; Spartak-Orion Mykolaiv | Rodyna Kostopil; Iednist-ShVSM Plysky (reorganized) |
| Entering league competitions | Leaving league competitions |
| SDIuShOR-16 Kyiv; DIuSSh-Iunist Chernihiv; Kobra-DIuSSh Bilokurakyne | Kolos-Mriya Makhnivka (withdrew) |

=== Name changes ===
- During winter break SDIuShOR-16 Kyiv was replaced with OKIP Kyiv.
- Lviv-Iantarochka Novoyavorivsk changed its name to Iantarochka Novoyavorivsk.
- DIuSSh Iunist Chernihiv changed its name to Iunist-ShVSM Chernihiv following disbandment of Iednist-ShVSM Plysky.
- Kobra-DIuSSh Bilokurakyne changed its name to Kobra Bilokurakyne.

== Persha Liha ==
| Pos | Team | Pld | W | D | L | GF | GA | GD | Pts | |
|---|---|---|---|---|---|---|---|---|---|---|
| 1 | Kolos Kovalivka | 16 | 14 | 0 | 2 | 95 | 4 | +91 | 42 (Note: Head-to-head goal difference: Kolos +1, Ateks -1) | Promotion to Vyshcha Liha |
| 2 | Ateks Kyiv | 16 | 14 | 0 | 2 | 58 | 10 | +48 | 42 | Promotion to Vyshcha Liha |
| 3 | KhPKSP-Zhytlobud-2 Kharkiv | 16 | 11 | 2 | 3 | 64 | 21 | +43 | 35 | |
| 4 | Rodyna-Litsei Kostopil | 16 | 10 | 3 | 3 | 44 | 20 | +24 | 33 | |
| 5 | Prykarpattia-DIuSSh-3 Iv.Frankivsk | 16 | 6 | 1 | 9 | 30 | 40 | −10 | 19 | |
| 6 | OKIP Kyiv (Note: SDIuShOR-16 Kyiv was replaced during the 2020–21 winter break with OKIP Kyiv which inherited results of the predecessor.) | 16 | 4 | 0 | 12 | 11 | 45 | −34 | 12 | |
| 7 | Iunist-ShVSM Chernihiv | 16 | 4 | 2 | 10 | 30 | 33 | −3 | 11 (Note: Iunist-ShVSM and Iantarochka both were deducted 3 points for no-show.) | |
| 8 | Iantarochka Novoiavorivsk | 16 | 3 | 2 | 11 | 18 | 55 | −37 | 8 | |
| 9 | Kobra Bilokurakyne | 16 | 1 | 0 | 15 | 2 | 124 | −122 | 3 | |
| - | Luhanochka (Note: Luhanochka was removed from competitions and its record was annulled.) | 0 | 0 | 0 | 3 | 0 | 24 | — | −3 | Withdrew |

Source: womensfootball.com.ua
Rules for classification: 1) Points; 2) Head-to-head points; 3) Head-to-head goal difference; 4) Head-to-head goals scored; 5) Goal difference; 6) Goals scored.

=== Top scorer ===
| Rank | Player | Club | Goals |
|---|---|---|---|
| 1 | (Ukraine) Anna Kaverzina | Kolos Kovalivka | 17 |
