= UEFA Women's Euro 2025 qualifying League B =

Tournament details
- Dates: 5 April – 16 July 2024
- Teams: 16
- Promoted: Portugal; Scotland; Switzerland; Wales
- Relegated: Azerbaijan; Israel; Kosovo; Malta; Slovakia

Tournament statistics
- Matches played: 48
- Goals scored: 129 (2.69 per match)
- Attendance: 89,016 (1,855 per match)
- Top scorer(s): (Scotland) Martha Thomas (Wales) Jess Fishlock (5 goals each)
- Women's Nations League Women's Euro qualifying

League B of UEFA Women's Euro 2025 qualifying was the second division of qualifying for UEFA Women's Euro 2025, the international football competition involving the women's national teams of the member associations of UEFA. The results were also used to determine the leagues for the 2025 UEFA Women's Nations League competition.

== Format ==
League B consisted of 16 UEFA members ranked 17th to 32nd among competition entrants in the 2023–24 UEFA Women's Nations League ranking, split into four groups of four. Each team played six matches within their group, using the home-and-away round-robin format with double matchdays in April, May to June, and July 2024.

After the league phase, the best-ranked League B teams advanced to the play-offs to determine who qualifies for the final tournament.

The group winners, runners-up and third-placed teams in League B (except Switzerland) advanced to the first round (i.e. the twelve best-ranked teams). The six higher-ranked of those teams were seeded and drawn into ties against the six lower-ranked teams. The six winners progress to the next round.

Switzerland are guaranteed a spot in the final tournament as hosts, and therefore will not participate in the play-offs. Since they finished in the top three places in their group, the best-ranked fourth-placed team (i.e. the team ranked 13th in League B) also qualified for the first round.

The competition also acted as the first phase for the 2025 UEFA Women's Nations League, which will use an identical league structure. The winners of each group were promoted to League A, while the fourth-placed team from each group and the worst-ranked third placed team was relegated to League C.

== Seeding ==
Teams were allocated to League B after the conclusion of the 2023–24 Women's Nations League promotion/relegation matches on 28 February 2024. Teams were split into four pots of four teams, ordered based on their overall ranking.

Pot 1
Team	Rank
Portugal	13
Switzerland	14
Scotland	15
Wales	16

Pot 2
Team	Rank
Bosnia and Herzegovina (Note: Belgium, Bosnia and Herzegovina, Croatia, Hungary, Iceland, Norway, Serbia, and Sweden participated in the League A vs League B promotion/relegation matches in February 2024 to determine each team's league allocation.)	21
Serbia	22
Croatia	23
Hungary	24

Pot 3
Team	Rank
Slovakia (Note: Bulgaria, Latvia, Montenegro, Northern Ireland, Slovakia, and Ukraine participated in the League B vs League C promotion/relegation matches in February 2024 to determine each team's league allocation.)	25
Northern Ireland	26
Ukraine	27
Turkey	33

Pot 4
Team	Rank
Malta	34
Israel	35
Kosovo	36
Azerbaijan	37

The draw took place in Nyon, Switzerland on 5 March 2024 at 13:00 CET. Each group contained one team from each pot. The draw started with Pot 1 and ended with Pot 4, with drawn teams assigned to the first available group in ascending order from B1 to B4. For political reasons, Kosovo could not be drawn into the same group as either Bosnia and Herzegovina or Serbia.

== Groups ==
Times are CEST (UTC+2), as listed by UEFA (local times, if different, are in parentheses).

=== Group 1 ===
Pos	Team	Pld	W	D	L	GF	GA	GD	Pts	Qualification	(Switzerland)	(Turkey)	(Hungary)	(Azerbaijan)
1	Switzerland (H, P)	6	5	0	1	14	3	+11	15	Qualify for final tournament as host and promotion to League A	—	3–1	2–1	3–0
2	Turkey	6	3	0	3	8	8	0	9	Advance to play-offs	0–2	—	2–1	1–0
3	Hungary	6	2	1	3	10	9	+1	7	Advance to play-offs	1–0	1–4	—	1–1
4	Azerbaijan (R)	6	1	1	4	2	14	−12	4	Relegation to League C and advance to play-offs (Note: Since Switzerland (who qualified as hosts) finished in the top three places in their group, the best-ranked fourth-placed team qualified for the play-offs.)	0–4	1–0	0–5	—

Source: UEFA
Rules for classification: Tiebreakers
(H) Hosts of final tournament; (P) Promoted; (R) Relegated
Notes:
5 April 2024
17:45

Hungary	1–1	Azerbaijan
Csiszár 44'	Report	Jafarzade 74' (pen.)

Szent Gellért Fórum, Szeged
Attendance: 1,713
Referee: Kirsty Dowle (England)
5 April 2024
19:00

Switzerland	3–1	Turkey
Calligaris 30', 78'; Bühler 52'	Report	Türkoğlu 80'

Letzigrund, Zurich
Attendance: 5,490
Referee: Sandra Braz (Portugal)

9 April 2024
14:00 (16:00 UTC+4)

Azerbaijan	0–4	Switzerland
	Report	Vallotto 11' (pen.); Bühler 20'; Pilgrim 51'; Riesen 54'

Dalga Arena, Baku
Attendance: 213
Referee: Alina Peşu (Romania)
9 April 2024
19:00 (20:00 UTC+3)

Turkey	2–1	Hungary
Türkoğlu 80'; Cin 87'	Report	Csányi 45+1'

Pendik Stadyumu, Istanbul
Attendance: 566
Referee: Katarzyna Lisiecka-Sęk (Poland)

31 May 2024
19:00 (20:00 UTC+3)

Turkey	1–0	Azerbaijan
Topçu 43' (pen.)	Report

Erzincan 13 Şubat Şehir Stadium, Erzincan
Attendance: 10,845
Referee: Alexandra Collin (France)
31 May 2024
20:00

Switzerland	2–1	Hungary
Lehmann 27'; Bachmann 61' (pen.)	Report	Zeller 56'

Tissot Arena, Biel/Bienne
Attendance: 2,905
Referee: Emanuela Rusta (Albania)

4 June 2024
17:00 (19:00 UTC+4)

Azerbaijan	1–0	Turkey
Mirzaliyeva 89'	Report

Dalga Arena, Baku
Attendance: 200
Referee: Nanna Løf Andersen (Denmark)
4 June 2024
17:30

Hungary	1–0	Switzerland
Pápai 73'	Report

Hidegkuti Nándor Stadion, Budapest
Attendance: 1,413
Referee: Eleni Antoniou (Greece)

12 July 2024
18:00 (20:00 UTC+4)

Azerbaijan	0–5	Hungary
	Report	Csiki 21'; Kaján 32'; Pápai 53'; Siklér 90+1', 90+4'

Dalga Arena, Baku
Attendance: 205
Referee: Jelena Pejković (Croatia)
12 July 2024
19:30 (20:30 UTC+3)

Turkey	0–2	Switzerland
	Report	Schertenleib 58'; Crnogorčević 65'

Kocaeli Stadium, İzmit
Attendance: 6,358
Referee: Lina Lehtovaara (Finland)

16 July 2024
19:00

Switzerland	3–0	Azerbaijan
Terchoun 25'; Calligaris 77'; Crnogorčević 88'	Report

Stade Olympique de la Pontaise, Lausanne
Attendance: 2,222
Referee: Miriama Bočková (Slovakia)
16 July 2024
19:00

Hungary	1–4	Turkey
Kaján 66'	Report	Şeker 14'; Keskin 55'; Sadıkoğlu 61'; Hançar 79'

Ménfői úti Stadion, Győr
Attendance: 482
Referee: Franziska Wildfeuer (Germany)

=== Group 2 ===
Pos	Team	Pld	W	D	L	GF	GA	GD	Pts	Qualification	(Scotland)	(Serbia)	(Slovakia)	(Israel)
1	Scotland (P)	6	5	1	0	13	1	+12	16	Advance to play-offs and promotion to League A	—	1–0	1–0	4–1
2	Serbia	6	4	1	1	11	4	+7	13	Advance to play-offs	0–0	—	2–1	1–0
3	Slovakia (R)	6	1	1	4	5	11	−6	4	Advance to play-offs and relegation to League C (Note: The lowest-ranked third-placed team was relegated along with the four last-placed teams.)	0–2	0–4	—	2–0
4	Israel (R)	6	0	1	5	5	18	−13	1	Relegation to League C	0–5	2–4	2–2	—

Source: UEFA
Rules for classification: Tiebreakers
(P) Promoted; (R) Relegated
Notes:
5 April 2024
15:00

Slovakia	2–0	Israel
Hmírová 35'; Mikolajová 39'	Report

NTC Senec, Senec
Attendance: 273
Referee: Silvia Domingos (Portugal)
5 April 2024
18:00

Serbia	0–0	Scotland
	Report

Dubočica Stadium, Leskovac
Attendance: 2,500
Referee: Riem Hussein (Germany)

9 April 2024
16:00

Israel	2–4	Serbia
Kats 31'; Avital 78'	Report	Damnjanović 5', 55'; Filipović 37'; Ćirić 90+2'

Ménfői úti Stadion, Győr (Hungary) (Note: Due to the Gaza war, Israel were required to play their home matches at neutral venues.)
Attendance: 0 (behind closed doors)
Referee: Réka Molnar (Hungary)
9 April 2024
20:35 (19:35 UTC+1)

Scotland	1–0	Slovakia
Howard 62'	Report

Hampden Park, Glasgow
Attendance: 3,127
Referee: Jelena Pejković (Croatia)

31 May 2024
18:00

Serbia	2–1	Slovakia
Slović 22'; Ivanović 53'	Report	Šurnovská 9'

Čukarički Stadium, Belgrade
Attendance: 250
Referee: Elvira Nurmustafina (Kazakhstan)
31 May 2024
20:05 (19:05 UTC+1)

Scotland	4–1	Israel
Emslie 17', 36'; Hanson 30'; Thomas 63' (pen.)	Report	Sommer 84'

Hampden Park, Glasgow
Attendance: 33 (behind closed doors) (Note: Due to the Gaza war protests, Scotland played both their matches against Israel behind closed doors.)
Referee: Deborah Bianchi (Italy)

4 June 2024
16:00

Israel	0–5	Scotland
	Report	Thomas 14', 37', 74', 77'; Cornet 86'

Budaörsi Városi Stadium, Budaörs (Hungary)
Attendance: 0 (behind closed doors)
Referee: Jelena Kumer (Croatia)
4 June 2024
18:00

Slovakia	0–4	Serbia
	Report	Damnjanović 35'; Vlajnic 55'; Ivanović 87'; Matejić 90+4'

Anton Malatinský Stadium, Trnava
Attendance: 406
Referee: Monika Mularczyk (Poland)

12 July 2024
19:00

Slovakia	0–2	Scotland
	Report	Emslie 46', 70'

Štadión pod Zoborom, Nitra
Attendance: 675
Referee: Merima Čelik (Bosnia and Herzegovina)
12 July 2024
20:00

Serbia	1–0	Israel
Filipović 7'	Report

Serbian FA Sports Center, Stara Pazova
Referee: Alexandra Collin (France)

16 July 2024
19:00 (18:00 UTC+1)

Scotland	1–0	Serbia
Hanson 39'	Report

Firhill Stadium, Glasgow
Attendance: 3,068
Referee: Hristiyana Guteva (Bulgaria)
16 July 2024
19:00

Israel	2–2	Slovakia
Selimhodzic 37'; Elinav 45+3'	Report	Košíková 14'; Bogorová 89'

Budaörsi Városi Stadium, Budaörs (Hungary)
Attendance: 20
Referee: Gamze Durmuş (Turkey)

=== Group 3 ===
Pos	Team	Pld	W	D	L	GF	GA	GD	Pts	Qualification	(Portugal)	(Northern Ireland)	(Bosnia and Herzegovina)	(Malta)
1	Portugal (P)	6	5	1	0	14	2	+12	16	Advance to play-offs and promotion to League A	—	4–0	3–0	3–1
2	Northern Ireland	6	3	1	2	8	7	+1	10	Advance to play-offs	1–2	—	2–0	0–0
3	Bosnia and Herzegovina	6	2	1	3	4	9	−5	7	Advance to play-offs	0–0	1–3	—	2–1
4	Malta (R)	6	0	1	5	2	10	−8	1	Relegation to League C	0–2	0–2	0–1	—

Source: UEFA
Rules for classification: Tiebreakers
(P) Promoted; (R) Relegated
5 April 2024
20:00 (19:00 UTC+1)

Northern Ireland	0–0	Malta
	Report

Windsor Park, Belfast
Attendance: 1,602
Referee: Maria Marotta (Italy)
5 April 2024
21:45 (20:45 UTC+1)

Portugal	3–0	Bosnia and Herzegovina
C. Costa 28'; Slišković 45+4' (o.g.); Di. Silva 62'	Report

Estádio Dr. Magalhães Pessoa, Leiria
Attendance: 6,097
Referee: Eleni Antoniou (Greece)

9 April 2024
15:30

Bosnia and Herzegovina	1–3	Northern Ireland
Milinković 56'	Report	Wade 54'; Bell 60'; Magill 68'

Bosnia and Herzegovina FA Training Centre, Zenica
Attendance: 480
Referee: Désirée Grundbacher (Switzerland)
9 April 2024
18:30

Malta	0–2	Portugal
	Report	C. Costa 48' (pen.); Capeta 78'

Centenary Stadium, Ta' Qali
Attendance: 1,026
Referee: Katalin Sipos (Hungary)

31 May 2024
19:30

Malta	0–1	Bosnia and Herzegovina
	Report	Nikolić 88'

Centenary Stadium, Ta' Qali
Attendance: 661
Referee: Emily Heaslip (England)
31 May 2024
21:45 (20:45 UTC+1)

Portugal	4–0	Northern Ireland
C. Costa 25' (pen.); Alves 49', 90+6'; Amado 83'	Report

Estádio Dr. Magalhães Pessoa, Leiria
Attendance: 10,017
Referee: Tess Olofsson (Sweden)

4 June 2024
16:00

Bosnia and Herzegovina	2–1	Malta
Nikolić 64', 90+4'	Report	Farrugia 10'

Bosnia and Herzegovina FA Training Centre, Zenica
Attendance: 120
Referee: Sofik Torosyan (Armenia)
4 June 2024
20:00 (19:00 UTC+1)

Northern Ireland	1–2	Portugal
Wade 5'	Report	Nazareth 18'; Norton 30'

Mourneview Park, Lurgan
Attendance: 1,711
Referee: Franziska Wildfeuer (Germany)

12 July 2024
19:00

Bosnia and Herzegovina	0–0	Portugal
	Report

Bilino Polje Stadium, Zenica
Attendance: 301
Referee: Jana Adámková (Czech Republic)
12 July 2024
19:30

Malta	0–2	Northern Ireland
	Report	Lipman 10' (o.g.); Beattie 80'

Centenary Stadium, Ta' Qali
Attendance: 652
Referee: Cansu Tiryaki (Turkey)

16 July 2024
19:00 (18:00 UTC+1)

Portugal	3–1	Malta
Capeta 7'; Ribeiro 28'; J. Silva 86'	Report	Farrugia 16'

Estádio Dr. Magalhães Pessoa, Leiria
Attendance: 6,231
Referee: Jelena Međedović (Serbia)
16 July 2024
19:00 (18:00 UTC+1)

Northern Ireland	2–0	Bosnia and Herzegovina
Andrews 47'; Wade 67'	Report

Windsor Park, Belfast
Attendance: 2,260
Referee: Monika Mularczyk (Poland)

=== Group 4 ===
Pos	Team	Pld	W	D	L	GF	GA	GD	Pts	Qualification	(Wales)	(Ukraine)	(Croatia)	(Kosovo)
1	Wales (P)	6	4	2	0	18	3	+15	14	Advance to play-offs and promotion to League A	—	1–1	4–0	2–0
2	Ukraine	6	3	2	1	11	4	+7	11	Advance to play-offs	2–2	—	2–0	2–0
3	Croatia	6	3	0	3	4	9	−5	9	Advance to play-offs	0–3	1–0	—	2–0
4	Kosovo (R)	6	0	0	6	0	17	−17	0	Relegation to League C	0–6	0–4	0–1	—

Source: UEFA
Rules for classification: Tiebreakers
(P) Promoted; (R) Relegated
5 April 2024
17:00 (18:00 UTC+3)

Ukraine	2–0	Kosovo
Petryk 28' (pen.); Khimich 34'	Report

Mardan Sports Complex, Antalya (Turkey) (Note: Due to the Russian invasion of Ukraine, Ukraine were required to play their home matches at neutral venues.)
Attendance: 45
Referee: Karoline Wacker (Germany)
5 April 2024
20:15 (19:15 UTC+1)

Wales	4–0	Croatia
Fishlock 4', 50'; Rowe 51'; James 56'	Report

Racecourse Ground, Wrexham
Attendance: 4,117
Referee: Zuzana Valentová (Slovakia)

9 April 2024
14:00

Kosovo	0–6	Wales
	Report	Rowe 30', 60'; Barton 44'; Morgan 62'; Hughes 85', 90+3'

Zahir Pajaziti Stadium, Podujevo
Attendance: 200
Referee: Galiya Echeva (Bulgaria)
9 April 2024
16:00

Croatia	1–0	Ukraine
Lojna 18'	Report

Ivan Laljak-Ivić Stadium, Zaprešić
Attendance: 517
Referee: Zulema González (Spain)

31 May 2024
17:00

Kosovo	0–1	Croatia
	Report	Rudelić 58'

Zahir Pajaziti Stadium, Podujevo
Attendance: 500
Referee: Kristina Georgieva (Bulgaria)
31 May 2024
20:15 (19:15 UTC+1)

Wales	1–1	Ukraine
Barton 64' (pen.)	Report	Andrukhiv 3'

Parc y Scarlets, Llanelli
Attendance: 4,046
Referee: Shona Shukrula (Netherlands)

4 June 2024
20:00

Ukraine	2–2	Wales
Kalinina 34'; Kozlova 90+8'	Report	Barton 74' (pen.); Fishlock 77'

Stadion Dyskobolii, Grodzisk Wielkopolski (Poland)
Attendance: 88
Referee: Caroline Lanssens (Belgium)
4 June 2024
20:00

Croatia	2–0	Kosovo
Rudelić 15'; Marković 74'	Report

Stadion Branko Čavlović-Čavlek, Karlovac
Attendance: 348
Referee: Michaela Pachtová (Czech Republic)

12 July 2024
18:00

Kosovo	0–4	Ukraine
	Report	Apanashchenko 3'; Khimich 8'; Basanska 21'; Kravchuk 27'

Fadil Vokrri Stadium, Pristina
Attendance: 347
Referee: Zuzana Valentová (Slovakia)
12 July 2024
20:15

Croatia	0–3	Wales
	Report	Fishlock 14'; Ingle 66'; Barton 89' (pen.)

Stadion Branko Čavlović-Čavlek, Karlovac
Attendance: 457
Referee: Marta Huerta de Aza (Spain)

16 July 2024
19:00 (18:00 UTC+1)

Wales	2–0	Kosovo
Fishlock 8'; McAteer 27'	Report

Parc y Scarlets, Llanelli
Attendance: 4,199
Referee: Deborah Anex (Switzerland)
16 July 2024
19:00

Ukraine	2–0	Croatia
Korsun 31'; Kravchuk 35'	Report

Petar Miloševski Training Centre, Skopje (North Macedonia)
Attendance: 30
Referee: Louise Thompson (Northern Ireland)

== Qualification for play-offs ==
The winners, runners-up, and third-placed teams in each group advanced to the play-offs (excluding Switzerland who qualified automatically as hosts). Since Switzerland finished in the top three places in their group, the best-ranked fourth-placed team also advanced to the play-offs.

This means that the twelve best-ranked League B teams excluding Switzerland advanced to the first round. The six higher-ranked teams were seeded, and drawn against the six lower-ranked teams. The winner of those ties will advance to the second round.

Rnk	Grp	Team	Pld	W	D	L	GF	GA	GD	Pts	Qualification
17	B3	Portugal	6	5	1	0	14	2	+12	16	Advance to play-offs (seeded)
18	B2	Scotland	6	5	1	0	13	1	+12	16	Advance to play-offs (seeded)
19	B1	Switzerland (H)	6	5	0	1	14	3	+11	15	Qualify for final tournament as host
20	B4	Wales	6	4	2	0	18	3	+15	14	Advance to play-offs (seeded)
21	B2	Serbia	6	4	1	1	11	4	+7	13	Advance to play-offs (seeded)
22	B4	Ukraine	6	3	2	1	11	4	+7	11	Advance to play-offs (seeded)
23	B3	Northern Ireland	6	3	1	2	8	7	+1	10	Advance to play-offs (seeded)
24	B1	Turkey	6	3	0	3	8	8	0	9	Advance to play-offs (unseeded)
25	B4	Croatia	6	3	0	3	4	9	−5	9	Advance to play-offs (unseeded)
26	B1	Hungary	6	2	1	3	10	9	+1	7	Advance to play-offs (unseeded)
27	B3	Bosnia and Herzegovina	6	2	1	3	4	9	−5	7	Advance to play-offs (unseeded)
28	B2	Slovakia	6	1	1	4	5	11	−6	4	Advance to play-offs (unseeded)
29	B1	Azerbaijan	6	1	1	4	2	14	−12	4	Advance to play-offs (unseeded)
30	B3	Malta	6	0	1	5	2	10	−8	1	
31	B2	Israel	6	0	1	5	5	18	−13	1	
32	B4	Kosovo	6	0	0	6	0	17	−17	0	

Source: UEFA
Rules for classification: Ranking criteria
(H) Hosts of final tournament

== Ranking of third-placed teams ==
The lowest-ranked third-placed team was relegated to League C for the 2025 Women's Nations League, along with the four last-placed teams.

Rnk	Grp	Team	Pld	W	D	L	GF	GA	GD	Pts	Promotion or relegation
25	B4	Croatia	6	3	0	3	4	9	−5	9	
26	B1	Hungary	6	2	1	3	10	9	+1	7	
27	B3	Bosnia and Herzegovina	6	2	1	3	4	9	−5	7	
28	B2	Slovakia	6	1	1	4	5	11	−6	4	Relegation to League C

Source: UEFA
Rules for classification: Ranking criteria

== League ranking ==
The 16 League B teams were ranked 17th to 32nd overall in the UEFA Women's Euro 2025 qualifying according to their league ranking.

The four group winners were promoted to League A for the upcoming 2025 UEFA Women's Nations League. The four last-placed teams in each group, along with the worst-ranked third-placed team, were relegated to League C.

Rnk	Grp	Team	Pld	W	D	L	GF	GA	GD	Pts	Promotion or relegation
17	B3	Portugal	6	5	1	0	14	2	+12	16	Promotion to League A
18	B2	Scotland	6	5	1	0	13	1	+12	16	Promotion to League A
19	B1	Switzerland	6	5	0	1	14	3	+11	15	Promotion to League A
20	B4	Wales	6	4	2	0	18	3	+15	14	Promotion to League A
21	B2	Serbia	6	4	1	1	11	4	+7	13	
22	B4	Ukraine	6	3	2	1	11	4	+7	11	
23	B3	Northern Ireland	6	3	1	2	8	7	+1	10	
24	B1	Turkey	6	3	0	3	8	8	0	9	
25	B4	Croatia	6	3	0	3	4	9	−5	9	
26	B1	Hungary	6	2	1	3	10	9	+1	7	
27	B3	Bosnia and Herzegovina	6	2	1	3	4	9	−5	7	
28	B2	Slovakia	6	1	1	4	5	11	−6	4	Relegation to League C
29	B1	Azerbaijan	6	1	1	4	2	14	−12	4	Relegation to League C
30	B3	Malta	6	0	1	5	2	10	−8	1	Relegation to League C
31	B2	Israel	6	0	1	5	5	18	−13	1	Relegation to League C
32	B4	Kosovo	6	0	0	6	0	17	−17	0	Relegation to League C

Source: UEFA
Rules for classification: Ranking criteria

== Top goalscorers ==
There were 129 goals scored in 48 matches, for an average of 2.69 goals per match.

5 goals

- (Scotland) Martha Thomas
- (Wales) Jess Fishlock

4 goals

- (Scotland) Claire Emslie
- (Wales) Kayleigh Barton

3 goals

- (Bosnia and Herzegovina) Milena Nikolić
- (Northern Ireland) Lauren Wade
- (Portugal) Carole Costa
- (Serbia) Jovana Damnjanović
- (Switzerland) Viola Calligaris
- (Wales) Rachel Rowe

2 goals

- (Croatia) Ivana Rudelić
- (Hungary) Zsanett Kaján
- (Hungary) Emőke Pápai
- (Hungary) Kinga Siklér
- (Malta) Maria Farrugia
- (Portugal) Lúcia Alves
- (Portugal) Ana Capeta
- (Scotland) Kirsty Hanson
- (Serbia) Tijana Filipović
- (Serbia) Miljana Ivanović
- (Switzerland) Luana Bühler
- (Switzerland) Ana-Maria Crnogorčević
- (Turkey) Ece Türkoğlu
- (Ukraine) Tamila Khimich
- (Ukraine) Roksolana Kravchuk
- (Wales) Elise Hughes

1 goal

- (Azerbaijan) Sevinj Jafarzade
- (Azerbaijan) Nigar Mirzaliyeva
- (Bosnia and Herzegovina) Marija Milinković
- (Croatia) Izabela Lojna
- (Croatia) Ana Maria Marković
- (Hungary) Anna Csiki
- (Hungary) Henrietta Csiszár
- (Hungary) Diána Csányi
- (Hungary) Dóra Zeller
- (Israel) Eden Avital
- (Israel) Shira Elinav
- (Israel) Vital Kats
- (Israel) Noa Selimhodzic
- (Israel) Talia Sommer
- (Northern Ireland) Joely Andrews
- (Northern Ireland) Kerry Beattie
- (Northern Ireland) Megan Bell
- (Northern Ireland) Simone Magill
- (Portugal) Catarina Amado
- (Portugal) Francisca Nazareth
- (Portugal) Andreia Norton
- (Portugal) Stephanie Ribeiro
- (Portugal) Jéssica Silva
- (Portugal) Diana Silva
- (Scotland) Chelsea Cornet
- (Scotland) Sophie Howard
- (Serbia) Nina Matejić
- (Serbia) Violeta Slović
- (Serbia) Tyla-Jay Vlajnic
- (Serbia) Anastasija Ćirić
- (Slovakia) Andrea Bogorová
- (Slovakia) Patrícia Hmírová
- (Slovakia) Kristína Košíková
- (Slovakia) Mária Mikolajová
- (Slovakia) Martina Šurnovská
- (Switzerland) Ramona Bachmann
- (Switzerland) Alisha Lehmann
- (Switzerland) Alayah Pilgrim
- (Switzerland) Nadine Riesen
- (Switzerland) Sydney Schertenleib
- (Switzerland) Meriame Terchoun
- (Switzerland) Smilla Vallotto
- (Turkey) Miray Cin
- (Turkey) Kader Hançar
- (Turkey) Elif Keskin
- (Turkey) Birgül Sadıkoğlu
- (Turkey) Ebru Topçu
- (Turkey) Busem Şeker
- (Ukraine) Veronika Andrukhiv
- (Ukraine) Daryna Apanashchenko
- (Ukraine) Olha Basanska
- (Ukraine) Yana Kalinina
- (Ukraine) Kateryna Korsun
- (Ukraine) Nicole Kozlova
- (Ukraine) Anna Petryk
- (Wales) Sophie Ingle
- (Wales) Angharad James
- (Wales) Mary McAteer
- (Wales) Ffion Morgan

1 own goal

- (Bosnia and Herzegovina) Gloria Slišković (against Portugal)
- (Malta) Emma Lipman (against Northern Ireland)

Source: UEFA
