= Nataliya Sukhorukova =

Ukrainian footballer (born 1975)

Personal information
- Full name: Nataliya Sukhorukova
- Date of birth: 18 October 1975 (age 51)
- Place of birth: Soviet Union
- Position: Midfielder

Senior career*
Years	Team	Apps	(Gls)
- Lehenda Chernihiv
- Metalist Kharkiv
- Zhytlobud-1 Kharkiv

International career
1994–2010	Ukraine		
- * Club domestic league appearances and goals

Nataliya Sukhorukova is a Ukrainian former football midfielder who played for Lehenda Chernihiv, Metalist Kharkiv and Zhytlobud-1 Kharkiv in the Ukrainian League and the European Cup. She was a member of the Ukrainian national team for sixteen years, taking part in the 2009 European Championship, where she was the most experienced player in the squad after Olena Mazurenko.
