= 2020–21 Ukrainian Women's Cup =

Tournament details
- Country: Ukraine
- Dates: 21 April 2021 – 5 June 2021
- Teams: 8

Final positions
- Champions: Zhytlobud-2 Kharkiv
- Runners-up: Zhytlobud-1 Kharkiv

The 2020–21 Ukrainian Women's Cup was the 28th season of Ukrainian knockout competitions among women teams. The competition started late due to scheduling of the previous season's competition.

== Bracket ==
Quarterfinals
Mariupol	4
Nika Mykolaiv	0
Kolos Kovalivka	1
Zhytlobud-1 Kharkiv	7
Voskhod Stara Mayachka	0
Zhytlobud-2 Kharkiv	1
Ladomyr Volodymyr	1
Karpaty Lviv	0

Semifinals
Zhytlobud-1 Kharkiv	4
Mariupol	1
Zhytlobud-2 Kharkiv	2
Ladomyr Volodymyr	0

Final
Zhytlobud-2 Kharkiv	1
Zhytlobud-1 Kharkiv	0

== Competition schedule ==
=== Quarterfinals ===
21 April 2021	Voskhod Stara Mayachka (I)	0–1	(I) Zhytlobud-2 Kharkiv	Oleshky, Kherson Oblast
15:00		Report	Yana Malakhova 5'	Stadium: Start; Attendance: 100; Referee: Lyudmyla Telbukh

21 April 2021	Ladomyr Volodymyr (I)	1–0	(I) Karpaty Lviv	Volodymyr, Volyn Oblast
15:00	Lesia Olkhova 73'	Report		Stadium: Olimp; Attendance: 100; Referee: Kateryna Usova

21 April 2021	Mariupol (I)	4–0	(I) Nika Mykolaiv	Mariupol, Donetsk Oblast
12:00	Maria Barchan 2', 69'; Maryna Pohribnyak 34'; Lidia Lashko 60'	Report		Stadium: Zakhidnyi; Attendance: 60; Referee: Kateryna Zora

21 April 2021	Kolos Kovalivka (II)	1–7	(I) Zhytlobud-1 Kharkiv	Sofiivska Borshchahivka, Kyiv Oblast
12:00	Svitlana Tkachenko 69' (o.g.); Anastasia Druzhchenko 71'	Report	Olha Boychenko 15', 53'; Lyubov Shmatko 40'; Yulia Shevchuk 45'; Olha Ovdiychuk 47'; Anna Petryk 59'	Stadium: Kolos training center Attendance: 0 Referee: Sofia Prychyna

=== Semifinals ===
19 May 2021	Zhytlobud-1 Kharkiv (I)	4–1	(I) Mariupol	Lyubotyn, Kharkiv Oblast
12:00	Iryna Kochnieva 3'; Nadia Khavanska 7'; Olha Ovdiychuk 17'; Hanna Voronina 22' (pen.)	Report	87' (pen.) Lidia Lashko	Stadium: Olimpiyets; Attendance: 70; Referee: Lyudmyla Telbukh

19 May 2021	Zhytlobud-2 Kharkiv (I)	2–0	(I) Ladomyr Volodymyr	Kharkiv
11:00	20', 55' Yana Malakhova	Report		Stadium: Nova Bavaria; Attendance: 50; Referee: Inna Vakulko

=== Final ===
5 June 2021	Zhytlobud-1 Kharkiv (I)	0–1	(I) Zhytlobud-2 Kharkiv	Kyiv
17:00		Report	38' Yana Kalinina	Stadium: im. Bannikova; Attendance: 350; Referee: Kateryna Monzul

== See also ==
- 2020–21 Vyshcha Liha (women)
- 2020–21 Ukrainian Cup
