= Maryna Masalska =

Ukrainian footballer (born 1985)

Personal information
- Date of birth: 17 May 1985 (age 41)
- Height: 5 ft 7 in (1.70 m)
- Position: Defender

Team information
- Current team: Metalist 1925 Kharkiv

Senior career*
Years	Team	Apps	(Gls)
2005—2014	Zhytlobud-1 Kharkiv	94	(14)

International career
2005—2014	Ukraine	15	(0)

Managerial career
- Metalist 1925 Kharkiv (assistant)
- * Club domestic league appearances and goals

Maryna Masalska (Ukrainian: Марина Масальська) is a former Ukrainian football defender who played for Zhilstroy Kharkiv in the Ukrainian League and the European Cup. She was a member of the Ukrainian national team, taking part in the 2009 European Championship.

After retirement she became a coach at Metalist 1925 Kharkiv.

== Honours ==
- Ukrainian Women's League: 2012, 2013, 2014
- Ukrainian Women's Cup: 2012, 2013
