= Tetyana Kitayeva =

Ukrainian footballer

Tetyana Kitayeva Тетяна Китаєва (Ukrainian)
Personal information
- Full name: Tetyana Igorivna Kitayeva
- Date of birth: 28 October 1995 (age 31)
- Position: Midfielder

Team information
- Current team: AEM
- Number: 8

Senior career*
Years	Team	Apps	(Gls)
- Zhytlobud-2
2022–	AEM	8	(1)

International career^{‡}
2011	Ukraine U17	3	(0)
2014	Ukraine U19	3	(0)
2019–	Ukraine	6	(0)
- * Club domestic league appearances and goals as of 28 May 2022 ‡ National team caps and goals as of 10 March 2020

Tetyana Igorivna Kitayeva (Ukrainian: Китаєва Тетяна Ігорівна, born 28 October 1995) is a Ukrainian footballer who plays as a midfielder for Spanish Primera Federación club SE AEM and the Ukraine women's national team.

== National team ==
She made her debut in the national team of Ukraine on March 4, 2020, in a 0-3 loss in the Pinatar Cup against Scotland. Tetiana came on the field in the 84th minute, replacing Daryna Apanashchenko.
