= Mazurenko =

Mazurenko is a Ukrainian-language surname. It may refer to:

- Aleksey Mazurenko (1917–2004), Soviet military pilot, twice Hero of the Soviet Union
- Oleh Mazurenko (born 1977), Ukrainian footballer and football manager
- Olena Mazurenko (born 1969), Ukrainian footballer
