= Anastasia Filenko =

Ukrainian footballer

Personal information
- Date of birth: 1 November 1990 (age 36)
- Place of birth: Ukraine,
- Position: Defender

Team information
- Current team: Vorskla Poltava

Senior career*
Years	Team	Apps	(Gls)
	Vorskla Poltava	0	(0)

International career^{‡}
	Ukraine	17	(0)
- * Club domestic league appearances and goals as of 23:30, 23 November 2022 (UTC) ‡ National team caps and goals as of 19:50, 30 August 2019 (UTC)

Anastasia Filenko (Ukrainian: Анастасія Філенко; born 1 November 1990) is a Ukrainian footballer who plays as a defender and has appeared for the Ukraine women's national team.

== Career ==
Filenko has been capped for the Ukraine national team, appearing for the team during the 2019 FIFA Women's World Cup qualifying cycle.
