= Iya Andrushchak =

Ukrainian footballer (born 1987)

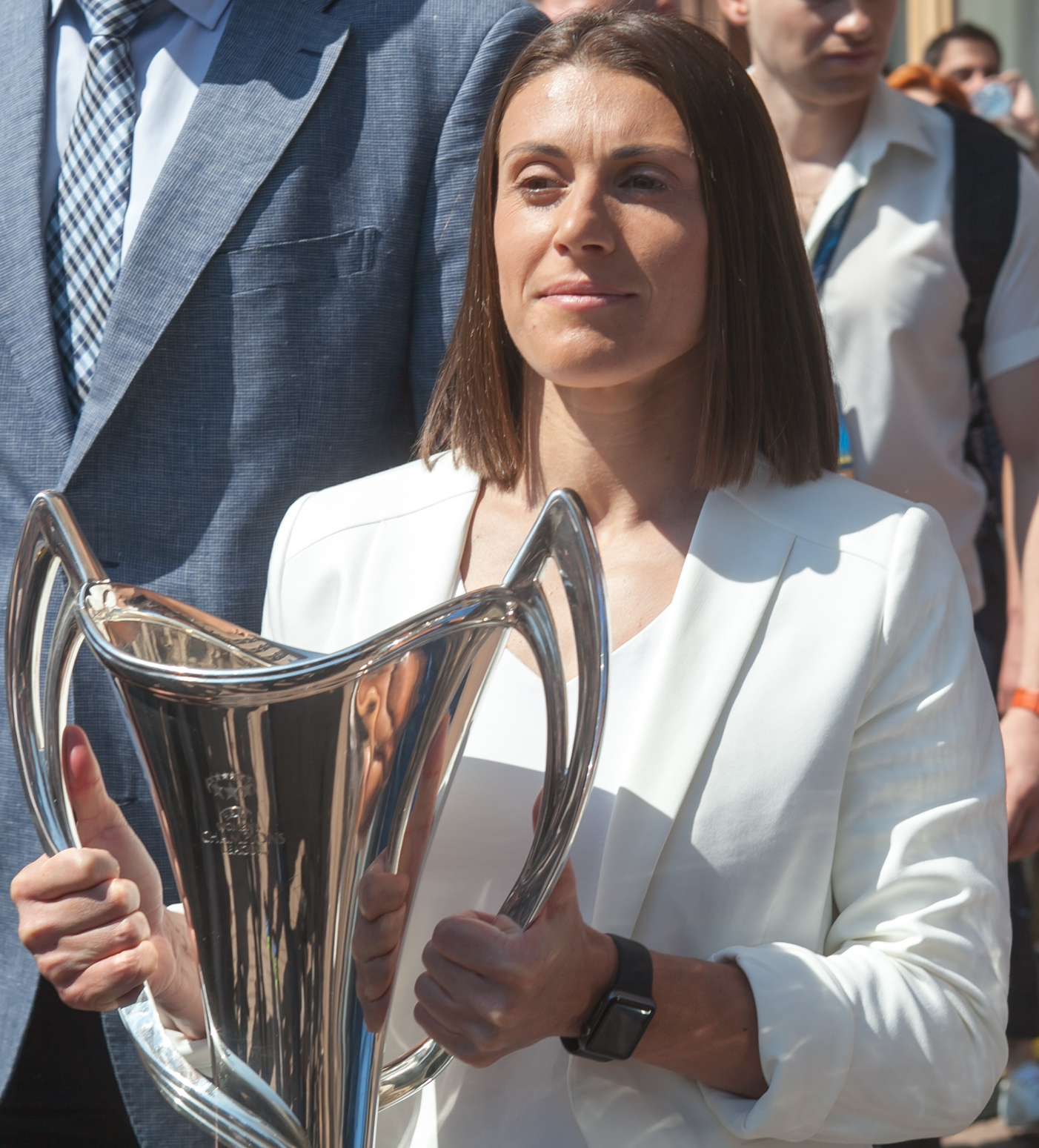

Personal information
- Full name: Iya Rafaelivna Andrushchak
- Birth name: Iya Rafailovna Andrushchak (Russian: Ия Рафаиловна Андрущак)
- Date of birth: 13 March 1987 (age 39)
- Place of birth: Leningrad, Soviet Union (now Russia)
- Position: Midfielder

Team information
- Current team: Ukraine national team

Youth career
- DYuSSh-1 Khmelnytskyi

Senior career*
Years	Team	Apps	(Gls)
2003–2006	Lehenda Chernihiv	35	(15)
2007–2011	Zhytlobud-1 Kharkiv	51	(14)
2012–2013	FK Kubanochka	13	(1)
2013–2016	Zvezda 2005 Perm	61	(3)
2017–2018	Zhytlobud-1	24	(0)
2019–2023	Zhytlobud-2/Vorskla	41	(7)

International career
2003–????	Ukraine U-19	10	(0)
2010–2021	Ukraine	58	(2)

Managerial career
- 2023–2024: Vorskla Poltava (youth team)
- 2024–2025: Vorskla-2 Poltava
- 2025–2026: Vorskla Poltava (women team)
- 2026–: Ukraine (women team)
- * Club domestic league appearances and goals

Iya Rafaelivna Andrushchak (Ukrainian: Ія Рафаелівна Андрущак, born 13 March 1987) is a Ukrainian former international footballer who played as a midfielder. Since 2026, she has been the head coach of the Ukraine women's national team.

== Brief biography ==
Andrushchak was born in Leningrad when her mother was a student. After graduation, the family moved back to Khmelnytskyi. In 2000, when she was 14, Andrushchak joined a football section of the local sports school, where she began her football career. Her first coach at the Khmelnytskyi DYuSSh (sports school) was Olena Mykhailo. Before joining the football section, Andrushchak was an athlete of track and field at the Khmelnytskyi DYuSSh. As a teenager, she dreamed of becoming the President of Ukraine. One of her early football moments that inspired her was the 1998–99 UEFA Champions League, when Dynamo Kyiv reached the semifinals.

Already at 15, Andrushchak signed her contract with one of the leaders of the Ukrainian women's football, Lehenda Chernihiv. At Lehenda, her first salary was 200 hryvnia. At the professional level, Andrushchak made her debut at age of 16 during the 2003 Ukrainian Cup competition when Lehenda on the road beat Oleksandriya Kyiv 12–0. During the match, she scored 2 goals.

She made her debut at the club's continental competition during the 2006–07 UEFA Women's Cup, when on 8 August 2006 Lehenda was hosting Cypriot AEK and beating them 4–0.

From 2012 to 2016, Andrushchak played in the Russian Federation. On 13 February 2012, along with Odesa-native Darya Vorontsova, she was introduced as a player of FC Kubanochka from Krasnodar. In 2017, she returned to Zhytlobud-1, where she had played from 2007 to 2011.

Since 2003, Andrushchak has represented Ukraine internationally, at first playing for the under-19 team. She made her debut during the 2003 UEFA Women's Under-19 Championship, the second round of qualification, when on 15 April 2003 at a neutral field, Ukraine beat Slovakia 1–0. Both teams failed to qualify for the finals, nonetheless. From 2010 to 2021, Andrushchak played for the senior team. She recorded 58 appearances for the Ukraine national team and scored 2 goals.

On 8 November 2023, Andrushchak was appointed a senior coach of the Vorskla under-19 team. She became the first female coach to manage a men's team in professional competitions when next season, Vorskla changed its under-19 team into Vorskla-2, competing in the PFL League 2 (tier 3).

== Honours ==
Lehenda Chernihiv

- Ukrainian Women League
  - Winner (1): 2005
  - Runner-up (2): 2004, 2006
- Ukrainian Women Cup
  - Winner (2): 2004, 2005
  - Finalist (2): 2003, 2006

Zhytlobud-1 Kharkiv

- Ukrainian Women League
  - Winner (2): 2008, 2018
  - Runner-up (4): 2007, 2009, 2010, 2017
- Ukrainian Women Cup
  - Winner (5): 2007, 2008, 2010, 2011, 2018
  - Finalist (1): 2009

Zvezda Perm Winner

- Russian Women's Football Championship: 2014
- Russian Women's Cup: 2015

Runner-up

- Russian Women's Football Championship: 2013

Zhytlobud-2 / Vorskla

- Ukrainian Women League
  - Winner (2): 2020, 2023
  - Runner-up (1): 2019
- Ukrainian Women Cup
  - Winner (3): 2020, 2021, 2022
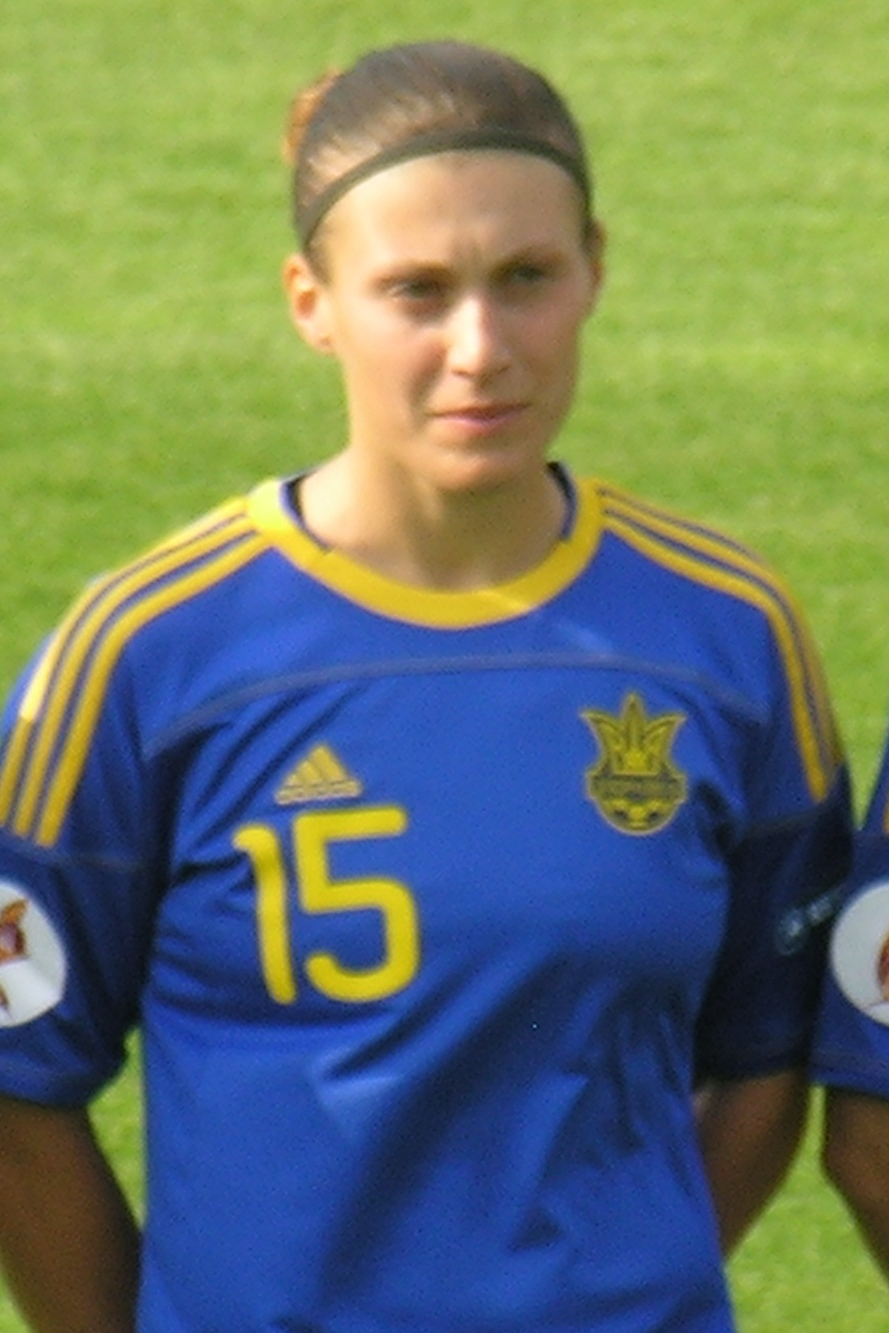
2012
