= Lyubov Shmatko =

Ukrainian footballer (born 1993)

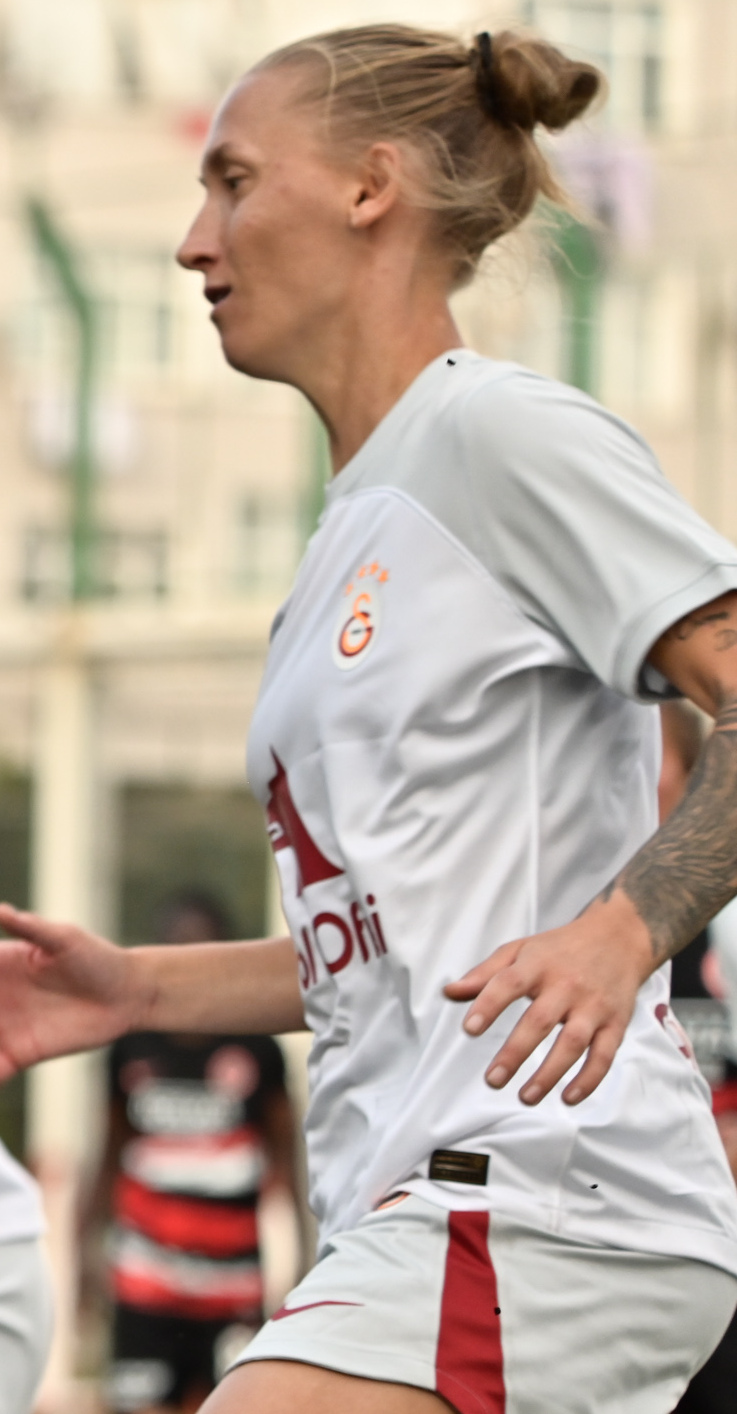
- Galatasaray, 2023

Personal information
- Date of birth: 25 October 1993 (age 33)
- Place of birth: Kalynivka, Mykolaiv Oblast, Ukraine
- Position: Defender

Team information
- Current team: Fomget GSK

Senior career*
| Years | Team | Apps | (Gls) |
| 2017–2020 | FC Minsk | 74 | (27) |
| 2021 | Zhytlobud-1 | 0 | (0) |
| 2022–2023 | Fomget GSK | 13 | (3) |
| 2023–2024 | Galatasaray | 27 | (2) |
| 2024– | Fomget GSK | 22 | (1) |

International career^{‡}
| 2019– | Ukraine | 13 | (1) |
- * Club domestic league appearances and goals as of 15 October 2025 ‡ National team caps and goals as of 28 February 2020 (UTC)

Lyubov Shmatko (Ukrainian: Любов Шматко; born 25 October 1993) is a Ukrainian professional footballer who plays as a defender for Turkish Women's Super League club Fomget GSK and the Ukraine national team.

== Club career ==
=== Fomget Gençlik ve Spor ===
In the beginning of March 2022, Shmatko moved to Turkey and joined the Ankara-based club Fomget Gençlik ve Spor to play in the second half of the 2021-22 Turkish Women's Football Super League.

=== Galatasaray ===
She signed a one-year contract with Galatasaray on 4 August 2023.

== International career ==
Shmatko has been capped for the Ukraine national team, appearing for the team during the 2019 FIFA Women's World Cup qualifying cycle.

== International goals ==
| No. | Date | Venue | Opponent | Score | Result | Competition |
|---|---|---|---|---|---|---|
| 1. | 8 October 2019 | Tallaght Stadium, Dublin, Ireland | Republic of Ireland | 1–2 | 2–3 | UEFA Women's Euro 2022 qualifying |
| 2. | 2 September 2022 | Tórsvøllur, Tórshavn, Faroe Islands | Faroe Islands | 3–0 | 3–0 | 2023 FIFA Women's World Cup qualification |
| 3. | 26 September 2023 | Gdynia Stadium, Gdynia, Poland | Poland | 1–2 | 1–2 | 2023–24 UEFA Women's Nations League |
| 4. | 27 February 2024 | Mardan Sports Complex, Antalya, Turkey | Bulgaria | 3–0 | 3–0 | 2023–24 UEFA Women's Nations League play-off matches |
| 5. | 29 October 2024 | Stadionul Zimbru, Chișinău, Moldova | Turkey | 2–0 | 2–0 | UEFA Women's Euro 2025 qualifying play-offs |
| 6. | 3 December 2024 | Den Dreef, Leuven, Belgium | Belgium | 1–1 | 1–2 | UEFA Women's Euro 2025 qualifying play-offs |
| 7. | 28 October 2025 | Concordia Stadium, Chiajna, Romania | Romania | 1–0 | 1–1 | Friendly |

== Honours ==
Belarusian Premier League

Minsk
Champions (3): 2017, 2018, 2019

Belarusian Women's Super Cup

Minsk
Winners (2): 2018, 2019

Ukrainian Women's Top League

Zhytlobud-1
Champions (1): 2020–21

Turkish Women's Football Super League

ABB Fomget
Champions (2): 2022–23, 2024–25

Galatasaray
Champions (1): 2023–24
