= Daryna Bondarchuk =

Ukrainian footballer (born 1998)

Daryna Bondarchuk Дарина Бондарчук (Ukrainian)
Personal information
- Full name: Daryna Oleksandrivna Bondarchuk
- Date of birth: 20 May 1998 (age 28)
- Position: Goalkeeper

Team information
- Current team: Metalist 1925 Kharkiv
- Number: 23

Senior career*
Years	Team	Apps	(Gls)
2013	Viktoriya Liubar		
2014	Ateks-SDIuShOR 16 Kyiv		
2015	Ukrayinka Ternopil		
2016–2022	Zhytlobud-2		
2022	DUX Logroño	2	(0)
2022–2024	Vorskla Poltava		
2024–	Metalist 1925 Kharkiv		

International career^{‡}
2015–2017	Ukraine U19	8	(0)
2020–	Ukraine	1	(0)
- * Club domestic league appearances and goals ‡ National team caps and goals as of 10 March 2020

Daryna Oleksandrivna Bondarchuk (Ukrainian: Дарина Олександрівна Бондарчук, born 20 May 1998) is a Ukrainian footballer who plays as a goalkeeper for Metalist 1925 Kharkiv and the Ukraine women's national team.
