= Iryna Podolska =

Ukrainian footballer

Iryna Podolska Ірина Подольська (Ukrainian)
Personal information
- Full name: Iryna Serhiivna Podolska
- Date of birth: 14 March 1995 (age 31)
- Position: Defender

Team information
- Current team: Vorskla Poltava

Senior career*
Years	Team	Apps	(Gls)
	Vorskla Poltava	0	(0)

International career^{‡}
2013–2014	Ukraine U19	5	(0)
2019–	Ukraine	28	(0)
- * Club domestic league appearances and goals ‡ National team caps and goals as of 2 December 2024

Iryna Serhiivna Podolska (Ukrainian: Ірина Сергіївна Подольська, born 14 March 1995) is a Ukrainian footballer who plays as a defender for Women's League club Vorskla Poltava and the Ukraine women's national team.
