= Inessa Tytova =

Ukrainian footballer

Inesa Titova
Personal information
- Full name: Inesa Valeriyivna Titova
- Date of birth: 18 March 1976 (age 50)
- Place of birth: Cherkasy, Soviet Union (now Ukraine)
- Position: Defender

Senior career*
Years	Team	Apps	(Gls)
- Codru
- Zhilstroy-1

International career^{‡}
2000–2009	Ukraine	4+	(0+)
- * Club domestic league appearances and goals ‡ National team caps and goals as of 14 November 2009

Inesa Valeriyivna Titova (Ukrainian: Інесса Тітова; born 18 March 1976) is a Ukrainian former footballer who played as a defender. She has been a member of the Ukraine women's national team.
