= Valentyna Kotyk =

Ukrainian footballer and manager

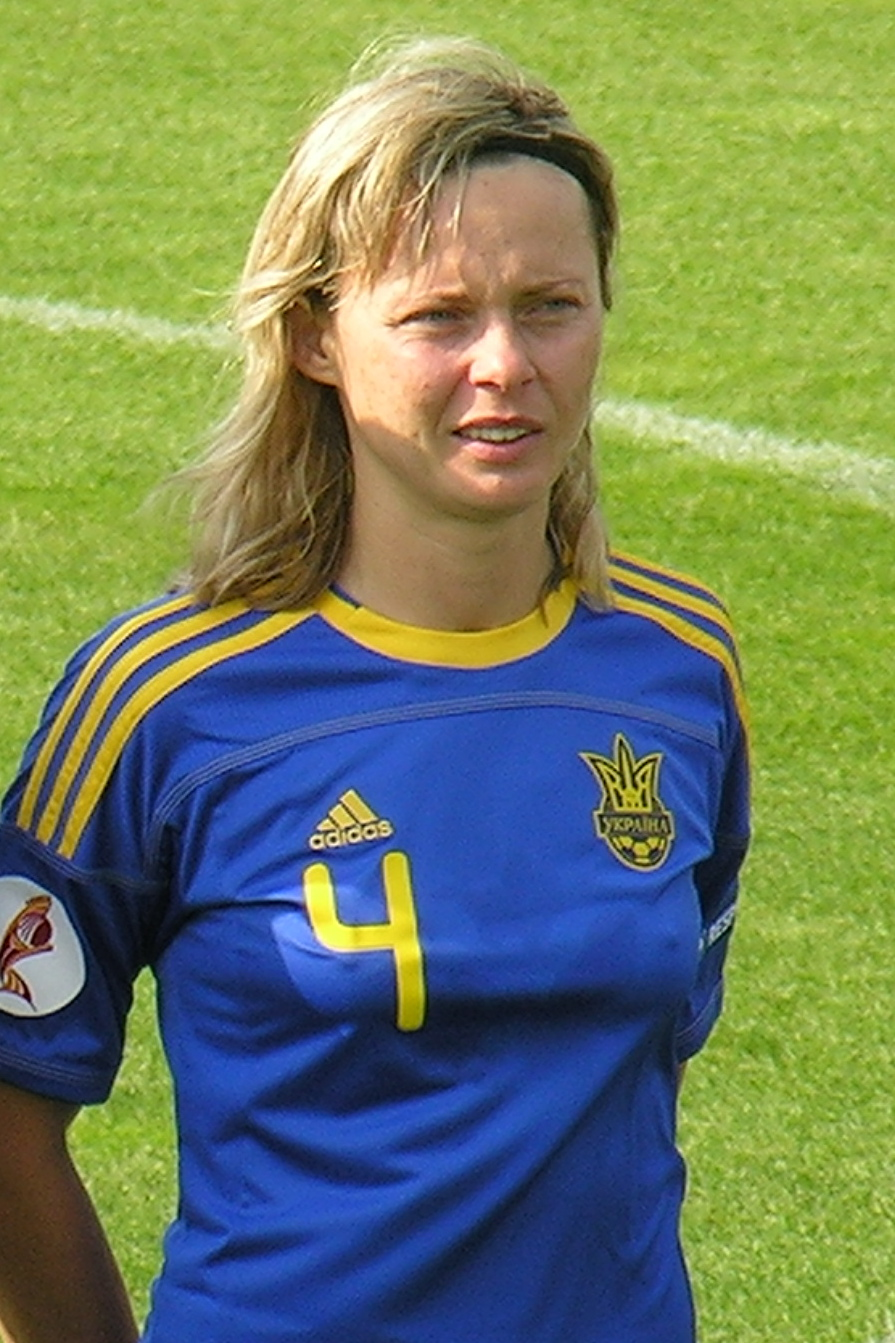

Personal information
- Full name: Valentyna Petrivna Kotyk
- Date of birth: 8 January 1978 (age 48)
- Place of birth: Bilyi Kolodiaz, Soviet Union (now Ukraine)
- Height: 1.68 m (5 ft 6 in)
- Position: Defender

Senior career*
Years	Team	Apps	(Gls)
- Zhytlobud-1 Kharkiv

International career^{‡}
2007–2014	Ukraine	42	(0)

Managerial career
- Zhytlobud-1 Kharkiv
- * Club domestic league appearances and goals ‡ National team caps and goals as of 29 October 2014

Valentyna Petrivna Kotyk (Ukrainian: Валентина Котик; born 8 January 1978) is a Ukrainian football manager and a former player who played as a defender. She has been a member of the Ukraine women's national team.

== Biography ==
Valentyna Kotyk is a Ukrainian female footballer and coach. Born in the village of Bely Kolodyaz in the Kharkiv Oblast, Valentyna grew up in the Poltava region and was involved in athletics from a young age. She showed an interest for sports from a young age and at the age of 16, she moved to a sports school in Zaporizhzhia to hone her skills. Three years later, she started playing football and joined the "Iskra" football club, later renamed as "Graphit".

In Russia, Valentyna played for Shakhty's "Don-Tex" for two years before moving on to the "Ryazan-TNK" club, which was the reigning champion of Russia and played in the Women's Champions League. Despite two seasons with the new team, Valentyna did not achieve much success and moved on to play for "Nadezhda" in Noginsk, before joining the Moscow "Spartak" and then returning back to Nadezhda.

Since 2007, Valentyna has been playing for the women's national football team of Ukraine, and has participated in the final part of the 2009 European Championship. She has also played for several other women's football clubs, including "Zorky" and "Mordovochka".

In 2013, Valentyna returned to Ukraine and continued playing for the Zhiflobud-1 sports club, where she won the championship three times in a row. After retiring as an active player in 2015, Valentyna received a coaching license of category "C" in February 2016, and category "B" in October of the same year. She became the head coach of Zhitlobud-1 FC in December 2017 and was recognized as the best coach of Ukraine in the same year.

Under her leadership, the Zhitlobud-1 FC won the championship and cup, making a golden double. Her team also made it to the group stage of the Champions League in 2017, but lost in the 1/16 finals to a Swedish team from "Linköping". In March 2019, Valentyna gave birth to a son.

== Medals ==
- Champion of Ukraine (3): 2013, 2014, 2015
- Silver medalist Russian Championship (2): 2006, 2011/12
- Bronze medalist Russian Championship (2): 2005, 2007
- Winner of the Ukrainian Cup (3): 2013, 2014, 2015
- Finalist Russian Cup (2): 2006, 2011/12

=== As a coach ===
- Champion of Ukraine (1): 2018
- Winner of the Ukrainian Cup (1): 2018
