= Gloria Slišković =

Bosnian footballer (born 2005)

Personal information
- Date of birth: 4 May 2005 (age 21)
- Place of birth: Nova Bila, Bosnia and Herzegovina
- Height: 1.71 m (5 ft 7 in)
- Position: Defender

Senior career*
Years	Team	Apps	(Gls)
2017–2023	SFK 2000	16	(3)
2023–2026	Juventus FC	1	(0)
2024–2026	→ Napoli (loan)	14	(1)
2026	Hamburger SV	1	(0)

International career^{‡}
2022	Bosnia and Herzegovina U17	2	(0)
2022–	Bosnia and Herzegovina U19	4	(0)
2023–	Bosnia and Herzegovina	4	(0)
- * Club domestic league appearances and goals as of 9 April 2026 ‡ National team caps and goals as of 3 Oct 2023

Gloria Slišković (born 4 May 2005; Nova Bila, near Kiseljak, BiH) is a Bosnian footballer who plays as a defender for the Bosnia and Herzegovina women's national team.
