= Anna Petryk =

Ukrainian footballer

Personal information
- Date of birth: 26 October 1997 (age 29)
- Place of birth: Kyiv, Ukraine
- Position: Midfielder

Team information
- Current team: Sparta Prague
- Number: 25

Senior career*
Years	Team	Apps	(Gls)
2016–2022	Zhytlobud-1	102	
2022	Breiðablik	9	(2)
2022–2024	Vorskla Poltava		
2024–2026	FC Metalist 1925 Kharkiv		
2026–	Sparta Prague	1	(0)

International career^{‡}
2013	Ukraine U17	1	(0)
2014–2015	Ukraine U19	8	(0)
2020–	Ukraine	47	(1)
- * Club domestic league appearances and goals as of 3 December 2024 ‡ National team caps and goals as of 2 December 2024

Anna Petryk (born 26 October 1997) is a Ukrainian footballer who plays as a midfielder for Sparta Prague in the Czech Women's First League and the Ukraine women's national team.

She returned to Ukraine after six months, joining Vorskla Poltava with whom she won back-to-back league and cup doubles for the 2022–23 and 2023-24 seasons, before rejoining Zhytlobud-1, now playing under their new name of FC Metalist 1925 Kharkiv.

== Playing career ==
After playing the majority of her career with the Women's League club WFC Zhytlobud-1 Kharkiv, Petryk signed with Breiðablik in the Icelandic Besta-deild kvenna in March 2022.

On 10 July 2026, Petryk signed a contract with Czech Women's First League club Sparta Prague. She made her league debut for the club on 15 August 2026 in a 4–0 home win against Prague Raptors.
