= Olena Mazurenko =

Ukrainian footballer (born 1969)

Personal information
- Full name: Olena Pavlivna Mazurenko
- Date of birth: 24 October 1969 (age 57)
- Place of birth: Kyiv
- Position: Defender

Senior career*
Years	Team	Apps	(Gls)
1989–1994	Dynamo Kyiv		
1995	Energy Voronezh		
1996–1999	Donchanka Donetsk		
2000	Ryazan-VDV		
2000–2012	1. FC Nürnberg		

International career
1992–2009	Ukraine	83	(4)
- * Club domestic league appearances and goals

Olena Pavlivna Mazurenko (Ukrainian: Олена Павлівна Мазуренко; born 24 October 1969) is a Ukrainian former footballer who played as a defender. She has been a member of the Ukraine women's national team.
