= Roksolana Kravchuk =

Ukrainian footballer (born 1997)

Roksolana Kravchuk Роксолана Кравчук (Ukrainian)
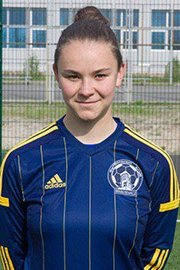

Personal information
- Full name: Roksolana Mykolayivna Kravchuk
- Date of birth: 7 November 1997 (age 29)
- Place of birth: Turiisk, Ukraine
- Position: Midfielder

Team information
- Current team: Slavia Prague
- Number: 29

Senior career*
Years	Team	Apps	(Gls)
- Zhytlobud-2
- Vorskla Poltava
2022	Slavia Prague	6	(2)
2026–	Slavia Prague	1	(0)

International career^{‡}
2013	Ukraine U17	3	(0)
2014–2015	Ukraine U19	6	(0)
2020–	Ukraine	44	(7)
- * Club domestic league appearances and goals ‡ National team caps and goals as of 1 December 2025

Roksolana Mykolayivna Kravchuk (Ukrainian: Роксолана Миколаївна Кравчук; born 7 November 1997) is a Ukrainian footballer who plays as a midfielder for Czech Women's First League club Slavia Prague and the Ukraine women's national team.

== Club career ==
Kravchuk has played for Zhytlobud-2 in Ukraine. She played for Slavia Prague in the Czech Republic.

== International career ==
Kravchuk capped for Ukraine at senior level during the UEFA Women's Euro 2022 qualifying.

== International goals ==
No.	Date	Venue	Opponent	Score	Result	Competition
1.	21 October 2021	Kolos Stadium, Kovalivka, Ukraine	Faroe Islands	2–0	4–0	2023 FIFA Women's World Cup qualification
2.	26 November 2021	Hampden Park, Glasgow, Scotland	Scotland	1–0	1–1	2023 FIFA Women's World Cup qualification
3.	23 February 2024	Arena Arda, Kardzhali, Bulgaria	Bulgaria	1–0	4–0	2023–24 UEFA Women's Nations League play-off matches
4.	12 July 2024	Fadil Vokrri Stadium, Pristina, Kosovo	Kosovo	4–0	4–0	UEFA Women's Euro 2025 qualifying
5.	16 July 2024	Petar Miloševski Training Centre, Skopje, North Macedonia	Croatia	2–0	2–0	UEFA Women's Euro 2025 qualifying
6.	28 November 2025	Estadio Municipal de Chapín, Jerez de la Frontera, Spain	Scotland	1–0	1–1	Friendly
7.	1 December 2025	Estadio El Palmar, Sanlucar de Barrameda, Spain	Austria	2–1	3–2	Friendly
