= Olha Basanska =

Ukrainian footballer

Olga Basanska
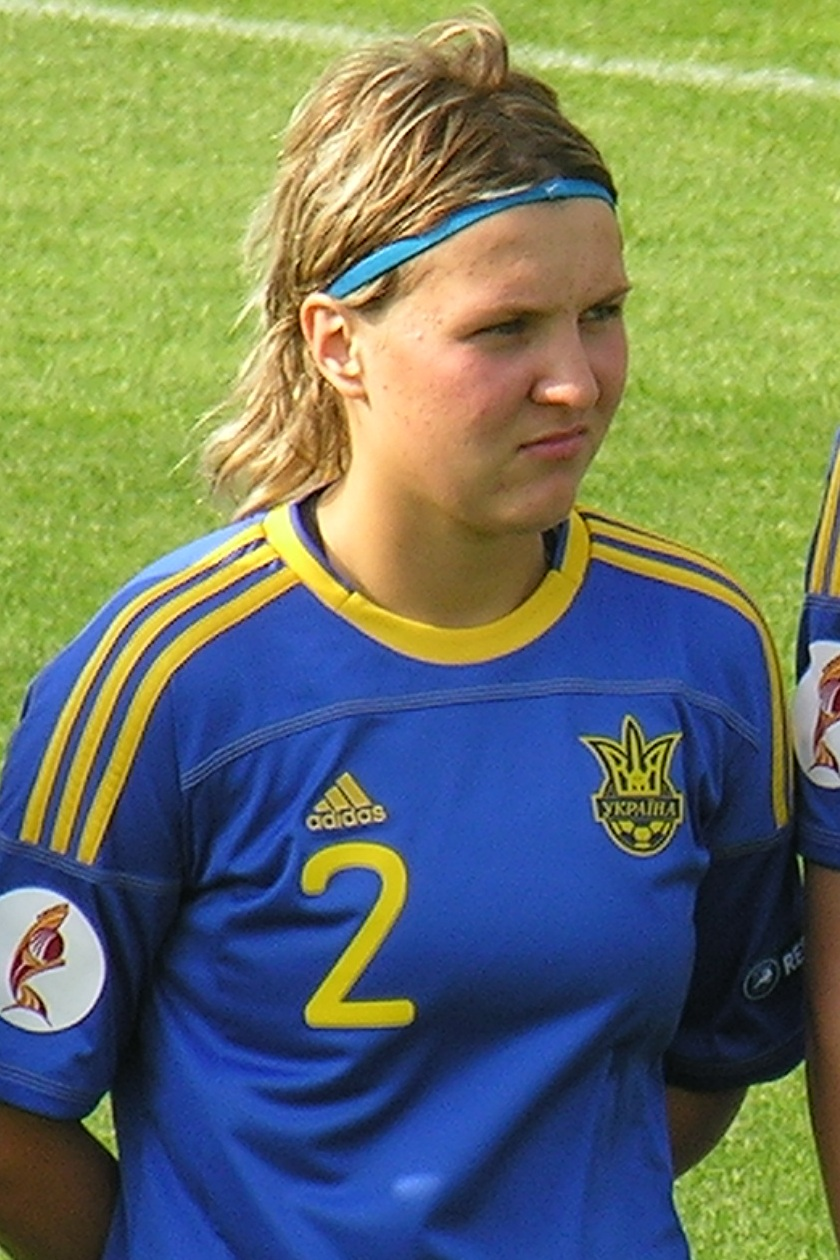

Personal information
- Date of birth: 6 January 1992 (age 34)
- Place of birth: Nikopol, Ukraine
- Position: Defender

Team information
- Current team: Zhytlobud-1 Kharkiv

Senior career*
Years	Team	Apps	(Gls)
2012-2018	Ryazan-VDV	103	(5)

International career
2011-	Ukraine	45	(2)
- * Club domestic league appearances and goals

Olga Basanska (Ukrainian: Ольга Олександрівна Басанська, born 6 January 1992) is a Ukrainian footballer who plays as a defender and has appeared for the Ukraine women's national team.

== Career ==
Basanska is a native of the Ukrainian industrial city of Nikopol, located on the banks of the Dnieper.

Basanska has been capped for the Ukraine national team, appearing for the team during the 2019 FIFA Women's World Cup qualifying cycle.

In 2019, five years into the Russo-Ukrainian war, director of the Russian club Ryazan-VDV claimed that she was forced to release Basanska due to "psychological pressure" from her homeland. The Russian Airborne Troops are known also by their acronym VDV and were among the first who were used during the 2014 Russian aggression against Ukraine.
