= Natalya Zinchenko =

Ukrainian footballer and manager (born 1979)

Nataliya Zinchenko
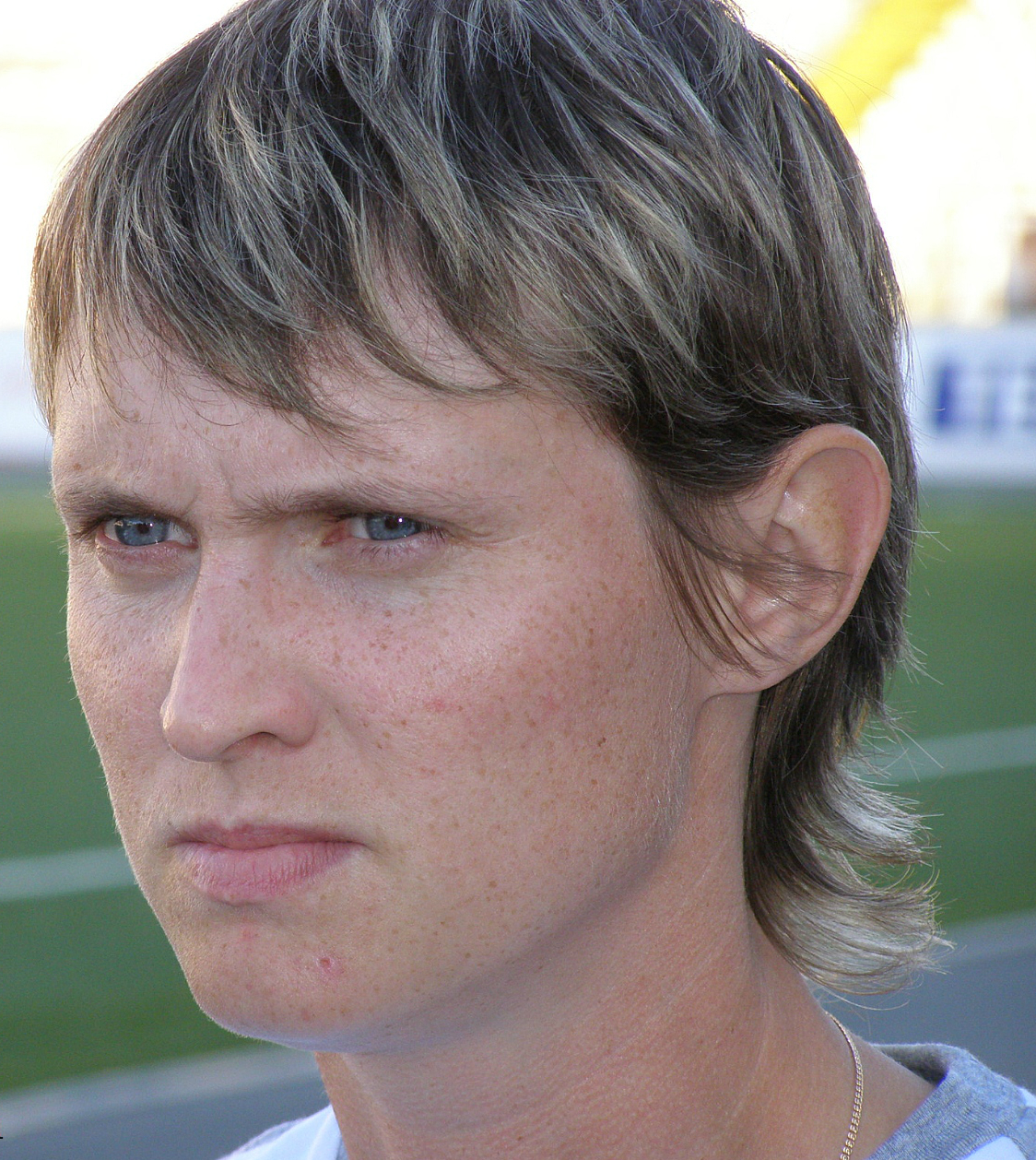

Personal information
- Date of birth: 3 October 1979 (age 47)
- Place of birth: Desna, Kozelets Raion, Ukraine
- Height: 1.69 m (5 ft 7 in)
- Position: Midfielder

Team information
- Current team: Metalist 1925 Kharkiv (manager)

Senior career*
Years	Team	Apps	(Gls)
1992–1994	Lehenda Chernihiv	51	(29)
1995	Alina Kiev	14	(0)
1996	Donchanka	7	(0)
1997–2002	Ryazan		(17)
2002–2004	Energiya Voronezh		(10)
2005–2006	Ryazan		(24)
2007–2010	Zvezda Perm		

International career
1995–2010	Ukraine		

Managerial career
- 2011–2012: Zvezda Perm
- 2013–2018: Ukraine U19 (women)
- 2012–: Zhytlobud-2 Kharkiv
- 2018–2021: Ukraine (women)
- 2021–2025: Vorskla Poltava
- 2025–: Metalist 1925 Kharkiv
- * Club domestic league appearances and goals

Nataliya Zinchenko (Ukrainian: Наталія Зінченко; born 3 October 1979) is a Ukrainian football coach and former player who serves as the head coach of Metalist 1925 Kharkiv.

== Club career ==
Zinchenko joined Zvezda Perm in 2007 and furthermore served as the team's captain; under his tenure, the team reached the final of the 2008–09 UEFA Women's Cup. She previously played for Ryazan VDV. After having retired due to injury in 2010 she replaced Shek Borkowski as the manager at Zvezda Perm.

Throughout her career she won seven Russian leagues, two Russian cups, two Ukrainian leagues and one Ukrainian cup.

== International career ==
Zinchenko was a member of the Ukraine national team and played her debut 22 October 1995 against Hungary.
