= FC Metalist 1925 Kharkiv (women) =

Ukrainian women's association football club

Kharkiv
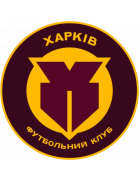
- Full name: Football Club Kharkiv
- Founded: 2006 (as Zhytlobud-1 Kharkiv)
- Stadium: KhTZ Stadium, Kharkiv; Olimpiyets Stadium, Liubotyn
- Chairman: (Ukraine) Oleksandr Kharchenko
- Coach: (Ukraine) Natalya Zinchenko
- League: Ukrainian Women's Elite League
- 2025–26: 1st
- Website: https://fckharkiv.com/team/women
Home colours	Away colours

former logo

The Football Club Kharkiv is a Ukrainian professional women's football team of FC Kharkiv from Kharkiv, Ukraine. Established in 2006 as Zhytlobud-1 Kharkiv (Zhilstroi-1), from 2023 to 2026, it carried the name of Metalist 1925 after aligning with a men's football club. In 2026, FC Metalist 1925 became FC Kharkiv. Since 2015, it has been a leader in women's professional football in Ukraine, holding the most national titles.

== History ==
In 2006 the female team received financial support from the Kharkiv construction company "Zhytlobud-1" and was named after it as Zhytlobud-1 Kharkiv, in the Russian variant Zhilstroi-1. The newly formed club has gained many players from another Kharkiv-based club, Arsenal, which was falling apart at that time. Oleh Ruban and Yaroslav Latsfer, who knew each other at Metalist Kharkiv, were placed in charge of the newly formed team. Led by Latsfer from 2009 to 2015, Zhytlobud won five consecutive seasons (2011–2015). After winning the 2015 season, Zhytlobud-1 set a new record for the most titles in the league (7), surpassing the records of Lehenda Chernihiv (6 titles) and Donchanka Donetsk (5 titles). Its winning run was interrupted by another Kharkiv club, Zhytlobud-2, which later became Vorskla Poltava.

Following the 2022 full-scale Russian invasion of Ukraine, the club suspended its participation in professional football, while its junior team, Persha Stolytsia, competed in the Swiss football competitions. In 2023, the club renewed its participation in cooperation with another football club, Metalist 1925. It changed its name from Zhytlobud-1 to Metalist 1925 on 20 March 2024 after both clubs were fully integrated.

== Stadium ==
The club's home stadium is Olimpiyets in the city of Liubotyn, not far from Kharkiv. Some of their games were played in Kharkiv's stadiums Metalist and KhTZ.

Following the full-scale Russian invasion in 2022, the Kharkiv team relocated to Kyiv and plays their games in the Kyiv's exurbs.

== Honours ==
Ukrainian Women's Higher League

- Winners (11): 2006, 2008, 2011, 2012, 2013, 2014, 2015, 2017–18, 2018–19, 2020–21, 2025–26
- Runners-up (6): 2007, 2010, 2016, 2017, 2019–20, (2021–22), 2024–25

Ukrainian Women's Cup

- Winners (12): 2006, 2007, 2008, 2010, 2011, 2013, 2014, 2015, 2016, 2017–18, 2018–19, 2025–26
- Runners-up (3): 2009, 2020–21, 2024–25

== Current squad ==
As of 9 May 2026

Goalkeepers	Defenders	Midfielders	Forwards
(Ukraine) Iryna Slavich (Ukraine) Maria Denishich (Ukraine) Daryna Bondarchuk	(Ukraine) Yana Kotik (Ukraine) Oleksandra Krevska (Ukraine) Olha Basanska (Armenia) Khristine Oleksanyan (Ukraine) Irina Podolska (Ukraine) Lesia Olkhova (Ukraine) Marina Shainyuk	(Ukraine) Viktoriya Hiryn (Ukraine) Nonna Grinishin (Ukraine) Daria Apanaschenko (Ukraine) Milena Ivanchenko (Ukraine) Lydia Zaborovets (Ukraine) Evelina Kuptsova (Ukraine) Nadiya Kunina (Ukraine) Anna Petryk (Ukraine) Julia Shevchuk (Ukraine) Tamila Khimich	(Ukraine) Veronica Andrukhiv (Ukraine) Elizaveta Molodiuk (Ukraine) Daria Kolodiy (Ukraine) Arina Pascarenko (Ukraine) Daria Bilodid

=== Former internationals ===
- Ukraine: Iya Andrushchak, Olha Basanska, Svitlana Frishko, Valentyna Kotyk, Maryna Masalska, Olha Ovdiychuk, Nataliya Sukhorukova, Inessa Tytova
- Belarus: Hanna Tatarynova
- Lithuania: Raimonda Kudytė

== Coaching staff ==
- Head coach: Natalia Zinchenko
- Assistant coach: Maryna Masalska
- Coach-analytic: Dmytro Synyak
- Goalkeeping coach: Oleksandr Mytko

== Managers ==
- 2006 – 2009: Oleh Ruban
- 2009 – 2016: Yaroslav Lantsfer
- 2016 – 2017: Valentyn Kryachko
- 2017 – 2019: Valentyna Kotyk
- 2019: Maksym Rakhayev (interim)
- 2019 – 2020: Serhiy Sapronov
- 2020 – 2022: Valentyna Kotyk
- 2022 – 2023: team didn't play in Championship of Ukraine
- 2023 – 2025: Volodymyr Pyatenko
- 2025 – : Natalya Zinchenko

== European record ==
Metalist 1925 Kharkiv made their debut in European competitions on 9 August 2007 as Zhytlobud-1 in the 2007–08 UEFA Women's Cup qualifying round. They faced the Dinamo Tbilisi women's team and won 14:0. Vera Djatel scored 7 goals in that game.

== Reserves ==
=== Persha Stolytsia ===
The reserve team "Persha Stolytsia" was formed in 2021 and was based in Zmiiv, Kharkiv Oblast. Competing in the Ukrainian second tier of women's football competitions, it was playing its games at the local stadium, "Avanhard" and "Olimpiyets" in Lyubotyn. The first game the team played was on August 20, 2021, when they hosted Shakhtar Donetsk. Persha Stolytsia lost the match 0:11. The first win came on October 5, 2021, when Persha Stolytsia outplayed Kobra Bilokurakyne 7:0.
