= Ukraine women's national football team =

Women's national association football team representing Ukraine

Ukraine
- Nickname: Zhinky
- Association: Ukrainian Association of Football (UAF); Українська Асоціація Футболу
- Confederation: UEFA (Europe)
- Head coach: Iya Andrushchak
- Captain: Daryna Apanashchenko
- Most caps: Daryna Apanashchenko (157)
- Top scorer: Daryna Apanashchenko (66)
- Home stadium: Arena Lviv, Lviv (following Russian aggression); Stadion imeni Haharyna, Chernihiv
- FIFA code: UKR
First colours	Second colours

FIFA ranking
- Current: 32 ▲2 (20 October 2026)
- Highest: 16 (June 2008 – June 2009)
- Lowest: 35 (December 2021 – March 2022; June – December 2024; June 2025)

First international
- Ukraine 0–0 Moldova (Kyiv, Ukraine; 30 June 1992)

Biggest win
- Ukraine 8–0 Belarus (Kyiv, Ukraine; 2 August 2014)

Biggest defeat
- Ukraine 0–8 Germany (Lviv, Ukraine; 3 September 2019); Germany 8–0 Ukraine (Aachen, Germany; 5 October 2019); Japan 8–0 Ukraine (Hiroshima, Japan; 10 June 2021)

European Championship
- Appearances: 1 (first in 2009)
- Best result: Group stage (2009)

The Ukraine women's national football team (Ukrainian: Жіноча збірна України з футболу, romanized: Zhinocha zbirna Ukraini z futbolu) represents Ukraine in international women's football. The team is administered by the Ukrainian Association of Football.

The team has been playing since 30 June 1992, when it hosted a team from Moldova. Before its first official tournament, the UEFA Women's Euro 1995 qualifying phase, the Ukraine women's team played at least four more friendlies with Belarus in 1993. The first team consisted of the following players: Tetyana Ovcharenko (goalkeeper) – Olena Mazurenko, Svitlana Balynska, Olena Chubarova, Alina Doroshchuk – Tetyana Shvets, Iryna Serhiyenko, Lyudmyla Pokotylo, Halyna Prykhodko – Tetyana Verezubova, Svitlana Frishko; and substitutes: Valentyna Ryabichenko (goalkeeper) – Inesa Titova – Yulia Bayeka, Natalia Melnychenko, Lyudmyla Protsenko – Olena Vdovyka, Tetyana Vyshnyakova, Halyna Zonova.

The first major tournament Ukraine qualified for was the UEFA Women's Euro 2009 hosted in Finland.

== Team image ==
=== Nicknames ===
The Ukraine women's national football team has been known or nicknamed as the "Zhinky".

=== Home stadium ===
The Ukraine women's national football team hosts their home matches at Arena Lviv (before the Russian aggression games were hosted at Stadion imeni Gagarina).

- record since 2007

Venue	City	Played	Won	Drawn	Lost	GF	GA	Points per game
Stadion imeni Gagarina	Chernihiv	13	8	2	3	29	12	2
Arena Lviv	Lviv	13	6	3	4	28	23	1.62
Obolon Arena	Kyiv	3	3	0	0	7	1	3
Sevastopol Sports Complex	Sevastopol	3	1	0	2	7	4	1
Stadion Illichivets	Mariupol	2	2	0	0	8	1	3
Stadion Ukrayina	Lviv	2	1	1	0	3	2	2
Stadion imeni Bannikova	Kyiv	1	1	0	0	8	0	3
Ternopilsky Misky Stadion	Ternopil	1	1	0	0	2	0	3

== Results and fixtures ==
The following is a list of match results in the last 12 months, as well as any future matches that have been scheduled.

Legend

Win Draw Loss Fixture

=== 2025 ===
28 November Friendly	Ukraine	1–1	Scotland	Jerez de la Frontera, Spain
12:00 UTC+1	Kravchuk 38'	Report	McAneny 90+6'	Stadium: Estadio Municipal de Chapín; Referee: Gabriela Arce (Paraguay)

1 December Friendly	Ukraine	3–2	Austria	Sanlucar de Barrameda, Spain
12:00 UTC+1	Kozlova 14'; Kravchuk 18'; Ovdiychuk 47'	Report	Hillebrand 1'; Kotyk 28' (o.g.)	Stadium: Estadio El Palmar; Referee: Caroline Lanssens (Belgium)

=== 2026 ===
3 March 2027 FIFA Women's World Cup qualification	Ukraine	1–6	England	Antalya, Turkey (Note: Due to the Russian invasion of Ukraine, Ukraine are required to play their home matches at neutral venues until further notice.)
18:00 UTC+3	Kalinina 58'	Report	Russo 47', 51'; Stanway 64' (pen.), 70'; Park 78', 89'	Stadium: Mardan Sports Complex; Attendance: 275; Referee: Catarina Campos (Portugal)

7 March 2027 FIFA Women's World Cup qualification	Ukraine	1–3	Spain	Antalya, Turkey
18:00 UTC+3	Ovdiychuk 76'	Report	Imade 44'; L. Corrales 45+3'; López 55' (pen.)	Stadium: Mardan Sports Complex; Attendance: 264; Referee: Maïka Vanderstichel (France)

14 April 2027 FIFA Women's World Cup qualification	Iceland	1–0	Ukraine	Reykjavík, Iceland
18:30 UTC+0	Jóhannsdóttir 47'	Report		Stadium: Laugardalsvöllur; Attendance: 1,453; Referee: Shona Shukrula (Netherlands)

18 April 2027 FIFA Women's World Cup qualification	Spain	5–0	Ukraine	Córdoba, Spain
16:00 UTC+2	Imade 2', 47'; Méndez 61'; Navarro 71'; López 76'	Report		Stadium: Estadio Nuevo Arcángel; Attendance: 10,768; Referee: Fabienne Michel (Germany)

5 June 2027 FIFA Women's World Cup qualification	Ukraine	0–1	Iceland	Mielec, Poland
18:00 UTC+2		Report	Pálmadóttir 25'	Stadium: Stadion Stali Mielec; Attendance: 214; Referee: Hristiyana Guteva (Bulgaria)

9 June 2027 FIFA Women's World Cup qualification	England	3–0	Ukraine	Liverpool, England
20:00 UTC+1	Carter 14'; Stanway 37'; Mead 67'	Report		Stadium: Hill Dickinson Stadium; Attendance: 26,065; Referee: Emanuela Rusta (Albania)

9 October 2027 FIFA Women's World Cup play-offs 1st leg	Slovakia	1–3	Ukraine	Prešov, Slovakia
18:00 UTC+2	Šurnovská 42'	Report	Hiryn 10'; Andrukhiv 47'; Boychuk 52'	Stadium: Futbal Tatran Arena; Attendance: 1,907; Referee: Ivana Projkovska (North Macedonia)

13 October 2027 FIFA Women's World Cup play-offs 2nd leg	Ukraine	1–0 (4–1 agg.)	Slovakia	Košice, Slovakia
17:00 UTC+2	Andrukhiv 45'	Report		Stadium: Košická futbalová aréna Referee: Ewa Augustyn (Poland)
Note: Ukraine won 4–1 on aggregate and advanced to the second play-off round.

1 December 2027 FIFA Women's World Cup play-offs 1st leg	Ukraine	v	England	San Pedro, Spain
18:00 UTC+1		Report		Stadium: Pinatar Arena

5 December 2027 FIFA Women's World Cup play-offs 2nd leg	England	v	Ukraine	London, England
17:30 UTC+0		Report		Stadium: Wembley Stadium

- Ukraine Results and Fixtures – Soccerway.com

== Coaching staff ==
=== Current coaching staff ===
As of 12 February 2026

Role	Name
Head coach	Iya Andrushchak
Assistant coach	Valeriy Kryventsov
Goalkeeping coach	Andriy Dykan
Coach-scout	Yevhen Katkalo
Fitness coach	Viktoriya Petrovych
National teams vertical coordinator	Oleksandr Funderat

=== Manager history ===
Period	Manager	Ref.
1992–1993	(Ukraine) Oleksandr Chubarov	
1994–2000	(Ukraine) Serhiy Kachkarov	
2000–2002	(Ukraine) Anatoliy Piskovets	
2003–2004	(Ukraine) Mykola Lytvyn	
2005–2006	(Ukraine) Volodymyr Kulayev	
2007–2014	(Ukraine) Anatoliy Kutsev	
2015–2018	(Ukraine) Volodymyr Reva	
2018–2021	(Ukraine) Natalya Zinchenko	
2021–2023	(Spain) Lluís Cortés	
2023–2026	(Ukraine) Volodymyr Pyatenko	
2026–present	(Ukraine) Iya Andrushchak	

== Players ==
=== Current squad ===
The following players were called up for the 2027 FIFA Women's World Cup qualification matches against Slovakia.

Caps and goals correct as of 9 June 2026, after the match against England.

No.	Pos.	Player	Date of birth (age)	Caps	Goals	Club
1	GK	Kateryna Boklach	16 January 2004 (age 22)	4	0	(Royal Belgian Football Association) RAAL La Louvière
12	GK	Darya Kelyushyk	21 November 2003 (age 23)	19	0	(Ukrainian Association of Football) Kolos Kovalivka
23	GK	Kateryna Samson	5 July 1988 (age 38)	58	0	(Ukrainian Association of Football) FC Seasters
3	DF	Anna Petryk	26 October 1997 (age 29)	60	2	(Football Association of the Czech Republic) Sparta Prague
4	DF	Yana Kotyk	28 June 2003 (age 23)	19	2	(Scottish Football Association) Glasgow City
8	DF	Marina Shayniuk	26 October 2000 (age 26)	12	0	(Ukrainian Association of Football) Metalist 1925 Kharkiv
14	DF	Lyubov Shmatko	25 October 1993 (age 33)	70	8	(Ukrainian Association of Football) Metalist 1925 Kharkiv
18	DF	Kateryna Korsu	28 August 1995 (age 31)	34	2	(Football Association of the Czech Republic) Slavia Prague
21	DF	Lesia Olkhova	9 January 2004 (age 22)	8	0	(Ukrainian Association of Football) Metalist 1925 Kharkiv
	DF	Anastasia Voronina	27 July 1993 (age 33)	2	0	(Ukrainian Association of Football) FC Seasters
	DF	Yana Derkach	10 July 1998 (age 28)	4	0	(Turkish Football Federation) Besiktas
5	MF	Veronika Andrukhiv	5 May 1996 (age 30)	68	7	(Ukrainian Association of Football) Metalist 1925 Kharkiv
6	MF	Dayana Semkiv	29 July 2004 (age 22)	30	0	(Ukrainian Association of Football) Kolos Kovalivka
7	MF	Yana Kalinina	14 November 1994 (age 32)	81	10	(Ukrainian Association of Football) FC Seasters
10	MF	Viktoriya Hiryn	24 October 2000 (age 26)	26	1	(Ukrainian Association of Football) Metalist 1925 Kharkiv
13	MF	Lidia Zaborovets	4 April 2006 (age 20)	7	0	(Ukrainian Association of Football) Metalist 1925 Kharkiv
15	MF	Nadiia Kunina	29 March 2000 (age 26)	43	6	(Ukrainian Association of Football) Metalist 1925 Kharkiv
17	MF	Yulia Khrystyuk	7 April 2003 (age 23)	7	1	(Scottish Football Association) Hibernian
21	MF	Tamila Khimich	13 September 1994 (age 32)	70	6	(Ukrainian Association of Football) Metalist 1925 Kharkiv
9	FW	Tanya Boychuk	20 June 2000 (age 26)	4	0	(Canadian Soccer Association) Montreal Roses FC
11	FW	Yelyzaveta Molodyuk	24 February 2004 (age 22)	13	0	(Ukrainian Association of Football) Metalist 1925 Kharkiv
19	FW	Roksolana Kravchuk	7 November 1997 (age 29)	47	7	(Football Association of the Czech Republic) Slavia Prague
20	FW	Inna Hlushchenko	12 May 2004 (age 22)	39	3	(French Football Federation) Saint-Étienne
	FW	Victoria Ostapiv	10 April 2004 (age 22)	0	0	(Ukrainian Association of Football) Kolos Kovalivka

=== Recent call-ups ===
The following players have also been called up to the squad within the past 12 months.

Pos.	Player	Date of birth (age)	Caps	Goals	Club	Latest call-up
GK	Ulyana Solovyova ^{PRE}	14 May 2008 (age 18)	0	0	(Ukraine) Kryvbas Kryvyi Rih	v. Iceland, 5 June 2026
DF	Kateryna Korsun ^{INJ}	28 August 1995 (age 31)	41	2	(Ukraine) Vorskla Poltava	v. Iceland, 5 June 2026
DF	Diana Tkachuk ^{PRE}	7 June 2007 (age 19)	0	0	(Ukraine) Ladomyr	v. Iceland, 5 June 2026
DF	Daryna Apanashchenko (captain)	16 May 1986 (age 40)	157	66	(Ukraine) Metalist 1925 Kharkiv	v. Spain, 18 April 2026
DF	Solomiya Kupyak	7 June 2000 (age 26)	3	0	(Ukraine) Kolos Kovalivka	v. Austria, 1 December 2025
MF	Yana Kalinina ^{INJ}	14 November 1994 (age 32)	81	10	(Ukraine) Vorskla Poltava	v. Iceland, 5 June 2026
MF	Veronika Andrukhiv	5 May 1996 (age 30)	68	7	(Ukraine) Kolos Kovalivka	v. Spain, 18 April 2026
MF	Nicole Kozlova	8 July 2000 (age 26)	52	9	(Scotland) Glasgow City F.C.	v. England, 3 March 2026
MF	Natia Pantsulaia	28 December 1991 (age 34)	65	2	(Ukraine) Metalist 1925 Kharkiv	v. Austria, 1 December 2025
MF	Dayana Semkiv	29 July 2004 (age 22)	26	0	(Ukraine) Kolos Kovalivka	v. Romania, 28 October 2025
MF	Yana Malakhova	17 February 1995 (age 31)	22	1	(Slovenia) Mura	v. Romania, 28 October 2025
MF	Viktoria Radionova	13 June 2005 (age 21)	3	0	(Ukraine) Vorskla Poltava	v. Romania, 28 October 2025
MF	Viktoriya Hiryn ^{MED}	24 October 2000 (age 26)	26	1	(Ukraine) Metalist 1925 Kharkiv	v. Slovakia, 25 October 2025
MF	Victoria Ostapiv ^{PRE}	10 April 2004 (age 22)	0	0	(Ukraine) Kolos Kovalivka	v. Iceland, 5 June 2026
FW	Olga Ovdiychuk (captain)	16 December 1993 (age 32)	106	20	(Turkey) Fomget GSK	v. Spain, 18 April 2026
Notes: ^{INJ} = Withdrew due to injury; ^{MED} = Withdrew due to medical reasons; ^{PRE} = Preliminary squad; ^{RET} = Retired from national team

== Records ==
As of 9 June 2026

Players in bold are still active with the national team.

=== Most appearances ===
Rank	Player	Career	Caps	Goals
1	**Darya Apanashchenko**	2002–present	157	66
2	**Olha Ovdiychuk**	2012–present	106	20
3	Lyudmyla Pekur	1997–2016	104	25
4	**Olha Basanska**	2010–present	99	5
5	Vira Dyatel	2000–2018	91	21
6	Olena Mazurenko	1992–2009	83	4
7	**Yana Kalinina**	2015–present	81	10
8	Svitlana Frishko	1992–2011	79	31
9	Tetyana Chorna	1997–2015	74	5
10	**Lyubov Shmatko**	2016–present	70	8
10	**Tamila Khimych**	2015–present	70	6

=== Top goalscorers ===
Rank	Player	Career	Goals	Caps	Avg.
1	**Daryna Apanashchenko**	2002–present	66	157	0.42
2	Svitlana Frishko	1992–2011	31	79	0.39
3	Lyudmyla Pekur	1997–2016	25	104	0.24
4	Nataliya Zinchenko	1994–2009	23	66	0.35
5	Vira Dyatel	2000–2018	21	91	0.23
6	**Olha Ovdiychuk**	2012–present	20	106	0.19
7	Olha Boychenko	2008–2021	17	63	0.27
7	Tetyana Verezubova	1992–2006	17	64	0.27
9	Tetyana Romanenko	2009–2023	11	68	0.16
10	**Yana Kalinina**	2015–present	10	81	0.12

== Competitive record ==
=== FIFA Women's World Cup ===
Champions Runners-up Third place Fourth place

FIFA Women's World Cup record										Qualification record							
Year	Round	Position	Pld	W	D*	L	GF	GA	Squad	Pld	W	D	L	GF	GA	→	Outcome
1991 as Part of Soviet Union										1991 as Part of Soviet Union							
as Ukraine										as Ukraine							
(Sweden) 1995	Did not qualify									Same as UEFA Euro 1995							
(United States) 1999	Did not qualify									8	3	1	4	10	19	1998	2nd in Qualifying group 1 (Class A), lost to Germany in play-off
(United States) 2003	Did not qualify									6	2	1	3	9	12	2003	3rd in Qualifying group 1 (Class A)
(China) 2007	Did not qualify									8	5	1	2	20	11	2007	2nd in Qualifying group 1 (First Category)
(Germany) 2011	Did not qualify									12	5	3	4	24	15	2011	1st in Qualifying group 4, lost to Norway and Italy in play-off
(Canada) 2015	Did not qualify									12	7	2	3	37	13	2015	2nd in Qualifying group 6, lost to Italy in play-off
(France) 2019	Did not qualify									8	4	1	3	9	10	2019	3rd in Qualifying group 4
(Australia) (New Zealand) 2023	Did not qualify									8	3	1	4	12	20	2023	3rd in Qualifying group B
(Brazil) 2027	Qualification in progress									8	2	0	6	6	20	2027	
(Costa Rica) (Jamaica) (Mexico) (United States) 2031	To be determined									To be determined						2031	
(United Kingdom) 2035	To be determined									To be determined						2035	
Total	-	0/8	-	-	-	-	-	-	-	70	31	10	29	127	120		

* Denotes draws include knock-out matches decided on penalty kicks.

=== UEFA Women's Championship ===
Champions Runners-up Third place Fourth place

UEFA Women's Championship record										Qualifying record									
Year	Round	Position	Pld	W	D*	L	GF	GA	Squad	Pld	W	D*	L	GF	GA	P/R	RK	→	Outcome
1984 to 1991 as part of Soviet Union										1984 to 1991 as part of Soviet Union									
as Ukraine										as Ukraine									
(Italy) 1993	Did not enter									Did not enter									
(Germany) 1995	Did not qualify									6	2	1	3	9	12	–		1995	3rd in Qualifying group 2, relegated to Class B
(Norway) 1997	Did not qualify									8	6	1	1	17	5	–		1997	1st in Qualifying group 8, won over Romania in play-off and promoted to Class A
(Germany) 2001	Did not qualify									8	1	2	5	7	18	–		2001	3rd in Qualifying group 3, lost to England in play-off
(England) 2005	Did not qualify									8	2	1	5	7	21	–		2005	4th in Qualifying group 4
(Finland) 2009	Group stage	10th	3	1	0	2	2	4	Squad	10	8	1	1	20	3	–		2009	2nd in Qualifying group 5, beat Slovenia in play-off
(Sweden) 2013	Did not qualify									10	5	1	4	22	10	–		2013	2nd in Qualifying group 5, lost to Iceland in play-off
(Netherlands) 2017	Did not qualify									8	4	1	3	14	12	–		2017	3rd in Qualifying group 3
(England) 2022	Did not qualify									10	5	0	5	17	25	–		2022	2nd in Qualifying group I, lost to Northern Ireland in play-off
(Switzerland) 2025	Did not qualify									10	4	3	3	15	9	(Note: From Euro 2025 onwards a new qualifying format was introduced, linked to the Women's Nations League where teams are divided into leagues with promotion/relegation between the leagues at the end of each cycle.)	22nd	2025	2nd in qualifying group B4, beat Turkey in play-off round 1, lost to Belgium in play-off round 2
(Germany) 2029	To be determined									To be determined									
Total	Group stage	1/10	3	1	0	2	2	4		78	38	11	29	128	115	22nd			

=== UEFA Women's Nations League ===
UEFA Women's Nations League record
Season	League	Group	Pos	Pld	W	D	L	GF	GA	P/R	RK
2023–24	B	3	3rd	8	4	0	4	12	7	*	27th
2025	B	4	1st	6	4	1	1	8	6	▲	20th
Total				14	8	1	5	20	13	20th	

▲	Promoted at end of season
Same position	No movement at end of season
▼	Relegated at end of season
*	Participated in promotion/relegation play-offs

=== Minor tournaments ===
Year	Round	Position	GP	W	D*	L	GF	GA
(Bulgaria) 1995 Albena Cup	Final	2nd						
(Bulgaria) 1999 Albena Cup	3rd place	4th						
(Bulgaria) 2000 Albena Cup	Final	1st						
(Bulgaria) 2002 Albena Cup	3rd place	3rd						
(Bulgaria) 2005 Albena Cup	Group stage	2nd						
(Bulgaria) 2006 Albena Cup	Group stage	3rd						
(China) 2017 Four Nations Tournament	Group stage	3rd	3	1	0	2	4	6
(Spain) 2020 Pinatar Cup	Group stage	3rd	3	1	0	2	4	4
(Turkey) 2022 Turkish Women's Cup	Group stage	1st	3	3	0	0	5	0

== Honours ==
=== Friendly ===
- Albena Cup

Champions: 2000

- Turkish Women's Cup

Champions: 2022

== See also ==
- Sport in Ukraine
  - Football in Ukraine
    - Women's football in Ukraine
- Ukraine women's national under-19 football team
- Ukraine women's national under-17 football team
- Ukraine men's national football team
