= FC Vorskla Poltava (women) =

Vorskla Poltava
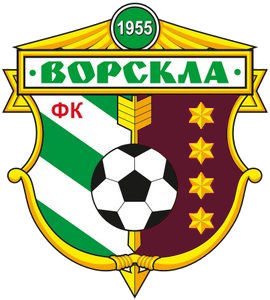
- Vorskla Logo 2010
- Full name: Football Club Vorskla Poltava
- Founded: 2007 (team); 2010 (club); 2021 (reforms)
- Chairman: (Ukraine) Dmytro Krolenko
- Coach: (Ukraine) Natalia Zinchenko
- League: Ukrainian Women's League
- 2024–25: 1st (champions)

Vorskla Poltava, formerly known as Zhytlobud-2 Kharkiv (Ukrainian: Житлобуд-2 Харків) is the Ukrainian professional women's football team associated with FC Vorskla from Poltava, Ukraine (which previously represented Kharkiv). In 2021, it became grandfathered into FC Vorskla Poltava as its women's football department. The Ukrainian Association of Football licensing center indicates that it is a separate club. The team plays in the top tier of the Ukrainian Women's League, Vyshcha Liha.

Previously, as the Kharkiv club, it used to cooperate with Kharkiv Regional College of Physical Culture and Sports, whose football team was a feeder for Zhytlobud-2 Kharkiv.

In 2026, FC Vorskla Poltava, facing a financial crisis, withdrew from all competitions, including women's.

== History ==
It all started with a girl under-13 team that was formed in 2004 and next year won the Ukrainian championship among girls that took place in Sevastopol. Later the team participated on few occasions at futsal competitions.

In 2007 the football team became known as Zhytlobud-2 Kharkiv after its main sponsor. In 2010, based on the team there was established a club which beside its female team also fields a male team in amateur competitions.

In 2010 the club also fielded its floorball team.

In 2012 the club debuted in national league competitions.

In 2017 the club took part in the first Ukrainian beach soccer competitions among women teams in Odesa. After placing second in a group stage, they were eliminated during quarterfinals.

In 2020 the club lost its founder Yuriy Krolenko who died aged 82.

Its 2022–23 UEFA Women's Champions League season the club started under the name "Vorskla-Kharkiv-2". On 10 September 2022 at the start of the domestic season, it was announced that Zhytlobud-2 has officially switched to Vorskla. At its first match against Shakhtar Donetsk, players were dressed in jerseys of Vorksla yet with Zhytlobud-2 logo.

== Honours ==
- Higher Division
  - Champions (6): 2016, 2017, 2019–20 2022–2023, 2023–24, 2024–25
  - Runners-up (4): 2014, 2017–18, 2018–19, 2020–21
- Women's Cup
  - Winners (5): 2019–20, 2020–21, 2021-22, 2022-23, 2023-24

== Current squad ==
2023

Goalkeepers	Defenders	Midfielders	Forwards
(Ukraine) Daryna Bondarchuk (Ukraine) Alla Herasymchuk	(Ukraine) Taisiia Babenko (Ukraine) Kateryna Korsun (Ukraine) Yana Kotyk (Ukraine) Mariia Kuleba (Ukraine) Iryna Podolska (Ukraine) Maryna Shaynyuk (Ukraine) Karina Voit	(Ukraine) Iryna Kotiash (Ukraine) Roksolana Kravchuk (Kazakhstan) Kamila Kulmagambetova (Ukraine) Anna Petryk (Ukraine) Viktoria Radionova	(Ukraine) Veronika Andrukhiv (Ukraine) Nikol Kozlova (Ukraine) Iryna Kushnir

== European History ==
In European competitions, the club debuted in 2017 with a game against Romanian FCU Olimpia Cluj. Their first goal was scored by Yana Malakhova in the game against Scottish Hibernian L.F.C.. They passed the qualification sieve only once, during the 2020–21 season.

Season	Competition	Stage	Result	Opponent
2017–18	UEFA Women's Champions League	Qualifying Round (Group 2)	0–1 (away)	(Romania) FCU Olimpia Cluj
2017–18	UEFA Women's Champions League	Qualifying Round (Group 2)	9–0 (neutral)	(Wales) Swansea City L.F.C.
2017–18	UEFA Women's Champions League	Qualifying Round (Group 2)	1–1 (neutral)	(Scotland) Hibernian L.F.C.
2020–21	UEFA Women's Champions League	Qualifying Round 1	9–0 (home)	(Armenia) Alashkert
2020–21	UEFA Women's Champions League	Qualifying Round 2	2–0 (away)	(Bosnia and Herzegovina) SFK 2000
2020–21	UEFA Women's Champions League	Round of 32	2–2 (a)	(Kazakhstan) BIIK Kazygurt
2022–23	UEFA Women's Champions League	Qualifying Round 1	5–0 (neutral)	(Georgia (country)) Lanchkhuti
2022–23	UEFA Women's Champions League	Qualifying Round 1	2–0 (neutral)	(Kazakhstan) BIIK Kazygurt
2022–23	UEFA Women's Champions League	Qualifying Round 2	1–1 (home)	(Albania) Vllaznia
2022–23	UEFA Women's Champions League	Qualifying Round 2	1–2 (away)	(Albania) Vllaznia
2023–24	UEFA Women's Champions League	Qualifying Round 1	4–3 (a.e.t.) (neutral)	(Estonia) Flora
2023–24	UEFA Women's Champions League	Qualifying Round 1	3–0 (neutral)	(Croatia) Osijek
2023–24	UEFA Women's Champions League	Qualifying Round 2	0–3 (away)	(Italy) Roma
2023–24	UEFA Women's Champions League	Qualifying Round 2	1–6 (home)	(Italy) Roma
2024–25	UEFA Women's Champions League	Qualifying Round 1	5–0 (neutral)	(Latvia) SFK Rīga
2024–25	UEFA Women's Champions League	Qualifying Round 1	2–0 (neutral)	(Hungary) Ferencváros
2024–25	UEFA Women's Champions League	Qualifying Round 2	0–1 (home)	(Scotland) Celtic
2024–25	UEFA Women's Champions League	Qualifying Round 2	0–2 (away)	(Scotland) Celtic
2025–26	UEFA Women's Champions League	Qualifying Round 2	5–0 (neutral)	(Georgia (country)) WFC Lanchkhuti
2025–26	UEFA Women's Champions League	Qualifying Round 2	2–0 (away)	(Lithuania) FC Gintra
2025–26	UEFA Women's Champions League	Qualifying Round 3	0–2 (home)	(Belgium) OH Leuven
2025–26	UEFA Women's Champions League	Qualifying Round 3	0–0 (away)	(Belgium) OH Leuven
–	UEFA Women's Europa Cup	Qualifying Round 2	1–1 (home)	(Denmark) Fortuna Hjørring
–	UEFA Women's Europa Cup	Qualifying Round 2	0–1 (away)	(Denmark) Fortuna Hjørring
