= List of women's association football stadiums by capacity =

The following is a list of football stadiums used by women's teams. They are ordered by their seating capacity, that is the maximum number of spectators that the stadium can accommodate in seated areas.

The list contains stadiums used solely for football, and those used for other sports as well as football. Some stadiums are only used by a team for certain high attendance matches, like local derbies or cup games.

Rank	Stadium	Capacity	City	Country	Home team(s)
1	Stade de Gerland	43,051	Lyon	France	Olympique Lyonnais big matches
2	Goodison Park	39,572	Liverpool	England	Everton Women
3	Harvard Stadium	30,323	Boston	United States	Boston Breakers
4	Providence Park	25,218	Portland	United States	Portland Thorns FC
5	Shell Energy Stadium	22,000	Houston	United States	Houston Dash
6	Meadow Lane	20,229	Nottingham	England	Notts County L.F.C.
7	Stade Sébastien Charléty	20,000	Paris	France	Paris Saint-Germain
8	Brann Stadion	17,500	Bergen	Norway	SK Brann (women)
9	Intility Stadion	16,555	Oslo	Norway	Vålerenga Fotball Damer
10	Keepmoat Stadium	15,231	Doncaster	England	Doncaster Rovers Belles L.F.C.
11	Sahlen's Stadium	13,768	Rochester	United States	Western New York Flash
12	Select Security Stadium	13,393	Widnes	England	Liverpool L.F.C.
13	Right to Dream Park	9,800	Farum	Denmark	FC Nordsjælland
14	Behrn Arena	8,550	Örebro	Sweden	KIF Örebro DFF
15	Linköping Arena	7,400	Linköping	Sweden	Linköpings FC
16	Mantinga Football Arena	6,523	Marijampolė	Lithuania	FK Sūduva (women)
17	Manchester Regional Arena	6,500	Manchester	England	Manchester City L.F.C.
17	T3 Arena	6,500	Umeå	Sweden	Umeå IK
19	Žalgiris' Home Stadium	5,067	Vilnius	Lithuania	FK Žalgiris (women)
20	Yurcak Field	5,000	Piscataway Township	United States	Sky Blue FC
21	Stade Paul-Lignon	4,500	Rodez	France	Rodez AF
21	Starfire Stadium	4,500	Tukwila	United States	Seattle Reign FC, Seattle Sounders Women
23	Maryland SoccerPlex	4,000	Germantown	United States	Washington Spirit
24	LF Arena	3,950	Piteå	Sweden	Piteå IF
25	Malmö IP	3,900	Malmö	Sweden	FC Rosengård
26	Sports Complex at Benedictine University	3,600	Lisle	United States	Chicago Red Stars
26	Stade Fred Aubert	3,600	Saint-Brieuc	France	En Avant de Guingamp
28	Durwood Stadium	3,200	Kansas City	United States	FC Kansas City
29	Savivaldybė Stadium	3,017	Šiauliai	Lithuania	FC Gintra, FA Šiauliai (women)
30	Utenis Stadium	3,000	Utena	Lithuania	Utenis Utena
30	Kėdainiai Stadium	3,000	Kėdainiai	Lithuania	FK Nevėžis (women)
32	Tyresövallen	2,700	Tyresö	Sweden	Tyresö FF
33	Gargždai Stadium	2,323	Gargždai	Lithuania	FK Banga (women)
34	Stade Lebon	1,927	Angoulême	France	ASJ Soyaux
35	Raudondvaris Stadium	1,500	Raudondvaris	Lithuania	Kauno Rajono FA
35	TransInvest Stadium	1,500	Galinė	Lithuania	FK Transinvest (women)
35	Åbyvallen	1,500	Mölndal	Sweden	Jitex BK
35	Norrvalla IP	1,500	Skellefteå	Sweden	Sunnanå SK
35	Vittsjö IP	1,500	Vittsjö	Sweden	Vittsjö GIK
40	Strandvallen	1,200	Hällevik	Sweden	Mallbackens IF
40	Valhalla IP	1,200	Gothenburg	Sweden	Kopparbergs/Göteborg FC
40	Vilans IP	1,200	Kristianstad	Sweden	Kristianstads DFF
43	Klaipėda FM Stadium	1,156	Klaipėda	Lithuania	Klaipėda FM
44	Stade Clément Ader	1,000	Muret	France	ASF Muret
44	Stade Léon Nautin	1,000	Saint-Étienne	France	AS Saint-Étienne
44	Stade Octave-Birembaut	1,000	Hénin-Beaumont	France	FCF Hénin-Beaumont
47	Stade de Bellevue	925	Yzeure	France	FF Yzeure Allier Auvergne
48	Plaine des Jeux de Gerland	700	Lyon	France	Olympique Lyonnais
48	Stade Degouve-Brabant	700	Arras	France	Arras FCF
50	Meadow Park	500	Borehamwood	England	Arsenal L.F.C.
50	Stade Georges Maquin	500	Viry-Châtillon	France	FCF Juvisy
50	Stade Jules Rimet	500	Sussargues	France	Montpellier HSC
53	Arriva Stadium	398	Crosby	England	Everton L.F.C.
54	Joniškis Stadium	360	Joniškis	Lithuania	FK Saned
55	Fabijoniškės Stadium	340	Vilnius	Lithuania	MFA Bitės
56	Stoke Gifford Stadium	300	Bristol	England	Bristol Academy W.F.C.
57	Wheatsheaf Park	300	Staines-upon-Thames	England	Chelsea L.F.C.
