= 2020 A Lyga (women) =

A Lyga (women)
- Champions: Gintra Universitetas
- Women's Champions League: Gintra Universitetas
- Matches: 30
- Biggest home win: Gintra Universitetas 19–0 Utenis Utena (October 2020)
- Biggest away win: Utenos Utenis 0–20 Gintra Universitetas (13 September 2020)
- Highest scoring: Utenos Utenis 0–20 Gintra Universitetas (13 September 2020)
- Longest unbeaten run: Gintra Universitetas (20 matches)

The 2020 A Lyga Women was the 28th season of the top-tier women's football league in Lithuania. Gintra Universitetas were the defending champions.

Gintra Universitetas won the competition for a record 19th time.

== Teams ==
Teams are listed in alphabetical order.

Team	Location
Banga	Gargždai
Gintra Universitetas	Siualai
Kauno Žalgiris	Kaunas
ŠSG-FA Šiauliai	Siualai
Utenos Utenis	Utena
Žalgiris	Vilnius

== League table ==
Pos	Team	Pld	W	D	L	GF	GA	GD	Pts	Qualification
1	Gintra Universitetas (C)	20	20	0	0	183	6	+177	60	Qualification for the Champions League first round
2	Žalgiris	20	13	1	6	75	42	+33	40	
3	Kauno Žalgiris	20	12	1	7	68	28	+40	37	
4	Banga	20	8	2	10	34	68	−34	26	
5	ŠSG-FA Šiauliai	20	2	1	17	6	113	−107	7	
6	Utenos Utenis	20	2	1	17	18	127	−109	7	

Source: Soccerway
Rules for classification: 1) Points; 2) Goal difference; 3) Number of goals scored; 4) Head-to-head points; 5) Head-to-head goal difference; 6) Head-to-head away goals scored
(C) Champions
