= 2019 A-Lyga (women) =

A Lyga (women)
- Season: 2019
- Dates: 31 March 2019 – 31 October 2019
- Matches: 28
- Goals: 86 (3.07 per match)
- Biggest home win: Gintra-Universitetas 16–0 Utenis Utena (5 May 2019)
- Highest scoring: Gintra-Universitetas 16–0 Utenis Utena (5 May 2019)
- Longest winning run: 5 matches Gintra-Universitetas
- Longest unbeaten run: 5 matches Gintra-Universitetas
- Longest winless run: 6 matches Utenos Utenis
- Longest losing run: 6 matches Utenos Utenis
- All statistics correct as of 22 May 2019.

The 2019 A-Lyga is the 27th edition of Lithuania's women's football league.

Pos	Team	Pld	W	D	L	GF	GA	GD	Pts	Qualification
1	Gintra-Universitetas	5	5	0	0	44	0	+44	15	2020–21 Champions League
2	FK Banga Gargždai	6	5	0	1	16	11	+5	15	
3	FK Kaunas	6	3	0	3	17	16	+1	9	
4	ŠSG-FA Šiauliai	5	1	0	4	8	15	−7	3	
5	Utenos Utenis	6	0	0	6	1	44	−43	0	
