= Raimonda Bložytė =

Lithuanian footballer

Raimonda Bložytė-Lukoševičienė
Personal information
- Birth name: Raimonda Bložytė
- Date of birth: 4 December 1987 (age 38)
- Place of birth: Soviet Union (now Lithuania)
- Position: Forward

Senior career*
Years	Team	Apps	(Gls)
200?–2014	Gintra Universitetas		
2015–2016	ŠSG-FA Šiauliai	3	(2)

International career^{‡}
2004–2005	Lithuania U19	6	(0)
2006–2013	Lithuania	9	(2)
- * Club domestic league appearances and goals as of 15 May 2016 ‡ National team caps and goals as of 9 April 2013

Raimonda Bložytė-Lukoševičienė (née Bložytė; born 4 December 1987) is a Lithuanian former footballer who played as a forward. She has been a member of the Lithuania women's national team.

== Honours ==
Gintra Universitetas

Winner

- A Lyga (4): 2010, 2011, 2012, 2013
