= Rzayev =

Rzayev or Rzaev (Russian: Рзаев) is an Azerbaijani masculine surname, its feminine counterpart is Rzayeva or Rzaeva. It is a patronymic derived from the given name Rza. It may refer to

- Abdulla Rzayev (born 2002), Azerbaijani footballer
- Abuzar bey Rzayev (1887–1920), Azerbaijani architect and engineer
- Aghabaji Rzayeva (1912–1975), Azerbaijani composer and musician
- Anar Rzayev (born 1938), Azerbaijani writer, dramatist and film director
- Aynur Rzayeva (born 1989), Azerbaijani boxer
- Dadash Rzayev (1935–2024), Azerbaijani general, politician and minister
- Hagigat Rzayeva (1907–1969), Azerbaijani actress and singer
- Islam Rzayev (1934–2008), Azerbaijani singer
- Janpolad Rzayev (1968–1992), Azerbaijani military officer and war hero
- Mirza Faraj Rzayev (1847–1927), Azerbaijani musician
- Munavvar Rzayeva (1929–2004), Azerbaijani sculptor
- Mushfig Rzayev (born 1998), Azerbaijani footballer
- Narmina Rzayeva (born 1992), Azerbaijani footballer
- Nazim Rzayev (1925–2006), Azerbaijani conductor and musician
- Rail Rzayev (1945–2009), Commander of the Azerbaijani Air Force
- Roida Rzayeva (born 1979), Azerbaijani philosopher
- Rovshan Rzayev (1969–1999), Azerbaijani military officer and war hero
- Rovshen Rzayev (born 1962), Azerbaijani politician and bureaucrat
- Ruslan Rzayev (born 1998), Russian footballer
- Samandar Rzayev (1945–1986), Azerbaijani actor
- Samir Rzayev (born 1980), Azerbaijani aviation executive
- Tahir Rzayev (born 1950), Azerbaijani politician
- Tural Rzayev (born 1993), Azerbaijani footballer
- Veysal Rzayev (born 2002), Azerbaijani footballer
- Vidadi Rzayev (born 1967), Azerbaijani footballer
- Zaur Rzayev (1937–2010), Azerbaijani general

== See also ==
- Rzazade, Persian equivalent of the surname
