= Irina Topal =

Moldovan footballer

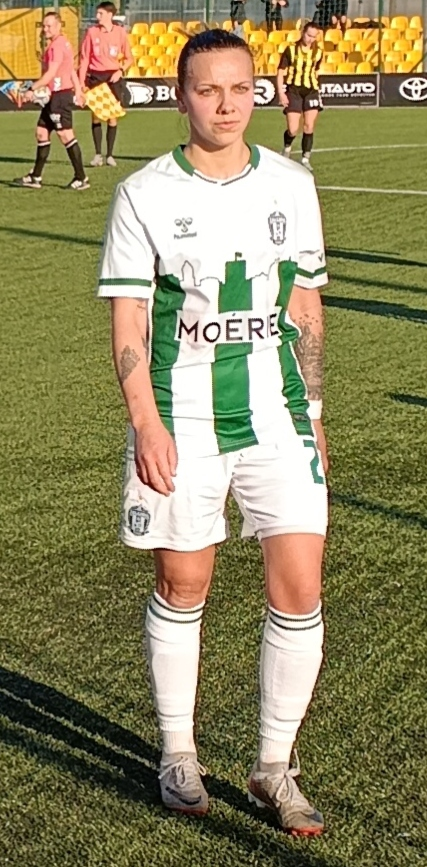
- Irina Topal after match FA Šiauliai W against FK Žalgiris W (10 May 2026)

Personal information
- Date of birth: 19 December 1998 (age 27)
- Position: Midfielder

Team information
- Current team: FK Žalgiris
- Number: 27

Senior career*
Years	Team	Apps	(Gls)
2009–2015	LTPS nr.2		
2015–2018	FC Noroc		
2018–2021	FC Universitatea Galați		
2021–2022	FC Kryvbas Kryvyi Rih		
2022	Stomilanki Olsztyn		
2022	PAE OFĪ		
2023	FK Vilnius	12	(8)
2023–2024	FC Noroc		
2024–2025	Transinvest	33	(6)
2026–	Žalgiris	6	(3)

International career^{‡}
	Moldova	33	(2)
- * Club domestic league appearances and goals as of 13 May 2026 ‡ National team caps and goals as of 31 July 2025

Irina Topal (born 19 December 1998) is a Moldovan footballer who plays as a midfielder and has appeared for the Moldova women's national team.

== Career ==
Topal has been capped for the Moldova national team, appearing for the team during the 2019 FIFA Women's World Cup qualifying cycle.

== International goals ==
No.	Date	Venue	Opponent	Score	Result	Competition
1.	15 February 2023	Camp FSCG, Podgorica, Montenegro	Montenegro	1–2	1–6	Friendly
2.	22 September 2023	CSR Orhei, Orhei, Moldova	Andorra	1–0	1–2	2023–24 UEFA Women's Nations League
