= Khrystyna Pereviznyk =

Ukrainian footballer (born 1997)

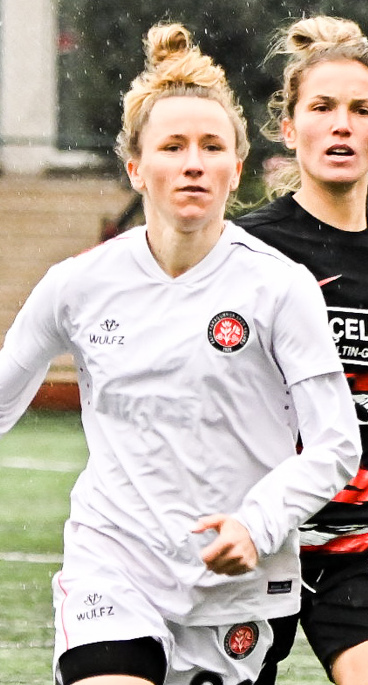

Personal information
- Full name: Khrystyna Romanivna Pereviznyk
- Date of birth: 19 July 1997 (age 29)
- Place of birth: Ukraine
- Position: Midfielder

Team information
- Current team: FC Gintra

Senior career*
Years	Team	Apps	(Gls)
2011–2013	Prykarpattia		
2013	Naftokhimik		
2014	Prykarpattia		
2014–2018	Lehenda-ShVSM		
2018–2019	Ladomyr		
2019–2020	ALG Spor		
2020–2021	Ladomyr		
2022	Vilnius		
2023	Beşiktaş		
2023–	Fatih Karagümrük		
2024–2025	Transinvest		
2025–	FC Gintra		

International career
- Ukraine
- * Club domestic league appearances and goals

Khrystyna Romanivna Pereviznyk (Ukrainian: Христина Перевізник; born 19 July 1997) is a Ukrainian footballer who plays as a midfielder for Lithuanian Gintra Club.

== Early life ==
Pereviznyk started playing football at a young age with boys.

== Club career ==
Pereviznyk was the top scorer of the 2022 Lithuanian Women's A League with twenty-two goals.

=== Gintra ===
On 14 January 2026 officially announced, that Khrystyna Pereviznyk signed with Lithuanian Gintra Club.

== International career ==
Pereviznyk has been regarded as a Ukraine prospect.

== Style of play ==
Pereviznyk mainly operates as a midfielder and has described the Turkish league as "emphasizing technical and tactical training, while in Ukraine - on physical training".

== Managerial career ==
Pereviznyk has attended coaching courses and has managed youth teams.

== Personal life ==
Pereviznyk is a supporter of English Premier League side Manchester City.
