= Gabija Toropovaitė =

Lithuanian footballer

Personal information
- Date of birth: 28 January 2002 (age 24)
- Height: 1.70 m (5 ft 7 in)
- Position: Midfielder

Team information
- Current team: ŠSG-FA Šiauliai
- Number: 9

Senior career*
| Years | Team | Apps | (Gls) |
| 2019– | ŠSG-FA Šiauliai | | |

International career^{‡}
- Lithuania
- * Club domestic league appearances and goals as of 23:49, 31 August 2019 (UTC) ‡ National team caps and goals as of 23:49, 31 August 2019 (UTC)

Gabija Toropovaitė (born 28 January 2002) is a Lithuanian footballer who plays as a midfielder and has appeared for the Lithuania women's national team for ŠSG-FA Šiauliai in the A Lyga (women).

== Career ==
Toropovaitė has been capped for the Lithuania national team, appearing for the team during the UEFA Women's Euro 2021 qualifying cycle.
