= Premier League All Stars =

- Presented by: Ian Wright, Helen Chamberlain.
- Country of origin: United Kingdom
- No. of series: 1
- No. of episodes: 8

Production
- Running time: 120 minutes (episodes 1-7) 180 minutes (episode 8)

Original release
- Network: Sky1
- Release: 23 September – 30 September 2007

Premier League All Stars is a televised charity football tournament, which was broadcast live on Sky1 on consecutive nights between 23 September and 30 September 2007. The format featured football teams representing all 20 Premier League clubs, each playing to win a share of the £300,000 prize money for distribution among their chosen charities. All matches were played in front of a live audience at Premier League All Star Arena which was built inside the David Beckham Academy in Greenwich, London.

== Overview ==
The show was presented by Helen Chamberlain and Ian Wright, with pitchside reporting by former Liverpool and Australia forward Craig Johnston. Suzi Perry also presented in Helen Chamberlain's absence. An accompanying show, Premier League All Stars Extra Time, aired straight after the show on Sky3, hosted by Jason Manford.

Each 10-man squad consisted of 4 professional players (legends), 3 celebrity supporters and 3 ordinary fans picked from a large number of applicants.

The competition was won by underdogs Middlesbrough with celebrity Alistair Griffin scoring the winning goal in the last minute. The team was presented with the All Stars 2007 trophy together with £100,000 prize money for their two nominated charities, the Butterwick Children's Hospice and Teesside Hospice.

Runners up West Ham United won £30,000 for the Bobby Moore Fund and Richard House Hospice.

== The teams ==
=== Arsenal ===
Goalkeeper - Vince Bartram
Legend - Paul Davis,
Celebrities - Ziggy Lichman, Mark Ramprakash, Leeroy Thornhill
Fans - Tommy McNally (Banker), Vernon Angel (Social Worker), Stelios Ekkeshis (Captain and PE Teacher)
(Charity - Arsenal Charitable Trust For Treehouse)

=== Aston Villa ===
Goalkeeper - Dale Belford
Legends - Dean Saunders, David Platt (Captain), Ian Taylor
Celebrities - Gareth Gates, Lord Taylor of Warwick, Rick Parfitt Jr
Fans - Mark Quinn (IT Consultant), Ian Wilkinson (Postman), Paul Quinn (Computer Science student and son of other fan Mark Quinn)
(Charity - Acorns Children's Hospice)

=== Birmingham City ===
Goalkeeper - Kevin Miller
Legends - Paul Devlin (only played in group game), Steve Claridge (Captain), Martin Grainger, Dennis Bailey (only played in quarter-final)
Celebrities - Dennis Seaton, Robert McCracken, Nigel Clark
Fans - Stuart Kane (Warehouse Logistics Manager), Caius Kane (Tool Manufacturer), Perry Hemmings (Trainee Welder)
(Charity - Promise Dreams and Book Trust)

=== Blackburn Rovers ===
Goalkeeper - Alan Fettis
Legends - Simon Garner (captain), Matt Jansen, Craig Short
Celebrities - Neil Arthur, Wayne Hemingway, Steven Pinder
Fans - Jack Hemingway (Son of celebrity Wayne and Graphic Designer), Anthony Watson (Engineering Production Manager), David Butterworth (Sports Co-ordinator)

=== Bolton Wanderers ===
Goalkeeper - Carl Blundell (fan)
Legends - Frank Worthington (Captain), Andy Walker, Michael Johansen
Celebrities - Sheephead, Ian Aspinall, Sajid Mahmood, Tony Knowles
Fans - Nathan Cooper, Alan Mitchell, Alex Harvie

=== Chelsea ===
Goalkeeper - Peter Bonetti
Legends - Ruud Gullit (only played in group game), Roberto Di Matteo, Kerry Dixon, Gustavo Poyet (only played in quarter-final)
Celebrities - Ross Kemp, Omid Djalili, Alec Stewart
Fans - Gary Field (Insurance Broker) Judan Ali (football coach/ex Arsenal youth player)
(Charities - Clic Sargent & Right To Play)

=== Derby County ===
Goalkeeper - Steve Cherry
Legends - Dean Sturridge, Darryl Powell, Darren Wassall (Captain)
Celebrities - Dominic Cork, Des Coleman, Jamie Baulch
Fans - Andy Wheeler (Financial Advisor), Chad Potter (Media Advertising Agent), Andy Mason (Recruitment Sales Consultant)
(Charity - Access To High Quality Activities For All)

=== Everton ===
Goalkeeper - Tim Howard
Legends - Dave Watson, Adrian Heath
Celebrities - Donny Tourette, Simon O'Brien, Lee Latchford Evans, Graham Rooney
Fans - Peter McPartland, David Lyon, Vinny Hughes, Simon Marshall

=== Fulham ===
Goalkeeper - Dave Beasant
Legends - Wayne Collins, Rufus Brevett, Bjarne Goldbaek
Celebrities - Example, Andy Scott-Lee, Jim Jefferies
Fans - Kevin Taylor (Double Glazing Company Owner), Adam Di Mambro (Captain and Shoe Designer)
(Charity - Community Disability Programme)

=== Liverpool ===
Goalkeeper - Bob Bolder
Legends - Phil Neal (Captain), Jason McAteer, Ray Houghton
Celebrities - Colin Murray, Euan Blair, Dave Gorman
Fans - Nick Haycraft (Motor Sales Advisor), Graeme Inman (Football Coach), Paul Smith (Property Development Manager)
(Charity - Anthony Walker Foundation)

=== Manchester City ===
Goalkeeper - Andy Dibble
Legends - Rodney Marsh, Nicky Summerbee, Fitzroy Simpson, Keith Curle
Celebrities - Ant Genn, Nigel Bond, Jason Manford, Nick Leeson
Fans - Tom Beddard (College Tutor), Rory McDowell (Window Fitter), Lee Jones (Roofer)
(Charity - Disability Football Club)

=== Manchester United ===
Goalkeeper - Fraser Digby
Legends - Lee Sharpe, Ray Wilkins (Captain, only played in group game), Clayton Blackmore, Arthur Albiston (Quarter-final onwards)
Celebrities - Angus Deayton, Mark Chapman, Darren Campbell (Captain in quarter-final)
Fans - Matt Fisher (Housing Officer), Dave Rimmer (Police Officer), Phil Ringer (Fishing Bait Manufacturer)
(Charity - Social Education In Secondary Schools)

=== Middlesbrough ===
Goalkeeper - Jim Platt (Captain)
Legends - Mikkel Beck, Craig Hignett, Bernie Slaven
Celebrities - Alistair Griffin, Mark Stobbart, Gary Havelock
Fans - Julian McGuire (IT Consultant), Tony Rovardi (Ice Cream Cone Manufacturer), Steven Aithwaite (Sports and Science Lecturer)
(Charities - Butterwick Children's Hospice & Teesside Hospice)

=== Newcastle United ===
Goalkeeper - Kevin Carr
Legends - Rob Lee, Warren Barton, John Beresford
Celebrities - Anthony Hutton, Simon Donald, Jonathan Edwards
Fans - Doug Grant (Stearing Systems Production Planner), Rob Hedley (Captain and Occupation Health Manager), Dean Russo (Flying Fitter
(Charity - St Oswald's Hospice)

=== Portsmouth ===
Goalkeeper - Alan Knight
Legends - Paul Walsh, Guy Whittingham (Captain), Andy Awford
Celebrities - John Portsmouth Football Club Westwood, Marcus Patrick, Adger Brown
Fans - Paul Dorey, Dan Shaw, Josh Norton
(Charity - Making Dreams Come True)

=== Reading ===
Goalkeeper - Scott Howie
Legends - Michael Gilkes, Mick Gooding, Barry Hunter
Celebrities - Mark Rumble, Michael Sprott, James Fox
Fans - Mark Croydon (Betting Shop Manager), Darren Webb (Audio Sales Manager), Ben Fisher (Captain and Transport Administrator)
(Charity - Reading Respect Project)

=== Sunderland ===
Goalkeeper - Iain Hesford
Legends - Marco Gabbiadini (Captain for group game), Steve Watson, Don Goodman (only played in group game), John Byrne (Quarter-final onwards)
Celebrities - Liam McGough, Joe Simpson (group game and quarter-final only), John Nayagam, Rocky Marshall (only played in semi-final)
Fans - Paul Hewitson (Captain for quarter-final and Youth Worker), Mick Hall (Captain for semi-final Air Bag Manufacturer), Craig Hubbard (Fitness Instructor)
(Charity - Family Learning Project)

=== Tottenham Hotspur ===
Goalkeeper - Espen Baardsen
Legends - Nayim, David Howells (Captain), Micky Hazard
Celebrities - Phil Cornwell, John Altman, John Pickard
Fans - Tony Sutton (Car Supermarket Manager), Lee Barr (Fish Salesman), James Duckworth (Ceramic Tiler)
(Aiming for 50,000 sporting opportunities)

=== West Ham United ===
Goalkeeper - Allen McKnight
Legends - Tony Cottee (Captain), Frank McAvennie (Missed quarter-final), John Moncur, Kevin Keen (Only played in quarter-final)
Celebrities - Danny Dyer (group game and quarter-final only), Tamer Hassan (Suspended for semi-final), Geoff Bell, Roland Manookian (Semi-final onwards)
Fans - Julian Hilaire (Civil Servant), Matthew Crook (Publishing Account Manager), Chris Whitelock (Sports Management Student)
(Charities - Bobby Moore Fund & Richard House Hospice)

=== Wigan Athletic ===
Goalkeeper - Simon Farnworth
Legends - David Lowe, Stuart Barlow, Colin Greenall
Celebrities - Martin Offiah (Captain), Jez Edwards, Paul Tonkinson
Fans - Paul Knowles (Recruitment Consultant), Dean Gore (Telesales operator), Darren Cole (hands on group Car Wash Franchise Manager)
(Charity - Derian House Children's Hospice)

== Competition format ==
The games are played indoors in a custom-built futuristic arena and are based on standard FA seven-a-side rules, but with a handful of innovations. The key rules: Matches are ten minutes each way (fifteen each way in the final). Play starts with 'The Drop', where the ball is dropped from a chute in the ceiling 10m above the centre spot. The last minute of each half is deemed a 'PowerPlay', any goals scored during that time count double. Players guilty of persistent foul play are shown a blue rather than yellow card and spend two minutes in 'The Cooler' (a sin bin).

The competition is a knock-out format. However, due to the number of teams involved (20), two of the winning ten teams in the first round are also eliminated as 'Worst Winners' so that only eight teams remain to contest the quarter-finals and beyond. This means that it is not enough simply to win the first-round game - to avoid elimination, teams also have to win well, which is designed to encourage attacking play and scoring more goals.

== The Games ==
The matches are refereed by Dermot Gallagher. Other officials included Steve Dunn as time-keeper, with Peter Cruise and Peter Gill as bench officials. Commentary is provided by Andy Burton and Steve Claridge, though Rodney Marsh and Tony Cottee have been co-commentators when Claridge played for the Birmingham team.

=== Day 1 (23/9/07) ===
Group 1: Manchester United 3 Blackburn Rovers 1
Group 1: Manchester City 3 Everton 0

=== Day 2 (24/9/07) ===
Group 1: West Ham United 4 Reading 0
Group 1: Wigan Athletic 5 Tottenham Hotspur 2 Goals scored by Jez Edwards, Paul Knowles x 2, and Dean Gore (PowerPlay Goal which counts as double)

=== Day 3 (25/9/07) ===
Group 1: Liverpool 3 Derby County 3 (No penalties were played as a draw was not enough and so both teams were eliminated)
Group 2: Chelsea 5 Bolton Wanderers 2

=== Day 4 (26/9/07) ===
Group 2: Sunderland 6 Aston Villa 3
Group 2: Middlesbrough 3 Newcastle United 3 (Middlesbrough won 4-3 on penalties)

=== Day 5 (27/9/07) ===
Group 2: Birmingham City 3 Portsmouth 1
Group 2: Arsenal 1 Fulham 1 (No penalties were played as a draw eliminated both teams)

Manchester United, Manchester City, West Ham United and Wigan Athletic progressed as the best four winners from group 1.
Chelsea, Sunderland, Middlesbrough And Birmingham City progressed as the best four winners from group 2.

=== Day 6 (28/9/07) ===
Quarter-final: Manchester United 0 Manchester City 0 (Manchester United won 4-3 on penalties)
Quarter-final: West Ham United 5 Wigan Athletic 2

=== Day 7 (29/9/07) ===
Quarter-final: Middlesbrough 2 Birmingham City 0
Quarter-final: Chelsea 0 Sunderland 2

=== Day 8 (30/9/07) ===
Semi-final: Middlesbrough 2 Sunderland 0
Semi-final: Manchester United 2 West Ham United 3

Premier League All Stars Final: Middlesbrough 3 West Ham United 1
