= FC Hegelmann (women) =

Lithuanian football club

Hegelmann
- Full name: Futbolo klubas Hegelmann
- Founded: January 2009; 17 years ago
- Ground: Raudondvaris Stadium
- Capacity: 1,550
- Coordinates: 54°54′15″N 23°55′49″E
- Chairman: Dainius Šumauskas
- Manager: Karolis Jasaitis
- League: Moterų A Lyga
- 2025: A Lyga, 4th of 10
- Website: https://fchegelmann.com/
Home colours	Away colours

Futbolo klubas Hegelmann, commonly known as Hegelmann, is a Lithuanian women's football team based in Raudondvaris in Kaunas district. They play in the Moterų A Lyga (lt. moterų A lyga), the first tier of Lithuanian football.

== History ==
In early 2022 was founded the women's team of football club FC Hegelmann. From 2022 season played in Moterų A Lyga. In 2023 was third in championship.

== Honours ==
(Lithuania) Moterų A Lyga

- Third place (1): 2023

== Recent seasons ==
Season	Level	Division	Position	Web
2022	1.	Moterų A Lyga	4.	
2023	1.	Moterų A Lyga	3.	
2024	1.	Moterų A Lyga	4.	
2025	1.	Moterų A Lyga	4.	

== Current squad ==
As of 6 September 2025

Note: Flags indicate national team as defined under FIFA eligibility rules; some limited exceptions apply. Players may hold more than one non-FIFA nationality.

No.	Pos.	Nation	Player
1	GK	LTU	Martyna Sventickaitė
2	MF	LTU	Danielė Svirnelytė
4	FW	LTU	Agnė Žėglevičiūtė
5	DF	LTU	Rugilė Misiukevičiūtė
9	DF	LTU	Justina Baltrūnaitė
10	DF	LTU	Vanesa Vasiliauskaitė
11	GK	LTU	Klaudija Savickaitė
12	GK	LTU	Ema Daujotė
13	DF	LTU	Vestina Neverdauskaitė

No.	Pos.	Nation	Player
14	DF	LTU	Milda Liužinaitė (captain)
17	MF	LTU	Karolina Zabolotnaja
18	MF	LTU	Ema Kriaučiūnaitė
20	MF	VEN	Grecia Inmaculada Lavieri Torres
23	MF	LTU	Simona Petravičienė (Veličkaitė)
24	MF	LTU	Julija Žvaliauskaitė
25	MF	LTU	Paulina Morkulytė
39	MF	LTU	Rusnė Makarevičiūtė
55	FW	LTU	Paulina Potapova

== Stadium ==
Club played their home matches in NFA Stadium. The current capacity of the stadium is 500 seats.

On 22 September 2024 club made debut in new home ground Raudondvaris Stadium (Raudondvario stadionas) in Raudondvaris (Kaunas district).

== Managers ==
- (Lithuania) Klaudija Savickaitė (2022);
- (Lithuania) Tomas Miliauskas (February 2023);
- (England) Judan Ali (August 2023);
- (Lithuania) Karolis Jasaitis (May 2024–)

== Notable players ==
Players who have either appeared in at least one match for their respective national teams at any time or received an individual award while at the club. Players whose names are listed in bold represented their countries while playing for FC Hegelmann.

Lithuania

- **Milda Liužinaitė**
- **Vestina Neverdauskaitė**
- **Ema Kriaučiūnaitė**
- **Klaudija Savickaitė**
- **Paulina Potapova**
- **Austė Bernotaitė**
- Karolina Zabolotnaja
- Simona Veličkaitė (Simona Petravičienė)
