= MFA Žalgiris-MRU =

Lithuanian football club

MFA-MRU Žalgiris
- Full name: Moterų futbolo akademija "Žalgiris"– Mykolo Romerio universitetas
- Nickname: Žaliai Balti (The Green Whites)
- Founded: 2013; 13 years ago
- Ground: LEU Stadium
- Capacity: 1,000
- Coordinates: 54°40′07″N 25°17′39″E
- Chairman: Svajūnas Stravinskas
- Head coach: Vadim Carabetchi
- League: Moterų A Lyga
- 2025: A Lyga, 3rd of 10
- Website: www.mfazalgiris.lt
Home colours	Away colours

MFA Žalgiris-MRU is a Lithuanian women's football team based in Vilnius. They play in the Moterų A Lyga (lt. moterų A lyga), the first tier of Lithuanian football.

== History ==
MFA Žalgiris was founded in 2013 as Women`s Football Academy. In early 2013 was founded the women's team. From 2013 season played in Moterų A Lyga.

From 2022 started play in LMFA I Lyga. Since 2025 played in Moterų A Lyga.

== Achievements ==
(Lithuania) Moterų A Lyga

- Runners-up (5): 2020, 2021, 2022, 2023, 2024
- Third place (4): 2013, 2014, 2015, 2017, 2025

== Recent seasons ==
Season	Level	League	Place	Web	Notes
2013	1.	Moterų A Lyga	3.		
2014	1.	Moterų A Lyga	3.		
2015	1.	Moterų A Lyga	3.		
2016	1.	Moterų A Lyga	4.		
2017	1.	Moterų A Lyga	3.		
2018	1.	Moterų A Lyga	5.		relegated
2019	2.	LMFA I Lyga	1.		Promotion
2020	1.	Moterų A Lyga	2.		
2021	1.	Moterų A Lyga	2.		
2022	1.	Moterų A Lyga	2.		
2023	1.	Moterų A Lyga	2.		
2024	1.	Moterų A Lyga	2.		
2025	1.	Moterų A Lyga	3.		

== Kit evolution ==
2024 season Home	2024 season Away	2024 season Goalkeeper

Kit manufacturer – Nike.

== Current squad ==
As of 25 April, 2026

Note: Flags indicate national team as defined under FIFA eligibility rules; some limited exceptions apply. Players may hold more than one non-FIFA nationality.

No.	Pos.	Nation	Player
1	GK	LTU	Erneta Rinkevičiūtė
12	GK	LTU	Ieva Kaminskaitė
48	GK	LTU	Darija Mikuckytė
3	DF	LTU	Vismantė Čereškaitė
20	DF	LTU	Emilija Stefanovič
24	DF	NGA	Joy Ndidi Duru
25	DF	LTU	Judita Traubaitė
27	DF	LTU	Kotryna Maželytė
30	DF	LTU	Greta Markauskaitė
90	DF	LTU	Augustė Andrijevskytė
10	MF	LTU	Ugnė Slankauskaitė

No.	Pos.	Nation	Player
15	MF	LTU	Adrija Skudutytė
23	MF	USA	Francesca Frericks
26	MF	LTU	Santa Lichareva
32	MF	LTU	Dorotėja Aidukaitė
75	MF	LTU	Austėja Petkevičiūtė
77	MF	LTU	Neda Klezaitė
78	MF	LTU	Emilija Gerasimova
?	FW	LTU	Erika Šupelytė
12	FW	LTU	Ineta Šukštulytė

== Managers ==
- (Lithuania) Linas Virketis, 2013
- (Lithuania) Vytautas Jančiauskas
- (Lithuania) Vaidas Sabaliauskas
- (Lithuania) Domas Paulauskas
- (Lithuania) Tomas Ražanauskas, 2017–2018
- (Lithuania) Svajūnas Savickas, 2018–2019
- (Lithuania) Karolis Jasaitis, 2019–2022
- (Ukraine) Bohdan Lukašenka, 2023–2024
- (Moldova) Vadim Carabetchi, 2025–

== Notable players ==
Players who have either appeared in at least one match for their respective national teams at any time or received an individual award while at the club. Players whose names are listed in bold represented their countries while playing for MFA Žalgiris-MRU.

Lithuania

- (Lithuania) **Meda Šeškutė**
- (Lithuania) **Anika Kyžaitė**
- (Lithuania) **Laura Ruzgutė**
- (Lithuania) **Judita Traubaitė**
- (Lithuania) **Ugnė Lazdauskaitė**

Others

- (Turkmenistan) **Maýa Musaskaýa**
- (Uganda) Otandeka Laki
- (Armenia) **Anna Dallakyan**
- (Armenia) **Liana Ghazaryan**
- (Moldova) **Iuliana Colnic**
- (Lithuania) **Anastasia Sivolobova**
- (South Sudan) Debora Luka
- (Haiti) Paola Simone Nicole Ellis
- (Ukraine) **Polina Yanchuk**

== See also ==
- FK Žalgiris (women)
- FK Kauno Žalgiris
- FK Kauno Žalgiris (futsal)
