= Ņina Maksimova =

Latvian footballer

Personal information
- Date of birth: 23 June 1986 (age 40)
- Position: Goalkeeper

Senior career*
Years	Team	Apps	(Gls)
- Gintra Universitetas
- Skonto / Cerība

International career^{‡}
2004	Latvia U19	3	(0)
2006–2011	Latvia	4	(0)
- * Club domestic league appearances and goals ‡ National team caps and goals as of 19 July 2023

Ņina Maksimova (born 23 June 1986) is a former Latvian footballer who played as a goalkeeper. She has been a member of the Latvia women's national team.
