= Church of St. Michael the Archangel, Gargždai =

Roman Catholic church in Gargždai, Lithuania built in 1990

Church of St. Michael the Archangel Šv. arkangelo Mykolo bažnyčia
- Façade of the church in 2020

Religion
- Affiliation: Roman Catholic
- Leadership: Roman Catholic Diocese of Telšiai
- Year consecrated: 1990

Location
- Location: Gargždai, Lithuania
- Interactive map of Church of St. Michael the Archangel; Šv. arkangelo Mykolo bažnyčia
- Coordinates: 55°42′38.88″N 21°24′7.56″E

Architecture
- Architect: Vladas Lučinskas
- Type: Church
- Style: Postmodernism
- Completed: 1990

Specifications
- Height (max): 22 meters
- Spire height: 53 meters

The Church of St. Michael the Archangel (Lithuanian: Šv. arkangelo Mykolo bažnyčia) is a Roman Catholic church in Gargždai, Lithuania. The church was constructed in 1989–1990 on the site of the former church, which was burned down during World War II in 1941, however a belfry constructed in the 19th century and a Classical style chapel remained from the period of the old church.

The tower clock was donated to the church by the Lithuanian Australians. In 2016, a statute of Saint Michael the Archangel created by the Lithuanian sculptor Algirdas Bosas was added to the façade of the church. In 2020, exterior lighting was installed in order to illuminate the church at night. In 2022, new bells with the coat of arms of Gargždai were installed at the church.

== Gallery ==
Apse of the church

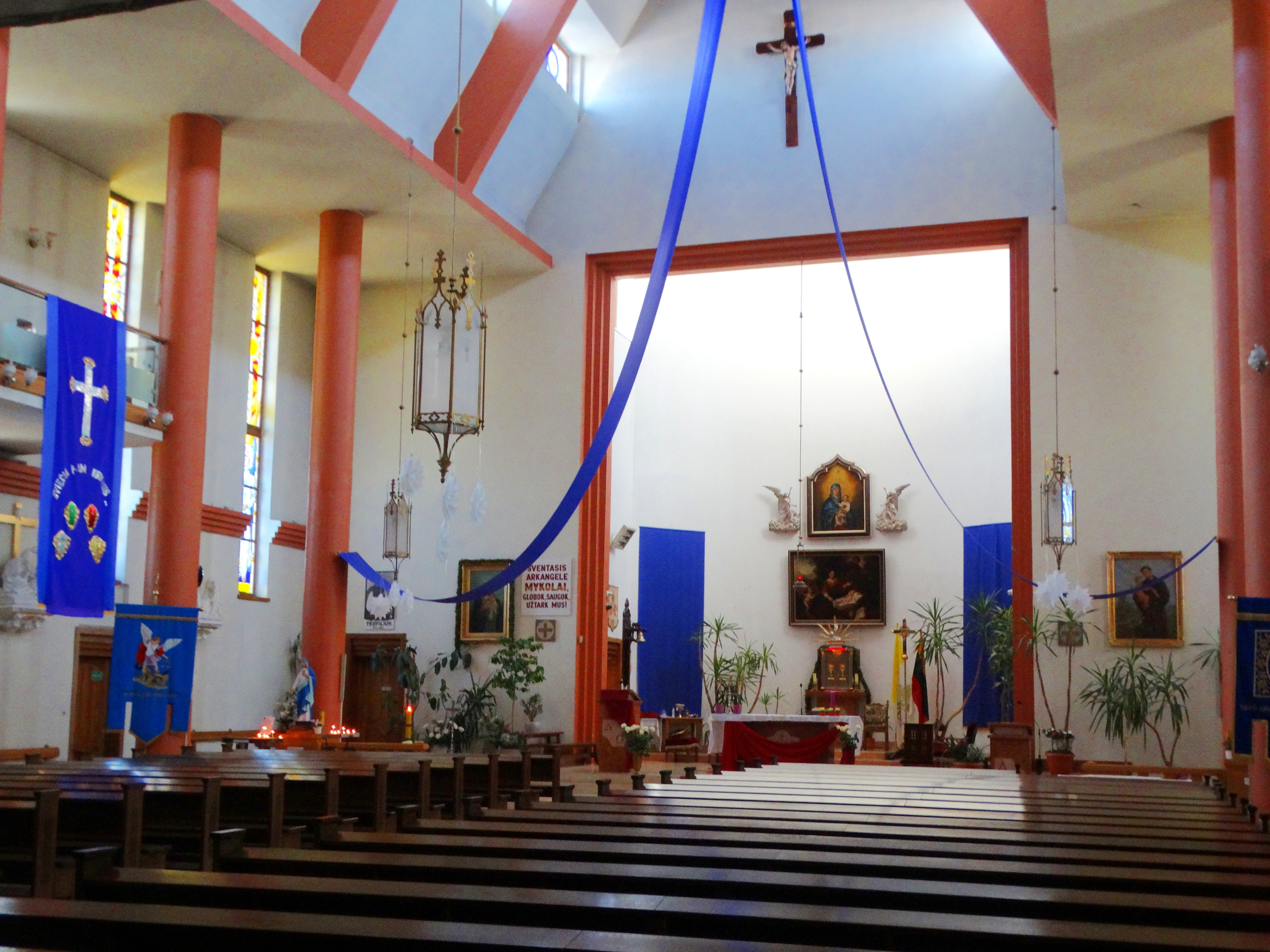
Main altar

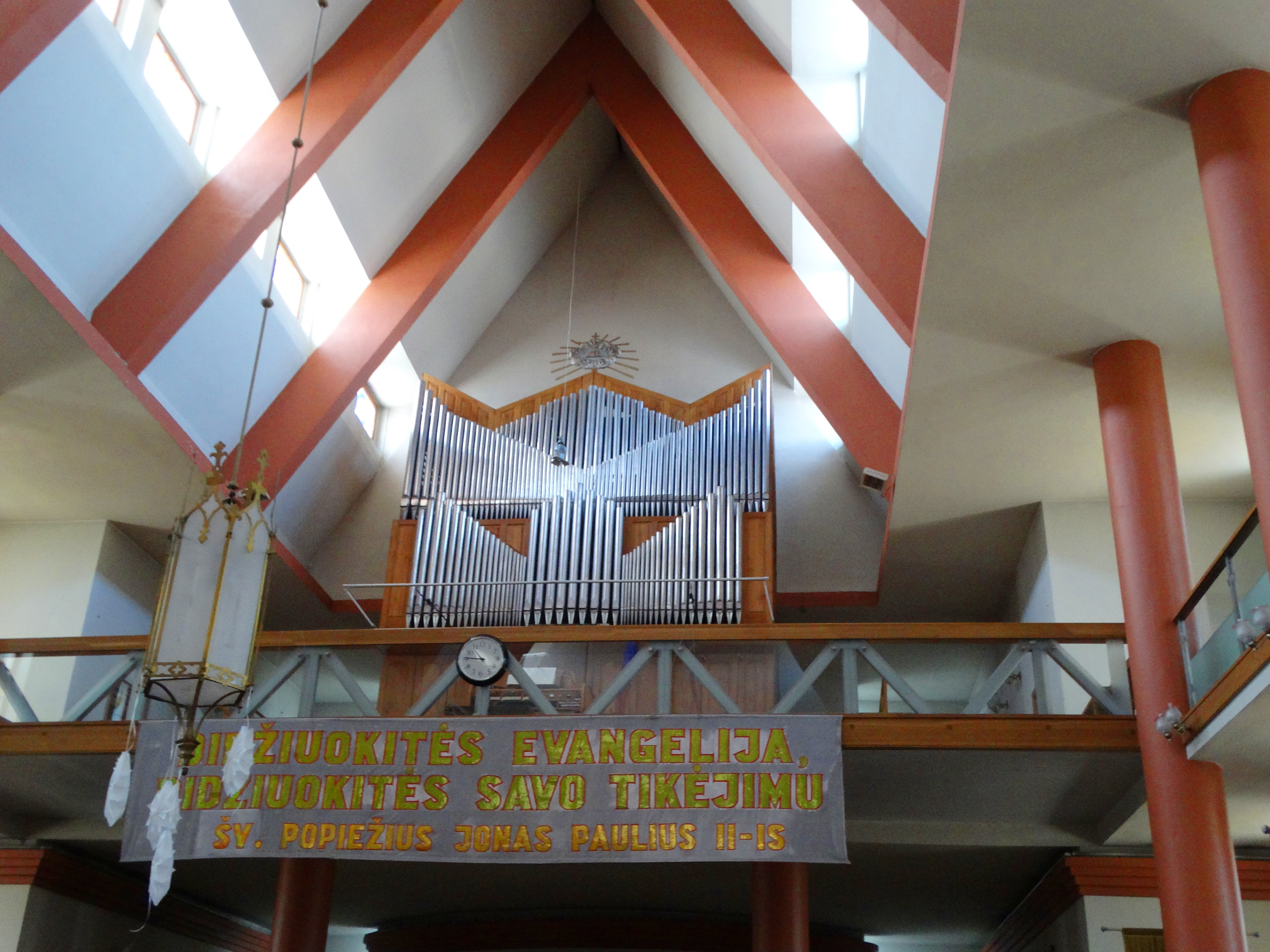
Organ

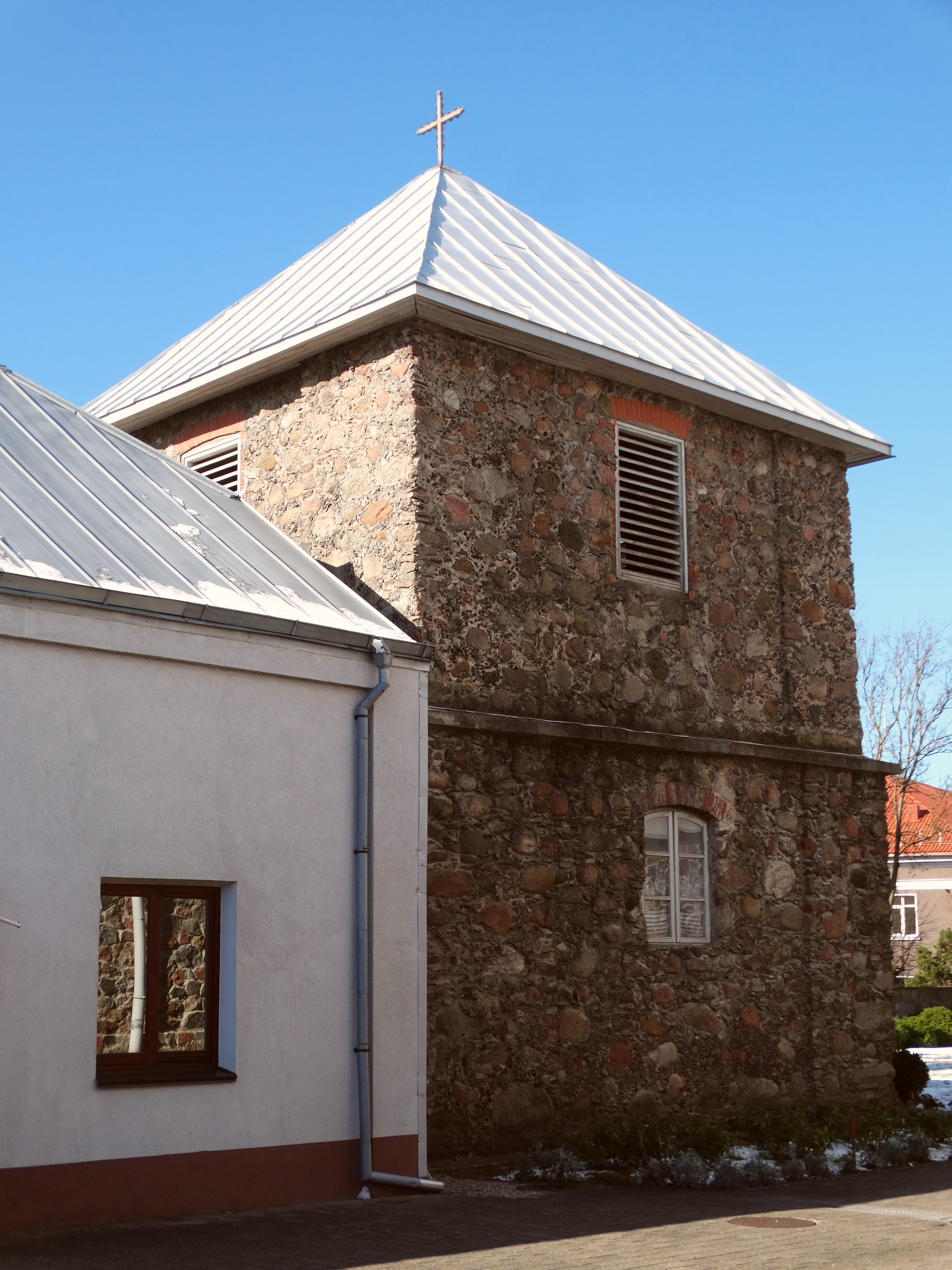
The old belfry, dating to the 19th century

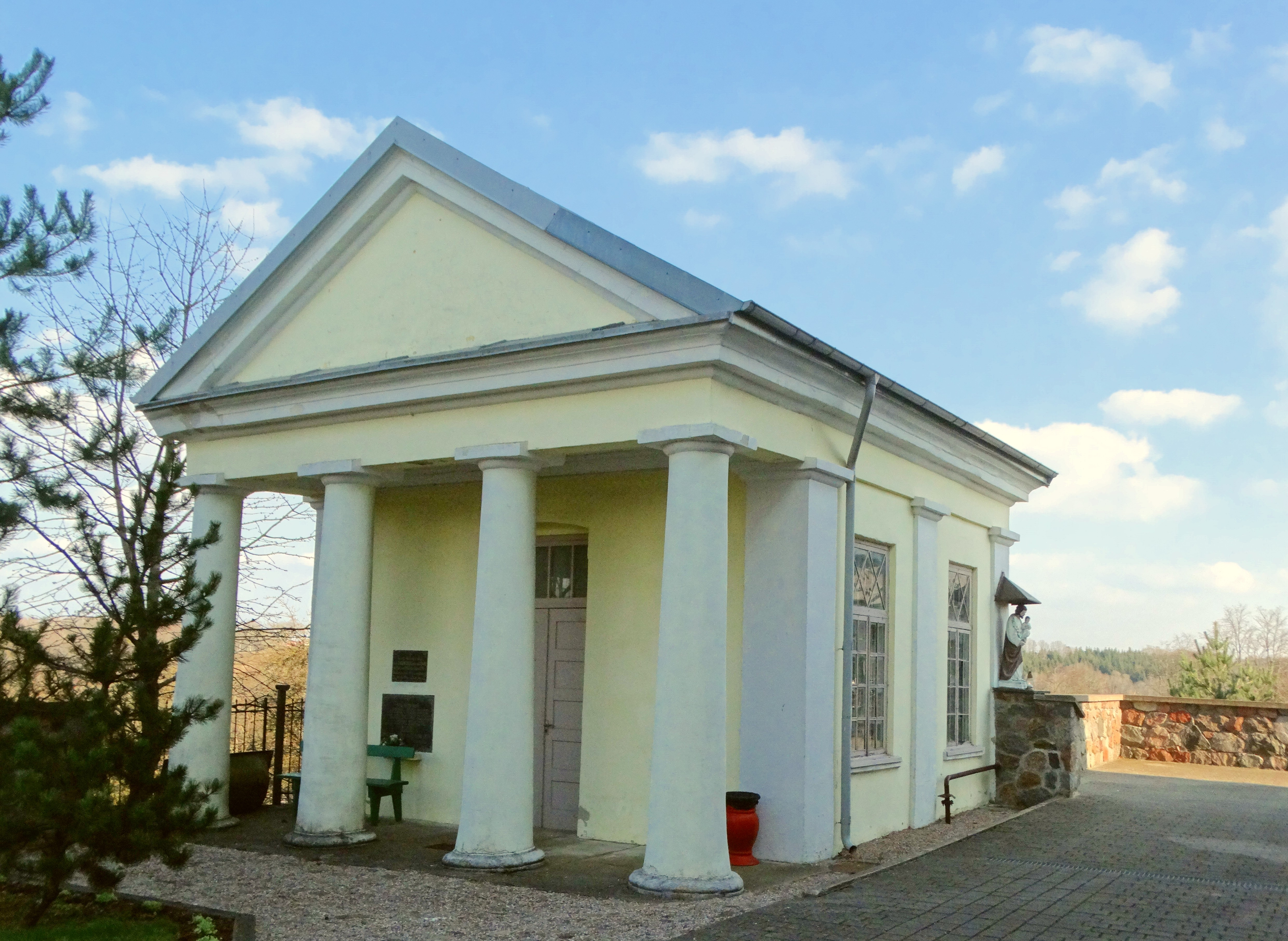
Gargždai Churchyard Chapel, dating to the 19th century
