= 2010 A-Lyga (women) =

The 2010 A-Lyga was the 18th edition of Lithuania's women's football league. It was won for the 6th year in a row by Gintra-Universitetas Siauliai, which won all 12 games.

Pos	Team	Pld	W	D	L	GF	GA	GD	Pts	Qualification
1	Gintra-Universitetas	12	12	0	0	112	3	+109	36	2011–12 Champions League
2	TexTiliTe Ukmergė	12	9	1	2	32	20	+12	28	
3	FK Akmenė	12	7	1	4	30	22	+8	22	
4	FK Kaunas	12	4	0	8	18	43	−25	12	
5	Rūta-Vilnius FM	12	3	1	8	12	30	−18	10	
6	Žalgiris	12	3	1	8	5	35	−30	10	
7	Tauras Tauragė	12	1	2	9	8	64	−56	5	
