= John Portsmouth Football Club Westwood =

English football supporter (born 1963)

John Anthony Portsmouth Football Club Westwood
- Born: John Anthony Westwood; 14 April 1963 (age 63); Liss, England
- Occupation: Antiquarian bookseller
- Years active: 1976–present
- Known for: Fan of Portsmouth Football Club

John Anthony Portsmouth Football Club Westwood (born 1963) is a notable football fan and supporter of Portsmouth (known as Pompey); his occupation is an antiquarian bookseller. He has featured in books, magazines, on TV and radio, and the National Portrait Gallery, London.

Westwood's appearance has many Pompey-related features, some temporary and some permanent. Westwood has a mixed reception among Portsmouth fans and has served bans for bad behaviour.

== Background ==
Born in Liss, Hampshire, Westwood started attending Pompey matches in 1976 and has not missed a home match since 1980. As his commitment grew to the club, so too did his range of Portsmouth FC themed accessories. In 1989 he changed his name, by deed poll, from John Anthony Westwood to John Anthony Portsmouth Football Club Westwood and he is the most recognisable Portsmouth supporter.

== Appearance ==
Westwood has sixty Pompey-related tattoos, the club crest shaved onto his head and "PFC" engraved on his teeth. He can be clearly heard ringing his handbell, to represent the "Pompey Chimes", almost continuously throughout Portsmouth matches. He wears a large stove pipe hat, a blue and white dreadlock wig, an LED sign showing Play Up Pompey, a badge that says Danger Stupid Person, and also uses a bugle.

== Charity and publicity ==
In 2003 Westwood was featured in the BBC Television Social anthropology project Video Nation.

A photo reportage entitled Fan de foot. So British! by Paris-based photographer Andrew McLeish about men, passion and football, focussing on Westwood, won the French magazine Paris Match's 2004 "Prix du Public" competition for photography students.

In September 2007 he played in the Premier League All Stars on Sky Sports, playing as a celebrity fan for Portsmouth.

He featured on the cover of Chuck Culpepper's 2007 book, Up Pompey, an American's take on English football fans.

Westwood had an informal interview with Nigel Farage on GB News in 2022.

=== National Portrait Gallery ===
In 2008 a portrait of Westwood by artist Karl Rudziak won the Portsmouth Open Art Competition. In February 2009 it was accepted for the BP Portrait Awards exhibition at the National Portrait Gallery in London, where it was on display from June until September. On 28 September 2009 the exhibition began a national tour, starting at the Southampton City Art Gallery. Not surprisingly, the Southampton FC supporters did not give the display a warm welcome. Rudziak commented that during the sittings for the portrait, he began to understand that Westwood's tattoos and costume were not simply an attention seeking display but a way of externalising his deep passion for Portsmouth F.C. and reflecting his inner self.

== Behaviour ==
Westwood was banned from South Coast arch-rivals Southampton's St Mary's Stadium for urinating on seats in the away end and being thrown out of a derby match in 2003 for persistently refusing to sit down when ordered to by stewards. However, he was in the crowd on 13 February 2010, when Portsmouth defeated Southampton 4–1 in the fifth round of the FA Cup, and at the 2–2 draw in the Championship on 7 April 2012.

He served a two match ban for urinating against a wall outside Forest Green Rovers' The New Lawn stadium. It was his second match ban of 2022; the first was a three match ban for making lewd gestures towards away fans against Coventry City. Westwood, a season ticket holder, accepted the ban and said he had let the club down; he was told of his punishment by phone. He was banned again from Pompey's draw against Oxford United in mid-week and also missed the home game vs Shrewsbury Town.

== Personal life ==
Since his father Frank's death in January 2006 Westwood has been a partner in the family bookshop in Petersfield, Hampshire.

"It's a bit Jekyll and Hyde. When I go to a local book fair, I cover up my tattoos and put on a suit. But more often than not, I end up talking to the book dealers about Pompey and it turns out they've got more tattoos than I have."

— Westwood talking about his job, tattoos and supporting Portsmouth

In 2007 Westwood wrote a book, The True Pompey Fan's Miscellany.

In January 2020, the Petersfield Bookshop was featured on many news outlets after it tweeted that it had had no customers that day. Author Neil Gaiman re-tweeted the post to his 2.3 million followers and the bookshop received thousands of pounds' worth of orders.

== Bibliography ==
- The True Pompey Fan's Miscellany, Pennant Books (2007), ISBN 0955039487
