= FK Transinvest (women) =

FK TransINVEST
- Full name: Futbolo Klubas TransINVEST
- Founded: December 2021; 4 years ago
- Ground: FK Transinvest stadionas, Galinė
- Capacity: 1 500
- Chairman: Algimantas Karavajevas
- Coach: vacant
- League: Moterų A Lyga
- 2025: Moterų A Lyga 2nd of 6
Home colours	Away colours

Futbolo Klubas TransINVEST is a Lithuanian women's football team based in Galinė. They play in the Moterų A Lyga (lt. moterų A lyga), the first tier of Lithuanian football.

== History ==
FK TransINVEST was founded in 2021. In early 2024 was founded the women's team of football club FK Transinvest. From 2024 season played in Moterų A Lyga. In 2024 was third in championship. In 2025 became a vice-champions.

== Achievements ==
(Lithuania) Moterų A Lyga

- Runners-up (1): 2025
- Third place (1): 2024

== Recent seasons ==
Season	Level	League	Place	Web	Notes
2024	1.	Moterų A Lyga	3.		
2025	1.	Moterų A Lyga	2		

== Kit evolution ==
2024 season Home	2024 season Away	2024 season Goalkeeper

Kit manufacturer – Adidas.

== Current squad ==
As of 31 March, 2026

Note: Flags indicate national team as defined under FIFA eligibility rules; some limited exceptions apply. Players may hold more than one non-FIFA nationality.

No.	Pos.	Nation	Player
1	GK	LTU	
31	GK	MDA	Margarita Panova (captain)
?	DF	LTU	Lolita Žižytė
3	DF	NCA	Yorcelly Humphreys
4	DF	LTU	Alina Špakovskaja
8	DF	LTU	Augustė Andrijevskytė
14	DF	SSD	Amy Lasu Lauya Lasu
44	DF	UKR	Ruslana Levchenko
2	MF	LTU	Goda Papartytė

No.	Pos.	Nation	Player
13	MF	MDA	Irina Topal
18	MF	LTU	Marta Šmidt
19	MF	LTU	Neonila Ivanovskaja
23	MF	LTU	Aistė Šveckutė
50	MF	LTU	Gabija Valiukevičiūtė
99	MF	LTU	Saulė Uždavinytė
—	MF	MDA	Anastasia Cernitu
11	FW	URU	Edith Garcia
14	FW	LTU	Ūla Miniotaitė
21	FW	UKR	Valeriia Postol
22	FW	MDA	Iuliana Colnic

== Managers ==
- (Lithuania) Artūr Sikorskij (2024–2025);
- (Lithuania) Domas Paulauskas (2026–);

== Notable players ==
Players who have either appeared in at least one match for their respective national teams at any time or received an individual award while at the club. Players whose names are listed in bold represented their countries while playing for FK Transinvest.

Other

- (Lithuania) **Lolita Žižytė**
- (Lithuania) **Marija Galkina**
- (Lithuania) **Greta Valikonienė**
- (Lithuania) **Aušrinė Bikutė**

Latvia

- (Nicaragua) **Yorcelly Humphreys**
- (Moldova) **Irina Topal**
- (Moldova) **Iuliana Colnic**
- (Ukraine) **Khrystyna Pereviznyk**
