= Sintija Greijere =

Latvian footballer

Personal information
- Date of birth: 23 October 1980 (age 46)
- Position: Forward

Senior career*
Years	Team	Apps	(Gls)
- Gintra Universitetas
- Liepājas Metalurgs

International career^{‡}
2011–2013	Latvia	6	(0)
- * Club domestic league appearances and goals ‡ National team caps and goals as of 9 April 2013

Sintija Greijere (born 23 October 1980) is a Latvian former footballer who played as a forward. She has been a member of the Latvia women's national team.
