= Ina Budestean =

Moldovan-Azerbaijani football goalkeeper

Personal information
- Full name: Ina Budestean (Note: Full name in her Moldovan nationality.); Ina Boyko (Note: Full name in the Azerbaijani nationality was given.)
- Birth name: Ina Budeștean
- Date of birth: 3 February 1987 (age 39) (Note: Competing as Ina Boyko, the displayed date of birth was 3 February 1991 (age 35).)
- Place of birth: Kishinev, Moldavian SSR, USSR
- Position: Goalkeeper

Senior career*
Years	Team	Apps	(Gls)
–200?	Codru Chisinau		
201?–2014	Gintra Universitetas		
2015	Östersunds DFF	16	(0)

International career
2002–200?	Moldova U-19	12	(0)
2005–2015	Moldova	6	(0)
- As Ina Boyko
2009	Azerbaijan U-19	6	(0)
2009	Azerbaijan	3	(0)
- * Club domestic league appearances and goals

Ina Budestean (born 3 February 1987) is a Moldovan former footballer who played as a goalkeeper. She has been a member of the Moldova women's national team.

Born and raised in Moldova, Budestean played with the country under-19 football team in 2002, and in 2005 she made her debut in the UEFA Women's Cup (now UEFA Women's Champions League) with FC Codru Anenii Noi. She became cap-tied to Moldova on 7 May 2006, when she had already made more than three official appearances for the senior team, all of them happening at the 2007 FIFA Women's World Cup qualification (UEFA second category). After that, the Moldovan senior team was disbanded. Some time later, she accepted a proposal from the Association of Football Federations of Azerbaijan to represent that nation using a new name, Ina Boyko, and a new date of birth, four years younger than originally registered with UEFA as player for Moldova. She played then with the Azerbaijan under-19 team at the 2009 UEFA Women's Under-19 Championship second qualifying round and the 2010 UEFA Women's Under-19 Championship first qualifying round and with the Azerbaijan senior team at the 2011 World Cup qualifiers. Azerbaijan uses to recruit players from other CIS countries. As a naturalized Azerbaijani citizen, she played for Lithuanian club Gintra Universitetas at the UEFA Women's Champions League. In January 2010, she was found by UEFA as ineligible to play for Azerbaijan. She has then received a ban from club and international competitions until 30 November 2010. By 2014, she resumed to play as Ina Budestean, being still the Gintra Universitetas first-choice goalkeeper. On 19 February 2015, Budestean played with the senior Moldova women's national team in a 1–4 friendly loss to Romanian club FCU Olimpia Cluj. Shortly after, she joined Swedish Elitettan club Östersunds DFF.

== See also ==
- List of Moldova women's international footballers
