= Judan Ali =

English coach

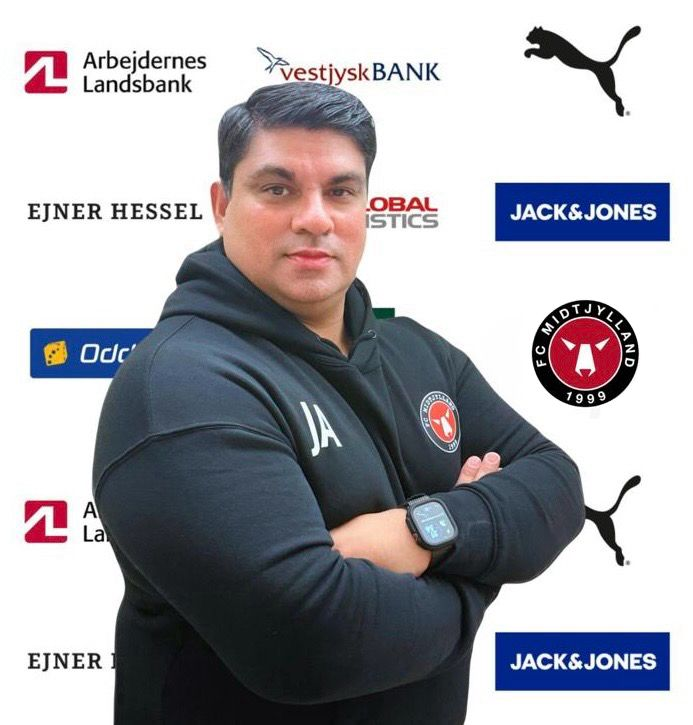
- Judan Ali with FC Midtjylland, as head of youth development.

Personal information
- Full name: Judan Ali
- Date of birth: 8 May 1973 (age 53)
- Place of birth: Tower Hamlets, London

Youth career
- Years: Team
- Arsenal
- Barcelona

Managerial career
- 2016: PS TNI

Judan Ali is an English football football coach, working as the head of development for F.C. Ebedei. He is the first BAME British national to hold a position of technical director for a FIFA member association.

== Early life ==
Ali was born in Brick Lane, Tower Hamlets, London. He requested trials at various English clubs, with none of them responded. He was taken on by Arsenal for a two-year stint at the club's academy.

== Professional career ==
=== FC Barcelona ===
Between 2003 and 2009, Ali studied coaching in FC Barcelona's academy La Masia.

=== Saint Kitts & Nevis Football Association ===
In April 2012, Ali was invited to train the St Kitts and Nevis men's, under-17 and under-20 national football teams during their training for their upcoming World Cup qualifiers.

=== Latvia Football Federation ===
In November 2012, Ali travelled to Latvia to oversee the UEFA A License course for Latvian national team coaches.

=== Iceland ===
In November 2012, Ali visited Iceland to deliver his coaching sessions to Icelandic coaches.

=== Blackburn Rovers F.C. ===
In 2012, Ali was appointed by Blackburn Rovers FC as their U23 and academy coach after being invited as a 'guest' coach by the owners.

=== Chinese Taipei National Football Team ===
In March 2013, Ali was appointed head of elite football development in Taiwan.

=== Kitchee Sports Club ===
In April 2015, Ali joined the coaching staff of Kitchee SC youth team.

=== PS TNI ===
In March 2016, Ali was appointed as the manager and head coach for PS TNI, now Persikabo 1973.

=== Persela Lamongan ===
Also in 2016, Ali was appointed as the technical director for Persela Lamongan.

=== Persiga Trenggalek ===
Later in 2016, Ali was appointed as the sporting director for Persiga Trenggalek.

=== The Football Association of Maldives ===
In December 2019, Ali was appointed as the technical director for the Football Association of Maldives. He was fired in October 2020 amidst the COVID-19 pandemic.

=== Grays Athletic FC ===
In May 2022, Ali was appointed as manager of Grays Athletic F.C.'s women team.

=== FC Hegelmann ===
In August 2023, Ali was appointed as FC Hegelmann women's head coach. In 2024 he was promoted to technical director of FC Hegelmann.

=== FC Ebedei ===
In June 2025, Ali joined FC Midtjylland's affiliates F.C. Ebedei as their head of development.

=== Ireland ===
In March 2026, Ali was a part of the Department of Culture, Communications and Sport's initiative to fill new academy director roles across football clubs in Ireland.

== Other affiliations ==
=== Film ===
In 2007, Ali was involved in casting for the film Dhan Dhana Dhan Goal.

=== Charity ===
In September 2007, Ali took part in the Premier League All Stars football tournament for charity, representing Chelsea F.C. alongside Ross Kemp and Omid Djalili.

In September 2012, Ali was involved in The UK's Anti-Racism Educational Charity's Show Racism the Red Card where he played for Tamer Hassan's XI.

=== Professional Female Football Academy ===
The Judan Ali Football Academy was set up by Ali in 2019 with co-founders Jessica Carter and Ann-Katrin Berger. The academy aims to take girls from underprivileged backgrounds and develop them into professional footballers.
