= Alina Petrauskaitė =

Lithuanian footballer

Personal information
- Date of birth: 21 October 1987 (age 39)
- Position: Defender

Senior career*
Years	Team	Apps	(Gls)
- Gintra Universitetas

International career^{‡}
2004–2005	Lithuania U19	6	(0)
2006	Lithuania	3	(0)
- * Club domestic league appearances and goals ‡ National team caps and goals as of 23 November 2006

Alina Petrauskaitė (born 21 October 1987) is a Lithuanian former footballer who played as a defender. She has been a member of the Lithuania women's national team.

== International career ==
Petrauskaitė capped for Lithuania at senior level during the UEFA Women's Euro 2009 qualifying (preliminary round).
