= Elena Turcan =

Moldovan footballer

Elena Ţurcan
Personal information
- Date of birth: 11 June 1975 (age 51)
- Place of birth: Ștefan Vodă, Soviet Union (now Moldova)
- Position: Midfielder

Senior career*
Years	Team	Apps	(Gls)
- Ryazan-VDV
- Roma Calfa
- Gintra Universitetas
- Noroc

International career
200?–200?	Moldova	5	(1)
- * Club domestic league appearances and goals

Elena Ţurcan (born 11 June 1975) is a Moldovan former footballer who played as a midfielder. She has been a member of the Moldova women's national team.

== International career ==
Ţurcan capped for Moldova at senior level during the UEFA second categories of two FIFA Women's World Cup qualifiers (2003 and 2007).
