= Greta Valikonienė =

Lithuanian football and futsal player

Greta Valikonienė Greta Guižauskaitė
Personal information
- Date of birth: 31 January 1997 (age 29)
- Position: Defender

Team information
- Current team: Transinvest
- Number: 9

Senior career*
Years	Team	Apps	(Gls)
2015–2016	MFA Žalgiris	34	(1)
2017	Vilniaus FM - Amber	10	(11)
2018	Vilniaus regiono jungtinė komanda	10	(10)
2019	Vilnaius FK JL Stars (futsal)	8	(5)
2019	Vilniaus regiono jungtinė komanda	10	(11)
2020	Vilniaus FK JL Stars (futsal)	6	(1)
2020	Utenis Utena	19	(0)
2021–2022	Vilnius	40	(7)
2024–	Transinvest	1	(0)

International career^{‡}
2012–2013	Lithuania U17	6	(0)
2014–2015	Lithuania U19	6	(0)
2015–	Lithuania	16	(0)
2018	Lithuania (futsal)	2	(0)
- * Club domestic league appearances and goals as of 21 March 2024. ‡ National team caps and goals as of 2 December 2025.

Greta Valikonienė (née Guižauskaitė; (born 31 January 1997) is a Lithuanian footballer who plays as a defender for Transinvest. She is also a futsal player, and represented Lithuania internationally in both football and futsal.

== Club career ==
Guižauskaitė has played for MFA Žalgiris, Vilniaus FM - Amber, Vilniaus regiono jungtinė komanda, Vilnaius FK JL Stars' women's futsal team and FK Utenos Utenis in Lithuania.

== International career ==
Guižauskaitė has been capped for Lithuania at senior level in both football and futsal. In football, she represented Lithuania at two UEFA Women's Under-17 Championship qualifications (2013 and 2014), two UEFA Women's Under-19 Championship qualifications (2015 and 2016) and the UEFA Women's Euro 2022 qualifying. She made her senior debut on 29 August 2015 during the Baltic Cup against Latvia.

In futsal, Guižauskaitė played for Lithuania at the UEFA Women's Futsal Euro 2019 (preliminary round).
