= Narmina Rzayeva =

Azerbaijani footballer (born 1992)

Personal information
- Date of birth: 27 May 1992 (age 34)
- Position: Forward

Senior career*
Years	Team	Apps	(Gls)
- Gintra Universitetas

International career^{‡}
2007–2008	Azerbaijan U17	6	(0)
	Azerbaijan U19	12	(2)
2009	Azerbaijan	3	(0)
- * Club domestic league appearances and goals ‡ National team caps and goals as of 22 November 2009

Narmina Rzayeva (Azerbaijani: Nərminə Rzayeva; born 27 May 1992) is an Azerbaijani former footballer who played as a forward. She has officially played for the senior Azerbaijan women's national team.
