= Roida Rzayeva =

Azerbaijani philosopher

- Roida Oktay gizi Rzayeva
- Born: 1979 (age 46–47); Baku, Azerbaijan
- Education: Baku State University
- Scientific career
- Fields: Philosophy, Oriental studies
- Workplaces: Azerbaijan National Academy of Sciences

Roida Rzayeva — (Azerbaijani: Roida Oqtay qızı Rzayeva; born on 3 February 1979, Baku, Azerbaijan Republic) is an Azerbaijani philosopher, Orientalist, Doctor of Science in Philosophy (D.Sc.), and professor.

== Life and education ==
Roida Oktay gizi Rzayeva was born in 1979 in Baku. In 1996, she finished high school with the awards of honor. In 2000, Rzayeva graduated from the Turkish Department of Oriental Studies Faculty in Baku State University with the bachelor honors diploma. In 2002, she acquired master honors diploma from the same department. From 2001 to 2010, she worked as a simultaneous interpreter in conferences and events at state and international levels. In 2004, Rzayeva had a training in the Embassy of the Republic of Turkey in Azerbaijan. In 2026, Roida Rzayeva successfully completed a special two-part (‘Exercising Leadership: Foundational Principles’ (completed in 2025) and ‘Rhetoric: The Art of Persuasive Writing and Public Speaking’) programme entitled “Leadership and Communication”, organised by the Harvard Kennedy School of Government, and received a professional certificate from Harvard University.

== Scientific and pedagogical activity ==
From 2002 to 2011, she worked at the Azerbaijan National Academy of Sciences, in the Institute for Oriental Studies named after Academician Z.M. Bunyadov. In 2007, Rzayeva defended her PhD thesis on philosophical sciences ("The Socio-Cultural Analysis of Modernization in Modern Turkey") in the Institute for Oriental Studies named after academician Z.M. Bunyadov, Azerbaijan National Academy of Sciences.

From 2003 to 2004, and from 2007 to 2008, Rzayeva gave lectures at Turkish Department of Oriental Studies Faculty, Baku State University.

From 2002 to 2005, she worked as a teacher and a head of Russian Department at FONO Institution of Open Education under the Ministry of Education, Republic of Turkey. From 2005 to 2010, Rzayeva was a chairman of the Young Scientists’ Council of the Institute for Oriental Studies named after Academician Z.M. Bunyadov and a chairman of Department for Humanitarian and Social Sciences of Youth Intellectual Development Center in Azerbaijan National Academy of Sciences. From 2008 to 2010, Rzaeva was a member of an editorial board of the scientific journal Transactions of young scientists, published on initiative of the Centre of Intellectual development of Azerbaijan National Academy of Sciences, the Ministry of Youth and Sports of Azerbaijan Republic and the Society of Young scientists, post-graduate students and masters. From January 2011 to March 2017, she worked as a deputy director of Institute of Philosophy, Sociology and Law, Azerbaijan National Academy of Sciences. From 2012 to 2017, she was deputy editor-in-chief of the journal Scientific Works which has been published in Institute of Philosophy and Law, National Academy of Sciences.

In 2013, she became an associate professor. In 2013, Rzaeva was elected the chairman of the Council of young scientists and experts of Institute of Philosophy, Sociology and Law, Azerbaijan National Academy of Sciences, and in 2014, was elected a member of the board of the Council of young scientists and experts of Azerbaijan National Academy of Sciences. In 2016, Rzayeva defended her D.Sc. thesis on philosophical sciences, ("Postmodern and Analysis of Development` Concepts of Turkish Public Consciousness") in Azerbaijan National Academy of Sciences. Since 2020, she works as a head of Department of History and Theory of Oriental Studies in Institute of Oriental Studies named after academician Z.M.Bunyadov, Azerbaijan National Academy of Sciences.

In 2023, she became a professor.

== Awards ==
(2002)-She was awarded with a diploma of the Ministry of Education of Azerbaijan Republic for the best report at the section of Oriental Studies. (2007) – Rzayeva was awarded with the honorary diploma of Youth Intellectual Development Centre for distinguishing herself in pursue youth policy, taking an active stand in matters of defense interests of young scientists and on the occasion of 2007 – Youth's Year in Azerbaijan. (2008)-She earned a diploma and was given the award "Young Scientist of the Year" for her scientific achievements in 2007th year. (2010)-Rzayeva became a prize-winner of the international award in a nomination "Social Sciences" at the international competition of the young scientists of countries of the CIS (Commonwealth of Independent States). (2015)-The honorary diploma of Department of Social Studies, Azerbaijan National Academy of Sciences on the occasion of 70-year-old anniversary of ANAS for long and fruitful scientific activity. (2024)-She was awarded with the "Ziya Göyalp Society Award" by the International Eurasian Association of Educational Unions for his contributions to the "Turkish scientific world" with her scientific activities in her field. She has been officially thanked for organizational, pedagogical and research activity by the Ministry of National Education of the Republic of Turkey (2003–2008), Ege University of the Republic of Turkey (2010), the Ministry of Culture and Tourism of the Republic of Azerbaijan (2011), the Ministry of Family and Social Policy of the Republic of Turkey (2013), the Turkish Academy of Sciences (2014).

== Selected publications ==
- Пути развития турецкой литературы (R.Əhmədov ilə həmmüəllifliklə). Баку: "Nafta-Press", 2001, 280 s.
- Rus ve Azerbaycan Kaynaklarında Türk Modernleşmesi. Ankara: Lotus Yayın Grubu, Otorite Yayınları, 2012, 271 s.
- Постмодерн и мультикультурализм: междисциплинарный дискурс. Баку: "Елм ве тахсил", 2015, 300 s.
- Незападная современность в дискурсе постмодерна и культурной полифонии. Баку: "Елм ве тахсил", 2015, 328 s.
- The Challenges of Contemporaneity: Postmodernity and Multiculturalism. Springer, 2016.
- Siyasәtin fәlsәfәsi. Analitik diskurslar: ideologiya, media, diplomatiya. Bakı, “Tәhsil Nәşriyyat-Poliqrafiya” MMC, 2025, 336 s.
- К вопросу о символической политике постмодернистского мира // Вопросы философии. 2011. No. 9.
- Дихотомия «Запад – не Запад» в дискурсе незападной современности и постмодерна // Вопросы философии. 2012. No. 12.
- Конец метанарративов в контексте проблематики прошлого и вызовов будущего // Вопросы философии. 2014. No. 2.
- Modernleşme Süreci Üzerine.
- Мультикультурализм в постмодернистском контексте / Proceedings of the XXIII World Congress of Philosophy, 2018.
- Orientalism and Ottoman Modernisation in the Discourse of Postmodernism // European Journal of Multidisciplinary Studies, 2019.
- Türk Dünyası ve Stratejik Siyasetin Felsefesi: Yumuşak Güç ve Medya // Sakarya Üniversitesi Türk Akademi Dergisi. 2023. No. 2(2).
