= Rzazade =

Rzazade is a surname. Notable people with the surname include:

- Aliabbas Rzazade (born 1998), Azerbaijani wrestler
- Elshan Rzazade (born 1993), Azerbaijani footballer
