= Klaudija Savickaitė =

Lithuanian footballer

Personal information
- Date of birth: 13 September 1994 (age 32)
- Height: 1.77 m (5 ft 10 in)
- Position: Goalkeeper

Team information
- Current team: Torres

Senior career*
Years	Team	Apps	(Gls)
2015–2016	LSU Žara		
2017–2019	Kauno Žalgiris		
2017	→ Gintra Universitetas (loan)	0	(0)
2018	→ Gintra Universitetas (loan)	0	(0)
2019–	Torres		

International career^{‡}
2020–	Lithuania	2	(0)
- * Club domestic league appearances and goals ‡ National team caps and goals as of 6 March 2020

Klaudija Savickaitė (born 13 September 1994) is a Lithuanian footballer who plays as a goalkeeper for Italian Serie C club ASD FC Sassari Torres Femminile and the Lithuania women's national team.
