= FK Banga (women) =

Association football club

Banga Gargždai
- Full name: Futbolo klubas Banga
- Nickname: Tigrų ekipa
- Founded: 1966; 60 years ago
- Ground: Gargždai Stadium, Gargždai
- Capacity: ~2,300
- Chairman: Rimantas Mikalauskas
- Manager: Simonas Alsys
- League: Moterų A Lyga
- 2025: Moterų A Lyga, 6th of 10
- Website: https://www.fkbanga.lt/
Home colours	Away colours

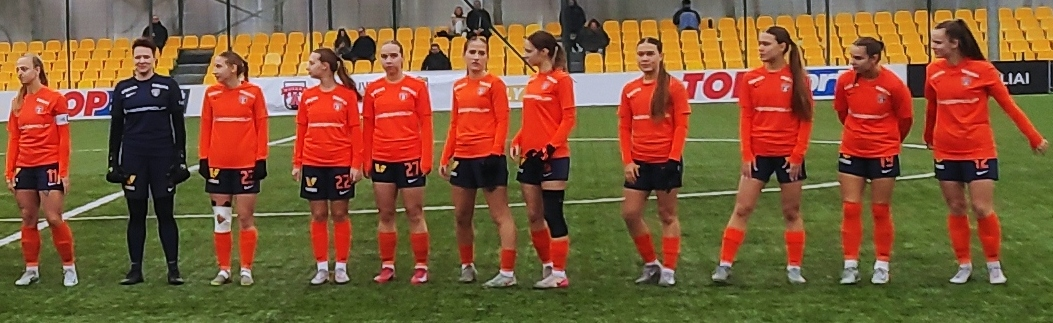
FK Banga (women); 9 November 2025.

FK Banga is a Lithuanian women's football team based in Gargždai. They play in the Moterų A Lyga (lt. moterų A lyga), the first tier of Lithuanian football.

== History ==
In early 2016 was founded the women's team of football club FK Banga. From 2016 season played in Moterų A Lyga. In 2016, 2018 and 2019 was third in championship.

== Achievements ==
(Lithuania) Moterų A Lyga

- Third place (3): 2016, 2018, 2019

== Recent seasons ==
Season	Level	League	Place	Web	Notes
2016	1.	Moterų A Lyga	3.		
2017	1.	Moterų A Lyga	4.		
2018	1.	Moterų A Lyga	3.		
2019	1.	Moterų A Lyga	3.		
2020	1.	Moterų A Lyga	4.		
2021	1.	Moterų A Lyga	4.		
2022	1.	Moterų A Lyga	6.		
2023	1.	Moterų A Lyga	5.		
2024	1.	Moterų A Lyga	5.		
2025	1.	Moterų A Lyga	6.		

== Current squad ==
As of 23 January, 2026

Note: Flags indicate national team as defined under FIFA eligibility rules; some limited exceptions apply. Players may hold more than one non-FIFA nationality.

No.	Pos.	Nation	Player
2		LTU	Laura Ubartaitė
4	MF	LTU	Donata Švarcaitė
5	DF	LTU	Mišelė Korsakaitė
6	FW	LTU	Kristina Černavskich
7	FW	LTU	Evelina Petrauskaitė
9	MF	LTU	Monika Judeikytė
10	FW	LTU	Lijana Gedminaitė
11	DF	LTU	Monika Grikšaitė (captain)
12	DF	LTU	Odeta Naujokaitė
13	FW	LTU	Roberta Tarasevičiūtė
14		LTU	Aina Skėrutė

No.	Pos.	Nation	Player
15		LTU	Modesta Gečaitė
17	MF	LTU	Virginija Jokšaitė
23	MF	LTU	Kamilė Pranulytė
25		LTU	Agnė Bonadrenko
26	MF	LTU	Vitalija Žatkina
27	MF	LTU	Laura Bagdonaitė
37	MF	LTU	Austėja Lekavičiūtė
55	MF	LTU	Agnetė Kuprytė
69	MF	LTU	Paulina Narbutaitė
97	FW	LTU	Akvilė Gedminaitė

== Kit evolution ==
- Kits at home: orange kits, shorts and socks with darkblue signs.

2018	2019	2021

- Away kits: dark blue kits, shorts and socks with orange signs.

2018	2019	2021

Kit manufacturer – Nike.

== Managers ==
- (Portugal) David Afonso
- (Lithuania) Simonas Alsys

== Notable players ==
Players who have either appeared in at least one match for their respective national teams at any time or received an individual award while at the club. Players whose names are listed in bold represented their countries while playing for FK Banga.

Lithuania

- (Lithuania) **Monika Grikšaitė**
- (Lithuania) **Lijana Gedminaitė**
- (Lithuania) **Viltė Švarcaitė**
- (Lithuania) **Paulina Narbutaitė**
- (Lithuania) **Austė Bernotaitė**

Latvia

- (Latvia) **Tatjana Baļičeva**
