= Lijana Gedminaitė =

Lithuanian footballer

Personal information
- Date of birth: 25 December 1998 (age 27)
- Position: Forward

Team information
- Current team: Banga
- Number: 10

Youth career
- –2015: Klaipėdos FM

Senior career*
Years	Team	Apps	(Gls)
2016–2024	Banga	113	(92)

International career^{‡}
2013–2014	Lithuania U17	6	(1)
2015–2016	Lithuania U19	7	(3)
2016–	Lithuania	13	(0)
- * Club domestic league appearances and goals as of 21 March 2024 ‡ National team caps and goals as of 6 March 2020

Lijana Gedminaitė (born 25 December 1998) is a Lithuanian footballer who plays as a forward for Banga and the Lithuania women's national team.
