= Lolita Žižytė =

Lithuanian footballer

Personal information
- Full name: Lolita Žižytė
- Date of birth: 27 July 1998 (age 28)
- Place of birth: Ukmergė
- Height: 1.77 m (5 ft 10 in)
- Position: Defender

Team information
- Current team: FK Traninvest Women
- Number: 15

Senior career*
| Years | Team | Apps | (Gls) |
| 2015–2017 | Jonava | | |
| 2017–2021 | Gintra Universitetas | | |
| 2021–2022 | Venezia FC | | |

International career^{‡}
| 2017– | Lithuania | 33 | (1) |
- * Club domestic league appearances and goals as of 19:43, 30 August 2019 (UTC) ‡ National team caps and goals as of 1 April 2026 (UTC)

Lolita Žižytė (born 27 July 1998) is a Lithuanian footballer who plays as a defender in Croatia's SuperSport Women's First league club ŽNK Medimurje-Cakovec and the Lithuania women's national team.

== Career ==
Žižytė has been capped for the Lithuania national team, appearing for the team during the 2019 FIFA Women's World Cup qualifying cycle.
