= Gargždai Stadium =

Stadium in Gargždai, Lithuania

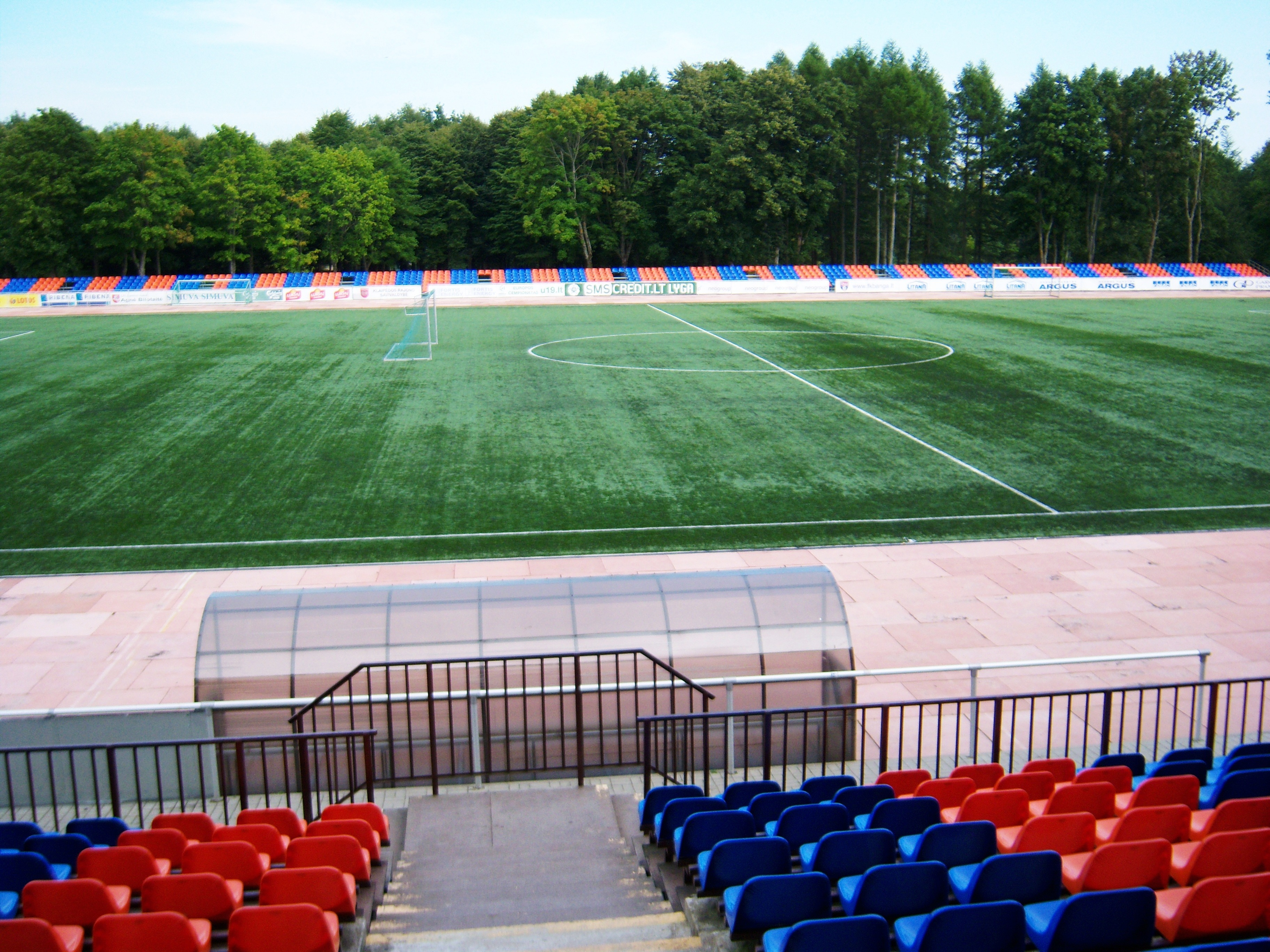
- UEFA Category 2 stadium
- Interactive map of Gargždai Stadium
- Full name: Gargždai Stadium
- Location: Gargždai, Lithuania
- Coordinates: 55°42′55″N 21°24′16″E
- Capacity: 2,323
- Surface: Artificial pitch
- Field shape: rectangular

Tenant
- FK Banga Gargždai

Gargždai Stadium is a multi-use stadium in Gargždai, Lithuania. It is mostly used for football matches and hosts the home games of the team, FK Banga Gargždai, of the A Lyga. The capacity of the stadium is 2,323 spectators.
