= FC Gintra =

- Full name: Futbolo klubas Gintra
- Founded: 1999
- Ground: Savivaldybė Stadium
- Capacity: 4000
- Chairman: Gintaras Radavičius
- Manager: Artūr Sikorskij
- League: Moterų A Lyga
- 2026: Champions
- Website: www.fkgintra.lt
Home colours	Away colours	Third colours

FC Gintra is a Lithuanian women's football club from Šiauliai.

== History ==
The club plays in the highest Lithuanian league, the A Lyga and has won 13 championships so far. The fourth one in 2005 and every championship since then.

After its championships, the club played in the UEFA Women's Cup and from 2009 onwards in the UEFA Women's Champions League. The club participated only in the qualifying rounds though, playing 3 games each season, and the best result achieved was 1 win, 1 tie and 1 loss thus failing to move on to the next round.

The club took part in the 2010–11 UEFA Women's Champions League qualifying round and managed a good 2nd place after beating ZFK Borec (Macedonia), drawing to Klaksvikar Itrottarfelag (Faroe Islands) and only losing to England's Everton. All games were hosted by Gintra in Lithuania. In the 2014/15 edition they finished as best runners-up and advanced to the round of 32 for the first time in ten seasons.

== Honours ==
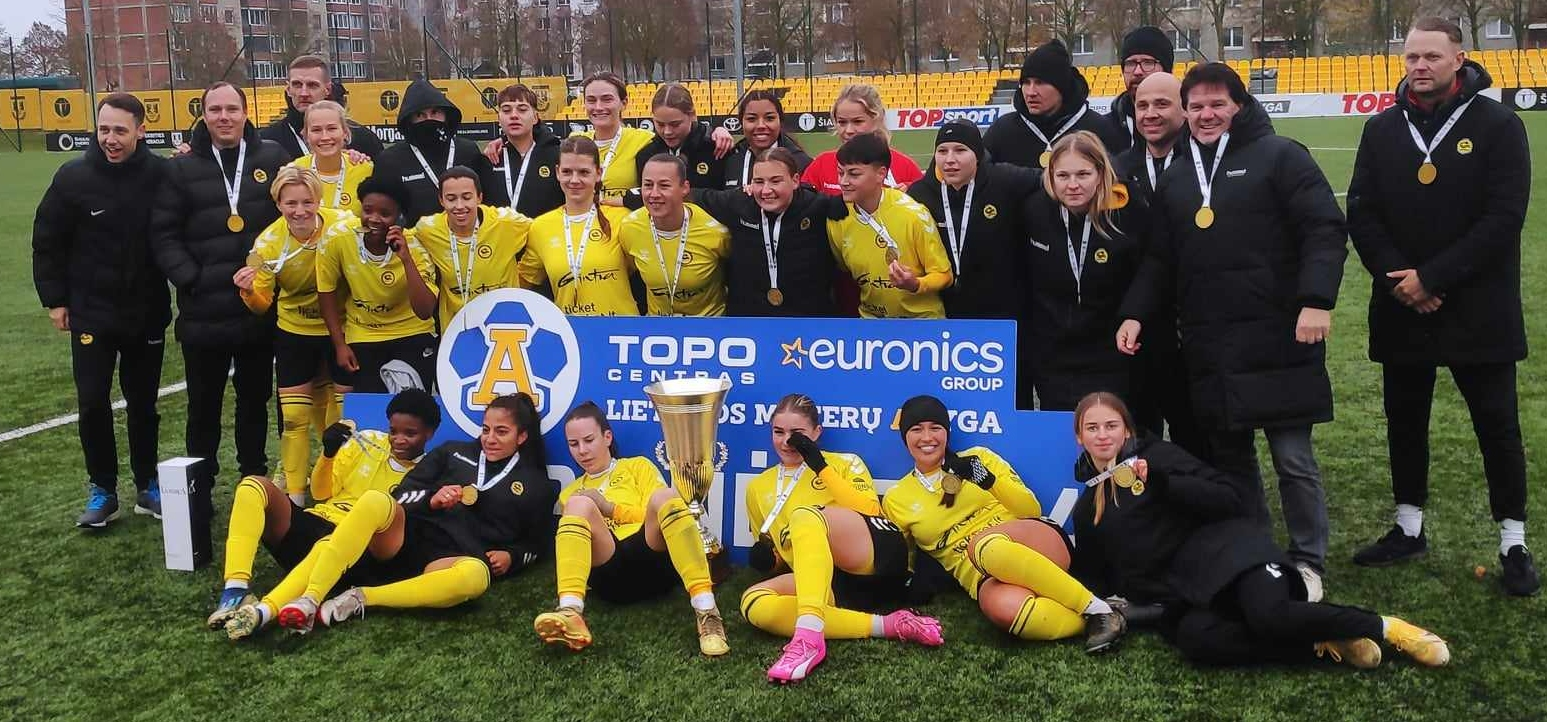
FC Gintra 2024

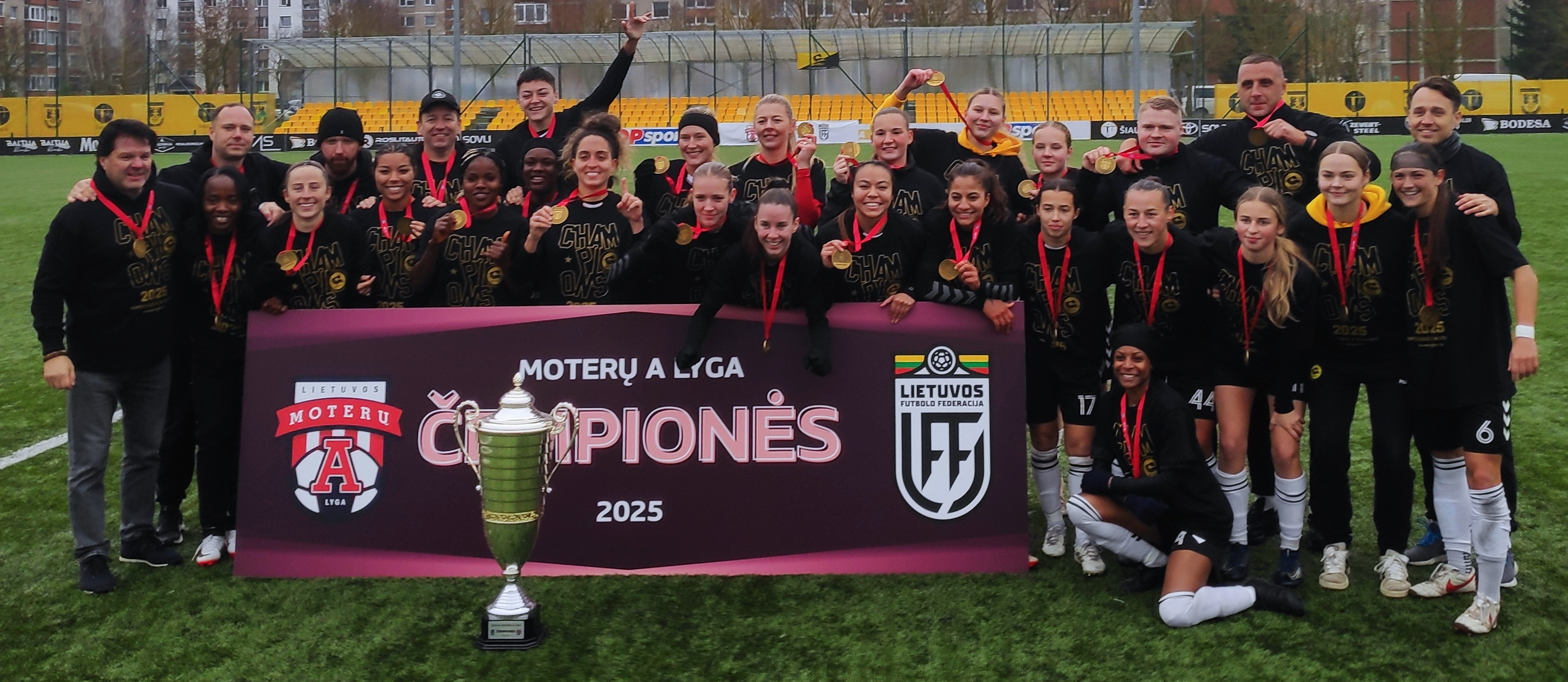
FC Gintra 2025

- Moterų A Lyga (25): 1999, 2000, 2003, 2005 to 2026
- Lithuanian Women's Cup (12) : 2005 to 2016
- Lithuanian Women's Supercup (1) : 2006
- Baltic League (4): 2017, 2019, 2022, 2023

== Players ==
=== Current squad ===
As of 24 July 2026

Note: Flags indicate national team as defined under FIFA eligibility rules; some limited exceptions apply. Players may hold more than one non-FIFA nationality.

No.	Pos.	Nation	Player
1	GK	LTU	Gabrielė Vasilenko
2	DF	USA	Makeila Yancey
4	DF	LTU	Andžela Vaičytė
5	MF	BRA	Sabrina
7	FW	LTU	Meida Proscevičiūtė
8	MF	BRA	Lidiane Ribeiro
10	MF	LTU	Marija Galkina (N)
11	MF	LTU	Dominyka Misiūnaitė
13	MF	BRA	Julia Dias
15	FW	LTU	Saulutė Railaitė
16	FW	LTU	Agnieška Kazarina

No.	Pos.	Nation	Player
17	DF	LTU	Tereza Romanovskaja
20	MF	FIN	Anni Hakasalo
21	DF	LTU	Aivė Andiuškevičiūtė (N)
22	DF	LTU	Athena Diachenko (N)
23	DF	LTU	Aistė Šveckutė (N)
24	MF	CAN	Tamara Brown
27	MF	LTU	Eitvydė Partikaitė
29	DF	LTU	Laura Kubiliūtė
30	MF	LTU	Urtė Bujokaitė
44	DF	LTU	Algimantė Mikutaitė
77	MF	ZAM	Misozi Zulu (N)
81	GK	UKR	Alla Herasymchuk (N)
88	MF	UKR	Khrystyna Pereviznyk (N)

=== Former internationals ===
- Lithuania: Raimonda Bložytė-Lukoševičienė, Viktorija Budrytė, Gintare Burokaitė, Oksana Imanalijeva, Rasa Imanalijeva, Rasa Jackunaitė, Gitana Kerpiėnė, Indrė Kirjanovaitė, Raimonda Kudytė, Rimantė Kunickaitė, Anika Kyžaitė, Justina Lavrenovaitė-Perez, Jurgita Mačikunytė, Rita Mažukėlytė, Brigita Partikaitė, Alina Petrauskaitė, Klaudija Savickaitė, Marija Stasiulytė, Olga Švaikevič, Kamilė Vaičiulaitytė, Liucija Vaitukaitytė, Tatjana Veržbickaja, Dovilė Gailevičiūtė, Simona Petravičienė, Algimantė Mikutaitė, Greta Lukjančukė, Vestina Neverdauskaitė, Meda Šeškutė, Paulina Sarkanaitė, Gabija Toropovaitė, Rimantė Jonušaitė, Meda Šeškutė, Lolita Žižytė, Samanta Karasiovaitė
- Azerbaijan: Ina Boyko, (Note: Ina Boyko and Ina Budestean are the same person) Narmina Rzayeva
- Belarus: Lyubov Gudchenko, Anna Pilipenko
- Bulgaria: Kristina Petrunova
- Chile: María José Rojas
- Equatorial Guinea: Laetitia Chapeh, Gloria Chinasa
- Jamaica: Toriana Patterson
- Latvia: Guna Āboliņa, Sintija Greijere, Olga Ivanova, Ņina Maksimova, Karlīna Miksone, Anastasija Ročāne
- Mexico: Christina Murillo
- Moldova: Ina Budestean, Carolina Țabur, Elena Turcan
- Namibia: Zenatha Coleman
- Nigeria: Florence Ajayi
- Serbia: Jelena Čubrilo, Nikoleta Nikolić
- South Africa: Jermaine Seoposenwe, Leandra Smeda, Nothando Vilakazi, Sphumelele Shamase, Thubelihle Shamase
- Thailand: Miranda Nild
- Ukraine: Anastasia Filenko, Tetyana Kozyrenko, Khrystyna Pereviznyk

== Record in UEFA competitions ==
Season	Competition	Stage	Result	Opponent
2004–05	UEFA Women's Cup	Qualifying Stage	0–3	(Azerbaijan) Gömrukçü Baku
2004–05	UEFA Women's Cup	Qualifying Stage	0–11	(Russia) Energiya Voronezh
2004–05	UEFA Women's Cup	Qualifying Stage	1–0	(North Macedonia) Skiponjat
2005–06	UEFA Women's Cup	Qualifying Stage	0–2	(Belarus) Universitet Vitebsk
2005–06	UEFA Women's Cup	Qualifying Stage	0–8	(Czech Republic) Sparta Prague
2005–06	UEFA Women's Cup	Qualifying Stage	2–2	(Romania) Clujana
2006–07	UEFA Women's Cup	Qualifying Stage	0–1	(Belarus) Universitet Vitebsk
2006–07	UEFA Women's Cup	Qualifying Stage	1–1	(Bosnia and Herzegovina) Sarajevo
2006–07	UEFA Women's Cup	Qualifying Stage	0–3	(Italy) Fiammamonza
2007–08	UEFA Women's Cup	Qualifying Stage	0–4	(England) Everton
2007–08	UEFA Women's Cup	Qualifying Stage	0–6	(Switzerland) Zuchwil
2007–08	UEFA Women's Cup	Qualifying Stage	2–1	(Northern Ireland) Glentoran
2008–09	UEFA Women's Cup	Qualifying Stage	0–8	(Russia) Zvezda Perm
2008–09	UEFA Women's Cup	Qualifying Stage	2–0	(Hungary) Femina Budapest
2008–09	UEFA Women's Cup	Qualifying Stage	2–2	(Faroe Islands) KÍ
2009–10	Champions League	Qualifying Stage	7–1	(Georgia (country)) Norchi Dinamoeli
2009–10	Champions League	Qualifying Stage	0–2	(Scotland) Glasgow City
2009–10	Champions League	Qualifying Stage	0–8	(Germany) Bayern Munich
2010–11	Champions League	Qualifying Stage	4–0	(North Macedonia) Borec Veles
2010–11	Champions League	Qualifying Stage	0–0	(Faroe Islands) KÍ
2010–11	Champions League	Qualifying Stage	0–7	(England) Everton
2011–12	Champions League	Qualifying Stage	1–1	(Turkey) Ataşehir Belediyesi
2011–12	Champions League	Qualifying Stage	0–5	(Romania) Olimpia Cluj
2011–12	Champions League	Qualifying Stage	1–2	(Bosnia and Herzegovina) Sarajevo
2012–13	Champions League	Qualifying Stage	2–3	(Turkey) Ataşehir Belediyesi
2012–13	Champions League	Qualifying Stage	1–9	(Slovenia) Pomurje
2012–13	Champions League	Qualifying Stage	0–8	(Switzerland) Zürich
2013–14	Champions League	Qualifying Stage	3–0	(Romania) Olimpia Cluj
2013–14	Champions League	Qualifying Stage	0–6	(Serbia) Spartak Subotica
2013–14	Champions League	Qualifying Stage	0–2	(Latvia) Liepājas Metalurgs
2014–15	Champions League	Qualifying Stage	1–3	(Cyprus) Apollon Limassol
2014–15	Champions League	Qualifying Stage	2–0	(Faroe Islands) KÍ
2014–15	Champions League	Qualifying Stage	5–0	(Albania) Vllaznia
2014–15	Champions League	Round of 32	1–1, 1–1 aet (5–4 pen)	(Czech Republic) Sparta Prague
2014–15	Champions League	Round of 16	0–5, 2–0	(Denmark) Brøndby
2015–16	Champions League	Qualifying Stage	0–1	(Republic of Ireland) Wexford Youths
2015–16	Champions League	Qualifying Stage	5–1	(Wales) Cardiff Met.
2015–16	Champions League	Qualifying Stage	0–4	(Poland) Medyk Konin
2016–17	Champions League	Qualifying Stage	13–0	(Moldova) ARF Criuleni
2016–17	Champions League	Qualifying Stage	2–1	(Republic of Ireland) Wexford Youths
2016–17	Champions League	Qualifying Stage	0–3	(Kazakhstan) BIIK Kazygurt
2017–18	Champions League	Qualifying Stage	4–0	(Slovakia) Partizán Bardejov
2017–18	Champions League	Qualifying Stage	6–0	(Georgia (country)) Martve
2017–18	Champions League	Qualifying Stage	3–1	(Turkey) Konak Belediyespor
2017–18	Champions League	Round of 32	1–1, 2–1	(Switzerland) Zürich
2017–18	Champions League	Round of 16	0–6, 0–3	(Spain) Barcelona
2018–19	Champions League	Qualifying Stage	1–1	(Finland) Honka
2018–19	Champions League	Qualifying Stage	7–0	(Faroe Islands) EB/Streymur/Skála
2018–19	Champions League	Qualifying Stage	9–0	(Bulgaria) NSA Sofia
2018–19	Champions League	Round of 32	0–3, 0–4	(Czech Republic) Slavia Praha
2019–20	Champions League	Qualifying Stage	1–0	(Malta) Birkirkara
2019–20	Champions League	Qualifying Stage	1–2	(Republic of Ireland) Wexford Youths
2019–20	Champions League	Qualifying Stage	1–1	(Albania) Vllaznia
2020–21	Champions League	First qualifying round	4-0 (H)	(Slovakia) Slovan Bratislava
2020–21	Champions League	Second qualifying round	0-7 (H)	(Norway) Vålerenga
2021–22	Champions League	Qualifying Stage	2–0	(Estonia) Flora
2021–22	Champions League	Qualifying Stage	1–8	(Iceland) Breiðablik
