= Gargždai =

- City
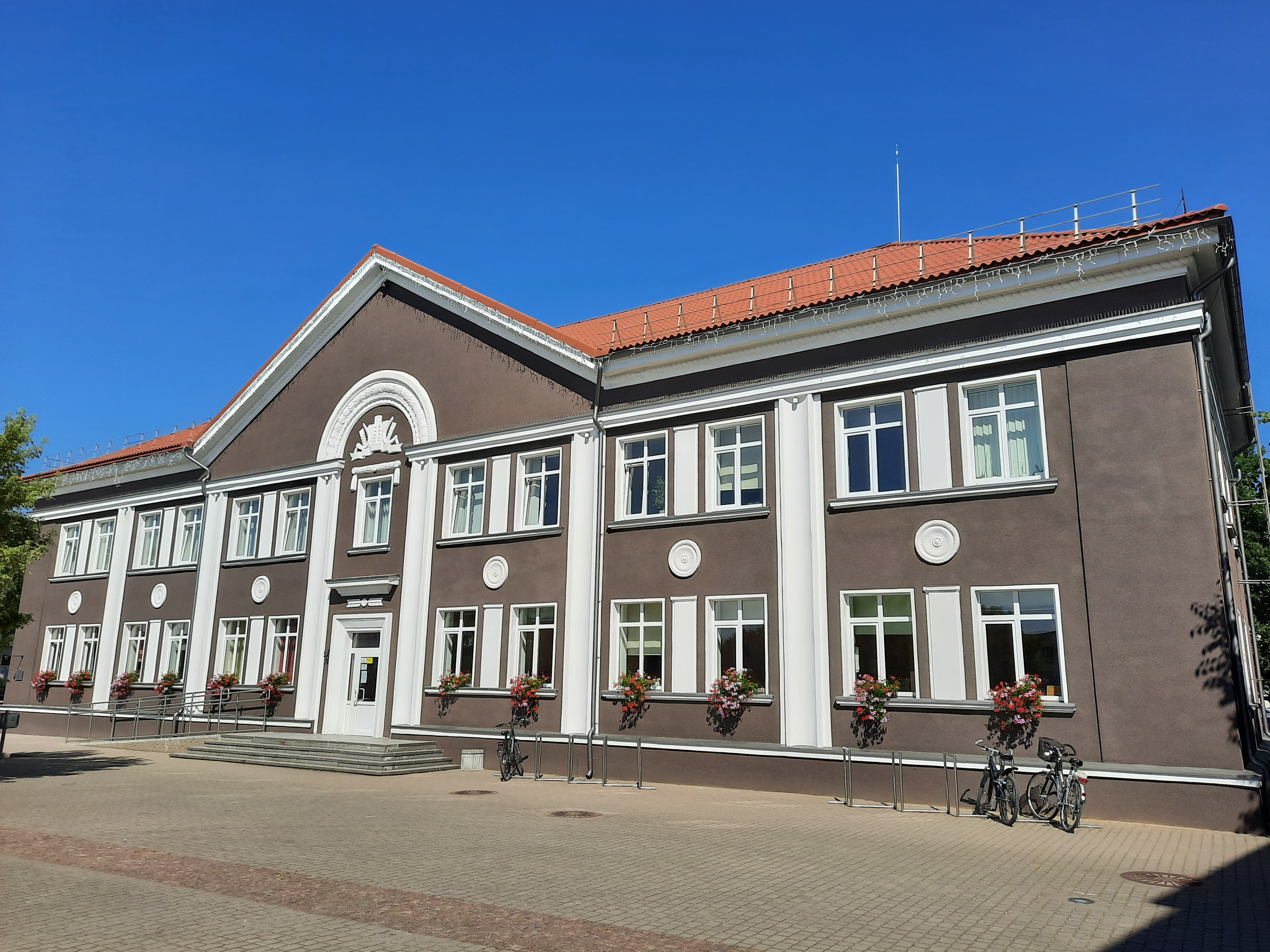
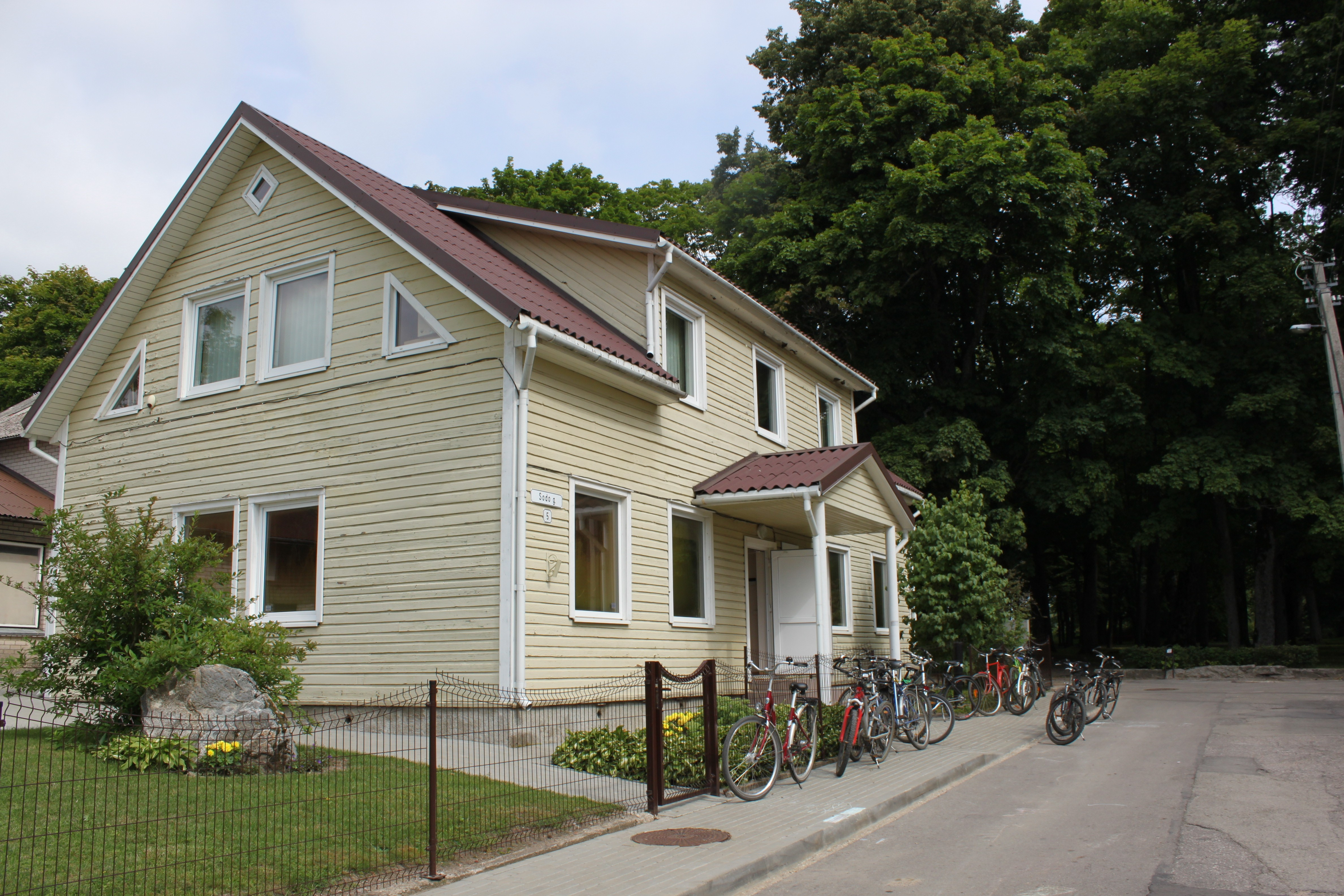
- Town Square School of Music Church of St. Michael the Archangel Klaipėda District Municipality Building Minija Oil Gargždai Stadium Gargždai Regional Museum

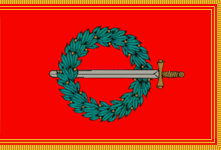
- Flag Coat of arms

- Location of Gargždai
- Coordinates: 55°42′46″N 21°24′12″E
- Country: Lithuania
- Ethnographic region: Samogitia
- County: Klaipėda County
- Municipality: Klaipėda district municipality
- Eldership: Gargždai eldership
- Capital of: Klaipėda district municipality Gargždai eldership
- First mentioned: 1253
- Granted city rights: 1792

Population (2023)
  - Total: 15,932
- Time zone: UTC+2 (EET)
  - Summer (DST): UTC+3 (EEST)

Gargždai is a city in western Lithuania located in Klaipėda County. The Minija River flows through the city. The Gargždai Stadium is the city's main sports venue where the FK Banga Gargždai play its home games.

== Etymology ==
The etymology of the town's name is uncertain, but it is thought to derive from the common word gargždas, meaning "pebbles, gravel". In the Teutonic Order partition act of 1253, the town was mentioned as Garisda. It seems reasonable to suggest that the name of the town is derived from the Gargždupis River, which flows in the vicinity of the Kalniškė hillfort adjacent to Gargždai. The name of the river may also have been influenced by its stony and gravelly banks. There is no doubt that the origin of the town's name is Curonian, as similar names are common in territories inhabited by the Curonians.

In other languages Gargždai is referred to as: Yiddish: גורזד Gorzhd, German: Garsden.

== History ==
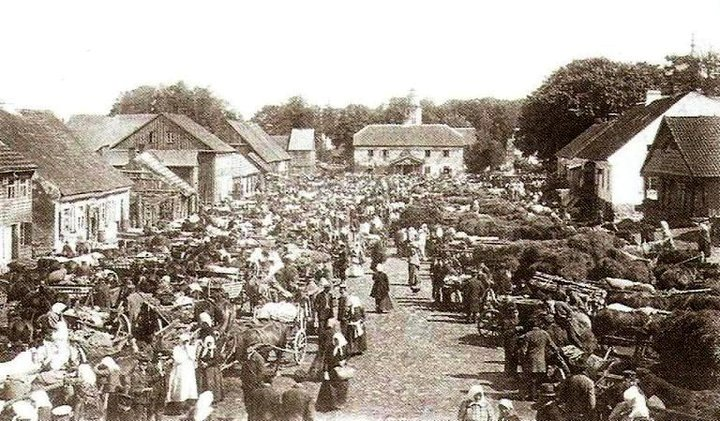
Town Square of Gargždai during a market day in circa 1910-1912

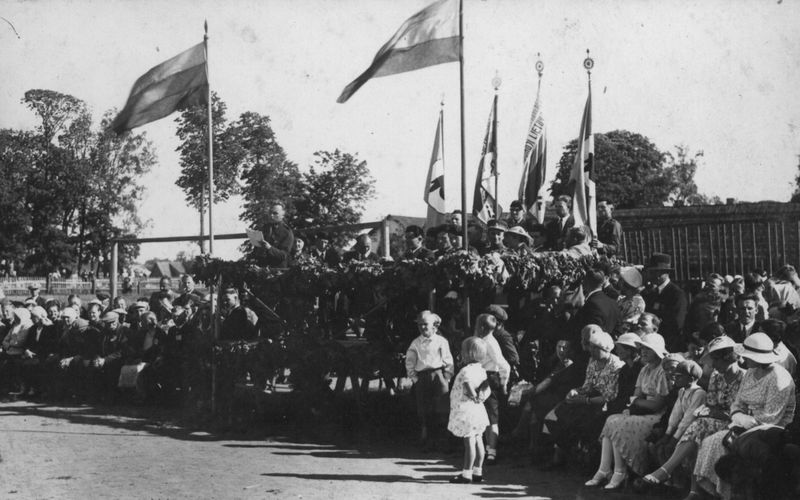
Celebration of a youth organization Young Lithuania in Gargždai in 1937

The earliest settlements of Gargždai are known to date back to the Bronze Age. In written sources Gargždai was first mentioned in 1253, in the partition act of the Teutonic Order and the Curonian Bishopric (Garisda). There was a Curonians settlement and a mound in the area. In 15th century the settlement moved to the western bank of the Minija River and its urban structure was linear.

The Gargždai Manor was first mentioned in the 16th century and it belonged to the Elders of Samogitia, the Kęsgaila family. Settlement was part of the estate until the 18th century. The first wooden Catholic Church of Gargždai was built 1534-1540 and founded by Queen Bona Sforza. In 1597, Gargždai was named a city for the first time.

On 8 January 1600, King Sigismund III Vasa granted Gargždai the privilege of trade and markets. Gargždai became the most important trade point with Klaipėda. In 1639, the King Władysław IV Vasa allowed Jews to settle in the towns of Gargždai and Palanga as well as have to have their own plots, build houses, open warehouses, and engage in various businesses. This led to the growth and prosperity of the town, as evidenced by the treasures found in Gargždai.

The 17th and 18th centuries were difficult for Gargždai due to wars and plagues. In 1786 almost the entire city burned down. In 1792, city rights and coat of arms were granted for Gargždai. In 19th century, it was a prosperous border town as the trade and crafts expanded and the town developed as a cultural and religious center. During the World War I, almost the entire town center burned down.

The number of Jewish residents of Gargždai killed by the Nazi Einsatzkommando death squad during the Holocaust is at least 500 including 200 men killed on June 24, 1941, and 300 women with children killed on September 14 and 16, 1941. The killings were perpetrated by Einsatzgruppe A under the command of SS Brigadeführer Walter Stahlecker, and documented in the Jäger report.

== Economy ==
In 2015 the development of Gargždai Industrial Park (GIP) started to take place. It is located on the city boundary, in Gamyklos street. Both industrial and commercial purpose land with a total area of 9.3 hectares (23.0 acres) is offered to foreign and domestic investors. It is expected that the new industrial park will attract foreign investments, create new job vacancies for the unemployed in the region and proclaim the city of Gargždai in other countries.

== Sports ==
- FK Banga – football club;
- FK Banga (women) – women's football team;
- Gargždai Stadium (lt. Gargždų miesto stadionas)

== Industry ==
Established in 1993 and now located in Gargždai, Mars Lietuva is one of the biggest Mars Incorporated plants in Europe. With around 800 Associates, "Mars Lietuva" produces more than 85 000 tones of over 400 different recipe varieties and formats of pet food annually, which is mainly exported to over 30 European countries.

=== Twin towns — Sister cities ===
Gargždai is twinned with:

- Iława, Poland
