= Moterų A Lyga =

Top women's football (soccer) league in Lithuania

- Founded: 1994
- Country: Lithuania
- Confederation: UEFA
- Number of clubs: 7
- Level on pyramid: 1
- Relegation to: LMFA 1st league
- Domestic cup: Lithuanian Women's Cup
- International cup: UEFA Champions League
- Current champions: FC Gintra (2026)
- Most championships: FC Gintra (25 titles)
- Current: 2026 Moterų A Lyga season

The Women's A Lyga (Lithuanian: Moterų A lyga) is Lithuania's top level women's football (soccer) league. The champion of the league qualifies for a spot in the UEFA Women's Champions League. The league is above the Lithuanian women football association's (LMFA) First League.

== 2026 teams ==
2026 season teams in Moterų A Lyga

- Banga (Gargždai)
- Transinvest (Galinė)
- FC Gintra (Šiauliai)
- MFA Žalgiris-MRU (Vilnius)
- Žalgiris (Vilnius)
- ŠSG-FA Šiauliai (Šiauliai); FA Šiauliai (women)
- Kauno rajono Futbolo Akademija (women);
- ~~Hegelmann~~ (Kaunas);

== 2025 teams ==
- Banga (Gargždai)
- Transinvest (Galinė)
- FC Gintra (Šiauliai)
- Hegelmann (Kaunas)
- MFA Žalgiris-MRU (Vilnius)
- Žalgiris (Vilnius)

== Format ==
The championship consists of 20 matchdays. The teams are playing each other 4 times. 2018 A league season started on 29 March and the last matchday will be 11 November.

== Champions ==
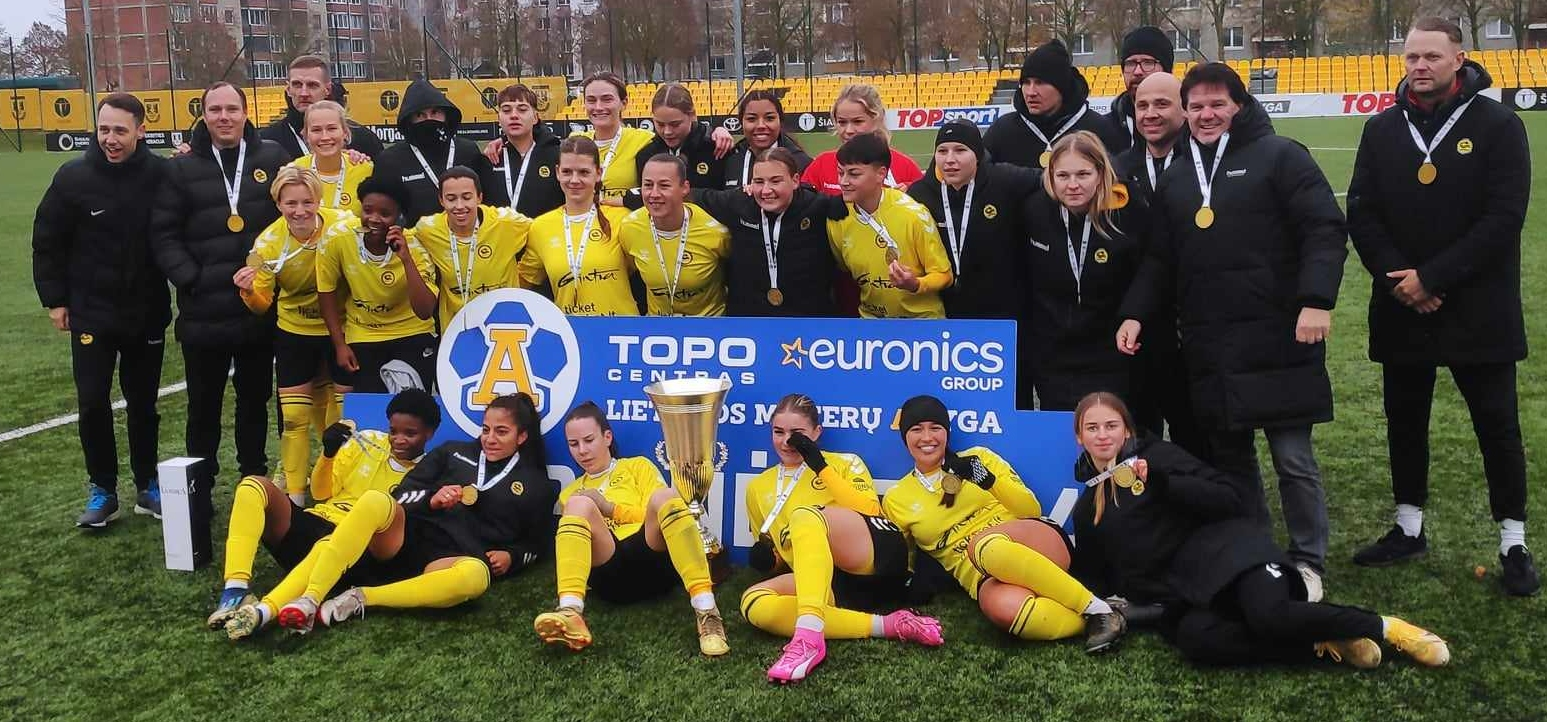
Gintra with their league's trophy, November of 2024

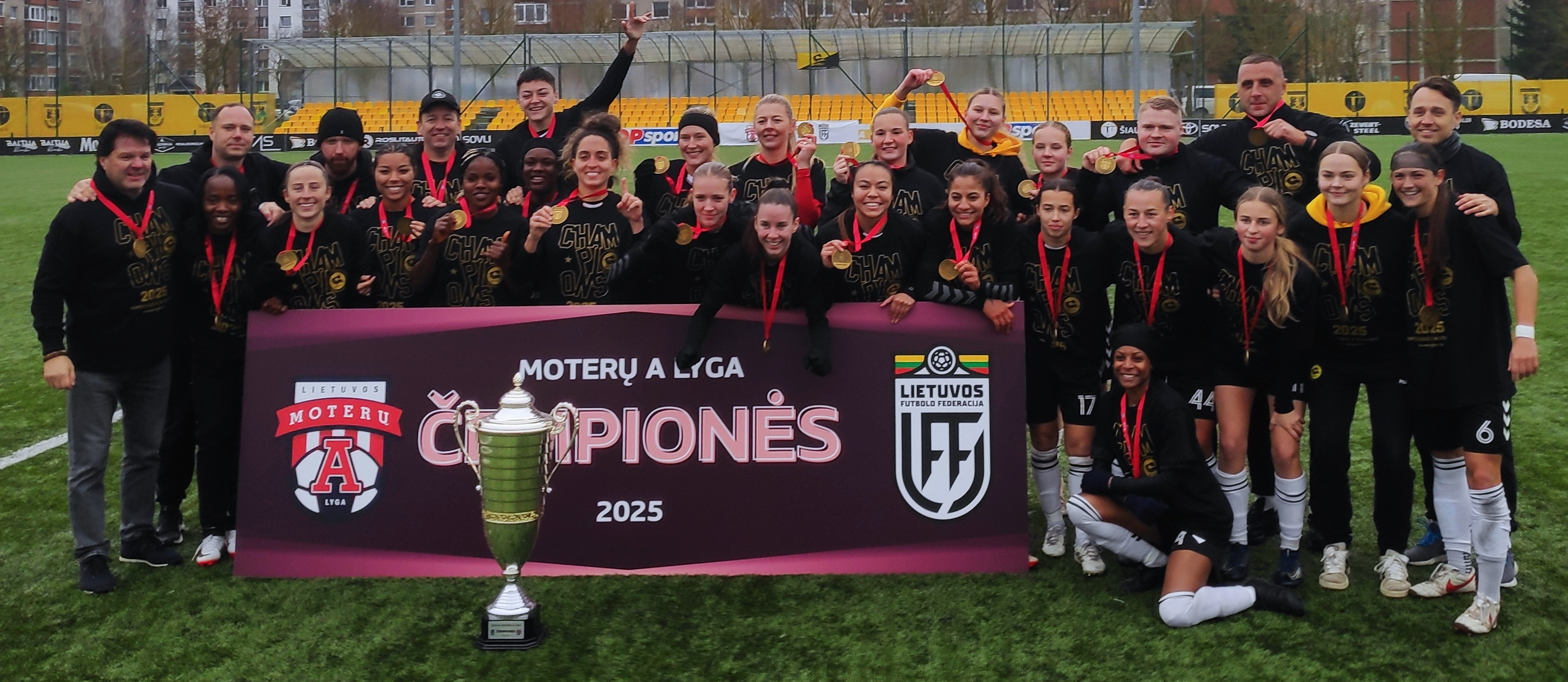
FC Gintra 2025

A list of all champions.

- 1994: Olimpija-Centras Kaunas
- 1994/95: Politechnika Kaunas
- 1995/96: Vilnius FM
- 1996/97: Gabija-Politechnika Kaunas
- 1997/98: Kristina Vilnius
- 1998/99: Politechnika-Sika Kaunas
- 1999: Gintra Šiauliai
- 2000: Gintra Šiauliai
- 2001: Šventupė Ukmergė
- 2002: TexTilitė Ukmergė
- 2003: Gintra-Univesitetas
- 2004: TexTilitė Ukmergė
- 2005: Gintra-Univesitetas
- 2006: Gintra-Univesitetas
- 2007: Gintra-Univesitetas
- 2008: Gintra-Univesitetas
- 2009: Gintra-Univesitetas
- 2010: Gintra-Univesitetas
- 2011: Gintra-Univesitetas
- 2012: Gintra-Univesitetas
- 2013: Gintra-Univesitetas
- 2014: Gintra-Univesitetas
- 2015: Gintra-Univesitetas
- 2016: Gintra-Univesitetas
- 2017: Gintra-Univesitetas
- 2018: Gintra-Univesitetas (17)
- 2019: Gintra-Univesitetas (18)
- 2020: Gintra-Univesitetas (19)
- 2021: Gintra (20)
- 2022: Gintra (21)
- 2023: Gintra (22)
- 2024: Gintra (23)
- 2025: Gintra (24)
- 2026: Gintra (25) -
