= FK Žalgiris (women) =

Lithuanian football club

Žalgiris
- Full name: Vilniaus futbolo klubas "Žalgiris"
- Nickname: Žaliai Balti (The Green Whites)
- Founded: 16 May 1947; 79 years ago
- Ground: LFF Stadium
- Capacity: 5,067
- Coordinates: 54°40′07″N 25°17′39″E
- Chairman: Mindaugas Kasperūnas
- League: Moterų A Lyga
- 2025: A Lyga, 5th of 10
- Website: www.fkzalgiris.lt
Home colours	Away colours	Third colours

Futbolo Klubas Žalgiris is a Lithuanian women's football team based in Vilnius. They play in the Moterų A Lyga (lt. moterų A lyga), the first tier of Lithuanian football.

== History ==
FK Žalgiris (women) was founded in 2010. In early 2010, the women's team was founded. From 2010 season played in Moterų A Lyga. From 2013 played only futsal.

From 2022 started play in LMFA I Lyga. Since 2025 played in Moterų A Lyga.

== Achievements ==
(Lithuania) Moterų A Lyga

- Fourth place (1): 2012

== Recent seasons ==
Season	Level	League	Place	Web	Notes
2025	1.	Moterų A Lyga	5.		
2024	2.	LMFA I Lyga	2.		
2023	2.	LMFA I Lyga	3.		
2022	2.	LMFA I Lyga	6.		

Season	Level	League	Place	Web	Notes
2012	1.	Moterų A Lyga	4.		
2011	1.	Moterų A Lyga	6.		
2010	1.	Moterų A Lyga	6.		

== Kit evolution ==
2024 season Home	2024 season Away	2024 season Goalkeeper

Kit manufacturer – Hummel.

== Current squad ==
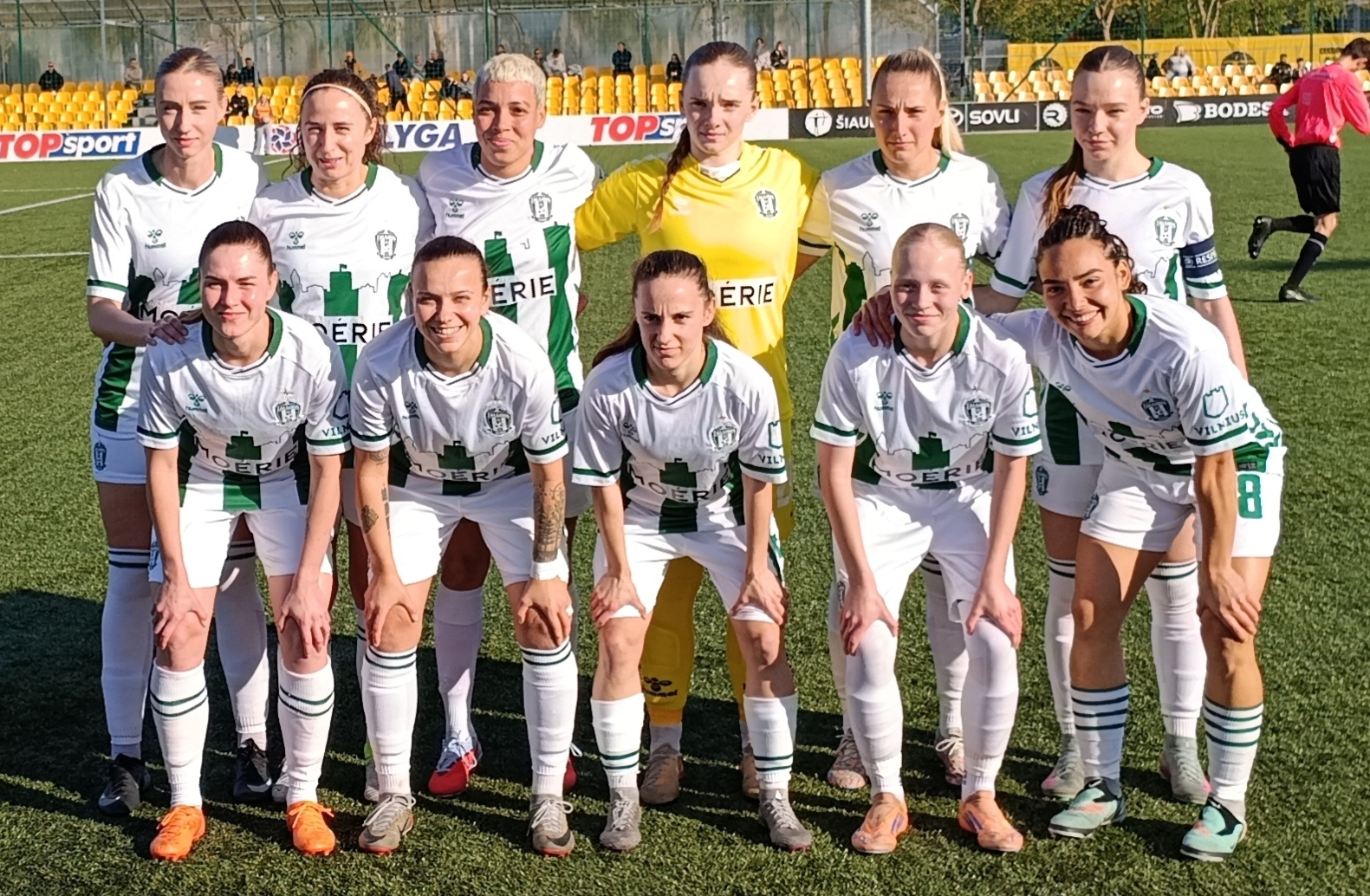
Start up line at 10 May 2026

As of 28 August, 2026

- 1. Sniežana Blaževič (V)
- 2. Agnė Jakiūnaitė
- 7. Elzė Kiškūnaitė
- 9. Milda Ivanciūtė
- 10. Karina Vasilionok (C)
- 16. Gytė Tarasovė (Puodžiukaitė)
- 17. Barbora Valeckaitė
- 19. Marta Lipnickaitė
- 20. Dorotėja Petrauskaitė
- 21. Miana Svatkovskaja
- 22. Alina Neznanova
- 23. Andrėja Baranovskytė
- 29. Kiran Marie Singh
- 30. Julija Melaikytė
- 35. Kornelija Kontrimavičiūtė
- (N) Skaistė Petrauskaitė

== Managers ==
- (Lithuania) Justas Klevinskas (2022–2026)
- (Lithuania) Markas Razmaratas (19 May 2026 – now)

== Notable players ==
Players who have either appeared in at least one match for their respective national teams at any time or received an individual award while at the club. Players whose names are listed in bold represented their countries while playing for FK Žalgiris.

Lithuania

- (Lithuania) **Anika Kyžaitė**
- (Lithuania) **Laura Ruzgutė**
- (Lithuania) **Skaistė Petrauskaitė**
- (Lithuania) **Milda Liužinaitė**
- (Lithuania) **Lolita Žižytė**

== See also ==
- FK Kauno Žalgiris
- FK Kauno Žalgiris (futsal)
- MFA Žalgiris-MRU
