= FA Šiauliai (women) =

- Full name: Football Academy of Šiauliai
- Founded: 1 September 2007
- Ground: Savivaldybė Stadium
- Capacity: 4,000
- Chairman: Reda Mockienė
- Coach: Tatjana Veržbickaja
- League: Moterų A Lyga
- 2025: ▲3rd in LMFA I Lyga (promotion)
Home colours	Away colours

Football Academy of Šiauliai is a Lithuanian football academy from the city of Šiauliai. Simply was known as "Šiauliai". Academy have ladies and man's teams, also child groups and youngsters in U type championships.

FA Šiauliai is a ladies football team, representing Football Academy of Šiauliai. Currently play in top division – Moterų A Lyga.

== History ==
In 2007 was established Football Academy of Šiauliai, when merged Napolis Šiauliai and sport school Klevas.

=== Ladies team ===
Ladies team known as FA Šiualiai, and 2015–2025 as ŠSG-FA Šiauliai.

In 2015 team played in Pirma lyga (2nd tier of women's football). Winners was promoted to top division.

In 2016 was merged team with Sport Center of Akmenė.

From 2017 season play team named ŠSG-FA Šiauliai. (Sports gymnasium of Šiauliai and Football Academy of Šiauliai.)

In 2018 was in 4th position. In 2025 season was third in LMFA I Lyga.

In the 2026 season, the club will start in the Lithuanian Women's A League – Moterų A Lyga.

== Recent seasons ==
Season	Level	League	Place	Web	Notes
2026	1.	Moterų A Lyga	.		
2025	2.	LMFA I Lyga	3.		▲ Promotion to Moterų A Lyga
2024	2.	LMFA I Lyga	3.		
2023	2.	LMFA I Lyga	5.		
2022	2.	LMFA I Lyga	.		
2021	2.	LMFA I Lyga	2.		
2020	1.	Moterų A Lyga	6.		Relegation to LMFA I Lyga
2019	1.	Moterų A Lyga	5.		
2018	1.	Moterų A Lyga	4.		
2017	1.	Moterų A Lyga	5.		
2016	1.	Moterų A Lyga	5.		
2015	2.	LMFA I Lyga	1.		▲ Promotion to Moterų A Lyga

Season	Div.	Tms.	Pos.
2015	D2	13	1
2016	D1	6	5
2017	D1	6	5
2018	D1	5	4
2019	D1	5	4

Key

- Tms. = Number of teams
- Pos. = Position in league

== Current squad ==
As of 24 January, 2026

Note: Flags indicate national team as defined under FIFA eligibility rules; some limited exceptions apply. Players may hold more than one non-FIFA nationality.

No.	Pos.	Nation	Player
1	GK	LTU	Gabija Matuzaitė
3	DF	LTU	Kristina Murinaitė
5	FW	LTU	Simona Bagavičiūtė
6	FW	LTU	Rugilė Butkutė
6	FW	LTU	Justina Lalaitė
8	MF	LTU	Simona Rumčikaitė
9	FW	LTU	Eimantė Žalytė
10	FW	LTU	Einora Galzinaitė
11	DF	LTU	Karolina Zelbaitė

No.	Pos.	Nation	Player
13	FW	LTU	Kamilė Gudelevičiūtė
15	DF	LTU	Gabrielė Vitovskytė
16	FW	LTU	Vismantė Čereškaitė
17	MF	LTU	Kristina Murinaitė
19	DF	LTU	Ema Buivydaitė
20	MF	LTU	Urtė Šmigelskaitė
21	MF	LTU	Gabija Musiejukaitė
22	MF	LTU	Irina Kvasnickaitė
24	MF	LTU	Julija Gudelevičiūtė
20	MF	LTU	Vesta Ilgūnaitė

== Stadium ==
Savivaldybė Stadium is a multi-use stadium in Šiauliai, Lithuania. It is currently used mostly for football matches and is the home stadium of FA Šiauliai (Šiaulių Futbolo Akademija). The stadium holds 4,000 people. The address of the stadium: S. Daukanto g. 23, Šiauliai.

== Famous players ==
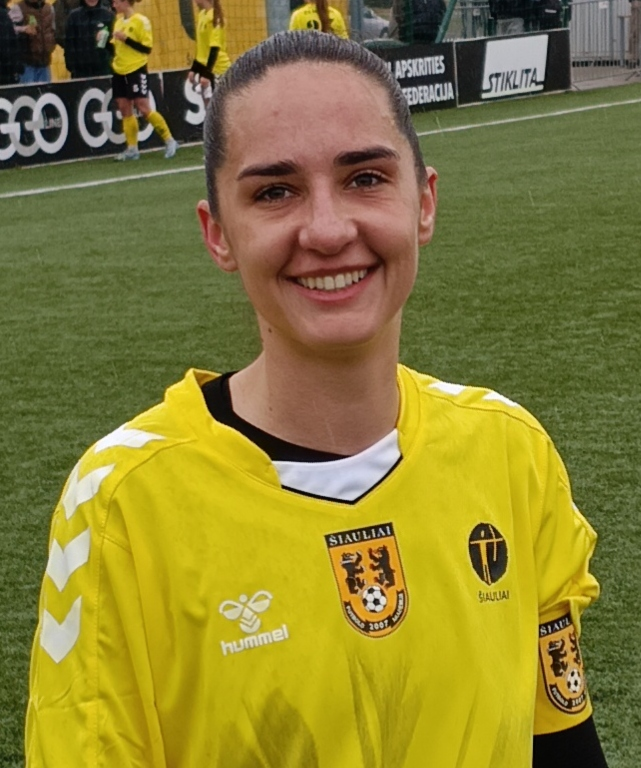
Samanta Karasiovaitė In 2026 became the captain.

Players who have either appeared in at least one match for their respective national teams at any time or received an individual award while at the club. Players whose names are listed in bold represented their countries while playing for FA Šiauliai.

- (Lithuania) Tatjana Veržbickaja (2017, 2018)
- (Lithuania) Samanta Karasiovaitė
- (Lithuania) Greta Lukjančukė (2021, 2026–)
- (Lithuania) **Monika Grikšaitė** (2026–)
- (Lithuania) **Donata Švarcaitė** (2026–)
- (Lithuania) **Viltė Švarcaitė** (20126–)

== Managers ==
- (Lithuania) Vestina Neverdauskaitė (2016)
- (Lithuania) Tatjana Veržbickaja (2016–)
