= Matt Webb =

English footballer

Personal information
- Full name: Matthew Webb
- Date of birth: 4 March 1991 (age 35)
- Place of birth: Exeter, England
- Position: Centre-back

Team information
- Current team: Cullompton Rangers

Youth career
- 2008-2009: Elmore

Senior career*
| Years | Team | Apps | (Gls) |
| 2008–2011 | Elmore | | (1) |
| 2011 | Wellington AFC | | |
| 2011–2012 | Axminster Town | | |
| 2012–2014 | Cullompton Rangers | | |
| 2014–2015 | University of Exeter | | |
| 2015–2020 | Cronies | 166 | (32) |
| 2020–2022 | Ottery St Mary | 77 | (11) |
| 2022– | Sidmouth Town | 100 | (2) |
| 2025– | Cullompton Rangers | 1 | (0) |
| 2026 | University of Exeter | 1 | (0) |

International career^{‡}
| 2024 | Marshall Islands futsal | 4 | (1) |
| 2025– | Marshall Islands | 2 | (0) |
- * Club domestic league appearances and goals ‡ National team caps and goals as of 23:46, 15 May 2026 (UTC)

Matthew "Matt" Webb (born 4 March 1991) is an English association football player and marketing director. He plays as a centre-back for South West Peninsula League Premier Division East Cullompton Rangers and the Marshall Islands national team.

He has served as the marketing and commercial director for the Marshall Islands Soccer Federation (MISF) since 2022.

== Club career ==
Webb began his career at Elmore in 2008 and scored once before leaving in 2011. He also played for a local Exeter club, Cronies, throughout the 2015 to 2020.

He joined Ottery St Mary in 2020 and scored a hat-trick to continue the club's position as league leaders in October 2020. In 2021, he was a member of the team that won the Devon Senior Cup, and was awarded man of the match in the final, following his hat-trick.

In 2022 he joined Sidmouth Town, and he made his debut for Sidmouth Town on 13 August 2022 during a 3–1 win against Plymouth Marjon.

He returned to Cullompton Rangers during the 2025–26 season and made one appearance for the club.

== International career ==
Webb participated in the 2024 Outrigger Challenge Cup, where he scored the Marshall Island's second goal in the final against Kiribati which the Marshall Islands lost 6–2. He returned for the 2025 tournament and played in both matches for the Marshall Islands.

== Marshall Islands Soccer Federation ==
Webb first learned of the MISF in 2022 when he read an article in The Athletic about the organization. He reached out to the chairman of the organization, Shem Livai and offered to help. He joined the organization as the marketing and commercial director. He also helped launch the team's first international kit.

In 2024, he worked with Lloyd Owers to locate a coach for the Marshall Islands women's national futsal team.

He was a contributor in planning the 2025 Outrigger Challenge Cup.

== Career statistics ==
=== International ===
As of match played 16 August 2025.

Appearances and goals by national team and year
| National team | Year | Apps | Goals |
|---|---|---|---|
| Marshall Islands futsal | 2024 | 4 | 1 |
| Total | | 4 | 1 |
| Marshall Islands | 2025 | 2 | 0 |
| Total | | 6 | 1 |

Scores and results list the Marshall Islands' goal tally first, score column indicates score after each Webb goal.

List of international goals scored by Matt Webb
| No. | Date | Venue | Cap | Opponent | Score | Result | Competition | Ref. |
|---|---|---|---|---|---|---|---|---|
| 1. | 24 July 2024 | MIHS Sports Hall, Majuro, Marshall Islands | 4 | Kiribati | 2–1 | 2–6 | 2024 Outrigger Challenge Cup | |
