= Lloyd Owers =

English football coach

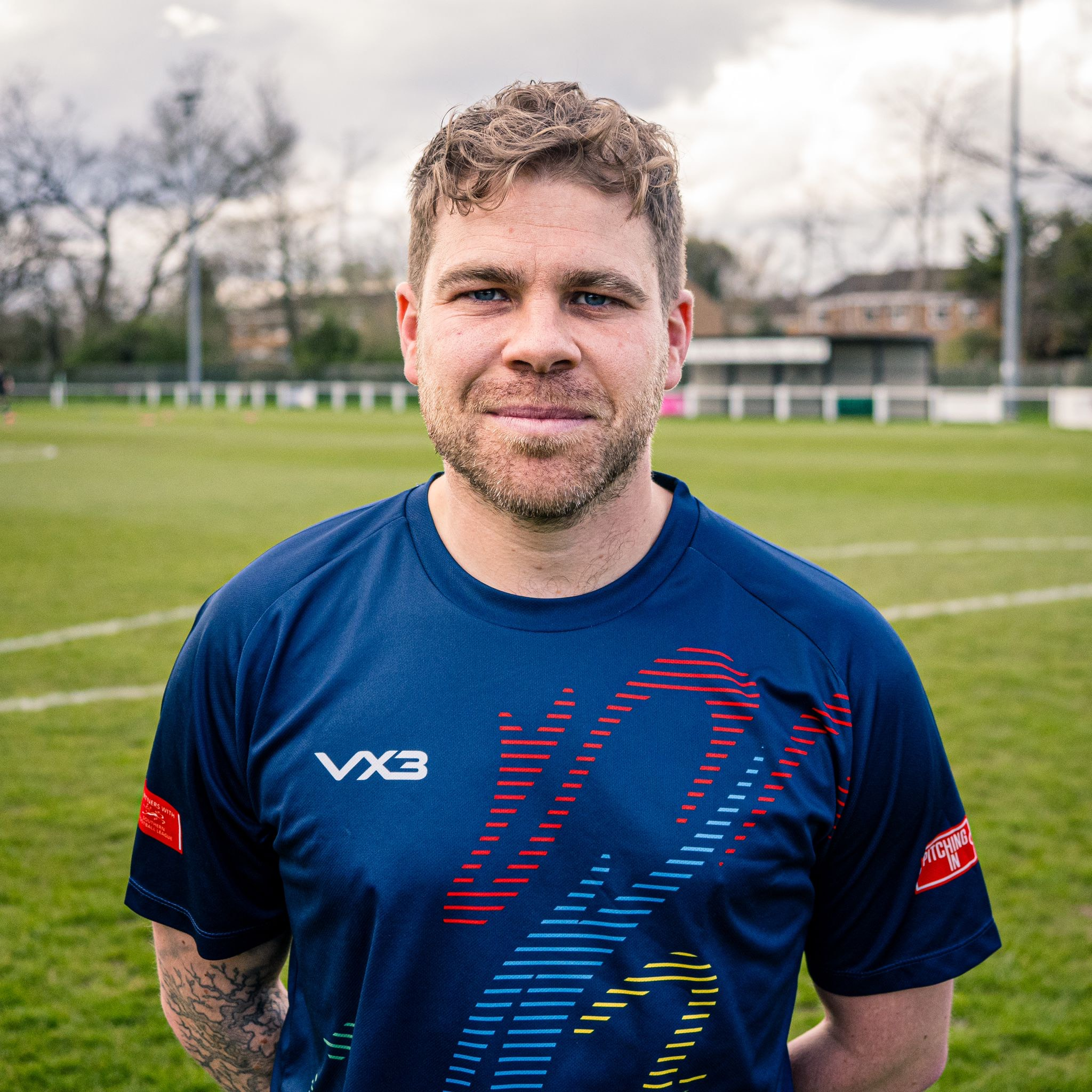

Personal information
- Date of birth: 1989 (age 36–37)

Team information
- Current team: Marshall Islands (manager)

Managerial career
- Years: Team
- 2024: Kidlington (caretaker assistant)
- 2025–: Marshall Islands

Lloyd Owers is an English professional soccer manager who is technical director of the Marshall Islands Soccer Federation, where he also serves as manager of the national team.

He previously served in various coaching roles in England, Canada, Sweden, and the United States.

== Career ==
=== Early career ===
Owers began his football career playing semi-professionally in England until he was 24, also working as a coach since he was 16. He stopped playing to focus on the coaching side of the game, he worked within various levels of coaching. Owers worked with The Football Association full time, as well as scouting roles at Mansfield Town, Colchester United, and Chelmsford City. He coached in Canada, Sweden, and the United States before moving to Oxford, where he worked at Oxford United and retrained as a coaching teacher, delivering Sport Coaching Sciences courses at colleges and universities. Owers would later serve as manager of the Oxford City under-23 team.

=== Kidlington ===
Owers joined Southern League Division One Central club Kidlington as a caretaker assistant manager from March 2024 until the end of the season. The team avoided relegation, after being bottom of the league in March. They finished the 2023–24 season with six wins, one draw, and two losses, finishing 13th.

=== Marshall Islands ===
Owers was appointed as technical director for the Marshall Islands Soccer Federation in December 2022 by the organization's president, Shem Levai. In the summer of 2023, Owers traveled to the islands for the first time and managed the first official football training session for children. During that summer, he managed a training session for men and women interested in the sport, led a coaching workshop, and established his goals for the organization to enter FIFA World Cup qualification and the OFC Men's Nations Cup.

During his visit to the islands, Owers participated in discussions with the Marshall Islands National Olympic Committee which allowed the MISF to become recognized by that committee. He also met with the country's Ministry of Education and helped to incorporate the sport into the national education curriculum.

His future plans for the islands include establishing a national league to be held on both the Majuro Atoll and the Kwajalein Atoll, with the winners of both playing in a final match. With the goal set for the end of the year, the organization was able to found the Marshall Islands Futsal League, and played the first edition of that tournament.

In February 2024, Owers coached the first ever Marshall Islands women's national futsal team training camp, which was held in Springdale, Arkansas.

In summer 2024, he visited Majuro again, continuing to extend both youth and adult coaching sessions, including offering coaching education and other roles. He led the men's national futsal team in the 2024 Outrigger Challenge Cup, contested by Micronesia and Kiribati, winning two games and losing in the final to Kiribati.

Owers was named the manager of the men's national soccer team in July 2025, ahead of the nation's first ever 11-man international matches that will be played in the 2025 Outrigger Challenge Cup.

The Marshall Islands faced two international teams, the Turks and Caicos Islands and the United States Virgin Islands. The team played its first game ever, a 4–0 defeat against the US Virgin Islands, on 14 August 2025. Josiah Blanton scored the Marshall Islands' first goal ever in their second game, a 3–2 loss against Turks and Caicos.

== Coaching consultancy ==
Owers also runs a coaching website which can be used for professional development for coaches as well as securing coaching/technical consultancy services.

== Personal life ==
Owers currently lives in Oxfordshire, England.
