= England 20–0 Latvia =

Association football match

- Event: 2023 FIFA Women's World Cup qualification
| England | Latvia |
| (England) | (Latvia) |
| 20 | 0 |
- Date: 30 November 2021
- Venue: Keepmoat Stadium, Doncaster, England
- Player of the Match: Ellen White (England)
- Referee: Veronika Kovářová (Czech Republic)
- Attendance: 10,402

On 30 November 2021, the England and Latvia national football teams played each other in a European qualifying match for the 2023 FIFA Women's World Cup. The match was played at the Keepmoat Stadium in Doncaster, England. England set a national record for their largest victory in a senior international football match, winning the game 20–0.

The fixture was a multi-record breaking occasion, as four players scored a hat-trick for the first time in an England game and it represented the largest victory for both men's and women's senior England sides, surpassing the women's team's 13–0 win against Hungary in 2005 and the men's 13–0 win against Ireland in 1882. Substitute Alessia Russo's 11-minute hat-trick was the fastest by any England player. In addition, England's Ellen White became the team's all-time top goal scorer during the match, with her hat-trick moving her on to 48 goals, past Kelly Smith's total of 46. The result was only a single goal away from equalling the known record (21–0, set in the 1998 CONCACAF Women's Championship between Canada and Puerto Rico) for any official senior women's international match.

The outcome of the match led to debates about the format of qualification tournaments, with England manager Sarina Wiegman feeling that preliminary rounds should be reintroduced to avoid such unbalanced matches, views shared by the continental footballing body UEFA.

== Background ==
| Pos | Team | Pld | W | D | L | GF | GA | GD | Pts | Qualification |
|---|---|---|---|---|---|---|---|---|---|---|
| 1 | England | 5 | 5 | 0 | 0 | 33 | 0 | +33 | 15 | 2023 FIFA Women's World Cup |
| 2 | Northern Ireland | 6 | 4 | 1 | 1 | 30 | 6 | +24 | 13 | Play-offs |
| 3 | Austria | 5 | 3 | 1 | 1 | 21 | 4 | +17 | 10 | |
| 4 | Luxembourg | 4 | 1 | 0 | 3 | 3 | 21 | −18 | 3 (Note: Ranked on head-to-head points: Luxembourg 3pts; North Macedonia 0pts.) | |
| 5 | North Macedonia (Y) | 6 | 1 | 0 | 5 | 6 | 38 | −32 | 3 | |
| 6 | Latvia (Y) | 4 | 0 | 0 | 4 | 2 | 26 | −24 | 0 | |

Updated to match(es) played on 29 November 2021. Source: UEFA
Rules for classification: Tiebreakers
(Y) Cannot qualify automatically but can still qualify via the play-offs.
Notes:

UEFA Group D qualification table prior to the match.

England entered the match following a 1–0 home win at the Stadium of Light against Austria, marking five wins from five games in which they scored 33 goals and kept clean sheets in all matches. Latvia meanwhile had yet to gain a single point in the group, conceding 26 goals in the process and scoring only two goals. Ten of those conceded goals came in the reverse fixture on 26 October 2021, where goals from White, Bright, Mead, Williamson, Stanway, a brace from Daly and a hat-trick from Toone gave England their second 10–0 win of the qualification campaign. England entered the match eighth in the FIFA Women's World Rankings, with Latvia ranked 94 places lower in 102nd.

Understrength Latvia arrived without several experienced regulars including Miksone, Ročāne, Fedotova and Vaivode; all unavailable for various reasons. It was reported that the scheduling of the match, 21:00 Eastern European Time on a Tuesday evening, made it difficult for the Latvian players who had jobs outside football to get time off work. Meanwhile, team captain and five-time Latvian Footballer of the Year Olga Ševcova was ruled out due to "family circumstances".

Latvia named nine uncapped players in the squad, and several other youngsters with very limited experience at senior international level. To bolster his team, head coach Romāns Kvačovs called up Anna Gornell, an American-born professional with Sundsvalls DFF of the Swedish second tier Elitettan, who was eligible due to her Latvian heritage.

Doncaster Rovers FC, the leaseholders of Keepmoat Stadium, reported an attendance of 12,272. However the early kick-off coincided with rush hour traffic congestion in Doncaster, causing many disappointed supporters to be delayed or absent. The official attendance was announced as 10,402.

== Match details ==
30 November 2021
19:00 GMT

| England | 20–0 | Latvia |
|---|---|---|
| Mead 3', 12', 23'; White 6', 9', 49'; Hemp 18', 44', 76', 88'; Toone 43'; Stanway 52' (pen.); Carter 56'; England 61', 84'; Scott 67'; Russo 71', 81', 82'; Nobbs 80' | Report |

Keepmoat Stadium, Doncaster
Attendance: 10,402
Referee: Veronika Kovářová (Czech Republic)

| England | Latvia |

| GK | 1 | Mary Earps |
| CB | 2 | Millie Bright (c) | (substituted off) 46' |
| CB | 3 | Lotte Wubben-Moy |
| CB | 5 | Alex Greenwood |
| RM | 7 | Beth Mead |
| CM | 8 | Georgia Stanway | (substituted off) 60' |
| CM | 4 | Keira Walsh | (substituted off) 71' |
| CM | 6 | Ella Toone | (substituted off) 46' |
| LM | 11 | Lauren Hemp |
| CF | 10 | Bethany England |
| CF | 9 | Ellen White | (substituted off) 60' |
Substitutes:
| GK | 13 | Sandy MacIver |
| GK | 21 | Hannah Hampton |
| DF | 12 | Niamh Charles |
| DF | 15 | Jess Carter | (substituted on) 46' |
| DF | 16 | Rachel Daly |
| DF | 19 | Demi Stokes |
| MF | 14 | Fran Kirby |
| MF | 18 | Jordan Nobbs | (substituted on) 46' |
| MF | 20 | Jill Scott | (substituted on) 60' |
| MF | 23 | Katie Zelem | (substituted on) 71' |
| FW | 22 | Alessia Russo | (substituted on) 60' |
Manager:
(Netherlands) Sarina Wiegman

| GK | 23 | Laura Siņutkina | | (substituted off) 46' |
| RB | 4 | Alise Gaiķe | | (substituted off) 46' |
| CB | 22 | Sofija Gergeležiu |
| CB | 6 | Arta Luīze Lubiņa |
| LB | 2 | Ligita Tumāne | (yellow card) 52' |
| CM | 10 | Anna Kristīne Gornela |
| CM | 5 | Evelīna Freidenfelde | | (substituted off) 56' |
| CM | 7 | Signija Šenberga | | (substituted off) 67' |
| RF | 8 | Viktorija Zaičikova |
| CF | 13 | Sandra Voitāne (c) |
| LF | 15 | Tatjana Baļičeva | | (substituted off) 85' |
Substitutes:
| GK | 1 | Asnāte Lindermane |
| GK | 12 | Alīna Skļemenova | | (substituted on) 46' |
| DF | 3 | Kristīne Evelīna Lodziņa |
| DF | 17 | Ērika Gricienko | | (substituted on) 85' |
| DF | 19 | Diāna Skribina | | (substituted on) 56' |
| MF | 11 | Taisija Smirnova |
| MF | 14 | Viktorija Vengreviča | | (substituted on) 67' |
| MF | 16 | Selga Vitmore | | (substituted on) 46' |
| MF | 20 | Nikola Brahmane |
| FW | 9 | Liāna Rožaščonoka |
Manager:
Romāns Kvačovs

Player of the Match:
Ellen White (England)

Assistant referees:
Nikol Šafránková (Czech Republic)
Tereza Hessová (Czech Republic)
Fourth official:
Lucie Šulcová (Czech Republic)

=== Statistics ===
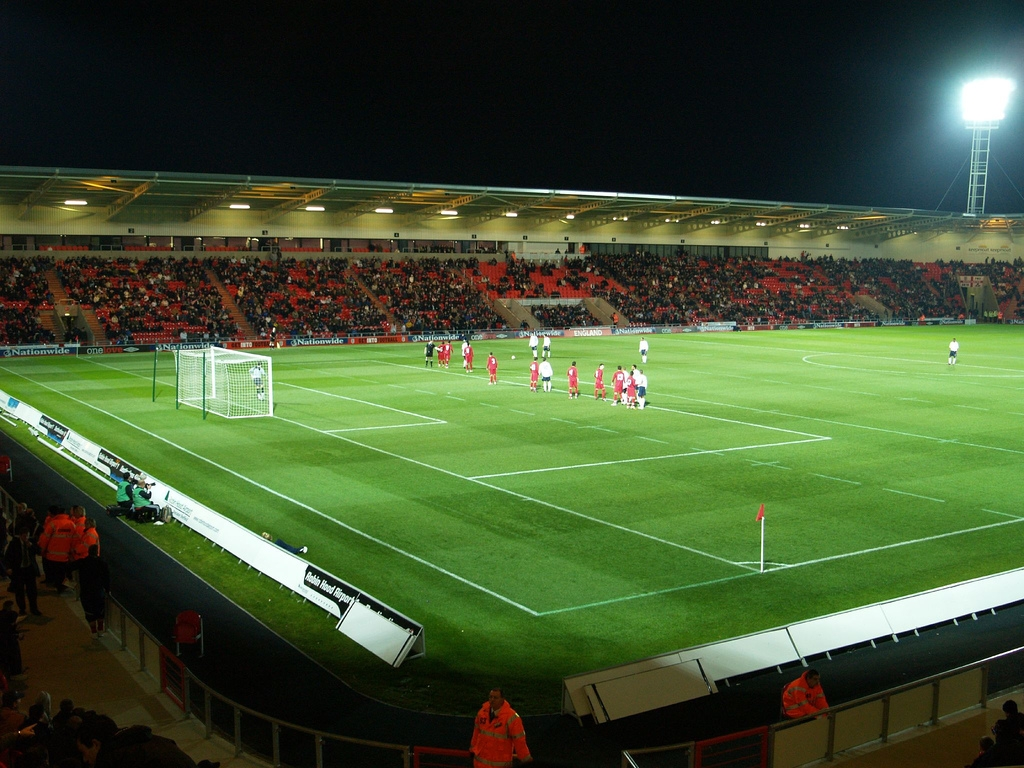
Keepmoat Stadium

| Statistic | England | Latvia |
|---|---|---|
| Goals scored | 20 | 0 |
| Total shots | 64 | 0 |
| Shots on target | 31 | 0 |
| Ball possession | 85.6% | 14.4% |
| Corner kicks | 15 | 0 |
| Fouls conceded | 2 | 2 |
| Yellow cards | 0 | 1 |
| Red cards | 0 | 0 |

Records broken during the game

- Largest victory margin of an England senior side (men's and women's): 20
- Most goals scored by an England senior side (men's and women's): 20
- Most hat-tricks scored by an England senior side (men's and women's): 4
- Fastest England senior hat-trick (men's and women's): Alessia Russo – 11 minutes
- New England women's top goalscorer: Ellen White – 47th and 48th goal (surpassing Kelly Smith)

== Aftermath ==
In his post-match comments, coach Kvačovs praised his players' application in adversity. He emphasised the disparity between his inexperienced amateurs and the full-time professionals of England: "We have never had such an opponent. The English national team is playing really fantastic, but the Latvian national team is currently undergoing a generational change. The average age of the players in the team is 20 years." A parent of one of the Latvia players posted on TheGuardian.com to lament the Latvians' "unnecessary humiliation", remarking: "there is something not quite wholesome about this whole business".

Although she had instructed her players to be "ruthless" in the match, England coach Wiegman admitted afterwards that such unbalanced matches were bad for the overall development of women's football: "Of course you want competitive games and these are not competitive games". She would later, following England's Euro 2022 win and qualifying for the World Cup, say of the Latvia match that changes need to be made in order to develop women's football, that "A big score is sometimes OK but when it happens all the time you have to question if that is good for the team that wins or loses. It should be the exception and not the rule." She did not propose specific changes, admitting it was not her area, but said there were already suggestions at UEFA and with other confederations.

This result and their run of other heavy defeats meant that Latvia dropped 10 places to their lowest-ever position of 112th when the updated FIFA Women's World Rankings were released on 10 December 2021. England remained in eighth place.

England ultimately ended the qualification campaign top of the group, qualifying for the World Cup with one game to spare. The Lionesses won all ten matches, scoring 80 goals without conceding. Latvia finished bottom of six teams with one win and nine defeats, scoring eight goals and conceding 63. Their lone win was a 1–0 victory at home to Luxembourg on 24 June 2022. In total, 19 of the 236 matches played during the group stage of UEFA's 2023 FIFA Women's World Cup qualification ended in double-figure margins of victory, 5 of them England's.

The qualifying tournament for the next international competition, the UEFA Women's Euro 2025, divided the national teams into three leagues, making such mismatched ties less likely.

== See also ==
- List of record scorelines in women's association football
- Category:Record association football wins
- Running up the score
