= Soccer in the Marshall Islands =

- Country: Marshall Islands
- Governing body: Marshall Islands Soccer Federation
- National team: Men's national team

Soccer is a developing sport in the island country of the Marshall Islands. The country is not a member of OFC or FIFA. Soccer is not the main sport on the islands, basketball is the number one sport.

== See also ==
- Marshall Islands Soccer Federation
- Marshall Islands national soccer team
- Marshall Islands national futsal team
- Marshall Islands women's national futsal team
- Marshall Islands Futsal League
- Kwajalein Championship
- Ratak Cup
- Majuro Track and Field Stadium
- ECC Sports Stadium
