= Federated States of Micronesia national futsal team =

Federated States of Micronesia
- Association: FSMFA
- Top scorer: Zack Henly (3)
- Home stadium: Pohnpei State Gymnasium

First international
- Kiribati 15–2 Federated States of Micronesia (Majuro, Marshall Islands; 23 July 2024)

Biggest win
- None

Biggest defeat
- Unofficial; Kiribati "B" 15–1 Federated States of Micronesia (Majuro, Marshall Islands; 24 July 2024); Official; Kiribati 15–2 Federated States of Micronesia (Majuro, Marshall Islands; 23 July 2024)

The Federated States of Micronesia national futsal team represents the Federated States of Micronesia in international futsal. It was formed in 2024 under the auspices of the Federated States of Micronesia Football Association.

== History ==
In 2023, local officials organized the 2023 Micronesian Futsal Cup as the country's first-ever futsal championship. Organizers hoped that introducing the sport to the nation would help reignite its quest for FIFA recognition. Each of the nation's states, Yap, Kosrae, Pohnpei, and Chuuk, sent a representative team to the tournament. Futsal was seen as a good introduction to the sport in FSM because it requires fewer players and is played indoors which makes fields flooded by the nation's heavy rains a non-issue. To fund the tournament, Stingz Sportswear produced replica jersey's for each state team. Because of the success of the fundraiser, the manufacturer announced a replica national team jersey in December 2023.

In June 2024, it was announced that Micronesia would travel to Majuro for a match against the Marshall Islands the following month. It would be the first-ever match for the Micronesia national futsal team and the first-ever match for a Marshall Islands national team in any football code. Shortly thereafter, it was announced that Kiribati would also be participating, forming a triangular tournament called the 2024 Outrigger Challenge Cup.

== All-time fixtures and results ==
23 July 2024 2024 Outrigger Challenge Cup	Kiribati	15–2	Federated States of Micronesia	Majuro, Marshall Islands
	Bangao Bakabane,,,,,,, Bitamatang Keakea, Kaibu Tetabo, Longona Selevale, Riuteri Eeri	Report	Zack Henly; Yopi Laurdine	Stadium: SDA Sports Hall

23 July 2024 2024 Outrigger Challenge Cup	Marshall Islands	8–2	Federated States of Micronesia	Majuro, Marshall Islands
	Folliet Schutz, Cullen Turanga, Kairos Zinihite; Gabino Peter; Pat Phelon; Ming-Che Tsai	Report	Maphrick Ruweday; Own goal	Stadium: SDA Sports Hall

24 July 2024 2024 Outrigger Challenge Cup SF	Marshall Islands	8–3	Federated States of Micronesia	Majuro, Marshall Islands
	Cullen Turange, Kairos Zinihite, Ming-Che Tsai; Folliet Schutz; Baaro Tekarawa; Pat Phelon	Report	Zack Henly, Maphrick Ruweday	Stadium: MIHS Sports Hall

24 July 2024 2024 Outrigger Challenge Cup 3rd	Kiribati “B”	15–1	Federated States of Micronesia	Majuro, Marshall Islands
	Eriati Reebo,, Toom Kiteon, Bauro Martin Jr.,,,, Tetaua Beeni,,,,	Report	Jerold Pluhs	Stadium: MIHS Sports Hall

== All-time record ==
Key

- Pld = Matches played
- W = Matches won
- D = Matches drawn
- L = Matches lost
- GF = Goals for
- GA = Goals against
- GD = Goal differential
- Countries are listed in alphabetical order

As of match played 24 July 2024

Team	Pld	W	D	L	GF	GA	GD	WPCT
Kiribati	1	0	0	1	2	15	−13	0.00
Kiribati "B"	1	0	0	1	1	15	−14	0.00
Marshall Islands	2	0	0	2	5	16	−11	0.00
Total	4	0	0	4	8	46	−38	0.00

Source: Results

== See also ==
- Federated States of Micronesia national football team
