= Justin Walley =

Justin Walley may refer to:

- Justin Walley (footballer) (fl. 2007–2023), English footballer and manager
- Justin Walley (American football) (born 2002), American football cornerback

== See also ==
- Justin Worley (born 1992), American football quarterback
