= Ratak Cup =

- Organising body: MISF
- Founded: 2024
- First season: 2024
- Country: Marshall Islands
- Confederation: MISF
- Number of clubs: 4
- Current champions: Rainok FC (2024)
- Most championships: Rainok FC
- Top goalscorer: Tuitena
- Website: https://rmi.soccer/
- Current: 2024 Ratak Cup

The Ratak Cup is an annual futsal tournament held on the Marshall Islands. The tournament consists of a group stage, with teams advancing to a final and a third place match.

== History ==
The first edition of the tournament began on 30 January 2024, and was played on a basketball court.

== Winners ==
Season	Winner	Runner-up
2024	Rainok FC	Majuro FC

== See also ==
- Marshall Islands Futsal League
- 2024 Outrigger Challenge Cup
- Soccer in the Marshall Islands
- Marshall Islands national futsal team
