= List of professional sports teams in Arkansas =

Arkansas has a rich history of professional sports.

== Active teams ==
Arena football
League	Team	City	Stadium	Capacity
IFL	Arkansas Diamonds	Little Rock	Barton Coliseum	6,300
Baseball
League	Team	City	Stadium	Capacity
TL (AA)	Arkansas Travelers	North Little Rock	Dickey–Stephens Park	7,300
TL (AA)	Northwest Arkansas Naturals	Springdale	Arvest Ballpark	7,305
Basketball
League	Team	City	Stadium	Capacity
TBL	Little Rock Lightning	Little Rock	Hall STEAM Magnet High School	1,700
Soccer
League	Team	City	Stadium	Capacity
USLC	Ozark United FC	Rogers	Ozark United Stadium	5,000
USLS	Ozark United FC	Rogers	Ozark United Stadium	5,000

=== Map of cities with a professional sports team ===
Location with a professional sports team

== See also ==
- Sports in Arkansas
