= MIHS =

MIHS may refer to:

- Madhesh Institute of Health Sciences (MIHS), Janakpurdham, Dhanusha District, Madhesh Province, Nepal
- Manhattan International High School, New York City, United States
- Marshall Islands High School, Majuro, Marshall Islands
- Mercer Island High School, Mercer Island, Washington, United States
- Mercer Island Historical Society, in Mercer Island, Washington, United States
