= Matt Perrella =

American soccer player (born 1991)

Personal information
- Full name: Matthew Perrella
- Date of birth: October 6, 1991 (age 35)
- Place of birth: North Brunswick, New Jersey, United States
- Height: 6 ft 1 in (1.85 m)
- Position: Goalkeeper

Team information
- Current team: Ocean City Nor'easters (head coach); Saint Joseph's Hawks (assistant coach)

Youth career
- New Jersey Copa

College career
Years	Team	Apps	(Gls)
- Rider Broncs

Senior career*
Years	Team	Apps	(Gls)
	Durham City		(0)
2013	Jacksonville Armada	0	(0)
2014	Carolina Railhawks	0	(0)
2015	New Jersey Copa	8	(0)
2015	Syracuse Silver Knights (indoor)	1	(0)
2016	Bethlehem Steel	4	(0)
2017	Jacksonville Armada	0	(0)
2017	Pittsburgh Riverhounds	8	(0)
2018	Atlantic City FC	8	(0)
2018–2019	Harrisburg Heat (indoor)	12	(0)
2019–2020	Utica City (indoor)	1	(0)
2020–2021	Rochester Lancers (indoor)	0	(0)
2021–2022	Milwaukee Wave (indoor)	13	(0)
2022–2023	Florida Tropics (indoor)	0	(0)
Total		55+	(0)

International career^{‡}
2025	Marshall Islands	2	(0)

Managerial career
- 2018: Matabeleland (assistant)
- 2019: Drexel Dragons Women (assistant)
- 2019–2022: Ocean City Nor'easters (assistant)
- 2020: Camden County Cougars (assistant)
- 2021–2022: Camden County Cougars
- 2023–: Ocean City Nor'easters
- 2023–: Saint Joseph's Hawks (assistant)
- * Club domestic league appearances and goals as of January 10, 2024 ‡ National team caps and goals as of August 16, 2025

Matthew "Matt" Perrella (born October 6, 1991) is a professional soccer coach and former player who played as a goalkeeper. He is currently head coach of USL League Two team Ocean City Nor'easters and assistant coach of the Saint Joseph's Hawks men's team in the Atlantic 10 Conference.

== Club career ==
After playing four years of collegiate soccer at Division I Rider University, Perrella went on to get his Master's from Durham University in England. While playing for non-league side Durham City, he was scouted by Newcastle United when Durham played the Newcastle United Reserves and won 2–0 with Perrella keeping a clean sheet in an outstanding performance. This led to trials with Newcastle United in England, Udinese in Italy, LB Châteauroux in France, Daugava Rīga in Latvia and APOEL in Cyprus. In the United States, Perrella spent time with the Carolina Railhawks (now North Carolina FC) and Sporting Kansas City. Perrella's European tour came to an end when he was denied of dual citizenship (US/France) and returned to the US.

In 2013, Perrella signed with Jacksonville Armada FC at the start of the clubs franchise. After making zero appearances in four months, Perrella left for Sporting Kansas City.

In 2016, Perrella signed with Bethlehem Steel FC. Perrella also had previous stints with Carolina Railhawks of the NASL and New Jersey Copa SC of the NPSL On May 1, 2017, Steel FC announced that they and Perrella had mutually parted ways, with Perrella not making an appearance during the 2017 season.

On May 14, 2017, Perella signed with Jacksonville Armada FC on a one match loan to provide goalkeeping cover.

On August 10, 2017, Perella signed with Pittsburgh Riverhounds of the USL on a contract for the remainder of the season. He was intended as a replacement for Keasel Broome, who had to undergo season-ending wrist surgery. Perrella's contract expired at the end of the season and was not renewed by the Riverhounds. He made eight appearances during his short spell with the club.

In 2018 Perella played with NPSL side Atlantic City FC and was the Keystone Conference goalkeeper of the year.

Perella was signed by Utica City FC of the MASL on May 30, 2019.

After appearing in just one game for Utica in the 2019–20 season, Perrella signed with the Rochester Lancers in October 2020.

== International career ==
Perrella was not initially included in the Marshall Islands national team squad announcement for the 2025 Outrigger Challenge Cup, however was included in the later released squad list. While the Marshall Islands squad was selected to follow FIFA rules on eligibility as closely as possible, Perrella has no public connection to the Marshall Islands other than being the national team's goalkeeper coach.

Perrella played in the 4–0 loss against the United States Virgin Islands on August 14, 2025, conceding a penalty.

== Coaching career ==
Perella joined the Drexel Dragons women's team coaching staff on April 12, 2019. He also joined the staff of USL League Two team Ocean City Nor'easters in the summer of 2019.

Perrella was named head coach of the Camden County Cougars men's team in July 2021.

In July 2023, Perrella was promoted to head coach for the Ocean City Nor'easters.

Perrella also joined the staff of the Saint Joseph's Hawks men's team in 2023.

== Career statistics ==
=== International ===
As of match played August 16, 2025

Appearances and goals by national team and year
National team	Year	Apps	Goals
Marshall Islands	2025	2	0
Total		2	0
