= 2024 Ratak Cup =

Tournament details
- Country: Marshall Islands
- Dates: 30 January—3 February
- Teams: 4

Final positions
- Champions: Rainok FC (1st title)
- Runners-up: Majuro FC
- Third place: Majuro All Stars
- Fourth place: Delap FC

Tournament statistics
- Matches played: 14
- Goals scored: 32 (2.29 per match)
- Top goal scorer(s): Tuitena

Awards
- Player of the tournament: Kairos
- All statistics correct as of 3 February 2024.

The 2024 Ratak Cup, also known as the Unrepresented Sports Ratak Cup due to sponsorship reasons, was the first edition of the Ratak Cup that is planned to take place on the Marshall Islands annually. It is a futsal competition and took place from 30 January to 3 February.

The tournament took place during the visit of Justin Walley, communications director and coaching staff for the Marshall Islands Soccer Federation. The final was won by Rainok FC, with a 2–0 win over Majuro FC.

== Teams ==
Below is the list of four teams participating in the tournament.

- Delap FC
- Majuro All Stars
- Majuro FC
- Rainok FC

== Squads ==
Each team had a squad of at least six players.

Rainok FC	Majuro All Stars	Majuro FC	Delap FC
Oscar	Kairos	Cullen	Soji
Gabino	Tuitena	Tony	Non
Inni	David	Sajid	Reggie
Ming	JoJo	Junior	Charles
Immanuel	Divine Waiti	Watanabe	John
Rudy	Justin Walley	Viktor	Nevan
Viktor	'Tuvalu' Faiana	—	Sam

== Group stage ==
Pos	Team	Pld	W	D	L	GF	GA	GD	Pts	Qualification
1	Rainok FC	6	3	1	2	5	4	+1	10	Final
2	Majuro FC	6	2	2	2	7	5	+2	8	Final
3	Majuro All Stars	6	2	2	2	5	6	−1	8	
4	Delap FC	6	2	1	3	8	10	−2	7	

Source: MISF
30 January 2024

Rainok FC	1–0	Majuro FC

30 January 2024

Majuro All Stars	1–2	Delap FC

2024

Rainok FC	1–0	Delap FC

2024

Majuro All Stars	0–2	Majuro FC

2024

Delap FC	1–1	Majuro FC

2024

Rainok FC	0–1	Majuro All Stars

2024

Majuro All Stars	2–1	Delap FC

2024

Rainok FC	1–0	Majuro FC

2024

Majuro All Stars	1–1	Majuro FC

2024

Rainok FC	2–3	Delap FC

2024

Rainok FC	0–0	Majuro All Stars

2024

Majuro FC	3–1	Delap FC

== Third place match ==
3 February 2024

Majuro All Stars	4–1	Delap FC

== Final ==
3 February 2024

Rainok FC	2–0	Majuro FC

== Sponsorship ==
The tournament was sponsored by a number of organizations listed below.

- Diego Magazine
- Trasferta Magazine
- Total Football Analysis
- The Gaffer Magazine
- Unrepresented Sports (title sponsor)

== Goalscorers ==
There have been 32 goals scored in 14 matches, for an average of 2.29 goals per match (as of 3 February 2024).

7 goals

- Tuitena (Majuro All Stars)

6 goals

- John (Delap FC)

5 goals

- Kairos (Majuro FC)

3 goals

- Ming (Rainok FC)

2 goals

- Soji (Delap FC)
- Gabino (Rainok FC)
