= Selga Vitmore =

Latvian footballer

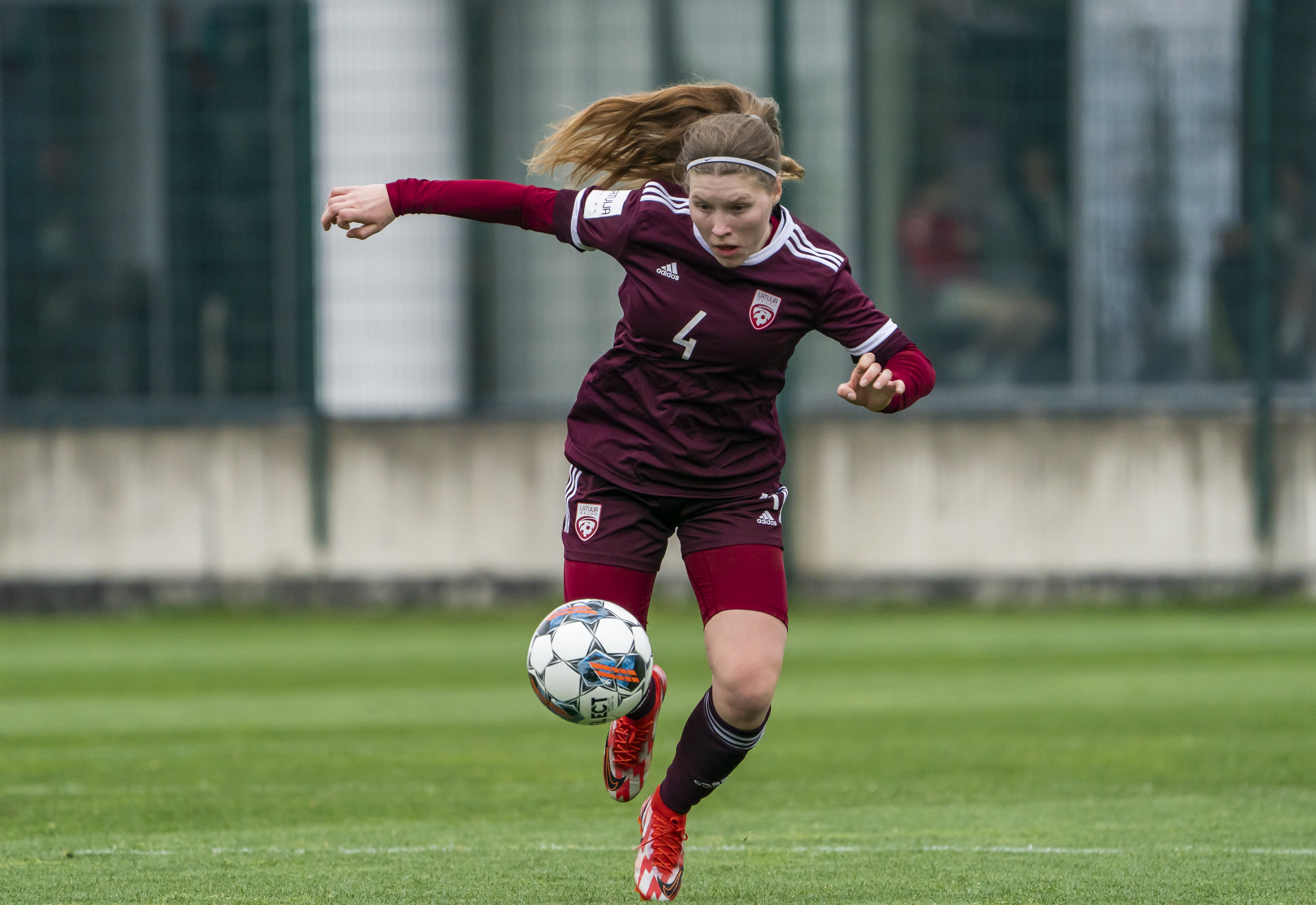

Personal information
- Full name: Selga Penelope Vitmore
- Date of birth: 10 March 2002 (age 24)
- Place of birth: Rīga, Latvia
- Position: Midfielder

Team information
- Current team: SK Super Nova

Youth career
- Riga United FC Ladies

Senior career*
Years	Team	Apps	(Gls)
2016-2019	Riga United FC Ladies	12	(1)
2019	FK Dinamo Rīga	2	(0)
2021-	SK Super Nova	41	(3)

International career^{‡}
2017–2018	Latvia U-17	12	(0)
2019	Latvia U-19	7	(0)
2021–	Latvia	10	(0)
- * Club domestic league appearances and goals ‡ National team caps and goals as of 13:39, 16 July 2024 (UTC)

Selga Penelope Vitmore (born 10 March 2002) is a Latvian footballer who plays as a midfielder for SK Super Nova and the Latvia national team.

== International career ==
Vitmore made her debut for the Latvia national team on 30 November 2021, coming on as a substitute for her club teammate Alise Gaiķe against England.
