= Aaron Anitok-Brokken =

Marshallese soccer player (born 2007)

Personal information
- Full name: Aaron Anitok-Brokken
- Date of birth: 14 August 2007 (age 19)
- Place of birth: Salem, Oregon, United States
- Height: 1.72 m (5 ft 8 in)
- Position: Forward

Team information
- Current team: Clark Penguins
- Number: 29

College career
Years	Team	Apps	(Gls)
2025–	Clark Penguins	12	(1)

International career^{‡}
2025	Marshall Islands	2	(1)
- ‡ National team caps and goals as of 8 April 2026

Aaron Anitok-Brokken (born 14 August 2007) is a Marshallese footballer who plays as a forward for Clark Penguins.

== Club career ==
He scored on his debut for Clark Penguins during the 2–2 draw against Highline on 30 August 2025.

== International career ==
He represented the Marshall Islands in the 2025 Outrigger Challenge Cup, featuring in their first ever match, a 4–0 defeat to the US Virgin Islands, but converting a penalty against the Turks and Caicos Islands, making him the joint top scorer of the Marshall Islands, and the first Marshallese player to score for the Marshall Islands, as Josiah Blanton is not from the nation.

In an interview, Anitok-Brokken expressed his pride representing the Marshall Islands.

== Career statistics ==
=== International ===
As of match played 16 August 2025

Appearances and goals by national team and year
National team	Year	Apps	Goals
Marshall Islands	2025	2	1
Total		2	1

Scores and results list the Marshall Islands' goal tally first, score column indicates score after each Anitok-Brokken goal.

List of international goals scored by Aaron Anitok-Brokken
No.	Date	Venue	Opponent	Score	Result	Competition	Ref.
1	16 August 2025	Jarrell Williams Bulldog Stadium, Springdale, United States	Turks and Caicos Islands	2–3	2–3	2025 Outrigger Challenge Cup	
