= Seth Sidle =

Marshallese soccer player (born 2002)

Personal information
- Date of birth: 4 December 2002 (age 23)
- Place of birth: Hawaii, United States
- Positions: Defender; midfielder

Team information
- Current team: YorkPA FC
- Number: 20

Youth career
- FC Ballyhoo

College career
Years	Team	Apps	(Gls)
2021–2025	Susquehanna River Hawks	17	(1)

Senior career*
Years	Team	Apps	(Gls)
2026–	YorkPA FC		

International career^{‡}
2025–	Marshall Islands	2	(0)
- * Club domestic league appearances and goals ‡ National team caps and goals as of 16 August 2025

Seth Sidle (born 4 December 2002) is a soccer player who plays as a defender or midfielder for YorkPA FC. Born in the United States, he is a Marshall Islands international.

== Early life ==
Sidle was born on 4 December 2002. Born in Hawaii, United States, he is the younger brother of Sam. A native of York County, Pennsylvania, United States, he attended Northeastern High School in the United States.

== Club career ==
As a youth player, Sidle joined the youth academy of American side FC Ballyhoo. Following his stint there, Sidle signed for American side YorkPA FC ahead of the 2026 season.

== International career ==
Sidle is a Marshall Islands international. During the summer of 2025, he played for the Marshall Islands national soccer team at the 2025 Outrigger Challenge Cup.
