= Latvian Footballer of the Year =

Football award

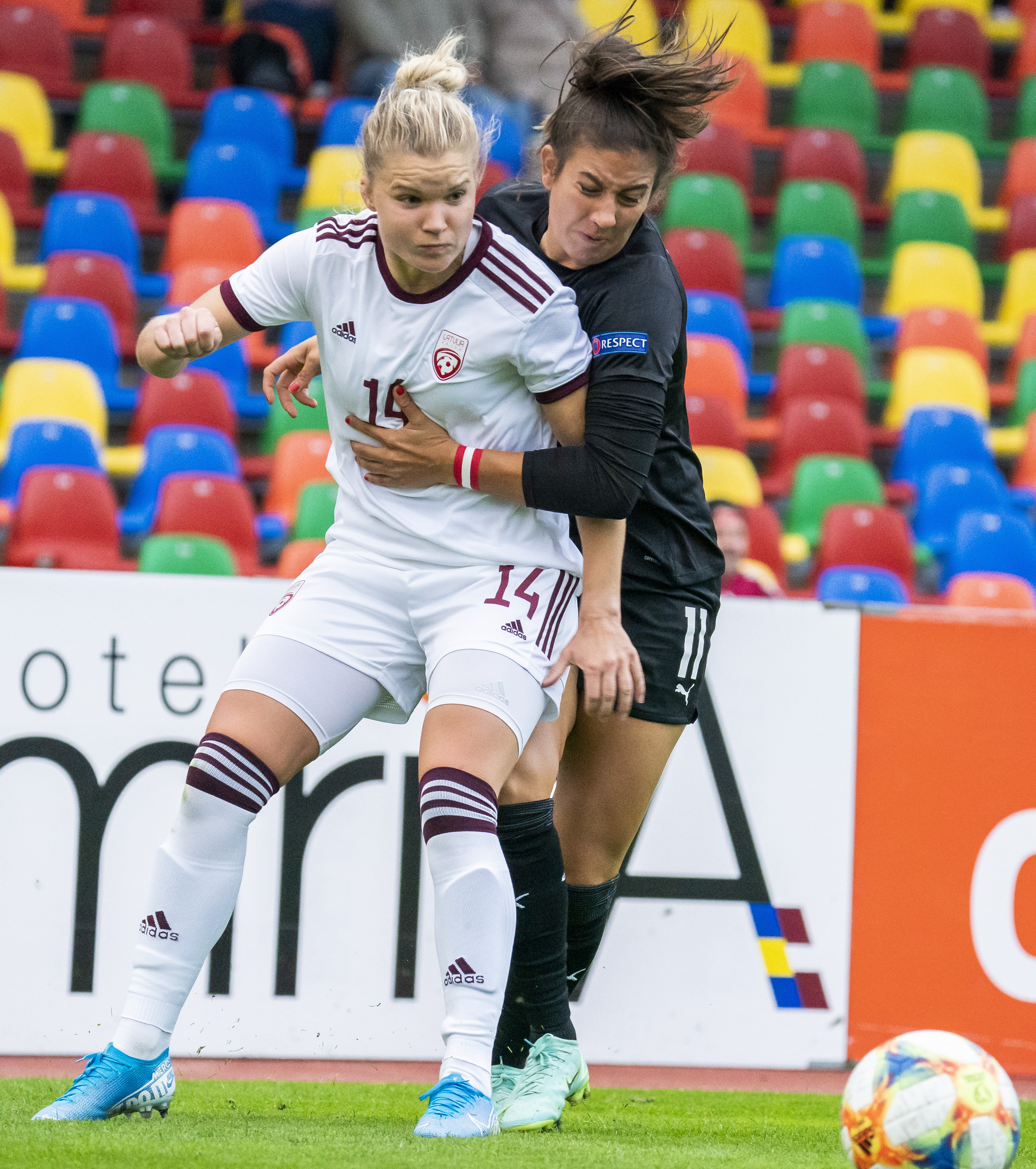
Olga Ševcova (in white uniform), record winner of the award.

Latvian Footballer of the Year is an association football award for Latvia. It is held by the Latvian Football Federation. Since 2005, there has also been an award for the top female player.

== Men's winners ==
Year	Player	Club
1992	Ainārs Linards	(Sweden) Örebro SK
1993	Not specified	
1994	Vladimirs Babičevs	(Latvia) Skonto FC
1995	Vitālijs Astafjevs	(Latvia) Skonto FC
1996	Vitālijs Astafjevs	Austria Vienna
1997	Jurijs Ševļakovs	(Latvia) Skonto FC
1998	Mihails Zemļinskis	(Israel) Hapoel Kfar Saba
1999	Marians Pahars	(England) Southampton
2000	Marians Pahars	(England) Southampton
2001	Marians Pahars	(England) Southampton
2002	Juris Laizāns	(Russia) CSKA Moscow
2003	Māris Verpakovskis	(Ukraine) Dynamo Kyiv
2004	Māris Verpakovskis	(Ukraine) Dynamo Kyiv
2005	Igors Stepanovs	(Switzerland) Grasshopper
2006	Aleksandrs Koliņko	(Russia) Rubin Kazan
2007	Vitālijs Astafjevs	(Latvia) Skonto FC
2008	Andris Vaņins	(Latvia) FK Ventspils
2009	Kaspars Gorkšs	(England) Queens Park Rangers
2010	Kaspars Gorkšs	(England) Queens Park Rangers
2011	Aleksandrs Cauņa	(Russia) CSKA Moscow
2012	Aleksandrs Cauņa	(Russia) CSKA Moscow
2013	Andris Vaņins	(Switzerland) FC Sion
2014	Aleksandrs Koliņko	(Russia) Baltika Kaliningrad
2015	Andris Vaņins	(Switzerland) FC Sion
2016	Andris Vaņins	(Switzerland) FC Sion
2017	Andris Vaņins	(Switzerland) FC Zürich
2018	Dāvis Ikaunieks	(Czech Republic) FK Jablonec
2019	Pāvels Šteinbors	(Poland) Arka Gdynia
2020	Pāvels Šteinbors	(Poland) Arka Gdynia
2021	Vladislavs Gutkovskis	(Poland) Raków
2022	Vladislavs Gutkovskis	(Poland) Raków
2023	Jānis Ikaunieks	(Latvia) FK RFS
2024	Jānis Ikaunieks	(Latvia) FK RFS
2025	Andrejs Cigaņiks	(Switzerland) FC Luzern

== Women's winners ==
Year	Player	Club
2005	Sintija Grāviņa-Grēve	(Latvia) Saldus FK
2006	Guna Āboliņa	(Latvia) Lutrini
2007	Guna Āboliņa	(Latvia) Lutrini
2008	Ieva Bidermane	(Latvia) Skonto/Tseriba
2009	Sintija Greijere	(Latvia) FK Liepājas Metalurgs
2010	Anna Propošina	(Latvia) "Metallurgs" Liepaja
2011	Olga Ivanova	(Estonia) Pärnu JK
2012	Guna Āboliņa	(Latvia) Skonto/Tseriba
2013	Olga Ivanova	(Estonia) Pärnu JK
2014	Olga Ivanova	(Estonia) Pärnu JK
2015	Ieva Bidermane	(Latvia) Riga United
2016	Marija Ibragimova	(Latvia) Riga Football School
2017	Olga Ševcova	(Latvia) Rīgas FS
2018	Olga Ševcova	(Latvia) Rīgas FS
2019	Olga Ševcova	(Latvia) FK Dinamo Rīga
2020	Sandra Voitāne	(Germany) SV Meppen
2021	Sandra Voitāne	(Austria) FC Wacker Innsbruck
2022	Olga Ševcova	(Iceland) ÍBV
2023	Olga Ševcova	(Iceland) ÍBV
2024	Karlīna Miksone	(Poland) Czarni Sosnowiec
2025	Karlīna Miksone	(Poland) Czarni Sosnowiec

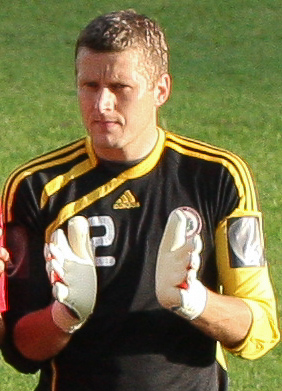
Andris Vaņins has won the award five times; behind Olga Ševcova with seven wins.

== See also ==
- List of sports awards honoring women
