= Kwajalein Championship =

Marshallese football league

- Founded: 1967; 59 years ago
- Folded: 2023; 3 years ago
- Country: Marshall Islands
- Confederation: OFC
- Most championships: Spartans I (12 titles)

The Kwajalein Championship was the national soccer league of the Marshall Islands from 1967 to 2023. All matches for the unofficial tournament were held at Brandon Field on the island of Kwajalein. It was succeeded by the Marshall Islands Soccer League beginning in 2026.

== Champions ==
=== Performance by club ===
The following table lists all Kwajalein Championship winners.

Rank	Team	Winners	Years
1	Spartans I	12	1972–73, 1974, 1974–75, 1975–76, 1976–77, 1978, 1979, 1981, 1995, 2001, 2006, 2022
2	FC Swell	5	2009, 2011, 2013, 2015, 2021
3	Fish	2	2004, 2005
3	Kobeer	2	1999, (Note: Shared title) 2002
3	Kwajalein FC	2	2014, 2016
3	Locals	2	1999, 2000
3	Nutmeg...Sub!	2	2017, 2018
3	Shamrock Rovers	2	1967, 1969–70
4	Crush	1	2012
4	Double X	1	1980
4	Ebeye Blues	1	1969
4	Fijian Connection	1	2003
4	Matadors Roi Namur	1	1970–71
4	Spartans Varsity	1	2010
Unknown winners		23	1967–68, 1971–72, 1982, 1983, 1984, 1985, 1986, 1987, 1988, 1989, 1990, 1991, 1992, 1993, 1994, 1996, 1997, 1998, 2007, 2008, 2019, 2020, 2023

== See also ==
- Marshall Islands Soccer Federation
