= Jurijs Ševļakovs =

Soviet and Latvian footballer

Personal information
- Date of birth: 24 January 1959 (age 67)
- Place of birth: Moscow, Soviet Union
- Height: 1.81 m (5 ft 11 in)
- Position: Defender

Youth career
- 197?–1980: CSKA Moscow

Senior career*
Years	Team	Apps	(Gls)
1981	Cement Novorossiysk	34	(0)
1982–1990	Daugava Rīga	338	(9)
1991	Ilves Tampere	21	(1)
1992	Vantaan Pallo-70	22	(3)
1993	Ilves Tampere	14	(0)
1994–1997	Skonto Rīga	85	(6)

International career^{‡}
1992–1997	Latvia	44	(2)
- * Club domestic league appearances and goals as of 7 January 2008 ‡ National team caps and goals as of 7 January 2008

Jurijs Ševļakovs (born 24 January 1959 in Moscow, Soviet Union) is a former Latvian football defender, now a football manager.

== Club playing career ==
His career as a player began in CSKA Moscow where he played a couple of games in the reserves team but could not achieve more and left Moscow. In 1981, he joined his first senior team - Cement Novorossiysk. After one year in Novorossiysk Ševļakovs moved to FK Daugava Rīga where he played until 1990, making more than 330 appearances for the club. In 1991, he went to his first team outside the former USSR - Ilves in Finland. After three seasons in Finland he returned to Latvia and joined the strongest Latvian team at the time - FC Skonto and won the gold of Virslīga four times in a row. He was selected the best Latvian footballer of the year in 1997.

== National team playing career ==
When in 1992 Latvia national football team started again Ševļakovs became one of the key players in it. Until the very end of his career Ševļakovs was the captain of the national team. One of his best games for Latvia came in a 2–0 home victory against Belarus in 1997 when Ševļakovs scored both goals for Latvia. Despite his senior age for high level football, Ševļakovs made 44 appearances for Latvia and was considered one of the country's most reliable defenders until the end of his playing career.

== Coaching career ==
After finishing his career as player Ševļakovs instantly moved to coaching. His first squad was the reserves of FC Skonto, later he became assistant manager of Latvia U21 under Jurijs Andrejevs, after Andrejevs was elected Latvia national football team manager, Ševļakovs succeeded him as manager of U21. Currently Ševļakovs is assistant manager of FC Skonto and Latvia national team.

== Honours ==
- Latvian Footballer of the Year - 1997
- Champion of Latvia - 4 (1994-1997)
- Latvian Cup winner - 2 (1995, 1997)
- Best defender in the Latvian championship - 3 (1994-1996)
