= Marshall Islands women's national futsal team =

Marshall Islands
- Shirt badge/Association crest
- Association: Marshall Islands Soccer Federation
- Home stadium: ECC Sports Stadium
- FIFA code: MHL
Home colours	Away colours

The Marshall Islands women's national futsal team represents the Marshall Islands in international futsal competitions and is controlled by the Marshall Islands Soccer Federation.

== History ==
The first training camp was held in Springdale, Arkansas during March 2024. Six players attended, and the sessions were directed by technical director Lloyd Owers.

== Squad (2024) ==
No.	Pos.	Player	Date of birth (age)	Caps	Goals	Club
1	GK	Starnie Leas		0	0	(United States) Har-Ber High School
2		Tana Luther		0	0	Unattached
4		Em Miller		0	0	Unattached
7		Estera Kanono		0	0	Unattached
9	DF	Mari Sallee		0	0	Beach FC
13	FW	Oneal Hunt		0	0	(United States) Arroyo Grande High School

== See also ==
- Marshall Islands national futsal team
- Soccer in the Marshall Islands
