= Majuro Track and Field Stadium =

Sports venue in Majuro, Marshall Islands

- Interactive map of Majuro Track and Field Stadium
- Location: Jenrok Village, Majuro, Marshall Islands
- Coordinates: 7.1112°N 171.3697°E
- Capacity: 2,000
- Surface: Artificial turf
- Scoreboard: Yes

Construction
- Groundbreaking: May 2019
- Opened: 2024
- Cost: $6 million (USD)
- General contractor: Pacific International Inc

Tenants
- Marshall Islands National Olympic Committee; Marshall Islands national soccer team

The Majuro Track and Field Stadium is a 2,000-capacity multi-purpose stadium in Majuro, the capital of the Marshall Islands. It is mostly used for track and field and soccer events. The structure also serves as a large seawall in the densely populated part of Majuro which has become inundated with seawater through the effects of climate change, particularly during king tide.

== History ==
The stadium was originally designed as a venue for the Micronesian Games. After negotiations with local landowners, a groundbreaking ceremony was held in early May 2019. Pacific International, Inc was selected as contractor with a projected cost of $6 million (USD). Construction was anticipated to take 18 to 20 months to complete. Funding assistance for the project was provided by the government of Taiwan.

By July 2020 the land reclamation project on the 10-acre piece of property was nearly complete, with an anticipated finish of mid to late 2021. However, at that time it was announced that the tournament could be delayed to 2023 because of the ongoing COVID-19 pandemic. In November 2021 it was confirmed that the tournament would be delayed, partially because of the effects of the pandemic on border controls which affected the availability of specialized contractors and shipping of necessary construction materials, supplies, and equipment needed to complete the facility. By November 2021 reclamation projects were complete and structural construction had advanced.

In April 2022 Marshall Islanders were invited to the stadium for the first time for Majuro’s 78th Liberation Day celebration. The athletic track and separate baseball facility were not yet completed. In January 2023 the president of the Marshall Islands Soccer Federation stated that stadium construction was ahead of schedule for its official opening. He also stated that the stadium was a vital piece of infrastructure for the association’s plans to join the Oceania Football Confederation and FIFA.

== See also ==
- 2024 Micronesian Games
- ECC Sports Stadium
- Soccer in the Marshall Islands
