= List of record scorelines in women's association football =

Women's association football has seen several scorelines of high disparity, with one team vastly outscoring the other. This may also be simply termed the "highest score" or "biggest win"s in women's football. Many of these have occurred in early stages of continental tournaments; in women's football there are high-level national teams spread across the globe, making difference in ability compared to other nations in the same continental association possible, though rarer in the 21st century.

== International games ==
Team A	Score	Team B	Date	Competition
Japan	21–0	Guam	5 December 1997	1997 AFC Women's Championship group stage
Canada	21–0	Puerto Rico	28 August 1998	1998 CONCACAF Women's Championship group stage
New Zealand	21–0	Samoa	9 October 1998	1998 OFC Women's Championship group stage
Australia	21–0	American Samoa	9 October 1998	1998 OFC Women's Championship group stage
Haiti	21–0	British Virgin Islands	9 April 2022	2022 CONCACAF W Championship qualification group stage
England	20–0	Latvia	30 November 2021	2023 FIFA Women's World Cup UEFA qualification groups
Nicaragua	19–0	Turks and Caicos Islands	22 February 2022	2022 CONCACAF W Championship qualification group stage
Belgium	19–0	Armenia	25 November 2021	2023 FIFA Women's World Cup UEFA qualification groups
Australia	18–0	Indonesia	21 January 2022	2022 AFC Women's Asian Cup group stage
Australia	17–0	Fiji	15 October 1998	1998 OFC Women's Championship semi-final
Germany	17–0	Kazakhstan	19 November 2011	2013 UEFA Women's Euro qualifying
Canada	14–0	Martinique	30 August 1998	1998 CONCACAF Women's Championship group stage
New Zealand	14–0	Fiji	11 October 1998	1998 OFC Women's Championship group stage
Cuba	14–0	British Virgin Islands	19 February 2022	2022 CONCACAF W Championship qualification group stage

== Club games ==
Only featuring the single highest scoreline for and against any individual team; the list does not intend to denigrate or celebrate individual teams.

Team A	Score	Team B	Date	Notes
(England) Willenhall Town Ladies	57–0	(England) Burton Brewers Ladies	4 March 2001	West Midlands Sunday League Division One North, the fifth-tier league was the lowest in the region at the time
(England) Doncaster Rovers Belles	46–0	(England) County Canaries	mid-1990s	Yorkshire Cup
(Catalonia) CF Barcelona	30–0	(Catalonia) Bemen 3	7 December 1985	Lliga catalana
(Catalonia) FC Barcelona C	30–0	(Catalonia) Cerdanyola del Vallès FC	22 March 2025	Preferente Catalana
