= Marshall Islands Futsal League =

- Organising body: MISF
- Founded: 2023
- First season: 2023
- Country: Marshall Islands
- Confederation: MISF
- Number of clubs: 4
- Current champions: Iakwe Football Club (1)
- Most championships: Iakwe Football Club
- Website: https://rmi.soccer/
- Current: 2023 Marshall Islands Futsal League

The Marshall Islands Futsal League is the top-level national futsal competition organized by the Marshall Islands Soccer Federation. The league currently consists of four teams, each named by users on Twitter.

The league held its first ever edition in 2023.

== Champions ==
Season	Winner	Runner-up
2023	Iakwe Football Club	Jabro FC

== 2023 season ==
=== Teams ===
This is the list of confirmed teams.

- Kajur United
- Jabro FC
- Majuro United
- Iakwe Football Club

=== Standings ===
Pos	Team	Pld	W	D	L	GF	GA	GD	Pts	Result
1	Iakwe Football Club	3	3	0	0	14	4	+10	9	Champion
2	Jabro FC	3	2	0	1	18	7	+11	6	
3	Kajur United (Note: Kajur United was referred to as Kajur FC in the first match report.)	3	1	0	2	9	8	+1	3	
4	Majuro United	3	0	0	3	5	27	−22	0	

Source: MISF RSSSF

=== Matches ===
August 2023

Majuro United	2–14	Jabro FC
Kairus 1'; Cornel 8'	Report	Dako 1'; Wayne 3'; Junior 5', 5', 7', 9', 16'; John 9', 12', 15'; Gabino 11', 15', 15', 16'

August 2023

Iakwe FC	5–0	Kajur FC
Cullen 5', 7', 7', 8'; Paul Mark 7'	Report

26 August 2023

Iakwe FC	4–2	Majuro United
Paul 5', 11'; Cullen 7'; Dala 12'	Report	Cornel 6'; Kairos 8'

26 August 2023

Kajur United	0–2	Jabro FC
	Report	Wayne 8'; Dako 15'

9 September 2023

Jabro FC	2–5	Iakwe FC
Tuetena,	Report	Reggie; Cullen,, Mohammad

9 September 2023

Majuro United	3–9	Kajur United
Luthando; Kairus; Kornel	Report	Divine, Rudee,, Soji; Murray,

=== Goalscorers ===
There have been 48 goals scored in 6 matches, for an average of 8 goals per match (as of 13 September 2023).

8 goals

- Cullen (Iakwe FC)

5 goals

- Junior (Jabro FC)

4 goals

- Gabino (Jabro FC)
- Kornel (Majuro United)
- Kairus (Majuro United)

3 goals

- Paul (Iakwe FC)
- John (Jabro FC)
- Rudee (Kajur United

2 goals

- Tuetena (Jabro FC)
- Divine (Kajur United)
- Soji (Kajur United)
- Murray (Kajur United)

1 goal

- Dala (Iakwe FC)
- Reggie (Iakwe FC)
- Mohammad (Iakwe FC)
- Dako (Jabro FC)
- Wayne (Jabro FC)
- Luthando (Majuro United)

== See also ==
- Marshall Islands national futsal team
- ECC Sports Stadium
- Ratak Cup
- 2024 Outrigger Challenge Cup
- Soccer in the Marshall Islands
