= Justin Walley (footballer) =

English football manager

Personal information
- Place of birth: Huntingdon, England
- Position: Forward

Senior career*
Years	Team	Apps	(Gls)
2013–18	Riga United FC	60	(5)
2018	FK Cesis	4	(0)
2019–20	Riga United FC	3	(1)
2020–23	FK Aliance	3	(0)

International career
2018	Matabeleland	1	(0)

Managerial career
- 2013–2014: Riga United FC
- 2014–2016: Riga United Ladies
- 2017: FK Aliance
- 2017–2018: Matabeleland
- 2025-: Marshall Islands national soccer team
- * Club domestic league appearances and goals

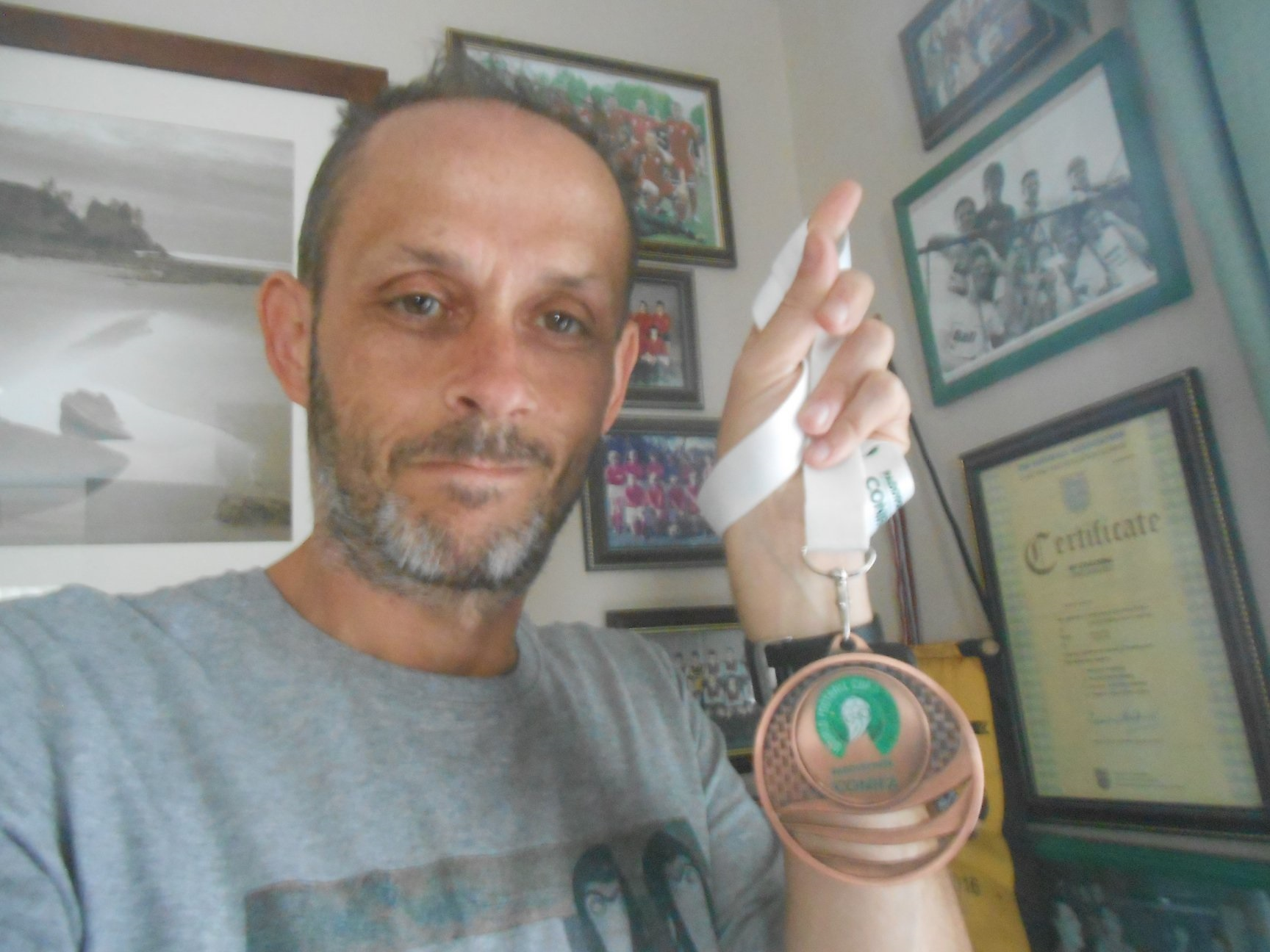
Justin Walley with CONIFA World Football Cup medal

Justin Walley is an English football manager, former player, and published author who is the assistant national team manager of the Marshall Islands national soccer team and press and communications director of the Marshall Islands Soccer Federation.

== Career ==
In 2007, Walley founded the Latvian side Riga United FC. After that, he was appointed manager of Matabeleland. In 2023, he was appointed press and communications director of the Marshall Islands Soccer Federation. In 2025, Walley became the Assistant National Team Manager of the Marshall Islands national soccer team.
