= Riga United FC =

Latvian football club

- Full name: Riga United Football Club; Biedrība "Riga United"
- Nickname: The Black Cats
- Founded: April 20, 2007
- Ground: Riga Secondary School No. 49, Riga
- Capacity: 400
- Coordinates: 56°57′41″N 24°7′15″E
- Board: Justin Walley, Mo Awada, Richard Youatt
- Head Coach: Jeffrey Young (Men)
- League: Latvian Second League
- 2024: 2nd (Latvian Third League, promoted)
- Website: http://www.rigaunited.com/
Home colours	Away colours

Riga United FC is a Latvian football club founded in 2007. The club plays at the Riga Secondary School No. 49 ground in Riga. Riga United men's first team currently plays in the Latvian Second League. The men's reserve team play in the Latvian Third League Central Zone and the woman's team plays in the Latvian Women's League. Riga United is recognised as the first truly multinational football club in the Baltic states: To this date, more than 50 different nationalities have played for the club.

== History ==
Prior to Riga United's ideation, football opportunities were limited for amateur players in Latvia as there was not much demand; football was below the likes of ice hockey and basketball in terms of popularity. Due to this, there were not many chances for foreigners to play football. Around 2000, the only team available for amateur expats was the football team for the British Embassy. This team included players such as former Latvia manager Gary Johnson and English compatriot Justin Walley. Following the British Embassy team's dissolution in the early 2000s, two English teacher coworkers in Latvia, the aforementioned Walley and Jon Whitmore planned to create a football club friendly for amateurs of all nationalities. Although this did not amount to much, bar a few five-a-side games, a team did eventually form a few months later, and a year later John Whitmore took his brave band of Latvians and Russians on tour to the Netherlands, where they finished a credible last in an invitation tournament. The team was simply referred to as 'Zelta Cirks' or 'The Golden Circus'. When Latvia joined the EU in 2004, the number of foreigners living in Latvia saw a dramatic increase. Suddenly, the demand for a Riga-based amateur football team open to players of any nationality, was huge. American Thuc To and Spaniard Vicente Navas teamed up with John Whitmore in the running of an informal football team with a regular core of players competing against one another playing solely indoor 5 a side. Later, Welshman Austin Nicholas became heavily involved as dreams of creating a 'real team' began to take shape. Soon, in 2006, the team 'Riga Out There' was created to play matches. Italian Tancredi Palmeri, who later worked as a football pundit for CNN, was an important member of that team.

=== Riga United FC ===
Riga United Football Club was officially founded on April 20, 2007 by Austin Nicholas, around six years after fellow players John Whitmore and Justin Walley had first discussed the idea of creating a football club that would unite expats and locals. After the founding of Riga United, Austin Nicholas was responsible for the day-to-day running of the club, with the general sponsor Travel Out There financing Riga United's operations. The club's name was chosen by Austin Nicholas and Justin Walley to reflect the fact that this amateur sports club united members of both the local Latvian and expat communities socially and in sport. The team made its debut in the Latvian Amateur Football League in May 2007 and, in doing so, became the first truly multinational team to ever compete in the Latvian Amateur League. In the summer of 2007, Austin Nicholas and Justin Walley met the general secretary of the Latvian Football Federation, Jānis Mežeckis, and discussed the club's 'long term vision' of playing in the Latvian national league within five years.

In late 2011, Riga United was in danger of folding as the financial and time commitments needed to maintain regular football for the club in Latvia became a personal burden on those who ran the club. During the second half of the year, the team stopped training and playing competitive matches. Having left Latvia six months earlier, Justin Walley returned in December 2011 determined to resurrect Riga United Football Club. With the help of Jeffrey Young and Graham Williams the three men agreed that the club needed to start training again and also be run on a more 'professional basis'. It was also agreed that in order to survive and grow, the club's players needed to make the necessary financial commitment to ensure that Riga United operated without any debts. Beginning in January 2012, twice-weekly training sessions were held at Skonto Riga's indoor 3G pitch as Young, Walley and Williams attempted to rebuild the club both on and off the pitch. Many of the club's long-serving players such as Awada, Navis, Kelkit, Benders and Hellstrom played their part in keeping the club alive, while a 'hard-core' of new regulars boosted the club's chances of survival. Proof of this progress was apparent when RUFC toured in Lithuania, where they beat FK Pionieriai at the brand new Lithuanian national football stadium in Vilnius.

In 2012, Riga United won its first cup competition, when the team triumphed in the 2012 Olaine Cup, beating semi-professional side FK Olaine 1-0 in the final after finishing second in their group, and winning their quarter final and semi final matches. This cup success convinced many involved with the club that Riga United was ready to make the jump from 'glorified pub team' to becoming one of Latvia's leading amateur football clubs. In November 2012, an informal meeting was held in Old Riga with around twenty players present, where the idea of entering Riga United in national league competition was discussed and agreed upon. Riga United Youth Academy was founded in April 2013 by Riga United FC and its members Jeffrey Young, Sasha Gussen and Justin Walley.

Riga United FC officially entered the Latvian Second Division in May 2013. Playing its first ever game in the Latvian national league system on May 11, 2013, the senior side lost 1-4 at home to FK Ādaži. Player coach Jeffrey Young became the first Riga United player to score in the national league. Assistant player coach Justin Walley, who captained the side on its league debut, was the first RUFC player to pick up a booking. Riga United's first ever victory in Latvian League Two was a 2-1 away victory against FK Alberts on May 31, 2013. Swede Tommy Eriksen scored both goals. The club made its debut in the Latvian Football Cup on June 12, 2013, when it lost 0-4 away to FK Olaine in the first round, having gone in at half time comfortably drawing 0-0. The match was played in front of a crowd of more than 200. Riga United finished its first season in Latvian League Two in 8th position.

In 2014, filmmaker Stefanos Panagidis released a documentary film about Riga United, entitled 'R.U. Ready?' The film charts the history of Riga United FC from its pre-foundation years starting in 2000, to its official founding in 2007, and the club playing its first national league game in May 2013.

=== Change of management ===
In January 2015, Jeffrey Young departed as head coach of Riga United to concentrate on the club's youth development programme. Assistant Justin Walley also stepped down from the men's team to take on the full-time role of head coach of Riga United Ladies. A new management team of Mo Awada and Graham Williams was appointed to manage Riga United for the 2015 season. In March 2015, the duo enjoyed their first success as Riga United finished as runners up in the Auda Cup, beating league one opponents Preiļu BJSS in the semi-final. Riga United's board, with the overwhelming support of its players, took the decision to move Riga United from the Vidzeme district to the Riga district of Latvian League Two for the club's third national league campaign, beginning in May 2015. Riga United Reserves remained in Latvian League Three for the 2015 season.

=== Riga United Ladies team ===
The Riga United Ladies was formed in May 2014 after Marit Bjorkum Gjerde, Inese Keiša and Justin Walley helped organize the team's first open training session, which around 20 players attended. Riga United Ladies played their first ever competitive match in September 2014, where the team lost 1-3 to FK Liepāja in the Latvian national cup semi final. Marit Bjorkum Gjerde captained the side, while fellow Norwegian Kristin Aune was the first player to ever score a competitive goal for Riga United Ladies in the 1-3 cup defeat to Liepāja. The team was managed by Justin Walley, who was assisted by Graham Williams and Ashley Docker.

Riga United Ladies played its first ever match against non-Latvian opposition in November 2014 when the team lost 1-4 away to Lithuanian Premier League side MFA Žalgiris-MRU in Vilnius. Enija Anna Vaivode became the first ever internationally capped footballer to play for Riga United Football Club when she played for the club in the 1-3 defeat to Liepāja. Latvian international Liene Vāciete joined the club in November 2014 and fellow international Ieva Bidermane signed for Riga United in March 2015. Riga United Ladies reached the quarter finals of the 2014/15 Latvian national Women's Futsal Cup, after finishing second in their group. The squad was coached by Williams and Whitmore. John Whitmore became assistant manager of Riga United Ladies in February 2015 after Graham Williams became head trainer of Riga United's men's team.

On April 12, 2015, Riga United Ladies made their debut in the Latvian Women's Premier League, the SFL. The winners of the SFL represent Latvia in the UEFA Women's Champions League, and United lost their opening match 0-6 against the current Latvian UEFA representatives, Rīgas FS. Two days later, Riga United Ladies played their first ever home game in the Women's Premier League. The game against Optimists Rēzekne ended 1-1, securing Riga United Ladies its first ever point in national league competition. Ieve Bidermane scored Riga United Ladies first ever league goal.

== Riga United Foundation ==
In the autumn of 2014, Riga United's Paul Featherstone created the ‘Riga United Foundation’, the guiding principle of which is to help those less fortunate in the community.

== Stadium ==
Riga United FC plays all its home games at Riga Secondary School No. 49 stadium in Riga. The stadium has a capacity of 400 people and the pitch is artificial 3G.

== Staff ==
Position	Name
Men's head coach	(Latvia) Maksims Harkins
Board Member	(England) Mo Awad
Board Member	(England) Graham Williams
Board Member	(Poland) Sofian Berrahal
Board Member	(Latvia) Pāvels Gognidze
Board member and club secretary	(Germany) André Kliese
Ladies' head coach	(England) Anthony McMullen
Youth Academy Director	(Latvia) Mike Fogels

== Partners ==
Kit sponsors

(Italy) Macron

== Managers' player of the season ==
Season	Name
2014	(Morocco) Karim Gouglou
2013	(Poland) Sofian Berrahal

== League history ==
=== Men's first team ===
Season	Division (Name)	Pos./Teams	Pl.	W	D	L	GS	GA	P	Latvian Football Cup	Top Scorer (League)	Head Coach
2013	Latvian Second League (Vidzeme)	8th	18	3	2	13	21	60	11	first round	(Spain) Josu Samaniego	(United States) Jeffrey Young
2014	Latvian Second League (Vidzeme)	4th	15	7	0	8	31	41	21	first round	(Morocco) Karim Gouglou	(United States) Jeffrey Young

=== Men's reserve team ===
Season	Division (Name)	Pos./Teams	Pl.	W	D	L	GS	GA	P	Latvian Football Cup	Top Scorer (League)	Head Coach
2014	Latvian League 3 (Vidzeme)	2nd	12	9	1	2	38	22	28		(Latvia) Vjačeslavs Meļņiks	(England) John Whitmore

== International players ==
- Enija Anna Vaivode (Latvia women's national football team)
- Liene Vāciete (Latvia women's national football team)

- Ieva Bidermane (Latvia women's national football team)

== Records and statistics ==
Murat Kelkit holds the record for most league appearances for Riga United first team. Justin Walley holds the record for reserve team appearances as he was the only player to feature in every reserve team game during the team's first season in 2014.

The youngest player to ever play for Riga United in a competitive match is Till van Zwamen, who was 16 when he made his league debut. The oldest player to play for Riga United is Justin Walley, who was 43 years when he played during the 2014 season.

The all-time leading goalscorer for Riga United is Josu Samaniego del Campo. Vjačeslavs "Slava" Meļņiks was the first player to score a hat trick for Riga United in national competition when he scored 4 goals for the reserves against FK Lielupe on July 26, 2014.

The club set a new home attendance record on July 11, 2013, when 140 supporters watched their 1–2 defeat to then League Two leaders Marienburg. In September 2013, 125 supporters watched Riga United Ladies Latvian cup semi-final; a record crowd for the ladies team.

Uldis Aliks became the first Riga United player to receive a red card in league twice, when he was sent off after being cautioned twice in the same game away to Upesciems on July 18, 2013.
