= Alīna Skļemenova =

Latvian footballer

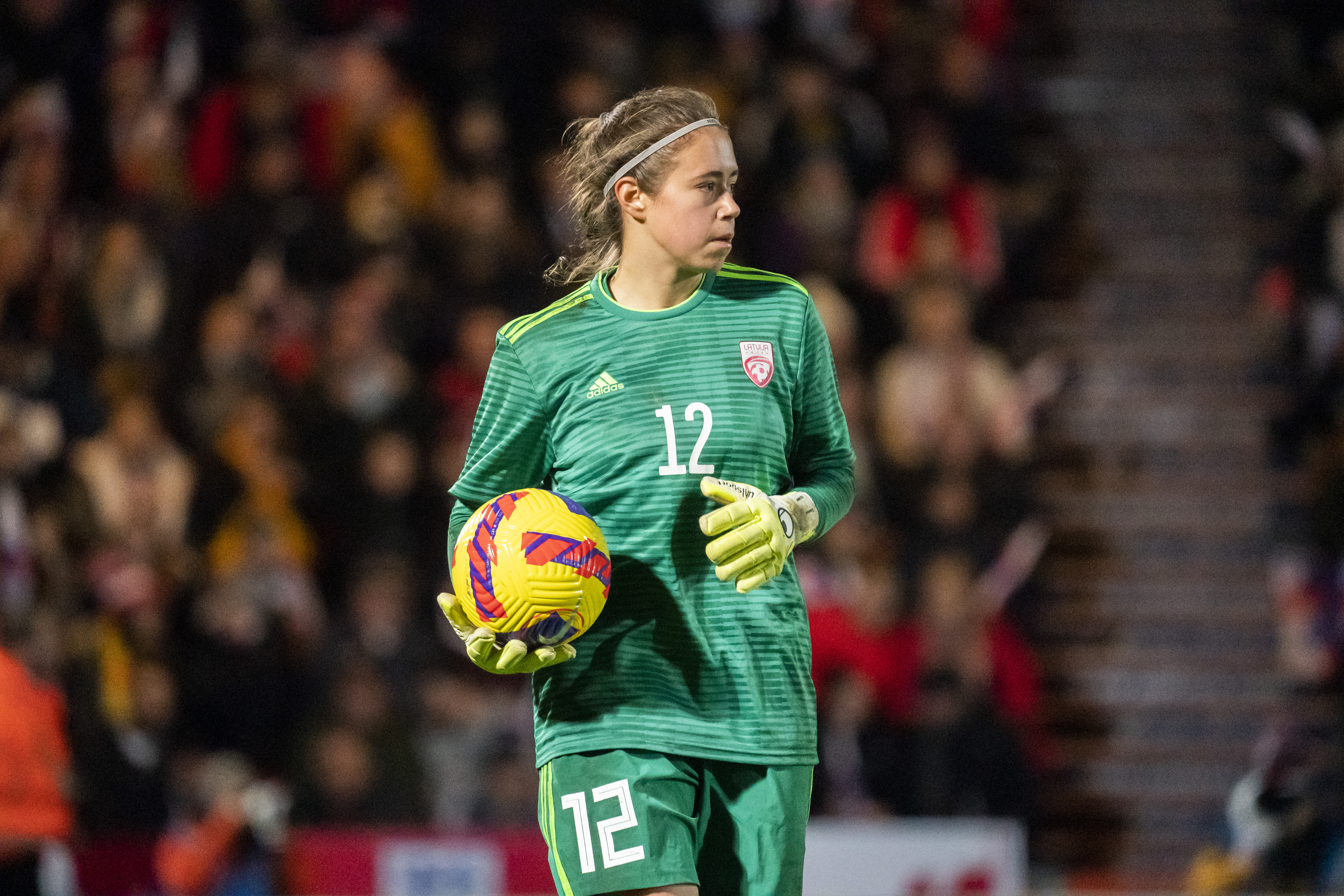

Personal information
- Date of birth: 15 March 2004 (age 22)
- Height: 1.70 m (5 ft 7 in)
- Position: Goalkeeper

Team information
- Current team: RFS
- Number: 12

Youth career
- 2018–2023: Super Nova

Senior career*
Years	Team	Apps	(Gls)
2024–	RFS	19	(0)

International career^{‡}
2019–2020	Latvia U-17	11	(0)
2021–	Latvia U-19	4	(0)
2021–	Latvia	1	(0)
- * Club domestic league appearances and goals as of 9 July 2025 ‡ National team caps and goals as of 14:12, 16 December 2021 (UTC)

Alīna Skļemenova (born 15 March 2004) is a Latvian footballer who plays as a goalkeeper for FK RFS and the Latvia national team.

== International career ==
Skļemenova made her debut for the Latvia national team on 30 November 2021, coming on as a half-time substitute for Laura Siņutkina against England and conceding 12 goals in a record 20–0 defeat.
