= Bauro Martin Jr. =

I-Kiribati footballer

Personal information
- Full name: Bauro Martin Jr.
- Date of birth: 2006 or 2007 (age 19–20)
- Place of birth: Butaritari, Kiribati
- Position: Forward

Team information
- Current team: Tekinati FC

Senior career*
| Years | Team | Apps | (Gls) |
| 2023 | Butaritari | | |
| 2023– | Tekinati FC | | |

International career^{‡}
| 2024 | Kiribati B (futsal) | 3+ | (10) |
| 2026– | Kiribati | 0 (Note: Does not include the 4 appearances and 6 goals scored from the 2026 FMF Inter-District Championship.) | (0) |
- * Club domestic league appearances and goals as of 07:39, 19 November 2026 (UTC) ‡ National team caps and goals as of 07:39, 19 November 2026 (UTC)

Bauro Martin Jr. (born 2006 or 2007) is an I-Kiribati footballer who plays as a forward for KIFF Pro League side Tekinati FC and the Kiribati national team.

== Early life and club career ==
Martin Jr. was born in Butaritari, an atoll in Kiribati. He grew up playing football, before representing Butaritari at the 2023 Te Runga Games, aged 16, where they made it to the quarter-finals. Following the tournament, he joined Tekinati FC.

== International career ==
In September 2026, Martin Jr. was called up to the Kiribati national team for the 2026 FMF Inter-District Championship, an amateur cup competition in Fiji. On 7 October, he scored a hat-trick in Kiribati's 6–0 win against Nadroga, which marked the national team's first ever win in their history. Additionally, he scored in matches against Fiji's under-17 national team and twice in two matches against Seaqaqa, as Kiribati won the tournament. Overall, he scored six goals in four matches, and was awarded the tournament's top goalscorer.

== Futsal career ==
In July 2024, he represented the Kiribati national futsal B team at the 2024 Outrigger Challenge Cup in the Marshall Islands, where he scored 10 goals as they finished third.
