= Guna Ozola =

Latvian footballer

Personal information
- Birth name: Guna Āboliņa
- Date of birth: 1 January 1990 (age 36)
- Position: Defender

Team information
- Current team: Liepāja

Senior career*
Years	Team	Apps	(Gls)
- Gintra Universitetas
- Liepājas Metalurgs
- Skonto / Cerība
- Liepāja

International career^{‡}
2006–2008	Latvia U19	9	(2)
2006–2017	Latvia	13	(0)
- * Club domestic league appearances and goals ‡ National team caps and goals as of 6 August 2017

Guna Ozola (née Āboliņa; born 1 January 1990) is a Latvian footballer who plays as a defender for Sieviešu Futbola Līga club FK Liepāja. She has been a member of the Latvia women's national team.
