= Evelīna Freidenfelde =

Latvian footballer

Personal information
- Date of birth: 3 March 2004 (age 22)
- Position: Midfielder

Team information
- Current team: Liepājas

International career^{‡}
Years	Team	Apps	(Gls)
2020	Latvia U-17	2	(0)
2021–	Latvia U-19	5	(1)
2021–	Latvia	2	(0)
- ‡ National team caps and goals as of 17:03, 16 December 2021 (UTC)

Evelīna Freidenfelde (born 3 March 2004) is a Latvian footballer who plays as a midfielder for Liepājas and the Latvia national team.

== International career ==
Freidenfelde made her debut for the Latvia national team on 17 September 2021, coming on as a substitute for Viktorija Zaičikova against Austria.
