= Marshall Islands national futsal team =

Marshall Islands
- Shirt badge/Association crest
- Association: Marshall Islands Soccer Federation
- Top scorer: Cullen Turanga (4)
- Home stadium: ECC Sports Stadium
- FIFA code: MHL
- FIFA ranking: N/R
Home colours	Away colours

First international
- Marshall Islands 0–8 Kiribati (Majuro, Marshall Islands; 22 July 2024)

Biggest win
- Marshall Islands 8–2 Federated States of Micronesia (Majuro, Marshall Islands; 23 July 2024)

Biggest defeat
- Marshall Islands 0–8 Kiribati (Majuro, Marshall Islands; 22 July 2024)

The Marshall Islands national futsal team represents the Marshall Islands during international futsal competitions. It was formed in 2024 and is controlled by the Marshall Islands Soccer Federation.

== History ==
In 2023, plans for the first ever international fixture for the Marshall Islands were unveiled, with a goal set for 2024. The first futsal tournaments were held on the islands in late 2023 and 2024, with the launch of the Marshall Islands Futsal League and the Ratak Cup. The first international fixtures were announced as the 2024 Outrigger Challenge Cup, scheduled to be played from 22 July to 24 July 2024 against Micronesia and Kiribati.

== All-time fixtures and results ==
22 July 2024 2024 Outrigger Challenge Cup	Marshall Islands	0–8	Kiribati	Majuro, Marshall Islands
		Report	Bangao Bakabane,,,,,, Kaibu Tetabo	Stadium: SDA Sports Hall

23 July 2024 2024 Outrigger Challenge Cup	Marshall Islands	8–2	Federated States of Micronesia	Majuro, Marshall Islands
	Folliet Schutz, Cullen Turanga, Kairos Zinihite; Gabino Peter; Pat Phelon; Ming-Che Tsai	Report	Maphrick Ruweday; Own goal	Stadium: SDA Sports Hall

24 July 2024 2024 Outrigger Challenge Cup SF	Marshall Islands	8–3	Federated States of Micronesia	Majuro, Marshall Islands
	Cullen Turanga, Kairos Zinihite, Ming-Che Tsai; Folliet Schutz; Baaro Tekarawa; Pat Phelon	Report	Zack Henly, Maphrick Ruweday	Stadium: MIHS Sports Hall

24 July 2024 2024 Outrigger Challenge Cup F	Marshall Islands	2–6	Kiribati	Majuro, Marshall Islands
	Gabino Peter 7'; Matt Webb 12'	Report	Kaibu Tetabo 12', 16', 17', 40+2'; Bangao Bakabane 23', 26'	Stadium: MIHS Sports Hall

== Head-to-head record ==
As of match played 24 July 2024

Positive record Neutral record Negative record

Opponent	Pld	W	D	L	GF	GA	GD
Kiribati	2	0	0	2	2	14	-12
Federated States of Micronesia	2	2	0	0	16	5	11
Total	4	2	0	2	18	19	-1

== See also ==
- Marshall Islands Futsal League
- Ratak Cup
- 2024 Outrigger Challenge Cup
- Soccer in the Marshall Islands
