= Ozark United FC =

American professional soccer club based in Rogers

Ozark United
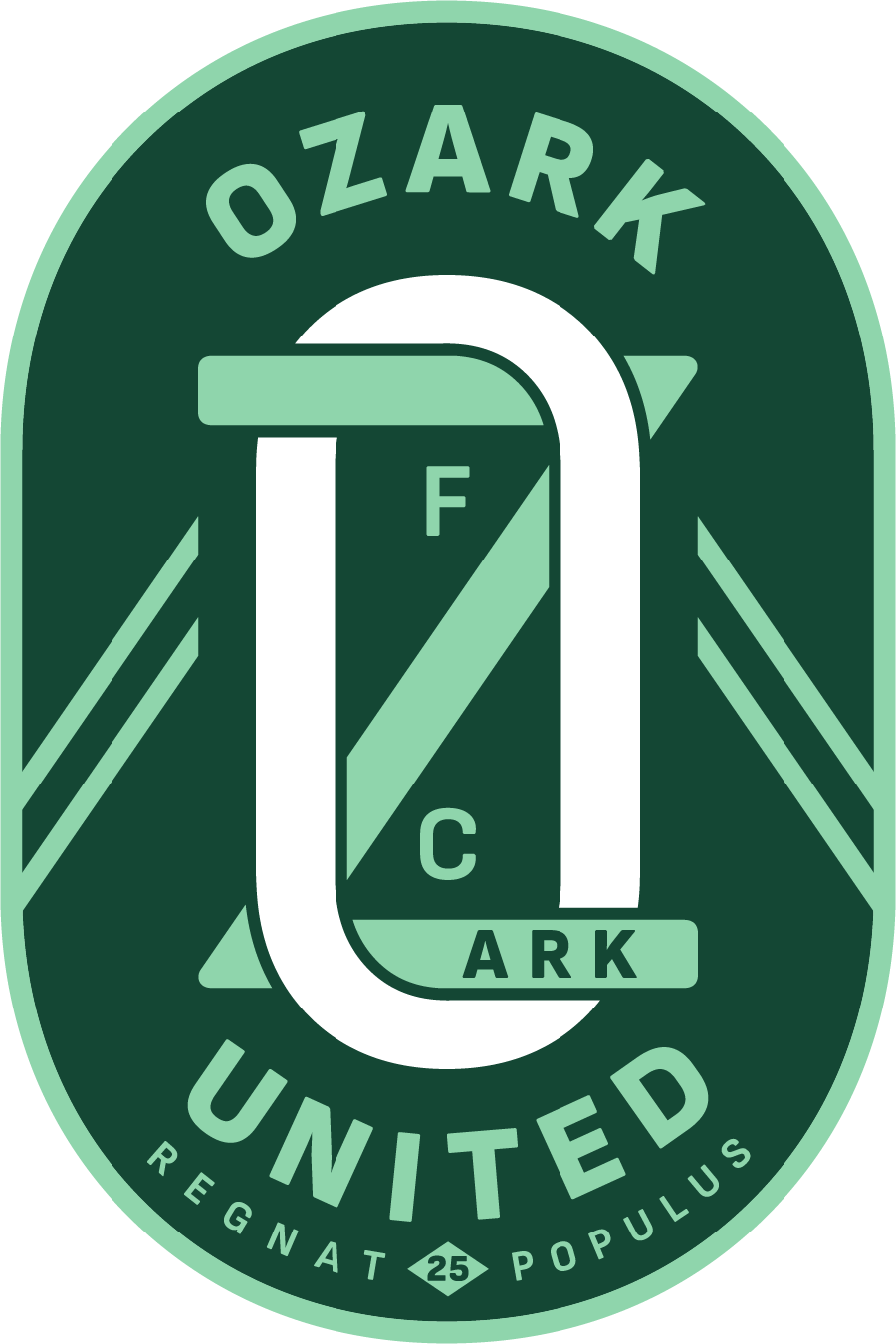
- Full name: Ozark United Football Club
- Founded: July 12, 2023; 3 years ago
- Stadium: Ozark United Stadium (tentative); Rogers, Arkansas
- Capacity: 5,000
- Owners: Chris Martinovic; Warren Smith
- League: USL Championship
- Website: ozarkunited.com

Ozark United Football Club is an upcoming American professional soccer team based in Rogers, Arkansas. Founded in 2023, the club plans to have a men's team in the USL Championship by the 2028 season, and a women's team in the USL Super League debuting in late 2027.

== History ==
On July 12, 2023, the USL awarded an expansion team to the city of Rogers, Arkansas that will represent the Northwest Arkansas region. The founders are Chris Martinovic and Warren Smith.

The club plans to build a new, 5,000-seat stadium located in the Pinnacle Hills area of Rogers. Initially they were expected to buy land north of the Pinnacle Hills Promenade through an agreement with Rogers philanthropist Johnelle Hunt, but on December 12, 2024, the club announced they would be building the stadium in a new, undisclosed location in Pinnacle Hills.

A "Name the Team" campaign created to hear suggestions for team names and branding happened in October 2023. On January 5, 2024, Ozark announced the launch of a Founding Fans panel, a group of 36 fans who will be "instrumental in shaping the club's defining elements — its name, crest, and logo, ensuring that every aspect resonates with the spirit and values of USL Arkansas' supporters and community."

On May 16, 2024, Ozark announced the launch of its U20 academy team, a new initiative to cultivate local soccer talent. The team have been set to play in a combination of academy competitions, including the USL Academy Cup and other USL-sanctioned events, as well as the United Premier Soccer League (UPSL). On February 28, 2025, Ozark announced their youth academy would be expanding for the 2025-26 season, including the addition of six more age groups, new platforms, and participation in USL Academy events as well as a new MLS NEXT competition tier. The teams, playing under the Ozark United FC banner, will compete in the national youth platform at the U13, U14, U15, U16, U17 and U19 levels.

On August 15, 2024, Ozark announced a partnership with Charly, a leading soccer brand from Mexico, to become the official kit and training apparel provider for the club.

On March 25, 2025, Ozark released renderings of its new stadium site, revealing their vision to create a sports-anchored entertainment district in Northwest Arkansas. The 36-acre development, located at the intersection of West Perry Road and South Bellview Road in Rogers, will include commercial, retail and residential spaces along with the stadium which will have expanded seating and upgraded amenities. The expanded scope of the project means the club has delayed kickoff to 2027.

== Colors and crest ==
The club's colors and crest, designed by Stone Ward, were unveiled on October 3, 2024. Multiple listening sessions and fan surveys, were used to help create the club's brand. The club's colors represent the landscape of the Ozark mountains, while the O shape of the badge represents the hilly terrain of the Ozarks. The O-Z monogram represents the interconnectedness of Northwest Arkansas' four main cities – Fayetteville, Springdale, Rogers, and Bentonville.

== See also ==
- 2025 Outrigger Challenge Cup
