= Ērika Gricienko =

Latvian footballer

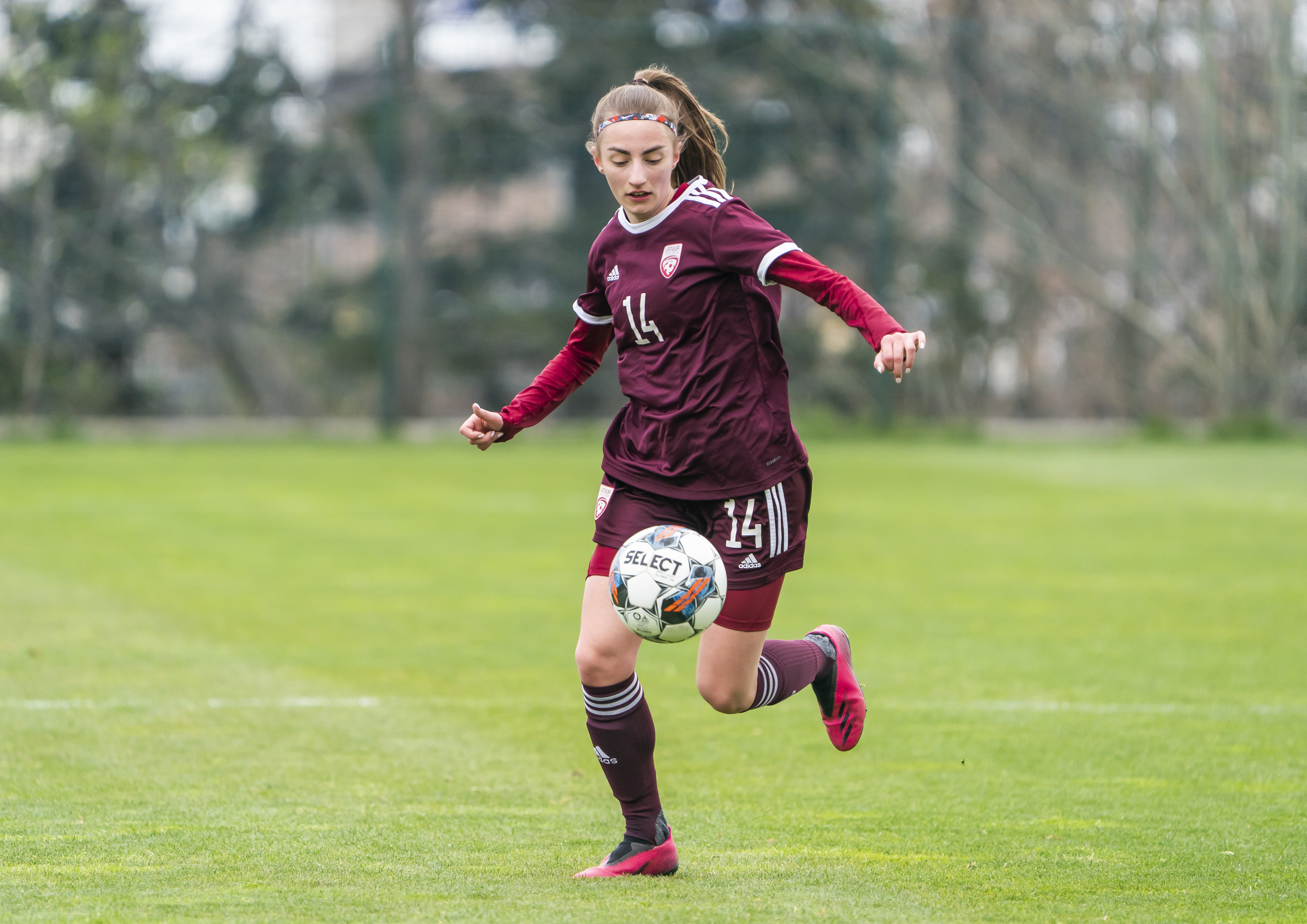

Personal information
- Date of birth: 30 November 2002 (age 23)
- Position: Defender

Team information
- Current team: RFS

International career^{‡}
Years	Team	Apps	(Gls)
2017–2018	Latvia U-17	10	(0)
2019	Latvia U-19	9	(0)
2021–	Latvia	1	(0)
- ‡ National team caps and goals as of 15:33, 16 December 2021 (UTC)

Ērika Gricienko (born 30 November 2002) is a Latvian footballer who plays as a defender for RFS and the Latvia national team.

== International career ==
Gricienko made her debut for the Latvia national team on 30 November 2021, coming on as a substitute for Tatjana Baličeva against England.
