= Nikola Brahmane =

Latvian footballer

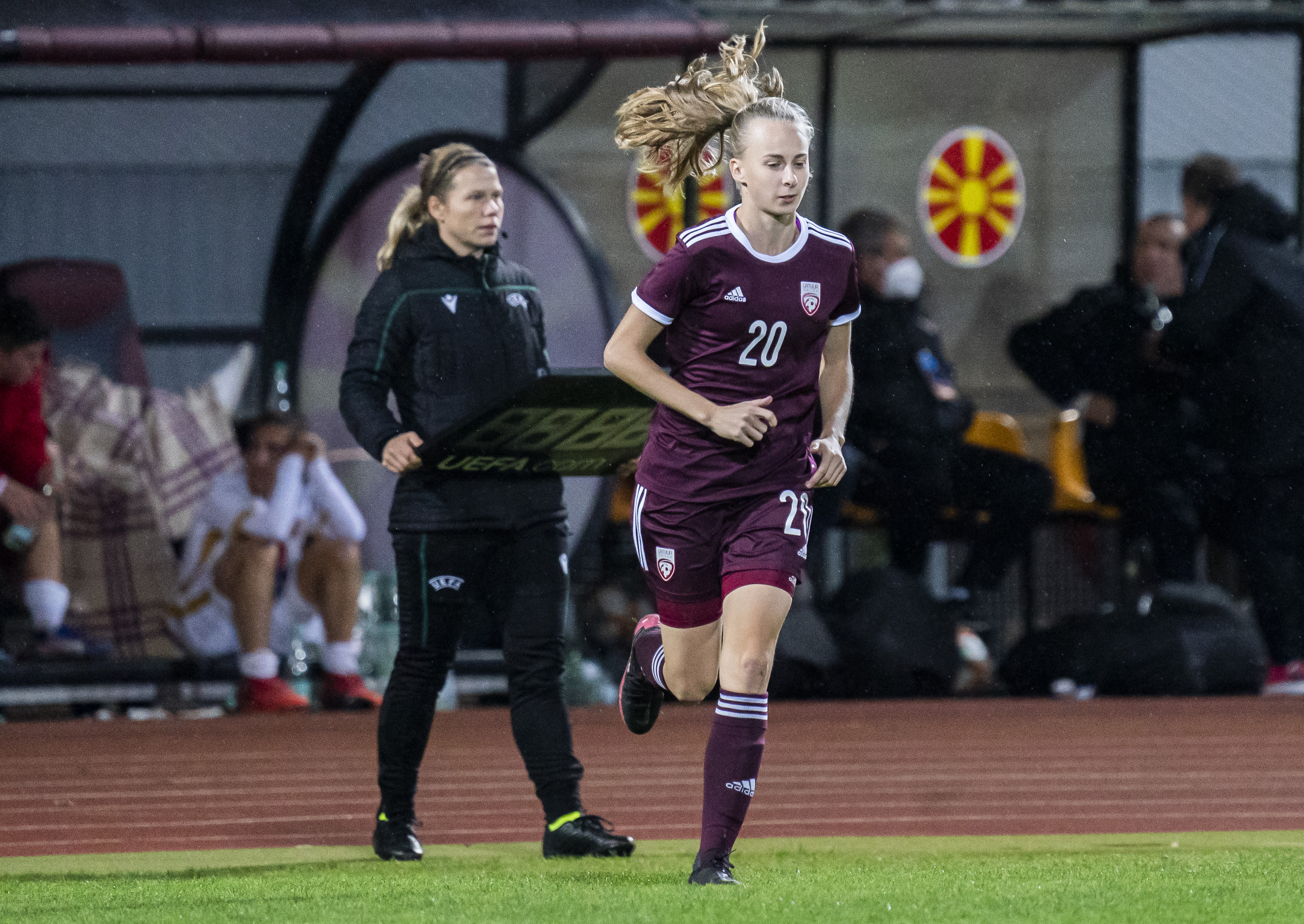

Personal information
- Date of birth: 10 September 1998 (age 28)
- Position: Midfielder

Team information
- Current team: Auda

International career^{‡}
Years	Team	Apps	(Gls)
2021–	Latvia	4	(0)
- ‡ National team caps and goals as of 13:46, 16 December 2021 (UTC)

Nikola Brahmane (born 10 September 1998) is a Latvian footballer who plays as a midfielder for FK Auda (women) and the Latvia national team.

== International career ==
Brahmane made her debut for the Latvia national team on 21 September 2021, coming on as a substitute for Sandra Voitāne against Northern Ireland.
