= Kiribati national futsal team =

Kiribati
- Association: Kiribati Islands Football Federation (KIFF)
- Confederation: OFC (Oceania)
- Top scorer: Bangao Bakabane (18)
| Home colours | Away colours |

First international
- Vanuatu 9–2 Kiribati (Suva, Fiji, 16 May 2011)

Biggest win
- Kiribati 15–2 Micronesia (Majuro, Marshall Islands; 23 July 2024)

Biggest defeat
- Kiribati 1–21 New Zealand (Suva, Fiji; 17 May 2011)

Oceanian Futsal Championship
- Appearances: 1 (First in 2011)
- Best result: Round 1, (2011)

The Kiribati national futsal team represents Kiribati in international futsal. The team is an associate member of the Oceania Football Confederation (OFC).

== History ==
As an associate member of the Oceania Football Confederation, Kiribati competed in the 2011 Oceanian Futsal Championship which served as qualification for the 2012 FIFA Futsal World Cup. It was the nation’s first and only appearance in the competition. Despite not advancing beyond the Group Stage, the team earned a victory over Tuvalu.

== All-time fixtures and results ==
| 16 May 2011 2011 Oceanian Futsal Championship | Vanuatu | 9–2 | Kiribati | Suva, Fiji |
| | | Report | Kireata Sosene; Baunteraoi Kaiorake | Stadium: Vodafone Arena |

| 17 May 2011 2011 Oceanian Futsal Championship | New Zealand | 21–1 | Kiribati | Suva, Fiji |
| | | Report | Teemai Riinga | Stadium: Vodafone Arena |

| 18 May 2011 2011 Oceanian Futsal Championship | Fiji | 22–3 | Kiribati | Suva, Fiji |
| | | Report | Bita Keakea,, | Stadium: Vodafone Arena |

| 19 May 2011 2011 Oceanian Futsal Championship | Tuvalu | 2–3 | Kiribati | Suva, Fiji |
| | | Report | Bita Keakea, Borau Taraba | Stadium: Vodafone Arena |

| 22 July 2024 2024 Outrigger Challenge Cup | Marshall Islands | 0–8 | Kiribati | Majuro, Marshall Islands |
| | | Report | Bangao Bakabane,,,,,, Kaibu Tetabo | Stadium: SDA Sports Hall |

| 23 July 2024 2024 Outrigger Challenge Cup | Kiribati | 15–2 | Micronesia | Majuro, Marshall Islands |
| | Bangao Bakabane,,,,,,, Bitamatang Keakea, Kaibu Tetabo, Longona Selevale, Riuteri Eeri | Report | Zack Henly; Yopi Laurdine | Stadium: SDA Sports Hall |

| 24 July 2024 2024 Outrigger Challenge Cup SF | Kiribati “B” | 3–5 | Kiribati | Majuro, Marshall Islands |
| | Toom Kiteon, Taratiera Rekenibai | Report | Kaibu Tetabo,, Riuteri Eeri; Bangao Bakabane | Stadium: MIHS Sports Hall |

| 24 July 2024 2024 Outrigger Challenge Cup F | Marshall Islands | 2–6 | Kiribati | Majuro, Marshall Islands |
| | Gabino Peter 7'; Matt Webb 12' | Report | Kaibu Tetabo 12', 16', 17', 40+2'; Bangao Bakabane 23', 26' | Stadium: MIHS Sports Hall |

== Head-to-head record ==
As of match played 24 July 2024

Positive Record Neutral Record Negative Record

| Opponent | Pld | W | D | L | GF | GA | GD |
|---|---|---|---|---|---|---|---|
| Fiji | 1 | 0 | 0 | 1 | 3 | 22 | -19 |
| Marshall Islands | 2 | 2 | 0 | 0 | 14 | 2 | 12 |
| Micronesia | 1 | 1 | 0 | 0 | 15 | 2 | 13 |
| New Zealand | 1 | 0 | 0 | 1 | 1 | 21 | -20 |
| Tuvalu | 1 | 1 | 0 | 0 | 3 | 2 | 1 |
| Vanuatu | 1 | 0 | 0 | 1 | 2 | 9 | -7 |
| Total | 7 | 4 | 0 | 3 | 38 | 58 | -20 |

== See also ==
- Kiribati national football team
- Kiribati women's national football team
- Kiribati Islands Football Association
