= ECC Sports Stadium =

Sports venue in Majuro, Marshall Islands

Coordinates: 7°5′12.58″N 171°22′32.71″E

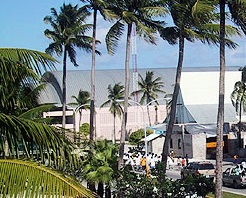
- ECC Sports Stadium (in background) in 2005
- Interactive map of ECC Sports Stadium
- Location: Majuro, Marshall Islands
- Capacity: 2,000

Tenants
- Marshall Islands Futsal League (2023–present); Marshall Islands national futsal team (2024–present); Marshall Islands women's national futsal team

ECC Sports Stadium is an indoor sports arena in Majuro, Marshall Islands. The stadium's capacity is around 2,000. Named after the Educational Cultural Center, it is used principally for basketball, volleyball, and futsal matches. Stadium has 3 pinned arch roof spanning 60m.

The ECC was forced to close down after part of the roof collapsed in June 2011 because of a termite infestation. However, in 2024 the complete refurbishment of the facility was completed as the arena served as a venue for the 2024 Micronesian Games.

== See also ==
- Majuro Track and Field Stadium
