= Ieva Bidermane =

Latvian footballer

Personal information
- Full name: Ieva Bidermane
- Date of birth: November 6, 1984 (age 42)
- Place of birth: Latvia
- Position: Midfielder

International career^{‡}
Years	Team	Apps	(Gls)
2011–2015	Latvia	9	(0)
- ‡ National team caps and goals as of 22:40, 10 April 2015 (UTC)

Dr. Ieva Bidermane (born 6 November 1984) is a Latvian football midfielder.
