= 2024 Outrigger Challenge Cup =

Tournament details
- Host country: Marshall Islands
- City: Majuro
- Dates: 22–24 July 2024
- Teams: 6
- Venues: 2 (in 1 host city)

Final positions
- Champions: Kiribati (1st title)
- Runners-up: Marshall Islands
- Third place: Kiribati “B”
- Fourth place: Federated States of Micronesia

Tournament statistics
- Matches played: 10
- Goals scored: 108 (10.8 per match)
- Top scorer: (Kiribati) Banagao Bakabane (18 goals)
- Best player: (Kiribati) Matakite Taea
- Best young player: (Federated States of Micronesia) Yopi Laurdine

The 2024 Outrigger Challenge Cup was an international futsal tournament organized by the Marshall Islands Soccer Federation, and was hosted in Majuro from 22 to 24 July. Six teams took part in the tournament. It was originally announced as the Men's Futsal Series to be played against Micronesia, but after Kiribati's participation was announced, the name changed to the Outrigger Challenge Cup.

The Marshall Islands played its first-ever international of any football code during the tournament, while Micronesia fielded its first-ever national futsal side. Kiribati defeated the Marshall Islands in the final. The tournament final was broadcast on YouTube using cameras controlled by artificial intelligence.

== Squads ==
=== Kiribati ===
- Bangao Bakabane
- Bitimatang Keakea
- Bauro Martin Jr.
- Toom Kiteon
- Tetaua Beeni
- Taratiera Rekenibai
- Riuteri Eeri
- Matakite Taea
- Longona Selevale
- Barao Taramon
- Kaibu Tetabo
- Teekia Rui

=== Marshall Islands ===
- Jonathan Koehler
- Pat Phelon
- Charles Facer
- Sam Tepou
- David Waiti
- Reggie Waiti
- Cullen Turanga
- Kairos Zinihite
- Tuetena Timon
- Oscar Belamana
- Folliet Schutz
- Junior Villi
- Gabino Peter
- Baaro Tekawara
- Ming-Che Tsai
- Matt Webb

=== Micronesia ===
- Sean Southwick
- Maphrick Ruweday
- Kaiden Mersai
- Myles Mailing
- Kenneth Aldana
- Francisco Laurdin
- Pendura Barnabas Kariti
- Camriche Joseph Pelep
- Zackery Henly
- Yop Laurdine
- Franky Donre
- Jerold Sultan Pluhs
- Enderson Paul
- Lexter James
- Lester James

== Group stage ==
=== Group A ===
Pos	Team	Pld	W	D	L	GF	GA	GD	Pts	Qualification
1	Kiribati	2	2	0	0	23	2	+21	6	Knockout stage
2	Marshall Islands (H)	2	1	0	1	8	10	−2	3	Knockout stage
3	Federated States of Micronesia	2	0	0	2	4	23	−19	0	Knockout stage

(H) Hosts
22 July 2024
12:00

Marshall Islands	0–8	Kiribati
	Report	Bangao Bakabane,,,,,, Kaibu Tetabo

SDA Sports Hall, Majuro, Marshall Islands

23 July 2024
12:00

Kiribati	15–2	Federated States of Micronesia
Bangao Bakabane,,,,,,, Bitamatang Keakea, Kaibu Tetabo, Longona Selevale, Riuteri Eeri	Report	Zack Henly; Yopi Laurdine

SDA Sports Hall, Majuro, Marshall Islands

23 July 2024
14:00

Federated States of Micronesia	2–8	Marshall Islands
Maphrick Ruweday; Own goal	Report	Folliet Schutz, Cullen Turanga, Kairos Zinihite; Gabino Peter; Pat Phelon; Ming-Che Tsai

SDA Sports Hall, Majuro, Marshall Islands

=== Group B ===
Pos	Team	Pld	W	D	L	GF	GA	GD	Pts	Qualification
1	Kiribati "B"	2	2	0	0	17	2	+15	6	Knockout stage
2	Marshall Islands "B" (H)	2	1	0	1	10	12	−2	3	
3	Micronesia "B"	2	0	0	2	3	16	−13	0	

(H) Hosts
22 July 2024
13:00

Kiribati "B"	9–2	Marshall Islands "B"
Bauro Martin Jr.,,,, Tetaua Beeni, Barao Taramon; Toom Kiteon	Report	Ming-Che Tsai; Matt Webb

SDA Sports Hall, Majuro, Marshall Islands

23 July 2024
11:00

Marshall Islands "B"	8–3	Micronesia "B"
Junior Villi, Gabino Peter, Matt Webb, Cullen Turanga; Charles Facer	Report	Zack Henly,,

SDA Sports Hall, Majuro, Marshall Islands

24 July 2024
9:00

Micronesia "B"	0–8	Kiribati "B"
	Report	Tetaua Beeni,, Bauro Martin Jr.,, Barao Taramon; Taratiera Rekenibai

MIHS Sports Hall, Majuro, Marshall Islands

== Knockout stage ==
=== Bracket ===
Semi-finals
24 July - Majuro
Federated States of Micronesia	3
Marshall Islands	8
24 July - Majuro
Kiribati	5
Kiribati “B”	3

Final
24 July - Majuro
Marshall Islands	2
Kiribati	6
Third place match
24 July - Majuro
Federated States of Micronesia	1
Kiribati “B”	15

=== Semi-finals ===
24 July 2024
13:00

Marshall Islands	8–3	Federated States of Micronesia
Cullen Turanga, Kairos Zinihite, Ming-Che Tsai; Folliet Schutz; Baaro Tekarawa; Pat Phelon	Report	Zack Henly, Maphrick Ruweday

MIHS Sports Hall, Majuro, Marshall Islands

24 July 2024
12:00

Kiribati	5–3	Kiribati “B”
Kaibu Tetabo,, Riuteri Eeri; Bangao Bakabane	Report	Toom Kiteon, Taratiera Rekenibai

MIHS Sports Hall, Majuro, Marshall Islands

=== Third-place match ===
24 July 2024
18:00

Federated States of Micronesia	1–15	Kiribati “B”
Jerold Pluhs	Report	Eriati Reebo,, Toom Kiteon, Bauro Martin Jr.,,,, Tetaua Beeni,,,,

MIHS Sports Hall, Majuro, Marshall Islands

=== Final ===
24 July 2024
19:00

Marshall Islands	2–6	Kiribati
Gabino Peter 7'; Matt Webb 12'	Report	Kaibu Tetabo 12', 16', 17', 40+2'; Bangao Bakabane 23', 26'

MIHS Sports Hall, Majuro, Marshall Islands
