= Josiah Blanton =

Marshallese soccer player (born 2002)

Personal information
- Date of birth: February 6, 2002 (age 24)
- Place of birth: Roswell, Georgia, United States
- Height: 6 ft 1 in (1.85 m)
- Positions: Left-back; centre-back

Team information
- Current team: Nona FC
- Number: 12

Youth career
- –2016: Roswell Santos SC
- 2016–2017: Atlanta United
- 2017–2018: United Futbol Academy
- 2018–2020: Concorde Fire

College career
Years	Team	Apps	(Gls)
2020–2024	James Madison Dukes	79	(5)

Senior career*
Years	Team	Apps	(Gls)
2021	Southern Soccer Academy Kings	6	(0)
2022	Asheville City	11	(1)
2024	Charlottesville Blues	7	(0)
2025	Ocean City Nor'easters	5	(0)
2026	Nona FC	6	(1)

International career^{‡}
2025	Marshall Islands	2	(1)
- * Club domestic league appearances and goals as of 18:17, 8 September 2026 (UTC) ‡ National team caps and goals as of June 3, 2026

Josiah Blanton (born February 6, 2002) is a soccer player who plays as a left-back or centre-back for USL League Two side Nona FC. Born in the United States, he represented the Marshall Islands national team at the 2025 Outrigger Challenge Cup.

== Early life and college career ==
Born in Roswell, Georgia, United States, Blanton started at Roswell Santos, before joining Atlanta United in 2016 as one of the club's first academy players. He later played for USSDA side Concorde Fire.

While in his senior year of high school, he was nominated for the Gatorade State High School Player of the Year in Georgia, but lost out to Bosnian youth international midfielder Vedad Kovac. In 2020, he joined the James Madison Dukes in the NCAA Division I, where he played a total of 79 matches across five seasons and made two All-State Second Teams.

In December 2024, Blanton was eligible for the 2024 MLS SuperDraft, but ended up going undrafted. A year later, he was listed as one of the top left-back prospects for the 2025 MLS SuperDraft, but ended up undrafted again.

== Club career ==
In 2021, Blanton joined the Southern Soccer Academy Kings for the 2021 USL League Two season, before spending the 2022 USL League Two season at Asheville City SC.

In 2025, Blanton signed for USL League Two side Ocean City Nor'easters, where he made his debut as a substitute in a 4–1 win against Delaware FC. He later joined Nona FC in April 2026.

== International career ==
In August 2025, Blanton was selected to represent the Marshall Islands in their first ever matches at the 2025 Outrigger Challenge Cup in Springdale, Arkansas. He later scored the Marshall Islands' first ever goal, scoring with a left-footed strike in the 28th minute of a 3–2 defeat to the Turks and Caicos Islands.

== Personal life ==
Blanton attended Roswell High School. His father, Corey, played basketball for the Kennesaw State Owls.

== International career statistics ==
As of match played August 16, 2025

Appearances and goals by national team and year
National team	Year	Apps	Goals
Marshall Islands	2025	2	1
Total		2	1

Scores and results list the Marshall Islands' goal tally first, score column indicates score after each Blanton goal.

List of international goals scored by Josiah Blanton
No.	Date	Venue	Opponent	Score	Result	Competition
1	August 16, 2025	Jarrell Williams Bulldog Stadium, Springdale, United States	Turks and Caicos Islands	1–2	2–3	2025 Outrigger Challenge Cup
