= Alise Gaiķe =

Latvian footballer

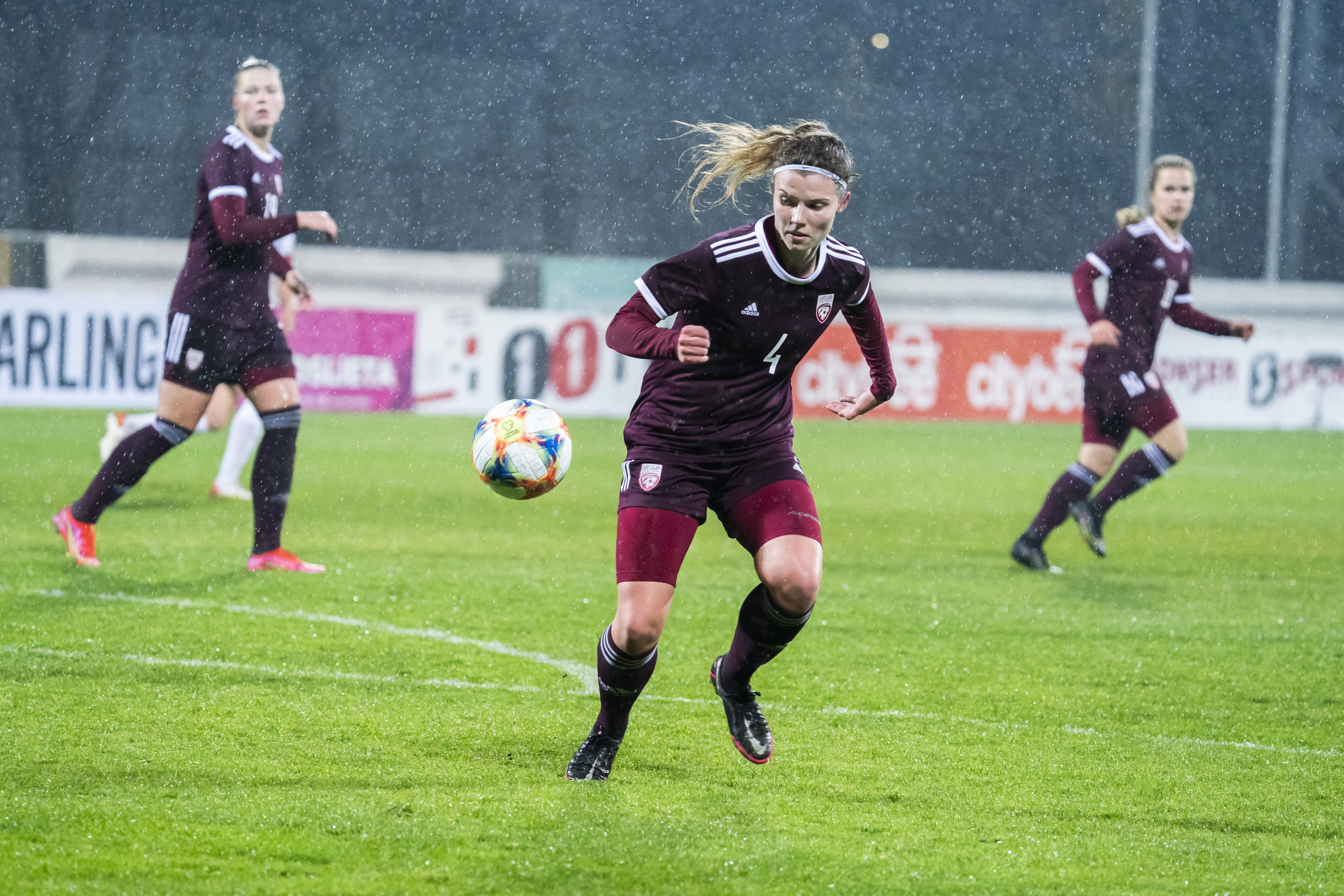

Personal information
- Date of birth: 6 February 2001 (age 25)
- Position: Defender

Team information
- Current team: SK Super Nova

Senior career*
Years	Team	Apps	(Gls)
- SK Super Nova

International career^{‡}
2019	Latvia U-19	9	(0)
2020–	Latvia	6	(0)
- * Club domestic league appearances and goals ‡ National team caps and goals as of 20 July 2023

Alise Gaiķe (born 6 February 2001) is a Latvian footballer who plays as a defender for SK Super Nova and the Latvia women's national team.
