= Marshall Islands Soccer Federation =

Governing body of soccer in the Marshall Islands

OFC
- Founded: 2020; 6 years ago
- FIFA affiliation: N/A
- OFC affiliation: N/A
- President: Shem Livai
- Website: rmi.soccer

The Marshall Islands Soccer Federation is the governing body of soccer in the Marshall Islands. Marshall Islands is not a member of its regional body, the Oceania Football Confederation (OFC), or FIFA. The federation is working towards being recognized by the Marshall Islands National Olympic Committee. It currently organizes the national team, national futsal team, and women's national futsal team.

== History ==
The federation was founded in 2020 with the purpose of introducing the sport to the nation which previously had no soccer history. In May 2019 construction commenced on the Majuro Track and Field Stadium. Originally built as a venue for the Micronesian Games, the stadium would also serve as the home of football in the nation.

In December 2022 it was announced that the MISF had hired its first-ever technical director, British UEFA-licensed coach Lloyd Owers. Owers would be responsible for creating the soccer structure for the nation, including school and youth development programs up to the national team.

In January 2023 the federation launched a GoFundMe campaign. They also announced popular Football Manager website sortitoutsi as their official coaching partner. With the money raised the federation purchased equipment to begin to grow the sport in the nation and released an online coaching course.

Other members of the MISF include Marketing Manager Matt Webb; Press officer Justin Walley and Football Development Executive Max Houchin

On May 29, 2024 the Marshall Islands Soccer Federation announced their first National Women’s Team Head Coach, Katie Smith, a current collegiate coach based in the United States. The first women's national team training camp was held on March 14, 2025.

In 2025 it was announced that the Marshall Islands Men's National Team would be playing their first competitive matches in August 2025.

On August 14, 2025, the Marshall Islands national soccer team played its first match against the United States Virgin Islands national soccer team in Springdale, Arkansas, where the Marshall Islands lost 4–0.

== Competitions ==
The organization first held the Marshall Islands Futsal League in 2023, and the Ratak Cup, the first edition being held in 2024. They also organized the 2024 and 2025 Outrigger Challenge Cup, competition primary for nations in the Northern Pacific region.

== See also ==
- Soccer in the Marshall Islands
