= Marshall Islands national soccer team =

Men's national soccer team

Marshall Islands
- Association: Marshall Islands Soccer Federation (MISF)
- Head coach: Lloyd Owers
- Captain: Seth Sidle
- Top scorer: Josiah Blanton; Aaron Anitok-Brokken (1)
- Home stadium: Majuro Track and Field Stadium
- FIFA code: MHL
First colours	Second colours

First international
- Marshall Islands 0–4 U.S. Virgin Islands (Springdale, United States; August 14, 2025)

Biggest win
- none

Biggest defeat
- Marshall Islands 0–4 U.S. Virgin Islands (Springdale, United States; August 14, 2025)

The Marshall Islands national soccer team represents the Pacific island nation of the Marshall Islands in senior men's international soccer and is controlled by the Marshall Islands Soccer Federation. It is not a member of FIFA or OFC.

== History ==
Prior to 2020, the Marshall Islands Soccer Federation described themselves as the last country in the world without a national football team and one of the few sovereign nations globally to not be a member of FIFA and/or a regional governing body. The nation had virtually no soccer history, with sports such as baseball and basketball being played on the islands because of the nation's close ties to the United States.

The Marshall Islands Soccer Federation was founded on 31 December 2020.

In December 2021, the organization hired its first-ever Technical Director, British UEFA-licensed coach Lloyd Owers making the 13,000 km journey to the country in the summer of 2023. Owers would be responsible for creating the soccer structure for the nation from youth programs to the senior national team.

In January 2024, the Marshall Islands held its first meet-up of players that would comprise the national team setup.

By June 2025, it was announced that the federation was preparing to submit applications to the AFC and CONCACAF. Technical director Lloyd Owers stated that these two confederations were more open to membership.

In August 2025, the federation hosted the 2025 Outrigger Challenge Cup, a competition for Micronesian islands teams. The tournament was played in Springdale, Arkansas as it was home to the largest Marshallese population outside of the islands. During the tournament, on 14 August 2025, Marshall Islands played its first game ever, a 0–4 defeat against US Virgin Islands. During their second game, a 2-3 defeat against Turks and Caicos, Josiah Blanton scored Marshall Islands' first goal ever.

In October 2026, it was announced that the association was planning to play its first-ever home match in 2027 as part of its application to join the Asian Football Confederation and FIFA. The association had been in discussion for a match against Kiribati, but the Northern Mariana Islands and Guam had also expressed interest, creating the possibility for a tournament rather than a one-off match. The MISF had previously applied for the Oceania Football Confederation but was rejected while the AFC had been very welcoming.

== Team image ==
Marshall Islands have relatively small population of about 60,000. However, an additional 20,000 to 30,000 Marshallese citizens live in the United States, predominantly in Hawaii and Arkansas. The soccer federation has stated that the team's foundation would be players based in the Marshall Islands, supplemented by the diaspora members. From 3 to 18 March 2023, the MISF ran a competition to determine a design for the team's first-ever kit. Over 150 designs were submitted from around the world. The federation than announced the four finalists the following month. The winning design was announced on 19 September 2023. Marshall Islands since revealed its first football shirt, signing a deal with PlayerLayer. It was available for purchase in the federation's online store. The kits are produced from recycled plastic in hopes of raising awareness of climate change.

== Stadium ==
The national stadium of the Marshall Islands is the 2,000 capacity Majuro Track and Field Stadium, built as a venue for the Micronesian Games. It is a vital piece of infrastructure for the association's plans to join the Oceania Football Confederation and FIFA.

== Results and fixtures ==
The following is a list of match results in the last twelve months, as well as any future matches that have been scheduled.

Win Draw Loss Fixture

== Head-to-head record ==
As of match played August 16, 2025

Team	Pld	W	D	L	GF	GA	GD	WPCT
Turks and Caicos Islands	1	0	0	1	2	3	−1	0.00
U.S. Virgin Islands	1	0	0	1	0	4	−4	0.00
Total	2	0	0	2	2	7	−5	0.00

== Players ==
=== Current squad ===
The following players were called up for the 2025 Outrigger Challenge Cup.

Caps and goals correct as of 18 August 2025

No.	Pos.	Player	Date of birth (age)	Caps	Goals	Club
1	GK	Matt Perrella	October 6, 1991 (age 35)	2	0	(United States Soccer Federation) Ocean City Nor'easters
13	GK	Zealand Shannon	January 5, 1996 (age 30)	0	0	Unattached
16	GK	Jon Koehler	February 23, 1982 (age 44)	1	0	(Marshall Islands Soccer Federation) Kwajalein FC
2	DF	Patrick Phelon	August 5, 1986 (age 40)	2	0	(Marshall Islands Soccer Federation) Kwajalein FC
3	DF	Matt Webb	March 4, 1991 (age 35)	2	0	(The Football Association) Sidmouth Town
5	DF	Danny Razook	February 1, 1986 (age 40)	2	0	(Marshall Islands Soccer Federation) Kwajalein FC
6	DF	Josiah Blanton	February 6, 2002 (age 24)	2	1	(United States Soccer Federation) Ocean City Nor'easters
19	DF	Seth Sidle (captain)	December 4, 2002 (age 23)	1	0	(United States Soccer Federation) Susquehanna River Hawks
21	DF	Gladius Edejer	November 1, 2007 (age 19)	0	0	(United States Soccer Federation) Cheney Blackhawks
4	MF	Ben Hill	November 14, 2006 (age 19)	0	0	(Marshall Islands Soccer Federation) Kwajalein FC
7	MF	Zach Hill	May 5, 2003 (age 23)	1	0	(Marshall Islands Soccer Federation) Kwajalein FC
8	MF	Cullen Turanga	September 7, 2006 (age 20)	1	0	(Marshall Islands Soccer Federation) Majuro FC
10	MF	Lucas Schriver	March 13, 2005 (age 21)	1	0	(United States Soccer Federation) Wheaton Thunder
11	MF	Folliet Schutz	March 28, 2002 (age 24)	1	0	(United States Soccer Federation) Hawaii-Hilo Vulcans
12	MF	Vinay Kumar	September 19, 2006 (age 20)	0	0	(United States Soccer Federation) Williams Baptist Eagles
14	MF	Gabino Gallegos	December 24, 2006 (age 19)	0	0	(Marshall Islands Soccer Federation) Majuro FC
17	MF	Dominic Pace	February 2, 2007 (age 19)	0	0	(Marshall Islands Soccer Federation) Kwajalein FC
18	MF	Jaya Corder	August 11, 2007 (age 19)	0	0	(Marshall Islands Soccer Federation) Kwajalein FC
22	MF	David Nigro	May 18, 1995 (age 31)	1	0	(United States Soccer Federation) Jackson Lions
23	MF	Zach London	May 27, 2010 (age 16)	2	0	(United States Soccer Federation) Liverpool International Academy, Michigan
9	FW	Kairos Zinihite	February 2, 2004 (age 22)	0	0	(Marshall Islands Soccer Federation) Majuro FC
15	FW	Matt John	March 21, 2001 (age 25)	0	0	Unattached
20	FW	Aaron Anitok-Brokken	August 14, 2007 (age 19)	2	1	(United States Soccer Federation) Clark Penguins

== Records ==
As of 16 August 2025

Players in bold are still active with Marshall Islands.

=== Top goalscorers ===
Rank	Player	Goals	Caps	Ratio	Career
1	**Aaron Anitok-Brokken**	1	2	0.5	2025–present
1	**Josiah Blanton**	1	2	0.5	2025–present
