= Delap SDA School =

Location
- Majuro; Delap 96960-1009; Marshall Islands; 7.091974°N 171.383359°E

Information
- School type: Independent K–12 School
- Religious affiliation: Seventh-day Adventist Church
- Founded: 1978
- School number: 692-456-5097
- Principal: Ringlen Ringlen
- Grades: K to 12
- Language: English
- Colors: Purple and White
- Team name: Shrenz

Delap SDA School, also known as Majuro SDA School or Seventh-day Adventist, is a private co-educational K-12 Christian school operated by the Guam-Micronesia Mission of Seventh-day Adventists. It is located in Delap, on the island of Majuro, in the Republic of the Marshall Islands. The school is located directly beside the Majuro Cooperative School, and within 500 meters (1,600 ft) of the hospital and the capitol building.

== History ==
Delap SDA School was founded in 1978. Throughout the history of the school, it has been operated by student missionaries attending Seventh-day Adventist colleges and universities across the world, but primarily from North America, Brazil, and the Philippines.

== Campus ==
The school campus is home to a gymnasium/cafeteria building, the administration/high school building, and an elementary school building. The campus is also home to the Delap Seventh-day Adventist church, as well as living quarters for the faculty and staff of the school. Like much of the Marshall Islands, the school is located directly beside the Pacific Ocean.

== Academics ==
The language of instruction at the school is English, from kindergarten through grade 12. The school, like the other private schools on Majuro, is known for test results that are higher than the public school system. The school uniforms are a purple dress and white blouse for girls, and black pants and a purple collared shirt for boys.

== Athletics ==
Delap SDA School competes in athletic competitions against the other high schools on Majuro, and occasionally from other islands. The school competes in boys and girls basketball and volleyball, and occasionally in soccer as well. The team name is the Shrenz.

== Affiliates ==
A sister school operates in Laura, called Laura SDA School. Laura SDA School offers K-8 education.

== See also ==
- Seventh-day Adventist Church
- Seventh-day Adventist education
- List of Seventh-day Adventist secondary schools
