= 2025 Outrigger Challenge Cup =

Tournament details
- Host country: United States
- City: Springdale, Arkansas
- Dates: 13–16 August
- Teams: 4
- Venue: 1 (in 1 host city)

Final positions
- Champions: U.S. Virgin Islands

Tournament statistics
- Matches played: 4
- Goals scored: 17 (4.25 per match)

The 2025 Outrigger Challenge Cup was an international association football tournament organized by the Marshall Islands Soccer Federation, and hosted in Springdale, Arkansas from 13 to 16 August. Four teams took part in the tournament.

== Background ==
The federation crowdfunded over £20,000 for the tournament. Teams that participated in the tournament are Ozark United FC U19, the Marshall Islands, Turks and Caicos, and the U.S. Virgin Islands. The Marshall Islands national soccer team played their first international fixture at the tournament.

The United States Virgin Islands won the tournament, with three wins. It was the first time the territory had won back-to-back matches of any kind in more than fourteen years. With three international goals against the Marshall Islands, Rakeem Joseph became the USVI's all-time top scorer.

== Table ==
Pos	Team	Pld	W	D	L	GF	GA	GD	Pts	
1	U.S. Virgin Islands	3	3	0	0	9	3	+6	9	Champions
2	Turks and Caicos Islands	3	2	0	1	7	6	+1	6	
3	(Arkansas) Ozark United U19	2	0	0	2	5	7	−2	0	
4	Marshall Islands	2	0	0	2	2	7	−5	0	

== Matches ==
August 13, 2025
19:00

U.S. Virgin Islands	1–1	Turks and Caicos Islands
Rodriguez 36'	Report; Report	Paul 15'
Penalties
	5–4

Jarrell Williams Bulldog Stadium, Springdale, Arkansas, United States
August 14, 2025
17:00

Turks and Caicos Islands	3–3	(Arkansas) Ozark United U19
??? 65'; ??? 75'; ??? 81'		Campbell 15', 91' (pen.); Marksberry 23'
Penalties
	5–4

Jarrell Williams Bulldog Stadium, Springdale, Arkansas, United States

August 14, 2025
19:30

Marshall Islands	0–4	U.S. Virgin Islands
	Report	Rakeem Joseph 4', 42' (pen.), 61'; Catone-Highfield 80'

Jarrell Williams Bulldog Stadium, Springdale, Arkansas, United States
Referee: Alfie Watts (England)

August 16, 2025
12:00

Turks and Caicos Islands	3–2	Marshall Islands
Clervil 15', 32'; Paul 24'	Report	Blanton 27'; Anitok-Brokken 72' (pen.)

Jarrell Williams Bulldog Stadium, Springdale, Arkansas, United States
Referee: Blake Burton (United States)
August 16, 2025
16:00

U.S. Virgin Islands	4–2	(Arkansas) Ozark United U19
Henry 13'; Joseph 16'; Roth 83'; Bass 90+'		Campbell 8' (pen.), 58'

Jarrell Williams Bulldog Stadium, Springdale, Arkansas, United States

== Statistics ==
=== Goalscorers ===
There were 17 goals scored in 4 matches, for an average of 4.25 goals per match.

3 goals

- (United States Virgin Islands) Rakeem Joseph

2 goals

- (Turks and Caicos Islands) Keniel Clervil
- (Turks and Caicos Islands) Junior Paul

1 goal

- (Marshall Islands) Aaron Anitok-Brokken
- (Marshall Islands) Josiah Blanton
- (United States Virgin Islands) Gabriel Catone-Highfield
- (United States Virgin Islands) Carmelo Rodriguez
