= Marshall Islands High School =

Location
- Majuro; Marshall Islands
- Coordinates: 7°07′07″N 171°21′57″E

Information
- Type: Public high school
- Established: 1963; 62 years ago
- School district: Marshall Islands Public School System
- Grades: 9–12
- Color(s): Green; White
- Mascot: Gecko
- Nickname: Majol Island
- Accreditation: Western Association of Schools and Colleges
- Website: www.mihsmeto.org

Marshall Islands High School (also known as Majol Island or MIHS) is the main public high school located in Rita, Delap-Uliga-Djarrit, in Majuro atoll, the capital city of the Marshall Islands. Marshall Islands High School is the largest high school in the country of the Marshall Islands. MIHS is part of the Marshall Islands Public School System.

The school serves the atolls and islands of Majuro, Arno, Enewetak, and Mili.

== History ==
Marshall Islands High School began as Marshall Islands Intermediate School, being established as a high school around the time at which the first class graduated in 1965, a class which numbered 13 students.

An addition was built between the late 1960s to the middle of the 1970s, a period when several other public high schools were built in the Trust Territory of the Pacific Islands.

In the 1994-1995 school year it had over 700 students, making it the country's largest high school. In 1996 the dropout rate was 16%.

The president of the Marshall Islands, Hilda Heine, attended Marshall Islands High School before attending college in the United States.
