= 2022–23 Ukrainian Women's Higher League =

Ukrainian Women's League
- Season: 2022–23
- Champions: Vorskla Poltava
- Relegated: Ateks Kyiv
- UEFA Women's Champions League: Vorskla Poltava, Kryvbas Kryvyi Rih

The 2022–23 season of the Ukrainian Football Championship was the 32nd season of Ukraine's top women's football league. Consisting of two tiers it started on 10 September 2022.

Due to the 2022 wide scale Russian invasion of Ukraine, several teams are not able to resume competitions including the reigning champions WFC Zhytlobud-1 Kharkiv.

== Format ==
The format of competitions for the season changed again for both tiers, but not significantly. The league finally expanded to 12 teams as it planned earlier and adopted classical format with straight double round-robin tournament home and away for the top tier (Vyshcha Liha) with the last team is set to be relegated to the lower tier for the next season. The top two teams qualify for the European competitions.

== Vyshcha Liha teams ==
Locations of teams in the 2022–23 Ukrainian Championship Higher League

=== Team changes ===
Promoted	Relegated
Dynamo Kyiv; Shakhtar Donetsk; Dnipro-1; Veres Rivne	Zhytlobud-1 Kharkiv (withdrew); Voskhod Stara Mayachka (withdrew); Karpaty Lviv (withdrew)

=== Name changes ===
- On 10 September 2022, WFC Zhytlobud-2 Kharkiv has officially transformed into a women team of FC Vorskla Poltava.

=== Vyshcha Liha teams notes ===
The women football department of the Ukrainian Association of Football decided to preserve place in the Vyshcha Liha for the next season (2023–24) for the main squads of Zhytlobud-1 and Voskhod "due to the difficult situation in their regions related to the Russian aggression against Ukraine". In January 2024, it became known that the President of WFC Voskhod, since late 2022, had re-registered his company in the Russian Federation.

== Vyshcha Liha stadiums ==
Due to ongoing Russian aggression against Ukraine, many teams played their games in Kyiv or its suburbs. Critical role in providing a playing turf for the league's participant played Arsenal Arena and Livyi Bereh in the Kyiv's eastern suburbs Shchaslyve and Hnidyn.

Team	Home city	Home ground	Capacity
Dynamo	Kyiv (Koncha-Zaspa)	Dynamo Training Center	1,200
Mariupol	Mariupol	Bannikov Training Complex (Kyiv) Livyi Bereh (Kyiv, 1 game)	1,678 1,500
Dnipro-1	Dnipro	Dnipro Training Case Bannikov Training Complex (Kyiv, 1 game)	N/A 1,678
Ateks	Kyiv	Livyi Bereh	1,500
Shakhtar	Donetsk	Arsenal Arena (Shchaslyve) Arsenal Training Center (Shchaslyve)	1,000 N/A
Kryvbas	Kryvyi Rih	Sparta Hirnyk Arsenal Arena (Shchaslyve, 4 games)	N/A 2,500 1,000
Kolos	Kovalivka	Kolos Kolos Training Center (Sofiyivska Borshchahivka) Avanhard (Hrebinky, 1 game)	5,000 N/A N/A
Pantery Uman	Uman	Tsentralny Stadion	7,552
EMS Podillia	Vinnytsia	Stadion Palatsu ditey i yunatstva	1,500
Veres	Kostopil	Kolos Veres Training Center (Rivne) Kolos (Mlyniv, 2 games) Avanhard (Rivne, 1 game)	2,500 N/A 850 4,650
Ladomyr	Volodymyr	Olimp	2,000
Vorskla	Poltava	Vorskla Molodizhnyi Arsenal Arena (Shchaslyve, 3 games) Arsenal Training Center (Shchaslyve, 2 games) Avanhard (Uzhhorod, 1 game) Bannikov Training Complex (Kyiv, 1 game)	24,795 N/A 1,000 N/A 12,000 1,678

== Vyshcha Liha managers ==
Club	Head coach	Replaced coach
Ladomyr Volodymyr	(Ukraine) Oleh Bortnik	
Kryvbas Kryvyi Rih	(Ukraine) Volodymyr Yefimako	
Vorskla Poltava	(Ukraine) Natalia Zinchenko	
Dynamo Kyiv	(Ukraine) Volodymyr Pyatenko	
Veres Rivne	(Ukraine) Olena Ruda	
EMS-Podillia Vinnytsia	(Ukraine) Oleksandr Dudnik	
Mariupol	(Ukraine) Karina Kulakovska	
Pantery Uman	(Ukraine) Yuriy Derenyuk	
Kolos Kovalivka	(Ukraine) Lyudmyla Pokotylo	
Shakhtar Donetsk	(Ukraine) Roman Zayev	
Dnipro-1	(Ukraine) Olena Kudziyeva	
Ateks Kyiv	(Ukraine) Alla Hres	

Team	Outgoing manager	Manner of departure	Date of vacancy	Table	Incoming manager	Date of appointment	Table
Kryvbas Kryvyi Rih	(Moldova) Alina Stetsenko		1 August 2022	Pre-season	(Ukraine) Volodymyr Yefimako	22 August 2022	Pre-season
Veres Rivne	(Ukraine) Mykola Sidorchuk	Joined Armed Forces		Pre-season	(Ukraine) Olena Ruda	8 September 2022	Pre-season

== Vyshcha Liha league table ==
Pos	Team	Pld	W	D	L	GF	GA	GD	Pts	Qualification or relegation
1	Vorskla Poltava (Note: Participant of the 2021–22 Ukrainian Women's Cup final.) (C)	22	22	0	0	147	4	+143	66	Qualification for the Champions League qualifying second round
2	Kryvbas Kryvyi Rih	22	19	0	3	120	10	+110	57	Qualification for the Champions League qualifying first round
3	Kolos Kovalivka	22	16	1	5	54	12	+42	49	
4	Shakhtar Donetsk	22	16	0	6	74	27	+47	48	
5	Ladomyr Volodymyr	22	12	0	10	83	49	+34	36	
6	Dnipro-1	22	9	2	11	47	49	−2	29	
7	Dynamo Kyiv	22	9	2	11	35	41	−6	29	
8	Veres Rivne	22	6	2	14	33	71	−38	20	
9	Mariupol	22	6	1	15	23	78	−55	19	
10	EMS Podillia Vinnytsia	22	5	3	14	22	61	−39	18	
11	Pantery Uman	22	5	2	15	20	75	−55	17	
12	Ateks Kyiv (R)	22	0	1	21	8	189	−181	1	Relegation to the Persha Liha

Source: womensfootball.com.ua
Rules for classification: 1) Points; 2) Head-to-head points; 3) Head-to-head goal difference; 4) Head-to-head goals scored; 5) Goal difference; 6) Goals scored.
(C) Champions; (R) Relegated

== Vyshcha Liha results ==
Home \ Away	DNI	LAD	MAR	KOL	PAN	POD	SHA	DYN	VOR	ATX	KRY	VER
Dnipro-1		2–1	1–3	0–1	1–2	2–2	0–2	0–2	1–5	14–2	0–7	2–1
Ladomyr Volodymyr	8–1		7–1	1–3	3–2	6–1	2–3	2–0	1–5	17–1	0–4	8–0
Mariupol	0–8	0–3		0–1	5–2	0–1	0–6	0–3	0–10	3–0	2–8	1–2
Kolos Kovalivka	2–0	4–0	5–1		0–0	2–0	0–1	1–0	0–2	14–0	0–1	3–0
Pantery Uman	0–2	0–6	0–1	0–1		0–3	0–7	2–1	0–8	5–1	1–5	0–4
EMS Podillia Vinnytsia	1–2	1–3	1–2	0–3	0–2		0–2	0–3	0–4	6–1	0–13	2–2
Shakhtar Donetsk	1–2	6–1	3–0	0–2	8–1	2–0		2–1	0–5	7–0	0–5	3–1
Dynamo Kyiv	0–2	1–0	3–1	2–1	1–1	0–0	0–5		0–5	3–0	0–5	4–0
Vorskla Poltava	4–0	11–0	8–0	4–0	6–0	7–0	2–0	5–1		14–0	3–0	9–0
Ateks Kyiv	0–6	0–8	0–0	0–5	1–2	0–2	0–11	1–9	0–23		0–16	0–6
Kryvbas Kryvyi Rih	4–0	2–1	6–0	0–1	8–0	5–0	5–0	6–0	1–2	8–0		7–0
Veres Rivne	1–1	1–5	0–3	0–5	3–0	0–2	0–5	2–1	0–5	10–1	0–4	

Source: [ WFPL.UA]
Legend: Blue = home team win; Yellow = draw; Red = away team win.

== Statistics ==
=== Top scorers ===
As of 26 June 2023

Rank	Player	Club	Goals
1	(Ukraine) Yana Kalinina	Vorskla Poltava	39
2	(Ukraine) Polina Yanchuk	Kryvbas Kryvyi Rih	37 (4)
3	(Ukraine) Viktoria Hiryn	Ladomyr Volodymyr	36 (2)
4	(Ukraine) Roksolana Kravchuk	Vorskla Poltava	24
5	(Ukraine) Veronika Andrukhiv	Vorskla Poltava	23 (1)

== Persha Liha ==
Pos	Team	Pld	W	D	L	GF	GA	GD	Pts
1	Lider Kobeliaky (C)	8	6	1	1	21	5	+16	19 (Note: Head-to-head points: Lider 4, Yunist 1)
2	Yunist Chernihiv	8	6	1	1	19	5	+14	19
3	Iantarochka Novoiavorivsk	8	3	1	4	11	16	−5	10
4	Rukh Lviv (Note: Last season Rukh Lviv played as Chempion Ternopil.)	8	2	1	5	11	21	−10	7
5	Prykarpattia-DIuSSh-3 Iv.Frankivsk (Note: Prykarpattia had 3 points stripped for no show at the away match against Yunist Chernihiv on 28 May 2023, last round of the competition.)	8	0	2	6	8	23	−15	−1

Source: womensfootball.com.ua
Rules for classification: 1) Points; 2) Head-to-head points; 3) Head-to-head goal difference; 4) Head-to-head goals scored; 5) Goal difference; 6) Goals scored.
(C) Champions

=== Zhytlobud-1 U-21 Kharkiv ===
The last season participant Persha Stolytsia Kharkiv went abroad and relocated to Zürich. Based out of Zürich, the team first participated in an international exhibition tournament as Zhytlobud-1 U-21 Kharkiv and then played few friendlies with Swiss teams winning one of them 8–0 although on the official website of their opponents it was claimed as 0–7 loss. Eventually for the 2022–23 the Kharkiv's junior team joined the Swiss 4th division of women football as a junior team of SC Wipkingen, SC Wipkingen ZH 2.

For the next 2023–24 many players joined FC Kloten which plays in the Swiss second tier, while couple of others joined other second tier clubs.

== See also ==
- 2022–23 Ukrainian Premier League
