= 2023–24 Ukrainian Women's Higher League =

Ukrainian Women's Top League
- Season: 2023–24
- Champions: Vorskla Poltava
- Relegated: WFC Mariupol; Veres Rivne; SC Dnipro-1 (withdrew); Dynamo Kyiv (withdrew)
- UEFA Women's Champions League: Vorskla Poltava; Kolos Kovalivka

The 2023–24 season of the Ukrainian Football Championship was the 33rd season of Ukraine's top women's football league. Consisting of two tiers it started on 5 August 2023.

Due to the Russian invasion of Ukraine, several teams are not able to resume competitions.

== Format ==
The format of competitions for the season changed again. The Higher (Vyshcha) League returned to format consisting of two stages. At the first stage all 12 teams play single round robin with top 6 teams qualify for the Championship group and bottom 6 teams to Relegation group. Each group conducts double round robin tournament. The bottom team is to be relegated while 4th and 5th teams of Relegation table will contest their berth in the Higher League with better teams of the First League (2nd tier).

The First (Persha) League consists of two groups of 8. Each group conducts double round robin tournament with the top 2 teams from each group qualify for the championship play-off consisting of semi-finals, final and the match for the third place. The Champion of the First League gets direct promotion, while 2nd and 3rd will contest their berth in the Higher League with the worse teams of the Higher League (1st tier).

== Vyshcha Liha teams ==
Locations of teams in the 2023–24 Ukrainian Championship Higher League

=== Team changes ===
Promoted	Relegated
Zhytlobud-1 Kharkiv (returns)	Ateks Kyiv

=== Name changes ===
- On 20 March 2024, WFC Zhytlobud-1 Kharkiv has officially changed its name to Metalist 1925 Kharkiv of FC Metalist 1925 Kharkiv.

=== Vyshcha Liha teams notes ===
In July 2022, the women football department of the Ukrainian Association of Football decided to preserve place in the Vyshcha Liha for the next season (2023–24) for the main squads of Zhytlobud-1 and Voskhod "due to the difficult situation in their regions related to the Russian aggression against Ukraine".

== Vyshcha Liha stadiums ==
Due to ongoing Russian aggression against Ukraine, many teams played their games in Kyiv or its suburbs. Critical role in providing a playing turf for the league's participant played Arsenal Arena and Livyi Bereh in the Kyiv's eastern suburbs Shchaslyve and Hnidyn.

Team	Home city	Home ground	Capacity
Dynamo	Kyiv	Dynamo Training Center (Koncha-Zaspa)	1,200
Mariupol	Mariupol	Temp (Kyiv)	2,400
Dnipro-1	Dnipro	Dnipro Training Case	N/A
Shakhtar	Donetsk	Arsenal Arena (Shchaslyve)	1,000
Metalist 1925	Kharkiv	Arsenal Arena (Shchaslyve)	1,000
Kryvbas	Kryvyi Rih	Hirnyk	2,500
Kolos	Kovalivka Kalynivka	Kolos Tsentralnyi Stadion	5,000 N/A
Pantery	Uman	Tsentralny Stadion	7,552
EMS Podillia	Vinnytsia	Tsentralnyi Stadion Stadion Palatsu ditey i yunatstva	24,000 1,500
Veres	Kostopil Mlyniv	Kolos Kolos	2,500 850
Ladomyr	Volodymyr	Olimp	2,000
Vorskla	Poltava	Vorskla	24,795

== Vyshcha Liha managers ==
Club	Head coach	Replaced coach
Ladomyr Volodymyr	(Ukraine) Oleh Bortnik	
Kryvbas Kryvyi Rih	(Ukraine) Kostiantyn Frolov	
Vorskla Poltava	(Ukraine) Natalia Zinchenko	
Dynamo Kyiv	(Ukraine) Volodymyr Yefimako	
Veres Rivne	(Ukraine) Olena Ruda	
EMS-Podillia Vinnytsia	(Ukraine) Oleksandr Dudnik	
Mariupol	(Ukraine) Karina Kulakovska	
Pantery Uman	(Ukraine) Yuriy Derenyuk	
Kolos Kovalivka	(Ukraine) Lyudmyla Pokotylo	
Shakhtar Donetsk	(Ukraine) Roman Zayev	
Dnipro-1	(Ukraine) Olena Kudziyeva	
Metalist 1925 Kharkiv	(Ukraine) Volodymyr Pyatenko	

Team	Outgoing manager	Manner of departure	Date of vacancy	Table	Incoming manager	Date of appointment	Table

== Vyshcha Liha league table ==
Pos	Team	Pld	W	D	L	GF	GA	GD	Pts	Qualification or relegation
1	Kryvbas Kryvyi Rih	11	10	1	0	36	6	+30	31	Qualification for the Championship Group
2	Vorskla Poltava	11	9	1	1	63	3	+60	28	Qualification for the Championship Group
3	Kolos Kovalivka	11	8	1	2	31	8	+23	25	Qualification for the Championship Group
4	Zhytlobud-1 Kharkiv	11	6	2	3	21	16	+5	20	Qualification for the Championship Group
5	Shakhtar Donetsk	11	6	1	4	32	13	+19	19	Qualification for the Championship Group
6	Ladomyr Volodymyr	11	5	3	3	22	21	+1	18	Qualification for the Championship Group
7	Dnipro-1	11	4	1	6	18	24	−6	13	Qualification for the Relegation Group
8	Dynamo Kyiv	11	3	3	5	12	24	−12	12	Qualification for the Relegation Group
9	EMS Podillia Vinnytsia	11	3	2	6	15	38	−23	11	Qualification for the Relegation Group
10	Veres Rivne	11	2	0	9	17	38	−21	6	Qualification for the Relegation Group
11	Pantery Uman	11	1	1	9	13	42	−29	4	Qualification for the Relegation Group
12	Mariupol	11	0	2	9	5	52	−47	2	Qualification for the Relegation Group

Source: womensfootball.com.ua
Rules for classification: 1) Points; 2) Head-to-head points; 3) Head-to-head goal difference; 4) Head-to-head goals scored; 5) Goal difference; 6) Goals scored.

=== Results ===
Home \ Away	DNI	LAD	MAR	KOL	PAN	POD	SHA	DYN	VOR	ZTL	KRY	VER
Dnipro-1			7–2	1–1	3–2	0–1	1–2			2–3		
Ladomyr Volodymyr	2–1			1–4		3–1		2–2	0–3	1–1		
Mariupol		0–5 (Note: Round 9 match scheduled to play on October 14 was postponed to November 10)			2–3				0–6		0–6	0–6
Kolos Kovalivka			8–0		6–1	5–0	2–1			1–0		1–0
Pantery Uman		2–4						1–4	0–5 (Note: Round 5 match scheduled to play on September 9 was postponed to November 8)		0–3	1–2
EMS Podillia Vinnytsia			1–1		3–3		1–4			0–1	0–5	5–3
Shakhtar Donetsk		0–0	8–0		7–0						2–3	7–2
Dynamo Kyiv	0–1		0–0	1–3		1–2 (Note: Round 9 match scheduled to play on October 14 was played earlier on September 23)	1–0					
Vorskla Poltava	8–0			2–0		12–1	0–1 (Note: Round 9 match scheduled to play on October 14 was postponed to November 14)	10–0				
Zhytlobud-1 Kharkiv			2–0		3–0		3–0	0–0	1–8			
Kryvbas Kryvyi Rih	2–0	6–2		1–0				4–0	0–0 (Note: Round 1 match scheduled to play on August 5 was postponed to August 23)	4–1 (Note: Round 5 match scheduled to play on September 9 was postponed to October 11)		
Veres Rivne	1–2	1–2						1–3	0–9	0–6	1–2	

Source: womensfootball.com.ua
Legend: Blue = home team win; Yellow = draw; Red = away team win.

=== Results by week ===
Team ╲ Round	1	2	3	4	5	6	7	8	9	10	11
Dnipro-1	W	W	W	L	L	L	L	L	D	W	L
Dynamo Kyiv	W	L	W	D	D	L	L	W	D	L	L
Kolos Kovalivka	W	L	W	W	W	L	W	W	D	W	W
Kryvbas Kryvyi Rih	W	W	D	W	W	W	W	W	W	W	W
Ladomyr Volodymyr	D	W	L	L	W	W	W	D	L	W	D
Mariupol	L	L	L	L	D	L	L	L	D	L	L
Pantery Uman	L	L	L	W	L	L	D	L	L	L	L
EMS Podillia Vinnytsia	L	L	L	L	L	W	W	W	D	D	L
Shakhtar Donetsk	W	L	L	W	W	W	L	W	L	W	D
Veres Rivne	L	W	L	L	L	L	L	L	L	L	W
Vorskla Poltava	W	W	D	W	W	W	W	W	W	L	W
Zhytlobud-1 Kharkiv	D	W	W	D	W	L	L	L	W	W	W

Source: womensfootball.com.ua
W = Win; D = Draw; L = Loss

== Statistics ==
=== Top scorers ===
As of 10 November 2023

Rank	Player	Club	Goals
1	(Ukraine) Roksolana Kravchuk	Vorskla Poltava	11
2	(Ukraine) Mariya Vykalyuk	Shakhtar Donetsk	10
2	(Ukraine) Viktoriya Hiryn	Ladomyr Volodymyr	10 (1)
4	(Ukraine) Nikol Kozlova	Vorskla Poltava	9 (1)
5	(Ukraine) Yana Kalinina	Vorskla Poltava	8
5	(Ukraine) Iryna Maiborodina	Kolos Kovalivka	8
5	(Ukraine) Polina Yanchuk	Kryvbas Kryvyi Rih	8
5	(Ukraine) Oksana Bilokur	Pantery Uman	8 (3)

=== Clean sheets ===
As of 18 November 2023

Rank	Player	Club	Clean sheets	MP
1	(Ukraine) Iryna Slavych	Zhytlobud-1 Kharkiv	6	540
2	(Ukraine) Daryna Bondarchuk	Vorskla Poltava	4	343
2	(Ukraine) Darya Kelyushyk	Kryvbas Kryvyi Rih	4	331
2	(Ukraine) Marina Dudnik	Kolos Kovalivka	4	287
5	2 players		3	<=270
7	5 players		2	<=180
13	9 players		1	<=90

== Championship round ==
=== Championship round table ===
Pos	Team	Pld	W	D	L	GF	GA	GD	Pts	
1	Vorskla Poltava (Note: Participant of the 2023 Ukrainian Women's Cup final.) (C)	21	17	3	1	94	5	+89	54	Qualification for Champions League second round
2	Kolos Kovalivka	21	13	4	4	41	18	+23	43	Qualification for Champions League first round
3	Kryvbas Kryvyi Rih	21	13	2	6	49	29	+20	41 (Note: Head-to-head results: Kryvbas – Zhytlobud-1 4:1, Kryvbas – Metalist 1925 2:2, Metalist 1925 – Kryvbas 3:1)	
4	Metalist 1925 Kharkiv	21	12	5	4	42	21	+21	41	
5	Shakhtar Donetsk	21	8	2	11	38	28	+10	26	
6	Ladomyr Volodymyr	21	6	3	12	30	55	−25	21	

Source: womensfootball.com.ua
Rules for classification: 1) Points; 2) Head-to-head points; 3) Head-to-head goal difference; 4) Head-to-head goals scored; 5) Goal difference; 6) Goals scored.
(C) Champions

=== Results ===
Home \ Away	KOL	KRY	LAD	SHA	VOR	MET
Kolos Kovalivka		2–1	3–1	0–0	0–0	0–1
Kryvbas Kryvyi Rih	0–2		4–3	2–0	1–2	2–2
Ladomyr Volodymyr	0–1	3–1		0–2	0–4	0–7
Shakhtar Donetsk	1–2	0–1	2–0		1–3	0–1
Vorskla Poltava	6–0	6–0	6–0	3–0		1–0
Metalist 1925 Kharkiv	0–0	3–1	4–1	3–0	0–0	

Source: WFPL.UA
Legend: Blue = home team win; Yellow = draw; Red = away team win.

== Relegation round ==
=== Relegation round table ===
Pos	Team	Pld	W	D	L	GF	GA	GD	Pts	
7	Dnipro-1	21	11	3	7	44	32	+12	36	Withdrew after the season
8	Dynamo Kyiv	21	10	4	7	41	33	+8	34	Withdrew after the season
9	EMS-Podillia Vinnytsia	21	9	4	8	30	52	−22	31	
10	Pantery Uman (O)	21	5	2	14	34	57	−23	17	Qualification to relegation play-offs
11	Veres Rivne (R)	21	2	3	16	21	61	−40	9	Qualification to relegation play-offs
12	Mariupol (R)	21	1	3	17	10	83	−73	6	Relegation to Persha Liha

Source: womensfootball.com.ua
Rules for classification: 1) Points; 2) Head-to-head points; 3) Head-to-head goal difference; 4) Head-to-head goals scored; 5) Goal difference; 6) Goals scored.
(O) Play-off winners; (R) Relegated

=== Results ===
Home \ Away	DNI	DYN	MAR	PAN	POD	VER
Dnipro-1		1–1	2–1	6–0	1–1	5–0
Dynamo Kyiv	2–3		8–0	3–2	5–0	1–0
Mariupol	0–3	1–4		0–4	0–4	1–1
Pantery Uman	1–2	0–1	4–0		3–0	6–1
EMS-Podillia Vinnytsia	2–1	2–1	1–0	2–1		2–1
Veres Rivne	0–2	0–3	0–2	0–0	1–1	

Source: WFPL.UA
Legend: Blue = home team win; Yellow = draw; Red = away team win.

== Relegation play-offs ==
Team 1	Agg.	Team 2	1st leg	2nd leg
First leg – June 1, Second leg – June 6
Pantery Uman	7 – 0	FC Mynai	3–0	4–0
Veres Rivne	2 – 3	Obolon Kyiv	1–1	1–2 (a.e.t.)

1 June 2024
16:00

Pantery Uman	3–0	FC Mynai
Myrhorodska 4'; Rybalkina 19'; Santos 52'	Report

Tsentralnyi, Uman
Referee: Nataliya Mamchur
6 June 2024
13:00

FC Mynai	0–4	Pantery Uman
	Report	Santos 21'; Tykhonova 31'; Roshka 33'; Bilokur 88' (pen.)

Mynai Arena, Mynai, Zakarpattia Oblast
Referee: Anastasia Romaniuk

1 June 2024
12:00

Veres Rivne	1–1	Obolon Kyiv
Lyakhovych 29'	Report	Vasylyuk 5'

Veres training base, Rivne
Referee: Anastasiya Romanyuk
6 June 2024
18:00

Obolon Kyiv	2–1 (a.e.t.)	Veres Rivne
Skiriak 56'; Kvach 102'	Report	Zabytivska 37'

Obolon Arena, Kyiv
Referee: Veronika Vasylchenko

== Persha Liha ==
=== Group A ===
Pos	Team	Pld	W	D	L	GF	GA	GD	Pts	
1	FC Mynai (C)	14	13	0	1	61	3	+58	39	Qualification to playoffs
2	Polissia Zhytomyr (P)	14	10	1	3	69	10	+59	31 (Note: Head-to-head results: Polissia 0–1 Prykarpattia DIuSSh-3, Prykarpattia DIuSSh-3 1–9 Polissia)	Qualification to playoffs
3	Prykarpattia-DIuSSh-3 Iv.Frankivsk	14	10	1	3	26	19	+7	31	
4	Ladomyr-2 Volodymyr	14	7	2	5	33	20	+13	23	
5	Nadbuzhia Busk	14	4	3	7	28	41	−13	15	
6	Iantarochka Novoiavorivsk	14	2	5	7	9	40	−31	11	Withdrew after the season
7	Rukh Lviv	14	3	1	10	22	46	−24	10	
8	DIuSSh-1 Khmelnytskyi	14	0	1	13	6	75	−69	1	

Source: womensfootball.com.ua
Rules for classification: 1) Points; 2) Head-to-head points; 3) Head-to-head goal difference; 4) Goal difference in all matches; 4) Goals scored in all matches; 6) Fair play.
(C) Champions; (P) Promoted

=== Group B ===
Pos	Team	Pld	W	D	L	GF	GA	GD	Pts	
1	Sisters Odesa (C, P)	14	13	1	0	124	3	+121	40	Qualification to play-offs
2	Obolon Kyiv (P)	14	12	1	1	52	11	+41	37	Qualification to play-offs
3	Yunist Chernihiv	14	8	1	5	56	26	+30	25	
4	Lider Kobeliaky	14	7	1	6	35	33	+2	22	
5	Ateks Kyiv	14	5	3	6	17	42	−25	18	
6	Kryvbas-2 Kryvyi Rih	14	3	1	10	15	26	−11	10	Withdrew
7	Zhaivir Shpola	14	2	1	11	5	71	−66	7	
8	Metalurh Zaporizhia	14	1	1	12	5	97	−92	4	Withdrew after the season

Source: womensfootball.com.ua
Rules for classification: 1) Points; 2) Head-to-head points; 3) Head-to-head goal difference; 4) Head-to-head goals scored; 5) Goal difference; 6) Goals scored.
(C) Champions; (P) Promoted

=== Play-offs ===
==== Semifinals ====
21 May 2024	Mynai	1–2	Obolon Kyiv	Bannikov Stadium
11:00	Yakymchuk 69'	Report	Vasylyuk 56'; Tsykalenko (red card) 73'; Boreiko 89'	Stadium: Kyiv; Referee: Lyudmyla Telbukh

21 May 2024	Sisters Odesa	4–1	Polissia Zhytomyr	Bannikov Stadium
15:00	Boychenko 6'; Da Costa 12'; Pidhorna 82'; Nesina 86'	Report	Azizova 54'	Stadium: Kyiv; Referee: Sofiya Prychyna

==== Third place ====
23 May 2024	Mynai	4–3 (a.e.t.)	Polissia Zhytomyr	Bannikov Stadium
11:00	Lespukh 35', 115', 120'; Shalimova 54'	Report	Nyzova (yellow card) 6' (yellow-red card) 23'; Tril 58'; Korniychuk 61'; Kyryk (red card) 68'; Sichkarenko 105'; Yaremchuk (yellow card) 71' (yellow-red card) 111'	Stadium: Kyiv; Referee: Kristina Kozoroh

==== First place ====
23 May 2024	Obolon Kyiv	0–2	Sisters Odesa	Bannikov Stadium
15:00		Report	Ngandi 10'; Boychenko 18'	Stadium: Kyiv; Referee: Lyudmyla Telbukh

== See also ==
- 2023–24 Ukrainian Premier League
- 2023 Ukrainian Women's Cup
