= 2017–18 Vyshcha Liha (women) =

Ukrainian Women's League
- Season: 2017–18
- Champions: Zhytlobud-1 Kharkiv
- Relegated: Ateks SDIuShOR-16 Kyiv; ~~Lehenda-ShVSM Chernihiv~~ (withdrew)
- UEFA Women's Champions League: Zhytlobud-1 Kharkiv

The 2017–18 season of the Ukrainian Championship Higher League was the 27th season of Ukraine's top women's football league. The season has shifted from spring-fall season to fall-spring. It took place from 18 August 2017 to 27 May 2018.

== Teams ==
Locations of teams in the 2017–18 Ukrainian Championship Higher League

=== Team changes ===
Promoted from 2017 to 2018 Persha Liha	Relegated from 2017 to 2018 Vyshcha Liha
Ladomyr Volodymyr-Volynskyi	none

=== Stadiums ===
Team	Home city	Home ground	Capacity
Iatran	Uman Raion	Tsentralnyi Raionyi Stadion	1,600
Iednist	Plysky	Iednist Stadion	1,500
Ladomyr	Volodymyr-Volynskyi	Olimp Stadion	2,000+
Ateks SDIuShOR-16	Vyshneve Kyiv	Munitsypalnyi Stadion Stadion of the School 231; KNUTE Stadion	
Pantery	Uman	Stadion Umanfermmash	
Zlahoda-Dnipro-1	Dnipro	Stadion Trudovi Rezervy; Molodizhnyi Stadion	
Rodyna	Mlyniv Kostopil	Stadion Kolos Stadion Kolos	
Lehenda-ShVSM	Chernihiv	Stadion Tekstylschyk	3,000
Zhytlobud-1	Liubotyn	Stadion Olimpiyets	
Zhytlobud-2	Kharkiv	Sonyachny Stadium	4,924

== League table ==
Pos	Team	Pld	W	D	L	GF	GA	GD	Pts	Qualification or relegation
1	Zhytlobud-1 Kharkiv (Note: Participant of the 2017–18 Ukrainian Women's Cup final.)	18	17	1	0	110	4	+106	52	Qualification to Champions League
2	Zhytlobud-2 Kharkiv	18	16	1	1	104	5	+99	49	
3	Lehenda-ShVSM Chernihiv	18	11	2	5	51	26	+25	35	Merged
4	Iatran Berestivets	18	10	4	4	31	20	+11	34	
5	Iednist Plysky	18	6	3	9	21	32	−11	21	
6	Pantery Uman	18	6	2	10	37	44	−7	20	
7	Zlahoda-Dnipro-1	18	5	4	9	15	55	−40	19	
8	Ladomyr Volodymyr-Volynskyi	18	5	3	10	28	49	−21	18	
9	Rodyna Kostopil	18	1	5	12	10	55	−45	8	
10	Ateks SDIuShOR-16 Kyiv	18	0	1	17	6	123	−117	−2	Relegation to Persha Liha

Source: womensfootball.com.ua
Rules for classification: 1) Points; 2) Head-to-head points; 3) Head-to-head goal difference; 4) Head-to-head goals scored; 5) Goal difference; 6) Goals scored.

=== Results ===
Home \ Away	ATK	IAT	IED	LAD	LCH	PAN	ROD	ZH1	ZH2	ZD1
Ateks SDIuShOR-16 Kyiv	—	2–5	0–4	0–9	0–5	1–2	0–0	0–10	0–22	1–3
Iatran Berestivets	5–0	—	2–0	1–1	1–0	3–1	1–0	1–2	0–1	1–1
Iednist Plysky	4–0	0–2	—	1–2	2–2	1–0	1–0	0–3	1–3	3–0
Ladomyr Volodymyr-Volynskyi	4–0	1–4	1–0	—	1–2	2–5	2–0	0–3	0–5	0–2
Lehenda-ShVSM Chernihiv	17–0	0–0	2–0	4–2	—	5–2	2–0	0–1	1–4	2–0
Pantery Uman	9–0	1–2	1–1	5–1	1–4	—	1–1	1–3	0–2	0–2
Rodyna Kostopil	4–1	0–0	0–2	1–1	1–2	0–3	—	1–10	0–7	1–1
Zhytlobud-1 Kharkiv	15–0	6–0	5–0	7–0	4–0	9–0	11–0	—	0–0	11–0
Zhytlobud-2 Kharkiv	+:-	4–0	8–0	8–0	7–0	7–0	8–0	1–3	—	8–0
Zlahoda-Dnipro-1	2–1	0–3	1–1	1–1	0–3	0–5	2–1	0–7	0–6	—

Source: WFPL.UA
Legend: Blue = home team win; Yellow = draw; Red = away team win.

=== Top scorers ===
As of 27 May 2018

Rank	Player	Club	Goals
1	(Ukraine) Olha Ovdiychuk	Zhytlobud-1 Kharkiv	28 (3)
2	(Ukraine) Yana Kalinina	Zhytlobud-2 Kharkiv	27
3	(Ukraine) Anna Voronina	Zhytlobud-1 Kharkiv	23
4	(Ukraine) Maria Mykhailiuk	Lehenda-ShVSM Chernihiv	18
5	(Ukraine) Oksana Bilokur	Pantery Uman	15
6	(Ukraine) Veronika Andrukhiv	Zhytlobud-2 Kharkiv	11
7	(Ukraine) Olena Lymar	Lehenda-ShVSM Chernihiv	10
7	(Ukraine) Tayisia Nesterenko	Zhytlobud-1 Kharkiv	10
7	(Ukraine) Yulia Shevchuk	Zhytlobud-1 Kharkiv	10
7	(Ukraine) Daryna Apanashchenko	Zhytlobud-1 Kharkiv	10 (1)

== Persha Liha ==
=== Group 1 ===
Pos	Team	Pld	W	D	L	GF	GA	GD	Pts	
1	Iantarochka Novoyavorivsk	6	4	1	1	19	5	+14	13	Qualified to Persha Liha play-offs
2	Kolos-Mriya	6	4	1	1	18	5	+13	13	Qualified to Persha Liha play-offs
3	Polissia Zhytomyr	6	2	0	4	7	15	−8	3	
4	Ateks-Obolon Kyiv	6	1	0	5	3	22	−19	3	

Source: womensfootball.com.ua
Rules for classification: 1) Points; 2) Head-to-head points; 3) Head-to-head goal difference; 4) Head-to-head goals scored; 5) Goal difference; 6) Goals scored.

=== Group 2 ===
Pos	Team	Pld	W	D	L	GF	GA	GD	Pts	
1	Voskhod Velyka Bahachka	6	5	0	1	33	9	+24	15	Qualified to Persha Liha play-offs
2	VO DYuSSh Vinnytsia	6	4	1	1	25	8	+17	13	
3	Orion-Avto Mykolaiv	6	1	2	3	10	13	−3	2	
4	Bahira Kropyvnytskyi	6	0	1	5	5	43	−38	1	

Source: womensfootball.com.ua
Rules for classification: 1) Points; 2) Head-to-head points; 3) Head-to-head goal difference; 4) Head-to-head goals scored; 5) Goal difference; 6) Goals scored.

=== Group 3 ===
Pos	Team	Pld	W	D	L	GF	GA	GD	Pts	
1	Mariupolchanka Mariupol	4	4	0	0	29	2	+27	12	Qualified to Persha Liha play-offs
2	SumDU-Barsa Sumy	4	1	0	3	9	14	−5	3	
3	Luhanochka-Spartak	4	1	0	3	4	26	−22	3	

Source: womensfootball.com.ua
Rules for classification: 1) Points; 2) Head-to-head points; 3) Head-to-head goal difference; 4) Head-to-head goals scored; 5) Goal difference; 6) Goals scored.

=== Play-offs ===
==== Semifinals ====
Team 1	Score	Team 2
Iantarochka	2 – 1	Kolos
Voskhod	3 – 2	Mariupolchanka

Voskhod Velyka Bahachka and Iantarochka Novoyavorivsk gained promotion to the Ukrainian Women's League. Later Iantarochka yielded its place to WFC Lviv.

==== Third place ====
Team 1	Score	Team 2
Kolos	0 – 8	Mariupolchanka

==== Final ====
Team 1	Score	Team 2
Iantarochka	0 – 3	Voskhod

Voskhod Velyka Bahachka was crown as the champions of the 2017–18 Persha Liha.
