= Vera Djatel =

Ukrainian footballer

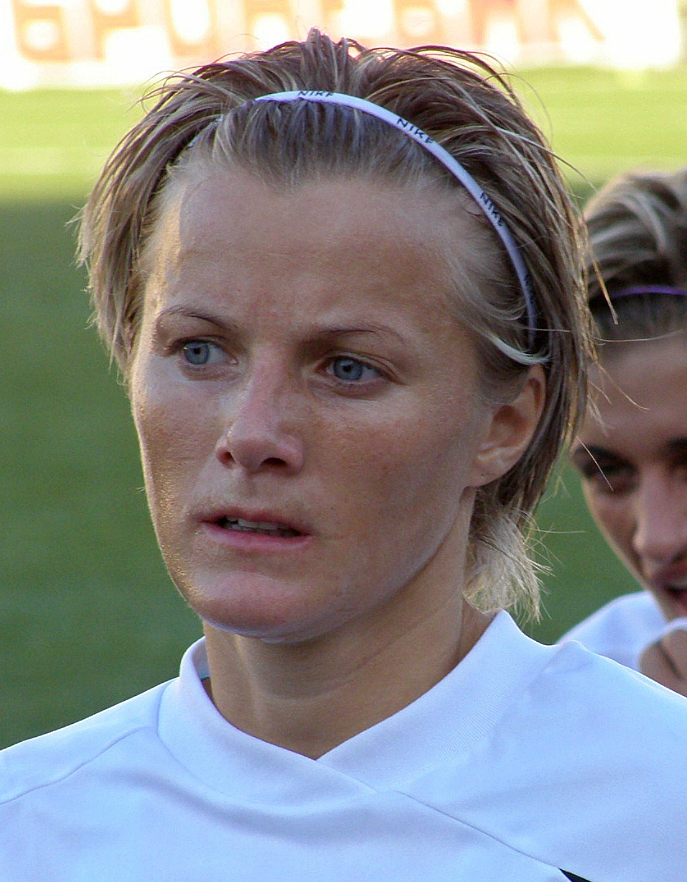

Personal information
- Full name: Vera Grigoryevna Djatel
- Date of birth: 3 March 1984 (age 42)
- Place of birth: Chernihiv, Ukrainian SSR, Soviet Union
- Height: 1.61 m (5 ft 3 in)
- Position: Midfielder

Youth career
- ????–1999: DYuSSh Horodnia

Senior career*
Years	Team	Apps	(Gls)
1999–2002	Lehenda Chernihiv	32	(18)
2003–2007	Zhytlobud-1 Kharkiv	61	(41)
2008–2012	Zvezda Perm	58	(21)
2012–2014	Zorky Krasnogorsk	50	(6)
2015–2016	Linköpings FC	9	(0)
2016	Sporting de Huelva	14	(2)
2017–2018	Zhytlobud-2 Kharkiv		
2018–2019	Sporting de Huelva		

International career^{‡}
2009–2019	Ukraine	37	(15)
- * Club domestic league appearances and goals as of 28 September 2016 ‡ National team caps and goals as of 30 January 2014

Vera Grigoryevna Djatel (Ukrainian: Віра Григорівна Дятел, romanized: Vira Hryhorivna Diatel; also transliterated Dyatel; born 3 March 1984) is a Ukrainian international football midfielder who most recently played for Sporting de Huelva. Besides regular association football, Djatel plays futsal variation.

She previously played for Swedish Damallsvenskan club Linköpings FC, Lehenda Chernihiv and Zhytlobud Kharkiv in the Ukrainian League, as well as Zvezda Perm and Zorky Krasnogorsk in the Russian Championship.

== Club career ==
Djatel started her football career in a small city of Horodnia near Chernihiv playing for a local sports school (DYuSSh). Sometime around 2000, she started to play for the Ukrainian major women club from Chernihiv, Lehenda and eventually Djatel ended up at the even more successful Kharkiv's Zhytlobud-1 which at that time was known as Metalist and Arsenal (WFC Arsenal Kharkiv). Before joining the Kharkiv team, Djatel already had three national titles by playing for Lehenda Chernihiv.

In 2008 Djatel moved to the Russian Federation where she played until 2015. Djatel helped Zvezda reach the 2009 UEFA Women's Cup Final with three goals in the quarter-final and semi-final ties against Brøndby and Umeå. She won two Russian leagues with Zvezda.

In January 2015 Djatel joined Linköpings FC of Sweden, who had been trying to sign her for several years. She suffered an injury in August 2015 and left Linköpings in July 2016 after failing to reclaim her place in the team.

She moved to Spanish Primera División club Sporting de Huelva for the 2016–17 season, but agreed to terminate her contract in December 2016 after suffering from tendinitis in her knees.

== International career ==
Djatel debuted for Ukraine against England in November 2000 and later represented her country at UEFA Women's Euro 2009. A starter in all three games, she assisted Daryna Apanaschenko for Ukraine's first goal in the tournament against Denmark.

Djatel represented her country in the final tournaments of both the UEFA Women's Euros and UEFA Women's Futsal Championship, finishing runners-up in the latter with Ukraine in 2023.

== Official international goals ==
- 2005 European Championship qualification
  - 1 in Ukraine 1–0 Scotland
- 2009 European Championship qualification
  - 1 in Slovakia 0–4 Ukraine
  - 1 in Ukraine 2–0 Slovenia (play-offs)
- 2011 World Cup qualification
  - 1 in Ukraine 7–0 Bosnia and Herzegovina
  - 1 in Bosnia 0–5 Ukraine
- 2013 European Championship qualification
  - 2 in Estonia 1–4 Ukraine
  - 1 in Slovakia 0–2 Ukraine
  - 1 in Belarus 0–5 Ukraine

== Honours ==
Lehenda Chernihiv

- Ukrainian Women's League (3) 2000, 2001, 2002
- Women's Cup (2) 2001, 2002

Zvezda Perm

- Russian Leagues (2) 2008, 2009
- Russian Women's Cup (2) 2007, 2012

Linköpings FC

- Damallsvenskan (1) 2016

Zhytlobud-2 Kharkiv

- Ukrainian Women's League (2) 2017–18, 2018–19, 2019–20

Individual

- UEFA Women's Champions League top scorer: 2007–08 (9 goals)
