= 2018–19 Vyshcha Liha (women) =

Ukrainian Women's League
- Season: 2018-19
- Champions: Zhytlobud-1 Kharkiv
- Relegated: ~~WFC Lviv~~ (withdrew); ~~Zlahoda-Dnipro-1~~ (withdrew)
- UEFA Women's Champions League: Zhytlobud-1 Kharkiv

The 2018–19 season of the Ukrainian Championship Higher League was the 28th season of Ukraine's top women's football league. It took place from 3 August 2018 to 1 June 2019.

== Teams ==
Locations of teams in the 2018–19 Ukrainian Championship Higher League

=== Team changes ===
Promoted	Relegated
Voskhod Stara Maiachka; WFC Lviv (Note: Lviv was admitted to the league without fielding a team in previous season (replaced Iantarochka Novoiavorivsk).)	Lehenda-ShVSM Chernihiv (merged); Ateks SDIuShOR-16 Kyiv

=== Name changes ===
- Iednist-ShVSM Plysky was known last season as Iednist Plysky (merged with Lehenda-ShVSM)

=== Stadiums ===
Team	Home city	Home ground	Capacity
Iatran	Uman Raion	Tsentralnyi Raionyi Stadion	1,600
Iednist	Plysky	Iednist Stadion	1,500
Ladomyr	Volodymyr-Volynskyi	Olimp Stadion	2,000+
Lviv	Novoiavorivsk	Stadion imeni Rusyna	
Pantery Uman	Uman	Stadion Umanfermmash	
Zlahoda-Dnipro-1	Dnipro	Molodizhnyi Stadion	
Rodyna	Berezne	Stadion Kolos	3,000
Voskhod	Beryslav	Stadion Mashynobudivnyk	
Zhytlobud-1	Liubotyn	Stadion Olimpiyets	
Zhytlobud-2	Kharkiv	Sonyachny Stadium	4,924

== Vyshcha Liha ==
Pos	Team	Pld	W	D	L	GF	GA	GD	Pts	Qualification or relegation
1	Zhytlobud-1 Kharkiv (Note: Participant of the 2018–19 Ukrainian Women's Cup final.) (C, Q)	18	18	0	0	110	1	+109	54	Qualification to Champions League
2	Zhytlobud-2 Kharkiv	18	16	0	2	115	6	+109	48	
3	Voskhod Stara Maiachka	18	10	2	6	31	31	0	32	
4	WFC Lviv	18	9	2	7	39	38	+1	29	Withdrew after the season
5	Iednist Plysky	18	9	2	7	39	35	+4	29	
6	Ladomyr Volodymyr-Volynskyi	18	7	1	10	24	45	−21	22	
7	Iatran Berestivets	18	4	5	9	16	25	−9	17	
8	Rodyna Kostopil	18	4	2	12	14	59	−45	14	
9	Pantery Uman	18	3	1	14	14	83	−69	10	
10	Zlahoda-Dnipro-1 (O)	18	2	1	15	18	97	−79	7	Qualification to relegation play-offs

Source: WFPL.ua
Rules for classification: 1) Points; 2) Head-to-head points; 3) Head-to-head goal difference; 4) Head-to-head goals scored; 5) Goal difference; 6) Goals scored.
(C) Champions; (O) Play-off winners; (Q) Qualified for the phase indicated

=== Results ===
Home \ Away	IAT	IED	LAD	LVI	PAN	ZD1	ROD	VSM	ZH1	ZH2
Iatran Berestivets	—	0–1	3–2	0–0	1–1	1–1	0–0	0–2	0–2	0–5
Iednist Plysky	0–0	—	4–1	1–1	4–0	3–2	2–0	1–2	1–3	1–7
Ladomyr Volodymyr-Volynskyi	1–0	3–2	—	2–1	3–0	4–2	2–0	1–1	0–1	0–6
WFC Lviv	1–0	4–2	2–0	—	7–1	1–2	2–0	5–1	0–6	2–5
Pantery Uman	0–5	0–3	1–0	0–6	—	2–1	1–2	1–3	0–12	0–7
Zlahoda-Dnipro-1	0–4	0–8	4–1	2–3	3–6	—	0–6	-:+	0–15	-:+
Rodyna Kostopil	0–2	0–5	0–3	0–3	3–1	2–1	—	1–1	0–7	0–9
Voskhod Stara Maiachka	1–0	0–1	3–0	2–1	2–0	8–0	2–0	—	0–4	0–4
Zhytlobud-1 Kharkiv	3–0	7–0	11–0	7–0	8–0	8–0	11–0	3–0	—	1–0
Zhytlobud-2 Kharkiv	5–0	5–0	4–1	7–0	13–0	19–0	7–0	9–0	0–1	—

Source: WFPL.UA
Legend: Blue = home team win; Yellow = draw; Red = away team win.

=== Top scorers ===
As of 1 June 2019

Rank	Player	Club	Goals
1	(Ukraine) Olha Ovdiychuk	Zhytlobud-1 Kharkiv	30 (3)
2	(Ukraine) Yana Kalinina	Zhytlobud-2 Kharkiv	22
3	(Ukraine) Tetiana Poliukhovych	Zhytlobud-2 Kharkiv	20 (7)
4	(Ukraine) Yana Malakhova	Zhytlobud-2 Kharkiv	19
5	(Ukraine) Veronika Andrukhiv	Zhytlobud-2 Kharkiv	18
6	(Ukraine) Daryna Apanashchenko	Zhytlobud-1 Kharkiv	17 (1)
7	(Ukraine) Yulia Shevchuk	Zhytlobud-1 Kharkiv	13
8	(Ukraine) Hanna Mozolska	Zhytlobud-1 Kharkiv	11
9	(Ukraine) Alina Skydan	Iednist Plysky	10 (2)
9	(Ukraine) Yulia Stets	Voskhod Stara Maiachka	10 (2)

=== Relegation play-offs ===
The drawing for relegation playoff took place on 13 June 2019.

Team 1	Agg.	Team 2	1st leg	2nd leg
SC Vyshneve	w/o	Zlahoda-Dnipro-1		

Zlahoda-Dnipro-1 won on walkover and has preserved its berth in the Ukrainian Women's League. SC Vyshneve withdrew from league competitions. Later SC Dnipro-1 informed the Ukrainian Association of Football that it will not field its female team next season.

== Persha Liha ==
=== Group A ===
Pos	Team	Pld	W	D	L	GF	GA	GD	Pts	
1	VO DYuSSH Vinnytsia	10	8	0	2	33	8	+25	24	Qualified to Persha Liha play-offs
2	Karpaty Lviv	10	7	0	3	40	17	+23	21	Qualified to Persha Liha play-offs
3	Stanislavchanka-DYuSSh-3	10	6	1	3	21	16	+5	19	
4	Iantarochka Novoyavorivsk	10	3	2	5	10	30	−20	11	
5	Bukovynska Nadia	10	3	0	7	21	36	−15	9	
6	Kolos-Mriya	10	1	1	8	9	27	−18	4	

Source: womensfootball.com.ua
Rules for classification: 1) Points; 2) Head-to-head points; 3) Head-to-head goal difference; 4) Head-to-head goals scored; 5) Goal difference; 6) Goals scored.

=== Group B ===
Pos	Team	Pld	W	D	L	GF	GA	GD	Pts	
1	Mariupolchanka	8	6	2	0	34	2	+32	20	Qualified to Persha Liha play-offs
2	SC Vyshneve	8	6	1	1	29	5	+24	19	Qualified to Persha Liha play-offs
3	Ateks-SDYuShOR-16	8	4	0	4	18	15	+3	9	
4	Polissia Zhytomyr (Note: Polissia Zhytomyr was expelled from the league for failing to appear for games repeatedly.)	8	1	1	6	7	18	−11	1	Expelled
5	Luhanochka-Spartak	8	1	0	7	4	52	−48	0	

Source: womensfootball.com.ua
Rules for classification: 1) Points; 2) Head-to-head points; 3) Head-to-head goal difference; 4) Head-to-head goals scored; 5) Goal difference; 6) Goals scored.

=== Play-offs ===
==== Semifinals ====
Team 1	Score	Team 2
VO DYuSSh	4 – 1	Vyshneve
Karpaty	1 – 4	Mariupolchanka

VO DYuSSh Vinnytsia and Mariupolchanka Mariupol gained promotion to the Ukrainian Women's League.

==== Third place ====
Team 1	Score	Team 2
Vyshneve	3 – 1	Karpaty

SC Vyshneve qualified for promotion/relegation play-offs.

==== Final ====
Team 1	Score	Team 2
VO DYuSSh	0 – 4	Mariupolchanka

Mariupolchanka Mariupol was crown as the champions of the 2018–19 Persha Liha.
