= 2019–20 Vyshcha Liha (women) =

Ukrainian Women's League
- Season: 2019–20
- Champions: Zhytlobud-2 Kharkiv
- Relegated: Iednist, Iatran, Rodyna (all withdrew)
- UEFA Women's Champions League: Zhytlobud-2 Kharkiv
- Goals: 18 – Yulia Stets (Voskhod)
- Biggest home win: Zhytlobud-1 11–0 Mariupolchanka
- Biggest away win: Rodyna 0–12 Zhytlobud-2; Mariupolchanka 0–12 Zhytlobud-1

The 2019–20 season of the Ukrainian Championship Higher League was the 29th season of Ukraine's top women's football league. It started on 20 July 2019. The season was scheduled to end on 30 May 2020, but due to the COVID-19 pandemic, the tournament ended on 31 July 2020.

Due to the COVID-19 pandemic across the globe, the spring portion of the competition was suspended. Finally in early July 2020, the UAF Executive Committee approved continuation of the Women's Top Division as per the existing season's regulations and pre-cautionary health security measures that were adopted in Ukraine in late May 2020.

== Teams ==
Locations of teams in the 2019–20 Ukrainian Championship Higher League

=== Team changes ===
Promoted from 2018 to 2019 Persha Liha	Relegated from 2018 to 2019 Vyshcha Liha
Mariupilchanka Mariupol; EMS Podillia Vinnytsia	Zlahoda-Dnipro-1 (dissolved); WFC Lviv (dissolved)

=== Name changes ===
- EMS Podillia Vinnytsia last season was known as Vinnytsia Oblast DYuSSh
- Spartak-Orion Mykolaiv last season was known as Orion-Avto Mykolaiv
- Inviktus Kyiv that last season was known as SC Vyshneve changed its name to Kolos Kovalivka
- Prykarpattia-DYuSSh-3 last season was known as Stanislavchanka-DYuSSh-3
- Ateks Kyiv last season was known as Ateks-SDYuShOR-16

=== Stadiums ===
Team	Home city	Home ground	Capacity
Iatran	Uman Raion	Stadion Maximus	352
Iednist	Plysky	Iednist Stadion	1,500
Ladomyr	Volodymyr-Volynskyi	Olimp Stadion	2,000+
Mariupilchanka	Mariupol	Zakhidnyi Stadion	3,206
Pantery Uman	Uman	Tsentralny Stadion	7,552
EMS Podillia	Vinnytsia	Nyva Stadion	3,282
Rodyna	Berezne	Stadion Kolos	3,000
Voskhod	Oleshky	Stadion Start	
Zhytlobud-1	Vysokyi	Training field Vysokyi	
Zhytlobud-2	Kharkiv	Sonyachny Stadium	4,924

=== Managers ===
Club	Head coach	Replaced coach
Iednist Plysky	(Ukraine) Maksym Rakhayev	Oleksandr Babor
Mariupolchanka	(Ukraine) Karina Kulakovska	
Ladomyr Volodymyr-Volynskyi	(Ukraine) Oleh Bornik	
EMS Podillia Vinnytsia	(Ukraine) Oleksandr Dudnik	
Rodyna Kostopil	(Ukraine) Vasyl Mamchur	
Pantery Uman	(Ukraine) Yuriy Dereniuk	
Iatran Berestivets	(Ukraine) Volodymyr Peiu	
Voskhod Stara Maiachka	(Ukraine) Roman Zayev	
Zhytlobud-1 Kharkiv	(Ukraine) Serhiy Sapronov	Maksym Rakhayev (interim)
Zhytlobud-2 Kharkiv	(Ukraine) Nataliya Zinchenko	

== League table ==
Pos	Team	Pld	W	D	L	GF	GA	GD	Pts	Qualification or relegation
1	Zhytlobud-2 Kharkiv (Note: Participant of the 2019–20 Ukrainian Women's Cup final.) (C)	18	17	0	1	100	5	+95	51	Qualification to Champions League
2	Zhytlobud-1 Kharkiv	18	15	2	1	67	5	+62	47	
3	Voskhod Stara Maiachka	18	11	2	5	44	28	+16	35	
4	Iatran Berestivets	18	7	4	7	19	34	−15	25	Withdrew after the season
5	Iednist-ShVSM Plysky	18	8	0	10	32	17	+15	24	Withdrew, later relegated
6	Pantery Uman	18	6	3	9	21	57	−36	21	
7	Mariupilchanka	18	5	1	12	15	82	−67	16	
8	Ladomyr Volodymyr-Volynskyi	18	4	2	12	19	33	−14	14	Withdrew, later returned
9	EMS Podillia Vinnytsia	18	2	4	12	15	30	−15	10	Withdrew, later returned
10	Rodyna Kostopil	18	0	2	16	4	45	−41	2	Withdrew, later relegated

Source: PFL.ua
Rules for classification: 1) Points; 2) Head-to-head points; 3) Head-to-head goal difference; 4) Head-to-head goals scored; 5) Goal difference; 6) Goals scored.
(C) Champions

== Results ==
Home \ Away	IAT	IED	LAD	MAR	PAN	POD	ROD	VSM	ZH1	ZH2
Iatran Berestivets	—	3–1	1–2	4–1	2–2	+:-	2–0	0–2	-:+	0–8
Iednist-ShVSM Plysky	3–1	—	-:-	4–0	-:+	3–0	-:-	2–1	0–3	0–8
Ladomyr Volodymyr-Volynskyi	-:+	0–3	—	3–1	6–2	-:-	4–1	1–5	-:+	0–7
Mariupilchanka	1–1	0–11	+:-	—	1–3	2–3	+:-	2–6	0–12	0–9
Pantery Uman	0–3	1–2	+:-	3–4	—	4–3	1–1	0–2	0–10	0–7
EMS Podillia Vinnytsia	1–1	-:-	2–2	-:+	1–1	—	-:-	0–4	1–1	-:+
Rodyna Kostopil	-:+	0–3	0–0	0–2	-:+	1–3	—	1–2	-:+	0–12
Voskhod Stara Maiachka	1–1	+:-	5–1	5–0	6–1	4–1	+:-	—	1–1	1–8
Zhytlobud-1 Kharkiv	4–0	+:-	6–0	11–0	5–0	+:-	7–0	2–0	—	2–1
Zhytlobud-2 Kharkiv	5–0	+:-	+:-	7–1	6–0	7–0	9–0	4–1	2–0	—

Source: WFPL.UA
Legend: Blue = home team win; Yellow = draw; Red = away team win.

== Top scorers ==
As of 15 July 2020

Rank	Player	Club	Goals
1	(Ukraine) Yulia Stets	Voskhod Stara Maiachka	18 (1)
2	(Ukraine) Veronika Andrukhiv	Zhytlobud-2 Kharkiv	14
2	(Ukraine) Yana Kalinina	Zhytlobud-2 Kharkiv	14
4	(Ukraine) Nadiia Kunina	Zhytlobud-1 Kharkiv	12
5	(Ukraine) Yana Malakhova	Zhytlobud-2 Kharkiv	11
6	(Ukraine) Anastasia Skorynina	Zhytlobud-2 Kharkiv	10
7	(Ukraine) Viktoria Hirin	Ladomyr Volodymyr-Volynskyi	8
8	(Ukraine) Yulia Khrystiuk	EMS Podillia Vinnytsia	7
8	(Ukraine) Tetyana Kitayeva	Zhytlobud-2 Kharkiv	7
8	(Ukraine) Yulia Shevchuk	Zhytlobud-1 Kharkiv	7
8	(Ukraine) Nadia Veherych	Iednist Plysky	7
8	(Ukraine) Oksana Bilokur	Pantery Uman	7 (1)

== Persha Liha ==
=== Group A ===
Pos	Team	Pld	W	D	L	GF	GA	GD	Pts	
1	Karpaty Lviv	4	4	0	0	18	6	+12	12	Promoted to Vyshcha Liha
2	Bukovynska Nadia	4	1	2	1	8	9	−1	5	Promoted to Vyshcha Liha
3	Kolos-Mriya Makhnivka	4	1	2	1	5	10	−5	5	
4	Lviv-Yantarochka	4	1	0	3	4	8	−4	3	
5	Prykarpattia-DYuSSh-3	4	0	2	2	5	7	−2	2	

Source: womensfootball.com.ua
Rules for classification: 1) Points; 2) Head-to-head points; 3) Head-to-head goal difference; 4) Head-to-head goals scored; 5) Goal difference; 6) Goals scored.

=== Group B ===
Pos	Team	Pld	W	D	L	GF	GA	GD	Pts	
1	Spartak-Orion Mykolaiv (Note: Upon promotion Spartak-Orion Mykolaiv changed its name to Nika. Previously it was also known as Orion-Avto Mykolaiv.)	4	4	0	0	11	0	+11	12	Promoted to Vyshcha Liha
2	Kolos Kovalivka (Note: In 2019 Kolos Kovalivka was called Inviktus and represented Kyiv. Last season it was playing as SC Vyshneve.)	4	3	0	1	27	7	+20	9	
3	KhPKSP-Zhytlobud-2	4	2	0	2	19	5	+14	6	
4	Ateks Kyiv	4	1	0	3	13	13	0	3	
5	Luhanochka	4	0	0	4	1	46	−45	0	

Source: womensfootball.com.ua
Rules for classification: 1) Points; 2) Head-to-head points; 3) Head-to-head goal difference; 4) Head-to-head goals scored; 5) Goal difference; 6) Goals scored.
