= Iryna Pidkuiko =

Ukrainian footballer

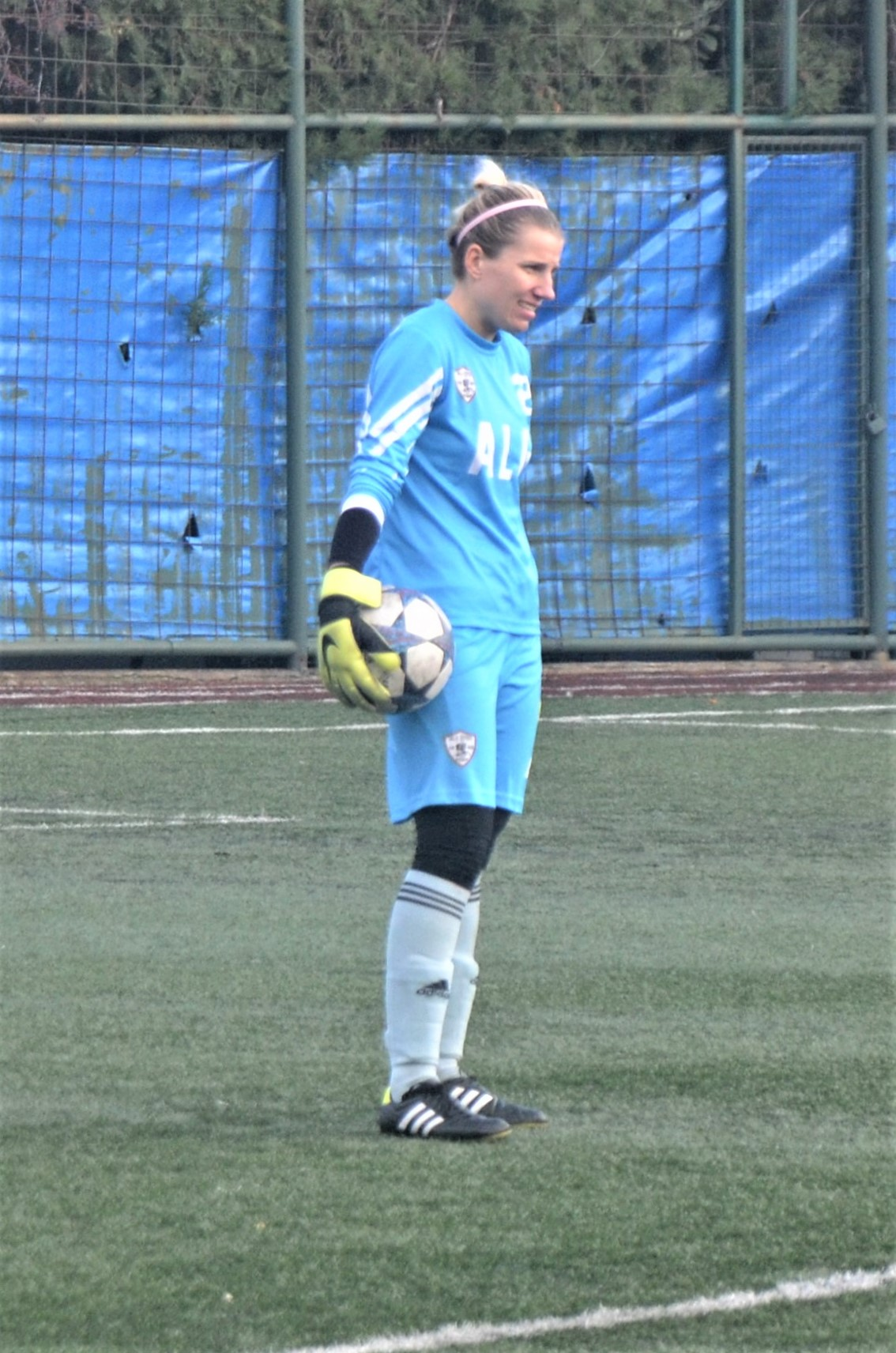
- Iryna Pidkuiko for ALG Spor (November 2018)

Personal information
- Date of birth: 18 June 1989 (age 37)
- Place of birth: Ukraine
- Position: Goalkeeper

Senior career*
Years	Team	Apps	(Gls)
2007	Ateks Kyiv	1	(0)
2008	Yatran Berestivets	11	(1)
2009–2011	Illichivka Mariupol	16	(0)
2012–2016	Zhytlobud-1	28	(0)
2017–2018	Pantery Uman	19	(2)
2018–2019	ALG Spor	8	(0)
- * Club domestic league appearances and goals as of 22 October 2025

Iryna Pidkuiko (Ukrainian: Ірина Підкуйко, born 18 June 1989) is a Ukrainian women's football goalkeeper. She played in the Turkish Women's First Football League for ALG Spor with jersey number 22. She was part of the Ukraine women's national U-19 team.

== Playing career ==
=== Club ===
Pidkuiko played in her country for FC Ateks-Sdushor-16 in Kyiv, WFC Zhytlobud-1 Kharkiv in Kharkiv, FC Illichivka Mariupol in Mariupol, WFC Panthery, and FC Yatran Uman in Uman. In 2012, she enjoyed champion title of the Ukrainian Women's League with her team WFC Zhytlobud-1 Kharkiv.

In 2018, Pidkuiko moved to Turkey, and signed with the Gaziantep-based club ALG Spor, which were recently promoted to the Women's First League. In 2022, Pidkuiko moved to CR, and 2023 signed with the club Dynamo Č. Budějovice

== Career statistics ==
As of match played >February 10, 2019.

Club	Season	League			Continental		National		Total	
Club	Season	Division	Apps	Goals	Apps	Goals	Apps	Goals	Apps	Goals
ALG Spor	2018–19	First League	8	0	–	–	0	0	8	0
ALG Spor	Total		8	0	-	-	0	0	8	0

== Honours ==
Ukrainian Women's League

WFC Zhytlobud-1 Kharkiv
Winners (1): 2012
