= Pantery Uman =

- Full name: Panthers Women's Football Club
- Founded: 2014
- Ground: Tsentralnyi Stadion, Uman
- Capacity: 7,552
- Manager: Yuriy Derenyuk
- League: Ukrainian Women's League
- 2024–25: 9th

WFC Pantery Uman (Ukrainian: ЖФК «Пантери») is a Ukrainian women's football club from Uman.

== History ==
=== Origin ===
Founded in 2014 as a local sports school in Uman DYuSSh-1 and competed for as a farm club of Yatran from Uman suburb of Berestivets. The football team was named as Pantery (Panthers). The team made its debut in the Ukrainian second tier competitions (First League) in 2014 and won the season's title.

=== Ukrainian Women's Cup ===
In 2016 the club qualified for the Semifinals of Ukrainian Women's Cup. After defeating Prykarpattia-DYuSSh3 Ivano-Frankivsk, the club was eliminated in the semifinals by Zhytlobud-1 Kharkiv.

=== Ukrainian Women's League ===
After winning the First League, it was admitted to the Ukrainian Women's League as an independent club in 2015. In 2017 a 16-year-old player of Pantery Liliya Mospan gave an interview about her club and football in general.

In summer 2017, the team participated in the debut Ukrainian women's beach soccer championship and they become the first-ever winners of the tournament.

In 2019, the Panthers set a new record for Ukraine, the team from Uman defeated Luhanochka Luhansk 29-1 in the match of the 1/8 finals of the Ukrainian Cup. This game went down in history as the Most productive match in the history of Ukraine.

== Stadium and facilities ==
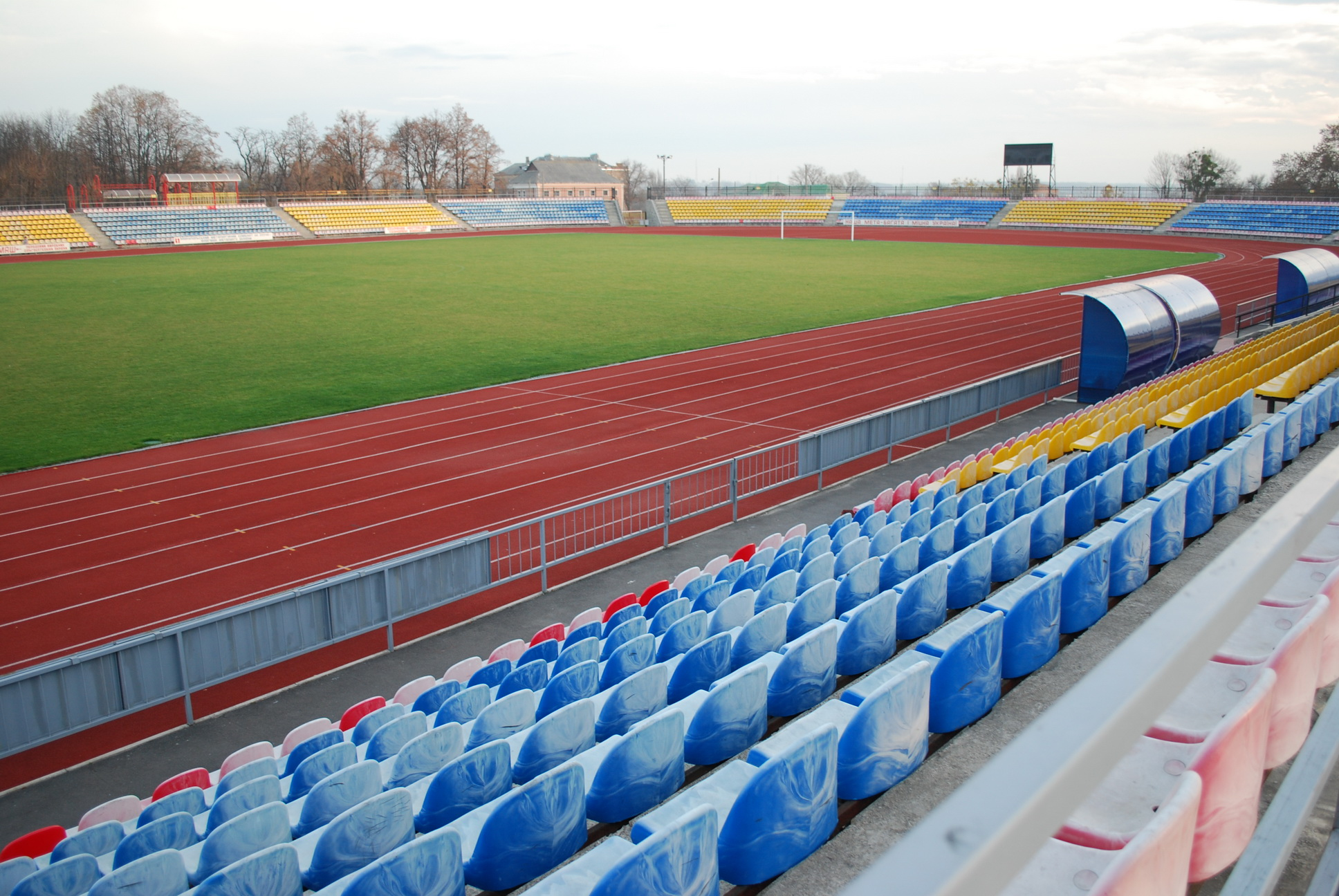
Tsentralnyi Stadion in Uman

The club play at the Tsentralnyi Stadion built in 1922 with a capacity of 7,552 spectators.

== Honours and distinctions ==
=== Domestic competitions ===
- Ukrainian Women's First League

Winners (1): 2015

- Ukrainian women's beach soccer

Winners (1): 2017

=== Individual Player & Coach awards ===
- Best Young Ukrainian Player

(Ukraine) Oksana Bilokurː 2017

== Players ==
=== Current squad ===
As of 19 October 2025 Note: Flags indicate national team as defined under FIFA eligibility rules; some limited exceptions apply. Players may hold more than one non-FIFA nationality.

| No. | Pos. | Nation | Player |
|---|---|---|---|
| 4 | DF | BRA | Roberta Lourdes |
| 7 | MF | UKR | Anna Mirgorodskaya |
| 8 | MF | UKR | Nikolaeva Ksenia |
| 9 | FW | UKR | Oksana Bilokur |
| 10 | DF | UKR | Iryna Rybalkina |
| 11 | DF | UKR | Camila Silva Dos Santos |
| 14 | DF | UKR | Diana Chernenko |
| 17 | MF | UKR | Yaryna Skiryak |
| 18 | MF | UKR | Maria Tikhonova |

| No. | Pos. | Nation | Player |
|---|---|---|---|
| 19 | MF | UKR | Valeria Kazina |
| 20 | FW | BRA | Nice Neves |
| 22 | GK | UKR | Veronika Gudzyk |
| 23 | MF | UKR | Lidia Lashko |
| 24 | MF | BRA | Letizia Camilotti |
| 27 | MF | UKR | Alina Svergun |
| 29 | MF | UKR | Lyubov Tsiluvanska |
| 81 | MF | UKR | Yana Kachur |
| 84 | MF | UKR | Krystyna Roshka |

=== Out on loan ===
Note: Flags indicate national team as defined under FIFA eligibility rules; some limited exceptions apply. Players may hold more than one non-FIFA nationality.

| No. / Pos. / Nation / Player | No. / Pos. / Nation / Player |

=== Other players under contract ===
Note: Flags indicate national team as defined under FIFA eligibility rules; some limited exceptions apply. Players may hold more than one non-FIFA nationality.

| No. / Pos. / Nation / Player | No. / Pos. / Nation / Player |

== Head coaches ==
- Yuriy Derenyuk
- Yuriy Alexandrovich

== League and cup history ==
| Season | Div. | Pos. | Pl. | W | D | L | GS | GA | P | Domestic Cup | Europe | Notes |
|---|---|---|---|---|---|---|---|---|---|---|---|---|
| 2016–17 | 1st | 5 | 8 | 3 | 2 | 3 | 11 | 14 | 11 | Semifinals | | |
| 2017–18 | 1st | 6 | 18 | 6 | 10 | 37 | 37 | 44 | 20 | | | |
| 2018–19 | 1st | 9 | 18 | 3 | 1 | 14 | 14 | 83 | 10 | Quarterfinals | | |
| 2019–20 | 1st | 6 | 18 | 6 | 3 | 9 | 21 | 57 | 21 | | | |
| 2020–21 | 1st | 9 | 9 | 3 | 0 | 6 | 10 | 27 | 9 | | | |
| 2021–22 | 1st | 10 | 22 | 2 | 0 | 8 | 10 | 46 | 6 | Round of 16 | | |
| 2022–23 | 1st | 11 | 22 | 5 | 2 | 15 | 20 | 75 | 17 | Round of 16 | | |
| 2023–24 | 1st | 11 | 11 | 1 | 1 | 9 | 13 | 42 | 4 | Round of 16 | | |
| 2024–25 | 1st | 8 | 10 | 2 | 1 | 7 | 7 | 40 | 7 | Qualifying round | | |
| 2025–26 | 1st | 8 | 26 | 8 | 4 | 14 | 26 | 52 | 28 | Quarter-finals | | |
| 2026–27 | 1st | 7 | 26 | 1 | 3 | 12 | 5 | 32 | 6 | | | |

== Notable players ==
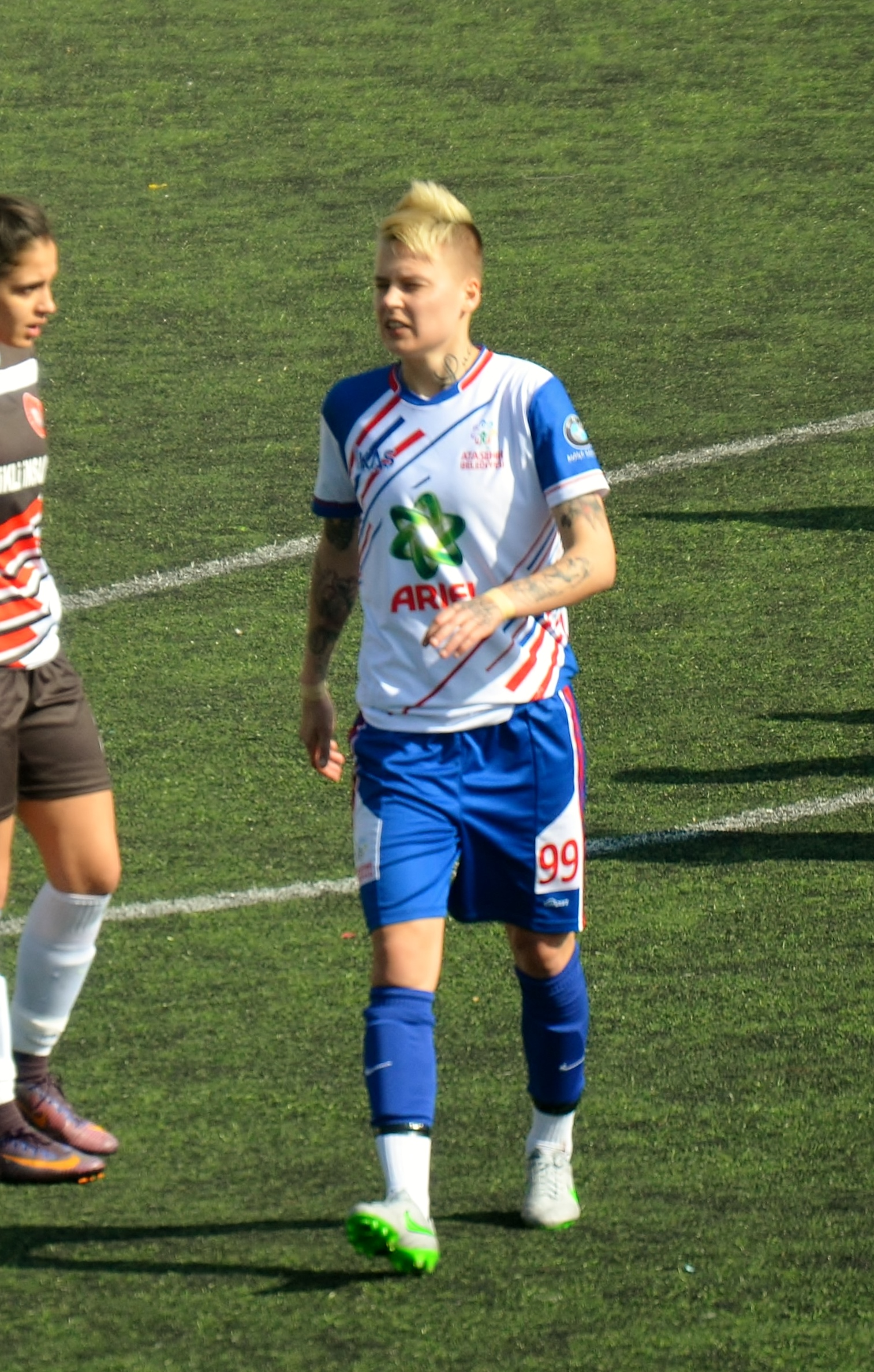
Tetyana Kozyrenko

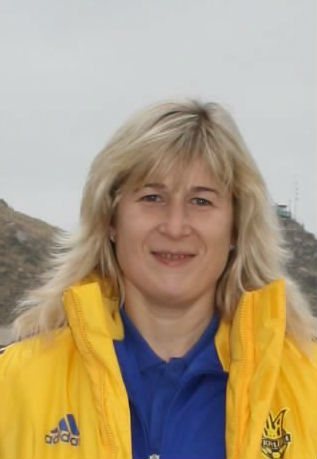
Svitlana Frishko

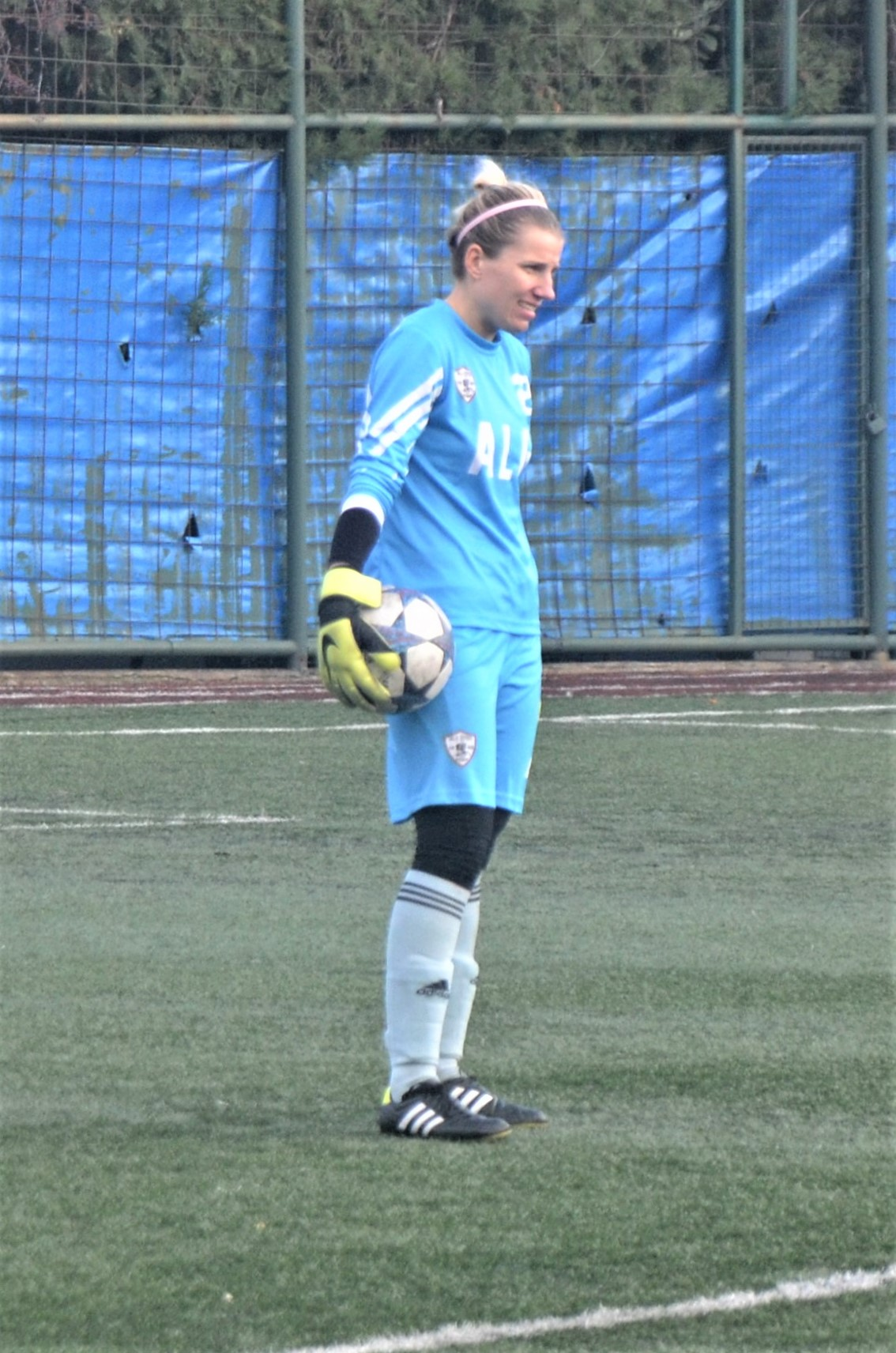
Iryna Pidkuiko

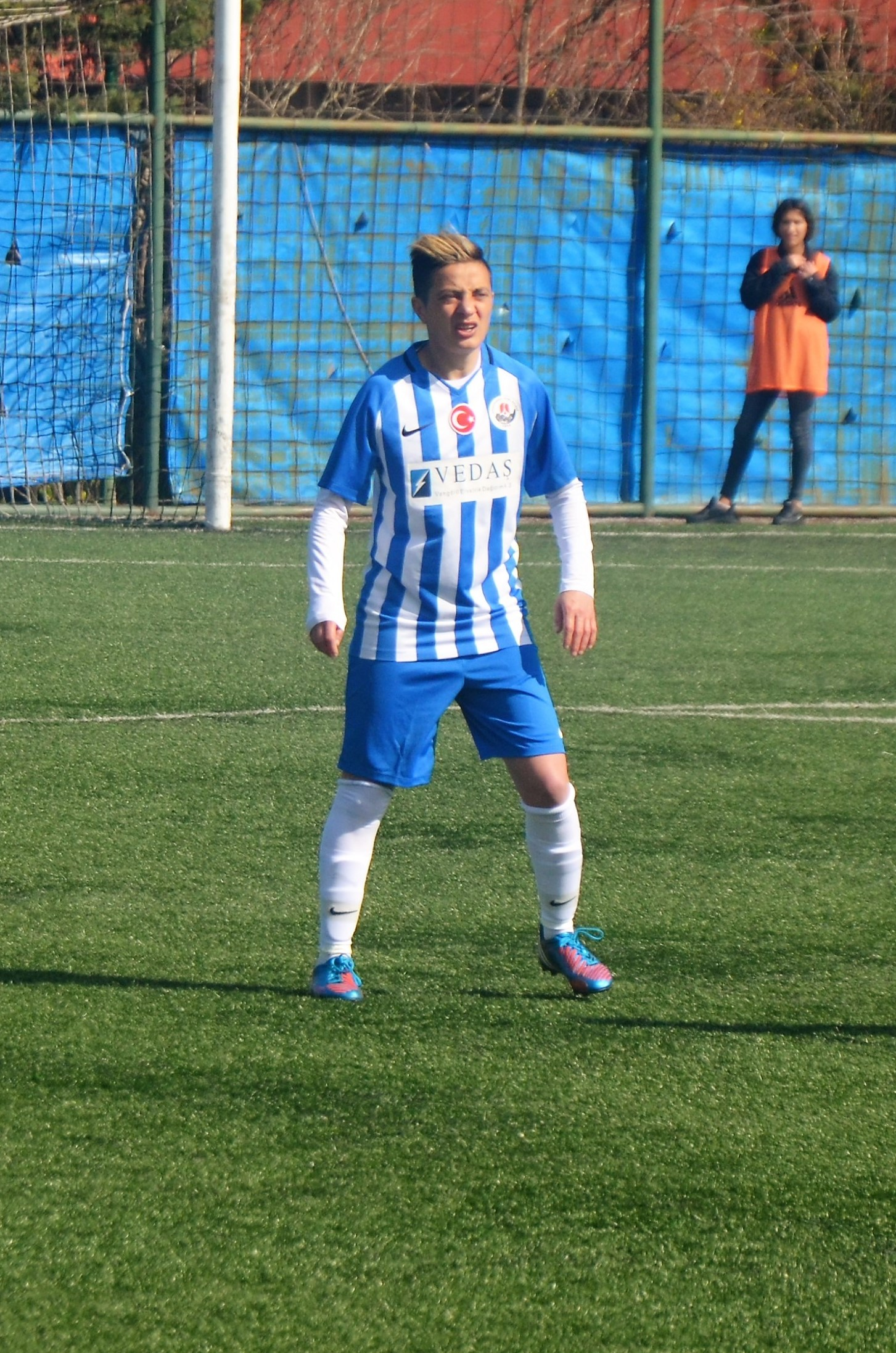
Armine Khachatryan

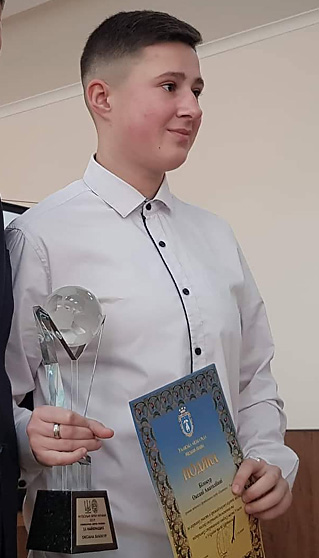
Oksana Bilokur

Ukraine

- (Ukraine) Tetyana Kozyrenko
- (Ukraine) Svitlana Frishko
- (Ukraine) Iryna Pidkuiko
- (Ukraine) Oksana Bilokur

Armenia

- (Armenia) Armine Khachatryan
