= 2023 Ukrainian Women's Cup =

Tournament details
- Country: Ukraine
- Dates: 26 August 2023 – 8 November 2023
- Teams: 16

Final positions
- Champions: Vorskla Poltava (4th title)
- Runners-up: Kryvbas Kryvyi Rih

The 2023 Ukrainian Women's Cup was the 30th season of Ukrainian knockout competitions among women teams. The tournament lasted a half of year from the end of August to November with 4 rounds including the final.

Sixteen teams of the Ukrainian Women's Football Championship are contesting the main trophy: 12 representing the Higher League (Vyshcha Liha) and 4 representing the First League (Persha Liha).

== Bracket ==
Fourth round
Zhytlobud-1 Kharkiv	1
Veres Rivne	0
Mynai	0
Kryvbas Kryvyi Rih	6
Seasters Odesa	0
Kolos Kovalivka	2
Shakhtar Donetsk	9
EMS-Podillya Vinnytsia	0
Mariupol	0
Ladomyr Volodymyr	5
Ateks Kyiv	0
Vorskla Poltava	30
Pantery Uman	0
Dynamo Kyiv	3
Polissya Zhytomyr	0
Dnipro-1	16

Quarterfinals
Zhytlobud-1 Kharkiv	1 (2)
Kryvbas Kryvyi Rih (p)	1 (4)
Shakhtar Donetsk	1
Kolos Kovalivka	2
Ladomyr Volodymyr	1
Vorskla Poltava	3
Dynamo Kyiv	0
Dnipro-1	2

Semifinals
Kryvbas Kryvyi Rih (a.e.t.)	2
Kolos Kovalivka	1
Vorskla Poltava	5
Dnipro-1	1

Final
Vorskla Poltava	2
Kryvbas Kryvyi Rih	0

== Competition schedule ==
=== Round of 16 ===
The draw for this round was held on 27 July 2023.

25 August 2023	Mariupol (I)	0–5	(I) Ladomyr Volodymyr	Kyiv
13:00		Report	Yuliya Stets 7'; Viktoriya Hiryn 16', 29', 69', 75'	Stadium: Temp; Referee: Alyona Kvasha

26 August 2023	Shakhtar Donetsk (I)	9–0	(I) EMS-Podillia Vinnytsia	Shchaslyve, Kyiv Oblast
11:00	Mariya Vykalyuk 6', 35', 64'; Yelyzaveta Molodyuk 19', 30'; Viktoriya Holovach 27'; Yuliya Semenyuk 60'; Oleksandra Yanyeva 71'; Lidiya Zaborovets 81'	Report		Stadium: Arsenal-Arena; Referee: Kateryna Ruda

26 August 2023	Pantery Uman (I)	0–3	(I) Dynamo Kyiv	Uman, Cherkasy Oblast
11:00		Report	Kateryna Kuksa 36'; Nadiya Chaika 50'; Arina Kravets 54'	Stadium: Tsentralnyi Stadion; Referee: Kateryna Usova

26 August 2023	Seasters Odesa (II)	0–2	(I) Kolos Kovalivka	Odesa
10:00		Report	Svitlana Kohut (Yarush) 58'; Anastasiya Voronina 76'	Stadium: Chornomorets; Referee: Oksana Pankiv

27 August 2023	Polissia Zhytomyr (II)	0–16	(I) Dnipro-1	Zhytomyr
11:00		Report	Lyudmyla Kryuchkova 7'; Ilona Novoselska 12', 17', 70'; Tetiana Levytska 15'; Valentyna Tarakanova 20'; Lyudmyla Kunina 22', 51', 75'; Anastasiya Nemets 30', 49'; Nataliya Ailinkiy 57'; Lialia Balashko 59', 63', 77'; Yelyzaveta Haiday 79'	Stadium: Spartak Arena; Referee: Nataliya Mamchur

28 August 2023	Ateks Kyiv (II)	0–30	(I) Vorskla Poltava	Kyiv
12:00		Report	Nikol Kozlova 4', 14', 19', 21', 38'; Yana Kalinina 8', 10', 16', 19', 42'; Ania Davydenko 13'; Veronika Andrukhiv 25', 34', 37', 63', 64', 68', 76', 89'; Olha Osipyan 41', 43', 45', 60', 62', 75', 88'; Iryna Podolska 49'; Yana Kotyk 74', 85'; Kamila Kulmagambetova 77'	Stadium: KNUBA Arena; Referee: Anastasiya Suponina

28 August 2023	Zhytlobud-1 Kharkiv (I)	1–0	(I) Veres Rivne	Shchaslyve, Kyiv Oblast
12:00	Darya Apanashchenko (penalty missed) 10'; Darya Apanashchenko 19'	Report		Stadium: Arsenal-Arena; Referee: Lyudmyla Telbukh

24 September 2023	Mynai (II)	0–6	(I) Kryvbas Kryvyi Rih	Uzhhorod
13:00		Report	Violeta Tyan 16'; Polina Yanchuk 21', 48', 64'; Diana Byalyakova 45'; Olha Basanska 55'	Stadium: Avanhard; Referee: Nataliya Mamchur

=== Quarterfinals ===
The draw for this round was held on 31 August 2023.

12 September 2023	Ladomyr Volodymyr (I)	1 – 3	(I) Vorskla Poltava	Volodymyr, Volyn Oblast
12:00	Viktoriya Hiryn 55' (pen.)	[ Report]	Viktoriya Radionova 8'; Kateryna Korsun 70'; Nikol Kozlova 90+2'	Stadium: Olimp; Referee: Oksana Pankiv

13 September 2023	Shakhtar Donetsk (I)	1 – 2	(I) Kolos Kovalivka	Shchaslyve, Kyiv Oblast
11:00	Nataliya Chendei 54'	[ Report]	Anhelina Fedorenko 17'; Tetyana Kytayeva 58'	Stadium: Arenal Arena; Referee: Liudmyla Telbukh

13 September 2023	Dynamo Kyiv (I)	0 – 2	(I) Dnipro-1	Kyiv
16:00		[ Report]	Nataliya Ailinkiy 45'; Valentyna Tarakanova 42'	Stadium: Dynamo training Referee: Kateryna Ruda

21 October 2023	Zhytlobud-1 Kharkiv (I)	1 – 1 (a.e.t.) (2–4 p)	(I) Kryvbas Kryvyi Rih	Kyiv
13:00	Nataliya Kornatska 8'	[ Report]	Violeta Tyan 69'	Stadium: Bannikov Stadium; Referee: Nataliya Mamchur
	Penalties
	Natia Pantsulaia (penalty scored); Daryna Apanashchenko (penalty missed); Olha Voitenko (penalty scored); Veronica Cojuhari (penalty missed)		Ysis Sonkeng (penalty scored); Daiana Semkiv (penalty missed); Tegnu Koulibaly (penalty scored); Anna Ivanova (penalty scored); Mahira Ali (penalty scored)

=== Semifinals ===
11 November 2023	Kryvbas Kryvyi Rih (I)	2 – 1 (a.e.t.)	(I) Kolos Kovalivka	Kryvyi Rih, Dnipropetrovsk Oblast
14:00	Olha Basanska 15'; Violeta Tyan 97'	[ Report]	Iryna Maiborodina 28'	Stadium: Sparta; Referee: Liudmyla Telbukh

11 November 2023	Vorskla Poltava (I)	5 – 1	(I) Dnipro-1	Poltava
14:00	Yana Kotyk 40'; Veronika Andrukhiv 45'; Nikol Kozlova 4'; Roksolana Kravchuk 48', 84'	[ Report]	Tetyana Levytska 90' (pen.)	Stadium: Molodizhnyi; Referee: Veronika Vasylchenko (Tahamlyk)

=== Final ===
25 November 2023	Kryvbas Kryvyi Rih (I)	0 – 2	(I) Vorskla Poltava	Lviv
14:00	Coulibaly (yellow card) 38' (yellow-red card) 81'	Report	Andrukhiv 40', 47'	Stadium: Skif Stadium; Referee: Sofiya Prychyna

== See also ==
- 2023–24 Ukrainian Women's League
- 2023–24 Ukrainian Cup
