= Armine Khachatryan =

Armenian footballer

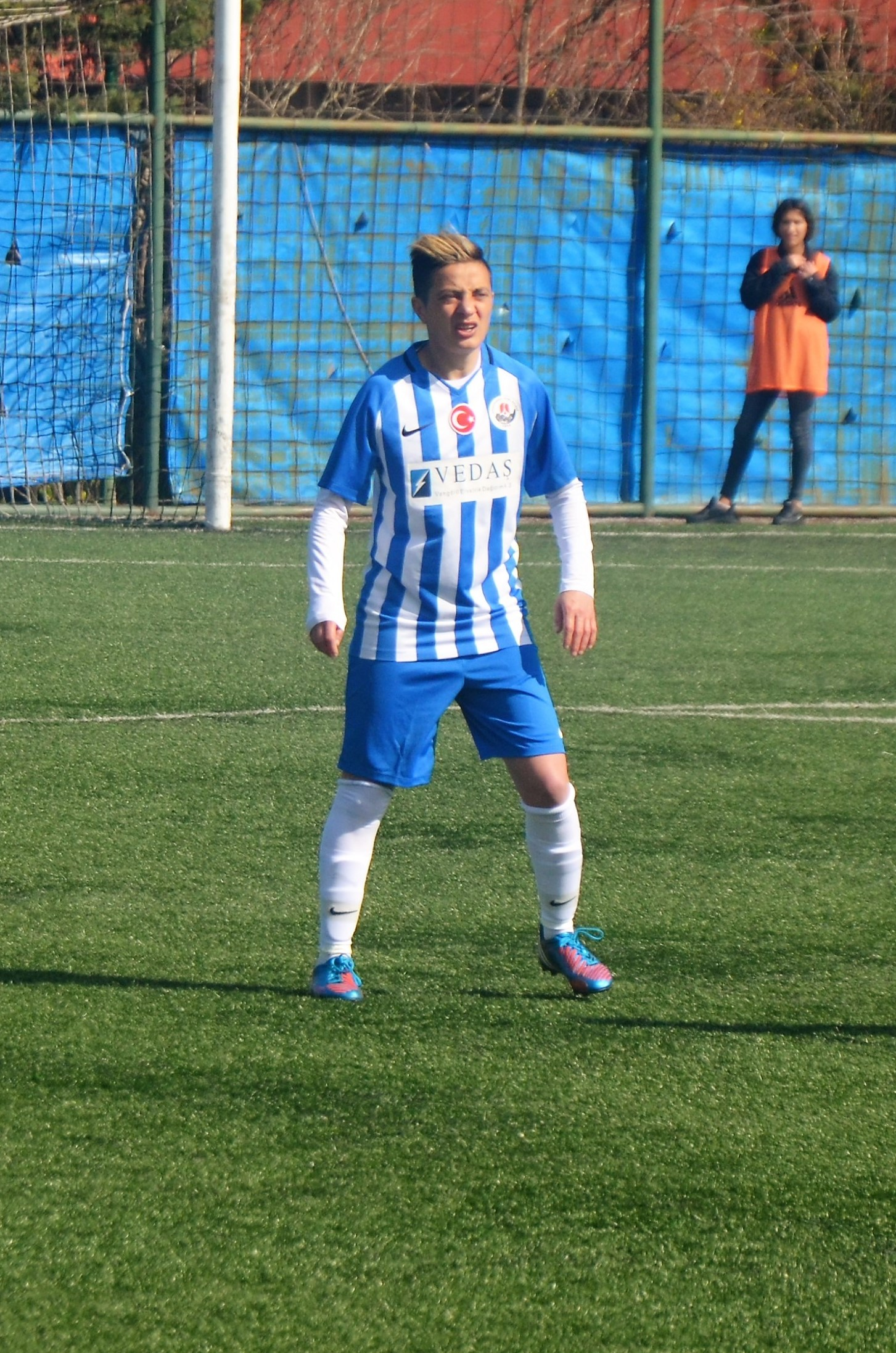
- Armine Khachatryan of Hakkarigücü Spor (March 2019)

Personal information
- Date of birth: 16 September 1986 (age 40)
- Place of birth: Soviet Union (now Armenia)
- Position: Defender

Senior career*
Years	Team	Apps	(Gls)
2012	Naftokhimik	12	(0)
2013	Zhytlobud-2	12	(1)
2015	Yatran Berestivets	14	(3)
2016	Pantery Uman	7	(2)
2019	Okzhetpes	8	(0)
2019	Hakkarigücü Spor	8	(0)

International career
2009–2012	Armenia	18	(0)
- * Club domestic league appearances and goals

Armine Khachatryan (Armenian: Արմինե Խաչատրյան; born 16 September 1986) is an Armenian professional women's football defender. She played in the Turkish Women's First League for Hakkarigücü Spor with jersey number 4. She capped 18 times for the Armenia women's national football team.

== Career ==
=== Club ===
She moved to Turkey and joined the newly promoted club Hakkarigücü Spor on 14 February 2019 to play in the second half of the 2018-19 Turkish Women's First Football League season.

She returned home end September 2019.

=== International ===
Between 2009 and 2010, she played for the Armenia women's national team in seven matches of the 2011 Women's World Cup Qualifying. In 2011 and 2012, she took part in all three UEFA Women's Euro 2013 qualifying Group 2, and in all eight UEFA Women's Euro 2013 qualifying – Group 7 matches for the national team.

== International goals ==
No.	Date	Venue	Opponent	Score	Result	Competition
1.	12 June 2021	Vazgen Sargsyan Republican Stadium, Yerevan, Armenia	Kazakhstan	2–0	2–1	Friendly

== See also ==
- List of Armenia women's international footballers
