= 2021–22 Ukrainian Women's Cup =

Tournament details
- Country: Ukraine
- Dates: 26 November 2021 – 2 December 2022
- Teams: 16

Final positions
- Champions: Vorskla Poltava
- Runners-up: Kolos Kovalivka

The 2021–22 Ukrainian Women's Cup was the 29th season of Ukrainian knockout competitions among women teams. The tournament lasted for over a year from November 2021 to December 2022 due to the full-scale Russian invasion of Ukraine.

== Bracket ==
Round of 16
EMS-Podillya Vinnytsia	1
Ladomyr Volodymyr	2
Karpaty Lviv	3
Pantery Uman	2
DIuSSh-26 Kyiv	0
Kolos Kovalivka	5
Veres Rivne
Zhytlobud-1 Kharkiv
Shakhtar Donetsk	+
Voskhod Stara Mayachka	-
Zhytlobud-2 Kharkiv	+
Ateks Kyiv	-
Dynamo Kyiv	0
Kryvbas Kryvyi Rih	6
Dnipro-1	+
Mariupol	-

Quarterfinals
Ladomyr Volodymyr
Karpaty Lviv
Veres Rivne	0
Kolos Kovalivka	2
Shakhtar Donetsk	0
Vorskla Poltava	2
Dnipro-1	-
Kryvbas Kryvyi Rih	+

Semifinals
Ladomyr Volodymyr	0
Kolos Kovalivka (a.e.t.)	1
Vorskla Poltava (a.e.t.)	3
Kryvbas Kryvyi Rih	1

Final
Vorskla Poltava	2
Kolos Kovalivka	0

== Competition schedule ==
=== Round of 16 ===
11 November 2021	EMS-Podillia Vinnytsia (I)	1–2	(I) Ladomyr Volodymyr	Vinnytsia
13:00	Sofya Blyznyuk 1'; Veronika Nikityuk (yellow card) 48' (yellow-red card) 75'	Report	Maryna Shainyuk 18'; Viktoriya Radionova 76'	Stadium: Stadion PDIu; Referee: Oksana Pankiv

20 November 2021	DIuSSh-26 Kyiv (II)	0–5	(I) Kolos Kovalivka	Kyiv
13:00		Report	Lyudmyla Kryuchkova 32'; Anna Kaverzina 44' (pen.); Olesya Malinovska 69'; Liliana Serbuk 83', 88'	Stadium: Temp; Referee: Nataliya Mamchur

20 November 2021	Karpaty Lviv (I)	3–2	(I) Pantery Uman	Lviv
13:00	Yuliya Zubar 22'; Nadiya Chaika 63', 81'	Report	Mariya Barbul 27'; Alina Miniaylo (yellow card) 30' (yellow-red card) 32'; Lidiya Zaborovets 45'	Stadium: Sokil; Referee: Oksana Pankiv

20 November 2021	Zhytlobud-2 Kharkiv (I)	3–0 (TR)	(I) Ateks Kyiv

20 November 2021	Shakhtar Donetsk (II)	3–0 (TR)	(I) Voskhod Stara Mayachka

20 November 2021	Dnipro-1 (II)	3–0 (TR)	(I) Mariupol

21 November 2021	Dynamo Kyiv (II)	0–6	(I) Kryvbas Kryvyi Rih	Kyiv
13:00	Ariana Hutsalyuk 7' (o.g.)	Report	Anna Ivanova 27'; Violetta Tyan 28'; Gabriela Zidoi 44'; Inna Hlushchenko 51', 67'	Stadium: Dynamo Training Center; Attendance: 50; Referee: Sofiya Prychyna

Veres Rivne (II)	DNP	(I) Zhytlobud-1 Kharkiv

=== Quarterfinals ===
28 September 2022	Veres Rivne (I)	0–2	(I) Kolos Kovalivka	Kostopil, Rivne Oblast
14:00		Report	Natiya Pantsulaya 69'; Liliana Serbuk 70'	Stadium: Kolos; Referee: Sofiya Prychyna

9 October 2022	Dnipro-1 (I)	0–3 (TR)	(I) Kryvbas Kryvyi Rih

26 October 2022	Shakhtar Donetsk (I)	0–2	(I) Vorskla Poltava	Shchaslyve, Kyiv Oblast
12:00		Report	Yana Kalinina 16', 86'	Stadium: Arsenal-Arena; Referee: Nataliya Mamchur

Ladomyr Volodymyr (I)	DNP	(I) Karpaty Lviv

=== Semifinals ===
22 November 2022	Vorskla Poltava (I)	3–1 (a.e.t.)	(I) Kryvbas Kryvyi Rih	Poltava
12:00	Roksolana Kravchuk 61', 107'; Iryna Podolska 102' (pen.)	Report	87' Ysis Sonkeng	Stadium: Vorskla; Referee: Sofiya Prychyna

23 November 2022	Ladomyr Volodymyr (I)	0–1 (a.e.t.)	(I) Kolos Kovalivka	Volodymyr, Volyn Oblast
12:00		Report	(penalty missed) 61' Anastasiya Voronina; 99' Iryna Mayborodina	Stadium: Olimp; Referee: Kristina Kozoroh

=== Final ===
2 December 2022	Kolos Kovalivka (I)	0–2	(I) Vorskla Poltava	Hnidyn, Kyiv Oblast
11:00	Beata Ambruș (penalty missed) 58'	Report	2' Yana Kalinina; 18' Yana Kotyk	Stadium: Livyi Bereh; Referee: Nataliya Mamchur

== See also ==
- 2021–22 Ukrainian Women's League
- 2022–23 Ukrainian Women's League
- 2021–22 Ukrainian Cup
