= Oksana Bilokur =

Ukrainian footballer

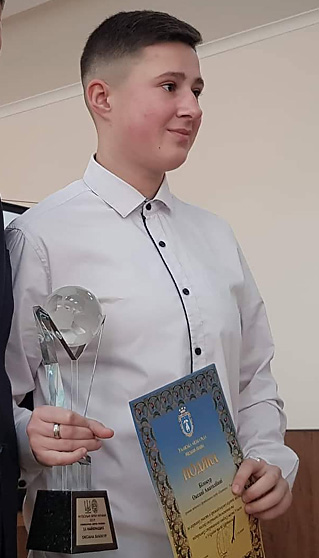

Personal information
- Full name: Oksana Anatoliivna Bilokur
- Date of birth: 8 March 2001 (age 25)
- Place of birth: Rodnykivka , Ukrainian
- Position: Forward

Team information
- Current team: Pantery Uman
- Number: 9

Youth career
- 2010—2014: Yatran Berestivets
- 2015—2016: Pantery Uman

Senior career*
Years	Team	Apps	(Gls)
2016–	Pantery Uman	106	(58)

International career^{‡}
2014–2015	Ukraine U14	3	(0)
2016–2017	Ukraine U17	6	(3)
2018–2019	Ukraine U19	15	(8)
- * Club domestic league appearances and goals as of 11 July 2025 ‡ National team caps and goals as of 2 December 2024

Oksana Anatoliivna Bilokur (Ukrainian: Оксана Анатоліївна Білокур; born 8 March 2001) is a Ukrainian footballer, who plays as a striker for Pantery Uman.

== Club career ==
=== Yatran Berestivets ===
At the end of 2010, Oksana joined the youth sports school of Yatran Berestivets in Rodnykivka.

=== Pantery Uman ===
In 2016, she joyned to Pantery Uman a football club in Uman. On 29 April 2016, she made her debut in the Ukrainian Women's Top League in the match against Ateks Kyiv.

In 2017, she was elected best young player of Ukraine U17. In the 2019–20 Ukrainian Women's Cup, Bilokur achieved a record: her team Pantery Uman, inflicted the most crushing defeat in the history of Ukrainian women's football on Luhansk-Spartak away with a score of 1:29, and she became the team's top scorer with 11 goals scored.

In 2019, Oksana Bilokur entered the symbolic team of the best 11 players of women's football "Football Stars of Ukraine".

== International career ==
She was called up by the Ukraine U17 and Ukraine U19

== Outside of professional football ==
In 2018, Oksana Bilokur received a scholarship from the Uman City Council. Since 2019 she has been studying at the Taras Shevchenko Humanitarian and Pedagogical College in Uman.

== Honours ==
Pantery Uman

- Ukrainian Women's First League: 2015
- Ukrainian women's beach soccer: 2017

Individual

- Best Young Ukrainian Playerː 2017
