= Koncha-Zaspa =

Neighborhood in Holosiivskyi District, Kyiv, Ukraine

Koncha-Zaspa Конча-Заспа
- Kyiv neighborhood
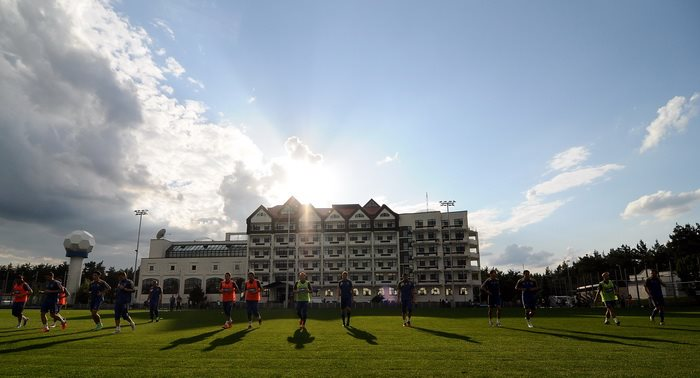
- Dynamo Kyiv training site in Koncha-Zaspa
- Interactive map of Koncha-Zaspa
- Coordinates: 50°18′02.1″N 30°34′37.5″E
- Country: Ukraine
- Region: Kyiv City
- Raion: Holosiiv Raion

Koncha-Zaspa (Ukrainian: Конча-Заспа) is a historic neighbourhood in the Holosiiv Raion (district) of the city of Kyiv, the capital of Ukraine. It is known for being the place where Ukraine's political elite live. Koncha-Zaspa is located in the southern part of the city. In the 1920s the territory was the first state preserve in the Ukrainian SSR.

== Description ==
The general area is located along the Dnieper river and consists mostly of woodland, while its northern part includes the former settlement of Chapayivka (before the 1920s Vita Litovska) which has been part of Kyiv since 1957. Among other former settlements are Kozyn and Plyuty.

In Koncha-Zaspa are located several sanatoriums "Koncha-Zaspa", "Zhovten", "Prolisok" as well as the training site of the FC Dynamo Kyiv with a stadium (just outside Chapayivka). Here is located a building of culture "Koncha-Zaspa" and a memorial complex Koncha-Zaspa.

Through the neighborhood runs the Stolychne shose (Capital highway, P01), along which are located numerous elite dachas designated for the local Communist nomenklatura. Before the establishment of the Soviet regime, the area was reserved for a couple of famous Kyiv monasteries (Vydubychi and Vveden) as well as the Tsar family. Following Ukraine's independence in 1991 the neighborhood continues to be the place where many of Ukraine's political elite have lived for decades, some received dachas for life, some for temporary use. Former Ukrainian presidents Leonid Kravchuk, Leonid Kuchma and Viktor Yushchenko all lived in state-owned dachas in Koncha-Zaspa. Former President Petro Poroshenko and former First Lady Maryna Poroshenko also lived there. Current Ukrainian president Volodymyr Zelenskyy lives in Koncha-Zaspa since July 2020. The Office of the President of Ukraine noted early July 2020 that this was "temporary." Zelenskyy and his family live in the state-owned dacha where his predecessor Yushchenko lived from 2004 until 2014.
