= Tsentralnyi Stadion (Uman) =

Uman, Ukraine sports stadium

- Kotovsky Stadium
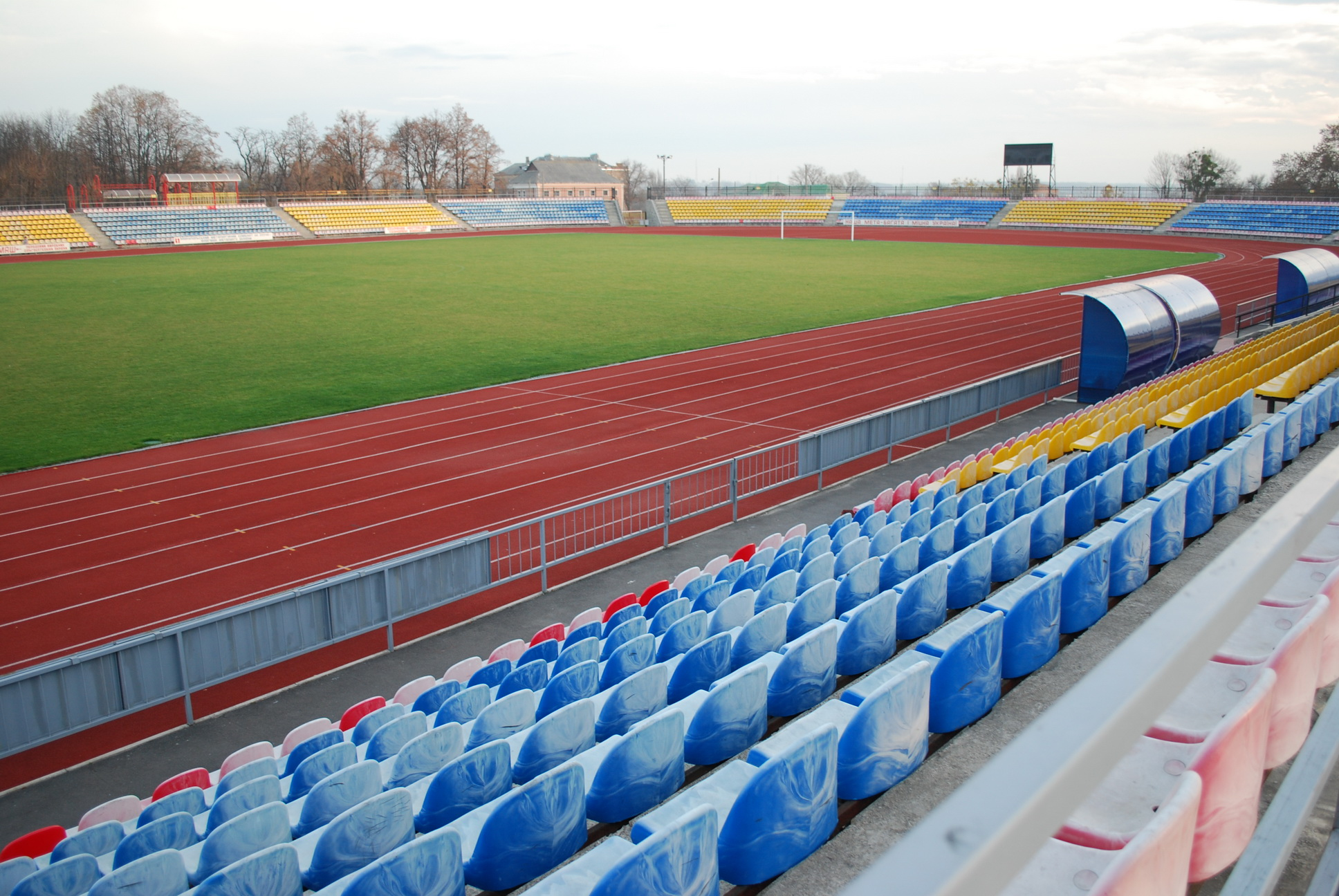
- View of the stadium.
- Interactive map of Tsentralnyi Stadion
- Former names: Grigory Kotovsky
- Location: 12 Kolomenska Street Uman, Cherkasy Oblast, Ukraine
- Coordinates: 48°44′55″N 30°12′55″E
- Owner: Uman City Council
- Operator: Pantery Uman
- Capacity: 7,552
- Surface: Artificial grass
- Field size: 110x70 m (grass); 104x67 m (artificial)

Construction
- Opened: 1922
- Renovated: 1960
- Expanded: 2005
- Architect: Inzhproekt-2

Tenants
- Pantery Uman since 2014; Skoruk Tomakivka since 2022-2023

The Tsentralnyi Stadion (Ukrainian: Центральний стадіон) is a sports stadium mainly used by the club Pantery Uman.

== Basic information ==
The stadium is located near the center of Uman. Nearby there is a memorial to the Decembrist revolt. The stadium's pitch is oriented north to south, with oval stands surrounding it. The plastic seats are three colors: blue, red, and yellow. Spectator seating is divided into 23 sectors, and there is a box for VIP guests. The Human Runners Club organize training events in the stadium quite regularly.

== History ==
=== Renovated ===
In 2004, the reconstruction work began with the help of Umanfermmash, supported and financed by the Mariupol Illich Steel and Iron Works. In 2005, work on the reconstruction of the new stadium began with full-sized synthetic turf football pitch was built.

The official inauguration of the renovated stadium took place on 9 May 2005, coinciding with the 60th anniversary of the victory in the German-Soviet War of 1941-1945. In August 2008, soft rubber running tracks of the European standard were installed. In September 2011, the inscription "Illichivets Stadium" was changed to "Umanfermmash Stadium" at the entrance of the stadium.

On 8 July 8 2016, the stadium hosted the final of the Ukrainian amateur football championship between Ahrobiznes Volochysk and Balkany Zorya.

On 5 June 2017, the stadium hosted the first-ever international match between the veteran Ukrainian and Israeli football teams. At the end of 2017, the stadium was returned from the Umanfermmash plant to the balance of the Uman City Council and in 2019 it was renamed Tsentralnyi Stadion.

=== New tenants ===
In 2022, the stadium has hosted the match of Ukrainian First League, Skoruk Tomakivka against Chernihiv.

== Usage ==
The stadium host the home matches of Pantery Uman the female teams in Uman. The stadium hosted also the Final of Ukrainian Amateur Football Championship, some matches of the Ukrainian First League and Ukrainian Second League.

== Important matches ==
=== Final of Ukrainian Amateur League ===
In 2016 was held the Final of Ukrainian Amateur League with the victory of Balkany Zorya for 1–0 in the season 2016.

Date	Time	Team #1	Result	Team #2	Competition	Season
8 July 2016	18:00	(Ukraine) Balkany Zorya	1–0	(Ukraine) Ahrobiznes Volochysk	Ukrainian Amateur League	2016

=== Ukrainian First League ===
Date	Time	Team #1	Result	Team #2	Competition	Season
15 October 2022	18:00	(Ukraine) Skoruk Tomakivka	0–2	(Ukraine) Chernihiv	Ukrainian First League	2022–2023

=== Ukrainian Women's Cup ===
Date	Time	Team #1	Result	Team #2	Competition	Season
23 September 2016	12:00	(Ukraine) Pantery Uman	0–4	(Ukraine) Zhytlobud-1 Kharkiv	Ukrainian Women's Cup	2016
17 November 2018	12:00	(Ukraine) Pantery Uman	1–2	(Ukraine) Dnipro-1	Ukrainian Women's Cup	2018–19
26 August 2023	11:00	(Ukraine) Pantery Uman	0–3	(Ukraine) Dynamo Kyiv	Ukrainian Women's Cup	2023
11 September 2024	14:00	(Ukraine) Pantery Uman	1–3	(Ukraine) Polissia Zhytomyr	Ukrainian Women's Cup	2025–26
13 September 2025	18:00	(Ukraine) Pantery Uman	1–1	(Ukraine) Ladomyr Volodymyr	Ukrainian Women's Cup	2024–25

== Previous names ==
- Kotovsky Stadium (1922–2005)
- Illichivets-Uman (2005–2011)
- Umanfermmash (2011–2019)
- Tsentralnyi Stadion (2019 until now)

== Gallery ==
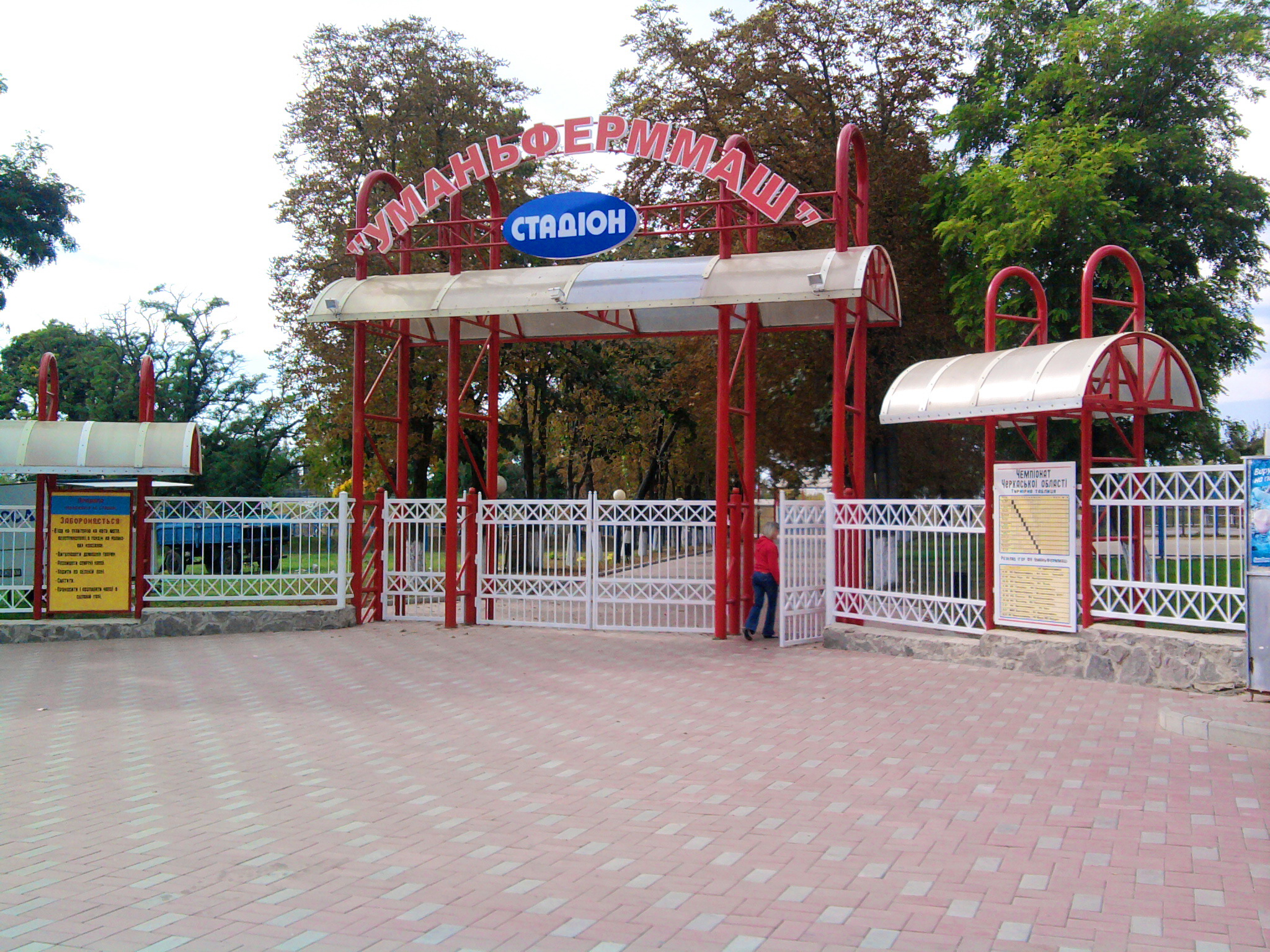
Main entrance to the stadium

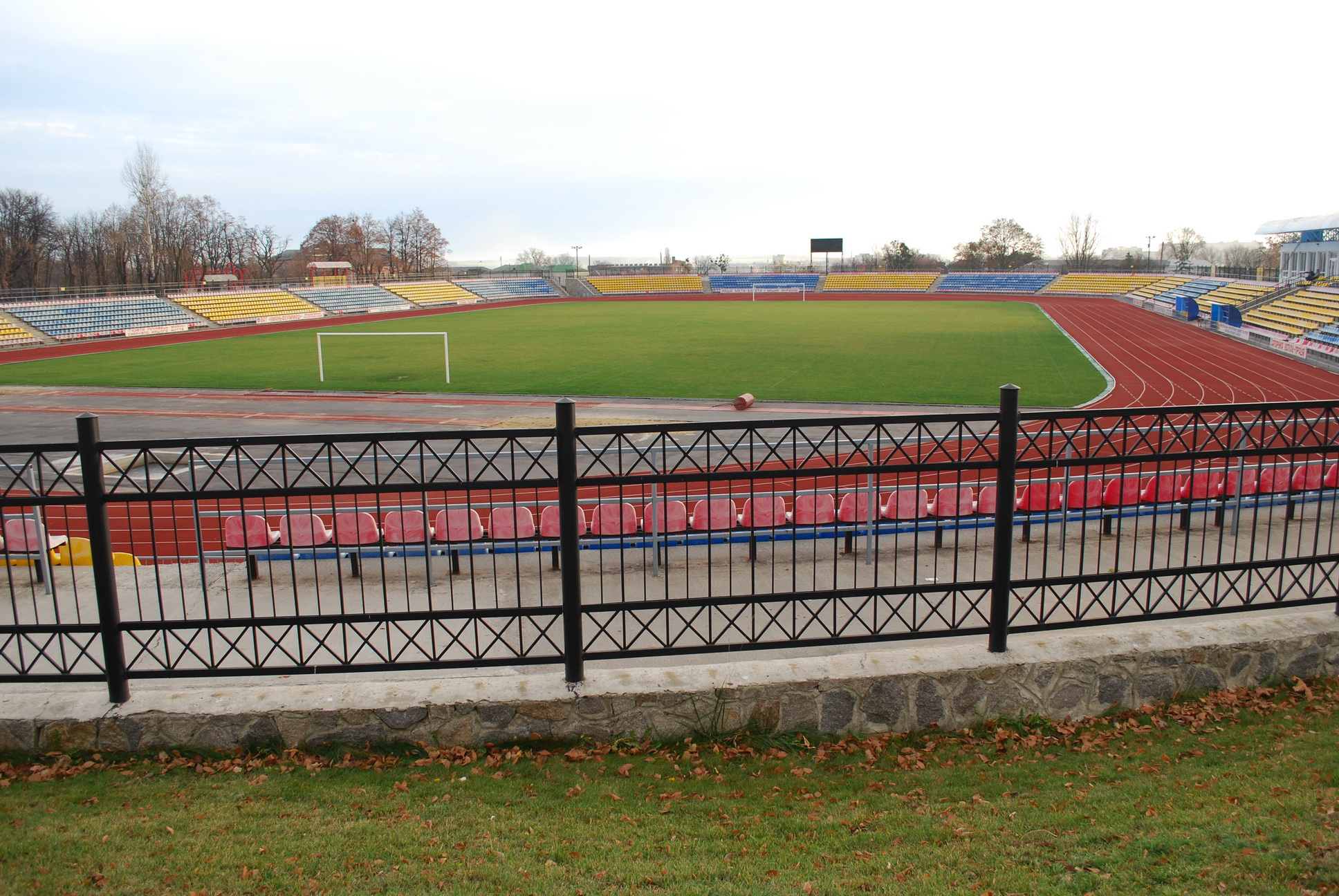
Main football field

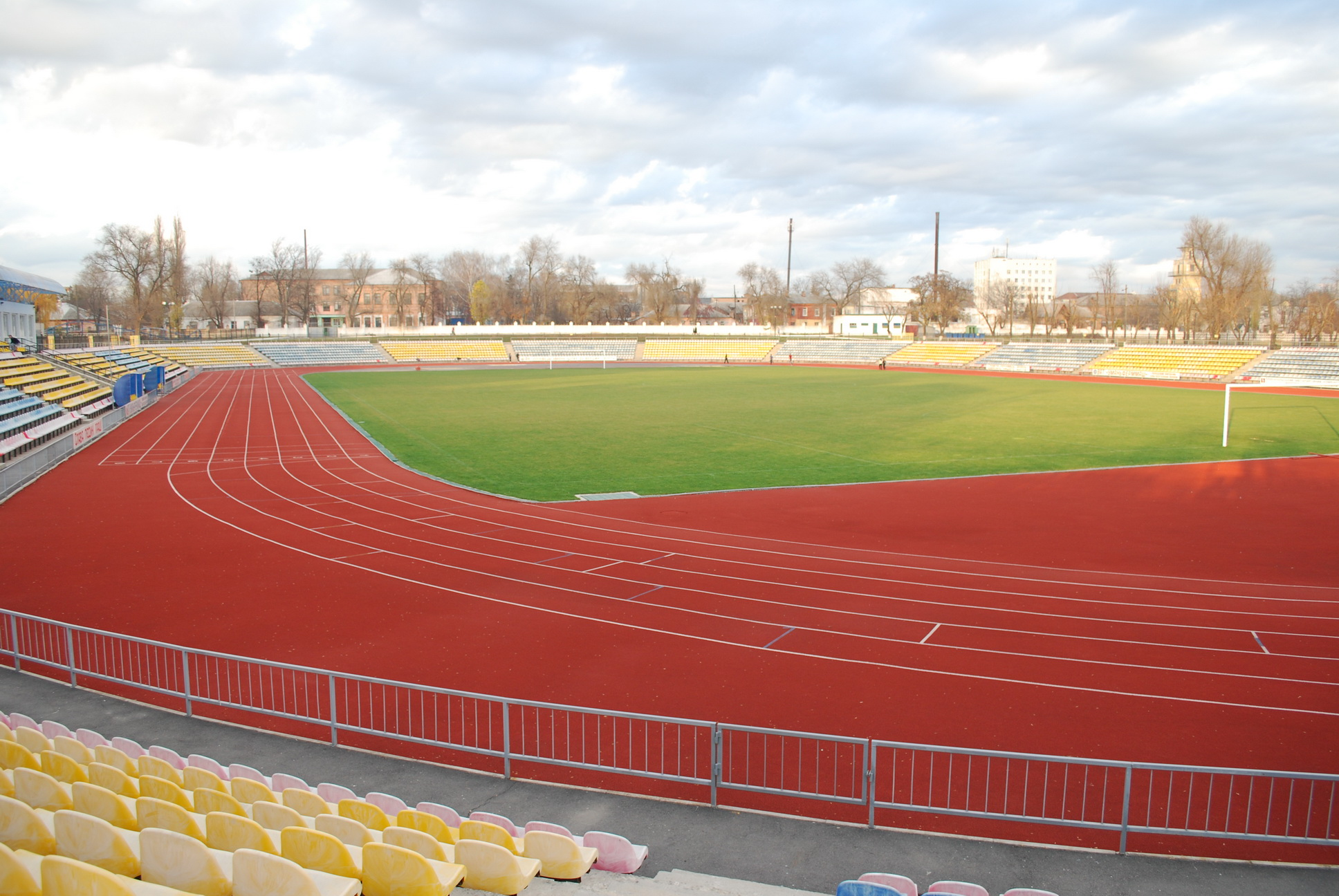
Main football field, view from the south side

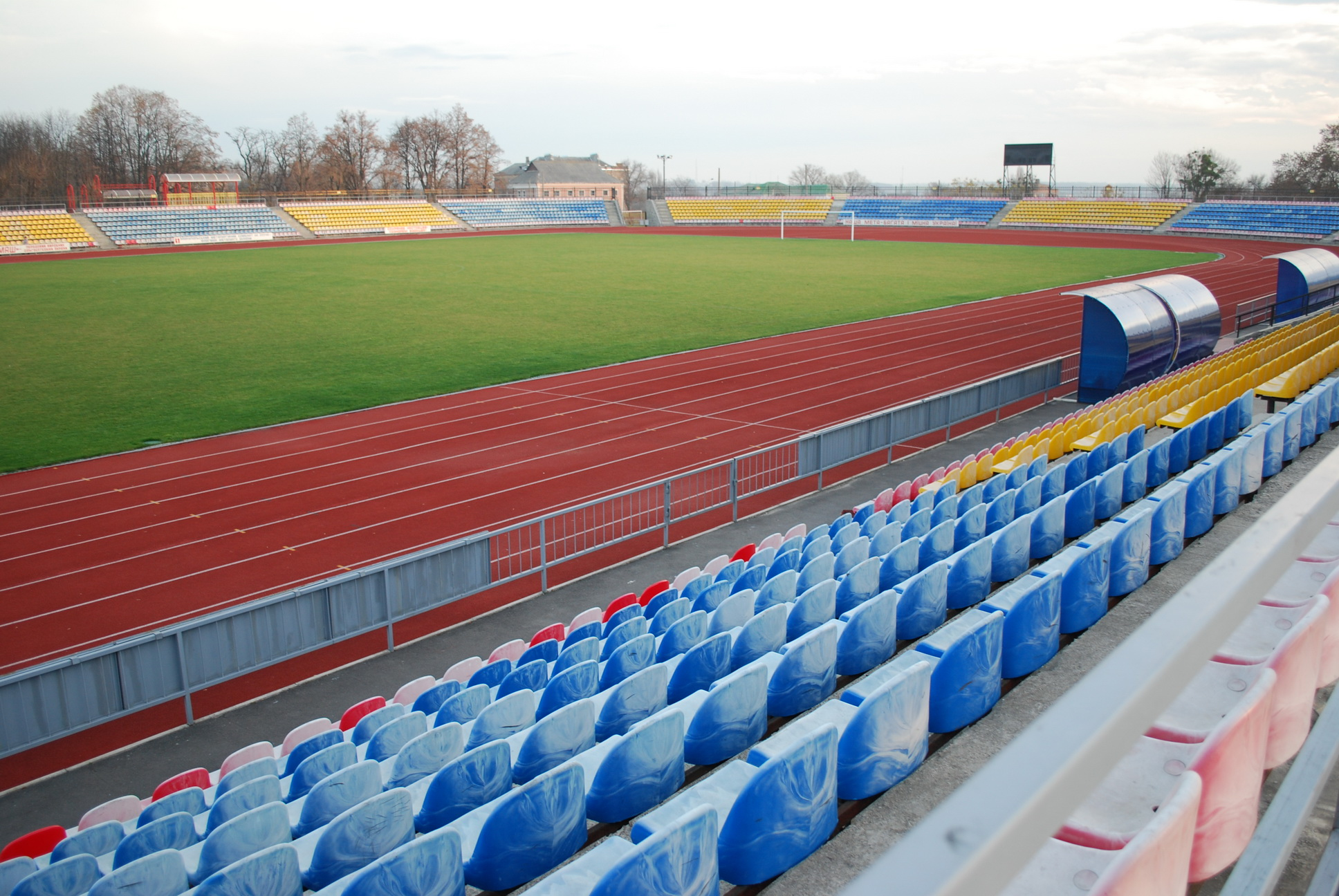
Stadium field from the west side

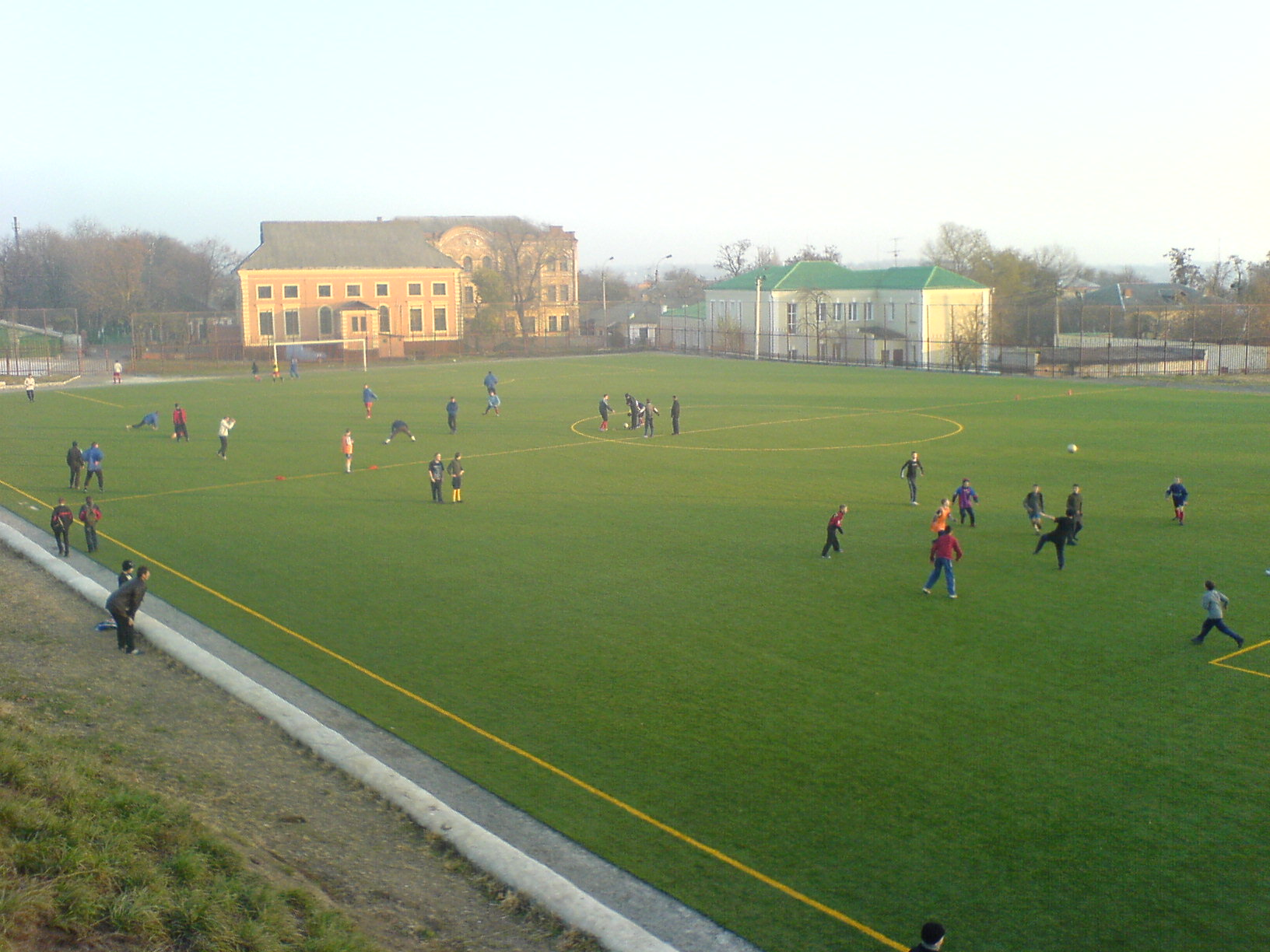
Artificial field from the north side

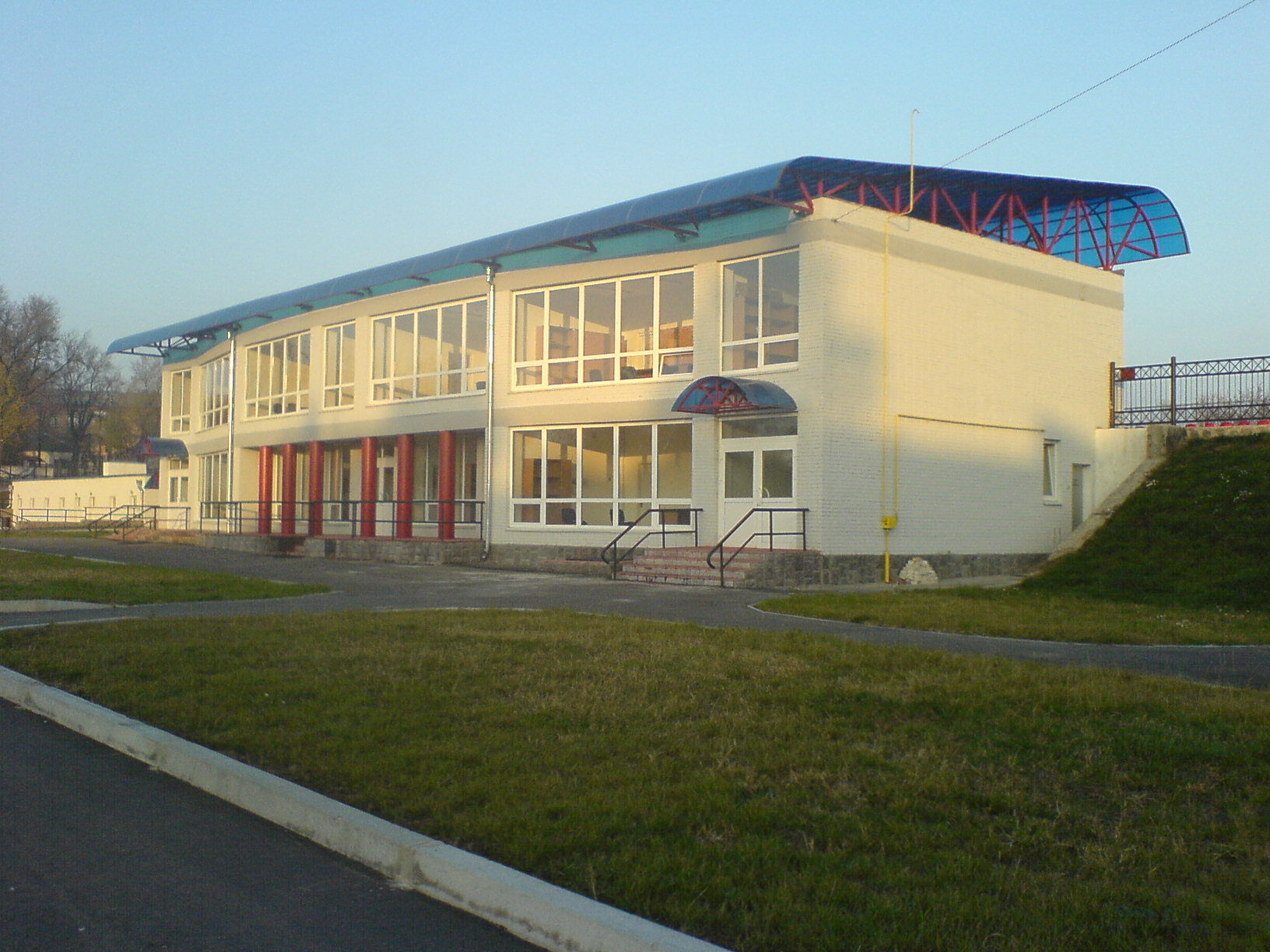
Administration building

== See also ==
- Central City Stadium
- Pantery Uman
- Skoruk Tomakivka
