= Dynamo Training Center =

Sports educational training facility in Kyiv, Ukraine

Dynamo Club Educational Training Center
- Koncha-Zaspa
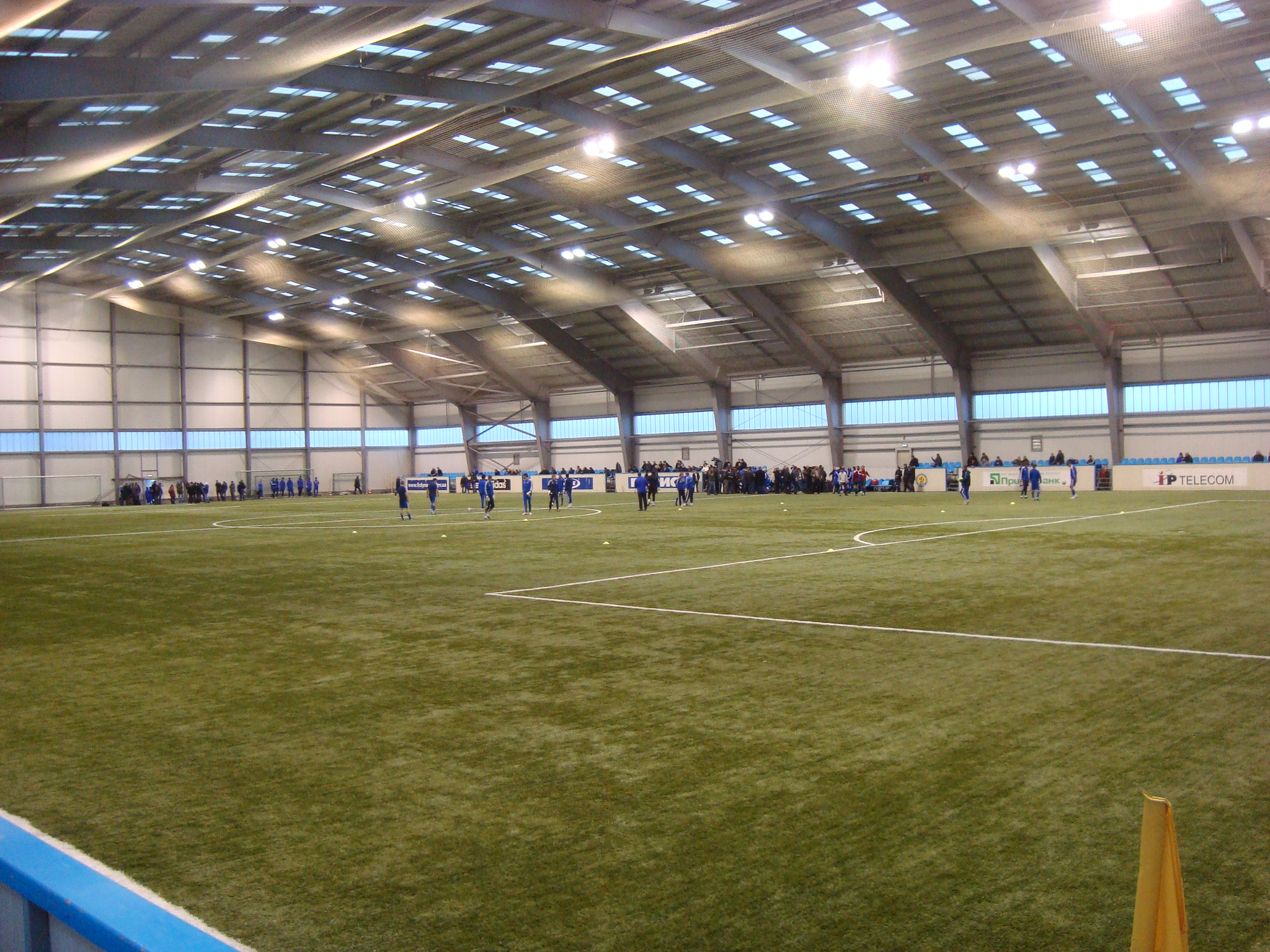
- Interactive map of Dynamo Club Educational Training Center
- Location: Kyiv, Ukraine
- Coordinates: 50°19′19.50″N 30°34′06.00″E
- Owner: Dynamo Kyiv
- Capacity: 1200
- Surface: Grass and Synthetic
- Field size: 105 m × 68 m (115 yd × 74 yd)

Construction
- Groundbreaking: 1961
- Renovated: 28 March 1998

Tenants
- Reserves: Dynamo-2 & Dynamo-3, Dynamo women, Dynamo football school, Kudrivka U19

Dynamo Club Stadium is part of the educational training facility ground operated by Ukrainian Premier League club Dynamo Kyiv located at the city limits of Kyiv in the former village of Vita-Lytovska (Koncha-Zaspa, Holosiiv Raion). The area is specifically notorious for having the state-owned mansions compound designed for the state high-ranking officials.

The facility includes four football grounds including one with artificial turf. There is also an administration area where there exists an enclosed training hall, medical facilities and a concert hall. One of the grounds has seating facilities where most official games are played at.

The original capacity of the ground was about 750, which has now been updated to hold 1200.

== History ==
The Educational-Training base of Dynamo Kyiv (NTB Koncha Zaspa) was opened in 1961 after the club won the Soviet Championship. In 1996, reconstruction began at the complex and it was reopened in March 1998. The project was managed by the well known architect Vitaliy Oksiukovsky. The facility is considered now one of the most modern in Europe and of the highest UEFA standards.

After Ukrainian Independence, Dynamo Kyiv became the owners of the facility.

The record attendance for a game is 1,100 when Dynamo Kyiv reserves hosted Arsenal Kyiv reserves on 14 June 2007.

== Usage ==
The facility is used primarily by Dynamo-2 Kyiv (Ukrainian First League) and Dynamo Kyiv reserves. Dynamo-3 Kyiv also used this facility until they were disbanded. The majority of the use is however is by the Dynamo Youth School and the junior clubs. Other clubs to have used this facility, especially the synthetic pitch in the early spring when other pitches are still frozen have been Arsenal Kyiv, CSCA Kyiv and their reserve team, FC Obolon Kyiv, FC Borysfen Boryspil and FC Nafkom Brovary.
