= Yatran Berestivets =

- Founded: 2008
- Ground: Stadion "Maximus", Berestivets, Uman Raion
- Capacity: 4,000
- League: Ukrainian Women's League

Yatran Berestivets is a Ukrainian women's football club from Uman Raion.

== History ==
Founded in 2008 as Yatran Uman and competed for several seasons until 2011. It withdrew from the league competitions. With revival of the Persha Liha (First League), the second tier, in 2013 the team resumed its participation as Yatran-Umanfermash. Originally set to have a single team for promotion, Yatran-Umanfermash lost the final game against Medyk Morshyn. Nonetheless, for the 2014 season Yatran was admitted to the Vyshcha Liha (Higher League).

In 2016 the club qualified for the Semifinals of Ukrainian Women's Cup. After defeating Mariupolchanka Mariupol, the club was eliminated in the semifinals by Lehenda Chernihiv at the Chernihiv Arena.

In August 2020 it was announced that the club withdrew.

== Notable players ==
Ukraine

- (Ukraine) Iryna Pidkuiko

Armenia

- (Armenia) Armine Khachatryan
