= Veronika Andrukhiv =

Ukrainian footballer

Personal information
- Date of birth: 5 May 1996 (age 30)
- Place of birth: Burshtyn, Ivano-Frankivsk Oblast, Ukraine
- Position: Forward

Team information
- Current team: Vorskla Poltava

Senior career*
Years	Team	Apps	(Gls)
	Vorskla Poltava	0	(53)

International career^{‡}
	Ukraine	18	(0)
- * Club domestic league appearances and goals as of 19:24, 30 August 2019 (UTC) ‡ National team caps and goals as of 19:24, 30 August 2019 (UTC)

Veronika Andrukhiv (born 5 May 1996) is a Ukrainian footballer who plays as a forward and has appeared for the Ukraine women's national team.

== Career ==
Andrukhiv has been capped for the Ukraine national team, appearing for the team during the 2019 FIFA Women's World Cup qualifying cycle.

== International goals ==
No.	Date	Venue	Opponent	Score	Result	Competition
1.	23 February 2024	Arena Arda, Kardzhali, Bulgaria	Bulgaria	2–0	4–0	2023–24 UEFA Women's Nations League play-off matches
2.	31 May 2024	Parc y Scarlets, Llanelli, Wales	Wales	1–0	1–1	UEFA Women's Euro 2025 qualifying
3.	9 October 2026	Futbal Tatran Arena, Prešov, Slovakia	Slovakia	2–1	3–1	2027 FIFA Women's World Cup qualification play-offs
4.	13 October 2026	Košická futbalová aréna, Košice, Slovakia	Slovakia	1–0	1–0	2027 FIFA Women's World Cup qualification play-offs
