= WFC Ateks Kyiv =

- Full name: Ateks Kyiv
- Founded: 2002
- Ground: Kyiv
- League: Ukrainian Women's League (First League)
- 2024–2025: 3rd, in First League (B group)

WFC Ateks Kyiv is a Ukrainian women's football club from Kyiv. The club plays in the First tier.

The history started in 2001 when the executive committee of the Sports Club "Civil parliament of Ukrainian women" under leadership of Alla Hres decided to create own female football team.

The club was formed in 2002 as CSK HPZhU (Central Sports Club of the Civil parliament of Ukrainian women) with a head coach Volodymyr Husar. Later that year he was replaced with Alla Hres. Next year in 2003 the team was renamed as Ateks (the star of success), while being part of the CSK HPZhU until 2014.

In 2004 Ateks was admitted to the Ukrainian Higher League (women). During 2005 to 2012 the team cooperated with the National University of Food Technologies and also participated in futsal competitions as NUKhT (the university abbreviation).

Due to financial difficulties, in 2008 the club did not participate in competitions.

Since 2012 the club cooperates with a Kyiv sports school #16 and is referred to as Ateks-SDYuShOR #16.

In 2014 the club was reformed as the Youth Football Club "Ateks".

In 2018 – 2021 the club competed at the second tier (Persha Liha).

For the 2022–23 season, the club signed cooperation agreement with FC Metalist 1925 Kharkiv as part of the Ukrainian Association of Football program on integration of both men and women competitions.

== See also ==
- National University of Food Technologies
- FC Metalist 1925 Kharkiv
