= 2026–27 Ukrainian Women's Prime League =

Prime League
- Season: 2026–27
- Dates: 17 July 2026 – May 2027
- Teams: 8
- Matches: 41
- Goals: 132 (3.22 per match)
- Top goalscorer: Nataliya Kornatska (10 goals)
- Biggest home win: Metalist 1925 7–0 Ladomyr (17 August 2026)
- Biggest away win: Pantery 0–7 Seasters (15 September 2026)
- Highest scoring: Metalist 1925 7–0 Ladomyr (17 August 2026); Polissya 6–1 Kryvbas (23 August 2026); Pantery 0–7 Seasters (15 September 2026); Ladomyr 1–6 Polissya (15 September 2026)
- All statistics correct as of 27 September 2026.

The 2026–27 Ukrainian Women's Prime League season is the inaugural season of the league. Because of the 2026–27 Ukrainian women's football reform, the league was created. Announced in summer of 2025 under a temporary "working title" as the Elite League, the official league presentation and final brand announcement took place on July 16, 2026, a day before the first seasonal match. The season started on July 17, 2026, and is expected to finish in May 2027.

On 14 August 2026, the UAF department of women's football presented its new ball designed for the Prime League. It was announced that it is the first ever personalized ball for the Prime League.

== Format ==
The newly formed league consisted of 8 of the best clubs of the 2025–26 Ukrainian Women's Higher League. It was determined that there would be four round-robins, with every club playing 28 matches in the season. The top clubs qualify for the European competitions. The last-placed club (8th place) will qualify for relegation to the Higher League if the Higher League club passes certification; at the same time, the 2nd-to-last club (9th place) will qualify for the promotion/relegation playoffs with the 2nd-placed team of the Higher League. After winning the promotion/relegation playoffs, the Higher League's runner-up may get promoted if it passes certification. If no clubs pass certification for the Elite League, there will be no promotions.

== Teams ==
=== Location ===
Due to the 2026–27 Ukrainian women's football reform, a new top league was created, to which qualified 8 clubs of the 2025–26 Ukrainian Women's Higher League.

Locations of teams in the 2026–27 Ukrainian Championship Prime League

=== Name changes ===
During the summer break, FC Metalist 1925 Kharkiv changed their name to FC Kharkiv; however, the UAF department of women's and girls' football continues to use the previous name for the women's team.

=== Stadiums ===
Due to ongoing Russian aggression against Ukraine, many teams played their games in Kyiv or its exurbs. A critical role in providing playing turf for the league's participants were stadiums in Kyiv's eastern exurbs of Shchaslyve (Arsenal Arena) and Hnidyn (Livyi Bereh).

Team	Home city	Home ground	Capacity
Kolos	Kovalivka	imeni Melnyka, Obukhiv Kolos	2,060 5,000
Kryvbas	Kryvyi Rih	Sparta Kolos, Boryspil	500 5,600
Ladomyr	Volodymyr	Olimp	2,000
Pantery	Uman	Tsentralny Stadion	7,552
Polissya	Zhytomyr	Polissia training center, Hlybochytsia	266
Kharkiv	Kharkiv	Arsenal Arena, Shchaslyve	1,000
Shakhtar	Donetsk	Arsenal Arena, Shchaslyve	1,000
Seasters	Odesa	Chornomorets Lyustdorf	34,164 500

== Prime League managers ==
Club	Head coach	Replaced coach
Ladomyr Volodymyr	(Ukraine) Oleh Bortnik	
Kryvbas Kryvyi Rih	(Ukraine) Kostiantyn Frolov	
Polissya Zhytomyr	(Ukraine) Mykola Podrannyi	
Seasters	(Ukraine) Anatoliy Didenko	
Pantery Uman	(Ukraine) Yuriy Derenyuk	
Kolos Kovalivka	(Ukraine) Lyudmyla Pokotylo	
Shakhtar Donetsk	(Ukraine) Roman Zayev	
Kharkiv	(Ukraine) Nataliya Zinchenko	

Team	Outgoing manager	Manner of departure	Date of vacancy	Table	Incoming manager	Date of appointment	Table

== Prime League ==
Pos	Team	Pld	W	D	L	GF	GA	GD	Pts	Qualification or relegation
1	Metalist 1925 Kharkiv	12	11	1	0	37	4	+33	34	Qualification for the Champions League second qualifying round
2	Kolos Kovalivka	14	9	2	3	37	7	+30	29	Qualification for the Champions League second qualifying round
3	Seasters Odesa	13	8	4	1	31	3	+28	28 (Note: Head-to-head points: Seasters 4, Polissya 1.)	
4	Polissya Zhytomyr	13	9	1	3	32	13	+19	28	
5	Shakhtar Donetsk	13	4	1	8	11	25	−14	13	
6	Ladomyr Volodymyr	14	2	3	9	9	44	−35	9	
7	Kryvbas Kryvyi Rih	14	1	3	10	7	41	−34	6	Qualification to the promotion/relegation playoffs
8	Pantery Uman	13	0	3	10	5	32	−27	3	Relegation to the Vyshcha Liha

Updated to match(es) played on 1 November 2026. Source: womensfootball.com.ua
Rules for classification: 1) Points; 2) Head-to-head points; 3) Head-to-head goal difference; 4) Goal difference; 5) Goals scored; 6) Fair play; 7) Draw lots.

=== Prime League results ===
Home \ Away	KOL	KRY	LAD	KHR	PAN	PZH	SHA	STR	KOL	KRY	LAD	KHR	PAN	PZH	SHA	STR
Kolos Kovalivka		6–0	6–0	0–1	3–0	5–0	3–0	1–1								
Kryvbas Kryvyi Rih	0–3		2–1	1–4 (Note: The Round 2 game was played at Stadion Kolos in Boryspil)	1–1	0–3	0–1	0–1								
Ladomyr Volodymyr	0–2	1–1		0–4	1–1	1–6	2–2	0–4								11/7
Metalist 1925 Kharkiv	3–1	5–1 (Note: The Round 9 game Metalist 1925 vs Kryvbas was played at Stadion Sparta in Kryvyi Rih.)	7–0 (Note: The Round 5 game was played at Stadion Kolos in Boryspil)		2–0	11/10 (Note: The Round 11 game Metalist 1925 vs Polissya, scheduled to be played on 25 September 2026, was postponed to a later date.)	4–0	0–0	11/7							
Pantery Uman	0–4	0–0	0–1	ppd (Note: The Round 6 game Pantery vs Metalist 1925 scheduled for 23 August 2026 was postponed.)		0–2	1–2	0–7				11/7				
Polissya Zhytomyr	1–0	6–1	5–0	0–3	3–2		4–0	0–0							11/5	
Shakhtar Donetsk	0–2	2–0	1–2	1–3	2–0	0–2		ppd (Note: The Round 6 game Shakhtar vs Seasters scheduled for 23 August 2026 was postponed.)								
Seasters Odesa	1–1 (Note: The Round 4 game was played at Stadion "Lyustdorf".)	7–0	3–0 (Note: The Round 8 game Seasters vs Ladomyr, scheduled for September 11, was canceled because Ladomyr refused to travel to Odesa. On 24 September 2026 the UAF CDC adopted a decision to award a technical victory to Seasters with a score 3:0, and a technical loss to Ladomyr with a score 0:3. Ladomyr was fined for 40,000 hryvnia.)	0–1	4–0	1–0	2–0									

Updated to match(es) played on 1 November 2026. Source: womensfootball.com.ua
Legend: Blue = home team win; Yellow = draw; Red = away team win.
Notes:

Additional notes:

=== Teams' form ===
Team ╲ Round	1	2	3	4	5	6	7	8	9	10	11	12	13	14	15	16	17	18	19	20	21	22	23	24	25	26	27	28
Kolos Kovalivka	L	W	W	D	W	W	W	L	W	W	D	L	W	W														
Kryvbas Kryvyi Rih	D	L	L	L	L	L	W	D	L	L	L	L	L	D														
Ladomyr Volodymyr	L	L	D	D	L	L	L	L	W	L	W	L	L	D														
Metalist 1925 Kharkiv	W	W	D	W	W	W	W	W	W	W	W	W																
Pantery Uman	D	L	L	D	L	L	D	L	L	L	L	L	L															
Polissya Zhytomyr	W	W	W	L	L	W	L	W	W	W	W	W	D															
Shakhtar Donetsk	L	L	D	W	W	L	L	L	L	W	W	L	L															
Seasters Odesa	W	W	D	D	W	W	W	L	W	D	W	W	D															

Updated to match(es) played on 1 November 2026. Source: womensfootball.com.ua
W = Win; D = Draw; L = Loss

=== Prime League fair play record ===
As of 1 November 2026

Fair play record
Rank	Club name	Yellow cards	Red cards	Points
1	Ladomyr Volodymyr	7	0	7
2	Metalist 1925 Kharkiv	10	0	10
3	Kryvbas Kryvyi Rih	12	0	12
4	Seasters Odesa	15	1	18
5	Pantery Uman	19	0	19
5	Polissya Zhytomyr	13	2	19
7	Shakhtar Donetsk	17	1	20
8	Kolos Kovalivka	19	1	22

According to regulations, a point is awarded for each yellow card and three points for each red card. The club with the smallest number of points receives an award.

== Prime League statistics ==
=== Top goalscorers ===
As of 1 November 2026

Rank	Scorer	Team	Goals (Pen.)
1	Nataliya Kornatska	Polissya Zhytomyr	10 (1)
2	Viktoriya Ostapiv	Kolos Kovalivka	9 (0)
3	Yana Kalinina	Seasters Odesa	8 (1)
4	Valentyna Tarakanova	Polissya Zhytomyr	6 (0)
4	Violeta Tyan	Kolos Kovalivka	6 (1)
6	Darya Apanashchenko	Metalist 1925 Kharkiv	5 (0)
6	Anhelina Fedorenko	Kolos Kovalivka	5 (0)
6	Viktoriya Seremchuk	Polissya Zhytomyr	5 (0)
6	(Venezuela) Jesusmar Colmenárez	Seasters Odesa	5 (1)

Notes:

- Own goals: Dayana Semkiv (Kolos Kovalivka for Metalist 1925), Anastasiya Vakulenko (Kryvbas Kryvyi Rih for Kolos), Ariana Cherednychenko (Ladomyr Volodymyr for Metalist 1925), Iryna Rybalkina (Pantery Uman for Seasters), Vlada Kabanova (Pantery Uman for Shakhtar), Krystyna Roshka (Pantery Uman for Metalist 1925)

=== Clean sheets ===
As of 1 November 2026

Rank	Player	Club	Clean sheets
1	Mariya Denyshchych	Polissya Zhytomyr	8
2	Daryna Bondarchuk	Metalist 1925 Kharkiv	7
2	Kateryna Samson	Seasters Odesa	7
4	Marina Dudnik	Kolos Kovalivka	5
5	Darya Kelyushyk	Kolos Kovalivka	4

=== Hat-tricks ===
As of 31 October 2026

Player	For	Against	Result	Date
Darya Apanashchenko	Metalist 1925 Kharkiv	Kryvbas Kryvyi Rih	4–1 (A)	24 July 2026
Viktoriya Ostapiv	Kolos Kovalivka	Pantery Uman	4–0 (A)	31 October 2026

== Promotion/relegation play-offs ==
The 2nd-to-last club (9th place) will qualify for the promotion/relegation playoffs with the 2nd-placed team of the Higher League.

== See also ==
- 2026–27 Ukrainian Women's Cup
- 2026–27 Ukrainian Women's Higher League
- 2026–27 Ukrainian Women's First League
- 2026–27 Ukrainian Premier League
