= 2025–26 Ukrainian Women's Higher League =

Vyshcha Liha
- Season: 2025–26
- Dates: 3 August 2025 – 16 March 2026 (first stage); 20 March – 22 May 2026 (second stage)
- Teams: 10
- Champions: Metalist 1925 Kharkiv
- Promoted: 8 teams to Prime League
- Relegated: none
- UEFA Champions League: Metalist 1925 Kharkiv, Seasters Odesa
- UEFA Europa Cup: Kolos Kovalivka
- Top goalscorer: Daryna Apanashchenko – 21

The 2025–26 Ukrainian Women's League season is the 35th season of Ukraine's top women's football league. It is part of the Ukrainian Women's Championship, which also includes lower 2025–26 Ukrainian Women's First League. It commenced on August 3, 2025, with 5 games in Round 1 and was expected to finish on May 22, 2026.

== Format ==
The format of this season's competitions has changed slightly from the previous season.

The Higher (Vyshcha) League kept the format consisting of two stages. The number of participants was reduced to 10. At the first stage, all 10 teams play a double-round-robin tournament in the first half of the season before the winter break. The top 5 teams qualify for the Championship group, and the bottom 5 teams for the Relegation group. The newly formed groups conduct another double round-robin tournament each.

The top 3 teams of the Championship group qualify for the European club competitions. Also, the top 3 of the Relegation group, along with all 5 clubs of the Championship group, will form the new Elite League for the 2026–27 season. The 2 worst teams, along with the 6 best teams from the First (Persha) League, will form the new Higher (Vyshcha) League for the 2026–27 season.

== Teams ==
Locations of teams in the 2025–26 Ukrainian Championship Higher League

=== Team changes ===
Promoted	Relegated
None	Obolon Kyiv (withdrew)

== Vyshcha Liha stadiums ==
Due to ongoing Russian aggression against Ukraine, many teams played their games in Kyiv or its suburbs. Critical role in providing a playing turf for the league's participant played Arsenal Arena and Livyi Bereh in the Kyiv's eastern suburbs Shchaslyve and Hnidyn.

Team	Home city	Home ground	Capacity
Kolos	Kovalivka	Kolos	5,000
Kryvbas	Kryvyi Rih	Sparta	
Ladomyr	Volodymyr	Olimp	2,000
Pantery	Uman	Tsentralny Stadion	7,552
EMS Podillia	Vinnytsia	Nyva training field	—
Polissya Zhytomyr	Zhytomyr	Polissia training center	—
Metalist 1925	Kharkiv	Arsenal Arena, Shchaslyve	1,000
Shakhtar	Donetsk	Arsenal Arena, Shchaslyve	1,000
Seasters	Odesa	Chornomorets	34,164
Vorskla	Poltava	Vorskla (first stage) Ltava (second stage)	24,795 640

== Vyshcha Liha managers ==
Club	Head coach	Replaced coach
Ladomyr Volodymyr	(Ukraine) Oleh Bortnik	
Kryvbas Kryvyi Rih	(Ukraine) Kostiantyn Frolov	
Vorskla Poltava	(Ukraine) Yevhen Kravchenko	(Ukraine) Iya Andrushchak
Polissya Zhytomyr	(Ukraine) Mykola Podrannyi	
EMS-Podillia Vinnytsia	(Ukraine) Oleksandr Dudnik	
Seasters	(Ukraine) Anatoliy Didenko	(Ukraine) Denys Kolchin
Pantery Uman	(Ukraine) Yuriy Derenyuk	
Kolos Kovalivka	(Ukraine) Lyudmyla Pokotylo	
Shakhtar Donetsk	(Ukraine) Roman Zayev	
Metalist 1925 Kharkiv	(Ukraine) Nataliya Zinchenko	

Team	Outgoing manager	Manner of departure	Date of vacancy	Table	Incoming manager	Date of appointment	Table
Vorskla Poltava	(Ukraine) Iya Andrushchak	Appointment to Ukraine national team	9 February 2026	2nd	(Ukraine) Yevhen Kravchenko	19 February 2026	
Seasters	(Ukraine) Denys Kolchin	Appointment to Chornomorets-2 Odesa	28 December 2025	3rd	(Ukraine) Anatoliy Didenko	9 January 2026	

== Vyshcha Liha First Stage ==
Pos	Team	Pld	W	D	L	GF	GA	GD	Pts	Qualification or relegation
1	Metalist 1925 Kharkiv	18	17	0	1	92	7	+85	51	Qualification for the Championship Group
2	Vorskla Poltava	18	15	1	2	61	19	+42	46	Qualification for the Championship Group
3	Seasters Odesa	18	12	2	4	42	19	+23	38	Qualification for the Championship Group
4	Kolos Kovalivka	18	10	1	7	46	20	+26	31	Qualification for the Championship Group
5	Shakhtar Donetsk	18	9	2	7	27	26	+1	29	Qualification for the Championship Group
6	Polissia Zhytomyr	18	7	3	8	32	49	−17	24	Qualification for the Relegation Group
7	Kryvbas Kryvyi Rih	18	4	4	10	20	46	−26	16	Qualification for the Relegation Group
8	Ladomyr Volodymyr	18	4	1	13	17	50	−33	13	Qualification for the Relegation Group
9	Pantery Uman	18	2	3	13	12	46	−34	9	Qualification for the Relegation Group
10	EMS Podillia Vinnytsia	18	0	3	15	10	77	−67	3	Qualification for the Relegation Group

Source: womensfootball.com.ua
Rules for classification: 1) Points; 2) Head-to-head points; 3) Head-to-head goal difference; 4) Head-to-head goals scored; 5) Goal difference; 6) Goals scored.

=== Results ===
Home \ Away	KOL	KRY	LAD	M25	PAN	POD	PZH	SHA	STR	VOR
Kolos Kovalivka		2–0	3–1	1–2	5–0	10–0	3–1	3–1	1–2	2–1 (Note: The round 13 match between Kolos and Vorskla took place on December 6, 2025, at the stadium "Molodizhnyi" in Poltava.)
Kryvbas Kryvyi Rih	1–1		1–4	0–3	2–1	6–0	1–4 (Note: The round 15 match Kryvbas vs Polissya, originally scheduled for December 14, was moved to an earlier date on October 20, 2025.)	1–1	2–2	0–4
Ladomyr Volodymyr	0–3	0–1 (Note: The round 16 match between Ladomyr and Kryvbas took place in Vinnytsia, Nyva training field.)		0–4	1–1	3–1	1–0	0–1	0–2 (Note: The round 18 match between Ladomyr and Seasters took place in Odesa, at stadium "Chornomorets".)	0–9 (Note: The round 1 match between Ladomyr and Vorskla took place on August 3, 2025, at stadium "Vorskla" in Poltava.)
Metalist 1925 Kharkiv	5–0	8–0	7–0		4–0	5–0 (Note: The round 12 match Metalist 1925 vs EMS-Podillya, originally scheduled for November 14, was moved to an earlier date on October 16, 2025.)	5–0	3–1	3–0	9–0
Pantery Uman	0–5	1–2	2–1	0–8		1–1	3–2	1–3	0–3	0–2
EMS Podillia Vinnytsia	0–5	2–2	1–2	0–9	1–1		1–2	1–2	1–3	0–6
Polissia Zhytomyr	1–0 (Note: The round 16 match Polissya vs Kolos took place at Spartak Arena, Zhytomyr on February 21, 2026.)	2–1	6–3	1–8	2–1	3–1 (Note: The round 14 match Polissya vs EMS-Podillya, originally scheduled for December 10, was moved to an earlier date on October 25, 2025.)		0–2	3–3	2–2
Shakhtar Donetsk	1–0	1–0	3–1	0–6	1–0	7–0	1–1		1–3	1–2
Seasters Odesa	2–1	3–0	4–0	2–3 (Note: The round 15 match between Seasters and Metalist 1925, that was scheduled on December 14, 2025, was postponed due to an extensive air raid alert in Odesa Oblast. The game was played on February 16, 2026, at the Chornomorets training base, SOK Lyustdorf.)	2–0	3–0	5–0	1–0		1–2
Vorskla Poltava	2–1 (Note: The round 4 match between Vorskla and Kolos took place on August 22, 2025, at stadium "Kolos" in Kovalivka, Kyiv Oblast.)	7–0	1–0	2–0	1–0 (Note: The round 17 match between Vorskla and Pantery took place on March 11, 2026, at stadium "Kremin Arena" in Kremenchuk, Poltava Oblast.)	7–0	8–2 (Note: The round 9 match Vorskla vs Polissya, originally scheduled for October 12, was postponed to January 1, 2026. However, it was played earlier on November 5, 2025.)	3–0	2–1	

Source: womensfootball.com.ua
Legend: Blue = home team win; Yellow = draw; Red = away team win.

=== Results by week ===
Team ╲ Round	1	2	3	4	5	6	7	8	9	10	11	12	13	14	15	16	17	18
Kolos Kovalivka	D	L	L	L	L	W	W	W	W	W	W	L	W	L	W	L	W	W
Kryvbas Kryvyi Rih	D	L	L	L	W	L	L	D	D	L	W	L	D	L	L	W	W	L
Ladomyr Volodymyr	L	L	D	L	L	W	W	L	L	L	L	L	L	W	W	L	L	L
Metalist 1925 Kharkiv	W	W	W	W	W	W	L	W	W	W	W	W	W	W	W	W	W	W
Pantery Uman	L	W	D	D	L	L	L	L	L	L	L	L	W	D	L	L	L	L
EMS Podillia Vinnytsia	L	L	L	D	L	L	L	D	L	L	L	L	L	D	L	L	L	L
Polissia Zhytomyr	L	L	L	W	W	W	L	D	W	W	L	L	W	D	L	W	L	D
Shakhtar Donetsk	W	W	W	L	W	L	W	L	D	W	W	L	D	L	L	W	L	W
Seasters Odesa	W	W	W	W	L	L	W	D	W	W	D	W	W	L	L	W	W	W
Vorskla Poltava	W	W	W	W	W	W	W	W	W	W	W	W	L	W	W	L	W	D

Source: womensfootball.com.ua
W = Win; D = Draw; L = Loss

== Vyshcha Liha Championship Group ==
Note: all participants have secured their berths for the new 2026–27 Ukrainian Women's Elite League.

Pos	Team	Pld	W	D	L	GF	GA	GD	Pts	Qualification or relegation
1	Metalist 1925 Kharkiv (Note: Participant of the 2025–26 Ukrainian Women's Cup final.) (C)	26	22	3	1	112	10	+102	69	Qualification for the Champions League second qualifying round
2	Seasters Odesa	26	16	5	5	63	22	+41	53	Qualification for the Champions League second qualifying round
3	Vorskla Poltava (Note: Vorskla Poltava withdrew and waived their opportunity to compete in the European club competitions. Since Vorskla became unable to compete in the European competition, their berth was passed on to Kolos Kovalivka.)	26	16	1	9	65	46	+19	49	Withdrew after the season
4	Kolos Kovalivka	26	12	4	10	54	29	+25	40	Qualification for Europa Cup first qualifying round
5	Shakhtar Donetsk	26	12	3	11	36	46	−10	39	

Source: womensfootball.com.ua
Rules for classification: 1) Points; 2) Head-to-head points; 3) Head-to-head goal difference; 4) Head-to-head goals scored; 5) Goal difference; 6) Goals scored.
(C) Champions

=== Results ===
Home \ Away	KOL	M25	SHA	STR	VOR
Kolos Kovalivka		0–3 (Note: The round 9 match of the second stage between Kolos and Metalist 1925 took place on May 18, 2026, at the Stadion imeni Melnyka in Obukhiv, Kyiv Oblast.)	2–1 (Note: The round 3 match of the second stage between Kolos and Shakhtar took place on March 29, 2026, at the Kolos training base in Sofiivska Borshchahivka, Kyiv Oblast.)	1–1	1–3
Metalist 1925 Kharkiv	0–0		2–2	1–0	3–0 (Note: Administrative result. The round 2 match of the second stage between Metalist 1925 and Vorskla did not take place on March 24, 2026, as it was scheduled. The reason was later disclosed by one of the footballers of Metalist 1925, Anna Petryk, who stated that Vorskla was not able to fill up a bus of the Poltava club. The UAF Control and Disciplinary Committee awarded a technical victory to Metalist 1925 (3:0) and a technical loss to Vorskla (0:3).)
Shakhtar Donetsk	1–0	0–7		0–3	3–0
Seasters Odesa	0–0	1–1	5–0		3–0
Vorskla Poltava	0–4 (Note: The round 10 match of the second stage between Vorskla and Kolos took place on May 21, 2026, at the Stadion Vorskla imeni Butovskoho in Poltava, Kyiv Oblast.)	0–3	1–2	0–8	

Source: womensfootball.com.ua
Legend: Blue = home team win; Yellow = draw; Red = away team win.

=== Results by week ===
Team ╲ Round	1	2	3	4	5	6	7	8
Kolos Kovalivka	D	W	D	L	D	L	L	W
Metalist 1925 Kharkiv	W	D	D	W	W	W	W	D
Shakhtar Donetsk	W	L	L	L	W	L	W	D
Seasters Odesa	D	W	D	W	D	W	L	W
Vorskla Poltava	L	L	L	W	L	L	L	L

Source: womensfootball.com.ua
W = Win; D = Draw; L = Loss

== Vyshcha Liha Relegation Group ==
Pos	Team	Pld	W	D	L	GF	GA	GD	Pts	
6	Polissia Zhytomyr	26	12	4	10	51	58	−7	40	Promotion to Elite League
7	Pantery Uman	26	8	4	14	26	52	−26	28	Promotion to Elite League
8	Kryvbas Kryvyi Rih	26	7	6	13	33	58	−25	27	Promotion to Elite League
9	Ladomyr Volodymyr (Note: Ladomyr Volodymyr gained promotion after withdrawal of Vorskla Poltava.)	26	7	2	17	30	62	−32	23	Promotion to Elite League
10	EMS-Podillia Vinnytsia	26	0	4	22	15	102	−87	4	Qualification to Higher League

Source: womensfootball.com.ua
Rules for classification: 1) Points; 2) Head-to-head points; 3) Head-to-head goal difference; 4) Head-to-head goals scored; 5) Goal difference; 6) Goals scored.

=== Results ===
Home \ Away	PZH	LAD	KRY	PAN	POD
Polissia Zhytomyr		2–1	1–1 (Note: The round 2 match of the second stage between Polissya and Kryvbas took place on March 25, 2026, at the stadium "Spartak Arena" in Zhytomyr.)	1–2	5–0
Ladomyr Volodymyr	1–3		5–0	0–1 (Note: The round 1 match of the second stage between Ladomyr and Pantery took place on March 22, 2026, at the Tsentralnyi stadion in Uman, Cherkasy Oblast.)	3–1
Kryvbas Kryvyi Rih	3–1	1–1		1–2	4–1
Pantery Uman	0–2	4–0	1–0		3–1
EMS-Podillia Vinnytsia	1–4	0–2	0–3	1–1	

Source: WFPL.COM.UA
Legend: Blue = home team win; Yellow = draw; Red = away team win.

=== Results by week ===
Team ╲ Round	1	2	3	4	5	6	7	8
Kryvbas Kryvyi Rih	W	D	D	L	W	W	L	L
Ladomyr Volodymyr	L	W	L	D	L	W	L	W
Pantery Uman	W	W	W	W	W	D	L	W
EMS Podillia Vinnytsia	L	L	L	L	L	L	D	L
Polissia Zhytomyr	D	W	L	W	L	W	W	W

Source: womensfootball.com.ua
W = Win; D = Draw; L = Loss

== Vyshcha Liha top goalscorers ==
As of 14 May 2026

Rank	Scorer	Team	Goals (Pen.)
1	Darya Apanashchenko	Metalist 1925 Kharkiv	21 (0)
2	Yana Kalinina	Vorskla → Seasters	18 (2)
3	Viktoriya Hiryn	Metalist 1925 Kharkiv	17 (0)
4	Nadiya Kunina	Metalist 1925 Kharkiv	15 (0)
4	Yelyzaveta Molodyuk	Metalist 1925 Kharkiv	15 (0)
6	Roksolana Kravchuk	Vorskla Poltava	13 (0)
7	Iryna Kotyash	Kolos → Vorskla	10 (0)
7	Diana Mushchenska	Polissya Zhytomyr	10 (0)
7	Viktoriya Radionova	Vorskla Poltava	10 (2)

== See also ==
- 2025–26 Ukrainian Women's Cup
- 2025–26 Ukrainian Women's First League
- 2025–26 Ukrainian Premier League
