= 2024–25 Ukrainian Women's First League =

Persha Liha
- Season: 2024–25
- Teams: 15 in 2 groups
- Champions: Pohoryna Kostopil
- Group winners: Mynai (Group A) and Yunist Chernihiv (Group B)
- Promoted: none
- Relegated: Panchokha Novyi Zavod (withdrew)

The 2024–25 Ukrainian Women's First League season is the 15th season of Ukraine's second-tier women's football league.

The competition is conducted in parallel with the 2024–25 Ukrainian Women's Higher League as part of the Ukrainian Women's Championship.

== Group stage ==
=== Group A ===
Pos	Team	Pld	W	D	L	GF	GA	GD	Pts	
1	FC Mynai (Q)	12	11	0	1	47	1	+46	33	Qualification to playoffs
2	Pohoryna Kostopil (Q)	12	8	3	1	16	5	+11	27	Qualification to playoffs
3	DIuSSh-1 Khmelnytskyi	12	6	2	4	12	12	0	20	
4	Nadbuzhia Busk	12	4	3	5	16	20	−4	15	
5	Ladomyr-2 Volodymyr	12	5	0	7	15	21	−6	15	
6	Prykarpattia-DIuSSh-3 Iv.Frankivsk	12	3	2	7	10	19	−9	11	
7	Rukh Lviv	12	0	0	12	5	43	−38	0	

Source: womensfootball.com.ua
Rules for classification: 1) Points; 2) Head-to-head points; 3) Head-to-head goal difference; 4) Goal difference in all matches; 4) Goals scored in all matches; 6) Fair play.
(Q) Qualified for the phase indicated

=== Group B ===
Pos	Team	Pld	W	D	L	GF	GA	GD	Pts	
1	Yunist Chernihiv (Q)	14	12	1	1	39	7	+32	37	Qualification to play-offs
2	Mariupol (Q)	14	11	0	3	51	16	+35	33	Qualification to play-offs
3	Ateks Kyiv	14	9	0	5	30	22	+8	27	
4	Lider Kobeliaky	14	6	1	7	41	31	+10	19	
5	Podil Kyiv	14	5	3	6	24	20	+4	18	
6	Polissia-2 Zhytomyr	14	5	0	9	20	31	−11	15	
7	Zhaivir Shpola	14	3	3	8	8	21	−13	12	
8	Panchokha Novyi Zavod	14	1	0	13	10	75	−65	3	

Source: womensfootball.com.ua
Rules for classification: 1) Points; 2) Head-to-head points; 3) Head-to-head goal difference; 4) Head-to-head goals scored; 5) Goal difference; 6) Goals scored.
(Q) Qualified for the phase indicated

=== Play-offs ===
==== Semifinals ====
15 May 2025	Mynai	3–2	Mariupol	Busk, Lviv Oblast
12:00	Ivasko 47', 90+2'; Lespukh 90'	Report	Palamarchuk 12', 17'	Stadium: Busk DYuSSh; Referee: Nataliya Mamchur

15 May 2025	Yunist Chernihiv	0–1	Pohoryna Kostopil	Busk, Lviv Oblast
15:00		Report	Shevchuk 18'	Stadium: Busk DYuSSh; Referee: Anastasiya Romanyuk

==== Third place ====
17 May 2025	Mariupol	2–0	Yunist Chernihiv	Busk, Lviv Oblast
11:00	Tarsukova 47'; Palamarchuk (yellow card) 26' (yellow-red card) 66'	Report	Horbach 61' (o.g.)	Stadium: Busk DYuSSh; Referee: Nataliya Mamchur

==== First place ====
17 May 2025	Mynai	1–2	Pohoryna Kostopil	Busk, Lviv Oblast
14:00	Lespukh 15'	Report	Nadyezhdina 20'; Taborovets 75'	Stadium: Busk DYuSSh; Referee: Kristina Kozoroh

== Number of teams by region ==
Number	Region	Team(s)
2	Kyiv	Ateks, Podil
2	Lviv Oblast	Nadbuzhia Busk, Rukh Lviv
2	Zhytomyr Oblast	Panchokha Novyi Zavod, Polissya-2 Zhytomyr
1	Cherkasy Oblast	Zhaivir Shpola
1	Chernihiv Oblast	Iunist Chernihiv
1	Donetsk Oblast	Mariupol
1	Ivano-Frankivsk Oblast	Prykarpattia-DIuSSh-3 Ivano-Frankivsk
1	Khmelnytskyi Oblast	DIuSSh-1 Khmelnytskyi
1	Poltava Oblast	Lider Kobeliaky
1	Rivne Oblast	Pohoryna Kostopil
1	Volyn Oblast	Ladomyr-2 Volodymyr
1	Zakarpattia Oblast	FC Mynai

== See also ==
- 2024–25 Ukrainian Women's Higher League
- 2024–25 Ukrainian Women's Cup
