= Ukrainian Women's First League =

- Founded: 1992
- Country: Ukraine
- Confederation: UEFA
- Divisions: 2 groups
- Number of clubs: 12
- Level on pyramid: 2 (1992–1993); 2 (2013–2026); 3 (2026–)
- Promotion to: Higher League
- Relegation to: none
- Domestic cup: Ukrainian Women's Cup
- Current champions: FC Mariupol (2nd title) (2025–26)
- Most championships: FC Mariupol (2 titles)
- Website: Official website
- Current: 2026–27 Ukrainian Women's First League

The Ukrainian Women's First League is an association football competition for women at the lower tier and part of the Ukrainian Women's Football Championship. The Championship, as the women's national football competition, consists of two tiers: the Higher League (Vyshcha Liha), the top tier and considered professional, and the First League (Persha Liha), the lower tier and considered amateur (non-professional). The competitions are organized by the Ukrainian Association of Football (UAF) department of women's and girls' football. The Championship has existed since 1992, following the dissolution of the Soviet Union and Ukraine regaining full independence.

As a tier, the First League was established in 1992, but was discontinued right after the 1993 season. It was revived back in 2013. Since then, it has been used as a "preliminary" competition before clubs are admitted to the Higher League. The champion, and sometimes the runner-up, is admitted to the Higher League. First League competitions are organized in two groups, with participants being split geographically.

== First League laureates ==
Season	Champion	Runner-up	3rd Position	Groups	Teams
1992	Iskra Zaporizhzhia (1)	Tekstylnyk Donetsk	Iunisa Luhansk	1	8
1993	Stymul-ZDU Zaporizhzhia (1)	Lvivianka Lviv	Lada Mykolaiv	1	6
1994–2012	the tier's competitions did not exist				
2013	Medyk Morshyn (1)	Iatran-Umanfermmash	Zhytlobud-2-KhOVUFK Kharkiv	2	10
2014	Nika Poltava (1)	Ternopolianka Ternopil	Osvita-DYuSSh 3 Ivano-Frankivsk	2	8
2015	Pantery Uman (1)	Osvita-DYuSSh 3 Ivano-Frankivsk	Torpedochka-Avtomobilist Mykolaiv	2	9
2016	Spartak Chernihiv (1)	Zlahoda-Dnipro-1	Lvivianka Lviv	3	14
2017	Ladomyr Volodymyr-Volynskyi (1)	Mariupolchanka Mariupol	Iantarochka Novoyavorivsk	3	11
2017–18	Voskhod Stara Maiachka (1)	Iantarochka Novoyavorivsk	Mariupolchanka Mariupol	3	11
2018–19	Mariupolchanka Mariupol (1)	EMS-Podillia Vinnytsia	SC Vyshneve	2	11
2019–20	abandoned due to the COVID-19 pandemic (group winners: Karpaty and Spartak-Orion)			2	10
2020–21	Kolos Kovalivka (1)	Ateks Kyiv	KhPKSP-Zhytlobud-2 Kharkiv	1	10
2021–22	abandoned due to the Russo-Ukrainian War (group winners: Dynamo and Shakhtar)			2	18
2022–23	Lider Kobeliaky (1)	Yunist Chernihiv	Iantarochka Novoyavorivsk	1	5
2023–24	Seasters Odesa (1)	Obolon Kyiv	FC Mynai	2	16
2024–25	Pohoryna Kostopil (1)	FC Mynai	FC Mariupol	2	15
2025–26	FC Mariupol (2)	FC Uzhhorod	DIuSSh Podil Kyiv	2	15
2026–27				2	12

=== All-time participants ===
The table lists the First League teams's place in each of the seasons. The table also tracks the First League teams that competed in the upper Higher League (<^>) when they were promoted or withdrew from the First League.

==== 1992–2024 ====
Season	1992	1993	1994	1995	...	2012	2013	2014	2015	2016	2017	2017/18	2018/19	2019/20	2020/21	2021/22	2022/23	2023/24
Teams	8	6	0	0	→	0	10	8	9	14	11	11	11	10	10	18	5	16
Iskra Zaporizhzhia	1	<^>	<^>	<^>	→	·	·	·	·	·	·	·	·	·	·	·	·	·
Tekstylnyk Donetsk	2	<^>	<^>	<^>	→	<^>	<^>	<^>	·	·	·	·	·	·	·	·	·	·
Iunisa Luhansk	3	<^>	<^>	·	→	·	·	·	·	·	·	·	·	·	·	·	·	·
Radosyn Kyiv	4	<^>	<^>	<^>	→	·	·	·	·	·	·	·	·	·	·	·	·	·
Mriya Kirovohrad	5	4	<^>	·	→	·	·	·	·	·	·	·	·	·	·	·	·	·
Lvivianka Lviv	6	2	·	·	→	·	·	·	·	A1A2	·	·	·	·	·	·	·	·
Tavria Kherson	7	5	<^>	·	→	·	·	·	·	·	·	·	·	·	·	·	·	·
Olimp-2 Kyiv	8	·	·	·	→	·	·	·	·	·	·	·	·	·	·	·	·	·
Stymul-ZDU Zaporizhzhia	·	1	·	·	→	·	·	·	·	·	·	·	·	·	·	·	·	·
Lada Mykolaiv	·	3	<^>	<^>	→	·	·	·	·	·	·	·	·	·	·	·	·	·
Kontek Luhansk	·	6	<^>	·	→	·	·	·	·	·	·	·	·	·	·	·	·	·
Ateks-Obolon Kyiv (Ateks-2)	·	·	·	·	→	·	A4	·	·	·	·	A4	·	·	·	·	·	·
Bahira Chervonyi Lyman	·	·	·	·	→	·	B4	·	·	·	·	·	·	·	·	·	·	·
Viktoria Liubar	·	·	·	·	→	·	A5	·	·	·	·	·	·	·	·	·	·	·
DYuSSh Voznesensk	·	·	·	·	→	·	B3	·	·	·	·	·	·	·	·	·	·	·
Luhanochka Luhansk (Zorya-Spartak)	·	·	·	·	→	·	B5	·	·	C1A3	C3	C3	B5	B5	10	·	·	·
Vorskla Poltava (Zhytlobud-2 KhOFUVK)	·	·	·	·	→	·	B1	·	B3	·	C2	·	·	B3	3	B4	·	·
Medyk Morshyn	·	·	·	·	→	·	A2	A4	·	·	·	·	·	·	·	·	·	·
Iednist Plysky (Spartak)	·	·	·	·	→	·	B2	·	A2	B2A1	<^>	<^>	<^>	<^>	·	·	·	·
Chornomorochka Odesa	·	·	·	·	→	·	A3	B3	B4	B4	·	·	·	·	·	·	·	·
Season	1992	1993	1994	1995	...	2012	2013	2014	2015	2016	2017	2017/18	2018/19	2019/20	2020/21	2021/22	2022/23	2023/24
Teams	8	6	0	0	→	0	10	8	9	14	11	11	11	10	10	18	5	16
Iatran Berestivets	·	·	·	·	→	·	A2	<^>	<^>	<^>	<^>	<^>	<^>	<^>	·	A6	·	·
DIuSSh-1 Khmelnytskyi (Derazhnia)	·	·	·	·	→	·	·	A3	A5	·	·	·	·	·	·	A8	·	A8
Nika Poltava	·	·	·	·	→	·	·	B1	·	·	·	·	·	·	·	·	·	·
DYuSSh-3 Ivano-Frankivsk	·	·	·	·	→	·	·	A2	A1	A2B2	A3	·	A3	A5	5	A4	5	A3
Ternopolianka Ternopil	·	·	·	·	→	·	·	A1	<^>	·	·	·	·	·	·	·	·	·
Nika Mykolaiv (Torpedochka)	·	·	·	·	→	·	·	B2	B2	B1B3	B3	B3	·	B1	<^>	B9	·	·
Pantery Uman (DYuSSh 1)	·	·	·	·	→	·	·	B4	B1	<^>	<^>	<^>	<^>	<^>	<^>	<^>	<^>	<^>
Iantarochka Novoyavorivsk	·	·	·	·	→	·	·	·	A3	A4	A2	A1	A4	A4	8	A5	3	A6
Kolos(-Mriya) Makhnivka	·	·	·	·	→	·	·	·	A4	A3	B2	A2	A6	A3	·	·	·	·
Dnipro-1 (Zlahoda)	·	·	·	·	→	·	·	·	·	C2B1	<^>	<^>	<^>	·	·	B2	<^>	<^>
Polissia Zhytomyr	·	·	·	·	→	·	·	·	·	A5	B4	A3	B4	·	·	·	·	4
SumDU-Barsa Sumy	·	·	·	·	→	·	·	·	·	B3	·	C2	·	·	·	·	·	·
Mariupolchanka Mariupol (Lehion)	·	·	·	·	→	·	·	·	·	C3	C1	C1	B1	<^>	<^>	<^>	<^>	<^>
KDYuSSh 8 Kharkiv	·	·	·	·	→	·	·	·	·	C4	·	·	·	·	·	·	·	·
Nika Pervomaisky Raion	·	·	·	·	→	·	·	·	·	C5	·	·	·	·	·	·	·	·
Ladomyr Volodymyr-Volynskyi	·	·	·	·	→	·	·	·	·	·	A1	<^>	<^>	<^>	<^>	<^>	<^>	<^>
VO DYuSSh	·	·	·	·	→	·	·	·	·	·	B1	B2	A1	<^>	<^>	<^>	<^>	<^>
Voskhod Stara Mayachka	·	·	·	·	→	·	·	·	·	·	C4	B1	<^>	<^>	<^>	<^>	·	·
Bahira Kropyvnytskyi	·	·	·	·	→	·	·	·	·	·	·	B4	·	·	·	B8	·	·
Season	1992	1993	1994	1995	...	2012	2013	2014	2015	2016	2017	2017/18	2018/19	2019/20	2020/21	2021/22	2022/23	2023/24
Teams	8	6	0	0	→	0	10	8	9	14	11	11	11	10	10	18	5	16
Karpaty Lviv	·	·	·	·	→	·	·	·	·	·	·	·	A2	A1	<^>	<^>	·	·
Bukovynska Nadia	·	·	·	·	→	·	·	·	·	·	·	·	A5	A2	<^>	·	·	·
Kolos Kovalivka (Vyshneve)	·	·	·	·	→	·	·	·	·	·	·	·	B2	B2	1	<^>	<^>	<^>
Veres Rivne (Rodyna)	·	·	·	·	→	·	·	·	·	·	·	·	·	·	4	A3	<^>	<^>
Dynamo Kyiv (OKIP-SDYuShOR 16)	·	·	·	·	→	·	·	·	·	·	·	·	·	·	6	A1	<^>	<^>
Kobra Bilokurakyne	·	·	·	·	→	·	·	·	·	·	·	·	·	·	9	B7	·	·
Iunist Chernihiv	·	·	·	·	→	·	·	·	·	·	·	·	·	·	7	B3	2	B3
DYuSSh 26 Kyiv	·	·	·	·	→	·	·	·	·	·	·	·	·	·	·	A2	·	·
Ladomyr-2 Volodymyr	·	·	·	·	→	·	·	·	·	·	·	·	·	·	·	A7	·	A4
Rukh Lviv (Chempion)	·	·	·	·	→	·	·	·	·	·	·	·	·	·	·	A9	4	A7
Ateks(-SDYuShOR 16) Kyiv	·	·	·	·	→	<^>	<^>	<^>	<^>	<^>	<^>	<^>	B3	B4	2	<^>	<^>	B5
Shakhtar Donetsk	·	·	·	·	→	·	·	·	·	·	·	·	·	·	·	B1	<^>	<^>
Persha Stolytsia Kharkiv	·	·	·	·	→	·	·	·	·	·	·	·	·	·	·	B5	·	·
Chornomorets Odesa	·	·	·	·	→	·	·	·	·	·	·	·	·	·	·	B6	·	·
Lider Kobeliaky	·	·	·	·	→	·	·	·	·	·	·	·	·	·	·	·	1	B4
FC Mynai	·	·	·	·	→	·	·	·	·	·	·	·	·	·	·	·	·	3
Nadbuzhia Busk	·	·	·	·	→	·	·	·	·	·	·	·	·	·	·	·	·	A5
Zhaivir Shpola	·	·	·	·	→	·	·	·	·	·	·	·	·	·	·	·	·	B7
Kryvbas-2 Kryvyi Rih	·	·	·	·	→	·	·	·	·	·	·	·	·	·	·	·	·	B6
Metalurh Zaporizhia	·	·	·	·	→	·	·	·	·	·	·	·	·	·	·	·	·	B8
Obolon Kyiv	·	·	·	·	→	·	·	·	·	·	·	·	·	·	·	·	·	2
Season	1992	1993	1994	1995	...	2012	2013	2014	2015	2016	2017	2017/18	2018/19	2019/20	2020/21	2021/22	2022/23	2023/24
Teams	8	6	0	0	→	0	10	8	9	14	11	11	11	10	10	18	5	16
Seasters Odesa	·	·	·	·	→	·	·	·	·	·	·	·	·	·	·	·	·	1

==== 2024–present ====
Season	2024/25	2025/26	2026/27
Teams	15	15	12
Yunist Chernihiv	4	B3	<^>
Prykarpattia DYuSSh-3	A6	A5	check
Pantery Uman	<^>	<^>	<^>
DYuSSh 1 Khmelnytskyi	A3	A3	<^>
Polissia Zhytomyr	<^>	<^>	<^>
Mariupol	3	1	<^>
Ladomyr Volodymyr-Volynskyi	<^>	<^>	<^>
EMS Podillia (VO DYuSSh)	<^>	<^>	<^>
Pohoryna Kostopil (Rodyna)	1	4	<^>
Vol. Litsei (Ladomyr-2)	A5	A7	check
Rukh Lviv (Chempion)	A7	A6	·
Ateks(-SDYuShOR 16) Kyiv	B3	B6	check
Shakhtar Donetsk	<^>	<^>	<^>
Lider Kobeliaky	B4	B4	check
Uzhhorod (Mynai)	2	2	<^>
Nadbuzhia Busk	A4	A4	check
Zhaivir Shpola	B7	B7	check
Obolon Kyiv	<^>	·	·
Seasters Odesa	<^>	<^>	<^>
Zhyt. Litsei (Polissia-2)	B6	B5	check
Season	2024/25	2025/26	2026/27
Teams	15	15	12
DYuSSh Podil Kyiv	B5	3	<^>
Panchokha Novyi Zavod	B8	·	·
Yantarochka Novoyavorivsk	·	A8	check
SDIuShOR Uzhhorod	·	·	check
Tesla Kharkiv	·	·	check
Chornomorets Odesa	·	·	check
OFKIP-Polissya Kyiv	·	·	check

=== League participants by region ===
In bold are shown active teams

Region	CoA	Nos.	Participants
Kyiv		9	Radosyn, Olimp-2, Ateks-2, Dynamo (OKIP), DYuSSh-26, **Ateks**[-SDYuShOR-16], Obolon, DYuSSh Podil, **OFKIP-Polissya**
Lviv Oblast		6*	Lvivianka Lviv, Medyk Morshyn, **Iantarochka Novoyavorivsk**, Karpaty Lviv, Rukh Lviv, **Nadbuzhia Busk**
Luhansk Oblast		4	Iunisa Luhansk, Kontek Luhansk, Luhanochka Luhansk (Zorya), Kobra Bilokurakyne
Donetsk Oblast		4	Tekstylnyk Donetsk, Bahira Krasnyi Lyman, Mariupol (Lehion, Mariupolchanka), Shakhtar Donetsk
Zhytomyr Oblast		4	Viktoriya Lyubar, Polissya Zhytomyr, **Zhytomyrskyi Litsei (Polissya-2)**, Panchokha Novyi Zavod
Kharkiv Oblast		4*	KDYuSSh 8 Kharkiv, Nika Pervomaisky Raion, Persha Stolytsia Kharkiv, **Tesla Kharkiv**
Mykolaiv Oblast		3	Lada Mykolaiv, DYuSSh Voznesensk, Nika Mykolaiv (Torpedo)
Poltava Oblast		3*	Nika Poltava, Vorskla Poltava (Zhytlobud-2), **Lider Kobeliaky**
Zaporizhzhia Oblast		3	Iskra Zaporizhzhia, Stymul-ZDU Zaporizhzhia, Metalurh Zaporizhia
Cherkasy Oblast		3	Iatran Berestivets, Pantery Uman (DYuSSh-1), **Zhaivir Shpola**
Odesa Oblast		3	Chornomorochka Odesa, **Chornomorets Odesa**, Seasters Odesa
Vinnytsia Oblast		2	Kolos-Mriya Makhnivka, VO DYuSSh
Kherson Oblast		2	Tavriya Kherson, Voskhod Stara Mayachka
Kirovohrad Oblast		2	Mriya Kirovohrad, Bahira Kropyvnytskyi
Volyn Oblast		2	Ladomyr Volodymyr, **Volodymyrskyi Litsei (Ladomyr-2)**
Dnipropetrovsk Oblast		2	Dnipro-1 (Zlahoda), Kryvbas-2 Kryvyi Rih
Chernihiv Oblast		2	Spartak Chernihiv, Iunist Chernihiv
Zakarpattia Oblast		2	Uzhhorod (Mynai), **SDIuShOR Uzhhorod**
Khmelnytskyi Oblast		1	DYuSSh-1 Khmelnytskyi (Derazhianochka)
Ivano-Frankivsk Oblast		1	**Prykarpattia-DYuSSh-3 Ivano-Frankivsk**
Ternopil Oblast		1*	Ternopilchanka Ternopil
Sumy Oblast		1	SumDU-Barsa Sumy
Chernivtsi Oblast		1	Bukovynska Nadia
Kyiv Oblast		1	Kolos Kovalivka (SC Vyshneve)
Rivne Oblast		1	Pohoryna Kostopil (Rodyna, Veres)
