= 2026–27 Ukrainian Women's First League =

Persha Liha
- Season: 2026–27
- Dates: September 2026 – April 2027 (group stage); May 2027 (playoffs)
- Teams: 12 in 2 groups

The 2026–27 Ukrainian Women's First League season is the inaugural season of Ukraine's third-tier women's football league and the 17th season in the Ukrainian Women's First League.

With the introduction of the Ukrainian Women's Prime League, the Ukrainian Women's First League has been downgraded to the third level starting from the 2026–27 season.

== Format ==
The third-tier competition (First League) is conducted in two groups, split based on geographical location. In both groups, competitions are conducted in the triple round-robin format (3 round-robins). Following the group stage, teams from each group will contest their placed position in a group with the opposing team from the other group. Thus, there will be 6 ties in the playoffs involving all teams. The top teams from each group will qualify for the promotion to the Ukrainian Higher League.

== Teams ==
8 out of the 15 participants from last season entered the competition. They were joined by 4 more teams out of which Chornomorets Odesa and OFKIP Kyiv were those that have played previously.

=== Returning ===
- Chornomorets Odesa – last competed in the 2021–22 season
- OFKIP-Polissya Kyiv – last competed in the 2020–21 season as OFKIP-SDYuShOR-16 Kyiv

=== Debuting ===
SDYuShOR Uzhhorod, Tesla Kharkiv

=== Withdrew ===
- Rukh Lviv – withdrew after 5 seasons

== Group stage ==
=== Group A ===
Pos	Team	Pld	W	D	L	GF	GA	GD	Pts	
1	Nadbuzhia Busk	6	5	1	0	25	3	+22	16	Promotion to Vyshcha Liha
2	SDYuShOR Uzhhorod	5	4	0	1	10	5	+5	12	
3	Prykarpattia-DIuSSh-3 Iv.Frankivsk	6	2	2	2	20	5	+15	8	
4	Zhytomyrskyi litsei	5	2	2	1	14	5	+9	8	
5	Volodymyrskyi litsei	6	1	1	4	4	22	−18	4	
6	Iantarochka Novoyavorivsk	6	0	0	6	4	37	−33	0	

Updated to match(es) played on 25 October 2026. Source: womensfootball.com.ua
Rules for classification: 1) Points; 2) Head-to-head points; 3) Head-to-head goal difference; 4) Goal difference in all matches; 4) Goals scored in all matches; 6) Fair play.

Notes:

- The round 1 game Nadbuzhia vs Iantarochka that ended in an 11:1 win for the Busk team was kept unchanged. At the same time, Iantarochka received a technical loss because the Novoyavorivsk team used players under 15.

=== Group B ===
Pos	Team	Pld	W	D	L	GF	GA	GD	Pts	
1	OFKIP Kyiv	4	4	0	0	27	2	+25	12	Promotion to Vyshcha Liha
2	Ateks Kyiv	5	2	2	1	13	10	+3	8	
3	Tesla Kharkiv	5	2	1	2	7	18	−11	7	
4	Chornomorets Odesa	5	2	0	3	18	20	−2	6	
5	Lider Kobeliaky	6	1	2	3	8	16	−8	5	
6	Zhaivir Shpola	5	1	1	3	7	14	−7	4	

Updated to match(es) played on 27 October 2026. Source: womensfootball.com.ua
Rules for classification: 1) Points; 2) Head-to-head points; 3) Head-to-head goal difference; 4) Head-to-head goals scored; 5) Goal difference; 6) Goals scored.

Notes:

- The round 2 game Tesla vs Zhaivir that ended in a 1:2 win for the Shpola team was canceled and annulled. Instead, Zhaivir received a technical loss (0:3) and Tesla a technical win (3:0) because the Shpola team used players under 15.

== Number of teams by region ==
Number	Region	Team(s)
2	Kyiv	Ateks, OFKIP
2	Lviv Oblast	Iantarochka Novoyavorivsk, Nadbuzhia Busk
1	Cherkasy Oblast	Zhaivir Shpola
1	Ivano-Frankivsk Oblast	Prykarpattia-DIuSSh-3 Ivano-Frankivsk
1	Kharkiv Oblast	Tesla Kharkiv
1	Odesa Oblast	Chornomorets Odesa
1	Poltava Oblast	Lider Kobeliaky
1	Volyn Oblast	Volodymyrskyi litsei
1	Zakarpattia Oblast	SDIuShOR Uzhhorod
1	Zhytomyr Oblast	Zhytomyrskyi litsei

== See also ==
- 2026–27 Ukrainian Women's Prime League
- 2026–27 Ukrainian Women's Higher League
- 2026–27 Ukrainian Women's Cup
