= 2024–25 Ukrainian Women's Higher League =

Ukrainian Women's League
- Season: 2024–25
- Champions: Vorskla Poltava
- Relegated: SC Dnipro-1 (withdrew); Obolon Kyiv (withdrew)
- UEFA Women's Champions League: Vorskla Poltava; Metalist 1925 Kharkiv
- Europa Cup: Kolos Kovalivka
- Top goalscorer: Yuliya Stets (Polissya); Yelyzaveta Molodyuk (Metalist 1925); 18 goals

The 2024–25 season of the Ukrainian Football Championship is the 34th season of Ukraine's top women's football league. Consisting of two tiers it started on 6 August 2024 with the game in Kyiv between Podillia Vinnytsia and Metalist 1925 Kharkiv.

== Format ==
The format of competitions for the season was preserved from the last season. The Higher (Vyshcha) League kept the format consisting of two stages. At the first stage all 12 teams play single round robin with top 6 teams qualify for the Championship group and bottom 6 teams to Relegation group. Each group conducts double round robin tournament. The bottom team is to be relegated while 4th and 5th teams of Relegation table will contest their berth in the Higher League with better teams of the First League (2nd tier).

The First (Persha) League consists of two groups one with 7 and the other with 8. Each group conducts double round robin tournament with the top 2 teams from each group qualify for the championship play-off consisting of semi-finals, final and the match for the third place. The Champion of the First League gets direct promotion, while 2nd and 3rd will contest their berth in the Higher League with the worst teams of the Higher League (1st tier).

== Vyshcha Liha teams ==
Locations of teams in the 2024–25 Ukrainian Championship Higher League

=== Team changes ===
Promoted	Relegated
Seasters Odesa; Obolon Kyiv; Polissia Zhytomyr	Mariupol; Veres Rivne; Dynamo Kyiv (withdrew); Dnipro-1 (withdrew)

=== Other changes ===
- SC Dnipro-1 folded right before the start of the season.
- FC Dynamo Kyiv dissolved its women's team once again and instead signed a cooperation agreement with WFC Ladomyr Volodymyr.

== Vyshcha Liha stadiums ==
Due to ongoing Russian aggression against Ukraine, many teams played their games in Kyiv or its suburbs. Critical role in providing a playing turf for the league's participant played Arsenal Arena and Livyi Bereh in the Kyiv's eastern suburbs Shchaslyve and Hnidyn.

Team	Home city	Home ground	Capacity
Dnipro-1	Dnipro	Dnipro Training Base	N/A
Kolos	Kovalivka	Kolos	5,000
Kryvbas	Kryvyi Rih	Hirnyk	2,500
Ladomyr	Volodymyr	Olimp	2,000
Obolon	Kyiv	Obolon Arena	5,100
Pantery	Uman	Tsentralny Stadion	7,552
EMS Podillia	Vinnytsia	Tsentralnyi Stadion Stadion Palatsu ditey i yunatstva	24,000 1,500
Polissia	Zhytomyr	Spartak Arena	1,242
Metalist 1925	Kharkiv	Arsenal Arena (Shchaslyve)	1,000
Shakhtar	Donetsk	Arsenal Arena (Shchaslyve)	1,000
Seasters	Odesa	Chornomorets	34,164
Vorskla	Poltava	Vorskla	24,795

== Vyshcha Liha managers ==
Club	Head coach	Replaced coach
Ladomyr Volodymyr	(Ukraine) Oleh Bortnik	
Kryvbas Kryvyi Rih	(Ukraine) Kostiantyn Frolov	
Vorskla Poltava	(Ukraine) Iya Andrushchak	(Ukraine) Volodymyr Yefimako
Polissia Zhytomyr	(Ukraine) Mykola Podrannyi	
Obolon Kyiv	(Ukraine) Tetyana Verezubova	(Ukraine) Iryna Vasylyuk
EMS-Podillia Vinnytsia	(Ukraine) Oleksandr Dudnik	
Seasters Odesa	(Ukraine) Yevhen Dodurych	
Pantery Uman	(Ukraine) Yuriy Derenyuk	
Kolos Kovalivka	(Ukraine) Lyudmyla Pokotylo	
Shakhtar Donetsk	(Ukraine) Roman Zayev	
Dnipro-1		
Metalist 1925 Kharkiv	(Ukraine) Volodymyr Pyatenko	

Team	Outgoing manager	Manner of departure	Date of vacancy	Table	Incoming manager	Date of appointment	Table
Vorskla Poltava	(Ukraine) Volodymyr Yefimako		11 January 2025	1st	(Ukraine) Iya Andrushchak	11 January 2025	

== Vyshcha Liha First Stage ==
=== League table ===
Pos	Team	Pld	W	D	L	GF	GA	GD	Pts	Qualification or relegation
1	Vorskla Poltava	10	9	1	0	41	0	+41	28	Qualification for the Championship Group
2	Kolos Kovalivka	10	9	0	1	39	3	+36	27	Qualification for the Championship Group
3	Metalist 1925 Kharkiv	10	7	2	1	34	6	+28	23	Qualification for the Championship Group
4	Seasters Odesa	10	7	1	2	24	8	+16	22	Qualification for the Championship Group
5	Shakhtar Donetsk	10	4	2	4	16	16	0	14	Qualification for the Championship Group
6	Ladomyr Volodymyr	10	3	2	5	16	19	−3	11	Qualification for the Championship Group
7	Kryvbas Kryvyi Rih	10	3	1	6	12	20	−8	10	Qualification for the Relegation Group
8	Pantery Uman	10	2	1	7	7	40	−33	7 (Note: Head-to-head points: Pantery 4, Polissia 3, EMS-Podillia 1)	Qualification for the Relegation Group
9	Polissia Zhytomyr	10	2	1	7	15	32	−17	7	Qualification for the Relegation Group
10	EMS Podillia Vinnytsia	10	2	1	7	6	39	−33	7	Qualification for the Relegation Group
11	Obolon Kyiv	10	0	2	8	6	33	−27	2	Qualification for the Relegation Group
12	Dnipro-1	0	0	0	0	0	0	0	0	Withdrew

Source: womensfootball.com.ua
Rules for classification: 1) Points; 2) Head-to-head points; 3) Head-to-head goal difference; 4) Head-to-head goals scored; 5) Goal difference; 6) Goals scored.

=== Results ===
Home \ Away	DNI	KOL	KRY	LAD	M25	OBL	PAN	POD	PZH	SHA	STR	VOR
Dnipro-1						dnp		dnp	dnp	dnp		dnp
Kolos Kovalivka	dnp		3–0			5–0		10–0	4–1	3–0		
Kryvbas Kryvyi Rih	dnp			1–1	1–2	3–0			1–2			
Ladomyr Volodymyr	dnp	0–2			0–3		6–1				0–1	
Metalist 1925 Kharkiv	dnp	1–2				5–0	3–0				2–2	
Obolon Kyiv				1–3				2–3	1–1	1–1		0–5
Pantery Uman	dnp	0–9	0–1			3–0			2–1		0–6	
EMS Podillia Vinnytsia			0–4	1–0	0–9		1–1			0–1		0–5
Polissia Zhytomyr				3–4	0–5			4–1		1–4		0–7
Shakhtar Donetsk			1–0	2–2	1–4		6–0				0–3	0–2
Seasters Odesa	dnp	0–1	2–1			4–1		3–0	3–2			
Vorskla Poltava		1–0	9–0	4–0	0–0		7–0				1–0	

Updated to match(es) played on 12 November 2024. Source: womensfootball.com.ua
Legend: Blue = home team win; Yellow = draw; Red = away team win.

=== Results by week ===
Team ╲ Round	1	2	3	4	5	6	7	8	9	10
Kolos Kovalivka	L	W	W	W	W	W	W	W	W	W
Kryvbas Kryvyi Rih	L	L	L	L	L	W	L	D	W	W
Ladomyr Volodymyr	D	L	L	W	W	L	W	D	L	L
Metalist 1925 Kharkiv	W	W	W	W	W	W	D	L	W	D
Obolon Kyiv	L	L	L	D	L	L	L	L	L	D
Pantery Uman	W	L	W	L	L	L	L	D	L	L
EMS Podillia Vinnytsia	L	W	W	L	L	L	L	D	L	L
Polissia Zhytomyr	L	W	L	D	L	L	L	L	L	W
Shakhtar Donetsk	D	L	L	W	L	W	W	W	L	D
Seasters Odesa	W	W	L	L	W	W	W	W	W	D
Vorskla Poltava	W	W	W	W	W	D	W	W	W	W

Updated to match(es) played on 12 November 2024. Source: womensfootball.com.ua
W = Win; D = Draw; L = Loss

== Championship round ==
=== Championship round table ===
Pos	Team	Pld	W	D	L	GF	GA	GD	Pts	
1	Vorskla Poltava (Note: Participant of the 2024–25 Ukrainian Women's Cup final.) (C)	20	16	4	0	63	2	+61	52	Qualification for Champions League second qualifying round
2	Metalist 1925 Kharkiv	20	15	4	1	62	7	+55	49	Qualification for Champions League second qualifying round
3	Kolos Kovalivka	20	14	1	5	55	13	+42	43	Qualification for Europa Cup first qualifying round
4	Seasters Odesa	20	10	1	9	35	26	+9	31	
5	Shakhtar Donetsk	20	7	3	10	25	36	−11	24	
6	Ladomyr Volodymyr	20	3	3	14	17	55	−38	12	

Source: womensfootball.com.ua
Rules for classification: 1) Points; 2) Head-to-head points; 3) Head-to-head goal difference; 4) Head-to-head goals scored; 5) Goal difference; 6) Goals scored.
(C) Champions

=== Results ===
Home \ Away	KOL	LAD	MET	SHA	STR	VOR
Kolos Kovalivka		1–0	0–2	3–0	2–0	1–1
Ladomyr Volodymyr	0–5		0–5	1–1	0–4	0–4
Metalist 1925 Kharkiv	2–0	6–0		4–0	3–1	0–0
Shakhtar Donetsk	3–0 (Note: Originally ending in 0:0 tie, the match result between Shakhtar Donetsk vs Kolos Kovalivka was later changed to 3:0 win for Shakthar due to Kolos fielding ineligible player, not mentioned in the referee report.)	2–0	0–4		1–0	1–3
Seasters Odesa	0–4	3–0	0–2	3–1		0–1
Vorskla Poltava	2–0	5–0	0–0	2–0	4–0	

Source: WFPL.UA
Legend: Blue = home team win; Yellow = draw; Red = away team win.

== Relegation round ==
=== Relegation round table ===
Pos	Team	Pld	W	D	L	GF	GA	GD	Pts	
7	Kryvbas Kryvyi Rih	18	10	1	7	39	30	+9	31	
8	Polissia Zhytomyr	18	7	2	9	46	45	+1	23	
9	Pantery Uman	18	7	1	10	17	57	−40	22	
10	Obolon Kyiv	18	2	3	13	11	43	−32	9	Withdrew after the season
11	EMS-Podillia Vinnytsia	18	2	1	15	13	69	−56	7	

Source: womensfootball.com.ua
Rules for classification: 1) Points; 2) Head-to-head points; 3) Head-to-head goal difference; 4) Head-to-head goals scored; 5) Goal difference; 6) Goals scored.

=== Results ===
Home \ Away	KRY	OBL	PAN	POD	PZH
Kryvbas Kryvyi Rih		2–1	5–0	4–2	4–1
Obolon Kyiv	0–1		1–2	1–0	1–1
Pantery Uman	1–3	1–0		2–1	2–1
EMS-Podillia Vinnytsia	0–5	0–1	1–2		2–7
Polissia Zhytomyr	5–3	3–0	5–0	8–1	

Source: WFPL.UA
Legend: Blue = home team win; Yellow = draw; Red = away team win.

== Relegation play-offs ==
The relegation–promotion play-off games were scheduled to take place between the 10th and 11th placed teams in the Relegation group of the Higher League (Vyshcha Liha), with the second and third placed teams of the First League (Persha Liha).

In the First League, the best of two teams from each of the two groups would enter a play-off mini-tournament where the first of each group plays against the second team of the other group. The winners of the two semifinal pairs play each other for the tier's title, which also grants a direct promotion to the Higher League; at the same time, the losing team as runner-up (second place) meets with the 11th-placed team of the Higher League in the promotion-relegation playoff. The two losing teams of the mentioned semifinal pairs also play each other for the tier's third place, and the winner of it enters the second playoff matchup with the 10th-placed team of the Higher League in the promotion-relegation playoff.

On 16 May 2025, the UAF Women's Football Committee announced that the playoffs between the First League teams and the Higher League teams will not take place since no teams from the First League (including Mynai, Pohoryna, Yunist, and Mariupol) passed the attestation for the Higher League, and, thus, cannot get promoted.

== Statistics ==
=== Top scorers ===
As of 6 May 2025

Rank	Player	Club	Goals
1	Yuliya Stets	Ladomyr → Polissya	17
2	Yelyzaveta Molodyuk	Metalist 1925 Kharkiv	16
3	Roksolana Kravchuk	Vorskla Poltava	14
4	Viktoriya Hiryn	Ladomyr → Metalist 1925	11 (2)
5	Olha Osipyan	Vorskla Poltava	10
5	Tetyana Tril	Polissia Zhytomyr	10 (1)
5	Yana Kalinina	Vorskla Poltava	10 (2)
8	Veronika Andrukhiv	Kolos Kovalivka	9
8	Darya Kolodiy	Kryvbas Kryvyi Rih	9
8	Violeta Tyan	Kolos Kovalivka	9 (2)

=== Clean sheets ===
As of 6 May 2025

Rank	Player	Club	Clean sheets
1	(Ukraine) Kateryna Samson	Vorskla Poltava	15
2	(Ukraine) Darya Kelyushyk	Kolos Kovalivka	9
3	(Ukraine) Daryna Bondarchuk	Metalist 1925 Kharkiv	7

== See also ==
- 2024–25 Ukrainian Premier League
- 2024–25 Ukrainian Women's Cup
