= 2025–26 Ukrainian Women's First League =

Persha Liha
- Season: 2025–26
- Dates: 6 September 2025 – 29 April 2026 (group stage); 2 – 9 May 2026 (playoffs)
- Teams: 15 in 2 groups
- Champions: Mariupol Uzhhorod (Group A) and Mariupol (Group B)
- Promoted: Uzhhorod, Mariupol, Pohoryna Kostopil, DIuSSh Podil Kyiv, DIuSSh-1 Khmelnytskyi, Yunist Chernihiv

The 2025–26 Ukrainian Women's First League season is a season of Ukraine's second-tier women's football league.

The competition is conducted parallel to competitions in the 2025–26 Ukrainian Women's Top League as part of the Ukrainian Women's Championship.

== Format ==
The second-tier competition (First League) is conducted in two groups, split based on geographical location. In both groups, competitions were conducted in the round-robin format. The top two teams from each group will advance to the playoffs. The top three teams from each group will be moved (promoted) to the reformed Higher League next season.

== Teams ==
It was expected that 16 teams would compete this season, but Metalist 1925 Kharkiv changed their mind to have another of their squads in the competitions. 14 out of the 15 participants from last season entered the competition. They were joined by Iantarochka, which returned after a season.

=== Returning ===
- Iantarochka Novoyavorisk

=== Withdrew ===
- Panchokha Novyi Zavod
- Metalist 1925-2 Kharkiv

== Group stage ==
=== Group A ===
Pos	Team	Pld	W	D	L	GF	GA	GD	Pts	
1	Uzhhorod (Note: During the season's intermission in winter, the women's team from Uzhhorod changed its name. Before the start of the 2025–26 season, FC Mynai officially withdrew from competitions, yet its women's team continued to play. All points that FC Mynai earned during the first half of the season were transferred to WFC Uzhhorod.) (P, C)	14	12	1	1	77	5	+72	37	Qualification to playoffs Promotion to Vyshcha Liha
2	Pohoryna Kostopil (P)	14	11	2	1	36	5	+31	35	Qualification to playoffs Promotion to Vyshcha Liha
3	DIuSSh-1 Khmelnytskyi (P)	14	8	1	5	24	17	+7	25	Promotion to Vyshcha Liha
4	Nadbuzhia Busk	14	8	0	6	33	25	+8	24	
5	Prykarpattia-DIuSSh-3 Iv.Frankivsk	14	5	1	8	24	17	+7	16 (Note: Head-to-head goal difference: Prykarpattia-DIuSSh-3 +1, Rukh -1.)	
6	Rukh Lviv	14	5	1	8	25	25	0	16	
7	Volodymyrskyi litsei	14	4	0	10	35	39	−4	12	
8	Iantarochka Novoyavorivsk	14	0	0	14	3	124	−121	0	

Updated to match(es) played on 25 April 2026. Source: womensfootball.com.ua
Rules for classification: 1) Points; 2) Head-to-head points; 3) Head-to-head goal difference; 4) Goal difference in all matches; 4) Goals scored in all matches; 6) Fair play.
(C) Group winner; (P) Promotion to Vyshcha Liha next season

=== Group B ===
Pos	Team	Pld	W	D	L	GF	GA	GD	Pts	
1	Mariupol (P, C)	12	9	3	0	38	9	+29	30	Qualification to play-offs Promotion to Vyshcha Liha
2	Podil Kyiv (P)	12	7	3	2	24	9	+15	24	Qualification to play-offs Promotion to Vyshcha Liha
3	Yunist ShVSM Chernihiv (P)	12	5	3	4	15	12	+3	18	Promotion to Vyshcha Liha
4	Lider Kobeliaky	12	4	3	5	12	24	−12	15	
5	Zhytomyrskyi litsei	12	2	4	6	12	23	−11	10	
6	Ateks Kyiv	12	2	3	7	10	22	−12	9 (Note: Head-to-head points: Ateks 4, Zhaivir 1.)	
7	Zhaivir Shpola	12	2	3	7	8	20	−12	9	

Source: womensfootball.com.ua
Rules for classification: 1) Points; 2) Head-to-head points; 3) Head-to-head goal difference; 4) Head-to-head goals scored; 5) Goal difference; 6) Goals scored.
(C) Group winner; (P) Promotion to Vyshcha Liha next season

== Playoffs ==
The top two teams from each group will play off to determine the winners of the Persha Liha competitions. Unlike the previous season, this season the winners of both groups play each other in a two-leg format, and the runners-up of the same two groups play one another for third place in the same format. (see the Season's Regulations Article 8, paragraph 1.2, page 64)

=== First place final ===
Team 1	Agg.	Team 2	1st leg	2nd leg
First leg – May 2, Second leg – May 8
Uzhhorod	4 – 4 (8–9 p)	Mariupol	3–2	1–2

2 May 2026	Uzhhorod	3–2	Mariupol	Uzhhorod
13:00	Kateryna Yakymchuk 14', 24', 65'	Report	Yuliya Palamarchuk 45'; Karina Lyulenko 75'	Stadium: Avanhard; Referee: Yana Dutchak

8 May 2026	Mariupol	2–1 (9–8 p)	Uzhhorod	Kyiv
12:00	Karina Lyulenko (penalty missed) 62'; Polina Polukhina 72' (pen.); Yuliya Palamarchuk 88'	Report	Kateryna Yakymchuk 24'	Stadium: imeni Bannikova
	Penalties
	Amilina Tarsukova (penalty scored); Viktoriya Kunytska (penalty scored); Karina Lyulenko (penalty missed); Yuliya Palamarchuk (penalty scored); Polina Polukhina (penalty scored); Darya Kruk (penalty scored); Mariya Yahushchyn (penalty scored); Veronika Kuzenkova (penalty scored); Iryna Smahlyuk (penalty scored); Anastasiya Fedosenko (penalty scored)		(penalty scored) Kseniya Orlovska; (penalty scored) Viktoriya Klykova; (penalty missed) Daryna Huts; (penalty scored) Alina Kolodiy; (penalty scored) Dariya Chonka; (penalty scored) Anastasiya Hrymak; (penalty scored) Kateryna Yakymchuk; (penalty scored) Oleksandra Litus; (penalty scored) Sofiya-Mariya Zozulya; (penalty missed) Viktoriya Borova

=== Third place finals ===
Team 1	Agg.	Team 2	1st leg	2nd leg
First leg – May 2, Second leg – May 9
Pohoryna Kostopil	0 – 0 (1–3 p)	DIuSSh Podil Kyiv	0–0	0–0

2 May 2026	Pohoryna Kostopil	0 – 0	DIuSSh Podil Kyiv	Kostopil, Rivne Oblast
14:00		Report		Stadium: Kolos

7 May 2026	DIuSSh Podil Kyiv	0 – 0 (3–1 p)	Pohoryna Kostopil	Kyiv
14:00		Report		Stadium: Podil Arena; Referee: Anastasiya Lishchuk
	Penalties
	Sofya Sereda (penalty scored); Myroslava Lavryk (penalty scored); Iryna Mokbel (penalty scored)		(penalty missed) Kateryna Shevchuk; (penalty scored) Kateryna Derkach; (penalty missed) Yana Nadiezhdina; (penalty missed) Daryna Halushko

== Number of teams by region ==
Number	Region	Team(s)
3	Lviv Oblast	Iantarochka Novoyavorivsk, Nadbuzhia Busk, Rukh Lviv
2	Kyiv	Ateks, Podil
1	Cherkasy Oblast	Zhaivir Shpola
1	Chernihiv Oblast	Iunist Chernihiv
1	Donetsk Oblast	Mariupol
1	Ivano-Frankivsk Oblast	Prykarpattia-DIuSSh-3 Ivano-Frankivsk
1	Khmelnytskyi Oblast	DIuSSh-1 Khmelnytskyi
1	Poltava Oblast	Lider Kobeliaky
1	Rivne Oblast	Pohoryna Kostopil
1	Volyn Oblast	Ladomyr-2 Volodymyr
1	Zakarpattia Oblast	Uzhhorod
1	Zhytomyr Oblast	Polissya-2 Zhytomyr

== See also ==
- 2025–26 Ukrainian Women's Higher League
- 2025–26 Ukrainian Women's Cup
