= FC Polissya Zhytomyr (women) =

Polissya
- Full name: Football Club Polissya
- Founded: 2016
- Ground: Polissya training center, Hlybochytsia, Zhytomyr Oblast
- Manager: Mykola Podrannyi
- League: Ukrainian Women's Prime League
- 2025–26: 6th

The FC Polissya Zhytomyr women's team is a Ukrainian professional women's team of their parent Football Club Polissya out of the city of Zhytomyr.

== Overview ==
=== Name change ===
- 2016 Polisianochka
- 2017–2019 Polissya (Polissya Zhytomyr)
- 2023–present Polissya (Polissya Zhytomyr)

=== History ===
The team's establishment was announced in late 2016. The announcement stated that the MFC Zhytomyr women's team would be based on the Polisianochka football team that made their debut in the 2016 Ukrainian Women's First League. Results of Polisianochka were grandfathered for the new Polissya team. In May 2017 MFC Zhytomyr was renamed as FC Polissya Zhytomyr and the new women's team made their debut as Polissya in the 2017 Ukrainian Women's First League. Just like Polisianochka in the previous season, Polissya placed last in their group. For the next several seasons, Polissya struggled until 2019, when the team was excluded from competitions for not showing up for two games.

Polissya returned to competitions for the 2023–24 Ukrainian Women's First League, placing second behind FC Mynai women's team in the group, which qualified them for playoffs. Polissya lost both matches and did not receive direct qualification for the Ukrainian Women's Higher League. However, due to the FC Dynamo women's team's withdrawal, Polissya was admitted to the 2024–25 Ukrainian Women's Higher League. Since resuming their participation at the Ukrainian football competitions, Polissya plays their home games at the newly-built Polissya traning center, which was constructed in 2023 in the Zhytomyr exurb of Hlybochytsia, just east of the city.

In 2026, Polissya qualified for the new 2026–27 Ukrainian Women's Prime League.

== Head coaches ==
- 2017–2019 Oleksandr Stashenko
- 2023–present Mykola Podrannyi

== Season by season ==
Season	Tier	Division (Group)	Place	Ukrainian Cup
2016	2	1ª League (Group 1)	5th	
2017	2	1ª League (Group 2)	4th	
2017–18	2	1ª League (Group 1)	3rd	
2018–19	2	1ª League (Group 2)	excluded	
2023–24	2	1ª League (Group 1)	2nd	
2024–25	1	Higher League (Relegation Group)	8th	
2025–26	1	Higher League (Relegation Group)	6th	
2026–27	1	Prime League		

- 3 seasons in top tier
- 5 seasons in second tier

== FC Polissya academy and reserves ==
FC Polissya Zhytomyr has their own football academy, which provides new homegrown players for all their teams, both male and female. For the 2024–25 season, after the Polissya main women's team was admitted to the top tier, they fielded a second team, Polissya-2, in the second tier. Next season, Polissya-2 was withdrawn, conceding their place to a football team from the Zhytomyr sports lyceum.
