= 2024–25 Ukrainian Women's Cup =

Tournament details
- Country: Ukraine
- Dates: 11 September 2024 – 10 June 2025
- Teams: 12

Final positions
- Champions: Vorskla Poltava (5th title)
- Runners-up: Metalist 1925 Kharkiv

The 2024–25 Ukrainian Women's Cup was the 31st season of Ukrainian knockout competitions among women teams.

Twelve teams of the Ukrainian Women's Football Championship are contesting the main trophy: 11 representing the Higher League (Vyshcha Liha) and 1 representing the First League (Persha Liha).

== Teams allocation and format ==
=== Participating teams ===
Enter in Preliminary round		Enter in Quarterfinals
First League; 1/15 teams	Higher League; 7/11 teams	Higher League; 4/11 teams
Nadbuzhia Busk	EMS-Podillya Vinnytsia; Ladomyr Volodymyr; Obolon Kyiv; Pantery Uman; Polissya Zhytomyr; Seasters Odesa; Shakhtar Donetsk	Vorskla Poltava; Metalist 1925 Kharkiv; Kolos Kovalivka; Kryvbas Kryvyi Rih

Notes:

- SC Dnipro-1 was removed from competitions.

=== Rounds schedule ===
Phase	Round	Number of fixtures	Clubs remaining	Draw date	Game date
Qualification		4	8 → 4	20 August 2024	11 September 2024
Main event	Quarter-finals	4	8 → 4	13 September 2024	16 November 2024
Main event	Semi-finals	2	4 → 2	5 May 2025	21 May 2025
Main event	Final	1	2 → 1	5 May 2025	10 June 2025

== Bracket ==
Preliminary round
Obolon Kyiv (p)	1 (3)
Shakhtar Donetsk	1 (2)
Pantery Uman	1
Polissya Zhytomyr	3
Nadbuzhia Busk	0
Seasters Odesa	5
EMS-Podillya Vinnytsia	1
Ladomyr Volodymyr	3

Quarter-finals
Obolon Kyiv	0
Metalist 1925 Kharkiv	4
Kolos Kovalivka	4
Kryvbas Kryvyi Rih	0
Polissya Zhytomyr	0
Vorskla Poltava	5
Ladomyr Volodymyr	0
Seasters Odesa	1

Semi-finals
Metalist 1925 Kharkiv	4
Kolos Kovalivka	0
Seasters Odesa	0
Vorskla Poltava	3

Final
Vorskla Poltava	1
Metalist 1925 Kharkiv	0

== Competition schedule ==
=== Preliminary round ===
This round featured 7 lower-ranked clubs from the Higher League and 1 club from the First League.

The draw for this round was held on 20 August 2024.

11 September 2024	Obolon Kyiv (I)	1–1 (a.e.t.) (3–2 p)	(I) Shakhtar Donetsk	Kyiv
15:00	Yaryna Skiryak 110'	Report	Sofiya Lutsan (red card) 21'; Nataliya Chendey 119'	Stadium: Obolon Arena; Referee: Sofiya Prychyna
	Penalties
	Daryna Lyebyedeva (penalty scored); Sofiya Skvortsova (penalty scored); Yuliya Hnydyuk (penalty missed); Svitlana Tkachenko (penalty missed); Iryna Vasylyuk (penalty scored)		Anastasiya Lyakhovych (penalty missed); Diana Kravchuk (penalty scored); Viktoriya Myronenko (penalty missed); Alina Starukhina (penalty scored); Nataliya Chendey (penalty missed)

11 September 2024	Pantery Uman (I)	1–3	(I) Polissia Zhytomyr	Uman, Cherkasy Oblast
14:00	Oksana Bilokur 76'	Report	Yuliya Semenyuk 10', 33', 60'; Diana Mushchenska (yellow card) 31' (yellow-red card) 42'	Stadium: Tsentralnyi Stadion; Referee: Nataliya Mamchur

11 September 2024	Nadbuzhia Busk (II)	0–5	(I) Seasters Odesa	Busk, Lviv Oblast
12:00		Report	Olha Boychenko 9'; Josephine Ngandi 19'; Jenefer Da Costa 42'; Yana Kharchyna 51' (o.g.); Darya Ivkova 80' (pen.)	Stadium: DYuSSh; Referee: Oleksandra Leshchenko

11 September 2024	EMS-Podillia Vinnytsia (I)	1–3	(I) Ladomyr Volodymyr	Vinnytsia
12:00	Yelyzaveta Rudenko 84'	Report	Yuliya Stets 26'; Viktoriya Hiryn 34' (pen.), 48' (pen.)	Stadium: Nyva training base Referee: Kateryna Ruda

=== Quarterfinals ===
In this round, the remaining 4 clubs from the Higher League entered the competition and joined the 4 winners of the Preliminary round (4 clubs from the Higher League).

The draw for this round was held on 13 September 2024.

16 November 2024	Obolon Kyiv (I)	0–4	(I) Metalist 1925 Kharkiv	Kyiv
		Report	Tamila Khimych 5'; Iryna Shabalina (Kochnyeva) 47'; Olha Basanska 62'; Lesya Olkhova 88' (pen.)	Stadium: Obolon Arena; Referee: Kristina Kozoroh

16 November 2024	Polissia Zhytomyr (I)	0–5	(I) Vorskla Poltava	Zhytomyr
		Report	Iryna Podolska 11'; Kateryna Korsun 17'; Roksolana Kravchuk 39'; Mariya Taleb 79'; Olga Osipyan 89'	Stadium: Polissya training center Referee: Kateryna Usova

1 March 2025	Kolos Kovalivka (I)	4–0	(I) Kryvbas Kryvyi Rih	Sofiyivska Borshchahivka, Kyiv Oblast
	Darina Krasnoborodko 45+2'; Veronika Andrukhiv 67'; Violeta Tyan 70'; Dayana Semkiv 90'	[ Report]		Stadium: Kolos training base Referee: Veronika Vasylchenko (Tahamlyk)

2 May 2025	Ladomyr Volodymyr (I)	0–1	(I) Seasters Odesa	Volodymyr, Volyn Oblast
12:00		Report	Josephine Ngandi 51' (pen.)	Stadium: Olimp; Referee: Anastasia Romanyuk

=== Semifinals ===
The draw for the semifinals and the final took place on 5 May 2025.

21 May 2025	Metalist 1925 Kharkiv (I)	4–0	(I) Kolos Kovalivka	Shchaslyve, Kyiv Oblast
	Yuliya Shevchuk 39'; Darya Apanashchenko 45'; Yelyzaveta Molodyuk 53'; Olha Basanska 65'	Report		Stadium: Arsenal Arena; Referee: Veronika Vasylchenko

21 May 2025	Seasters Odesa (I)	0–3	(I) Vorskla Poltava	Odesa
		Report	Mariya Taleb 44'; Viktoriya Radionova 50', 69' (pen.)	Stadium: Chornomorets; Referee: Kristina Kozoroh

=== Final ===
10 June 2025	Vorskla Poltava (I)	1–0	(I) Metalist 1925 Kharkiv	Rivne
16:00	Maryna Shainyuk	Report		Stadium: Avanhard; Attendance: 600; Referee: Lyudmyla Telbukh

== See also ==
- 2024–25 Ukrainian Women's League
- 2024–25 Ukrainian Cup
