= Semen Altman =

Ukrainian football coach and goalkeeper (born 1946)

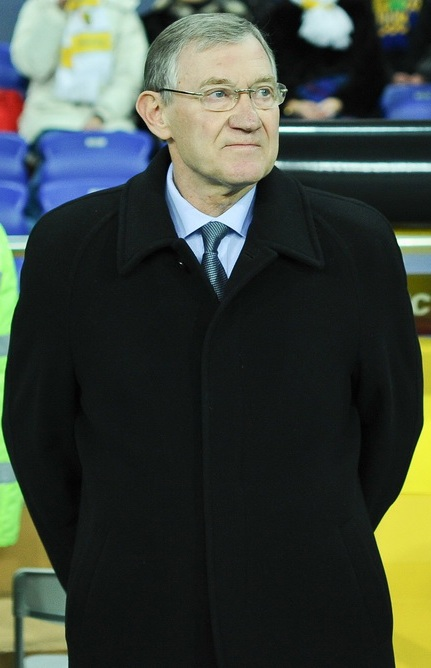
- Altman in 2011

Personal information
- Full name: Semen Yosypovych Altman
- Date of birth: 21 April 1946 (age 80)
- Place of birth: Chuhuiv, Ukrainian SSR, Soviet Union
- Height: 1.80 m (5 ft 11 in)
- Position: Goalkeeper

Team information
- Current team: SeaSters (assistant)

Youth career
- Kyiv Sport School #1

Senior career*
Years	Team	Apps	(Gls)
1965	Kolhospnyk Rivne	3	
1965–1966	Volyn Lutsk	15	
1966–1972	Chornomorets Odesa	70	
1973	Zvezda Tiraspol		
1974	Lokomotyv Kherson		
1975	Zvezda Tiraspol		

Managerial career
- 1982–1988: Chornomorets Odesa
- 1989–1991: Dynamo Moscow
- 1991–1994: Chornomorets Odesa
- 1994–1996: Korea Olympic team
- 1996–1999: Zimbru Chişinău
- 1999–2002: Metalurh Donetsk
- 2003–2006: Ukraine (assistant)
- 2003–2007: Chornomorets Odesa
- 2007: Illychivets Mariupol
- 2008: Luch-Energiya Vladivostok
- 2010: Ukraine (assistant)
- 2011–2012: Tavriya Simferopol
- 2019: Moldova
- 2025–: SeaSters (assistant)
- * Club domestic league appearances and goals

Semen Yosypovych Altman (Ukrainian: Семен Йосипович Альтман, born 21 April 1946) is a Ukrainian football coach and former goalkeeper. He is of Jewish ancestry.

Semen's son, Hennadiy Altman is also a goalkeeper and has followed his father to many of the teams Semen has coached over the years.

== Career ==
Altman played for Kolhospnyk (Rivne), Volyn (Lutsk), Chornomorets (Odesa), Zvezda (Tiraspol), Lokomotiv (Kherson).

=== Coach ===
He has worked as a coach of FC Chornomorets Odesa (1982–88), FC Dynamo Moscow (1989–91), Chornomorets (1991–94), Korea Olympic team (1994–96), FC Zimbru Chișinău (1996–99), Metalurh Donetsk (1999–2002), and Chornomorets again (2003–2007). Semen Altman was also Oleh Blokhin's assistant coach for the Ukraine national football team from 2003 to 2006. In 2007 Altman was replaced by Vitaliy Shevchenko at Chornomorets. In 2007, he was hired by FC Illychivets Mariupol as head coach on a one-year contract. On 14 December 2007, Semen was unexpectedly sacked, despite winning the first leg of the quarterfinal Ukrainian Cup match against his former club Chornomorets, and the club sitting in 2nd place at the time. In October 2008 he was appointed as head-coach of FC Luch-Energiya Vladivostok.

In late 2019 he was Moldova's coach for 4 matches in UEFA Euro 2020 qualifying, which included a 0–1 loss to Andorra. In the 2021-22 season he was part of FC Balkany Zorya coaching staff, which competed in Ukrainian Second League.

In the summer of 2025, Semen Altman joined the staff of Denys Kolchin, who headed the SeaSters.

== Honours ==
=== As Coach ===
- 2006 FIFA World Cup
  - Quarter-finalist (as assistant-coach)
- Ukrainian Premier League
  - Bronze medals: 2001–02, 2002–03 (both with Metalurh Donetsk); 2005–06 (with Chornomorets Odesa)
- Moldovan National Division (all with FC Zimbru Chișinău)
  - Champion: 1997–98, 1998–99
  - Silver medals: 1996–97
- Moldova Cup
  - Winner: 1996–97, 1997–98
