= 2026–27 Ukrainian Women's Cup =

Tournament details
- Country: Ukraine
- Dates: 29 August 2026 – TBA
- Teams: 17

The 2026–27 Ukrainian Women's Cup is the 33rd season of Ukrainian knockout competitions among women's teams.

Seventeen teams of the Ukrainian Women's Football Championship are contesting the main trophy: 8 representing the Prime League (Praim Liha), 7 representing the Higher League (Vyshcha Liha) and 2 representing the First League (Persha Liha). This is a lower number of participants than the last season.

Metalist 1925 Kharkiv are the defending champions who had won the competition in the last season.

== Team allocation and schedule ==
The competition includes all professional first teams from the Prime League (8/8 teams of the league) and Higher League (7/7 teams of the league), along with teams with non-professional status from the First League (2/12).

Distribution
	Teams entering this round	Teams advancing from the previous round
Preliminary round (2 teams)	2 entrants of First League	
Round of 16 (16 teams)	8 entrants of the Prime League 7 entrants of the Higher League	1 winner from the Preliminary round

=== Rounds schedule ===
Phase	Round	Number of fixtures	Clubs remaining	Draw date	Game date
Preliminary		1	2 → 1	21 July 2026	29 August 2026
Main event	Round of 16	8	16 → 8	15 September 2026	1 October 2026
Main event	Quarter-finals	4	8 → 4		
Main event	Semi-finals	2	4 → 2		
Main event	Final	1	2 → 1		

=== Teams ===
Enter in Preliminary	Enter in Round of 16	
First League; 2/12 teams	Higher League; 7/7 teams	Prime League; 8/8 teams
Chonomorets Odesa; OFKIP-Polissya Kyiv	EMS-Podillya Vinnytsia; Uzhhorod; Mariupol; Podil Kyiv; Pohoryna Kostopil; Iunist Chernihiv; DIuSSh 1 Khmelnytskyi	Kolos Kovalivka; Kryvbas Kryvyi Rih; Metalist 1925 Kharkiv; Shakhtar Donetsk; Ladomyr Volodymyr; Pantery Uman; Seasters Odesa; Polissya Zhytomyr

== Competition schedule ==
=== Preliminary Round ===
In this round, 2 clubs from the First League played one another to determine the winner who would proceed to the Round of 16.

30 August 2026	Chornomorets Odesa (III)	(0–3)	(III) OFKIP-Polissya Kyiv	Shchaslyve, Kyiv Oblast
		Report		Stadium: Arsenal Arena (indoor); Referee: Kateryna Ruda

- The game started late on 30 August 2026 and was then interrupted several times due to air raid alerts. On 24 September 2026, the UAF CDC adopted a decision regarding the Cup tournament game, awarding a technical victory to OFKIP Kyiv with a score of 3:0, and a technical loss to Chornomorets Odesa with a score of 0:3 for refusing to finish the game. Chornomorets Odesa was fined 10,000 hryvnia.

=== Round of 16 ===
In this round, 8 clubs from the Prime League and 7 clubs from the Higher League entered the competition and were joined by the Preliminary Round winner (1 club from the First League).

1 October 2026	DIuSSh-1 Khmelnytskyi (II)	0 – 2	(II) Mariupol	Khmelnytskyi
13:00		Report	Karina Lyulenko 30', 60'	Stadium: DIuSSh-1; Referee: Yana Dutchak

1 October 2026	Kolos Kovalivka (I)	3 – 0	(I) Pantery Uman	Kovalivka, Kyiv Oblast
12:00	Sofiya Solomakha 49'; Dayana Semkiv 72'; Anastasiya Zabytivska 78'	Report		Stadium: Kolos; Referee: Anastasiya Lishchuk

1 October 2026	Shakhtar Donetsk (I)	1 – 2	(I) Seasters Odesa	Shchaslyve, Kyiv Oblast
12:00	Nadiya Veherych 19'	Report	Diana Tkachuk 35'; Arina Kravets 39'	Stadium: Arsenal Arena; Referee: Veronika Vasylchenko

1 October 2026	Uzhhorod (II)	1 – 5	(I) Polissya Zhytomyr	Uzhhorod
13:00	Kseniya Orlovska 90+1'	Report	Diana Mushchenska 9', 15'; Tetiana Tril 24'; Valentyna Tarakanova 35'; Nataliya Kornatska 55'	Stadium: Avanhard; Referee: Nataliya Mamchur

3 October 2026	Metalist 1925 Kharkiv (I)	6 – 0	(I) Kryvbas Kryvyi Rih	Boryspil, Kyiv Oblast
12:00	Olha Basanska 3', 10'; Yelyzaveta Molodyuk 12', 18'; Anastasiya Bielkina 64'; Arina Paskarenko 66'	Report		Stadium: Kolos; Referee: Oleksandra Leshchenko

4 October 2026	Podil Kyiv (II)	1 – 4	(I) Ladomyr Volodymyr	Volodymyr, Volyn Oblast
11:00	Myroslava Lavryk 13'	Report	Dariya Klantsata 23'; Bozhena Dub 28'; Viktoriya Savkina 52'; Darya Artemenko 58'	Stadium: Olimp; Referee: Yana Dutchak

4 October 2026	EMS-Podillia Vinnytsia (II)	3 – 0	(II) Iunist Chernihiv	Vinnytsia
11:00	Diana Borovska 2', 88'; Yuliya Pyrohivska 78'	Report		Stadium: Nyva training base Referee: Nataliya Mamchur

TBD	OFKIP Kyiv (III)	v	(II) Pohoryna Kostopil

== See also ==
- 2026–27 Ukrainian Women's Prime League
- 2026–27 Ukrainian Women's Higher League
- 2026–27 Ukrainian Women's First League
- 2026–27 Ukrainian Cup
