= FC Seasters =

Ukrainian women's association football club

SeaSters
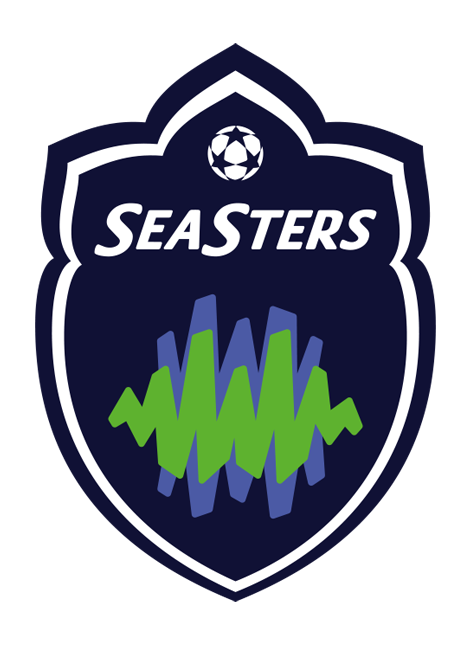
- Full name: Women's Football Team; SeaSters Odesa
- Nickname: Sea Sisters
- Short name: SeaSters FC
- Founded: 2023
- Stadium: Chornomorets, Odesa
- Capacity: 34,164
- Chairman: Oleksandr Androsov
- Head coach: Anatoliy Didenko
- League: Ukrainian Women's Prime League
- 2025–26: 2nd
- Website: seasters.football

The SeaSters is a Ukrainian professional women's football team from Odesa, Ukraine. The club's home ground is Chornomorets Stadium.

== History ==
The SeaSters football club was officially founded in the summer of 2023. The club's president Oleksandr Androsov, is a Ukrainian television anchorman and a host of the Ukrainian version of What? Where? When? game show.

Since the club was founded, Yevhen Dodurych, a former coach of such teams as FC Chornomorets Odesa (women) and FC Palmira, was appointed as the team's first head coach. The captain of the newly formed team was the experienced striker of the Ukrainian national team, Olha Boychenko, who is a multiple champion of Ukraine, a participant in the Women's European Championship and the quarterfinals of the UEFA Women's Champions League.

In the debut season of 2023–24, the SeaSters played in the Ukrainian Women's First League. The Odesa team confidently won that championship and has been promoted to play in the Ukrainian Women's Top League.

On June 28 2025, was announced that Denys Kolchin has been hired as a new head coach of the SeaSters, with Semen Altman being one of his team. In January 2026 Kolchin has left the team and joined Chornomorets-2. On January 9 2026, Anatoliy Didenko became the new head coach of Seasters. In the 2025–26 season, the team finished second in the Ukrainian Championship and earned the right to play in the UEFA Champions League second qualifying round.

== European record ==
FC SeaSters made their debut in European competitions on 5 August 2026 in the 2026–27 UEFA Women's Champions League qualifying rounds. They faced the Sporting CP and lost 0–5. On 8 August 2026 in a third-place play-off match FC SeaSters won 3–1 against BSC YB Frauen and earned the right to play in the 2026–27 UEFA Women's Europa Cup first qualifying round. The first goal for Seasters was scored by Yana Kalinina.

Season	Competition	Stage	Result	Opponent
2026–27	UEFA Women's Champions League	Qualifying Round 2	0–5	(Portugal) Sporting CP
2026–27	UEFA Women's Champions League	Qualifying Round 2	3–1	(Switzerland) BSC YB Frauen
–	UEFA Women's Europa Cup	Qualifying Round 1	1–0	(Norway) Rosenborg BK
–	UEFA Women's Europa Cup	Qualifying Round 1	0–3	(Norway) Rosenborg BK

== Players ==
=== Notable players ===
Note: Players whose name is listed in bold represented their countries (national or/and olympic team) while playing for FC Seasters.

Ukraine

- (Ukraine) Olha Boychenko
- (Ukraine) **Daria Vorontsova**
- (Ukraine) **Kateryna Samson**
- (Ukraine) **Yana Kalinina**

Armenia

- (Armenia) Olga Osipyan

== Managers ==
- (Ukraine) Yevhen Dodurych (2023–2025)
- (Ukraine) Denys Kolchin (2025)
- (Ukraine) **Anatoliy Didenko (2026 – present)**

== Honours ==
=== Domestic achievements ===
- Ukrainian Women's Higher League
  - Runners-up (1): 2025–26
- Ukrainian Women's First League
  - **Winners** (1): 2023–24
