= 2026–27 Ukrainian Women's Higher League =

Vyshcha Liha
- Season: 2026–27
- Dates: 15 August 2026 – May 2027
- Teams: 7
- Matches: 17
- Goals: 50 (2.94 per match)
- Top goalscorer: Kateryna Yakymchuk (4 goals)
- Biggest home win: Uzhhorod 4–0 Pohoryna (26 September 2026)
- Biggest away win: DIuSSh 1 1–8 Uzhhorod (20 September 2026)
- Highest scoring: DIuSSh 1 1–8 Uzhhorod (20 September 2026)
- All statistics correct as of 26 September 2026.

The 2026–27 Ukrainian Women's Higher League season is the 36th season of the league. Due to the 2026–27 Ukrainian women's football reform, it was downgraded to the second tier of the women's football pyramid. It started on August 15, 2026, and is expected to finish in May of 2027.

== Format ==
Besides the league's downgrade, the format of this season's competitions has changed from the previous season.

Compared to the previous season, the Higher (Vyshcha) League returned to the format consisting of a single stage. The number of participants was reduced to 7. There will be three round robins, with every club playing 18 season's matches. The top placed clubs (1st place) will qualify for promotion to the Elite League if it would pass certification, while the runner-up (2nd place) will qualify for the promotion/relegation playoffs with the 7th placed team of the Elite League. After winning the promotion/relegation playoffs, the league's runner-up may get promoted if it would pass certification. If no clubs would pass certification for the Elite League, there will be no promotions. The bottom placed team will be relegated to the First League.

== Teams ==
Due to the 2026–27 Ukrainian women's football reform, the number of participants was reduced, and the top 8 clubs of the previous season formed the new Elite League. Following the Vorskla Poltava withdrawal, only one club remained in the league. It was joined by 6 newly promoted clubs from the First League.

Promoted	Relegated
Mariupol; Uzhhorod; Podil Kyiv; Pohoryna Kostopil; DIuSSh 1 Khmelnytskyi; SDIuShOR Iunist Chernihiv	Vorksla Poltava (withdrew)

Locations of teams in the 2026–27 Ukrainian Championship Higher League

== Vyshcha Liha stadiums ==
Team	Home city	Home ground	Capacity
Pohoryna	Kostopil	Kolos	1,330
Uzhhorod	Uzhhorod	Avanhard	10,383
DIuSSh 1	Khmelnytskyi	Podillya	6,800
Mariupol	Mariupol	Sofiyivskyi, Sofiivska Borshchahivka	
EMS Podillia	Vinnytsia	Nyva training field	—
Podil	Kyiv	Podil Arena	743
SDIuShOR Iunist Chernihiv	Chernihiv	Yunist Stadium	3,000

== Vyshcha Liha managers ==
Club	Head coach	Replaced coach
SDIuShOR Iunist Chernihiv	Lyudmyla Lemeshko	
Podil Kyiv	Oleksandr Topchiy	
Mariupol	Karina Kulakovska	
DIuSSh 1 Khmelnytskyi	Oleksandr Osatskyi	
EMS-Podillia Vinnytsia	Oleksandr Dudnik	
Pohoryna Kostopil	Olena Ruda	
Uzhhorod	Anastasiya Sirmay	

Team	Outgoing manager	Manner of departure	Date of vacancy	Table	Incoming manager	Date of appointment	Table

== Vyshcha Liha First Stage ==
Pos	Team	Pld	W	D	L	GF	GA	GD	Pts	Qualification or relegation
1	Uzhhorod	7	5	1	1	24	5	+19	16	Promotion to the Prime League
2	EMS-Podillya Vinnytsia	7	5	0	2	10	4	+6	15	Qualification for the playoffs
3	Mariupol	7	3	1	3	11	10	+1	10	
4	Pohoryna Kostopil	7	3	1	3	9	9	0	10	
5	Podil Kyiv	8	3	0	5	10	14	−4	9	
6	SDIuShOR Iunist Chernihiv	5	2	1	2	3	3	0	7	
7	DIuSSh 1 Khmelnytskyi	7	1	0	6	3	25	−22	3	Relegation to the Persha Liha

Updated to match(es) played on 1 November 2026. Source: womensfootball.com.ua
Rules for classification: 1) Points; 2) Head-to-head points; 3) Head-to-head goal difference; 4) Goal difference; 5) Goals scored; 6) Fair play score; 7) Draw of lots.

=== Results ===
Home \ Away	D1K	SUC	MAR	EMS	POD	POK	UZH	D1K	SUC	MAR	EMS	POD	POK	UZH
DIuSSh 1 Khmelnytskyi		ppd	0–4		0–4	0–5	1–8							
SDIuShOR Iunist Chernihiv	2–1		ppd	1–0		ppd								
Mariupol	2–0			0–3 (Note: The Round 6 game Mariupol vs EMS-Podillya, scheduled to be played on 25 September 2026, was postponed to a later date.)		1–1	1–3							
EMS-Podillya Vinnytsia	0–1				2–1		2–1							
Podil Kyiv		1–0	1–3	0–1		2–1	1–6							
Pohoryna Kostopil		1–0		0–2	1–0									
Uzhhorod		0–0	2–0			4–0								

Updated to match(es) played on 1 November 2026. Source: womensfootball.com.ua (in Ukrainian)
Legend: Blue = home team win; Yellow = draw; Red = away team win.
Notes:

Additional notes:

=== Teams' form ===
Team ╲ Round	1	2	3	4	5	6	7	8	9	10	11	12	13	14	15	16	17	18
DIuSSh 1 Khmelnytskyi	L	L	L	W	L	L	L											
SDIuShOR Iunist Chernihiv	W	L	W	D	L													
Mariupol	L	W	D	W	L	L	W											
EMS Podillya Vinnytsia	W	L	L	W	W	W	W											
Podil Kyiv	W	L	L	L	W	W	L	L										
Pohoryna Kostopil	L	W	W	D	L	L	W											
Uzhhorod	W	W	D	W	W	L	W											

Updated to match(es) played on 1 November 2026. Source: womensfootball.com.ua
W = Win; D = Draw; L = Loss

== Vyshcha Liha top goalscorers ==
As of 1 November 2026

Rank	Scorer	Team	Goals (Pen.)
1	Diana Borovska	EMS-Podillia Vinnytsia	6 (0)
2	Iryna Oliynychenko	Uzhhorod	5 (0)
2	Kateryna Yakymchuk	Uzhhorod	5 (0)
4	Sofiya Barakhtyan	Podil Kyiv	4 (0)

- Own goals: Yelizaveta Holyk (Mariupol for Uzhhorod), Ruslana Aliyeva (Uzhhorod for EMS-Podillya), Khrystyna Klym (DIuSSh Khmelnytskyi for Mariupol)

== See also ==
- 2026–27 Ukrainian Women's Cup
- 2026–27 Ukrainian Women's Prime League
- 2026–27 Ukrainian Women's First League
- 2026–27 Ukrainian Second League
- 2026–27 Ukrainian First League
