= 2025–26 Ukrainian Women's Cup =

Tournament details
- Country: Ukraine
- Dates: 16 August 2025 – 27 May 2026
- Teams: 25

Final positions
- Champions: Metalist 1925 Kharkiv (12th title)
- Runners-up: Kolos Kovalivka

Tournament statistics
- Top goal scorer(s): Valeriya Litus; 4 goals

The 2025–26 Ukrainian Women's Cup was the 32nd season of Ukrainian knockout competitions among women's teams.

Twenty-five teams of the Ukrainian Women's Football Championship were contesting the main trophy: 10 representing the Higher League (Vyshcha Liha) and 15 representing the First League (Persha Liha). This was a record number of participants since the inception of the competition back in 1992.

Vorskla Poltava were the defending champions who had won the competition in the last three seasons. They were routed in the semi-finals by Metalist 1925 Kharkiv 0:5.

== Team allocation and schedule ==
The competition includes all professional first teams from the Higher League (10/10 teams of the league) and teams with non-professional status from the First League (15/16).

Distribution
	Teams entering this round	Teams advancing from the previous round
First qualification round (14 teams)	14 entrants of First League	
Second qualification round (8 teams)	1 entrant of the First League (Zhaivir Shpola)	7 winners from the First qualification round
Third qualification round (4 teams)	no new entrants	4 winners from the Second qualification round
Fourth qualification round (8 teams)	6 entrants of the Higher League (lower seeded)	2 winners from the Third qualification round
Quarter-finals (8 teams)	4 entrants of the Higher League (higher seeded)	4 winners from the Fourth qualification round

=== Rounds schedule ===
Phase	Round	Number of fixtures	Clubs remaining	Draw date	Game date
Qualification	First round	7	14 → 7	30 July 2025	16-20 August 2025
Qualification	Second round	4	8 → 4	30 July 2025	23 August 2025
Qualification	Third round	2	4 → 2	30 July 2025	2 September 2025
Qualification	Fourth round	4	8 → 4	4 September 2025	14 September 2025
Main event	Quarter-finals	4	8 → 4	22 October 2025	19 November 2025
Main event	Semi-finals	2	4 → 2	1 March 2026	4 April 2026
Main event	Final	1	2 → 1	27 May 2026	

=== Teams ===
Enter in First qualification	Enter in Second qualification	Enter in Fourth qualification	Enter in Quarterfinals
First League; 14/16 teams	First League; 1/16 team	Higher League; 6/10 teams	Higher League; 4/10 teams
Ateks Kyiv; Mariupol; Pohoryna Kostopil; DYuSSh 1 Khmelnytskyi; Lider Kobelyaky; Yunist Chernihiv; Rukh Lviv; Prykarpattia-DYuSSh 3; Nadbuzhia Busk; Volodymyrskyi Litsei; Zhytomyrskyi Litsei; DYuSSh Podil Kyiv; Yantarochka Novoyavorivsk; Mynai	Zhaivir Shpola	Shakhtar Donetsk; Ladomyr Volodymyr; Kryvbas Kryvyi Rih; Polissya Zhytomyr; Pantery Uman; EMS-Podillya Vinnytsia	Vorskla Poltava; Metalist 1925 Kharkiv; Kolos Kovalivka; Seasters Odesa

Notes:

- One reserve team from the First League was not eligible to participate.

=== Bracket ===
Fourth round
Pantery Uman (p)	1 (4)
Ladomyr Volodymyr	1 (2)
Polissya Zhytomyr	8
EMS-Podillya Vinnytsia	1
Mariupol	0
Shakhtar Donetsk	7
Mynai	0
Kryvbas Kryvyi Rih	2

Quarter-finals
Kolos Kovalivka	3
Pantery Uman	0
Polissya Zhytomyr (p)	2 (4)
Shakhtar Donetsk	2 (3)
Kryvbas Kryvyi Rih	0
Metalist 1925 Kharkiv	1
Seasters Odesa	0
Vorskla Poltava	3

Semi-finals
Polissya Zhytomyr	0
Kolos Kovalivka	4
Vorskla Poltava	0
Metalist 1925 Kharkiv	5

Final
27 May — imeni Bannikova, Kyiv
Metalist 1925 Kharkiv	1
Kolos Kovalivka	0

== Competition schedule ==
=== First qualifying round ===
The draw for this round was held on 30 July 2025.

16 August 2025	Ateks Kyiv (II)	1 – 1 (3–5 p)	(II) Mariupol	Kyiv
14:30	Oleksandra Kalitynska 27'	Report	Karolina Dzhaharyan 18'	Stadium: Rusanivets; Referee: Alyona Kvasha (Kyiv Oblast)
	Penalties
	Karina Lyulenko (penalty scored); Darya Zhukova (penalty missed); Oleksandra Kalitynska (penalty scored); Darya Shevchenko (penalty scored)		Amilina Tarsukova (penalty scored); Viktoriya Kunytska (penalty scored); Karolina Dzhaharyan (penalty scored); Alina Kaydalovska (penalty scored); Polina Polukhina (penalty scored)

16 August 2025	Pohoryna Kostopil (II)	2 – 0	(II) DYuSSh 1 Khmelnytskyi	Kostopil, Rivne Oblast
16:00	Vladyslava Nezdyur 21'; Ivanna Bolvanets 70'	Report		Stadium: Kolos; Attendance: 70; Referee: Nataliya Mamchur (Rivne)

17 August 2025	Lider Kobelyaky (II)	3 – 0 (Note: administrative result)	(II) Yunist Chernihiv	Kobelyaky, Poltava Oblast
?:?		Report		Stadium: Kolos

17 August 2025	Rukh Lviv (II)	1 – 1 (4–5 p)	(II) Prykarpattia-DYuSSh-3	Vynnyky, Lviv
13:00	Khrystyna Klym (penalty missed) 40'; Ivanna Horodechna 79'	Report	Anastasiya Drozdova 36' (pen.)	Stadium: Rukh training base Referee: Mariya Zobenko
	Penalties
	Khrystyna Klym (penalty scored); Yana Peteletska (penalty scored); Sofiya Yuzva (penalty scored); Marharyta Shpak (penalty scored); Ivanna Horodechna (penalty missed)		Khrystyna Masnyuk (penalty scored); Anastasiya Drozdova (penalty scored); Evelina Vozna (penalty scored); Iryna Vasenyova (penalty scored); Nelia Zherebukh (penalty scored)

17 August 2025	Nadbuzhia Busk (II)	1 – 2	(II) Volodymyrskyi Litsei	Busk, Lviv Oblast
13:00	Inna Buy 70'	Report	Sofiya Sheinska 83'; Svitlana Nechytailo 87'	Stadium: Busk DYuSSh; Referee: Yana Dutchak (Ivano-Frankivsk Oblast)

17 August 2025	Zhytomyrskyi Litsei (II)	0 – 2	(II) DYuSSh Podil Kyiv	Zhytomyr
16:00		Report	Iryna Mokbel 34'; Yelyzaveta Savina 90+1'	Stadium: Spartak Arena; Attendance: 100; Referee: Oleksandra Leshchenko (Zaporizhia)

20 August 2025	Yantarochka Novoyavorivsk (II)	0 – 3 (Note: administrative result)	(II) Mynai	Novoyavorivsk, Lviv Oblast
?:?		Report		Stadium: imeni Rusyna

=== Second qualification round ===
22 August 2025	Zhaivir Shpola (II)	2 – 2 (4–2 p)	(II) Lider Kobelyaky	Lebedyn, Cherkasy Oblast
15:00	Marharyta Ruchka 28'; Tamila Voloshyna 61'	Report	Darya Hrebenyuk 40', 53'	Stadium: LNZ Arena; Referee: Alyona Kvasha
	Penalties
	Anastasiya Tupchiyenko (penalty scored); Alina Hordiyenko (penalty scored); Milana Fedosenko (penalty scored); Kseniya Nemanikhina (penalty scored)		Darya Hrebenyuk (penalty scored); Anhelina Kazmirchuk (penalty scored); Kateryna Babenko (penalty missed); Liliya Oleksenko (penalty missed)

23 August 2025	Mynai (II)	7 – 0	(II) Prykarpattia-DYuSSh-3	Mynai, Zakarpattia Oblast
13:00	Valeriya Litus 39', 45+1', 51', 63'; Bohdana Huley 76'; Anastasiya Hrymak 80'; Oleksandra Litus 88'	Report		Stadium: Mynai; Referee: Anastasiya Suponina

23 August 2025	Pohoryna Kostopil (II)	2 – 0	(II) Volodymyrskyi Litsei	Kostopil, Rivne Oblast
16:00	Viktoriya Taborovets 64'; Kateryna Derkach 71'	Report		Stadium: Kolos; Attendance: 45; Referee: Yana Dutchak

31 August 2025	Mariupol (II)	2 – 0	(II) DYuSSh Podil Kyiv	Kyiv
12:00	Polina Polukhina 11' (pen.); Yuliya Palamarchuk 45+1'	Report		Stadium: Podil Arena; Referee: Alyona Kvasha

=== Third qualifying round ===
2 September 2025	Pohoryna Kostopil (II)	0 – 1	(II) Mynai	Kostopil, Rivne Oblast
12:00	Yana Nadiezhdina (red card) 63'	Report	Oleksandra Litus 5'	Stadium: Kolos; Referee: Mariya Zobenko

10 September 2025	Mariupol (II)	2 – 0	(II) Zhaivir Shpola	Kyiv
12:00	Amilina Tarsukova 51' (pen.); Karina Kulakovska 87' (pen.)	Report		Stadium: Rusanivets; Referee: Oleksandra Leshchenko

=== Fourth qualification round ===
6 teams of the Higher League (lower ranking) were joined with the winners of the third qualification round.

13 September 2025	Pantery Uman (I)	1 – 1 (4–2 p)	(I) Ladomyr Volodymyr	Uman, Cherkasy Oblast
11:00	Lidiya Lashko 54'	Report	Viktoriya Savkina 62'	Stadium: Tsentralnyi Stadion; Referee: Kateryna Ruda
	Penalties
	Mariya Tykhonova (penalty scored); Ivanice Santos Neves (penalty scored); Oksana Bilokur (penalty scored); Lidiya Lashko (penalty missed); Iryna Rybalkina (penalty scored)		(penalty missed) Myroslava Nevar; (penalty missed) Zoriana Hladun; (penalty scored) Ariana Cherednychenko; (penalty scored) Dana Korotchuk

14 September 2025	FC Mynai (II)	0 – 2	(I) Kryvbas Kryvyi Rih	Mynai, Zakarpattia Oblast
11:00		Report	Veronika Neposhyvailenko 7'; Darya Zaporozhets 15'	Stadium: Mynai; Referee: Anastasiya Suponina

14 September 2025	Polissya Zhytomyr (I)	8 – 1	(I) EMS-Podillya Vinnytsia	Zhytomyr
12:00	Yuliya Stets 22', 29'; Tetiana Tril 25', 28', 56'; Daryna Sichkarenko 47'; Valentyna Tarakanova 63'	Report	Arina Paskarenko 45'; Veronika Derevyanko 90' (o.g.)	Stadium: Polissya training field Referee: Alyona Kvasha

14 September 2025	Mariupol (II)	0 – 7	(I) Shakhtar Donetsk	Shchaslyve, Kyiv Oblast
17:00		Report	Nadiya Chaika 13', 62'; Viktoriya Myronenko 18'; Nadiya Veherych 24', 69'; Viktoriya Holovach 33'; Liubov Mokhnach 88'	Stadium: Arsenal-Arena; Referee: Oksana Pankiv

=== Quarter-finals ===
4 teams of the Higher League (upper ranking) were joined with the winners of the fourth qualification round. The draw for the round took place during the training session of the Ukraine national team in the Slovak city of Trnava.

19 November 2025	Kryvbas Kryvyi Rih (I)	0 – 1	(I) Metalist 1925 Kharkiv	Kryvyi Rih, Dnipropetrovsk Oblast
12:00		Report	Lesya Olkhova 7'	Stadium: Sparta; Referee: Lyudmyla Telbukh (Dnipro)

19 November 2025	Seasters Odesa (I)	0 – 3	(I) Vorskla Poltava	Odesa
12:00		Report	Yana Kalinina 11'; Anastasiya Voronina 14'; Anastasiya Kumeda 62'	Stadium: Chornomorets; Referee: Mariya Zobenko (Kyiv Oblast)

19 November 2025	Kolos Kovalivka (I)	3 – 0	(I) Pantery Uman	Kovalivka, Kyiv Oblast
12:00	Darina Krasnoborodko 20'; Dayana Semkiv 40', 50' (pen.)	Report		Stadium: Kolos; Referee: Kristina Kozoroh (Kyiv Oblast)

19 November 2025	Polissya Zhytomyr (I)	2 – 2 (4 – 3 p)	(I) Shakhtar Donetsk	Zhytomyr
12:00	Daryna Sichkarenko 16'; Nataliya Kornatska 39'; Olha Danets (red card) 72'	Report	Viktoriya Myronenko 31'; Nadiya Veherych 59'	Stadium: Polissya training center Referee: Sofiya Prychyna (Lviv Oblast)
	Penalties
	Daryna Sichkarenko (penalty scored); Vita Rozlutska (penalty missed); Nataliya Kornatska (penalty scored); Alina Synko (penalty scored); Sofiya Nyzova (penalty scored)		(penalty scored) Nadiya Veherych; (penalty scored) Diana Kravchuk; (penalty missed) Nadiya Chaika; (penalty missed) Viktoriya Holovach; (penalty scored) Alina Starukhina

=== Semi-finals ===
3 April 2026	Polissya Zhytomyr (I)	0 – 4	(I) Kolos Kovalivka	Zhytomyr
12:00		Report	Viktoriya Ostapiv 45'; Darina Krasnoborodko 47', 84'; Anastasiya Kumeda 90'	Stadium: Spartak Arena; Attendance: 48; Referee: Sofiya Prychyna (Lviv Oblast)

4 April 2026	Vorskla Poltava (I)	0 – 5	(I) Metalist 1925 Kharkiv	Poltava
12:00		Report	Maryna Shainyuk 5'; Yelyzaveta Molodyuk 17', 39'; Yuliya Shevchuk 49'; Lidiya Zaborovets 58'	Stadium: Molodizhnyi; Referee: Lyudmyla Telbukh

=== Finals ===
27 May 2026
16:00

Metalist 1925 Kharkiv (I)	1 – 0	(I) Kolos Kovalivka
Lidiya Zaborovets 25'	Report

imeni Bannikova, Kyiv
Attendance: 198
Referee: Veronika Vasylchenko (Donetsk Oblast)

== See also ==
- 2025–26 Ukrainian Women's League
- 2025–26 Ukrainian Cup
