= Valentyna Tarakanova =

Ukrainian footballer

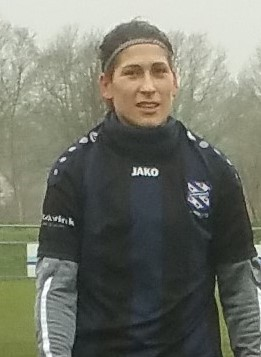
- 25 January 2020

Personal information
- Date of birth: 28 May 1996 (age 30)
- Position: Forward

Team information
- Current team: Polissya Zhytomyr

Senior career*
| Years | Team | Apps | (Gls) |
| 2016–2018 | Zlagoda-Dnipro-1 | 26 | (15) |
| 2018–2020 | Stomilanki Olsztyn | 35 | (43) |
| 2020–2021 | AP Orlen Gdańsk | 20 | (1) |
| 2022–2024 | Zlagoda-Dnipro-1 | 38 | (14) |
| 2024– | Polissya Zhytomyr | 9 | (0) |

International career^{‡}
| 2019– | Ukraine | 5 | (0) |
- * Club domestic league appearances and goals as of 27 November 2024 ‡ National team caps and goals as of 10 March 2020

Valentyna Tarakanova (born 28 May 1996) is a Ukrainian footballer who plays as forward for Polissya Zhytomyr and the Ukraine women's national team.
