= Kateryna Samson =

Ukrainian footballer (born 1988)

Kateryna Samson Катерина Самсон (Ukrainian)
Personal information
- Full name: Kateryna Yuriyivna Samson
- Date of birth: 5 July 1988 (age 38)
- Place of birth: Sumy, Soviet Union
- Height: 1.72 m (5 ft 8 in)
- Position: Goalkeeper

Team information
- Current team: Seasters Odesa
- Number: 28

Senior career*
Years	Team	Apps	(Gls)
2005–2007	Naftokhimik Kalush	45	(0)
2008–2011	Lehenda Chernihiv	41	(0)
2012–2014	Zvezda Perm	24	(0)
2015–2018	Ryazan	57	(0)
2019–2021	Zhytlobud-2 Kharkiv	27	(0)
2022	Győr	1	(0)
2022–2025	Vorskla Poltava	59	(0)
2026–	Seasters Odesa	1	(0)

International career^{‡}
	Ukraine U-19	18	(0)
2014–	Ukraine	56	(0)
- * Club domestic league appearances and goals as of 13 March 2026 ‡ National team caps and goals as of 19 February 2026

Kateryna Yuriyivna Samson (Ukrainian: Катерина Юріївна Самсон; born 5 July 1988) is a Ukrainian footballer who plays as a goalkeeper for Ukrainian club Seasters Odesa and the Ukraine women's national team. She previously played in the Ukrainian League for Naftokhimik Kalush and Lehenda Chernihiv, and in the Champions League with Lehenda Chernihiv. She was a member of the Ukrainian national team and took part in the 2009 European Championship.

On 5 February 2026, Samson joined Seasters Odesa. On 11 March 2026, she debuted for Seasters in a 5–0 home win over Polissya Zhytomyr in the Ukrainian Women's Top League.
