= FC Chornomorets Odesa (women) =

Ukrainian women's association football club

Chornomorets Odesa
- Full name: Women's Football Club; Chornomorets Odesa
- Short name: WFCCO
- Founded: 2021
- Ground: Complex "Lyustdorf", Lustdorf "Arkhitektorska" Training Base, Odesa
- Capacity: 500; 0
- Head coach: Victoria Samar
- League: Ukrainian Women's First League
- Website: chornomorets.ua (women)

Women's Football Club Chornomorets Odesa (Ukrainian: Жіно́чий Футбо́льний Клуб Чорномо́рець Оде́са) is the women's football team of the Ukrainian professional football club Chornomorets Odesa. It competes in the Ukrainian Women's First League, the third flight of women's football in Ukraine, and plays its home matches in Lustdorf.

== History ==
After the executive committee of the Ukrainian Association of Football mandated that all men's UPL clubs must include a women's team in their structure, the Odesa-based football club Chornomorets announced the creation of a women's section in June 2021. The newly formed women's team made its debut in the Ukrainian First League championship, competing in Group B during the 2021–2022 season.

On 16 August 2021, WFC Chornomorets played its debut official match in Mykolaiv against the local team Nika. The Odesa team managed to score a goal in the very first minute of the game, and the final score was 4–0 in favor of the Odesa side. After 10 rounds, Chornomorets had 11 points and sat in 6th place in the standings, but the season was not completed due to the Russian invasion. The team did not participate in national competitions in the following seasons and only resumed play in the 2026–27 season.

== Managers ==
- (Ukraine) Oksana Makarova (2021)
- (Ukraine) Oleksandr Spitsyn (2021)
- (Ukraine) Yevhen Dodurych (2022)
- (Ukraine) Victoria Samar (2026 – present)
