= Anatoliy Didenko =

Ukrainian footballer (born 1982)

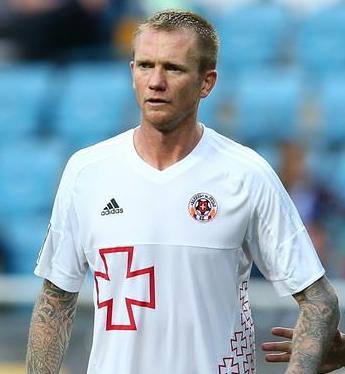
- Didenko in 2015

Personal information
- Full name: Anatoliy Oleksandrovych Didenko
- Date of birth: 9 June 1982 (age 44)
- Place of birth: Mykolaiv, Ukrainian SSR, Soviet Union
- Height: 1.93 m (6 ft 4 in)
- Position: Forward

Team information
- Current team: Chornomorets Odesa U19

Youth career
- 1998–1999: Mykolaiv

Senior career*
Years	Team	Apps	(Gls)
2000–2003	Mykolaiv	35	(1)
2001–2002	→ Olimpia Yuzhnoukrainsk (loan)	5	(0)
2003–2006	Amkar Perm	51	(1)
2006–2009	Metalist Kharkiv	37	(4)
2007	→ Zakarpattia Uzhhorod (loan)	9	(1)
2008	→ Zorya Luhansk (loan)	11	(1)
2009–2015	Chornomorets Odesa	151	(25)
2015–2017	Volyn Lutsk	34	(8)
2017	Zhemchuzhyna Odesa	17	(7)
2018	Mariupol	7	(1)
2018	Chornomorets Odesa	7	(0)
Total		364	(49)

Managerial career
- 2020–2021: Mykolaiv (assistant)
- 2021–2024: Chornomorets Odesa U19
- 2025: Chornomorets-2 Odesa
- 2026–: Seasters
- * Club domestic league appearances and goals

Anatoliy Didenko (Ukrainian: Анатолій Олександрович Діденко; born 9 June 1982) is a Ukrainian former professional footballer and football manager.

== Club career ==
Didenko is Gold medalist of the 2003 Russian First Division, semi-finalist (2006–07, 2013–14) and finalist of the Ukrainian Cup (2012–13), bronze medalist of the Ukrainian Championship (2006–07), and the best scorer of Chornomorets Odesa in the 2010–11 season.

== Managerial career ==
Didenko has been the head coach of Chornomorets-2 Odesa since the 2025–26 season. On 8 January 2026, Anatoliy Didenko has left the club. Next day Didenko became the head coach of FC Seasters.
