= Denys Kolchin =

Ukrainian footballer

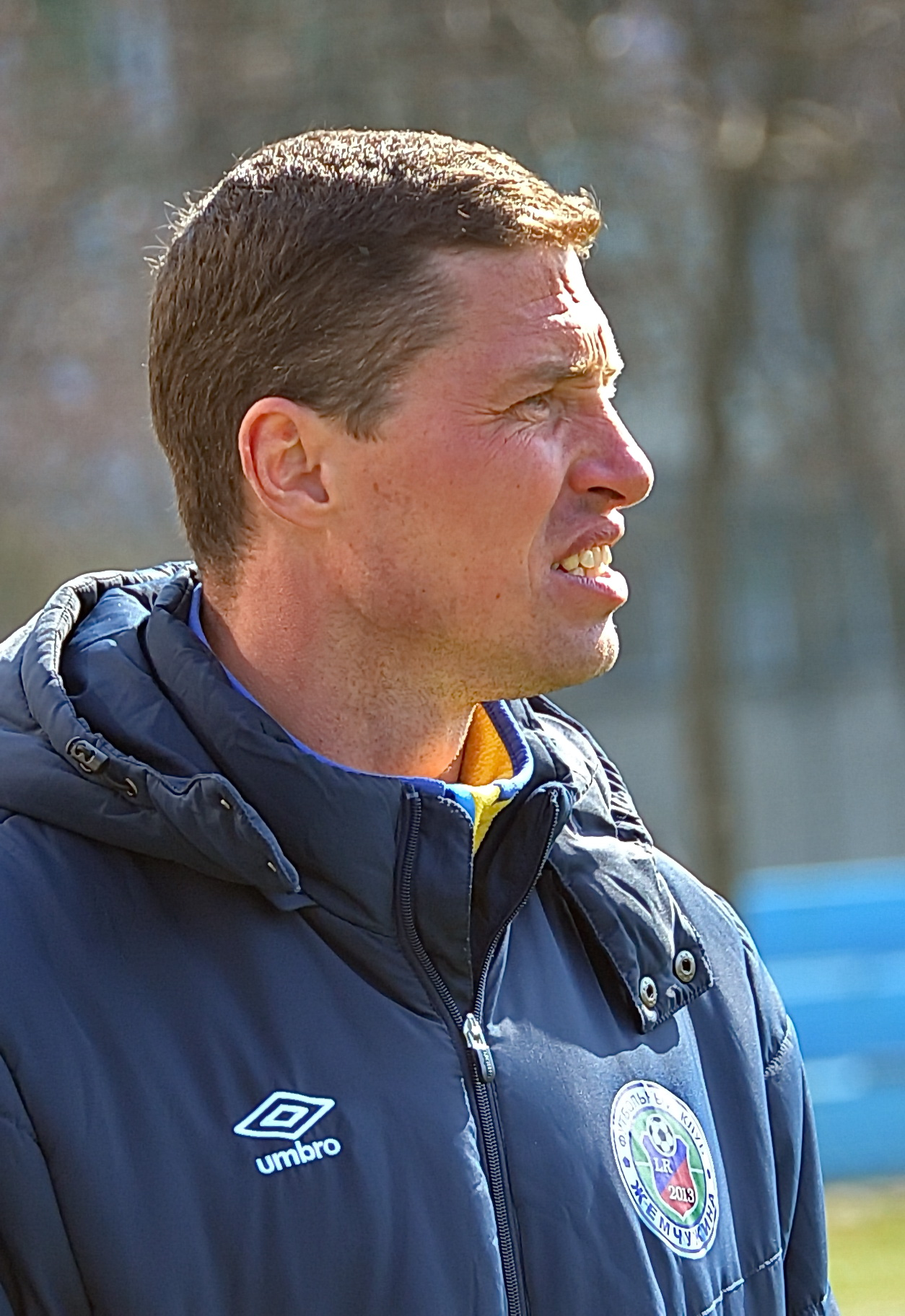

Personal information
- Full name: Denys Borysovych Kolchin
- Date of birth: 13 October 1977 (age 49)
- Place of birth: Odesa, Ukrainian SSR
- Height: 1.90 m (6 ft 3 in)
- Position: Defender

Team information
- Current team: Chornomorets-2 Odesa (manager)

Youth career
- ????–1993: Chornomorets (sports school)

Senior career*
Years	Team	Apps	(Gls)
1995–1998	Chornomorets Odesa	66	(0)
1993–1994	→Chornomorets-2 Odesa	32	(0)
1998–2000	Kryvbas Kryvyi Rih	20	(0)
2000	→Kryvbas-2 Kryvyi Rih	4	(1)
2003–2004	Chornomorets Odesa	12	(1)
2003–2004	→Chornomorets-2 Odesa	8	(0)
2005	Kryvbas Kryvyi Rih	11	(0)
2006–2007	Mykolaiv	18	(0)
2007	Mashuk-KMV Pyatigorsk	13	(1)
2008	Dnister Ovidiopol	23	(0)
Total		207	(3)

International career
1994	Ukraine U16	?	(?)
1996–1998	Ukraine U21	6	(0)

Managerial career
- 2010–2014: Chornomorets sports school (coach)
- 2014–2017: Zhemchuzhyna Odesa
- 2017–2018: Nyva Vinnytsia
- 2020–2023: Balkany Zorya
- 2025: SeaSters
- 2026–: Chornomorets-2 Odesa
Medal record
Men's football
Representing Ukraine
UEFA European Under-16 Championship
Third place	1994 Republic of Ireland
- * Club domestic league appearances and goals

Denys Kolchin (Ukrainian: Денис Колчін; born 13 October 1977) is a Ukrainian former professional footballer and current manager of Chornomorets-2 Odesa. He won bronze medal of the 1994 UEFA European Under-16 Championship as member of the Ukraine national under-17 football team.

== Career ==
He last played for FC Dnister Ovidiopol and later worked as a coach of another club in the Black Sea region Zhemchuzhyna Odesa.

== Managerial career ==
In the summer of 2025 Kolchin headed the SeaSters. On 27 December 2025, he left the club.

On 16 January 2026, Kolchin was appointed as the manager of Chornomorets-2 Odesa. It is noted that the specialist will also become the club's deputy general director for youth and youth football development.

== Honours ==
=== Individual ===
- Ukrainian Second League best coach: 2016–17

== See also ==
- 1994 UEFA European Under-16 Championship
- 1994 UEFA European Under-16 Championship squads
