= FC Kolos Kovalivka (women) =

Kolos Kovalivka
- Full name: FC Kolos Kovalivka
- Founded: 2020
- Ground: Kolos Stadium
- President: Andriy Zasukha
- Manager: Lyudmyla Pokotylo
- League: Ukrainian Women's League
- 2024–25: 3rd
- Website: https://koloskovalivka.com/

Kolos Kovalivka is a Ukrainian women's football team from Kovalivka, part of FC Kolos Kovalivka.

== History ==
The women's team of Kolos Kovalivka was created in 2020 based on the Sports Club Vyshneve from the city of Vyshneve near Kyiv. The team was adopted by Kolos during the winter break of the 2019–20 season while playing in the 2nd tier (Persha Liha) and previously being named Invictus Kyiv. Since the establishment of SC Vyshneve, the team has been coached by Lyudmyla Pokotylo, who as a footballer played for the former Nyva Baryshivka in the Soviet Women's League.

In 2020–21, the team became champions of the Persha Liha and were promoted to the Vyshcha Liha of the Ukrainian Women's League. In 2022, Kolos reached the finals of the Women's Cup but were defeated by Vorskla Poltava. Following the end of the 2023–24 season, Kolos finished second and qualified for European competitions for the first time.

On 4 September 2024, Kolos made their debut in European competitions. Competing in the 2024–25 UEFA Women's Champions League, they were eliminated in the qualifications.

== Honorous ==
- Vyshcha Liha (tier 1)
  - Runner-up (1): 2023–24
- Persha Liha (tier 2)
  - Winners (1): 2020–21
- Ukrainian Cup
  - Runner-up (2): 2021–22, 2025–26

== European History ==
In European competitions, the club debuted in 2024 with a game against Dutch Ajax. The first goal for Kolos was scored by Violeta Tian.

Season	Competition	Stage	Result	Opponent
2023–24	UEFA Women's Champions League	Qualifying Round 1	1–4 (neutral)	(Netherlands) Ajax
2023–24	UEFA Women's Champions League	Qualifying Round 1	1–2 (away)	(Denmark) Brøndby
2025–26	UEFA Women's Europa Cup	Qualifying Round 1	0–2 (away)	(Albania) Vllaznia
2025–26	UEFA Women's Europa Cup	Qualifying Round 1	0–2 (away)	(Albania) Vllaznia
2025–26	UEFA Women's Europa Cup	Qualifying Round 1		(Portugal) Torreense
