= Ukrainian Women's Prime League =

- Founded: 2026
- Country: Ukraine
- Confederation: UEFA
- Number of clubs: 8
- Relegation to: Ukrainian Women's Higher League
- Domestic cup: Ukrainian Women's Cup
- International cup: Champions League
- Current champions: Metalist 1925 Kharkiv (2025–26)
- Broadcaster(s): Megogo
- Website: Ukrainian Women's Prime League
- Current: 2026–27 Ukrainian Women's Prime League

The Women's Football Prime League is an annual competition for Ukrainian women's football clubs; held since 2026, it is the top-tier tournament in Ukrainian women's football and determines the national champion.

== History ==
The Ukrainian women's football championship was established in 1992 and divided into two divisions: the Higher League and the First League. Prior to the creation of the Prime League in the 2026/27 season, the national champion was determined annually based on results in the Higher League.

In July 2026, the All-Ukrainian Women's Football Association officially unveiled the Prime League — a new elite division of the Ukrainian women's club championship.

Eight clubs qualified for the inaugural season of the Prime League after successfully completing the licensing process and meeting the requirements for the elite division. The tournament's final results will determine the national champion and the participants in European competitions for the following season.
