= Yana Kalinina =

Ukrainian footballer

Personal information
- Full name: Yana Mykolaivna Kalinina
- Date of birth: 14 November 1994 (age 31)
- Place of birth: Okhtyrka, Ukraine
- Position: Forward

Team information
- Current team: Seasters Odesa
- Number: 10

Senior career*
Years	Team	Apps	(Gls)
2012–2022	Zhytlobud-2/Vorskla Poltava		
2022	Olimpia Szczecin	7	(2)
2022–2025	Vorskla Poltava		
2026–	Seasters Odesa	13	(11)

International career^{‡}
2012–2013	Ukraine U19	6	(3)
2016–	Ukraine	81	(10)
- * Club domestic league appearances and goals as of 26 August 2026 ‡ National team caps and goals as of 3 March 2026

Yana Mykolaivna Kalinina (Ukrainian: Яна Миколаївна Калініна, born 14 November 1994) is a Ukrainian footballer who plays as a forward for Seasters Odesa in the Ukrainian Women's Top League, where she is the all-time record league goalscorer. She is the first player to have hit 200 goals in the league, and holds the record for most goals in a single league season.

Kalinina has won five league titles and five Cups with Vorskla. She is four-time top-scorer in the league, in 2014, 2019–20, 2020–21 and 2022-23.

== Club career ==
Born in Okhtyrka, Sumy Oblast, Yana Kalinina got into professional sport by accident, when a friend asked her to play for her village football team, was spotted by selectors of the regional Sumy representative side, and then playing for them by Yevhen Pohorielov, coach of Ukrainian Women's League side Zhytlobud-2 Kharkiv (now Vorskla Poltava). Pohorielov invited her to Kharkhiv for a trial, after which she was offered a contract with the club.

Kalinina made her debut in the top league as a 17-year-old for the 2012 season, where Zhytlobuda-2 finished sixth. The following year, she scored ten goals as the club finished in fifth place.

Her goals propelled Zhytlobud-2 into a title race for the first time, against neighbours Zhytlobud-1 (now Metalist 1925 Kharkiv). Going into the final day of the 2014 season unbeaten and level on points with their neighbours but 25 goals behind on goal difference, Kalinina scored seven as Zhytlobud-2 beat second-from-bottom Ateks 15-0. They were denied the title as Zhytlobud-1 won their final match against Illichivka. Kalinina's final day haul saw her finish top of the goalscoring charts for the first time, scoring 15 goals.

This prompted Kalinina to be awarded the honorary title of "Master of Sports of Ukraine" in December 2014, and showed her prowess once more in being top scorer in the Ukrainian Winter Championship, held in early 2015 in Uman.

Zhytlobud-2 continued to improve and after finishing third, three points off the title in 2015, they finally achieved league glory in 2016 and 2017, the latter being the final Ukrainian women's league season run off from start to finish in the same calendar year.

Kalinina scored her 100th professional goal on 23 September 2018 against Panthers, joining the Ukrainian goalscoring hall of fame named after Svitlana Frishko. Despite scoring 27 goals in the 2017-18 season and 22 goals the following campaign, she was beaten to the Golden Boot for top scorer both seasons by her subsequent Ukraine international team-mate Olga Ovdiychuk, who scored 28 and 30 goals respectively.

In the title-winning 2019-2020 campaign, she once again became league top scorer with 17 goals, retaining her personal crown the following season with a haul of 22 as Zhytlobud-2 were dethroned as champions.

They were on course to regain their title in 2021-22 season, when the season was abandoned early without champions being crowned due to the Russian invasion of Ukraine. Ukrainian-based players were allowed out of their contracts and to play abroad during this period, with Kalinina moving to Poland to play for Olimpia Szczecin in the Ekstraliga.

Returning home after six months, Kalinina rejoined her original club, who by this stage had relocated from Kharkiv to Poltava, being renamed Vorskla Poltava. For the new 2022-23 season, she struck a record 39 goals in a single season to be league top scorer for a third season-in-a-row as Vorskla did the league and Cup double.

Kalinin's hat-trick against Dnipro-1 on 1 September 2023 saw her become the first player to hit 200 league goals in the history of the Ukrainian Women's Championship. She ended the season doing the double with Vorskla again in 2024, their Cup success being their fifth in a row.

On 15 February 2026, Kalinina joined Seasters Odesa. On 11 March 2026, she debuted for Seasters in a 5–0 home win over Polissya Zhytomyr in the Ukrainian Women's Top League and scored twice.

== International career ==
Kalinina's first call-up to the Ukraine was for Euro 2017 qualifiers against Romania and France, but never came off the bench for either game. Her debut came against Israel on 21 January 2016 in a friendly, coming on for Tetyana Kozyrenko at half-time.

She scored her first goal for the national team on 8 March 2016 in a Euro 2017 qualifier against Greece.

Kalinina helped Ukraine to the play-offs for Euro 2025, but lost in the play-off final to Belgium.

Kalinina scored Ukraine's only goal in their opening game of the 2027 FIFA Women's World Cup qualification campaign, a 1–6 loss against England on 3 March 2026.

== Honours ==
Zhytlobud-2/Vorskla Poltava

- Ukrainian Women's Top League: 2014, 2019–20, 2022–23, 2023–24
- Ukrainian Women's Cup: 2020, 2021, 2022, 2023, 2024

Individual

- Ukrainian Women's Top League top scorer: 2014, 2019–20, 2022–23, 2023–24
