= SC Ladomyr Volodymyr =

SC Ladomyr
- Full name: SC Ladomyr Volodymyr
- Founded: 2012 (as a football section of the Volodymyr-Volynskyi specialized boarding school); 2017 SC Ladomyr
- Ground: Stadion "Olimp", Volodymyr, Volyn Oblast
- Chairman: Mykola Stetsyuk
- Manager: Oleh Bortnik
- League: Ukrainian Women's League
- 2024–25: 6th

SC Ladomyr is a Ukrainian professional sports club out of the city of Volodymyr, which has women's football and futsal teams.

== History ==
The club was founded in 2012 based on the football section of the Volodymyr lyceum "The center for education and social-pedagogical support" (formerly the Volodymyr-Volynskyi specialized boarding school). While playing in the second tier (Persha Liha) in 2017, the football section was transformed into a separate entity known now as SC Ladomyr.

== Honours ==
- Ukrainian Women's League: Persha Liha
  - Winner: 2017
- Ukrainian Futsal Championship
  - Winner: 2022–23

== Head coaches ==
- 2012–2014 Dmytro Katkov
- 2014–present Oleh Bornik
