= WFC Lider Kobeliaky =

Women's association football club based in Kobeliaky, Ukraine

Lider Kobeliaky
- Full name: Lider Kobeliaky
- Founded: 2002
- Stadium: Kremin Arena, Kremenchuk
- Capacity: 1,566
- Coach: (Ukraine) Ruslan Sabirov
- League: Ukrainian Women's First League
- 2022–23: 1 (champions)

Lider Kobeliaky (Ukrainian: ЖФК Лідер Кобеляки), are a Ukrainian women's football and futsal club based in Kobeliaky. Founded in 2002, they compete in the Ukrainian Women's First League, the second flight of women's football in Ukraine, and plays their home games at the Kremin Arena in Kremenchuk.

== History ==
=== Lider-ZPO ===
Lider was founded in 2022 under the name Lider-ZPO, where ZPO stands for the Poltava Oblast football team. It participated in futsal competitions. Its players came from Kobeliaky and Hrebinka sports schools.

Lider finished the 2020–21 futsal season in tenth place.

=== Women's football, 2022–present ===
Lider decided to participate in Ukrainian Women's First League in 2022. Ruslan Sabirov was chosen as coach. Most of the players came from FC Vorskla Poltava.

Club also participated in Ukrainian Women's Futsal Championship, where it finished third. They also won their first ever medals in Futlas Vyshcha Liha.

Lider won the First League in their first year, giving them a promotion to Vyshcha Liha. Anhelina Fedorenko became the top scorer in the league. Since the club did not find players who would strengthen the team, it was decided to remain in the First League.

== Honours ==
- First League (second tier)
  - Winners (1): 2022–23
