= Yunist ShVSM Chernihiv =

Ukrainian women's association football club

- Full name: Women's Football Club Yunist ShVSM Chernihiv
- Founded: 2020
- Ground: Yunist Stadium, Chernihiv
- Capacity: 3000
- Manager: Liudmyla Shmatko
- League: First League Top
Home colours	Away colours

Yunist ShVSM Chernihiv (Ukrainian: "Юність-ШВСМ" Чернігів) is a Ukrainian women's football club from Chernihiv, Ukraine established in 2020.

ShVSM abbreviation stands for School of Higher Sports Mastery (Ukrainian: Школа Вищої Спортивної Майстерності).

== History ==
=== Origin ===
The team was found as a temporary solution in 2020 in Chernihiv as the Chernihiv Oblast was left without a women's team for the first time since 1992. The new club was formed based on a local sports school Yunist Chernihiv and a women's club Yednist-ShVSM Plysky and since 2020 is playing in the First League, the second tier (amateur level) of the woman football competitions in Ukraine. The club intends to join the FC Desna Chernihiv as its women's section for the 2021–22 season when all women's clubs will be merged with men's club.

=== Roots from Spartak Chernihiv ===
In 2021, the new club takes its roots from a women's football team Spartak ShVSM Chernihiv that first entered the 2015 First League competition and in 2016, after receiving a promotion to the top tier of the Ukrainian Women's League for the 2017 season. In 2017 the football team moved to Plysky to the already existing FC Yednist Plysky and was adopted as the women's team of Yednist Plysky. In 2018 Lehenda-ShVSM Chernihiv spilt, with Lehenda Chernihiv becoming defunct, while ShVSM merging with the Yednist women's team and forming Yednist-ShVSM Plysky. The Lehenda's chairman Volodymyr Maherramov became a chairman of Yednist-ShVSM. In June 2020 Yednist-ShVSM Plysky informed the Ukrainian Association of Football that it ends its participations in competitions. Once again, ShVSM split away and formed a new team based on the Yunist sports school in Chernihiv as Yunist-ShVSM Chernihiv.

=== Recently Time ===
Recently the team is playing in Ukrainian First league in the season 2021–22.

== Stadium & Facilities ==
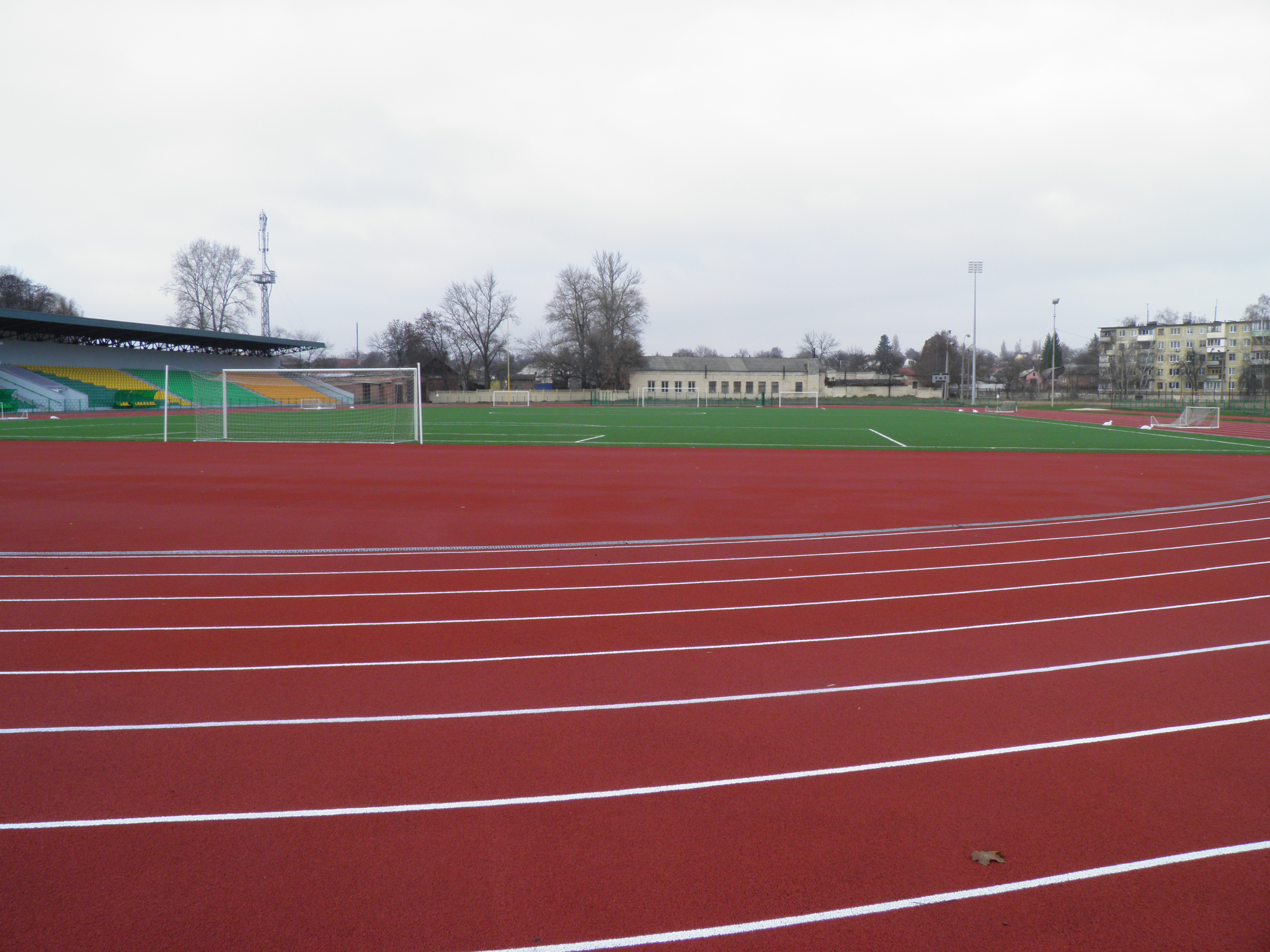
Yunist Stadium in Chernihiv

The Team plays in Yunist Stadium in Victory Ave, 110 Chernihiv, Ukraine.In 2017, work on the reconstruction of the new stadium began. For the reconstruction of the Yunist Stadium cost 55 million hryvnias in 2019.

== League and cup history ==
Season	Div.	Pos.	Pl.	W	D	L	GS	GA	P	Domestic Cup	Europe	Notes
2017–18	1st	5	18	9	2	7	39	35	29			
2018–19	1st	5	18	8	0	10	32	17	24			Withdrew

== Managers ==
Spartak Chernihiv (2015 – 2017)

Yednist-ShVSM Plysky (2017 – 2020)

- 2018 Roman Zayev
- 2019 Volodymyr Kulyk
- 2019 Oleksandr Babor
- 2020 Maksym Rakhayev
- 2020–2021 Natalia Hryhorivna
- 2022 Liudmyla Shmatko

== See also ==
- Yunist Chernihiv
- FC Yednist' Plysky
- Lehenda Chernihiv
- FC Desna Chernihiv
- FC Desna-2 Chernihiv
- FC Desna-3 Chernihiv
- SDYuShOR Desna
- FC Chernihiv
- Spartak Chernihiv
