= 1992 Ukrainian Women's League =

Ukrainian Women's League
- Season: 1992
- Champions: Dynamo Kyiv
- Relegated: none

The 1992 season of the Ukrainian Championship was the 1st season of Ukraine's women's football competitions. The championship was formed out of Soviet football clubs based in Ukraine. The newly formed championship ran from 18 April 1992 to 3 October 1992.

The championship was organized in two tiers with total of 18 teams. The competition was joined by 13 out of 19 Soviet teams from Ukraine that previous season competed in the Soviet championship.

== Teams ==
Locations of teams in the 1992 Ukrainian Championship Higher League
Locations of teams in the 1992 Ukrainian Championship First League

=== Higher League team qualification ===
Team	League and position in 1991	
Lehenda Chernihiv	Soviet Top (Group 1)	6
Nyva-Olimp Kyiv	Soviet Top (Group 1)	8
Arena Kyiv	Soviet Top (Group 2)	1
Dnipro Dnipropetrovsk	Soviet Top (Group 2)	4
Luhanochka Luhansk	Soviet Top (Group 2)	8
Dynamo Kyiv	Soviet Top (Group 2)	9
Krym-Yuni Simferopol	Soviet First (Group 1)	2
Bukovynka Chernivtsi	Soviet First (Group 1)	3
Chornomorochka Odesa	Soviet First (Group 1)	4
Borysfen Zaporizhia	Soviet First (Group 2)	2

=== First League team qualification ===
Team	League and position in 1991	
Radosyn Kyiv	Soviet First (Group 2)	6
Iunisa Luhansk	Soviet Second (Group 3)	3
Mria Kirovohrad	Soviet Second (Group 3)	4
Olimp-2 Kyiv	Reserves	N/A
Lvivianka Lviv	Republican	N/A
Tavria Kherson	Republican	N/A
Tekstylnyk Donetsk	Republican	N/A
Iskra Zaporizhia	Republican	N/A

=== Other teams that withdrew ===
Team	League and position in 1991	
Svitlana Dnipropetrovsk	Soviet First (Group 1)	5
ZDU Zaporizhia	Soviet First (Group 2)	4
Debiut-88 Kharkiv	Soviet First (Group 3)	8
Atlanta Sevastopol	Soviet Second (Group 2)	6
Azovchanka Mariupol	Soviet Second (Group 3)	5
Soiuz Kharkiv	Soviet Second (Group 3)	6

== Higher League ==
=== League table ===
Pos	Team	Pld	W	D	L	GF	GA	GD	Pts	Qualification or relegation
1	Dynamo Kyiv	18	16	2	0	54	6	+48	34	Champions
2	Arena-Hospodar Kyiv	18	9	6	3	26	14	+12	24	
3	Lehenda Chernihiv	18	8	5	5	26	21	+5	21	
4	Olimp Kyiv	18	7	5	6	26	18	+8	19	
5	Bukovynka Chernivtsi	18	5	9	4	19	15	+4	19	Withdrew after the season
6	Luhanochka Luhansk	18	8	2	8	17	25	−8	18	
7	Borysfen Zaporizhia	18	4	9	5	13	19	−6	17	
8	Dnipro Dnipropetrovsk	18	5	2	11	19	34	−15	12	
9	Krym-Yuni Simferopol	18	2	6	10	14	34	−20	10	
10	Chornomorochka Odesa	18	0	6	12	6	34	−28	6	Qualification to relegation play-offs

Source: WFPL.ua, Womensfootball.ua

=== Results ===
Home \ Away	ARE	BOR	BUK	CHO	DNI	DYN	KRY	LHD	LUH	OLP
Arena-Hospodar Kyiv	—	2–0	1–1	2–0	2–0	0–2	1–1	1–0	4–0	2–0
Borysfen Zaporizhia	2–2	—	0–0	0–0	0–3	1–1	2–0	1–1	1–2	1–0
Bukovynka Chernivtsi	3–3	0–0	—	2–0	2–0	1–2	4–1	0–0	0–1	1–1
Chornomorochka Odesa	0–2	1–1	0–2	—	1–1	0–4	0–0	1–2	2–2	0–2
Dnipro Dnipropetrovsk	0–1	0–0	3–0*	2–1	—	0–7	4–1	1–3	1–2	1–2
Dynamo Kyiv	2–0	4–1	2–0	0–0	1–0	—	9–1	4–1	4–0	4–1
Krym-Yuni Simferopol	1–1	0–1	0–0	1–0	1–2	0–2	—	2–2	3–0	1–1
Lehenda Chernihiv	1–1	0–1	1–1	4–0	3–0*	0–2	2–1	—	1–0	2–0
Luhanochka Luhansk	1–0	2–0	0–2	3–0*	2–1	0–1	1–0	1–2	—	0–3
Olimp Kyiv	0–1	1–1	0–0	4–0	5–0	0–3	2–0	4–1	0–0	—

Source: WFPL.UA
Legend: Blue = home team win; Yellow = draw; Red = away team win.

=== Top scorers ===
Rank	Player	Club	Goals
1	(Ukraine) Svitlana Frishko	Dynamo Kyiv	21

== First League ==
=== League table ===
Pos	Team	Pld	W	D	L	GF	GA	GD	Pts	Qualification or relegation
1	Iskra Zaporizhia	14	11	3	0	34	2	+32	25	Promoted to Higher League
2	Tekstylnyk Donetsk	14	11	2	1	37	6	+31	24	Promoted to Higher League
3	Iunisa Luhansk	14	6	4	4	28	17	+11	16	Promoted to Higher League
4	Radosyn Kyiv	14	5	6	3	16	12	+4	16	Promoted to Higher League
5	Mria Kirovohrad	14	5	3	6	11	33	−22	13	
6	Lvivianka	14	3	2	9	8	23	−15	8	
7	Tavria Kherson	14	2	3	9	9	40	−31	7	
8	Olimp-2 Kyiv	14	1	1	12	3	13	−10	3	Withdrew

Source: WFPL.ua, Womensfootball.ua

== See also ==
- 1992 Ukrainian Women's Cup
