= Iryna Vasylyuk =

Ukrainian footballer (born 1985)

Personal information
- Full name: Iryna Vasylivna Vasylyuk
- Date of birth: 18 May 1985 (age 41)
- Place of birth: Soviet Union
- Height: 1.71 m (5 ft 7 in)
- Position: Defender

Team information
- Current team: Obolon Kyiv

Senior career*
Years	Team	Apps	(Gls)
2001	Kyivska Rus Kyiv	6	(0)
2002	Volyn Lutsk	3	(0)
2003	WFC Kharkiv	3	(0)
2003	Luhanochka Luhansk	5	(0)
2004	Metalist Kharkiv	13	(2)
2008	Energiya Voronezh	?	(?)
2009	Illichivka Mariupol	5	(2)
2009–2012	Medyk Konin	?	(?)
2012–2014	Mordovochka Saransk	32	(3)
2015	Ryazan-VDV	20	(0)
2016–2018	Zhytlobud-2 Kharkiv	37	(8)
2021–2022	DYuSSh-26 Kyiv	10	(1)
2022	WFC Mariupol	13	(2)
2023–	Obolon Kyiv	6	(5)

International career
2004–2018	Ukraine	65	(0)
- * Club domestic league appearances and goals

Irina Vasylyuk (Ukrainian: Ірина Василівна Василюк; born 18 May 1985) is a Ukrainian footballer who plays as a defender for Obolon Kyiv.

She previously played for several sides in the Ukrainian League including Metalist Kharkiv with whom she played the 2004-05 UEFA Women's Cup, Energiya Voronezh in Russia and Medyk Konin in the Polish Ekstraliga.

She has been a member of the Ukraine national team since 2004, and took part in the 2009 European Championship. Vasylyuk made her debut on 28 April 2004 in a 0–6 away loss to Germany. On 10 December 2018, Vasylyuk announced her retirement from the national team on her Facebook page. In total, she earned 65 caps for Ukraine.
