= 1993 Ukrainian Women's Cup =

Tournament details
- Country: Ukraine

Final positions
- Champions: Arena-Hospodar Kyiv
- Runners-up: Dynamo Kyiv

The 1993 Ukrainian Women's Cup was the 2nd season of Ukrainian knockout competitions among women teams.

== Participated clubs ==
- Crimea: Krym-Iuni Simferopol
- Chernihiv Oblast: Lehenda Chernihiv
- Dnipropetrovsk Oblast: Dnipro Dnipropetrovsk
- Donetsk Oblast: Tekstylshchyk Donetsk
- Kharkiv Oblast: Soyuz Kharkiv
- Kirovohrad Oblast: Mriya Kirovohrad
- Kyiv (4): Tornado, Dynamo, Arena, Alina
- Luhansk Oblast (3): Luhanochka Luhansk, Unisa Luhansk, Kontek Luhansk
- Lviv Oblast: Lvivianka Lviv
- Mykolaiv Oblast: Lada Mykolaiv
- Zaporizhia Oblast (3): Iskra Zaporizhia, Borysfen Zaporizhia, Stymul Zaporizhia

== Competition schedule ==
=== First round ===
Matches of the first leg took place on 21 April 1993, the second leg - 28 April 1993.

Team 1	Agg.	Team 2	1st leg	2nd leg
Lada Mykolaiv	0–4	Stymul Zaporizhia	0–2	0–2
Kontek Luhansk	0–21	Luhanochka Luhansk	0–17	0–4

=== Round of 16 ===
Matches of the first leg took place on 3-5 May 1993, the second leg - 20 May-10 June 1993.

Team 1	Agg.	Team 2	1st leg	2nd leg
Arena Kyiv	w/o	Soyuz Kharkiv	+/- (TR)	+/- (TR)
Iskra Zaporizhia	w/o	Mriya Kirovohrad	+/- (TR)	+/- (TR)
Borysfen Zaporizhia	w/o	Lehenda Chernihiv	0–2	-/+ (TR)
Unisa Luhansk	2–1	Luhanochka Luhansk	1–0	1–1
Tekstylnyk Donetsk	w/o	Dnipro Dnipropetrovsk	1–2	-/+ (TR)
Dynamo Kyiv	6–0	Krym-Iuni Simferopol	4–0	2–0
Tornado Kyiv	5–0	Stymul Zaporizhia	2–0	3–0
Lvivianka Lviv	3–3 (2–3 p)	Alina Kyiv	2–1	1–2 (a.e.t.)

=== Quarterfinals ===
Matches of the first leg took place on 10-24 June 1993, the second leg - 24 June-7 July 1993.

Team 1	Agg.	Team 2	1st leg	2nd leg
Arena Kyiv	2–1	Lehenda Chernihiv	2–0	0–1
Tornado Kyiv	1–2	Unisa Luhansk	0–2	1–0
Iskra Zaporizhia	10–1	Alina Kyiv	5–1	5–0
Dnipro Dnipropetrovsk	w/o	Dynamo Kyiv	-/+ (TR)	-/+ (TR)

=== Semifinals ===
Matches of the first leg took place on 7-14 July 1993, the second leg - 21 July 1993.

Team 1	Agg.	Team 2	1st leg	2nd leg
Arena Kyiv	4–4 (a)	Unisa Luhansk	3–0	1–4
Iskra Zaporizhia	w/o	Dynamo Kyiv	0–2	-/+ (TR)

=== Final ===
Team 1	Score	Team 2
Arena Kyiv	4–1	Dynamo Kyiv

== See also ==
- 1993–94 Ukrainian Cup
- 1993 Ukrainian Women's League
