= 2001 Ukrainian Women's League =

Ukrainian Women's League
- Season: 2001
- Champions: Lehenda-Cheksil Chernihiv
- UEFA Women's Champions League: Lehenda-Cheksil Chernihiv

The 2001 season of the Ukrainian Championship was the 10th season of Ukraine's women's football competitions. The championship ran from 25 July to 28 September 2001.

As the previous season, the clubs were set in two groups with the top two from each contesting the title in championship round robin tournament.

== Teams ==
Locations of teams in the 2001 Ukrainian Championship Higher League

=== Team changes ===
Promoted	Relegated
Volyn Lutsk (debut); Luhanochka Luhansk (return)	Dynamo Irpin (dissolved); Mriya Kirovohrad (withdrew)

=== Name changes ===
- SKIF Lviv changed its name to Lvivianka Lviv.
- Luhanochka last competed in 1993

== First stage ==
=== Group West ===
Pos	Team	Pld	W	D	L	GF	GA	GD	Pts	Qualification or relegation
1	Lehenda-Cheksil Chernihiv	6	6	0	0	41	0	+41	18	Qualified for finals
2	Volyn Lutsk	6	2	1	3	14	24	−10	7	Qualified for finals
3	Kyivska Rus Kyiv	6	2	0	4	15	22	−7	6	
4	Lvivianka Lviv	6	1	1	4	11	35	−24	4	

Source: WFPL.ua

=== Group East ===
Pos	Team	Pld	W	D	L	GF	GA	GD	Pts	Qualification or relegation
1	Donchanka Donetsk	6	6	0	0	40	4	+36	18	Qualified for finals
2	Luhanochka Luhansk	6	4	0	2	14	22	−8	12	Qualified for finals
3	Iunist Poltava	6	2	0	4	15	23	−8	6	
4	Kharkivianka Kharkiv	6	0	0	6	7	27	−20	0	

Source: WFPL.ua

== Finals ==
Pos	Team	Pld	W	D	L	GF	GA	GD	Pts	Qualification or relegation
1	Donchanka Donetsk	3	2	1	0	16	2	+14	7	Gold match
2	Lehenda-Cheksil Chernihiv	3	2	1	0	13	2	+11	7	Gold match
3	Volyn Lutsk	3	0	1	2	1	12	−11	1	
4	Luhanochka Luhansk	3	0	1	2	1	15	−14	1	

Source: WFPL.ua

== Gold match ==
28 September 2001	Lehenda-Cheksil Chernihiv	5 – 0	Donchanka Donetsk	Kremenchuk, Poltava Oblast
14:00	Zhdanova 4'; Khodyreva 24', 37'; Ivanova 59', 69'			Stadium: Politekhnik; Attendance: 700
