= Iryna Vanat =

Ukrainian footballer (born 1971)

Personal information
- Full name: Iryna Ivanivna Vanat
- Date of birth: 8 May 1971 (age 55)
- Place of birth: Monastyryska, Ukrainian SSR

Senior career*
Years	Team	Apps	(Gls)
1988–1990	Nyva Baryshivka		
1991	Tekstilschik Ramenskoye		
1992	Arena-Hospodar Fastiv		
1993–1996	Czarni Sosnowiec		
1997	Donchanka		
1998	Halychanka Lviv		
- * Club domestic league appearances and goals

Iryna Vanat (Ukrainian: Ірина Іванівна Ванат; born May 8, 1971) is a Ukrainian and Soviet former professional footballer. She played for Nyva Baryshivka, Tekstilschik Ramenskoye, Arena-Hospodar Fastiv, Czarni Sosnowiec, Donchanka, and Halychanka Lviv. At Nyva and Tekstilschik, she won both editions of the Soviet women's football championship. At Czarni, she won two Polish Cups.

In the early 2010s, Vanat founded the Women's Football Association of the Lviv Oblast to develop and promote women's football in the region and improve conditions for players.

In 2020, Vanat ran for election to the Ternopil Oblast Council on the Power of the People party list. The party did not garner enough votes to win a seat on the council.

== Honours ==
Czarni Sosnowiec

- Polish Cup: 1994–95, 1995–96
