= Yulia Vashchenko =

Ukrainian footballer (born 1978)

Yulia Vaschenko
Personal information
- Full name: Yulia Vaschenko
- Date of birth: 31 January 1978 (age 48)
- Place of birth: Dnipropetrovsk, Soviet Union
- Position: Midfielder

Senior career*
Years	Team	Apps	(Gls)
1993	Dnipro Dnipropetrovsk	9	(0)
1994	Iskra Zaporozhye	13	(0)
1995–1998	Alina Kiev	35	(1)
1999–2001	Lehenda Chernihiv	22	(2)
2002	Donchanka	9	(2)
2003–2008	Zhytlobud Kharkiv	81	(29)
2009	Energiya Voronezh		
2010–2011	Lehenda Chernihiv	23	(2)
2012–	Naftokhimik Kalush		

International career
1996–2010	Ukraine		
- * Club domestic league appearances and goals

Yulia Vaschenko, (née Karpenkova), is a Ukrainian football midfielder currently playing for Naftokhimik Kalush in the Ukrainian League. She has also played the UEFA Champions League with Zhytlobud Kharkiv and Lehenda Chernihiv, making her debut in 2007 with the former.

She was a member of the Ukrainian national team for fourteen years since her debut in 1996, playing the 2009 European Championship.

== Honours ==
Lehenda Chernihiv

- Ukrainian Women's League (2) 2000, 2001
- Women's Cup (1) 2001
