= Tetyana Verezubova =

Ukrainian footballer

Personal information
- Full name: Tetyana Oleksandrivna Verezubova
- Date of birth: 8 June 1972 (age 54)
- Place of birth: Kyiv, Soviet Union
- Height: 1.62 m (5 ft 4 in)
- Position: Striker

Team information
- Current team: Obolon Kyiv

Senior career*
Years	Team	Apps	(Gls)
1988–1990	Arena Kyiv		
1991–1992	Olimp Kyiv		
1992–1994	Dynamo Kyiv		
1994	Alina Kyiv		
1995	Energiya Voronezh		
- Ryazan
2002–2003	Lada Togliatti		
2004–2006	Rossiyanka		

International career
1988–1991	Soviet Union		
1992–2006	Ukraine	64	(17)

Managerial career
- 2007–2008: UOR Zvenigorod (assistant)
- 2008–2009: Russia (assistant)
- 2009–2010: Ukraine (assistant)
- 2012–2013: Ukraine U-19 (assistant)
- 2015–2018: Ukraine (assistant)
- 2017–2020: ATEKS-Obolon Kyiv (assistant)
- 2020–2021: Dynamo Kyiv
- 2025–: Obolon Kyiv
- * Club domestic league appearances and goals

Tetyana Verezubova (Ukrainian: Тетяна Олександрівна Верезубова) is a Ukrainian football manager and former football striker.

Verezubova started her football career at 16 when she played for the newly created WFC Arena Kyiv. Also, at 16 Verezubova debuted for the Soviet Union. In 1991, she joined the Soviet champions, Olimp Kyiv. Next year, along with Dynamo Kyiv Verezubova won her first national title, becoming the champion of Ukraine. On 30 June 1992, she debuted for the Ukraine national team in its first international friendly. That day, Ukraine was hosting Moldova, tying the match at 0.

For over 10 seasons she played in the Russian Championship for Energiya Voronezh, Ryazan VDV, Lada Togliatti and Rossiyanka.

She was a member of the Soviet and Ukrainian national teams.
