= 2000 Ukrainian Women's League =

Ukrainian Women's League
- Season: 2000
- Champions: Lehenda-Cheksil Chernihiv
- UEFA Women's Champions League: Lehenda-Cheksil Chernihiv

The 2000 season of the Ukrainian Championship was the 9th season of Ukraine's women's football competitions. The championship ran from 4 August through 26 August first stage and 12 to 16 November 2000 final group.

The UEFA announced the start of the UEFA Women's Cup starting in 2001.

Donchanka Donetsk were the defending champions, having won their fifth league title the previous season.

The clubs were set in two groups, with the top two from each contesting the title in a championship round robin tournament. For the first time, the championship was won by Lehenda-Cheksil Chernihiv.

== Teams ==
Locations of teams in the 2000 Ukrainian Championship Higher League

=== Team changes ===
| Promoted | Relegated |
|---|---|
| Kharkivianka Kharkiv (debut); Dynamo Irpin (debut); Iunist Poltava (debut); SKIF Lviv (return); Mriya Kirovohrad (return) | Hrafit Zaporizhia (dissolved) |

=== Name changes ===
- Mriya last competed in 1994
- SKIF last competed as Lvivianka in 1998

== First stage ==
=== Group A ===
| Pos | Team | Pld | W | D | L | GF | GA | GD | Pts | Qualification or relegation |
|---|---|---|---|---|---|---|---|---|---|---|
| 1 | Donchanka Donetsk | 3 | 3 | 0 | 0 | 29 | 0 | +29 | 9 | Qualified for finals |
| 2 | Iunist Poltava | 3 | 2 | 0 | 1 | 16 | 5 | +11 | 6 | Qualified for finals |
| 3 | Mriya Kirovohrad | 3 | 1 | 0 | 2 | 3 | 34 | −31 | 3 | |
| 4 | Kharkivianka Kharkiv | 3 | 0 | 0 | 3 | 2 | 11 | −9 | 0 | |

Source: WFPL.ua

=== Group B ===
| Pos | Team | Pld | W | D | L | GF | GA | GD | Pts | Qualification or relegation |
|---|---|---|---|---|---|---|---|---|---|---|
| 1 | Lehenda-Cheksil Chernihiv | 3 | 3 | 0 | 0 | 16 | 0 | +16 | 9 | Qualified for finals |
| 2 | Kyivska Rus Kyiv | 3 | 2 | 0 | 1 | 11 | 2 | +9 | 6 | Qualified for finals |
| 3 | Dynamo Irpin | 3 | 1 | 0 | 2 | 3 | 2 | +1 | 3 | |
| 4 | SKIF Lviv | 3 | 0 | 0 | 3 | 0 | 26 | −26 | 0 | |

Source: WFPL.ua

== Finals ==
| Pos | Team | Pld | W | D | L | GF | GA | GD | Pts | Qualification or relegation |
|---|---|---|---|---|---|---|---|---|---|---|
| 1 | Lehenda-Cheksil Chernihiv (C) | 2 | 2 | 0 | 0 | 6 | 2 | +4 | 6 | Qualification to UEFA Women's Cup |
| 2 | Donchanka Donetsk | 2 | 1 | 0 | 1 | 3 | 3 | 0 | 3 | |
| 3 | Kyivska Rus Kyiv | 2 | 0 | 0 | 2 | 2 | 6 | −4 | 0 | |
| – | Iunist Poltava | 0 | – | – | – | – | – | — | 0 | |

Source: WFPL.ua
(C) Champions
