= Nadiia Khavanska =

Ukrainian footballer (born 1989)

Nadiia Khavanska Надія Хаванська (Ukrainian)
Personal information
- Full name: Nadiia Volodymyrivna Khavanska
- Date of birth: 2 April 1989 (age 37)
- Place of birth: Soviet Union (now Ukraine)
- Position: Midfielder

Team information
- Current team: 1207 Antalya Spor
- Number: 15

Senior career*
Years	Team	Apps	(Gls)
2007	Zorya-Spartak Luhansk		
2009-2010	Illichivka Mariupo	14+	(9)
2011	Yatran-Berestivets	6	(3)
2011-2013	Ryazan-VDV	34	(1)
2015	Donchanka Azov		
2017	Zhytlobud-1 Kharkiv	30	(8)
2021	Zhytlobud-1 Kharkiv	6	(0)
2022	Ataşehir Belediyespor	9	(3)
2022-	1207 Antalya Spor	12	(2)

International career^{‡}
2015-	Ukraine	7	(0)
- * Club domestic league appearances and goals as of 18 January 2023 ‡ National team caps and goals as of 22 February 2022

Nadiia Volodymyrivna Khavanska (Ukrainian: Надія Володимирівна Хаванська; born 2 April 1989) is a Ukrainian footballer, who plays as a midfielder for Turkish club 1207 Antalya Spor, and the Ukraine women's national team.

== Club career ==
=== In Ukraine ===
At the beginning of her career, Khavanska played for the Luhansk-based club Zorya-Spartak. In 2008, she moved to Illichivka Mariupol. She scored her debut goal for the team from Mariupol on 23 May 2009 in a home match of the Ukrainian Women's League against Yatran-Berestivts. She spent two seasons in the team. In 2011, she strengthened Yatran-Berestivets, for which she made her debut on 30 April 2011 in an away match of the Ukrainian League against Naftokhimik Kalush. She spent one season in the team, played in six matches and scored three goals of the championship of Ukraine.

In 2017, she returned home to play for Zhytlobud-1 Kharkiv. She made h er debut in the Ukrainian League match against Rodyna Lyceum on 22 April 2017. She scored her debut goal for "Zhytlobud-1" on 30 April 2017 in a home match of the Ukrainian League against Zlagody-Dnipro-1.

=== In Russia ===
In the summer of 2011, she moved to the Russian club Ryazan-VDV, for which she made her debut on 28 August that year in an away match of the Russian Championship against Izmailovo. She scored the only one goal for Ryazan, and that in 2013 in a home match of the Russian Premier League against Mordovochka Saransk. In 2 1/2 seasons with Ryazan-VDV, she played 34 matches scoring one goal in the top league of Russia. In the 2013 season, she enjoyed her team's champion title in Russia. As of 2015, she played in the first league of Russia for Donchanka Azov.

=== In Turkey ===
By March 2022, Khavanska moved to Turkey and signed with the Istanbul-based club Ataşehir Belediyespor to play in the second half of the 2021-22 Women's Super League season. The next season, she transferred to 11207 Antalya Spor.

== International career ==
Khavanska has been capped for the Ukraine national team, appearing for the team during the 2019 FIFA Women's World Cup qualifying cycle.

== Honours ==
Ukrainian Women's League

Zhytlobud-1 Kharkiv
Champions (1): 2017-18
Runners-up (1): 2017

Russian Women's Football Championship

Ryazan-VDV
'Champions (1): 2013
