= 1994 Ukrainian Women's Cup =

Tournament details
- Country: Ukraine

Final positions
- Champions: Donetsk-Ros Donetsk
- Runners-up: Alina Kyiv

The 1994 Ukrainian Women's Cup was the 3rd season of Ukrainian knockout competitions among women teams.

== Participated clubs ==
- Chernihiv Oblast: Lehenda Chernihiv
- Dnipropetrovsk Oblast: Inhulchanka Kryvyi Rih
- Donetsk Oblast (2): Donetsk-Ros Donetsk, Stal Makiivka
- Kherson Oblast: Kolos Kherson
- Kirovohrad Oblast: Krayanka Kirovohrad
- Kyiv (2): Dynamo, Alina
- Luhansk Oblast (2): Unisa Luhansk, Esmira Luhansk
- Mykolaiv Oblast: Lada Mykolaiv
- Odesa Oblast: Chornomorochka Odesa
- Zaporizhia Oblast (2): Iskra Zaporizhia, Stymul-ZDU Zaporizhia

== Competition schedule ==
=== Round of 16 ===
Matches took place on 7 May 1994.

| Team 1 | Score | Team 2 |
|---|---|---|
| Esmira Luhansk | 0–4 | Donetsk-Ros Donetsk |
| Iskra Zaporizhia | w/o | Krayanka Kirovohrad |
| Stal Makiivka | w/o | Stymul-ZDU Zaporizhia |
| Lehenda Chernihiv | w/o | Lada Mykolaiv |
| Kolos Kherson | w/o | Alina Kyiv |
| Inhulchanka Kryvyi Rih | w/o | Chornomorochka Odesa |

=== Quarterfinals ===
Matches of the first leg took place on 9 July 1994, the second leg - 6 August 1994.

| Team 1 | Agg. | Team 2 | 1st leg | 2nd leg |
|---|---|---|---|---|
| Krayanka Kirovohrad | 1–10 | Dynamo Kyiv | 0–4 | 1–6 |
| Lehenda Chernihiv | 1–1 (2–4 p) | Alina Kyiv | 1–0 | 0–1 (a.e.t.) |
| Stal Makiivka | 1–3 | Donetsk-Ros Donetsk | 0–1 | 1–2 |
| Chornomorochka Odesa | w/o | Unisa Luhansk | -/+ (TR) | -/+ (TR) |

=== Semifinals ===
Matches of the first leg took place on 10 September 1994, the second leg - 3 October 1994.

| Team 1 | Agg. | Team 2 | 1st leg | 2nd leg |
|---|---|---|---|---|
| Donetsk-Ros Donetsk | 3–1 | Dynamo Kyiv | 3–1 | 0–0 |
| Alina Kyiv | 4–2 | Unisa Luhansk | 3–0 | 1–2 |

=== Final ===
| Team 1 | Score | Team 2 |
|---|---|---|
| Alina Kyiv | 1–1 (3–4 p) | Donetsk-Ros Donetsk |

== See also ==
- 1994–95 Ukrainian Cup
- 1994 Ukrainian Women's League
