= 1992 Ukrainian Women's Cup =

Tournament details
- Country: Ukraine

Final positions
- Champions: Dynamo Kyiv
- Runners-up: Arena-Hospodar Kyiv

The 1992 Ukrainian Women's Cup was the inaugural season of Ukrainian knockout competitions among women teams.

== Participated clubs ==
- Crimea: Krym-Iuni Simferopol
- Chernihiv Oblast: Lehenda Chernihiv
- Chernivtsi Oblast: Bukovynka Chernivtsi
- Dnipropetrovsk Oblast (2): Svitlana Dnipropetrovsk, Dnipro Dnipropetrovsk
- Donetsk Oblast (2): Azovochka Mariupol, Tekstylshchyk Donetsk
- Kherson Oblast: Tavriya Kherson
- Kirovohrad Oblast: Mriya Kirovohrad
- Kyiv Oblast: Arena-Hospodar Fastiv
- Kyiv (3): Olimp, Radosyn, Dynamo
- Luhansk Oblast (2): Luhanochka Luhansk, Unisa Luhansk
- Lviv Oblast: Lvivianka Lviv
- Odesa Oblast: Chornomorochka Odesa
- Zaporizhia Oblast (2): Iskra Zaporizhia, Borysfen Zaporizhia

== Competition schedule ==
=== First round ===
Matches took place on 2 May 1992.

Team 1	Score	Team 2
Luhanochka Luhansk	6–0	Lvivianka Lviv
Arena-Hospodar Fastiv	0–0 (5–4 p)	Olimp Kyiv
Krym-Iuni Simferopol	+/- (TR)	Chornomorochka Odesa

=== Round of 16 ===
Matches took place on 23 May 1992.

Team 1	Score	Team 2
Bukovynka Chernivtsi	4–0	Mriya Kirovohrad
Unisa Luhansk	+/- (TR)	Tavriya Kherson
Lehenda Chernihiv	0–0 (3–1 p)	Iskra Zaporizhia
Arena-Hospodar Fastiv	2–0	Luhanochka Luhansk
Krym-Iuni Simferpol	+/- (TR)	Svitlana Dnipropetrovsk
Dnipro Dnipropetrovsk	2–1	Radosyn Kyiv
Borysfen Zaporizhia	+/- (TR)	Azovochka Mariupol
Tekstylshchyk Donetsk	1–5	Dynamo Kyiv

=== Quarterfinals ===
Matches of the first leg took place on 4 July 1992, the second leg - 11 July 1992.

Team 1	Agg.	Team 2	1st leg	2nd leg
Bukovynka Chernivtsi	4–0	Unisa Luhansk	2–0	2–0
Lehenda Chernihiv	1–4	Arena-Hospodar Fastiv	0–2	1–2
Krym-Iuni Simferopol	+/- (TR)	Dnipro Dnipropetrovsk	+/- (TR)	+/- (TR)
Borysfen Zaporizhia	1–9	Dynamo Kyiv	0–0	1–9

=== Semifinals ===
Matches of the first leg took place on 29 August 1992, the second leg - 19 September 1992.

Team 1	Agg.	Team 2	1st leg	2nd leg
Arena-Hospodar Fastiv	2–1	Bukovynka Chernivtsi	1–1	1–0
Krym-Iuni Simferopol	0–7	Dynamo Kyiv	0–2	0–5

=== Final ===
Team 1	Agg.	Team 2	1st leg	2nd leg
Arena-Hospodar Fastiv	0–1	Dynamo Kyiv	0–1	0–0

== See also ==
- 1992 Ukrainian Cup
- 1992 Vyshcha Liha (women)
