= 1995 Ukrainian Women's League =

Ukrainian Women's League
- Season: 1995
- Champions: Varna Donetsk

The 1995 season of the Ukrainian Championship was the 4th season of Ukraine's women's football competitions. The championship ran from 5 May 1995 to 9 October 1995.

Before the start, many clubs withdrew from the league again.

Varna Donetsk were the defending champions, having won their first league title in the previous season.

== Teams ==
Locations of teams in the 1995 Ukrainian Championship Higher League

=== Team changes ===
Promoted	Relegated
Harmonia Lviv (debut); Spartak Kyiv (debut)	Dynamo Kyiv (dissolved); Iunisa Kyiv (dissolved); Kraianka Kirovohrad (dissolved); Esmira Luhansk (dissolved); Inhulchanka Kryvyi Rih (dissolved); Kolos Kherson (dissolved)

=== Name changes ===
- Varna Donetsk last season was called Donetsk-Ros
- Spartak Kyiv replaced Iunisa that last season moved to Kyiv
- Harmoniya Lviv was debuting, but Lvivianka last played in 1993 Persha Liha.

== Higher League ==
=== League table ===
Pos	Team	Pld	W	D	L	GF	GA	GD	Pts	Qualification or relegation
1	Alina Kyiv	16	13	2	1	51	6	+45	41	Championship final
2	Varna Donetsk	16	13	2	1	34	3	+31	41	Championship final
3	Spartak Kyiv	16	8	5	3	36	12	+24	29	
4	Lehenda Chernihiv	16	8	2	6	23	16	+7	26	
5	Stal Makiivka	16	7	4	5	21	14	+7	25	
6	Chornomorochka Odesa	16	4	2	10	18	20	−2	14	
7	Lada Mykolaiv	16	4	2	10	10	22	−12	14	
8	Iskra Zaporizhia	16	3	3	10	6	36	−30	12	
9	Harmonia	16	1	0	15	2	72	−70	3	

Source: WFPL.ua, Womensfootball.ua

== Championship final ==
9 October 1995	Varna Donetsk	2 – 1	Alina Kyiv	Dnipropetrovsk
13:00	Mykhailenko (<45); Frishko (<90)	Report	Zinchenko (<45)	Stadium: Metalurh; Attendance: 500
