= Anna Tatarinova =

Belarusian footballer

Personal information
- Full name: Anna Tatarinova
- Date of birth: 7 March 1978 (age 48)
- Place of birth: Brest, Belarusian SSR, Soviet Union
- Position: Midfielder

Team information
- Current team: Zhytlobud Kharkiv
- Number: 25

Youth career
- 1990–1993: Viktoriya sports school, Brest

Senior career*
Years	Team	Apps	(Gls)
1993–1998	Viktoriya Brest		
1999–2002	Bobruichanka		
2002	Metalurh-Donchanka		
2003–2005	Metalist Kharkiv		
2006–2012	Zhytlobud Kharkiv		

International career
1999–2012	Belarus		
- * Club domestic league appearances and goals

Anna Tatarinova (Belarusian: Ганна Васільеўна Татарынава, Hanna Vasilyewna Tatarynava) is a former Belarusian football midfielder who for an extended period played in the Ukrainian Women's League. With Zhytlobud Kharkiv she has also played in the Champions League. In 1999 she made her debut for the Belarusian national team, and two years later she played the inaugural edition of the European Cup for FC Bobruichanka.
