= 1993 Ukrainian Women's League =

Ukrainian Women's League
- Season: 1993
- Champions: Arena Kyiv
- Relegated: 8 clubs withdrew

The 1993 season of the Ukrainian Championship was the 2nd season of Ukraine's women's football competitions. The championship ran from 18 April 1993 to 7 November 1993.

Dynamo Kyiv were the defending champions, having won their first league title in the previous season.

== Teams ==
Locations of teams in the 1993 Ukrainian Championship Higher League
Locations of teams in the 1993 Ukrainian Championship First League

=== Team changes ===
Promoted from 1992 First League	Relegated from 1992 Higher League
Teksylnyk Donetsk (debut); Iunisa Luhansk (debut); Iskra Zaporizhia (debut); Alina Kyiv (debut)	Bukovynka Chernivtsi (dissolved)

=== Name changes ===
- Tornado Kyiv, last season the club was known as Olimp Kyiv
- Alina Kyiv, last season the club was known as Radosyn Kyiv

== Higher League ==
=== League table ===
Pos	Team	Pld	W	D	L	GF	GA	GD	Pts	Qualification or relegation
1	Arena Kyiv	24	20	4	0	47	5	+42	44	Champion and withdrew
2	Dynamo Kyiv	24	20	0	4	76	11	+65	40	
3	Tornado Kyiv	24	14	5	5	39	16	+23	33	Withdrew after the season
4	Lehenda Chernihiv	24	13	5	6	22	15	+7	31	
5	Luhanochka Luhansk	24	12	6	6	29	24	+5	30	Withdrew after the season
6	Iskra Zaporizhia	24	10	8	6	31	27	+4	28	
7	Tekstylnyk Donetsk	24	11	4	9	36	39	−3	26	
8	Iunisa Luhansk	24	10	4	10	32	26	+6	24	
9	Krym-Yuni Simferopol	24	6	4	14	13	38	−25	16	Withdrew after the season
10	Borysfen Zaporizhia	24	4	5	15	15	37	−22	13	Withdrew after the season
11	Alina Kyiv	24	3	4	17	9	55	−46	10	
12	Chornomorochka Odesa	24	3	3	18	8	58	−50	9	
13	Dnipro Dnipropetrovsk	24	2	4	18	13	19	−6	8	Withdrew after the season

Source: WFPL.ua, Womensfootball.ua

=== Top scorers ===
Rank	Player	Club	Goals
1	(Ukraine) Svitlana Frishko	Dynamo Kyiv	16

== First League ==
=== League table ===
Pos	Team	Pld	W	D	L	GF	GA	GD	Pts	Qualification or relegation
1	Stymul-ZDU Zaporizhia	20	19	1	0	74	4	+70	39	Champion and withdrew
2	Lvivianka	20	12	3	5	51	18	+33	27	Withdrew after the season
3	Lada Mykolaiv	20	12	1	7	42	19	+23	25	Promoted to Higher League
4	Mria Kirovohrad	20	7	1	12	26	47	−21	15	Promoted to Higher League
5	Tavria Kherson	20	6	2	12	24	26	−2	14	Promoted to Higher League
6	Kontek Luhansk	20	0	0	20	5	108	−103	0	Promoted to Higher League

Source: WFPL.ua, Womensfootball.ua
