= 1999 Ukrainian Women's League =

Ukrainian Women's League
- Season: 1999
- Champions: Donchanka Donetsk

The 1999 season of the Ukrainian Championship was the 8th season of Ukraine's women's football competitions. The championship ran from 14 May 1999 to 14 September 1999.

Donchanka Donetsk were the defending champions, having won their fourth league title the previous season. This was the last season WFC Donchanka ever won a national title.

== Teams ==
Locations of teams in the 1999 Ukrainian Championship Higher League

=== Team changes ===
Promoted	Relegated
Kyivska Rus Kyiv (debut)	Lvivianka Lviv (dissolved)

=== Name changes ===
- Kyivska Rus was debuting, but the last Kyiv team Alina last competed in 1997

== Higher League ==
=== League table ===
Pos	Team	Pld	W	D	L	GF	GA	GD	Pts	Qualification or relegation
1	Donchanka-Varna Donetsk	12	10	1	1	52	3	+49	31	Champions
2	Lehenda-Cheksil Chernihiv	12	8	1	3	30	7	+23	25	
3	Hrafit Zaporizhia	11	3	2	6	27	15	+12	11	
4	Kyivska Rus Kyiv	11	0	0	11	2	86	−84	0	

Source: WFPL.ua
