= 1995 Ukrainian Women's Cup =

Tournament details
- Country: Ukraine

Final positions
- Champions: Alina Kyiv
- Runners-up: Donetsk-Ros Donetsk

The 1995 Ukrainian Women's Cup was the 4th season of Ukrainian knockout competitions among women teams.

== Participated clubs ==
- Chernihiv Oblast: Lehenda Chernihiv
- Donetsk Oblast (2): Donetsk-Ros Donetsk, Stal Makiivka
- Kyiv (2): Spartak, Alina
- Lviv Oblast: Harmoniya
- Mykolaiv Oblast: Lada Mykolaiv
- Odesa Oblast: Chornomorochka Odesa
- Zaporizhia Oblast: Iskra Zaporizhia

== Competition schedule ==
=== Round of 16 ===
Matches took place on 24 May 1995.

Team 1	Score	Team 2
Lehenda Chernihiv	0–1	Stal Makiivka

=== Quarterfinals ===
Matches of the first leg took place on 14 June 1995, the second leg - 21 June 1995.

Team 1	Agg.	Team 2	1st leg	2nd leg
Iskra Zaporizhia	5–7	Alina Kyiv	3–3	2–4
Harmoniya Lviv (Note: In some sources it shows as Radosin Kyiv. Radosin changed its name to Alina several years before, in 1993. Also, Radosin was not taking part in league competitions.)	w/o	Spartak Kyiv	0–8	-/+ (TR)
Donetsk-Ros Donetsk	w/o	Chornomorochka Odesa	+/- (TR)	+/- (TR)
Stal Makiivka	w/o	Lada Mykolaiv	+/- (TR)	+/- (TR)

=== Semifinals ===
Matches of the first leg took place on 8-9 August 1995, the second leg - 9 September 1995.

Team 1	Agg.	Team 2	1st leg	2nd leg
Spartak Kyiv	2–5	Alina Kyiv	0–2	2–3
Stal Makiivka	w/o	Donetsk-Ros Donetsk	0–1	-/+ (TR)

=== Final ===
Team 1	Score	Team 2
Alina Kyiv	2–1	Donetsk-Ros Donetsk

== See also ==
- 1995–96 Ukrainian Cup
- 1995 Ukrainian Women's League
