= 2014 Ukrainian Women's League =

Ukrainian Football Championship
- Season: 2014
- Champions: Zhytlobud-1 Kharkiv
- UEFA Women's Champions League: Zhytlobud-1 Kharkiv

The 2014 season of the Ukrainian Football Championship was the 23rd season of Ukraine's women's football league. It ran from 18 April 2014 to 27 October 2014.

== Teams ==
Locations of teams in the 2014 Higher League

=== Team changes ===
Promoted from Persha Liha	Withdrawn
Iatran Berestivets	Naftokhimik Kalush

=== Stadiums ===
Team	Home city	Home ground	Capacity
Iatran	Uman	Stadion Umanfermash	
Ateks SDIuShOR-16	Kyiv	Stadion DVRZ-Dniprovets	
Rodyna	Kostopil	Stadion Kolos	
Donchanka	Donetsk	Stadion Kirovets	
Illichivka	Mariupol	Illichivets Sports Complex	
Lehenda-ShVSM	Chernihiv	Stadion Tekstylschyk	3,000
Zhytlobud-1	Liubotyn	Stadion Olimpiyets	
Zhytlobud-2	Komsomolske	Stadion Enerhetyk	

== Vyshcha Liha table ==
Pos	Team	Pld	W	D	L	GF	GA	GD	Pts	Qualification or relegation
1	Zhytlobud-1 Kharkiv (Note: Participant of the 2014 Ukrainian Women's Cup final.)	14	12	2	0	54	3	+51	38	Qualification to Champions League
2	Zhytlobud-2 Kharkiv	14	12	2	0	43	4	+39	38	
3	Lehenda-ShVSM Chernihiv (Note: Lehenda had 3 points deducted for not appearing in the game against Illichivka.)	14	9	0	5	31	13	+18	24	
4	Iatran Berestivets	14	7	1	6	20	22	−2	22	
5	Illichivka Mariupol	14	5	1	8	7	18	−11	16	
6	Rodyna Kostopil	14	5	0	9	8	41	−33	15	
7	Ateks SDIuShOR-16 Kyiv (Note: Ateks had 3 points deducted for not appearing in the game against Illichivka.)	14	2	0	12	0	63	−63	3	
8	TsPOR-Donchanka Donetsk (Note: WFC Donchanka withdrew soon after the start of the season. Instead of annulling their records, all of their non-played games were awarded to them as losses and to their opponents as wins.)	14	1	0	13	1	0	+1	3	Withdrew

Source: wfpl.com.ua
Rules for classification: 1) Points; 2) Head-to-head points; 3) Head-to-head goal difference; 4) Head-to-head goals scored; 5) Goal difference; 6) Goals scored.

=== Vyshcha Liha Results ===
Home \ Away	ATK	IAT	ILL	LCH	ROD	DON	ZH1	ZH2
Ateks SDIuShOR-16 Kyiv		0–2	0–2	0–5	0–1	+:-	0–8	0–7
Iatran Berestivets	10–0		1–0	2–4	1–0	+:-	0–6	0–1
Illichivka Mariupol	+:-	0–0		+:-	4–0	0–1	0–3	0–3
Lehenda-ShVSM Chernihiv	5–0	4–0	3–0		4–0	+:-	0–1	0–1
Rodyna Kostopil	4–0	0–2	2–0	1–5		+:-	0–10	0–1
TsPOR-Donchanka Donetsk	-:+	-:+	-:+	-:+	-:+		-:+	-:+
Zhytlobud-1 Kharkiv	4–0	5–1	3–1	5–0	8–0	+:-		0–0
Zhytlobud-2 Kharkiv	15–0	2–1	3–0	3–2	6–0	+:-	1–1	

Source: WFPL.UA
Legend: Blue = home team win; Yellow = draw; Red = away team win.

=== Top scorers ===
Rank	Player	Club	Goals
1	(Ukraine) Yana Kalinina	Zhytlobud-2 Kharkiv	15 (2)
2	(Ukraine) Mariya Tykhonova	Zhytlobud-1 Kharkiv	11 (3)
3	(Ukraine) Olha Ovdiychuk	Zhytlobud-1 Kharkiv	9 (0)
4	(Ukraine) Anna Voronina	Donchanka → Zhytlobud-1	8 (0)
4	(Ukraine) Anna Mozolska	Zhytlobud-1 Kharkiv	8 (0)
6	(Ukraine) Yana Malakhova	Zhytlobud-1 Kharkiv	6 (0)
