= 1996 Ukrainian Women's League =

Ukrainian Women's League
- Season: 1996
- Dates: 26 April 1996 – 14 October 1996
- Champions: Varna Donetsk
- Matches: 26

The 1996 season of the Ukrainian Championship was the 5th season of Ukraine's women's football competitions. The championship ran from 26 April 1996 to 14 October 1996.

Before the start, three more clubs withdrew from the league.

Varna Donetsk were the defending champions, having won their second league title the previous season, and became the sole leader in the league titles.

== Teams ==
Locations of teams in the 1996 Ukrainian Championship Higher League

=== Team changes ===
Promoted	Relegated
none	Spartak Kyiv (dissolved); Haromonia Lviv (dissolved); Lada Mykolaiv (dissolved)

=== Name changes ===
- none

== Higher League ==
=== League table ===
Pos	Team	Pld	W	D	L	GF	GA	GD	Pts	Qualification or relegation
1	Varna Donetsk	10	9	1	0	36	5	+31	28	Champions
2	Alina Kyiv	10	7	2	1	28	7	+21	23	
3	Stal Makiivka	10	3	3	4	7	7	0	12	
4	Chornomorochka Odesa	10	2	4	4	5	13	−8	10	
5	Lehenda Chernihiv	10	2	1	7	5	13	−8	7	
6	Iskra Zaporizhia	10	1	1	8	4	40	−36	4	

Source: WFPL.ua
