= 2002 Ukrainian Women's League =

Ukrainian Women's League
- Season: 2002
- Champions: Lehenda-Cheksil Chernihiv
- UEFA Women's Champions League: Lehenda-Cheksil Chernihiv

The 2002 season of the Ukrainian Championship was the 11th season of Ukraine's women's football competitions. The championship ran from 15 April to 23 August 2002.

As the previous season, the clubs were set in two groups with the top two from each contesting the title in championship round robin tournament.

== Teams ==
Locations of teams in the 2002 Ukrainian Championship Higher League

=== Team changes ===
Promoted	Relegated
TsPOR Donetsk (debut)	Kyivska Rus Kyiv (dissolved)

=== Name changes ===
- Donchanka Donetsk changed its name to Metalurh-Donchanka Donetsk.
- Kharkivianka Kharkiv changed its name to FC Kharkiv before the final group tournament.

== First stage ==
=== Group West ===
Pos	Team	Pld	W	D	L	GF	GA	GD	Pts	Qualification or relegation
1	Lehenda-Cheksil Chernihiv	5	4	0	1	23	5	+18	12	Qualified for finals
2	Luhanochka Luhansk	5	2	1	2	10	11	−1	7	Qualified for finals
3	Volyn Lutsk	3	1	1	1	5	4	+1	4	
4	TsPOR Donetsk	5	0	2	3	1	19	−18	2	

Source: WFPL.ua

=== Group East ===
Pos	Team	Pld	W	D	L	GF	GA	GD	Pts	Qualification or relegation
1	Metalurh-Donchanka	5	3	0	2	19	6	+13	9	Qualified for finals
2	Kharkivianka Kharkiv	5	3	0	2	13	12	+1	9	Qualified for finals
3	Lvivianka Lviv	3	1	1	1	9	10	−1	4	
4	Iunist Poltava	5	1	1	3	6	19	−13	4	

Source: WFPL.ua

== Finals ==
Pos	Team	Pld	W	D	L	GF	GA	GD	Pts	Qualification or relegation
1	Lehenda-Cheksil Chernihiv (C)	4	3	0	1	8	4	+4	9	Qualification to UEFA Women's Cup
2	FC Kharkiv	4	1	1	2	7	8	−1	4	
3	Metlurh-Donchanka	4	1	1	2	4	7	−3	4	
–	Luhanochka Luhansk	0	–	–	–	–	–	—	0	

Source: WFPL.ua
(C) Champions
