= Radoslava Slavcheva =

Bulgarian footballer (born 1984)

Personal information
- Full name: Radoslava Ivanova Slavcheva
- Date of birth: 18 July 1984 (age 42)
- Place of birth: Veliko Tarnovo, Bulgaria
- Height: 1.73 m (5 ft 8 in)
- Position: Defender

Senior career*
Years	Team	Apps	(Gls)
- Super Sport
- Amazones Dramas
2010–2018	Medyk Konin		

International career
2006–2014	Bulgaria	77	(2)
- * Club domestic league appearances and goals

Radoslava Ivanova Slavcheva (Bulgarian: Радослава Иванова Славчева; born 18 July 1984) is a Bulgarian footballer who plays as a defender. She has been a member of the Bulgaria women's national team.

== Honours ==
Naftokhimik Kalush

- Ukrainian Women's League: 2007

Medyk Konin

- Ekstraliga: 2013–14, 2014–15, 2015–16, 2016–17
- Polish Cup: 2012–13, 2013–14, 2014–15, 2015–16, 2016–17
