= Serhiy Kachkarov =

Professional Ukrainian football coach

Personal information
- Full name: Serhiy Hryhorovych Kachkarov
- Date of birth: 16 September 1948
- Place of birth: Ukrainian SSR, Soviet Union
- Date of death: 7 August 2011 (aged 62)
- Place of death: Ukraine

Managerial career
- Years: Team
- 1987–1989: SKA Kiev (assistant)
- 1990–1991: SKA Kiev
- 1992: SKA Kiev (staff)
- 1993–1996: Ukraine (women)
- 1990s: WFC Arena Kyiv
- 1990s: WFC Donchanka Donetsk
- 1999: Ukraine (women)
- 2009: FC Monolit Illichivsk

Serhiy Hryhorovych Kachkarov (Ukrainian: Сергій Григорович Качкаров; 16 September 1948 – 7 August 2011) was a professional Ukrainian football coach.

In the 1990s, he served as a head coach of the Ukraine women's national football team.
