= Olena Khodyreva =

Ukrainian footballer (born 1981)

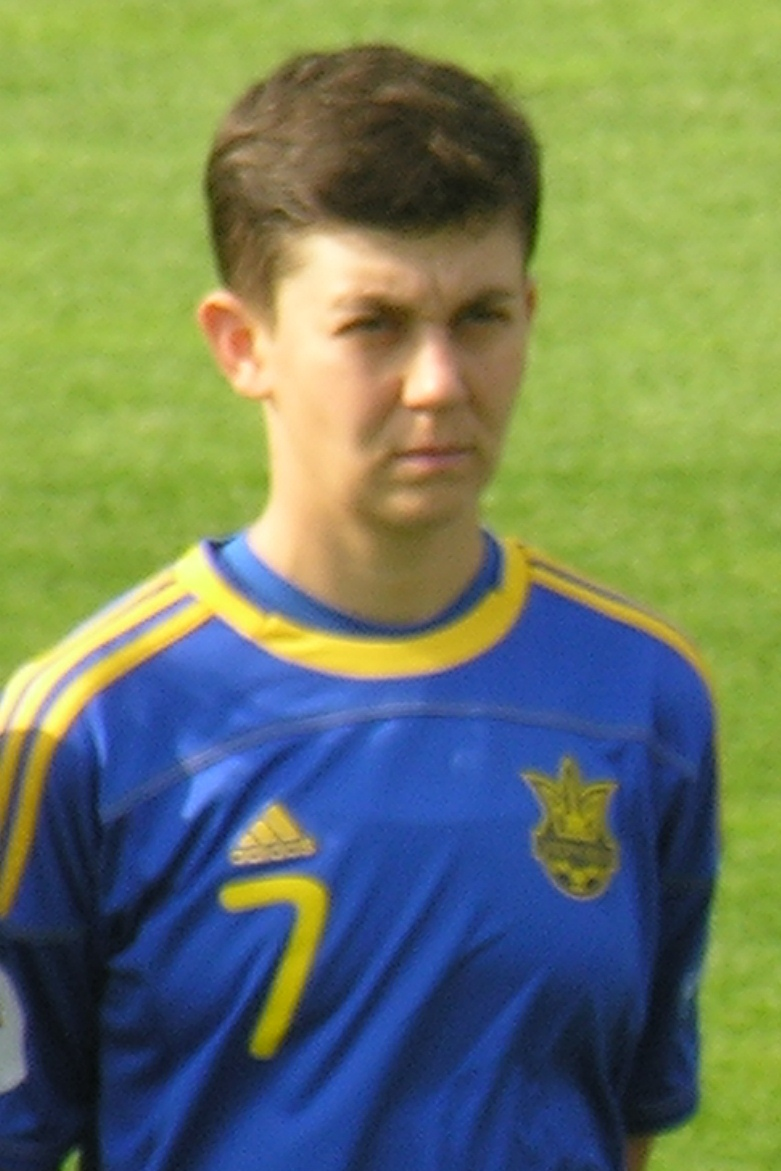

Personal information
- Full name: Olena Khodyreva
- Date of birth: 19 May 1981 (age 45)
- Place of birth: Soviet Union
- Position: Defender

Senior career*
Years	Team	Apps	(Gls)
- Lehenda Chernihiv
2002	→ Gömrükçü Baku		
2006	Nadezhda Noginsk		
2007–2008	Zvezda Perm		
2009	Lehenda Chernihiv		
2010–2012	Zvezda Perm		
2012–2013	Naftokhimik Kalush		
2014–	Zhytlobud-2 Kharkiv		

International career
2001–	Ukraine		
- * Club domestic league appearances and goals

Olena Khodyreva is a former Ukrainian football defender, who played for Zhytlobud-2 Kharkiv in the Ukrainian League. She previously played for Lehenda Chernihiv and Naftokhimik Kalush in Ukraine and Nadezhda Noginsk and Zvezda Perm in the Russian Championship. She has played the European Cup with Gömrükçü Baku, Lehenda and Zvezda.

She is a member of the Ukraine national team since 2001, and took part in the 2009 European Championship.

== Titles ==
- 2 Russian Leagues (2007, 2008)
- 1 Russian Cup (2007)
- 5 Ukrainian Leagues (2000, 2001, 2002, 2005, 2009)
- 4 Ukrainian Cups (2001, 2002, 2005, 2009)
