= Vanat =

Vanat is a Ukrainian surname. Notable people with the surname include:

- Iryna Vanat (born 1971), Ukrainian footballer
- Vladyslav Vanat (born 2002), Ukrainian footballer
