= 2003 Ukrainian Women's League =

Ukrainian Women's League
- Season: 2003
- Champions: Kharkiv-Kondytsioner
- UEFA Women's Champions League: Kharkiv-Kondytsioner
- Top goalscorer: Raimonda Kudytė (20 goals)

The 2003 season of the Ukrainian Championship was the 12th season of Ukraine's women's football competitions. The championship ran from 30 April to 31 October 2003.

== Teams ==
Locations of teams in the 2003 Ukrainian Championship Higher League

=== Team changes ===
Promoted	Relegated
Ateks Kyiv (debut); Oleksandriya Kyiv (debut); Slaviya Kyiv (debut); Spartak Sumy (debut); Azovochka Mariupol (debut)	Volyn Lutsk (dissolved); Lvivianka Lviv (withdrew)

=== Name changes ===
- FC Kharkiv changed its name to Kharkiv-Kondytsioner Kharkiv.
- TsPOR was merged with Metalurh-Donchanka and changed its name to TsPOR-Donchanka.
- Iunist Poltava changed its name to Kolos Poltava.
- Kyiv had three teams debuting, while previously the last Kyivan team that competed was in 2001

== First stage ==
=== Group 1 ===
Pos	Team	Pld	W	D	L	GF	GA	GD	Pts	Qualification or relegation
1	Kharkiv-Kondytsioner	4	4	0	0	30	0	+30	12	Qualified to Second stage
2	TsPOR-Donchanka Donetsk	4	3	0	1	10	2	+8	9	Qualified to Second stage
3	Kolos Poltava	4	2	0	2	11	7	+4	6	Qualified to Second stage
4	Ateks Kyiv	4	1	0	3	7	17	−10	3	Qualified to Second stage
5	Azovochka Mariupol	4	0	0	4	2	34	−32	0	

Source: WFPL.ua

=== Group 2 ===
Pos	Team	Pld	W	D	L	GF	GA	GD	Pts	Qualification or relegation
1	Lehenda-ShVSM Chernihiv	4	4	0	0	36	0	+36	12	Qualified to Second stage
2	Luhanochka Luhansk	4	3	0	1	15	9	+6	9	Qualified to Second stage
3	Spartak Sumy	4	2	0	2	6	16	−10	6	Qualified to Second stage
4	Oleksandriya Kyiv	4	1	0	3	6	18	−12	3	
5	Slaviya Kyiv	4	0	0	4	2	22	−20	0	

Source: WFPL.ua

== Second stage ==
Pos	Team	Pld	W	D	L	GF	GA	GD	Pts	Qualification or relegation
1	Kharkiv-Kondytsioner (C)	12	11	1	0	90	4	+86	34	Qualified to UEFA Women's Cup
2	Lehenda-Cheksil Chernihiv	12	9	2	1	57	3	+54	29	
3	TsPOR-Donchanka Donetsk	12	6	3	3	32	21	+11	21	
4	Spartak Sumy	12	4	0	8	9	40	−31	12	
5	Luhanochka Luhansk	12	3	3	6	24	26	−2	12	
6	Kolos Poltava	12	3	3	6	5	35	−30	12	
7	Ateks Kyiv	12	0	0	12	4	92	−88	0	

Source: WFPL.ua
(C) Champions

=== Top scorers ===
Rank	Player	Club	Goals
1	(Lithuania) Raimonda Kudytė	Kharkiv-Kondytsioner	20
