= Svitlana Frishko =

Ukrainian footballer (born 1976)

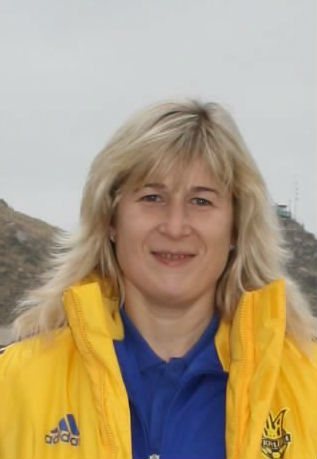
- Svitlana Frishko in 2014

Personal information
- Full name: Світлана Фрішко
- Date of birth: 15 March 1976 (age 50)
- Place of birth: Odesa, Soviet Union
- Position: Striker

Senior career*
| Years | Team | Apps | (Gls) |
| 1988–1989 | Prymorets Odesa | | |
| 1990 | Niva Hrodna | | |
| 1991–1994 | Dynamo Kyiv | 56 | (43) |
| 1995–1999 | Donechanka | 44 | (11) |
- Metalist Kharkiv
| 2001 | Codru Chişinău | | |
| 2005–2006 | Spartak Moscow | | |
| 2007 | Nadezhda Noginsk | | |
| 2008 | SKA Rostov | | |
| 2009 | Zhilstroy-1 Kharkiv | | |
| 2013 | Illichivka Mariupol | 13 | (6) |
| 2014 | Chornomorets Odesa | 5 | (5) |
| 2015 | Pantery Uman | 7 | (8) |
| 2016 | Torpedochka | 8 | (8) |
| 2017–2018 | Mariupol | 8 | (9) |
| 2018–2019 | Pantery Uman | 8 | (1) |
| 2019–2020 | Mariupol | 3 | (0) |

International career
| 1989–1991 | Soviet Union | | |
| 1992–2011 | Ukraine | 79 | (31) |
- * Club domestic league appearances and goals

Svitlana Frishko (born 1976) is a Ukrainian football striker, currently playing for Zhilstroy-1 Kharkiv in the Ukrainian League. She has also played in the Russian Championship for Spartak Moscow, Nadezhda Noginsk and SKA Rostov.

She has been a member of the Ukrainian national team since its first match in August 1993, and was called up for the 2009 European Championship though she didn't play.

She was officially recognized as the best woman football player of Ukraine of the 20th century.
