= Pohoryna Kostopil =

- Full name: Pohoryna Kostopil
- Founded: 2003 (as Rodyna); 2021 (rebranding)
- Ground: Stadion "Kolos", Kostopil, Rivne Oblast
- Capacity: 1,330
- Chairman: Ivan Nadyeyin
- Manager: Olena Ruda
- League: Ukrainian Women's League
- Website: nkveres.com/zhinocha-komanda-nk-veres

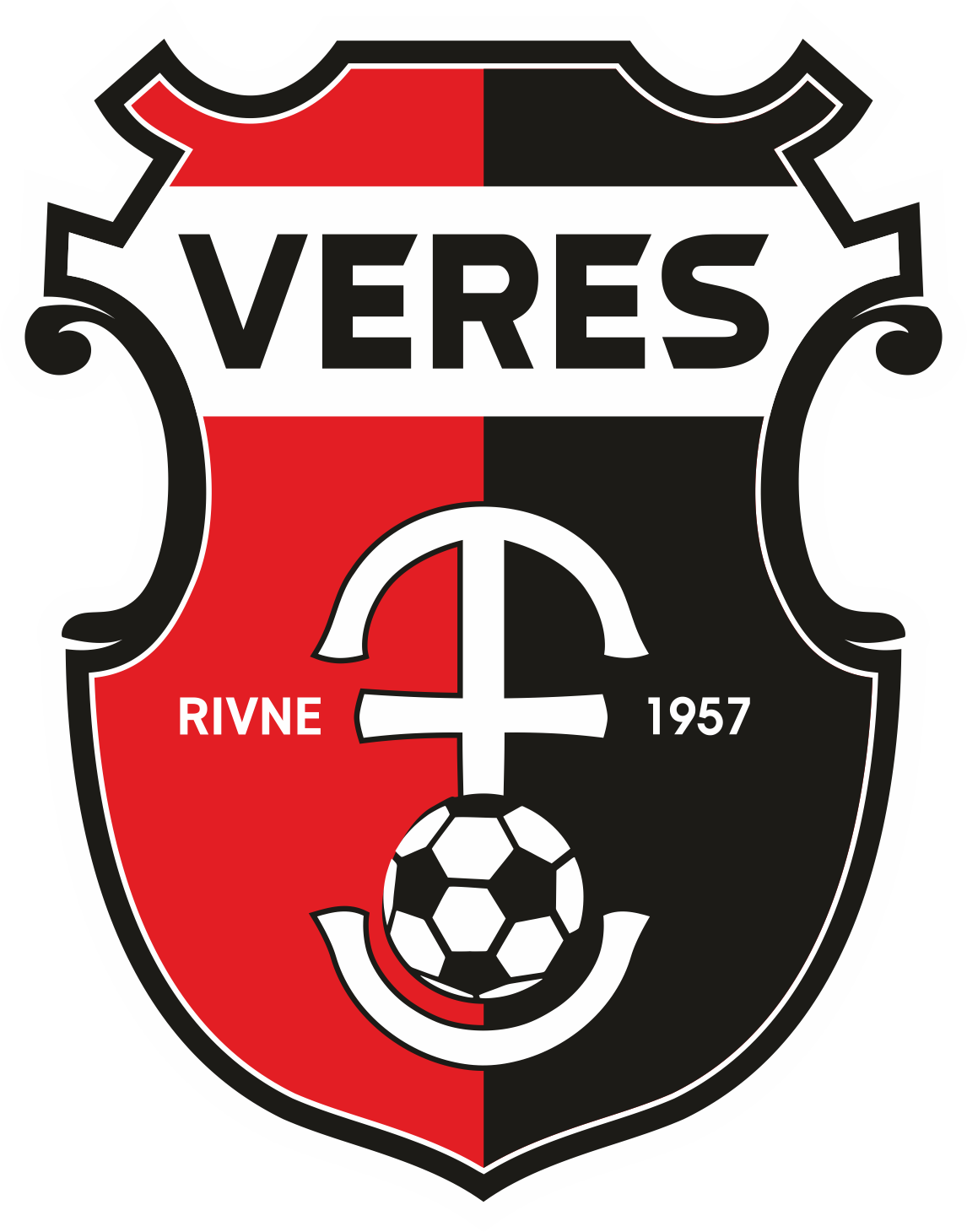
older logo

Pohoryna Kostopil is a Ukrainian women's football team based out of Kostopil, Rivne Oblast. Until 2021, as Rodyna, it was based on a local sports school, and then for a short period, it was part of the football club Veres Rivne. In 2024, Veres dropped its women's department, and the team was renamed.

== History ==
The club was founded in 2003 based out of the Kostopil regional sports boarding school (KOLISP), which itself was founded a couple of years prior. The club was named after a local food factory, "Rodyna". In 2005–2020, the club played in the Higher League of the Ukrainian Women's League. The club's first team played in the Women's Higher League for 16 seasons, recording 212 games played, winning 39, drawing 30, and losing 143 times, earning 147 points. It also scored 200 goals and allowed 664.

In April 2021, Kolos Stadium was rebuilt, while NK Veres Rivne continued its negotiations to acquire the local women's team.

Its first training session under new brand, the team conducted in July 2021.

== Former presidents ==
- until 2021 Mykhailo Kryvko
