= 1998 Ukrainian Women's League =

Ukrainian Women's League
- Season: 1998
- Champions: Donchanka Donetsk

The 1998 season of the Ukrainian Championship was the 7th season of Ukraine's women's football competitions. The championship ran from 24 April 1998 to 8 July 1998.

The championship was played as a sextuple round-robin tournament compared to last year's quadruple round-robin.

The last season's champions, Alina Kyiv, having won their first league title, withdrew before the season.

== Teams ==
Locations of teams in the 1998 Ukrainian Championship Higher League

=== Team changes ===
Promoted	Relegated
Lvivianka Lviv (debut)	Stal-Nika-MMK Makiivka (dissolved); Alina Kyiv (dissolved)

=== Name changes ===
- Donchanka Donetsk, last season was known as Donchanka-Varna Donetsk
- Lvivianka Lviv, last competed in the 1993 Persha Liha, but Harmoniya played in the 1995 Vyshcha Liha

== Higher League ==
=== League table ===
Pos	Team	Pld	W	D	L	GF	GA	GD	Pts	Qualification or relegation
1	Donchanka-Varna Donetsk	18	16	1	1	61	5	+56	49	Champions
2	Lehenda-Cheksil Chernihiv	18	10	3	5	43	12	+31	33	
3	Hrafit Zaporizhia	18	5	2	11	16	36	−20	17	
4	Lvivianka Lviv	18	2	0	16	2	69	−67	6	

Source: WFPL.ua
