= 1994 Ukrainian Women's League =

Ukrainian Women's League
- Season: 1994
- Champions: Donetsk-Ros
- Relegated: 5 clubs withdrew

The 1994 season of the Ukrainian Championship was the 3rd season of Ukraine's women's football competitions. The championship ran from 22 April 1994 to 19 October 1994.

Before the start, many clubs withdrew from the league, and both the Higher and First leagues were merged.

The last season's champions, Arena Kyiv, having won their first league title, withdrew before the season.

== Teams ==
Locations of teams in the 1994 Ukrainian Championship Higher League

=== Team changes ===
Promoted from 1993 First League	Relegated from 1993 Higher League
Kraianka Kirovohrad (debut); Lada Mykolaiv (debut); Kolos Kherson (debut); Esmira Luhansk (debut)	Dnipro Dnipropetrovsk (dissolved); Tornado Kyiv (dissolved); Arena Kyiv (dissolved); Borysfen Zaporizhia (dissolved); Luhanochka Luhansk (dissolved); Krym-Iuni Simferopol (dissolved)
Promoted	Dnipro Dnipropetrovsk (dissolved); Tornado Kyiv (dissolved); Arena Kyiv (dissolved); Borysfen Zaporizhia (dissolved); Luhanochka Luhansk (dissolved); Krym-Iuni Simferopol (dissolved)
Stal Makiivka (debut); Inhulchanka Kryvyi Rih (debut)	Dnipro Dnipropetrovsk (dissolved); Tornado Kyiv (dissolved); Arena Kyiv (dissolved); Borysfen Zaporizhia (dissolved); Luhanochka Luhansk (dissolved); Krym-Iuni Simferopol (dissolved)

=== Name changes ===
- Donetsk-Ros last season was called Tekstylnyk Donetsk
- Iunisa Kyiv last season was located in Luhansk
- Kraianka Kirovohrad last season was called Mria Kirovohrad
- Esmira Luhansk last season was called Kontek Luhansk
- Kolos Kherson last season was called Hart-Tavria Kherson

== Higher League ==
=== League table ===
Pos	Team	Pld	W	D	L	GF	GA	GD	Pts	Qualification or relegation
1	Donetsk-Ros	20	16	4	0	60	12	+48	52	Champions
2	Iunisa Kyiv	20	13	4	3	34	14	+20	43	
3	Alina Kyiv	20	14	1	5	54	27	+27	43	
4	Dynamo Kyiv	20	12	5	3	26	6	+20	41	Withdrew after the season
5	Stal Makiivka	20	10	4	6	30	16	+14	34	
6	Lehenda Chernihiv	20	9	3	8	32	23	+9	30	
7	Iskra Zaporizhia	20	6	5	9	16	22	−6	23	
8	Chornomorochka Odesa	20	7	2	11	15	29	−14	23	
9	Lada Mykolaiv	20	5	1	14	12	32	−20	16	
10	Kraianka Kirovohrad	20	2	1	17	7	77	−70	7	Withdrew after the season
11	Esmira Luhansk	20	0	2	18	7	35	−28	2	Withdrew after the season
–	Kolos Kherson	8	2	1	5	9	19	−10	7	Withdrew during the season, games annulled
–	Inhulchanka Kryvyi Rih	8	0	0	8	2	38	−36	0	Withdrew during the season, games annulled

Source: WFPL.ua, Womensfootball.ua

=== Top scorers ===
Rank	Player	Club	Goals
1	(Ukraine) Halyna Mykhaylenko	Donetsk-Ros	12
