= 1997 Ukrainian Women's League =

Ukrainian Women's League
- Season: 1997
- Champions: Alina Kyiv

The 1997 season of the Ukrainian Championship was the 6th season of Ukraine's women's football competitions. The championship ran from 2 May 1997 to 8 October 1997.

The championship was played as a quadruple round-robin compared to last year's double round-robin, as the number of participants decreased.

Donchanka-Varna Donetsk were the defending champions, having won their third league title the previous season.

== Teams ==
Locations of teams in the 1997 Ukrainian Championship Higher League

=== Team changes ===
Promoted	Relegated
none	Chornomorochka Odesa (dissolved)

=== Name changes ===
- Hrafit Zaporizhia, last season was known as Iskra Zaporizhia
- Donchanka-Varna Donetsk, last season was known as Varna Donetsk
- Lehenda-Cheksil Chernihiv, last season was known as Lehenda Chernihiv
- Stal-Nika-MMK Makiivka, last season was known as Stal Makiivka

== Higher League ==
=== League table ===
Pos	Team	Pld	W	D	L	GF	GA	GD	Pts	Qualification or relegation
1	Alina Kyiv	16	13	0	3	27	9	+18	39	Champions
2	Lehenda-Cheksil Chernihiv	16	11	2	3	26	9	+17	35	
3	Donchanka-Varna Donetsk	16	9	2	5	24	8	+16	29	
4	Stal-Nika-MMK Makiivka	16	3	1	12	8	24	−16	10	
5	Hrafit Zaporizhia	16	1	1	14	2	37	−35	4	

Source: WFPL.ua
