= Oleksandr Chubarov =

Professional Ukrainian football coach

Personal information
- Full name: Oleksandr Fedorovych Chubarov
- Date of birth: 28 April 1943
- Place of birth: Uzyn, Reichskommissariat Ukraine
- Date of death: 18 May 2021 (aged 78)
- Place of death: Kyiv, Ukraine
- Position: Defender

Youth career
- DYuSSh SKA Kiev

Senior career*
Years	Team	Apps	(Gls)
1966	Dniprovets Dniprodzerzhynsk	13	(0)
1966	Shakhtar Krasnyi Luch	3	(0)
1968–1969	Stroitel Rudny		(1)
1972	Bilshovyk Kyiv		

Managerial career
- 1980s: DYuFSh Dynamo Kyiv
- 1989–1991: Dynamo Kyiv (administrator)
- 1992–1994: Dynamo Kyiv (women)
- 1992–1994: Ukraine (women)
- 1990s: Dynamo Kyiv (administrator)
- * Club domestic league appearances and goals

Oleksandr Fedorovych Chubarov (Ukrainian: Олександр Федорович Чубаров; 28 April 1943 – 18 May 2021) was a professional Ukrainian football coach and for a long time was the Dynamo Kyiv first team administrator.

In 1990s he served as a head coach of the Ukraine women's national football team.

The Russian footballer Sergei Yuran is his son-in-law.
