= WFC Luhanochka Luhansk =

- Full name: Luhanochka Luhansk
- Founded: 1987
- Ground: Luhansk
- League: Ukrainian Women's League

WFC Luhanochka Luhansk was a Soviet and Ukrainian women's football club from Luhansk.

== History ==
The club was formed on 2 December 1987 in Luhansk at the "Avanhard" factory of sports equipment. It played its first game on 10 April 1988 against Trudovi Rezervy Rovenky. Later the same year Luhanochka took part in several minor football tournaments.

In 1989 it participated in the Soviet championship among teams of trade unions which is considered to be unofficially the first Soviet league competition. In November 1989 the club was officially formed. In 1990 Luhanochka was admitted to the Soviet First League for women and won a promotion.

Following dissolution of the Soviet Union, in 1992 it was admitted to the Ukrainian Women's League and placed in Vyshcha Liha (Higher League). Due to financial hardship the Soviet club ceased its operations already in 1994. It was again revived as Ukrainian in 2001 and with some breaks it competed in the Ukrainian Women's League to the end of 2000s and again was disbanded.

Once again it was revived in 2013 as a futsal team and in 2016 it returned to the big football competing in the second tier (Persha Liha/First League). In 2020 the club was disbanded once again.

== Presidents ==
- 1987–1994 Mykola Nikishin (president and manager)
