= Soviet Union women's national football team =

National association football team

Soviet Union
- Association: Football Federation of the Soviet Union
- Home stadium: Various
- FIFA code: URS
First colours	Second colours

First international
- Bulgaria 1–4 Soviet Union (Kazanlak, Bulgaria; 26 March 1990); Last international Soviet Union 2–1 Hungary (Soviet Union; 6 October 1991)

Biggest win
- Bulgaria 1–4 Soviet Union (Kazanlak, Bulgaria; 26 March 1990)

Biggest defeat
- United States 8–0 Soviet Union (Blaine, Minnesota, USA; 5 August 1990)

The USSR women's national football team (Russian: Женская сборная СССР по футболу, romanized: Zhyenskaya sbornaya SSSR po futbolu) represented the Soviet Union in international women's football. The team was controlled by the Football Federation of the Soviet Union. It was founded in 1990, so it was a short-lived national team due to the dissolution of the Soviet Union the following year. Oleg Lapshin served as the team's coach during its 20 months of existence. Socially conservative views in the Soviet Union negatively affected the development of women's football in the country.

== Background ==
Following a letter published in 1972 in the magazine journal Zdorovye complaining about a women's football tournament being held in Dnipropetrovsk, Nina Graevskaya, head of the USSR Federation of Sports Medicine, replied that holding such competitions was inexpedient, arguing that playing football posed a danger to the female body because of the size of its heart, bones and pelvis and its spine and joint's degree of mobility. One month later the State Committee for Physical Culture and Sport issued a ban on women's football, along with women's boxing and wrestling.

== History ==
The Soviet team played its first match on 26 March 1990 against Bulgaria in Kazanlak. A. Bezmenova, Tatyana Verezubova and Irina Gnutova made it a 4–1 win. Two weeks later they played their first match on Soviet soil, a 0–0 draw against Norway in Sevastopol. The Soviet women's national team didn't take part in the 1991 UEFA Women's Championship qualification, instead playing friendly matches.

The USSR was accepted for the 1993 UEFA Women's Championship, which would have marked its first appearance in an official women's football tournament. The Soviet national team played its only official game on 6 October 1991, a 2–1 win over Hungary. They would play their final match a month before their next qualification game, ending their short existence with a balance of 9 wins, 9 draws and 21 losses. The second qualification game was played in May 1992 after the break-up of the USSR Football Federation, with the debuting Russia women's national team representing the new Russia.

== See also ==
- Soviet Union national football team
- Armenia women's national football team
- Azerbaijan women's national football team
- Belarus women's national football team
- Estonia women's national football team
- Georgia women's national football team
- Kazakhstan women's national football team
- Kyrgyzstan women's national football team
- Latvia women's national football team
- Lithuania women's national football team
- Moldova women's national football team
- Russia women's national football team
- Tajikistan women's national football team
- Turkmenistan women's national football team
- Ukraine women's national football team
- Uzbekistan women's national football team
