= CSK ZSU Stadium =

Multi-use stadium in Kyiv, Ukraine

Coordinates: 50°26′41″N 30°28′42″E

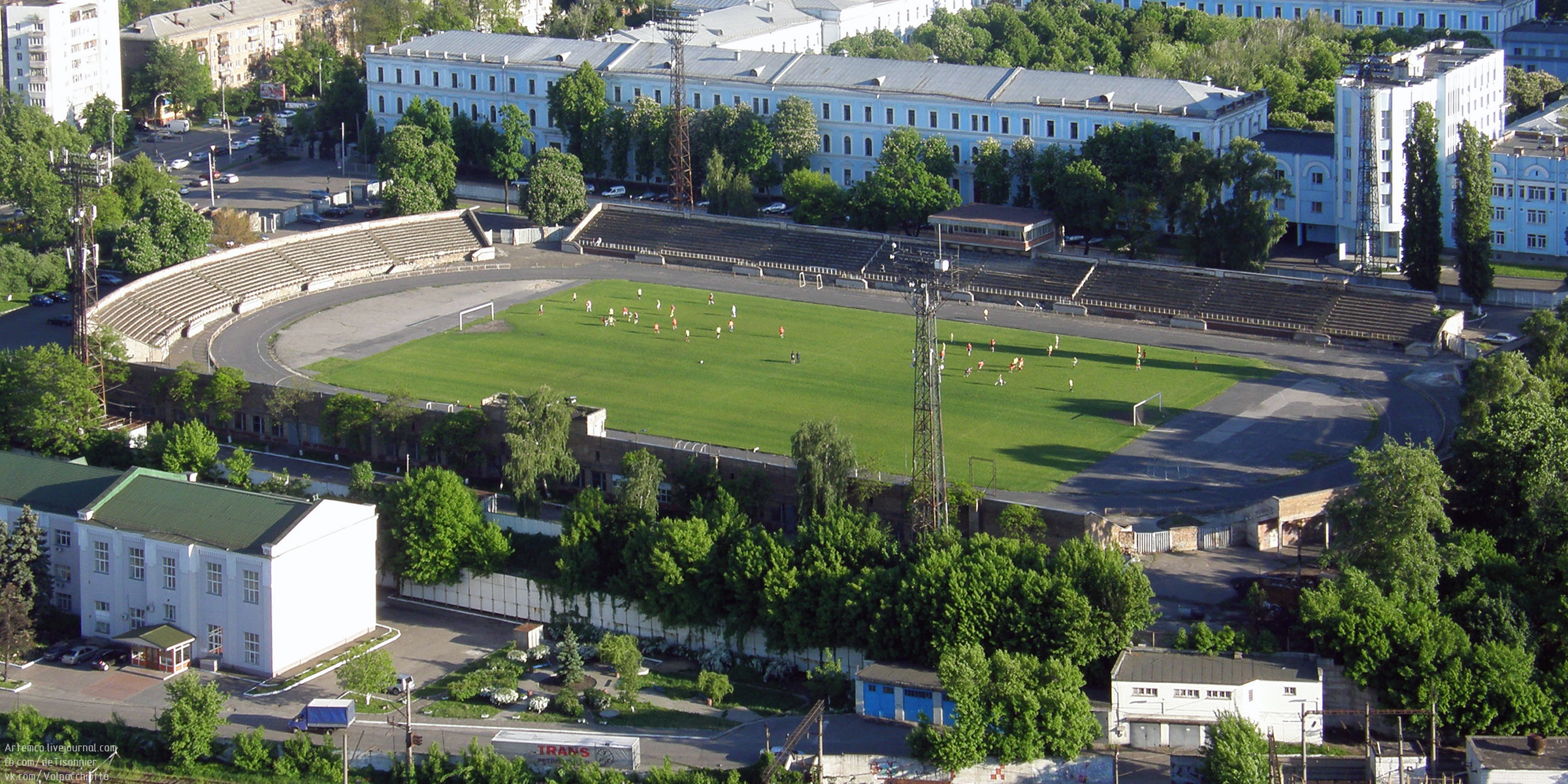
- Interactive map of CSK ZSU Stadium
- Former names: SKA Stadium
- Location: Solomianka Raion, Kyiv, Ukraine
- Owner: Ministry of Defense (Ukraine) Sports Committee
- Operator: Central Sports Club of the Armed Forces of Ukraine
- Capacity: 12,000 (football)
- Surface: Grass
- Field size: 104 m × 69 m (341 ft × 226 ft)

Construction
- Opened: 1967

Tenants
- FC CSKA Kyiv; FC Arsenal Kyiv academy

CSK ZSU Stadium (Ukrainian: Стадіон ЦСК ЗСУ) is a multi-use stadium in Kyiv, Ukraine.

It is often used for football matches and was the home of FC CSKA Kyiv. The stadium holds 12,000 spectators and it opened in 1967. It is located next to the headquarters of the Ministry of Defense. The stadium is part of a bigger complex that also includes a swimming pool, athletic hall, and an area for summer cinema theater (outdoor cinema, currently inoperational). The stadium is also closely located to the city's main train station Kyiv Passenger.

In the close vicinity there is the Lokomotyv sports complex.

== Gallery ==
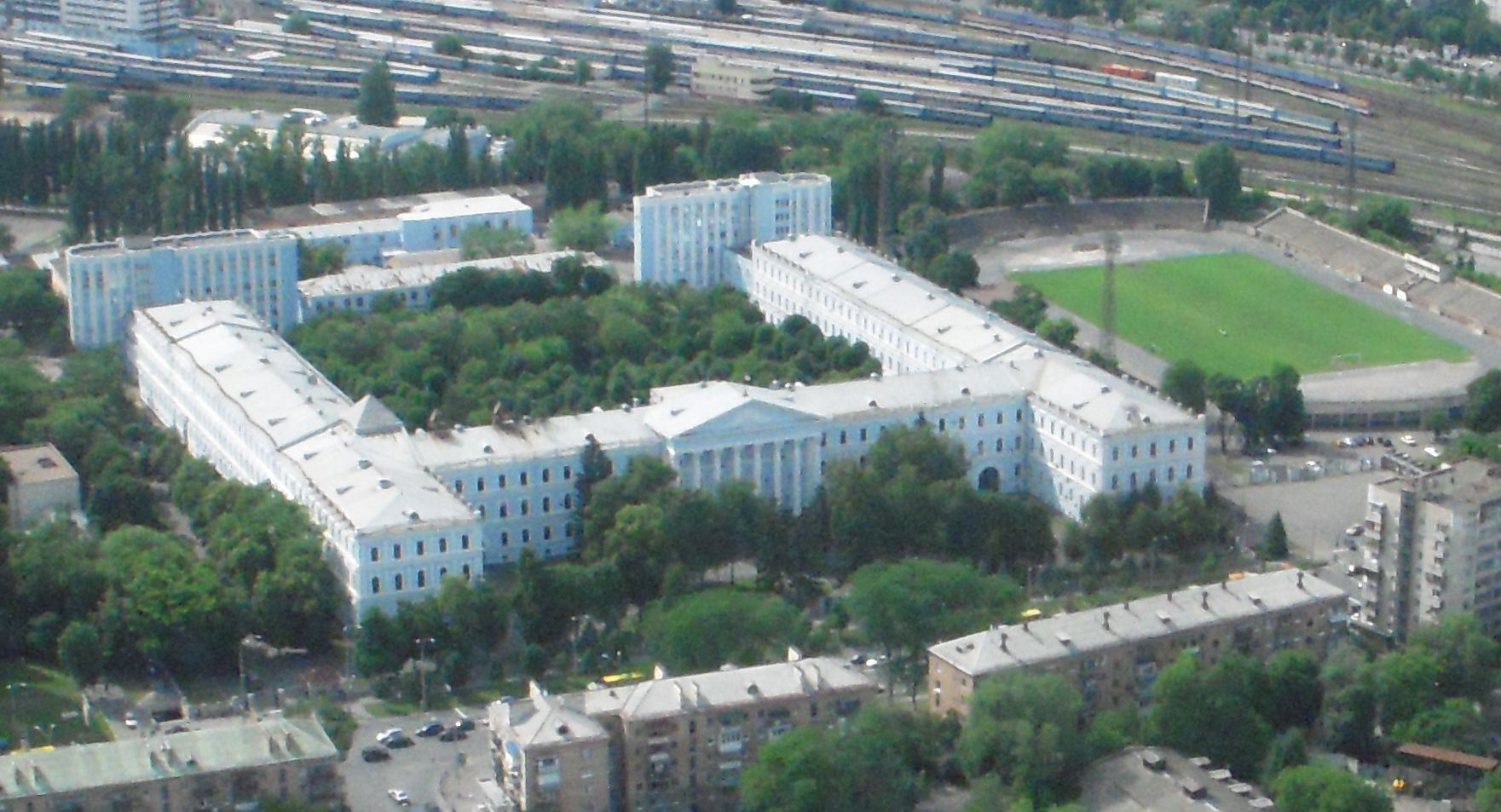
CSK ZSU Stadium is next to the Ministry of Defence building.

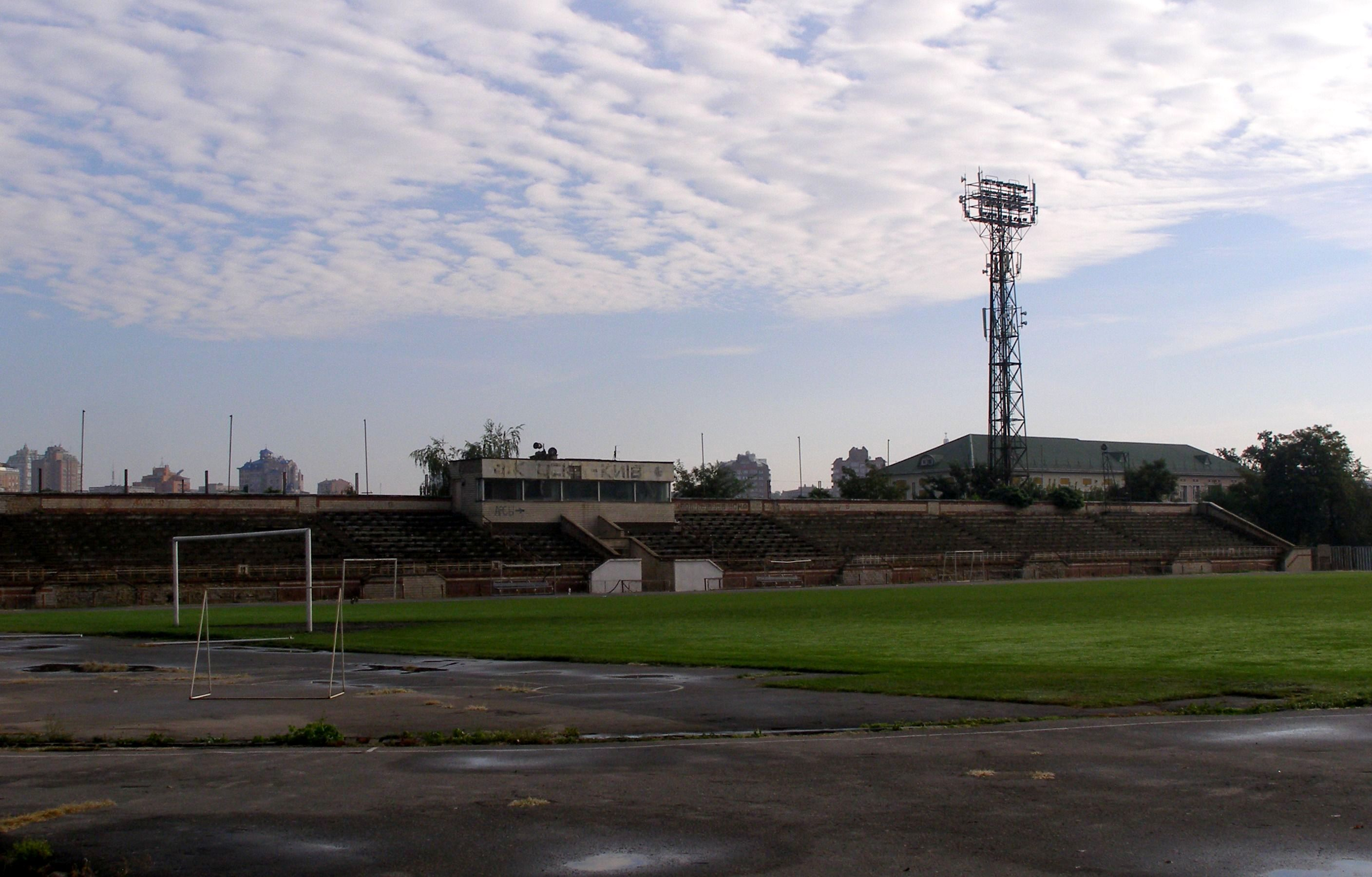
CSK ZSU Stadium
