= Ukrainian Women's Cup =

Кубок України з футболу серед жінок
- Founded: 1992
- Region: Ukraine
- Teams: 25
- Current champions: Metalist 1925 Kharkiv
- Most championships: Metalist 1925 Kharkiv (Zhytlobud-1, 12 titles)
- Website: The UAF section for women's and girls' football (in Ukrainian)
- 2026–27 Ukrainian Women's Cup

The Ukrainian Women’s Cup competition (Ukrainian: Кубок України серед жіночих команд) is a knockout cup competition for women's football clubs in Ukraine, run by the Ukrainian Association of Football (formerly Football Federation of Ukraine). The competition is the main annual cup competition in Ukraine for women's clubs. Like most other football competitions for women in the country, it is handled by the UAF section for women's and girls' football.

== Format ==
The format of this competition fluctuates annually. Mainly, the competition is limited to the professional-level clubs.

== History ==
The first cup competition was held in 1992. The winner was Dynamo Kyiv, who also won the national league that year.

Starting from 1996 to 2011, the cup consisted of only a few matches due to a lack of participants. In 2002 and 2008, the tournament consisted of a single match, the final. In 2000, the competition was scratched completely.

In 2017, the tournament was suspended due to transitioning to a fall-spring calendar (from spring-fall). In 2022, the Ukrainian Women's Cup was suspended due to the Russian aggression, and the 2021–22 season was finished during the next season. Due to uncertainty, the 2023 season started late and ended very quickly (August through November).

== Number of participants ==
| Season | 92 | 93 | 94 | 95 | 96 | 97 | 98 | 99 | 00 | 01 | 02 | 03 | 04 | 05 | 06 | 07 | 08 | 09 | 10 | 11 | 12 | 13 | 14 | 15 | 16 | 17/18 | 18/19 | 19/20 | 20/21 | 21/22 | 23 | 24/25 | 25/26 |
| Teams | 19 | 18 | 14 | 9 | 4 | 4 | 4 | 4 | X | 4 | 2 | 6 | 8 | 6 | 7 | 4 | 2 | 7 | 7 | 8 | 10 | 16 | 4 | 7 | 8 | 12 | 14 | 16 | 8 | 16 | 16 | 12 | 25 |

== Cup finals ==
The following is a list of all cup finals. The finals are played in a single leg. The only exception has been the first 1992 final which was contested over two legs.

| Year | Venue | Winner | Score | Runner-up |
|---|---|---|---|---|
| 1992 | 10 October 1992; Fastiv – Stadion "Mashynobudivnyk"; Attendance: 1,000 | Dynamo Kyiv | 1–0 | Arena-Hospodar Fastiv |
| 1992 | 17 October 1992; Kyiv – Stadion "Dynamo"; Attendance: 2,000 | Dynamo Kyiv (1) | 0–0 | Arena-Hospodar Fastiv |
| 1993 | 11 August 1993; Kyiv – Stadion "Dynamo"; Attendance: 1,000 | Arena Kyiv (1) | 4–1 | Dynamo Kyiv |
| 1994 | 22 October 1994; Kyiv – Respublikasnkyi stadion Attendance: 1,000 | Donetsk (1) | 1–1 (5–4 p) | Alina Kyiv |
| 1995 | 13 October 1995; Kyiv – Verkhnye pole Respublikanskoho stadionu Attendance: 300 | Alina Kyiv (1) | 2–1 | Donetsk-Ros |
| 1996 | 12 October 1996; Kyiv – Respublikasnkyi stadion Attendance: 500 | Varna Donetsk (2) | 7–1 | Alina Kyiv |
| 1997 | 23 October 1997; Kyiv – Stadion CSK ZSU; Attendance: 300 | Alina Kyiv (2) | 1–0 | Donchanka Donetsk |
| 1998 | 3 October 1998; Kyiv – Stadion CSK ZSU; Attendance: 200 | Donchanka Donetsk (3) | 1–1 (4–3 p) | Lehenda Chernihiv |
| 1999 | 3 October 1999; Kyiv – Stadion CSK ZSU; Attendance: 1,000 | Donchanka Donetsk (4) | 3–2 | Lehenda-Cheksyl Chernihiv |
| 2000 | no competition | | | |
| 2001 | 18 November 2001; Kyiv – Verkhnye pole Respublikanskoho stadionu Attendance: 100 | Lehenda Chernihiv (1) | 4–1 | Donchanka Donetsk |
| 2002 | 30 October 2002; Kyiv – Stadion CSK ZSU; Attendance: 300 | Lehenda Chernihiv (2) | 7–6 (a.e.t.) | Kharkiv |
| 2003 | 31 August 2003; Kyiv – Stadion CSK ZSU; Attendance: 200 | Kharkiv-Kondytsioner (1) | 2–1 | Lehenda Chernihiv |
| 2004 | 22 October 2004; Kyiv – Stadion CSK ZSU; Attendance: 300 | Metalist Kharkiv (2) | 3–1 | Lehenda Chernihiv |
| 2005 | 16 November 2005; Kyiv – Stadion imeni Bannikova; Attendance: 400 | Lehenda Chernihiv (3) | 1–1 (3–2 p) | Arsenal Kharkiv |
| 2006 | 24 November 2006; Kyiv – Stadion imeni Bannikova; Attendance: 300 | Zhytlobud-1 Kharkiv (1) | 2–0 | Lehenda Chernihiv |
| 2007 | 10 November 2007; Kyiv – Stadion imeni Bannikova; Attendance: 300 | Zhytlobud-1 Kharkiv (2) | 5–4 | Lehenda Chernihiv |
| 2008 | 6 December 2008; Kyiv – Stadion imeni Bannikova; Attendance: 200 | Zhytlobud-1 Kharkiv (3) | 2–1 | Lehenda Chernihiv |
| 2009 | 15 July 2009; Kyiv – Stadion imeni Bannikova; Attendance: 500 | Lehenda Chernihiv (4) | 1–0 (a.e.t.) | Zhytlobud-1 Kharkiv |
| 2010 | 28 July 2010; Sumy – Stadion "Yuvileiny"; Attendance: 1,600 | Zhytlobud-1 Kharkiv (4) | 3–2 | Lehenda Chernihiv |
| 2011 | 23 July 2011; Kyiv – Viktor Bannikov Stadium; Attendance: 1,100 | Zhytlobud-1 Kharkiv (5) | 1–1 (4–3 p) | Lehenda Chernihiv |
| 2012 | 29 September 2012; Kyiv – Stadion imeni Bannikova; Attendance: 780 | Naftokhimik Kalush (1) | 7–0 | Donchanka-TsPOR Donetsk |
| 2013 | 24 October 2013; Kyiv – Stadion imeni Bannikova; Attendance: 300 | Zhytlobud-1 Kharkiv (6) | 3–0 | Lehenda Chernihiv |
| 2014 | 5 November 2014; Kyiv – Stadion imeni Bannikova; Attendance: 250 | Zhytlobud-1 Kharkiv (7) | 4–2 | Lehenda Chernihiv |
| 2015 | 20 August 2015; Kyiv – Stadion imeni Bannikova; Attendance: 150 | Zhytlobud-1 Kharkiv (8) | 4–0 | Lehenda-ShVSM Chernihiv |
| 2016 | 8 October 2016; Ternopil – Ternopilskyi miskyi stadion Attendance: 860 | Zhytlobud-1 Kharkiv (9) | 4–1 | Lehenda-ShVSM Chernihiv |
| 2017 | no competition | | | |
| 2017–18 | 2 June 2018; Ternopil – Miskyi stadion imeni Shukhevycha; Attendance: 1,560 | Zhytlobud-1 Kharkiv (10) | 8–0 | Lehenda-ShVSM Chernihiv |
| 2018–19 | 8 June 2019; Lviv – Stadion "SKIF"; Attendance: 600 | Zhytlobud-1 Kharkiv (11) | 2–0; Report | Voskhod Stara Mayachka |
| 2019–20 | 30 September 2020; Kharkiv – Stadion "Sonyachny"; Attendance: 0 | Zhytlobud-2 Kharkiv (1) | 1–0; Report | Voskhod Stara Mayachka |
| 2020–21 | 5 June 2021; Kyiv – Stadion imeni Bannikova; Attendance: 350 | Zhytlobud-2 Kharkiv (2) | 1–0 | Zhytlobud-1 Kharkiv |
| 2021–22 | 2 December 2022; Kyiv – Stadion "Livyi Bereh"; Attendance: 0 | Vorskla Poltava (3) | 2–0 | Kolos Kovalivka |
| 2023 | 25 November 2023; Lviv – Stadion "SKIF"; Attendance: 0 | Vorskla Poltava (4) | 2–0 | Kryvbas Kryvyi Rih |
| 2024–25 | 10 June 2025; Rivne – Stadion "Avanhard"; Attendance: 600 | Vorskla Poltava (5) | 1–0 | Metalist 1925 Kharkiv |
| 2025–26 | 27 May 2026; Kyiv – Stadion imeni Bannikova; Attendance:198 | Metalist 1925 Kharkiv (12) | 1–0 | Kolos Kovalivka |

== Performances ==
Achievements of clubs since 1992

| Team | Winners | Runners-up | Finals | Winning years |
|---|---|---|---|---|
| Metalist 1925 Kharkiv (Zhytlobud-1) | 12 | 3 | 15 | 2006, 2007, 2008, 2010, 2011, 2013, 2014, 2015, 2016, 2017–18, 2018–19, 2025–26 |
| Vorskla Poltava (Zhytlobud-2) | 5 | | 5 | 2019–20, 2020–21, 2021–22, 2023, 2024–25 |
| Lehenda Chernihiv | 4 | 14 | 18 | 2001, 2002, 2005, 2009 |
| Donchanka Donetsk | 4 | 4 | 8 | 1994, 1996, 1998, 1999 |
| Alina Kyiv | 2 | 2 | 4 | 1995, 1997 |
| Metalist Kharkiv | 2 | 2 | 4 | 2003, 2004 |
| Dynamo Kyiv | 1 | 1 | 2 | 1992 |
| Arena Kyiv | 1 | 1 | 2 | 1993 |
| Naftokhimik Kalush | 1 | | 1 | 2012 |
| Voskhod Stara Mayachka | | 2 | 2 | |
| Kolos Kovalivka | | 2 | 2 | |
| Kryvbas Kryvyi Rih | | 1 | 1 | |

== Finals held at stadiums ==
- 14 – Stadion imeni Bannikova (Verkhnye pole), Kyiv
- 6 – Stadion CSK ZSU, Kyiv
- 2 – Stadion Dynamo, Kyiv
- 2 – Olympiyskiy NSC (Respublikanskyi), Kyiv
- 2 – Miskyi stadion imeni Shukhevycha (Ternopilskyi miskyi), Ternopil
- 2 – Stadion "SKIF", Lviv
- 1 – Stadion "Mashynobudivnyk", Fastiv
- 1 – Stadion "Yuvileinyi", Sumy
- 1 – Stadion "Sonyachnyi", Kharkiv
- 1 – Stadion "Livyi Bereh", Kyiv
- 1 – Stadion "Avanhard", Rivne

== See also ==
- Football in Ukraine
- Ukrainian Women's League
