= Soviet women's football championship =

- Founded: 1990
- Folded: 1991
- Country: Soviet Union
- Confederation: UEFA
- Divisions: 3 tiers (with groups)
- Number of clubs: 24
- Level on pyramid: 1–3
- Domestic cup: Soviet Women's Cup
- Last champions: Tekstilschik Ramenskoye (1st title) (1991)
- Most championships: Tekstilschik Ramenskoye and Nyva Baryshivka (1 titles)

The Soviet women's football championship were competitions among women's football teams in the late Soviet Union and were conducted by the Football Federation of the Soviet Union. The championship consisted of three tiers (Higher, First and Second leagues) with each having two or more groups.

Football competitions among women were conducted before, but in 1990 an official championship was established. In 1989, there took place competitions among teams of trade unions involving some 60 teams. After two seasons the championship was discontinued due to the dissolution of the Soviet Union. Most of the Russia-based clubs formed the new Russian Women's Football Championship; clubs based in former Soviet republics based in Europe formed their own leagues, while those in Central Asia either dissolved or moved to Russia, as local federations did not allow women's football for many years, or none at all to date.

== Champions ==
Year	Tier	Winner	Runner Up	Third	No. of teams
1990	Higher	Nyva Baryshivka (UkSSR)	Serp I Molot Moscow (Note: a factory team of the Moscow Metallurgical Plant, in 1996 merged with Tekstilschik Ramenskoye) (RSFSR)	Tekstilschik Ramenskoye (RSFSR)	24
1990	First	Dnipro Dnipropetrovsk (UkSSR)	Viktoriya Kashira (RSFSR)	Araz Baku (AzSSR) Nig Aparan (ArSSR)	24
1990	Second	Bukovinka Chernovtsy (UkSSR)	Chernomorochka Odessa (UkSSR)	Lada Togliatti (RSFSR)	20
1991	Higher	Tekstilschik Ramenskoye (RSFSR)	Nadezhda Mahilyow (BSSR)	SKIF Malakhovka (RSFSR)	24
1991	First	Energiya Voronezh (RSFSR)	Spartak-13 Moscow (RSFSR)	CSKA-Transexpo Moscow (RSFSR)	32
1991	Second	Rus Moscow (RSFSR)	Syuyumbike Zelenodolsk (RSFSR)	Kaluzhanka Kaluga (RSFSR)	18

== See also ==
- Russian Women's Football Championship, successor.
