= Ukrainian Women's Higher League =

- Founded: 1992
- Country: Ukraine
- Confederation: UEFA
- Divisions: 1
- Number of clubs: 8
- Level on pyramid: 1 (1992–2026); 2 (2026–)
- Promotion to: Prime League
- Relegation to: First League
- Domestic cup: Ukrainian Women's Cup
- Current champions: Metalist 1925 Kharkiv (11th title) (2025–26)
- Most championships: Metalist 1925 Kharkiv (11 titles)
- Top scorer: Yana Kalinina (240 goals)
- Website: Official website
- Current: 2026–27 Ukrainian Women's Higher League

The Ukrainian Women's Higher League (Vyshcha Liha) (Ukrainian: Чемпіонат України. Вища ліга) is a second-tier women's association football competition in the Ukrainian Women's Football Championship. Starting with the 2026–27 season, the women's national football competitions consist of three tiers: the Elite League, the Higher League (Vyshcha Liha), and the First League (Persha Liha), with the First considered amateur (non-professional). The Ukrainian Association of Football (UAF) department of women's and girls' football organizes the competitions.

The top teams of the Top (Higher) League qualify for the UEFA women's competitions. Since 2015, the league has been dominated by Metalist 1925 Kharkiv, which holds the record for the most titles.

== History ==
The league was created in 1992 with the dissolution of the Soviet Union and the discontinuation of the Soviet women's football championship, which existed for two seasons, 1990 and 1991 (the Soviet Trade Union Sport Federation organized the 1989 season). The new Ukrainian league included several teams that participated in the former Soviet championship, such as Lehenda Chernihiv, Arena Kyiv, Olimp Kyiv (former Soviet champion Nyva Baryshivka), Dynamo Kyiv, ZHU Zaporizhzhia, Luhanochka Luhansk, Dnipro Dnipropetrovsk, and many others. Kharkiv city teams en masse boycotted the domestic league until the introduction of the UEFA Women's Cup.

The first Ukrainian championship consisted of 18 teams that were split into two divisions, the Higher League (10 teams) and the First League (8 teams). The first Ukrainian championship presented a new Donetsk team (as Tekstylnyk Donetsk) that started from the First League and eventually would become one of the most successful clubs in the league. While dominated at first by various teams from Kyiv, starting from 1994 Donchanka (Donechanka) Donetsk became the flagman (flag-woman) of the league, dominating until the end of the 1990s.

Some six teams that previously competed in Soviet competitions (in 1990 and 1991) chose not to enter the new Ukrainian league in 1992. More teams withdrew from competitions after 1993, causing the second tier (First League) to be disbanded for the next 20 years. The interest in women's football never improved in Ukraine, and by the end of the 1990s the league consisted of merely 4 teams playing a 4 or 6-leg round-robin tournament between each other.

With the turn of the millennium, the leadership in the league was overtaken by WFC Lehenda Chernihiv and stayed the leading team for the next decade. Around that time (2001), there was introduced new international tournament, UEFA Women's Cup that gave a boost to the expansion of the Ukrainian league. For the first time in the league, a team from Kharkiv appeared. Later, the team,, at first existing as a department of the main Metalist club, in 2006 was taken over by a local construction company. While the main Donetsk team declined, Chernihiv footballers received a notable competitiveness boost from Kharkiv, Prykarpattia and Azov regions. There also appeared new smaller teams such as Rodyna out of Kostopil in Volhynia and eastern Podollia teams around Uman. In 2008, a winter break competition was held, which became regular later since 2013.

Following 2010, Lehenda was not able to regain the first position in the league, and the league became dominated by Zhilstroi-1 (Zhytlobud-1) Kharkiv.

== Clubs ==
The following eleven clubs compete in the 2026–27 season.

Team	Location	Ground	Capacity	2020–21 season
DIuSSh 1	Khmelnytskyi	Podillya	6,800	1L, 3rd ("A")
EMS-Podillia	Vinnytsia	PCY Stadium	1,500	10th
SDIuShOR Iunist	Chernihiv	Iunist	3,000	1L, 3rd ("B")
Mariupol	Sofiivska Borshchahivka, Kyiv Oblast	Sofiyivskyi	?	1L, 1st ("B")
Podil	Kyiv	Podil Arena	743	1L, 2nd ("B")
Pohoryna	Kostopil, Rivne Oblast	Kolos	1,330	1L, 2nd ("A")
Uzhhorod	Uzhhorod	Mynai	1,312	1L, 1st ("A")

Locations of teams in the 2026–27 Ukrainian Championship Higher League

== Higher League (Vyshcha Liha) laureates ==
The following is a list of all previous champions.

- ‡ – winners of the National Cup for women's teams
- in **bold** winners of the Double (championship and cup)

Season	Champion	Runner-up	3rd Position	Winter champion	# of teams
1st tier competition
1992	**Dynamo Kyiv** (1) ‡	Arena-Hospodar Fastiv	Lehenda Chernihiv	–	10
1993	**Arena Kyiv** (1) ‡	Dynamo Kyiv	Tornado Kyiv	–	13
1994	**Donetsk-Ros' Donetsk** (1) ‡	Yunisa Kyiv	Alina Kyiv	–	13
1995	Donetsk-Ros' Donetsk (2)	Alina Kyiv ‡	Spartak Kyiv	–	9
1996	**Donetsk-Ros' Donetsk** (3) ‡	Alina Kyiv	Stal Makiyivka	–	6
1997	**Alina Kyiv** (1) ‡	Lehenda Chernihiv	Donchanka-Varna Donetsk	–	5
1998	**WFC Donchanka** (4) ‡	Lehenda Chernihiv	Iskra Zaporizhzhia	–	4
1999	**WFC Donchanka** (5) ‡	Lehenda Chernihiv	Hrafit Zaporizhzhia	–	4
2000	Lehenda Chernihiv (1)	WFC Donchanka	Kyivska Rus' Kyiv	–	8
2001	**Lehenda Chernihiv** (2) ‡	WFC Donchanka	Volyn Lutsk	–	8
2002	**Lehenda Chernihiv** (3) ‡	WFC Kharkiv	Metallurg-Donchanka Donetsk	–	8
2003	**Kharkiv-Kondytsioner** (1) ‡	Lehenda Chernihiv	Donchanka-TSPOR Donetsk	–	7
2004	**Metalist Kharkiv** (2) ‡	Lehenda Chernihiv	Spartak Sumy	–	9
2005	**Lehenda Chernihiv** (4) ‡	Arsenal Kharkiv	Spartak Ivano-Frankivsk	–	9
2006	**Zhytlobud-1 Kharkiv** (1) ‡	Lehenda Chernihiv	Naftokhimik Kalush	–	9
2007	Naftokhimik Kalush (1)	Zhytlobud-1 Kharkiv ‡	Lehenda Chernihiv	–	8
2008	**Zhytlobud-1 Kharkiv** (2) ‡	Lehenda Chernihiv	Naftokhimik Kalush	Zhytlobud-1 Kharkiv (1)	10
2009	**Lehenda Chernihiv** (5) ‡	Zhytlobud-1 Kharkiv	Illichivka Mariupol	–	7
2010	Lehenda Chernihiv (6)	Zhytlobud-1 Kharkiv ‡	Illichivka Mariupol	–	9
2011	**Zhytlobud-1 Kharkiv** (3) ‡	Lehenda Chernihiv	Naftokhimik Kalush	–	8
2012	Zhytlobud-1 Kharkiv (4)	Naftokhimik Kalush ‡	Donchanka-TsPOR	–	8
2013	**Zhytlobud-1 Kharkiv** (5) ‡	Lehenda Chernihiv	Donchanka-TsPOR	Lehenda Chernihiv (1)	8
2014	**Zhytlobud-1 Kharkiv** (6) ‡	Zhytlobud-2 Kharkiv	Lehenda Chernihiv	Zhytlobud-1 Kharkiv (2)	8
2015	**Zhytlobud-1 Kharkiv** (7) ‡	Lehenda Chernihiv	Zhytlobud-2 Kharkiv	Zhytlobud-1 Kharkiv (3)	8
2016	Zhytlobud-2 Kharkiv (1)	Zhytlobud-1 Kharkiv ‡	Lehenda Chernihiv	Zhytlobud-2 Kharkiv (1)	7
2017	Zhytlobud-2 Kharkiv (2)	Zhytlobud-1 Kharkiv	Lehenda Chernihiv	Zhytlobud-1 Kharkiv (4)	9
2017–18	**Zhytlobud-1 Kharkiv** (8) ‡	Zhytlobud-2 Kharkiv	Lehenda Chernihiv	Zhytlobud-2 Kharkiv (2)	10
2018–19	**Zhytlobud-1 Kharkiv** (9) ‡	Zhytlobud-2 Kharkiv	Voskhod Stara Mayachka	Zhytlobud-2 Kharkiv (3)	10
2019–20	**Zhytlobud-2 Kharkiv** (3) ‡	Zhytlobud-1 Kharkiv	Voskhod Stara Mayachka	Zhytlobud-1 Kharkiv (5)	10
2020–21	Zhytlobud-1 Kharkiv (10)	Zhytlobud-2 Kharkiv ‡	Voskhod Stara Mayachka	Zhytlobud-2 Kharkiv (4)	10
2021–22*	Zhytlobud-2 Kharkiv ‡	Zhytlobud-1 Kharkiv	Kryvbas Kryvyi Rih	cancelled	11
2022–23	Vorskla Poltava (4)	Kryvbas Kryvyi Rih	Kolos Kovalivka	–	12
2023–24	**Vorskla Poltava** (5) ‡	Kolos Kovalivka	Kryvbas Kryvyi Rih	–	12
2024–25	**Vorskla Poltava** (6)	Metalist 1925 Kharkiv	Kolos Kovalivka	–	11
2025–26	Metalist 1925 Kharkiv (11)	Seasters Odesa	Vorskla Poltava	–	10
2nd tier competition
2026–27				–	7

- The 2021–22 season was abandoned midway due to Russian aggression, and no end-season awards were given out. However, Zhytloud-2 Kharkiv did win the National Cup which was resumed later and won by the Zhytlobud-2 successor Vorskla.

=== Record champions ===
Club	Winners	Winning years	Runners-up	2nd place years
Metalist 1925 Kharkiv (Zhytlobud-1)	11	2006, 2008, 2011, 2012, 2013, 2014, 2015, 2017–18, 2018–19, 2020–21, 2025–26	6	2007, 2010, 2016, 2017, 2019–20, (~~2021–22~~), 2024–25
Lehenda Chernihiv	6	2000, 2001, 2002, 2005, 2009, 2010	10	1997, 1998, 1999, 2003, 2004, 2006, 2008, 2011, 2013, 2015
Vorskla Poltava (Zhytlobud-2)	6	2016, 2017, 2019–20, (~~2021–22~~), 2022-23, 2023-24, 2024–25	4	2014, 2017–18, 2018–19, 2020–21
Donchanka Donetsk	5	1994, 1995, 1996, 1998, 1999	1	2000
Metalist Kharkiv	2	2003, 2004	2	2002, 2005
Alina Kyiv	1	1997	2	1995, 1996
Dynamo Kyiv	1	1992	1	1993
Arena Kyiv	1	1993	1	1992
Naftokhimik Kalush	1	2007	1	2012
Unisa Luhansk	–		1	1994
Kyyivska Rus Kyiv	–		1	2001
Illichivka Mariupol	–		1	2009
Kryvbas Kryvyi Rih	–		1	2022–23
Kolos Kovalivka	–		1	2023–24
Seasters Odesa	–		1	2025–26
Total	34		34	

== Ukraine Women's Higher League players ==
All-time Higher League appearance leaders
**Rank**	**Player**	**Games**
1	(Ukraine) Tetyana Hromovska	240
2	(Ukraine) Yuliya Vashchenko	208
3	(Ukraine) Nataliya Zhdanova	188
4	(Ukraine) Tetyana Oznobikhina	184
5	(Ukraine) Anzhela Chernobay	182
6	(Ukraine) Natalia Sukhorukova	180
7	(Ukraine) Nataliya Ihnatovych	178
8	(Ukraine) Halyna Mykhaylenko	177
9	(Ukraine) Inesa Titova	159
10	(Ukraine) Oksana Revzin	157
Players **in bold** are still playing in Premier League; Data as of 23 April 2012

All-time Higher League scorers
**Rank**	**Player**	**Goals**
1	(Ukraine) Halyna Mykhaylenko	137
2	(Ukraine) Yuliya Korniyevets	121
3	(Ukraine) Svitlana Frishko	115
4	(Ukraine) Olena Khodyryeva	87
5	(Ukraine) Hanna Mozolska	77
6	(Ukraine) Lyudmyla Pekur	75
7	(Ukraine) Khrystyna Botyuk	64
8	(Ukraine) Vira Dyatel	59
9	(Ukraine) Olha Boychenko	50
10	(Belarus) Hanna Tatarynava	48
Players **in bold** are still playing in Premier League; Data as of 23 April 2012

== All-time table ==
at the end of the 2025–26 season

Rank	Team	Seasons	P	W	D	L	GF	GA	Pts	Achievement	Other names used
1	Metalist 1925 Kharkiv	20	316	258	36	22	1405	144	810	champions (11)	Zhytlobud-1
2	Lehenda-ShVSM Chernihiv	27	370	241	46	83	1188	304	769	champions (6)	Lehenda-Cheksil
3	Vorskla Poltava	15	243	189	20	34	1076	215	587	champions (6)	Zhytlobud-2 Kharkiv
4	Donchanka Donetsk	23	292	164	41	87	746	328	533	champions (5)	Donchanka-TsPOR, Metalurh-Donchanka, Donchanka-Varna, Varna, FC Donetsk, Donetsk-Ros, Tekstylnyk
5	Naftokhimik Kalush	8	120	69	15	36	282	151	222	champions (1)	Spartak Ivano-Frankivsk
6	Dynamo Kyiv	5	100	62	13	25	238	95	199	champions (1)	OKIP Kyiv, SDYuShOR-16 Kyiv
7	Kolos Kovalivka	5	99	60	10	29	216	86	190	2nd (1)	
8	Ladomyr Volodymyr	9	172	56	17	99	287	422	185	4th (1)	
9	Kryvbas Kryvyi Rih	5	97	56	10	31	267	134	178	2nd (1)	
10	Pantery Uman	11	186	53	19	114	237	567	178	5th (2)	
11	Pohoryna Kostopil	18	255	47	35	173	254	796	176	4th (1)	Veres Rivne, Rodyna-Litsei, Rodyna-KOLISP
12	Iatran Berestivets	11	147	49	25	73	187	318	172	4th (5)	
13	Alina Kyiv	5	81	45	9	27	176	106	144	champions (1)	
14	Shakhtar Donetsk	4	89	43	8	38	173	137	137	4th (1)	
15	Metalist Kharkiv	6	61	42	5	14	304	70	131	champions (2)	Arsenal, Kharkiv-Kondytsioner, Kharkivianka
16	Illichivka Mariupil	9	111	39	14	58	154	275	131	3rd (2)	Azovchanka
17	Luhanochka-Spartak Luhansk	7	90	35	15	40	123	207	120	4th (2)	Luhanochka, Zorya-Spartak
18	Voskhod Stara Mayachka	4	65	36	6	23	118	106	114	3rd (3)	
19	Dnipro-1	5	85	30	11	44	135	250	101	6th (2)	Zlahoda-Dnipro-1, Zlahoda
20	EMS-Podillia Vinnytsia	7	130	26	19	85	127	370	97	9th (2)	
21	Iskra Zaporizhzhia	7	100	23	23	54	105	214	92	3rd (2)	Hrafit
22	Spartak Kyiv	3	55	26	13	16	110	52	91	runners-up (1)	Unisa Luhansk
23	Arena Kyiv	2	39	26	10	3	73	19	88	champions (1)	
24	Seasters Odesa	2	46	26	6	14	98	48	84	2nd (1)	
25	Iednist Plysky	4	62	25	5	32	102	104	80	5th (3)	
26	Stal Makiivka	4	57	22	12	23	73	61	78	3rd (1)	Stal-Nika-MMK
27	Mariupol	5	90	23	7	60	90	323	76	5th (1)	Mariupolchanka
28	Chornomorochka Odesa	8	117	17	19	81	88	357	70	4th (1)	
29	Tornado Kyiv	2	40	19	10	11	65	34	67	3rd (1)	Olimp Kyiv, Nyva Baryshivka
30	Spartak Sumy	3	41	21	4	16	65	96	67	3rd (1)	
31	Ateks Kyiv	17	224	14	23	187	145	1205	65	5th (1)	Ateks-Obolon Kyiv, Ateks-SDYuShOR-16 Kyiv
32	Polissia Zhytomyr	2	44	19	6	19	97	103	63	6th (1)	
33	Iunist Poltava	6	47	15	5	27	70	147	50	4th (1)	Kolos
34	Iuzhanka Kherson	5	51	13	4	34	85	222	43	5th (1)	
35	Borysfen Zaporizhzhia	2	40	8	14	18	28	56	38	7th (1)	
36	Krym-Iuni Simferopil	2	40	7	10	23	27	72	31	9th (2)	
37	Lada Mykolaiv	2	33	9	3	21	26	54	30	7th (1)	
38	FC Lviv	1	18	9	2	7	39	38	29	4th (1)	
39	Bukovynka Chernivtsi	1	18	5	9	4	19	15	24	5th (1)	
40	Dnipro Dnipropetrovsk	2	28	6	6	16	29	50	24	8th (1)	
41	Karpaty Lviv	2	29	7	2	20	35	106	23	6th (1)	
42	Nika Mykolaiv	1	15	7	1	7	57	35	22	7th (1)	
43	Kyivska Rus Kyiv	3	23	4	1	18	30	116	13	3rd (1)	
44	Ukrayinka Ternopil	1	14	4	0	10	13	41	12	7th (1)	
45	Sotstekh Kyiv	1	8	3	0	5	12	25	9	7th (1)	
46	Volyn Lutsk	2	12	2	3	7	16	44	9	3rd (1)	
47	Obolon Kyiv	1	18	2	3	13	11	43	9	10th (1)	
48	Lvivianka Lviv	4	23	2	2	19	22	140	8	4th (1)	
49	Krayanka Kirovohrad	2	22	2	1	19	13	116	7	6th (1)	Mriya Kirovohrad
50	TsPOR Donchanka Donetsk	1	6	1	2	3	1	19	5	6th (1)	
51	Esmira Luhansk	1	10	1	2	7	12	38	5	11th (1)	
52	Dynamo Irpin	1	3	1	0	2	3	2	3	5th (1)	
53	Oleksandriya Kyiv	1	4	1	0	3	6	18	3	8th (1)	
54	Bukovynska Nadiya	1	15	1	0	14	11	103	3	10th (1)	
55	Slaviya Kyiv	2	11	0	0	11	3	58	0	9th (2)	
56	Harmoniya Lviv	1	11	0	0	11	2	72	0	9th (1)	
57	Uzhhorod	debut									
58	DIuSSh-1 Khmelnytskyi	debut									
59	Podil Kyiv	debut									
60	SDIuShOR Iunist Chernihiv	debut									

Notes:

- Berestivets is a village of Uman Raion.
- Stara Mayachka is a village in Kherson Raion.

=== Participants with annulled record ===
Rank	Team	Seasons	P	W	D	L	GF	GA	Pts	Achievement	Other names used
1	Kolos Kherson	1	7	2	1	4	9	19	7		
2	Inhulianka Kryvyi Rih	1	9	0	1	8	3	39	1		

== All-time participants ==
The table lists the Higher League teams's place in each of the seasons. The table also tracks the Higher League teams that competed in the lower First League (<1>) when they were relegated or withdrew from the Higher League.

=== Higher League participants (1992–2012) ===
Season	1992	1993	1994	1995	1996	1997	1998	1999	2000	2001	2002	2003	2004	2005	2006	2007	2008	2009	2010	2011	2012
Teams	10	13	13	9	6	5	4	4	8	8	8	10	9	9	9	8	9	7	9	8	8
Dynamo Kyiv	1	2	4	·	·	·	·	·	·	·	·	·	·	·	·	·	·	·	·	·	·
Arena Kyiv	2	1	·	·	·	·	·	·	·	·	·	·	·	·	·	·	·	·	·	·	·
Lehenda Chernihiv	3	4	6	4	5	2	2	2	1	1	1	2	2	1	2	3	2	1	1	2	4
Olimp Kyiv / Tornado Kyiv	4	3	·	·	·	·	·	·	·	·	·	·	·	·	·	·	·	·	·	·	·
Bukovynka Chernivtsi	5	·	·	·	·	·	·	·	·	·	·	·	·	·	·	·	·	·	·	·	·
Luhanochka Luhansk/Zorya	6	5	·	·	·	·	·	·	·	4	4	5	·	·	7	5	·	·	·	·	·
Borysfen Zaporizhzhia	7	10	·	·	·	·	·	·	·	·	·	·	·	·	·	·	·	·	·	·	·
Dnipro Dnipropetrovsk	8	13	·	·	·	·	·	·	·	·	·	·	·	·	·	·	·	·	·	·	·
Krym-Iuni Simferopil	9	9	·	·	·	·	·	·	·	·	·	·	·	·	·	·	·	·	·	·	·
Chornomorochka Odesa	10	12	8	6	4	·	·	·	·	·	·	·	·	·	9	·	9	·	8	·	·
Iskra Zaporizhzhia	<1>	6	7	8	6	5	3	3	·	·	·	·	·	·	·	·	·	·	·	·	·
Donechanka Donetsk	<1>	7	1	1	1	3	1	1	2	2	3	3	4	5	4	4	5	4	4	5	3
Iunisa Luhansk	<1>	8	2	·	·	·	·	·	·	·	·	·	·	·	·	·	·	·	·	·	·
Alina Kyiv / Radosyn	<1>	11	3	2	2	1	·	·	·	·	·	·	·	·	·	·	·	·	·	·	·
Stal Makiivka	·	·	5	5	3	4	·	·	·	·	·	·	·	·	·	·	·	·	·	·	·
Lada Mykolaiv	·	<1>	9	7	·	·	·	·	·	·	·	·	·	·	·	·	·	·	·	·	·
Mriya Kirovohrad / Krayanka	<1>	<1>	10	·	·	·	·	·	6	·	·	·	·	·	·	·	·	·	·	·	·
Esmira Luhansk / Kontek	·	<1>	11	·	·	·	·	·	·	·	·	·	·	·	·	·	·	·	·	·	·
Inhulianka Kryvyi Rih	·	·	~~12~~	·	·	·	·	·	·	·	·	·	·	·	·	·	·	·	·	·	·
Iuzhanka Kherson/Kolos	<1>	<1>	~~13~~	·	·	·	·	·	·	·	·	·	·	8	5	7	7	·	9	·	·
Season	1992	1993	1994	1995	1996	1997	1998	1999	2000	2001	2002	2003	2004	2005	2006	2007	2008	2009	2010	2011	2012
Teams	10	13	13	9	6	5	4	4	8	8	8	10	9	9	9	8	9	7	9	8	8
Spartak Kyiv	·	·	·	3	·	·	·	·	·	·	·	·	·	·	·	·	·	·	·	·	·
Harmoniya Lviv	·	·	·	9	·	·	·	·	·	·	·	·	·	·	·	·	·	·	·	·	·
Lvivianka/SKIF Lviv	<1>	<1>	·	·	·	·	4	·	8	7	7	·	·	·	·	·	·	·	·	·	·
Kyivska Rus Kyiv	·	·	·	·	·	·	·	4	3	5	·	·	·	·	·	·	·	·	·	·	·
Iunist Poltava	·	·	·	·	·	·	·	·	4	6	5	6	5	9	·	·	·	·	·	·	·
Dynamo Irpin	·	·	·	·	·	·	·	·	5	·	·	·	·	·	·	·	·	·	·	·	·
Volyn Lutsk	·	·	·	·	·	·	·	·	·	3	8	·	·	·	·	·	·	·	·	·	·
Metalist/Arsenal/Kharkivianka	·	·	·	·	·	·	·	·	7	8	2	1	1	2	·	·	·	·	·	·	·
TsPOR Donechanka	·	·	·	·	·	·	·	·	·	·	6	·	·	·	·	·	·	·	·	·	·
Spartak Sumy	·	·	·	·	·	·	·	·	·	·	·	4	3	4	·	·	·	·	·	·	·
Ateks SDIuShOR-16 Kyiv	·	·	·	·	·	·	·	·	·	·	·	7	8	6	8	6	·	7	5	8	8
Oleksandriya Kyiv	·	·	·	·	·	·	·	·	·	·	·	8	·	·	·	·	·	·	·	·	·
Slaviya Kyiv	·	·	·	·	·	·	·	·	·	·	·	9	9	·	·	·	·	·	·	·	·
Naftokhimik Kalush	·	·	·	·	·	·	·	·	·	·	·	·	6	3	3	1	3	·	·	3	2
Sotstekh Kyiv	·	·	·	·	·	·	·	·	·	·	·	·	7	·	·	·	·	·	·	·	·
Rodyna Kostopil	·	·	·	·	·	·	·	·	·	·	·	·	·	7	6	8	6	5	7	4	5
Zhytlobud-1 Kharkiv	·	·	·	·	·	·	·	·	·	·	·	·	·	·	1	2	1	2	2	1	1
Illichivka Mariupil	·	·	·	·	·	·	·	·	·	·	·	10	·	·	·	·	4	3	3	7	7
Iatran Berestovets	·	·	·	·	·	·	·	·	·	·	·	·	·	·	·	·	8	6	6	6	·
Zhytlobud-2 Kharkiv	·	·	·	·	·	·	·	·	·	·	·	·	·	·	·	·	·	·	·	·	6
Season	1992	1993	1994	1995	1996	1997	1998	1999	2000	2001	2002	2003	2004	2005	2006	2007	2008	2009	2010	2011	2012
Teams	10	13	13	9	6	5	4	4	8	8	8	10	9	9	9	8	9	7	9	8	8

=== Higher League participants (2013–current) ===
Season	2013	2014	2015	2016	2017	17/18	18/19	19/20	20/21	21/22	22/23	23/24	24/25	25/26	26/27
Teams	8	8	8	7	9	10	10	10	10	11	12	12	11	10	7
Metalist 1925 Kharkiv (Zhytlobud-1)	1	1	1	2	2	1	1	2	1	2	·	4	2	1	<^>
Lehenda-ShVSM Chernihiv	2	3	2	3	3	3	·	·	·	·	·	·	·	·	·
Donechanka Donetsk	3	8	·	·	·	·	·	·	·	·	·	·	·	·	·
Naftokhimik Kalush	4	·	·	·	·	·	·	·	·	·	·	·	·	·	·
Vorskla Poltava (Zhytlobud-2)	5	2	3	1	1	2	2	1	2	1	1	1	1	3	·
Illichivka Mariupol	6	5	4	·	·	·	·	·	·	·	·	·	·	·	·
Pohoryna Kostopil (Rodyna, Veres)	7	6	5	6	8	9	8	10	<1>	<1>	8	11	<1>	<1>	check
Ateks Kyiv	8	7	8	7	9	10	<1>	<1>	<1>	11	12	<1>	<1>	<1>	<1>
Iatran Berestivets	<1>	4	6	4	4	4	7	4	·	<1>	·	·	·	·	·
Ukrayinka Ternopil	·	<1>	7	·	·	·	·	·	·	·	·	·	·	·	·
Pantery Uman	·	·	<1>	5	5	6	9	6	8	9	11	10	9	7	<^>
Dnipro-1	·	·	·	<1>	6	7	10	·	·	<1>	6	7	·	·	·
Iednist Plysky (Spartak)	<1>	<1>	<1>	<1>	7	5	5	5	·	·	·	·	·	·	·
Ladomyr Volodymyr	·	·	·	·	<1>	8	6	8	4	6	5	6	6	9	<^>
Voskhod Stara Mayachka	·	·	·	·	<1>	<1>	3	3	3	8	·	·	·	·	·
FC Lviv	·	·	·	·	·	·	4	·	·	·	·	·	·	·	·
EMS Podillia Vinnytsia	·	·	·	·	<1>	<1>	<1>	9	9	7	10	9	11	10	check
Mariupol (Mariupolchanka)	·	·	·	<1>	<1>	<1>	<1>	7	5	4	9	12	<1>	<1>	check
Karpaty Lviv	·	·	·	·	·	·	<1>	<1>	6	10	·	·	·	·	·
Nika Mykolaiv (Spartak-Orion)	·	<1>	<1>	<1>	<1>	<1>	<1>	<1>	7	<1>	·	·	·	·	·
Season	2013	2014	2015	2016	2017	17/18	18/19	19/20	20/21	21/22	22/23	23/24	24/25	25/26	26/27
Teams	8	8	8	7	9	10	10	10	10	11	12	12	11	10	7
Bukovynska Nadia	·	·	·	·	·	·	<1>	<1>	10	·	·	·	·	·	·
Kolos Kovalivka	·	·	·	·	·	·	·	<1>	<1>	5	3	2	3	4	<^>
Kryvbas Kryvyi Rih	·	·	·	·	·	·	·	·	·	3	2	3	7	8	<^>
Shakhtar Donetsk	·	·	·	·	·	·	·	·	·	<1>	4	5	5	5	<^>
Dynamo Kyiv (OKIP)	·	·	·	·	·	·	·	·	<1>	<1>	7	8	·	·	·
Seasters Odesa	·	·	·	·	·	·	·	·	·	·	·	<1>	4	2	<^>
Obolon Kyiv	·	·	·	·	·	·	·	·	·	·	·	<1>	10	·	·
Polissia Zhytomyr	·	·	·	<1>	<1>	<1>	<1>	·	·	·	·	<1>	8	6	<^>
Iunist Chernihiv	·	·	·	·	·	·	·	·	<1>	<1>	<1>	<1>	<1>	<1>	check
Uzhhorod (Mynai)	·	·	·	·	·	·	·	·	·	·	·	<1>	<1>	<1>	check
DIuSSh-1 Khmelnytskyi (Derazhnia)	·	<1>	<1>	·	·	·	·	·	·	<1>	·	<1>	<1>	<1>	check
Podil Kyiv	·	·	·	·	·	·	·	·	·	·	·	·	<1>	<1>	check
Season	2013	2014	2015	2016	2017	17/18	18/19	19/20	20/21	21/22	22/23	23/24	24/25	25/26	26/27
Teams	8	8	8	7	9	10	10	10	10	11	12	12	11	10	7

=== League participants by region ===
In bold are shown active professional clubs

Region	CoA	Nos.	Participants
Kyiv		12*	Dynamo (OKIP), Arena, Tornado (Olimp), Alina (Radosyn), Spartak (Iunisa), Kyivska Rus, Ateks, Oleksandriya, Slavia, Sotstekh, Obolon, **Podil**
Donetsk Oblast		6	Donechanka Donetsk (Tekstylnyk), Stal Makiivka, TsPOR Donechanka, Illichivka Mariupol, **Mariupol (Mariupolchanka)**, **Shakhtar Donetsk**
Dnipropetrovsk Oblast		4	Dnipro, Inhulianka Kryvyi Rih, Dnipro-1 (Zlahoda), **Kryvbas Kryvyi Rih**
Lviv Oblast		4	Harmonia Lviv, Lvivianka Lviv (SKIF), Lviv, Karpaty Lviv
Chernihiv Oblast		3	Lehenda Chernihiv, Iednist Plysky, **Iunist Chernihiv**
Luhansk Oblast		2*	Luhanochka Luhansk (Zorya), Esmira Luhansk (Kontek)
Kharkiv Oblast		2*	Arsenal Kharkiv (Metalist), **Metalist 1925 Kharkiv** (Zhytlobud-1)
Chernivtsi Oblast		2	Bukovynka Chernivtsi, Bukovynska Nadia
Zaporizhzhia Oblast		2	Borysfen Zaporizhzhia, Iskra Zaporizhzhia
Kherson Oblast		2	Iuzhanka Kherson (Kolos), Voskhod Stara Mayachka
Volyn Oblast		2	Volyn Lutsk, **Ladomyr Volodymyr**
Cherkasy Oblast		2	Iatran Berestivets, **Pantery Uman**
Poltava Oblast		2*	Iunist Poltava, Vorskla Poltava (Zhytlobud-2)
Mykolaiv Oblast		2	Lada Mykolaiv, Nika Mykolaiv (Spartak)
Kyiv Oblast		2	Dynamo Irpin, **Kolos Kovalivka** (SC Vyshneve)
Odesa Oblast		2	Chornomorochka Odesa, **Seasters Odesa**
Autonomous Republic of Crimea		1	Krym-Iuni Simferopol,
Kirovohrad Oblast		1	Mriya Kirovohrad (Krayanka),
Sumy Oblast		1	Spartak Sumy,
Ivano-Frankivsk Oblast		1	Naftokhimik Kalush,
Rivne Oblast		1	**Pohoryna Kostopil (Rodyna, Veres)**
Ternopil Oblast		1	Ukrayinka Ternopil (Ternopilchanka)
Vinnytsia Oblast		1	**EMS Podillia Vinnytsia**
Zhytomyr Oblast		1	**Polissia Zhytomyr**
Khmelnytskyi Oblast		1	**DIuSSh-1 Khmelnytskyi**
Zakarpattia Oblast		1	**Uzhhorod**
