= WFC Naftokhimik Kalush =

Naftokhimik Kalush
- Full name: Women's Football Club Naftokhimik Kalush
- Founded: 2004
- Dissolved: 2009
- Ground: Khimik Stadium, Kalush, Ukraine
- Chairman: (Ukraine) Serhiy Chmykhalov
- Manager: (Ukraine) Petro Lesiv
- League: Ukrainian Women's League
- 2008: 3rd
Home colours	Away colours

Naftokhimik Kalush (Ukrainian: "Нафтохімік" Калуш) was a Ukrainian professional women's football club from Kalush, Ukraine. They played in dark blue shirts and dark blue shorts at home and when they are away they play in white shirts and white shorts.

== History ==
It was founded in April 2004 as a women's team of FC Spartak Ivano-Frankivsk, while competing out of Kalush. Spartak has already merged its operations with the local FC Kalush which became its farm club. In 2006 Spartak Ivano-Frankivsk lost its sponsors (Russian Lukoil) and stopped supporting its women team. The team went through reorganization and reestablished as an independent football club Naftokhimik Kalush.

In the 2007 season they have won their first Championship. In the 2008-09 they played in the UEFA Women's Cup. In beginning 2009 the club suffered financial difficulties, went into bankruptcy and folded.

In 2011 it reappeared in the Ukrainian League.

The 2007 Naftokhimik championship squad:

- Goalkeepers: Kateryna Samson, Yuliya Drachuk, Olha Kharkava.
- Defenders: Tetyana Ryzhova, Nataliya Lishchyna, Oksana Nefyodova, Khrystyna Pasichnyk, Tetyana Apollonina.
- Midfielders: Yanina Opayits, Kateryna Bochenko, (Moldova) Kristina Dolgovich, Yuliya Hnydyuk, Olha Maslyanko, Kateryna Kirina, (Belarus) Tatsiana Shramok.
- Forwards: (Belarus) Aksana Znaydzyonava, Khrystyna Botyuk (captain), (Belarus) Liliya Kisyelyevich, (Bulgaria) Elisaveta Todorova, (Bulgaria) Radoslava Slavcheva.
- Head coach: Ihor Yurchenko. Coaches: Petro Melnyk, Petro Lesiv, and Kyrylo Sushko.

== Honours ==
- Top Division
  - Winners (1): 2007

== European History ==
Season	Competition	Stage	Result	Opponent
2008–09	UEFA Women's Cup	Group Stage	2-1	(Estonia) FC Levadia Tallinn
			1-0	(Greece) P.A.O.K. F.C.
			1-0	(Poland) KŚ AZS Wrocław
		Group Stage	1-5	(Germany) FCR 2001 Duisburg
			1-5	(Denmark) Brøndby IF
			1-4	(Spain) Levante UD
