= WFC Illichivka Mariupol =

- Full name: Illichivka Mariupol
- Founded: 2005
- Dissolved: 2015
- Ground: Mariupol
- League: Ukrainian Women's League

WFC Illichivka Mariupol was a Ukrainian women's football club from Mariupol.

== History ==
Illichivka was established at the end of 2005 and was a second Mariupol team. Previously in 2003 in the Ukrainian Women's League competed Azovchanka Mariupol which lost all its four games. Azovchanka is an older team that takes its roots from the Soviet competitions where it participated at the Soviet third tier in 1991.

Illichivka entered the Ukrainian Women's League in 2008. As its male colleague team FC Illichivets Mariupol, it also represented the Mariupol Metallurgical Complex of Vladimir Lenin (Illich Steel and Iron Works, MMK). The female team was sponsored by the industrial complex security service. In 2005–2007 Illichivka competed in unofficial competitions.

The new Mariupol team was more successful than its predecessor placing third during its first three seasons, but at the end of 2010 season it faced some financial hardship and further participation in competitions was under question. The club was banned out of the Ukrainian Women's League after the 2015 season due to financial manipulations and later was reorganized again as a city team "Mariupolchanka".
