= WFC Tornado Kyiv =

- Full name: Tornado Kyiv
- Founded: 1988
- Dissolved: 1993
- Ground: Kyiv
- League: Ukrainian Women's League

WFC Tornado Kyiv was a Soviet and Ukrainian women's football club from Kyiv. The club was dissolved in 1993.

== History ==
Founded in 1988 as Nyva Baryshivka, the team competed in several Soviet competitions, including the Soviet Top League in 1990 and 1991. The club won the league in 1990 by defeating Tekstilschik Ramenskoye of Russia in the final. The following season, the club relocated across Kyiv Oblast to Kyiv, but only managed to place 8th in its group (out of two).

Following the dissolution of the Soviet Union, the club entered Ukrainian competitions in 1992, in which it placed fourth. In 1993, WFC Tornado placed 3rd in the Ukrainian championship.

== Titles ==
- Soviet League
  - Winners (1): 1990
- Ukrainian League
  - Third (1): 1993
- Ukrainian Cup
  - Winners (1): 1992
  - Runners-up (1): 1993
