= WFC Alina Kyiv =

- Full name: Alina Kyiv
- Founded: 1990
- Dissolved: 1997
- Ground: Kyiv
- League: Ukrainian Women's League

WFC Alina Kyiv was a Soviet and Ukrainian women's football club from Kyiv.

== History ==
Founded in 1990 as Radosin Kyiv, it entered the Soviet competitions in 1990 in the Second League for the next two seasons.

Following dissolution of the Soviet Union, in 1992 the club entered Ukrainian competitions plying in the First League. The club was promoted to the Top League due to expansion and liquidation of the First League. Radosin Kyiv became Alina Kyiv, which entered Top League.

In 1997 the club became a national champion and was dissolved.

== Titles ==
- Ukrainian League
  - Winners (1): 1997
  - Runners-up (1): 1995
- Ukrainian Cup
  - Winners (1): 1995, 1997
  - Runners-up (1): 1994, 1996
