= WFC Arsenal Kharkiv =

Arsenal Kharkiv
- Full name: Arsenal Kharkiv
- Founded: 2000
- Dissolved: 2006
- Ground: Kharkiv
- Chairman: Vitaliy Danilov
- League: Ukrainian Women's League

Arsenal Kharkiv was a Ukrainian women's football team of FC Kharkiv and before FC Metalist Kharkiv.

== History ==
The club has been the first women football team out of Kharkiv in Ukrainian competitions since dissolution of the Soviet Union. The club was admitted to the Ukrainian Women's League in 2000 as Kharkivianka Kharkiv.

For the first couple of seasons the club was placing at bottom of tournament table. In 2002 the club placed second after Lehenda Chernihiv. It also lost final of the national cup to Lehenda same season. Next season now as Kharkiv-Kondytsioner, the club won the championship placing ahead of Lehenda and also defeated Lehenda in final game of the national cup.

In 2004 the club as a female squad became part of FC Metalist Kharkiv and was renamed as Metalist Kharkiv. As a year ago it also won championship finishing ahead of Lehenda and defeated it in final game of the national cup. At the end of 2004 a vice-president of Metalist Vitaliy Danilov, after a conflict, he left Metalist for Arsenal and based on its first squad formed a new club FC Kharkiv, while its female squad kept Arsenal Kharkiv brand. The regular FC Arsenal Kharkiv restarted from the Second League. After that season, the female squad was dissolved.

In 2006 former players of Arsenal joined a new club that was formed WFC Zhytlobud-1 Kharkiv.

== European History ==
Season	Competition	Stage	Result	Opponent
2004–05	UEFA Women's Cup	Group Stage	2-1	(Faroe Islands) KÍ Klaksvík
			8-1	(Wales) Cardiff City L.F.C.
			0-2	(Poland) KŚ AZS Wrocław
2005–06	UEFA Women's Cup	Group Stage	20-0	(Cyprus) AEK Kokkinochorion
			8-1	(Israel) Maccabi Holon F.C.
			0-5	(Poland) KŚ AZS Wrocław
