= WFC Arena Kyiv =

- Full name: Arena Kyiv
- Founded: 1988
- Dissolved: 1993
- Ground: Kyiv
- League: Ukrainian Women's League
- 1993: champion, withdrew

WFC Arena Kyiv was a Soviet and Ukrainian women's football club from Kyiv. The club was liquidated in 1993 after winning the league's championship.

== History ==
Founded in 1988 and competed in several Soviet competitions including the Soviet Top League in 1990 and 1991. The club placed only sixth in its group and managed to beat the Russian Prometei Leningrad for the 11th place play-off. Next season the club managed to win its group and qualify for the championship play-offs, but in semifinals it lost first to Tekstilschik Ramenskoye and another loss for the 3rd place to SKIF Malakhovka.

Following dissolution of the Soviet Union, in 1992 the club entered Ukrainian competitions representing smaller town of Fastiv near Kyiv. In 1993, WFC Arena led by Serhiy Kachkarov won the Ukrainian championship surpassing the former champion Dynamo Kyiv by 4 tournament points.

The 1993 Ukrainian national champions became A.Zubak, A.Korniyenko, L.Pavlenko, M.Aliyeva, L.Protsenko, I.Titova, L.Kovalevska, O.Hidinach, M.Borchuk, N.Ryabichenko, O.Rezvin, L.Pokotylo, H.Prykhodko, O.Andrushchenko, T.Husakova, O.Romanova. The head coach was Serhiy Kachkarov, assisting – V.Izhko.

== Titles ==
- Ukrainian League
  - Winners (1): 1993
  - Runners-up (1): 1992
- Ukrainian Cup
  - Winners (1): 1992
  - Runners-up (1): 1993
