= FC Dynamo Kyiv (women) =

Dynamo Kyiv
- Full name: Women Football Club Dynamo Kyiv
- Founded: 1989
- Dissolved: 2024
- Ground: Dynamo Stadium, Kyiv
- Capacity: 16,873
- League: Ukrainian Women's League
- 2023–2024: 8th

FC Dynamo Kyiv women team was a Soviet and Ukrainian women's football team of FC Dynamo Kyiv. The team was liquidated in 1994 after Dynamo Kyiv was acquired by Hryhoriy Surkis. But again renewed in 2021 and entered to the Ukrainian Women's League to play in the First League.

== History during 1989–1994 ==
Founded in 1989 as part of Dynamo Kyiv, it entered the Soviet Top League in 1990. The club placed second in its group and yielded the third place play-off to Tekstilschik Ramenskoye. Next season the club only placed 9th in its group.

Following dissolution of the Soviet Union, in 1992 the club entered Ukrainian competitions. In 1992, WFC Dynamo won the first Ukrainian championship. Next season Dynamo yielded the first place. In 1993 the club placed only fourth.

== Reestablishment in 2021 ==
In 2021 FC Dynamo Kyiv women team was revived based on a female team of the Piddubny Olympic College (RVUFK) and entered to the Ukrainian Women's League to play in the First League, the second tier of the Ukrainian women association football pyramid. As the manager was appointed Volodymyr Pyatenko.

== Titles ==
- Ukrainian League
  - Winners (1): 1992
  - Runners-up (1): 1993
- Ukrainian Cup
  - Winners (1): 1992
  - Runners-up (1): 1993

== Managers ==
- 1991–1993 Oleksandr Chubarov
- 2020–2021 Tetyana Verezubova
- 2021 Viktoriya Dudka
- 2021–2023 Volodymyr Pyatenko
- 2023–2024 Volodymyr Yefimako
