= WFC Donchanka =

Ukrainian football club

- Full name: WFC Donchanka
- Founded: 1992
- Ground: TsPOR Donchanka Stadium, Donetsk
- Capacity: 1,000
- Manager: Tatiana Gromovska
- League: Ukrainian Women's League
- 2012: 3rd
- Website: http://www.donchanka.com/
Home colours	Away colours

WFC Donchanka (Russian: Дончанка), also known as Donchanka TsPOR and Donechanka (Ukrainian: Донеччанка), was a Ukrainian women's football club from Donetsk. Donchanka was the leading Ukrainian club, holding the record for the most titles (up to 5) from 1995 to 2009.

The name of Donechanka was used in Ukrainian media and in official reports; at the same time, the name of Donchanka was used in the Russian media and on the club's shield. TsPOR is an acronym for the Training Center of the Olympic Reserve.

Founded in 1992 as Tekstilshchik Donetsk, it was renamed as Donetsk-Ros in 1994 before taking its current name in 1997. The women's team was created as part of FC Tekstilschik Donetsk, which existed at the Donetsk Cotton Factory and had other teams, including a men's team. The women's team became the most successful in the club. Donchanka was the leading Ukrainian team for much of the 1990s, winning five championships and four national cups between 1994 and 1999. In 1999, the club lost its sponsors and leading players, and it shifted to young, talented players. It was third in the 2012 championship, its best result since 2003.

== Titles ==
- Ukrainian League
  - Winners (5): 1994, 1995, 1996, 1998, 1999
  - Runners-up (2): 2000, 2001
  - Third place (5):, 1997, 2002, 2003, 2012, 2013
- Ukrainian Cup (4)
  - Winners (4): 1994, 1996, 1998, 1999
  - Runners-up (4): 1995, 1997, 1999, 2012

== 2012 squad ==
As of 20 December 2012, according to the club's website Note: Flags indicate national team as defined under FIFA eligibility rules; some limited exceptions apply. Players may hold more than one non-FIFA nationality.

No.	Pos.	Nation	Player
2	DF	UKR	Maria Pryyma
3	DF	UKR	Ekaterina Papaylo
4	DF	UKR	Alina Klavdyenko
5	MF	UKR	Olga Avdeyeva
6	MF	UKR	Anastasia Voronin
7	DF	UKR	Ekaterina Ishutina
8	DF	UKR	Alyona Telnaya
9	FW	UKR	Anna Voronin
10	DF	UKR	Tatiana Gromovska
11	MF	UKR	Inna Zagumennaya
14	FW	UKR	Darya Penzeva

No.	Pos.	Nation	Player
15	MF	UKR	Alena Kovtun
16	FW	UKR	Vitalina Mazurova
17	MF	UKR	Irina Mayborodina
18	MF	UKR	Natalia Staso
19	FW	UKR	Lydia Lashko
20	MF	UKR	Oksana Chernaya
21	DF	UKR	Yulia Staloverova
22	DF	UKR	Violetta Karnafel
23	GK	UKR	Yulia Poznogireva
28	GK	UKR	Karina Govorunova
