= Spartak ShVSM Chernihiv =

- Full name: Spartak ShVSM Chernihiv
- Founded: 2000
- Dissolved: 2021
- Ground: Chernihiv Arena; Yunist Stadium; Lokomotiv Stadium; Tekstylschyk Stadium
- Capacity: 2000
- League: First League Top

Spartak ShVSM Chernihiv (Ukrainian: Спартак Чернігів) was a Ukrainian women's football team in Chernihiv, Ukraine. Established in early 2000 as a department of the local Spartak sports society, the team played from 2013 to 2016 at the amateur level (First League) and was absorbed by the neighbouring FC Yednist Plysky in 2017.

== History ==
=== Origin ===
After being established in 2000 the Spartak Chernihiv team entered the revived First League competition in 2013. After a pause in 2014 the team returned for the 2015 First League competition, becoming the competition champion in 2016 and being promoted to the Ukrainian Women's League for the 2017 season.

=== Mergers ===
The Yednist Plysky women's team was established in 2017, modelled on Spartak Chernihiv. The latter's 2016 success prompted the president of Yednist Plysky, Mykhailo Holytsia, to offer Spartak financial assistance, resulting in the Yednist Plysky women's team becoming the de facto Spartak Chernihiv team renamed.

In 2018 Yednist Plysky merged with Lehenda-ShVSM Chernihiv to become Yednist-ShVSM Plysky. The ShVSM (School of the Higher Sports Mastery) chairman Volodymyr Maherramov was also Lehenda's chairman, and became a chairman of the merged team as well. Many players who played for Lehenda moved to the new Yednist-ShVSM Plysky team because it was more financially stable.

In June 2020 Yednist-ShVSM Plysky informed the Ukrainian Association of Football that it was ending its participation in competitions.

== Stadium and facilities ==
The team had first been based at the sports complex located on Vulytsia Museina, 4, in Chernihiv. However, in 2016 the Physical Culture and Sports Association of Ukraine claimed that the building belonged to them. Subsequently the team played in Tekstylschyk stadium, in Lokomotiv stadium, and also in the new and modern Chernihiv Arena in Chernihiv, which belongs to FC Chernihiv.

== Notable players ==
- Tamila Khimich
- Liudmyla Shmatko

== League and cup history ==
Season	Div.	Pos.	Pl.	W	D	L	GS	GA	P	Domestic Cup	Europe	Notes
Spartak Chernihiv
2013	Ukrainian Women's First League											
paused participation in 2014
2015	Ukrainian Women's First League											
2016	Ukrainian Women's First League	1										Promoted
Yednist Plysky
2017	Ukrainian Women's League											

== Honours ==
- Ukrainian Women's First League: Winners 2016

== See also ==
- FC Desna Chernihiv
- FC Desna-2 Chernihiv
- FC Desna-3 Chernihiv
- SDYuShOR Desna
- Yunist Chernihiv
- Lehenda Chernihiv
