= Viktor Lazarenko =

Soviet footballer and Ukrainian coach

Viktor Mikhailovich Lazarenko
Personal information
- Full name: Лазаренко Виктор Михайлович
- Date of birth: 1 January 1957 (age 69)
- Place of birth: Chernihiv Ukrainian SSR, USSR
- Position: Defender

Senior career*
Years	Team	Apps	(Gls)
1979–1984	Dynamo Kyiv	0	(0)
1977–1980	Desna Chernihiv	169	(3)
1981–1983	Zirka Kropyvnytskyi	41	(0)
1984	Tekstylnyk Chernihiv	0	(0)
1985	Khimik Chernihiv	1	(0)
1986–1987	Desna Chernihiv	68	(0)

Managerial career
- 2013: Yunist Chernihiv
- * Club domestic league appearances and goals

Victor Lazarenko (Russian: Лазаренко Виктор Михайлович) (born in Juauary 1, 1957) is a retired Soviet football player and Ukrainian coach. He spend most of his career to Desna Chernihiv the main club in Chernihiv.

== Career ==
Victor Lazarenko, started his career in the reserve squad of Dynamo Kyiv. In 1977 he moved to Desna Chernihiv, where on his first season (1977) got 14th in the Soviet Second League Zone 2.

In 1981, he moved to Zirka Kropyvnytskyi, where he stayed for two seasons.

In 1984, he moved to Tekstylnyk Chernihiv, where he won the Chernihiv Oblast Football Cup. In 1985, he moved to Khimik Chernihiv, where he won the Chernihiv Oblast Football Championship.

In 1986, he returned to Desna Chernihiv, where he stayed for two season. In 2013 he was appointed as coach of Yunist Chernihiv.

In 2015, he played with Andriy Yarmolenko and Berezenko for the Chernihiv team in honor of the opening of a new football field the Stadium Yunist. In a recently interview he spoke about his experience to play with a start like Andriy Yarmolenko.

== Honours ==
Tekstylnyk Chernihiv

- Chernihiv Oblast Football Cup: 1984

Khimik Chernihiv

- Chernihiv Oblast Football Championship: 1985
