= 2016 Ukrainian Women's Cup =

Tournament details
- Country: Ukraine
- Dates: 30 June – 8 October 2016
- Teams: 8

Final positions
- Champions: Zhytlobud-1 Kharkiv
- Runners-up: Lehenda Chernihiv

The 2016 Ukrainian Women's Cup was the 24th season of Ukrainian knockout competitions among women teams.

== Competition schedule ==
=== Quarterfinals ===
30 June 2016	Prykarpattia-DYuSSh3 Ivano-Frankivsk (I)	0–2	(I) Pantery Uman	Ivano-Frankivsk
15:00	? 68' (o.g.)	Report	? 45+1'	Stadium: Hirka; Attendance: 50; Referee: Inna Vakulko (Rivne Oblast)

30 June 2016	Chornomorochka (I)	0–19	(I) Zhytlobud-1 Kharkiv	Odesa
13:00		Report	Kovtun 7', 34', 36', 37'; Nesterenko 8'; Petryk 12', 41', 73'; ? 26' (pen.); Nadyezhdina 53' (pen.), 57'; Mozolska 55', 63', 70' (pen.), 82', 90'; Tykhonova 62', 83'; Mazurova 90+3' (pen.)	Stadium: SKA; Attendance: 100

30 June 2016	Lehenda Chernihiv (I)	7–0	(I) Ateks Kyiv	Chernihiv
16:00	Vintonyak 26', 58', 60'; Salai 28'; Khimich 29', 65'; Shmatko 33'	Report		Stadium: Tekstylnyk stadium Attendance: 200; Referee: Nataliya Mamchur (Rivne)

30 June 2016	Luhanochka Luhansk (II)	+/- (TR)	(I) Zhytlobud-2 Kharkiv	Komsomolske, Zmiiv Raion
17:00		Report		Stadium: Enerhetyk; Attendance: 200; Referee: Kateryna Usova (Kyiv Oblast)

=== Semifinals ===
23 September 2016	Pantery Uman (I)	0–4	(I) Zhytlobud-1 Kharkiv	Uman
15:00	Bilokur 52' (o.g.)	Report	Voronina 9'; Mozolska 14'; Yeryomenko 55'	Stadium: Tsentralnyi Stadion; Attendance: 200; Referee: Kristina Kozoroh (Kyiv Oblast)

23 September 2016	Luhanochka Luhansk (II)	1–4 (a.e.t.)	(I) Lehenda Chernihiv	Kharkiv
15:00	Rapa 103'	Report	Shmatko 100', 114'; Vintonyak 111', 115'	Stadium: Zirka; Attendance: 300; Referee: Nataliya Mamchur (Rivne)

=== Final ===
8 October 2016	Lehenda Chernihiv (I)	1–4	(I) Zhytlobud-1 Kharkiv	Ternopil
18:00	Shmatko 52'	Report	Nesterenko 14', 65'; Melkonyants 69'; Shevchuk 75'	Stadium: Miskyi; Attendance: 860; Referee: Kateryna Usova (Kyiv Oblast)

== See also ==
- 2016 Ukrainian Women's League
- 2016–17 Ukrainian Cup
- 2015–16 Ukrainian Cup
