= 2015 Ukrainian Women's League =

Ukrainian Football Championship
- Season: 2015
- Champions: Zhytlobud-1 Kharkiv
- UEFA Women's Champions League: Zhytlobud-1 Kharkiv

The 2015 season of the Ukrainian Football Championship was the 24th season of Ukraine's women's football league. It ran from 24 April 2015 to 3 October 2015.

== Teams ==
Locations of teams in the 2015 Higher League

=== Team changes ===
Promoted from Persha Liha	Withdrawn
Ternopolianka Ternopil	TsPOR-Donchanka Donetsk

== Vyshcha Liha table ==
Pos	Team	Pld	W	D	L	GF	GA	GD	Pts	Qualification or relegation
1	Zhytlobud-1 Kharkiv (Note: Participant of the 2015 Ukrainian Women's Cup final.)	14	12	1	1	69	7	+62	37	Qualification to Champions League
2	Lehenda-ShVSM Chernihiv	14	12	0	2	52	6	+46	36	
3	Zhytlobud-2 Kharkiv	14	11	1	2	64	9	+55	34	
4	Illichivka Mariupol	14	6	0	8	17	30	−13	18	Expelled
5	Rodyna Kostopil	14	5	1	8	18	48	−30	16	
6	Iatran Berestivets	14	4	1	9	21	41	−20	13	
7	Ternopolianka Ternopil	14	4	0	10	13	41	−28	12	Withdrew
8	Ateks SDIuShOR-16 Kyiv	14	0	0	14	3	75	−72	0	

Source: [ ]
Rules for classification: 1) Points; 2) Head-to-head points; 3) Head-to-head goal difference; 4) Head-to-head goals scored; 5) Goal difference; 6) Goals scored.

=== Vyshcha Liha Results ===
Home \ Away	ATK	IAT	ILL	LCH	ROD	TER	ZH1	ZH2
Ateks SDIuShOR-16 Kyiv		1–2	0–2	0–5	0–3	1–2	1–10	0–13
Iatran Berestivets	8–0		1–2	0–7	4–2	0–1	1–5	1–5
Illichivka Mariupol	4–0	2–1		-:+	4–2	2–1	0–2	1–8
Lehenda-ShVSM Chernihiv	10–0	3–0	+:-		9–0	4–0	2–0	1–0
Rodyna Kostopil	1–0	2–2	2–0	0–5		2–0	1–8	0–4
Ternopolianka Ternopil	5–0	0–1	3–0	1–5	0–2		0–3	0–3
Zhytlobud-1 Kharkiv	3–0	7–0	4–0	3–0	8–0	12–0		3–1
Zhytlobud-2 Kharkiv	7–0	4–0	6–0	2–1	4–1	6–0	1–1	

Source: WFPL.UA
Legend: Blue = home team win; Yellow = draw; Red = away team win.

=== Top scorers ===
Rank	Player	Club	Goals
1	(Ukraine) Veronika Andrukhiv	Zhytlobud-2 Kharkiv	21 (3)
2	(Ukraine) Yana Kalinina	Zhytlobud-2 Kharkiv	15 (1)
3	(Ukraine) Anna Mozolska	Zhytlobud-1 Kharkiv	14 (0)
4	(Ukraine) Mariya Vintonyak	Lehenda-ShVSM Chernihiv	12 (0)
5	(Ukraine) Olha Ovdiychuk	Zhytlobud-1 Kharkiv	11 (0)
6	(Ukraine) Anna Voronina	Zhytlobud-1 Kharkiv	10 (0)
7	(Ukraine) Tamila Khimich	Lehenda-ShVSM Chernihiv	9 (2)

== Persha Liha ==
=== Group stage ===
==== Group 1 ====
Pos	Team	Pld	W	D	L	GF	GA	GD	Pts	
1	DIuSSh-3 Ivano-Frankivsk (Note: DIuSSh-3 Ivano-Frankivsk had 3 points deducted for failing to appear at the match against DIuSSh-1 Khmelnytskyi.)	8	6	1	1	27	7	+20	16	Qualified to Persha Liha final stage
2	Spartak Chernihiv	8	5	0	3	17	18	−1	15	Qualified to Persha Liha final stage
3	Iantarochka Novoyavorivsk	8	4	1	3	24	18	+6	13	
4	Kolos-Mriya Makhnivka	8	2	0	6	14	24	−10	6	
5	DIuSSh-1 Khmelnytskyi (Note: DIuSSh-1 Khmelnytskyi had 3 points deducted for failing to appear at the match against Spartak Chernihiv.)	8	2	0	6	11	26	−15	3	

Source: wfpl.com.ua
Rules for classification: 1) Points; 2) Head-to-head points; 3) Head-to-head goal difference; 4) Head-to-head goals scored; 5) Goal difference; 6) Goals scored.

==== Group 2 ====
Pos	Team	Pld	W	D	L	GF	GA	GD	Pts	
1	Pantery Uman	4	3	1	0	19	8	+11	10	Qualified to Persha Liha play-offs
2	Orion-Avto Mykolaiv	4	2	1	1	19	11	+8	7	Qualified to Persha Liha play-offs
3	Chornomorochka Odesa	4	0	0	4	2	21	−19	0	
4	Zhytlobud-2-KhDPU Kharkiv (Note: Zhytlobud-2-KhDPU Kharkiv played only 2 games and won both. After that, the team failed to appear in subsequent matches and, at first, had 3 points deducted, but was later expelled completely. All their results were purged.)	0	0	0	0	0	0	0	0	Expelled

Source: wfpl.com.ua
Rules for classification: 1) Points; 2) Head-to-head points; 3) Head-to-head goal difference; 4) Head-to-head goals scored; 5) Goal difference; 6) Goals scored.

=== Play-offs ===
All matches were played in Uman at Stadion Umanfermmash.

==== Semifinals ====
Team 1	Score	Team 2
DIuSSh-3 Ivano-Frankivsk	3 – 2	Orion-Avto Mykolaiv
Pantery Uman	3 – 2 (a.e.t.)	Spartak Chernihiv

==== Finals ====
Third place

Team 1	Score	Team 2
Orion-Avto Mykolaiv	6 – 4	Spartak Chernihiv

Final

Team 1	Score	Team 2
DIuSSh-3 Ivano-Frankivsk	1 – 1 (2–3 p)	Pantery Uman

Pantery Uman were crowned as the champions of the 2015 Persha Liha. They gained promotion to the Vyshcha Liha.
