= Yunist Stadium =

Yunist Stadium may refer to any of several stadiums in Ukraine:

- Yunist Stadium (Chernihiv), home of the FC Yunist Chernihiv in Chernihiv, Chernihiv Oblast
- Yunist Stadium (Horishni Plavni), home of the FC Hirnyk-Sport Horishni Plavni in Horishni Plavni (formerly named Komsomolsk), Poltava Oblast
- Yunist Stadium (Ivano-Frankivsk), in Ivano-Frankivsk, Ivano-Frankivsk Oblast
- Yunist Stadium (Kalinine), home of FC Feniks-Illichovets Kalinine in Kalinine, Krasnohvardiiske Raion, Crimea
- Yunist Stadium (Kolomyia), home of FC Karpaty Kolomyia in Kolomyia, Ivano-Frankivsk Oblast
- Yunist Stadium (Lviv), home of the RC Batyari in Lviv, Lviv Oblast
- Yunist Stadium (Varva), home of the FC Fakel Varva in Varva, Chernihiv Oblast
- Yunist Stadium (Yaremche), hosted the 2012 Amateur League championship match in Yaremche, Ivano-Frankivsk Oblast
