= 2015 Ukrainian Women's Cup =

Tournament details
- Country: Ukraine
- Dates: 4 July – 20 August 2015
- Teams: 7

Final positions
- Champions: Zhytlobud-1 Kharkiv
- Runners-up: Lehenda Chernihiv

The 2015 Ukrainian Women's Cup was the 23rd season of Ukrainian knockout competitions among women's teams.

== Competition schedule ==
=== Quarterfinals ===
4 July 2015	Yantarochka Novoyavorivsk (II)	+/- (TR)	(I) Yatran Berestivets
		Report

4 July 2015	Chornomorochka Odesa (II)	+/- (TR)	(I) Zhytlobud-2 Kharkiv
		Report

5 July 2015	Pantery Uman (II)	0–4	(I) Lehenda Chernihiv	Uman, Cherkasy Oblast
17:00		Report	Skydan 53'; Vintonyak 61'; Onopko 66'; Solomakha 85'	Stadium: Umanfermmash (artificial); Attendance: 0

=== Semifinals ===
11 July 2015	Lehenda Chernihiv (I)	13–0	(II) Yantarochka Novoyavorivsk	Chernihiv
17:00	Kozyrenko 5', 37', 66'; Vintonyak 23', 28', 44'; Khimych 32', 41', 73', 90'; Ryzhova 42' (pen.); Onopko 55'; Pereviznyk 63'	Report		Stadium: imeni Haharyna; Attendance: 200

15 July 2015	Yantarochka Novoyavorivsk (II)	0–9	(I) Lehenda Chernihiv	Novoyavorivsk, Lviv Oblast
15:00		Report	Pereviznyk 2'; Shmatko 4', 5', 65'; Kozyrenko 13'; Korsun 31'; Ryzhova 84'; Skydan 90'	Stadium: Tsentralnyi; Attendance: 0 Referee: Nataliya Mamchur (Rivne)

16 July 2015	Zhytlobud-1 Kharkiv (I)	18–0	(II) Chornomorochka Odesa	Lyubotyn, Kharkiv Oblast
12:30	Mayborodina 3'; Nesterenko 9'; Mozolska 13'; Ovdiychuk 16', 21', 34'; Voronina 38', 70', 79'; Yeryomenko 57', 65'; Tykhonova 71', 72', 83'; Kostyuchenko 78'	Report		Stadium: Olimpiyets; Attendance: 80; Referee: Alyona Kvasha (Kyiv Oblast)

23 July 2015	Chornomorochka Odesa (II)	0–10	(I) Zhytlobud-1 Kharkiv	Odesa
13:00		Report	Ovdiychuk 4', 19', 60'; Nesterenko 14'; Mayborodina 21'; Voronina 38', 75'; Herasymchuk 43' (pen.); Tykhonova 57'	Stadium: SKA; Attendance: 100

=== Final ===
20 August 2015	Lehenda Chernihiv (I)	0–4	(I) Zhytlobud-1 Kharkiv	Kyiv
18:00		Report	Mozolska 60'; Znaydenova 70'; Nesterenko 74'; Ovdiychuk 76'; Kostyuchenko (yellow card) 72' (yellow-red card) 90'	Stadium: imeni Bannikova; Attendance: 0

== See also ==
- 2015 Ukrainian Women's League
- 2014–15 Ukrainian Cup
- 2015–16 Ukrainian Cup
