= 2016 Ukrainian Women's League =

Ukrainian Women's League
- Season: 2016
- Champions: Zhytlobud-2 Kharkiv
- UEFA Women's Champions League: Zhytlobud-2 Kharkiv

The 2016 season of the Ukrainian Championship Higher League was the 25th season of Ukraine's women's football league. It ran from 22 April 2016 to 13 November 2016.

== Teams ==
Locations of teams in the 2016 Higher League

=== Team changes ===
Promoted from Persha Liha	Withdrawn
Pantery Uman	Illichivka Mariupol Ternopolianka Ternopil

== Vyshcha Liha table ==
Pos	Team	Pld	W	D	L	GF	GA	GD	Pts	Qualification or relegation
1	Zhytlobud-2 Kharkiv	12	10	2	0	61	5	+56	32	Qualification to Champions League
2	Zhytlobud-1 Kharkiv (Note: Participant of the 2016 Ukrainian Women's Cup final.)	12	9	3	0	60	5	+55	30	
3	Lehenda-ShVSM Chernihiv	12	8	1	3	45	15	+30	25	
4	Iatran Berestivets	12	5	1	6	23	22	+1	16	
5	Pantery Uman	12	2	2	8	12	43	−31	8 (Note: Head-to-head points: Pantery 4, Rodyna 1)	
6	Rodyna Kostopil	12	2	2	8	11	43	−32	8	
7	Ateks SDIuShOR-16 Kyiv	12	0	1	11	3	82	−79	1	

Source: [ ]
Rules for classification: 1) Points; 2) Head-to-head points; 3) Head-to-head goal difference; 4) Head-to-head goals scored; 5) Goal difference; 6) Goals scored.

=== Vyshcha Liha Results ===
Home \ Away	ATK	IAT	LCH	PAN	ROD	ZH1	ZH2
Ateks SDIuShOR-16 Kyiv		0–3	0–11	1–5	-:+	0–11	0–8
Iatran Berestivets	6–0		0–2	4–1	2–2	0–4	0–3
Lehenda-ShVSM Chernihiv	10–0	2–1		5–0	4–1	0–2	1–3
Pantery Uman	0–0	2–4	1–4		1–0	0–6	0–7
Rodyna Kostopil	3–2	2–3	2–4	1–1		0–6	0–4
Zhytlobud-1 Kharkiv	13–0	3–0	1–1	7–1	4–0		1–1
Zhytlobud-2 Kharkiv	12–0	1–0	4–1	4–0	12–0	2–2	

Source: WFPL.UA
Legend: Blue = home team win; Yellow = draw; Red = away team win.

=== Top scorers ===
Rank	Player	Club	Goals
1	(Ukraine) Tamila Khimich	Lehenda-ShVSM Chernihiv	16 (1)
2	(Ukraine) Olha Ovdiychuk	Zhytlobud-1 Kharkiv	14 (0)
3	(Ukraine) Yana Kalinina	Zhytlobud-2 Kharkiv	12 (0)
4	(Ukraine) Veronika Andrukhiv	Zhytlobud-2 Kharkiv	10 (0)
4	(Ukraine) Lyudmila Shmatko	Lehenda-ShVSM Chernihiv	10 (0)
6	(Ukraine) Anastasiya Skorynina	Zhytlobud-2 Kharkiv	9 (0)
7	(Ukraine) Yelyzaveta Kostyuchenko	Zhytlobud-1 Kharkiv	7 (2)
7	(Ukraine) Mariya Tykhonova	Zhytlobud-1 Kharkiv	7 (3)

== Persha Liha ==
=== Qualifying Group stage ===
==== Group 1 ====
Pos	Team	Pld	W	D	L	GF	GA	GD	Pts	
1	Lvivianka Lviv	8	8	0	0	30	2	+28	24	Qualified to Persha Liha final stage
2	DIuSSh-3 Ivano-Frankivsk	8	3	2	3	13	9	+4	11 (Note: Head-to-head points: DIuSSh-3 4, Kolos-Mriya 1)	Qualified to Persha Liha final stage
3	Kolos-Mriya Makhnivka	8	3	2	3	19	19	0	11	
4	Iantarochka Novoyavorivsk	8	3	1	4	16	20	−4	10	
5	MFC Zhytomyr	8	0	1	7	3	31	−28	1	

Source: wfpl.com.ua
Rules for classification: 1) Points; 2) Head-to-head points; 3) Head-to-head goal difference; 4) Head-to-head goals scored; 5) Goal difference; 6) Goals scored.

==== Group 2 ====
Pos	Team	Pld	W	D	L	GF	GA	GD	Pts	
1	Orion-Avto Mykolaiv	6	5	0	1	17	5	+12	15	Qualified to Persha Liha play-offs
2	Spartak Chernihiv	6	4	1	1	4	3	+1	13	Qualified to Persha Liha play-offs
3	SumDU-Barsa Sumy	6	2	1	3	7	9	−2	7	
4	Chornomorochka Odesa	6	0	0	6	2	13	−11	0	

Source: wfpl.com.ua
Rules for classification: 1) Points; 2) Head-to-head points; 3) Head-to-head goal difference; 4) Head-to-head goals scored; 5) Goal difference; 6) Goals scored.

==== Group 3 ====
Pos	Team	Pld	W	D	L	GF	GA	GD	Pts	
1	Luhanochka	8	7	0	1	34	5	+29	21	Qualified to Persha Liha play-offs
2	Zlahoda-Dnipro-1	8	5	1	2	15	8	+7	16	Qualified to Persha Liha play-offs
3	Mariupolchanka Mariupol	8	5	0	3	13	10	+3	15	
4	KDIuSSh-8 Kharkiv	8	2	1	5	9	18	−9	7	
5	Nika Pervomaiskyi Raion	8	0	0	8	2	32	−30	0	Withdrew

Source: wfpl.com.ua
Rules for classification: 1) Points; 2) Head-to-head points; 3) Head-to-head goal difference; 4) Head-to-head goals scored; 5) Goal difference; 6) Goals scored.

=== Final stage ===
The final stage consisted of the parts. First, there was a mini group stage, and then each team played off against a team that placed in the same position in another group. All matches took place in Vynnyky, Lviv.

==== Group 1 ====
Pos	Team	Pld	W	D	L	GF	GA	GD	Pts
1	Spartak Chernihiv	2	1	1	0	1	0	+1	4
2	Lvivianka Lviv	2	1	0	1	1	1	0	3
3	Luhanochka	2	0	1	1	0	1	−1	1

Source: wfpl.com.ua
Rules for classification: 1) Points; 2) Head-to-head points; 3) Head-to-head goal difference; 4) Head-to-head goals scored; 5) Goal difference; 6) Goals scored.

==== Group 2 ====
Pos	Team	Pld	W	D	L	GF	GA	GD	Pts
1	Zlahoda-Dnipro-1	2	2	0	0	4	1	+3	6
2	DIuSSh-3 Ivano-Frankivsk	2	1	0	1	6	4	+2	3
3	Orion-Avto Mykolaiv	2	0	0	2	2	7	−5	0

Source: wfpl.com.ua
Rules for classification: 1) Points; 2) Head-to-head points; 3) Head-to-head goal difference; 4) Head-to-head goals scored; 5) Goal difference; 6) Goals scored.

==== Play-offs ====
Fifth place

Team 1	Score	Team 2
Luhanochka	5 – 2	Orion-Avto Mykolaiv

Third place

Team 1	Score	Team 2
Lvivianka Lviv	3 – 0	DIuSSh-3 Ivano-Frankivsk

Final

Team 1	Score	Team 2
Spartak Chernihiv	2 – 1	Zlahoda-Dnipro-1

Spartak Chernihiv was crowned as the champions of the 2016 Persha Liha. Along with Zlahoda-Dnipro-1, they gained promotion to the Vyshcha Liha. However, instead of Spartak Chernihiv, FC Yednist Plysky was later admitted to the league.
