= Yunist Stadium (Chernihiv) =

Football stadium in Chernihiv, Ukraine

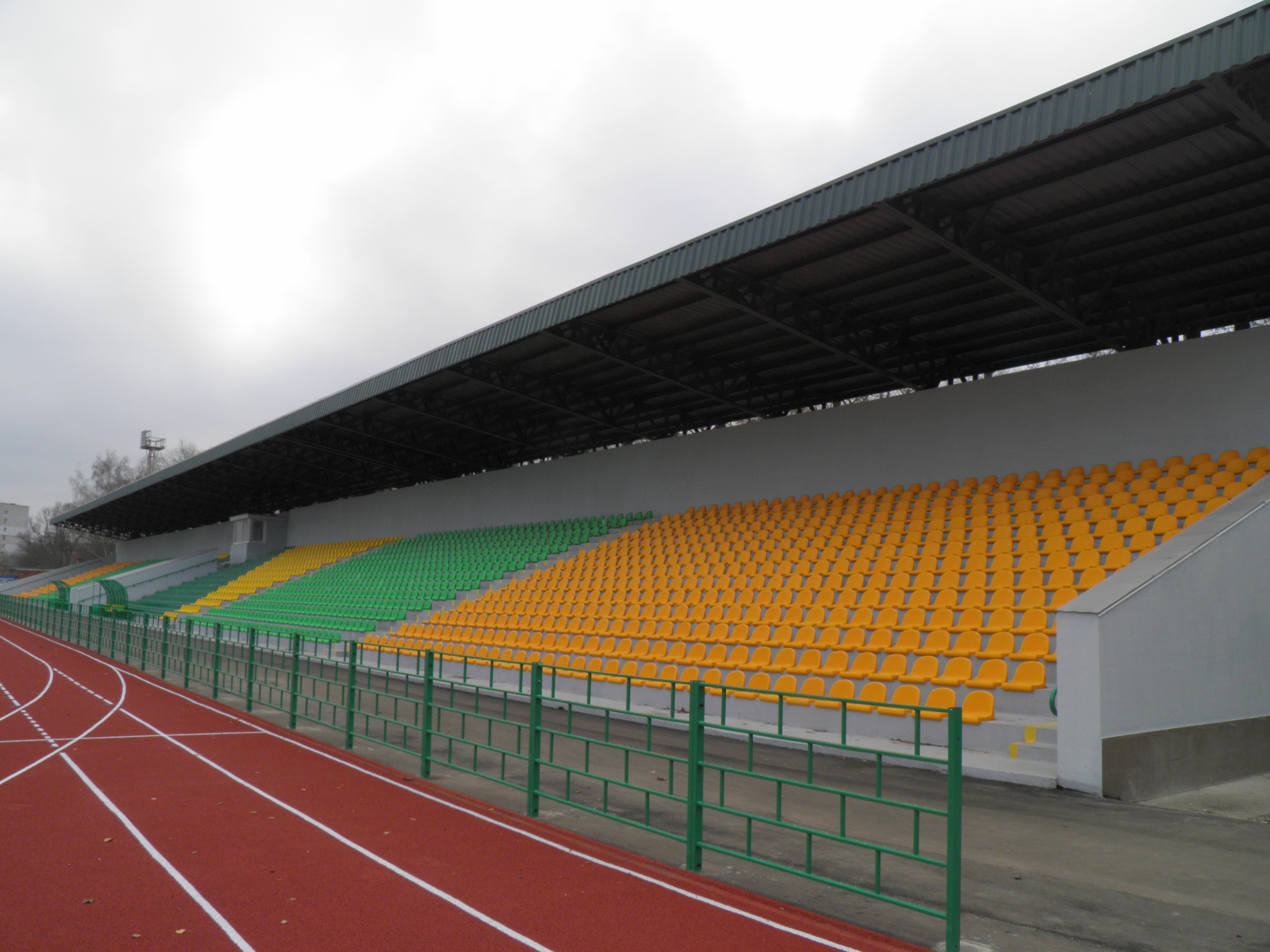
- Interactive map of Yunist Stadium
- Location: Victory Ave, 110 Chernihiv, Ukraine, 16624
- Coordinates: 51°30′2″N 31°18′11″E
- Owner: Ministry of Youth and Sports of Ukraine
- Capacity: 3000

Construction
- Opened: 1975
- Renovated: 2017-2020
- Expanded: 2020

Tenants
- FC Chernihiv; Olimpik Donetsk; Yunist Chernihiv; Yunist ShVSM Chernihiv; Spartak ShVSM Chernihiv; Kudrivka

Yunist Stadium (Ukrainian: Стадіон Юність) is a football stadium in Chernihiv, Ukraine. The stadium is a home arena for Yunist Chernihiv and Yunist ShVSM and it belongs to the Sportive youth school.

== General description ==
=== Origin ===
The stadium was opened in 1975 and it is located 1.5 km by Stadium Youri Gagarin, 2.5 km by Chernihiv Arena.

A number of notable players started at the Youth Academy, playing in this stadium, such as Andriy Yarmolenko, Pavlo Polehenko, Vladyslav Shapoval, Pavlo Fedosov, Oleksiy Khoblenko and Nika Sichinava. In 2015 Andriy Yarmolenko and Berezenko played for the Chernihiv team to mark the opening of a new football field.

=== Reconstruction ===
In 2017, work on the reconstruction of the new stadium began. Tribunes for 3,000 seats were made at the stadium, the football field was covered with artificial turf, and the athletics tracks were made of rubber. The basement, where the medical center, locker rooms and arbitrators' rooms are located, has been repaired. The reconstruction of the Yunost Stadium cost ₴55 million in 2019.

In 2019, the Yunost Stadium was completed, becoming a modern sports facility for the children's and youth school of the Olympic football reserve. The football field became one of high quality artificial turf. There are also rubber athletics tracks, a mini-soccer field, a long-jump track and stands containing a total of 3,000 spectator seats. The basement, where the medical center, locker rooms and arbitrators' rooms are located, has also been renovated.

In 2020 Dmitry Adehiro created a mural with the image of Andriy Yarmolenko, during the reconstruction of the building of the Yunost Youth Sports School, just beside the Stadium.

=== Expanded ===
After the election of Volodymyr Zelenskyy as President of Ukraine, the sports facility was included in the "Great Construction" and there began an additional stage of reconstruction of the thermal modernization of the building itself. Initially, a complete reconstruction of the stadium's basement was carried out, including the installation of: a football field with an artificial surface of the latest generation, measuring 105 x 68 metres; athletics tracks; an electronic scoreboard; and covered stands. A total of ₴51 million were spent, of which ₴44 million were funds from the State Fund for Regional Development, and ₴7 million were funds from the local budget. As for the "Big Construction", at the expense of a subvention for the socio-economic development of certain areas in 2020, the sports school was overhauled with a total cost of ₴4.1 million. Windows and doors were completely replaced with energy-saving ones, new lighting was installed in gyms, the floor was partially replaced and the facade was repaired and decorated with two murals. In 2020, Dmitry Adehiro created a mural with the image of Andriy Yarmolenko, during the reconstruction of the building of the Yunost Youth Sports School, just beside the Stadium. On 10 December 2020, for World Football Day, a sports complex of a special child-youth school and an Olympic reserve for football "Yunist" was opened. President of the Ukrainian Association for Football Andriy Pavelko was present at the opening ceremony, as were Anatoliy Demyanenko and Oleh Protasov.

=== Museum and new tenants ===
In addition, the sports complex now has the Museum of Football History of Chernihiv Oblast, where in which a stand about the same Andriy Yarmolenko took a prominent place. His parents were invited to inaugurate the museum and his mother recollected that Andriy began to play with the ball from the age of 4–5 years. "In the beginning he did not even have a proper ball, so had to play with a self-made one. We were poor and real football was a luxury in those times". Due to the war in Donbas, the club of Olimpik Donetsk had to play in a different stadium and in October 2021 played in the stadium within the Ukrainian First League, against Kramatorsk in the season 2021-22 and started to use it as one of its home stadia. The club also played the 13 November 2021 match against Nyva Ternopil in the stadium, with the option to play there all season. At the modern Yunost Stadium, on a sunny and warm October day 2021, Chernihiv hosted the Open Football Lessons project of the Ukrainian Football Association and the Football Development of Ukraine Charitable Foundation. The festival was organized by the Chernihiv Regional Football Association and educators of Chernihiv and the region. In 2021 a competition for the Andriy Yarmolenko Cup in honour of Andriy Yarmolenko took place at the Yunist Stadium. In summer 2022 the second main team FC Chernihiv, was promoted in Ukrainian First League and the club opted to use the Yunist Stadium.

== Main uses ==
- The stadium will be used by FC Chernihiv, in the Ukrainian First League, in the season 2022-23.
- The stadium was used by Olimpik Donetsk, in the Ukrainian First League, in the season 2021-22.
- The stadium is used by Yunist Chernihiv and Yunist ShVSM
- In the past the stadium was also used by women's football club Spartak ShVSM Chernihiv
- The stadium is also used by Desna Chernihiv and FC Chernihiv as a training ground.

== Matches ==
=== Official matches ===
From October 2021 until November 2021, Olimpik Donetsk was granted permission to play in the Yunist Stadium in Chernihiv due to the war in Donbas.

Date	Time	Team #1	Result	Team #2	Competition	Note
8 April 2023	12:00	(Ukraine) FC Chernihiv	2–1	(Ukraine) Mariupol	Ukrainian First League	
5 November 2022	12:00	(Ukraine) FC Chernihiv	0–1	(Ukraine) Poltava	Ukrainian First League	
5 November 2022	12:00	(Ukraine) FC Chernihiv	0–0	(Ukraine) Metalurh Zaporizhzhia	Ukrainian First League	
23 October 2022	12:00	(Ukraine) FC Chernihiv	2–1	(Ukraine) Hirnyk-Sport Horishni Plavni	Ukrainian First League	
8 October 2022	12:00	(Ukraine) FC Chernihiv	0–2	(Ukraine) LNZ Cherkasy	Ukrainian First League	
25 September 2022	12:00	(Ukraine) FC Chernihiv	0–2	(Ukraine) Kremin Kremenchuk	Ukrainian First League	
10 September 2022	12:00	(Ukraine) FC Chernihiv	0–1	(Ukraine) Obolon Kyiv	Ukrainian First League	
27 August 2022	12:00	(Ukraine) FC Chernihiv	1–1	(Ukraine) Skoruk Tomakivka	Ukrainian First League	
26 November 2021	12:30	(Ukraine) Olimpik Donetsk	0–1	(Ukraine) Hirnyk-Sport Horishni Plavni	Ukrainian First League	
13 November 2021	12:30	(Ukraine) Olimpik Donetsk	0–1	(Ukraine) Nyva Ternopil	Ukrainian First League	
20 October 2021	12:30	(Ukraine) Olimpik Donetsk	1–0	(Ukraine) VPK-Ahro Shevchenkivka	Ukrainian First League	
5 October 2021	12:30	(Ukraine) Olimpik Donetsk	3–1	(Ukraine) Kramatorsk	Ukrainian First League	

=== Derby match ===
On 5 February 2022 the first friendly derby match was held in the stadium, between the two main clubs of the city of Chernihiv.

Date	Time	Team #1	Result	Team #2	Competition	Note
5 February 2022	12:30	(Ukraine) FC Chernihiv	1–0	(Ukraine) Desna Chernihiv	Friendly match	

== Gallery ==
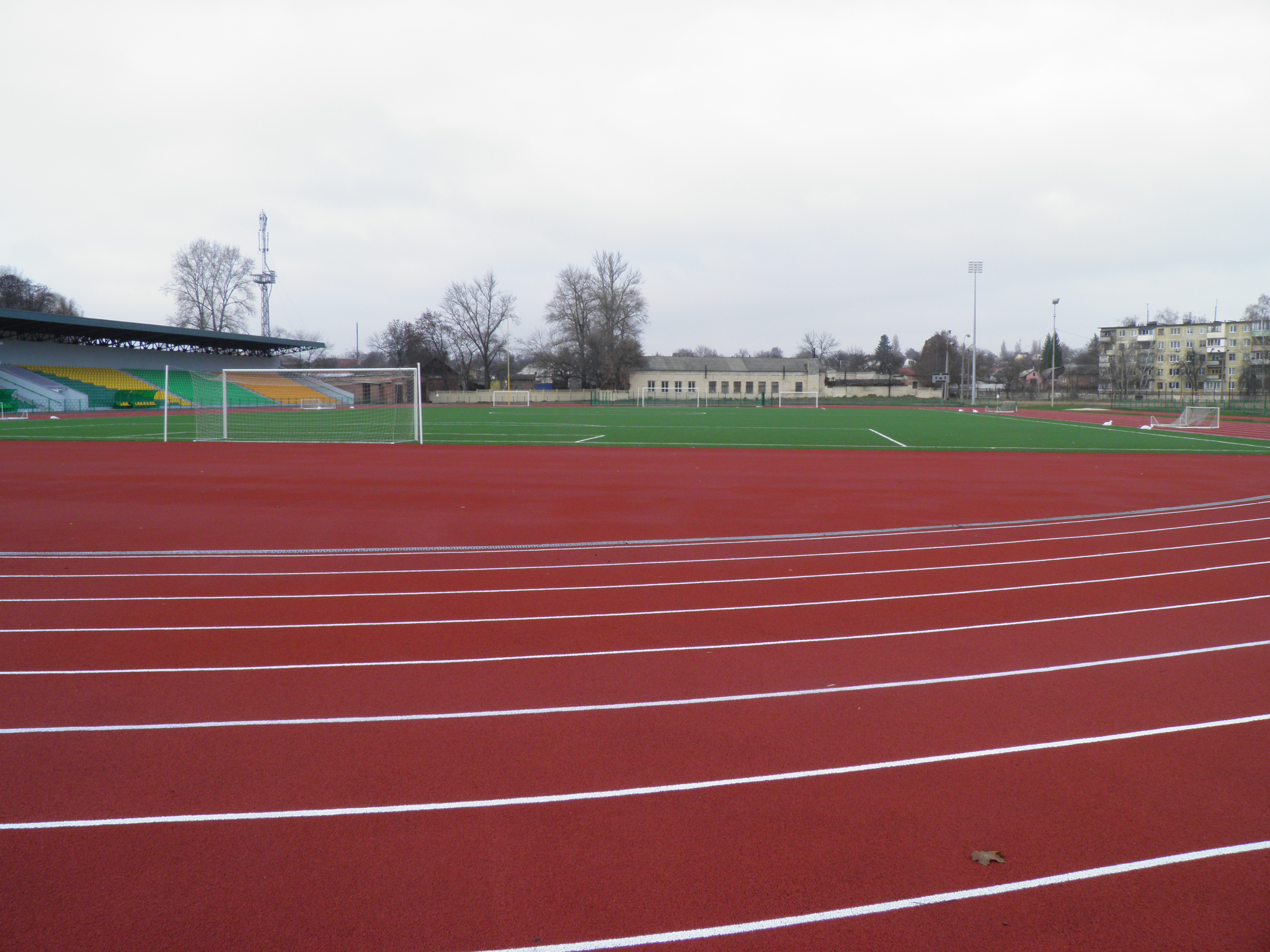
View of the pitch, athletics track and grandstands

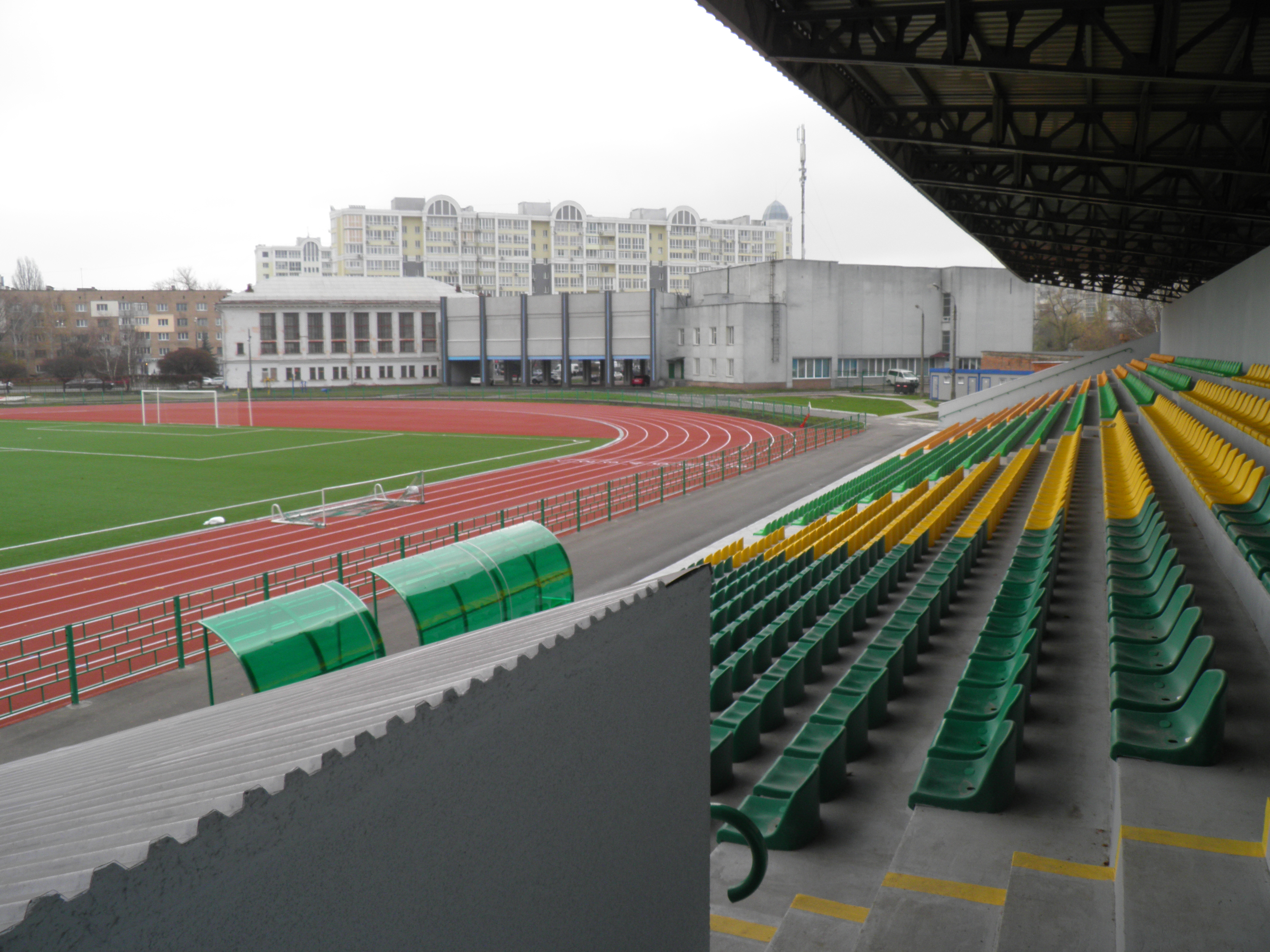
View of the field from the stands

== See also ==
- Yunist Stadium
- List of sports venues in Chernihiv
