= List of international goals scored by Andriy Yarmolenko =

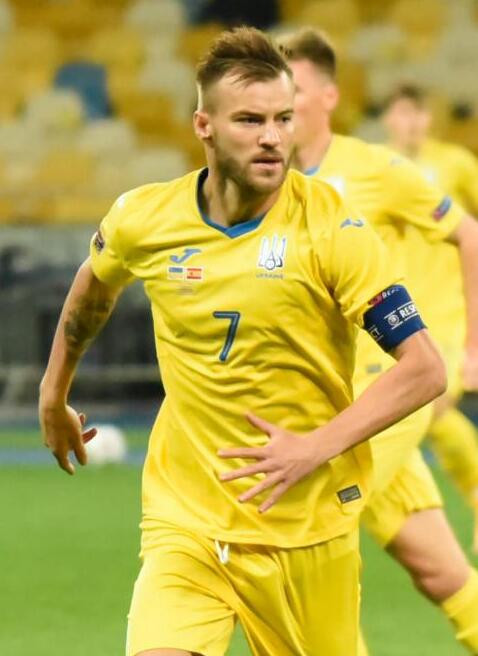
Andriy Yarmolenko playing for Ukraine in 2020

Andriy Yarmolenko is a Ukrainian professional footballer who has represented the Ukraine national football team since his debut in 2009. Since then, Yarmolenko has scored 47 goals in 126 international appearances, making him the country's second-highest goalscorer behind Andriy Shevchenko.

== International goals ==
As of match played 31 May 2026
Scores and results list Ukraine's goal tally first; score column indicates score after each Yarmolenko goal.

List of international goals scored by Andriy Yarmolenko
No.	Date	Venue	Opponent	Score	Result	Competition	Ref.
1	5 September 2009	Valeriy Lobanovskyi Dynamo Stadium, Kyiv, Ukraine	Andorra	1–0	5–0	2010 FIFA World Cup qualification	
2	14 October 2009	Estadi Comunal d'Andorra la Vella, Andorra la Vella, Andorra	Andorra	6–0	6–0	2010 FIFA World Cup qualification	
3	17 November 2010	Stade de Genève, Geneva, Switzerland	Switzerland	1–1	2–2	Friendly	
4	2 September 2011	Metalist Oblast Sports Complex, Kharkiv, Ukraine	Uruguay	1–0	2–3	Friendly	
5	7 October 2011	Metalist Oblast Sports Complex, Kharkiv, Ukraine	Bulgaria	3–0	3–0	Friendly	
6	11 November 2011	Olimpiyskiy National Sports Complex, Kyiv, Ukraine	Germany	1–0	3–3	Friendly	
7	29 February 2012	HaMoshava Stadium, Petah Tikva, Israel	Israel	3–1	3–2	Friendly	
8	28 May 2012	Kufstein Arena, Kufstein, Austria	Estonia	1–0	4–0	Friendly	
9	6 February 2013	Estadio de La Cartuja, Seville, Spain	Norway	2–0	2–0	Friendly	
10	22 March 2013	National Stadium, Warsaw, Poland	Poland	1–0	3–1	2014 FIFA World Cup qualification	
11	26 March 2013	Chornomorets Stadium, Odesa, Ukraine	Moldova	1–0	2–1	2014 FIFA World Cup qualification	
12	11 October 2013	Metalist Oblast Sports Complex, Kharkiv, Ukraine	Poland	1–0	1–0	2014 FIFA World Cup qualification	
13	15 October 2013	San Marino Stadium, Serravalle, San Marino	San Marino	5–0	8–0	2014 FIFA World Cup qualification	
14	15 November 2013	Olimpiyskiy National Sports Complex, Kyiv, Ukraine	France	2–0	2–0	2014 FIFA World Cup qualification	
15	5 March 2014	Antonis Papadopoulos Stadium, Larnaca, Cyprus	United States	1–0	2–0	Friendly	
16	15 November 2014	Stade Josy Barthel, Luxembourg, Luxembourg	Luxembourg	1–0	3–0	UEFA Euro 2016 qualifying	
17	15 November 2014	Stade Josy Barthel, Luxembourg, Luxembourg	Luxembourg	2–0	3–0	UEFA Euro 2016 qualifying	
18	15 November 2014	Stade Josy Barthel, Luxembourg, Luxembourg	Luxembourg	3–0	3–0	UEFA Euro 2016 qualifying	
19	31 March 2015	Arena Lviv, Lviv, Ukraine	Latvia	1–0	1–1	Friendly	
20	5 September 2015	Arena Lviv, Lviv, Ukraine	Belarus	2–0	3–1	UEFA Euro 2016 qualifying	
21	14 November 2015	Arena Lviv, Lviv, Ukraine	Slovenia	1–0	2–0	UEFA Euro 2016 qualifying	
22	17 November 2015	Stožice Stadium, Ljubljana, Slovenia	Slovenia	1–1	1–1	UEFA Euro 2016 qualifying	
23	28 March 2016	Olimpiyskiy National Sports Complex, Kyiv, Ukraine	Wales	1–0	1–0	Friendly	
24	29 May 2016	Stadio Olimpico Grande Torino, Turin, Italy	Romania	4–1	4–3	Friendly	
25	3 June 2016	Stadio Atleti Azzurri d'Italia, Bergamo, Italy	Albania	2–1	3–1	Friendly	
26	5 September 2016	Olimpiyskiy National Sports Complex, Kyiv, Ukraine	Iceland	1–1	1–1	2018 FIFA World Cup qualification	
27	6 October 2016	Torku Arena, Konya, Turkey	Turkey	1–0	2–2	2018 FIFA World Cup qualification	
28	9 October 2016	Marshal Józef Piłsudski Stadium, Kraków, Poland	Kosovo	2–0	3–0	2018 FIFA World Cup qualification	
29	15 November 2016	Metalist Oblast Sports Complex, Kharkiv, Ukraine	Serbia	2–0	2–0	Friendly	
30	2 September 2017	Metalist Oblast Sports Complex, Kharkiv, Ukraine	Turkey	1–0	2–0	2018 FIFA World Cup qualification	
31	2 September 2017	Metalist Oblast Sports Complex, Kharkiv, Ukraine	Turkey	2–0	2–0	2018 FIFA World Cup qualification	
32	6 October 2017	Loro Boriçi Stadium, Shkodër, Albania	Kosovo	2–0	2–0	2018 FIFA World Cup qualification	
33	10 November 2017	Arena Lviv, Lviv, Ukraine	Slovakia	1–1	2–1	Friendly	
34	3 June 2018	Stade Camille Fournier, Évian-les-Bains, France	Albania	2–0	4–1	Friendly	
35	3 June 2018	Stade Camille Fournier, Évian-les-Bains, France	Albania	3–0	4–1	Friendly	
36	9 September 2018	Arena Lviv, Lviv, Ukraine	Slovakia	1–0	1–0	2018–19 UEFA Nations League B	
37	14 October 2019	Olimpiyskiy National Sports Complex, Kyiv, Ukraine	Portugal	2–0	2–1	UEFA Euro 2020 qualifying	
38	3 September 2020	Arena Lviv, Lviv, Ukraine	Switzerland	1–0	2–1	2020–21 UEFA Nations League A	
39	7 June 2021	Metalist Oblast Sports Complex, Kharkiv, Ukraine	Cyprus	1–0	4–0	Friendly	
40	7 June 2021	Metalist Oblast Sports Complex, Kharkiv, Ukraine	Cyprus	4–0	4–0	Friendly	
41	13 June 2021	Johan Cruyff Arena, Amsterdam, Netherlands	Netherlands	1–2	2–3	UEFA Euro 2020	
42	17 June 2021	Arena Națională, Bucharest, Romania	North Macedonia	1–0	2–1	UEFA Euro 2020	
43	9 October 2021	Helsinki Olympic Stadium, Helsinki, Finland	Finland	1–0	2–1	2022 FIFA World Cup qualification	
44	12 October 2021	Arena Lviv, Lviv, Ukraine	Bosnia and Herzegovina	1–0	1–1	2022 FIFA World Cup qualification	
45	1 June 2022	Hampden Park, Glasgow, Scotland	Scotland	1–0	3–1	2022 FIFA World Cup qualification	
46	12 September 2023	San Siro, Milan, Italy	Italy	1–2	1–2	UEFA Euro 2024 qualifying	
47	31 May 2026	Tarczyński Arena Wrocław, Wrocław, Poland	Poland	2–0	2–0	Friendly	

== Statistics ==
As of match played 31 May 2026

Appearances and goals by national team and year
National team	Year	Apps	Goals
Ukraine	2009	6	2
Ukraine	2010	2	1
Ukraine	2011	9	3
Ukraine	2012	10	2
Ukraine	2013	11	6
Ukraine	2014	8	4
Ukraine	2015	9	4
Ukraine	2016	12	7
Ukraine	2017	8	4
Ukraine	2018	5	3
Ukraine	2019	6	1
Ukraine	2020	6	1
Ukraine	2021	14	6
Ukraine	2022	6	1
Ukraine	2023	4	1
Ukraine	2024	8	0
Ukraine	2025	1	0
Ukraine	2026	1	1
Total		126	47

== See also ==
- List of top international men's football goal scorers by country
