= Andriy Yarmolenko =

Ukrainian footballer (born 1989)

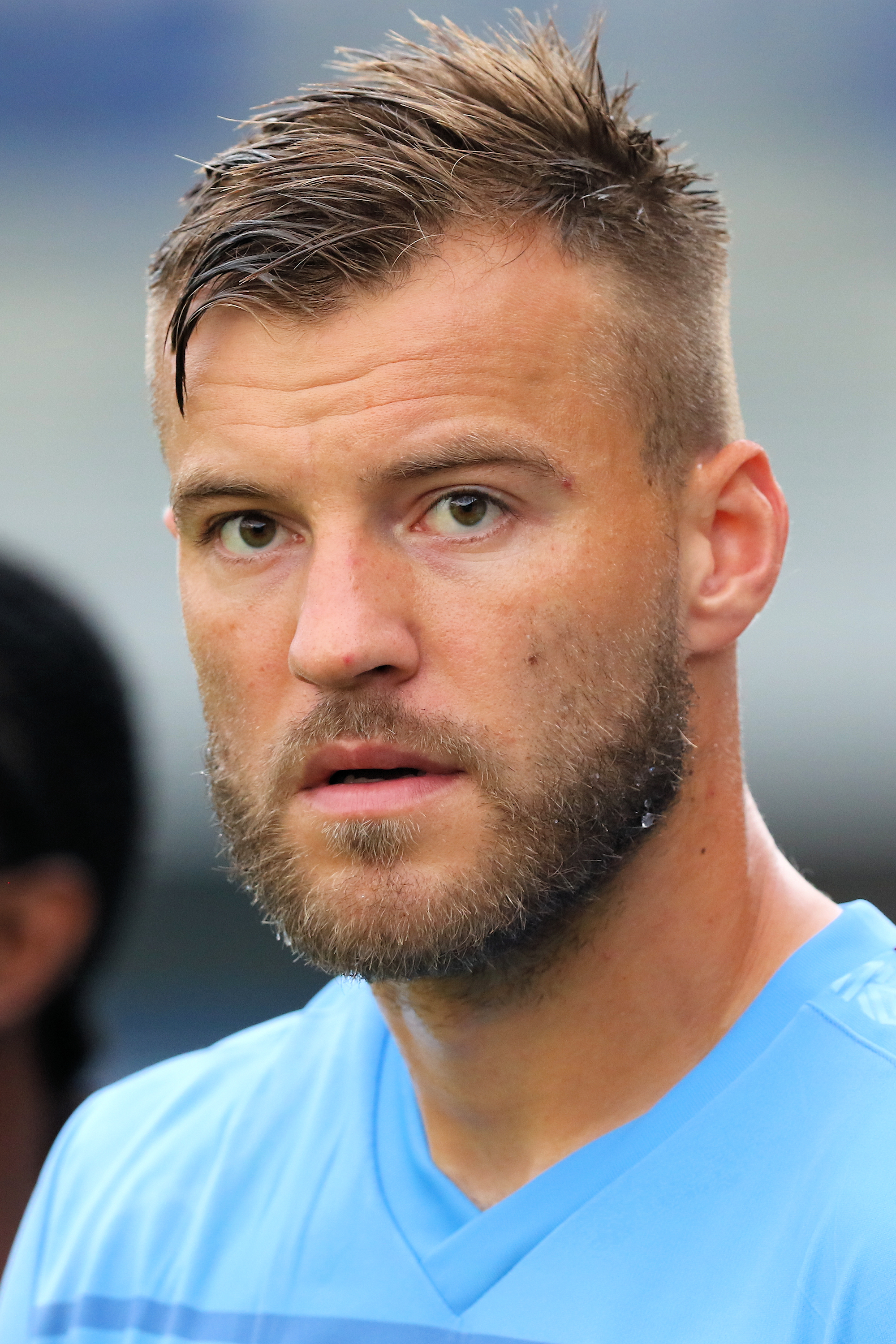
- Yarmolenko with West Ham United in 2019

Personal information
- Full name: Andriy Mykolayovych Yarmolenko
- Date of birth: 23 October 1989 (age 37)
- Place of birth: Leningrad, Russian SFSR, Soviet Union
- Height: 1.89 m (6 ft 2 in)
- Position: Winger

Team information
- Current team: Dynamo Kyiv
- Number: 7

Youth career
- 2002: Yunist Chernihiv
- 2002–2003: SDYuShOR Desna
- 2003–2004: Lokomotyv Kyiv
- 2003: Vidradnyi Kyiv
- 2004–2006: Yunist Chernihiv

Senior career*
Years	Team	Apps	(Gls)
2006–2007	Desna Chernihiv	9	(4)
2007–2008	Dynamo-2 Kyiv	37	(9)
2008–2017	Dynamo Kyiv	228	(99)
2017–2018	Borussia Dortmund	18	(3)
2018–2022	West Ham United	66	(8)
2022–2023	Al Ain	23	(11)
2023–	Dynamo Kyiv	69	(25)

International career^{‡}
2007–2008	Ukraine U19	14	(5)
2008–2011	Ukraine U21	16	(3)
2009–	Ukraine	127	(47)
- * Club domestic league appearances and goals as of 23 October 2026 ‡ National team caps and goals as of 2 October 2026

Andriy Mykolayovych Yarmolenko (Ukrainian: Андрі́й Микола́йович Ярмо́ленко; born 23 October 1989) is a Ukrainian professional footballer who plays as a winger or forward for Ukrainian Premier League club Dynamo Kyiv and captains the Ukraine national team.

Yarmolenko has been a full international for Ukraine since 2009, scoring 47 goals in 126 matches and playing at the UEFA European Championship in 2012, 2016, 2020 and 2024.

== Early life ==
Yarmolenko's parents, native Ukrainians, were originally from Smolianka village, Kulykivka Raion, Chernihiv Oblast. After their marriage, Valentyna and Mykola Yarmolenko moved to Leningrad where Andriy was born in 1989. He has a younger sister. After a period of three years (following the dissolution of the Soviet Union), the family moved back to their native country and settled in the city of Chernihiv.

His mother recollected that Andriy began to play with the ball from the age of 4–5 years. "In the beginning he did not even have a proper ball, so had to play with a self-made one. We were poor and real football was a luxury in those times". Yarmolenko was noticed by Mykola Lypoviy who invited him to football school (Youth Sports School "Yunist" in Chernihiv) and became his first coach.

== Club career ==
=== Early career ===
Yarmolenko is a graduate of the Chernihiv Youth Sports School "Yunist". He joined the Dynamo Kyiv Youth Academy aged 13. However, he returned to Chernihiv after a year being unable to meet physical requirements in training. Before his move to Dynamo Kyiv in 2007, he played for Yunist Chernihiv, Desna Chernihiv, Lokomotyv Kyiv, Vidradnyi Kyiv and again Yunist Chernihiv

=== Desna Chernihiv ===
In the summer 2006, from Yunist Chernihiv, he joined to Desna Chernihiv, the main club in Chernihiv, under the coach Oleksandr Tomakh. Here he played in the season 2006–07 in Ukrainian First League, where he made nine appearances and scored four goals.

=== Dynamo Kyiv ===
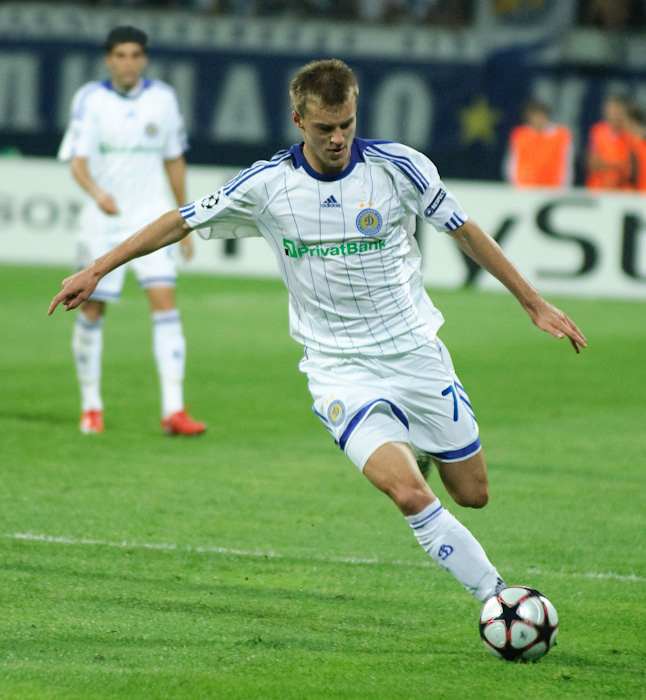
Yarmolenko playing for Dynamo Kyiv in 2009

In 2007, Yarmolenko signed a five-year contract with Ukrainian club Dynamo Kyiv, where he joined its second team, Dynamo-2, which plays in lower leagues, for a couple of seasons. The talented youngster was praised as the "new Andriy Shevchenko" by journalists, who noted his qualities of good physique, shot and especially his speed. The then vice-president of Dynamo, Yozhef Sabo, also praised the youngster, saying, "Yarmolenko has all the makings to become a top-level player."

On 11 May 2008, Yarmolenko debuted for Dynamo's first team in an away match against Vorskla Poltava and scored the winning goal in Kyiv's 2–1 victory. He scored 7 goals in 21 games in his first season and 11 in 19 in his second. He is now regularly used as a left or centre forward.

In a match in October 2015, Yarmolenko committed a dangerous challenge which almost broke Shakhtar Donetsk player Taras Stepanenko's leg. The two reconciled after the game and exchanged jerseys, but afterwards Yarmolenko threw Stepanenko's shirt on the ground while he thanked the Dynamo fans. In the Shakhtar–Dynamo derby in April 2016, after the former won 3–0, Stepanenko stepped in front of the Dynamo fans kissing his Shakhtar badge. In a brawl that escalated, Yarmolenko kicked Stepanenko to the ground.

=== Borussia Dortmund ===
On 28 August 2017, Yarmolenko signed a four-year contract with Borussia Dortmund. On 10 September 2017, he made his debut for Dortmund as a substitute in the 79-minute against Freiburg. He then got his first start for Dortmund against Tottenham Hotspur in a Champions League fixture, where he scored Dortmund's only goal in the 3–1 defeat.

=== West Ham United ===
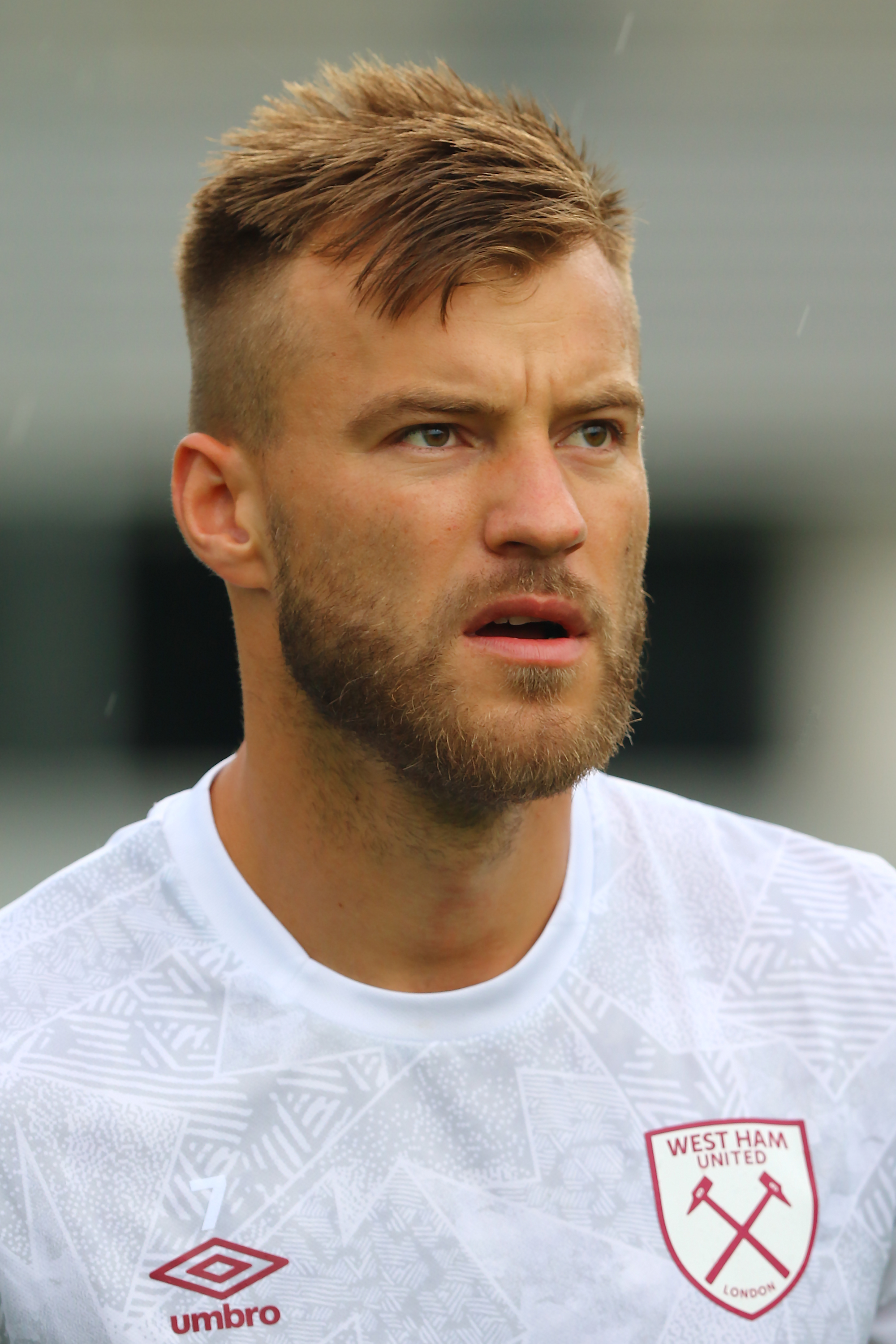
Yarmolenko with West Ham United in 2019

On 11 July 2018, Yarmolenko signed for Premier League club West Ham United on a four-year contract for an undisclosed fee. He made his debut on 12 August in a 4–0 defeat by Liverpool. Making his first start for West Ham on 16 September, he scored his first two goals for the club in a 3–1 away win against Everton, the club's first Premier League win of the 2018–19 season. Yarmolenko suffered an Achilles tear on 20 October 2018 in a 1–0 loss against Tottenham Hotspur, which ruled him out for the remainder of the season.

Yarmolenko returned to the first team squad for the start of the 2019–20 season. On 31 August 2019, he scored his first goal since his return from injury, doubling West Ham's lead with a left-footed volley in a 2–0 win over Norwich City. He scored again in West Ham's next home match in the Premier League, opening the scoring in their 2–0 defeat of Manchester United. In December 2019 he tore his adductor muscle and had still not returned to playing when football was suspended due to the COVID-19 pandemic in March 2020. He returned to training in May 2020 and on 1 July 2020, in his second appearance since 2019, he scored the winning goal against Chelsea in a 3–2 win.

On 25 November 2021, Yarmolenko scored against Rapid Wien at the Allianz Stadion and provided the penalty for the 2–0 away win for West Ham in the UEFA Europa League group stage. Following the Russian invasion of Ukraine in February 2022, Yarmolenko was given time off by manager David Moyes. He returned on 13 March, substituting an injured Michail Antonio and scoring the opening goal in a 2–1 victory over Aston Villa. Four days later, Yarmolenko scored an extra-time winner for West Ham in their 2–1 aggregate win over Spanish club Sevilla in the Europa League round of 16, allowing West Ham to progress to a European quarter-final for the first time since 1981. In May 2022, West Ham announced that Yarmolenko would be allowed to leave at the end of his current contract in June 2022.

=== Al-Ain ===
On 13 July 2022, Yarmolenko signed for the United Arab Emirates club Al-Ain on a one-year contract.

=== Return to Dynamo Kyiv ===
On 27 June 2023, Yarmolenko returned to Dynamo Kyiv, signing a two-year contract. On 21 May 2025, Dynamo announced that they had extended their contract with Yarmolenko for another season. On 29 May 2026, Yarmolenko again signed a one year extension with Dynamo.

On 2 November 2026, Yarmolenko scored his 125th goal in the Ukrainian Premier League, overtaking Maksim Shatskikh as the all time top goal scorer in the competition.

== International career ==
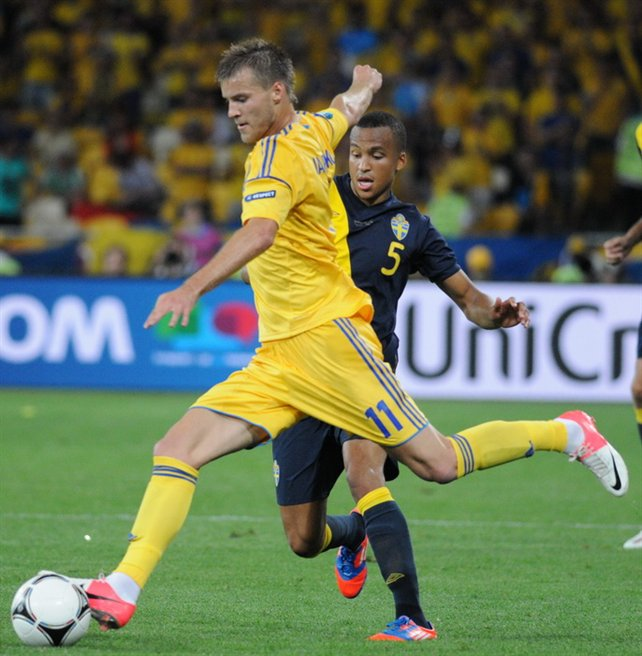
Yarmolenko playing for Ukraine at UEFA Euro 2012

On 11 August 2007 Yarmolenko represented Ukraine under-19 team in an away exhibition game against Japan, winning 1–0. He also participated in the 2008 UEFA European Under-19 Championship qualification.

After the qualification on 10 October 2008, Yarmolenko was invited to the under-21 squad which played against the Netherlands. He later participated in qualification and finals of the 2011 UEFA European Under-21 Football Championship.

On 5 September 2009, in the 2010 FIFA World Cup qualification game against Andorra, Yarmolenko made his first senior appearance for Ukraine and scored in a 5–0 win. On 2 September 2011, in an international friendly against Uruguay in Kharkiv, Yarmolenko set a national team record by scoring 14 seconds into the match, the fastest time in which a Ukraine national team player has scored a goal.

Yarmolenko scored a hat-trick on 15 November 2014, netting all of Ukraine's goals in a 3–0 victory away to Luxembourg in UEFA Euro 2016 qualifying. In November 2015, Yarmolenko scored in both legs of Ukraine's 3–1 play-off victory over Slovenia to qualify the nation for Euro 2016 final stages. Yarmolenko was subsequently included in Ukraine's squad for Euro 2016, where he played in all three matches as Ukraine failed to score and finished bottom of the group. Yarmolenko scored against Netherlands at Johan Cruyff Arena in Amsterdam and against North Macedonia at Arena Națională in Bucharest for UEFA Euro 2020 and he has been elected Star of the Match.

On 1 September 2021, Yarmolenko played his 100th game for Ukraine, in a 2022 World Cup qualification game against Kazakhstan. On 12 October 2021 he scored against Bosnia and Herzegovina at Arena Lviv in Lviv and was voted player of the match.

On 5 June 2022, Yarmolenko deflected a free-kick by Gareth Bale past goalkeeper, Heorhiy Bushchan as Wales qualified for their first World Cup since 1958. Initially awarded as an own goal, it was later awarded to Bale at the end of June.

In May 2024, Yarmolenko was called up to represent Ukraine at UEFA Euro 2024.

== Coaching career ==
On 20 September 2024, Yarmolenko received his UEFA "A" coaching license by successfully completing the coaching courses in Kyiv, Ukraine.

== Personal life ==
Yarmolenko has three sons with his wife Inna.

In 2020, Dmitry Adehiro created a mural with the image of Yarmolenko, during the reconstruction of the building of the Yunost Youth Sports School, just beside the Yunist Stadium in Chernihiv.

On 7 October 2021, together with Igor Cheredinov (the trainer of Olena Kostevych), he was elected an honorary citizen of Chernihiv.

In November 2021, a competition for the Andriy Yarmolenko Cup took place in the city of Chernihiv at the Yunist Stadium.

In February 2022, Yarmolenko gave £75,000 to the Armed Forces of Ukraine to help defend the country in the wake of Russia's invasion. He also flew to the Ukraine border to rescue his wife and child after they fled the country following the invasion, according to former Ukrainian international Andriy Shevchenko. Chernihiv mayor Vladyslav Atroshenko and the governor of the Chernihiv Oblast Vyacheslav Chaus thanked Yarmolenko personally for his efforts.

Yarmolenko helped save Roman Yaremchuk's wife's parents. The striker of the national team of Ukraine and Benfica, currently playing for Olympiacos (Greece), Roman Yaremchuk told how his wife's parents were able to be taken out of Chernihiv with the help of Andriy Yarmolenko. "I turned to Andriy Yarmolenko, knowing that he was from Chernihiv, and said, "Help me as much as you can, thank you." Of course, Andriy responded to my request and two days later they were taken away. The situation was quite difficult," Yaremchuk said.

In March 2022, after scoring the winner for West Ham over Spanish club Sevilla in the Europa League to secure the club into the quarter-finals of the competition, Yarmolenko gave his West Ham shirt to a fan holding a Ukraine flag.

In May 2022, Yarmolenko presented an ambulance to his hometown Chernihiv, sending it directly from London.

== Career statistics ==
=== Club ===
As of match played 23 October 2026

Appearances and goals by club, season and competition
Club	Season	League			National cup (Note: Includes Ukrainian Cup, DFB-Pokal, FA Cup, UAE President's Cup)		League cup (Note: Includes EFL Cup, UAE League Cup)		Continental		Other		Total	
Club	Season	Division	Apps	Goals	Apps	Goals	Apps	Goals	Apps	Goals	Apps	Goals	Apps	Goals
Desna Chernihiv	2006–07	Ukrainian First League	9	4	1	0	—		—		—		10	4
Dynamo-2 Kyiv	2006–07	Ukrainian First League	15	4	—		—		—		—		15	4
Dynamo-2 Kyiv	2007–08	Ukrainian First League	22	5	—		—		—		—		22	5
Dynamo-2 Kyiv	Total		37	9	—		—		—		—		37	9
Dynamo Kyiv	2007–08	Vyshcha Liha	1	1	0	0	—		0	0	0	0	1	1
Dynamo Kyiv	2008–09	Ukrainian Premier League	10	0	3	5	—		0	0	1 (Note: Appearance in Ukrainian Super Cup)	0	14	5
Dynamo Kyiv	2009–10	Ukrainian Premier League	28	7	2	0	—		6 (Note: Appearances in UEFA Champions League)	0	1	0	37	7
Dynamo Kyiv	2010–11	Ukrainian Premier League	26	11	5	1	—		16 (Note: Four appearances and one goal in UEFA Champions League, twelve appearances and three goals in UEFA Europa League)	4	—		47	16
Dynamo Kyiv	2011–12	Ukrainian Premier League	28	12	1	1	—		10 (Note: Two appearances in UEFA Champions League, eight appearances in UEFA Europa League)	0	1	0	40	13
Dynamo Kyiv	2012–13	Ukrainian Premier League	27	11	1	0	—		12 (Note: Ten appearances and two goals in UEFA Champions League, two appearances in UEFA Europa League)	2	—		40	13
Dynamo Kyiv	2013–14	Ukrainian Premier League	26	12	4	4	—		9 (Note: Appearances in UEFA Europa League)	5	—		39	21
Dynamo Kyiv	2014–15	Ukrainian Premier League	26	14	5	1	—		11	4	1	0	43	19
Dynamo Kyiv	2015–16	Ukrainian Premier League	23	13	3	4	—		7	2	1	0	34	19
Dynamo Kyiv	2016–17	Ukrainian Premier League	28	15	3	3	—		5	1	—		36	19
Dynamo Kyiv	2017–18	Ukrainian Premier League	5	3	0	0	—		4 (Note: Two appearances and one goal in UEFA Champions League, two appearances in UEFA Europa League)	1	1	0	10	4
Dynamo Kyiv	Total		228	99	27	19	—		80	19	6	0	341	137
Borussia Dortmund	2017–18	Bundesliga	18	3	2	2	—		6	1	—		26	6
West Ham United	2018–19	Premier League	9	2	0	0	1	0	—		—		10	2
West Ham United	2019–20	Premier League	23	5	0	0	0	0	—		—		23	5
West Ham United	2020–21	Premier League	15	0	3	1	3	2	—		—		21	3
West Ham United	2021–22	Premier League	19	1	2	0	3	0	8	2	—		32	3
West Ham United	Total		66	8	5	1	7	2	8	2	—		86	13
Al Ain	2022–23	UAE Pro League	23	11	5	0	4	1	—		1 (Note: Appearance in UAE Super Cup)	0	33	12
Dynamo Kyiv	2023–24	Ukrainian Premier League	17	8	1	0	—		2 (Note: Appearances in UEFA Europa Conference League)	0	—		20	8
Dynamo Kyiv	2024–25	Ukrainian Premier League	21	7	3	1	—		9 (Note: Six appearances and two goals in UEFA Champions League, three appearances and two goals in UEFA Europa League)	4	—		33	12
Dynamo Kyiv	2025–26	Ukrainian Premier League	22	9	4	2	—		9 (Note: Three appearances in UEFA Champions League, two appearances in UEFA Europa League, four appearances and one goal in UEFA Conference League)	1	—		35	12
Dynamo Kyiv	2026–27	Ukrainian Premier League	9	1	0	0	—		3	0	—		12	1
Dynamo Kyiv	Total		69	25	8	3	—		23	5	—		100	33
Career total			448	158	46	24	11	3	117	27	7	0	633	214

=== International ===
As of match played 2 October 2026

Appearances and goals by national team and year
National team	Year	Apps	Goals
Ukraine	2009	6	2
Ukraine	2010	2	1
Ukraine	2011	9	3
Ukraine	2012	10	2
Ukraine	2013	11	6
Ukraine	2014	8	4
Ukraine	2015	9	4
Ukraine	2016	12	7
Ukraine	2017	8	4
Ukraine	2018	5	3
Ukraine	2019	6	1
Ukraine	2020	6	1
Ukraine	2021	14	6
Ukraine	2022	6	1
Ukraine	2023	4	1
Ukraine	2024	8	0
Ukraine	2025	1	0
Ukraine	2026	2	1
Total		127	47

== Honours ==
Dynamo Kyiv

- Ukrainian Premier League: 2008–09, 2014–15, 2015–16 2024–25
- Ukrainian Cup: 2013–14, 2014–15, 2025–26
- Ukrainian Super Cup: 2009, 2011, 2016

Individual

- Best Young Player of Ukraine: 2010, 2011
- Ukrainian Premier League Footballer of the Year: 2011, 2014
- Ukrainian Footballer of the Year: 2013, 2014, 2015, 2017
- Ukrainian Premier League Player of the Year: 2014–15, 2015–16, 2016–17
- Ukrainian Premier League Top scorer: 2016–17
- Football Stars of Ukraine – Best UPL player: 2016
- UEFA Europa League Top assist provider: 2014–15
- Ukrainian Premier League Joint All-Time top scorer: 125 goals

== See also ==
- List of men's footballers with 100 or more international caps
