= Nika Sichinava =

Georgian footballer

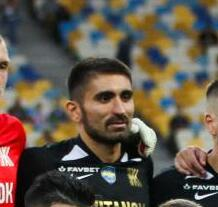

Personal information
- Date of birth: 17 August 1994 (age 32)
- Place of birth: Kutaisi, Georgia
- Height: 1.85 m (6 ft 1 in)
- Position: Forward

Team information
- Current team: Haka
- Number: 24

Youth career
- 2009–2011: Yunist Chernihiv

Senior career*
Years	Team	Apps	(Gls)
2011–2012	Retro Vatutine		
2012	Volgar Astrakhan	0	(0)
2013	Kolkheti-1913 Poti	4	(1)
2013–2014	WIT Georgia	31	(3)
2014–2016	Kolkheti-1913 Poti	38	(5)
2016–2021	Inhulets Petrove	124	(32)
2021–2023	Kolos Kovalivka	16	(1)
2022	→ KuPS (loan)	4	(0)
2023	Alay	10	(0)
2023	Pogoń-Sokół Lubaczów	3	(0)
2024	Ilves-Kissat	20	(7)
2024–2025	Sporting Kristina	5	(1)
2025	Słowianin Wolibórz	4	(0)
2025–	Haka	8	(0)
- * Club domestic league appearances and goals as of 20 September 2026

Nika Sichinava (Georgian: ნიკა სიჭინავა; born 17 August 1994) is a Georgian professional footballer who plays as a forward for Finnish club Haka.

== Club career ==
Sichinava is product of Yunist Chernihiv youth academy in Chernihiv, Ukraine. He made his debut at senior level for FC Retro Vatutine in 2011, moving to FC Volgar Astrakhan the following year.

=== WIT Georgia ===
From 2013 to 2015 Sichinava returned to Georgia, signing with WIT Georgia, where he played 31 games and scored 3 goals.

=== Kolkheti-1913 Poti ===
In 2014 he moved to Kolkheti-1913 Poti in the Umaglesi Liga for two seasons.

=== Inhulets Petrove ===
In 2016 Sichinava joined FC Inhulets Petrove. With the club he made it to the final of the 2018–19 Ukrainian Cup and got promoted to the 2019–20 Ukrainian First League.

On 19 September 2020, he scored his first goal in Ukrainian Premier League against Desna Chernihiv.

=== Kolos Kovalivka ===
In June 2021 he signed a three-year contract with Kolos Kovalivka in the Ukrainian Premier League and qualified for the 2021–22 Europa Conference League third qualifying round. On 24 July, he made his league debut with the team against Veres Rivne. On 5 August, he made his European debut against Shakhter Karagandy in the Europa Conference League third qualifying round, replacing Volodymyr Lysenko in the 54th minute. On 21 November he scored his first goal with the new club in Ukrainian Premier League against Desna Chernihiv.

==== Loan to KuPS ====
On 22 March 2022, Sichinava joined KuPS in Finland on loan until 30 June 2022, with an option to extend the loan until the end of 2022. On 2 April, he made his debut for the club in the Veikkausliiga.

=== Alay ===
In April 2023 he moved to Alay in Kyrgyz Premier League.

=== Pogoń-Sokół Lubaczów ===
On 10 October 2023, Polish IV liga club Pogoń-Sokół Lubaczów announced the signing of Sichinava.

=== Ilves-Kissat ===
In early 2024, he moved to Finnish club Ilves-Kissat.

== Career statistics ==
As of match played 20 September 2026

Appearances and goals by club, season and competition
Club	Season	League			National cup (Note: Includes Georgian Cup, Ukrainian Cup, Kyrgyzstan Cup)		Europe		Other		Total	
Club	Season	Division	Apps	Goals	Apps	Goals	Apps	Goals	Apps	Goals	Apps	Goals
Volgar Astrakhan	2012–13	Russian First League	0	0	0	0	—		—		0	0
Kolkheti-1913 Poti	2012–13	Erovnuli Liga	4	1	0	0	0	0	—		4	1
WIT Georgia	2013–14	Erovnuli Liga	31	3	1	0	0	0	—		32	3
Kolkheti-1913 Poti	2014–15	Erovnuli Liga 2	24	3	4	1	—		—		28	4
Kolkheti-1913 Poti	2015–16	Erovnuli Liga 2	14	2	4	1	—		—		18	3
Kolkheti-1913 Poti	Total		38	5	8	2	0	0	—		46	7
Inhulets Petrove	2016–17	Ukrainian First League	25	5	0	0	—		—		25	5
Inhulets Petrove	2017-18	Ukrainian First League	33	1	2	0	—		—		35	1
Inhulets Petrove	2018–19	Ukrainian First League	17	3	6	1	—		—		23	4
Inhulets Petrove	2019–20	Ukrainian First League	27	17	2	0	—		—		29	17
Inhulets Petrove	2020–21	Ukrainian Premier League	22	6	0	0	0	0	—		22	6
Inhulets Petrove	Total		124	32	10	1	0	0	—		134	33
Inhulets Petrove-2	2016–17	Ukrainian Second League	3	2	0	0	—		—		3	2
Inhulets Petrove-2	2017–18	Ukrainian Second League	4	0	0	0	—		—		4	0
Inhulets Petrove-2	Total		7	2	0	0	0	0	—		7	2
Kolos Kovalivka	2021–22	Ukrainian Premier League	16	1	1	0	2 (Note: Appearances in UEFA Europa Conference League)	0	–		19	1
Kolos Kovalivka	2022–23	Ukrainian Premier League	0	0	0	0	0	0	—		0	0
KuPS (loan)	2022	Veikkausliiga	4	0	0	0	0	0	0	0	4	0
Alay	2023	Kyrgyz Premier League	10	0	1	0	0	0	—		11	0
Pogoń-Sokół Lubaczów	2023–24	IV liga Subcarpathia	3	0	—		—		—		3	0
Ilves-Kissat	2024	Kakkonen	20	7	—		—		—		20	7
Sporting Kristina	2024	Kolmonen	5	1	—		—		—		5	1
Słowianin Wolibórz	2024–25	IV liga Lower Silesia	4	0	—		—		—		4	0
Haka	2026	Ykkösliiga	8	0	1	0	0	0	–		9	0
Career total			272	52	22	3	2	0	0	0	295	55

== Honours ==
Inhulets Petrove

- Ukrainian First League: 2019–20
- Ukrainian Cup runner-up: 2018–19

Słowianin Wolibórz

- IV liga Lower Silesia: 2024–25

Individual

- Best Player of Ukrainian First League: 2019–20
