= Liudmyla Shmatko =

Ukrainian footballer (born 1993)

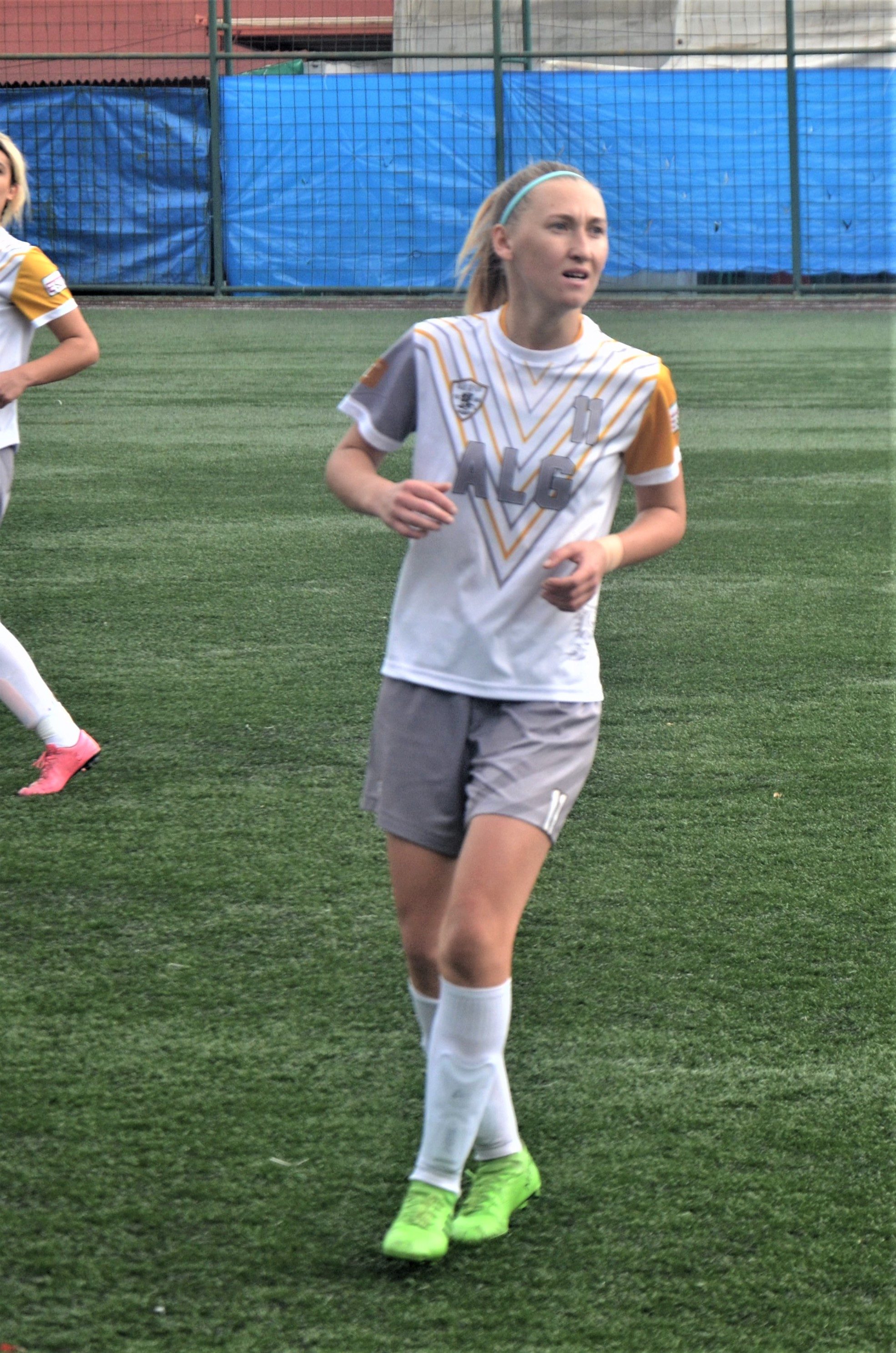
- Liudmyla Shmatko for ALG Spor (November 2018)

Personal information
- Full name: Liudmyla Dmitrievna Shmatko
- Date of birth: 25 October 1993 (age 33)
- Place of birth: Chernihiv, Ukraine
- Position: Defender

Team information
- Current team: Ankara BB Fomget
- Number: 25

Senior career*
Years	Team	Apps	(Gls)
2011–2012	Spartak ShVSM Chernihiv	?	(?)
2012–2018	Lehenda Chernihiv	47	(22)
2018–2019	ALG	17	(2)
2019–2020	Ankara BB Fomget	6	(0)
2021–2023	Ankara BB Fomget	34	(6)
2023–2024	Galatasaray	27	(2)
2024–	Ankara BB Fomget	20	(1)

Managerial career
- 2022–: Yunist ShVSM Chernihiv (academy)
- * Club domestic league appearances and goals as of 4 May 2025

Liudmyla Dmitrievna Shmatko (Ukrainian: Людмила Дмитрівна Шматко, born 25 October 1993) is a Ukrainian women's football defender who plays in the Turkish Super League for Ankara BB Fomget with jersey number 25.

== Playing career ==
=== Spartak Chernihiv & WFC Lehenda-ShVSM Chernihiv ===
Shmatko played in her country for Spartak ShVSM Chernihiv and WFC Lehenda-ShVSM Chernihiv in Chernihiv. With Lehenda, he played 47 matches, and she scored 22 goals and she got second places in the Ukrainian Women's League in 2013 and 2015. She also got second place in Ukrainian Women's Cup in 2013, 2014, 2015, 2016 and 2017–18.

=== ALG ===
In 2018, Shmatko moved to Turkey and joined the recently to the Turkish Women's First League promoted club ALG Spor in Gaziantep.

=== Fomget ===
In the second half of the 2019–20 Turkish Women's First Football League season, she transferred to the Ankara-based club Fomget Gençlik ve Spor. The next season, she did not appear. In the season 2021–22, Turkish Women's Football Super League was established, and her club played in the new top league. Her team finished the 2022–23 Turkish Super League season as champion. She played in two seasons 34 matches and scored 6 goals.

=== Galatasaray ===
For the 2031–4 Turkish Super League season, she transferred to Galatasaray in Istanbul. At the end of the season, her team became champion.

=== Ankara BB Fomget ===
Ln the 2024–25 Turkish Super League season, Shmatko returned to her former club Ankara BB Fomget. She won the champions title once again with her team.

== Coaching career ==
In 2022, she became the coach of Yunist ShVSM Chernihiv, the woman football club of the Yunist school in Chernihiv.

== Career statistics ==
As of match played on 4 May 2025.

Club	Season	League			Continental		National		Total	
Club	Season	Division	Apps	Goals	Apps	Goals	Apps	Goals	Apps	Goals
Spartak Chernihiv	2011	Ukrainian First League	0	0	0	0	0	0	0	0
Lehenda Chernihiv	2012	Ukrainian Women's League	0	0	0	0	0	0	0	0
Lehenda Chernihiv	2013	Ukrainian Women's League	0	0	0	0	0	0	0	0
Lehenda Chernihiv	2014	Ukrainian Women's League	0	0	0	0	0	0	0	0
Lehenda Chernihiv	2015	Ukrainian Women's League	0	0	0	0	0	0	0	0
Lehenda Chernihiv	2016	Ukrainian Women's League	0	0	0	0	0	0	0	0
Lehenda Chernihiv	2017	Ukrainian Women's League	0	0	0	0	0	0	0	0
Lehenda Chernihiv	2018	Ukrainian Women's League	0	0	0	0	0	0	0	0
2018–19	First League	17	2	–	–	0	0	17	2	
ABB Fomget	2019–20	First League	6	0	–	–	0	0	6	0
nkara BB Fomget	2021–22	Turkish Super League	9	2	–	–	0	0	9	2
nkara BB Fomget	2022–23	Turkish Super League	25	4	–	–	0	0	25	4
nkara BB Fomget	Total		34	6	–	–	0	0	34	6
Galatasaray	2023–24	Turkish Super League	27	2	–	–	0	0	27	2
Ankara BB Fomget	2024–25	Turkish Super League	20	1	–	–	0	0	20	1

== Honours ==
Ukrainian Women's League

Lehenda Chernihiv
Runners-up (2): 2013, 2015

Ukrainian Women's Cup

Lehenda Chernihiv
Runners-up (5): 2013, 2014, 2015, 2016, 2017–18

Turkish Super League

Ankara BB Fomget
Champions (2): 2022–23, 2024–25

Galatasaray
Champions (1): 2023–24

Turkish First League

ALG
Runners-up (1): 2018–19
