= FC Yunist Chernihiv =

Ukrainian football club

Yunist Chernihiv
- Full name: Yunist Chernihiv
- Nickname: Юність (Чернігів)
- Founded: 1999
- Ground: Yunist stadium, Chernihiv
- Capacity: 3000
- Manager: Serhiy Bukhonin
- Website: https://yunost.at.ua/
Home colours	Away colours

Yunist Chernihiv (Ukrainian: ФК «Юність» Чернігів) is a Ukrainian amateur football team based on Yunist Sports school in Chernihiv. The sports school is known for its talented players like Andriy Yarmolenko, Pavlo Polehenko, Serhiy Kovalenko, Vladyslav Shapoval, Pavlo Fedosov, Yuriy Maley, Nazar Voloshyn, Oleksiy Khoblenko, Dmytro MyronenkoAndriy Fedorenko, Maksym Tatarenko and Nika Sichinava.

The sports school fields its men team in Chernihiv Oblast Football Competitions and its women team Yunist ShVSM in amateur competition of the Ukrainian Women's Football First League.

== History ==
The team was founded in 2000 and in 2016-17 got second in the Chernihiv Oblast Football Championship. In 2004 the team beat Yunist Dinaz Vyshhorod for 1-0 at the Yunist Stadium and in 2006 Yunist Chernihiv won 4-2 always against Dinaz.

In 2018 the team won 2-1 against Premier Niva (Vinnytsia) and the team got second in the Chernihiv Oblast Football Championship. The Football school "Youth" from Chernihiv received 136 thousand for Yarmolenko.

In 2020, the renewed "Youth" will create a museum of football history with a separate exhibition about Andriy Yarmolenko, photo-1 According to him, the exposition about the famous football player will feature cups, medals, T-shirts, photos and other things from different periods of sports life - from studying at the Chernihiv sports school to the present time.

On 8 June 2021, the club for the first time in the history of Chernihiv football, the young men from the Yunost team won the Ukrainian Youth Football League of U-14 championship. The team, beat their peers - "Zirka" from Kropyvnytskyi with a score of 1: 2. The match took place in Ternopil. The best goalkeeper of the tournament was the player of "Youth" Rustam Baev, the best striker was another pupil of Chernihiv football Nikita Dorosh.

== Facilities and venue ==
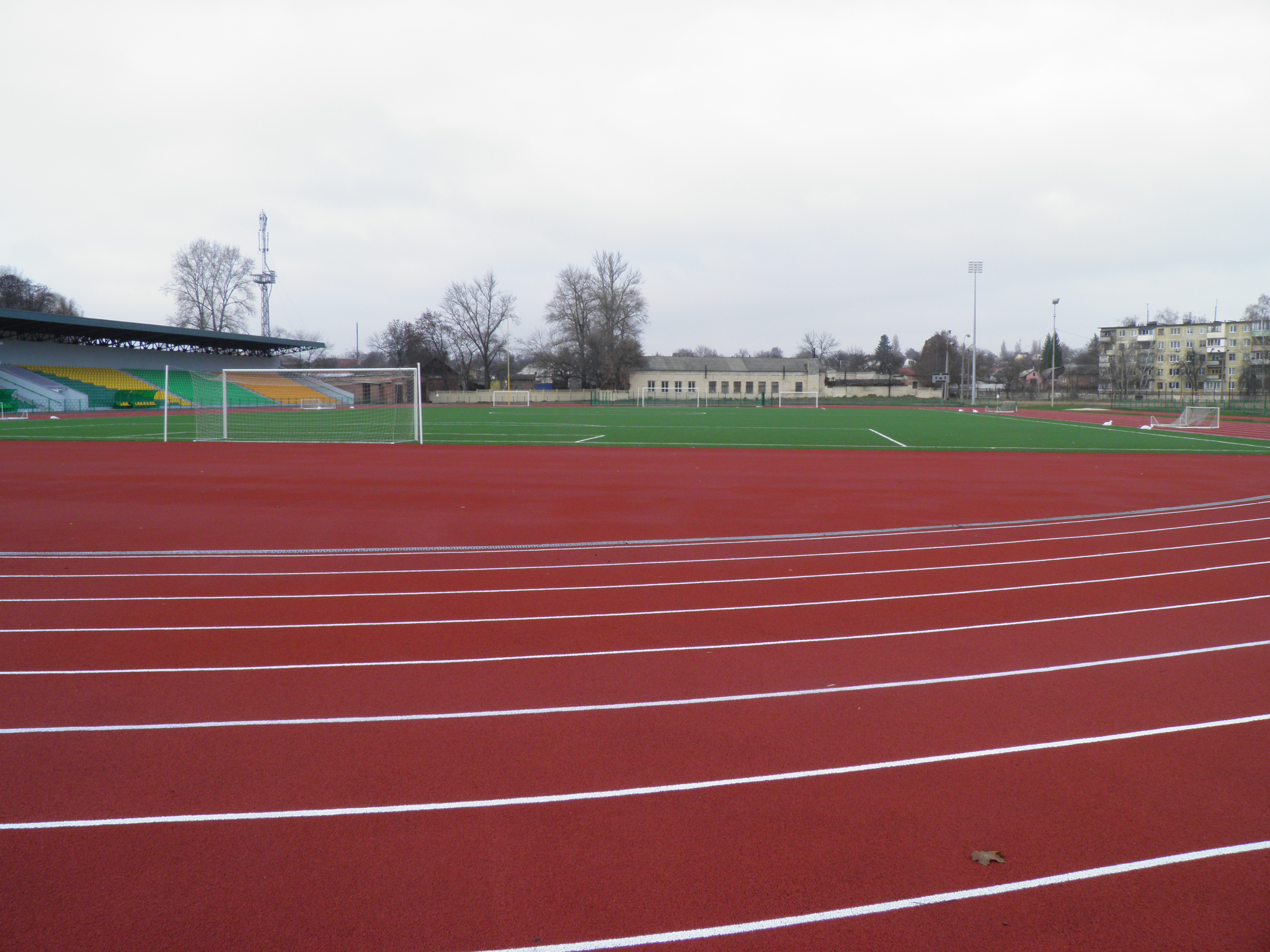
Yunist Stadium in Chernihiv

The team plays in the Yunist stadium that recently has been redeveloped with Tribunes for 3,000 seats. The renovation cost ₴55 million in 2019.

== Notable players ==
Players who have played in the club and who have distinguished themselves in some higher leagues and who have also become coaches

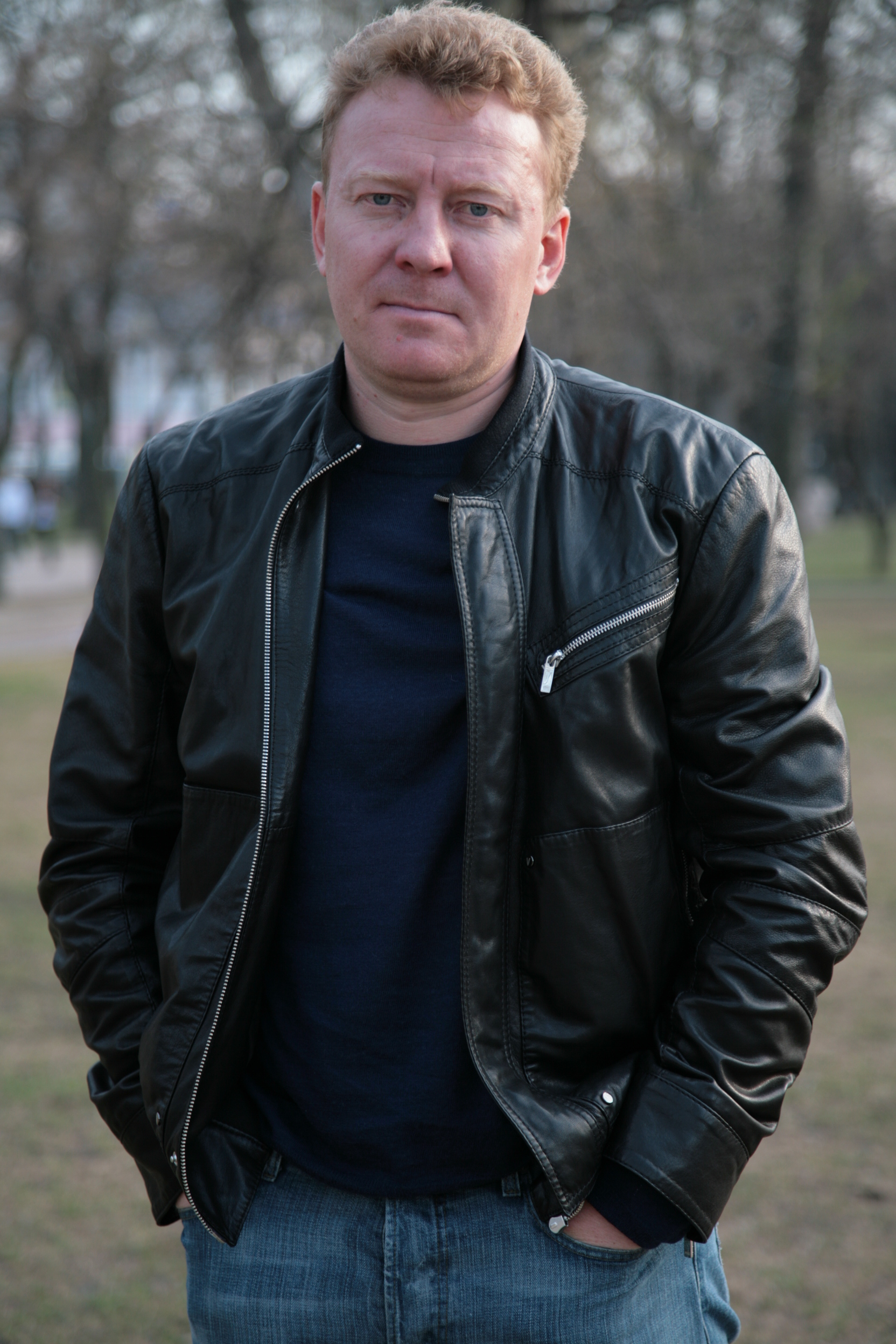
Oleh Kuznetsov graduate of Yunist

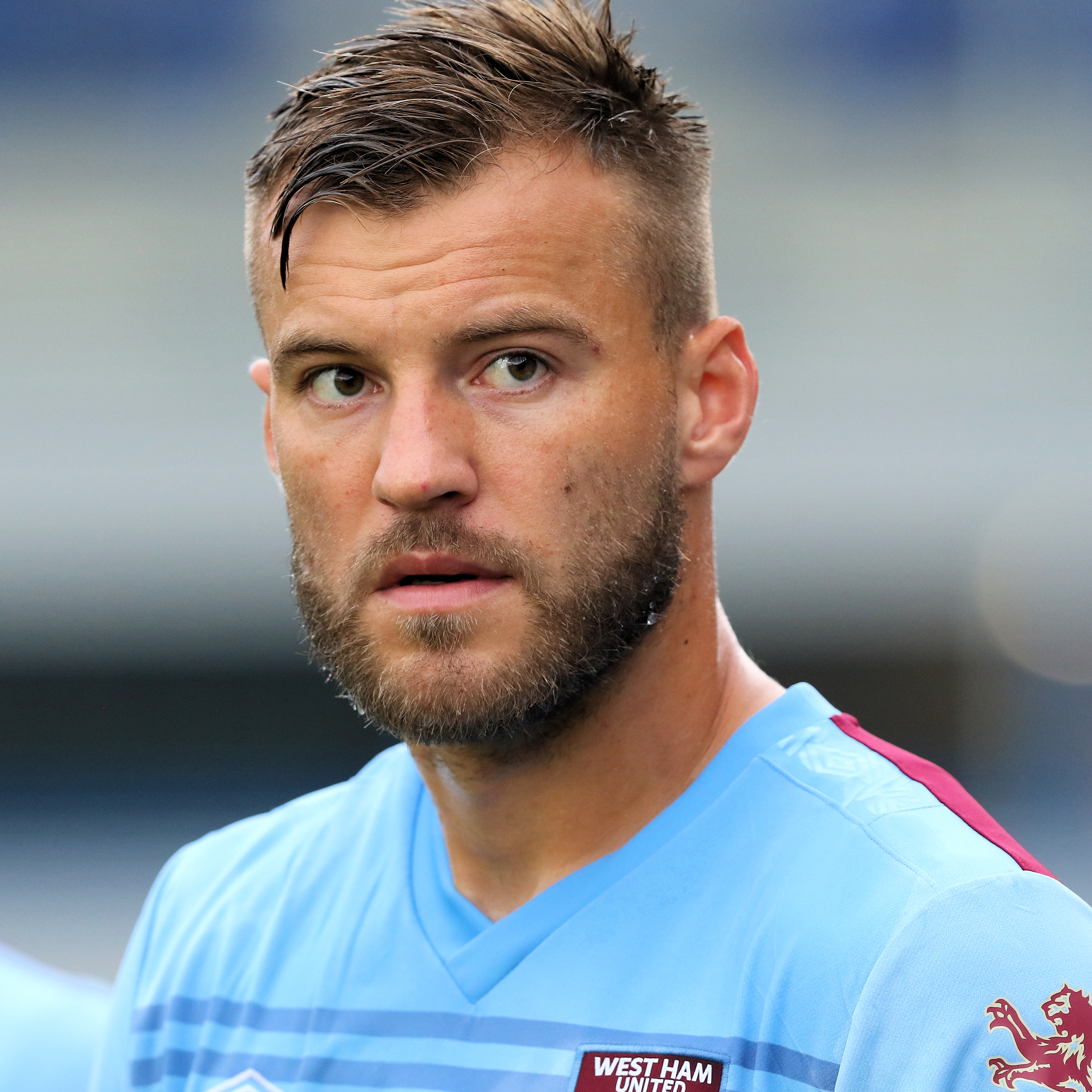
Andriy Yarmolenko is a graduate of Yunist

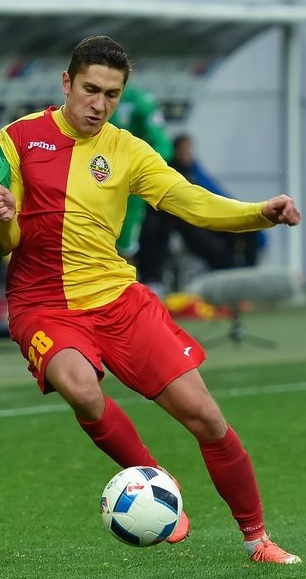
Pavlo Polehenko from Chernihiv, started his career with Yunist Chernihiv

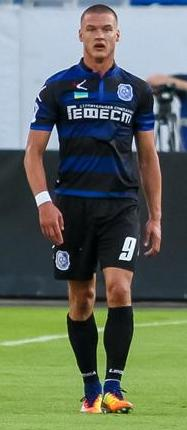
Oleksiy Khoblenko

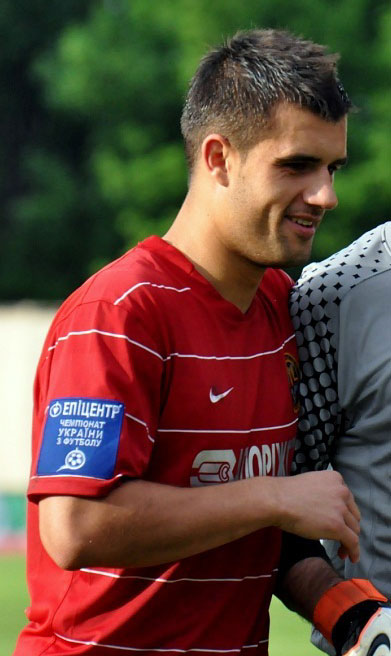
Denys Skepskyi born in Chernihiv, started with Yunist Chernihiv and after being transferred to Desna Chernihiv

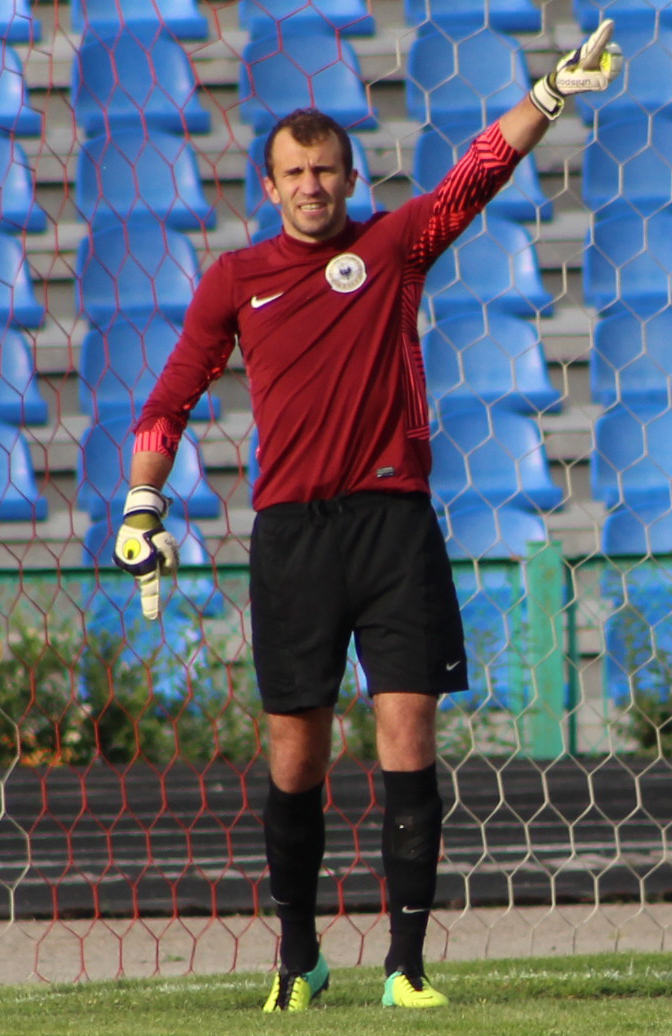
Andriy Fedorenko born in Chernihiv, started with Yunist Chernihiv

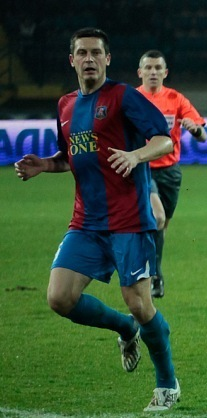
Oleksandr Hrytsay started with Yunist Chernihiv

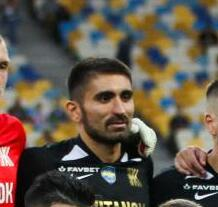
Nika Sichinava started with Yunist Chernihiv in 2009

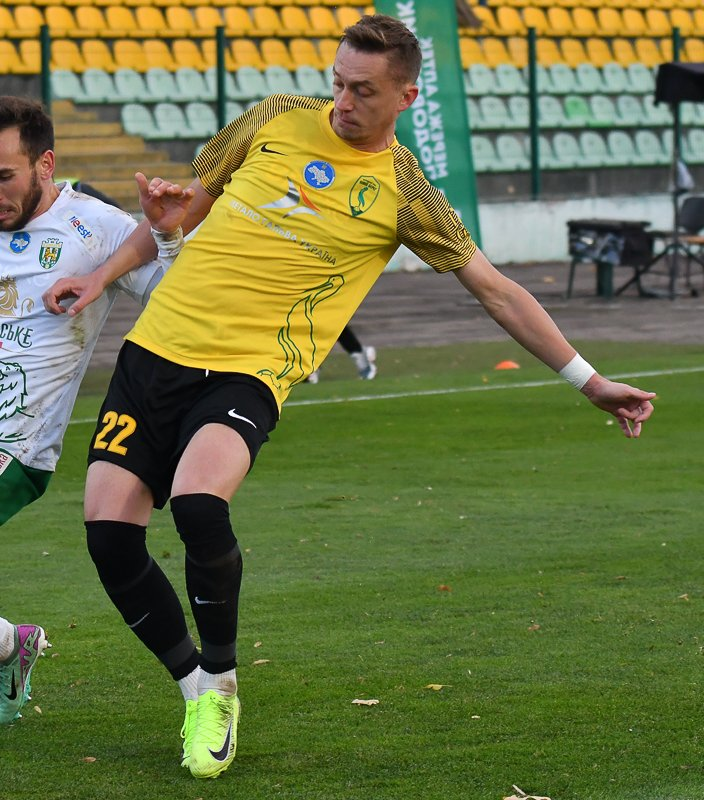
Vladyslav Shapoval started with Yunist Chernihiv in 2008

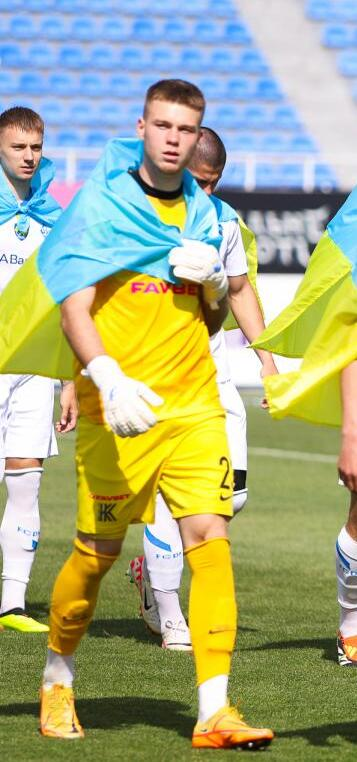
Kiril Fesyun started with Yunist Chernihiv in 2015

== Coaches ==
- (Ukraine) Mykola Lypoviy (2000–2003)
- (Ukraine) Vladimir Kulik (2003–2010)
- (Ukraine) Yuriy Melashenko (2010–2013)
- (Ukraine) Viktor Lazarenko (2013)
- (Ukraine) Serhiy Bukhonin (2013–Present)

== See also ==
- List of sport teams in Chernihiv
- FC Desna Chernihiv
- FC Desna-2 Chernihiv
- FC Desna-3 Chernihiv
- SDYuShOR Desna
- FC Chernihiv
- Lehenda Chernihiv
