= 2017 Ukrainian Women's League =

Ukrainian Women's League
- Season: 2017
- Champions: Zhytlobud-2 Kharkiv

The 2017 season of the Ukrainian Championship Higher League was the 26th season of Ukraine's women's football league. This was a transitional competition to bridge a gap before switching to a fall-spring calendar. Clubs played only a single round-robin in the top tier and the bottom tier. It ran from 21 April 2017 to 25 June 2017.

== Teams ==
Locations of teams in the 2017 Higher League

=== Team changes ===
Promoted from Persha Liha	Relegated to Persha Liha
Iednist Plysky Zlahoda-Dnipro-1	none

== Vyshcha Liha table ==
Pos	Team	Pld	W	D	L	GF	GA	GD	Pts
1	Zhytlobud-2 Kharkiv	8	8	0	0	42	4	+38	24
2	Zhytlobud-1 Kharkiv	8	6	1	1	42	5	+37	19
3	Lehenda-ShVSM Chernihiv	8	5	2	1	25	8	+17	17
4	Iatran Berestivets	8	3	3	2	9	11	−2	12
5	Pantery Uman	8	3	2	3	11	14	−3	11
6	Zlahoda-Dnipro-1	8	3	1	4	11	23	−12	10
7	Iednist Plysky	8	2	0	6	10	20	−10	6
8	Rodyna Kostopil	8	0	2	6	5	22	−17	2
9	Ateks SDIuShOR-16 Kyiv	8	0	1	7	5	53	−48	1

Source: [ ]
Rules for classification: 1) Points; 2) Head-to-head points; 3) Head-to-head goal difference; 4) Head-to-head goals scored; 5) Goal difference; 6) Goals scored.

=== Vyshcha Liha Results ===
Home \ Away	ATK	IAT	IED	LCH	PAN	ROD	ZH1	ZH2	ZD1
Ateks SDIuShOR-16 Kyiv		1–5		1–7		2–2	0–17		
Iatran Berestivets			2–1		0–0			0–5	2–1
Iednist Plysky	5–0			1–6		2–1	0–2		
Lehenda-ShVSM Chernihiv		0–0			3–0	3–0	1–1		
Pantery Uman	4–1		1–0					0–1	1–1
Rodyna Kostopil		0–0			1–4		0–2	0–6	
Zhytlobud-1 Kharkiv		3–0			7–1			1–3	9–0
Zhytlobud-2 Kharkiv	9–0		6–1	5–2					7–0
Zlahoda-Dnipro-1	4–0		2–0	0–3		3–1			

Source: WFPL.UA
Legend: Blue = home team win; Yellow = draw; Red = away team win.

=== Top scorers ===
Rank	Player	Club	Goals
1	(Ukraine) Anna Voronina	Zhytlobud-1 Kharkiv	10 (0)
2	(Ukraine) Yana Malakhova	Zhytlobud-2 Kharkiv	9 (0)
3	(Ukraine) Veronika Andrukhiv	Zhytlobud-2 Kharkiv	8 (0)
3	(Ukraine) Olha Ovdiychuk	Zhytlobud-1 Kharkiv	8 (0)
5	(Ukraine) Lyudmyla Shmatko	Lehenda-ShVSM Chernihiv	7 (0)
6	(Ukraine) Tayisiya Nesterenko	Zhytlobud-1 Kharkiv	6 (0)
6	(Ukraine) Mariya Vintonyak	Lehenda-ShVSM Chernihiv	6 (1)
8	(Ukraine) Yelyzaveta Kostyuchenko	Zhytlobud-1 Kharkiv	5 (2)

== Persha Liha ==
=== Group 1 ===
Pos	Team	Pld	W	D	L	GF	GA	GD	Pts	
1	Ladomyr Volodymyr	2	2	0	0	9	1	+8	6	Qualified to Persha Liha play-offs
2	Iantarochka Novoyavorivsk	2	1	0	1	8	2	+6	3	Qualified to Persha Liha play-offs
3	DIuSSh-3 Ivano-Frankivsk	2	0	0	2	0	14	−14	0	

Source: wfpl.com.ua
Rules for classification: 1) Points; 2) Head-to-head points; 3) Head-to-head goal difference; 4) Head-to-head goals scored; 5) Goal difference; 6) Goals scored.

=== Group 2 ===
Pos	Team	Pld	W	D	L	GF	GA	GD	Pts	
1	EMS-Podillya Vinnytsia	3	3	0	0	7	2	+5	9	Qualified to Persha Liha play-offs
2	Kolos-Mriya Makhnivka	3	2	0	1	8	4	+4	6	
3	Torpedochka Mykolaiv	3	1	0	2	0	4	−4	3	
4	Polissya Zhytomyr	3	0	0	3	0	5	−5	0	

Source: wfpl.com.ua
Rules for classification: 1) Points; 2) Head-to-head points; 3) Head-to-head goal difference; 4) Head-to-head goals scored; 5) Goal difference; 6) Goals scored.

=== Group 3 ===
Pos	Team	Pld	W	D	L	GF	GA	GD	Pts	
1	Mariupolchanka Mariupol	3	3	0	0	14	2	+12	9	Qualified to Persha Liha play-offs
2	Kharkivskyi koledzh	3	2	0	1	13	5	+8	6	
3	Luhanochka-Spartak	3	1	0	2	5	15	−10	3	
4	Voskhod Stara Mayachka	3	0	0	3	6	16	−10	0	

Source: wfpl.com.ua
Rules for classification: 1) Points; 2) Head-to-head points; 3) Head-to-head goal difference; 4) Head-to-head goals scored; 5) Goal difference; 6) Goals scored.

=== Play-offs ===
The playoff tournament took place in Vynnyky, Lviv.

==== Semifinals ====
Team 1	Score	Team 2
Iantarochka	2 – 4 (a.e.t.)	Ladomyr
EMS-Podillya	0 – 0 (4–5 p)	Mariupolchanka

==== Third place ====
Team 1	Score	Team 2
EMS-Podillya	1 – 2	Iantarochka

==== Final ====
Team 1	Score	Team 2
Mariupolchanka	1 – 2	Ladomyr

Ladomyr Volodymyr was crowned as the champions of the 2017 Persha Liha. They gained promotion to the Ukrainian Women's League.
