= 2022–23 Croatian Women's Football Cup =

Tournament details
- Country: Croatia
- Dates: 4 September 2022 – 4 June 2023
- Teams: 26

Final positions
- Champions: Split (5th title)
- Runner-up: Dinamo Zagreb

Tournament statistics
- Matches played: 23
- Goals scored: 143 (6.22 per match)
- Top goal scorer(s): Andreja Šćukanec-Hopinski (7)

The 2022–23 Croatian Women's Football Cup was the 32nd season of the annual Croatian football cup competition. Twenty six teams participated in the competition, all eight teams from the 2022–23 Croatian Women's First Football League and all teams from second level. The competition started on September 4,2022 and ended on June 4,2023 with the final in Zagreb.

== Matches ==
=== Preliminary round ===
4 September 2022	Mikanovci	4–2	Graničar Županja	Stari Mikanovci
12:00	Baković 13'; Gačić 36'; Mesić 82'; Ilić 89'	Report	Jelić 23'; Krištić 87'

4 September 2022	Hajduk Split	14–0	Župa dubrovačka	Split
12:00	Petković 2', 52'; Dugandžić 15', 16', 36'; Grebenar 22', 29'; Bulum 53'; Bagarić 56'; Vlastelica 57', 64', 82'; Vlajčević 76', 80'	Report

4 September 2022	Koprivnica	2–1	Međimurje-Čakovec	Koprivnica
16:00	Bojko 29'; Brkić 51'	Report	Višnjić 81'

4 September 2022	Slavonija Požega	1–0	Dilj	Požega
17:00	Samaržija 48'	Report

4 September 2022	Viktorija	3–5	Višnjevac	Slavonski Brod
17:30	Damjanović 17'; Jozić 25', 86'	Report	Lončar 44'; Žeželj 50'; Brzić 66'; Antunović 74', 80'

4 September 2022	Vrčevo	1–5	Neretva	Glavica
17:30	Novak Mezga 17'	Report	Sušić 11'; Prkačin 32'; Mandić 53'; Herceg 76'; Borovac 80'

4 September 2022	Sesvetski Kraljevec	2–4	Pregrada	Sesvetski Kraljevec
19:00	Tutić 6', 10'	Report	Šćukanec-Hopinski 1', 23', 44', 61'

4 September 2022	4 rijeke	0–3; Awarded	Gorica	Karlovac
		Report

4 September 2022	Istra 1961	3–0; Awarded	Varteks	Pula
		Report

22 September 2022	Frankopan	0–0 (3–1 p)	Graničar Đurđevac	Sisak
18:30		Report
	Penalties
	Plahutar (penalty scored); Bradarić (penalty scored); Denac (penalty missed); Vit (penalty scored)		(penalty missed) Vlašić; (penalty missed) Čižmešija; (penalty scored) Županić; (penalty missed) Orenda

=== Round of 16 ===
12 November 2022	Mikanovci	0–4	Hajduk Split	Stari Mikanovci
12:00		Report	Bulum 4', 12'; Sušak 29'; Deranja 63'

13 November 2022	Istra 1961	3–0	Višnjevac	Pula
10:00	Pavlović 6' (pen.), 27'; Babić 52'	Report

13 November 2022	Donat	7–0	Slavonija Požega	Zadar
13:00	Savčić 3', 10', 27', 44'; Gashi 17'; Klapan 23'; Đukić 80'	Report

13 November 2022	Rijeka	15–0	Frankopan	Rijeka
16:00	Cuculić 7'; Terawaki 9', 53', 77', 84'; Šulentić 11', 31', 76', 90'; Bozhinovska 18', 25', 29'; Veleska 63', 81'; Pokrivač 87'	Report

26 February 2023	Neretva	1–3	Pregrada	Metković
	Borovac 24'	Report	Šćukanec-Hopinski 16', 41', 90'

5 March 2023	Osijek	4–0	Agram	Osijek
12:00	Lubina 4' (pen.); Balić 7', 71'; Lojna 42'	Report

5 March 2023	Gorica	0–7	Split	Velika Gorica
13:00		Report	Luijks 8', 86'; Kurkutović 17', 75'; Đoković 40', 84'; Hadžić 43'

5 March 2023	Dinamo Zagreb	10–0	Koprivnica	Zagreb
15:00	Stanić 5', 18', 56', 70'; Spajić 13', 53'; Mikulica 60', 81'; Guguloth 76'; Zdunić 88'	Report

=== Quarter-finals ===
5 March 2023	Pregrada	1–10	Hajduk Split	Pregrada
11:00	Marec 68' (pen.)	Report	Petković 21', 25'; Kukavica 38'; Bakalar 49' (pen.); Bočkaj 51' (o.g.); Čanjevac 55', 89'; Vlastelica 60'; Grebenar 66'; Mišura 79'

5 March 2023	Istra 1961	1–1 (3–4 p)	Donat	Pula
11:00	Pavlović 64'	Report	Andrić 84'
	Penalties
	Lovrić (penalty scored); Ban (penalty scored); Tomić (penalty scored); Petričević (penalty missed); Vidović (penalty missed)		(penalty scored) Vunić; (penalty missed) Klapan; (penalty scored) Kirilenko; (penalty scored) Laća; (penalty scored) Čavić

22 March 2023	Dinamo Zagreb	6–0	Rijeka	Zagreb
17:30	Jyoti 9', 20'; Spajić 50'; Stanić 43', 48'; Stančić 84'	Report

26 April 2023	Split	2–2 (5–4 p)	Osijek	Split
16:00	Pedersen 56'; Luijks 66'	Report	Šalek 28'; Medić 90'
	Penalties
	Hadžić (penalty scored); Đoković (penalty scored); Bukovec (penalty scored); Bošnjak (penalty scored); Zajmi (penalty scored)		(penalty scored) Lubina; (penalty scored) Živković; (penalty missed) Damjanović; (penalty scored) Bulut; (penalty scored) Vujadin

=== Semi-finals ===
25 May 2023	Split	14–0	Donat	Split
17:00	Ivanuša 11', 21', 35', 63', 85'; Bošnjak 38', 65'; Đoković 43', 53', 90'; Kurkutović 44', 55', 76'; Kapetanović 66'	Report

28 May 2023	Dinamo Zagreb	2–1	Hajduk Split	Zagreb
17:00	Jedvaj 2'; Jyoti 24'	Report	Petković 34'

=== Final ===
4 June 2023
15:00

Dinamo Zagreb	2–3	Split
Petarić 10'; Jyoti 47'	Report	Pedersen 37'; Hadžić 74', 87'

Stadion NŠC Stjepan Spajić, Zagreb
