= Fatjesa Gegollaj =

Croatian kosovan footballer

Personal information
- Full name: Fatjesa Halil Gegollaj
- Date of birth: 5 November 2001 (age 25)
- Place of birth: Prizren, Kosovo under UN administration
- Position: Left midfielder

Team information
- Current team: Al-Ula

Youth career
- 2013–2016: Marjan
- 2016–2017: Rijeka

Senior career*
Years	Team	Apps	(Gls)
2017–2018	Rijeka	17	(2)
2018–2022	Split	36	(8)
2022–2023	Sion	3	(0)
2023–	Al-Ula	0	(0)

International career^{‡}
2015	Croatia U15	1	(0)
2016	Croatia U16	3	(0)
2016–2017	Croatia U17	9	(0)
2018–2020	Croatia U19	12	(0)
2019–	Croatia	2	(0)
- * Club domestic league appearances and goals as of 15 November 2020 ‡ National team caps and goals as of 22 September 2020

Fatjesa Halil Gegollaj (Croatian: Fatjesa Halil Gegolaj; born 5 November 2001) is a Kosovan-born Croatian professional footballer who plays as a left midfielder for Saudi club Al-Ula and the Croatia national team.

== Club career ==
=== Early career and Rijeka ===
Gegollaj played football with boys in Zmaj Makarska until the moment when in the age of 12 became part of Marjan's youth team, where after three years it was transferred to Rijeka's youth team. After one year, she was promoted to the Rijeka's senior team due to good performances with youth team. On 1 November 2017, Gegollaj made her debut as professional footballer in a 1–1 away draw against Neretva after being named in the starting line-up. Eighteen days later, she scored her first goal for Rijeka in her seventh appearance for the club in a 20–0 home deep win over Viktorija in Croatian Women's First Football League.

=== Split ===
Gegollaj before the start of the 2018–19 season joined with Croatian Women's First Football League club Split. On 23 September 2018, she made her debut in a 0–5 away win against her former club Rijeka after being named in the starting line-up. Twenty days later, Gegollaj scored her first goals for Split in her second appearance for the club in a 0–8 away win over her former club Marjan in Croatian Women's First Football League.

=== Overseas career ===
In 2022, Gegollaj signed for Swiss club FC Sion, before joining Saudi club Al-Ula in September 2023.

== International career ==
From 2015, until 2020, Gegollaj has been part of Croatia at youth international level, respectively has been part of the U15, U16, U17 and U19 teams and she with these teams played 25 matches. On 1 April 2019, Gegollaj was named as part of the Croatia squad for 2019 Wuhan International Tournament. Six days later, she made her debut with Croatia in 2019 Wuhan International Tournament third-place playoff match against Russia after coming on as a substitute at 82nd minute in place of Ana Dujmović.

Gegollaj was part of the squad called up for the 2023 Cyprus Women's Cup.

== Personal life ==
Gegollaj was born in Prizren, FR Yugoslavia (modern-day Kosovo) to Kosovar Albanian parents who lived and worked in Makarska, Croatia.

== Career statistics ==
=== Club ===
As of 15 November 2020

Club	Season	League			Cup (Note: Cup appearances are partially missing)		Continental		Total		Ref
Club	Season	Division	Apps	Goals	Apps	Goals	Apps	Goals	Apps	Goals	Ref
Rijeka	2017–18	Croatian Women's First Football League	17	2	—				17	2	
Split	2018–19	Croatian Women's First Football League	14	3	1	0	—		15	3	
Split	2019–20	Croatian Women's First Football League	14	4	1	1	0	0	15	5	
Split	2020–21	Croatian Women's First Football League	8	1	1	0	1	0	10	1	
Split	Total		53	10	3	1	1	0	57	11	
Career total			53	10	3	1	1	0	57	11	

=== International ===
As of 22 September 2020

National team	Year	Apps	Goals
Croatia
Croatia	2019	1	0
Croatia	2020	1	0
Total		2	0

==== International goals ====
No.	Date	Venue	Opponent	Score	Result	Competition
1.	10 April 2023	Georgios Kamaras Stadium, Athens, Greece	Greece	1–0	1–2	Friendly
