= 2023 Cyprus Women's Cup squads =

List of players competing at the 14th edition of the Cyprus Women's Cup

This article lists the squads for the 2023 Cyprus Women's Cup, the 14th edition of the Cyprus Women's Cup. The cup consisted of a series of friendly games, and was held in Cyprus from 16 to 22 February 2023. The four national teams involved in the tournament registered a squad of 23 players.

The age listed for each player is on 16 February 2023, the first day of the tournament. The numbers of caps and goals listed for each player do not include any matches played after the start of tournament. The club listed is the club for which the player last played a competitive match prior to the tournament. The nationality for each club reflects the national association (not the league) to which the club is affiliated. A flag is included for coaches that are of a different nationality than their own national team.

== Squads ==
=== Croatia ===
Coach: Nenad Gračan

The squad was announced on 6 February 2023.

No.	Pos.	Player	Date of birth (age)	Club
1	GK	Doris Bačić	23 February 1995 (aged 27)	(Spain) Levante Las Planas
2	MF	Ružica Krajinović	8 January 2002 (aged 21)	(Austria) Wacker Innsbruck
3	DF	Ana Jelenčić	8 June 1994 (aged 28)	(Italy) Parma
4	DF	Leonarda Balog	5 February 1993 (aged 30)	(Austria) St. Pölten
5	DF	Kristina Nevrkla	5 July 1990 (aged 32)	(Croatia) Osijek
6	MF	Tea Krznarić	9 August 2004 (aged 18)	(Austria) LASK
7	MF	Petra Pezelj	28 October 1998 (aged 24)	(Croatia) Split
8	FW	Ella Ljuština	10 May 2002 (aged 20)	(Switzerland) Grasshopper
9	FW	Ivana Rudelić	25 January 1992 (aged 31)	(Germany) Bayern Munich
10	MF	Anela Lubina	18 December 1995 (aged 27)	(Croatia) Osijek
11	FW	Ana Maria Marković	9 November 1999 (aged 23)	(Switzerland) Grasshopper
12	GK	Ana Filipović	4 July 2003 (aged 19)	(Croatia) Dinamo Zagreb
13	MF	Helena Spajić	8 February 2000 (aged 23)	(Croatia) Dinamo Zagreb
14	DF	Antonia Dulčić	4 February 1997 (aged 26)	(Italy) Napoli
15	DF	Maria Kunštek	6 November 1998 (aged 24)	(Croatia) Osijek
16	MF	Ivana Kirilenko	21 June 2000 (aged 22)	(Croatia) Donat
17	FW	Karla Jedvaj	16 November 2000 (aged 22)	(Croatia) Dinamo Zagreb
18	FW	Tamara Šarić	12 February 1998 (aged 25)	Austria Lustenau
19	DF	Janja Čanjevac	14 November 2000 (aged 22)	(Croatia) Hajduk
20	MF	Veronika Terzić	16 February 2000 (aged 23)	(Bosnia and Herzegovina) Emina
21	MF	Fatjesa Gegollaj	5 November 2001 (aged 21)	(Switzerland) Sion
22	MF	Izabela Lojna	11 May 1992 (aged 30)	(Croatia) Osijek
23	GK	Laura Fiket	5 June 2002 (aged 20)	(Croatia) Split
	FW	Jelena Dordić	27 July 2001 (aged 21)	(Austria) First Vienna

=== Finland ===
Coach: Marko Saloranta

The squad was announced on 3 February 2023.

No.	Pos.	Player	Date of birth (age)	Club
1	GK	Milla-Maj Majasaari	15 October 1999 (aged 23)	(Sweden) Uppsala
2	DF	Elli Pikkujämsä	24 October 1999 (aged 23)	(United States) Racing Louisville
3	DF	Eva Nyström	29 November 1999 (aged 23)	(Sweden) Hammarby
4	MF	Ria Öling	15 September 1994 (aged 28)	(Sweden) Rosengård
5	DF	Emma Koivisto	25 September 1994 (aged 28)	(England) Liverpool
6	DF	Tiia Peltonen	8 June 1995 (aged 27)	(Denmark) Fortuna Hjørring
7	FW	Adelina Engman	11 October 1994 (aged 28)	(Sweden) Hammarby
8	MF	Olga Ahtinen	15 August 1997 (aged 25)	(Sweden) Linköping
9	MF	Vilma Koivisto	21 November 2002 (aged 20)	(Sweden) Norrköping
10	MF	Emmi Alanen	30 April 1991 (aged 31)	(Sweden) Kristianstad
11	MF	Nora Heroum	20 July 1994 (aged 28)	(Italy) Parma
12	GK	Anna Tamminen	30 October 1994 (aged 28)	(Sweden) Hammarby
13	MF	Jenny Danielsson	30 August 1994 (aged 28)	(Scotland) Rangers
14	FW	Heidi Kollanen	6 June 1997 (aged 25)	(Sweden) Örebro
15	DF	Nanne Ruuskanen	19 November 2001 (aged 21)	(Norway) Brann
16	FW	Kaisa Collin	16 April 1997 (aged 25)	(Sweden) Eskilstuna United
17	FW	Sanni Franssi	19 March 1995 (aged 27)	(Spain) Real Sociedad
18	FW	Linda Sällström	13 July 1988 (aged 34)	(Sweden) Vittsjö
19	MF	Emma Peuhkurinen	30 November 1999 (aged 23)	(Sweden) Örebro
20	MF	Eveliina Summanen	29 May 1998 (aged 24)	(England) Tottenham Hotspur
21	DF	Emmi Siren	23 February 2001 (aged 21)	(Finland) KuPS
22	FW	Jutta Rantala	11 November 1999 (aged 23)	(Sweden) Vittsjö
23	GK	Tinja-Riikka Korpela	5 May 1986 (aged 36)	(England) Tottenham Hotspur
24	DF	Joanna Tynnilä	1 September 2001 (aged 21)	(Finland) HJK
25	MF	Katariina Kosola	24 February 2001 (aged 21)	(Sweden) Örebro

=== Hungary ===
Coach: (Germany) Margret Kratz

The squad was announced on 7 February 2023. The following week, Barbara Bíró and Emese Szakonyi withdrew from the squad and were replaced by Evelin Erős and Eszter Csigi.

No.	Pos.	Player	Date of birth (age)	Club
1	GK	Ágnes Pongrácz	21 August 2005 (aged 17)	(Hungary) Puskás Akadémia
2	DF	Beatrix Fördős	7 January 2002 (aged 21)	(Italy) Inter Milan
3	DF	Laura Palakovics	16 April 2002 (aged 20)	(Hungary) Puskás Akadémia
4	FW	Sára Pusztai	16 November 2001 (aged 21)	(Hungary) Ferencváros
5	DF	Diána Németh	31 August 2004 (aged 18)	(Hungary) Ferencváros
6	MF	Evelin Fenyvesi	7 November 1996 (aged 26)	(Hungary) Ferencváros
7	FW	Zsanett Kaján	16 September 1997 (aged 25)	(Italy) Fiorentina
8	MF	Viktória Szabó	26 May 1997 (aged 25)	(Hungary) Ferencváros
9	MF	Eszter Csigi	7 September 1999 (aged 23)	(Hungary) Ferencváros
10	FW	Fanny Vágó	23 July 1991 (aged 31)	(Hungary) Ferencváros
11	DF	Virág Nagy	4 July 2001 (aged 21)	(Italy) Sassuolo
12	GK	Evelin Erős	8 April 1999 (aged 23)	(Hungary) MTK Hungária
13	FW	Emőke Pápai	24 June 2003 (aged 19)	(Switzerland) Grasshopper
14	MF	Loretta Németh	9 December 1995 (aged 27)	(Hungary) Győr
15	MF	Fanni Vachter	14 May 2001 (aged 21)	(Hungary) MTK Hungária
16	MF	Diána Csányi	20 March 1998 (aged 24)	(Hungary) Ferencváros
17	MF	Petra Kocsán	4 June 1998 (aged 24)	(Hungary) Győr
18	DF	Laura Kovács	15 June 2000 (aged 22)	(Hungary) Győr
19	DF	Fanni Nagy	3 January 2003 (aged 20)	(Hungary) Győr
20	DF	Lilla Turányi	20 December 1998 (aged 24)	(Germany) Bayer Leverkusen
21	DF	Hanna Németh	17 September 1998 (aged 24)	(Germany) Werder Bremen
22	GK	Luca Barti	17 September 1999 (aged 23)	(Hungary) Ferencváros
23	MF	Luca Papp	24 April 2002 (aged 20)	(Hungary) Ferencváros

=== Romania ===
Coach: Cristian Dulca

The squad was announced on 6 February 2023.

No.	Pos.	Player	Date of birth (age)	Club
1	GK	Szidonia Salamon	3 April 2000 (aged 22)	(Romania) Csíkszereda Miercurea Ciuc
2	DF	Olivia Oprea	19 March 1987 (aged 35)	(Spain) Alhama
3	DF	Alexandra Tunoaia	12 April 2001 (aged 21)	(Italy) Chievo Verona
4	MF	Ioana Bortan	23 January 1989 (aged 34)	(Romania) Olimpia Cluj
5	DF	Teodora Meluță	3 August 1999 (aged 23)	(Romania) Politehnica Timișoara
6	DF	Maria Ficzay	8 November 1991 (aged 31)	(Denmark) Fortuna Hjørring
7	MF	Ana Vlădulescu	4 March 2001 (aged 21)	(Hungary) Haladás-Viktoria
8	MF	Ștefania Vătafu	12 July 1993 (aged 29)	(Belgium) Anderlecht
9	FW	Laura Rus	1 October 1987 (aged 35)	(Italy) Apulia Trani
10	MF	Mihaela Ciolacu	12 August 1998 (aged 24)	(Romania) Olimpia Cluj
11	DF	Anita Kis	25 February 2002 (aged 20)	(Hungary) Haladás-Viktoria
12	GK	Camelia Ceasar	13 December 1997 (aged 25)	(Italy) Roma
13	DF	Erika Geréd	28 April 1999 (aged 23)	(Hungary) Diósgyőr
14	MF	Andrea Herczeg	13 September 1994 (aged 28)	(Hungary) Győr
15	DF	Brigitta Gődér	6 May 1992 (aged 30)	(Hungary) Haladás-Viktoria
16	MF	Ioana Bălăceanu	11 July 2003 (aged 19)	(Romania) Olimpia Cluj
17	DF	Claudia Bistrian	31 August 1996 (aged 26)	(Italy) Apulia Trani
18	FW	Mara Bâtea	12 April 1995 (aged 27)	(Romania) Olimpia Cluj
19	MF	Beata Ambruș	30 June 1998 (aged 24)	(Ukraine) Kolos Kovalivka
20	FW	Cristina Carp	28 July 1997 (aged 25)	(Switzerland) Young Boys
21	FW	Bianca Ienovan	23 August 2002 (aged 20)	(Romania) Politehnica Timișoara
22	FW	Carmen Marcu	30 August 2001 (aged 21)	(Romania) Olimpia Cluj
23	GK	Lavinia Boandă	8 March 1994 (aged 28)	(Italy) Lumezzane
24	MF	Mădălina Tătar	19 December 2002 (aged 20)	(Portugal) Racing Power

== Player representation ==
=== By club ===
Clubs with 3 or more players represented are listed.

Players	Club
9	(Hungary) Ferencváros
5	(Hungary) Győr, (Romania) Olimpia Cluj
4	(Croatia) Osijek
3	(Croatia) Dinamo Zagreb, (Hungary) Haladás-Viktoria, (Sweden) Hammarby, (Sweden) Örebro, (Switzerland) Grasshopper

=== By club nationality ===
Players	Clubs
22	Hungary
14	Sweden
11	Croatia, Italy
8	Romania
5	Austria, Switzerland
3	England, Germany, Spain
2	Denmark, Finland
1	Belgium, Bosnia and Herzegovina, Norway, Portugal, Scotland, Ukraine, United States

=== By club federation ===
Players	Federation
95	UEFA
1	CONCACAF

=== By representatives of domestic league ===
National squad	Players
Hungary	17
Croatia	11
Romania	8
Finland	2
