= 2021–22 Croatian Women's Football Cup =

Tournament details
- Country: Croatia
- Dates: 19 September 2021 – 5 June 2022
- Teams: 26

Final positions
- Champions: Split (4th title)
- Runner-up: Osijek

Tournament statistics
- Matches played: 23
- Goals scored: 145 (6.3 per match)
- Top goal scorer(s): Lorena Balić (10)

The 2021–22 Croatian Women's Football Cup was the 31st season of the annual Croatian football cup competition. Twenty six teams participated in the competition, all eight teams from the 2021–22 Croatian Women's First Football League and all teams from second level. The competition started on 19 September 2021 and ended on 5 June 2022 with the final in Županja, a nominally neutral venue.

== Matches ==
=== Preliminary round ===
19 September 2021	Slavonija Požega	0–7	Viktorija	Požega
10:00		Report	Petrović 26', 41'; Martinko 45'; Glavač 62'; Skalić 79'; Lubina 82', 90'	Referee: Nenad Vargović

19 September 2021	Mikanovci	2–4	Višnjevac	Stari Mikanovci
12:00	Ilić 4', 34' (pen.)	Report	Ahmeti 36'; Poč 55', 65'; Tovarović 77'	Referee: Darko Dumančić

19 September 2021	4 rijeke	2–3	Varteks	Karlovac
14:00	Goršić 76', 78'	Report	Sambolec 5', 49'; Lušić 72'	Referee: Zvonimir Radinić

19 September 2021	Vrčevo	0–2	Rijeka	Glavica
15:00		Report	Jović 29'; Jahić 58'	Referee: Ante Žilić

19 September 2021	Graničar Đurđevac	0–8	Pregrada	Đurđevac
15:00		Report	Lončar 26'; Tomić 40'; Stanković 51', 65', 75'; Jalšavečki 61', 73'; Šćukanec-Hopinski 87'	Referee: Mario Brunec

19 September 2021	Župa dubrovačka	0–7	Hajduk Split	Čibača
15:30		Report	Prskalo 17'; Bakalar 25'; Lovrinčević 29'; Deranja 40'; Šunjić 59'; Baraban 65'; Dugandžić 80'	Referee: Lukša Klaić

19 September 2021	Frankopan	0–6	Gorica	Sisak
16:00		Report	Godinić 29', 42', 69'; Malekinušić 38'; Straka 45'; Cicijelj 56'	Referee: Marko Cestarić

19 September 2021	Lepoglava	0–3; Awarded	Koprivnica	Lepoglava
16:00		Report

19 September 2021	Odra	0–3; Awarded	Međimurje-Čakovec	Zagreb
		Report

23 September 2021	Dilj	2–2 (3–4 p)	Graničar Županja	Vinkovci
20:00	Cvitković 3'; Knežević 34' (pen.)	Report	Đaković 72', 75'	Referee: Dino Zrno

=== Round of 16 ===
17 October 2021	Pregrada	0–5	Dinamo Zagreb	Pregrada
11:00		Report	Petarić 10', 89'; Kurkutović 14'; Stanić 56', 73'	Referee: Marija Cikojević

17 October 2021	Neretva	0–6	Donat	Metković
15:00		Report	Balić 10'; Dubravica 21'; Barbir 23'; Savčić 45', 59', 61'	Referee: Mišo Krešić

17 October 2021	Višnjevac	0–13	Osijek	Višnjevac
15:30		Report	Balić 7', 23', 27', 30', 73', 77', 79'; Bulut 9', 28'; Kovačević 11'; Joščak 32'; Lubina 39' (pen.); Andrlić 82'	Referee: Mario Vukušić

17 October 2021	Koprivnica	1–6	Agram	Starigrad
15:30	Videc 89'	Report	Resanović 1'; Bučić 35' (pen.); Žigić 37'; Slavica 46', 60'; Pazarac 65'	Referee: Marijo Petrović

28 November 2021	Varteks	0–4	Međimurje-Čakovec	Hrašćica
13:30		Report	Fot 6'; Vizinger 20', 77'; Blagus 30'	Referee: Filip Hirš

4 December 2021	Gorica	1–3	Rijeka	Buševec
14:00	Godinić 59' (pen.)	Report	Šulentić 9', 42'; Jović 73'	Referee: Jelena Kumer

12 December 2021	Hajduk Split	1–7	Split	Split
13:00	Baraban 40'	Report	Khimich 8'; Pezelj 13', 30'; Domazet 32'; Dulčić 73'; Bošnjak 78'; Bukač 86' (pen.)	Referee: Jelena Pejković

20 February 2022	Graničar Županja	1–3	Viktorija	Županja
14:00	Jelić 24' (pen.)	Report	Petrović 13' (pen.); Martinović 37', 88'	Referee: Oliver Romić

=== Quarter-finals ===
20 February 2022	Međimurje-Čakovec	2–6	Rijeka	Čakovec
14:00	Bister 57'; Višnjić 75'	Report	Vlastelica 6', 64' (pen.); Zivikj 7'; Mikulica 27'; Šulentić 77'; Marov 89'	Referee: Tomislav Hlevnjak

6 March 2022	Osijek	17–0	Viktorija	Osijek
13:00	Šalek 11'; A. Lubina 19'; Joščak 22', 25'; Andrlić 30'; Balić 30', 45', 47'; L. Lubina 37' (o.g.); Živković 41'; Kovačević 48'; Blažević 60', 64', 71'; Culek 65', 78'; Medić 76'	Report		Referee: Nikola Vuković

31 March 2022	Split	8–1	Donat	Split
19:00	Hadžić 13', 24'; O'Neill 19'; Bošnjak 34', 37'; Grebenar 49'; Hazan 61'; Krznarić 80'	Report	Đukić 72'	Referee: Jelena Pejković

26 April 2022	Dinamo Zagreb	3–1	Agram	Zagreb
18:30	Stanić 29'; Petarić 59'; Jedvaj 86'	Report	Jakobašić 89'	Referee: Sabina Bolić

=== Semi-finals ===
11 May 2022	Dinamo Zagreb	0–1	Osijek	Zagreb
16:00		Report	Lojna 48'	Referee: Antonio Melnjak

11 May 2022	Rijeka	2–7	Split	Rijeka
18:00	Mikulica 30'; Štokan 90+1' (pen.)	Report	Đoković 2', 23'; Kapetanović 17', 39'; Grebenar 60'; Šabašov 70'; Krznarić 84'	Referee: Luka Milković

=== Final ===
5 June 2022
17:30

Osijek	0–1	Split
	Report	Domazet 16'

Spomen stadion prvog igranja nogometa u Hrvatskoj, Županja
Referee: Sabina Bolić
