= 2020–21 Croatian Women's Football Cup =

Tournament details
- Country: Croatia
- Dates: 13 September 2020 – 3 June 2021
- Teams: 23

Final positions
- Champions: Split (3rd title)
- Runner-up: Osijek

Tournament statistics
- Matches played: 21
- Goals scored: 109 (5.19 per match)
- Top goal scorer(s): Izabela Lojna (12)

The 2020–21 Croatian Women's Football Cup was the 30th season of the annual Croatian football cup competition. Twenty three teams participated in the competition, all eight teams from the 2020–21 Croatian Women's First Football League and all teams from second level. The competition started on 13 September 2020 and ended on 3 June 2021 with the final in Krapina, a nominally neutral venue.

== Matches ==
=== Preliminary round ===
| 13 September 2020 | Mikanovci | 0–7 | Višnjevac | Stari Mikanovci |
| 10:00 | | Report | Lončar 11', 15', 19', 87'; Šošić 17'; Kockarević 59'; Tovarović 62' | Referee: Ivan Menđušić (Vinkovci) |

| 13 September 2020 | Graničar Đurđevac | 1–4 | Varteks | Đurđevac |
| 11:30 | Kokša 21' | Report | Kocijan 31', 88', 89'; Rabuzin 41' | Stadium: ŠRC Vlado Leščan Duspe; Referee: Dino Sabljić |

| 13 September 2020 | Frankopan | 4–1 | Odra | Sisak |
| 16:00 | Kljajić 45', 60'; Kasap 47'; Karanović 52' | Report | Dizdar 64' | Stadium: Galdovo; Referee: Vlatko Mlinarić |

| 13 September 2020 | 4 rijeke | 0–3 | Pregrada | Karlovac |
| 17:00 | | Report | Šćukanec-Hopinski 24', 37' (pen.); Jalšavečki 86' | Stadium: Stadion Branko Čavlović-Čavlek; Referee: Maja Brozović |

| 13 September 2020 | Dilj | 2–4 | Graničar Županja | Vinkovci |
| 17:00 | Rajković 5'; Štiler 7' | Report | Mamić 31', 62'; Jelić 55'; Kovačić 82' | Referee: Tomislav Haban (Jarmina) |

| 13 September 2020 | Lepoglava | 0–3; Awarded | Međimurje | Lepoglava |
| 17:00 |

| 13 September 2020 | Koprivnica | 2–3 | Katarina Zrinski | Đelekovec |
| 18:00 | Brkić 14'; Videc 30' | Report | Ćurić 10', 42'; Cicijelj 45' | Referee: Ivana Martinčić |

=== Round of 16 ===
| 20 September 2020 | Graničar Županja | 3–0 | Višnjevac | Županja |
| 10:00 | Jelić 15'; Kovačić 29', 36' | Report | | Referee: Dino Zrno (Otok) |

| 20 September 2020 | Katarina Zrinski | 0–2 | Dinamo Zagreb | Orehovica |
| 11:00 | | Report | Zdunić 52'; Crkvenčić 66' | Referee: Patrik Kolarić |

| 20 September 2020 | Međimurje | 0–3 | Agram | Čakovec |
| 16:00 | | Report | Kurkutović 36', 87'; Kalaj 43' | Referee: Jasmin Horvat |

| 20 September 2020 | Frankopan | 0–1 | Pregrada | Sisak |
| 16:30 | | Report | Stanković 54' | Stadium: Galdovo; Referee: Maja Brozović |

| 20 September 2020 | Neretva | 5–1 | Marjan | Metković |
| 16:30 | Borovac 9', 40'; Herceg 25'; Mijoč 33' (pen.); Mandić 74' | Report | Stazić 66' | Stadium: Iza Vage; Referee: Lukša Klaić |

| 20 September 2020 | Osijek | 15–0 | Viktorija | Osijek |
| 17:00 | Balić 1', 7', 26', 37', 50', 52'; Lojna 10', 21', 43', 45'; Andrić 76', 80'; Matanić 82'; Kunštek 87'; Čavić 89' | Report | | Stadium: Igralište Mačkamama; Referee: Mario Vukušić (Višnjevac) |

| 20 September 2020 | Varteks | 0–5 | Rijeka | Rugvica |
| 19:00 | | Report | Jahić 23'; Šulentić 35', 44'; Sudan 64'; Rabuzin 90' (o.g.) |

| 7 October 2020 | Donat | 0–6 | Split | Zadar |
| 16:00 | | Report | Medić 50', 84'; Lubina 65'; Dujmović 70'; Grebenar 71'; Bošnjak 89' | Stadium: Stadion Stanovi; Referee: Zvonimir Sinovčić |

=== Quarter-finals ===
| 7 March 2021 | Dinamo Zagreb | 6–0 | Graničar Županja | Zagreb |
| | Bartolović 4'; Leaković 8'; Crkvenčić 40'; Kederov 57'; Stančić 60', 66' | Report | | Referee: Ivana Martinčić |

| 7 March 2021 | Pregrada | 1–2 | Agram | Pregrada |
| 14:30 | Šćukanec-Hopinski 65' | Report | Mihić 6'; Jakobašić 12' (pen.) | Referee: Jelena Kumer |

| 14 March 2021 | Rijeka | 0–7 | Split | Rijeka |
| 14:00 | | Report | Dujmović 2', 20', 63'; Khimich 17'; Dulčić 35'; Bakalar 61'; Domazet 65' | Referee: Antonio Melnjak |

| 20 March 2021 | Osijek | 13–0 | Neretva | Osijek (Note: Host team reversed after original draw.) |
| 11:00 | Balić 2', 14', 45', 72'; Lojna 19', 24', 34', 39', 47', 62', 64'; Lubina 44'; Mikinac 50' | Report | | Referee: Alen Dobraš |

=== Semi-finals ===
| 3 April 2021 | Dinamo Zagreb | 0–3 | Split | Zagreb |
| 15:00 | | Report | Bošnjak 30'; Pedić 50'; Pranješ 52' | Referee: Ivana Martinčić |

| 26 May 2021 | Agram | 0–5 | Osijek | Zagreb |
| | | Report | Pavičić 5' (o.g.); Nevrkla 49'; Lojna 51'; Kunštek 58'; Balić 79' | Referee: Ivana Martinčić |

=== Final ===
3 June 2021
17:00

| Osijek | 0–0 | Split |
|---|---|---|
| | Report |
Penalties
| Lojna (penalty scored); Nevrkla (penalty missed); Bulut (penalty scored); Lubina (penalty scored); Šalek (penalty scored); Kunštek (penalty missed) | 4–5 | (penalty scored) Bukač; (penalty missed) Bošnjak; (penalty scored) Pranješ; (penalty scored) Domazet; (penalty scored) Bukovec; (penalty scored) Dulčić |

ŠRC Podgora, Krapina
Referee: Ivana Martinčić
