= 2017–18 Croatian Women's Football Cup =

Tournament details
- Country: Croatia
- Venue(s): Gradski stadion, Otočac
- Dates: 21 October 2017 – 10 June 2018
- Teams: 14

Final positions
- Champions: Split (1st title)
- Runner-up: Agram

Tournament statistics
- Matches played: 13
- Goals scored: 78 (6 per match)
- Top goal scorer(s): Ivana Stanić (8)

The 2017–18 Croatian Women's Football Cup was the twenty seventh season of the annual Croatian football cup competition. Fourteen teams participated in the competition, all ten teams from the 2017–18 Croatian Women's First Football League and four teams from second level that applied for competition. The competition began on 21 October 2017 with the first of four rounds and ended on 10 June 2018 with the final at the Gradski stadion in Otočac, a nominally neutral venue. Osijek were defending champions, having won the cup in the previous eleven editions. They were eliminated by ŽNK Split in the quarter-finals who went on to win the cup for the first time after beating Agram in the finals.

== Matches ==
=== Round of 16 ===
21 October 2017	Graničar Đurđevac	3–2	Trnava	Đurđevac
12:00

22 October 2017	Dugopolje 714	3–3 (6–5 p)	Neretva	Dugopolje
16:30

2 November 2017	Dinamo Zagreb	8–1	Pregrada	Zagreb
20:00	Klarić 7', 30', 73'; Leaković 29'; Žagar 42'; Stanić 43', 85'; Karadak 70'	Report	Špoljar 67'

21 February 2018	Osijek	8–0	Viktorija	Osijek
13:00	Andrlić 5'; Balić 10', 28'; Čavić 15'; Nevrkla 33', 85'; Culek 50', 89'	Report

11 March 2018	Marjan	0–5	Split	Split
12:30

11 March 2018	Lepoglava	2–4	Agram	Varaždin
13:00	Krog ?', ?'	Report

=== Quarter-finals ===
18 March 2018	Dugopolje 714	0–10	Dinamo Zagreb	Dugopolje
16:00		Report	Klarić 9'; Stanić 14', 25', 53', 55', 62', 80'; Karadak 20'; Kederov 82'; Leaković 84'

8 April 2018	Graničar Đurđevac	1–3	Katarina Zrinski	Đurđevac
12:00	Balatinec 8'	Report	Cicijelj 20', 30'; Bakač 74'	Stadium: Igralište u Grabrovnici; Attendance: 30; Referee: Kristina Veljačić (Čurlovac)

18 April 2018	Split	4–1	Osijek	Vranjic
13:00	Valušek 12'; Bukač 20'; Balog 24', 76'	Report	Radeljić 90+3'

19 April 2018	Agram	4–1	Rijeka	Zagreb
19:30	Matijević 9'; Pezelj 15'; Mihić 45', 82'	Report	Savčić 78'

=== Semi-finals ===
2 June 2018	Katarina Zrinski	0–6	Split	Čakovec
17:30		Report	Conjar 35', 45'; Lubina 41'; Balog 43'; Horvat 67'; Valušek 68'

3 June 2018	Agram	4–2	Dinamo Zagreb	Zagreb
17:30	Matijević 17', 65'; Tomić 18'; Kopić 90+3' (o.g.)	Report	Klarić 50'; Benković 54'

=== Final ===
10 June 2018
17:00

Agram	1–2	Split
Matijević 13'	Report	Dujmović 16'; Valušek 24'

Gradski stadion, Otočac
Attendance: 200
