= 2020 Croatian Women's Football Cup =

Tournament details
- Country: Croatia
- Dates: 22 February 2020 – 31 May 2020
- Teams: 11

Tournament statistics
- Matches played: 5
- Goals scored: 30 (6 per match)

The 2020 Croatian Women's Football Cup was the twenty-ninth season of the annual Croatian football cup competition. Eleven teams participated in the competition, all eight teams from the 2019–20 Croatian Women's First Football League and three teams from second level that applied for competition. The competition started on 22 February 2020 and was scheduled to end on 31 May 2020. Split were defending champions. Viktorija, Osijek, Lepoglava, Katarina Zrinski and Dinamo Zagreb received bye to the quarter-finals. Due to ongoing COVID-19 pandemic, the last quarter-finals match was postponed indefinitely and ultimately not held.

== Matches ==
=== Round of 16 ===
22 February 2020	Agram	7–0	Rijeka	Zagreb
	Mihić (?); Bučić (?); Resanović (?); Novak (?); ? (?)

22 February 2020	Donat	3–0; Awarded	Marjan	Novigrad
14:00				Stadium: NK Nošk

23 February 2020	Split	9–0	Neretva	Split
14:00	Pezelj (?); Dujmović (?); Bukač (?); Lubina (?); Gegollaj (?); Bošnjak (?)			Stadium: Stadion Park mladeži

=== Quarter-finals ===
1 March 2020	Viktorija	0–7	Osijek	Slavonski Brod
14:00		Report	Balić 1', 22', 81' (pen.); Conjar 7'; Nevrkla 48'; Lojna 70'; Blažević 87'	Stadium: Igralište Jelas; Attendance: 100; Referee: Darko Dumančić (Prkovci)

1 March 2020	Dinamo Zagreb	4–1	Agram	Zagreb
17:00

8 March 2020	Lepoglava	0–2	Katarina Zrinski	Novi Golubovec
		Report	Klarić 20'; Žužić 44'

Split	–	Donat	Split
