= 2018–19 Croatian Women's Football Cup =

Tournament details
- Country: Croatia
- Dates: 6 October 2018 – 9 June 2019
- Teams: 14

Final positions
- Champions: Split (2nd title)
- Runners-up: Osijek

Tournament statistics
- Matches played: 12
- Goals scored: 93 (7.75 per match)
- Top goal scorer(s): Izabela Lojna (13)

The 2018–19 Croatian Women's Football Cup was the twenty-eighth season of the annual Croatian football cup competition. Fourteen teams participated in the competition, all ten teams from the 2018–19 Croatian Women's First Football League and four teams from second level that applied for competition. The competition began on 6 October 2018 and will end on 9 June 2019 with the final in Krapina, a nominally neutral venue. Split were defending champions and successfully defended their title after beating Osijek in the final. Katarina Zrinski and Graničar Đurđevac received bye to the quarter-finals.

== Matches ==
=== Round of 16 ===
6 October 2018	Marjan	1–0	Donat	Split
14:00	Slavica 25'	Report

7 October 2018	Osijek	31–0	Graničar Županja	Osijek
16:00	Balić 3', 18', 25', 33', 36', 42'; Culek 4', 83'; Lojna 7', 22', 23', 28', 30', 47', 57', 61', 66', 80'; Balog 9', 25', 31'; Andrlić 14', 37', 40'; Bulut 17'; Pernar 68'; Kunštek 71'; Šalek 73', 88', 90'	Report		Stadium: Igralište Mačkamama; Attendance: 100; Referee: Nenad Vargović (Virovitica)

7 October 2018	Viktorija	12–0	Mikanovci	Slavonski Brod
16:00	Đukić ?', ?', ?'; Belaj ?', ?'; Jurić ?', ?'; Marjanović ?', ?'; Zdunić ?', ?'; Šimunović ?'	Report

8 October 2018	Agram	5–0	Pregrada	Zagreb
14:00	Matijević ?', ?', ?', ?'; Pezelj ?'	Report

17 October 2018	Split	10–0	Neretva	Split
14:00	Valušek ?', ?'; Dujmović ?', ?'; Bošnjak ?', ?'; Pedić ?'; Driesse ?'; Kolgjeraj ?'; Conjar ?'			Stadium: Stadion Park Mladeži

10 March 2019	Rijeka	1–3	Dinamo Zagreb	Rijeka
13:00	Sudan ?'

=== Quarter-finals ===
7 April 2019	Graničar Đurđevac	1–4	Viktorija	Đurđevac
14:00	Pavlović 78'	Report	Đukić 9'; Kurkutović 39', 67'; Čavić 80'

7 April 2019	Katarina Zrinski	0–0 (3–2 p)	Dinamo Zagreb	Čakovec
16:00		Report

13 April 2019	Marjan	0–8	Osijek	Split
16:00		Report	Maltašić 7'; Balog 15', 29', 32'; Nevrkla 19', 59'; Balić 25'; Bićan 79'

30 April 2019	Split	3–0; Awarded	Agram	Split

=== Semi-finals ===
11 May 2019	Katarina Zrinski	0–12	Split	Čakovec
13:00		Report	Dujmović 39'; Conjar 45', 55', 56', 67', 82', 83'; Spiranovic 60', 71'; Klarić 75' (o.g.); Kolgjeraj 77'

12 May 2019	Viktorija	0–4	Osijek	Slavonski Brod
13:00		Report	Lojna 2', 17'; Balić 24'; Mikinac 86'	Stadium: ŠRC Stanko Vlainić-Dida; Attendance: 50; Referee: Ivan Župan (Bjelovar)

=== Final ===
9 June 2019
17:00

Osijek	0–1	Split
	Report	Bošnjak 80'

ŠRC Podgora, Krapina
Attendance: 300
Referee: Sabina Bolić (Zagreb)
