= Stephanie Bukovec =

Canadian-Croatian footballer (born 1995)

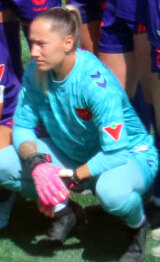
- Bukovec in 2025

Personal information
- Full name: Stephanie Cecilia Bukovec
- Date of birth: September 22, 1995 (age 31)
- Place of birth: Toronto, Ontario, Canada
- Height: 1.73 m (5 ft 8 in)
- Positions: Goalkeeper; striker

Youth career
- Etobicoke SC

College career
Years	Team	Apps	(Gls)
2013–2014	Oakland Golden Grizzlies		
2015–2016	Belmont Bruins		

Senior career*
Years	Team	Apps	(Gls)
2013	Toronto Lady Lynx		
2014	K–W United FC		
2016	Vaughan Azzurri	6	(0)
2017	Töcksfors IF		
2017–2018	PEC Zwolle	16	(0)
2018	Þór/KA	6	(0)
2019	Split		
2019–2020	Ajax	0	(0)
2020–2024	Split		
2024–2025	Standard Liège		
2025	Calgary Wild FC	23	(0)
2026–	Woodbridge Strikers	3	(1)

International career^{‡}
2017–2021	Croatia	4	(0)
- * Club domestic league appearances and goals as of May 3, 2021 ‡ National team caps and goals as of 12 June 2021

Stephanie Cecilia Bukovec (born September 22, 1995) is a footballer who plays for the Woodbridge Strikers in the Ontario Premier League. Born in Canada, she played for the Croatia national team.

== Club career ==
In 2016, she played for Vaughan Azzurri in League1 Ontario. During a League Cup semi-final, after her team went down 2–0 in the first half, she switched to striker, scoring two goals to tie the game, before returning to the goalkeeper position, winning the match in a penalty shootout.

On 10 November 2017, Bukovec was announced at PEC Zwolle.

In July 2018, Bukovec signed with Þór/KA in the Icelandic Úrvalsdeild kvenna. She helped the team advance from the 2018–19 UEFA Women's Champions League qualifying round, being named the Group 1's best player after keeping a clean sheet in all three games.

In January 2019, she signed with ŽNK Split of the Croatian Prva HNLŽ. In May 2019, she scored two goals in a 10–0 win against ŽNK Katarina Zrinski after being playing the last 30 minutes as an attacker. She helped Split win the 2019 Croatian championship, breaking the long-term dominance of ŽNK Osijek. In June she led the club to the Croatian Cup with her performance in the Cup Final victory against Osijek.

On 12 July 2019, Bukovec was announced at Ajax.

On 30 January 2024, Bukovec was announced at Standard Liège.

On 5 March 2025, Bukovec was announced at Calgary Wild. On April 16, 2025, she started in the league's inaugural game, a 1–0 defeat to Vancouver Rise FC.

In 2026,she joined the Woodbridge Strikers in the Ontario Premier League, where she converted to playing striker.

== National team career ==
Bukovec has been capped for the Croatia national team, appearing for the team during the 2019 FIFA Women's World Cup qualifying cycle.

She made her international debut against Hungary on 19 October 2017.

== Personal life ==
Bukovec's father, Boris, was born in Slovenia, while her mother, Helen, was born in Poland. Her grandmother was from Dalmatia in Croatia. Her older brother Matthew played college basketball, her older sister Natalie played football in college before turning to coaching, and twin sister Sophie played professional beach volleyball.
