= 2016–17 Croatian Women's First Football League =

Prva HNLŽ
- Season: 2016–17
- Champions: Osijek
- Relegated: Lepoglava
- Champions League: Osijek
- Matches: 90
- Goals: 529 (5.88 per match)
- Top goalscorer: Mateja Andrlić (39)
- Biggest home win: Osijek 19–0 Marjan
- Biggest away win: Trnava 0–13 Osijek
- Highest scoring: Osijek 19–0 Marjan
- All statistics correct as of 4 June 2017.

The 2016–17 Croatian Women's First Football League (Prva hrvatska nogometna liga za žene) was the twenty sixth season of Croatian Women's First Football League, the national championship for women's association football teams in Croatia, since its establishment in 1992. The season started on 10 September 2016 and ended on 4 June 2017.

The league was contested by ten teams and played in a double round robin format, with each team playing every other team two times over 18 rounds. ŽNK Osijek were the defending champions, having won their twentieth title in 2015–16.

== Teams ==
Locations of teams in 2016–17 Croatian Women's First Football League

The following is a complete list of teams who are contesting the 2016–17 Croatian Women's First Football League.

Team	Location	Stadium(s)	Position in 2015–16
Agram	Zagreb	Stadion Buzin	4th
Katarina Zrinski	Čakovec	Stadion NK Sloga Čakovec	8th
Lepoglava	Lepoglava		1st (2. HNLŽ North-West)
Marjan	Split	Stadion Poljud	5th
Neretva	Metković	Stadion Iza Vage	1st (2. HNLŽ South)
Osijek	Osijek	Mačkamama, Stadion Gradski vrt	1st
Pregrada	Pregrada	Stadion NK Pregrada	6th
Split	Split	Stadion Park Mladeži	2nd
Trnava	Goričan	Stadion Gaj	3rd
Viktorija	Slavonski Brod	Stadion Jelas	9th

== League table ==
Pos	Team	Pld	W	D	L	GF	GA	GD	Pts	Qualification or relegation
1	Osijek (C)	18	18	0	0	157	2	+155	54	Qualification to Champions League qualifying round
2	Agram	18	16	0	2	92	25	+67	48	
3	Split	18	14	0	4	74	32	+42	42	
4	Trnava (Note: Deducted 3 points)	18	7	4	7	36	54	−18	22	
5	Neretva	18	5	5	8	36	63	−27	20	
6	Viktorija	18	4	4	10	29	59	−30	16	
7	Pregrada	18	4	2	12	34	67	−33	14	
8	Katarina Zrinski	18	2	8	8	23	69	−46	14	
9	Marjan	18	4	0	14	26	92	−66	12	
10	Lepoglava (R)	18	2	5	11	22	64	−42	11	Relegation to 2. HNLŽ

Source: soccerway.com HNS.hr
Rules for classification: 1) points; 2) goal difference; 3) number of goals scored
(C) Champions; (R) Relegated

== Results ==
Home \ Away	AGR	KAT	LEP	MAR	NER	OSI	PRE	SPL	TRN	VIK
Agram		7–0	3–1	9–1	12–2	0–4	4–1	5–3	3–1	7–2
Katarina Zrinski	0–3		0–0	4–2	3–3	1–10	1–1	1–2	2–2	1–1
Lepoglava	1–4	2–2		4–0	3–3	0–5	3–2	1–5	0–2	1–3
Marjan	0–6	0–3	3–2		3–1	0–10	6–0	1–2	1–3	1–5
Neretva	1–6	4–0	2–0	3–2		0–10	4–0	1–2	2–1	2–2
Osijek	6–0	14–0	10–0	19–0	5–1		9–0	9–0	3–0	17–0
Pregrada	0–3	5–1	7–0	6–1	4–4	0–7		1–4	0–4	4–2
Split	0–5	10–1	9–0	10–0	4–0	0–3	7–0		6–1	4–1
Trnava	1–8	2–2	2–2	3–2	3–3	0–13	5–3	1–3		2–1
Viktorija	1–7	1–1	2–2	2–3	3–0	0–3	2–0	1–3	0–3	

Updated to match(es) played on 4 June 2017. Source: HNS Soccerway
Legend: Blue = home team win; Yellow = draw; Red = away team win.

== Top scorers ==
Updated to matches played on 4 June 2017.

Rank	Player	Club	Goals
1	(Croatia) Mateja Andrlić	Osijek	39
2	(Croatia) Tomislava Matijević	Agram	31
3	(Croatia) Izabela Lojna	Osijek	28
4	(Croatia) Maja Joščak	Osijek	26
5	(Croatia) Anela Lubina	Split	24
6	(Croatia) Ana Dujmović	Agram	16
7	(Croatia) Perica Cicijelj	Trnava	15
8	(Croatia) Helena Perić	Neretva	13
9	(Croatia) Andrea Valušek	Split	12
10	(Croatia) Petra Glavač	Pregrada	11
10	(Croatia) Doris Tomić	Agram	11
10	(Croatia) Andreja Šćukanec-Hopinski	Katarina Zrinski	11
10	(Croatia) Sandra Žigić	Osijek	11
