= Tamila Khimych =

Ukrainian footballer

Personal information
- Date of birth: 13 September 1994 (age 32)
- Place of birth: Bilorichytsia, Chernihiv Oblast, Ukraine
- Position: Midfielder

Team information
- Current team: Espanyol
- Number: 9

Youth career
- ?-2011: DYuSh Chernihiv

Senior career*
Years	Team	Apps	(Gls)
2010-11	Spartak ShVSM Chernihiv		
2011–2016	Lehenda-ShVSM Chernihiv	69	(43)
2017–2020	FC Minsk	66	(73)
2020–2022	Split		
2022	Kryvbas Kryvyi Rih		
2022–	Espanyol	7	(1)

International career^{‡}
2017–	Ukraine	33	(2)
- * Club domestic league appearances and goals as of 29 May 2022 ‡ National team caps and goals as of 18:10, 1 March 2020 (UTC)

Tamila Khimych (Ukrainian: Таміла Хімич, born 13 September 1994) is a Ukrainian footballer who plays as a midfielder for Spanish Primera Federación club RCD Espanyol and the Ukraine women's national team.

== Career ==
Khimych started her career in Spartak ShVSM Chernihiv then she moved to the main woman's team Lehenda-ShVSM Chernihiv in Chernihiv. Khimych has been capped for the Ukraine national team, appearing for the team during the 2019 FIFA Women's World Cup qualifying cycle.

== Honours ==
- Ukrainian Women's League
  - Runners-up : 2011, 2013, 2015
- Belarusian Premier League:
  - Winners : 2017, 2018, 2019
- Belarusian Women's Cup:
  - Winners : 2017, 2018, 2019
- Croatian First Division:
  - Runners-up: 2021
- Croatian Cup:
  - Winners: 2021

== International goals ==
No.	Date	Venue	Opponent	Score	Result	Competition
1.	19 January 2017	Century Lotus Stadium, Foshan, China	Myanmar	2–0	4–0	2017 Four Nations Tournament
2.	30 November 2021	Várkerti Stadion, Kisvárda, Hungary	Hungary	2–3	2–4	2023 FIFA Women's World Cup qualification
3.	5 April 2024	Mardan Sports Complex, Antalya, Turkey	Kosovo	2–0	2–0	UEFA Women's Euro 2025 qualifying
4.	12 July 2024	Fadil Vokrri Stadium, Pristina, Kosovo	Kosovo	2–0	4–0	UEFA Women's Euro 2025 qualifying
