= 2019–20 Croatian Women's First Football League =

Prva HNLŽ
- Season: 2019–20
- Champions: Split
- Relegated: Lepoglava
- Champions League: Split
- Matches: 79
- Goals: 485 (6.14 per match)
- Top goalscorer: Lorena Balić (42)
- Biggest home win: Split 18–0 Viktorija
- Biggest away win: Agram 0–14 Osijek
- Highest scoring: Split 18–0 Viktorija
- All statistics correct as of 9 August 2020.

The 2019–20 Croatian Women's First Football League (Prva hrvatska nogometna liga za žene) is twenty ninth season of Croatian Women's First Football League, the national championship for women's association football teams in Croatia, since its establishment in 1992. The season started on 22 September 2019.

The league was contested by eight teams, two less than in the previous season. It used competition format last used in 2011–12 season with championship and relegation play-offs. First stage was played in a double round robin format, with each team playing every other team two times over 14 rounds. In a second stage teams were divided in two groups according to the table standings. ŽNK Split were the defending champions, having won their first title in 2018–19.

The league was suspended due to the COVID-19 pandemic in March 2020 and resumed behind closed doors on 13 June 2020.

== Teams ==
Locations of teams in 2019–20 Croatian Women's First Football League

The following is a complete list of teams who have secured a place in the 2019–20 Croatian Women's First Football League.

Team	Location	Stadium(s)	Position in 2018–19
Agram	Zagreb	Stadion Buzin	4th
Dinamo Zagreb	Zagreb	Stadion Maksimir	3rd
Katarina Zrinski	Čakovec	Stadion NK Sloga Čakovec	7th
Lepoglava	Lepoglava		1st (2. HNLŽ North-West)
Neretva	Metković	Stadion Iza Vage	5th
Osijek	Osijek	Mačkamama, Stadion Gradski vrt	2nd
Split	Split	Stadion Park Mladeži	1st
Viktorija	Slavonski Brod	Stadion Jelas	6th

== Regular season ==
=== League table ===
Pos	Team	Pld	W	D	L	GF	GA	GD	Pts	Qualification or relegation
1	Osijek	14	13	0	1	98	7	+91	39 (Note: Head-to-head away goals: Osijek 1, Split 0)	Qualification for the Championship play-offs
2	Split	14	13	0	1	117	3	+114	39	Qualification for the Championship play-offs
3	Dinamo Zagreb	14	10	0	4	56	16	+40	30	Qualification for the Championship play-offs
4	Agram	14	6	0	8	35	65	−30	18	Qualification for the Championship play-offs
5	Neretva	14	5	1	8	23	58	−35	16	Qualification for the Relegation play-offs
6	Viktorija	14	4	0	10	13	77	−64	12	Qualification for the Relegation play-offs
7	Katarina Zrinski	14	2	2	10	12	71	−59	8	Qualification for the Relegation play-offs
8	Lepoglava	14	1	1	12	13	70	−57	4	Qualification for the Relegation play-offs

Updated to match(es) played on 4 July 2020. Source: soccerway.com HNS.hr
Rules for classification: 1) Points; 2) Head-to-head points; 3) Head-to-head goal difference; 4) Head-to-head goals scored (at home if two teams tied); 5) Goal difference; 6) Goals scored; 7) Play-off
(Note: Criteria 2-4 and 7 is only used if deciding champion, teams to international competition or teams for relegation and in that case criteria 6 will not be used).

=== Results ===
Home \ Away	AGR	DIN	KAT	LEP	NER	OSI	SPL	VIK
Agram	—	0–4	5–1	3–2	4–1	0–14	0–9	8–1
Dinamo Zagreb	7–0	—	2–1	3–0	7–0	2–4	1–4	4–0
Katarina Zrinski	0–3	0–6	—	1–1	0–4	0–10	0–2	4–1
Lepoglava	0–10	2–4	1–2	—	5–2	0–11	0–12	2–3
Neretva	4–0	0–4	2–2	4–0	—	0–10	0–6	5–1
Osijek	5–1	3–1	15–1	6–0	6–0	—	1–0	7–0
Split	15–0	2–0	16–0	7–0	13–0	2–1	—	18–0
Viktorija	2–1	0–11	3–0	2–0	0–1	0–5	0–11	—

Updated to match(es) played on 5 July 2020. Source: HNS.hr
Legend: Blue = home team win; Yellow = draw; Red = away team win.
For upcoming matches, an "a" indicates there is an article about the rivalry between the two participants.

== Play-offs ==
=== Championship play-offs ===
==== League table ====
Pos	Team	Pld	W	D	L	GF	GA	GD	Pts	Qualification or relegation
1	Split	20	18	0	2	152	8	+144	54 (Note: Head-to-head goal difference: Split +3 (10), Osijek –3 (7))	Qualification to Champions League qualifying round
2	Osijek	20	18	0	2	135	16	+119	54	
3	Dinamo Zagreb	20	11	0	9	61	35	+26	33	
4	Agram	20	7	0	13	36	110	−74	21	

Updated to match(es) played on 9 August 2020. Source: HNS.hr
Rules for classification: 1) Points; 2) Head-to-head points; 3) Head-to-head goal difference; 4) Head-to-head goals scored (at home if two teams tied); 5) Goal difference; 6) Goals scored; 7) Play-off
(Note: Criteria 2-4 and 7 is only used if deciding champion, teams to international competition or teams for relegation and in that case criteria 6 will not be used).

==== Results ====
Home \ Away	AGR	DIN	OSI	SPL
Agram	—	0–4	0–10	0–5
Dinamo Zagreb	0–1	—	0–2	0–9
Osijek	16–0	4–1	—	4–1
Split	10–0	3–0	7–1	—

Updated to match(es) played on 9 August 2020. Source: HNS.hr
Legend: Blue = home team win; Yellow = draw; Red = away team win.
For upcoming matches, an "a" indicates there is an article about the rivalry between the two participants.

=== Relegation play-offs ===
==== League table ====
Pos	Team	Pld	W	D	L	GF	GA	GD	Pts	Qualification or relegation
5	Neretva	20	7	2	11	34	71	−37	23	
6	Katarina Zrinski	20	7	2	11	25	74	−49	23	
7	Viktorija	20	7	1	12	27	85	−58	22	Qualification to Relegation play-off
8	Lepoglava (R)	20	2	1	17	19	90	−71	7	Relegation to 2. HNLŽ

Updated to match(es) played on 9 August 2020. Source: HNS.hr
Rules for classification: 1) Points; 2) Head-to-head points; 3) Head-to-head goal difference; 4) Head-to-head goals scored (at home if two teams tied); 5) Goal difference; 6) Goals scored; 7) Play-off
(Note: Criteria 2-4 and 7 is only used if deciding champion, teams to international competition or teams for relegation and in that case criteria 6 will not be used).
(R) Relegated

==== Results ====
Home \ Away	KAT	LEP	NER	VIK
Katarina Zrinski	—	4–0	0–1	2–0
Lepoglava	0–2	—	3–0 (Note: The Lepoglava v Neretva match was interrupted in 36th minute at the result 1–1, after Neretva was left with only six infield players (they started the match with nine players).)	3–5
Neretva	2–4	6–0	—	2–2
Viktorija	0–1	3–0	4–0	—

Updated to match(es) played on 9 August 2020. Source: HNS.hr
Legend: Blue = home team win; Yellow = draw; Red = away team win.
For upcoming matches, an "a" indicates there is an article about the rivalry between the two participants.

==== Relegation play-off ====
At the end of season, seventh placed Viktorija qualified for a home and away relegation playoff tie against a team from second level. However, sixth placed Katarina Zrinski failed to get a licence for top-level football and were demoted to second level. Viktorija automatically avoided relegation and qualified for 2020–21 Croatian Women's First Football League. 2019–20 Croatian Women's Second Football League was suspended in March due to COVID-19 and was not resumed after. Top two teams at the time of suspension, Donat and Marjan qualified for the 2020–21 Croatian Women's First Football League.

== Top scorers ==
Updated to matches played on 9 August 2020.

Rank	Player	Club	Goals
1	(Croatia) Lorena Balić	Osijek	42
2	(Croatia) Izabela Lojna	Osijek	34
3	(Croatia) Monika Conjar	Osijek	25
3	(Croatia) Anela Lubina	Split	25
5	(Bosnia and Herzegovina) Aida Hadžić	Split	20
6	(Croatia) Ivana Stanić	Dinamo Zagreb	19
7	(Croatia) Ana Dujmović	Split	18
8	(Croatia) Kristjana Kolgjeraj	Split	17
9	(Croatia) Matea Bošnjak	Split	15
9	(Croatia) Melani Mihić	Agram	15
