= Soumya Guguloth =

Indian footballer (born 2001)

Personal information
- Date of birth: 18 July 2001 (age 25)
- Place of birth: Kunepally, Nizamabad district, Telangana, India
- Height: 1.58 m (5 ft 2 in)
- Position: Midfielder

Team information
- Current team: East Bengal
- Number: 7

Senior career*
Years	Team	Apps	(Gls)
2017–2018	India Rush SC		
2019–2020	Kenkre	6	(7)
2021–2022	Gokulam Kerala	11	(7)
2022–2023	Dinamo Zagreb	4	(0)
2023–	Gokulam Kerala	12	(7)
2024–	East Bengal		

International career^{‡}
2015	India U14		
2016	India U16	4	(3)
2016–2018	India U19	3	(1)
2021–	India	43	(7)
- * Club domestic league appearances and goals as of 24 March 2024 ‡ National team caps and goals as of 6 June 2026

Soumya Guguloth (born 18 July 2001) is an Indian professional footballer who plays as a midfielder for the Indian Women's League club East Bengal and the India women's national team.

== Early life ==
Guguloth hails from Kunepally located in Nizamabad district.

== Club career ==
Soumya has played for Kenkre in Indian Women's League, before signing with Gokulam Kerala in 2021. She also participated in 2021 AFC Women's Club Championship, where they sealed their third place.

On 13 July 13, 2022, it was announced that she, along with Jyoti Chauhan, have been invited to give trials at the Prva hrvatska nogometna liga za žene side ŽNK Dinamo Zagreb. They were selected by the club's assistant coach, Mia Medvedoski, when she attended the "Sports Elite Trials" held from 6–11 June in Kolkata. On 1 September, she was signed by the club.

Soumya made her Croatian Women's League debut on 20 November 2022. On 5 March 2023, she scored her first goal for ŽNK Dinamo Zagreb in the Croatian Women's Football Cup Round of 16 match.

== International career ==
After representing India at various youth international levels, Soumya made her senior debut for the national team on 8 April 2021 in a 0–1 friendly away loss to Uzbekistan. On 7 September 2022, at the SAFF Women's Championship in Nepal, she scored her first international goal against Pakistan in their 3–0 win. Later on 10 September, she again scored a goal against the Maldives as they clinched a 9–0 victory.

== Career statistics ==
=== International ===
As of 6 June 2026

National team	Year	Caps	Goals
India	2021	8	0
India	2022	5	2
India	2023	8	2
India	2024	10	1
India	2025	6	2
India	2026	6	0
Total		43	7

Scores and results list India's goal tally first.

List of international goals scored by Soumya Guguloth
No.	Date	Venue	Opponent	Score	Result	Competition
1.	7 September 2022	Dasharath Rangasala, Kathmandu, Nepal	Pakistan	3–0	3–0	2022 SAFF Women's Championship
2.	10 September 2022	Dasharath Rangasala, Kathmandu, Nepal	Maldives	5–0	9–0	2022 SAFF Women's Championship
3.	15 February 2023	Jawaharlal Nehru Stadium, Chennai, India	Nepal	1–0	2–2	Friendly
4.	4 April 2023	Dolen Omurzakov Stadium, Bishkek, Kyrgyzstan	Kyrgyzstan	3–0	5–0	2024 Olympic Qualifiers
5.	24 February 2024	Gold City Sports Complex, Alanya, Turkey	Hong Kong	2–0	2–0	2024 Turkish Women's Cup
6.	23 June 2025	700th Anniversary Stadium, Chiang Mai, Thailand	Mongolia	2–0	13–0	2026 AFC Women's Asian Cup qualification
7.	23 June 2025	700th Anniversary Stadium, Chiang Mai, Thailand	Mongolia	8–0	13–0	2026 AFC Women's Asian Cup qualification

== Honours ==
India

- SAFF Women's Championship: 2026

East Bengal

- SAFF Women's Club Championship: 2025
- Indian Women's League: 2024–25, 2025–26

Gokulam Kerala

- Indian Women's League: 2021–22

Dinamo Zagreb

- Croatian Women's Football Cup runner-up: 2022–23

Kenkre

- WIFA Women's Football League: 2019–20

== Awards ==
Guguloth won the Women's Player of the Year award by AIFF for 2024.

== See also ==
- List of Indian football players in foreign leagues
