= Branka Karnjus =

Croatian footballer

Personal information
- Full name: Branka Karnjus
- Date of birth: 28 November 1973 (age 52)
- Place of birth: SFR Yugoslavia
- Position: Goalkeeper

Senior career*
Years	Team	Apps	(Gls)
2009–2010	Krka Novo Mesto		
2010–2013	ŽNK Rijeka		

International career
	Croatia	4	
- * Club domestic league appearances and goals

Branka Karnjus is a Croatian football goalkeeper. She played for Krka Novo Mesto in Slovenia's Women's League and the 2009–10 Champions League and ŽNK Rijeka in Croatia's First Division.

She played the 2011 World Cup qualification for the Croatian national team.
