= 2021–22 Croatian Women's First Football League =

Prva HNLŽ
- Season: 2021–22
- Champions: Split
- Relegated: Neretva
- Champions League: Split
- Matches: 82
- Goals: 495 (6.04 per match)
- Top goalscorer: Lorena Balić (33)
- Biggest home win: Osijek 25–0 Neretva
- Biggest away win: Neretva 0–15 Split
- Highest scoring: Osijek 25–0 Neretva
- All statistics correct as of 29 May 2022.

The 2021–22 Croatian Women's First Football League (Croatian: Prva hrvatska nogometna liga za žene) was the 31st season of Croatian Women's First Football League, the national championship for women's association football teams in Croatia, since its establishment in 1992. The season started on 5 September 2021 and ended on 29 May 2022.

The league was contested by eight teams. First stage was played in a double round robin format, with each team playing every other team two times over 14 rounds. In a second stage teams were divided in two groups according to the table standings. ŽNK Osijek were the defending champions, having won their 23rd title in 2020–21.

== Teams ==
Locations of teams in 2021–22 Croatian Women's First Football League

The following is a complete list of teams who have secured a place in the 2021–22 Croatian Women's First Football League.

Team	Location	Stadium(s)	Position in 2020–21
Agram	Zagreb	Stadion Buzin	4th
Dinamo Zagreb	Zagreb	Stadion Maksimir	3rd
Donat	Zadar	Stadion Stanovi	5th
Međimurje-Čakovec	Čakovec	Stadion SRC Mladost	1st (2. HNLŽ B)
Neretva	Metković	Stadion Iza Vage	6th
Osijek	Osijek	Mačkamama, Stadion Gradski vrt	1st
Rijeka	Rijeka	Stadion Kantrida	1st (2. HNLŽ A)
Split	Split	Stadion Park Mladeži	2nd

== Regular season ==
=== League table ===
Pos	Team	Pld	W	D	L	GF	GA	GD	Pts	Qualification or relegation
1	Osijek	14	12	1	1	104	8	+96	37	Qualification for the Championship play-offs
2	Split	14	12	1	1	92	5	+87	37	Qualification for the Championship play-offs
3	Dinamo Zagreb	14	11	0	3	58	11	+47	33	Qualification for the Championship play-offs
4	Rijeka	14	6	1	7	32	41	−9	19	Qualification for the Championship play-offs
5	Agram	14	5	1	8	35	41	−6	16	Qualification for the Relegation play-offs
6	Međimurje-Čakovec	14	5	0	9	19	71	−52	15	Qualification for the Relegation play-offs
7	Donat	14	2	1	11	17	56	−39	7	Qualification for the Relegation play-offs
8	Neretva	14	0	1	13	2	126	−124	1	Qualification for the Relegation play-offs

Updated to match(es) played on 19 April 2022. Source: soccerway.com HNS.hr
Rules for classification: 1) Points; 2) Head-to-head points; 3) Head-to-head goal difference; 4) Head-to-head goals scored (at home if two teams tied); 5) Goal difference; 6) Goals scored; 7) Play-off
(Note: Criteria 2-4 and 7 is only used if deciding champion, teams to international competition or teams for relegation and in that case criteria 6 will not be used).

=== Results ===
Home \ Away	AGR	DIN	DON	MEĐ	NER	OSI	RIJ	SPL
Agram	—	0–4	2–3	8–0	10–0	1–8	1–2	0–1
Dinamo Zagreb	2–1	—	4–0	6–0	12–0	1–3	5–0	1–0
Donat	0–4	0–6	—	2–4	8–0	0–5	0–7	0–5
Međimurje-Čakovec	0–3	0–5	4–2	—	4–0	0–13	3–1	0–7
Neretva	1–3	1–8	0–0	0–4	—	0–3	0–3	0–15
Osijek	5–0	4–0	9–0	11–0	25–0	—	8–0	0–4
Rijeka	1–1	0–4	3–1	3–0	12–0	0–8	—	0–1
Split	14–1	2–0	3–1	10–0	19–0	2–2	9–0	—

Updated to match(es) played on 19 April 2022. Source: HNS.hr
Legend: Blue = home team win; Yellow = draw; Red = away team win.
For upcoming matches, an "a" indicates there is an article about the rivalry between the two participants.

== Play-offs ==
=== Championship play-offs ===
==== League table ====
Pos	Team	Pld	W	D	L	GF	GA	GD	Pts	Qualification or relegation
1	Split (C)	20	16	2	2	117	10	+107	50	Qualification for the Champions League first round
2	Osijek	20	15	2	3	132	14	+118	47	
3	Dinamo Zagreb	20	15	0	5	75	20	+55	45	
4	Rijeka	20	6	1	13	32	91	−59	19	

Updated to match(es) played on 29 May 2022. Source: HNS.hr
Rules for classification: 1) Points; 2) Head-to-head points; 3) Head-to-head goal difference; 4) Head-to-head goals scored (at home if two teams tied); 5) Goal difference; 6) Goals scored; 7) Play-off
(Note: Criteria 2-4 and 7 is only used if deciding champion, teams to international competition or teams for relegation and in that case criteria 6 will not be used).
(C) Champions

==== Results ====
Home \ Away	DIN	OSI	RIJ	SPL
Dinamo Zagreb	—	2–1	2–0	2–1
Osijek	4–1	—	8–0	1–1
Rijeka	0–8	0–14	—	0–7
Split	3–2	2–0	11–0	—

Updated to match(es) played on 29 May 2022. Source: HNS.hr
Legend: Blue = home team win; Yellow = draw; Red = away team win.
For upcoming matches, an "a" indicates there is an article about the rivalry between the two participants.

=== Relegation play-offs ===
==== League table ====
Pos	Team	Pld	W	D	L	GF	GA	GD	Pts	Qualification or relegation
5	Agram	20	9	2	9	57	53	+4	29	
6	Međimurje-Čakovec	20	9	1	10	41	80	−39	28	
7	Donat (O)	20	4	1	15	31	76	−45	13	Qualification to Relegation play-off
8	Neretva (R)	20	1	1	18	10	151	−141	4	Relegation to 2. HNLŽ

Updated to match(es) played on 29 May 2022. Source: HNS.hr
Rules for classification: 1) Points; 2) Head-to-head points; 3) Head-to-head goal difference; 4) Head-to-head goals scored (at home if two teams tied); 5) Goal difference; 6) Goals scored; 7) Play-off
(Note: Criteria 2-4 and 7 is only used if deciding champion, teams to international competition or teams for relegation and in that case criteria 6 will not be used).
(O) Play-off winners; (R) Relegated

==== Results ====
Home \ Away	AGR	DON	MEĐ	NER
Agram	—	7–3	3–2	4–1
Donat	1–4	—	3–4	3–1
Međimurje-Čakovec	2–2	2–0	—	6–1
Neretva	3–2	2–4	0–6	—

Updated to match(es) played on 29 May 2022. Source: HNS.hr
Legend: Blue = home team win; Yellow = draw; Red = away team win.
For upcoming matches, an "a" indicates there is an article about the rivalry between the two participants.

==== Relegation play-off ====
At the end of the season, seventh placed Donat will contest a two-legged relegation play-off tie against the losing team of promotion play-off tie between Hajduk Split and Viktorija.

===== First leg =====
5 June 2022
18:00

Donat	4–0	Viktorija
Ivandić 55' (pen.), 90' (pen.); Ćubić 88'; Čavić 90+3'	Report

Stadion Stanovi, Zadar
Attendance: 500
Referee: Jelena Pejković

===== Second leg =====
12 June 2022

Viktorija	0–5	Donat
	Report

Slavonski Brod

Donat won 9–0 on aggregate.

== Top scorers ==
Updated to matches played on 29 May 2022.

Rank	Player	Club	Goals
1	(Croatia) Lorena Balić	Osijek	33
2	(Croatia) Izabela Lojna	Osijek	25
3	(Bosnia and Herzegovina) Aida Hadžić	Split	24
4	(Israel) Koral Hazan	Split	21
5	(Croatia) Karla Kurkutović	Dinamo Zagreb	20
6	(Croatia) Maja Joščak	Osijek	15
6	(Croatia) Sandra Žigić	Agram	15
8	(Bosnia and Herzegovina) Merjema Medić	Osijek	13
9	(Croatia) Petra Mikulica	Rijeka	12
10	(Bosnia and Herzegovina) Andrea Grebenar	Split	11
10	(Croatia) Ivana Stanić	Dinamo Zagreb	11
10	(Japan) Ayuri Terawaki	Međimurje-Čakovec	11
