= 2018–19 Croatian Women's First Football League =

Prva HNLŽ
- Season: 2018–19
- Champions: Split
- Relegated: Pregrada; Marjan; Rijeka
- Champions League: Split
- Matches: 89
- Goals: 455 (5.11 per match)
- Top goalscorer: Lorena Balić (58)
- Biggest home win: Osijek 13–0 Pregrada; Split 13–0 Rijeka
- Biggest away win: Katarina Zrinski 0–10 Split
- Highest scoring: Osijek 13–0 Pregrada; Split 13–0 Rijeka
- All statistics correct as of 2 June 2019.

The 2018–19 Croatian Women's First Football League (Prva hrvatska nogometna liga za žene) was the twenty eight season of Croatian Women's First Football League, the national championship for women's association football teams in Croatia, since its establishment in 1992. The season started on 22 September 2018 and ended on 2 June 2019.

The league was contested by ten teams and played in a double round robin format, with each team playing every other team two times over 18 rounds. ŽNK Osijek were the defending champions, having won their twenty second title in 2017–18.

== Teams ==
Locations of teams in 2018–19 Croatian Women's First Football League

The following is a complete list of teams who are contesting the 2018–19 Croatian Women's First Football League.

Team	Location	Stadium(s)	Position in 2017–18
Agram	Zagreb	Stadion Buzin	3rd
Dinamo Zagreb	Zagreb	Stadion Maksimir	1st (2. HNLŽ North-West)
Katarina Zrinski	Čakovec	Stadion NK Omladinac Novo Selo Rok	6th
Marjan	Split	Stadion Poljud	9th
Neretva	Metković	Stadion Iza Vage	5th
Osijek	Osijek	Mačkamama, Stadion Gradski vrt	1st
Pregrada	Pregrada	Stadion NK Pregrada	7th
Rijeka	Rijeka		4th
Split	Split	Stadion Park Mladeži	2nd
Viktorija	Slavonski Brod	Stadion Jelas	8th

== League table ==
Pos	Team	Pld	W	D	L	GF	GA	GD	Pts	Qualification or relegation
1	Split	18	17	1	0	105	6	+99	52	Qualification to Champions League qualifying round
2	Osijek	18	16	1	1	117	9	+108	49	
3	Dinamo Zagreb	18	10	1	7	52	35	+17	31	
4	Agram	18	9	0	9	36	37	−1	27	
5	Neretva	18	8	2	8	40	43	−3	26	
6	Viktorija	18	6	3	9	23	54	−31	21	
7	Katarina Zrinski	18	5	4	9	24	65	−41	19 (Note: Head-to-head points: Katarina Zrinski 6, Pregrada 0)	
8	Pregrada (R)	18	6	1	11	21	69	−48	19	Relegation to 2. HNLŽ
9	Marjan (R)	18	5	3	10	34	57	−23	18	Relegation to 2. HNLŽ
10	Rijeka (Note: Deducted 3 points) (R)	18	0	0	18	7	84	−77	−3	Relegation to 2. HNLŽ

Source: soccerway.com HNS.hr
Rules for classification: 1) Points; 2) Head-to-head points; 3) Head-to-head goal difference; 4) Head-to-head goals scored (at home if two teams tied); 5) Goal difference; 6) Goals scored; 7) Play-off
(Note: Criteria 2-4 and 7 is only used if deciding champion, teams to international competition or teams for relegation and in that case criteria 6 will not be used).
(R) Relegated

== Results ==
Home \ Away	AGR	DIN	KAT	MAR	NER	OSI	PRE	RIJ	SPL	VIK
Agram	—	4–0	1–2	6–3	3–0	0–7	3–0	1–0	0–1	6–2
Dinamo Zagreb	2–0	—	1–0	1–2	2–1	1–4	6–0	9–0	0–3	8–0
Katarina Zrinski	0–6	0–6	—	2–2	0–0	0–8	3–0	3–0 (Note: The Katarina Zrinski v Rijeka match was awarded as a 3–0 win to Katarina Zrinski and Rijeka were also deducted two points, after Rijeka failed to appear.)	0–10	0–3
Marjan	3–0	1–3	0–0	—	1–3	0–3	2–3	6–3	0–8	2–0
Neretva	0–3	2–2	8–1	6–0	—	0–8	5–0	6–0	1–8	2–1
Osijek	5–0	8–0	9–1	9–0	6–1	—	13–0	3–0 (Note: The Osijek v Rijeka match was interrupted in 10th minute at the result 3–0 for Osijek, after Rijeka was left with only six infield players (they started the match with seven players). Rijeka were also deducted one point.)	3–3	11–0
Pregrada	2–1	1–5	1–7	4–3	1–2	0–7	—	3–0	0–3	2–0
Rijeka	1–2	0–4	1–4	0–7	0–3	1–7	1–2	—	0–5	0–4
Split	8–0	6–0	8–0	5–1	5–0	2–0	6–0	13–0	—	6–0
Viktorija	1–0	3–2	1–1	1–1	2–0	0–6	2–2	2–0	1–5	—

Updated to match(es) played on 2 June 2019. Source: Prva HNL (in Croatian)
Legend: Blue = home team win; Yellow = draw; Red = away team win.
For upcoming matches, an "a" indicates there is an article about the rivalry between the two participants.

== Top scorers ==
Updated to matches played on 2 June 2019.

Rank	Player	Club	Goals
1	(Croatia) Lorena Balić	Osijek	58
2	(Croatia) Leonarda Balog	Osijek	19
2	(Croatia) Ana Dujmović	Split	19
4	(Croatia) Monika Conjar	Split	15
4	(Croatia) Ivana Stanić	Dinamo Zagreb	15
4	(Croatia) Martina Šalek	Osijek	15
4	(Croatia) Veronika Terzić	Neretva	15
8	(Croatia) Mateja Andrlić	Osijek	13
8	(Croatia) Izabela Lojna	Osijek	13
10	(Croatia) Anela Lubina	Split	12
10	(Croatia) Sara Skendrović	Dinamo Zagreb	12
