= ŽNK Katarina Zrinski =

- Full name: Ženski nogometni klub Katarina Zrinski
- Founded: 1 July 2012; 12 years ago
- Ground: Stadion NK Omladinac, Novo Selo Rok
- Capacity: 1,000
- League: First Division
- 2020–21: Second Division - A, 3rd

ŽNK Katarina Zrinski is a Croatian women's association football club based in Čakovec. The club was founded in 2012.

== Recent seasons ==
Season	Division	P	W	D	L	F	A	Pts	Pos	Cup	Player	Goals
Season	League									Cup	Top goalscorer	
2012–13	2. HNLŽ North-West	16	12	1	3			37	3rd			
2013–14	2. HNLŽ North-West	15	13	0	2	77	10	39	1st	R16	Damjana Antolin	24
2014–15	1. HNLŽ	17	3	1	13	15	64	10	8th	R1	Damjana Antolin	6
2015–16	1. HNLŽ	18	5	1	12	28	69	16	8th		Martina Krog	14
2016–17	1. HNLŽ	18	2	8	8	23	69	14	8th	QF	Andreja Šćukanec-Hopinski	11
2017–18	1. HNLŽ	18	5	3	10	15	78	18	6th	SF	Dijana Bakač, Sara Klarić	4
2018–19	1. HNLŽ	18	5	4	9	24	65	19	7th	SF	Perica Cicijelj	10
2019–20	1. HNLŽ	20	7	2	11	25	74	23	6th	SF	Perica Cicijelj	8
2020–21	2. HNLŽ A	12	9	0	3	55	22	27	3rd	R16	Perica Cicijelj	24
