= 2012–13 Croatian Women's First Football League =

Prva HNLŽ
- Season: 2012–13
- Champions: Osijek
- Relegated: Viktorija
- Champions League: Osijek
- Matches: 63
- Goals: 386 (6.13 per match)
- Top goalscorer: Maja Joščak (39)
- Biggest home win: Osijek 16–0 Marjan
- Biggest away win: Marjan 0–13 Osijek
- Highest scoring: Osijek 16–0 Marjan

The 2012–13 Croatian Women's First Football League (Prva hrvatska nogometna liga za žene) was the twenty-second season of Croatian Women's First Football League, the national championship for women's association football teams in Croatia, since its establishment in 1992.

The league was contested by 7 teams. ŽNK Osijek were the defending champions, having won their sixteenth title in 2011–12.

== League table ==
Pos	Team	Pld	W	D	L	GF	GA	GD	Pts	Qualification or relegation
1	Osijek	18	18	0	0	173	5	+168	54	Qualification to Champions League qualifying round
2	Rijeka-Jack Pot	18	13	1	4	45	32	+13	40	
3	Agram	18	9	2	7	58	55	+3	29	
4	Pregrada	18	7	1	10	35	65	−30	22	
5	Dinamo-Maksimir	18	6	3	9	33	45	−12	21	
6	Marjan (Note: Deducted 1 point)	18	4	1	13	24	89	−65	12	
7	Viktorija	18	2	0	16	18	95	−77	6	Relegation to 2. HLNŽ

Source: rsssf.com
Rules for classification: 1) points; 2) goal difference; 3) number of goals scored

== Results ==
=== First round ===
Home \ Away	AGR	DIN	MAR	OSI	PRE	RIJ	VIK
Agram	—	0–0	6–2	0–8	1–0	2–3	13–1
Dinamo-Maksimir	1–2	—	4–1	0–4	1–1	1–2	6–2
Marjan	1–3	0–4	—	0–11	2–5	0–0	3–2
Osijek	10–0	11–0	16–0	—	10–0	14–0	11–0
Pregrada	1–5	0–2	3–1	0–6	—	1–2	3–1
Rijeka-Jack Pot	2–3	2–0	4–0	1–3	8–0	—	3–0
Viktorija	2–9	2–3	3–0	0–11	0–2	0–1	—

Source: rsssf.com
Legend: Blue = home team win; Yellow = draw; Red = away team win.

=== Second round ===
Home \ Away	AGR	DIN	MAR	OSI	PRE	RIJ	VIK
Agram	—	—	—	3–9	2–3	—	3–0
Dinamo-Maksimir	2–2	—	7–0	0–3	—	—	—
Marjan	8–3	—	—	0–13	4–0	—	—
Osijek	—	—	—	—	15–0	5–1	13–0
Pregrada	—	6–2	—	—	—	2–3	8–0
Rijeka-Jack Pot	2–1	2–0	5–0	—	—	—	—
Viktorija	—	5–0	0–2	—	—	0–4	—

Source: rsssf.com
Legend: Blue = home team win; Yellow = draw; Red = away team win.
