= Petra Glavač =

Croatian footballer

Personal information
- Full name: Petra Glavač
- Date of birth: 12 May 1982 (age 44)
- Place of birth: SFR Yugoslavia
- Position: Striker

Senior career*
Years	Team	Apps	(Gls)
- Maksimir
- Rijeka
2011–present	Agram		

International career
2000–present	Croatia	9	(1)
- * Club domestic league appearances and goals

Petra Glavač is a Croatian football striker currently playing for ŽNK Agram in the Croatian First Division and the Croatian national team. She previously played for ŽNK Maksimir (with which she played the European Cup) and ŽNK Rijeka.

She made her two first appearances for Croatia in 2000 against the Czech Republic. Following a third cap in 2003 she wasn't called up for years, but she returned in 2010, and in October 2011 she scored her first goal in a 3–3 draw against Slovenia.
