= 2017–18 Croatian Women's First Football League =

Prva HNLŽ
- Season: 2017–18
- Champions: Osijek
- Relegated: Trnava
- Champions League: Osijek
- Matches: 89
- Goals: 598 (6.72 per match)
- Top goalscorer: Lorena Balić (61)
- Biggest home win: Osijek 24–0 Trnava
- Biggest away win: Trnava 0–24 Osijek
- Highest scoring: Trnava 0–24 Osijek; Osijek 24–0 Trnava
- All statistics correct as of 20 May 2018.

The 2017–18 Croatian Women's First Football League (Prva hrvatska nogometna liga za žene) was the twenty seventh season of Croatian Women's First Football League, the national championship for women's association football teams in Croatia, since its establishment in 1992. The season started on 23 September 2017 and ended on 20 May 2018.

The league was contested by ten teams and played in a double round robin format, with each team playing every other team two times over 18 rounds. ŽNK Osijek were the defending champions, having won their twenty first title in 2016–17.

== Teams ==
Locations of teams in 2017–18 Croatian Women's First Football League

The following is a complete list of teams who are contesting the 2017–18 Croatian Women's First Football League.

Team	Location	Stadium(s)	Position in 2016–17
Agram	Zagreb	Stadion Buzin	2nd
Katarina Zrinski	Čakovec	Stadion NK Sloga Čakovec	8th
Marjan	Split	Stadion Poljud	9th
Neretva	Metković	Stadion Iza Vage	5th
Osijek	Osijek	Mačkamama, Stadion Gradski vrt	1st
Pregrada	Pregrada	Stadion NK Pregrada	7th
Rijeka	Rijeka	Stadion Kantrida	Promoted
Split	Split	Stadion Park Mladeži	3rd
Trnava	Goričan	Stadion Gaj	4th
Viktorija	Slavonski Brod	Stadion Jelas	6th

== League table ==
Pos	Team	Pld	W	D	L	GF	GA	GD	Pts	Qualification or relegation
1	Osijek	18	18	0	0	209	2	+207	54	Qualification to Champions League qualifying round
2	Split	18	16	0	2	114	9	+105	48	
3	Agram	18	12	1	5	89	35	+54	37	
4	Rijeka	18	8	5	5	54	69	−15	29	
5	Neretva (Note: Deducted 1 point after fielding an ineligible player)	18	8	4	6	37	54	−17	27	
6	Katarina Zrinski	18	5	3	10	15	78	−63	18	
7	Pregrada	18	5	1	12	31	77	−46	16	
8	Viktorija	18	4	3	11	23	94	−71	15	
9	Marjan	18	3	2	13	25	91	−66	11	
10	Trnava	18	1	1	16	17	105	−88	4	Relegation to 2. HNLŽ

Updated to match(es) played on 20 May 2018. Source: soccerway.com HNS.hr
Rules for classification: 1) points; 2) goal difference; 3) number of goals scored

== Results ==
Home \ Away	AGR	KAT	MAR	NER	OSI	PRE	RIJ	SPL	TRN	VIK
Agram	—	4–0	6–1	8–0	0–9	9–0	2–2	1–4	7–1	7–0
Katarina Zrinski	0–7	—	2–1	0–0	0–8	2–1	0–3	0–11	1–0	3–2
Marjan	0–8	1–2	—	4–5	0–9	2–5	0–0	0–9	3–0	1–6
Neretva	3–2	4–0	0–3 (Note: The Neretva v Marjan match was awarded as a 3–0 win to Marjan and Neretva were also deducted one point, after Neretva fielded an ineligible player. Neretva originally won the match 5–1.)	—	0–10	4–0	1–1	0–3	6–0	1–1
Osijek	8–1	15–0	18–0	10–0	—	11–0	12–0	1–0	24–0	12–0
Pregrada	0–9	2–1	2–2	0–4	0–8	—	1–5	0–5	2–1	11–1
Rijeka	0–7	8–0	3–0	1–1	0–19	5–2	—	1–6	2–1	20–0
Split	5–0	7–0	9–1	10–1	0–2	5–1	15–0	—	7–1	5–0
Trnava	2–6	2–2	3–4	0–3	0–24	3–2	1–2	0–6	—	0–1
Viktorija	0–5	2–2	4–2	1–4	1–9	0–2	1–1	0–7	3–2	—

Updated to match(es) played on 20 May 2018. Source: Prva HNL (in Croatian)
Legend: Blue = home team win; Yellow = draw; Red = away team win.
For upcoming matches, an "a" indicates there is an article about the rivalry between the two participants.

== Top scorers ==
Updated to matches played on 20 May 2018.

Rank	Player	Club	Goals
1	(Croatia) Lorena Balić	Osijek	61
2	(Croatia) Mateja Andrlić	Osijek	50
3	(Croatia) Monika Conjar	Split	31
4	(Croatia) Izabela Lojna	Osijek	24
4	(Croatia) Melani Mihić	Agram	24
6	(Croatia) Anela Lubina	Split	21
7	(Croatia) Tomislava Matijević	Agram	20
8	(Croatia) Ana Dujmović	Split	18
9	(Croatia) Petra Pezelj	Agram	17
9	(Croatia) Veronika Terzić	Neretva	17
