= ŽNK Neretva =

- Full name: Ženski nogometni klub Neretva
- Founded: March 2014; 12 years ago
- Ground: Iza Vage
- Capacity: 3,000
- President: Ivan Daničić
- Head coach: Marijo Batinović
- League: Second Division
Home colours	Away colours	Third colours

ŽNK Neretva is a Croatian professional women's football club based in Metković. The club was founded in 2014 and it has competed in the Croatian First Division.

== Recent seasons ==
Season	Division	P	W	D	L	F	A	Pts	Pos	Cup	Player	Goals
Season	League									Cup	Top goalscorer	
2014–15	2. HNLŽ South	12	7	1	4	32	17	22	2nd	PR	Huma Čolaković, Ivana Ćubić	5
2015–16	2. HNLŽ South								1st			
2016–17	1. HNLŽ	18	5	5	8	36	63	20	5th	R16	Helena Perić	13
2017–18	1. HNLŽ	18	8	4	6	37	54	27	5th	R16	Veronika Terzić	17
2018–19	1. HNLŽ	18	8	2	8	40	43	26	5th	R16	Veronika Terzić	15
2019–20	1. HNLŽ	20	7	2	11	34	71	23	5th	R16	Veronika Terzić	7
2020–21	1. HNLŽ	20	7	1	12	27	70	22	6th	QF	Marija Herceg	7
2021–22	1. HNLŽ	20	1	1	18	10	151	4	8th	R16	Ana Mandić	3

== See also ==
- NK Neretva
