= Tihana Nemčić =

Croatian football manager and former footballer

Tihana Nemčić Bojić (born 20 February 1988) is a Croatian football manager and former player who last managed ŽNK Rijeka.

== Early life ==
Nemčić started playing football at the age of 13.

== Career ==
While studying at the University of Zagreb, she played for the university's football team and served as the team captain.

After graduating from university, Nemčić played for Croatian side ŽNK Dinamo-Maksimir, where she was regarded as one of the club's most important players. She has been regarded as one of the most prominent Croatian women's futsal players.

Nemčić has written a book about futsal.

== Personal life ==
Nemčić obtained a doctorate.
