= Lea Zdunić =

Croatian footballer

Personal information
- Date of birth: 10 December 1998 (age 27)
- Position: Defender

Team information
- Current team: Dinamo Zagreb
- Number: 16

Senior career*
| Years | Team | Apps | (Gls) |
- Dinamo Zagreb

International career^{‡}
| 2015–2016 | Croatia U19 | 6 | (0) |
| 2020– | Croatia | 1 | (0) |
- * Club domestic league appearances and goals ‡ National team caps and goals as of 8 March 2020

Lea Zdunić (born 10 December 1998) is a Croatian footballer who plays as a defender for Prva HNLŽ club ŽNK Dinamo Zagreb and the Croatia women's national team.

== Honours ==
Dinamo Zagreb

- Croatian Women's Football Cup: 2023–24;
