= 2020–21 Croatian Women's First Football League =

Prva HNLŽ
- Season: 2020–21
- Champions: Osijek
- Relegated: Marjan; Viktorija
- Champions League: Osijek
- Matches: 80
- Goals: 409 (5.11 per match)
- Top goalscorer: Lorena Balić (44)
- Biggest home win: Osijek 16–0 Viktorija
- Biggest away win: Viktorija 0–15 Osijek
- Highest scoring: Osijek 16–0 Viktorija
- All statistics correct as of 6 June 2021.

The 2020–21 Croatian Women's First Football League (Prva hrvatska nogometna liga za žene) was the thirtieth season of Croatian Women's First Football League, the national championship for women's association football teams in Croatia, since its establishment in 1992. The season started on 27 September 2020.

The league was contested by eight teams. First stage was played in a double round robin format, with each team playing every other team two times over 14 rounds. In a second stage teams were divided in two groups according to the table standings. ŽNK Split were the defending champions, having won their second title in 2019–20.

== Teams ==
Locations of teams in 2020–21 Croatian Women's First Football League

The following is a complete list of teams who have secured a place in the 2020–21 Croatian Women's First Football League.

Team	Location	Stadium(s)	Position in 2019–20
Agram	Zagreb	Stadion Buzin	4th
Dinamo Zagreb	Zagreb	Stadion Maksimir	3rd
Donat	Zadar	Stadion Stanovi	1st (2. HNLŽ North-South)
Marjan	Split		2nd (2. HNLŽ North-South)
Neretva	Metković	Stadion Iza Vage	5th
Osijek	Osijek	Mačkamama, Stadion Gradski vrt	2nd
Split	Split	Stadion Park Mladeži	1st
Viktorija	Slavonski Brod	Stadion Jelas	7th

== Regular season ==
=== League table ===
Pos	Team	Pld	W	D	L	GF	GA	GD	Pts	Qualification or relegation
1	Osijek	14	12	2	0	110	8	+102	38 (Note: Goal difference: Osijek +102, Split +69)	Qualification for the Championship play-offs
2	Split	14	12	2	0	75	6	+69	38	Qualification for the Championship play-offs
3	Dinamo Zagreb	14	9	0	5	36	15	+21	27	Qualification for the Championship play-offs
4	Agram	14	7	1	6	29	47	−18	22	Qualification for the Championship play-offs
5	Donat	14	6	0	8	18	34	−16	18	Qualification for the Relegation play-offs
6	Neretva	14	5	0	9	19	53	−34	15	Qualification for the Relegation play-offs
7	Marjan	14	1	2	11	7	49	−42	5	Qualification for the Relegation play-offs
8	Viktorija	14	0	1	13	3	85	−82	1	Qualification for the Relegation play-offs

Updated to match(es) played on 25 April 2021. Source: soccerway.com HNS.hr
Rules for classification: 1) Points; 2) Head-to-head points; 3) Head-to-head goal difference; 4) Head-to-head goals scored (at home if two teams tied); 5) Goal difference; 6) Goals scored; 7) Play-off
(Note: Criteria 2-4 and 7 is only used if deciding champion, teams to international competition or teams for relegation and in that case criteria 6 will not be used).

=== Results ===
Home \ Away	AGR	DIN	DON	MAR	NER	OSI	SPL	VIK
Agram	—	2–0	5–2	7–1	1–2	1–11	0–8	3–0
Dinamo Zagreb	1–0	—	3–0	4–0	3–0	2–4	0–4	9–0
Donat	1–2	0–2	—	2–1	2–0	0–3	0–7	2–0
Marjan	0–0	0–4	0–3	—	1–2	0–5	1–3	0–0
Neretva	1–4	1–5	0–3	3–0	—	0–10	0–6	7–0
Osijek	15–0	2–1	6–0	11–0	8–0	—	2–2	16–0
Split	5–1	2–0	5–0	4–0	8–0	2–2	—	8–0
Viktorija	0–3	0–2	0–3	1–3	2–3	0–15	0–11	—

Updated to match(es) played on 25 April 2021. Source: HNS.hr
Legend: Blue = home team win; Yellow = draw; Red = away team win.
For upcoming matches, an "a" indicates there is an article about the rivalry between the two participants.

== Play-offs ==
=== Championship play-offs ===
==== League table ====
Pos	Team	Pld	W	D	L	GF	GA	GD	Pts	Qualification or relegation
1	Osijek (C)	20	16	4	0	136	11	+125	52 (Note: Head-to-head away goals: Osijek 4, Split 2)	Qualification for the Champions League first round
2	Split	20	16	4	0	95	12	+83	52	
3	Dinamo Zagreb	20	10	1	9	44	30	+14	31	
4	Agram	20	7	2	11	33	81	−48	23	

Updated to match(es) played on 6 June 2021. Source: HNS.hr
Rules for classification: 1) Points; 2) Head-to-head points; 3) Head-to-head goal difference; 4) Head-to-head goals scored (at home if two teams tied); 5) Goal difference; 6) Goals scored; 7) Play-off
(Note: Criteria 2-4 and 7 is only used if deciding champion, teams to international competition or teams for relegation and in that case criteria 6 will not be used).
(C) Champions

==== Results ====
Home \ Away	AGR	DIN	OSI	SPL
Agram	—	1–4	0–9	2–5
Dinamo Zagreb	1–1	—	0–4	2–3
Osijek	8–0	3–1	—	0–0
Split	7–0	3–0	2–2	—

Updated to match(es) played on 6 June 2021. Source: HNS.hr
Legend: Blue = home team win; Yellow = draw; Red = away team win.
For upcoming matches, an "a" indicates there is an article about the rivalry between the two participants.

=== Relegation play-offs ===
==== League table ====
Pos	Team	Pld	W	D	L	GF	GA	GD	Pts	Qualification or relegation
5	Donat	20	11	1	8	49	38	+11	34	
6	Neretva	20	7	1	12	27	70	−43	22	
7	Marjan (R)	20	4	3	13	19	61	−42	15	Qualification to Relegation play-off
8	Viktorija (R)	20	0	2	18	7	107	−100	2	Relegation to 2. HNLŽ

Updated to match(es) played on 6 June 2021. Source: HNS.hr
Rules for classification: 1) Points; 2) Head-to-head points; 3) Head-to-head goal difference; 4) Head-to-head goals scored (at home if two teams tied); 5) Goal difference; 6) Goals scored; 7) Play-off
(Note: Criteria 2-4 and 7 is only used if deciding champion, teams to international competition or teams for relegation and in that case criteria 6 will not be used).
(R) Relegated

==== Results ====
Home \ Away	DON	MAR	NER	VIK
Donat	—	5–1	5–1	8–0
Marjan	1–1	—	4–0	3–2
Neretva	1–6	3–1	—	3–1
Viktorija	0–6	1–2	0–0	—

Updated to match(es) played on 6 June 2021. Source: HNS.hr
Legend: Blue = home team win; Yellow = draw; Red = away team win.
For upcoming matches, an "a" indicates there is an article about the rivalry between the two participants.

==== Relegation play-off ====
At the end of the season, seventh placed Marjan will contest a two-legged relegation play-off tie against NŠ Međimurje-Čakovec, the losing team of promotion play-off tie.

===== First leg =====
13 June 2021
18:00

NŠ Međimurje-Čakovec	2–0	Marjan
Požgaj; Terawaki	Report

Čakovec

===== Second leg =====
20 June 2021
18:00

Marjan	0–2	NŠ Međimurje-Čakovec
	Report	Terawaki 33'; Vizinger 66'

Split

NŠ Međimurje-Čakovec won 4–0 on aggregate.

== Top scorers ==
Updated to matches played on 6 June 2021.

Rank	Player	Club	Goals
1	(Croatia) Lorena Balić	Osijek	44
2	(Croatia) Izabela Lojna	Osijek	31
3	(Bosnia and Herzegovina) Aida Hadžić	Split	20
4	(Croatia) Ana Dujmović	Split	11
4	(Croatia) Karla Kurkutović	Agram	11
6	(Croatia) Matea Bošnjak	Split	10
7	(Croatia) Karla Jedvaj	Dinamo Zagreb	9
7	(Ukraine) Tamila Khimich	Split	9
7	(Croatia) Anela Lubina	Split (5), Osijek (4)	9
10	(Croatia) Petra Barbir	Donat	8
10	(Croatia) Sara Ivandić	Donat	8
10	(Bosnia and Herzegovina) Merjema Medić	Split (3), Osijek (5)	8
