= ŽNK Agram =

Football club in Zagreb, Croatia

- Full name: Ženski nogometni klub Agram
- Founded: 15 February 2000
- Chairman: Gordana Sobol
- Manager: Ivanka Perić
- League: 1. HNL W
- 2025–26: 2nd

ŽNK Agram is a Croatian women's association football club based in Zagreb. The club was founded in 2000 and it currently competes in the Croatian First Division.

== Honours ==
- Croatian First Division:
  - Winners (1): 2025
  - Runners-up (1): 2017
- Croatian Cup:
  - Winners (1): 2026
  - Runners-up (1): 2018

== Recent seasons ==
Season	Division	P	W	D	L	F	A	Pts	Pos	Cup	Player	Goals
Season	League									Cup	Top league scorer	
2008–09	1. HNLŽ	20	5	3	12	24	50	18	7th			
2009–10	1. HNLŽ	20	6	2	12	13	59	20	6th			
2010–11	1. HNLŽ	20	9	3	8	31	39	30	6th			
2011–12	1. HNLŽ	19	9	1	9	31	41	28	3rd			
2012–13	1. HNLŽ	18	9	2	7	58	55	29	3rd			
2013–14	1. HNLŽ	21	5	3	13	41	88	18	6th	SF	Iva Bukač	13
2014–15	1. HNLŽ	17	7	5	5	37	40	26	5th	R16		
2015–16	1. HNLŽ	18	10	1	7	43	38	31	4th	SF		
2016–17	1. HNLŽ	18	16	0	2	92	25	48	2nd	SF	Tomislava Matijević	31
2017–18	1. HNLŽ	18	12	1	5	89	35	37	3rd	RU	Melani Mihić	24
2018–19	1. HNLŽ	18	9	0	9	36	37	27	4th	QF	Tomislava Matijević	11
2019–20	1. HNLŽ	20	7	0	13	36	110	21	4th	QF	Melani Mihić	15
2020–21	1. HNLŽ	20	7	2	11	33	81	23	4th	SF	Karla Kurkutović	11
2021–22	1. HNLŽ	20	9	2	9	57	53	29	5th	QF	Sandra Žigić	15
2022–23	1. HNLŽ	20	9	1	10	45	45	28	4th	R16	Ana Dujmović	13
2023–24	1. HNLŽ	20	7	5	8	32	27	26	5th	SF		
2024–25	1. HNLŽ	26	22	1	3	111	29	67	1st	SF	Jasna Đoković	38
2025–26	1. HNLŽ	24	16	1	7	80	31	49	2nd	W	Jasna Đoković	27
