= ŽNK Dinamo Zagreb =

- Full name: Ženski nogometni klub Dinamo Zagreb
- Founded: 24 June 1937; 89 years ago (as ŽNK Maksimir); 2016 (as ŽNK Dinamo Zagreb)
- Ground: Stadion Maksimir (selected matches)
- Capacity: 25,000 (reduced)
- Chairman: Josipa Maslać Petričević
- Manager: Ivan Jurilj
- League: Prva HNLŽ
- 2025–26: 3rd
- Website: https://znkdinamo.hr/
Home colours	Away colours	Third colours

ŽNK Dinamo Zagreb is a Croatian professional women's association football club based in Zagreb, and is the women's section of GNK Dinamo Zagreb. The club was founded in 2016 as successor of ŽNK Dinamo-Maksimir and it currently competes in the Croatian Women's First Football League.

== Current squad ==
As of 19 November 2023

Note: Flags indicate national team as defined under FIFA eligibility rules; some limited exceptions apply. Players may hold more than one non-FIFA nationality.

No.	Pos.	Nation	Player
1	GK	CRO	Ana Filipović
5	DF	CRO	Laura Kopić
6	MF	CRO	Marija Žagar
7	FW	CRO	Nika Petarić
8	MF	CRO	Helena Spajić
10	FW	CRO	Patricia Crkvenčić
11	FW	CRO	Ivana Stanić
12	GK	CRO	Matea Tomkić

No.	Pos.	Nation	Player
13	MF	CRO	Martina Taritaš
15	MF	CRO	Laura Huzanić
16	DF	CRO	Lea Zdunić
17	MF	CRO	Ana Grdiša
19	MF	CRO	Petra Bračević
20	MF	CRO	Mara Stančić
22	DF	CRO	Ana Bartolović (Captain)

== Recent seasons ==
Season	Division	P	W	D	L	F	A	Pts	Pos	Cup	Player	Goals
Season	League									Cup	Top goalscorer	
2016–17	2. HNLŽ Center	8	7	0	1	32	3	21	1st	R16	Sara Skendrović	9
2017–18	2. HNLŽ North-West	15	14	0	1	131	6	42	1st	SF	Ivana Stanić	47
2018–19	1. HNLŽ	18	10	1	7	52	35	31	3rd	QF	Ivana Stanić	15
2019–20	1. HNLŽ	20	11	0	9	61	35	33	3rd	SF	Ivana Stanić	19
2020–21	1. HNLŽ	20	10	1	9	44	30	31	3rd	SF	Karla Jedvaj	9
2021–22	1. HNLŽ	20	15	0	5	75	20	45	3rd	SF	Karla Kurkutović	20
2022–23	1. HNLŽ	20	9	1	10	52	33	28	3rd	RU	Karla Jedvaj	8
2023–24	1. HNLŽ	20	7	4	9	30	27	25	4th	W	Jyoti Chouhan	8

== Notable players ==
The following ŽNK Dinamo Zagreb player(s) have been capped at full international level. Years in brackets indicate their spells at the club.

- (India) Soumya Guguloth (2022–2023)
- (India) Jyoti Chouhan (2022–2024)
- (India) M. K. Kashmina (2023–2024)
- (India) Kiran Pisda (2023–2024)
