= Helena Spajić =

Croatian footballer

Personal information
- Date of birth: 8 February 2000 (age 26)
- Place of birth: Pakrac, Croatia
- Position: Midfielder

Team information
- Current team: Dinamo Zagreb
- Number: 8

Senior career*
Years	Team	Apps	(Gls)
- Dinamo Zagreb

International career^{‡}
- Croatia
- * Club domestic league appearances and goals as of 19:28, 30 August 2019 (UTC) ‡ National team caps and goals as of 19:28, 30 August 2019 (UTC)

Helena Spajić (born 8 February 2000) is a Croatian professional footballer who plays as a midfielder for Prva HNLŽ club Dinamo Zagreb and the Croatia women's national team.

== Career ==
Spajić has been capped for the Croatia national team, appearing for the team during the 2019 FIFA Women's World Cup qualifying cycle.

== Honours ==
Dinamo Zagreb

- Croatian Women's Football Cup: 2023–24;
