= Lorena Balić =

Croatian women's football forward

Personal information
- Full name: Lorena Balić
- Date of birth: 28 February 1998 (age 28)
- Place of birth: Zagreb, Croatia
- Position: Forward

Team information
- Current team: Osijek
- Number: 9

Senior career*
Years	Team	Apps	(Gls)
2014-	Osijek	195	(314)

International career^{‡}
2013	Croatia U17	2	(2)
2016	Croatia U19	3	(1)
2021–	Croatia	1	(0)
- * Club domestic league appearances and goals as of 22 June 2025 ‡ National team caps and goals as of 11 February 2025

Lorena Balić (born 28 February 1998) is a Croatian football forward currently playing for Osijek in the Prva HNLŽ, and the Croatia national team. She is also the second leading goal scorer of the Prva HNLŽ with 305 goals, behind Izabela Lojna.

== Club career ==
Balić started her career in 2014 making her debut for Osijek in a 5–0 victory over ZNK Angram, however she failed to score. She played the majority of the 2014/15 season in Osijek’s youth set up scoring 18 goals in 5 ISTOK youth league matches.

Balić only came to life as an outstanding forward in the 2017-18 season when she broke the record for scoring the most goals in a Croatian league season, with 61 goals, beating previous holder of the record, Mateja Andrlić, by 18 goals. Balić also hold the record for the most goals in the Croatian league with 268 league goals.

== Career statistics ==
=== Club ===
Appearances and goals by club, season, and competition. Only official games are included in this table.(Update: 19 June 2025 - Hour 20:08)
Club	Season	Prva HNLŽ		Croatian Cup		Europe		Total	
Club	Season	Apps	Goals	Apps	Goals	Apps	Goals	Apps	Goals
Osijek	2013-14	4	3	0	0	0	0	4	3
Osijek	2014-15	8	11	1	2	5	2	14	15
Osijek	2015-16	12	15	3	1	0	0	15	16
Osijek	2016-17	16	8	1	1	0	0	17	9
Osijek	2017-18	18	61	2	2	3	3	23	66
Osijek	2018-19	17	24	4	9	3	3	24	36
Osijek	2019-20	20	42	1	3	0	0	21	45
Osijek	2020-21	19	44	4	11	0	0	23	55
Osijek	2021-22	20	33	4	10	4	1	28	44
Osijek	2022-23	20	33	2	2	0	0	22	35
Osijek	2023-24	20	28	4	7	2	2	26	37
Osijek	2024-25	21	12	3	5	4	1	28	18
Osijek	2025-26	7	7	0	0	0	0	7	7
Osijek	Total	202	321	29	53	21	12	252	386

== Honours ==
- Croatian First Division:
  - 2014 to 2018, 2021, 2023
- Croatian Cup:
  - 2015, 2016, 2017
