= ŽNK Split =

- Full name: Ženski nogometni klub Split
- Founded: 21 January 2009; 17 years ago
- Ground: Stadion Park Mladeži
- Chairman: Alen Moharić
- Manager: Božidar Miletić
- League: First Division
- 2025–26: 7th
- Website: http://znksplit.hr/

ŽNK Split is a Croatian professional women's association football club based in Split. The club was founded in 2009 and it currently competes in the Croatian First Division. The club is the successor of ŽNK 8. mart, the first women's football club in Split, which was founded in 1971.

Split won the 2018–19 Croatian Women's First Football League title on the final day of the season with a 3–3 draw against 22-time champion ŽNK Osijek. Split then made it a league and cup double with a 1–0 win over Osijek in the Cup final.

== Honours ==
- Croatian First Division:
  - Winners (3): 2019, 2020, 2022
  - Runners-up (6): 2014, 2015, 2016, 2018, 2021, 2023
- Croatian Cup:
  - Winners (5): 2018, 2019, 2021, 2022, 2023
  - Runners-up (2): 2014, 2016

== Recent seasons ==
Season	Division	P	W	D	L	F	A	Pts	Pos	Cup	Player	Goals
Season	League									Cup	Top goalscorer	
2010–11												
2011–12	1. HNLŽ	20	1	3	16	13	75	6	8th			
2012–13	2. HNLŽ									SF		
2013–14	1. HNLŽ	21	15	2	4	70	23	47	2nd	RU	Ana Marija Kalamiza	25
2014–15	1. HNLŽ	17	13	1	3	74	20	40	2nd	SF	Ana Marija Kalamiza	33
2015–16	1. HNLŽ	18	12	2	4	71	23	38	2nd	RU	Anela Lubina	17
2016–17	1. HNLŽ	18	14	0	4	74	32	42	3rd	QF	Anela Lubina	24
2017–18	1. HNLŽ	18	16	0	2	114	9	48	2nd	W	Monika Conjar	31
2018–19	1. HNLŽ	18	17	1	0	105	6	52	1st	W	Ana Dujmović	19
2019–20	1. HNLŽ	20	18	0	2	152	8	54	1st	QF	Anela Lubina	25
2020–21	1. HNLŽ	20	16	4	0	95	12	52	2nd	W	Aida Hadžić	20
2021–22	1. HNLŽ	20	16	2	2	117	10	50	1st	W	Aida Hadžić	24
2022–23	1. HNLŽ	20	16	1	3	97	16	49	2nd	W	Lara Ivanuša	17
2023–24	1. HNLŽ	20	9	1	10	38	40	28	3rd	QF	Jasna Đoković	16

== European record ==
Season	Competition	Round	Opponent	Home	Away	Agg
2019–20	UEFA Women's Champions League	QGS	(Ukraine) Zhytlobud-1 Kharkiv	2–3		3rd out of 4
2019–20	UEFA Women's Champions League	QGS	(Belarus) FC Minsk	1–2		3rd out of 4
2019–20	UEFA Women's Champions League	QGS	(Luxembourg) Bettembourg	7–2		3rd out of 4
2020–21	UEFA Women's Champions League	QR1	(Poland) Górnik Łęczna		1–4	1–4
2022–23	UEFA Women's Champions League	QR1^{*}	(Kazakhstan) BIIK Kazygurt	1–5		3rd out of 4
2022–23	UEFA Women's Champions League	QR1^{*}	(Georgia (country)) Lanchkhuti	2–0		3rd out of 4

== Current squad ==
As of 1 January 2025

Note: Flags indicate national team as defined under FIFA eligibility rules; some limited exceptions apply. Players may hold more than one non-FIFA nationality.

No.	Pos.	Nation	Player
4	DF	BIH	Andrea Grebenar
5	DF	CRO	Lucija Domazet
7	MF	MNE	Jasna Đoković
8	MF	CRO	Tea Krznarić
10	MF	BIH	Aida Hadžić
11	DF	CRO	Tea Pedić
14	MF	CRO	Karla Šabašov

No.	Pos.	Nation	Player
16	FW	CRO	Iva Bukač
18	DF	CRO	Esma Heganović
20	MF	CRO	Ivana Kirilenko
22	MF	CRO	Matea Bošnjak
23	GK	CRO	Anamarija Prljević
—	MF	CRO	Petra Pezelj
