= Ivana Kirilenko =

Croatian footballer (born 2000)

Personal information
- Date of birth: 21 June 2000 (age 26)
- Place of birth: Koprivnica, Croatia
- Position: Forward

Team information
- Current team: DUX Logroño

Senior career*
Years	Team	Apps	(Gls)
2016–2017	Podravske Sesvete	11	(13)
2017–2020	Koprivnica	27	(27)
2020–2022	Split	12	(2)
2021	→ Donat (loan)	9	(5)
2022	→ Pomurje (loan)	6	(2)
2022–2023	Donat	18	(11)
2023–	DUX Logroño		

International career^{‡}
2020–	Croatia	8	(0)
- * Club domestic league appearances and goals as of 25 October 2023 ‡ National team caps and goals as of 25 October 2023

Ivana Kirilenko (born 21 June 2000) is a Croatian footballer who plays as a forward for Spanish club DUX Logroño and the Croatia women's national team.

== Club career ==
In 2020, Kirilenko played for Split in the UEFA Women's Champions League.

== International career ==
Kirilenko was capped for Croatia at senior level during the UEFA Women's Euro 2022 qualifying.
