= ŽNK Viktorija Slavonski Brod =

ŽNK Viktorija
- Full name: Ženski nogometni klub Viktorija Slavonski Brod
- Founded: 1994
- Manager: Miroslav Buljan
- League: Second Division
- 2022–23: First Division, 8th
Home colours

ŽNK Viktorija Slavonski Brod is a Croatian women's association football club based in Slavonski Brod. The club was founded in 1994 and they currently compete in the Croatian Second Division.

== Honours ==
- Croatian First Division:
  - Runners-up (3): 2005, 2009, 2010
- Croatian Cup:
  - Runners-up (1): 2007

== Recent seasons ==
Season	Division	P	W	D	L	F	A	Pts	Pos	Cup	Player	Goals
Season	League									Cup	Top goalscorer	
2002–03	1. HNLŽ	14	2	3	9	13	39	9	6th			
2003–04	1. HNLŽ	14	5	1	8	28	27	16	4th	QF		
2004–05	1. HNLŽ	18	15	2	1	87	10	47	2nd	SF		
2005–06	1. HNLŽ	16	10	0	6	54	35	30	4th			
2006–07	1. HNLŽ	20	10	1	9	60	66	31	3rd	RU		
2007–08	1. HNLŽ	17	6	3	8	35	50	21	3rd			
2008–09	1. HNLŽ	20	13	2	5	47	30	41	2nd			
2009–10	1. HNLŽ	20	14	2	4	59	20	44	2nd	SF		
2010–11	1. HNLŽ	20	10	2	8	37	26	32	5th			
2011–12	1. HNLŽ	20	8	2	10	44	42	26	5th			
2012–13	1. HNLŽ	18	2	0	16	18	95	6	7th			
2013–14	2. HNLŽ East	9	7	1	1	40	15	22	1st	R16	Tomislava Matijević	9
2014–15	1. HNLŽ	17	2	3	12	17	73	9	9th		Anna Ravnjak	6
2015–16	1. HNLŽ	18	5	1	12	25	75	16	9th		Ivana Katunar	8
2016–17	1. HNLŽ	18	4	4	10	29	59	16	6th	R16	Lorena Balić, Ivana Katunar	8
2017–18	1. HNLŽ	18	4	3	11	23	94	15	8th	R16	Karla Kurkutović	10
2018–19	1. HNLŽ	18	6	3	9	23	54	21	6th	SF	Karla Kurkutović, Lea Zdunić	5
2019–20	1. HNLŽ	20	7	1	12	27	85	22	7th	QF	Karla Kurkutović	11
2020–21	1. HNLŽ	20	0	2	18	7	107	2	8th	R16	Martina Martinko, Martina Obradović	2
2021–22	2. HNLŽ B	14	10	2	2	49	19	32	2nd	QF	Gabrijela Puljašević	10
2022–23	1. HNLŽ	20	0	0	20	3	197	0	8th	PR	Lena Ostojić	2
