= ŽNK Hajduk =

- Full name: Ženski nogometni klub Hajduk Split
- Nickname: "Hajdučice" (Female Hajduks)
- Founded: 6 March 2003; 23 years ago (as ŽNK Marjan)
- Ground: Stadion Poljud (selected matches)
- Capacity: 33,987
- Manager: Damir Matulović
- League: Prva HNLŽ
- 2025–26: Prva HNLŽ, 1st (champions)
- Website: hajduk.hr/klub/znk-hajduk
| Home colours | Away colours |

Ženski nogometni klub Hajduk is a Croatian professional women's association football club based in Split and they currently compete in the Croatian Women's First Football League. The club was founded in 2003 as ŽNK Marjan, but on 25 August 2021 signed a cooperation agreement with HNK Hajduk Split and changed its name into ŽNK Hajduk Split. The agreement is signed on one year with possibility of extension on two additional years.

== Honours ==
- Croatian First Division:
  - Winners (1): 2025–26

== Recent seasons ==
| Season | Division | P | W | D | L | F | A | Pts | Pos | Cup | Player | Goals |
| Season | League | | | | | | | | | Cup | Top goalscorer | |
As ŽNK Marjan
| 2003–04 | 2. HNLŽ | 2 | 2 | 0 | 0 | 8 | 4 | 6 | 1st ↑ | | | |
| 2004–05 | 1. HNLŽ | 18 | 7 | 0 | 11 | 47 | 45 | 21 | 7th | | | |
| 2005–06 | 1. HNLŽ | 16 | 3 | 1 | 12 | 15 | 86 | 10 | 8th ↓ | | | |
| 2006–07 | 2. HNLŽ | | | | | | | | | | | |
| 2007–08 | 2. HNLŽ | 16 | 2 | 1 | 13 | 14 | 72 | 7 | 5th | | | |
| 2008–09 | 2. HNLŽ | | | | | | | | | | | |
| 2009–10 | 2. HNLŽ | 9 | 5 | 0 | 4 | 23 | 15 | 12 | 5th | SF | | |
| 2010–11 | 2. HNLŽ | | | | | | | | ↑ | | | |
| 2011–12 | 1. HNLŽ | 20 | 6 | 4 | 10 | 21 | 62 | 22 | 7th | | Elizabeta Balić | 5 |
| 2012–13 | 1. HNLŽ | 18 | 4 | 1 | 13 | 24 | 89 | 12 | 6th | | Elizabeta Balić | 8 |
| 2013–14 | 1. HNLŽ | 21 | 3 | 2 | 16 | 28 | 72 | 5 | 8th ↓ | QF | Ana Dujmović | 11 |
| 2014–15 | 2. HNLŽ South | 12 | 12 | 0 | 0 | 88 | 8 | 36 | 1st ↑ | QF | Petra Barbir | 23 |
| 2015–16 | 1. HNLŽ | 18 | 7 | 2 | 9 | 34 | 68 | 23 | 5th | QF | Ana Marija Kalamiza | 19 |
| 2016–17 | 1. HNLŽ | 18 | 4 | 0 | 14 | 26 | 92 | 12 | 9th | QF | Lucija Mudrinić | 7 |
| 2017–18 | 1. HNLŽ | 18 | 3 | 2 | 13 | 25 | 91 | 11 | 9th | R16 | Ivana Ćubić, Andrea Šimić | 8 |
| 2018–19 | 1. HNLŽ | 18 | 5 | 3 | 10 | 34 | 57 | 18 | 9th ↓ | QF | Elizabeta Balić | 8 |
| 2019–20 | 2. HNLŽ North-South | 7 | 5 | 1 | 1 | 51 | 8 | 16 | 2nd ↑ | R16 | Ivana Ćubić | 19 |
| 2020–21 | 1. HNLŽ | 20 | 4 | 3 | 13 | 19 | 61 | 15 | 9th ↓ | R16 | Gabrijela Dugandžić | 5 |
As ŽNK Hajduk
| 2021–22 | 2. HNLŽ A | 16 | 15 | 0 | 1 | 124 | 4 | 45 | 1st ↑ | R16 | Lana Rusković | 26 |
| 2022–23 | 1. HNLŽ | 20 | 12 | 3 | 5 | 70 | 22 | 39 | 5th | SF | Janja Čanjevac | 10 |
| 2023–24 | 1. HNLŽ | 20 | 13 | 4 | 3 | 55 | 20 | 43 | 2nd | QF | Andrea Grebenar | 22 |
| 2024–25 | 1. HNLŽ | 26 | 12 | 5 | 9 | 69 | 40 | 41 | 3rd | RU | Andrea Grebenar | 20 |
| 2025–26 | 1. HNLŽ | 24 | 18 | 3 | 3 | 69 | 17 | 57 | 1st | SF | Andrea Grebenar | 13 |

== European record ==
| Season | Competition | Round | Opposition | Home | Away | Agg. |
|---|---|---|---|---|---|---|
| 2026–27 | UEFA Women's; Champions League | 2QR | Austria Wien | —N/a | 2–3 | 2−3 |
| 2026–27 | UEFA Women's; Champions League | 2QR | (Slovenia) Mura | —N/a | 2–0 | 2–0 |
| 2026–27 | UEFA Women's; Europa Cup | 1QR | (Denmark) Fortuna Hjørring | 0–2 | 1–1 | 1−3 |

== Current squad ==
As of 30 July 2026

Note: Flags indicate national team as defined under FIFA eligibility rules; some limited exceptions apply. Players may hold more than one non-FIFA nationality.

| No. | Pos. | Nation | Player |
|---|---|---|---|
| 1 | GK | MNE | Ajša Kalač |
| 3 | DF | CRO | Antonia Dulčić |
| 6 | DF | BIH | Nina Brnić |
| 7 | DF | CRO | Anja Prskalo |
| 8 | MF | CRO | Laura Vlastelica |
| 9 | MF | CRO | Ana Bakalar (captain) |
| 10 | MF | CRO | Lana Kukavica |
| 11 | MF | CRO | Tea Pedić |
| 12 | GK | CRO | Paula Karmela Matković |
| 14 | MF | CRO | Luana Vanjak |
| 16 | FW | MNE | Nađa Doknić |
| 17 | FW | CRO | Janja Čanjevac |

| No. | Pos. | Nation | Player |
|---|---|---|---|
| 18 | MF | BIH | Branka Bagarić |
| 19 | FW | CRO | Gia Kalaš |
| 20 | DF | CRO | Barbara Živković |
| 21 | FW | CRO | Ivana Vlajčević |
| 22 | MF | CRO | Matea Bošnjak |
| 23 | FW | CRO | Ana Maria Marković |
| 24 | MF | CRO | Lana Kožul |
| 27 | DF | CRO | Iva Bukač |
| 30 | MF | CRO | Laura Perković |
| 31 | GK | CRO | Karla Jonjić |
| 99 | DF | CRO | Sara Herceg |
