= Leonarda Balog =

Croatian footballer

Personal information
- Full name: Leonarda Balog
- Date of birth: 5 February 1993 (age 33)
- Place of birth: Križevci, Croatia
- Height: 1.72 m (5 ft 8 in)
- Position: Defender

Team information
- Current team: SKN St. Pölten
- Number: 4

Senior career*
Years	Team	Apps	(Gls)
2005–2009	Plamen Križevci		
2009–2011	ŽNK Osijek		
2011–2012	Unia Racibórz		
2013	1. FFC Recklinghausen	3	(0)
2013–2016	Zagłębie Lubin		
2016–2017	FC Neunkirch		
2018–2019	Osijek		(19)
2019–	SKN St. Pölten		

International career^{‡}
2008–2009	Croatia U17	8	(1)
2009–2011	Croatia U19	10	(2)
2009–	Croatia	72	(1)
- * Club domestic league appearances and goals as of 22 November 2016 ‡ National team caps and goals as of 26 November 2024

Leonarda Balog (born 5 February 1993) is a Croatian footballer who plays as a defender for SKN St. Pölten in the Austrian ÖFB-Frauenliga.

== Career ==
Balog played for Plamen Križevci and ŽNK Osijek of the Croatian 1. HNLŽ from 2005 to 2011. While at ŽNK Osijek in 2010, she played her first Champions League match. In 2011, she then joined Unia Racibórz of the Polish Ekstraliga, had a brief spell at German 2. Bundesliga side 1. FFC Recklinghausen in 2013 before returning to Poland later that year to settle at Zagłębie Lubin.

In 2016, she moved to Swiss Nationalliga A side FC Neunkirch

She played for the Croatian national team in the 2011 World Cup qualifying.

Goals scored for the Croatian WNT in official competitions
Competition	Stage	Date	Location	Opponent	Goals	Result	Overall
2015 FIFA World Cup	Qualifiers	2014–05–08	Ptuj	Slovenia	1	3–0	1

== Honours ==
Unia Racibórz

- Ekstraliga: 2011–12
- Polish Cup: 2011–12
