= Izabela Lojna =

Croatian football midfielder (born 1992)

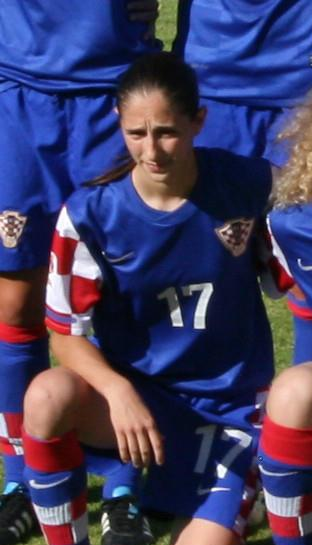
- Lojna in 2012

Personal information
- Date of birth: 11 May 1992 (age 34)
- Place of birth: Pula, Croatia
- Position: Midfielder

Team information
- Current team: Agram
- Number: 77

Senior career*
Years	Team	Apps	(Gls)
2011-2025	Osijek	226	(334)
2025-	Agram	11	(5)

International career^{‡}
2009–2011	Croatia U19	7	(0)
2010–	Croatia	102	(14)
- * Club domestic league appearances and goals as of 22 June 2025 ‡ National team caps and goals as of 7 March 2026

Izabela Lojna (born 11 May 1992) is a Croatian football midfielder currently playing in the Croatian First Division for Osijek, with which she has also played the Champions League. She is also the leading goal scorer of the Prva HNLŽ with 330 goals.

== Career statistics ==
=== Club ===
Appearances and goals by club, season, and competition. Only official games are included in this table.(Update: 22 June 2025 - Hour 23:00)
Club	Season	Prva HNLŽ		Croatian Cup		Europe		Total	
Club	Season	Apps	Goals	Apps	Goals	Apps	Goals	Apps	Goals
Osijek	2010-11	0	0	0	0	3	0	3	0
Osijek	2011-12	19	16	0	0	5	1	24	17
Osijek	2012-13	17	27	0	0	3	2	20	29
Osijek	2013-14	19	42	0	0	3	3	22	45
Osijek	2014-15	16	17	4	9	4	3	24	29
Osijek	2015-16	16	28	3	7	3	2	22	37
Osijek	2016-17	11	28	4	6	3	0	18	34
Osijek	2017-18	13	24	2	0	3	1	18	25
Osijek	2018-19	14	13	3	13	3	1	20	27
Osijek	2019-20	19	34	1	1	0	0	20	35
Osijek	2020-21	17	31	4	12	0	0	21	43
Osijek	2021-22	18	25	2	1	4	1	24	27
Osijek	2022-23	20	19	2	1	0	0	22	20
Osijek	2023-24	20	26	4	3	2	0	26	29
Osijek	2024-25	7	4	0	0	4	3	11	7
Total		226	334	29	53	40	17	295	404
Agram	2024-25	11	5	2	0	0	0	13	5
Total		11	5	2	0	0	0	13	5
Total		237	339	31	53	40	17	308	409

== International career ==
Lojna is a member of the Croatian national team; she debuted in May 2010 against Serbia.

=== International goals ===
#	Date	Venue	Opponent	Score	Result	Competition
1.	22 August 2010	Tallinn, Estonia	Estonia	1–1	1–1	2011 FIFA Women's World Cup qualification
2.	27 October 2011	Vrbovec, Croatia	Slovenia	3–3	3–3	UEFA Women's Euro 2013 qualifying
3.	7 March 2014	Umag, Croatia	Hungary	1–1	2–2	Istria Women's Cup
4.	19 June 2014	Senec, Slovakia	Slovakia	1–1	1–1	2015 FIFA Women's World Cup qualification
5.	13 September 2014	Zagreb, Croatia	Slovenia	1–0	1–0	2015 FIFA Women's World Cup qualification
6.	17 September 2014	Zagreb, Croatia	Russia	1–1	1–3	2015 FIFA Women's World Cup qualification
7.	19 June 2018	Viborg, Denmark	Denmark	1–0	1–1	2019 FIFA Women's World Cup qualification
8.	4 April 2019	Wuhan, China	Cameroon	1–1	1–2	2019 Wuhan International Tournament
9.	3 September 2019	Leuven, Belgium	Belgium	1–6	1–6	UEFA Women's Euro 2021 qualifying
10.	5 March 2020	Larnaca, Cyprus	Mexico	1–1	1–1	2020 Cyprus Women's Cup
11.	8 March 2020	Larnaca, Cyprus	Finland	2–2	3–2	2020 Cyprus Women's Cup
12.	31 May 2024	Zaprešić, Croatia	Ukraine	1–0	1–0	UEFA Women's Euro 2025 qualifying
13.	25 October 2024	Varaždin, Croatia	Northern Ireland	1–0	1–1	UEFA Women's Euro 2025 qualifying play-offs

== See also ==
- List of women's footballers with 100 or more international caps
