= Iva Bukač =

Croatian footballer

Personal information
- Date of birth: 27 November 1994 (age 31)
- Place of birth: Bjelovar, Croatia
- Position: Midfielder

Team information
- Current team: Hajduk
- Number: 27

International career^{‡}
Years	Team	Apps	(Gls)
- Croatia
- ‡ National team caps and goals as of 23:49, 31 August 2019 (UTC)

Iva Bukač (born 27 November 1994) is a Croatian footballer who plays as a midfielder and has appeared for the Croatia women's national team.

== Career ==
Bukač has been capped for the Croatia national team, appearing for the team during the UEFA Women's Euro 2021 qualifying cycle.
