= Croatian Women's Football Cup =

Hrvatski nogometni kup za žene
- Founded: 1992
- Region: Croatia
- Current champions: Agram
- Most championships: Osijek (20 titles)
- 2024–25

The Croatian Women's Cup is the national women's football cup competition in Croatia. It is run by the Croatian Football Federation. The competition was established in 1992, following the breakup of Yugoslavia and Croatia's independence. Before 1992 Croatian clubs took part in the Yugoslav Women's Football Cup which had been established in 1974.

Osijek is the most successful team, winning 20 out of 34 seasons. They are followed by Dinamo-Maksimir (6 wins), Split (5 wins), Zagreb (1 win), Dinamo Zagreb (1 win) and Agram (1 win).

== Winners ==
=== Key ===
	Two-legged tie
‡	Cup champions also won the Croatian Women's First Football League, i.e. they completed the domestic Double.

Season	Winner	Score	Runners–up
1992	Maksimir (1) ‡	6–2	Loto Zagreb
1992–93	Maksimir (2)		
1993–94	Zagreb (1)		
1994–95	Osijek (1) ‡		
1995–96	Osijek (2) ‡		
1996–97	Osijek (3) ‡		
1997–98	Osijek (4) ‡		
1998–99	Osijek (5) ‡		
1999–2000	Osijek (6) ‡		
2000–01	Osijek (7) ‡		
2001–02	Osijek (8) ‡		Podravke
2002–03	Maksimir (3)	4–3	Osijek
2003–04	Maksimir (4) ‡	12–4	Osijek
2004–05	Maksimir (5) ‡	13–0	Pregrada
2005–06	Maksimir (6) ‡	5–3	Osijek
2006–07	Osijek (9) ‡		Viktorija
2007–08	Osijek (10) ‡	7–1	Maksimir
2008–09	Osijek (11) ‡	6–2	Rijeka Jackpot
2009–10	Osijek (12) ‡	7–0	Rijeka Jackpot
2010–11	Osijek (13) ‡	5–0	Rijeka Jackpot
2011–12	Osijek (14) ‡	7–4	Maksimir
2012–13	Osijek (15) ‡	17–2	Maksimir
2013–14	Osijek (16) ‡	8–0	Split
2014–15	Osijek (17) ‡	10–0	Pregrada
2015–16	Osijek (18) ‡	5–0	Split
2016–17	Osijek (19) ‡	8–0	Trnava
2017–18	Split (1)	2–1	Agram
2018–19	Split (2) ‡	1–0	Osijek
2020	Suspended due to COVID-19 pandemic		
2020–21	Split (3)	0–0 (5–4 (p))	Osijek
2021–22	Split (4) ‡	1–0	Osijek
2022–23	Split (5)	3–2	Dinamo Zagreb
2023–24	Dinamo Zagreb (1)	1–1 (5–4 (p))	Osijek
2024–25	Osijek (20)	2–2 (5–4 (p))	Hajduk Split
2025–26	Agram (1)	2–0	Dinamo Zagreb
