= Mateja Andrlić =

Croatian footballer

Personal information
- Full name: Mateja Andrlić
- Date of birth: 25 December 1993 (age 32)
- Place of birth: Croatia
- Position: Forward

Team information
- Current team: ŽNK Osijek
- Number: 13

Senior career*
Years	Team	Apps	(Gls)
2010–	Osijek	167	(251)

International career^{‡}
2010–2011	Croatia U19	6	(0)
2014–	Croatia	6	(1)
- * Club domestic league appearances and goals as of 01:00, 7 March 2016 (UTC) ‡ National team caps and goals as of 01:00, 7 March 2016 (UTC)

Mateja Andrlić (born 25 December 1993) is a Croatian football forward who plays for ŽNK Osijek.

== Honours ==
ŽNK Osijek

Winner

- Croatian First League (5): 2010–11, 2011–12, 2012–13, 2013–14, 2014–15
