= List of Croatia women's international footballers =

This is a list of Croatia women's national football team players with at least 20 appearances. Iva Landeka has made the most appearances for the national team with 102. Maja Joščak and Ivana Rudelić are the top goalscorers in the history of the Croatian team, with 20 goals.

== Players ==
=== Players with at least 20 appearances ===
Appearances and goals are composed of FIFA Women's World Cup and UEFA Women's Championship and each competition's required qualification matches, as well as international friendlies. Players are listed by number of caps, then by goals scored. If they are still tied the players are listed alphabetically. Statistics correct as of 29 October 2024.

Key
§	Still active for the national team (Note: Players considered active are the ones who have been called up for the national team in the last 12 months.)
*	Still playing active football
GK	Goalkeeper
DF	Defender
MF	Midfielder
FW	Forward

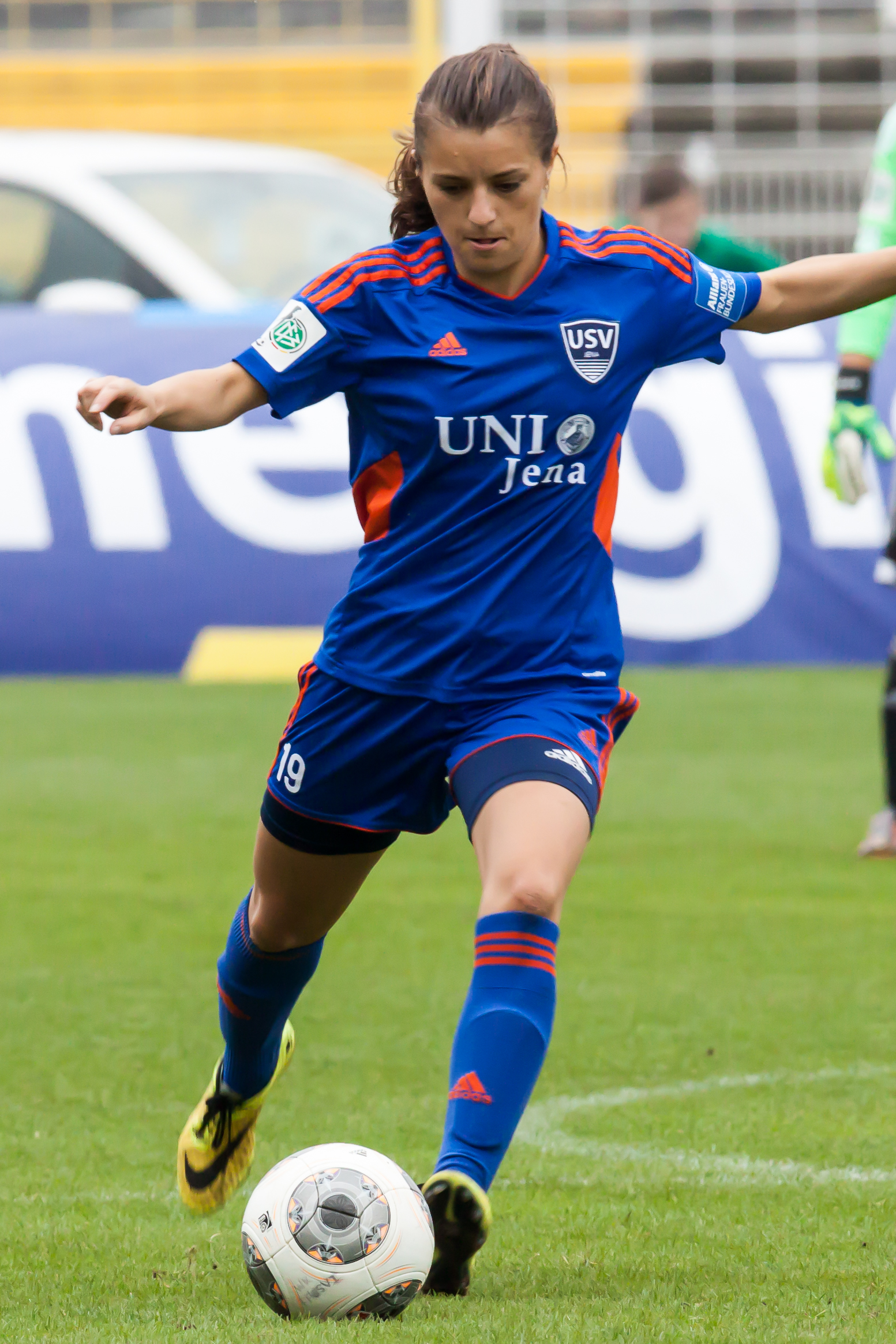
Former Croatia captain, Iva Landeka (102 caps, 14 goals) is the most-capped player.

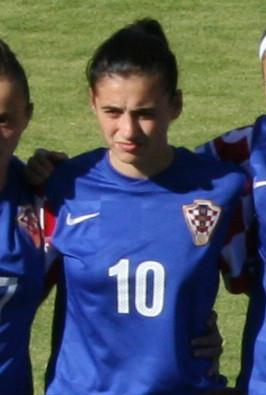
Maja Joščak is Croatia's all-time joint top scorer with 20 goals scored in an international career spanning 18 years between 2006 and 2024.

Croatia women's national team football players with at least 20 appearances
#	Name	Position	National team career	Caps	Goals	Ref
1	Iva Landeka *	MF	2006–2022	102	14	
2	Kristina Nevrkla^{§}	MF	2008–	97	4	
3	Sandra Žigić *	MF	2005–2019	94	10	
4	Izabela Lojna^{§}	MF	2010–	90	14	
5	Doris Bačić^{§}	GK	2011–	86	0	
6	Maja Joščak^{§}	FW	2006–	79	20	
7	Leonarda Balog^{§}	DF	2009–	72	1	
8	Kristina Šundov *	MF	2003–2020	59	8	
9	Violeta Baban	MF	2002–2016	58	8	
10	Ana Jelenčić^{§}	DF	2011–	57	1	
11	Ivana Rudelić^{§}	FW	2015–	53	20	
12	Petra Pezelj^{§}	MF	2015–	49	1	
13	Anela Lubina^{§}	MF	2015–	47	2	
14	Antonijela Horvat	DF	2001–2009	42	0	
15=	Katarina Kolar	FW	2006–2014	40	16	
15=	Martina Šalek	MF	2010–2019	40	5	
17=	Monika Conjar	FW	2012–2019	37	5	
17=	Renata Pirša	DF	1995–2007	37	1	
19=	Mihaela Horvat	DF	2015–2021	36	1	
19=	Antonia Dulčić^{§}	DF	2015–	36	0	
21	Marina Koljenik	FW	1994–2007	35	13	
22	Matea Bošnjak *	DF	2016–2022	33	2	
23=	Maria Kunštek^{§}	DF	2016–	33	0	
23=	Andreja Rogar	MF	1993–2005	32	0	
25	Branka Kozić	FW	1994–2005	30	7	
26	Tatjana Šolaja	DF	2000–2010	29	2	
27=	Marija Milas	DF	1993–2003	27	2	
27=	Ana Dujmović *	FW	2016–2021	27	0	
29	Helena Spajić^{§}	MF	2016–	26	0	
30=	Helenna Hercigonja-Moulton	DF	2011–2015	25	2	
30=	Mihaela Pavlek	DF	2004–2011	25	1	
32=	Antonija Vukičević	MF	2006–2012	24	5	
32=	Tanja Kovač	DF	1993–2003	24	4	
32=	Dušanka Juko	MF	2006–2012	24	3	
32=	Ivana Leskovac	MF	2003–2009	24	4	
32=	Nada Bešker	MF	1993–2002	24	2	
32=	Tea Krznarić^{§}	MF	2021–	24	0	
38	Vanesa Markuš	DF	2006–2013	23	0	
39=	Ljiljana Jakšić	FW	1995–2005	22	12	
39=	Mateja Andrlić *	FW	2014–2018	22	3	
41=	Snježana Fočić	DF	1993–2000	20	2	
41=	Ana Maria Marković^{§}	FW	2021–	20	2	
41=	Marija Matuzić	MF	1993–2000	20	2	
41=	Haira Đozo	GK	1994–2003	20	0	

== See also ==
- Croatia women's national football team results
- Croatia women's national football team#Current squad
