= Croatian Women's First Football League =

- Founded: 1992
- Country: Croatia
- Confederation: UEFA
- Number of clubs: 8
- Level on pyramid: 1
- Relegation to: Druga HNLŽ
- Domestic cup: Croatian Women's Cup
- International cup: UEFA Women's; Champions League
- Current champions: Hajduk Split (1 title) (2025–26)
- Most championships: Osijek (25 titles)
- Current: 2026–27 Prva HNLŽ

The Croatian Women's First Football League (Croatian: Prva hrvatska nogometna liga za žene, also known as Prva HNLŽ or 1. HNLŽ) is the top women's football league in Croatia. The league was formed in 1992 following the dissolution of the Yugoslav First Women's League, and it currently features 8 clubs. League winners qualify for the UEFA Women's Champions League.

== List of winners ==
Key

†	League champions also won the Croatian Women's Football Cup, i.e. they completed the domestic Double.

Season	Champions	Runners-up	Third Place	Top Scorer(s)	Goals
1992	Maksimir (1) †	Loto Zagreb	Osijek		
1993	Zagreb (1)	Osijek	Loto Zagreb		
1993–94	Osijek (1)	Zagreb	Maksimir		
1994–95	Osijek (2) †	Loto Zagreb	Maksimir		
1995–96	Osijek (3) †	Maksimir	Loto Zagreb		
1996–97	Osijek (4) †	Maksimir	Loto Zagreb		
1997–98	Osijek (5) †	Maksimir	Susedgrad		
1998–99	Osijek (6) †				
1999–2000	Osijek (7) †	Maksimir			
2000–01	Osijek (8) †	Maksimir			
2001–02	Osijek (9) †	Dinamo Tomašanci	Pregrada		
2002–03	Osijek (10)	Radnik '99	Maksimir		
2003–04	Maksimir (2) †	Osijek	Dalmacija		
2004–05	Maksimir (3) †	Viktorija	Osijek		
2005–06	Dinamo-Maksimir (4) †	Ombla	Osijek		
2006–07	Osijek (11) †	Dinamo-Maksimir	Viktorija		
2007–08	Osijek (12) †	Dinamo-Maksimir	Viktorija		
2008–09	Osijek (13) †	Viktorija	Dinamo-Maksimir		
2009–10	Osijek (14) †	Viktorija	Ombla		
2010–11	Osijek (15) †	Rijeka-Jack Pot	Dinamo-Maksimir		
2011–12	Osijek (16) †	Dinamo-Maksimir	Agram	Ana Marija Kalamiza (Osijek)	34
2012–13	Osijek (17) †	Rijeka-Jack Pot	Agram	Maja Joščak (Osijek)	39
2013–14	Osijek (18) †	Split	Rijeka-Jack Pot	Mateja Andrlić (Osijek)	43
2014–15	Osijek (19) †	Split	Dinamo-Maksimir	Ana Marija Kalamiza (Split)	33
2015–16	Osijek (20) †	Split	Trnava	Izabela Lojna (Osijek)	28
2016–17	Osijek (21) †	Agram	Split	Mateja Andrlić (Osijek)	39
2017–18	Osijek (22)	Split	Agram	Lorena Balić (Osijek)	61
2018–19	Split (1) †	Osijek	Dinamo Zagreb	Lorena Balić (Osijek)	24
2019–20	Split (2)	Osijek	Dinamo Zagreb	Lorena Balić (Osijek)	42
2020–21	Osijek (23)	Split	Dinamo Zagreb	Lorena Balić (Osijek)	44
2021–22	Split (3) †	Osijek	Dinamo Zagreb	Lorena Balić (Osijek)	33
2022–23	Osijek (24)	Split	Dinamo Zagreb	Lorena Balić (Osijek)	33
2023–24	Osijek (25)	Hajduk Split	Split	Lorena Balić (Osijek)	28
2024–25	Agram (1)	Osijek	Hajduk Split	Jasna Đoković (Agram)	38
2025–26	Hajduk Split (1)	Agram	Dinamo Zagreb	Jasna Đoković (Agram)	25

== Performance by club ==
Titles	Team
25	Osijek
4	Dinamo-Maksimir
3	Split
1	Zagreb
1	Agram
1	Hajduk Split
