= ŽNK Rijeka =

- Full name: Ženski nogometni klub Rijeka
- Founded: 1998; 27 years ago
- Ground: Kantrida
- Capacity: 10,600
- Chairman: Jelena Jurić
- Manager: Dušan Novković
- League: Croatian Women's First Football League
Home colours	Away colours

ŽNK Rijeka is a Croatian professional women's association football club based in Rijeka. It is the women's section of HNK Rijeka. They have competed in the Croatian Women's First Football League.

== History ==
The club was founded on 27 August 1998 by four sisters (Brankica Lukanić, Ružica Gregov, Hermina Trošelj, Ankica Kovačić) as ŽNK Jack Pot. The club participated in futsal competitions until 2007, when they formed a senior association football team and changed their name to Rijeka-Jack Pot. They competed in the Croatian Women's First Football League for seven consecutive seasons. In April 2015, due to financial issues, the club announced their withdrawal from the 2014–15 Croatian Women's First Football League. In May 2015, the name was changed to ŽNK Rijeka. From the 2015–16 season, the club has been affiliated with HNK Rijeka and has adopted its brand. In 2017, ŽNK Rijeka returned to the First Division.

== Managers ==
- (Croatia) Tihana Nemčić

== Recent seasons ==
Season	Division	P	W	D	L	F	A	Pts	Pos
2007–08	2. HNLŽ	16	13	1	2	56	14	40	1st ↑
2008–09	1. HNLŽ	20	6	2	12	39	54	20	4th
2009–10	1. HNLŽ	20	10	3	7	40	19	33	5th
2010–11	1. HNLŽ	20	11	0	9	41	27	33	2nd
2011–12	1. HNLŽ	20	7	3	10	24	44	24	4th
2012–13	1. HNLŽ	18	13	1	4	45	32	40	2nd
2013–14	1. HNLŽ	21	11	2	8	50	59	32	3rd
2014–15	1. HNLŽ	9	0	1	8	6	54	1	10th ↓
2015–16	2. HNLŽ North-West	15	12	0	3	73	15	36	2nd
2016–17	2. HNLŽ North-West	8	4	0	4	16	17	12	2nd ↑
2017–18	1. HNLŽ	18	8	5	5	54	69	29	4th
2018–19	1. HNLŽ	18	0	0	18	7	84	−3	10th ↓
2019–20	2. HNLŽ North-South	7	3	0	4	26	15	9	5th
2020–21	2. HNLŽ A	12	10	1	1	70	8	31	1st ↑
2021–22	1. HNLŽ	20	6	1	13	32	91	19	4th
