= Anela Lubina =

Croatian footballer (born 1995)

Personal information
- Date of birth: 18 December 1995 (age 30)
- Place of birth: Dubrovnik, Croatia
- Position: Midfielder

Team information
- Current team: Osijek
- Number: 20

Senior career*
Years	Team	Apps	(Gls)
2011–2012	Split	14	(1)
2012–2014	Dinamo-Maksimir	32	(18)
2014–2020	Split	114	(103)
2020–	Osijek	70	(25)

International career^{‡}
2015–	Croatia	29	(2)
- * Club domestic league appearances and goals as of 19:28, 30 August 2019 (UTC) ‡ National team caps and goals as of 19:28, 30 August 2019 (UTC)

Anela Lubina (born 18 December 1995) is a Croatian footballer who plays as a midfielder and has appeared for the Croatia women's national team.

== Career ==
Lubina has been capped for the Croatia national team, appearing for the team during the 2019 FIFA Women's World Cup qualifying cycle.

List of international goals scored by Anela Lubina
No.	Date	Venue	Cap	Opponent	Score	Result	Competition
1	8 November 2019	Stadion ŠRC Zaprešić, Zaprešić	17	Belgium	1–2	1–4	UEFA Women's Euro 2021 qualifying
2	30 November 2021	Stadion Aldo Drosina, Pula	29	Moldova	3–0	4–0	2023 FIFA Women's World Cup qualification
