= 2025 UEFA Women's Nations League B =

Tournament details
- Dates: League phase: 21 February – 3 June 2025; Promotion/relegation matches: 24–29 October 2025
- Teams: 16
- Promoted: Poland; Republic of Ireland; Serbia; Slovenia; Ukraine
- Relegated: Belarus; Bosnia and Herzegovina; Croatia; Greece; Hungary; Romania

Tournament statistics
- Matches played: 48
- Goals scored: 117 (2.44 per match)
- Attendance: 105,745 (2,203 per match)
- Top scorer(s): (Albania) Fortesa Berisha (Czech Republic) Kateřina Svitková (Slovenia) Zara Kramžar (5 goals each)
- Women's European Qualifiers Women's Nations League

League B was the second division of the 2025 UEFA Women's Nations League, the second season of the international football competition involving the women's national teams of the member associations of UEFA. The results were also used to determine the leagues for the European qualifying competition for the 2027 FIFA Women's World Cup.

== Format ==
League B consisted of the teams ranked 17th to 32nd, according to the Women’s European Qualifiers overall phase rankings (based on the Women's Euro 2025 qualifying overall ranking, taking into consideration promotion/relegation at the conclusion of that competition), split into four groups of four. Each team played six matches within their group, using the home-and-away round-robin format with double matchdays in February, April, and May/June 2025.

The competition also acted as the first phase of the qualifying competition for the 2027 FIFA Women's World Cup, which used an identical league structure. The four group winners were promoted to League A, and the four last-placed teams, along with the two worst-ranked third-placed teams, were relegated to League C for the 2027 Women's World Cup qualifying competition. In addition, the four runners-up and two best-ranked third-placed teams advanced to the promotion/relegation play-offs:

- The four runners-up of League B advanced to the promotion play-offs against the four third-placed teams of League A. The winners of the home-and-away ties entered League A for the 2027 Women's World Cup qualifying competition, while the losers entered League B.
- The two best-ranked third-placed teams of League B advanced to the relegation play-offs against the two best-ranked runners-up of League C. The winners of the home-and-away ties entered League B for the 2027 Women's World Cup qualifying competition, while the losers entered League C.

== Seeding ==
Teams were allocated to League A according to the Women’s European Qualifiers overall phase rankings, and were seeded into four pots of four teams based on the same ranking.

The draw for the league phase took place at the UEFA headquarters in Nyon, Switzerland on 7 November 2024 at 13:00 CET. For political reasons, Belarus and Ukraine could not be drawn in the same group.

Pot 1
Team	Rank
Finland	17
Czech Republic	18
Republic of Ireland	19
Poland	20

Pot 2
Team	Rank
Serbia	21
Ukraine	22
Northern Ireland	23
Turkey	24

Pot 3
Team	Rank
Croatia	25
Hungary	26
Bosnia and Herzegovina	27
Slovenia	28

Pot 4
Team	Rank
Romania	29
Belarus	30
Greece	31
Albania	32

== Groups ==
Times are CET/CEST, (Note: CET (UTC+1) for times up to 29 March 2025. CEST (UTC+2) for times from 30 March 2025.) as listed by UEFA (local times, if different, are in parentheses).

=== Group 1 ===
Pos	Team	Pld	W	D	L	GF	GA	GD	Pts	Promotion, qualification or relegation	(Poland)	(Northern Ireland)	(Bosnia and Herzegovina)	(Romania)
1	Poland (P)	6	5	1	0	16	2	+14	16	Promotion to League A	—	2–0	5–1	3–0
2	Northern Ireland	6	2	2	2	6	10	−4	8	Qualification for promotion play-offs	0–4	—	3–2	1–0
3	Bosnia and Herzegovina (R)	6	1	2	3	9	12	−3	5	Relegation to League C	1–1	1–1	—	4–0
4	Romania (R)	6	1	1	4	3	10	−7	4	Relegation to League C	0–1	1–1	2–0	—

Source: UEFA
Rules for classification: Tiebreakers
(P) Promoted; (R) Relegated
21 February
13:00

Bosnia and Herzegovina	4–0	Romania
Olar 38' (o.g.); Milinković 48'; Gačanica 79'; Krajšumović 86'	Report

Bosnia and Herzegovina FA Training Centre, Zenica
Attendance: 98
Referee: Catarina Campos (Portugal)
21 February
20:45

Poland	2–0	Northern Ireland
Kamczyk 17'; Achcińska 20'	Report

Gdańsk Stadium, Gdańsk
Attendance: 2,700
Referee: Emanuela Rusta (Albania)

25 February
20:00 (19:00 GMT)

Northern Ireland	3–2	Bosnia and Herzegovina
McPartlan 15'; Magill 89', 90+2'	Report	Ekić 46'; Milinković 49'

Inver Park, Larne
Attendance: 1,303
Referee: Caroline Lanssens (Belgium)
25 February
17:00 (18:00 EEST)

Romania	0–1	Poland
	Report	Padilla 84'

Stadionul Arcul de Triumf, Bucharest
Attendance: 490
Referee: Fabienne Michel (Germany)

4 April
18:00

Poland	5–1	Bosnia and Herzegovina
Pajor 15', 47'; Achcińska 49'; Słowińska 77'; Wiankowska 89' (pen.)	Report	Krajšumović 40'

Gdańsk Stadium, Gdańsk
Attendance: 5,027
Referee: Katalin Sipos (Hungary)
4 April
18:00 (19:00 EEST)

Romania	1–1	Northern Ireland
Ciolacu 38'	Report	Maxwell 33'

Stadionul Arcul de Triumf, Bucharest
Attendance: 1,485
Referee: Sandra Bastos (Portugal)

8 April
18:00

Bosnia and Herzegovina	1–1	Poland
Krajšumović 65'	Report	Zawistowska 90+1'

Bosnia and Herzegovina FA Training Centre, Zenica
Attendance: 120
Referee: Deborah Bianchi (Italy)
8 April
18:00

Northern Ireland	1–0	Romania
Weir 8'	Report

Windsor Park, Belfast
Attendance: 2,380
Referee: Shona Shukrula (Netherlands)

30 May
20:00

Northern Ireland	0–4	Poland
	Report	Pajor 5', 9'; Tomasiak 28'; Achcińska 47'

Seaview, Belfast
Attendance: 2,482
Referee: Minka Vekkeli (Finland)
30 May
17:00

Romania	2–0	Bosnia and Herzegovina
Olar 45+3'; Carp 60'	Report

Central Stadium, Ovidiu
Attendance: 1,365
Referee: Olivia Tschon (Austria)

3 June
19:00

Bosnia and Herzegovina	1–1	Northern Ireland
Krajšumović 29'	Report	Magill 23'

Bosnia and Herzegovina FA Training Centre, Zenica
Attendance: 300
Referee: Hristiyana Guteva (Bulgaria)
3 June
19:00

Poland	3–0	Romania
Kamczyk 45'; Tomasiak 82', 90' (pen.)	Report

Gdańsk Stadium, Gdańsk
Attendance: 10,685
Referee: Aleksandra Česen (Slovenia)

=== Group 2 ===
Pos	Team	Pld	W	D	L	GF	GA	GD	Pts	Promotion, qualification or relegation	(Slovenia)	(Republic of Ireland)	(Turkey)	(Greece)
1	Slovenia (P)	6	5	0	1	12	2	+10	15 (Note: Head-to-head goal difference: Slovenia +3, Republic of Ireland –3.)	Promotion to League A	—	4–0	3–0	2–0
2	Republic of Ireland (O, P)	6	5	0	1	10	6	+4	15	Qualification for promotion play-offs	1–0	—	1–0	2–1
3	Turkey (O)	6	2	0	4	3	7	−4	6	Qualification for relegation play-offs	0–1	1–2	—	1–0
4	Greece (R)	6	0	0	6	2	12	−10	0	Relegation to League C	1–2	0–4	0–1	—

Source: UEFA
Rules for classification: Tiebreakers
(O) Play-off winners; (P) Promoted; (R) Relegated
Notes:
21 February
15:30 (16:30 EEST)

Greece	1–2	Slovenia
Sarri 26'	Report	Sternad 33'; Kramžar 67'

Theodoros Vardinogiannis, Heraklion
Attendance: 350
Referee: Nanna Løf Andersen (Denmark)
21 February
20:30 (19:30 GMT)

Republic of Ireland	1–0	Turkey
Carusa 45+3'	Report

Tallaght Stadium, Dublin
Attendance: 8,071
Referee: Réka Molnar (Hungary)

25 February
18:00

Slovenia	4–0	Republic of Ireland
Prašnikar 3', 28'; Kramžar 34'; Kajzba 82'	Report

Bonifika Stadium, Koper
Attendance: 533
Referee: Michalina Diakow (Poland)
25 February
16:30 (18:30 TRT)

Turkey	1–0	Greece
Keskin 33'	Report

Esenler Stadium, Istanbul
Attendance: 2,728
Referee: Miriama Bočková (Slovakia)

4 April
16:00 (17:00 EEST)

Greece	0–4	Republic of Ireland
	Report	Sheva 49'; Carusa 61'; Stapleton 74'; Barrett 90+3'

Theodoros Vardinogiannis, Heraklion
Attendance: 550
Referee: Jelena Pejković (Croatia)
4 April
16:30

Slovenia	3–0	Turkey
Kolbl 29'; Kramžar 36'; Prašnikar 65' (pen.)	Report

Šiška Sports Park, Ljubljana
Attendance: 950
Referee: Victoria Beyer (France)

8 April
20:30 (19:30 IST)

Republic of Ireland	2–1	Greece
Barrett 9' (pen.); Patten 50'	Report	Sarri 72'

Tallaght Stadium, Dublin
Attendance: 5,879
Referee: Franziska Wildfeuer (Germany)
8 April
17:00 (18:00 TRT)

Turkey	0–1	Slovenia
	Report	Kramžar 62'

New Sivas 4 Eylül Stadium, Sivas
Attendance: 18,825
Referee: Fabienne Michel (Germany)

30 May
18:00

Slovenia	2–0	Greece
Kramžar 24'; Prašnikar 50'	Report

Šiška Sports Park, Ljubljana
Attendance: 738
Referee: Réka Molnar (Hungary)
30 May
19:00 (20:00 TRT)

Turkey	1–2	Republic of Ireland
Hançar 49'	Report	Şeker 80' (o.g.); Murphy 89'

Esenler Stadium, Istanbul
Attendance: 760
Referee: Kristina Georgieva (Bulgaria)

3 June
19:00

Greece	0–1	Turkey
	Report	Hançar 42'

Theodoros Vardinogiannis Stadium, Heraklion
Attendance: 1,170
Referee: Maïka Vanderstichel (France)
3 June
19:00 (18:00 IST)

Republic of Ireland	1–0	Slovenia
Noonan 19'	Report

Páirc Uí Chaoimh, Cork
Attendance: 9,433
Referee: Miriama Bočková (Slovakia)

=== Group 3 ===
Pos	Team	Pld	W	D	L	GF	GA	GD	Pts	Promotion, qualification or relegation	(Serbia)	(Finland)	(Hungary)	(Belarus)
1	Serbia (P)	6	4	2	0	7	1	+6	14	Promotion to League A	—	1–0	1–0	0–0
2	Finland	6	3	2	1	8	2	+6	11	Qualification for promotion play-offs	1–1	—	3–0	0–0
3	Hungary (R)	6	1	1	4	2	6	−4	4	Relegation to League C	0–1	0–1	—	0–0
4	Belarus (R)	6	0	3	3	0	8	−8	3	Relegation to League C	0–3	0–3	0–2	—

Source: UEFA
Rules for classification: Tiebreakers
(P) Promoted; (R) Relegated
21 February
20:00

Belarus	0–2	Hungary
	Report	Csiki 57'; Csányi 78'

Lagator Stadium, Loznica (Serbia) (Note: Due to the Belarusian involvement in the Russian invasion of Ukraine, Belarus were required to play their home matches at neutral venues, and behind closed doors, until further notice.)
Attendance: 0
Referee: Sandra Bastos (Portugal)
21 February
18:00

Serbia	1–0	Finland
Damnjanović 43' (pen.)	Report

Serbian FA Sports Center, Stara Pazova
Attendance: 280
Referee: Michaela Pachtova (Czech Republic)

25 February
18:00

Hungary	0–1	Finland
	Report	Nyström 7' (pen.)

Hidegkuti Nándor Stadion, Budapest
Attendance: 1,213
Referee: Hristiyana Guteva (Bulgaria)
25 February
18:00

Serbia	0–0	Belarus
	Report

Serbian FA Sports Center, Stara Pazova
Attendance: 215
Referee: Olivia Tschon (Austria)

4 April
17:00

Finland	0–0	Belarus
	Report

Stadio Silvio Piola, Novara (Italy) (Note: Due to the Belarusian involvement in the Russian invasion of Ukraine Finland did not host Belarus. The match was played at neutral venue behind closed doors.)
Attendance: 0
Referee: Emanuela Rusta (Albania)
4 April
20:00

Hungary	0–1	Serbia
	Report	Matejić 69'

Ménfői úti Stadion, Győr
Attendance: 513
Referee: Caroline Lanssens (Belgium)

8 April
21:00

Belarus	0–3	Serbia
	Report	Matejić 24', 90+1'; Ivanović 75'

Stadio Silvio Piola, Novara (Italy)
Attendance: 0
Referee: Henrikke Nervik (Germany)
8 April
17:30

Finland	3–0	Hungary
Koivisto 18'; Sällström 39'; Franssi 88'	Report

Tammelan Stadion, Tampere
Attendance: 4,135
Referee: Angelika Söder (Germany)

30 May
20:00

Belarus	0–3	Finland
	Report	Franssi 8'; Sällström 66', 73'

Szent Gellért Fórum, Szeged (Hungary)
Attendance: 0
Referee: Merima Čelik (Bosnia and Herzegovina)
30 May
19:00

Serbia	1–0	Hungary
Poljak 90+6'	Report

Serbian FA Sports Center, Stara Pazova
Attendance: 300
Referee: Kirsty Dowle (England)

3 June
19:00

Finland	1–1	Serbia
Lehtola 71'	Report	Roth 84' (o.g.)

Olympic Stadium, Helsinki
Attendance: 8,970
Referee: Sandra Bastos (Portugal)
3 June
19:00

Hungary	0–0	Belarus
	Report

Szent Gellért Fórum, Szeged
Attendance: 1,613
Referee: Ana Maria Terteleac (Romania)

=== Group 4 ===
Pos	Team	Pld	W	D	L	GF	GA	GD	Pts	Promotion, qualification or relegation	(Ukraine)	(Czech Republic)	(Albania)	(Croatia)
1	Ukraine (P)	6	4	1	1	8	6	+2	13 (Note: Head-to-head points: Ukraine 4, Czech Republic 1.)	Promotion to League A	—	1–0	2–1	2–1
2	Czech Republic	6	4	1	1	17	4	+13	13	Qualification for promotion play-offs	1–1	—	5–1	5–0
3	Albania (O)	6	2	0	4	10	12	−2	6	Qualification for relegation play-offs	1–2	1–2	—	4–0
4	Croatia (R)	6	1	0	5	4	17	−13	3	Relegation to League C	2–0	0–4	1–2	—

Source: UEFA
Rules for classification: Tiebreakers
(O) Play-off winners; (P) Promoted; (R) Relegated
Notes:
21 February
18:00

Albania	1–2	Ukraine
Berisha 90+5'	Report	Ovdiychuk 31'; Kozlova 48'

Niko Dovana Stadium, Durrës
Attendance: 2,520
Referee: Franziska Wildfeuer (Germany)
21 February
19:00

Croatia	0–4	Czech Republic
	Report	Stašková 15'; Khýrová 18'; Krejčiříková 29'; Svitková 63'

Stadion Aldo Drosina, Pula
Attendance: 327
Referee: Abigail Byrne (England)

25 February
17:30

Czech Republic	5–1	Albania
Svitková 34', 42'; Bartoňová 45+2', 62'; Stašková 60'	Report	Doçi 24' (pen.)

Střelecký ostrov, České Budějovice
Attendance: 2,025
Referee: Kristina Georgieva (Bulgaria)
25 February
18:00

Ukraine	2–1	Croatia
Kotyk 2'; Kalinina 61'	Report	Nevrkla 69'

Elbasan Arena, Elbasan (Albania) (Note: Due to the Russian invasion of Ukraine, Ukraine were required to play their home matches at neutral venues.)
Attendance: 10
Referee: Shona Shukrula (Netherlands)

4 April
16:00

Albania	4–0	Croatia
Berisha 14'; Hila 24'; Doçi 72'; Hamonikaj 90+1'	Report

Loro Boriçi Stadium, Shkodër
Attendance: 436
Referee: Alexandra Collin (France)
4 April
18:00

Ukraine	1–0	Czech Republic
Ovdiychuk 57'	Report

Stadion Miejski, Polkowice (Poland)
Attendance: 500
Referee: Ainara Acevedo (Spain)

8 April
16:00

Croatia	1–2	Albania
Slipčević 11'	Report	Berisha 32'; Balog 71' (o.g.)

Sport Centre Rudes, Zagreb
Attendance: 377
Referee: Maria Marotta (Italy)
8 April
17:30

Czech Republic	1–1	Ukraine
Svitková 4'	Report	Petryk 19' (pen.)

Městský stadion, Ústí nad Labem
Attendance: 2,184
Referee: Minka Vekkeli (Finland)

30 May
17:00

Czech Republic	5–0	Croatia
Khýrová 6'; Svitková 18'; Pochmanová 23'; Dubcová 47'; Polášková 53'	Report

Letní stadion, Chomutov
Attendance: 934
Referee: Karoline Wacker (Germany)
30 May
19:00

Ukraine	2–1	Albania
Ovdiychuk 19'; Basanska 41'	Report	Berisha 10'

Stadion Varteks, Varaždin (Croatia)
Attendance: 50
Referee: Caroline Lanssens (Belgium)

3 June
19:00

Albania	1–2	Czech Republic
Berisha 45+2'	Report	Bartoňová 87' (pen.); Khýrová 90'

Loro Boriçi Stadium, Shkodër
Attendance: 483
Referee: Michalina Diakow (Poland)
3 June
19:00

Croatia	2–0	Ukraine
Vračević 11'; Živković 52'	Report

Stadion Branko Čavlović-Čavlek, Karlovac
Attendance: 238
Referee: Deborah Anex (Switzerland)

== Ranking of third-placed teams ==
Pos	Grp	Team	Pld	W	D	L	GF	GA	GD	Pts	Qualification or relegation
1	B4	Albania	6	2	0	4	10	12	−2	6	Qualification for relegation play-offs
2	B2	Turkey	6	2	0	4	3	7	−4	6	Qualification for relegation play-offs
3	B1	Bosnia and Herzegovina	6	1	2	3	9	12	−3	5	Relegation to League C
4	B3	Hungary	6	1	1	4	2	6	−4	4	Relegation to League C

Source: UEFA
Rules for classification: Tiebreakers

== League ranking ==
The 16 League B teams are ranked 17th to 32nd overall in the 2025 Women's Nations League, according to the criteria for league ranking.

Rnk	Grp	Team	Pld	W	D	L	GF	GA	GD	Pts	PRST
17	B1	Poland	6	5	1	0	16	2	+14	16	Promotion to League A
18	B2	Slovenia	6	5	0	1	12	2	+10	15	Promotion to League A
19	B3	Serbia	6	4	2	0	7	1	+6	14	Promotion to League A
20	B4	Ukraine	6	4	1	1	8	6	+2	13	Promotion to League A
21	B2	Republic of Ireland	6	5	0	1	10	6	+4	15	Promotion playoff for League A
22	B4	Czech Republic	6	4	1	1	17	4	+13	13	Promotion playoff for League A
23	B3	Finland	6	3	2	1	8	2	+6	11	Promotion playoff for League A
24	B1	Northern Ireland	6	2	2	2	6	10	−4	8	Promotion playoff for League A
25	B4	Albania	6	2	0	4	10	12	−2	6	Relegation playoff for League C
26	B2	Turkey	6	2	0	4	3	7	−4	6	Relegation playoff for League C
27	B1	Bosnia and Herzegovina	6	1	2	3	9	12	−3	5	Relegation to League C
28	B3	Hungary	6	1	1	4	2	6	−4	4	Relegation to League C
29	B1	Romania	6	1	1	4	3	10	−7	4	Relegation to League C
30	B3	Belarus	6	0	3	3	0	8	−8	3	Relegation to League C
31	B4	Croatia	6	1	0	5	4	17	−13	3	Relegation to League C
32	B2	Greece	6	0	0	6	2	12	−10	0	Relegation to League C

Source: UEFA
Rules for classification: Ranking criteria

== Goalscorers ==
There were 117 goals scored in 48 matches, for an average of 2.44 goals per match.

5 goals

- (Albania women's national football team) Fortesa Berisha
- (Czech Republic women's national football team) Kateřina Svitková
- (Slovenia women's national football team) Zara Kramžar

4 goals

- (Bosnia and Herzegovina women's national football team) Sofija Krajšumović
- (Poland women's national football team) Ewa Pajor
- (Slovenia women's national football team) Lara Prašnikar

3 goals

- (Czech Republic women's national football team) Eva Bartoňová
- (Czech Republic women's national football team) Michaela Khýrová
- (Finland women's national football team) Linda Sällström
- (Northern Ireland women's national football team) Simone Magill
- (Poland women's national football team) Adriana Achcińska
- (Poland women's national football team) Paulina Tomasiak
- (Serbia women's national football team) Nina Matejić
- (Ukraine women's national football team) Olha Ovdiychuk

2 goals

- (Albania women's national football team) Megi Doçi
- (Bosnia and Herzegovina women's national football team) Marija Milinković
- (Czech Republic women's national football team) Andrea Stašková
- (Finland women's national football team) Sanni Franssi
- (Greece women's national football team) Veatriki Sarri
- (Poland women's national football team) Ewelina Kamczyk
- (Republic of Ireland women's national football team) Amber Barrett
- (Republic of Ireland women's national football team) Kyra Carusa
- (Turkey women's national football team) Kader Hançar

1 goal

- (Albania women's national football team) Klea Hamonikaj
- (Albania women's national football team) Alma Hilaj
- (Bosnia and Herzegovina women's national football team) Emina Ekic
- (Bosnia and Herzegovina women's national football team) Minela Gačanica
- (Croatia women's national football team) Kristina Nevrkla
- (Croatia women's national football team) Ivana Slipčević
- (Croatia women's national football team) Tea Vračević
- (Croatia women's national football team) Barbara Živković
- (Czech Republic women's national football team) Kamila Dubcová
- (Czech Republic women's national football team) Tereza Krejčiříková
- (Czech Republic women's national football team) Aneta Pochmanová
- (Czech Republic women's national football team) Aneta Polášková
- (Finland women's national football team) Emma Koivisto
- (Finland women's national football team) Nea Lehtola
- (Finland women's national football team) Eva Nyström
- (Hungary women's national football team) Diána Csányi
- (Hungary women's national football team) Anna Csiki
- (Northern Ireland women's national football team) Danielle Maxwell
- (Northern Ireland women's national football team) Brenna McPartlan
- (Northern Ireland women's national football team) Kascie Weir
- (Poland women's national football team) Natalia Padilla
- (Poland women's national football team) Klaudia Słowińska
- (Poland women's national football team) Martyna Wiankowska
- (Poland women's national football team) Weronika Zawistowska
- (Republic of Ireland women's national football team) Emily Murphy
- (Republic of Ireland women's national football team) Saoirse Noonan
- (Republic of Ireland women's national football team) Anna Patten
- (Republic of Ireland women's national football team) Marissa Sheva
- (Republic of Ireland women's national football team) Jessie Stapleton
- (Romania women's national football team) Cristina Carp
- (Romania women's national football team) Mihaela Ciolacu
- (Romania women's national football team) Florentina Olar
- (Serbia women's national football team) Jovana Damnjanović
- (Serbia women's national football team) Miljana Ivanović
- (Serbia women's national football team) Allegra Poljak
- (Slovenia women's national football team) Nina Kajzba
- (Slovenia women's national football team) Špela Kolbl
- (Slovenia women's national football team) Maja Sternad
- (Turkey women's national football team) Elif Keskin
- (Ukraine women's national football team) Olha Basanska
- (Ukraine women's national football team) Yana Kalinina
- (Ukraine women's national football team) Yana Kotyk
- (Ukraine women's national football team) Nicole Kozlova
- (Ukraine women's national football team) Anna Petryk

1 own goal

- (Croatia women's national football team) Leonarda Balog (against Albania)
- (Finland women's national football team) Maaria Roth (against Serbia)
- (Romania women's national football team) Florentina Spânu (against Bosnia and Herzegovina)
- (Turkey women's national football team) Busem Şeker (against Republic of Ireland)
