= Clément Turpin =

French football referee (born 1982)

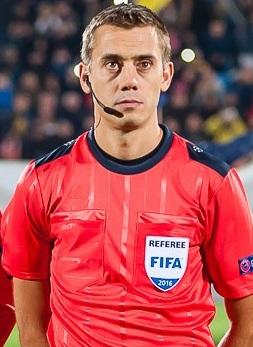
- Turpin in 2016
- Born: 16 May 1982 (age 44); Oullins, France
- Height: 1.76 m (5 ft 9 in)

Domestic
Years	League	Role
2006–2007	National	Referee
2007–2009	Ligue 2	Referee
2008–present	Ligue 1	Referee

International
Years	League	Role
2010–present	FIFA listed	Referee

Clément Turpin (French pronunciation: [klemɑ̃ tyʁpɛ̃]; born 16 May 1982) is a French football referee. He has been a FIFA listed referee since 2010, and an UEFA Elite group referee since 2012.

== Career ==
Turpin became a FIFA referee in 2010. He has served as a referee in the 2014 and 2018 World Cup qualifiers.

Turpin became a referee in UEFA club competitions from the 2010–11 UEFA Europa League.

In May 2016, Turpin was named the best French referee by the French Football Federation. The same year he officiated at the UEFA Euro 2016 in France and was one of the five UEFA referees for the Men's Olympic Games football tournament in Brazil.

The following year Turpin refereed in the 2017 FIFA U-17 World Cup in India.

On 29 March 2018, FIFA announced that Turpin would officiate at the 2018 FIFA World Cup in Russia, with Cyril Gringore and Nicolas Danos as assistant referees.

On 4 July 2020, he officiated the Oldest capital derby of Bulgaria between Levski Sofia and Slavia Sofia.

On 26 May 2021, he refereed the 2021 UEFA Europa League Final between Villarreal and Manchester United.

Turpin was selected by UEFA to officiate the 2022 UEFA Champions League Final between Liverpool and Real Madrid.

In April 2024, Turpin was selected to officiate at UEFA Euro 2024 in Germany. The following year, Turpin was selected to officiate at the 2026 FIFA World Cup in North America.

== Record ==
=== Major national team competitions ===
UEFA Euro 2016 – France
Date	Match	Venue	Location	Round	Result	Yellow cards	Red cards
14 June 2016	Austria – Hungary	Nouveau Stade de Bordeaux	Bordeaux	Group stage	0–2	1	1
21 June 2016	Northern Ireland – Germany	Parc des Princes	Paris	Group stage	0–1	0	0
2018 FIFA World Cup – Russia
20 June 2018	Uruguay – Saudi Arabia	Rostov Arena	Rostov-on-Don	Group stage	1–0	0	0
27 June 2018	Switzerland – Costa Rica	Nizhny Novgorod Stadium	Nizhny Novgorod	Group stage	2–2	6	0
UEFA Euro 2020 – Europe
12 June 2021	Wales – Switzerland	Baku National Stadium	Baku	Group stage	1–1	3	0
21 June 2021	Russia – Denmark	Parken Stadium	Copenhagen	Group stage	1–4	3	0
2022 FIFA World Cup – Qatar
24 November 2022	Uruguay – South Korea	Education City Stadium	Al Rayyan	Group stage	0–0	3	0
29 November 2022	Ecuador – Senegal	Khalifa International Stadium	Al Rayyan	Group stage	1–2	1	0
5 December 2022	Brazil – South Korea	Stadium 974	Doha	Round of 16	4–1	1	0
UEFA Euro 2024 – Germany
14 June 2024	Germany – Scotland	Allianz Arena	Munich	Group stage	5–1	3	1
25 June 2024	England – Slovenia	RheinEnergieStadion	Cologne	Group stage	0–0	5	0
6 July 2024	Netherlands – Turkey	Olympiastadion	Berlin	Quarter Finals	2–1	6	1
2026 FIFA World Cup – Canada/United States/Mexico
17 June 2026	England – Croatia	AT&T Stadium	Arlington	Group stage	4–2	0	0
25 June 2026	Paraguay – Australia	Levi's Stadium	Santa Clara	Group stage	0–0	2	0
3 July 2026	Colombia – Ghana	Arrowhead Stadium	Kansas City	Round of 32	1–0	5	0
11 July 2026	Norway – England	Hard Rock Stadium	Miami Gardens	Quarter Finals	1–2	1	0

=== Major club competitions ===
Date	Competition	Match	Venue	Location	Round	Result	Yellow cards	Red cards
26 May 2021	UEFA Europa League	Villarreal – Manchester United	Stadion Gdańsk	Gdańsk	Final	1–1 (11–10 on penalties)	4	0
28 May 2022	UEFA Champions League	Liverpool – Real Madrid	Stade de France	Saint-Denis	Final	0–1	1	0

== Honours ==
- IFFHS World's Best Referee: 2025

== See also ==
- List of FIFA international referees

Sporting positions (France) Clément Turpin
Preceded by (Spain) Antonio Mateu Lahoz	UEFA Champions League Final Referee; 2022	Succeeded by (Poland) Szymon Marciniak
Preceded by (Netherlands) Danny Makkelie	UEFA Europa League Final Referee; 2021	Succeeded by (Slovenia) Slavko Vinčić
