= Villarreal CF in European football =

Spanish club in European football

- Club: Villarreal CF
- Seasons played: 22
- First entry: 2002 UEFA Intertoto Cup
- Latest entry: 2026–27 UEFA Champions League

Titles
- Europa League: 1: 2021
- Intertoto Cup: 2: 2003; 2004

Villarreal CF, a Spanish football club, has played in European football since 2002, in the Intertoto Cup, UEFA Cup, Champions League, Europa League, Europa Conference League and UEFA Super Cup. The club won their first Europa League title in 2021.

== History ==
=== 2005–06 UEFA Champions League ===
The 2005–06 season brought the club considerable European success and recognition, due to their consistent performances in the Champions League. In the qualifying round stage, Villarreal controversially defeated English side Everton with a 4–2 aggregate score with two 2–1 victories. In the group stage, Villarreal were to be in the same group as Portuguese champions Benfica, French club Lille, and England's Manchester United. Remaining undefeated throughout the group stage, Villarreal were twice victorious (1–0 each against Benfica away and Lille at home) and earned four draws, including two scoreless draws with Manchester United. They topped their group and progressed to the knock-out stages along with Benfica. The club progressed to the quarter-finals in their Champions League debut by defeating the Scottish club Rangers 3–3 on the away goals rule (a 2–2 draw in Glasgow and a 1–1 draw at home gave the Spanish side one more away goal than their opponents).

El Submarino Amarillo drew Italian giants Inter Milan in the quarter-finals of the Champions League. The first leg was played at the San Siro on 29 March 2006, where Villarreal's Diego Forlán scored inside the first minute of the match, but Villarreal lost 2–1 as Inter took a lead to the return leg at El Madrigal on 4 April. Villarreal, however, continued their unbeaten home record in the Champions League after winning the second leg 1–0 to qualify for the semi-finals on the away goals rule (the tie ended 2–2 on aggregate, but because of Forlán's goal in Milan, Villarreal advanced). During that game, left-back Rodolfo Arruabarrena turned a back header from Juan Román Riquelme free kick past Inter goalkeeper Francesco Toldo to score the decisive goal of the tie. In the semi-finals, Villarreal narrowly lost out to Arsenal on a 1–0 aggregate scoreline following Arsenal goalkeeper Jens Lehmann's save of Riquelme's last-minute penalty.

=== 2008–09 Champions League ===
The club automatically qualified for the 2008–09 Champions League after finishing second in La Liga the previous season. They drew Manchester United, for the second consecutive campaign; Celtic; and AaB. They made a good start by holding current European champions United to a goal-less draw at Old Trafford, a third 0–0 draw in a row against the English giants. A first win was sealed on 30 September by beating Gordon Strachan's Celtic 1–0 at El Madrigal, courtesy of a Marcos Senna free-kick. On 21 October, during a Champions League match against AaB, they won 6–3. The Spaniards went through to the knock-out stage after drawing 2–2 with AaB in Denmark and drawing goalless once again against Manchester United, though they lost to an already eliminated Celtic in the last group stage match.

In the knock-out stage, they faced Panathinaikos, who left Villarreal with a 1–1 away advantage, despite this the Greeks were to lose 1–2 in Athens. Villarreal reached the quarter-finals for the second time in two tries, and were once again paired with Arsenal. The first leg saw a 1–1 draw by a free-kick by Marcos Senna, equalised by an Emmanuel Adebayor volley. Theo Walcott, Emmanuel Adebayor and Robin van Persie secured a 3–0 win for Arsenal on the return, knocking Villarreal out of the tournament.

=== 2009–10 Europa League ===
For the 2009–10 season, Villarreal competed in the Europa League, defeating NAC Breda of the Netherlands by a 2–9 aggregate victory in a qualifier. They shared Group G with Levski Sofia, who they defeated 1–0 in the opening game, and with Lazio and Red Bull Salzburg. They came second in that group, behind Red Bull. Consequently, Villarreal was drawn against VfL Wolfsburg (who had dropped out of the Champions League) in the round of 32. Playing at home first, Villarreal secured a 2–2 draw, but in the return leg at Wolfsburg's Volkswagen Arena, Villarreal would succumb to defeat by a 4–1 scoreline.

=== 2010–11 Europa League ===
Despite finishing outside of a European qualifying spot in the domestic league, Villarreal was given a place in the qualifying round of the Europa League after UEFA determined that Mallorca's financial irregularities precluded them from taking part in the tournament.

A 5–0 home win and a 2–1 away win against Dnepr Mogilev qualified them for the group stage. Villarreal suffered an early setback following a shock 2–0 loss in their away fixture against Dinamo Zagreb. Despite this, however, wins against Dinamo, Club Brugge and PAOK saw them top their group.

After beating Napoli, Bayer Leverkusen and Twente in the knockout phases, Villarreal qualified for the semi-finals to face tournament favourites Porto. After taking a 1–0 lead at the Estádio do Dragão, Porto made a remarkable turnaround that ended in a 5–1 defeat for Villarreal. Although Villarreal won the second leg with a 3–2 win, Porto's first leg goals saw them advance to the final to eventually defeat Braga, finishing as champions. Giuseppe Rossi finished as the tournament's second top goalscorer with eleven goals, behind Porto's Radamel Falcao.

=== Beginning of the 2020s: The European Fairytale ===
Having missed Europe during the 2019–20 season after finishing 14th in La Liga, Villarreal played their first European match of the decade on 22 October 2020, beating Sivasspor 5–3 at home in the Europa League. They would finish first in their group, ahead of Qarabağ, Maccabi Tel Aviv and Sivasspor, before knocking out Red Bull Salzburg 4–1 on aggregate, Dynamo Kyiv 4–0 on aggregate, Dinamo Zagreb 3–1 on aggregate and Arsenal 2–1 on aggregate. On 26 May 2021, Villarreal beat Manchester United 11–10 on penalties after a 1–1 draw in the final, winning not only their first major trophy but also their first European trophy (excluding the UEFA Intertoto Cup). This win granted Villarreal a place in the 2021–22 UEFA Champions League group stage and to the 2021 UEFA Super Cup, which they lost to Chelsea 6–5 on penalties after a 1–1 draw.

On 14 September 2021, Villarreal played their first UEFA Champions League match in the group stage since 2011, a 2–2 draw to Atalanta. With three wins, one draw and two defeats, they managed to finish second of their group and qualify to the round of 16. In the knockout phase, Villarreal played Juventus in the round of 16, and knocked them out after drawing 1–1 at home before winning 3–0 away. Villarreal then played Bayern Munich in the quarter-finals, and knocked them out as well after winning 1–0 at home and drawing 1–1 away, reaching their best record in the competition, the semi-finals, as they did in the 2005–06 season. Unfortunately for Villarreal, their fairytale ended at this stage of the competition, by losing 5–2 on aggregate to Liverpool.

== Overall record ==
Accurate as of 20 October 2026

| Competition | Pld | W | D | L | GF | GA | GD | W% |
|---|---|---|---|---|---|---|---|---|
| UEFA Champions League | 57 | 15 | 16 | 26 | 64 | 82 | −18 | 26.32 |
| UEFA Cup / UEFA Europa League | 134 | 77 | 31 | 26 | 237 | 137 | +100 | 57.46 |
| UEFA Europa Conference League | 10 | 6 | 2 | 2 | 21 | 13 | +8 | 60.00 |
| UEFA Intertoto Cup | 24 | 12 | 8 | 4 | 32 | 16 | +16 | 50.00 |
| UEFA Super Cup | 1 | 0 | 1 | 0 | 1 | 1 | +0 | 0.00 |
| Total | 226 | 110 | 58 | 58 | 355 | 249 | +106 | 48.67 |

Legend: GF = Goals For. GA = Goals Against. GD = Goal Difference.

== Matches ==
| Season | Competition | Round | Opponent | Home | Away | Aggregate |
|---|---|---|---|---|---|---|
| 2002 | UEFA Intertoto Cup | 2R | (Iceland) FH | 2–0 | 2–2 | 4–2 |
| 2002 | UEFA Intertoto Cup | 3R | (Italy) Torino | 2–0 (a.e.t.) | 0–2 | 2–2 (4–3 p) |
| 2002 | UEFA Intertoto Cup | Semi-finals | (France) Troyes | 0–0 | 2–0 | 3–0 |
| 2002 | UEFA Intertoto Cup | Final | (Spain) Málaga | 0–1 | 1–1 | 1–2 |
| 2003–04 | UEFA Intertoto Cup | 3R | (Italy) Brescia | 2–0 | 1–1 | 3–1 |
| 2003–04 | UEFA Intertoto Cup | Semi-finals | (Czech Republic) Brno | 2–0 | 1–1 | 3–1 |
| 2003–04 | UEFA Intertoto Cup | Final | (Netherlands) Heerenveen | 0–0 | 2–1 | 2–1 |
| 2003–04 | UEFA Cup | 1R | (Turkey) Trabzonspor | 0–0 | 3–2 | 3–2 |
| 2003–04 | UEFA Cup | 2R | (Russia) Torpedo Moscow | 2–0 | 0–1 | 2–1 |
| 2003–04 | UEFA Cup | 3R | (Turkey) Galatasaray | 3–0 | 2–2 | 5–2 |
| 2003–04 | UEFA Cup | 4R | (Italy) Roma | 2–0 | 1–2 | 3–2 |
| 2003–04 | UEFA Cup | Quarter-finals | (Scotland) Celtic | 2–0 | 1–1 | 3–1 |
| 2003–04 | UEFA Cup | Semi-finals | (Spain) Valencia | 0–0 | 0–1 | 0–1 |
| 2004–05 | UEFA Intertoto Cup | 2R | (Denmark) Odense | 2–0 | 3–0 | 5–0 |
| 2004–05 | UEFA Intertoto Cup | 3R | (Russia) Spartak Moscow | 1–0 | 2–2 | 3–2 |
| 2004–05 | UEFA Intertoto Cup | Semi-finals | (Germany) Hamburger SV | 1–0 | 1–0 | 2–0 |
| 2004–05 | UEFA Intertoto Cup | Final | (Spain) Atlético Madrid | 2–0 | 0–2 (a.e.t.) | 2–2 (3–1 p) |
| 2004–05 | UEFA Cup | 1R | (Sweden) Hammarby | 3–0 | 2–1 | 5–1 |
| 2004–05 | UEFA Cup | Group E | (Italy) Lazio | —N/a | 1–1 | 2nd |
| 2004–05 | UEFA Cup | Group E | (England) Middlesbrough | 2–0 | —N/a | 2nd |
| 2004–05 | UEFA Cup | Group E | (Serbia and Montenegro) Partizan | —N/a | 1–1 | 2nd |
| 2004–05 | UEFA Cup | Group E | (Greece) Egaleo | 4–0 | —N/a | 2nd |
| 2004–05 | UEFA Cup | Round of 32 | (Ukraine) Dynamo Kyiv | 2–0 | 0–0 | 2–0 |
| 2004–05 | UEFA Cup | Round of 16 | (Romania) Steaua București | 2–0 | 0–0 | 2–0 |
| 2004–05 | UEFA Cup | Quarter-finals | (Netherlands) AZ | 1–2 | 1–1 | 2–3 |
| 2005–06 | UEFA Champions League | 3Q | (England) Everton | 2–1 | 2–1 | 4–2 |
| 2005–06 | UEFA Champions League | Group D | (Portugal) Benfica | 1–1 | 1–0 | 1st |
| 2005–06 | UEFA Champions League | Group D | (France) Lille | 1–0 | 0–0 | 1st |
| 2005–06 | UEFA Champions League | Group D | (England) Manchester United | 0–0 | 0–0 | 1st |
| 2005–06 | UEFA Champions League | Round of 16 | (Scotland) Rangers | 1–1 | 2–2 | 3–3 (a) |
| 2005–06 | UEFA Champions League | Quarter-finals | (Italy) Internazionale | 1–0 | 1–2 | 2–2 (a) |
| 2005–06 | UEFA Champions League | Semi-finals | (England) Arsenal | 0–0 | 0–1 | 0–1 |
| 2006 | UEFA Intertoto Cup | 3R | (Slovenia) Maribor | 1–2 | 1–1 | 2–3 |
| 2007–08 | UEFA Cup | 1R | (Belarus) BATE Borisov | 4–1 | 2–0 | 6–1 |
| 2007–08 | UEFA Cup | Group C | (Italy) Fiorentina | 1–1 | —N/a | 1st |
| 2007–08 | UEFA Cup | Group C | (Greece) AEK Athens | —N/a | 2–1 | 1st |
| 2007–08 | UEFA Cup | Group C | (Czech Republic) Mladá Boleslav | —N/a | 2–1 | 1st |
| 2007–08 | UEFA Cup | Group C | (Sweden) Elfsborg | 2–0 | —N/a | 1st |
| 2007–08 | UEFA Cup | Round of 32 | (Russia) Zenit Saint Petersburg | 2–1 | 0–1 | 2–2 (a) |
| 2008–09 | UEFA Champions League | Group E | (England) Manchester United | 0–0 | 0–0 | 2nd |
| 2008–09 | UEFA Champions League | Group E | (Denmark) AaB | 6–3 | 2–2 | 2nd |
| 2008–09 | UEFA Champions League | Group E | (Scotland) Celtic | 1–0 | 0–2 | 2nd |
| 2008–09 | UEFA Champions League | Round of 16 | (Greece) Panathinaikos | 1–1 | 2–1 | 3–2 |
| 2008–09 | UEFA Champions League | Quarter-finals | (England) Arsenal | 1–1 | 0–3 | 1–4 |
| 2009–10 | UEFA Europa League | PO | (Netherlands) NAC Breda | 6–1 | 3–1 | 9–2 |
| 2009–10 | UEFA Europa League | Group G | (Austria) Red Bull Salzburg | 0–1 | 0–2 | 2nd |
| 2009–10 | UEFA Europa League | Group G | (Italy) Lazio | 4–1 | 1–2 | 2nd |
| 2009–10 | UEFA Europa League | Group G | (Bulgaria) Levski Sofia | 1–0 | 2–0 | 2nd |
| 2009–10 | UEFA Europa League | Round of 32 | (Germany) VfL Wolfsburg | 2–2 | 1–4 | 3–6 |
| 2010–11 | UEFA Europa League | PO | (Belarus) Dnepr Mogilev | 5–0 | 2–1 | 7–1 |
| 2010–11 | UEFA Europa League | Group D | (Greece) PAOK | 1–0 | 0–1 | 1st |
| 2010–11 | UEFA Europa League | Group D | (Croatia) Dinamo Zagreb | 3–0 | 0–2 | 1st |
| 2010–11 | UEFA Europa League | Group D | (Belgium) Club Brugge | 2–1 | 2–1 | 1st |
| 2010–11 | UEFA Europa League | Round of 32 | (Italy) Napoli | 2–1 | 0–0 | 2–1 |
| 2010–11 | UEFA Europa League | Round of 16 | (Germany) Bayer Leverkusen | 2–1 | 3–2 | 5–3 |
| 2010–11 | UEFA Europa League | Quarter-finals | (Netherlands) Twente | 5–1 | 3–1 | 8–2 |
| 2010–11 | UEFA Europa League | Semi-finals | (Portugal) Porto | 3–2 | 1–5 | 4–7 |
| 2011–12 | UEFA Champions League | PO | (Denmark) Odense | 3–0 | 0–1 | 3–1 |
| 2011–12 | UEFA Champions League | Group A | (Germany) Bayern Munich | 0–2 | 1–3 | 4th |
| 2011–12 | UEFA Champions League | Group A | (Italy) Napoli | 0–2 | 0–2 | 4th |
| 2011–12 | UEFA Champions League | Group A | (England) Manchester City | 0–3 | 1–2 | 4th |
| 2014–15 | UEFA Europa League | PO | (Kazakhstan) Astana | 4–0 | 3–0 | 7–0 |
| 2014–15 | UEFA Europa League | Group A | (Germany) Borussia Mönchengladbach | 2–2 | 1–1 | 2nd |
| 2014–15 | UEFA Europa League | Group A | (Switzerland) Zürich | 4–1 | 2–3 | 2nd |
| 2014–15 | UEFA Europa League | Group A | (Cyprus) Apollon Limassol | 4–0 | 2–0 | 2nd |
| 2014–15 | UEFA Europa League | Round of 32 | (Austria) Red Bull Salzburg | 2–1 | 3–1 | 5–2 |
| 2014–15 | UEFA Europa League | Round of 16 | (Spain) Sevilla | 1–3 | 1–2 | 2–5 |
| 2015–16 | UEFA Europa League | Group E | (Czech Republic) Viktoria Plzeň | 1–0 | 3–3 | 2nd |
| 2015–16 | UEFA Europa League | Group E | (Austria) Rapid Wien | 1–0 | 1–2 | 2nd |
| 2015–16 | UEFA Europa League | Group E | (Belarus) Dinamo Minsk | 4–0 | 2–1 | 2nd |
| 2015–16 | UEFA Europa League | Round of 32 | (Italy) Napoli | 1–0 | 1–1 | 2–1 |
| 2015–16 | UEFA Europa League | Round of 16 | (Germany) Bayer Leverkusen | 2–0 | 0–0 | 2–0 |
| 2015–16 | UEFA Europa League | Quarter-finals | (Czech Republic) Sparta Prague | 2–1 | 4–2 | 6–3 |
| 2015–16 | UEFA Europa League | Semi-finals | (England) Liverpool | 1–0 | 0–3 | 1–3 |
| 2016–17 | UEFA Champions League | PO | (France) Monaco | 1–2 | 0–1 | 1–3 |
| 2016–17 | UEFA Europa League | Group L | (Switzerland) Zürich | 2–1 | 1–1 | 2nd |
| 2016–17 | UEFA Europa League | Group L | (Romania) Steaua București | 2–1 | 1–1 | 2nd |
| 2016–17 | UEFA Europa League | Group L | (Turkey) Osmanlıspor | 1–2 | 2–2 | 2nd |
| 2016–17 | UEFA Europa League | Round of 32 | (Italy) Roma | 0–4 | 1–0 | 1–4 |
| 2017–18 | UEFA Europa League | Group A | (Czech Republic) Slavia Prague | 2–2 | 2–0 | 1st |
| 2017–18 | UEFA Europa League | Group A | (Israel) Maccabi Tel Aviv | 0–1 | 0–0 | 1st |
| 2017–18 | UEFA Europa League | Group A | (Kazakhstan) Astana | 3–1 | 3–2 | 1st |
| 2017–18 | UEFA Europa League | Round of 32 | (France) Lyon | 0–1 | 1–3 | 1–4 |
| 2018–19 | UEFA Europa League | Group G | (Scotland) Rangers | 2–2 | 0–0 | 1st |
| 2018–19 | UEFA Europa League | Group G | (Austria) Rapid Wien | 5–0 | 0–0 | 1st |
| 2018–19 | UEFA Europa League | Group G | (Russia) Spartak Moscow | 2–0 | 3–3 | 1st |
| 2018–19 | UEFA Europa League | Round of 32 | (Portugal) Sporting CP | 1–1 | 1–0 | 2–1 |
| 2018–19 | UEFA Europa League | Round of 16 | (Russia) Zenit Saint Petersburg | 2–1 | 3–1 | 5–2 |
| 2018–19 | UEFA Europa League | Quarter-finals | (Spain) Valencia | 1–3 | 0–2 | 1–5 |
| 2020–21 | UEFA Europa League | Group I | (Azerbaijan) Qarabağ | 3–0 (awd.) | 3–1 | 1st |
| 2020–21 | UEFA Europa League | Group I | (Israel) Maccabi Tel Aviv | 4–0 | 1–1 | 1st |
| 2020–21 | UEFA Europa League | Group I | (Turkey) Sivasspor | 5–3 | 1–0 | 1st |
| 2020–21 | UEFA Europa League | Round of 32 | (Austria) Red Bull Salzburg | 2–1 | 2–0 | 4–1 |
| 2020–21 | UEFA Europa League | Round of 16 | (Ukraine) Dynamo Kyiv | 2–0 | 2–0 | 4–0 |
| 2020–21 | UEFA Europa League | Quarter-finals | (Croatia) Dinamo Zagreb | 2–1 | 1–0 | 3–1 |
| 2020–21 | UEFA Europa League | Semi-finals | (England) Arsenal | 2–1 | 0–0 | 2–1 |
| 2020–21 | UEFA Europa League | Final | (England) Manchester United | 1–1 (a.e.t.) (11–10 p) (N) | | |
| 2021 | UEFA Super Cup | Final | (England) Chelsea | 1–1 (a.e.t.) (5–6 p) (N) | | |
| 2021–22 | UEFA Champions League | Group F | (England) Manchester United | 0–2 | 1–2 | 2nd |
| 2021–22 | UEFA Champions League | Group F | (Italy) Atalanta | 2–2 | 3–2 | 2nd |
| 2021–22 | UEFA Champions League | Group F | (Switzerland) Young Boys | 2–0 | 4–1 | 2nd |
| 2021–22 | UEFA Champions League | Round of 16 | (Italy) Juventus | 1–1 | 3–0 | 4–1 |
| 2021–22 | UEFA Champions League | Quarter-finals | (Germany) Bayern Munich | 1–0 | 1–1 | 2–1 |
| 2021–22 | UEFA Champions League | Semi-finals | (England) Liverpool | 2–3 | 0–2 | 2–5 |
| 2022–23 | UEFA Europa Conference League | PO | (Croatia) Hajduk Split | 4–2 | 2–0 | 6–2 |
| 2022–23 | UEFA Europa Conference League | Group C | (Poland) Lech Poznań | 4–3 | 0–3 | 1st |
| 2022–23 | UEFA Europa Conference League | Group C | (Israel) Hapoel Be'er Sheva | 2–2 | 2–1 | 1st |
| 2022–23 | UEFA Europa Conference League | Group C | Austria Wien | 5–0 | 1–0 | 1st |
| 2022–23 | UEFA Europa Conference League | Round of 16 | (Belgium) Anderlecht | 0–1 | 1–1 | 1–2 |
| 2023–24 | UEFA Europa League | Group F | (Greece) Panathinaikos | 3–2 | 0–2 | 1st |
| 2023–24 | UEFA Europa League | Group F | (France) Rennes | 1–0 | 3–2 | 1st |
| 2023–24 | UEFA Europa League | Group F | (Israel) Maccabi Haifa | 0–0 | 2–1 | 1st |
| 2023–24 | UEFA Europa League | Round of 16 | (France) Marseille | 3–1 | 0–4 | 3–5 |
| 2025–26 | UEFA Champions League | League phase | (England) Tottenham Hotspur | —N/a | 0–1 | 35th |
| 2025–26 | UEFA Champions League | League phase | (Italy) Juventus | 2–2 | —N/a | 35th |
| 2025–26 | UEFA Champions League | League phase | (England) Manchester City | 0–2 | —N/a | 35th |
| 2025–26 | UEFA Champions League | League phase | (Cyprus) Pafos | —N/a | 0–1 | 35th |
| 2025–26 | UEFA Champions League | League phase | (Germany) Borussia Dortmund | —N/a | 0–4 | 35th |
| 2025–26 | UEFA Champions League | League phase | (Denmark) Copenhagen | 2–3 | —N/a | 35th |
| 2025–26 | UEFA Champions League | League phase | (Netherlands) Ajax | 1–2 | —N/a | 35th |
| 2025–26 | UEFA Champions League | League phase | (Germany) Bayer Leverkusen | —N/a | 0–3 | 35th |
| 2026–27 | UEFA Champions League | League phase | (Germany) Borussia Dortmund | —N/a | 2–3 | |
| 2026–27 | UEFA Champions League | League phase | (Italy) Napoli | 3–1 | —N/a | |
| 2026–27 | UEFA Champions League | League phase | (England) Liverpool | —N/a | 3–4 | |
| 2026–27 | UEFA Champions League | League phase | (France) Paris Saint-Germain | | —N/a | |
| 2026–27 | UEFA Champions League | League phase | (Czech Republic) Slavia Prague | —N/a | | |
| 2026–27 | UEFA Champions League | League phase | (Azerbaijan) Sabah | | —N/a | |
| 2026–27 | UEFA Champions League | League phase | (Turkey) Fenerbahçe | —N/a | | |
| 2026–27 | UEFA Champions League | League phase | (England) Manchester United | | —N/a | |
