= Weronika Zawistowska =

Polish footballer (born 1999)

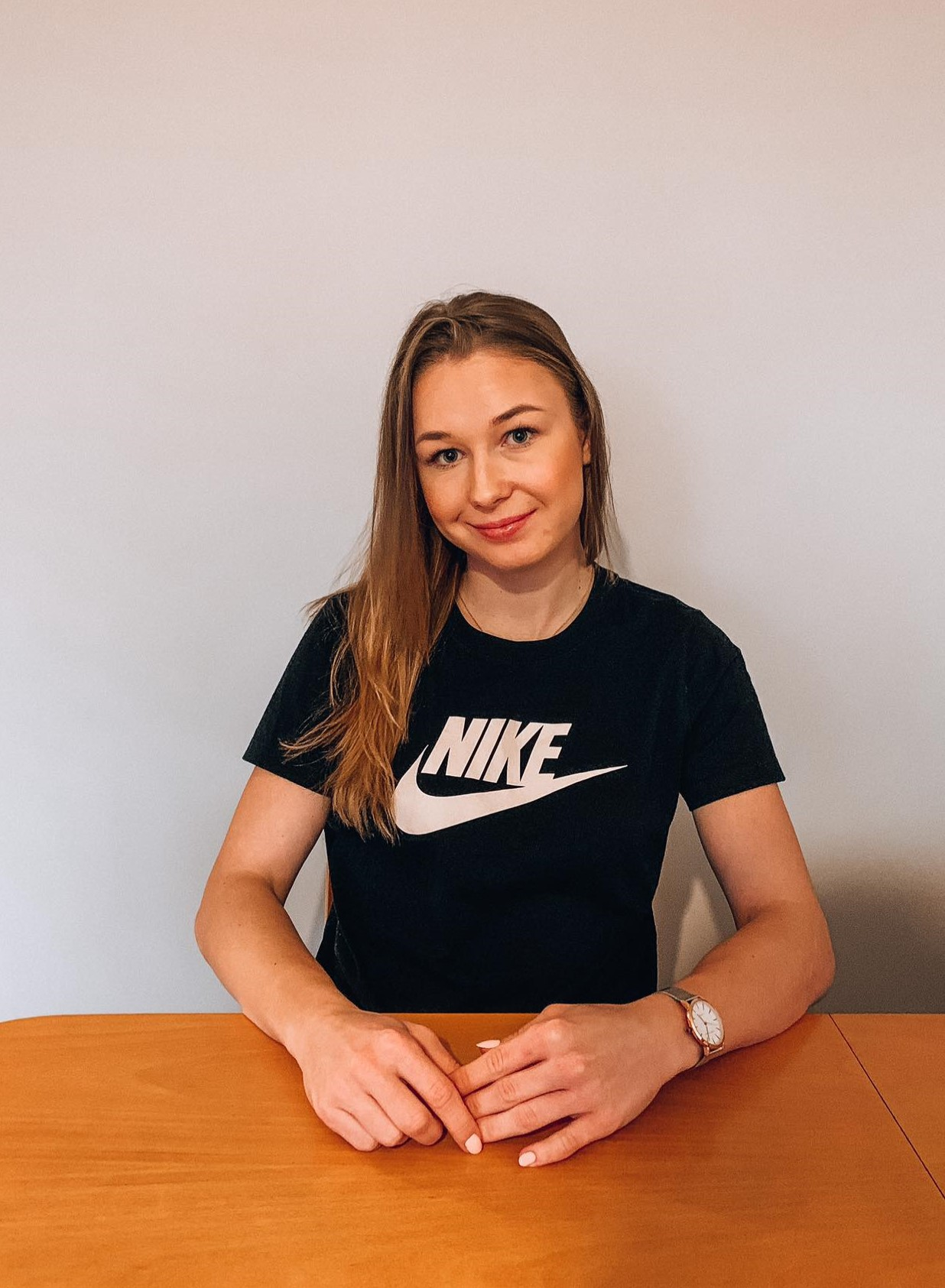
- Zawistowska in 2021

Personal information
- Date of birth: 17 December 1999 (age 26)
- Place of birth: Warsaw, Poland
- Height: 1.68 m (5 ft 6 in)
- Position: Forward

Team information
- Current team: 1. FC Köln
- Number: 10

Youth career
- 2007–2008: UKS Bródno Warsaw
- 2008–2015: Praga Warsaw

Senior career*
Years	Team	Apps	(Gls)
2015–2019	Górnik Łęczna		
2019–2021	Czarni Sosnowiec	27	(9)
2021–2025	Bayern Munich	8	(1)
2021–2023	→ 1. FC Köln (loan)	42	(5)
2025–	1. FC Köln	18	(1)

International career^{‡}
2014–2015	Poland U17	9	(7)
2016–2018	Poland U19	12	(1)
2018–	Poland	53	(10)
- * Club domestic league appearances and goals as of 13:34, 25 October 2026 (UTC) ‡ National team caps and goals as of 22:32, 13 October 2026 (UTC)

Weronika Zawistowska (born 17 December 1999) is a Polish professional footballer who plays as a forward for Frauen-Bundesliga club 1. FC Köln and the Poland national team.

== Career ==
Zawistowska has been capped for the Poland national team, appearing for the team during the 2019 FIFA Women's World Cup qualifying cycle. She represented Poland at the UEFA Women's Euro 2025, making her sole appearance as a substitute in a 0–3 group stage loss to Sweden on 8 July.

== Career statistics ==
=== International ===
As of match played 9 October 2026

Appearances and goals by national team and year
National team	Year	Apps	Goals
Poland	2018	1	0
Poland	2019	5	0
Poland	2020	5	2
Poland	2021	9	2
Poland	2022	11	3
Poland	2023	4	1
Poland	2024	1	0
Poland	2025	10	2
Poland	2026	6	0
Total		52	10

Scores and results list Poland's goal tally first, score column indicates score after each Zawistowska goal.

List of international goals scored by Weronika Zawistowska
No.	Date	Venue	Opponent	Score	Result	Competition
1	23 October 2020	Polonia Stadium, Warsaw, Poland	Azerbaijan	1–0	3–0	UEFA Euro 2022 qualifying
2	23 October 2020	Polonia Stadium, Warsaw, Poland	Azerbaijan	2–0	3–0	UEFA Euro 2022 qualifying
3	14 June 2021	Estadio Cartagonova, Cartanega, Spain	Czech Republic	4–0	5–0	Friendly
4	21 September 2021	Vazgen Sargsyan Republican Stadium, Yerevan, Armenia	Armenia	1–0	1–0	2023 FIFA World Cup qualification
5	19 February 2022	La Manga Club Football Stadium, La Manga, Spain	Hungary	1–1	1–2	2022 Pinatar Cup
6	7 April 2022	Stadion Miejski, Gdynia, Poland	Armenia	2–0	12–0	2023 FIFA World Cup qualification
7	7 April 2022	Stadion Miejski, Gdynia, Poland	Armenia	9–0	12–0	2023 FIFA World Cup qualification
8	11 April 2023	Sparta Stadion, Rotterdam, Netherlands	Netherlands	1–0	1–4	Friendly
9	8 April 2025	Bosnia and Herzegovina FA Training Centre, Zenica, Bosnia and Herzegovina	Bosnia and Herzegovina	1–1	1–1	2025 UEFA Nations League
10	28 November 2025	Gdańsk Stadium, Gdańsk, Poland	Slovenia	1–0	1–0	Friendly

== Honours ==
Górnik Łęczna

- Ekstraliga: 2017–18, 2018–19
- Polish Cup: 2017–18

Czarni Sosnowiec

- Ekstraliga: 2020–21
- Polish Cup: 2020–21

Bayern Munich

- Frauen-Bundesliga: 2023–24, 2024–25
- DFB-Pokal: 2024–25
- DFB-Supercup: 2024
