= 2021 UEFA Europa League final =

Football match

- Match programme cover
- Event: 2020–21 UEFA Europa League
Villarreal	Manchester United
(Spain)	(England)
1	1
- After extra time Villarreal won 11–10 on penalties
- Date: 26 May 2021
- Venue: Stadion Gdańsk, Gdańsk
- Man of the Match: Étienne Capoue (Villarreal)
- Referee: Clément Turpin (France)
- Attendance: 9,412
- Weather: Partly cloudy night 11 °C (52 °F); 45% humidity

The 2021 UEFA Europa League final was the final match of the 2020–21 UEFA Europa League, the 50th season of Europe's secondary club football tournament organised by UEFA, and the 12th season since it was renamed from the UEFA Cup to the UEFA Europa League. It was played on 26 May 2021 at the Stadion Gdańsk in Gdańsk, Poland, between Spanish club Villarreal and English club Manchester United.

The final was originally scheduled to be played at the Estadio Ramón Sánchez Pizjuán in Seville, Spain. However, due to the postponement and relocation of the 2020 final to Cologne, the final hosts were shifted back a year, with Gdańsk instead hosting the 2021 final, as a result of the COVID-19 pandemic in Europe. A capacity limit of 25% was agreed for the 41,620-seater Stadion Gdańsk, resulting in an attendance of 9,412.

Villarreal won the match 11–10 on penalties following a 1–1 draw after extra time, thus winning its first trophy in the competition. As winners, Villarreal earned the right to play against the winners of the 2020–21 UEFA Champions League, Chelsea, in the 2021 UEFA Super Cup. They also qualified for the group stage of the 2021–22 UEFA Champions League.

== Venue ==
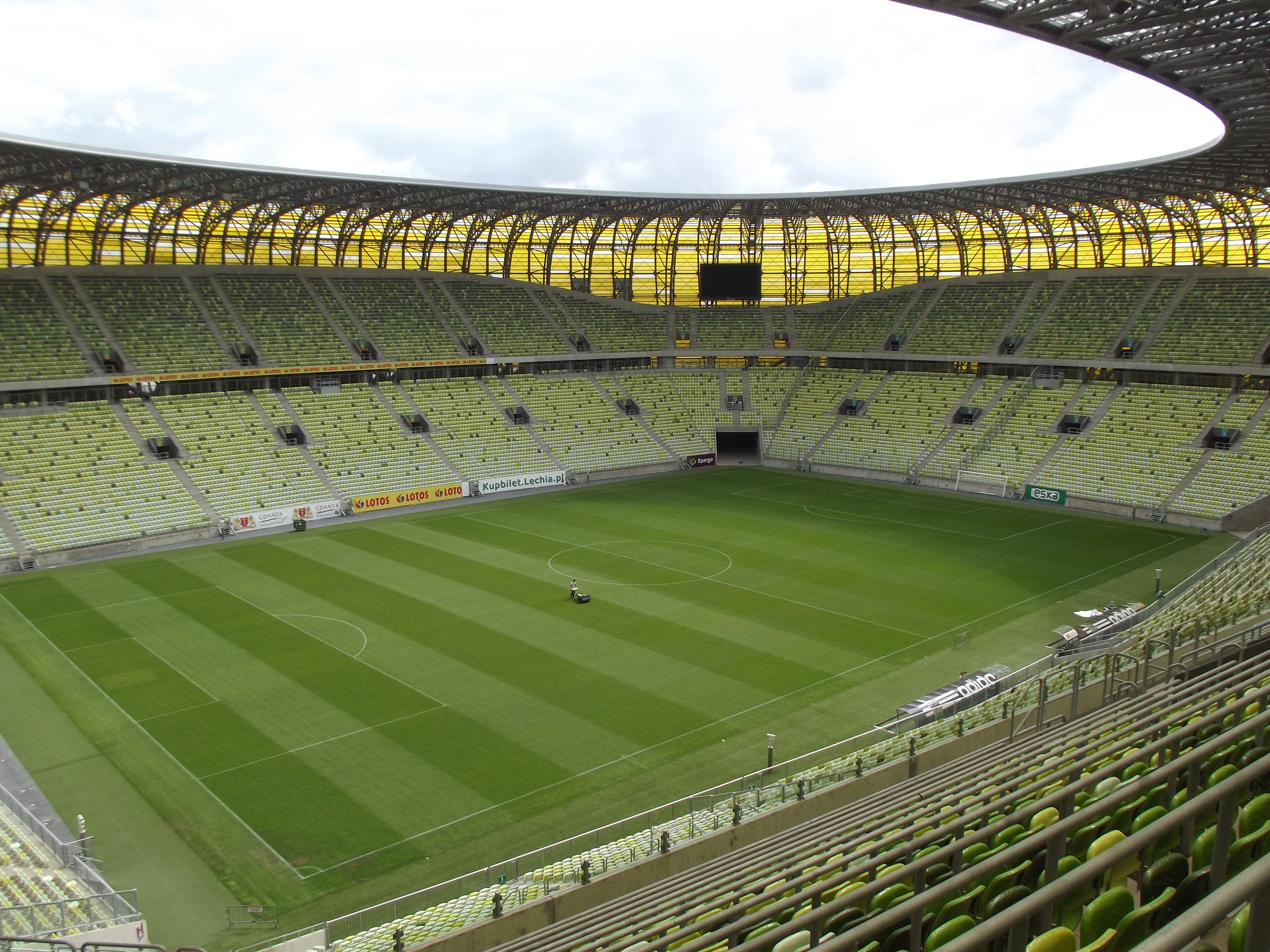
The Stadion Gdańsk in Gdańsk hosted the final.

The match was played at the Stadion Gdańsk in Gdańsk, Poland. At the meeting of the UEFA Executive Committee in Kyiv in May 2018, the stadium was initially selected to host the 2020 UEFA Europa League final, but when the COVID-19 pandemic forced UEFA to move the latter stages of the 2019–20 competition to Germany, the UEFA Executive Committee delayed Gdańsk Stadium's hosting of the Europa League final to 2021. The original venues for the 2021 and 2022 finals were also delayed by a year.

This was the first UEFA club match hosted at the stadium, which was one of the venues for UEFA Euro 2012. It was the second UEFA club competition final to be played in Poland, as the 2015 UEFA Europa League final was played at the National Stadium in Warsaw. When the stadium was selected to host the 2020 final, it was known as Stadion Energa Gdańsk, so due to UEFA sponsorship regulations, marketing materials for the match referred to the venue as Gdańsk Stadium. Although the sponsorship deal with Energa was ended in November 2020, the stadium continued to be known as Gdańsk Stadium for the final.

=== Host selection ===
An open bidding process was launched on 22 September 2017 by UEFA to select the venues of the finals of the UEFA Champions League, UEFA Europa League, and UEFA Women's Champions League in 2020. Associations had until 31 October 2017 to express interest, and bid dossiers had to be submitted by 1 March 2018. Associations hosting matches at UEFA Euro 2020 were not allowed to bid for the 2020 UEFA Europa League final.

UEFA announced on 3 November 2017 that two associations had expressed interest in hosting the 2020 UEFA Europa League final.

Bidding associations for final
Association	Stadium	City	Capacity	Notes
Poland	Stadion Gdańsk	Gdańsk	43,615	
Portugal	Estádio do Dragão	Porto	50,035	Also bid for 2020 UEFA Super Cup

The Stadion Gdańsk in Gdańsk was selected by the UEFA Executive Committee during their meeting in Kyiv on 24 May 2018.

On 17 June 2020, the UEFA Executive Committee announced that due to the postponement and relocation of the 2020 final, Gdańsk would instead host the 2021 final.

== Background ==
This was Villarreal's fourth ever final in an official knockout tournament, having played previously three in UEFA competitions, all in the UEFA Intertoto Cup, winning it in 2003 and 2004. On the other hand, this was head coach Unai Emery's fifth European final, all in the UEFA Europa League; he won three successive titles with Sevilla in 2014, 2015 and 2016, before losing in 2019 with Arsenal.

This was Manchester United's second UEFA Cup/Europa League final, having won the only previous occasion in 2017. Overall, it was their eighth European major final between the European Cup/Champions League, Cup Winners' Cup, and the UEFA Cup/Europa League. Ole Gunnar Solskjær reached his first final as the club's manager, having scored the winning goal in the 1999 UEFA Champions League final playing for them, exactly 22 years prior.

The clubs previously met four times, in the 2005–06 and 2008–09 UEFA Champions League group stages. All games ended in goalless draws.

=== Previous finals ===
In the following table, finals until 2009 were in the UEFA Cup era, since 2010 were in the UEFA Europa League era.

Team	Previous final appearances (bold indicates winners)
(Spain) Villarreal	None
(England) Manchester United	1 (**2017**)

== Route to the final ==
Note: In all results below, the score of the finalist is given first (H: home; A: away).

(Spain) Villarreal				Round	(England) Manchester United			
Europa League					Champions League			
Opponent	Result			Group stage (EL, CL)	Opponent	Result		
(Turkey) Sivasspor	5–3 (H)			Matchday 1	(France) Paris Saint-Germain	2–1 (A)		
(Azerbaijan) Qarabağ	3–1 (A) (Note: Qarabağ played their home match against Villarreal in Istanbul, Turkey as UEFA matches in Armenia and Azerbaijan were temporarily suspended due to the 2020 Nagorno-Karabakh war.)			Matchday 2	(Germany) RB Leipzig	5–0 (H)		
(Israel) Maccabi Tel Aviv	4–0 (H)			Matchday 3	(Turkey) İstanbul Başakşehir	1–2 (A)		
(Israel) Maccabi Tel Aviv	1–1 (A)			Matchday 4	(Turkey) İstanbul Başakşehir	4–1 (H)		
(Turkey) Sivasspor	1–0 (A)			Matchday 5	(France) Paris Saint-Germain	1–3 (H)		
(Azerbaijan) Qarabağ	3–0 (H) (Note: The Villarreal v Qarabağ match was cancelled and awarded as a 3–0 win to Villarreal after several players of the Qarabağ squad tested positive for SARS-CoV-2.)			Matchday 6	(Germany) RB Leipzig	2–3 (A)		
Group I winners: Pos / Team / Pld / Pts; 1 / (Spain) Villarreal / 6 / 16; 2 / (Israel) Maccabi Tel Aviv / 6 / 11; 3 / (Turkey) Sivasspor / 6 / 6; 4 / (Azerbaijan) Qarabağ / 6 / 1; Source: UEFA				Final standings	Group H third place: Pos / Team / Pld / Pts; 1 / (France) Paris Saint-Germain / 6 / 12; 2 / (Germany) RB Leipzig / 6 / 12; 3 / (England) Manchester United / 6 / 9; 4 / (Turkey) İstanbul Başakşehir / 6 / 3; Source: UEFA			
Group I winners: Pos / Team / Pld / Pts; 1 / (Spain) Villarreal / 6 / 16; 2 / (Israel) Maccabi Tel Aviv / 6 / 11; 3 / (Turkey) Sivasspor / 6 / 6; 4 / (Azerbaijan) Qarabağ / 6 / 1; Source: UEFA					Europa League			
Opponent	Agg.	1st leg	2nd leg	Knockout phase	Opponent	Agg.	1st leg	2nd leg
(Austria) Red Bull Salzburg	4–1	2–0 (A)	2–1 (H)	Round of 32	(Spain) Real Sociedad	4–0	4–0 (A) (Note: The first leg away of Manchester United's round of 32 tie against Real Sociedad was played in Turin, Italy due to travel restrictions related to the COVID-19 pandemic from the United Kingdom to Spain.)	0–0 (H)
(Ukraine) Dynamo Kyiv	4–0	2–0 (A)	2–0 (H)	Round of 16	(Italy) Milan	2–1	1–1 (H)	1–0 (A)
(Croatia) Dinamo Zagreb	3–1	1–0 (A)	2–1 (H)	Quarter-finals	(Spain) Granada	4–0	2–0 (A)	2–0 (H)
(England) Arsenal	2–1	2–1 (H)	0–0 (A)	Semi-finals	(Italy) Roma	8–5	6–2 (H)	2–3 (A)

== Pre-match ==
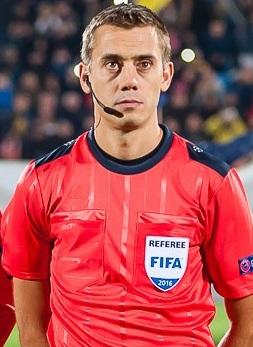
Frenchman Clément Turpin was the referee for the final.

=== Officials ===
On 12 May 2021, UEFA named Frenchman Clément Turpin as the referee for the final. Turpin had been a FIFA referee since 2010, and was previously the fourth official in the 2018 UEFA Champions League final. He officiated six matches in the 2020–21 Champions League season, and one leg in the 2020–21 Europa League round of 32. He served as a referee at UEFA Euro 2016 in France and the 2018 FIFA World Cup in Russia, and was selected as an official for UEFA Euro 2020. Turpin also was a video assistant referee at the 2017 FIFA Confederations Cup in Russia (including in the final), the 2017 FIFA Club World Cup in the United Arab Emirates and the 2019 FIFA Women's World Cup in France. He was joined by five of his fellow countrymen, with Nicolas Danos and Cyril Gringore as assistant referees, François Letexier as the video assistant referee, and Jérôme Brisard and Benjamin Pagès as two of the assistant VAR officials. Slavko Vinčić of Slovenia was the fourth official, while Dutchman Pol van Boekel served as the remaining assistant VAR.

== Match ==
=== Summary ===
Villarreal opened the scoring in the 29th minute with a goal from Gerard Moreno, diverting the ball into the net with his right leg from six yards out after a free-kick from the left side delivered by Dani Parejo. Edinson Cavani equalized in the 55th minute after a shot by Marcus Rashford from 20 yards deflected off of Scott McTominay to Cavani, who scored with a low shot from five yards out. There were no more goals in normal time or in extra time with the match going to a penalty shoot-out. The first ten penalties from both teams were converted, leaving the goalkeepers to take a penalty. Villarreal keeper Gerónimo Rulli converted his penalty, and then saved David de Gea's attempt to his left, winning his side the trophy.

=== Details ===
The "home" team (for administrative purposes) was determined by an additional draw to be held after the quarter-final and semi-final draws.

26 May 2021
21:00 UTC+2

Villarreal (Spain)	1–1 (a.e.t.)	(England) Manchester United
Gerard 29'	Report	Cavani 55'
Penalties
Gerard (penalty scored); Raba (penalty scored); Alcácer (penalty scored); Moreno (penalty scored); Parejo (penalty scored); Gómez (penalty scored); Albiol (penalty scored); Coquelin (penalty scored); Gaspar (penalty scored); Torres (penalty scored); Rulli (penalty scored)	11–10	(penalty scored) Mata; (penalty scored) Telles; (penalty scored) Fernandes; (penalty scored) Rashford; (penalty scored) Cavani; (penalty scored) Fred; (penalty scored) James; (penalty scored) Shaw; (penalty scored) Tuanzebe; (penalty scored) Lindelöf; (penalty missed) De Gea

Stadion Gdańsk, Gdańsk
Attendance: 9,412
Referee: Clément Turpin (France)

Villarreal	Manchester United

GK	13	(Argentina) Gerónimo Rulli
RB	8	(Argentina) Juan Foyth	(yellow card) 84'	(substituted off) 88'
CB	3	(Spain) Raúl Albiol (c)
CB	4	(Spain) Pau Torres
LB	24	(Spain) Alfonso Pedraza		(substituted off) 88'
CM	5	(Spain) Dani Parejo
CM	25	(France) Étienne Capoue	(yellow card) 54'	(substituted off) 120+3'
CM	14	(Spain) Manu Trigueros		(substituted off) 77'
RF	7	(Spain) Gerard Moreno
CF	9	(Colombia) Carlos Bacca		(substituted off) 60'
LF	30	(Spain) Yéremy Pino		(substituted off) 77'
Substitutes:
GK	1	(Spain) Sergio Asenjo
DF	2	(Spain) Mario Gaspar		(substituted on) 88'
DF	6	(Argentina) Ramiro Funes Mori
DF	15	(Ecuador) Pervis Estupiñán
DF	18	(Spain) Alberto Moreno		(substituted on) 88'
DF	20	(Spain) Rubén Peña
DF	21	(Spain) Jaume Costa
MF	12	(Spain) Dani Raba		(substituted on) 120+3'
MF	19	(France) Francis Coquelin		(substituted on) 60'
MF	23	(Spain) Moi Gómez		(substituted on) 77'
FW	17	(Spain) Paco Alcácer		(substituted on) 77'
FW	34	(Spain) Fer Niño
Manager:
(Spain) Unai Emery

GK	1	(Spain) David de Gea
RB	29	(England) Aaron Wan-Bissaka		(substituted off) 120+3'
CB	2	(Sweden) Victor Lindelöf
CB	3	(Ivory Coast) Eric Bailly	(yellow card) 82'	(substituted off) 116'
LB	23	(England) Luke Shaw
CM	6	(France) Paul Pogba		(substituted off) 116'
CM	39	(Scotland) Scott McTominay		(substituted off) 120+3'
RW	11	(England) Mason Greenwood		(substituted off) 100'
AM	18	(Portugal) Bruno Fernandes (c)
LW	10	(England) Marcus Rashford
CF	7	(Uruguay) Edinson Cavani	(yellow card) 113'
Substitutes:
GK	13	(England) Lee Grant
GK	26	(England) Dean Henderson
DF	5	(England) Harry Maguire
DF	27	(Brazil) Alex Telles		(substituted on) 120+3'
DF	33	(England) Brandon Williams
DF	38	(England) Axel Tuanzebe		(substituted on) 116'
MF	8	(Spain) Juan Mata		(substituted on) 120+3'
MF	17	(Brazil) Fred		(substituted on) 100'
MF	19	(Ivory Coast) Amad Diallo
MF	21	(Wales) Daniel James		(substituted on) 116'
MF	31	(Serbia) Nemanja Matić
MF	34	(Netherlands) Donny van de Beek
Manager:
(Norway) Ole Gunnar Solskjær

Man of the Match:
Étienne Capoue (Villarreal)

Assistant referees:
Nicolas Danos (France)
Cyril Gringore (France)
Fourth official:
Slavko Vinčić (Slovenia)
Video assistant referee:
François Letexier (France)
Assistant video assistant referees:
Jérôme Brisard (France)
Benjamin Pagès (France)
Pol van Boekel (Netherlands)

Match rules

- 90 minutes
- 30 minutes of extra time if necessary
- Penalty shoot-out if scores still level
- Twelve named substitutes
- Maximum of five substitutions, with a sixth allowed in extra time (Note: Each team was given only three opportunities to make substitutions, with a fourth opportunity in extra time, excluding substitutions made at half-time, before the start of extra time and at half-time in extra time.)

=== Statistics ===
First half
Statistic	Villarreal	Manchester United
Goals scored	1	0
Total shots	5	4
Shots on target	1	1
Saves	2	0
Ball possession	36%	64%
Corner kicks	4	1
Fouls committed	2	6
Offsides	0	1
Yellow cards	0	0
Red cards	0	0

Second half
Statistic	Villarreal	Manchester United
Goals scored	0	1
Total shots	3	9
Shots on target	0	1
Saves	0	0
Ball possession	44%	56%
Corner kicks	2	2
Fouls committed	7	5
Offsides	0	2
Yellow cards	2	1
Red cards	0	0

Extra time
Statistic	Villarreal	Manchester United
Goals scored	0	0
Total shots	4	1
Shots on target	0	0
Saves	0	0
Ball possession	52%	48%
Corner kicks	1	0
Fouls committed	1	4
Offsides	0	1
Yellow cards	0	1
Red cards	0	0

Overall
Statistic	Villarreal	Manchester United
Goals scored	1	1
Total shots	12	14
Shots on target	1	2
Saves	2	0
Ball possession	43%	57%
Corner kicks	7	3
Fouls committed	10	15
Offsides	0	4
Yellow cards	2	2
Red cards	0	0

== See also ==
- 2021 UEFA Champions League final
- 2021 UEFA Women's Champions League final
- 2021 UEFA Super Cup
- Manchester United F.C. in international football
- Villarreal CF in European football
- 2020–21 Manchester United F.C. season
- 2020–21 Villarreal CF season
