= Klaudia Słowińska =

Polish association football player

Personal information
- Date of birth: 13 August 1999 (age 27)
- Height: 1.67 m (5 ft 6 in)
- Position: Midfielder

Team information
- Current team: GKS Katowice
- Number: 24

Youth career
- –2014: Sztorm Gdynia

Senior career*
Years	Team	Apps	(Gls)
2014–2018	Sztorm Gdańsk		
2018–2023	AP Orlen Gdańsk	90	(18)
2023–	GKS Katowice	43	(8)

International career^{‡}
- Poland U17
- Poland U19
2024–	Poland	9	(1)
- * Club domestic league appearances and goals as of 19:53, 2 June 2026 (UTC) ‡ National team caps and goals as of 12 July 2025

Klaudia Słowińska (born 13 August 1999) is a Polish professional footballer who plays as a midfielder for Ekstraliga club GKS Katowice and the Poland national team.

== International career ==
A former youth international for Poland, Słowińska made her debut for the senior team as a second half substitute in a 2–1 away win over Romania on 25 October 2024. Her first senior goal came against Bosnia and Herzegovina in a 5–1 UEFA Nations League win on 4 April 2025.

== Career statistics ==
=== International ===
As of match played 12 July 2025

Appearances and goals by national team and year
National team	Year	Apps	Goals
Poland	2024	2	0
Poland	2025	7	1
Total		9	1

Scores and results list Poland's goal tally first, score column indicates score after each Słowińska goal.

List of international goals scored by Klaudia Słowińska
No.	Date	Venue	Opponent	Score	Result	Competition
1	4 April 2025	Gdańsk Stadium, Gdańsk, Poland	Bosnia and Herzegovina	4–1	5–1	2025 UEFA Nations League

== Honours ==
Sztorm Gdańsk

- I liga North: 2014–15

AP Orlen Gdańsk

- I liga North: 2019–20

GKS Katowice

- Ekstraliga: 2024–25
- Polish Cup: 2023–24
