= 2021 UEFA Super Cup =

- Match programme cover
Chelsea	Villarreal
(England)	(Spain)
1	1
- After extra time Chelsea won 6–5 on penalties
- Date: 11 August 2021
- Venue: Windsor Park, Belfast
- Man of the Match: Gerard Moreno (Villarreal)
- Referee: Sergei Karasev (Russia)
- Attendance: 10,435
- Weather: Partly cloudy 18 °C (64 °F); 59% humidity

The 2021 UEFA Super Cup was the 46th edition of the UEFA Super Cup, an annual football match organised by UEFA and contested by the winners of the two main European club competitions, the UEFA Champions League and the UEFA Europa League. The match featured English club Chelsea, the winners of the 2020–21 UEFA Champions League, and Spanish club Villarreal, the winners of the 2020–21 UEFA Europa League. It was played at Windsor Park—went by the name of National Football Stadium at Windsor Park—in Belfast, Northern Ireland, on 11 August 2021. A capacity limit was agreed for the 18,500-seater Windsor Park, resulting in an attendance of 10,435.

Chelsea won the match 6–5 on penalties following a 1–1 draw after extra time for their second UEFA Super Cup title.

This was the final edition of the UEFA Super Cup to use extra-time, as they removed it in the 2023 edition.

== Teams ==
Team	Qualification	Previous participations (bold indicates winners)
(England) Chelsea	Winners of the 2020–21 UEFA Champions League	4 (**1998**, 2012, 2013, 2019)
(Spain) Villarreal	Winners of the 2020–21 UEFA Europa League	None

== Venue ==
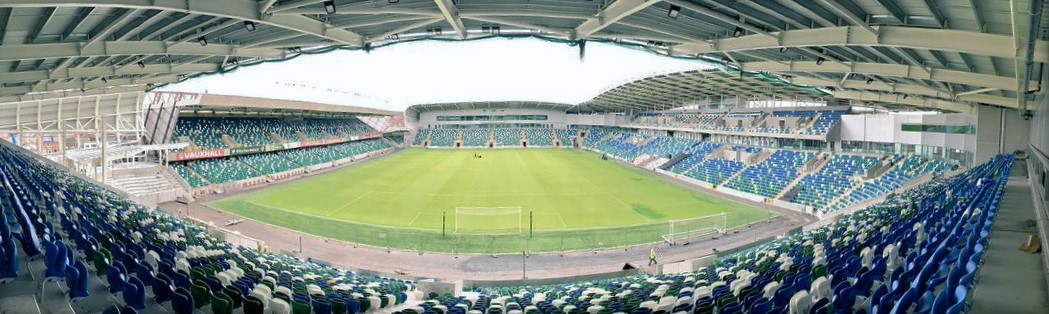
Windsor Park in Belfast hosted the match.

The match was the first UEFA club competition final to be played in Northern Ireland. The 18,500-capacity Windsor Park is the home of Linfield and the Northern Ireland national team. Opened in 1905, the stadium was most recently renovated from 2014 to 2016 with aid from UEFA's HatTrick assistance programme. The venue previously hosted the finals of the 2005 UEFA European Under-19 Championship and 2017 UEFA Women's Under-19 Championship.

=== Host selection ===
An open bidding process was launched on 28 September 2018 by UEFA to select the venues of the finals of the UEFA Champions League, UEFA Europa League, and UEFA Women's Champions League in 2021. Associations had until 26 October 2018 to express interest, and bid dossiers must be submitted by 15 February 2019.

UEFA announced on 1 November 2018 that four associations had expressed interest in hosting the 2021 UEFA Super Cup, and on 22 February 2019 that all four associations submitted their dossiers by the deadline.

Bidding associations for 2021 UEFA Super Cup
Country	Stadium	City	Capacity
Belarus	Dinamo Stadium	Minsk	22,000
Finland	Olympic Stadium	Helsinki	36,000
Northern Ireland	Windsor Park	Belfast	18,434
Ukraine	Metalist Stadium	Kharkiv	40,003

Windsor Park was selected by the UEFA Executive Committee during their meeting in Ljubljana, Slovenia on 24 September 2019.

== Pre-match ==
=== Officials ===
On 6 August 2021, UEFA named Russian official Sergei Karasev as the referee for the match. Karasev had been a FIFA referee since 2010, and officiated at UEFA Euro 2016, the 2018 FIFA World Cup and UEFA Euro 2020. He was joined by fellow countrymen Igor Demeshko and Maksim Gavrilin as assistant referees, while Aleksei Kulbakov of Belarus served as the fourth official. Marco Fritz of Germany was selected as the video assistant referee (VAR), with Paweł Gil of Poland and Massimiliano Irrati of Italy serving as the assistant VAR officials. Irrati's countryman Filippo Meli was selected as the reserve assistant referee.

== Match ==
=== Summary ===
Chelsea opened the scoring after 27 minutes when Kai Havertz's low cross from the left was swept into the net by Hakim Ziyech from seven yards out. Ziyech was substituted after a shoulder injury just before half-time. Alberto Moreno hit a volley off the underside of the crossbar in first-half injury time. Villarreal equalised in the 73rd minute when Gerard Moreno scored with a clinical right-foot finish to the top left corner of the net after a flick-back from Boulaye Dia on the right of the penalty area. The match went to extra-time with Chelsea goalkeeper Édouard Mendy being replaced in the last minute by Kepa Arrizabalaga. Arrizabalaga saved two penalties, the decisive one low to his right from Raúl Albiol allowed Chelsea to win 6–5 in the shoot-out.

=== Details ===
The Champions League winners were designated as the "home" team for administrative purposes.

11 August 2021
20:00 UTC+1

Chelsea (England)	1–1 (a.e.t.)	(Spain) Villarreal
Ziyech 27'	Report	Gerard 73'
Penalties
Havertz (penalty missed); Azpilicueta (penalty scored); Alonso (penalty scored); Mount (penalty scored); Jorginho (penalty scored); Pulisic (penalty scored); Rüdiger (penalty scored)	6–5	(penalty scored) Gerard; (penalty missed) Mandi; (penalty scored) Estupiñán; (penalty scored) Gómez; (penalty scored) Raba; (penalty scored) Foyth; (penalty missed) Albiol

Windsor Park, Belfast
Attendance: 10,435
Referee: Sergei Karasev (Russia)

**Chelsea**	**Villarreal**

GK	16	(Senegal) Édouard Mendy		(substituted off) 119'
CB	15	(France) Kurt Zouma		(substituted off) 66'
CB	14	(England) Trevoh Chalobah
CB	2	(Germany) Antonio Rüdiger	(yellow card) 44'
RM	20	(England) Callum Hudson-Odoi		(substituted off) 82'
CM	7	(France) N'Golo Kanté (c)		(substituted off) 65'
CM	17	(Croatia) Mateo Kovačić
LM	3	(Spain) Marcos Alonso
AM	22	(Morocco) Hakim Ziyech		(substituted off) 43'
AM	29	(Germany) Kai Havertz
CF	11	(Germany) Timo Werner		(substituted off) 65'
Substitutes:
GK	1	(Spain) Kepa Arrizabalaga	(yellow card) 120+'	(substituted on) 119'
DF	4	(Denmark) Andreas Christensen		(substituted on) 66'
DF	6	(Brazil) Thiago Silva
DF	21	(England) Ben Chilwell
DF	24	(England) Reece James
DF	28	(Spain) César Azpilicueta		(substituted on) 82'
DF	33	(Italy) Emerson
MF	5	(Italy) Jorginho		(substituted on) 65'
MF	10	(United States) Christian Pulisic		(substituted on) 43'
MF	19	(England) Mason Mount		(substituted on) 65'
FW	9	(England) Tammy Abraham
FW	12	(England) Ruben Loftus-Cheek
Manager:
(Germany) Thomas Tuchel			(yellow card) 45+1'

GK	1	(Spain) Sergio Asenjo
RB	8	(Argentina) Juan Foyth
CB	3	(Spain) Raúl Albiol (c)
CB	4	(Spain) Pau Torres
LB	24	(Spain) Alfonso Pedraza		(substituted off) 58'
CM	14	(Spain) Manu Trigueros		(substituted off) 70'
CM	25	(France) Étienne Capoue		(substituted off) 70'
CM	18	(Spain) Alberto Moreno		(substituted off) 85'
RF	21	(Spain) Yéremy Pino	(yellow card) 61'	(substituted off) 91'
CF	7	(Spain) Gerard Moreno
LF	16	(Senegal) Boulaye Dia		(substituted off) 85'
Substitutes:
GK	13	(Argentina) Gerónimo Rulli
DF	2	(Spain) Mario Gaspar		(substituted on) 70'
DF	12	(Ecuador) Pervis Estupiñán		(substituted on) 58'
DF	15	(Spain) Jorge Cuenca
DF	20	(Spain) Rubén Peña
DF	22	(Algeria) Aïssa Mandi		(substituted on) 91'
MF	6	(Spain) Manu Morlanes		(substituted on) 85'
MF	10	(Spain) Vicente Iborra
MF	17	(Spain) Dani Raba	(yellow card) 119'	(substituted on) 85'
MF	23	(Spain) Moi Gómez		(substituted on) 70'
FW	9	(Spain) Paco Alcácer
FW	34	(Spain) Fer Niño
Manager:
(Spain) Unai Emery

Man of the Match:
Gerard Moreno (Villarreal)

Assistant referees:
Igor Demeshko (Russia)
Maksim Gavrilin (Russia)
Fourth official:
Aleksei Kulbakov (Belarus)
Reserve assistant referee:
Filippo Meli (Italy)
Video assistant referee:
Marco Fritz (Germany)
Assistant video assistant referees:
Paweł Gil (Poland)
Massimiliano Irrati (Italy)

**Match rules**

- 90 minutes
- 30 minutes of extra time if necessary
- Penalty shoot-out if scores still level
- Twelve named substitutes
- Maximum of five substitutions, with a sixth allowed in extra time (Note: Each team was given only three opportunities to make substitutions, with a fourth opportunity in extra time, excluding substitutions made at half-time, before the start of extra time and at half-time in extra time.)

=== Statistics ===
First half
Statistic	Chelsea	Villarreal
Goals scored	1	0
Total shots	6	6
Shots on target	3	1
Saves	1	2
Ball possession	61%	39%
Corner kicks	4	2
Fouls committed	5	6
Offsides	0	0
Yellow cards	2	0
Red cards	0	0

Second half
Statistic	Chelsea	Villarreal
Goals scored	0	1
Total shots	8	5
Shots on target	3	3
Saves	2	3
Ball possession	49%	51%
Corner kicks	2	3
Fouls committed	3	4
Offsides	2	1
Yellow cards	0	1
Red cards	0	0

Extra time
Statistic	Chelsea	Villarreal
Goals scored	0	0
Total shots	7	1
Shots on target	1	0
Saves	0	1
Ball possession	63%	37%
Corner kicks	3	0
Fouls committed	2	5
Offsides	2	1
Yellow cards	1	1
Red cards	0	0

Overall
Statistic	Chelsea	Villarreal
Goals scored	1	1
Total shots	21	12
Shots on target	7	4
Saves	3	6
Ball possession	57%	43%
Corner kicks	9	5
Fouls committed	10	15
Offsides	4	2
Yellow cards	3	2
Red cards	0	0

== See also ==
- 2021 UEFA Champions League final
- 2021 UEFA Europa League final
- 2021–22 UEFA Champions League
- 2021–22 UEFA Europa League
- 2021–22 Chelsea F.C. season
- 2021–22 Villarreal CF season
- Chelsea F.C. in international football
- Villarreal CF in European football
