= Adriana Achcińska =

Polish footballer (born 2002)

Personal information
- Date of birth: 22 April 2002 (age 24)
- Place of birth: Lubań, Poland
- Height: 1.65 m (5 ft 5 in)
- Position: Midfielder

Team information
- Current team: VfB Stuttgart
- Number: 22

Youth career
- 2012–2015: Granica Bogatynia

Senior career*
Years	Team	Apps	(Gls)
2015–2018	Miedź Legnica		
2018–2021	UKS SMS Łódź	53	(10)
2021–2026	1. FC Köln	84	(5)
2026–	VfB Stuttgart	11	(0)

International career^{‡}
2017–2019	Poland U17	18	(5)
2019	Poland U19	5	(1)
2019–	Poland	56	(7)
- * Club domestic league appearances and goals as of 20:20, 22 November 2026 (UTC) ‡ National team caps and goals as of 22:35, 13 October 2026 (UTC)

Adriana Achcińska (born 22 April 2002) is a Polish professional footballer who plays as a midfielder for Frauen-Bundesliga club VfB Stuttgart and the Poland national team.

== Career statistics ==
=== International ===
As of match played 13 October 2026

Appearances and goals by national team and year
National team	Year	Apps	Goals
Poland	2019	1	0
Poland	2020	4	1
Poland	2021	10	1
Poland	2022	6	1
Poland	2023	6	1
Poland	2024	8	0
Poland	2025	13	3
Poland	2026	8	0
Total		56	7

Scores and results list Poland's goal tally first, score column indicates score after each Achcińska goal.

List of international goals scored by Adriana Achcińska
No.	Date	Venue	Opponent	Score	Result	Competition
1	27 October 2020	Zimbru Stadium, Chișinău, Moldova	Moldova	2–0	3–0	UEFA Euro 2022 qualifying
2	14 June 2021	Estadio Cartagonova, Cartagena, Spain	Czech Republic	3–0	5–0	Friendly
3	7 April 2022	Municipal Stadium, Gdynia, Poland	Armenia	6–0	12–0	2023 FIFA World Cup qualification
4	1 December 2023	Subcarpathian Football Center, Stalowa Wola, Poland	Ukraine	1–0	1–0	2023–24 UEFA Nations League
5	21 February 2025	Gdańsk Stadium, Gdańsk, Poland	Northern Ireland	2–0	2–0	2025 UEFA Nations League
6	4 April 2025	Gdańsk Stadium, Gdańsk, Poland	Bosnia and Herzegovina	3–1	5–1	2025 UEFA Nations League
7	30 May 2025	Seaview, Belfast, Northern Ireland	Northern Ireland	4–0	4–0	2025 UEFA Nations League
