= Maaria Roth =

Finnish association football player

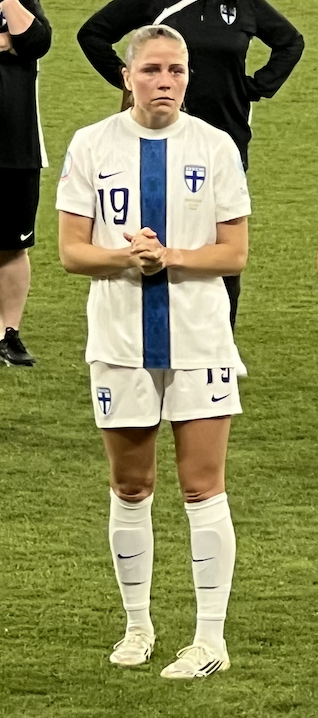
- Maaria Roth with Finland in 2025.

Personal information
- Date of birth: 13 June 1997 (age 29)
- Height: 1.69 m (5 ft 7 in)
- Position: Defender

Team information
- Current team: HJK
- Number: 51

Senior career*
Years	Team	Apps	(Gls)
2015–2018	Ilves	66	(4)
2018–	HJK	134	(8)

International career^{‡}
2013	Finland U17		
2015–2016	Finland U19	7	(1)
2025–	Finland	4	(0)
- * Club domestic league appearances and goals as of 24 June 2025 ‡ National team caps and goals as of 10 July 2025

Maaria Roth (born 13 June 1997) is a Finnish footballer and futsal player who plays as a defender for Kansallinen Liiga club HJK and the Finland national team. She has also played futsal for Naisten Futsal-Liiga club FC Nokia.

== International career ==
Roth was part of Finland's 23-player squad for the UEFA Women's Euro 2025 in Switzerland.

== Career statistics ==
As of 2 July 2025

Appearances and goals by national team and year
National team	Year	Apps	Goals
Finland	2025	3	0
Total		3	0
