= Gdańsk Stadium =

Stadium in Gdańsk, Poland

- Polsat Plus Arena Gdańsk

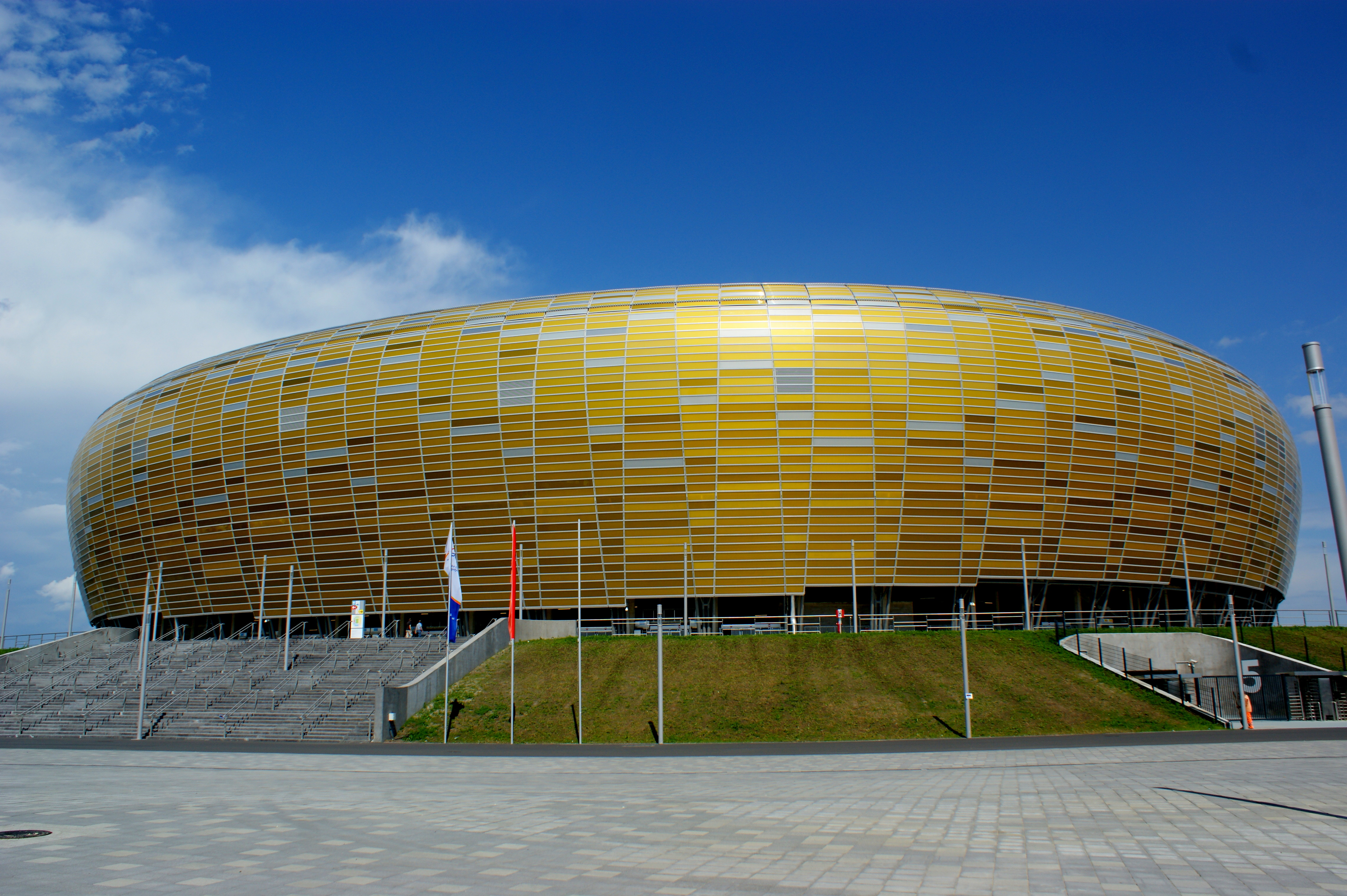
- UEFA Category 4 Stadium
- Interactive map of Gdańsk Stadium
- Full name: Stadion Gdańsk
- Former names: Baltic Arena (during construction); PGE Arena Gdańsk (2010–2015); Arena Gdańsk (UEFA Euro 2012); Stadion w Gdańsku Letnicy (2015); Stadion Energa Gdańsk (2015–2020); Stadion w Gdańsku Letnicy (2020–2021); Polsat Plus Arena Gdańsk (2021–present)
- Location: ul. Pokoleń Lechii Gdańsk 1, 80-560 Gdańsk, Poland
- Coordinates: 54°23′24″N 18°38′25″E
- Owner: City of Gdańsk
- Operator: Arena Gdańsk Operator Sp. z o.o.
- Capacity: 41,620
- Surface: Field (Grass)
- Record attendance: 52,500 (Ed Sheeran - +–=÷× Tour, 12 & July 2024)
- Field size: 105 × 68 metres
- Public transit: Gdańsk Stadion Expo

Construction
- Groundbreaking: 2008
- Built: 2008–2011
- Opened: 14 August 2011
- Cost: PLN zł 863 million EUR € 204 million
- Architect: RKW Rhode Kellermann Wawrowsky
- Project manager: Krzysztof Czarnecki
- Structural engineer: Bollinger+Grohmann

Tenants
- Lechia Gdańsk (2011–present); Poland national football team (selected matches); Poland women's national football team (2024–present): Major sporting events hosted; 2021 UEFA Europa League Final

Website
- polsatplusarenagdansk.pl

The Gdańsk Stadium (Polish: Stadion Gdańsk), known for sponsorship reasons as the Polsat Plus Arena Gdańsk since May 2021, is a football stadium in Gdańsk, Pomeranian Voivodeship, Poland. It is used mostly for football matches and is the home stadium of Lechia Gdańsk, which competes in the I liga, and the Poland women's national football team. The stadium is located at the 1 Pokoleń Lechii Gdańsk Street (English: Generations of Lechia Gdańsk) in the northern part of the city (Letnica district). The total capacity is 41,620 spectators, all seated and roofed. The stadium is the second largest arena in Ekstraklasa and the third largest in the country (after the Stadion Narodowy and the Stadion Śląski).

Construction of the stadium started in 2008 and was completed mid-2011. The opening match was between Lechia Gdańsk and Cracovia and ended in a 1–1 draw. Its first international match was between Poland and Germany, on 6 September 2011 that ended 2–2. The match was relocated from Warsaw since the Stadion Narodowy was not ready. It has been used by Lechia Gdańsk since 'the White-and-Green' relocated there from the Gdańsk Sports Center Stadium.

The stadium was also one of the designated venues for the finals of UEFA Euro 2012. It hosted four matches during the tournament; three matches in Group C and one quarter-final match were played there. It was originally scheduled to host the 2020 UEFA Europa League Final. However, following the COVID-19 pandemic in Europe, the final was postponed and later rescheduled to August at the RheinEnergieStadion in Germany behind closed doors; Gdańsk hosted the 2021 final instead. Villarreal won the match, defeating Manchester United 11–10 on the penalty shootout after the game ended in a 1–1 draw.

== Stadium characteristics ==
=== Overall ===
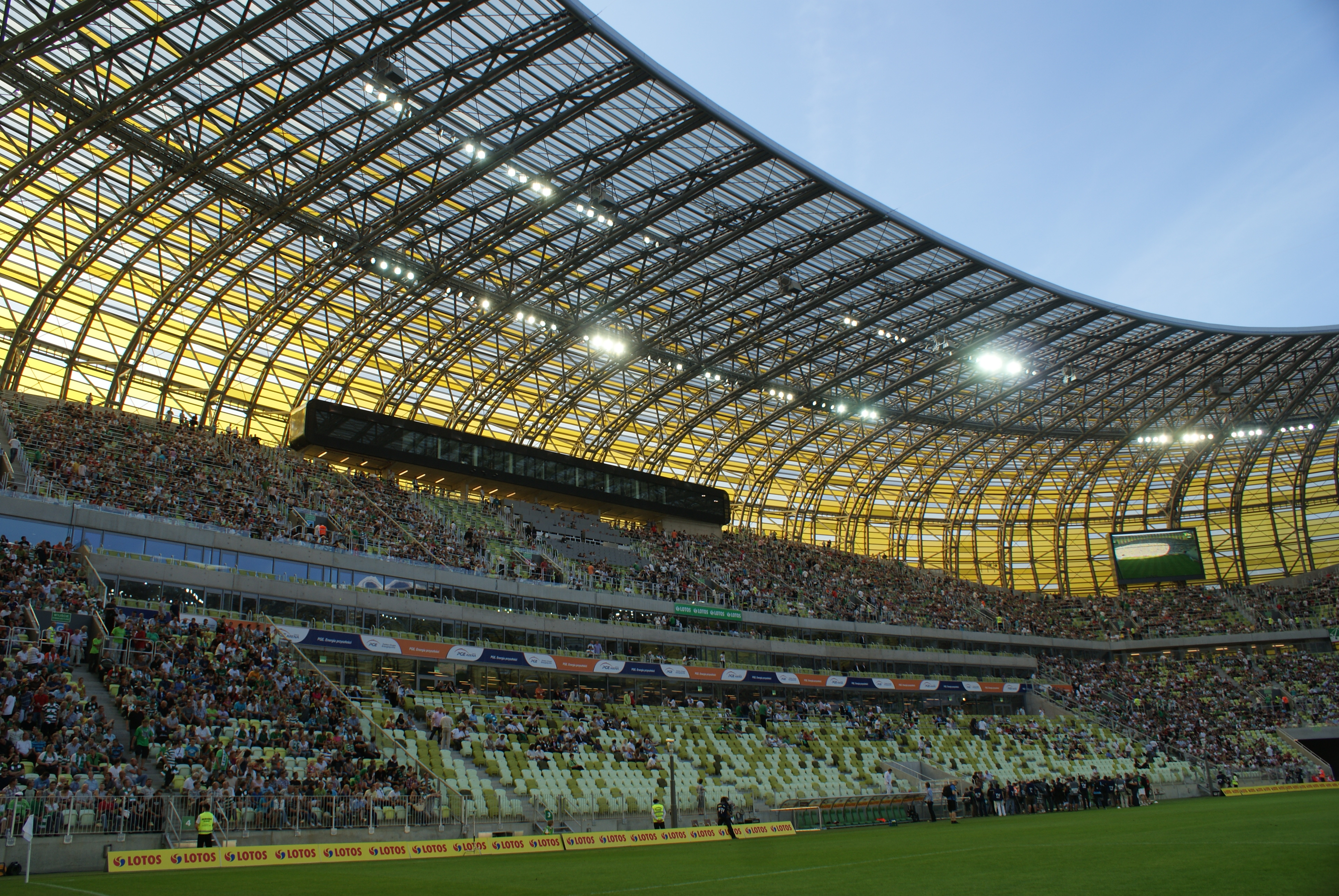
Main stand before inaugural match

The stadium measures some 236 metres long, 203 metres wide and 45 metres high.

The arena's exterior is designed to resemble amber which has long been extracted on the Baltic coast. Whole roof construction is based on 82 girders. Roof structure has a total area of 44 000 m^{2}. The facade and the roof are covered with 18 000 plates of polycarbonate multiwall sheet, in 6 shades, with a total area of 4.5 hectares. Two logos (placed on the western and eastern side of the stadium), are made in LED technology, with a height of 8 meters and length of 35 meters.

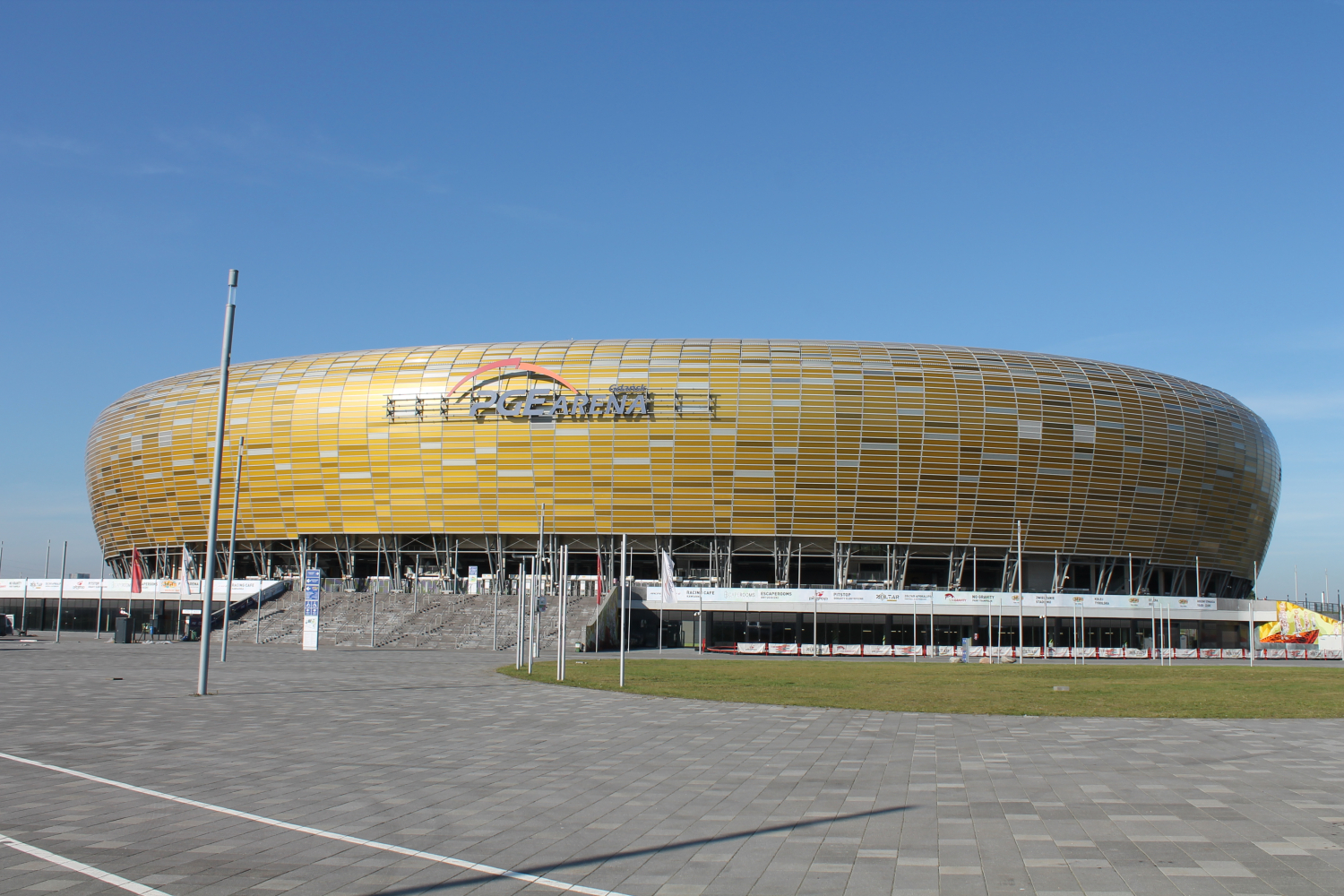
Main entrance

The pitch has dimensions of 105x68 meters, and its distance from the grandstand is 10.5 m behind the goals, and 8.5 m from the sidelines. The grandstands under the standards of FIFA and UEFA are covered, the center which is hovering over the field however will be uncovered. The issue of installing a sliding roof was considered, but the idea was abandoned due to costs and limited time to complete the construction. Remaining space is reserved for the other participants of the event (staff, etc.). The stadium meets the criteria for UEFA Category 4.

=== Capacity ===
Stadium capacity is 43,615 seats during league matches. However the total number of seats (gross) is approximately 44,000. During the UEFA European Football Championship in 2012 capacity was reduced to approximately 40 000 seats.

At the stadium there are 40 boxes behind glass where full catering is provided (so-called sky-boxes). Eight of them have an area of 60 m^{2} (646 ft^{2}) and the remaining 32 have an area of 30 m^{2} (323 ft^{2}). In addition to the sky-boxes, stadium offers 1383 seats of higher standard (VIP places) for the more affluent guests. Each of them is equipped with a comfortable seat and located just below the sky-boxes. Both sky-boxes and VIP places have a separate entrance with dedicated foyer.

The seats were provided by Polish company Forum Seating belonging to the Nowy Styl Group located in Krosno. Moreover, the stadium has 50 extra seats for disabled persons.

=== Name ===
In December 2009, the stadium's name was purchased by the Polish Energy Group (PGE) for 35 million złoty (about 8.5 million euro) for a duration of five years. The city of Gdańsk sold the naming rights in order to cover some of the costs of its construction. The only stipulation was that the name must include the word "Arena". The oil company Lotos and power company PGE were the final competitors for the sponsorship contract which also includes the display of the firm's logo in at least two locations at the top of the stadium, along with internal advertisements. The stadium was originally known as the Baltic Arena. The contract with PGE ended, however, on 30 September 2015, after PGE chose not to renew the contract. On 9 November 2015 Energa SA was revealed as the new stadium's sponsor until 2020. On 7 November 2020, The management board of Arena Gdańsk Operator sp.z o.o. announced the end of cooperation with Energa SA. From 21 May 2021, the stadium is called Polsat Plus Arena Gdańsk. The city's contract with the media and telecommunications companies Polsat and Plus was concluded for 6 years.

- Baltic Arena (during construction)
- PGE Arena Gdańsk (July 2010 – October 2015)
- Arena Gdańsk (UEFA Euro 2012)
- Stadion w Gdańsku Letnicy (October 2015 – November 2015)
- Stadion Energa Gdańsk (November 2015 – November 2020)
- Stadion w Gdańsku Letnicy (November 2020 – May 2021)
- Polsat Plus Arena Gdańsk (May 2021 – present)

=== T29 Sports Bar & Restaurant ===
On 20 January 2012 after several months of preparation, a special club bar named T29 Sports Bar & Restaurant was opened to the public. The venue's name is in reference to the previous Lechia Gdańsk stadium's address: Traugutta 29. Its interior design draws on events from the club's history. The most distinctive parts of the design are two murals located opposite to each other on the sidewalls of the venue. Both paintings show an artistic interpretation of the panorama of the old Lechia stadium. T29 Sports Bar & Restaurant is situated in the north part of the stadium, just below the visiting team's supporters sector. The pub is a two-level construction with the total area of 800m2. There are 39' TV sets located on both stories of the venue. Every match of Lechia Gdańsk and other important sports events (incl. matches of Polish Ekstraklasa) are broadcast there every day. T29 Sports Bar & Restaurant is open for the visitors 7 days a week.

== Construction history ==
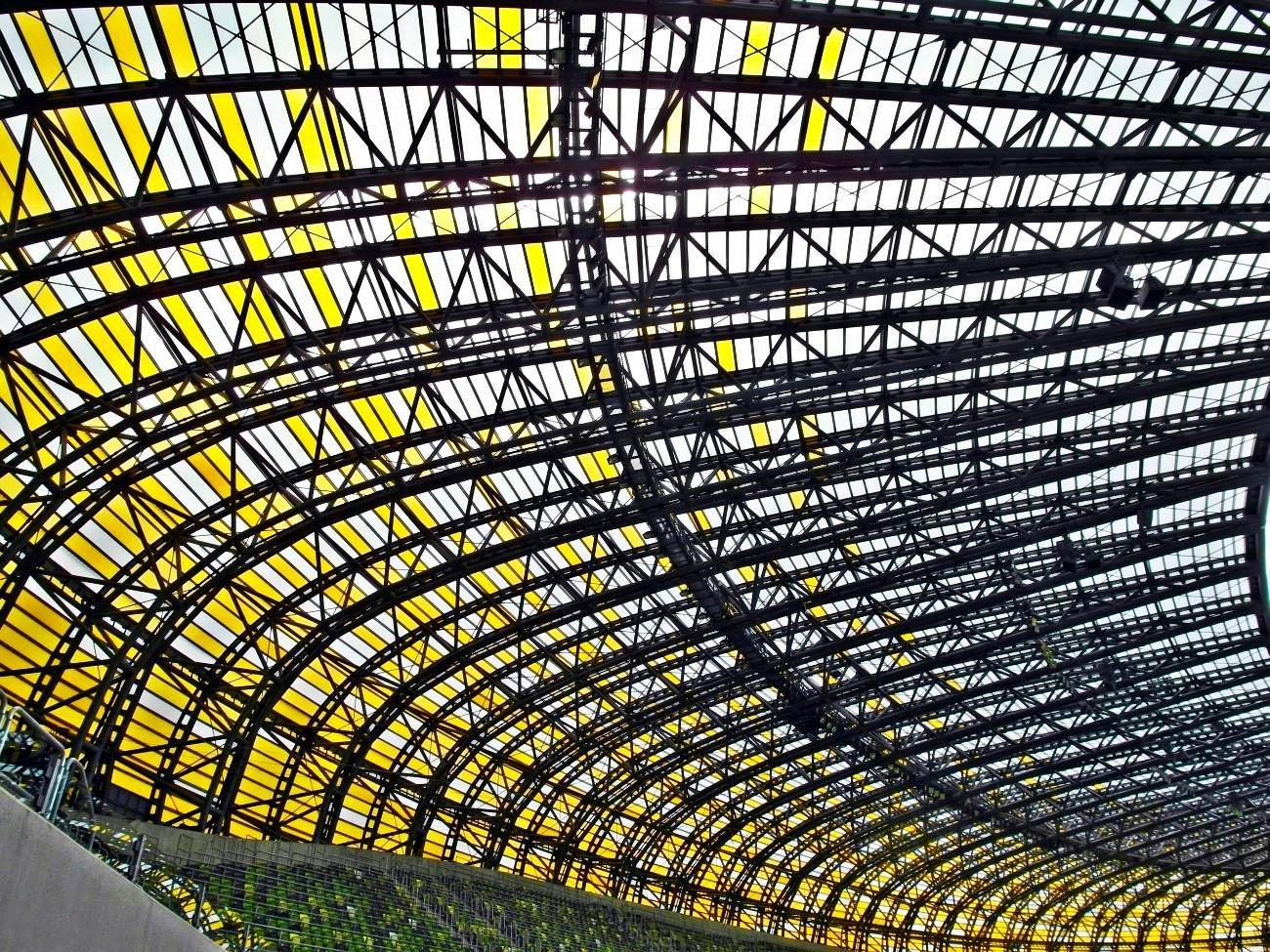
Facade of the stadium built with polycarbonate modules

The stadium was built specifically for the UEFA European Football Championship, which was held in 2012 in Poland and Ukraine. The first conceptual design of the stadium has been presented by the city of Gdańsk before the tournament host's choice. On 31 January 2008 architect who had designed the stadium was selected. It was a company of Rhode-Kellermann-Wawrowsky from Düsseldorf, which designed such stadiums like Veltins-Arena in Gelsenkirchen and the AWD-Arena in Hannover. First part of construction documents were consisted of 92 volumes and the second one included next 137 volumes. Stadium specialist HPP Architects from Düsseldorf also contributed to the design development.

On 2 April 2008, work began on preparing the ground for the construction of the stadium, including liquidation of allotments, felling of trees and shrubs. On 15 December 2008 work started on the ground exchange and density of land for the construction of the stadium.

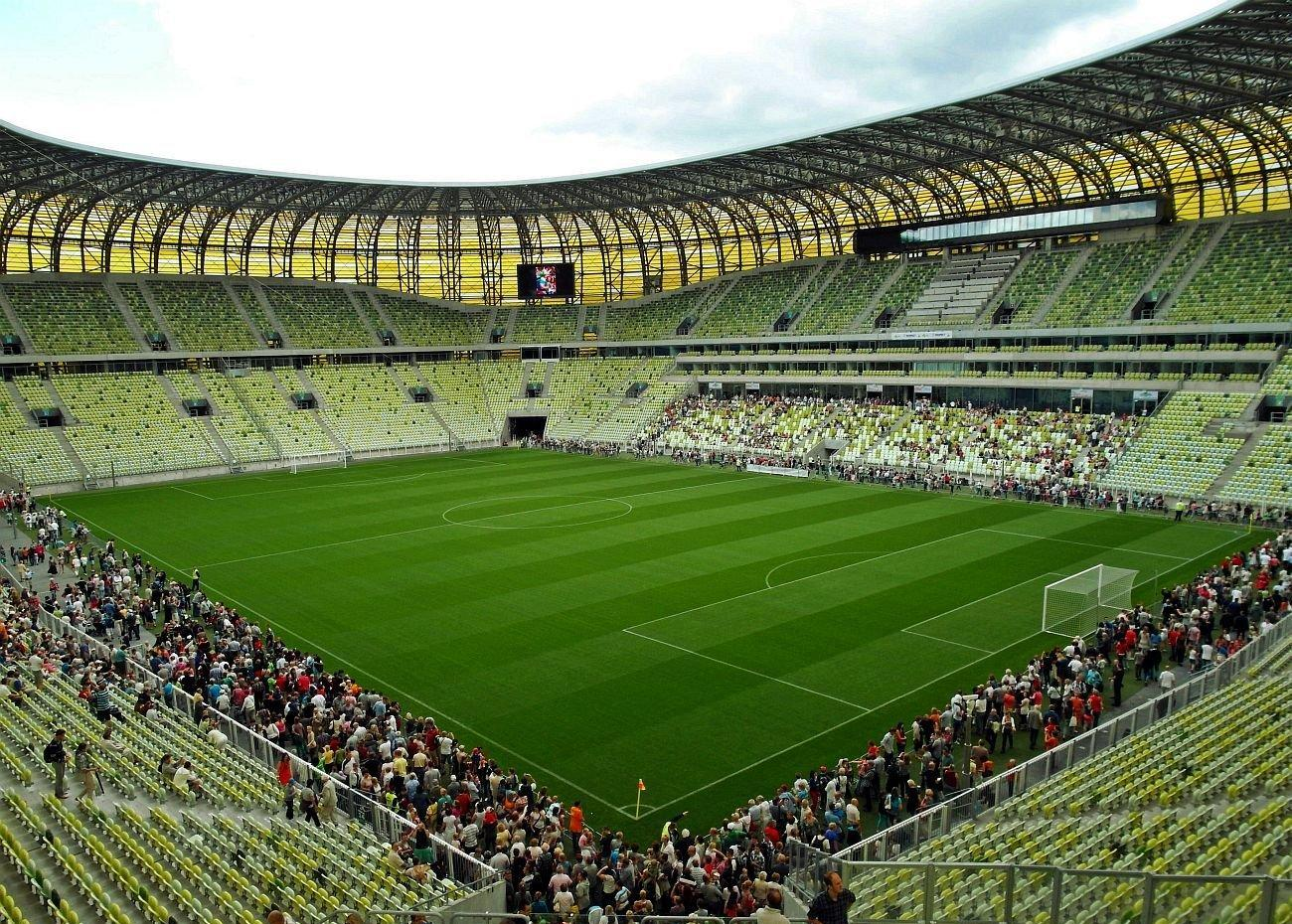
Gdańsk City Stadium interior

The official opening of the offers from companies willing to build new stadium took place on 25 March 2009. The offers prices varies form about 522 mln zł to 635 mln zł. Two days later a contract with the company who introduced the cheapest offer was signed. It was a consortium of companies: Hydrobudowa Polska S.A, Hydrobudowa 9, Alpine Bau Deutschland AG Berlin, Alpine Bau GmbH Austria, Alpine Construction Polska Sp. z o.o.

On 28 May 2009 when the main construction began. In mid-July the cornerstone was laid. Within the next year main steel and concrete structure was completed and the ceremony of topping out took place at 24 July 2010.

The original date of completion of the stadium was the end of 2010. On 9 June 2011, a match between the national teams of Poland and France was planned. Due to security reasons, the match was moved to Warsaw.

The stadium was opened at 19 July 2011. The first official football event on PGE Arena Gdańsk, as the Gdańsk City Stadium was then known, took place on 14 August 2011. The match between Lechia Gdańsk and Cracovia ended in 1–1 draw and the first goalscorer at the new stadium was Fred Benson.

== Location & transport ==
The stadium is located in the northern part of the city, across the Martwa Wisła River, in the Letnica district. The main entrance is located on the side of newly created ul. Pokoleń Lechii Gdańsk (Generations of Lechia Gdańsk street).

Main roads that leading to the stadium are the ul. Marynarki Polskiej ("Polish Navy street") and the ul. Uczniowska. Getting to the stadium is easily possible by public transport, mainly due to tram lines # 7, 10 leading to tram stops Mostostal and Stadion or bus lines # 158, 283 leading to the bus stop Stadion. Selected courses of bus line # 158 stop along Generations of Lechia Gdańsk street on bus stops AmberExpo and Węzeł Harfa. In match days there are additional tram courses for the football fans.

Moreover, on every match day, special free of charge SKM (Fast Urban Railway) line leads from Gdańsk Główny railway station to Gdańsk Stadium Expo station located near the stadium. This line was modernized especially for the UEFA European Football Championship in 2012. It has been used for the first time, before and after the Ekstraklasa match between Lechia Gdańsk and Legia Warszawa which took place on May 3, 2012. This line is also available for passengers in the days when the trade exhibition takes place in the new headquarters of the MTG SA Gdańsk International Fair Co. located next to the Gdańsk City Stadium.

== Euro 2012 matches ==
The stadium was one of the venues for the UEFA Euro 2012. The three group C matches involving Spain were played there (with the other matches in that group played at City Stadium, Poznań), as well as one quarterfinal. During the finals, it was known as the 'Arena Gdansk' for sponsorship reasons.

The following matches were played at the stadium during the UEFA Euro 2012:

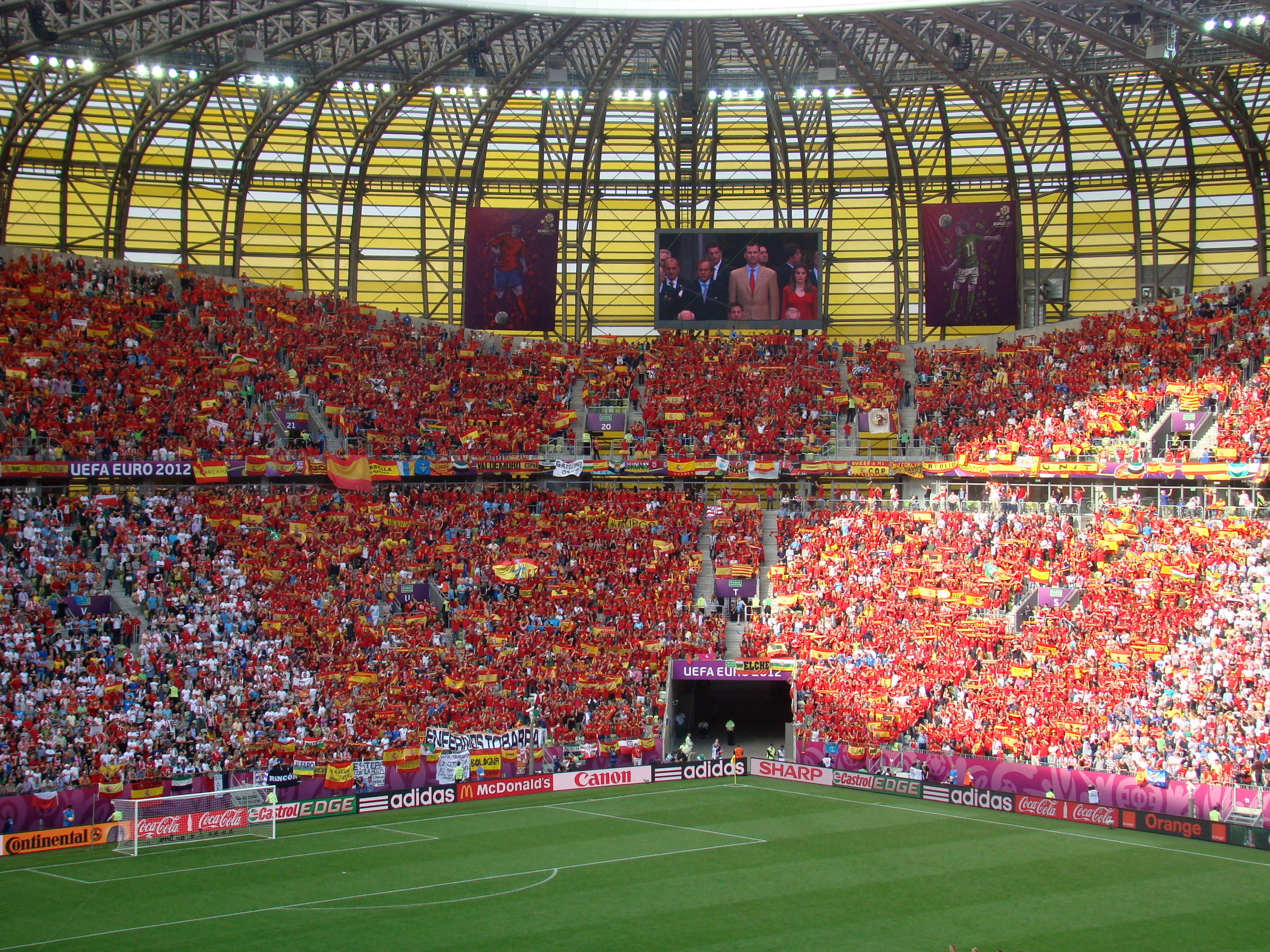
Spanish supporters during the opening match of the stadium at Euro 2012, Spain vs Italy.

Date	Time (CEST)	Team #1	Result	Team #2	Round	Scored
10 June 2012	18:00	Spain	1–1	Italy	Group C	Antonio Di Natale 61'; Cesc Fàbregas 64'
14 June 2012	20:45	Spain	4–0	Republic of Ireland	Group C	Fernando Torres 4',70'; David Silva 49'; Cesc Fàbregas 83'
18 June 2012	20:45	Croatia	0–1	Spain	Group C	Jesús Navas 88'
22 June 2012	20:45	Germany	4–2	Greece	Quarter-finals	Philipp Lahm 39'; Georgios Samaras 55'; Sami Khedira 61'; Miroslav Klose 68'; Marco Reus 74'; Dimitris Salpingidis 89' (pen.)

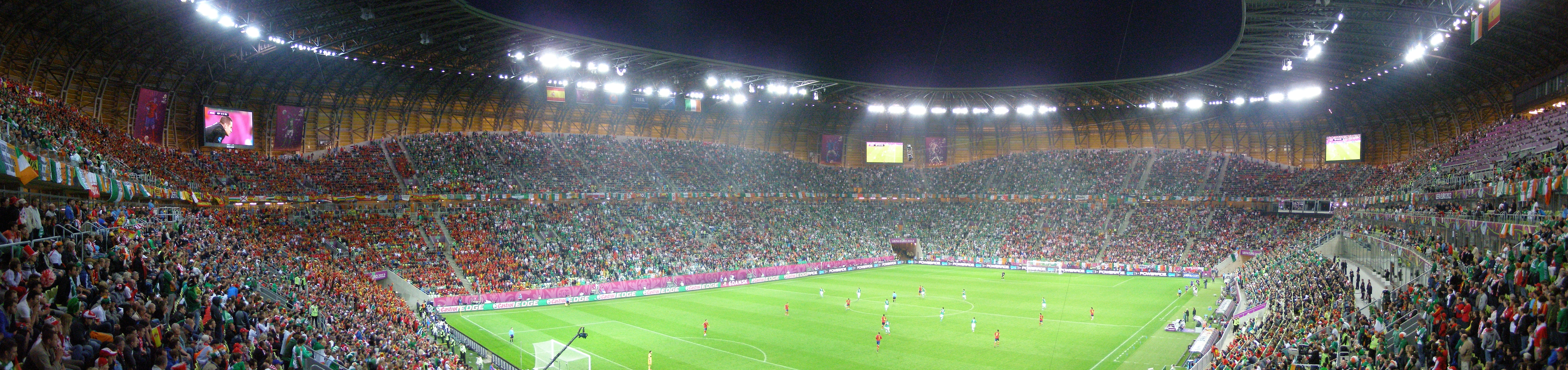
A Panorama view of the Gdańsk City Stadium - UEFA Euro 2012 - Group C Match - Spain vs Republic of Ireland

== Poland national football team matches ==
So far, Poland national football team has played 10 matches in the arena. The stadium's opening match was due to be played against the French on 9 June 2011, but was moved to the Stadion Wojska Polskiego, as the stadium wasn't fully prepared. Instead, the match against Germany, which had been scheduled to be played at the Stadion Narodowy was moved to Gdansk (due to the fact that the stadium in Warsaw wasn't complete). In the first game for stakes played in Gdańsk, Poland drew 0–0 with Italy on 11 October 2020.

Nr	Competition	Date	Opponent	Result	Attendance	Scorers for Poland
1	Friendly	6 September 2011	Germany	2–2	38,000	Robert Lewandowski, Jakub Błaszczykowski
2	Friendly	14 November 2012	Uruguay	1–3	39,460	Ludovic Obraniak
3	Friendly	14 August 2013	Denmark	3–2	34,952	Mateusz Klich, Waldemar Sobota, Piotr Zieliński
4	Friendly	6 June 2014	Lithuania	2–1	33,074	Arkadiusz Milik, Robert Lewandowski
5	Friendly	16 June 2015	Greece	0–0	37,192	–––
6	Friendly	1 June 2016	Netherlands	1–2	40,392	Artur Jędrzejczyk
7	Friendly	13 November 2017	Mexico	0–1	32,736	–––
8	Friendly	15 November 2018	Czech Republic	0–1	23,851	–––
9	Friendly	7 October 2020	Finland	5–1	3,000	Kamil Grosicki (3), Krzysztof Piątek, Arkadiusz Milik
10	2020–21 UEFA Nations League	11 October 2020	Italy	0–0	7,000	–––

== Poland women's national football team matches ==
On 17 September 2021, Stadion Gdańsk hosted its first game played by the Poland women's national football team, a 2023 FIFA World Cup qualification match against Belgium. A 1–1 draw was spectated by 8,011 people, breaking the then-record for the highest attendance during the biało-czerwone's home fixture.

In August 2024, the Polish Football Association signed a three-year deal with the stadium's owners and operators to establish it as the home venue of the Poland women's team.

Nr	Competition	Date	Opponent	Result	Attendance	Scorers for Poland
1	2023 FIFA World Cup qualification	17 September 2021	Belgium	1–1	8,011	Ewa Pajor
2	UEFA Euro 2025 qualifying play-offs	29 October 2024	Romania	4–1	8,449	Ewa Pajor (2), Natalia Padilla, Nadia Krezyman
3	UEFA Euro 2025 qualifying play-offs	29 November 2024	Austria	1–0	7,025	Natalia Padilla
4	2025 UEFA Nations League	21 February 2025	Northern Ireland	2–0	2,700	Ewelina Kamczyk, Adriana Achcińska
5	2025 UEFA Nations League	4 April 2025	Bosnia and Herzegovina	5–1	5,027	Ewa Pajor (2), Adriana Achcińska, Klaudia Słowińska, Martyna Wiankowska
6	2025 UEFA Nations League	3 June 2025	Romania	3–0	10,685	Ewelina Kamczyk (2), Paulina Tomasiak
7	Friendly	24 October 2025	Netherlands	0–0	11,022	–––
8	Friendly	28 October 2025	Slovenia	1–0	3,501	Weronika Zawistowska
9	2027 FIFA Women's World Cup qualification	3 March 2026	Netherlands	2–2	3,540	Ewa Pajor, Paulina Tomasiak
10	2027 FIFA Women's World Cup qualification	14 April 2026	Republic of Ireland	2–3	4,270	Tanja Pawollek, Ewa Pajor
11	2027 FIFA Women's World Cup qualification	5 June 2026	France	0–2	11,713	–––

== Concerts ==
Concerts at Gdańsk City Stadium
Date	Artist	Tour	Attendance
27 September 2012	Jennifer Lopez	Dance Again World Tour	34,068
19 June 2013	Bon Jovi	Because We Can	31,167
19 August 2014	Justin Timberlake	The 20/20 Experience World Tour	40,794
15 July 2016	Avicii, Felix Jaehn, Modestep, Tom Swoon, Warson, Widenski, & Mafia Mike	Music Power Explosion	24,000
20 June 2017	Guns N' Roses	Not in This Lifetime... Tour	40,571
4 June 2022	Dawid Podsiadło		40,000
12–13 July 2024	Ed Sheeran	+–=÷× Tour	104,804

== Religious conventions ==
Religious conventions at Gdańsk City Stadium
Date	Religious denomination	Title	Attendance
9–11 August 2019	Jehovah's Witnesses	“Love Never Fails”! Convention	14,410

== Controversies ==
=== Seat colour ===
Along initial design by Rhode-Kellermann-Wawrowsky, all seats were to create a mosaic of yellow and orange in various tones, which was to match the 'amber' facades and roof. However, after the final proposed layout was presented, Lechia Gdansk supporters launched a protest to block the move. As they argued, the stadium should be associated with their club's colours, not those of the arch-rival Arka Gdynia, who aren't tenants at the stadium. In a move to satisfy these claims, architects were asked to rethink the colors and came up with various tones of green. This was accepted by supporters and stayed intact with the overall concept as amber can also be greenish (though not usually found on Polish shores, more common in the Caribbean). Later, in October 2012, some seats were also painted white to read "LECHIA GDAŃSK" in order to allow fans to identify with the venue more.

=== Ban on bananas ===
In July 2012, the stadium became Poland's only (and probably one of very few worldwide) to have bananas on the list of items prohibited inside. The decision was made by Lechia Gdansk safety manager in order to prevent racist incidents. In April of that year, two black players of Lechia had bananas thrown at them.

== See also ==
- Gdańsk Lech Wałęsa Airport
- A1 motorway
- List of football stadiums in Poland
- Lists of stadiums

Preceded by RheinEnergieStadion; Cologne	UEFA Europa League; Final venue 2021	Succeeded by Ramón Sánchez Pizjuán Stadium; Seville
