= 2024–25 Croatian Women's Football Cup =

Croatian women's football cup season

2024–25 Croatian Cup
Tournament details
- Country: Croatia
- Dates: 1 September 2024 – 21 May 2025
- Teams: 22

Final positions
- Champions: Osijek

Tournament statistics
- Matches played: 21
- Goals scored: 103 (4.9 per match)
- Top goal scorer(s): (Montenegro) Jasna Đoković (7 goals)
- All statistics correct as of 21 May 2025. Goals scored in penalty shoot-outs not included.

The 2024–25 season of the Croatian Cup (HNKŽ) is the 24th edition of the Croatian domestic women's football cup competition.

Dinamo Zagreb are the defending champions, having won their first title in the 2023–24 season.

The calendar for the 2024–25 season has been published in the HNS newsletter from 21 August 2024. The competition opened on 1 September 2024 with five matches of the six-match preliminary round. The final match is scheduled for 11 June 2025.

== Teams ==
Teams competing in the Prva HNLŽ and Druga HNLŽ are required to participate in the cup, but the registration is open to any other teams meeting the requirements. No teams outside of the two top tiers of women's league registered for the 2024–25 season, and the cup is thus contested by 22 teams. (Note: Druga Liga group B is only contested by 7 teams in the 2024–25 season.) (Note: Reserve teams are not eligible, the Druga Liga group B Osijek II is therefore not participating.)

| Prva HNLŽ | Druga HNLŽ | |
|---|---|---|
| The 8 teams competing in the 2024–25 season. | The 8 teams competing in the 2024–25 group A. | 6 of the 7 teams competing in the 2024–25 group B. |
| Agram; Dinamo Zagreb; Gorica; Hajduk Split; Međimurje Čakovec; Neretva; Osijek; Split | Donat; ŠNK Frankopan; Istra 1961; Karlovac 1919; NK Sesvetski Kraljevec; Pregrada; Rijeka; Siget | Graničar Županja; Koprivnica; Marsonia; Slavonija Požega; Višnjevac; Vukovar 1991 |

== Preliminary round ==
The Druga HNLŽ teams compete in a preliminary round for (unseeded) spots in the first round. Since there are only 14 Druga HNLŽ teams participating in the 2024–25 season, and there are 8 unseeded spots in the first round, only six matches take place. Donat (relegated from Prva HNLŽ in the 2023–24 season) and Višnjevac (The 2023–24 champions of Druga HNLŽ group B) were given a bye. The matchups draw is biased by geographical proximity, in order to alleviate the economic burden on the participating clubs.

| 1 September 2024 | Pregrada | 0–8 | Koprivnica | Pregrada |
| 13:00 CEST (UTC+2) | | Report | Videc 33', 40'; Fučkar 48', 59', 67'; Galović 54', 88'; Vuljak 83' | Stadium: Nogometno igralište Pregrada; Attendance: 100; Referee: Ivan Slunjski |

| 1 September 2024 | ŠNK Frankopan | 2–4 | NK Sesvetski Kraljevec | Sisak |
| 17:00 CEST (UTC+2) | Miočinović 38'; Deligegić 58' | Report | Šuster 1'; Tutić 12'; Kovačević 53', 70' | Stadium: Nogometno igralište Galdovo; Attendance: 70; Referee: Vlatko Mlinarić |

| 1 September 2024 | Vukovar 1991 | 0–3 | Slavonija Požega | Vukovar |
| 17:00 CEST (UTC+2) | | Report | Draguljić 49', 77'; Jozić 70' (o.g.) | Stadium: Gradski stadion Vukovar; Attendance: 50; Referee: Oliver Romić |

| 1 September 2024 | Istra 1961 | 3–2 | Rijeka | Medulin |
| 18:00 CEST (UTC+2) | Šipura 17', 31'; Oto 24' | Report | Martinović 61', 65' | Stadium: Sport Centar Arena; Attendance: 30; Referee: Daniel Starčević |

| 1 September 2024 | Marsonia | 1–4 | Graničar Županja | Slavonski Brod |
| 18:00 CEST (UTC+2) | Vuković 33' | Report | Jelić 13'; Krištić 38'; Živković 69'; Krištić 85' | Stadium: Stadion uz Savu; Attendance: 20; Referee: Petar Madžarević |

| BB | Karlovac 1919 | 0-3 | Siget |
| CEST (UTC+2) |

== Round 1 ==
Teams competing in Prva HNLŽ are seeded in round 1.

| 29 September 2024 | Slavonija Požega | 0-9 | Osijek |
| CEST (UTC+2) |

| 29 September 2024 | Istra 1961 | 0-5 | Dinamo Zagreb |
| CEST (UTC+2) |

| 2 October 2024 | Donat | 0–4 | Hajduk Split | Zadar |
| 15:00 | | Report | Bakalar 45'; Grebenar 56', 61'; Bagarić 70' | Stadium: ŠC Višnjik; Attendance: 50; Referee: Mateo Erceg |

| 30 October 2024 | Neretva | 0-3 | Split |
| CEST (UTC+2) |

| 29 September 2024 | Siget | 0-1 | Gorica |
| CEST (UTC+2) |

| 29 September 2024 | Koprivnica | 0-10 | Međimurje Čakovec |
| CEST (UTC+2) |

| 29 September 2024 | Graničar Županja | 0-2 | Višnjevac |
| CEST (UTC+2) |

| 29 September 2024 | NK Sesvetski Kraljevec | 0-13 | Agram |
| CEST (UTC+2) |

== Round 2 (quarter-finals) ==
| 2 March 2025 | Agram | 5-0 | Split |
| CET (UTC+1) |

| 6 November 2024 | Međimurje Čakovec | 8-0 | Gorica |
| CET (UTC+1) |

| 20 November 2024 | Dinamo Zagreb | 0–0 (5–6 p) | Hajduk Split | Zagreb |
| 17:45 | | Report | | Stadium: Stadion Maksimir; Attendance: 50; Referee: Davor Ješić |
| | Penalties |
| | Spajić (penalty scored); Bartolović (penalty scored); Kopić (penalty scored); Stanić (penalty scored); Taritaš (penalty scored); Petarić (penalty missed) | | (penalty scored) Grebenar; (penalty scored) Bukač; (penalty scored) Kukavica; (penalty scored) Vlajčević; (penalty scored) Mišura; (penalty scored) Dubravica |

| 20 November 2024 | Višnjevac | 0-2 | Osijek |
| CET (UTC+1) |

== Round 3 (semi-finals) ==
| 24 April 2025 | Hajduk Split | 3–2 | Agram | Split |
| 15:00 | Grebenar 31', 45+2'; Čanjevac 51' | Report | Joščak 76'; Đoković 82' | Stadium: Stadion Poljud; Attendance: 120; Referee: Matej Čulina |

| 7 May 2025 | Osijek | 2-0 | Međimurje Čakovec |
| 16:00 |

== Final ==
21 May 2025
17:00

| Hajduk Split | 2–2 | Osijek |
|---|---|---|
| Grebenar 4'; Bagarić 15' | Report | Brnić 48' (o.g.); Bednárová 50' |
Penalties
| Bakalar (penalty missed); Bukač (penalty scored); Kukavica (penalty missed); Grebenar (penalty scored); Dulčić (penalty scored); Pedić (penalty scored); Ristovski (penalty missed) | 4–5 | (penalty missed) Živković; (penalty scored) Petković; (penalty scored) Maričić; (penalty missed) Đukić; (penalty scored) Porter; (penalty scored) Cox; (penalty scored) Ivanova |

Stadion Kamen Ingrad, Velika
Attendance: 600
Referee: Filip Dragašević
