= 2023–24 Croatian Women's Football Cup =

Tournament details
- Country: Croatia
- Dates: 24 September 2023 – 22 June 2024
- Teams: 21

Final positions
- Champions: Dinamo Zagreb (1st title)
- Runner-up: Osijek

Tournament statistics
- Matches played: 19
- Goals scored: 82 (4.32 per match)
- Top goal scorer(s): Lorena Balić (7)

The 2023–24 Croatian Women's Football Cup was the 33rd season of the annual Croatian football cup competition. Twenty one team participated in the competition, all eight teams from the 2023–24 Croatian Women's First Football League and all teams from the second level. The competition started on 24 September 2023 and ended on 22 June 2024.

== Matches ==
=== Preliminary round ===
24 September 2023	Graničar Županja	1–2	Višnjevac	Županja
10:00	Knežević 47'	Report	Ahmeti 40', 67'

24 September 2023	Pregrada	3–4	Sesvetski Kraljevec	Pregrada
11:30	Šćukanec-Hopinski 5', 48'; Hanžek 78'	Report	Šuster 16', 54'; Tutić 39'; Perica 75'

24 September 2023	Siget	1–0	Istra 1961	Zagreb
13:30	Dunić 90'	Report

24 September 2023	Vrčevo	1–3	Neretva	Glavica
16:00	Števanja 74'	Report	Vidaković 13', 45'; Kapitanović 84'

24 September 2023	Mikanovci	1–4	Slavonija Požega	Stari Mikanovci
21:15	Ilić 56'	Report	Draguljić 3', 24'; Grgić 50', 60'

=== Round of 16 ===
22 November 2023	Viktorija	0–11	Osijek	Slavonski Brod
18:00		Report	Joščak 2', 70', 76'; Barišić 23'; Balić 29', 32', 41'; Bulut 65'; Maričić 72'; Žuljević 73'; Damjanović 80'

26 November 2023	Neretva	0–3	Dinamo Zagreb	Metković
12:00		Report	Zdunić 7', 60'; Sarkanaitė 45'

26 November 2023	Slavonija Požega	0–1	Međimurje Čakovec	Mihaljevci
13:30		Report	Kuzmić 33'

26 November 2023	Siget	0–5	Hajduk Split	Zagreb
14:00		Report	Vlastelica 9'; Bakalar 18'; Čanjevac 39'; Kukavica 42'; Vlajčević 72'

26 November 2023	Rijeka	1–3	Agram	Rijeka
14:30	Petrović 38'	Report	Pazarac 6', 29'; Jakobašić 25'	Stadium: Stadion Kantrida

9 March 2024	Višnjevac	0–2	Donat	Višnjevac
15:30		Report	Bulum 13', 81'

10 March 2024	Sesvetski Kraljevec	1–5	Split	Sesvetski Kraljevec
15:00	Urović 50'	Report	Rusković 9'; Lozić 64', 87'; Skenderi 69'; Dujmović 86'

10 March 2024	Koprivnica	0–5	Gorica	Koprivnica
15:00		Report	Cicijelj 1', 66'; Đukić 19'; Vuljak 47' (o.g.); Štimac 63'

=== Quarter-finals ===
17 March 2024	Split	0–3 (Note: Split originally won the game 1–0 but was later awarded as a 3–0 forfeit win for Agram); Awarded	Agram	Split
14:00	Đoković 51'	Report

17 March 2024	Dinamo Zagreb	4–1	Međimurje Čakovec	Zagreb
14:00	Jyoti 3'; Petarić 59', 85'; Stančić 90'	Report	Vujević 37'

17 March 2024	Donat	0–5	Gorica	Zadar
15:00		Report	Cicijelj 12', 20', 62'; Miočinović 14'; Klarić 74'

17 March 2024	Hajduk Split	0–3	Osijek	Split
15:00		Report	Balić 26'; Živković 42'; Nevrkla 48'

=== Semi-finals ===
16 June 2024	Osijek	8–0	Agram	Osijek
17:00	Balić 13', 20', 43'; Lojna 36', 47', 51'; Barišić 64'; Živković 79'	Report		Stadium: Stadion Gradski vrt

16 June 2024	Dinamo Zagreb	2–0	Gorica	Zagreb
17:00	Spajić 68'; Kashmina 72'	Report		Stadium: Stadion Maksimir

=== Final ===
22 June 2024
18:00

Osijek	1–1	Dinamo Zagreb
Damjanović 36'	Report	Zdunić 23'
Penalties
Lojna (penalty scored); Balić (penalty missed); Lubina (penalty scored); Joščak (penalty scored); Živković (penalty scored); Pernar (penalty missed); Bulut (penalty missed)	4–5	(penalty missed) Zdunić; (penalty scored) Spajić; (penalty scored) Bartolović; (penalty scored) Jyoti; (penalty scored) Stanić; (penalty missed) Grdiša; (penalty scored) Kashmina

Stadion SRC Mladost, Čakovec
