= Iva Landeka =

Croatian football midfielder (born 1989)

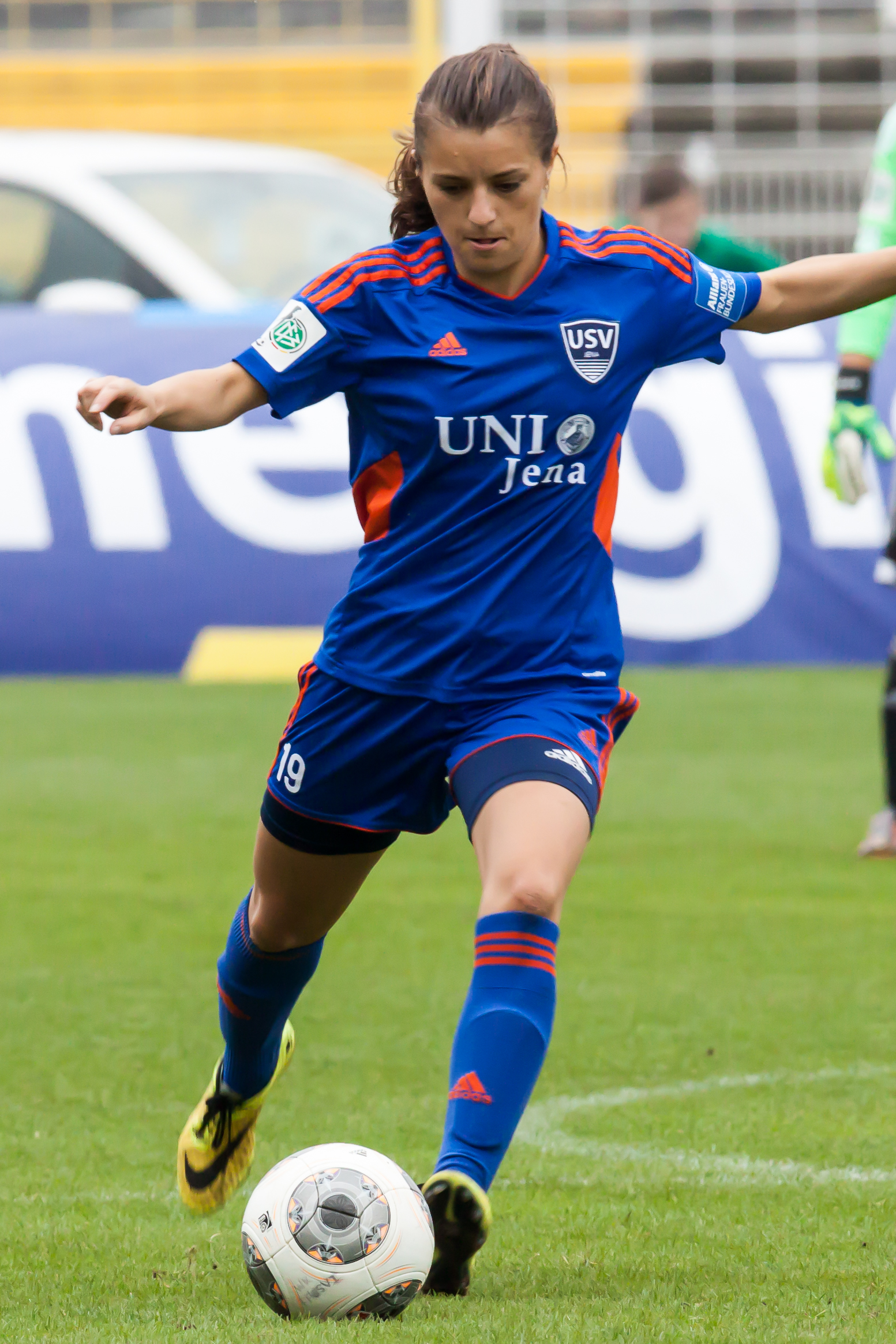
- Landeka in 2014

Personal information
- Full name: Iva Landeka
- Date of birth: 3 October 1989 (age 37)
- Place of birth: Posušje, SR Bosnia and Herzegovina, SFR Yugoslavia
- Height: 1.67 m (5 ft 6 in)
- Position: Midfielder

Team information
- Current team: ŽNK Split
- Number: 19

Youth career
- ŽNK Marjan

Senior career*
Years	Team	Apps	(Gls)
2005–2008	Dinamo Maksimir		
2008–2011	St. Veit	47	(14)
2011	Unia Racibórz	15	(4)
2012–2016	USV Jena	94	(13)
2016–2019	FC Rosengård	49	(12)
2019–2022	Montpellier	52	(3)
2022–	ŽNK Split		

International career
2006–2022	Croatia	102	(14)
- * Club domestic league appearances and goals as of 21:28, 26 November 2024 (UTC)

Iva Lažeta (née Landeka; born 3 October 1989) is a Croatian footballer who plays as a midfielder for ŽNK Split. From 2012 until 2016 she played for USV Jena of the German Bundesliga. She previously played for Dinamo Maksimir in the Croatian 1st Division, FC Kärnten in the Austrian Frauenliga and Unia Racibórz in the Polish Ekstraliga, also playing the Champions League with Dinamo and Unia. She is a member of the Croatian national team since 2006.

== Early life ==
Landeka was born in the town of Posušje, Bosnia and Herzegovina, SFR Yugoslavia. She left for Zagreb when she was 14 years old, to pursue her football career.

== Club career ==
In August 2016, Swedish champions FC Rosengård announced that they had agreed to sign Landeka from USV Jena on a two-year contract. Rosengård's sporting director Therese Sjögran said that Landeka was not intended as a direct replacement for the outgoing Sara Björk Gunnarsdóttir, who was a more defensive midfielder.

== International career ==
Goals scored for the Croatian WNT in official competitions
Competition	Stage	Date	Location	Opponent	Goals	Result	Overall
2009 UEFA Euro	Qualifiers	2006–11–18	Adana	Georgia	2	6–0	3
2009 UEFA Euro	Qualifiers	2006–11–20	Adana	Turkey	1	2–1	3
2011 FIFA World Cup	Qualifiers	2010–08–25	Belfast	Northern Ireland	1	1–3	1
2015 FIFA World Cup	Qualifiers	2014–05–08	Ptuj	Slovenia	1	3–0	1
2017 UEFA Euro	Qualifiers	2015–09–17	Erzurum	Turkey	1	4–1	1

== Honours ==
Unia Racibórz

- Ekstraliga: 2010–11
- Polish Cup: 2010–11
