= 2024–25 Croatian Women's First Football League =

Croatian women's football league season

First League
- Season: 2024–25
- Dates: 1 September 2024 – 22 June 2025
- Champions: Agram
- Relegated: Neretva
- Champions League: Agram
- Matches: 94
- Goals: 453 (4.82 per match)
- Top goalscorer: Jasna Đoković (38 goals)
- All statistics correct as of 22 June 2025.

The 2024–25 season of the First League was the 34th edition of the Croatian top-tier women's football league.

Osijek were the defending champions, having won what was already their 25th title in the 2023–24 season.

The calendar for the 2024–25 season was published in the HNS newsletter from 21 August 2024. The first matches were played on 1 September 2024 and the regular season ended on 16 March 2025. The championship round and qualification round followed from 23 March 2025 until 15 June 2025.

The format of the 2024–25 season differed from the previous years, as the championship round was played as a quadruple round-robin tournament, with two home and two away matches against each opponent, as opposed to the double round-robin tournament played in previous seasons. The qualification round remains unchanged.

== Tiebreakers for league ranking ==
Different criteria are applied to determine the order of the teams in all rounds of the league depending on the state of the league.

While a league round is in progress, the order of the teams is determined according to the following criteria:

1. The total number of points;
2. Goal difference in all league matches;
3. Number of goals scored in all league matches;

When a league round has concluded, the order of the teams is determined according to the following criteria:

1. The total number of points;
2. Number of points earned in head-to-head matches;
3. Goal difference in head-to-head matches;
4. Number of away goals scored in head-to-head matches (if two teams are tied), or number of goals scored in head-to-head matches (if three of more teams are tied);
5. Goal difference in all league matches;

If two or more teams are still tied after all the above criteria, a play-off match or tournament is organised to determine the order. Alternatively, if the teams in question ascent, the order is determined by a draw.

== Teams ==
Locations of teams in the 2024–25 Prva HNLŽ.

Team	Home city	Home ground	Capacity	2023–24 finish
Agram	Zagreb	SRC Špansko	1,000	5th
Dinamo Zagreb	Zagreb	Stadion Maksimir	25,912	4th
Gorica	Velika Gorica	Gradski Stadion	4,536	7th
Hajduk Split	Split	Stadion Poljud	33,987	2nd
Međimurje Čakovec	Čakovec	Stadion SRC Mladost	8,000	6th
Neretva	Metković	Iza Vage	3,000	1st (Druga HNLŽ A)
Osijek	Osijek	Gradski Vrt Stadium	18,856	1st
Split	Split	Stadion Park Mladeži	4,075	3rd

=== Team changes ===
Entering league	Exiting league
Promoted from 2023 to 2024 Second League	Relegated to 2024–25 Second League
Neretva	Donat

== Regular season ==
=== League table ===
Pos	Team	Pld	W	D	L	GF	GA	GD	Pts	Qualification
1	Agram	14	12	0	2	69	18	+51	36	Advances to championship round
2	Osijek	14	11	1	2	42	12	+30	34	Advances to championship round
3	Hajduk Split	14	8	3	3	51	17	+34	27	Advances to championship round
4	Međimurje Čakovec	14	8	1	5	49	22	+27	25	Advances to championship round
5	Dinamo Zagreb	14	7	2	5	36	18	+18	23	Participates in qualification round
6	Split	14	2	3	9	16	43	−27	9	Participates in qualification round
7	Gorica	14	2	2	10	20	55	−35	8	Participates in qualification round
8	Neretva	14	0	0	14	9	107	−98	0	Participates in qualification round

Updated to match(es) played on 23 March 2025. Source: HNS.family
Rules for classification: Tiebreakers

=== Results ===
Home \ Away	AGR	DIN	GOR	HAJ	MEĐ	NER	OSI	SPL
Agram		3–1	4–1	4–2	5–1	10–1	3–0	5–0
Dinamo Zagreb	1–5		5–0	1–1	3–1	8–1	1–2	6–0
Gorica	1–11	0–3		0–5	1–2	2–1	1–2	2–2
Hajduk Split	3–1	3–1	5–0		1–1	12–0	4–3	1–1
Međimurje Čakovec	2–3	2–0	8–2	3–1		14–0	0–2	4–0
Neretva	2–12	0–4	1–8	0–9	1–4		0–7	0–5
Osijek	3–0	0–0	4–0	2–1	2–1	7–1		2–0
Split	0–3	0–2	2–2	0–3	1–6	5–1	0–6	

Updated to match(es) played on 23 March 2025. Source: HNS.family
Legend: Blue = home team win; Yellow = draw; Red = away team win.

== Championship round ==
=== League table ===
Pos	Team	Pld	W	D	L	GF	GA	GD	Pts	Qualification
1	Agram (C)	26	22	1	3	111	29	+82	67	Qualification to Champions League first qualifying round
2	Osijek	26	13	4	9	54	37	+17	43	
3	Hajduk Split	26	12	5	9	69	40	+29	41	
4	Međimurje Čakovec	26	11	5	10	67	53	+14	38	

Updated to match(es) played on 22 June 2025. Source: HNS.family
Rules for classification: Tiebreakers
(C) Champions

=== Results ===
==== Rounds 1–6 ====
Home \ Away	AGR	OSI	HAJ	MEĐ
Agram		3–0	1–0	4–2
Osijek	1–2		1–0	1–1
Hajduk Split	2–5	2–0		2–2
Međimurje Čakovec	0–7	1–1	4–1	

Updated to match(es) played on 11 May 2025. Source: HNS.family
Legend: Blue = home team win; Yellow = draw; Red = away team win.

==== Rounds 7–12 ====
Home \ Away	AGR	OSI	HAJ	MEĐ
Agram		4–0	3–0	6–1
Osijek	2–5		2–2	1–2
Hajduk Split	2–1	1–2		5–2
Međimurje Čakovec	1–1	2–1	0–1	

Updated to match(es) played on 22 June 2025. Source: HNS.family
Legend: Blue = home team win; Yellow = draw; Red = away team win.

== Qualification round ==
=== League table ===
Pos	Team	Pld	W	D	L	GF	GA	GD	Pts	Relegation
1	Dinamo Zagreb	20	11	4	5	66	20	+46	37	
2	Split	20	5	4	11	28	56	−28	19	
3	Gorica (O)	20	5	3	12	35	61	−26	18	Participates in relegation play-off
4	Neretva (R)	20	0	0	20	11	145	−134	0	Relegation to 2025–26 Druga HNLŽ

Updated to match(es) played on 18 May 2025. Source: HNS.family
Rules for classification: Tiebreakers
(O) Play-off winners; (R) Relegated

=== Results ===
Home \ Away	DIN	SPL	GOR	NER
Dinamo Zagreb		10–0	1–0	14–0
Split	1–1		1–0	4–0
Gorica	1–1	2–0		4–1
Neretva	0–3	0–5	1–8	

Updated to match(es) played on 18 May 2025. Source: HNS.family
Legend: Blue = home team win; Yellow = draw; Red = away team win.

== Relegation play-off ==
The team that finishes 3rd in the qualification group participates in a two-leg play-off against the loser of the 2024–25 Druga Liga promotion play-off between the winners of the two divisions. The winner earns a spot in the 2025–26 Prva Liga.

Team 1	Agg.	Team 2	1st leg	2nd leg
Gorica	12–0	ŽNK Višnjevac	5–0	7–0

8 June 2025	ŽNK Višnjevac	0–5	Gorica
18:00		Report	Ena Pernar Curić 14'; Andreja Šćukanec-Hopinski 23', 40'; Cassandra Guadelupe Morales 65'; Perica Cicijelj 86'

15 June 2025	Gorica	7–0	ŽNK Višnjevac
17:30	Lucija Vrdoljak 3', 37'; Andreja Šćukanec-Hopinski 6', 25', 38'; Nika Tokić 51'; Perica Cicijelj 75'	Report

== Top scorers ==
As of 22 June 2025

Rank	Player	Club	Goals
1	(Montenegro) Jasna Đoković	Agram	38
2	(Bosnia and Herzegovina) Andrea Grebenar	Hajduk Split	20
3	(Croatia) Marin Hamamoto	Međimurje Čakovec	17
4	(Croatia) Ana Dujmović	Agram	17
5	(Croatia) Andreja Šćukanec-Hopinski	Gorica	16
6	(Croatia) Lorena Balić	Osijek	12
7	(Croatia) Paula Petković	Osijek	12
8	(Croatia) Perica Cicijelj	Gorica	12
9	(Croatia) Ivana Stanić	Dinamo Zagreb	11
10	(Croatia) Paula Škrlec	Međimurje Čakovec	11
11	(Gabon) Vanessa Mazaly	Agram	10
