= 2015–16 Croatian Women's First Football League =

Prva HNLŽ
- Season: 2015–16
- Champions: Osijek
- Relegated: Dinamo-Maksimir
- Champions League: Osijek
- Matches: 90
- Goals: 509 (5.66 per match)
- Top goalscorer: Izabela Lojna (28 goals)
- Biggest home win: Osijek 20–0 Marjan
- Biggest away win: Pregrada 0–15 Osijek
- Highest scoring: Osijek 20–0 Marjan
- All statistics correct as of 22 May 2016.

The 2015–16 Croatian Women's First Football League (Prva hrvatska nogometna liga za žene) was the twenty fifth season of Croatian Women's First Football League, the national championship for women's association football teams in Croatia, since its establishment in 1992.

The league was contested by 10 teams. ŽNK Osijek were the defending champions, having won their nineteenth title in 2014–15.

== Teams ==
Locations of teams in 2015–16 Croatian Women's First Football League

The following is a complete list of teams who are contesting the 2015–16 Croatian Women's First Football League.

Team	Location	Stadium(s)	Position in 2014–15
Agram	Zagreb	Stadion Buzin	5th
Dinamo-Maksimir	Zagreb	Annexe field at Stadion Maksimir	3rd
Katarina Zrinski	Čakovec	Stadion NK Sloga Čakovec	8th
Marjan	Split	Stadion Poljud	Promoted
Ombla	Dubrovnik	Stadion Lapad	6th
Osijek	Osijek	Mačkamama, Stadion Gradski vrt	1st
Pregrada	Pregrada	Stadion NK Pregrada	7th
Split	Split	Stadion Park Mladeži	2nd
Trnava	Goričan	Stadion Gaj	4th
Viktorija	Slavonski Brod		9th

== League table ==
Pos	Team	Pld	W	D	L	GF	GA	GD	Pts	Qualification or relegation
1	Osijek	18	17	1	0	147	3	+144	52	Qualification to Champions League qualifying round
2	Split	18	12	2	4	71	23	+48	38	
3	Trnava	18	11	2	5	52	27	+25	35	
4	Agram	18	10	1	7	43	38	+5	31	
5	Marjan	18	7	2	9	34	68	−34	23	
6	Pregrada (Note: Deducted 3 points)	18	7	1	10	47	86	−39	19	
7	Ombla	18	6	0	12	32	63	−31	18	
8	Katarina Zrinski	18	5	1	12	28	69	−41	16	
9	Viktorija	18	5	1	12	25	75	−50	16	
10	Dinamo-Maksimir (Note: Deducted 6 points)	18	4	1	13	30	57	−27	7	Relegation to 2. HNLŽ

Source: UEFA.com HNS.hr
Rules for classification: 1) points; 2) goal difference; 3) number of goals scored

== Results ==
Home \ Away	AGR	DIN	KAT	MAR	OMB	OSI	PRE	SPL	TRN	VIK
Agram		3–0	5–2	1–2	7–0	0–12	0–0	2–0	1–3	4–1
Dinamo-Maksimir	1–4		1–5	1–3	6–3	0–7	3–7	4–0	0–3	2–0
Katarina Zrinski	1–2	2–1		3–0	2–1	0–10	1–3	0–3	3–3	4–2
Marjan	0–6	2–2	5–0		0–3	0–6	10–1	3–2	0–5	3–0
Ombla	3–1	2–1	3–1	0–6		0–6	7–2	2–3	3–0	2–3
Osijek	9–0	3–0	12–0	20–0	7–0		3–0	5–0	4–0	7–0
Pregrada	2–1	2–5	2–0	9–0	5–3	0–15		0–7	2–3	11–1
Split	2–0	5–0	9–2	5–0	3–0	3–3	11–0		3–0	9–0
Trnava	0–3	1–0	4–1	4–0	7–0	0–5	9–0	2–2		5–0
Viktorija	0–3	5–3	3–1	0–0	3–0	0–13	7–1	0–4	0–3	

Updated to match(es) played on 22 May 2016. Source: HNS Soccerway
Legend: Blue = home team win; Yellow = draw; Red = away team win.

== Top scorers ==
Updated to matches played on 22 May 2016.

Rank	Player	Club	Goals
1	(Croatia) Izabela Lojna	Osijek	28
2	(Croatia) Mateja Andrlić	Osijek	20
3	(Croatia) Ana Marija Kalamiza	Marjan	19
4	(Croatia) Anela Lubina	Split	17
5	(Croatia) Lorena Balić	Osijek	15
5	(Croatia) Perica Cicijelj	Trnava	15
5	(Croatia) Tomislava Matijević	Dinamo-Maksimir	15
8	(Croatia) Maja Joščak	Osijek	14
8	(Croatia) Martina Krog	Katarina Zrinski	14
8	(Croatia) Andreja Šćukanec-Hopinski	Pregrada	14
8	(Croatia) Andrea Valušek	Split	14
