= Monroe University =

American for-profit college based in New York

Coordinates: 40.8640°N 73.9004°W

- Former names: Monroe School of Business (1933–1963); Monroe Business Institute (1963–1990); Monroe College (1990–2024)
- Type: Private for-profit college
- Established: 1933
- President: Marc Jerome
- Faculty: 196 FT/ 339 PT (2023)
- Students: 7,924 (2023)
- Undergraduates: 6,400 (2023)
- Postgraduates: 1,524 (2023)
- Location: New York, United States; St Lucia
- Campus: Urban
- Colors: Blue and Gold
- Mascot: Mustangs
- Website: monroeu.edu

Monroe University is a private for-profit university in New York City. It was founded in 1933 and has campuses in the Bronx, New Rochelle and Saint Lucia, with degree programs also available through Monroe Online. It is named after James Monroe, the fifth president of the United States. It is accredited by the Middle States Commission on Higher Education.

== History ==
King Hall Building in the Bronx

The school was founded in 1933 by Mildred King as the Monroe School of Business, a women's business school, in the West Farms section of the Bronx. The name came from the nearby James Monroe High School; the founder hoped that graduates of the high school might enroll at her new school of business. Classes were held at the site of the former Starlight Ballroom.

Monroe became an accredited junior college in 1972 when it earned the right to grant associate degrees; it was renamed to Monroe Business Institute. More classrooms were added on Morris Avenue, and in 1977 the West Farms facilities were closed and all Monroe programs were consolidated in the Fordham Road area.

In 1990 the school received accreditation from the Middle States Commission on Higher Education, and the name was again changed, to Monroe College.

On-campus student housing was constructed at its New Rochelle, New York, location in 2003. In the same year, degree programs in hospitality, criminal justice and culinary arts were introduced. The college built Milavec Hall, a building for math, English and arts classes, and began construction of a 200-bed student housing building at its Main Street location in New York.

Online course options for business management and administration were introduced in 2004 and an MBA program was added in 2005.

=== Leadership ===
1. Mildred King (1933–1972)
2. Harry Jerome (1936–1978)
3. Stephen Jerome (1978–2016)
4. Marc M. Jerome (2017–present)

== Academics ==
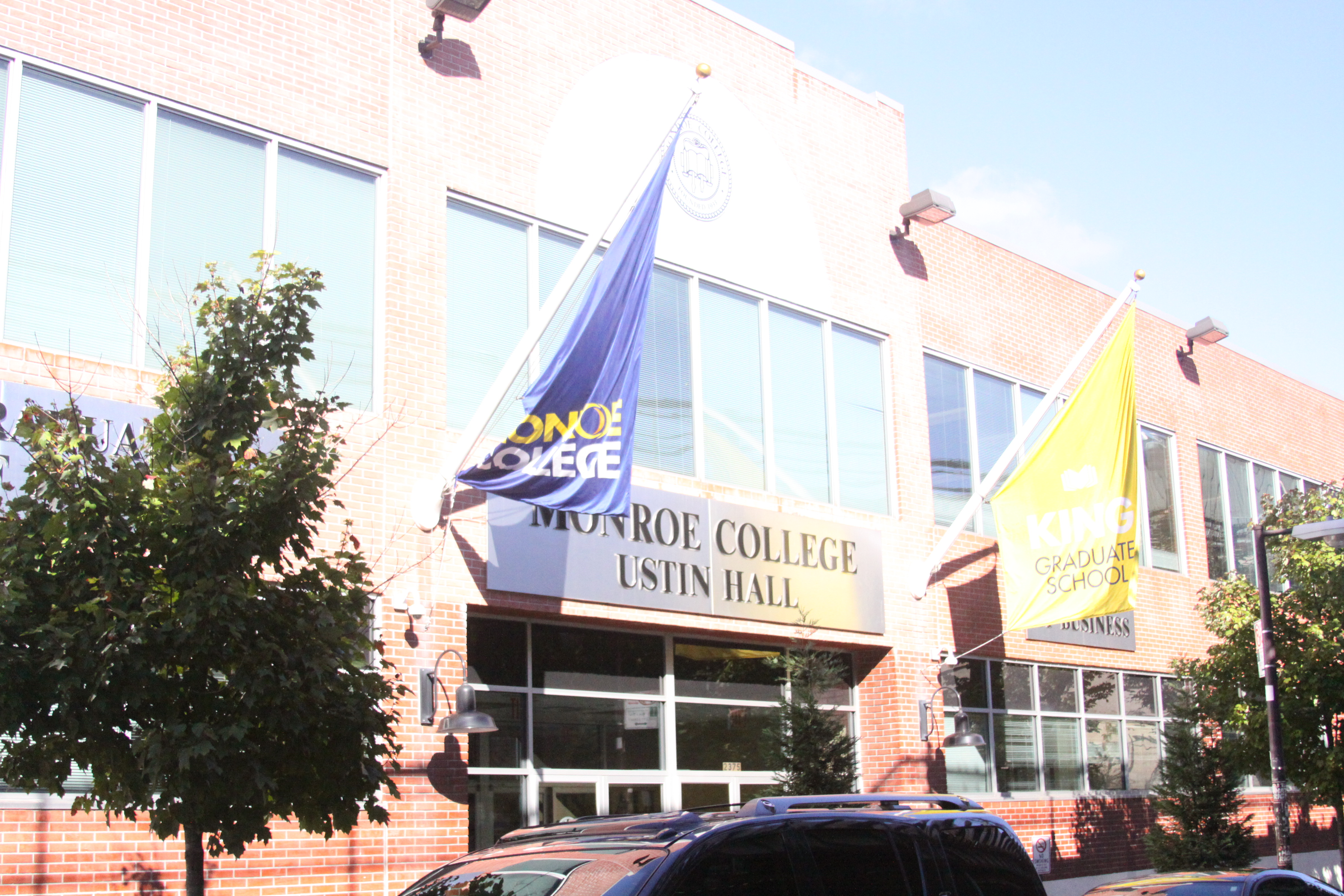
Ustin Hall

Monroe has more than 250 full-time faculty members and adjunct faculty members, and the undergraduate student-faculty ratio is 15:1. The academic year is divided into three academic semesters, each of which is a standard 15-week course of study.

=== Medicine ===
A school of allied health professions was founded in 2000 and has clinical and non-clinical programs. The school of nursing has programs such as the certificate in practical nursing program (LPN), an associate in applied science degree program (AAS), and a Bachelor of Science in Nursing degree (BSN) that qualifies graduates to obtain their license as a registered nurse.

=== Business ===
The school offers an associate degree program for accounting and business administration, and bachelor's degrees in accounting, public accounting, general business and business management. It is accredited by the Accreditation Council for Business Schools and Programs for its MBA, associate and bachelor programs as of June 2014. Monroe also has associate and bachelor's degree programs in information technology.

=== Hospitality and culinary ===
A school of hospitality management and the culinary arts was established in 2009, with associate degree programs in baking and pastry, culinary arts, and hospitality management, and a bachelor's degree in hospitality management. Students in the culinary program prepare each item and are responsible for the restaurant's daily operations. The culinary arts program was awarded the Marc Sarrazin Cup at the Salon of Culinary Art competition for two consecutive years, in 2013 and 2014. The college's Culinary Institute of New York (CINY) earned the American Culinary Federation's 2022 & 2023 Student Team Championship titles.

=== Education ===
A school of education was founded in the fall of 2011, and offers a bachelor's degree program in early childhood education; students receive training working with children at local nursery schools, daycare facilities, and special needs schools. It is partnered with the Americorp Jumpstart Program, an early education organization that trains college students to serve preschool children in low-income neighborhoods.

== Accreditation ==
Monroe College was accredited by the Middle States Commission on Higher Education in 1990. Degree programs include the Master of Business Administration, Bachelor of Science, Associate in Science and Associate in Applied Science. The school also offers an English Language Learning Institute post-secondary certificate program and a post-baccalaureate bilingual extension certificate.

The school instituted bachelor's programs in accounting, business management, and information systems after authorization from the New York State Board of Regents in 1996. In 2005, the board of regents authorized the college to grant Master of Business Administration degrees in business management. Since January 2006, its licensed practical nursing programs have been accredited by the Office of the Professions (Nursing Education) of the New York State Board of Regents. Other programs are accredited by the American Culinary Federation Education Foundation Accrediting Commission, the Accreditation Council for Business Schools and Programs, and the Accreditation Commission for Education in Nursing.

== Campuses ==
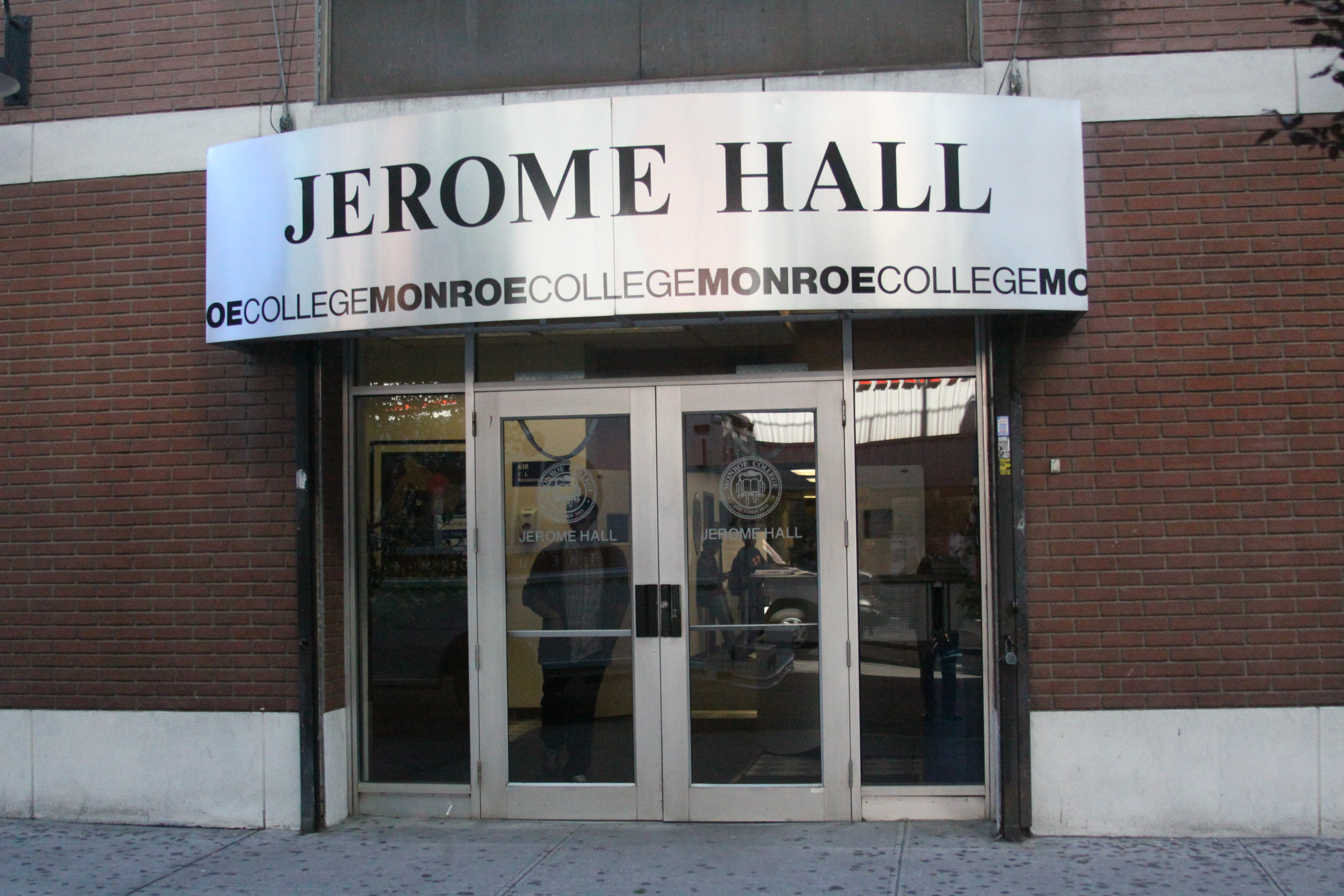
Jerome Hall, Bronx Campus

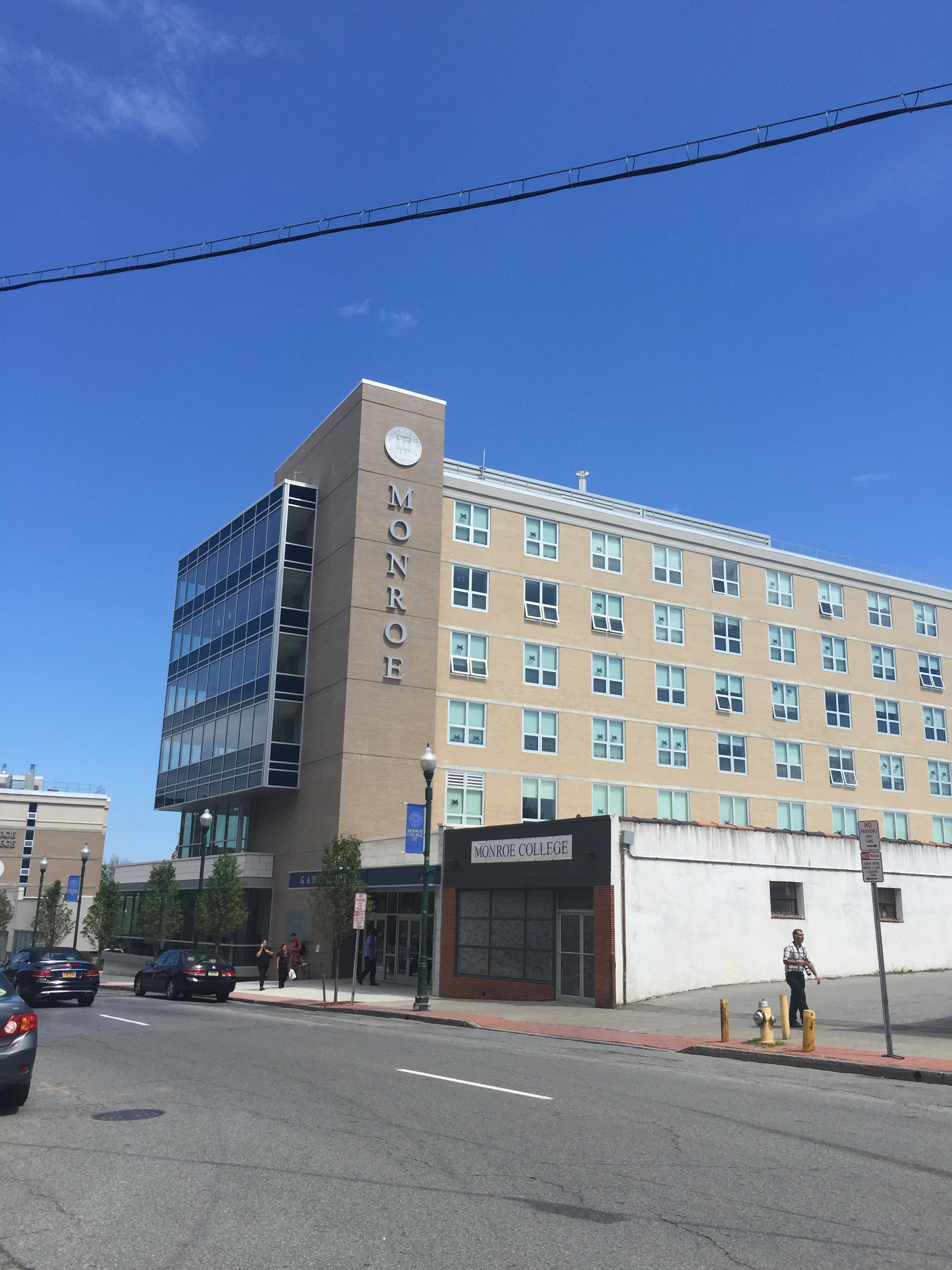
Gaddy Hall, New Rochelle Campus

There are three main campuses:

- The Bronx - The campus has been located in Fordham, Bronx neighborhood since 1967. It has seven buildings that are located near the Fordham shopping district, which consists of about 80 buildings that house nearly 300 businesses.
- New Rochelle, New York - This campus is a 30-minute train ride from Grand Central. It has six academic buildings including a culinary arts center, which opened in 2006, and houses a critically acclaimed student-run restaurant called The Dining Lab. In January 2011, the college completed a renovation of the former ice rink at New Roc City naming it the Monroe Athletic Complex (MAC). The Monroe Mustangs basketball and volleyball teams play on a 94-foot, wood-floor basketball court in the 45,000 square-foot arena. The complex also houses a track, locker rooms, a trainer's room, and seating for viewers. Residential buildings include Locust Hall, a six-story, 94-unit building, and Gaddy Hall, a six-story, mixed-use building. Locust Hall has a landscaped terrace, a ground-floor common area, and a parking garage. Gaddy Hall houses 300 students and is also home to the school of business and accounting.
- Saint Lucia - The campus is located near Castries, the capital and largest city on the Caribbean island. In 2018, it opened the International Hospitality Training Institute, which offers certification programs to local residents training for entry-level hospitality and tourism jobs.

== Student life ==
Students are 64 percent female and 36 percent male; about 48 percent are of black or African-American ethnicity and about 44 percent of Hispanic or South American origin. Undergraduate enrollment is 6,794 students, with approximately 958 international students. The Monroe Mustangs Marching Band marches in the annual New Rochelle Thanksgiving Day parade.

== Athletics ==
=== New Rochelle Mustangs ===
The athletic teams of the New Rochelle campus are called the Mustangs. The campus is a member of the National Junior College Athletic Association (NJCAA) in the Division I ranks within NJCAA Region XV, primarily competing as an Independent. The Mustangs previously competed in the Mid Hudson Conference. In 2027, the Mustangs are set to compete in the Northeast 10 Conference.

Monroe–New Rochelle competes in 13 intercollegiate varsity sports: men's sports include baseball, basketball, cross country, football, soccer, track & field and volleyball; while women's sports include basketball, cross country, soccer, softball, track & field and volleyball.

==== Accomplishments ====
In 2014 the women's soccer team won the NJCAA Division 1 National Championships. Monroe launched its Rugby program in 2017, with World Rugby Hall-of-Fame inductee Phaidra Knight as coach. In 2018, the women's soccer team also won their same NJCAA Championship title, and the baseball team made it to JUCO World Series. That same year, their football team made its first NJCAA bowl appearance at the Graphic Edge Bowl. In 2019, the Monroe Mustangs men's soccer team won its first NJCAA Championship with an undefeated 18–0 record.

==== Alumni ====
Notable alumni who went on to pursue professional sports careers include: Orlando Sánchez, Maurice Ndour, Tuzar Skipper, Anthony Stubbs, Francisco Justo, Christopher Belcher, Kathellen Sousa, Carol Rodrigues, and Sandra Žigić.

=== Bronx Express ===
The athletic teams of the Bronx campus are called the Express. The campus is a member of the National Junior College Athletic Association (NJCAA) in the Division III level within NJCAA Region 15.

Monroe–Bronx competes in eleven intercollegiate varsity sports. Men's sports include: baseball, basketball, lacrosse, football, soccer and tennis; while women's sports include: basketball, softball, soccer, tennis and volleyball.

== Notable alumni ==
- Maria Baez, is a Democrat who was a member of the New York City Council, District 14.
- Omar Newell, (b 1981) is a Jamaican political representative and member of the People's National Party. On September 3, 2025, Newell was elected Member of Parliament for Saint Mary Central in Jamaica's House of Representatives.
- Hector John, (b 1970) is a Dominican politician in the United Workers' Party (UWP).
- Maurice Ndour, (b 1992) is a Senegalese professional basketball player for Hapoel Jerusalem of the Israeli Basketball Premier League.
- Annabel Palma, is a politician who served in the New York City Council from the 18th district from 2004 to 2017.
- Rafael Salamanca, (b 1980) is the Council member for the 17th district of the New York City Council.
- Amina Warsuma, (b 1953) is a model, author, actress and filmmaker.
- Sandra Žigić, (b 1988) is a Croatian footballer who plays as a defender.
