= 2023–24 Croatian Women's First Football League =

Prva HNLŽ
- Season: 2023–24
- Champions: Osijek
- Relegated: Donat
- Champions League: Osijek
- Matches: 79
- Goals: 323 (4.09 per match)
- Top goalscorer: Lorena Balić (28 goals)
- Biggest home win: Osijek 13–0 Međimurje
- Biggest away win: Gorica 0–11 Osijek
- Highest scoring: Osijek 13–0 Međimurje
- All statistics correct as of 10 June 2024.

The 2023–24 Croatian Women's First Football League (Prva hrvatska nogometna liga za žene) was the 33rd season of Croatian Women's First Football League, the national championship for women's association football teams in Croatia, since its establishment in 1992. The season started on 3 September 2023.

The league was contested by eight teams. First stage was played in a double round robin format, with each team playing every other team two times over 14 rounds. In a second stage teams were divided in two groups according to the table standings. ŽNK Osijek were the defending champions, having won their 24th title in 2022–23.

== Teams ==
Locations of teams in 2023–24 Croatian Women's First Football League

The following is a complete list of teams who have secured a place in the 2023–24 Croatian Women's First Football League.

Team	Location	Stadium(s)	Position in 2022–23
Agram	Zagreb	Stadion Buzin	4th
Dinamo Zagreb	Zagreb	Stadion Maksimir	3rd
Donat	Zadar	Stadion Stanovi	6th
Gorica	Velika Gorica		1st (2. HNLŽ A)
Hajduk Split	Split		5th
Međimurje Čakovec	Čakovec	Stadion SRC Mladost	1st (2. HNLŽ B)
Osijek	Osijek	Mačkamama, Stadion Gradski vrt	1st
Split	Split	Stadion Park Mladeži	2nd

== Regular season ==
=== League table ===
Pos	Team	Pld	W	D	L	GF	GA	GD	Pts	Qualification or relegation
1	Osijek	14	14	0	0	89	4	+85	42	Qualification for the Championship play-offs
2	Hajduk Split	14	10	1	3	40	14	+26	31	Qualification for the Championship play-offs
3	Split	14	9	0	5	34	16	+18	27	Qualification for the Championship play-offs
4	Dinamo Zagreb	14	5	4	5	21	16	+5	19	Qualification for the Championship play-offs
5	Agram	14	4	4	6	13	22	−9	16	Qualification for the Relegation play-offs
6	Gorica	14	3	2	9	13	50	−37	11	Qualification for the Relegation play-offs
7	Međimurje Čakovec	14	3	2	9	12	58	−46	11	Qualification for the Relegation play-offs
8	Donat	14	1	1	12	8	50	−42	4	Qualification for the Relegation play-offs

Updated to match(es) played on 21 April 2024. Source: soccerway.com HNS.hr
Rules for classification: 1) Points; 2) Head-to-head points; 3) Head-to-head goal difference; 4) Head-to-head goals scored (at home if two teams tied); 5) Goal difference; 6) Goals scored; 7) Play-off
(Note: Criteria 2-4 and 7 is only used if deciding champion, teams to international competition or teams for relegation and in that case criteria 6 will not be used).

=== Results ===
Home \ Away	AGR	DIN	DON	GOR	HAJ	MEĐ	OSI	SPL
Agram	—	0–0	1–0	1–1	1–0	2–0	0–4	1–2
Dinamo Zagreb	1–1	—	3–0	1–1	2–2	4–0	1–4	0–2
Donat	0–2	0–4	—	1–0	0–5	2–3	0–7	0–3
Gorica	2–1	0–2	4–2	—	0–2	1–2	0–11	0–5
Hajduk Split	2–0	2–1	3–0	9–0	—	6–0	0–3	3–1
Međimurje Čakovec	2–2	0–2	2–2	0–2	0–4	—	0–8	3–2
Osijek	6–1	3–0 (Note: The Osijek v Dinamo Zagreb match was awarded as a 3–0 win to Osijek. Match originally ended as a 1–1 draw.)	11–0	8–2	5–0	13–0	—	5–0
Split	2–0	1–0	2–1	5–0	1–2	8–0	0–1	—

Updated to match(es) played on 21 April 2024. Source: HNS.hr
Legend: Blue = home team win; Yellow = draw; Red = away team win.
For upcoming matches, an "a" indicates there is an article about the rivalry between the two participants.

== Play-offs ==
=== Championship play-offs ===
==== League table ====
Pos	Team	Pld	W	D	L	GF	GA	GD	Pts	Qualification or relegation
1	Osijek (C, Q)	20	18	2	0	108	10	+98	56	Qualification for the Champions League first round
2	Hajduk Split	20	13	4	3	55	20	+35	43	
3	Split	20	9	1	10	38	40	−2	28	
4	Dinamo Zagreb	20	7	4	9	30	27	+3	25	

Updated to match(es) played on 10 June 2024. Source: soccerway.com HNS.hr
Rules for classification: 1) Points; 2) Head-to-head points; 3) Head-to-head goal difference; 4) Head-to-head goals scored (at home if two teams tied); 5) Goal difference; 6) Goals scored; 7) Play-off
(Note: Criteria 2-4 and 7 is only used if deciding champion, teams to international competition or teams for relegation and in that case criteria 6 will not be used).
(C) Champions; (Q) Qualified for the phase indicated

==== Results ====
Home \ Away	DIN	HAJ	OSI	SPL
Dinamo Zagreb	—	0–2	1–5	4–0
Hajduk Split	2–0	—	0–0	5–0
Osijek	2–1	3–3	—	4–1
Split	0–3	3–3	0–5	—

Updated to match(es) played on 10 June 2024. Source: HNS.hr
Legend: Blue = home team win; Yellow = draw; Red = away team win.
For upcoming matches, an "a" indicates there is an article about the rivalry between the two participants.

=== Relegation play-offs ===
==== League table ====
Pos	Team	Pld	W	D	L	GF	GA	GD	Pts	Qualification or relegation
5	Agram	20	7	5	8	32	27	+5	26	
6	Međimurje Čakovec	20	8	2	10	30	65	−35	26	
7	Gorica (O)	20	5	3	12	19	68	−49	18	Qualification to Relegation play-off
8	Donat (R)	20	1	3	16	14	69	−55	6	Relegation to 2. HNLŽ

Updated to match(es) played on 10 June 2024. Source: soccerway.com HNS.hr
Rules for classification: 1) Points; 2) Head-to-head points; 3) Head-to-head goal difference; 4) Head-to-head goals scored (at home if two teams tied); 5) Goal difference; 6) Goals scored; 7) Play-off
(Note: Criteria 2-4 and 7 is only used if deciding champion, teams to international competition or teams for relegation and in that case criteria 6 will not be used).
(O) Play-off winners; (R) Relegated

==== Results ====
Home \ Away	AGR	DON	GOR	MEĐ
Agram	—	4–1	11–0	1–2
Donat	1–1	—	1–1	2–4
Gorica	0–2	2–0	—	2–1
Međimurje Čakovec	1–0	7–1	3–1	—

Updated to match(es) played on 10 June 2024. Source: HNS.hr
Legend: Blue = home team win; Yellow = draw; Red = away team win.
For upcoming matches, an "a" indicates there is an article about the rivalry between the two participants.

==== Relegation play-off ====
At the end of the season, seventh placed Gorica will contest a two-legged relegation play-off tie against the losing team of promotion play-off tie between Neretva and Koprivnica.

===== First leg =====
12 June 2024
18:15

Gorica	6–0	Koprivnica
Stipetić 9', 78'; Rendulić 14', 39', 82'; Godinić 74'	Report

Stadion Radnik, Velika Gorica

===== Second leg =====
23 June 2024
16:30

Koprivnica	1–4	Gorica
Goričanec 74'	Report	Stipetić 8'; Klarić 44'; Delač 66'; Gačić 69'

NK Starigrad, Starigrad

Gorica won 10–1 on aggregate.

== Top scorers ==
As of 10 June 2024

Rank	Player	Club	Goals
1	(Croatia) Lorena Balić	Osijek	28
2	(Croatia) Izabela Lojna	Osijek	26
3	(Bosnia and Herzegovina) Andrea Grebenar	Hajduk Split	22
4	(Montenegro) Jasna Đoković	Split	16
4	(Croatia) Maja Joščak	Osijek	16
6	(Bosnia and Herzegovina) Branka Bagarić	Hajduk Split	9
6	(Bosnia and Herzegovina) Marija Damjanović	Osijek	9
8	(India) Jyoti Chouhan	Dinamo Zagreb	8
9	(Croatia) Perica Cicijelj	Gorica	7
9	(Croatia) Anela Lubina	Osijek	7
