= 2013–14 Croatian Women's First Football League =

Prva HNLŽ
- Season: 2013–14
- Champions: Osijek
- Relegated: Marjan
- Champions League: Osijek
- Matches: 84
- Goals: 489 (5.82 per match)
- Top goalscorer: Mateja Andrlić (43)
- Biggest home win: Osijek 20–0 Agram
- Biggest away win: Trnava 0–14 Osijek
- Highest scoring: Osijek 20–0 Agram

The 2013–14 Croatian Women's First Football League (Prva hrvatska nogometna liga za žene) was the twenty-third season of Croatian Women's First Football League, the national championship for women's association football teams in Croatia, since its establishment in 1992.

The league was contested by 8 teams. ŽNK Osijek were the defending champions, having won their seventeenth title in 2012–13.

== League table ==
Pos	Team	Pld	W	D	L	GF	GA	GD	Pts	Qualification or relegation
1	Osijek	21	21	0	0	180	6	+174	63	Qualification to Champions League qualifying round
2	Split	21	15	2	4	70	23	+47	47	
3	Rijeka-Jack Pot (Note: Deducted 3 points)	21	11	2	8	50	59	−9	32	
4	Dinamo-Maksimir	21	10	0	11	45	63	−18	30	
5	Trnava	21	7	3	11	39	66	−27	24	
6	Agram	21	5	3	13	41	88	−47	18	
7	Pregrada	21	5	2	14	36	112	−76	17	
8	Marjan (Note: Deducted 6 points)	21	3	2	16	28	72	−44	5	Relegation to 2. HLNŽ

Source: CFF
Rules for classification: 1) points; 2) goal difference; 3) number of goals scored

== Results ==
=== First round ===
Home \ Away	AGR	DIN	MAR	OSI	PRE	RIJ	SPL	TRN
Agram	—	2–1	2–0	0–5	4–4	1–5	1–2	1–3
Dinamo-Maksimir	4–2	—	4–1	0–7	11–0	1–2	0–1	4–3
Marjan	4–1	0–3	—	0–4	0–0	0–6	0–5	4–4
Osijek	20–0	11–0	6–1	—	16–1	3–0	8–0	9–0
Pregrada	1–8	2–4	5–2	0–13	—	1–8	0–7	5–3
Rijeka-Jack Pot	4–1	3–2	2–3	1–5	3–0	—	1–1	3–0
Split	8–0	4–0	5–1	0–4	6–0	2–2	—	3–1
Trnava	3–3	1–2	2–0	0–14	7–0	0–1	1–0	—

Source: CFF
Legend: Blue = home team win; Yellow = draw; Red = away team win.

=== Second round ===
Home \ Away	AGR	DIN	MAR	OSI	PRE	RIJ	SPL	TRN
Agram	—	—	—	1–4	2–1	7–1	—	—
Dinamo-Maksimir	3–1	—	—	—	0–2	—	1–2	3–1
Marjan	6–2	0–1	—	—	—	—	0–13	—
Osijek	—	16–0	3–0	—	—	—	2–1	8–0
Pregrada	—	—	5–2	0–10	—	8–0	—	—
Rijeka-Jack Pot	—	2–1	5–3	1–12	—	—	—	0–1
Split	7–0	—	—	—	4–0	7–0	—	2–1
Trnava	2–2	—	4–1	—	2–1	—	—	—

Source: CFF
Legend: Blue = home team win; Yellow = draw; Red = away team win.

== Top goalscorers ==
The top scorers in the 2013–14 Prva HNLŽ season were:

Rank	Name	Club	Goals	Apps	Minutes played
1	Mateja Andrlić	Osijek	43	19	1509
2	Izabela Lojna	Osijek	42	19	1620
3	Maja Joščak	Osijek	26	18	1406
3	Martina Šalek	Osijek	26	18	1558
5	Ana Marija Kalamiza	Split	25	19	1692
6	Perica Cicijelj	Trnava, Rijeka-Jack Pot	14	18	1408
6	Andreja Šćukanec-Hopinski	Pregrada	14	17	1530
8	Iva Bukač	Agram	13	20	1770
9	Ana Petrović	Split	12	21	1829
10	Sandra Žigić	Dinamo-Maksimir	11	9	744
10	Andrea Valušek	Rijeka-Jack Pot	11	17	1418
10	Ana Dujmović	Marjan	11	18	1522
