= Sandra Žigić =

Croatian footballer (born 1988)

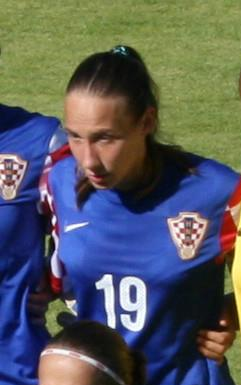

Personal information
- Full name: Sandra Žigić
- Date of birth: 19 January 1988 (age 38)
- Place of birth: Zagreb, Yugoslavia (now Croatia)
- Position: Defender

Team information
- Current team: ŽNK Siget
- Number: 19

Senior career*
Years	Team	Apps	(Gls)
- Dinamo Maksimir
2008–2009	St. Veit	12	(4)
2009–2011	Plamen Križevci		
2011–2012	Dinamo Maksimir	18	(8)
2012–2014	Monroe Mustangs		
2014–2016	Medyk Konin		
2016–2017	Osijek		
2017–2018	FF USV Jena	18	(0)
2018–2020	Milan	23	(1)
2020–2021	Orobica		
2021–2024	Agram	31	(21)
2024–	ŽNK Siget	6	(1)

International career
2004–2006	Croatia U19	15	(0)
2005–2019	Croatia	94	(10)
- * Club domestic league appearances and goals as of 27 November 2024

Sandra Žigić (born 19 January 1988) is a Croatian footballer who plays as a defender for ŽNK Siget.

== Club career ==
She played for Dinamo Maksimir (with which she also played the European Cup) and Plamen Križevci in the Croatian 1st Division, FC St. Veit in the Austrian Frauenliga, the Monroe Mustangs in the NJCAA and Medyk Konin in the Polish Ekstraliga.

She left Jena in the SUmmer 2018 and joined newly formed A.C. Milan Women.

== International career ==
She made her debut for the Croatian national team in May 2005, and she is one of Croatia's most experienced player with 89 international appearances as of February 2020.

== Honours ==
Medyk Konin

- Ekstraliga: 2014–15, 2015–16
- Polish Cup: 2014–15, 2015–16
