= Lucija Mori =

Slovenian footballer (born 1988)

Personal information
- Full name: Lucija Mori
- Date of birth: 31 January 1988 (age 38)
- Place of birth: Dravograd, SFR Yugoslavia
- Position: Goalkeeper

Team information
- Current team: Soccer Women Carinthians

Senior career*
Years	Team	Apps	(Gls)
2004–2010	Slovenj Gradec		
2010–2011	Pomurje		
2011	→ Stattegg		
2011–2013	Brescia		(0)
2013–	Soccer Women Carinthians		

International career
2009–	Slovenia		
- * Club domestic league appearances and goals as of 8 September 2012

Lucija Mori (born 31 January 1988) is a Slovenian international football goalkeeper currently playing for Soccer Women Carinthians in the Austrian league. She has also played in her country and for Serie A's ACF Brescia.

She has been the first choice goalkeeper in the Slovenian national team since the 2011 World Cup qualification
