= 2025–26 Croatian Women's First Football League =

Croatian women's football league season

First League
- Season: 2025–26
- Dates: 30 August 2025 – 15 February 2026 (Regular season); 22 February – 31 May 2026 (Play-off matches)
- Champions: Hajduk Split
- Relegated: Istra
- Champions League: Hajduk Split
- Europa Cup: Agram
- Matches: 75
- Goals: 323 (4.31 per match)
- Top goalscorer: Jasna Đoković (27 goals)
- All statistics correct as of 31 May 2026.

The 2025–26 season of the First League was the 35th edition of the Croatian top-tier women's football league. The league was consisted of 8 teams. During the regular season, teams were played each other twice, once at home and once away. At the end of the regular season, the top four teams qualified for the Championship Group, while the bottom four teams qualified for the Relegation Group.

Agram were the defending champions, having won their first title in the 2024–25 season.

== Teams ==
Locations of teams in the 2025–26 Prva HNLŽ.

Team	Home city	Home ground	Capacity	2024–25 finish
Agram	Zagreb	SRC Špansko	1,000	1st
Dinamo Zagreb	Zagreb	Stadion Maksimir	25,912	5th
Gorica	Velika Gorica	Gradski Stadion	4,536	7th
Hajduk Split	Split	Stadion Poljud	33,987	3rd
Istra	Pula	Stadion Aldo Drosina	10,000	1st (Druga HNLŽ A)
Međimurje Čakovec	Čakovec	Stadion SRC Mladost	8,000	4th
Osijek	Osijek	Gradski Vrt Stadium	18,856	2nd
Split	Split	Stadion Park Mladeži	4,075	6th

=== Team changes ===
Entering league	Exiting league
Promoted from 2024 to 2025 Second League	Relegated to 2025–26 Second League
Istra	Neretva

== Regular season ==
=== League table ===
Pos	Team	Pld	W	D	L	GF	GA	GD	Pts	Qualification
1	Hajduk Split	12	10	1	1	43	10	+33	31	Advances to championship round
2	Agram	12	9	0	3	51	15	+36	27	Advances to championship round
3	Dinamo Zagreb	12	8	1	3	38	13	+25	25	Advances to championship round
4	Međimurje Čakovec	12	6	2	4	28	19	+9	20	Advances to championship round
5	Osijek	12	4	2	6	27	23	+4	14	Participates in qualification round
6	Gorica	12	2	0	10	12	43	−31	6	Participates in qualification round
7	Split	12	0	0	12	4	80	−76	0	Participates in qualification round
8	Istra (D, R)	0	0	0	0	0	0	0	0 (Note: Istra has been expelled from the league.)	Withdraw from the competition

Source: HNS.family
Rules for classification: 1) Points; 2) Head-to-head points; 3) Head-to-head goal difference; 4) Head-to-head goals scored (at home if two teams tied); 5) Goal difference; 6) Goals scored; 7) Play-off
(Note: Criteria 2-4 and 7 is only used if deciding champion, teams to international competition or teams for relegation and in that case criteria 6 will not be used).
(D) Disqualified; (R) Relegated

=== Results ===
Home \ Away	AGR	DIN	GOR	HAJ	MEĐ	IST	OSI	SPL
Agram		2–3	8–0	0–4	2–0		3–0	13–0
Dinamo Zagreb	1–2		3–0	3–2	1–0		5–1	11–0
Gorica	2–6	0–4		1–3	0–4		1–2	2–0
Hajduk Split	2–0	2–1	5–2		4–0		2–1	8–0
Međimurje Čakovec	2–5	4–0	3–0	1–1			3–1	5–2
Istra								
Osijek	1–5	0–0	5–1	1–2	1–1			5–0
Split	0–5	0–6	0–3	0–8	2–5		0–9	

Source: HNS.family
Legend: Blue = home team win; Yellow = draw; Red = away team win.

== Championship round ==
=== League table ===
Pos	Team	Pld	W	D	L	GF	GA	GD	Pts	Qualification
1	Hajduk Split (C)	24	18	3	3	69	17	+52	57	Qualification to Champions League second qualifying round
2	Agram	24	16	1	7	80	31	+49	49	Qualification for Europa Cup second qualifying round
3	Dinamo Zagreb	24	13	2	9	55	33	+22	41	
4	Međimurje Čakovec	24	8	2	14	42	62	−20	26	

Source: HNS.family
Rules for classification: 1) Points; 2) Head-to-head points; 3) Head-to-head goal difference; 4) Head-to-head goals scored (at home if two teams tied); 5) Goal difference; 6) Goals scored; 7) Play-off
(Note: Criteria 2-4 and 7 is only used if deciding champion, teams to international competition or teams for relegation and in that case criteria 6 will not be used).
(C) Champions

=== Results ===
==== Rounds 1–6 ====
Home \ Away	HAJ	DIN	AGR	MEĐ
Hajduk Split		1–1	1–1	5–1
Dinamo Zagreb	1–0		0–3	2–0
Agram	1–2	0–1		4–2
Međimurje Čakovec	0–2	1–4	1–5	

Source: HNS.family
Legend: Blue = home team win; Yellow = draw; Red = away team win.

==== Rounds 7–12 ====
Home \ Away	HAJ	DIN	AGR	MEĐ
Hajduk Split		1–0	1–2	3–0
Dinamo Zagreb	0–2		3–2	2–3
Agram	0–4	2–0		4–1
Međimurje Čakovec	0–4	5–3	0–5	

Source: HNS.family
Legend: Blue = home team win; Yellow = draw; Red = away team win.

== Qualification round ==
=== League table ===
Pos	Team	Pld	W	D	L	GF	GA	GD	Pts	Relegation
1	Osijek	18	7	4	7	44	32	+12	25	
2	Gorica	18	4	1	13	21	55	−34	13	
3	Split	18	2	1	15	12	94	−82	7	Participates in relegation play-off
4	Istra (D, R)	0	0	0	0	0	0	0	0	Withdraw from the competition

Source: HNS.family
Rules for classification: 1) Points; 2) Head-to-head points; 3) Head-to-head goal difference; 4) Head-to-head goals scored (at home if two teams tied); 5) Goal difference; 6) Goals scored; 7) Play-off
(Note: Criteria 2-4 and 7 is only used if deciding champion, teams to international competition or teams for relegation and in that case criteria 6 will not be used).
(D) Disqualified; (R) Relegated

=== Results ===
==== Rounds 1–6 ====
Home \ Away	OSI	GOR	SPL	IST
Osijek		3–3	1–1	
Gorica	3–0		1–3	
Split	1–3	1–2		
Istra				

Source: HNS.family
Legend: Blue = home team win; Yellow = draw; Red = away team win.

==== Rounds 7–12 ====
Home \ Away	OSI	GOR	SPL	IST
Osijek		3–3	7–1	
Gorica	0–3		0–2	
Split				
Istra				

Source: HNS.family
Legend: Blue = home team win; Yellow = draw; Red = away team win.

== Relegation play-off ==
The team that finishes 3rd in the qualification group participates in a two-leg play-off against the loser of the 2025–26 Druga Liga promotion play-off between the winners of the two divisions. The winner earns a spot in the 2026–27 Prva Liga.

Team 1	Agg.	Team 2	1st leg	2nd leg
Marsonia	–	Split	0–8	–

31 May 2026	Marsonia	0–8	Split	Slavonski Brod
11:00		Report	Rusković 2', 55'; Mišura 16', 32'; Kapitanović 55', 57'; Plazibat 71'; Skenderi 86'	Stadium: Stadion uz Savu; Attendance: 200; Referee: Ivana Martinčić

7 June 2026	Split	v	Marsonia	Split
11:00				Stadium: Stadion Park Mladeži

The match was cancelled due to ŽNK Marsonia's failure to take the field, and ŽNK Split was declared the winner by forfeit.

== Top scorers ==
As of 31 May 2026

Rank	Player	Club	Goals
1	(Montenegro) Jasna Đoković	Agram	27
2	(Italy) Anita Coda	Međimurje Čakovec	15
3	(Croatia) Ana Dujmović	Agram	14
4	(Bosnia and Herzegovina) Andrea Grebenar	Hajduk Split	13
5	(Estonia) Katrin Kirpu	Agram	12
6	(Croatia) Ivana Stanić	Agram	11
7	(Croatia) Lana Rusković	Split	10
8	(Bosnia and Herzegovina) Branka Bagarić	Hajduk Split	9
9	(Croatia) Barbara Živković	Hajduk Split	9
10	(Japan) Marin Hamamoto	Međimurje Čakovec	8
11	(Croatia) Andreja Šćukanec-Hopinski	Gorica	8
12	(Croatia) Helena Spajić	Dinamo Zagreb	8
13	(Croatia) Lana Popić	Osijek	8
