= Morais Guy =

Jamaican politician

Dr. Morais Guy CD MP

MP for Saint Mary Central
- In office 16 October 2002 – 3 September 2025
- Succeeded by: Omar Newell

Personal details
- Born: November 25, 1955 (age 70)
- Party: People's National Party
- Education: University of the West Indies (BM, MBBS)

Morais Valentine Guy is a Jamaican politician from the People's National Party. He is member of the Shadow Cabinet of Jamaica, and is Shadow Minister for Health.

He has been an MP since 2002 having been elected on October 16, 2002 and has served continuously since then having contested 5 elections.

he previously served as a Cabinet Minister from 2012-2016 as Minister without Portfolio (Ministry of Transport, works & Housing with responsibility for Housing as well as the Island Traffic Authority.
