= Lynette Ureña =

Dominican Republic footballer

Personal information
- Full name: Lynette Zahira Ureña Díaz
- Date of birth: 27 June 2000 (age 26)
- Place of birth: Santo Domingo, Dominican Republic
- Height: 1.63 m (5 ft 4 in)
- Position: Right back

Team information
- Current team: Osijek

College career
Years	Team	Apps	(Gls)
2018	Briar Cliff Chargers	13	(0)
2019–2022	Delaware State Hornets	43	(2)

Senior career*
Years	Team	Apps	(Gls)
2019	CAFC Ospreys	7	(0)
2024–	Osijek	0	(0)

International career^{‡}
2020	Dominican Republic U20	2	(0)
2019–	Dominican Republic	3	(0)
- * Club domestic league appearances and goals as of 22 June 2019 ‡ National team caps and goals as of 4 March 2020

Lynette Zahira Ureña Díaz (born 27 June 2000) is a Dominican footballer who plays as a right back for Croatian Women's First League club Osijek and the Dominican Republic women's national team.

== International career ==
Ureña has appeared for the Dominican Republic at the 2020 CONCACAF Women's Olympic Qualifying Championship qualification.
