= 2014–15 Croatian Women's First Football League =

Prva HNLŽ
- Season: 2014–15
- Champions: Osijek
- Champions League: Osijek
- Top goalscorer: Ana Marija Kalamiza (33)
- Biggest home win: Osijek 17–0 Rijeka-Jack Pot
- Biggest away win: Pregrada 0–11 Osijek
- Highest scoring: Osijek 17–0 Rijeka-Jack Pot

The 2014–15 Croatian Women's First Football League (Prva hrvatska nogometna liga za žene) was the twenty fourth season of Croatian Women's First Football League, the national championship for women's association football teams in Croatia, since its establishment in 1992.

The league was contested by 10 teams, two more than in the previous season. ŽNK Osijek were the defending champions, having won their eighteenth title in 2013–14.

In April 2015, Rijeka-Jack Pot announced their withdrawal from the competition. According to the competition rulebook since they quit during the first half of the second part of the season, the matches played in the first part of the season were considered valid and all further matches were considered as not played. They played only one match in the second part of the season, a 5–1 loss against Viktorija.

== Teams ==
Locations of teams in 2014–15 Prva HNLŽ

The following is a complete list of teams who are contesting the 2014–15 Prva HNLŽ.

Team	Location	Stadium(s)	Position in 2013–14
Agram	Zagreb		6th
Dinamo-Maksimir	Zagreb		4th
Katarina Zrinski	Čakovec		1st (2. HNLŽ North-West)
Ombla	Dubrovnik	Lapad	1st (2. HNLŽ South)
Osijek	Osijek	Mačkamama, Gradski vrt	1st
Pregrada	Pregrada		7th
Rijeka-Jack Pot	Rijeka	Kantrida, Krimeja	3rd
Split	Split	Park mladeži	2nd
Trnava	Goričan	Gaj	5th
Viktorija	Slavonski Brod		1st (2. HNLŽ East)

== League table ==
Pos	Team	Pld	W	D	L	GF	GA	GD	Pts	Qualification or relegation
1	Osijek	17	17	0	0	143	4	+139	51	Qualification to Champions League qualifying round
2	Split	17	13	1	3	74	20	+54	40	
3	Dinamo-Maksimir (Note: Deducted 2 points)	17	11	1	5	55	31	+24	32	
4	Trnava (Note: Deducted 2 points)	17	10	2	5	34	37	−3	30	
5	Agram	17	7	5	5	37	40	−3	26	
6	Ombla	17	5	3	9	28	52	−24	18	
7	Pregrada	17	2	5	10	28	62	−34	11	
8	Katarina Zrinski	17	3	1	13	15	64	−49	10	
9	Viktorija	17	2	3	12	17	73	−56	9	
10	Rijeka-Jack Pot	9	0	1	8	6	54	−48	1	Relegation to 2. HLNŽ

Source: UEFA.com
Rules for classification: 1) points; 2) goal difference; 3) number of goals scored

== Results ==
Home \ Away	AGR	DIN	KAT	OMB	OSI	PRE	RIJ	SPL	TRN	VIK
Agram	—	2–4	3–1	3–0	0–7	1–1	—	0–3	2–2	6–3
Dinamo-Maksimir	0–2	—	2–0	3–0	1–8	7–0	9–0	2–4	2–1	8–0
Katarina Zrinski	2–2	0–2	—	0–2	0–11	3–2	3–2	0–8	1–3	2–0
Ombla	3–3	2–3	2–1	—	0–5	6–0	—	0–6	1–4	3–1
Osijek	8–0	4–1	13–0	10–0	—	5–1	17–0	5–0	8–0	13–0
Pregrada	3–4	4–4	4–2	3–3	0–11	—	—	1–3	1–4	0–1
Rijeka-Jack Pot	0–4	—	—	0–4	—	0–5	—	—	2–3	2–2
Split	2–2	3–0^{*}	6–0	6–0	1–4	5–0	7–0	—	3–0^{*}	7–1
Trnava	1–0	1–3	1–0	3–1	0–7	1–1	—	3–2	—	3–0
Viktorija	0–3	0–4	1–0	1–1	0–7	2–2	—	2–8	3–4	—

Source: UEFA.com
Legend: Blue = home team win; Yellow = draw; Red = away team win.
