= 2022–23 Croatian Women's First Football League =

Prva HNLŽ
- Season: 2022–23
- Champions: Osijek
- Relegated: Rijeka; Viktorija
- Champions League: Osijek
- Matches: 76
- Goals: 447 (5.88 per match)
- Top goalscorer: Lorena Balić (33)
- Biggest home win: Osijek 24–0 Viktorija
- Biggest away win: Viktorija 0–18 Osijek
- Highest scoring: Osijek 24–0 Viktorija
- All statistics correct as of 21 May 2023.

The 2022–23 Croatian Women's First Football League (Prva hrvatska nogometna liga za žene) is 32nd season of Croatian Women's First Football League, the national championship for women's association football teams in Croatia, since its establishment in 1992. The season started on 11 September 2022.

The league is contested by eight teams. First stage will be played in a double round robin format, with each team playing every other team two times over 14 rounds. In a second stage teams will be divided in two groups according to the table standings. ŽNK Split are the defending champions, having won their 3rd title in 2021–22.

== Teams ==
Locations of teams in 2022–23 Croatian Women's First Football League

The following is a complete list of teams who have secured a place in the 2022–23 Croatian Women's First Football League.

Team	Location	Stadium(s)	Position in 2021–22
Agram	Zagreb	Stadion Špansko	5th
Dinamo Zagreb	Zagreb	Stadion Oboj	3rd
Donat	Zadar	Stadion Stanovi	7th
Hajduk Split	Split	Stadion Poljud - pomoćni teren	1st (2. HNLŽ A)
Osijek	Osijek	Stadion NK Olimpija	2nd
Rijeka	Rijeka	Stadion Kantrida	4th
Split	Split	Stadion Park Mladeži	1st
Viktorija	Slavonski Brod	Jelas	2nd (2. HNLŽ B)

== Regular season ==
=== League table ===
Pos	Team	Pld	W	D	L	GF	GA	GD	Pts	Qualification or relegation
1	Osijek	14	14	0	0	90	4	+86	42	Qualification for the Championship play-offs
2	Split	14	11	0	3	78	13	+65	33	Qualification for the Championship play-offs
3	Dinamo Zagreb	14	8	1	5	46	20	+26	25	Qualification for the Championship play-offs
4	Agram	14	8	1	5	41	23	+18	25	Qualification for the Championship play-offs
5	Hajduk Split	14	7	2	5	45	17	+28	23	Qualification for the Relegation play-offs
6	Donat	14	3	1	10	18	44	−26	10	Qualification for the Relegation play-offs
7	Rijeka	14	2	1	11	25	73	−48	7	Qualification for the Relegation play-offs
8	Viktorija	14	0	0	14	2	151	−149	0	Qualification for the Relegation play-offs

Updated to match(es) played on 1 April 2023. Source: soccerway.com HNS.hr
Rules for classification: 1) Points; 2) Head-to-head points; 3) Head-to-head goal difference; 4) Head-to-head goals scored (at home if two teams tied); 5) Goal difference; 6) Goals scored; 7) Play-off
(Note: Criteria 2-4 and 7 is only used if deciding champion, teams to international competition or teams for relegation and in that case criteria 6 will not be used).

=== Results ===
Home \ Away	AGR	DIN	DON	HAJ	OSI	RIJ	SPL	VIK
Agram	—	0–1	1–0	1–1	0–4	5–3	1–2	6–0
Dinamo Zagreb	1–2	—	3–1	2–1	1–2	11–1	1–4	10–0
Donat	0–2	0–4	—	0–3	1–5	3–0	0–7	7–0
Hajduk Split	3–1	1–1	5–0	—	0–3	6–1	0–2	10–0
Osijek	4–0	3–1	8–0	2–0	—	5–0	2–1	24–0
Rijeka	2–3	0–4	2–2	1–2	0–9	—	0–7	10–1
Split	2–5	5–0	3–0	3–2	0–1	15–1	—	13–0
Viktorija	0–14	0–6	1–4	0–11	0–18	0–4	0–14	—

Updated to match(es) played on 1 April 2023. Source: HNS.hr
Legend: Blue = home team win; Yellow = draw; Red = away team win.
For upcoming matches, an "a" indicates there is an article about the rivalry between the two participants.

== Play-offs ==
=== Championship play-offs ===
==== League table ====
Pos	Team	Pld	W	D	L	GF	GA	GD	Pts	Qualification or relegation
1	Osijek (C, Q)	20	18	1	1	105	10	+95	55	Qualification for the Champions League first round
2	Split	20	16	1	3	97	16	+81	49	
3	Dinamo Zagreb	20	9	1	10	52	33	+19	28	
4	Agram	20	9	1	10	45	45	0	28	

Updated to match(es) played on 21 May 2023. Source: soccerway.com HNS.hr
Rules for classification: 1) Points; 2) Head-to-head points; 3) Head-to-head goal difference; 4) Head-to-head goals scored (at home if two teams tied); 5) Goal difference; 6) Goals scored; 7) Play-off
(Note: Criteria 2-4 and 7 is only used if deciding champion, teams to international competition or teams for relegation and in that case criteria 6 will not be used).
(C) Champions; (Q) Qualified for the phase indicated

==== Results ====
Home \ Away	AGR	DIN	OSI	SPL
Agram	—	2–0	0–3	0–2
Dinamo Zagreb	4–1	—	0–3	0–2
Osijek	4–1	3–1	—	1–1
Split	9–0	2–1	3–1	—

Updated to match(es) played on 21 May 2023. Source: HNS.hr
Legend: Blue = home team win; Yellow = draw; Red = away team win.
For upcoming matches, an "a" indicates there is an article about the rivalry between the two participants.

=== Relegation play-offs ===
==== League table ====
Pos	Team	Pld	W	D	L	GF	GA	GD	Pts	Qualification or relegation
5	Hajduk Split	20	12	3	5	70	22	+48	39	
6	Donat	20	6	2	12	41	54	−13	20	
7	Rijeka (R)	20	5	1	14	47	83	−36	16	Qualification to Relegation play-off
8	Viktorija (R)	20	0	0	20	3	197	−194	0	Relegation to 2. HNLŽ

Updated to match(es) played on 21 May 2023. Source: soccerway.com HNS.hr
Rules for classification: 1) Points; 2) Head-to-head points; 3) Head-to-head goal difference; 4) Head-to-head goals scored (at home if two teams tied); 5) Goal difference; 6) Goals scored; 7) Play-off
(Note: Criteria 2-4 and 7 is only used if deciding champion, teams to international competition or teams for relegation and in that case criteria 6 will not be used).
(R) Relegated

==== Results ====
Home \ Away	DON	HAJ	RIJ	VIK
Donat	—	0–0	2–1	13–0
Hajduk Split	3–2	—	2–0	11–1
Rijeka	6–1	2–5	—	7–0
Viktorija	0–5	0–4	0–6	—

Updated to match(es) played on 21 May 2023. Source: HNS.hr
Legend: Blue = home team win; Yellow = draw; Red = away team win.
For upcoming matches, an "a" indicates there is an article about the rivalry between the two participants.

==== Relegation play-off ====
At the end of the season, seventh placed Rijeka will contest a two-legged relegation play-off tie against the losing team of promotion play-off tie between Međimurje-Čakovec and Gorica.

===== First leg =====
28 May 2023

Međimurje-Čakovec	3–1	Rijeka
Škrlec 68', 72', 80'	Report	Terawaki 13'

SRC Mladost, Čakovec
Referee: Sabina Bolić

===== Second leg =====
4 June 2023
17:00

Rijeka	2–2	Međimurje-Čakovec
Bozhinovska 19'; Terawaki 53'	Report	Višnjić 47'; Varga 82'

Stadion Kantrida, Rijeka

Međimurje-Čakovec won 5–3 on aggregate.

== Top scorers ==
Updated to matches played on 21 May 2023.

Rank	Player	Club	Goals
1	(Croatia) Lorena Balić	Osijek	33
2	(Croatia) Izabela Lojna	Osijek	19
3	(Slovenia) Lara Ivanuša	Split	17
4	(Japan) Ayuri Terawaki	Rijeka	16
5	(Montenegro) Jasna Đoković	Split	15
6	(Bosnia and Herzegovina) Aida Hadžić	Split	14
7	(Croatia) Ana Dujmović	Agram	13
8	(Croatia) Roberta Savčić	Donat	12
9	(Croatia) Ivana Kirilenko	Donat	11
9	(Croatia) Karla Kurkutović	Dinamo Zagreb (4), Split (7)	11
9	(Croatia) Melani Mihić	Agram	11
9	(Croatia) Ema Šulentić	Rijeka	11
