= 2011–12 Croatian Women's First Football League =

Prva HNLŽ
- Season: 2011–12
- Champions: Osijek
- Relegated: Split
- Champions League: Osijek
- Matches: 80
- Goals: 343 (4.29 per match)
- Top goalscorer: Ana-Maria Kalamiza (34)
- Biggest home win: Osijek 18–0 Marjan
- Biggest away win: Marjan 0–9 Osijek
- Highest scoring: Osijek 18–0 Marjan
- All statistics correct as of 20 May 2012.

The 2011–12 Croatian Women's First Football League (Prva hrvatska nogometna liga za žene) was the 21st season of the Croatian Women's First Football League, the national championship for women's association football teams in Croatia, since its establishment in 1992. The season started on 28 August 2011 and ended on 20 May 2012.

The league was contested by eight teams and played in a two-stage format. The first stage was played in a double round robin format, with each team playing every other team two times over 14 rounds. In a second stage, teams were divided in two groups according to the table standings.

== Teams ==
Locations of teams in the 2011–12 Croatian Women's First Football League

== Regular season ==
=== Table ===
Pos	Team	Pld	W	D	L	GF	GA	GD	Pts	Qualification or relegation
1	Osijek	14	14	0	0	99	5	+94	42	Qualification for the Championship play-offs
2	Dinamo-Maksimir	14	10	1	3	45	17	+28	31	Qualification for the Championship play-offs
3	Agram	14	8	0	6	28	23	+5	24	Qualification for the Championship play-offs
4	Rijeka Jackpot	14	6	3	5	18	24	−6	21	Qualification for the Championship play-offs
5	Pregrada	14	4	2	8	13	39	−26	14	Qualification for the Relegation play-offs
6	Viktorija	14	4	1	9	29	38	−9	13	Qualification for the Relegation play-offs
7	Marjan	14	3	4	7	13	51	−38	13	Qualification for the Relegation play-offs
8	Split	14	0	3	11	8	56	−48	3	Qualification for the Relegation play-offs

Updated to match(es) played on 25 March 2012. Source: rsssf.com
Rules for classification: 1) points; 2) goal difference; 3) number of goals scored

=== Results ===
Home \ Away	AGR	DIN	MAR	OSI	PRE	RIJ	SPL	VIK
Agram	—	1–2	4–1	0–5	4–1	1–0	1–0	3–2
Dinamo-Maksimir	1–0	—	6–0	0–4	5–0	6–1	6–0	4–1
Marjan	0–4	3–0	—	0–9	1–0	2–2	1–1	0–2
Osijek	7–2	6–1	18–0	—	7–0	3–0	10–1	6–1
Pregrada	1–0	0–5	1–1	0–6	—	3–2	3–2	1–4
Rijeka Jackpot	1–0	1–1	1–0	0–6	2–1	—	1–1	3–0
Split	2–4	0–4	0–0	0–6	0–2	0–2	—	0–3
Viktorija	0–4	0–4	3–4	0–6	0–0	0–2	13–1	—

Updated to match(es) played on 25 March 2012. Source: rsssf.com
Legend: Blue = home team win; Yellow = draw; Red = away team win.
For upcoming matches, an "a" indicates there is an article about the rivalry between the two participants.

== Play-offs ==
=== Championship play-offs ===
==== League table ====
Pos	Team	Pld	W	D	L	GF	GA	GD	Pts	Qualification or relegation
1	Osijek	20	20	0	0	126	7	+119	60	Qualification to Champions League qualifying round
2	Dinamo-Maksimir	20	12	2	6	56	27	+29	38	
3	Agram	20	10	1	9	34	41	−7	31	
4	Rijeka Jackpot	20	7	3	10	24	44	−20	24	

Updated to match(es) played on 20 May 2012. Source: rsssf.com
Rules for classification: 1) points; 2) goal difference; 3) number of goals scored

==== Results ====
Home \ Away	AGR	DIN	OSI	RIJ
Agram	—	2–1	0–1	3–0
Dinamo-Maksimir	1–1	—	1–3	4–1
Osijek	11–0	3–0	—	1–0
Rijeka Jackpot	4–0	0–4	1–8	—

Updated to match(es) played on 20 May 2012. Source: rsssf.com
Legend: Blue = home team win; Yellow = draw; Red = away team win.
For upcoming matches, an "a" indicates there is an article about the rivalry between the two participants.

=== Relegation play-offs ===
==== League table ====
Pos	Team	Pld	W	D	L	GF	GA	GD	Pts	Qualification or relegation
5	Viktorija	20	8	2	10	44	42	+2	26	
6	Pregrada	20	7	3	10	25	45	−20	24	
7	Marjan	20	6	4	10	21	62	−41	22	
8	Split	20	1	3	16	13	75	−62	6	Relegation to 2. HNLŽ

Updated to match(es) played on 20 May 2012. Source: rsssf.com
Rules for classification: 1) points; 2) goal difference; 3) number of goals scored

==== Results ====
Home \ Away	VIK	PRE	MAR	SPL
Viktorija	—	4–0	3–0	4–1
Pregrada	0–0	—	4–1	4–0
Marjan	2–1	1–0	—	2–0
Split	1–3	0–4	3–2	—

Updated to match(es) played on 20 May 2012. Source: rsssf.com
Legend: Blue = home team win; Yellow = draw; Red = away team win.
For upcoming matches, an "a" indicates there is an article about the rivalry between the two participants.
