= Jyoti Chouhan =

Indian female footballer

Personal information
- Date of birth: 6 July 1999 (age 27)
- Place of birth: Madhya Pradesh, India
- Position: Striker

Team information
- Current team: Bnot Netanya

Senior career*
| Years | Team | Apps | (Gls) |
- DFA Dhar
| 2019–2020 | Kenkre | 6 | (2) |
- MUM- Footie First
| 2021–2022 | Gokulam Kerala | 8 | (3) |
| 2022–2024 | Dinamo Zagreb | 25 | (18) |
| 2025 | → Misaka United FC (loan) | | |
| 2025–2026 | East Bengal | 7 | (1) |
| 2026 | Gokulam Kerala | 1 | (0) |
| 2026- | Bnot Netanya | 0 | (0) |

International career^{‡}
| 2023– | India | 7 | (1) |
- * Club domestic league appearances and goals as of 9 January 2026 ‡ National team caps and goals as of 27 October 2024

Jyoti Chouhan (born 6 July 1999) is an Indian professional footballer who plays as a striker for the Ligat Nashim First Division club Bnot Netanya and the India national football team.

== Personal life ==
Chouhan's father died when she was twelve years old. Chouhan has four sisters. She is a native of Sardarpur, India.

== Club career ==
In 2022, Chouhan signed for Croatian side Dinamo Zagreb after doing well in the trials. She then helped the club winning the domestic league. She scored a hat-trick against Croatian side ZNK Agram, becoming the first Indian professional player to score a hat-trick for a European club. Previously, she played for Indian sides Kenkre and Gokulam Kerala, where she was regarded as one of the club's most important players.

== International career ==
Chouhan was called up to India women's national football team training camps in 2016 and 2018. She made her national team debut against Chinese Taipei at the 2022 Asian Games.

== Career statistics ==
=== International ===
As of 27 October 2024

| National team | Year | Caps | Goals |
|---|---|---|---|
| India | 2023 | 1 | 0 |
| India | 2024 | 6 | 1 |
| Total | | 7 | 1 |

=== International goals ===
| No. | Date | Venue | Opponent | Score | Result | Competition |
|---|---|---|---|---|---|---|
| 1. | 17 October 2024 | Dasharath Rangasala, Kathmandu, Nepal | Pakistan | 5–2 | 5–2 | 2024 SAFF Women's Championship |

== Honours ==
East Bengal

- SAFF Women's Club Championship: 2025

Gokulam Kerala

- Indian Women's League: 2021–22

Dinamo Zagreb

- Croatian Women's Football Cup: 2023–24; runner-up: 2022–23
