= Omar Newell =

Jamaican entrepreneur

Doctor Omar A Newell MP

Member of Parliament for Saint Mary Central
- Incumbent
- Assumed office 3 September 2025
- Preceded by: Morais Guy

Personal details
- Born: Omar Anthony Newell; 29 December 1981 (age 44) Port Maria, Jamaica
- Education: Northwestern University School of Law (JD); Monroe College in New York (BBA)
- Profession: Lawyer, Politician and Entrepreneur

Omar Anthony Newell (born 29 December 1981) is a Jamaican entrepreneur, radio broadcaster, newspaper columnist and public speaker. He used to be a law professor and legal consultant in New York.

In the 2025 Jamaican general election he was elected MP for Saint Mary Central.

== Early life ==
Newell was born in St. Mary, Jamaica, the first child of Lloyd Newell and Ioney Vassell. He lived there with his mother and step-father until he was 11 or 12 years old. At 10, Omar passed the Common Entrance examination and began studying at St. Mary High School, before moving to live with his grandmother in Portland and transferring to Titchfield High School in the parish capitol.

== Education ==
Newell holds a certificate in voice and speech for radio, television and platform from CPTC, a Bachelors in Business Administration from Monroe College in New York where he graduated on top of his class and a Juris Doctor from Northwestern University School of Law in Chicago, Illinois. While in law school, Omar traveled on research trips to Russia and his home country Jamaica to conduct research on capitalism and innovation.

== Career ==
Newell worked as assistant warehouse supervisor at a company owned by his father, then he worked in direct sales and as a teller at Jamaica's National Housing Trust. While at NHT, Newell ventured into journalism when he started a radio program at roots FM. After Monroe, Omar worked as a Business Manager at one of Manhattan's public relations firms.

While in the U.S., Newell served as a social and political commentator on several radio stations including WBEZ, Chicago Public Radio. After graduating from Northwestern, he began working as a business law professor in New York and a business law expert at a NY law firm, while producing several articles for Jamaican newspaper the Sunday Gleaner. Subsequent to his return to Jamaica, Newell became a co-host on the radio program, the Breakfast Club.

Newell's writings have focused on a wide range of issues including education and innovation. He has been profiled on several Jamaican programs including Profile with Ian Boyne and Smile Jamaica on Television Jamaica and Jamaican Mornings on Radio Jamaica.

In 2014 and 2015, Newell was the Director of Community Services for the National Youth Services.

He was also elected General Secretary of the Patriots, the young professionals' affiliate of the PNP; and in 2017 was appointed president. He became the People National Party's Candidate for Saint Mary Central after defeating Floyd Morris in a runoff on July 9, 2023.

In the 2025 Jamaican general election he was elected MP for Saint Mary Central.

== Philanthropy ==
While at NHT, Newell founded the "We Care" project which currently adopts and sends several needy Jamaican students to high school. In addition, he has supported hurricane relief efforts. In the aftermath of Hurricane Ivan, he organized a benefit which raised thousands of U.S. dollars for a relief organization. Omar received a public interest star from Northwestern for his volunteerism.

== See also ==
- 15th Parliament of Jamaica
