= Saint Mary Central =

Parliamentary constituency of Jamaica

Saint Mary Central is number 41 on this map.

Saint Mary Central is a parliamentary constituency represented in the Parliament of Jamaica. It elects one Member of Parliament by the first past the post system of election. The constituency covers the central part of Saint Mary Parish.

== Representation ==
| Election | Member | Party |
|---|---|---|
| 2002 | Morais Guy | People's National Party |
| 2025 | Omar Newell | People's National Party |
