= ŽNK Dinamo-Maksimir =

Croatian women's football club based in Zagreb

- Full name: Ženski nogometni klub Dinamo-Maksimir
- Founded: 1937; 88 years ago (as ŽNK Maksimir)
- Dissolved: 2016; 9 years ago (merged with ŽNK Dinamo Zagreb)
- Chairman: Vjekoslav Markotić
- Manager: Dražen Klarić
- League: First Division
| Home colours | Away colours |

ŽNK Dinamo-Maksimir was a Croatian women's football club based in Zagreb. The club was founded as ŽNK Maksimir in 1937. In 2016, the club merged with new entity named ŽNK Dinamo Zagreb.

== Honours ==
- Croatian First Division:
  - Winners (4): 1992, 2004, 2005, 2006
  - Runners-up (8): 1996, 1997, 1998, 2000, 2001, 2007, 2008, 2012
- Croatian Cup:
  - Winners (6): 1992, 1993, 2003, 2004, 2005, 2006
  - Runners-up (3): 2008, 2012, 2013
- Yugoslav First Division:
  - Winners (3): 1981, 1982, 1991
- Yugoslav Cup:
  - Winners (4): 1980, 1982, 1987, 1990

== Recent seasons ==
| Season | Division | P | W | D | L | F | A | Pts | Pos | Cup | Player | Goals |
| Season | League | | | | | | | | | Cup | Top goalscorer | |
|---|---|---|---|---|---|---|---|---|---|---|---|---|
| 2001–02 | 1. HNLŽ | 14 | 4 | 1 | 9 | 28 | 42 | 13 | 7th | | | |
| 2002–03 | 1. HNLŽ | 14 | 9 | 2 | 3 | 34 | 19 | 29 | 3rd | W | | |
| 2003–04 | 1. HNLŽ | 14 | 12 | 2 | 0 | 64 | 8 | 38 | 1st | W | | |
| 2004–05 | 1. HNLŽ | 18 | 17 | 1 | 0 | 111 | 7 | 52 | 1st | W | | |
| 2005–06 | 1. HNLŽ | 16 | 15 | 1 | 0 | 134 | 4 | 46 | 1st | W | | |
| 2006–07 | 1. HNLŽ | 20 | 16 | 1 | 3 | 131 | 19 | 49 | 2nd | | | |
| 2007–08 | 1. HNLŽ | 18 | 15 | 1 | 2 | 93 | 14 | 46 | 2nd | RU | | |
| 2008–09 | 1. HNLŽ | 20 | 12 | 2 | 6 | 56 | 44 | 37 | 3rd | | | |
| 2009–10 | 1. HNLŽ | 20 | 6 | 2 | 12 | 32 | 46 | 20 | 4th | | | |
| 2010–11 | 1. HNLŽ | 20 | 10 | 1 | 9 | 29 | 25 | 31 | 3rd | | | |
| 2011–12 | 1. HNLŽ | 20 | 12 | 2 | 6 | 56 | 27 | 37 | 2nd | RU | | |
| 2012–13 | 1. HNLŽ | 18 | 6 | 3 | 9 | 33 | 45 | 21 | 5th | RU | | |
| 2013–14 | 1. HNLŽ | 21 | 10 | 0 | 11 | 45 | 63 | 30 | 4th | | Sandra Žigić | 11 |
| 2014–15 | 1. HNLŽ | 17 | 11 | 1 | 5 | 55 | 31 | 32 | 3rd | | | |
| 2015–16 | 1. HNLŽ | 18 | 4 | 1 | 13 | 30 | 57 | 7 | 10th | | Tomislava Matijević | 15 |

== European record ==
=== Summary ===
| Competition | Pld | W | D | L | GF | GA | Last season played |
|---|---|---|---|---|---|---|---|
| UEFA Women's Cup | 9 | 1 | 0 | 8 | 11 | 29 | 2006–07 |

=== By season ===
| Season | Competition | Round | Opponent | Home | Away | Agg |
|---|---|---|---|---|---|---|
| 2004–05 | UEFA Women's Cup | QGS | (Scotland) Hibernian | 0–5 | | 4th out of 4 |
| 2004–05 | UEFA Women's Cup | QGS | (Serbia and Montenegro) Mašinac Niš | 0–2 | | 4th out of 4 |
| 2004–05 | UEFA Women's Cup | QGS | (Belgium) Rapide Wezemaal | 0–2 | | 4th out of 4 |
| 2005–06 | UEFA Women's Cup | QGS | (Italy) Bardolino Verona | 0–3 | | 4th out of 4 |
| 2005–06 | UEFA Women's Cup | QGS | (Austria) Neulengbach | 1–5 | | 4th out of 4 |
| 2005–06 | UEFA Women's Cup | QGS | (Republic of Ireland) UCD | 0–2 | | 4th out of 4 |
| 2006–07 | UEFA Women's Cup | QGS | (Netherlands) Saestum | 0–7 | | 3rd out of 4 |
| 2006–07 | UEFA Women's Cup | QGS | (Wales) Cardiff City Ladies | 2–3 | | 3rd out of 4 |
| 2006–07 | UEFA Women's Cup | QGS | (Republic of Ireland) Dundalk | 8–0 | | 3rd out of 4 |
