= Marija Damjanović =

Bosnia and Herzegovina footballer

Personal information
- Full name: Marija Damjanović
- Date of birth: 16 August 2000 (age 26)
- Place of birth: Bosnia and Herzegovina,
- Position: Forward

Team information
- Current team: Lokomotiva

Senior career*
Years	Team	Apps	(Gls)
- Lokomotiva

International career^{‡}
2016–2017	Bosnia and Herzegovina U17	6	(0)
2017–2018	Bosnia and Herzegovina U19	6	(1)
2019–	Bosnia and Herzegovina	4	(1)
- * Club domestic league appearances and goals ‡ National team caps and goals as of 10 March 2020

Marija Damjanović (born 16 August 2000) is a Bosnia and Herzegovina footballer who plays as a forward for Ženska Premijer Liga BiH club ZFK Lokomotiva Brčko and the Bosnia and Herzegovina women's national team.
