= ŽNK Ombla =

- Full name: Ženski nogometni klub Ombla
- Founded: 1999
- Ground: Stadion Lapad
- Capacity: 3,000
- League: Croatian Second Division
Home colours	Away colours

ŽNK Ombla is a Croatian women's association football club based in Dubrovnik. The club was founded in 1999 and they currently compete in the Croatian Second Division.
