= Maja Joščak =

Croatian footballer (born 1990)

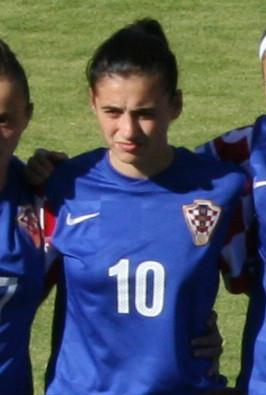

Personal information
- Full name: Maja Joščak
- Date of birth: 4 August 1990 (age 36)
- Place of birth: SFR Yugoslavia
- Position: Forward

Team information
- Current team: Osijek
- Number: 8

Senior career*
Years	Team	Apps	(Gls)
2010–	Osijek	154	(190)

International career^{‡}
2006–2007	Croatia U19	12	(1)
2006–2019	Croatia	71	(20)
- * Club domestic league appearances and goals as of 13:59, 18 September 2015 (UTC) ‡ National team caps and goals as of 13:59, 18 September 2015 (UTC)

Maja Joščak (born 4 August 1990) is a Croatian football forward, who plays for ŽNK Osijek.

== International career ==
She was part of the U19 national team, and a member of the Croatia women's national football team.

== Honours ==
Osijek

Winner

- Croatian First Division (5): 2010–11, 2011–12, 2012–13, 2013–14, 2014–15
