= Carinthians Soccer Women =

Carinthians Spittal/Drau
- Full name: Carinthians Soccer Women
- Founded: June 2013; 12 years ago
- Ground: Goldeckstadion, Goldeckstadion
- Capacity: 1000
- Manager: Wolfgang Wilscher
- League: ÖFB-Frauenliga
- 2022–2023: 8. Platz
- Website: http://www.carinthians.com/
Home colours

Carinthians Soccer Women is an Austrian women's association football club based in Glanegg, a municipality in the district of Feldkirchen in Kärnten, Carinthia. Since 2015 they have played in ÖFB-Frauenliga, the top division of women's football in Austria. The club is known for its cantera policy of bringing young Carinthian players through the ranks, as well as recruiting top Carinthian players from other clubs. Soccer Women official policy is signing players native to or trained in football in the greater Carinthia region, including the Austrian state; and Slovenian Carinthia.

== History ==
Carinthians Soccer Women was founded as a new independent football club in June 2013. Before this there had been a local women's team who played under the aegis of SK Austria Kärnten, then FC St. Veit. The squad was augmented with players from nearby Slovenia, who received travel expenses; unlike the rest of the team who remained amateur.

In 2015 the club finished second in 2. Liga Ost/Süd but qualified for a promotion play-off as the first-placed team, SV Neulengbach's reserves, were not eligible to play in the top division alongside the Neulengbach first team. Carinthians then beat 2. Liga Mitte/West winners SG FC Bergheim/USK Hof to secure their place in the 2015–16 ÖFB-Frauenliga.

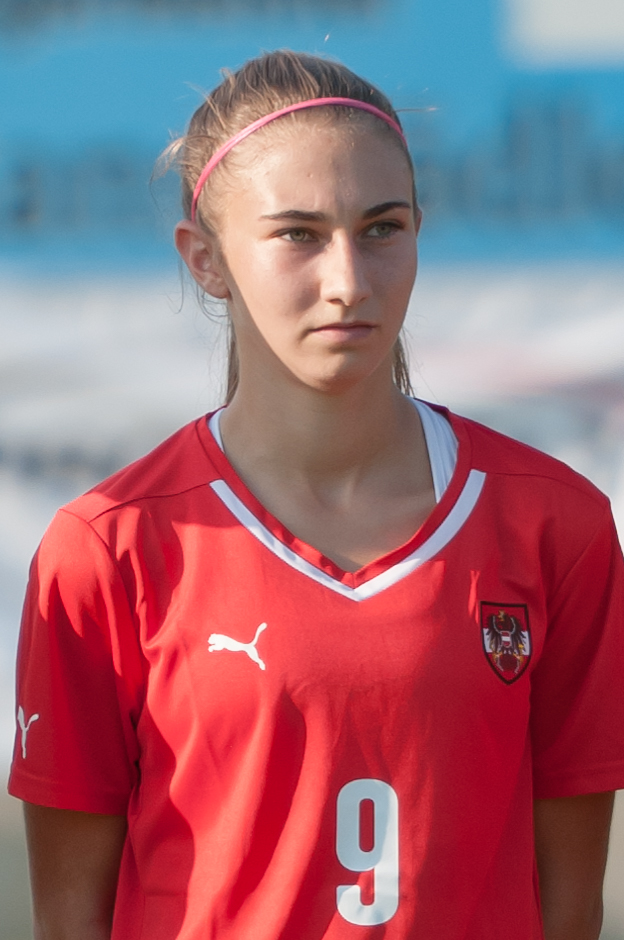
Katharina Naschenweng playing for Austria U-19s in May 2015
