= ŽNK Donat =

- Full name: Ženski nogometni klub Donat-Zadar
- Founded: 2015; 11 years ago
- Ground: Stadion Stanovi
- Manager: Jure Perković
- League: 2nd Division
Home colours	Away colours

ŽNK Donat is a Croatian women's association football club based in Zadar. The club was founded in 2015 and it currently competes in the 2nd Division.

== Recent seasons ==
Season	Division	P	W	D	L	F	A	Pts	Pos	Cup	Player	Goals
Season	League									Cup	Top goalscorer	
2017–18	2. HNLŽ South	8	0	0	8	10	47	0	3rd	DNP	Paula Bačić	5
2018–19	2. HNLŽ South	League not played								R16	—N/a	—N/a
2019–20	2. HNLŽ North-South	7	6	0	1	46	6	18	1st	QF	Paula Bačić	12
2020–21	1. HNLŽ	20	11	1	8	49	38	34	5th	R16	Petra Barbir, Sara Ivandić	8
2021–22	1. HNLŽ	20	4	1	15	31	76	13	7th	QF	Roberta Savčić	7
2022–23	1. HNLŽ	20	6	2	12	41	54	20	6th	SF	Roberta Savčić	12
