= ŽNK Osijek =

Women's football club (founded in 1990)

- Full name: Ženski nogometni klub Osijek
- Founded: 1990; 36 years ago
- Ground: Gradski Vrt Stadium
- Capacity: 17,061
- Chairman: Bojan Bodražić
- League: First Division
- 2025–26: 5th
- Website: www.znk-osijek.hr
Home colours	Away colours

ŽNK Osijek is a Croatian professional women's football based in Osijek. It is the women's section of NK Osijek. It was founded in 1990 and is the most successful team in Croatian women's football with 24 Croatian championship titles. The 2010–11 title was won without dropping a single point in all of their 20 league games; last such success was in the season 2001–02. They also won the Croatian Women's Football Cup 19 times out of 31 editions.

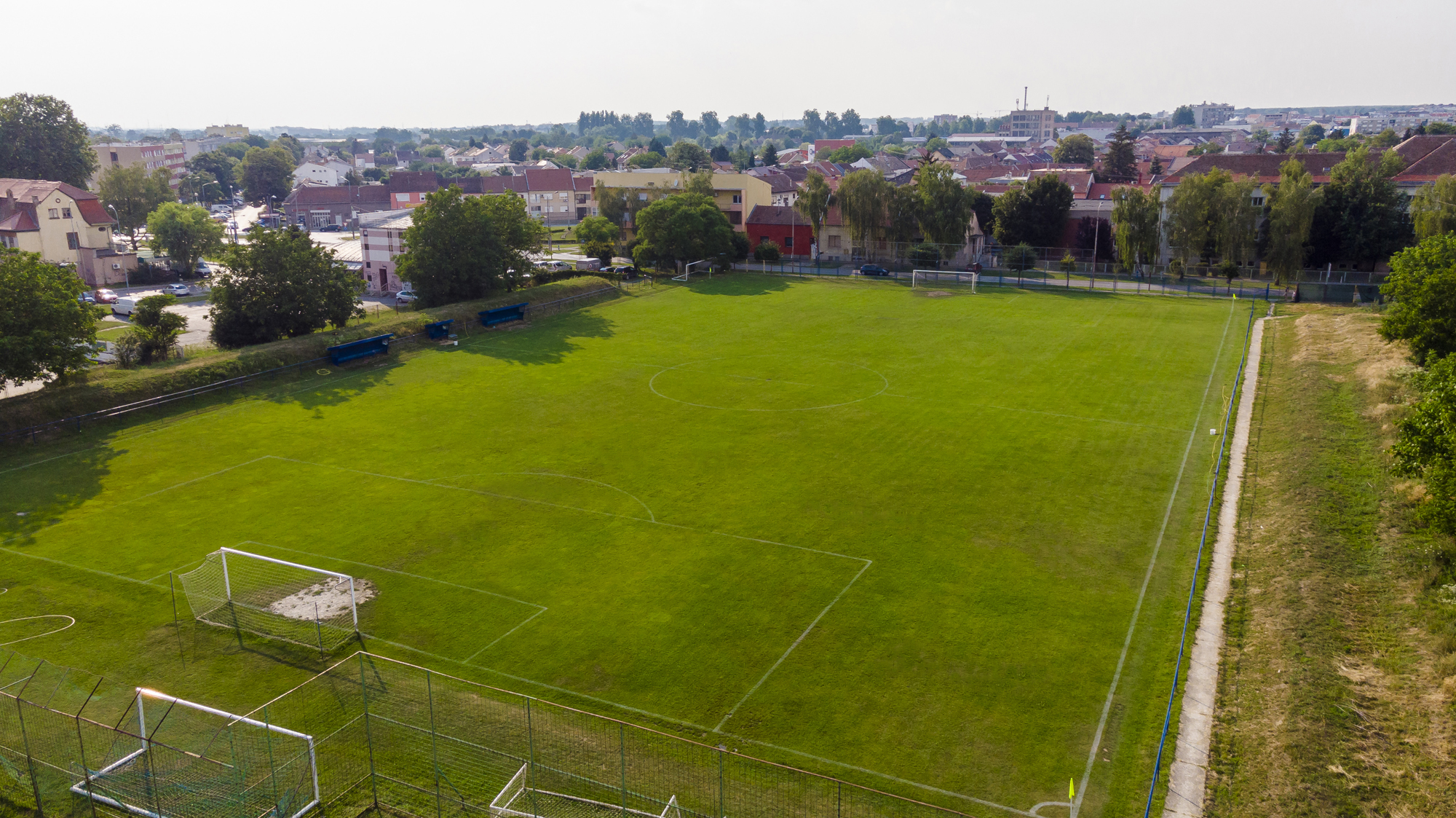
Football field Mačkamama

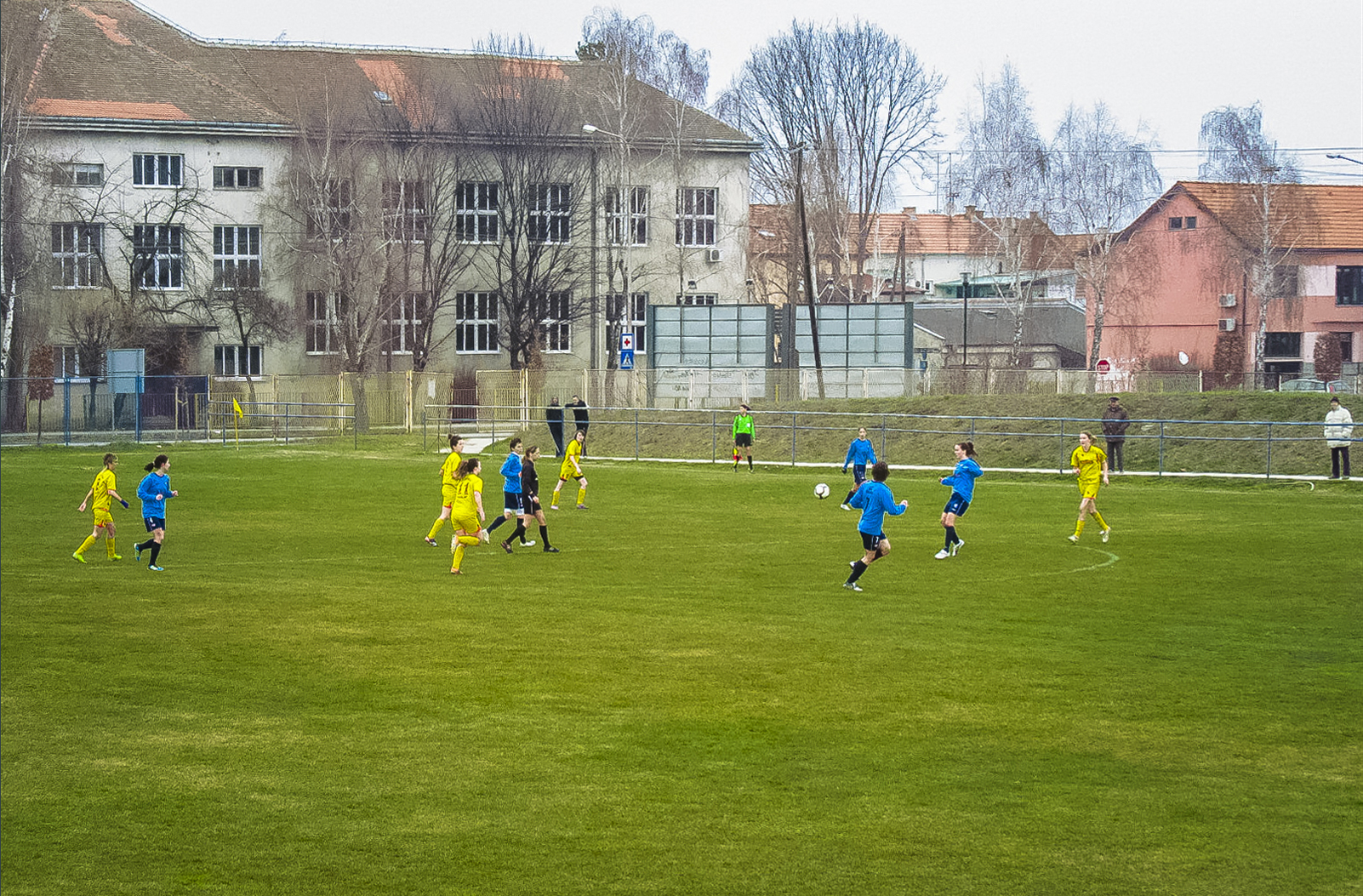
ŽNK Osijek in 2012

== Honours ==
- Croatian First Division:
  - Winners (24): 1994 to 2003, 2007 to 2018, 2021, 2023
  - Runners-up (5): 1993, 2004, 2019, 2020, 2022
- Croatian Cup:
  - Winners (19): 1995 to 2002, 2007 to 2017
  - Runners-up (7): 2003, 2004, 2006, 2019, 2021, 2022, 2024

== Recent seasons ==
Season	Division	P	W	D	L	F	A	Pts	Pos	Cup	Player	Goals
Season	League									Cup	Top goalscorer	
2001–02	1. HNLŽ	14	14	0	0	94	5	42	1st	W		
2002–03	1. HNLŽ	14	12	0	2	74	12	36	1st	RU		
2003–04	1. HNLŽ	14	10	2	2	60	15	32	2nd	RU		
2004–05	1. HNLŽ	18	12	1	5	61	27	37	3rd	SF		
2005–06	1. HNLŽ	16	11	2	3	80	12	35	3rd	RU		
2006–07	1. HNLŽ	20	19	1	0	110	13	58	1st	W		
2007–08	1. HNLŽ	18	15	2	1	63	14	47	1st	W		
2008–09	1. HNLŽ	20	17	3	0	100	10	54	1st	W		
2009–10	1. HNLŽ	20	17	1	2	92	15	52	1st	W		
2010–11	1. HNLŽ	20	20	0	0	103	12	60	1st	W		
2011–12	1. HNLŽ	20	20	0	0	126	7	60	1st	W	Ana Marija Kalamiza	34
2012–13	1. HNLŽ	18	18	0	0	173	5	54	1st	W	Maja Joščak	39
2013–14	1. HNLŽ	21	21	0	0	180	6	63	1st	W	Mateja Andrlić	43
2014–15	1. HNLŽ	17	17	0	0	143	4	51	1st	W	Mateja Andrlić	32
2015–16	1. HNLŽ	18	17	1	0	147	3	52	1st	W	Izabela Lojna	28
2016–17	1. HNLŽ	18	18	0	0	157	2	54	1st	W	Mateja Andrlić	39
2017–18	1. HNLŽ	18	18	0	0	209	2	54	1st	QF	Lorena Balić	61
2018–19	1. HNLŽ	18	16	1	1	117	9	49	2nd	RU	Lorena Balić	24
2019–20	1. HNLŽ	20	18	0	2	135	16	54	2nd	SF	Lorena Balić	42
2020–21	1. HNLŽ	20	16	4	0	136	11	52	1st	RU	Lorena Balić	44
2021–22	1. HNLŽ	20	15	2	3	132	14	47	2nd	RU	Lorena Balić	33
2022–23	1. HNLŽ	20	18	1	1	105	10	55	1st	QF	Lorena Balić	33
2023–24	1. HNLŽ	20	18	2	0	108	10	56	1st	RU	Lorena Balić	28

== European record ==
=== Summary ===
Competition	Pld	W	D	L	GF	GA	Last season played
Champions League	62	20	7	35	134	182	2024–25

=== By season ===
Season	Competition	Round	Opponent	Home	Away	Agg
2001–02	UEFA Women's Cup	GS	(Scotland) Ayr United	3–3		4th out of 4
2001–02	UEFA Women's Cup	GS	(France) Toulouse	0–6		4th out of 4
2001–02	UEFA Women's Cup	GS	(Ukraine) Lehenda-Cheksil	2–3		4th out of 4
2002–03	UEFA Women's Cup	GS	(Republic of Ireland) Shamrock Rovers	1–3		4th out of 4
2002–03	UEFA Women's Cup	GS	(Germany) Frankfurt	0–8		4th out of 4
2002–03	UEFA Women's Cup	GS	(Federal Republic of Yugoslavia) Mašinac Niš	0–6		4th out of 4
2003–04	UEFA Women's Cup	QGS^{*}	(Bosnia and Herzegovina) SFK 2000	3–0		1st out of 4
2003–04	UEFA Women's Cup	QGS^{*}	(Kazakhstan) Temir Zholy	2–1		1st out of 4
2003–04	UEFA Women's Cup	QGS^{*}	(Wales) Cardiff City Ladies	2–4		1st out of 4
2003–04	UEFA Women's Cup	GS	(Italy) Foroni Verona	0–10		4th out of 4
2003–04	UEFA Women's Cup	GS	(Hungary) Femina	3–3		4th out of 4
2003–04	UEFA Women's Cup	GS	(Russia) Energy Voronezh	0–13		4th out of 4
2007–08	UEFA Women's Cup	QGS^{*}	(Portugal) 1º de Dezembro	0–7		3rd out of 4
2007–08	UEFA Women's Cup	QGS^{*}	(Belgium) Rapide Wezemaal	0–2		3rd out of 4
2007–08	UEFA Women's Cup	QGS^{*}	(Wales) Cardiff City Ladies	2–1		3rd out of 4
2008–09	UEFA Women's Cup	QGS^{*}	(Kazakhstan) Alma	1–3		3rd out of 4
2008–09	UEFA Women's Cup	QGS^{*}	(Romania) Clujana	1–3		3rd out of 4
2008–09	UEFA Women's Cup	QGS^{*}	(Northern Ireland) Glentoran Ladies	1–1		3rd out of 4
2009–10	UEFA Women's Champions League	QGS^{*}	(England) Everton	1–3		4th out of 4
2009–10	UEFA Women's Champions League	QGS^{*}	(Norway) Team Strømmen	0–9		4th out of 4
2009–10	UEFA Women's Champions League	QGS^{*}	(Estonia) Levadia Tallinn	1–4		4th out of 4
2010–11	UEFA Women's Champions League	QGS^{*}	(Russia) Rossiyanka	0–5		4th out of 4
2010–11	UEFA Women's Champions League	QGS^{*}	(Portugal) 1º de Dezembro	1–4		4th out of 4
2010–11	UEFA Women's Champions League	QGS^{*}	(Republic of Ireland) St Francis	3–5		4th out of 4
2011–12	UEFA Women's Champions League	QGS^{*}	(Bulgaria) NSA Sofia	1–1		1st out of 4
2011–12	UEFA Women's Champions League	QGS^{*}	(Belarus) Bobruichanka	1–0		1st out of 4
2011–12	UEFA Women's Champions League	QGS^{*}	(Northern Ireland) Newtownabbey Strikers	5–1		1st out of 4
2011–12	UEFA Women's Champions League	R32	(Sweden) Göteborg	0–4	0–7	0–11
2012–13	UEFA Women's Champions League	QGS	(Scotland) Glasgow City	2–3		3rd out of 4
2012–13	UEFA Women's Champions League	QGS	(Finland) PK-35 Vantaa	1–3		3rd out of 4
2012–13	UEFA Women's Champions League	QGS	(Moldova) Noroc Nimoreni	11–1		3rd out of 4
2013–14	UEFA Women's Champions League	QGS	(Scotland) Glasgow City	0–7		3rd out of 4
2013–14	UEFA Women's Champions League	QGS	(Netherlands) Twente	0–4		3rd out of 4
2013–14	UEFA Women's Champions League	QGS	(Malta) Birkirkara	7–1		3rd out of 4
2014–15	UEFA Women's Champions League	QGS^{*}	(Moldova) Goliador Chişinău	12–0		1st out of 4
2014–15	UEFA Women's Champions League	QGS^{*}	(Greece) Amazones Dramas	3–1		1st out of 4
2014–15	UEFA Women's Champions League	QGS^{*}	(Serbia) Spartak Subotica	1–0		1st out of 4
2014–15	UEFA Women's Champions League	R32	(Switzerland) Zürich	2–5	0–2	2–7
2015–16	UEFA Women's Champions League	QGS^{*}	(Moldova) Noroc Nimoreni	4–0		3rd out of 4
2015–16	UEFA Women's Champions League	QGS^{*}	(Portugal) Benfica	0–3		3rd out of 4
2015–16	UEFA Women's Champions League	QGS^{*}	(Serbia) Spartak Subotica	0–3		3rd out of 4
2016–17	UEFA Women's Champions League	QGS^{*}	(North Macedonia) Dragon 2014	14–1		3rd out of 4
2016–17	UEFA Women's Champions League	QGS^{*}	(Belarus) FC Minsk	0–5		3rd out of 4
2016–17	UEFA Women's Champions League	QGS^{*}	(Belgium) Standard Liège	1–1		3rd out of 4
2017–18	UEFA Women's Champions League	QGS^{*}	(North Macedonia) Istatov	7–0		2nd out of 4
2017–18	UEFA Women's Champions League	QGS^{*}	(Faroe Islands) KÍ Klaksvík	4–0		2nd out of 4
2017–18	UEFA Women's Champions League	QGS^{*}	(Iceland) Stjarnan	0–1		2nd out of 4
2018–19	UEFA Women's Champions League	QGS^{*}	(North Macedonia) Dragon 2014	13–0		3rd out of 4
2018–19	UEFA Women's Champions League	QGS^{*}	(Portugal) Sporting CP	0–3		3rd out of 4
2018–19	UEFA Women's Champions League	QGS^{*}	(Norway) Avaldsnes	2–2		3rd out of 4
2021–22	UEFA Women's Champions League	QR1^{*}	(Montenegro) Breznica Pljevlja	5–0		1st out of 4
2021–22	UEFA Women's Champions League	QR1^{*}	(Belgium) Anderlecht	1–0		1st out of 4
2021–22	UEFA Women's Champions League	QR2	(Iceland) Breiðablik	1–1	0–3	1–4
2023–24	UEFA Women's Champions League	QR1	(Bosnia and Herzegovina) SFK 2000	4–0		2nd out of 4
2023–24	UEFA Women's Champions League	QR1	(Ukraine) Vorskla Poltava	0–3		2nd out of 4
2024–25	UEFA Women's Champions League	QR1^{*}	(Slovakia) Spartak Myjava	2–0		1st out of 4
2024–25	UEFA Women's Champions League	QR1^{*}	(Republic of Ireland) Peamount	2–1		1st out of 4
2024–25	UEFA Women's Champions League	QR2	(Netherlands) Twente	1–4	0–4	1–8

=== Record by country ===
ŽNK Osijek record in European football by country
Country	Pld	W	D	L	GF	GA	GD	Win%
Belarus	2	1	0	1	1	5	−4	50.00
Belgium	3	1	1	1	2	3	−1	33.33
Bosnia and Herzegovina	2	2	0	0	7	0	+7	100.00
Bulgaria	1	0	1	0	1	1	+0	0.00
England	1	0	0	1	1	3	−2	0.00
Estonia	1	0	0	1	1	4	−3	0.00
Faroe Islands	1	1	0	0	4	0	+4	100.00
Finland	1	0	0	1	1	3	−2	0.00
France	1	0	0	1	0	6	−6	0.00
Germany	1	0	0	1	0	8	−8	0.00
Greece	1	1	0	0	3	1	+2	100.00
Hungary	1	0	1	0	3	3	+0	0.00
Iceland	3	0	1	2	1	5	−4	0.00
Ireland	3	1	0	2	6	9	−3	33.33
Italy	1	0	0	1	0	10	−10	0.00
Kazakhstan	2	1	0	1	3	4	−1	50.00
Macedonia	3	3	0	0	34	1	+33	100.00
Malta	1	1	0	0	7	1	+6	100.00
Moldova	3	3	0	0	27	1	+26	100.00
Montenegro	1	1	0	0	5	0	+5	100.00
Netherlands	3	0	0	3	1	12	−11	0.00
Northern Ireland	2	1	1	0	6	2	+4	50.00
Norway	2	0	1	1	2	11	−9	0.00
Portugal	4	0	0	4	1	17	−16	0.00
Romania	1	0	0	1	1	3	−2	0.00
Russia	2	0	0	2	0	18	−18	0.00
Scotland	3	0	1	2	5	13	−8	0.00
Serbia	2	1	0	1	1	3	−2	50.00
Slovakia	1	1	0	0	2	0	+2	100.00
Sweden	2	0	0	2	0	11	−11	0.00
Switzerland	2	0	0	2	2	7	−5	0.00
Ukraine	2	0	0	2	2	6	−4	0.00
FR Yugoslavia	1	0	0	1	0	6	−6	0.00
Wales	2	1	0	1	4	5	−1	50.00

== Current squad ==
As of 16 June 2025

Note: Flags indicate national team as defined under FIFA eligibility rules; some limited exceptions apply. Players may hold more than one non-FIFA nationality.

No.	Pos.	Nation	Player
1	GK	GRE	Ariana Anastasiadis
2	MF	CRO	Klara Žuljević
3	DF	CRO	Mateja Bulut
4	MF	USA	Lindsey Porter
5	FW	CRO	Lea Maričić
6	DF	DOM	Lynette Ureña
9	FW	CRO	Lorena Balić
11	DF	CRO	Barbara Živković

No.	Pos.	Nation	Player
12	GK	CRO	Nina Radaković
13	FW	CRO	Mateja Andrlić
16	MF	CRO	Ivana Kirilenko
17	FW	CRO	Ena Pernar
18	MF	SVK	Tereza Bednárová
19	FW	CRO	Paula Petković
21	DF	PUR	Madison Cox
23	DF	PUR	Verónica García
