= 2027 FIFA Women's World Cup qualification – UEFA League C =

Tournament details
- Dates: 3 March – 9 June 2026
- Teams: 21

Tournament statistics
- Matches played: 54
- Goals scored: 181 (3.35 per match)
- Attendance: 20,854 (386 per match)
- Top scorer(s): (Lithuania) Rimantė Jonušaitė (6 goals)
- Women's Nations League Women's World Cup qualifying

League C of the Women's European Qualifiers will determine eight of the teams to advance to the play-off phase.

== Format ==
The teams ranked 33–53 in the 2025 UEFA Women's Nations League overall phase ranking were drawn into three groups of four teams each and three groups of three teams each. Each group will be contested in a league format where each team plays each other team at home and away.

Group winners and the two highest-ranked runners-up will advance to the play-off phase. In addition, the six group winners will be promoted to League B for the following 2027 UEFA Women's Nations League.

=== Schedule ===
The match schedule will be as follows:

Matchday	Date
Matchday 1	3 March 2026
Matchday 2	7 March 2026
Matchday 3	14 April 2026
Matchday 4	18 April 2026
Matchday 5	5 June 2026
Matchday 6	9 June 2026

== Seeding ==
Teams were allocated to League C according to the 2025 Women's Nations League overall phase rankings and were seeded into three pots of six teams and one pot of three teams. The draw for the league phase took place on 4 November 2025 at 13:00 CET.

Pot 1
Team	Rank
Bosnia and Herzegovina	33
Hungary	34
Romania	35
Belarus	36
Croatia	37
Greece	38

Pot 2
Team	Rank
Cyprus (Note: Cyprus and Kosovo participated in the League B vs League C promotion/relegation matches in October 2025 to determine each team's league allocation.)	39
Kosovo	40
Azerbaijan	41
Faroe Islands	42
Kazakhstan	43
Estonia	44

Pot 3
Team	Rank
Lithuania	45
Armenia	46
Bulgaria	47
Moldova	48
North Macedonia	49
Georgia	50

Pot 4
Team	Rank
Andorra	51
Liechtenstein	52
Gibraltar	53

== Groups ==
The fixture list was confirmed by UEFA following the draw. Times are CET/CEST, (Note: CET (UTC+1) for matches until 29 March 2026 (matchdays 1–2), and CEST (UTC+2) for matches thereafter (matchdays 3–6).) as listed by UEFA (local times, if different, are in parentheses).

=== Group C1 ===
Pos	Team	Pld	W	D	L	GF	GA	GD	Pts	Promotion or qualification	(Lithuania)	(Bosnia and Herzegovina)	(Estonia)	(Liechtenstein)
1	Lithuania (P)	6	3	2	1	11	3	+8	11 (Note: Tied on head-to-head points (5). Ranked on goal difference in head-to-head matches: Lithuania +1, Bosnia and Herzegovina 0, Estonia -1.)	Advance to play-offs and promotion to League B	—	2–0	0–0	2–0
2	Bosnia and Herzegovina	6	3	2	1	23	5	+18	11		0–0	—	3–1	13–1
3	Estonia	6	3	2	1	11	6	+5	11		2–1	1–1	—	2–1
4	Liechtenstein	6	0	0	6	3	34	−31	0		1–6	0–6	0–5	—

Source: UEFA
Rules for classification: Tiebreakers
(P) Promoted
Notes:
3 March 2026
13:00

Bosnia and Herzegovina	3–1	Estonia
Milinković 36'; Šabanagić 45+3'; Grebenar 88'	Report (FIFA); Report (UEFA)	Räämet 41' (pen.)

FF BH Football Training Centre, Zenica
Attendance: 100
Referee: Karoline Marie Jensen (Norway)
3 March 2026
19:00

Liechtenstein	1–6	Lithuania
Risch 30'	Report (FIFA); Report (UEFA)	Jonušaitė 3', 64', 77', 83'; Lazdauskaitė 43'; Petrauskaitė 90+1'

Rheinpark Stadion, Vaduz
Attendance: 604
Referee: Teresa Oliveira (Portugal)

7 March 2026
13:00

Bosnia and Herzegovina	13–1	Liechtenstein
Milinković 6'; Frick 9' (o.g.); Hamzić 15'; Nikolić 17', 31'; M. Hasanbegović 24'; Ekić 33', 35'; Aleksić 45' (pen.); Grebenar 45+3'; Gačanica 58'; Rankić 66' (pen.); Crnoja 83' (pen.)	Report (FIFA); Report (UEFA)	Göppel 13'

FF BH Football Training Centre, Zenica
Attendance: 100
Referee: Asen Albayrak (Turkey)
7 March 2026
16:00 (17:00 UTC+2)

Lithuania	0–0	Estonia
	Report (FIFA); Report (UEFA)

Raudondvario stadionas, Raudondvaris
Attendance: 587
Referee: Marina Živković (Serbia)

14 April 2026
17:00 (18:00 UTC+3)

Estonia	2–1	Liechtenstein
Kubassova 44' (pen.); Kirpu 84'	Report (FIFA); Report (UEFA)	Steck 50'

Lilleküla Stadium, Tallinn
Attendance: 502
Referee: Rita Vehapi (Kosovo)
14 April 2026
17:00 (18:00 UTC+3)

Lithuania	2–0	Bosnia and Herzegovina
Jonušaitė 62', 73'	Report (FIFA); Report (UEFA)

LSC Druskininkai Stadium, Druskininkai
Attendance: 183
Referee: Audrey Gerbel (France)

18 April 2026
16:00 (17:00 UTC+3)

Estonia	2–1	Lithuania
Lillemäe 42'; Tammik 90+3'	Report (FIFA); Report (UEFA)	Švarcaitė 30'

Lilleküla Stadium, Tallinn
Attendance: 487
Referee: Asen Albayrak (Turkey)
18 April 2026
16:00

Liechtenstein	0–6	Bosnia and Herzegovina
	Report (FIFA); Report (UEFA)	Nikolić 5', 24', 35'; Kapetanović 6'; Milinković 9'; Ekić 64'

Rheinpark Stadion, Vaduz
Attendance: 764
Referee: Frederikke Lydia Søkjær (Denmark)

5 June 2026
17:00

Bosnia and Herzegovina	0–0	Lithuania
	Report (FIFA); Report (UEFA)

FF BH Football Training Centre, Zenica
Attendance: 180
Referee: Minka Vekkeli (Finland)
5 June 2026
19:00

Liechtenstein	0–5	Estonia
	Report (FIFA); Report (UEFA)	Kubassova 6'; Kirpu 29'; Tammik 50'; Merisalu 60'; Teern 83'

Rheinpark Stadion, Vaduz
Attendance: 695
Referee: Araksya Saribekyan (Armenia)

9 June 2026
19:00 (20:00 UTC+3)

Estonia	1–1	Bosnia and Herzegovina
Kubassova 10'	Report (FIFA); Report (UEFA)	Hasanbegović 23'

Pärnu Rannastaadion, Pärnu
Attendance: 288
Referee: Michaela Pachtová (Czech Republic)
9 June 2026
19:00 (20:00 UTC+3)

Lithuania	2–0	Liechtenstein
Lazdauskaitė 7'; Vaitukaitytė 50'	Report (FIFA); Report (UEFA)

LSC Druskininkai Stadium, Druskininkai
Attendance: 255
Referee: Lena Hirtl (Austria)

=== Group C2 ===
Pos	Team	Pld	W	D	L	GF	GA	GD	Pts	Promotion or qualification	(Kosovo)	(Croatia)	(Bulgaria)	(Gibraltar)
1	Kosovo (P)	6	5	0	1	20	3	+17	15	Advance to play-offs and promotion to League B	—	0–1	2–1	6–0
2	Croatia	6	5	0	1	16	1	+15	15	Advance to play-offs	0–1	—	4–0	9–0
3	Bulgaria	6	2	0	4	10	11	−1	6		1–3	0–1	—	3–1
4	Gibraltar	6	0	0	6	1	32	−31	0		0–8	0–1	0–5	—

Source: UEFA
Rules for classification: Tiebreakers
(P) Promoted
3 March 2026
11:00 (12:00 UTC+2)

Bulgaria	0–1	Croatia
	Report (FIFA); Report (UEFA)	Vunić 80'

Stadion Aleksandar Shalamanov, Sofia
Attendance: 310
Referee: Araksya Saribekyan (Armenia)
3 March 2026
17:00

Kosovo	6–0	Gibraltar
Biqkaj 4'; Sahiti 26'; Uka 63'; Memeti 72'; Fetaj 76', 87'	Report (FIFA); Report (UEFA)

Fadil Vokrri Stadium, Pristina
Attendance: 100
Referee: Oxana Cruc (Moldova)

7 March 2026
17:00

Croatia	0–1	Kosovo
	Report (FIFA); Report (UEFA)	Uka 13'

Stadion Branko Čavlović-Čavlek, Karlovac
Attendance: 200
Referee: Lovisa Johansson (Sweden)
7 March 2026
19:00

Gibraltar	0–5	Bulgaria
	Report (FIFA); Report (UEFA)	Borrell 2' (o.g.); Rasina 39'; D. Ivanova 84', 85'; I. Naydenova 90+4'

Europa Sports Park, Gibraltar
Attendance: 361
Referee: Laura Mauricio (Switzerland)

14 April 2026
16:00 (17:00 UTC+3)

Bulgaria	1–3	Kosovo
Yaneva 9'	Report (FIFA); Report (UEFA)	Memeti 15'; Smaili 21'; Fejza 89'

Stadion Aleksandar Shalamanov, Sofia
Attendance: 250
Referee: Zoe Stavrou (Cyprus)
14 April 2026
19:00

Gibraltar	0–1	Croatia
	Report (FIFA); Report (UEFA)	Kurkutović 38'

Europa Sports Park, Gibraltar
Attendance: 251
Referee: Ines Andrada (Portugal)

18 April 2026
16:30

Croatia	9–0	Gibraltar
Čanjevac 38', 61'; Bakalar 42'; Vračević 58'; Rudelić 65', 87'; Kukavica 81'; Vlastelica 86'; Glibo 90'	Report (FIFA); Report (UEFA)

Gradski stadion, Sinj
Attendance: 300
Referee: Zuzana Valentová (Slovakia)
18 April 2026
18:00

Kosovo	2–1	Bulgaria
Smaili 52'; Memti 90+6'	Report (FIFA); Report (UEFA)	Petrova 42'

Fadil Vokrri Stadium, Pristina
Attendance: 260
Referee: Jana Van Laere (Belgium)

5 June 2026
17:00 (18:00 UTC+3)

Bulgaria	3–1	Gibraltar
Yaneva 2'; Ferro 43' (o.g.); Petrova 70'	Report (FIFA); Report (UEFA)	Gilbert 89'

Stadion Aleksandar Shalamanov, Sofia
Attendance: 156
Referee: Irena Velevačkoska (North Macedonia)
5 June 2026
19:00

Kosovo	0–1	Croatia
	Report (FIFA); Report (UEFA)	Čanjevac 15'

Fadil Vokrri Stadium, Pristina
Attendance: 800
Referee: Karoline Wacker (Germany)

9 June 2026
19:00

Croatia	4–0	Bulgaria
Ćavar 26', 51'; Čanjevac 49'; Kurkutović 67'	Report (FIFA); Report (UEFA)

Stadion Aldo Drosina, Pula
Attendance: 200
Referee: Melissa Burgin (England)
9 June 2026
19:00

Gibraltar	0–8	Kosovo
	Report (FIFA); Report (UEFA)	Halilaj 3'; Memeti 7', 21'; Biqkaj 14'; Smaili 32', 76'; Uka 68'; Fetaj 84'

Europa Sports Park, Gibraltar
Attendance: 232
Referee: Marisca Overtoom (Netherlands)

=== Group C3 ===
Pos	Team	Pld	W	D	L	GF	GA	GD	Pts	Promotion or qualification	(Hungary)	(Azerbaijan)	(North Macedonia)	(Andorra)
1	Hungary (P)	6	5	1	0	21	2	+19	16	Advance to play-offs and promotion to League B	—	1–0	7–0	6–1
2	Azerbaijan	6	4	0	2	11	5	+6	12		1–2	—	2–0	2–0
3	North Macedonia	6	2	0	4	5	17	−12	6		0–5	1–3	—	3–0
4	Andorra	6	0	1	5	2	15	−13	1		0–0	1–3	0–1	—

Source: UEFA
Rules for classification: Tiebreakers
(P) Promoted
3 March 2026
12:00 (15:00 UTC+4)

Azerbaijan	2–0	North Macedonia
Jafarzade 28', 78'	Report (FIFA); Report (UEFA)

Dalga Arena, Baku
Attendance: 325
Referee: Anna Adamska (Poland)
3 March 2026
19:00

Andorra	0–0	Hungary
	Report (FIFA); Report (UEFA)

Estadi Nacional, Andorra la Vella
Attendance: 330
Referee: Roxana Recorean (Romania)

7 March 2026
14:30

Hungary	1–0	Azerbaijan
Pápai 45+1'	Report (FIFA); Report (UEFA)

Pancho Aréna, Felcsút
Attendance: 760
Referee: Filipa Pereira Cunha (Portugal)
7 March 2026
15:00

North Macedonia	3–0	Andorra
Galabovska 17'; Meijer 20'; Grozdanova 83'	Report (FIFA); Report (UEFA)

Petar Miloševski Stadium, Bitola
Attendance: 650
Referee: Charlotte Carpenter (Wales)

14 April 2026
16:00

North Macedonia	0–5	Hungary
	Report (FIFA); Report (UEFA)	Csányi 2', 9', 20'; Savanya 45+1'; Csiki 88'

Petar Miloševski Stadium, Bitola
Attendance: 200
Referee: Davina Lutz (Germany)
14 April 2026
19:00

Andorra	1–3	Azerbaijan
Morató 12'	Report (FIFA); Report (UEFA)	Jafarzade 15', 50' (pen.); Manya 90+5'

Estadi Nacional, Andorra la Vella
Attendance: 353
Referee: Kristina Kozoroh (Ukraine)

18 April 2026
15:00

Hungary	7–0	North Macedonia
Mayer 21', 51'; Paneva 35' (o.g.); Pápai 47'; Kaján 68'; Va. Nagy 85'; Savanya 90+3' (pen.)	Report (FIFA); Report (UEFA)

Pancho Aréna, Felcsút
Attendance: 353
Referee: Paola Cebollada López (Spain)
18 April 2026
15:00 (17:00 UTC+4)

Azerbaijan	2–0	Andorra
Açar 12'; Manya 64'	Report (FIFA); Report (UEFA)

Bank Respublika Arena, Absheron
Attendance: 130
Referee: Vesna Miletić (Bosnia and Herzegovina)

5 June 2026
16:00 (18:00 UTC+4)

Azerbaijan	1–2	Hungary
Asadova 74'	Report (FIFA); Report (UEFA)	Csányi 12'; V. Nagy 85'

Mehdi Huseynzade Sumgait City Stadium, Sumgait
Attendance: 550
Referee: Vanja Janković (Slovenia)
5 June 2026
19:30

Andorra	0–1	North Macedonia
	Report (FIFA); Report (UEFA)	Nikolovska 86'

Estadi Nacional, Andorra la Vella
Attendance: 347
Referee: Ana Afo (Portugal)

9 June 2026
19:00

Hungary	6–1	Andorra
Vik. Nagy 3'; Kaján 39'; Va. Nagy 41'; Fenyvesi 57', 69'; Pusztai 89'	Report (FIFA); Report (UEFA)	Da Cruz 55'

Illovszky Rudolf Stadion, Budapest
Attendance: 711
Referee: Melek Dakan (Turkey)
9 June 2026
19:00

North Macedonia	1–3	Azerbaijan
Mustafa 11'	Report (FIFA); Report (UEFA)	Bakarandze 8'; Mollayeva 28'; Mirzaliyeva 37'

Petar Miloševski Stadium, Bitola
Attendance: 200
Referee: Teona Sturua (Georgia)

=== Group C4 ===
Pos	Team	Pld	W	D	L	GF	GA	GD	Pts	Promotion or qualification	(Greece)	(Faroe Islands)	(Georgia (country))
1	Greece (P)	4	4	0	0	11	4	+7	12	Advance to play-offs and promotion to League B	—	2–0	3–0
2	Faroe Islands	4	2	0	2	6	7	−1	6		2–3	—	1–0
3	Georgia	4	0	0	4	4	10	−6	0		2–3	2–3	—

Source: UEFA
Rules for classification: Tiebreakers
(P) Promoted
3 March 2026
17:30 (18:30 UTC+2)

Greece	3–0	Georgia
Markou 20'; Brouksair 80'; Tzourtzevits 86'	Report (FIFA); Report (UEFA)

Theodoros Vardinogiannis Stadium, Heraklion
Attendance: 730
Referee: Lizzy van der Helm (Netherlands)

7 March 2026
19:30 (20:30 UTC+2)

Greece	2–0	Faroe Islands
Sarri 2' (pen.); Koggouli 78'	Report (FIFA); Report (UEFA)

Theodoros Vardinogiannis Stadium, Heraklion
Attendance: 927
Referee: Jeļena Jermolajeva (Latvia)

14 April 2026
18:00 (17:00 UTC+1)

Faroe Islands	2–3	Greece
Johannesen 9'; Ryan 90+6'	Report (FIFA); Report (UEFA)	Moraitou 8'; Giannaka 53'; Drakogiannaki 78'

Tórsvøllur, Tórshavn
Attendance: 735
Referee: Hanna Laajanen (Sweden)

18 April 2026
18:00 (17:00 UTC+1)

Faroe Islands	1–0	Georgia
Brændstrup 90'	Report (FIFA); Report (UEFA)

Tórsvøllur, Tórshavn
Attendance: 728
Referee: Stacey Pearson (England)

5 June 2026
15:30 (17:30 UTC+4)

Georgia	2–3	Faroe Islands
Bebia 15' (pen.); Bukhrikidze 53'	Report (FIFA); Report (UEFA)	Zakariasardóttir 45+3'; T. Joensen 87' (pen.); T. Mohr 90'

David Petriashvili Stadium, Tbilisi
Attendance: 200
Referee: Ioanna Allayiotou (Cyprus)

9 June 2026
19:00 (21:00 UTC+4)

Georgia	2–3	Greece
	Report (FIFA); Report (UEFA)

M. Meskhi II Stadium, Tbilisi
Attendance: 780

=== Group C5 ===
Pos	Team	Pld	W	D	L	GF	GA	GD	Pts	Promotion or qualification	(Romania)	(Moldova)	(Cyprus)
1	Romania (P)	4	3	1	0	8	0	+8	10	Advance to play-offs and promotion to League B	—	1–0	3–0
2	Moldova	4	1	2	1	2	1	+1	5		0–0	—	0–0
3	Cyprus	4	0	1	3	0	9	−9	1		0–4	0–2	—

Source: UEFA
Rules for classification: Tiebreakers
(P) Promoted
3 March 2026
17:00 (18:00 UTC+2)

Romania	1–0	Moldova
Bălăceanu 54'	Report (FIFA); Report (UEFA)

Stadionul Arcul de Triumf, Bucharest
Attendance: 560
Referee: Sofiya Prychyna (Ukraine)

7 March 2026
14:00 (15:00 UTC+2)

Cyprus	0–4	Romania
	Report (FIFA); Report (UEFA)	Bălăceanu 12', 74'; Ciolacu 40' (pen.); Vlădulescu 58'

Dasaki Stadium, Achna
Attendance: 350
Referee: Eszter Urbán (Hungary)

14 April 2026
16:00 (17:00 UTC+3)

Moldova	0–0	Cyprus
	Report (FIFA); Report (UEFA)

Nisporeni Central Stadium, Nisporeni
Attendance: 305
Referee: Natálie Čampišová (Czech Republic)

18 April 2026
15:00 (16:00 UTC+3)

Romania	3–0	Cyprus
Vlădulescu 5'; I. Stancu 85'; Ciolacu 90+1'	Report (FIFA); Report (UEFA)

Stadionul Arcul de Triumf, Bucharest
Attendance: 772
Referee: Nadine Reichmuth (Switzerland)

5 June 2026
17:00 (18:00 UTC+3)

Moldova	0–0	Romania
	Report (FIFA); Report (UEFA)

Nisporeni Central Stadium, Nisporeni
Attendance: 548
Referee: Sapir Gaya Berman (Israel)

9 June 2026
19:00 (20:00 UTC+3)

Cyprus	0–2	Moldova
	Report (FIFA); Report (UEFA)	Țabur 62'; Colesnicenco 86'

Antonis Papadopoulos Stadium, Larnaca
Attendance: 254
Referee: Charlotte Carpenter (Wales)

=== Group C6 ===
Pos	Team	Pld	W	D	L	GF	GA	GD	Pts	Promotion or qualification	(Belarus)	(Kazakhstan)	(Armenia)
1	Belarus (P)	4	3	0	1	10	1	+9	9	Advance to play-offs and promotion to League B	—	0–1	6–0
2	Kazakhstan	4	2	1	1	5	2	+3	7	Advance to play-offs	0–1	—	3–0
3	Armenia	4	0	1	3	1	13	−12	1		0–3	1–1	—

Source: UEFA
Rules for classification: Tiebreakers
(P) Promoted
3 March 2026
16:00 (20:00 UTC+5)

Kazakhstan	3–0	Armenia
Burova 35'; Mamyrova 76'; Nurusheva 79'	Report (FIFA); Report (UEFA)

Astana Arena, Astana
Attendance: 200
Referee: Lorraine Watson (Scotland)

7 March 2026
10:00 (14:00 UTC+5)

Kazakhstan	0–1	Belarus
	Report (FIFA); Report (UEFA)	Siniauskaya 71'

Astana Arena, Astana
Attendance: 200
Referee: Tjaša Misja (Slovenia)

14 April 2026
14:00 (16:00 UTC+4)

Armenia	0–3	Belarus
	Report (FIFA); Report (UEFA)	Karazgezian 17' (o.g.); Shlapakova 57'; Valyuk 78'

Vazgen Sargsyan Republican Stadium, Yerevan
Attendance: 291
Referee: Sara Telek (Austria)

18 April 2026
14:00 (16:00 UTC+4)

Belarus	0–1	Kazakhstan
	Report (FIFA); Report (UEFA)	Norbayeva 84'

Tengiz Burjanadze Stadium, Gori (Georgia) (Note: Due to Belarusian involvement in the Russian invasion of Ukraine, Belarus are required to play their home matches at neutral venues, and behind closed doors, until further notice.)
Attendance: 0
Referee: Andromachi Tsiofliki (Greece)

5 June 2026
16:00 (18:00 UTC+4)

Armenia	1–1	Kazakhstan
Karagezian 35'	Report (FIFA); Report (UEFA)	Bibossynova 70'

Yerevan Football Academy Stadium, Yerevan
Attendance: 200
Referee: Marta San Juan (Andorra)

9 June 2026
19:00 (21:00 UTC+4)

Belarus	6–0	Armenia
Asatryan 2' (o.g.); Kovaleva 19'; Poghosyan 23' (o.g.); Sardaryam 56' (o.g.); Tsikhvodav 81'; Pratasiuk 86'	Report (FIFA); Report (UEFA)

Tengiz Burjanadze Stadium, Gori (Georgia)
Attendance: 0
Referee: Senida Petak (Bosnia and Herzegovina)

== Ranking of runners-up ==
Pos	Grp	Team (Note: Due to differing group sizes, results against fourth-place teams are not considered when ranking runners-up.)	Pld	W	D	L	GF	GA	GD	Pts	Qualification
1	C2	Croatia	4	3	0	1	6	1	+5	9	Advance to play-offs
2	C6	Kazakhstan	4	2	1	1	5	2	+3	7	Advance to play-offs
3	C3	Azerbaijan	4	2	0	2	6	4	+2	6	
4	C4	Faroe Islands	4	2	0	2	6	7	−1	6	
5	C5	Moldova	4	1	2	1	2	1	+1	5	
6	C1	Bosnia and Herzegovina	4	1	2	1	4	4	0	5	

Source: UEFA
Rules for classification: Tiebreakers

== Overall standings ==
Pos	Grp	Team (Note: Due to differing group sizes in League C, results against fourth-place teams are not considered when ranking group winners, runners-up, and third-place teams.)	Pld	W	D	L	GF	GA	GD	Pts
33	C3	Hungary	4	4	0	0	15	1	+14	12
34	C4	Greece	4	4	0	0	11	4	+7	12
35	C5	Romania	4	3	1	0	8	0	+8	10
36	C6	Belarus	4	3	0	1	10	1	+9	9
37	C2	Kosovo	4	3	0	1	6	3	+3	9
38	C1	Lithuania	4	1	2	1	3	1	+2	5
39	C2	Croatia	4	3	0	1	6	1	+5	9
40	C6	Kazakhstan	4	2	1	1	5	2	+3	7
41	C3	Azerbaijan	4	2	0	2	6	4	+2	6
42	C4	Faroe Islands	4	2	0	2	6	7	−1	6
43	C5	Moldova	4	1	2	1	2	1	+1	5
44	C1	Bosnia and Herzegovina	4	1	2	1	4	4	0	5
45	C1	Estonia	4	1	2	1	4	5	−1	5
46	C5	Cyprus	4	0	1	3	0	9	−9	1
47	C6	Armenia	4	0	1	3	1	13	−12	1
48	C4	Georgia	4	0	0	4	4	10	−6	0
49	C2	Bulgaria	4	0	0	4	2	10	−8	0
50	C3	North Macedonia	4	0	0	4	1	17	−16	0
51	C3	Andorra	6	0	1	5	2	15	−13	1
52	C1	Liechtenstein	6	0	0	6	3	34	−31	0
53	C2	Gibraltar	6	0	0	6	1	32	−31	0

Source: UEFA
Rules for classification: Tiebreakers

== Goalscorers ==
There were 181 goals scored in 54 matches, for an average of 3.35 goals per match.

6 goals

- (Lithuania women's national football team) Rimantė Jonušaitė

5 goals

- (Bosnia and Herzegovina women's national football team) Milena Nikolić
- (Kosovo women's national football team) Erëleta Memeti

4 goals

- (Azerbaijan women's national football team) Sevinj Jafarzade
- (Croatia women's national football team) Janja Čanjevac
- (Hungary women's national football team) Diána Csányi
- (Kosovo women's national football team) Blerta Smaili

3 goals

- (Bosnia and Herzegovina women's national football team) Emina Ekić
- (Bosnia and Herzegovina women's national football team) Marija Milinković
- (Estonia women's national football team) Vlada Kubassova
- (Hungary women's national football team) Vanessza Nagy
- (Kosovo women's national football team) Gentiana Fetaj
- (Kosovo women's national football team) Modesta Uka
- (Romania women's national football team) Ioana Bălăceanu

2 goals

- (Azerbaijan women's national football team) Esra Manya
- (Bosnia and Herzegovina women's national football team) Andrea Grebenar
- (Bosnia and Herzegovina women's national football team) Melisa Hasanbegović
- (Bulgaria women's national football team) Dimitra Ivanova
- (Bulgaria women's national football team) Lora Petrova
- (Bulgaria women's national football team) Aleksandra Yaneva
- (Croatia women's national football team) Martina Ćavar
- (Croatia women's national football team) Karla Kurkutović
- (Croatia women's national football team) Ivana Rudelić
- (Estonia women's national football team) Katrin Kirpu
- (Estonia women's national football team) Lisette Tammik
- (Greece women's national football team) Kallisti Brouksair
- (Hungary women's national football team) Evelin Fenyvesi
- (Hungary women's national football team) Zsanett Kaján
- (Hungary women's national football team) Zsófia Mayer
- (Hungary women's national football team) Emőke Pápai
- (Hungary women's national football team) Csilla Savanya
- (Kosovo women's national football team) Kaltrina Biqkaj
- (Lithuania women's national football team) Ugnė Lazdauskaitė
- (Romania women's national football team) Mihaela Ciolacu
- (Romania women's national football team) Ana Maria Vlădulescu

1 goal

- (Andorra women's national football team) Maria Da Cruz
- (Andorra women's national football team) Teresa Morató
- (Armenia women's national football team) Svetlana Karagezian
- (Azerbaijan women's national football team) Yeliz Açar
- (Azerbaijan women's national football team) Khanim Asadova
- (Azerbaijan women's national football team) Kristina Bakarandze
- (Azerbaijan women's national football team) Nigar Mirzaliyeva
- (Azerbaijan women's national football team) Mana Mollayeva
- (Belarus women's national football team) Zarina Kapustina
- (Belarus women's national football team) Anastasia Kovaleva
- (Belarus women's national football team) Darya Pratasiuk
- (Belarus women's national football team) Anastasiya Shlapakova
- (Belarus women's national football team) Hanna Siniauskaya
- (Belarus women's national football team) Krystsina Tsikhvodav
- (Belarus women's national football team) Viktoryia Valyuk
- (Bosnia and Herzegovina women's national football team) Marija Aleksić
- (Bosnia and Herzegovina women's national football team) Vina Crnoja
- (Bosnia and Herzegovina women's national football team) Minela Gačanica
- (Bosnia and Herzegovina women's national football team) Aldina Hamzić
- (Bosnia and Herzegovina women's national football team) Selma Kapetanović
- (Bosnia and Herzegovina women's national football team) Una Rankić
- (Bosnia and Herzegovina women's national football team) Ena Šabanagić
- (Bulgaria women's national football team) Ivana Naydenova
- (Bulgaria women's national football team) Polina Rasina
- (Croatia women's national football team) Ana Bakalar
- (Croatia women's national football team) Andrea Glibo
- (Croatia women's national football team) Lana Kukavica
- (Croatia women's national football team) Laura Vlastelica
- (Croatia women's national football team) Tea Vračević
- (Croatia women's national football team) Lucija Vunić
- (Estonia women's national football team) Mari-Liis Lillemäe
- (Estonia women's national football team) Liisa Merisalu
- (Estonia women's national football team) Siret Räämet
- (Estonia women's national football team) Kristina Teern
- (Faroe Islands women's national football team) Anna Brændstrup
- (Faroe Islands women's national football team) Tórunn Joensen
- (Faroe Islands women's national football team) Ásla Johannesen
- (Faroe Islands women's national football team) Tóra Mohr
- (Faroe Islands women's national football team) Birita Ryan
- (Faroe Islands women's national football team) Brá Zakariasardóttir
- (Georgia women's national football team) Maiko Bebia
- (Georgia women's national football team) Nino Bukhrikidze
- (Gibraltar women's national football team) Joelle Gilbert
- (Greece women's national football team) Georgia Chalatsogianni
- (Greece women's national football team) Eleftheria Drakogiannaki
- (Greece women's national football team) Vasiliki Giannaka
- (Greece women's national football team) Sophia Koggouli
- (Greece women's national football team) Eleni Markou
- (Greece women's national football team) Athanasia Moraitou
- (Greece women's national football team) Veatriki Sarri
- (Greece women's national football team) Marina Theodoraki
- (Greece women's national football team) Ilektra Tzourtzevits
- (Hungary women's national football team) Anna Csiki
- (Hungary women's national football team) Viktória Nagy
- (Hungary women's national football team) Sára Pusztai
- (Kazakhstan women's national football team) Amina Bibossynova
- (Kazakhstan women's national football team) Alexandra Burova
- (Kazakhstan women's national football team) Anelya Mamyrova
- (Kazakhstan women's national football team) Kazyna Norbayeva
- (Kazakhstan women's national football team) Bibigul Nurusheva
- (Kosovo women's national football team) Albulena Fejza
- (Kosovo women's national football team) Donjeta Halilaj
- (Kosovo women's national football team) Sara Sahiti
- (Liechtenstein women's national football team) Lena Göppel
- (Liechtenstein women's national football team) Katharina Risch
- (Liechtenstein women's national football team) Joy Steck
- (Lithuania women's national football team) Skaistė Petrauskaitė
- (Lithuania women's national football team) Viltė Švarcaitė
- (Lithuania women's national football team) Liucija Vaitukaitytė
- (Moldova women's national football team) Nadejda Colesnicenco
- (Moldova women's national football team) Carolina Țabur
- (North Macedonia women's national football team) Teona Galabovska
- (North Macedonia women's national football team) Melanija Grozdanova
- (North Macedonia women's national football team) Simona Meijer
- (North Macedonia women's national football team) Hava Mustafa
- (North Macedonia women's national football team) Pavlinka Nikolovska
- (Romania women's national football team) Ioana Stancu

1 own goal

- (Armenia women's national football team) Veronika Asatryan (against Belarus)
- (Armenia women's national football team) Alina Poghosyan (against Belarus)
- (Armenia women's national football team) Shoghik Sardaryam (against Belarus)
- (Gibraltar women's national football team) Tiana Borrell (against Bulgaria)
- (Gibraltar women's national football team) Kayleigh Ferro (against Bulgaria)
- (Greece women's national football team) Efi Brame (against Georgia)
- (Greece women's national football team) Marina Theodoraki (against Georgia)
- (Liechtenstein women's national football team) Felicia Frick (against Bosnia and Herzegovina)
- (North Macedonia women's national football team) Mila Paneva (against Hungary)
