= Mihaela Ciolacu =

Romanian footballer (born 1998)

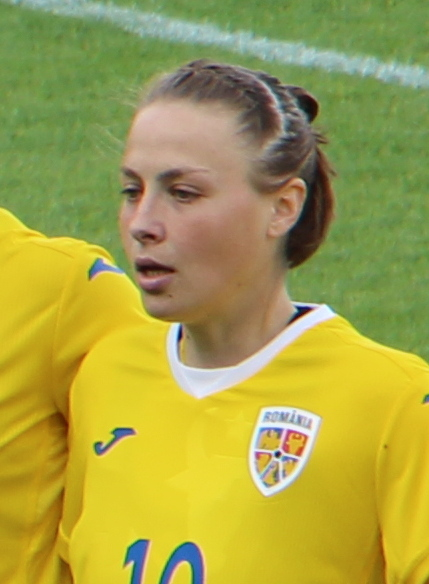

Personal information
- Date of birth: 12 August 1998 (age 28)
- Place of birth: Brașov, Romania
- Position: Midfielder

Team information
- Current team: Olimpia Cluj
- Number: 9

Senior career*
Years	Team	Apps	(Gls)
- Olimpia Cluj

International career^{‡}
- Romania
- * Club domestic league appearances and goals as of 19:48, 30 August 2019 (UTC) ‡ National team caps and goals as of 19:48, 30 August 2019 (UTC)

Mihaela Ciolacu (born 12 August 1998) is a Romanian footballer who plays as a midfielder and has appeared for the Romania women's national team.

== Career ==
Ciolacu has been capped for the Romania national team, appearing for the team during the 2019 FIFA Women's World Cup qualifying cycle.

== International goals ==
Scores and results list Romania's goal tally first.

No.	Date	Venue	Opponent	Score	Result	Competition
1.	27 February 2019	Gold City, Antalya, Turkey	Turkmenistan	5–0	13–0	2019 Turkish Women's Cup
2.	23 February 2021	Stadion Aldo Drosina, Pula, Croatia	Croatia	1–0	1–0	UEFA Women's Euro 2022 qualifying
3.	21 September 2021	Stadionul Mogoșoaia, Mogoșoaia, Romania	Lithuania	1–0	3–0	2023 FIFA Women's World Cup qualification
4.	26 November 2021	Stadionul Mogoșoaia, Mogoșoaia, Romania	Moldova	2–0	3–0	2023 FIFA Women's World Cup qualification
5.	24 June 2022	Zimbru Stadium, Chișinău, Moldova	Moldova	1–0	4–0	2023 FIFA Women's World Cup qualification
6.	2 September 2022	LFF Stadium, Vilnius, Lithuania	Lithuania	1–0	1–7	2023 FIFA Women's World Cup qualification
7.	5 April 2024	Armavir City Stadium, Armavir, Armenia	Armenia	4–0	5–0	UEFA Women's Euro 2025 qualifying
8.	16 July 2024	Stadionul Arcul de Triumf, Bucharest, Romania	Armenia	1–0	3–1	UEFA Women's Euro 2025 qualifying
9.	4 April 2025	Stadionul Arcul de Triumf, Bucharest, Romania	Northern Ireland	1–1	1–1	2025 UEFA Women's Nations League
10.	2 December 2025	Anghel Iordănescu Stadium, Voluntari, Romania	Moldova	2–0	2–0	Friendly
11.	7 March 2026	Dasaki Stadium, Achna, Cyprus	Cyprus	2–0	4–0	2027 FIFA Women's World Cup qualification
12.	18 April 2026	Stadionul Arcul de Triumf, Bucharest, Romania	Cyprus	3–0	3–0	2027 FIFA Women's World Cup qualification
