= Marija Milinković =

Bosnian footballer (born 2004)

Personal information
- Full name: Marija Ana Milinković
- Date of birth: 16 November 2004 (age 21)
- Place of birth: Kasindo
- Height: 1.81 m (5 ft 11 in)
- Position: Centre-back

Team information
- Current team: Inter Milan
- Number: 24

Senior career*
Years	Team	Apps	(Gls)
–2024	SFK 2000		
2024–	Inter Milan	58	(6)

International career^{‡}
2019	Bosnia and Herzegovina U17	3	(1)
2021–	Bosnia and Herzegovina U19	7	(2)
2020–	Bosnia and Herzegovina	20	(1)
- * Club domestic league appearances and goals as of 17 May 2026 ‡ National team caps and goals as of 5 February 2024

Marija Ana Milinković (born 16 November 2004) is a Bosnian footballer who plays as a Centre-back for Serie A club Inter Milan and the Bosnia and Herzegovina women's national team. She was twice in a row voted Best Bosnia and Herzegovina Women's Premier League Player of the Year.

== Club career ==
=== Inter Milan ===
On 5 February 2024, Milinković joined Serie A club Inter Milan.

== International goals ==
No.	Date	Venue	Opponent	Score	Result	Competition
1.	17 February 2023	Alanya, Turkey	Serbia	2–1	2–3	Friendly
2.	9 April 2024	Bosnia and Herzegovina FA Training Centre, Zenica, Bosnia & Herzegovina	Northern Ireland	1–1	1–3	UEFA Women's Euro 2025 qualifying
3.	21 February 2025	Bosnia and Herzegovina FA Training Centre, Zenica, Bosnia & Herzegovina	Romania	2–0	4–0	2025 UEFA Women's Nations League
4.	25 February 2025	Inver Park, Larne, Northern Ireland	Northern Ireland	2–1	2–3	2025 UEFA Women's Nations League
5.	3 March 2026	Bosnia and Herzegovina FA Training Centre, Zenica, Bosnia & Herzegovina	Estonia	1–0	3–1	2027 FIFA Women's World Cup qualification
6.	7 March 2026	Bosnia and Herzegovina FA Training Centre, Zenica, Bosnia & Herzegovina	Liechtenstein	1–0	13–1	2027 FIFA Women's World Cup qualification
7.	18 April 2026	Rheinpark Stadion, Vaduz, Liechtenstein	Liechtenstein	3–0	6–0	2027 FIFA Women's World Cup qualification

== Honours ==
Individual

- Serie A Team of the Season (Under-23): 2025–26
