= Ioana Bălăceanu =

Romanian footballer (born 2003)

Personal information
- Full name: Ioana Maria Nicoleta Bălăceanu
- Date of birth: 11 July 2003 (age 23)
- Position: Forward

Team information
- Current team: Olimpia Cluj

International career^{‡}
Years	Team	Apps	(Gls)
2018–2020	Romania U17	14	(2)
2020–	Romania	3	(1)
- ‡ National team caps and goals as of 19:31, 31 January 2021 (UTC)

Ioana Bălăceanu (born 11 July 2003) is a Romanian footballer who plays as a forward for Olimpia Cluj and the Romania women's national team.

== Career ==
She made her debut for the Romania national team on 4 April 2019 against Malta, starting the match.

== International goals ==
No.	Date	Venue	Opponent	Score	Result	Competition
1.	27 February 2019	Gold City, Antalya, Turkey	Turkmenistan	2–0	13–0	2019 Turkish Women's Cup
2.	27 February 2019	Gold City, Antalya, Turkey	Turkmenistan	9–0	13–0	2019 Turkish Women's Cup
3.	26 November 2021	Stadionul Mogoșoaia, Mogoșoaia, Romania	Moldova	1–0	3–0	2023 FIFA Women's World Cup qualification
4.	15 November 2022	Stadionul Arcul de Triumf, Bucharest, Romania	Czech Republic	1–1	1–2	Friendly
5.	25 October 2024	Stadionul Arcul de Triumf, Bucharest, Romania	Poland	1–0	1–2	UEFA Women's Euro 2025 qualifying play-offs
6.	2 December 2025	Anghel Iordănescu Stadium, Voluntari, Romania	Moldova	1–0	2–0	Friendly
7.	3 March 2026	Stadionul Arcul de Triumf, Bucharest, Romania	Moldova	1–0	1–0	2027 FIFA Women's World Cup qualification
8.	7 March 2026	Dasaki Stadium, Achna, Cyprus	Cyprus	1–0	4–0	2027 FIFA Women's World Cup qualification
9.	7 March 2026	Dasaki Stadium, Achna, Cyprus	Cyprus	4–0	4–0	2027 FIFA Women's World Cup qualification
