= Siret Räämet =

Estonian footballer

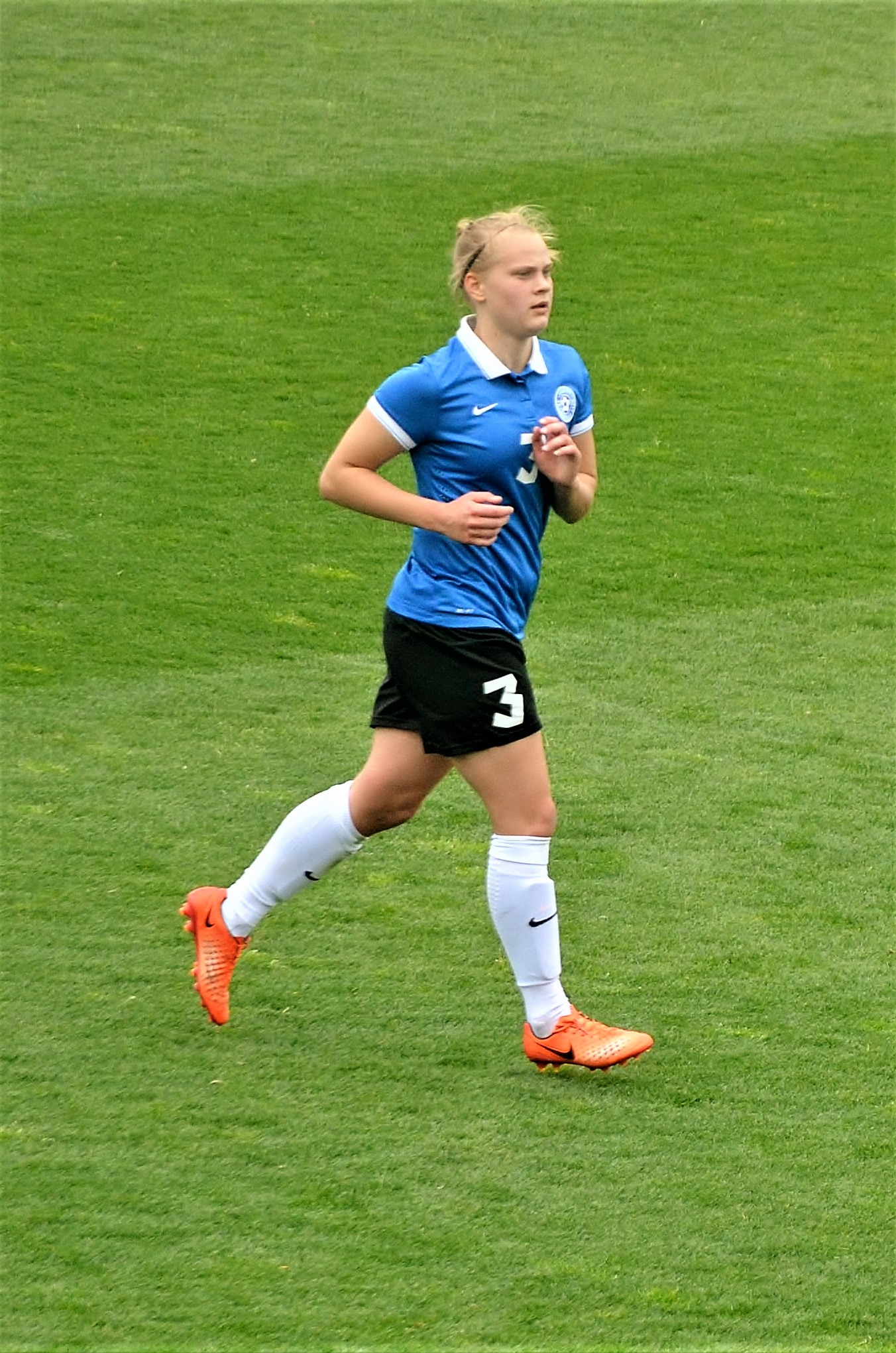
- Räämet in 2018

Personal information
- Date of birth: 31 December 1999 (age 26)
- Place of birth: Tallinn, Estonia
- Height: 1.64 m (5 ft 5 in)
- Position: Defender

Team information
- Current team: LASK
- Number: 36

Senior career*
Years	Team	Apps	(Gls)
2015-2024	Flora		
2025-	LASK	28	(4)

International career^{‡}
2017–	Estonia	63	(1)
- * Club domestic league appearances and goals as of 14 April 2026 ‡ National team caps and goals as of 15 April 2026

Siret Räämet (born 31 December 1999) is an Estonian footballer who plays as a defender for LASK in the ÖFB Frauen Bundesliga and has appeared for the Estonia women's national team.

== Career ==
Räämet has been capped for the Estonia national team, appearing for the team during the UEFA Women's Euro 2021 qualifying cycle.

== International goals ==
No.	Date	Venue	Opponent	Score	Result	Competition
1.	3 March 2026	FF BH Football Training Centre, Zenica, Bosnia and Herzegovina	Bosnia and Herzegovina	1–1	1-3	2027 FIFA Women's World Cup qualification
