= Una Rankić =

Bosnia and Herzegovina footballer (born 2007)

Una Rankić (born 26 November 2007) is a Bosnia and Herzegovina footballer who plays as an attacking midfielder.

== Early life ==
When Rankić was a child, her mother died.

== Club career ==
Rankić has been described as "an incredible talent, and this is best shown by the statistics that she scored as many as 31 goals in 11 rounds played in the Cadet Premier League and is the top scorer herself". She has also been described as "one of the most talented soccer players in Europe".

== International career ==
In 2023, Rankić debuted for Bosnia and Herzegovina during a 2–1 win over Belarus, thus breaking the record as the youngest senior team debutant in history.. On 7 March 2026, she scored her first international goal for national team in a 13–1 victory against Liechtenstein.

=== International goals ===
No.	Date	Venue	Opponent	Score	Result	Competition
1.	7 March 2026	Bosnia and Herzegovina FA Training Centre, Zenica, Bosnia and Herzegovina	Liechtenstein	12–1	13–1	2027 FIFA Women's World Cup qualification

== Personal life ==
Rankić is the daughter of former footballer Vladimir Rankić.
