= Croatia women's national football team =

Women's national association football team representing Croatia

Croatia
- Association: Croatian Football Federation
- Confederation: UEFA (Europe)
- Head coach: Nenad Gračan
- Captain: Doris Bačić
- Most caps: Kristina Nevrkla (110)
- Top scorer: Ivana Rudelić (24)
- FIFA code: CRO
First colours	Second colours

FIFA ranking
- Current: 63 (20 October 2026)
- Highest: 44 (July 2003 – June 2005)
- Lowest: 66 (April 2026)

First international
- Slovenia 3–2 Croatia (Ižakovci, Slovenia; 28 October 1993)

Biggest win
- Croatia 9–0 Gibraltar (Sinj, Croatia; 18 April 2026)

Biggest defeat
- Romania 10–0 Croatia (Bucharest, Romania; 2 October 2004)
- Website: hns-cff.hr

The Croatia women's national football team represents Croatia in international women's football matches. It is governed by the Croatian Football Federation, the governing body for football in Croatia. It is a member of UEFA in Europe and FIFA in global competitions. The team's colours reference two national symbols: the Croatian checkerboard and the country's tricolour. They are colloquially referred to as the Lavice ('Lionesses').

== History ==
After winning independence from Yugoslavia in 1991, the newly established Croatian Football Federation moved toward creating separate national football teams to represent the country, which included the establishment of the women's team. Three years after the men's team debut, the women's team of Croatia officially marked their international debut, playing against neighbouring Slovenia in a friendly on 28 October 1993, where Croatia lost 2–3 away.

Since the 2000s, the women's national football team has pursued qualifying campaigns for the UEFA Women's Championship and FIFA Women's World Cup. In 2026, they began their UEFA qualifiers campaign for the 2027 FIFA Women's World Cup, finishing second in their group and advancing to the play-off phase in late-2026.

== Results and fixtures ==
The following is a list of match results in the last 12 months, as well as any future matches that have been scheduled.

Legend

Win Draw Loss Fixture

=== 2025 ===
28 November 2025 Friendly	Malta	3–2	Croatia	Ta' Qali, Malta
	Cuschieri 15'; Saliba 82'; Fareugia 84'		Kurkutovic 50'; Rudelic 51'	Stadium: Centenary Stadium

1 December Friendly	Malta	0–3	Croatia	Ta' Qali, Malta
			Maja Joščak 42'; Ivana Rudelić 48'; Karla Kurkutović 76'	Stadium: Centenary Stadium

=== 2026 ===
3 March 2026 2027 FIFA Women's World Cup qualification	Bulgaria	0–1	Croatia	Sofia, Bulgaria
11:00 (12:00 UTC+2)		Report (FIFA); Report (UEFA)	Vunić 80'	Stadium: Stadion Aleksandar Shalamanov; Attendance: 310; Referee: Araksya Saribekyan (Armenia)

7 March 2026 2027 FIFA Women's World Cup qualification	Croatia	0–1	Kosovo	Karlovac
17:00			Uka 13'	Stadium: Stadion Branko Čavlović-Čavlek; Attendance: 200; Referee: Lovisa Johansson (Sweden)

14 April 2026 2027 FIFA Women's World Cup qualification	Gibraltar	0–1	Croatia	Gibraltar
19:00		Report (FIFA); Report (UEFA)	Kurkutović 38'	Stadium: Europa Sports Park; Attendance: 251; Referee: Ines Andrada (Portugal)

18 April 2026 2027 FIFA Women's World Cup qualification	Croatia	9–0	Gibraltar	Sinj
16:30	Čanjevac 38', 61'; Bakalar 42'; Vračević 58'; Rudelić 65', 87'; Kukavica 81'; Vlastelica 86'; Glibo 90'	Report (FIFA); Report (UEFA)		Stadium: Gradski stadion Referee: Zuzana Valentová (Slovakia)

5 June 2026 2027 FIFA Women's World Cup qualification	Kosovo	0–1	Croatia	Pristina
19:00		Report (FIFA); Report (UEFA)	Čanjevac 15'	Stadium: Fadil Vokrri Stadium; Attendance: 800; Referee: Karoline Wacker (Germany)

9 June 2026 2027 FIFA Women's World Cup qualification	Croatia	4–0	Bulgaria	Pula
19:00	Ćavar 26', 51'; Čanjevac 49'; Kurkutović 67'	Report (FIFA); Report (UEFA)		Stadium: Stadion Aldo Drosina; Referee: Melissa Burgin (England)

9 October 2027 FIFA Women's World Cup play-offs	Croatia	0–4	Iceland	Pula, Croatia
18:45 UTC+2		Report	A. Eiríksdóttir 14', 90+5'; Viggósdóttir 67' (pen.); H. Eiríksdóttir 75'	Stadium: Stadion Aldo Drosina; Referee: Frida Klarlund (Denmark)

13 October 2027 FIFA Women's World Cup play-offs	Iceland	5-0	Croatia	Reykjavík, Iceland
17:30	Eiríksdóttir 35' Hermannsdóttir 40' Tryggvadóttir 56' Zomers 90', 90+3'	Report (FIFA); Report (UEFA)		Stadium: Laugardalsvöllur

== Coaching staff ==
Position	Staff
Head Coach	(Croatia) Nenad Gračan
Assistant Coach	(Croatia) Jure Perković
Assistant Coach	(Croatia) Nenad Glušica
Assistant Coach	(Croatia) Helena Hercigonja-Moulton
Goalkeeping Coach	(Croatia) Blaž Bugarin

== Players ==
=== Current squad ===
The following players were called up for the 2027 FIFA Women's World Cup qualification matches against Kosovo and Bulgaria on 5 and 9 June 2026, respectively.

Caps and goals correct as of 9 June 2026, after the match against Bulgaria.

No.	Pos.	Player	Date of birth (age)	Caps	Goals	Club
1	GK	Doris Bačić (captain)	23 February 1995 (age 31)	100	0	(Italian Football Federation) Napoli
12	GK	Carlotta Sesjak	24 April 2006 (age 20)	0	0	(German Football Association) de:1. FFC Recklinghausen
23	GK	Nika Radolović	22 April 2008 (age 18)	2	0	(Croatian Football Federation) Istra 1961
2	DF	Lucia Orkić	22 June 2005 (age 21)	13	0	(Austrian Football Association) RB Salzburg
3	DF	Ana Jelenčić	8 June 1994 (age 32)	70	1	(Swiss Football Association) Servette
5	DF	Katarina Vrselja	7 October 2002 (age 24)	13	0	(Austrian Football Association) LASK
6	DF	Tea Vračević	25 April 2006 (age 20)	22	2	(Austrian Football Association) St. Pölten
19	DF	Janja Čanjevac	14 November 2000 (age 26)	31	4	(Croatian Football Federation) Hajduk Split
21	DF	Valentina Akrap	9 December 2008 (age 17)	0	0	(Austrian Football Association) RB Salzburg
4	MF	Lucija Vunić	18 February 2006 (age 20)	8	1	(Croatian Football Federation) Dinamo Zagreb
7	MF	Petra Pezelj	28 October 1998 (age 28)	59	2	(Football Association of Bosnia and Herzegovina) SFK 2000
8	MF	Ella Ljuština	10 May 2002 (age 24)	21	1	(Swiss Football Association) Grasshoppers
10	MF	Bianca Galić	14 May 1999 (age 27)	10	0	(Football Australia) Sydney FC
13	MF	Helena Spajić	8 February 2000 (age 26)	38	0	(Croatian Football Federation) Dinamo Zagreb
14	MF	Ana Bakalar	27 November 2000 (age 25)	6	1	(Croatian Football Federation) Hajduk Split
15	MF	Lana Kukavica	11 September 2006 (age 20)	2	1	(Croatian Football Federation) Hajduk Split
20	MF	Barbara Živković	15 February 2005 (age 21)	13	1	(Croatian Football Federation) Hajduk Split
9	FW	Ivana Rudelić	25 January 1992 (age 34)	68	24	(Swiss Football Association) Basel
11	FW	Karla Kurkutović	27 December 2001 (age 24)	10	7	(Polish Football Association) Górnik Łęczna
16	FW	Antonela Grgic	13 March 2008 (age 18)	1	0	(Austrian Football Association) Union Kleinmünchen
17	FW	Petra Mikulica	2 February 2005 (age 21)	24	0	(Austrian Football Association) Altach
18	FW	Martina Ćavar	11 May 2003 (age 23)	2	2	(Swiss Football Association) Zürich
22	FW	Erika Zschuppe	10 September 2003 (age 23)	1	0	(United States Soccer Federation) Tampa Bay Sun

=== Recent call-ups ===
The following players have also been called up to the squad within the past 12 months.

Pos.	Player	Date of birth (age)	Caps	Goals	Club	Latest call-up
GK	Ana Ristovski	20 January 2008 (age 18)	3	0	(Croatia) Hajduk Split	v. Gibraltar, 18 Apr 2026
GK	Ana Filipović	4 July 2003 (age 23)	1	0	(Croatia) Dinamo Zagreb	v. Montenegro, 27 October 2025
DF	Kristina Nevrkla	5 July 1990 (age 36)	110	5	(Croatia) Osijek	v. Gibraltar, 18 Apr 2026
DF	Antonia Dulčić	4 February 1997 (age 29)	43	0	(Croatia) Hajduk Split	v. Gibraltar, 18 Apr 2026
DF	Nina Varga	20 August 2005 (age 21)	2	0	(Croatia) Međimurje	v. Gibraltar, 18 Apr 2026
DF	Sara Herceg	13 September 2005 (age 21)	0	0	(Croatia) Hajduk Split	v. Gibraltar, 18 Apr 2026
DF	Maria Kunštek	6 November 1998 (age 28)	33	0	(Sweden) Växjö DFF	v. Kosovo, 7 March 2026
MF	Izabela Lojna	11 May 1992 (age 34)	103	14	(Croatia) Osijek	v. Gibraltar, 18 Apr 2026
MF	Laura Vlastelica	2 December 2005 (age 20)	2	1	(Croatia) Hajduk Split	v. Gibraltar, 18 Apr 2026
MF	Lucija Vrdoljak	22 August 2003 (age 23)	1	0	(Croatia) Osijek	v. Gibraltar, 18 Apr 2026
MF	Maja Joščak	4 August 1990 (age 36)	90	21	(Croatia) Agram	v. Kosovo, 7 March 2026
MF	Ivana Slipčević	23 August 1998 (age 28)	29	2	(Germany) SC Sand	v. Kosovo, 7 March 2026
MF	Siena Stambolich	13 August 2002 (age 24)	1	0	(Croatia) Dinamo Zagreb	v. Malta, 1 December 2025
MF	Ružica Krajinović	8 January 2002 (age 24)	17	1	(Austria) Sturm Graz	v. Montenegro, 27 October 2025
MF	Ana Jakobašić	4 March 2004 (age 22)	4	0	(Croatia) Hajduk Split	v. Montenegro, 27 October 2025
FW	Andrea Glibo	5 April 2002 (age 24)	19	1	(Austria) SKN St. Pölten	v. Gibraltar, 18 Apr 2026
FW	Paula Vidović	16 June 2003 (age 23)	10	0	(Germany) FC Ingolstadt	v. Kosovo, 7 March 2026
FW	Karla Jedvaj	16 November 2000 (age 26)	18	0	(Austria) Blau-Weiß Linz	v. Montenegro, 27 October 2025
FW	Antea Guvo	10 November 2004 (age 22)	6	0	(Republic of Ireland) Peamount United	v. Montenegro, 27 October 2025
Notes: ^{INJ} = Withdrew due to injury; ^{MED} = Withdrew due to medical reasons; ^{PRE} = Preliminary squad; ^{RET} = Retired from national team

== Records ==
As of 9 June 2026

Players in bold are still active with the national team.

=== Most appearances ===
Rank	Player	Career	Caps	Goals
1	**Kristina Nevrkla**	2008–present	110	5
2	**Izabela Lojna**	2010–present	103	14
3	Iva Landeka	2006–2022	102	14
4	**Doris Bačić**	2011–present	100	0
5	Sandra Žigić	2005–2019	94	10
6	**Maja Joščak**	2006–present	90	21
7	**Leonarda Balog**	2009–present	78	1
8	**Ana Jelenčić**	2011–present	70	1
9	**Ivana Rudelić**	2015–present	68	24
10	Kristina Šundov	2003–2020	59	8

=== Top goalscorers ===
Rank	Player	Career	Goals	Caps	Avg.
1	**Ivana Rudelić**	2015–present	24	68	0.35
2	**Maja Joščak**	2006–present	21	90	0.23
3	Katarina Kolar	2006–2014	16	40	0.40
4	Iva Landeka	2006–2022	14	102	0.14
4	**Izabela Lojna**	2010–present	14	103	0.14
6	Marina Koljenik	1994–2007	13	35	0.37
7	Ljiljana Jakšić	1995–2005	12	22	0.55
8	Sandra Žigić	2005–2019	10	94	0.11
9	Violeta Baban	2003–2020	8	58	0.14
9	Kristina Šundov	2002–2016	8	59	0.14

== Competitive record ==
Champions
Runners-up
Third place
Fourth place
Tournament played fully or partially on home soil

=== FIFA Women's World Cup ===
FIFA Women's World Cup record										Qualification record						
Year	Round	Position	Pld	W	D	L	GF	GA	Squad	Pos	Pld	W	D	L	GF	GA
(China) 1991	Part of Yugoslavia															
(Sweden) 1995	Did not enter															
(United States) 1999	Did not enter															
(United States) 2003	Did not qualify									2/5	8	4	1	3	16	11
(China) 2007	Did not qualify									2/4	6	3	0	3	11	11
(Germany) 2011	Did not qualify									6/6	10	0	2	8	4	27
(Canada) 2015	Did not qualify									4/6	10	2	2	6	7	20
(France) 2019	Did not qualify									5/5	8	0	3	5	5	20
(Australia) (New Zealand) 2023	Did not qualify									4/6	10	3	1	6	6	18
(Brazil) 2027	To be determined									To be determined						
(Costa Rica) (Jamaica) (Mexico) (United States) 2031	To be determined									To be determined						
(United Kingdom) 2035	To be determined									To be determined						
Total		0/9							—	0/6	52	12	9	31	49	107

Draws include knockout matches decided via penalty shoot-out; correct as of 6 September 2022 after the match against Lithuania.

Matches
First match	–
Biggest win	–
Biggest defeat	–

=== UEFA Women's Championship ===
UEFA Women's Championship record										Qualification record								
Year	Round	Position	Pld	W	D	L	GF	GA	Squad	Pos	Pld	W	D	L	GF	GA	P/R	Rnk
(Italy) 1969	Part of Yugoslavia																	
(Italy) 1979	Part of Yugoslavia																	
(Denmark) (England) (Italy) (Sweden) 1984	Part of Yugoslavia																	
(Norway) 1987	Part of Yugoslavia																	
(West Germany) 1989	Part of Yugoslavia																	
(Denmark) 1991	Part of Yugoslavia																	
(Italy) 1993	Did not enter																	
(England) (Germany) (Norway) (Sweden) 1995	Did not qualify									2/4	6	3	1	2	8	18	–	
(Norway) (Sweden) 1997	Did not qualify									4/4	8	0	1	7	2	23	–	
(Germany) 2001	Did not qualify									4/4	6	1	0	5	7	19	–	
(England) 2005	Did not qualify									3/5	8	4	1	3	17	22	–	
(Finland) 2009	Did not qualify									3/4	3	2	0	1	9	6	–	
(Sweden) 2013	Did not qualify									5/5	8	0	1	7	6	26	–	
(Netherlands) 2017	Did not qualify									4/5	8	2	1	5	8	15	–	
(England) 2022	Did not qualify									4/5	8	2	1	5	7	19	–	
(Switzerland) 2025	Did not qualify									3/4	8	3	1	4	5	11	(Note: From Euro 2025 onwards a new qualifying format was introduced, linked to the Women's Nations League where teams are divided into leagues with promotion/relegation between the leagues at the end of each cycle.)	25th
(Germany) 2029	To be determined									To be determined								
Total		0/10							—	0/9	55	14	6	35	64	148	25th	

Draws include knockout matches decided via penalty shoot-out
Correct as of 29 October 2024 after the match against Northern Ireland.

Matches
First match	–
Biggest win	–
Biggest defeat	–

=== UEFA Women's Nations League ===
UEFA Women's Nations League												Finals record								
Year	Lg	Gp	Pos	Pld	W	D	L	GF	GA	P/R	Rnk	Year	Round	Pld	W	D	L	GF	GA	Squad
2023–24	B	2	2nd	8	3	0	5	5	18	*	23rd	2024	Did not qualify							
2025	B	4	4th	6	1	0	5	4	17	▼	31st	2025	Did not qualify							
Total				14	4	0	10	9	35	23rd and 31st		Total	0/2	0	0	0	0	0	0	—

▲	Promoted at end of season
Same position	No movement at end of season
▼	Relegated at end of season
*	Participated in promotion/relegation play-offs

Draws include knockout matches decided on penalty kicks; correct as of 5 December 2023 after the match against Romania.

Matches
First match	Croatia 2–1 Romania (Varaždin, Croatia; 22 September 2023)
Biggest win	Croatia 2–0 Slovakia (Velika Gorica, Croatia; 1 December 2023); Croatia 2–0 Ukraine (Karlovac, Croatia; 3 June 2025)
Biggest defeat	Slovakia 4–0 Croatia (Senec, Slovakia; 26 September 2023)

== Head-to-head record ==
Key

More wins than losses
As many wins as losses
Fewer wins than losses

Correct as of 9 June 2026, after the match against Bulgaria.

Opponent	Pld	W	D	L	GF	GA	GD	Win %
Albania	4	2	0	2	11	8	+3	50.00
Armenia	1	1	0	0	4	0	+4	100.00
Azerbaijan	2	1	1	0	2	1	+1	50.00
Belgium	2	0	0	2	2	10	−8	0.00
Bosnia and Herzegovina	12	6	5	1	22	9	+13	50.00
Bulgaria	4	4	0	0	14	1	+13	100.00
Cameroon	1	0	0	1	1	2	−1	0.00
China	2	0	0	2	1	4	−3	0.00
Czech Republic	5	0	1	4	2	17	−15	0.00
Denmark	2	0	1	1	1	5	−4	0.00
England	5	0	1	4	0	16	−16	0.00
Estonia	6	3	2	1	11	6	+5	50.00
Faroe Islands	1	0	0	1	1	3	−2	0.00
Finland	4	1	0	3	4	11	−7	25.00
France	3	0	0	3	0	17	−17	0.00
Georgia	1	1	0	0	6	0	+6	100.00
Germany	6	0	0	6	0	30	−30	0.00
Gibraltar	2	2	0	0	10	0	+10	100.00
Greece	3	0	1	2	2	5	−3	0.00
Hungary	9	3	3	3	10	10	+0	33.33
Iceland	3	0	0	3	0	9	−9	0.00
Israel	2	1	0	1	5	2	+3	50.00
Italy	4	0	1	3	0	15	−15	0.00
Jordan	1	1	0	0	3	0	+3	100.00
Kosovo	4	3	0	1	4	1	+3	75.00
Latvia	1	1	0	0	3	0	+3	100.00
Lithuania	5	4	1	0	10	1	+9	80.00
Malta	7	6	0	1	20	5	+15	85.71
Mexico	1	0	1	0	1	1	+0	0.00
Moldova	2	2	0	0	5	0	+5	100.00
Montenegro	4	2	1	1	8	5	+3	50.00
Netherlands	2	0	0	2	0	5	−5	0.00
North Macedonia	3	3	0	0	10	1	+9	100.00
Northern Ireland	9	1	1	7	6	17	−11	11.11
Norway	2	0	0	2	0	8	−8	0.00
Poland	4	0	1	3	0	8	−8	0.00
Portugal	2	0	0	2	0	3	−3	0.00
Republic of Ireland	6	0	2	4	3	15	−12	0.00
Romania	12	4	2	6	13	26	−13	33.33
Russia	5	0	0	5	1	15	−14	0.00
Scotland	2	1	0	1	5	7	−2	50.00
Serbia	5	0	2	3	6	12	−6	0.00
Slovakia	9	1	1	7	7	20	−13	11.11
Slovenia	20	7	7	6	36	28	+8	35.00
Sweden	2	0	0	2	0	6	−6	0.00
Switzerland	8	2	1	5	6	16	−10	25.00
Turkey	5	3	1	1	13	8	+5	60.00
Ukraine	7	2	1	4	5	12	−7	28.57
Wales	5	2	1	2	6	9	−3	40.00
49 teams played	217	70	39	108	280	410	−130	32.26

== See also ==
- Croatia women's national under-19 football team
- Croatia women's national under-17 football team
- Croatia women's national under-15 football team
- Croatia national football team
- Croatia national football B team
- Croatia national under-23 football team
- Croatia national under-21 football team
- Croatia national under-20 football team
- Croatia national under-19 football team
- Croatia national under-18 football team
- Croatia national under-17 football team
- Croatia national under-16 football team
- Croatia national under-15 football team
