= Ana Maria Vlădulescu =

Romanian footballer (born 2001)

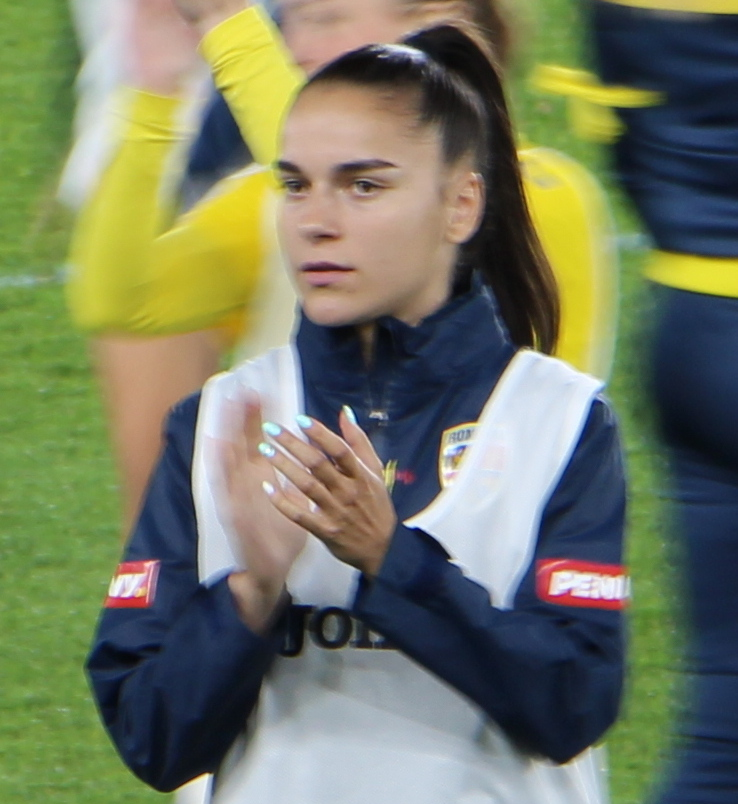

Personal information
- Date of birth: 4 March 2001 (age 25)
- Position: Midfielder

Senior career*
Years	Team	Apps	(Gls)
2020–2021	Vasas Odorhei	?	(?)
2021–	Haladás Viktória FC	?	(?)

International career^{‡}
2016–2018	Romania U17	9	(0)
2018	Romania U19	3	(0)
2019–	Romania	3	(0)
- * Club domestic league appearances and goals as of 3 september 2022 ‡ National team caps and goals as of 12 November 2019

Ana Maria Vlădulescu (born 4 March 2001) is a Romanian footballer who plays as a midfielder for the Romania women's national team.

== International goals ==
No.	Date	Venue	Opponent	Score	Result	Competition
1.	23 October 2020	Sūduva Stadium, Marijampolė, Lithuania	Lithuania	4–0	4–0	UEFA Women's Euro 2022 qualifying
2.	20 February 2022	Marbella Football Center, Marbella, Spain	Austria	1–5	1–6	Friendly
3.	24 June 2022	Zimbru Stadium, Chișinău, Moldova	Moldova	4–0	4–0	2023 FIFA Women's World Cup qualification
4.	7 March 2026	Dasaki Stadium, Achna, Cyprus	Cyprus	2–0	4–0	2027 FIFA Women's World Cup qualification
5.	18 April 2026	Stadionul Arcul de Triumf, Bucharest, Romania	Cyprus	3–0	3–0	2027 FIFA Women's World Cup qualification
