= Bosnia and Herzegovina women's national football team =

Women's national association football team representing Bosnia and Herzegovina

Bosnia and Herzegovina
- Association: Football Association of Bosnia and Herzegovina
- Confederation: UEFA (Europe)
- Head coach: Selver Hodžić
- Captain: Milena Nikolić
- Most caps: Sabina Pehić (101)
- Top scorer: Sabina Pehić (26)
- Home stadium: BiH FA Training Centre
- FIFA code: BIH
First colours	Second colours

FIFA ranking
- Current: 70 ▼3 (16 June 2026)
- Highest: 57 (March 2018; December 2020)
- Lowest: 98 (December 2007)

First international
- Slovakia 11–0 Bosnia and Herzegovina (Šaľa, Slovakia; 2 September 1997)

Biggest win
- Bosnia and Herzegovina 13–1 Liechtenstein (Zenica, Bosnia and Herzegovina; 7 March 2026)

Biggest defeat
- Hungary 13–0 Bosnia and Herzegovina (Bük, Hungary; 4 September 1999)

The Bosnia and Herzegovina women's national football team represents Bosnia and Herzegovina in international football and is controlled by the Football Association of Bosnia and Herzegovina.

They have never qualified for the World Cup or the European Championship. The team is currently coached by Selver Hodžić and captained by veteran Milena Nikolić. Currently ranked 62nd by FIFA, the team plays their home games at the Bosnia and Herzegovina FA Training Centre in the city of Zenica, the country's fourth biggest city.

== History ==
Bosnia and Herzegovina's national team played their first official match in 1997 during the 1999 World Cup qualifiers. Their best moments include winning a mini-tournament in Sarajevo in 2007.

== Team image ==
=== Home stadium ===
The Bosnia and Herzegovina women's national football team plays their home matches at the Bosnia and Herzegovina FA Training Centre.

== Results and fixtures ==
The following is a list of match results in the last 12 months, as well as any future matches that have been scheduled.

Legend

Win Draw Lose Fixture

=== 2025 ===
26 November Friendly	Bosnia and Herzegovina	1-2	Belarus	Zenica, Bosnia and Herzegovina
18:00	Nikolic 82'		Valyuk 17'; Shlapakova 58'	Stadium: FF BiH Training Center

2 December Friendly	Bosnia and Herzegovina	1-1	Greece	Zenica, Bosnia and Herzegovina
13:30	Grebenar 59'		Koggouli 44'	Stadium: FF BiH Training Center

=== 2026 ===
3 March 2027 FIFA Women's World Cup qualification	Bosnia and Herzegovina	3–1	Estonia	Zenica, Bosnia and Herzegovina
13:00	Milinković 36'; Šabanagić 45+3'; Grebenar 88'	Report (FIFA); Report (UEFA)	Räämet 41' (pen.)	Stadium: Bosnia and Herzegovina FA Training Centre; Attendance: 100; Referee: Karoline Marie Jensen (Norway)

7 March 2027 FIFA Women's World Cup qualification	Bosnia and Herzegovina	13–1	Liechtenstein	Zenica, Bosnia and Herzegovina
13:00	Milinković 6'; Frick 9' (o.g.); Hamzić 15'; Nikolić 17', 31'; M. Hasanbegović 24'; Ekić 33', 35'; Aleksić 45' (pen.); Grebenar 45+3'; Gačanica 58'; Rankić 66' (pen.); Crnoja 83' (pen.)	Report (FIFA); Report (UEFA)	Göppel 13'	Stadium: Bosnia and Herzegovina FA Training Centre; Attendance: 100; Referee: Asen Albayrak (Türkiye)

14 April 2027 FIFA Women's World Cup qualification	Lithuania	2–0	Bosnia and Herzegovina	Druskininkai, Lithuania
	62', 73' Rimantė Jonušaitė	Report		Stadium: LSC sporto kompleksas „Druskininkai“ Referee: Audrey Gerbel

18 April 2027 FIFA Women's World Cup qualification	Liechtenstein	0–6	Bosnia and Herzegovina	Vaduz, Liechtenstein
16:00		Report (FIFA); Report (UEFA)	Nikolić 5', 24', 35'; Kapetanović 6'; Milinković 9'; Ekić 64'	Stadium: Rheinpark Stadion; Attendance: 764; Referee: Frederikke Lydia Søkjær (Denmark)

5 June 2027 FIFA Women's World Cup qualification	Bosnia and Herzegovina	0–0	Lithuania	Zenica, Bosnia and Herzegovina
		Report		Stadium: FF BH Football Training Centre; Referee: Minka Vekkeli (Finland)

9 June 2027 FIFA Women's World Cup qualification	Estonia	1–1	Bosnia and Herzegovina	Pärnu, Estonia
20:00 UTC+3	Kubassova 10'	Report (FIFA); Report (UEFA)	Hasanbegović 23'	Stadium: Pärnu Rannastaadion; Referee: Michaela Pachtová (Czech Republic)

9 October Friendly	Montenegro	3–2	Bosnia and Herzegovina	Podgorica, Montenegro
13:00	Dešić 12'; Tomašević 26'; Kuč 90+2'	Report	Nikolić 23'; Ekić 75'	Stadium: DG Arena

== Coaching staff ==
=== Current coaching staff ===
Position	Name
Head coach	(Bosnia and Herzegovina) Selver Hodžić
Assistant coaches	(Bosnia and Herzegovina) Ivan Kvesić
Assistant coaches	(Bosnia and Herzegovina) Zoran Dimitrić
Assistant coaches	(Bosnia and Herzegovina) Alisa Spahić
Fitness coach	(Bosnia and Herzegovina) Almir Seferović

=== Managerial history ===
- (Bosnia and Herzegovina) Samira Hurem (2011–2024)
- (Bosnia and Herzegovina) Selver Hodžić (2024–present)

== Players ==
=== Current squad ===
- The following players were named to the squad for the friendly matches against Belarus and Greece on 26 November and 2 December 2025, respectively.

Caps and goals correct as of 4 June 2024 after the game against Malta.

No.	Pos.	Player	Date of birth (age)	Caps	Goals	Club
	GK	Almina Hodžić	2 November 1988 (age 37)	31	0	(Turkish Football Federation) Fatih Vatan Spor
	GK	Iman Dumanjić			0	(Turkish Football Federation) Giresun
	GK	Somea Položen			0	(Football Association of the Czech Republic) Sparta Prag
	DF	Nina Brnić	21 February 2006 (age 20)	0	0	(Croatian Football Federation) Hajduk Split
	DF	Samra Muhić			0	(Norwegian Football Federation) Arna Bjørnar
	DF	Emma Veletanlić	18 May 2003 (age 23)	1	0	(Danish Football Association) Kolding IF
	DF	Melisa Hasanbegović	13 April 1995 (age 31)	51	13	(Saudi Arabian Football Federation) Al-Ula
	DF	Đula Velagić	18 September 2001 (age 25)	19	0	(Football Association of Bosnia and Herzegovina) SFK 2000
	DF	Gloria Slišković	4 May 2005 (age 21)	21	0	(Italian Football Federation) Napoli
	DF	Ena Šabanagić	30 November 1997 (age 28)	16	0	(Hellenic Football Federation) Panathinaikos
	DF	Lana Radulović			0	(Football Association of Serbia) Spartak
	DF	Aldina Hamzić			0	(Austrian Football Association) RB Salzburg
	DF	Marija Milinković	16 November 2004 (age 21)	24	0	(Italian Football Federation) Inter Milan
	DF	Nikolina Milović	11 April 2000 (age 26)	6	0	(Turkish Football Federation) Giresun
	DF	Vina Crnoja			0	(Austrian Football Association) RB Salzburg
	DF	Andrea Ćule	22 March 2002 (age 24)	2	0	(Football Association of Bosnia and Herzegovina) Emina Mostar
	DF	Andrea Grebenar			0	(Croatian Football Federation) ŽNK Hajduk
	MF	Elma Husić	4 March 2002 (age 24)	2	0	(Football Association of Bosnia and Herzegovina) Emina Mostar
	MF	Nina Garibija			0	(Swedish Football Association) IF Djurgården
	MF	Milica Denda	11 December 2002 (age 23)		0	(Football Association of Bosnia and Herzegovina) Emina Mostar
	MF	Marija Aleksić	11 August 1997 (age 29)	35	2	(Turkish Football Federation) Beşiktaş
	MF	Ema Paljević			0	(French Football Federation) Nantes
	MF	Minela Gačanica	9 March 2000 (age 26)	20	2	(Hellenic Football Federation) PAOK
	FW	Sofija Krajšumović	12 July 2002 (age 24)	20	8	(Russian Football Union) CSKA Moscow
	FW	Milena Nikolić	6 July 1992 (age 34)	58	23	(Swiss Football Association) Basel

=== Recent call ups ===
The following players have also been called up to the Bosnia and Herzegovina squad within the last twelve months.

Pos.	Player	Date of birth (age)	Caps	Goals	Club	Latest call-up

== Records ==
*Active players in bold, statistics correct as of 2021.

=== Most capped players ===
#	Player	Year(s)	Caps

=== Top goalscorers ===
#	Player	Year(s)	Goals	Caps

== Competitive record ==
=== FIFA Women's World Cup ===
FIFA Women's World Cup record									Qualification record						
Year	Round	Pld	W	D	L	GF	GA	GD	Pld	W	D	L	GF	GA	GD
(China) 1991	did not enter								Declined participation						
(Sweden) 1995	did not enter								Declined participation						
(United States) 1999	did not qualify								8	1	0	7	5	55	−50
(United States) 2003	did not qualify								8	1	0	7	10	46	−36
(China) 2007	did not qualify								6	2	1	3	5	12	−7
(Germany) 2011	did not qualify								8	0	0	8	0	30	−30
(Canada) 2015	did not qualify								10	2	3	5	7	19	−12
(France) 2019	did not qualify								8	1	0	7	3	19	−16
(Australia) (New Zealand) 2023	did not qualify								8	3	2	3	9	17	−11
(Brazil) 2027	did not qualify								6	3	2	1	23	5	+18
(Costa Rica) (Jamaica) (Mexico) (United States) 2031	To be determined								To Be Determined						
(United Kingdom) 2035	To be determined								To Be Determined						
**Total**	**0/12**	**0**	**0**	**0**	**0**	**0**	**0**	**0**	**62**	**13**	**8**	**41**	**62**	**203**	**−141**

=== UEFA Women's Championship ===
UEFA Women's Championship record									Qualification record								
Year	Round	Pld	W	D	L	GF	GA	GD	Pld	W	D	L	GF	GA	GD	P/R	Rnk
(Denmark) 1991	Did not enter								Declined participation								
(Italy) 1993	Did not enter								Declined participation								
(Germany) 1995	Did not enter								Declined participation								
(Norway) (Sweden) 1997	Did not enter								Declined participation								
(Germany) 2001	Did not qualify								6	0	0	6	4	32	−28	–	
(England) 2005	Did not qualify								8	2	1	5	4	19	−15	–	
(Finland) 2009	Did not qualify								3	1	1	1	1	7	−6	–	
(Sweden) 2013	Did not qualify								10	3	1	6	12	21	−9	–	
(Netherlands) 2017	Did not qualify								8	3	0	5	8	17	−9	–	
(England) 2022	Did not qualify								10	6	0	4	19	17	+2	–	
(Switzerland) 2025	Did not qualify								8	2	2	4	7	15	−8	(Note: From Euro 2025 onwards a new qualifying format was introduced, linked to the Women's Nations League where teams are divided into leagues with promotion/relegation between the leagues at the end of each cycle.)	27th
2029	To be determined								To be determined								
Total	0/12	-	-	-	-	-	-	-	53	17	5	31	55	128	−73	27th	

=== UEFA Women's Nations League ===
UEFA Women's Nations League record
Year	League	Group	Pos	Pld	W	D	L	GF	GA	P/R	Rnk
2023–24	B	4	2nd	8	3	2	3	8	16	*	21st
2025	B	1	3rd	6	1	2	3	9	12	▼	27th
Total				14	4	4	6	17	28	21st and 27th	

▲	Promoted at end of season
Same position	No movement at end of season
▼	Relegated at end of season
*	Participated in promotion/relegation play-offs

== See also ==
- Sport in Bosnia and Herzegovina
  - Football in Bosnia and Herzegovina
    - Women's football in Bosnia and Herzegovina
- Bosnia and Herzegovina women's national under-19 football team
- Bosnia and Herzegovina women's national under-17 football team
- Bosnia and Herzegovina men's national football team
