= Sabina Pehić =

International sportswomen

Personal information
- Date of birth: January 5, 1974 (age 52)
- Place of birth: Maglaj, SFR Yugoslavia (now Bosnia and Herzegovina)
- Height: 1.70 m (5 ft 7 in)
- Position: Forward

Team information
- Current team: Bosnia and Herzegovina U17 (manager)

Senior career*
Years	Team	Apps	(Gls)
1996–?	ŽNK Mecca		
- Bugojno
- ŽNK Dinamo-Maksimir

International career
1989	Yugoslavia youth (football)		
1998–2009	Bosnia and Herzegovina (football)	101	(26)
- Bosnia and Herzegovina (handball)

Managerial career
- Bosnia and Herzegovina U17
- * Club domestic league appearances and goals

Sabina Pehić (born 5 January 1974) is a Bosnian retired professional footballer and handballer who played for both the Bosnia and Herzegovina women's national football team and the Bosnia and Herzegovina women's national handball team.

In football she played as a forward. By the end of 2006 Pehić had scored 26 goals in a record 38 appearances for the national football team. When she retired from the national football team she had earned over 100 caps.

In the 2000-01 season she won the football and handball league titles with her club Bugojno. She played her handball for clubs in Croatia, Germany and Bosnia and Herzegovina. In 2006 she played handball for ŽRK Željeznicar from Hadžići. Her club football she then played in Zagreb, for ŽNK Dinamo-Maksimir. In handball, she won four league titles in a row with Borac. She also won trophies with Galeb and Iskra. In 2018 at the age of 44 she made a comeback in handball, scoring nine goals for her club Neretva, where she is the coach. She also is a football coach, coaching the Bosnia and Herzegovina under-17s.
