= Selver Hodžić =

Swiss footballer (born 1978)

Personal information
- Date of birth: 12 October 1978 (age 48)
- Place of birth: Brčko, SFR Yugoslavia
- Height: 1.83 m (6 ft 0 in)
- Position: Defender

Senior career*
Years	Team	Apps	(Gls)
1997–1999	Zug 94	49	(4)
1999–2000	Luzern	8	(0)
2000	Buochs	14	(2)
2000–2002	Baden	43	(4)
2002–2007	Thun	125	(7)
2007–2008	Bnei Yehuda	12	(0)
2008–2010	Neuchâtel Xamax	35	(1)
2010–2011	Lugano	19	(0)
2011–2013	Wohlen	23	(0)
Total		328	(18)

Managerial career
- 2017–2019: Buochs
- 2024–: Bosnia and Herzegovina Women
- * Club domestic league appearances and goals

Selver Hodžić (born 12 October 1978) is a Bosnian-Herzegovinian and Swiss former professional footballer who played as a defender. He is currently the manager of the Bosnia and Herzegovina women's national team.

== Playing career ==
Born in Brčko, SR Bosnia and Herzegovina, Yugoslavia, Hodžić came to Switzerland as a war refugee in 1993. He played for Zug 94 until 1999, whereupon Hodžić played for a couple of other clubs before signing with FC Thun in 2002.

On 27 September 2005, Hodžić became FC Thun's hero with a dramatic winner in the 89th minute against Czech champions Sparta Prague.

On 25 June 2007, the player signed a two-year contract with Israeli Bnei Yehuda Tel Aviv F.C.

At the end of the season, he transferred back to Switzerland to Neuchâtel Xamax.

== Managerial career ==
Hodzic became a youth coach at Luzern and later manager of his former club Buochs, but left them in 2019.

In March, 2024 Hozdic became manager of the Bosnia & Herzegovina women's first team.
