= Vina Crnoja =

Croatian-Bosnia and Herzegovina footballer (born 2000)

Personal information
- Date of birth: 8 March 2000 (age 26)
- Place of birth: Croatia
- Position: Forward

Team information
- Current team: Amed
- Number: 10

Youth career
- 2007–2016: Mladost Nević Polje
- 2016: Emina Mostar
- 2016: Hohenmemmingen

Senior career*
Years	Team	Apps	(Gls)
2016–2021	Heidenheim		
2022–2024	Bergheim/USK Hof	34	(9)
2024–2025	Bergheim/Salzburg	8	(0)
2025–2026	Red Bull Salzburg	18	(5)
2026–	Amed	11	(3)

International career
2025–2026	Bosnia and Herzegovina		
- * Club domestic league appearances and goals as of 14 November 2026

Vina Crnoja (#7 white-red) of Red Bull Salzburg in 2025.

Vina Crnoja (born 8 March 2000) is a footballer who currently plays as a forward for Turkish Women's Super League club Amed. Born in Croatia, she represents Bosnia and Herzegovina at international level.

== Club career ==
Crnoja started football playing at the age of seven joining the newly established local club Mladost Nević Polje. Her team reached the top division of Bosnia and Herzegovina when she was at 13 years of age.

After settling in Germany with her family in 2016, she spent several months traveling from Germany by bus to play in matches for her new club, Emina Mostar in Bosnia and Herzegovina. She later searched online for a club in Germany, subsequently playing for the local club Hohenmemmingen. She then joined the junior girls' team of the local club Heidenheim, and played five years long in senior team in the tier-six Verbandsliga.

In 2021, her coach brought her along to Bergheim/USK Hof (2022–2024) in Austria, where she developed into one of the top goalscorers in the ÖFB Frauen Bundesliga. She played for Bergheim/Salzburg (2024–2025), and after Red Bull Salzburg took over Bergheim/Salzburg, for Red Bull Salzburg (2025–2026).

Late July 2026, she moved to Turkey, and signed a one-year contract with the Diyarbakır-based club Amed, which compete in the topflight Women's Super League. Before the begin of the 2026–27 season, she took part at a preparation camp of her new team in Kayseri, Turkey.

== International career ==
As part of the Bosnia and Herzegovina national team, she played at the 2027 FIFA Women's World Cup qualification – UEFA League C, and scored a penalty goal in the match against Liechtenstein that ended 13-1 for her team.

== Personal life ==
Cranoja was born in Croatia on 8 March 2000. In 2016, she moved with her family from Jajce in Bosnia and Herzegovina to Hohenmemmingen village of Heidenheim district in Baden-Württemberg, Germany, where the family settled, and she lived many years.

During her football playing time in Salzburg, Austria, she jobbed in warehouse logistics of Porsche car company.
