= Janja Čanjevac =

Croatian footballer (born 2000)

Personal information
- Date of birth: 14 November 2000 (age 26)
- Place of birth: Varaždin, Croatia
- Position: Defender

Team information
- Current team: Hajduk
- Number: 17

Youth career
- Dinamo Zagreb

Senior career*
| Years | Team | Apps | (Gls) |
| –2018 | Dinamo Zagreb | | |
| 2018–2022 | Split | | |
| 2021 | → Donat (loan) | | |
| 2022 | → Pomurje (loan) | 7 | (1) |
| 2022– | Hajduk | | |

International career^{‡}
| 2016 | Croatia U16 | 3 | (0) |
| 2016 | Croatia U17 | 7 | (0) |
| 2016 | Croatia U18 | 3 | (0) |
| 2017–2018 | Croatia U19 | 10 | (0) |
| 2017– | Croatia | 7 | (0) |
- * Club domestic league appearances and goals as of 21 May 2022 ‡ National team caps and goals as of 4 May 2022

Janja Čanjevac (born 14 November 2000) is a Croatian footballer who plays as a defender for Hajduk and the Croatia women's national team.

== International career ==
Čanjevac made her senior debut for Croatia on 27 July 2017. She also played for the team during the UEFA Women's Euro 2022 qualifying.
