= Ena Šabanagić =

Bosnia and Herzegovina footballer (born 1997)

Personal information
- Date of birth: January 1, 1997 (age 29)
- Place of birth: Hanover Park, Illinois, USA
- Height: 1.75 m (5 ft 9 in)
- Position: Right back

Team information
- Current team: Panathinaikos
- Number: 2

College career
| Years | Team | Apps | (Gls) |
| 2016–2021 | Purdue Boilermakers | 61 | (5) |

Senior career*
| Years | Team | Apps | (Gls) |
| 2021–2022 | HK Kópavogur | | |
| 2022–2023 | SFK 2000 | 10 | (2) |
| 2023–2024 | Fomget Gençlik ve Spor | 29 | (1) |
| 2024–2025 | SFK 2000 | 10 | (3) |
| 2025 | Beylerbeyi | 4 | (0) |
| 2025– | Panathinaikos | 14 | (0) |

International career
| 2022– | Bosnia and Herzegovina | 22 | (0) |
- * Club domestic league appearances and goals as of 4 June 2026

Ena Šabanagić (born 1 January 1999) is a footballer who plays as a defender for Panathinaikos in the Greek A Division. Born in the United States, she is a Bosnia and Herzegovina international.

== Early life ==
She was born in 1999 in the United States. She started playing football at the age of five.

== Club career ==
In 2021, she signed for Bosnia and Herzegovina side SFK 2000. In 2023, she signed for Turkish side Fomget Gençlik ve Spor.

== International career ==
She is a Bosnia and Herzegovina international. She was eligible to represent the United States internationally.

== Style of play ==
She mainly operates as a defender or midfielder. She is known for her versatility.

== Personal life ==
She is a native of Chicago, United States. .
