= Romania women's national football team =

Women's national association football team representing Romania

Romania
- Association: Romanian Football Federation
- Confederation: UEFA (Europe)
- Head coach: Massimo Pedrazzini
- Captain: Ioana Bortan
- Most caps: Florentina Spânu (201)
- Top scorer: Gabriela Enache (57)
- Home stadium: Arcul de Triumf Stadium
- FIFA code: ROU
First colours	Second colours	Third colours

FIFA ranking
- Current: 53 (20 October 2026)
- Highest: 31 (May 2006)
- Lowest: 52 (June 2025; December 2025)

First international
- Romania 4–1 Moldova (Romania; 10 September 1990)

Biggest win
- Romania 13–0 Turkmenistan (Turkey; 27 February 2019)

Biggest defeat
- Denmark 8–0 Romania (Denmark; 10 October 1995); Sweden 8–0 Romania (Sweden; 15 October 1995); Iceland 8–0 Romania (Iceland; 30 September 2000)

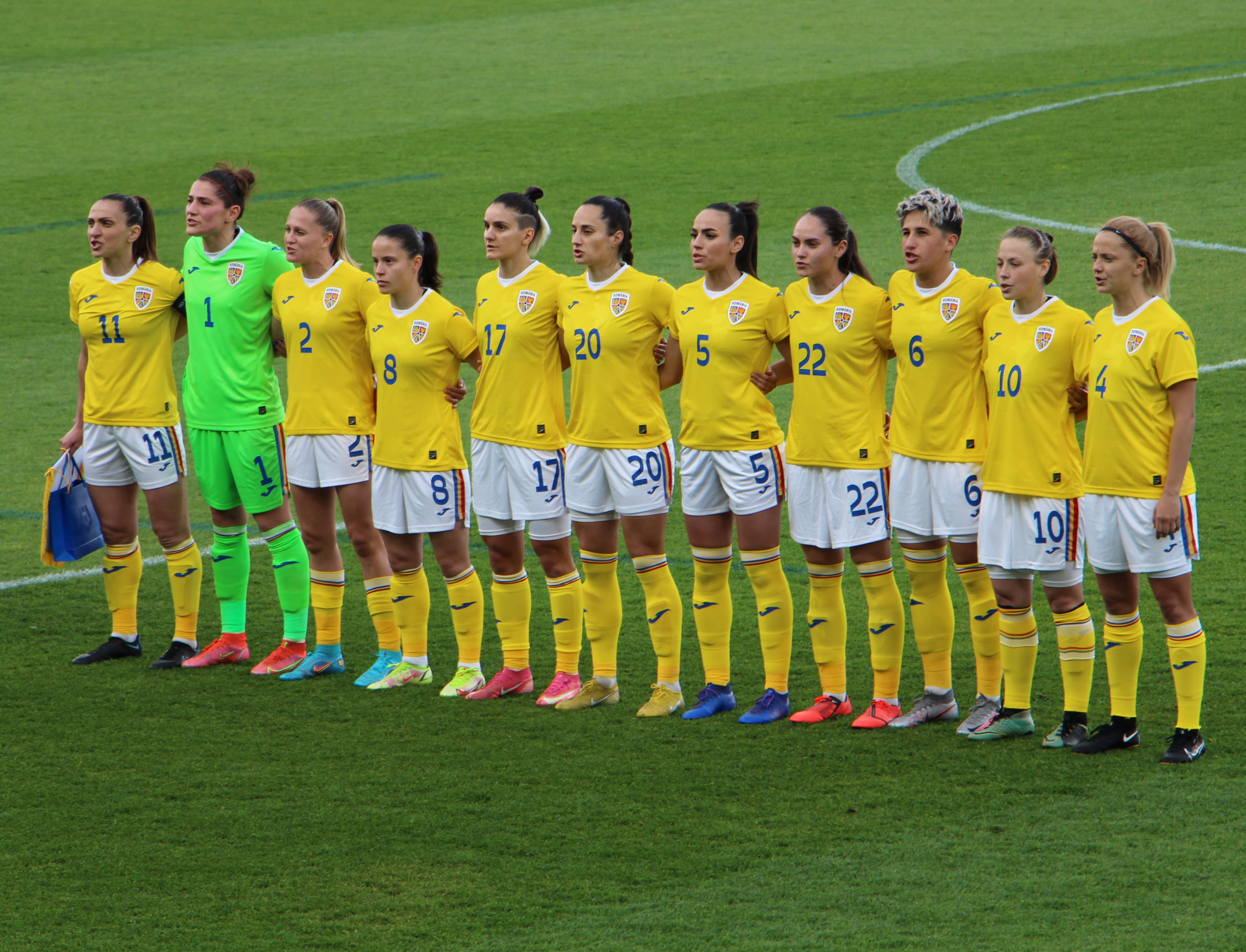
Romania women's national football team

The Romania women's national football team represents Romania in international women's football. Their most recent competition is qualification for the UEFA Women's Euro 2025. Despite not gaining as much success as the men's, the women's team has been improving greatly, and almost qualified for UEFA Women's Euro and FIFA Women's World Cup. The rise of women's team is the chance for Romania to become the first Balkan nation to play on an international competitions, and become the first nation to have both men and women's teams participating in both tournaments. The only rival for them in the Balkans, is Serbia, as Serbian women's team had almost qualified for a major tournament recently.

== Results and fixtures ==
The following is a list of match results in the last 12 months, as well as any future matches that have been scheduled.

Legend

Win Draw Loss Fixture

=== 2025 ===
28 November 2025 Friendly	Montenegro	1-0	Romania	Podgorica, Montenegro
14:00			Dokovic 18'	Stadium: Podgorica City Stadium

2 December 2025 Friendly	Romania	2–0	Moldova	Voluntari, Romania
	Bălăceanu 3'; Ciolacu 39'	Report		Stadium: Anghel Iordănescu Stadium; Referee: Réka Molnar (Hungary)

=== 2026 ===
3 March 2026 2027 FIFA World Cup qualification - UEFA League C5	Romania	1–0	Moldova	Bucharest, Romania
18:00	Bălăceanu 54'	Report		Stadium: Arcul de Triumf; Referee: Sofiya Prychyna (Ukraine)

7 March 2026 2027 FIFA World Cup qualification - UEFA League C5	Cyprus	0–4	Romania	Achna, Cyprus
14:00		Report	Bălăceanu 12', 74'; Ciolacu 40' (pen.); Vlădulescu 58'	Stadium: Dasaki Stadium; Referee: Eszter Urban (Hungary)

18 April 2026 2027 FIFA World Cup qualification - UEFA League C5	Romania	3–0	Cyprus	Bucharest, Romania
16:00	Vlădulescu 5'; Stancu 85'; Ciolacu 90'	Report		Stadium: Arcul de Triumf; Referee: Nadine Reichmuth (Switzerland)

5 June 2026 2027 FIFA World Cup qualification - UEFA League C5	Moldova	0–0	Romania	Nisporeni, Moldova
18:00		Report		Stadium: Nisporeni Central Stadium; Referee: Sapir Gaya Berman (Israel)

9 October 2027 FIFA Women's World Cup play-offs	Romania	0–2	Norway	Bucharest, Romania
20:00 UTC+3		Report	Reiten 10'; Maanum 34'	Stadium: Arcul de Triumf Stadium; Referee: Emily Heaslip (England)

13 October 2027 FIFA Women's World Cup play-offs	Norway	6–0	Romania	Oslo, Norway
18:00	Jensen 3'; Terland 9', 12', 54' (pen.); Østenstad 66'; Blakstad 70'	Report (FIFA); Report (UEFA)		Stadium: Ullevaal Stadion; Referee: Olivia Tschon (Austria)

=== 2027 FIFA World Cup qualification ===
==== Group C5 ====
Pos	Team	Pld	W	D	L	GF	GA	GD	Pts	Promotion or qualification
1	Romania (P)	4	3	1	0	8	0	+8	10	Advance to play-offs and promotion to League B
2	Moldova	4	1	2	1	2	1	+1	5	
3	Cyprus	4	0	1	3	0	9	−9	1	

Source: UEFA
Rules for classification: Tiebreakers
(P) Promoted

== Coaching staff ==
=== Current coaching staff ===
Role	Name	Ref.
Head coach	Massimo Pedrazzini	
Assistant coaches	Iulia Mera; Irina Giurgiu	
Goalkeeping coach		
Physical coach		

=== Managerial history ===
- Italy Massimo Pedrazzini (2024–present)
- Romania Cristian Dulca (2021–2024)
- Romania Mirel Albon (2015–2021)
- Romania Maria Delicoiu (2007–2014)
- Romania Gheorghe Staicu (2002–2007)
- Romania Virgil Popescu,
  Romania Maria Delicoiu (1999–2002)
- Romania Ion Nunweiller (1996–1998)
- Romania Virgil Popescu,
  Romania Iulian Vîlcu (1992–1996)
- Romania Virgil Popescu (1990–1992)

== Players ==
=== Current squad ===
The following players were called up for the matches against Moldova and Cyprus on 3 and 7 March 2026.

Caps and goals correct as of 7 March 2026, after the match against Cyprus.

No.	Pos.	Player	Date of birth (age)	Caps	Goals	Club
1	GK	Andreea Părăluță	27 November 1994 (age 31)	50	0	(Danish Football Association) Fortuna Hjørring
23	GK	Sara Câmpean	16 July 2003 (age 23)	2	0	(Romanian Football Federation) CSM Unirea Alba Iulia
12	GK	Cosmina Roșu	10 May 2002 (age 24)	0	0	(Romanian Football Federation) Politehnica Timișoara
2	DF	Maria Ficzay	8 November 1991 (age 35)	125	0	(Cyprus Football Association) Apollon Ladies Limassol
18	DF	Teodora Nicoară	3 August 1999 (age 27)	31	0	(Turkish Football Federation) Beşiktaş
17	DF	Claudia Bistrian	31 August 1996 (age 30)	16	0	(Romanian Football Federation) CSM Unirea Alba Iulia
6	DF	Ana Maria Stanciu	6 July 1987 (age 39)	15	0	(Romanian Football Federation) Farul Constanța
13	DF	Erika Geréd	28 April 1999 (age 27)	23	1	(Romanian Football Federation) AFK Csíkszereda
18	DF	Antonia Bratu	7 October 2004 (age 22)	10	0	(Romanian Football Federation) Farul Constanța
22	DF	Simona Sigheartău	3 January 2005 (age 21)	1	0	(Romanian Football Federation) U Olimpia Cluj
3	MF	Cristina Botojel	10 October 2004 (age 22)	2	0	(Romanian Football Federation) Farul Constanța
8	MF	Mihaela Ciolacu	12 August 1998 (age 28)	46	9	(Romanian Football Federation) Atletic Olimpia Gherla
9	MF	Olga Iordăchiuși	26 November 1988 (age 37)	6	0	(Cyprus Football Association) Omonia Nicosia
10	MF	Ioana Bălăceanu	11 July 2003 (age 23)	14	7	(Romanian Football Federation) Farul Constanța
21	MF	Ana Maria Vlădulescu	4 March 2001 (age 25)	23	4	(Romanian Football Federation) AFK Csíkszereda
22	MF	Ioana Stancu	8 December 2006 (age 19)	3	0	(Romanian Football Federation) Farul Constanța
24	MF	Sonia Bumbar	25 May 2005 (age 21)	3	0	(Romanian Football Federation) U Olimpia Cluj
19	MF	Anita Antal	16 October 2000 (age 26)	1	0	(Romanian Football Federation) AFK Csíkszereda
8	MF	Ștefania Vătafu	12 July 1993 (age 33)	130	10	(Royal Belgian Football Association) Anderlecht
	MF	Oana Negrea	28 September 2005 (age 21)	1	0	(Romanian Football Federation) Rapid Bucuresti
11	FW	Carmen Marcu	30 August 2001 (age 25)	20	2	(Romanian Football Federation) U Olimpia Cluj
7	FW	Adina Borodi	20 November 2004 (age 22)	5	0	(Romanian Football Federation) U Olimpia Cluj

- -

=== Recent call ups ===
The following players have also been called up to the squad within the past 12 months.

Pos.	Player	Date of birth (age)	Caps	Goals	Club	Latest call-up
DF	Anita Kis	25 February 2002 (age 24)	0	0	(Romania) AFK Csíkszereda	v. Ukraine, 28 October 2025
DF	Anda Jivan	15 September 2000 (age 26)	0	0	(Romania) Politehnica Timișoara	v. Moldova, 2 December 2025
MF	Andrea Herczeg	13 September 1994 (age 32)	28	3	(Romania) AFK Csíkszereda	v. Moldova, 3 December 2025
FW	Cristina Carp	28 July 1997 (age 29)	33	3	(Switzerland) FC Luzern	v. Moldova, 3 December 2025
FW	Bianca Ienovan	28 November 2005 (age 20)	0	0	(Romania) Politehnica Timișoara	v. Moldova, 3 December 2025
Notes: ^{INJ} = Withdrew due to injury; ^{PRE} = Preliminary squad; ^{RET} = Retired from the national team; ^{SBY} = Standby player

== Records ==
*Active players in bold, statistics correct as of 27 October 2021.

=== Most capped players ===
#	Player	Year(s)	Caps

=== Top goalscorers ===
#	Player	Year(s)	Goals	Caps

== Competitive record ==
=== FIFA Women's World Cup ===
Year	Round	Position	MP	W	D	L	GF	GA	Qual. Round	Position	MP	W	D	L	GF	GA
China 1991	Did not enter								via 1991 UEFA Women's Championship
Sweden 1995	Did not qualify								via 1995 UEFA Women's Championship
United States 1999	Unable to qualify								Group 8/Playoff B	1st/lost	10	5	3	2	32	12
United States 2003	Unable to qualify								Group 7	4th	8	2	2	4	18	13
China 2007	Unable to qualify								Group 7	2nd	6	3	0	3	14	10
Germany 2011	Did not qualify								Group 4	4th	8	2	2	4	14	13
Canada 2015	Did not qualify								Group 2	2nd	10	3	2	5	18	11
France 2019	Did not qualify								Group 6	4th	8	1	2	5	7	15
Australia **20**; New Zealand **23** (2023)	Did not qualify								Group G	3rd	10	6	1	3	21	11
Brazil 2027	To be determined								To be determined
United StatesMexicoCosta RicaJamaica 2031	To be determined								To be determined
United Kingdom 2035	To be determined								To be determined
**Total**											**60**	**22**	**12**	**26**	**124**	**85**

=== UEFA Women's Championship ===
UEFA Women's Championship record									Qualifying record
Year	Round	Position	Pld	W	D	L	GF	GA	Qual. Round	Position	Pld	W	D	L	GF	GA	P/R	Rnk
Denmark 1984	Did not enter								Did not enter
Norway 1987	Did not enter								Did not enter
West Germany 1989	Did not enter								Did not enter
Denmark 1991	Did not enter								Did not enter
Italy 1993	Did not qualify								Group 3	2nd	4	1	3	0	2	1	–
Germany 1995	Did not qualify								Group 2	2nd	6	3	2	1	16	5	–
Norway Sweden 1997	Did not qualify								Group 4/Playoff AB	4th/lost	8	1	1	6	7	35	–
Germany 2001	Unable to qualify								Group 7/Playoff AB	1st/lost	10	7	2	1	36	15	–
England 2005	Unable to qualify								Group 5	2nd	8	5	3	0	29	5	–
Finland 2009	Did not qualify								Group A4/Group 2	1st/4th	11	4	1	6	18	29	–
Sweden 2013	Did not qualify								Group 2	3rd	10	5	1	4	20	20	–
Netherlands 2017	Did not qualify								Group 3/ Playoff	2nd/lost	10	5	3	2	18	9	–
England 2022	Did not qualify								Group H	3rd	8	4	0	4	13	16	–
Switzerland 2025	Did not qualify								Group C4 / Playoff	1st/lost	8	6	0	2	18	7	▲ (Note: From Euro 2025 onwards a new qualifying format was introduced, linked to the Women's Nations League where teams are divided into leagues with promotion/relegation between the leagues at the end of each cycle.)	34th
(Germany) 2029	To be determined								To be determined
Total	–	–	–	–	–	–	–	–	–		83	41	16	26	177	142	34th

=== UEFA Women's Nations League ===
UEFA Women's Nations League record
Year	League	Group	Pos	Pld	W	D	L	GF	GA	P/R	Rnk
2023–24	B	2	4th	6	0	1	5	1	11	▼	31st
2025	B	1	To be determined								
Total				6	0	1	5	1	11	31st	

▲	Promoted at end of season
Same position	No movement at end of season
▼	Relegated at end of season
*	Participated in promotion/relegation play-offs

== See also ==
- Sport in Romania
  - Football in Romania
    - Women's football in Romania
- Romania women's national under-19 football team
- Romania women's national under-17 football team
