= Andrea Glibo =

Croatian footballer (born 2002)

Personal information
- Date of birth: 5 April 2002 (age 24)
- Place of birth: Hall in Tirol, Austria
- Height: 1.64 m (5 ft 5 in)
- Position: Forward

Team information
- Current team: FK Austria Wien
- Number: 10

Youth career
- 2011–2015: Rum
- 2015–2017: Wacker Innsbruck

Senior career*
Years	Team	Apps	(Gls)
2017–2021	Wacker Innsbruck	17	(10)
2021–2024	Sturm Graz	32	(14)
2024–2026	SKN St. Pölten		
2026–	FK Austria Wien		

International career^{‡}
2019–	Croatia U19	3	(0)
2019–	Croatia	14	(0)
- * Club domestic league appearances and goals as of 17:30, 29 May 2024 (UTC) ‡ National team caps and goals as of 17:30, 29 May 2024 (UTC)

Andrea Glibo (born 5 April 2002) is a Croatian footballer who plays as a forward for Austrian ÖFB-Frauenliga club FK Austria Wien and the Croatia women's national team.
