= Marija Aleksić =

Bosnian footballer (born 1997)

Marija Aleksic
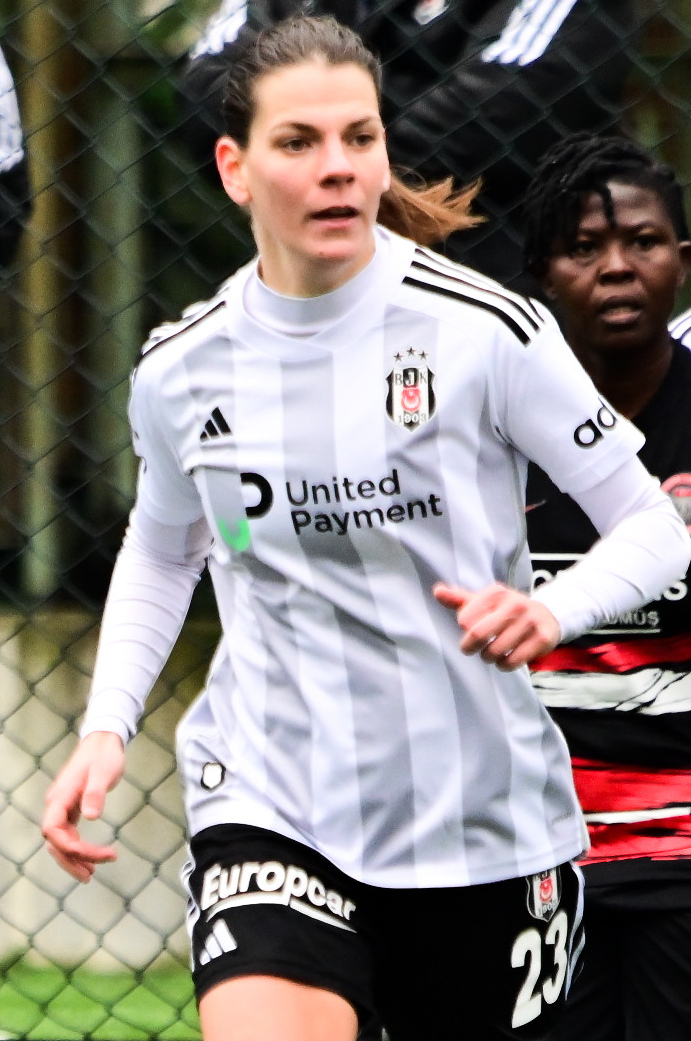

Personal information
- Full name: Marija Aleksić
- Date of birth: 11 August 1997 (age 29)
- Place of birth: Bosnia and Herzegovina, Banja Luka
- Height: 1.70 m (5 ft 7 in)
- Position: Defender

Team information
- Current team: Beşiktaş J.K.
- Number: 23

Senior career*
Years	Team	Apps	(Gls)
2014–2016	ŽFK Banja Luka	21	(6)
2016–2020	Ferencváros	90	(12)
2020–2022	Arna-Bjørnar	28	(3)
2023	SFK 2000 Sarajevo	8	(6)
2023–	Beşiktaş J.K.	23	(7)

International career^{‡}
2015–	Bosnia and Herzegovina	30	(2)
- * Club domestic league appearances and goals as of 5 May 2024 ‡ National team caps and goals as of 17 February 2024

Marija Aleksić (born 11 August 1997, Banja Luka) is a Bosnian footballer who plays as a midfielder and has appeared for the Bosnia and Herzegovina women's national team since 2015. She plays for Beşiktaş J.K.

== Career ==
Aleksić has been capped for the Bosnia and Herzegovina national team, appearing for the team during the 2019 FIFA Women's World Cup qualifying cycle.

Marija Aleksic transferred to Beşiktaş J.K. in July 2023. The professional player plays in the defensive midfielder position in her team.
