= Achna =

Achna: Άχνα (Greek); Düzce (Turkish)
- Location in Cyprus
- Coordinates: 35°3′19″N 33°47′4″E
- Country (de jure): Cyprus
  - District: Famagusta District
- Time zone: UTC+2 (EET)
  - Summer (DST): UTC+3 (EEST)

Achna (Greek: Άχνα; Turkish: Düzce) is an abandoned village in the Famagusta District of Cyprus. It is just north of the Buffer Zone and is under the de facto control of Northern Cyprus. After the 1974 Turkish invasion, its displaced inhabitants built a new village nearby.

== New village ==
The inhabitants of Achna built a provisional tent village in the Achna forest (Dasaki tis Achnas), some hundred meters from their old village, and later started to build a new village, Dasaki Achnas, near the old location, within the confines of the Dhekelia Sovereign Base Area.

Dasaki Achnas' population in 2011 was 2,087.

== Sports ==
Achna is known for its football club, Ethnikos Achna FC.

== Gallery ==
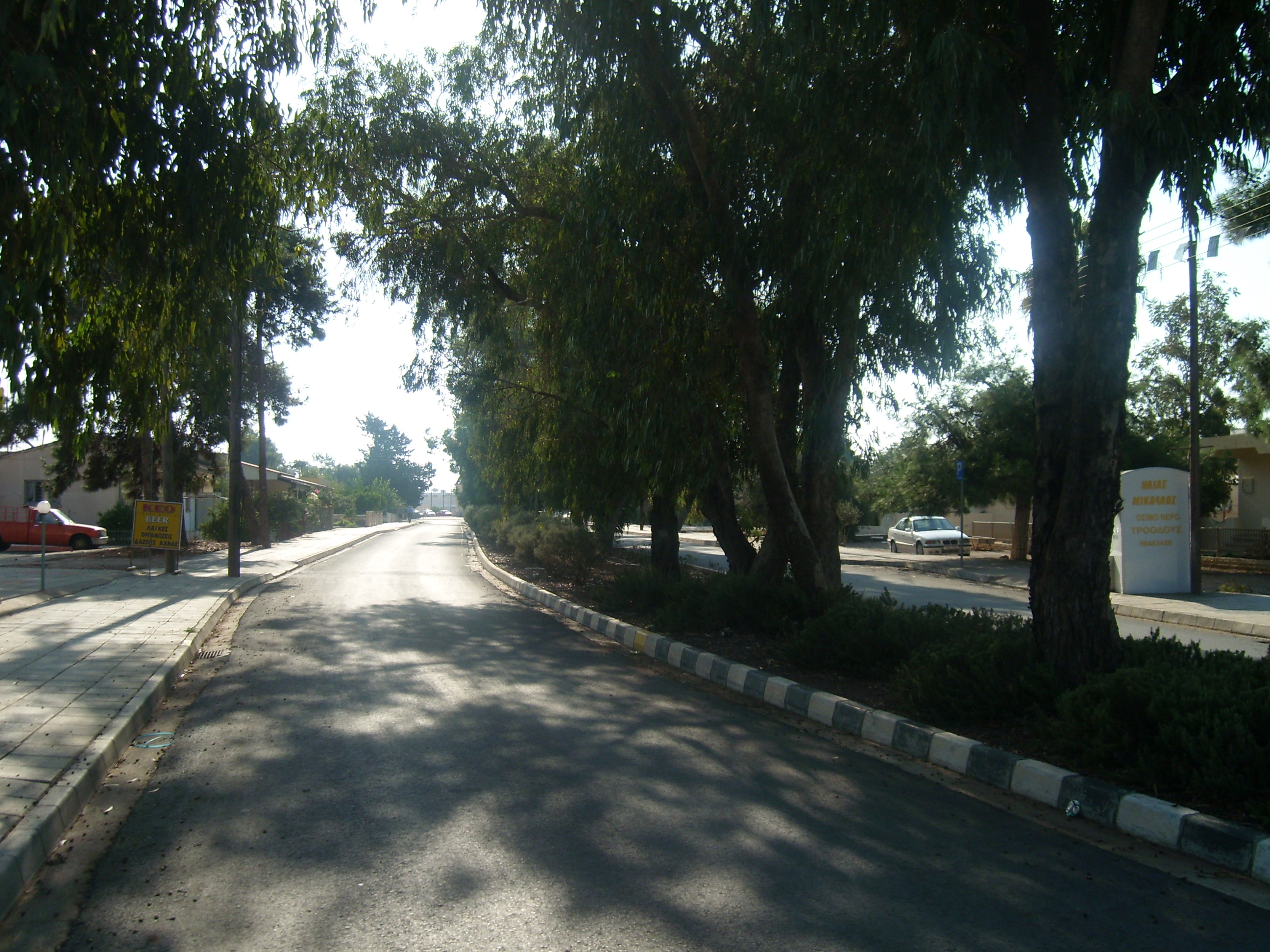
Dasaki Achnas main street

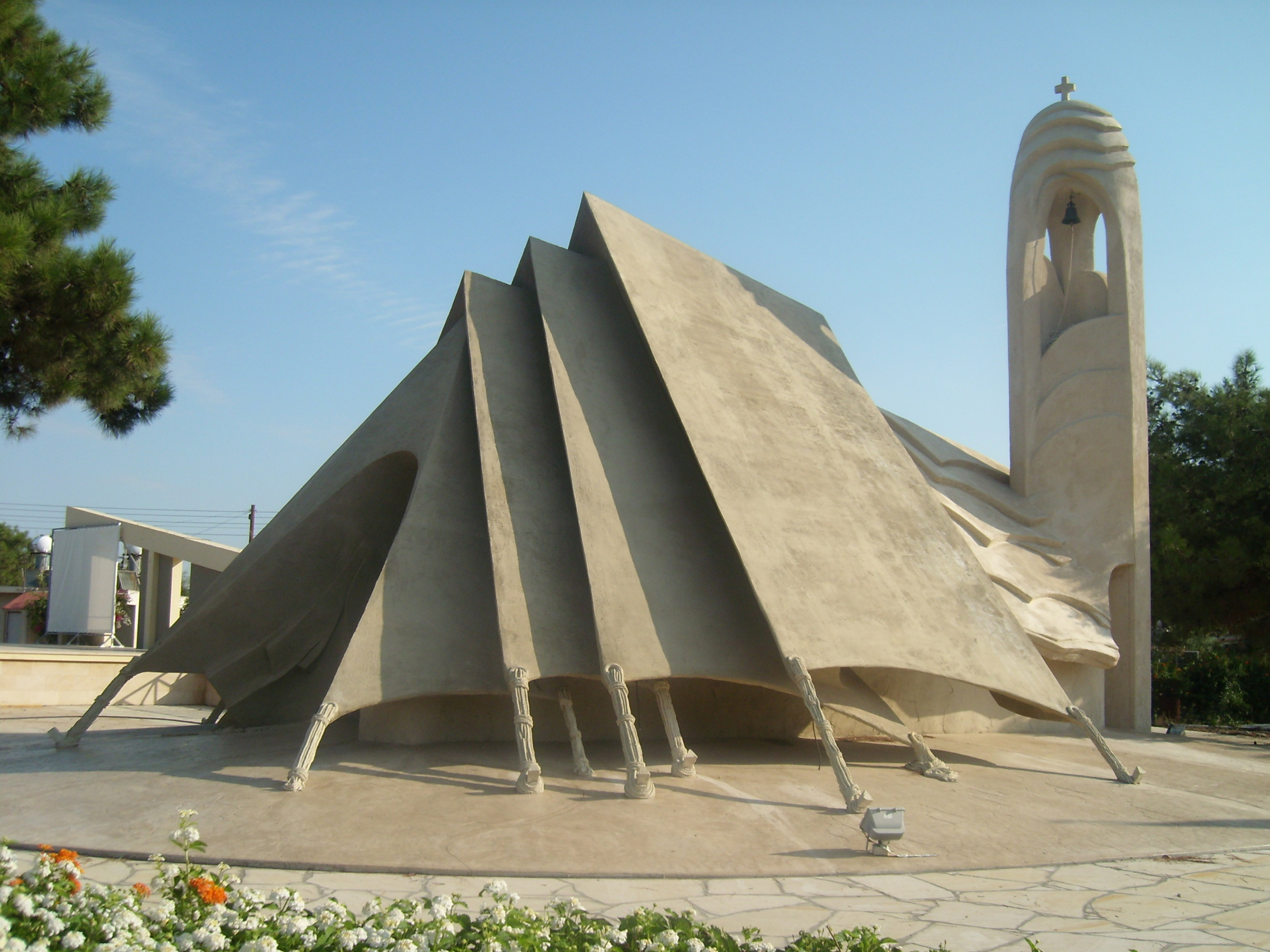
Memorial church in the shape of a tent in Dasaki Achnas
