= Bosnia and Herzegovina FA Training Centre =

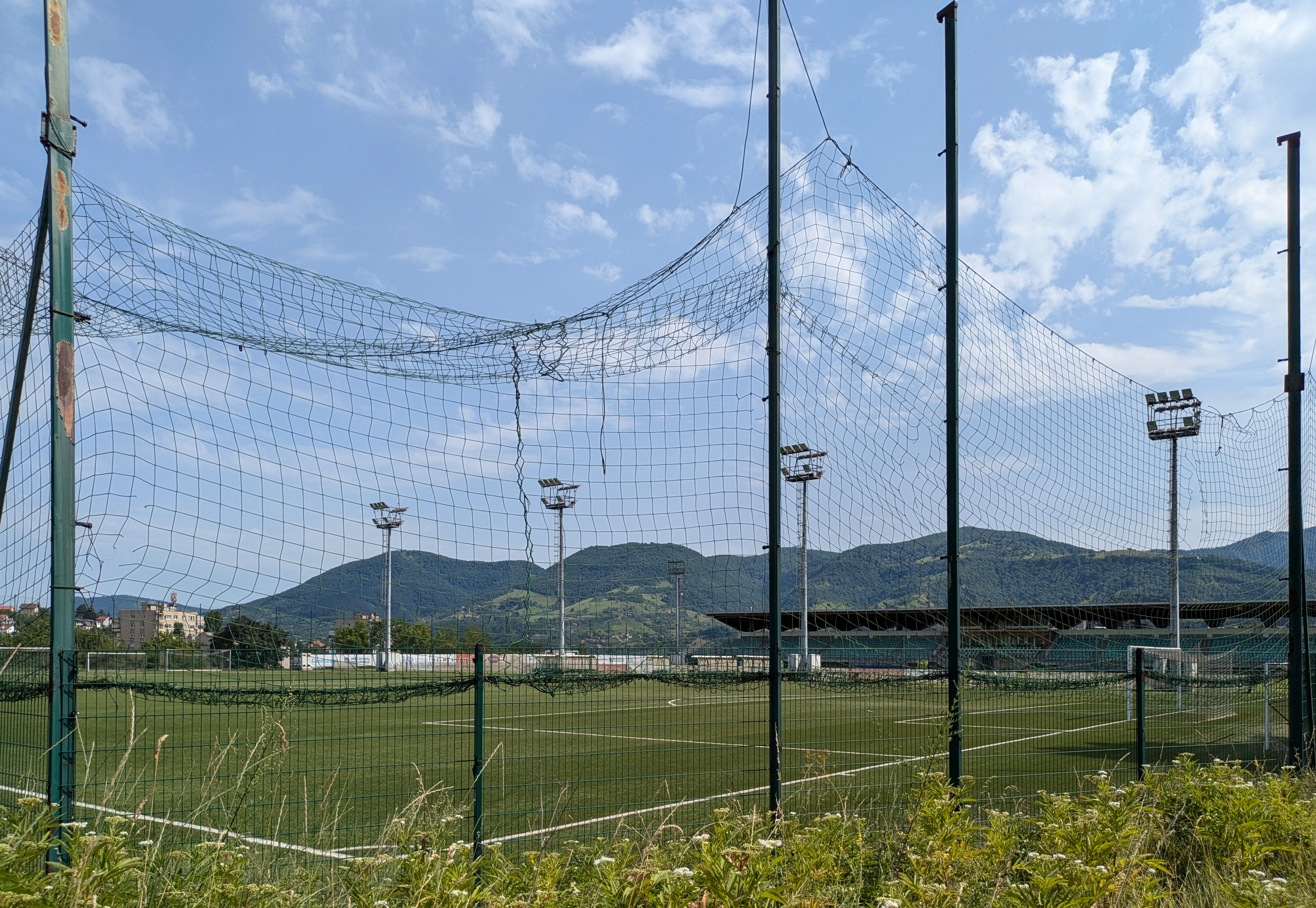
- Interactive map of Bosnia and Herzegovina FA Training Centre
- Full name: Trening centar Nogometnog/Fudbalskog saveza Bosne i Hercegovine; Тренинг центар Ногометног/Фудбалског савеза Босне и Херцеговине
- Address: Crkvice bb, Crkvičko brdo 72000
- Location: Zenica, Bosnia & Herzegovina
- Coordinates: 44.205°N 17.920°E
- Owner: Football Association of Bosnia and Herzegovina
- Capacity: 1.500
- Type: Football training ground

Construction
- Opened: 2 September 2013
- Expanded: 21 September 2015
- Cost: 5 million euros (2013)

Tenants
- Football Association of Bosnia and Herzegovina

Website
- Official website

The Bosnia and Herzegovina FA Training Centre (Bosnian: Trening centar Nogometnog/Fudbalskog saveza Bosne i Hercegovine; Cyrillic: Тренинг центар Ногометног/Фудбалског савеза Босне и Херцеговине) is the training ground of the Football Association of Bosnia and Herzegovina located in the Crkvičko brdo neighbourhood of Zenica, Zenica-Doboj Canton, Bosnia and Herzegovina. The centre was officially inaugurated on 2 September 2013 by then-president of UEFA, Michel Platini, after the first stage of construction was completed.

== History ==
The Football Association of Bosnia and Herzegovina, aware of the fact that it did not own training facilities for its national team selections, drafted out plans for the construction of a modern training centre in the mid-2000s, quickly securing funds for the project and deciding on the location. A suburb of Zenica was chosen because the town's Bilino Polje Stadium was the national team's home ground at the time. The implementation of the project coincided with large-scale, politically motivated turbulences in the organization that eventually led to a FIFA-issued short-term suspension on all competitive national team selections. The instability in the governing body of Bosnian football led to the shelving of the project, for it to reemerge only after an UEFA-sponsored Normalization Committee was formed, which included the likes of Ivica Osim, Dušan Bajević, Faruk Hadžibegić, Darko Ljubojević and Sead Kajtaz. The committee, being assigned full executive power as a means for solving the aforementioned issues in the FA, immediately sped up the training centre project, with construction beginning in early 2011. Construction was completed in late 2013, with the centre being officially inaugurated by Michel Platini on 2 September 2013. On 21 September 2015, after a two-year expansion project, new facilities, including an indoor arena were opened.

== Facilities ==
The training centre consists of one artificial and two natural turf pitches, an indoor Futsal arena, terraces, a 27-room hotel, wellness centre, restaurant, indoor and outdoor cafés, two large conference rooms, a recreational lobby and designated administration and technical premises. Furthermore, it is encompassed by a large private parking lot, entrance gates and a main square. On 23 October 2015 the centre was granted UEFA and FIFA PRO licences, and has subsequently hosted women's and youth qualifiers.
