= Estonia women's national football team results =

This is a summary of the Estonia women's national football team results.

== Results ==
=== 2013 ===
20 September 2013 2015 FIFA World Cup qualification	Estonia	1–5	Italy	Tallinn, Estonia
18:00	Loo 88'	Report	Mauro 57'; Gabbiadini 68', 72'; Rosucci 70'; Bonansea 77'	Stadium: A. Le Coq Arena; Attendance: 1,717; Referee: Séverine Zinck (France)

27 October 2013 2015 FIFA World Cup qualification	Spain	6–0	Estonia	Madrid, Spain
12:00	Bermúdez 14', 58' (pen.); Torrejón 28'; Hermoso 45'; Natalia 72'; Paredes 81'	Report		Stadium: Ciudad Deportiva; Attendance: 1,000; Referee: Sofia Karagiorgi (Cyprus)

30 October 2013 2015 FIFA World Cup qualification	North Macedonia	0–2	Estonia	Strumica, Macedonia
13:00		Report	Jekimova 8'; Loo 58'	Stadium: Stadion Mladost; Attendance: 100; Referee: Petra Chudá (Slovakia)

=== 2014 ===
1 March 2014 Friendly	Estonia	8–2	Latvia	Tallinn, Estonia
13:30	Spruntule 11' (o.g.); Loo 29', 38'; Aarna 56', 67', 89'; Sõrmus 82'; Kesvatera 90+1'	Report	Seredina 49'; Fedotova 64'	Stadium: EJL Jalgpallihall; Attendance: 83; Referee: Reelika Turi (Estonia)

3 March 2014 Friendly	Northern Ireland	1–0	Estonia	Belfast, Northern Ireland
15:00	Venney 86'	Report		Stadium: Newforge Country Club; Referee: Ruthanne Wright (Northern Ireland)

5 March 2014 Friendly	Northern Ireland	1–0	Estonia	Bangor, Northern Ireland
19:45	Mackin 68'	Report		Stadium: Clandeboye Park; Referee: Ruthanne Wright (Northern Ireland)

26 April 2014 2015 FIFA World Cup qualification	Czech Republic	6–0	Estonia	Opava, Czech Republic
16:00	Kožárová 3'; Cahynová 12'; Krejčiříková 24', 41'; Svitková 26', 72'	Report		Stadium: Stadion v Městských sadech Referee: Eleni Lampadariou (Greece)

8 May 2014 2015 FIFA World Cup qualification	Estonia	0–5	Spain	Tallinn, Estonia
18:00		Report	Losada 21', 59'; Natalia 32', 35'; Hermoso 63'	Stadium: A. Le Coq Arena; Attendance: 896; Referee: Amy Fearn (England)

7 June 2014 2014 Baltic Cup	Latvia	0–4	Estonia	Šiauliai, Lithuania
16:00		Report	Jaadla 20'; Bannikova 43'; Palmaru 45+1'; Kubassova 80'	Stadium: Savivaldybė Stadium; Referee: Jurgita Macikunyere (Lithuania)

8 June 2014 2014 Baltic Cup	Estonia	3–0	Lithuania	Šiauliai, Lithuania
15:00	Vals 2'; Palmaru 35'; Bannikova 88'	Report		Stadium: Savivaldybė Stadium; Referee: Justina Lavrenovaite (Lithuania)

15 June 2014 2015 FIFA World Cup qualification	Estonia	1–1	North Macedonia	Haapsalu, Estonia
16:00	Loo 3'	Report	Andonova 39'	Stadium: Haapsalu Stadium; Attendance: 140; Referee: Paula Brady (Ireland)

19 June 2014 2015 FIFA World Cup qualification	Estonia	0–2	Romania	Haapsalu, Estonia
18:00		Report	Dușa 29', 38'	Stadium: Haapsalu Stadium; Attendance: 105; Referee: Leen Martens (Belgium)

16 July 2014 Friendly	Poland	5–1	Estonia	Pruszków, Poland
11:00	Płonowska 13'; Pajor 28', 52', 55'; Balcerzak 47'	Report	Aarna 76'	Stadium: Stadion Pruszków; Attendance: 327; Referee: Monica Mularczyk (Poland)

20 August 2014 2015 FIFA World Cup qualification	Estonia	1–4	Czech Republic	Tallinn, Estonia
	Aarna 72'	Report	Svitková 22', 26', 69'; Raadik 81' (o.g.)	Stadium: A. Le Coq Arena; Attendance: 387; Referee: Yuliya Medvedeva-Keldyusheva (Kazakhstan)

13 September 2014 2015 FIFA World Cup qualification	Italy	4–0	Estonia	Vercelli, Italy
14:00	Bonansea 6'; Zlidnis 8' (o.g.); Cernoia 27'; Manieri 65'	Report		Stadium: Stadio Silvio Piola; Referee: Katalin Kulcsár (Hungary)

17 September 2014 2015 FIFA World Cup qualification	Romania	2–0	Estonia	Iaşi, Romania
16:00	Spânu 18', 38'	Report		Stadium: Stadionul Emil Alexandrescu; Referee: Aneliya Sinabova (Bulgaria)

=== 2015 ===
6 February 2015 Friendly	Estonia	2–0	Latvia	Tallinn, Estonia
14:30	Himanen 27'; Spruntule 50' (o.g.)	Report		Stadium: EJL Football Hall; Attendance: 86; Referee: Eiko Saar (Estonia)

20 May 2015 Friendly	Netherlands	7–0	Estonia	Rotterdam, Netherlands
19:00	Roord 13' van de Donk 14', 44' van Dongen 26' van de Sanden 48' (pen.); Jansen 8', 90+4'	Report		Stadium: Sparta Stadion; Attendance: 7,600; Referee: Lorraine Clark (Scotland)

28 August 2015 2015 Baltic Cup	Estonia	1–0	Latvia	Tallinn, Estonia
18:00	Loo 53'	Report		Stadium: TNTK Stadium; Attendance: 150; Referee: Jurgita Mačikunytė (Lithuania)

30 August 2015 2015 Baltic Cup	Lithuania	1–1	Estonia	Tallinn, Estonia
16:00	Mažukelytė 56'	Report	Loo 85'	Stadium: TNTK Stadium; Referee: Viola Raudzina (Latvia)

17 September 2015 UEFA Euro 2017 qualifying	Estonia	0–1	Serbia	Tartu, Estonia
19:00		Report	Mijatović 43'	Stadium: Tamme Stadium; Attendance: 647; Referee: Elia Martinez (Spain)

21 September 2015 UEFA Euro 2017 qualifying	Estonia	0–8	England	Tallinn, Estonia
19:00		Report	Carter 2', 83', 90+2'; Potter 34'; Kirby 40', 81'; Scott 53'; Christiansen 74'	Stadium: A. Le Coq Arena; Attendance: 1,342; Referee: Dilan Gökçek (Turkey)

13 October 2015 Friendly	Estonia	1–1	Malta	Tallinn, Estonia
19:00	Aarna 35'	Report	Carabott 51' (pen.)	Stadium: Sportland Arena; Attendance: 87; Referee: Esther Azzopardi (Malta)

15 October 2015 Friendly	Estonia	0–3	Malta	Tallinn, Estonia
19:00		Report	Martina Borg 14'; Brenda Borg 49'; Farrugia 69'	Stadium: Sportland Arena; Attendance: 67; Referee: Reelika Turi (Estonia)

23 October 2015 UEFA Euro 2017 qualifying	Bosnia and Herzegovina	4–0	Estonia	Zenica, Bosnia and Herzegovina
15:00	Nikolić 6', 43'; Melisa Hasanbegović 36'; Radeljić 73'	Report		Stadium: Bilino Polje Stadium; Attendance: 270; Referee: Tania Fernandes Morais (Luxembourg)

27 October 2015 UEFA Euro 2017 qualifying	Serbia	3–0	Estonia	Pećinci, Serbia
13:30	Čubrilo 17', 61'; Radojičić 82'	Report		Stadium: Bilino Polje Stadium; Attendance: 100; Referee: Justina Lavrenovaitė (Lithuania)

=== 2016 ===
11 March 2016 2016 Aphrodite Cup	Cyprus	1–0	Estonia	Parekklisia, Cyprus
12:00	Zampa 60'	Report		Stadium: Koinotiko Stadio Parekklisias; Referee: Michaela Fritz (Austria)

13 March 2016 2016 Aphrodite Cup	Estonia	0–2	Malta	Parekklisia, Cyprus
10:00		Report	Theuma 13'; Cuschieri 59'	Stadium: Koinotiko Stadio Parekklisias; Referee: Maria Marotta (Italy)

15 March 2016 2016 Aphrodite Cup	Israel	2–0	Estonia	Parekklisia, Cyprus
10:00	Falkon 33'; Schulmann 59'	Report		Stadium: Koinotiko Stadio Parekklisias; Referee: Sabina Bolić (Croatia)

16 March 2016 2016 Aphrodite Cup	Estonia	3–0	Lithuania	Limassol, Cyprus
10:30	Loo 22'; Tammik 68'; Aarna 83'	Report		Stadium: Auxiliary Parekklisia Stadium; Referee: Maria Marotta (Italy)

12 April 2016 UEFA Euro 2017 qualifying	Belgium	6–0	Estonia	Leuven, Belgium
20:00	Coutereels 11'; De Caigny 21', 50'; Wullaert 30', 63'; Schryvers 67'	Report		Stadium: Den Dreef; Attendance: 2,084; Referee: Melis Özçiğdem (Turkey)

3 June 2016 UEFA Euro 2017 qualifying	Estonia	0–5	Belgium	Tartu, Estonia
19:00		Report	Zlidnis 10' (o.g.); Zeler 38'; Van Gorp 60'; Cayman 65', 70'	Stadium: Tamme Stadium; Attendance: 322; Referee: Barbara Poxhofer (Germany)

6 June 2016 UEFA Euro 2017 qualifying	Estonia	0–1	Bosnia and Herzegovina	Tartu, Estonia
19:00		Report	Nikolić 57'	Stadium: Tamme Stadium; Attendance: 287; Referee: Cristina Mariana Trandafir (Romania)

4 August 2016 2016 Baltic Cup	Estonia	2–2	Faroe Islands	Riga, Latvia
14:00 (UTC+3)	Palmaru 10'; Lepik 45'	Report	Simonsen 75'; Andreasen 78'	Stadium: Iecava Stadium; Attendance: 50; Referee: Viola Raudziņa (Latvia)

5 August 2016 2016 Baltic Cup	Estonia	0–2	Latvia	Riga, Latvia
18:00 ((UTC+3))		Report	Fedotova 16' (pen.); Voitāne 33'	Stadium: Arkādija Stadium; Attendance: 150; Referee: Jurgita Mačikunytė (Lithuania)

7 August 2016 2016 Baltic Cup	Lithuania	1–1	Estonia	Riga, Latvia
15:00 (UTC+3)	Veličkaitė 71'	Report	Kubassova 53'	Stadium: Iecava Stadium; Attendance: 100; Referee: Viola Raudziņa (Latvia)

15 September 2016 UEFA Euro 2017 qualifying	England	5–0	Estonia	Nottingham, England
19:05 (UTC+1)	Carter 9', 17', 56'; Scott 13'; Carney 90+4' (pen.)	Report		Stadium: Meadow Lane; Attendance: 7,052; Referee: Vera Opeykina (Russia)

=== 2017 ===
11 March 2017 2017 Aphrodite Cup	Bahrain	0–3	Estonia	Parekklisia, Cyprus
10:30 (UTC+2)		Report	Saar 9'; Rosen 64'; Loo 90'	Stadium: Parekklisia Stadium; Referee: Demetra Charalambous (Cyprus)

13 March 2017 2017 Aphrodite Cup	Estonia	0–0	Lithuania	Parekklisia, Cyprus
11:00 (UTC+2)		Report		Stadium: Parekklisia Stadium; Referee: Orfeas Fella (Cyprus)

15 March 2017 2017 Aphrodite Cup	Latvia	0–0 (6–5 p)	Estonia	Parekklisia, Cyprus
15:00 (UTC+2)		Report		Stadium: Parekklisia Stadium; Referee: Uarios Christoforou (Cyprus)

6 April 2017 2019 FIFA World Cup qualification	Estonia	0–4	Latvia	Tbilisi, Georgia
14:00 (UTC+4)		Report	Fjodorova 37'; Spruntule 44'; Voitāne 62'; Ševcova 69'	Stadium: Mikheil Meskhi Stadium-2; Attendance: 100; Referee: Zuzana Kováčová (Slovakia)

8 April 2017 2019 FIFA World Cup qualification	Georgia	2–1	Estonia	Tbilisi, Georgia
16:00 (UTC+4)	Tchkonia 16'; Gabelia 22'	Report	Aarna 59'	Stadium: Mikheil Meskhi Stadium; Attendance: 200; Referee: Zuzana Kováčová (Slovakia)

11 April 2017 2019 FIFA World Cup qualification	Estonia	0–1	Kazakhstan	Tbilisi, Georgia
16:00 (UTC+4)		Report	Nikolayenko 62'	Stadium: Mikheil Meskhi Stadium-2; Attendance: 50; Referee: Eleni Lampadariou (Greece)

10 June 2017 Friendly	Belarus	1–1	Estonia	Minsk, Belarus
17:00 (UTC+3)	Beshten 41'	Report	Kubassova 49'	Stadium: Stadyen RTsOP-BGU; Attendance: 200; Referee: Olga Tereshko (Belarus)

4 August 2017 2017 Baltic Cup	Lithuania	0–0	Estonia	Šiauliai, Lithuania
18:00 (UTC+3)		Report		Stadium: Savivaldybė Stadium; Attendance: 200; Referee: Juste Lavrenovaite (Lithuania)

5 August 2017 2017 Baltic Cup	Estonia	0–3	Latvia	Šiauliai, Lithuania
15:00 (UTC+3)		Report	Fedotova 22'; Fjodorova 68'; Ševcova 87'	Stadium: Savivaldybė Stadium; Referee: Rasa Imanalijeva (Lithuania)

19 October 2017 Friendly	Poland	6–0	Estonia	Ostróda, Poland
11:00 (UTC+2)	Ratajczyk 9'; Lefeld 28'; Matuschewski 45' (pen.); Balcerzak 50', 78'; Kamczyk 85'	Report		Stadium: Municipal Stadium; Attendance: 2,186; Referee: Katarzyna Lisiecka-Sęk (Poland)

=== 2018 ===
5 February 2018 Friendly	Malta	0–1	Estonia	Ta' Qali, Malta
15:00 (UTC+1)		Report	Loo 80'	Stadium: Centenary Stadium; Attendance: 150; Referee: Tania Morais (Luxembourg)

8 February 2018 Friendly	Malta	4–1	Estonia	Ta' Qali, Malta
18:30 (UTC+1)	Zammit 17', 37'; Flask 30'; Farrugia 45'	Report	Tülp 62'	Stadium: Centenary Stadium; Attendance: 200; Referee: Tania Morais (Luxembourg)

4 April 2018 Friendly	Turkey	3–2	Estonia	Istanbul, Turkey
16:00 (UTC+3)	Karabulut 19'; Altunkulak 56', 88'	Report	Tammik 58'; Kubassova 69'	Stadium: TFF Riva Facility; Referee: Neslihan Muratdağı (Turkey)

7 April 2018 Friendly	Turkey	3–0	Estonia	Istanbul, Turkey
13:00 (UTC+3)	Topçu 51' (pen.); Altunkulak 55'; Korkmaz 73'	Report		Stadium: TFF Riva Facility; Referee: Alper Ulusoy (Turkey)

31 August 2018 2018 Baltic Cup	Estonia	0–0	Lithuania	Tallinn, Estonia
17:00 (UTC+3)		Report		Stadium: TNTK Stadium; Attendance: 188; Referee: Jeļena Jermolajeva (Latvia)

2 September 2018 2018 Baltic Cup	Latvia	2–0	Estonia	Tallinn, Estonia
16:00 (UTC+3)	Voitāne 48'; Miksone 69'	Report		Stadium: TNTK Stadium; Attendance: 177; Referee: Reelika Turi (Estonia)

4 October 2018 Friendly	Estonia	0–3	Poland	Tartu, Estonia
19:00 (UTC+3)		Report	Dereń 29'; Himanen 43' (o.g.); Cichosz 76'	Stadium: Tamme Stadium; Attendance: 167; Referee: Kristo Tohver (Estonia)

7 October 2018 Friendly	Luxembourg	0–4	Estonia	Wiltz, Luxembourg
19:00 (UTC+2)		Report	Kubassova 52'; Loo 65', 67' (pen.); Saulep 86'	Stadium: Terrain Poetz-Weidingen; Attendance: 150; Referee: Angelika Söder (Germany)

8 November 2018 Friendly	Hungary	4–0	Estonia	Telki, Hungary
20:00 (UTC+1)	Szabó 10'; Vágó 17', 32'; Mosdóczi 57' (pen.)	Report		Stadium: Globall Football Park; Attendance: 70; Referee: Karoline Wacker (Germany)

=== 2019 ===
27 February 2019 2019 Aphrodite Cup	Estonia	0–0	Malta	Parekklisia, Cyprus
10:00 (UTC+2)		Report		Stadium: Auxiliary Parekklisia Stadium; Attendance: 10; Referee: Ioanna Allayiotou (Cyprus)

28 February 2019 2019 Aphrodite Cup	Lithuania	0–1	Estonia	Parekklisia, Cyprus
10:00 (UTC+2)		Report	Bannikova 45'	Stadium: Auxiliary Parekklisia Stadium; Attendance: 4 Referee: Loukas Sotiriou (Cyprus)

2 March 2019 2019 Aphrodite Cup	Cyprus	1–0	Estonia	Parekklisia, Cyprus
12:15 (UTC+2)	Violari 39'	Report		Stadium: Parekklisia Community Stadium; Attendance: 50; Referee: Ioanna Allayiotou (Cyprus)

3 April 2019 Friendly	Azerbaijan	0–1	Estonia	Baku, Azerbaijan
16:30 (UTC+4)		Report	Merisalu 2'	Stadium: Dalga Arena; Attendance: 100; Referee: Rahim Hasanov (Azerbaijan)

6 April 2019 Friendly	Azerbaijan	0–0	Estonia	Baku, Azerbaijan
12:00 (UTC+4)		Report		Stadium: Dalga Arena; Attendance: 100; Referee: Aliyar Aghayev (Azerbaijan)

14 June 2019 2019 Baltic Cup	Latvia	3–0	Estonia	Riga, Latvia
18:00 (UTC+3)	Miksone 56'; Voitāne 76'; Zaičikova 79'	Report		Stadium: Arkādija Stadium; Attendance: 150; Referee: Rasa Imanalijeva (Lithuania)

15 June 2019 2019 Baltic Cup	Estonia	0–2	Lithuania	Baldone, Latvia
14:00 (UTC+3)		Report	Žižytė 78'; Mažukėlytė 89'	Stadium: Baldone Stadium; Attendance: 22; Referee: Jeļena Jermolajeva (Latvia)

18 June 2019 Friendly	Estonia	0–1	Belarus	Tallinn, Estonia
17:30 (UTC+3)		Report	Linnik 42'	Stadium: Kadriorg Stadium; Attendance: 213; Referee: Jeļena Jermolajeva (Latvia)

30 August 2019 UEFA Euro 2021 qualifying	Estonia	0–7	Netherlands	Tallinn, Estonia
19:00 (UTC+3)		Report	Miedema 27', 69'; Roord 31'; Spitse 40', 51'; Bloodworth 81'; E. Jansen 85'	Stadium: A. Le Coq Arena; Attendance: 1,881; Referee: Olga Zadinová (Czech Republic)

3 September 2019 UEFA Euro 2021 qualifying	Russia	4–0	Estonia	Moscow, Russia
19:00 (UTC+3)	Korovkina 10', 57'; Fedorova 29'; Myagkova 82'	Report		Stadium: Sapsan Arena; Referee: Katalin Sipos (Hungary)

4 October 2019 UEFA Euro 2021 qualifying	Turkey	0–0	Estonia	Istanbul, Turkey
16:00 (UTC+3)		Report		Stadium: Sancaktepe Stadium; Referee: Marta Frías (Spain)

8 October 2019 UEFA Euro 2021 qualifying	Estonia	1–2	Kosovo	Tartu, Estonia
19:15 (UTC+3)	Loo 22' (pen.)	Report	Uka 41', 56'	Stadium: Tamme Stadium; Attendance: 377; Referee: Iuliana Demetrescu (Romania)

7 November 2019 Friendly	Belarus	2–0	Estonia	Minsk, Belarus
17:00 (UTC+3)	Shcherbachenia 12'; Linnik 40' (pen.)	Report		Stadium: Krytyj futbolnyj Manesh; Attendance: 100; Referee: Olga Tereshko (Belarus)

10 November 2019 Friendly	Belarus	0–0	Estonia	Minsk, Belarus
15:00 (UTC+3)		Report		Stadium: Krytyj futbolnyj Manesh; Attendance: 75; Referee: Vitaliy Onikhimovskiy (Belarus)

=== 2020 ===
6 March 2020 Friendly	Wales	2–0	Estonia	Wrexham, Wales
19:00 (UTC±0)	Wynne 69'; Lawrence 76'	Report		Stadium: Racecourse Ground; Attendance: 2,015; Referee: Lorraine Watson (Scotland)

9 March 2020 Friendly	Faroe Islands	1–1	Estonia	Tórshavn, Faroe Islands
17:00 (UTC±0)	Andreasen 88'	Report	Bannikova 61'	Stadium: Tórsvøllur; Referee: Alex Troleis (Faroe Islands)

12 August 2020 UEFA Euro 2021 qualifying	Estonia	1–0	Latvia	Tallinn, Estonia
17:00 (UTC+3)	Bannikova 53'	Report		Stadium: A. Le Coq Arena; Attendance: 573; Referee: Reelika Turi (Estonia)

18 September UEFA Women's Euro 2022 qualifying	Kosovo	2–0	Estonia	Pristina, Kosovo
19:00 (UTC+2)	Himanen 7' (o.g.); Biqkaj 28'	Report (EJL)		Stadium: Fadil Vokrri Stadium; Attendance: 0 Referee: Olivia Tschon (Austria)

22 September UEFA Women's Euro 2022 qualifying	Estonia	0–3	Russia	Jūrmala, Latvia
16:00 (UTC+3)		Report (EJL)	Yakovleva 22'; Mashina 76'; Korovkina 90+4'	Stadium: Sloka Stadium; Attendance: 0 Referee: Simona Ghisletta (Switzerland)

23 October UEFA Women's Euro 2022 qualifying	Netherlands	7–0	Estonia	Groningen, Netherlands
19:30 (UTC+2)	Van de Donk 7', 16'; Groenen 26', 65'; Spitse 38' (pen.); Nouwen 76'; Snoeijs 83'	Report (EJL)		Stadium: Euroborg; Referee: Tess Olofsson (Sweden)

27 November UEFA Women's Euro 2022 qualifying	Estonia	0–4	Turkey	Tallinn, Estonia
17:00 (18:00 EET)		Report (UEFA)	Türkoğlu 29'; Civelek 55'; Hız 76'; Uraz 81'	Stadium: Sportland Arena; Referee: Volha Tsiareshka (Belarus)

1 December 2020 UEFA Women's Euro 2022 qualifying	Slovenia	2–0	Estonia	Koper, Slovenia
18:00	Kralj 27'; Kork 59' (o.g.)	Report (UEFA)		Stadium: Bonifika Stadium; Referee: Maria Marotta (Italy)

=== 2021 ===
23 February 2021 UEFA Women's Euro 2022 qualifying	Estonia	0–9	Slovenia	Lilleküla Stadium, Tallinn
17:00 (18:00 EET)		Report (UEFA)	Čonč 31'; Zver 44', 54'; Milovič 60'; Prašnikar 68' (pen.), 81'; Klopčič 70'; Vindišar 74', 77'	Attendance: 0 Referee: Eszter Urbán (Hungary)

10 June 2021 2021 Baltic Women's Cup Semi-finals	Estonia	1–1 (4–5 p)	Faroe Islands	Alytus, Lithuania
	Kubassova 55'	Report (SW)	Johannesen 41'	Stadium: Alytus Stadium
	Penalties
	Himanen (penalty scored); Aarna (penalty missed); Laas (penalty scored); Rosen (penalty scored); Raadik (penalty scored); Daut (penalty missed)		Sevdal (penalty scored); Johannesen (penalty scored); Torolvsdottir (penalty missed); Johannesen (penalty scored); Lamhauge (penalty scored); Olsen (penalty scored)

13 June 2021 2021 Baltic Women's Cup 3rd	Estonia	4–1	Latvia	Jonava, Lithuania
14:00 UTC+3	Tammik 16'; Brant 28'; Himanen 43'; Lillemäe 45+3'	Report (SW)	Fedotova 90+5'	Stadium: Central Stadium of Jonava

17 September 2023 FIFA Women's World Cup qualification– UEFAGroup I	Estonia	0–4	Slovenia	Pärnu, Estonia
18:00 (19:00 EEST)		Report	Prašnikar 21', 48'; Golob 31'; Agrež 54'	Stadium: Pärnu Rannastaadion; Referee: Hristiyana Guteva (Bulgaria)

21 September 2023 FIFA Women's World Cup qualification– UEFAGroup I	Estonia	0–1	Wales	Pärnu
19:00 (20:00 EEST)		Report	Harding 5'	Stadium: Pärnu Rannastaadion; Referee: Kateryna Monzul (Ukraine)

22 October 2023 FIFA Women's World Cup qualification– UEFAGroup I	France	11–0	Estonia	Créteil
	Geyoro 5'; Katoto 15'; Périsset 25' (pen.); Cascarino 29'; Toletti 45'; Orav 52' (o.g.); Diani 53'; Tounkara 65', 72'; Saar 79' (o.g.); Dali 90'	Report		Stadium: Stade Dominique Duvauchelle; Referee: Abigail Marriott (England)

26 October 2023 FIFA Women's World Cup qualification– UEFAGroup I	Wales	4–0	Estonia	Cardiff
20:15 (19:15 BST)	James 27'; Ward 48'; Harding 54'; Ingle 90+3'	Report		Stadium: Cardiff City Stadium; Referee: Marta Frias Acedo (Spain)

26 November 2023 FIFA Women's World Cup qualification– UEFAGroup I	Slovenia	6–0	Estonia	Nova Gorica
	Prašnikar 9', 38'; Korošec 33'; Kolbl 73'; Raadik 79' (o.g.); Kuštrin 89'	Report		Stadium: Nova Gorica Sports Park; Referee: Minka Vekkeli (Finland)

=== 2022 ===
8 April 2022 2023 FIFA Women's World Cup qualification	Estonia	1–3	Greece	Tallinn, Estonia
19:00 (UTC+3)	Himanen 63'	Report	Kongouli 14', 21'; Sarri 76'	Stadium: Lilleküla Stadium; Attendance: 435; Referee: Lucie Šulcová (Czech Republic)

12 April 2022 2023 FIFA Women's World Cup qualification	Greece	3–0	Estonia	Patras, Greece
20:00 (UTC+3)	Sarri 19'; Kongouli 48'; Pouliou 74'	Report		Stadium: Pampeloponnisiako Stadium; Referee: Simona Ghisletta (Switzerland)

28 June 2022 2023 FIFA Women's World Cup qualification	Estonia	4–2	Kazakhstan	Pärnu, Estonia
19:00 (UTC+3)	Saar 61', 88'; Himanen 71'; Tammik 90+5'	Report	Turlybekova 37'; Bortnikova 52'	Stadium: Pärnu Rannastaadion; Attendance: 267; Referee: Silvia Gasperotti (Italy)

2 September 2022 2023 FIFA Women's World Cup qualification	Estonia	0–9	France	Tallinn, Estonia
18:00 (UTC+3)		Report	Cascarino 6'; Dali 17' (pen.); Sarr 24', 29', 45', 47'; Matéo 59' (pen.), 67'; Geyoro 83'	Stadium: Lilleküla Stadium; Attendance: 862; Referee: Silvia Domingos (Portugal)

6 September 2022 2023 FIFA Women's World Cup qualification	Kazakhstan	0–2	Estonia	Karagandy, Kazakhstan
19:00 (UTC+6)		Report	Demidova 8' (o.g.); Saar 17'	Stadium: Shakhter Stadium; Referee: Liudmyla Telbukh (Ukraine)

6 October 2022 2022 Baltic Women's Cup Semi final	Estonia	4–1	Lithuania	Tartu, Estonia
19:00 (UTC+3)	Tammik 12'; Bannikova 28'; Kubassova 72', 75'	Report	Partikaitė 86'	Stadium: Tamme Stadium; Attendance: 222; Referee: Viola Raudziņa (Latvia)

9 October 2022 2022 Baltic Women's Cup Final	Faroe Islands	1–3	Estonia	Tartu, Estonia
19:00 (UTC+3)	Kiss-Zlidnis 52' (o.g.)	Report	Tammik 19'; Kubassova 61'; Merisalu 77'	Stadium: Tamme Stadium; Attendance: 164; Referee: Sarah Fatemeh Zangeneh (Norway)

10 November 2022 Friendly	Montenegro	1–1	Estonia	Bar, Montenegro
13:00 (UTC+1)	Popović 53'	Report	Lillemäe 16'	Stadium: Stadion Topolica; Attendance: 200; Referee: Merima Čelik (Bosnia and Herzegovina)

14 November 2022 Friendly	Montenegro	1–2	Estonia	Bar, Montenegro
13:00 (UTC+1)	Dešić 10'	Report	Bannikova 16'; Maraš 70' (o.g.)	Stadium: Stadion Topolica; Attendance: 100; Referee: Merima Čelik (Bosnia and Herzegovina)

=== 2023 ===
15 February 2023 2023 Turkish Women's Cup	Estonia	1–2	Kosovo	Alanya, Turkey
18:30 (UTC+3)	Kubassova 12'	Report	Ejupi 33'; Memeti 69'	Stadium: Goldcity Sport Complex; Referee: Farida Lutfaliyeva (Azerbaijan)

21 February 2023 2023 Turkish Women's Cup	Estonia	1–1	North Macedonia	Alanya, Turkey
15:00 (UTC+3)	Tammik 21'	Report	Andonova 66'	Stadium: Goldcity Sport Complex; Referee: Farida Lutfaliyeva (Azerbaijan)

7 April 2023 Friendly	Estonia	1–2	Malta	Tallinn, Estonia
19:00 (UTC+3)	Merisalu 88'	Report	Bugeja 73'; Farrugia 89'	Stadium: Sportland Arena; Attendance: 302; Referee: Lina Lehtovaara (Finland)

11 April 2023 Friendly	Estonia	0–1	Ukraine	Tallinn, Estonia
19:00 (UTC+3)		Report	Ovdiychuk 45'	Stadium: Sportland Arena; Attendance: 349; Referee: Monika Mularczyk (Poland)

14 July 2023 Friendly	Estonia	0–3	Turkey	Tallinn, Estonia
19:00 (UTC+3)		Report	Topçu 11'; Esen 48'; Şeker 52'	Stadium: Kadriorg Stadium; Attendance: 273; Referee: Lizzy van der Helm (Netherlands)

17 July 2023 Friendly	Estonia	2–2	Turkey	Tallinn, Estonia
19:00 (UTC+3)	Tammik 45'; Kirpu 87'	Report	Türkoğlu 32'; Şeker 38'	Stadium: Kadriorg Stadium; Attendance: 322; Referee: Justina Lavrenovaitė-Perez (Lithuania)

22 September 2023 Nations League C	Estonia	0–0	Kazakhstan	Tartu, Estonia
17:00 (18:00 EEST)		Report		Stadium: Tamme Stadium; Attendance: 334; Referee: Caroline Lanssens (Belgium)

26 September 2023 Nations League C	Estonia	0–5	Israel	Tartu, Estonia
18:00 (19:00 EEST)		Report	Sharabi 7'; Shtainshnaider 17'; Selimhodzic 60'; Kats 75'; Beck 90+2'	Stadium: Tamme Stadium; Referee: Lisa Benn (England)

27 October 2023 Nations League C	Armenia	1–4	Estonia	Yerevan, Armenia
17:30 (19:30 AMT)	Ghukasyan 70'	Report	Tammik 25', 48', 60'; Treiberg 64'	Stadium: Vazgen Sargsyan Republican Stadium; Attendance: 120; Referee: Lotta Vuorio (Finland)

31 October 2023 Nations League C	Estonia	5–1	Armenia	Tallinn, Estonia
17:00 (18:00 EET)	Tammik 8', 90+2'; Treiberg 23', 38'; Himanen 76'	Report	Pizlova 56'	Stadium: Lilleküla Stadium; Attendance: 342; Referee: Elena Gobjila (Moldova)

1 December 2023 Nations League C	Kazakhstan	0–1	Estonia	Astana
15:00 (20:00 ALMT)		Report	Bannikova 6'	Stadium: Astana Arena; Referee: Kirsty Dowle (England)

5 December 2023 Nations League C	Israel	4–1	Estonia	Telki (Hungary) (Note: Due to the Gaza war, Israel were required to play their home matches at neutral venues.)
16:00	Beck 3', 47', 55'; Elinav 39'	Report	Tammik 80'	Stadium: Globall Football Park; Referee: Maïka Vanderstichel (France)

=== 2024 ===
21 February 2024 Turkish Women's Cup	India	4–3	Estonia	Alanya, Turkey
11:00	Manisha 17', 81'; Indumathi 62'; Xaxa 79'		Tammik 32'; Kubassova 88'; Lillemäe 90'	Stadium: Gold City Sport Complex; Referee: Melis Özçiğdem (Turkey)

24 February 2024 Turkish Women's Cup	Kosovo	3–0	Estonia	Alanya, Turkey
11:00	Uka 14'; Ejupi 29'; Metaj 32'			Stadium: Gold City Sport Complex

27 February 2024 Turkish Women's Cup	Estonia	1–0	Hong Kong	Alanya, Turkey
15:30	Kala 72'	Report		Stadium: Gold City Sport Complex; Referee: Kala 72'

9 April UEFA Women's Euro 2025 qualifying	Albania	2–0	Estonia	Tirana
--:-- UTC+0	F. Berisha 31'; Maksuti 90+3'	Report		Stadium: Arena Kombëtare; Referee: Anastasiya Romanyuk (Ukraine)

31 May UEFA Women's Euro 2025 qualifying	Estonia	1–2	Albania	Tallinn
17:00 (18:00 UTC+3)	Himanen 17'	Report	F. Berisha 7'; Krasniqi 90+2'	Stadium: Lilleküla Stadium; Attendance: 934; Referee: Tatyana Sorokopudova (Kazakhstan)

12 July UEFA Women's Euro 2025 qualifying	Luxembourg	1–1	Estonia	Esch-sur-Alzette, Luxembourg
--:-- UTC+0	Miller 48'	Report	Tammik 53'	Stadium: Stade Emile Mayrisch; Attendance: 587; Referee: Tjaša Misja (Slovenia)

16 July UEFA Women's Euro 2025 qualifying	Estonia	1–1	Luxembourg	Tartu
19:00 (20:00 UTC+3)	Teern 49'	Report	Thompson 18'	Stadium: Tamme Stadium

29 November Friendly	Kosovo	8–0	Estonia	Pristina, Kosovo
14:00 UTC+2	Biqkaj 6'; Memeti 15', 32', 50'; Fetaj 41'; Uka 68', 71', 82' (pen.)	Report		Stadium: Fadil Vokrri Stadium; Referee: Florian Lata (Albania)

2 December Friendly	Kosovo	1–2	Estonia	Pristina, Kosovo
14:00 UTC+2	Halilaj 90+1' (pen.)	Report	Kubassova 23'; Teern 35'	Stadium: Fadil Vokrri Stadium; Referee: Florian Lata (Albania)

=== 2025 ===
20 February 2025 Turkish Women's Cup	Puerto Rico	1–0	Estonia	Antalya, Turkey
8:30 AST	Douglas 61'	Report		Attendance: 30; Referee: Asen Albayrak (Turkey)

25 February 2025 UEFA Nations League C	Israel	3–1	Estonia	Győr, Hungary
14:30 CET	Selimhodzic 35'; Beard 48'; Kuznetzov 80'	Report	Kirpu 78'	Stadium: Alcufer Stadion; Attendance: 0 Referee: Briet Bragadottir (Iceland)

4 April 2025 UEFA Nations League C	Estonia	0–0	Bulgaria	Tallinn, Estonia
18:00 UTC+2		Report		Stadium: Lilleküla Stadium; Attendance: 457; Referee: Stacey Pearson (England)

30 May 2025 UEFA Nations League C	Estonia	0–3	Israel	Tallinn
17:00		Report	Selimhodzic 39'; Cohen 75'; Ben Israel 90+5'	Stadium: Kadriorg Stadium; Attendance: 583; Referee: Charlotte Carpenter (Wales)

3 June 2025 UEFA Nations League C	Bulgaria	0–1	Estonia	Sofia
19:00		Report	Teern 90+1'	Stadium: Stadion Aleksandar Shalamanov; Attendance: 470; Referee: Ioanna Allayiotou (Cyprus)

24 October 2025 Baltic Cup SF	Estonia	0–1	Latvia	Raudondvaris, Lithuania
13:00		Report	Miksone 17'	Stadium: Raudondvaris Stadium; Attendance: 40; Referee: Jurgita Mačikunytė (Lithuania)

27 October 2025 Women's Baltic Cup	Estonia	2–0	Faroe Islands	Raudondvaris, Lithuania
11:00	Treiberg 26'; Palts 38'			Stadium: Raudondvaris Stadium

29 November Friendly	Estonia	0–2	Lithuania	Tallinn, Estonia
15:30		Report	14' Jonušaitė; 77' Lazdauskaitė	Stadium: Sportland Arena; Referee: Jelena Jermolajeva

=== 2026 ===
3 March 2027 FIFA Women's World Cup qualification	Bosnia and Herzegovina	3–1	Estonia	FF BH Football Training Centre, Zenica
13:00	Milinković 36'; Šabanagić 45+3'; Grebenar 88'	Report	Räämet 41' (pen.)	Attendance: 100; Referee: Karoline Marie Jensen (Norway)

7 March 2027 FIFA Women's World Cup qualification	Lithuania	0–0	Estonia	Raudondvario stadionas, Raudondvaris
16:00		Report		Attendance: 587; Referee: Marina Živković (Serbia)

10 April Unofficial Friendly	Czechia U23 (Czech Republic)	4–0	Estonia
	Jelinkova 03'; Tenkratova 08'; Hlavacova 33'; Hola 87'	Report

14 April 2027 FIFA Women's World Cup qualification	Estonia	2–1	Liechtenstein	Lilleküla Stadium, Tallinn
17:00	Kubassova 44' (pen.); Kirpu 84'	Report (FIFA); Report (UEFA)	Steck 50'	Attendance: 502; Referee: Rita Vehapi (Kosovo)

18 April 2027 FIFA Women's World Cup qualification	Estonia	2–1	Lithuania	Lilleküla Stadium, Tallinn
16:00	Lillemäe 42'; Tammik 90+3'	Report	Švarcaitė 30'	Attendance: 487; Referee: Asen Albayrak (Turkey)

5 June 2027 FIFA Women's World Cup qualification	Liechtenstein	0–5	Estonia	Rheinpark Stadion, Vaduz
19:00		Report (FIFA); Report (UEFA)	Kubassova 6'; Kirpu 29'; Tammik 50'; Merisalu 60'; Teern 83'	Attendance: 695; Referee: Araksya Saribekyan (Armenia)

9 June 2027 FIFA Women's World Cup qualification	Estonia	1–1	Bosnia and Herzegovina	Pärnu Rannastaadion, Pärnu
	Kubassova 10'	Report (FIFA); Report (UEFA)	Hasanbegović 23'	Referee: Michaela Pachtová (Czech Republic)

== See also ==
- List of Estonia women's international footballers
