= List of Estonia women's international footballers =

This is a complete list of Estonia women's international footballers – women's association football players who have played for the Estonia women's national football team.

== Players ==
Caps and goals updated as of 7 October 2018, after the match against Luxembourg.

Name	Career	Caps	Goals
Signy Aarna	2007–	77	26
Anželika Ahmetšina	2007–2008	11	3
Kristina Bannikova	2013–	54	3
Berle Brant	2008–	14	0
Grete Daut	2018–	2	0
Anastasia Dodeltseva	2018–	1	0
Inna Dubrovina	1998–2003	13	1
Liis Emajõe	2008–2014	33	2
Riin Emajõe	2012–2015	23	0
Maria Filatova	1999–2006	34	0
Silja Goroško	2017–	2	0
Evelin Harjakas	2003	2	0
Kristi Hausenberg	2008	2	0
Kätlin Hein	2003–2009	11	0
Kairi Himanen	2009–	41	1
Ragne Hindrimäe	2016	5	0
Tiina Hodakov	1996–1998	12	1
Imbi Hoop	2010–2016	20	0
Marika Ilves	1995–2005	12	0
Gerli Israel	2018–	5	0
Hannaliis Jaadla	2005–2015	66	2
Kaidi Jekimova	2000–2014	68	9
Kristina Jerohova-Reinoltsas	2000–2002	5	0
Ethel Jäärats	1995–1998	13	0
Katrin Kaarna	2003–2007	4	0
Anett Kadastu	2018–	1	0
Kristi Kais	1995	1	0
Kaire Kaljurand	1994–2000	24	1
Merli Kaljuve	2003	2	0
Miina Kallas	2012–2016	31	1
Kady Kalvet	1994–1995	3	0
Andra Karpin	1994–2006	38	4
Marina Karžetskaja	2000–2006	14	0
Kärt Kaseorg	2010	5	0
Karina Kesvatera	2014	2	1
Kadri Kimsen	1994–2000	10	0
Kaire Kimsen	1996–2002	17	0
Irja Koikson	1994–2005	26	1
Marlen Kori	2000–2002	7	1
Karina Kork	2017–	1	0
Teele Koršakov	2003	3	0
Vlada Kubassova	2013–	33	5
Eneli Kutter	2008–	58	2
Kerttu Kuusik	1997–1999	8	1
Grete-Lilijane Küppas	2012–2015	11	0
Getter Laar	2007–	50	0
Sigrit Laas	1995–1996	8	0
Daniela Mona Lambin	2011–2017	34	1
Maarika Leets	2001–2003	8	0
Aire Lepik	1994–1998	10	1
Liis Lepik	2015–2017	20	1
Mari Liis Lillemäe	2017–	6	0
Liisa Lilleste	2004–2007	15	2
Katrin Loo	2007–	93	19
Saron Läänmäe	2012–2015	7	0
Aljona Malets	2006–2014	15	1
Margarita Matjuhhova	2006–2013	33	5
Elis Meetua	1995–2011	63	0
Maarija Mikiver	2008	2	0
Merlyn Mletsin	2000–2002	12	1
Anastassia Morkovkina	1997–2015	75	40
Maris Mäes	2002	1	0
Tiina Mändla	1997–1999	2	0
Moonika Mürk	2002	2	0
Ariina Mürkhain	2017–	4	0
Signe Müürsoo	1994–2000	14	0
Gerlin Naisson	1994–2006	27	0
Rano Normatova	1996–2004	3	0
Grete Ojala	2011	1	0
Maaren Olander	1994–1998	17	0
Maria Orav	2018–	2	0
Pirjo Orn	2007–2008	5	0
Gina Paalo	1997–1998	4	0
Ave Pajo	2000–2010	40	19
Annika Pajupuu	2013	2	0
Kaire Palmaru	2001–2016	104	10
Jekaterina Paškevitš	2002	3	0
Anete Paulus	2008–2017	46	1
Liis Pello	2007–	31	1
Ingrid Pihela	1999–2003	9	1
Kadri Pihl	1995	1	0
Geit Prants	2000–2011	28	0
Karina Puks	2006	2	0
Kristlin Põbo	1994	1	0
Pille Raadik	2007–	65	0
Marje Rannu	1995–1998	18	0
Helen Ree	1994–1996	7	0
Sirje Roops	2014–2016	15	0
Kelly Rosen	2014–	32	1
Elizaveta Rutkovskaja	2017–	8	0
Siret Räämet	2017–	8	0
Getter Saar	2018–	1	0
Heleri Saar	1996–2011	63	0
Ketlin Saar	2015–	29	1
Liis Saharov	2003–2006	12	0
Eneli Sarv	2008	5	0
Aljona Sasova	2004–2016	51	1
Maarja Saulep	2017–	5	1
Annika Sillaots	2004–2006	4	0
Saskia Sonnberg	2010–	14	0
Maria Sootak	2014	1	0
Annaliis Strigin	2015	2	0
Getriin Strigin	2016–	15	0
Liivi Sõrmus	2011–	13	1
Aleksandra Ševoldajeva	2010	1	0
Inna Zlidnis	2007–	70	0
Annika Tammela	1994–2000	27	1
Lisette Tammik	2015–	28	2
Krista Teinveld	1994	1	0
Annika Tikk	2002–2004	13	1
Merily Toom	2012–2017	36	1
Tiina Trutsi	2012–2015	20	0
Olga Tšuiko	2005–2008	16	1
Varje Tugim	1994–2008	29	0
Katrin Tuse	1997–2002	12	1
Katrin Tuulik	2000	1	0
Ulrika Tülp	2010–	14	1
Rutt Urbsalu	2000	2	0
Samanta Uueda	2018–	1	0
Anna Vaher	1998–2005	11	0
Reelika Vaher	1994–2006	47	9
Monika Vehlmann	2000–2007	19	0
Ingela Viks	2003	3	0
Liisi Vink-Lainas	2016–	4	0
Maarja Vinkel	2000	2	0
Anett Vilipuu	2013–2016	5	1
Maarja Virula	2014	1	0
Triin Väljataga	2007	1	1
Kethy Õunpuu	2005–	88	3

- Reports for matches played against Latvia on 25 September 1998 and on 15 July 2000, and Lithuania on 26 September 1998 and on 16 July 2000 are incomplete.

== See also ==
- Estonia women's national football team results
- List of Estonia international footballers
