= Olga Ševcova =

Latvian footballer

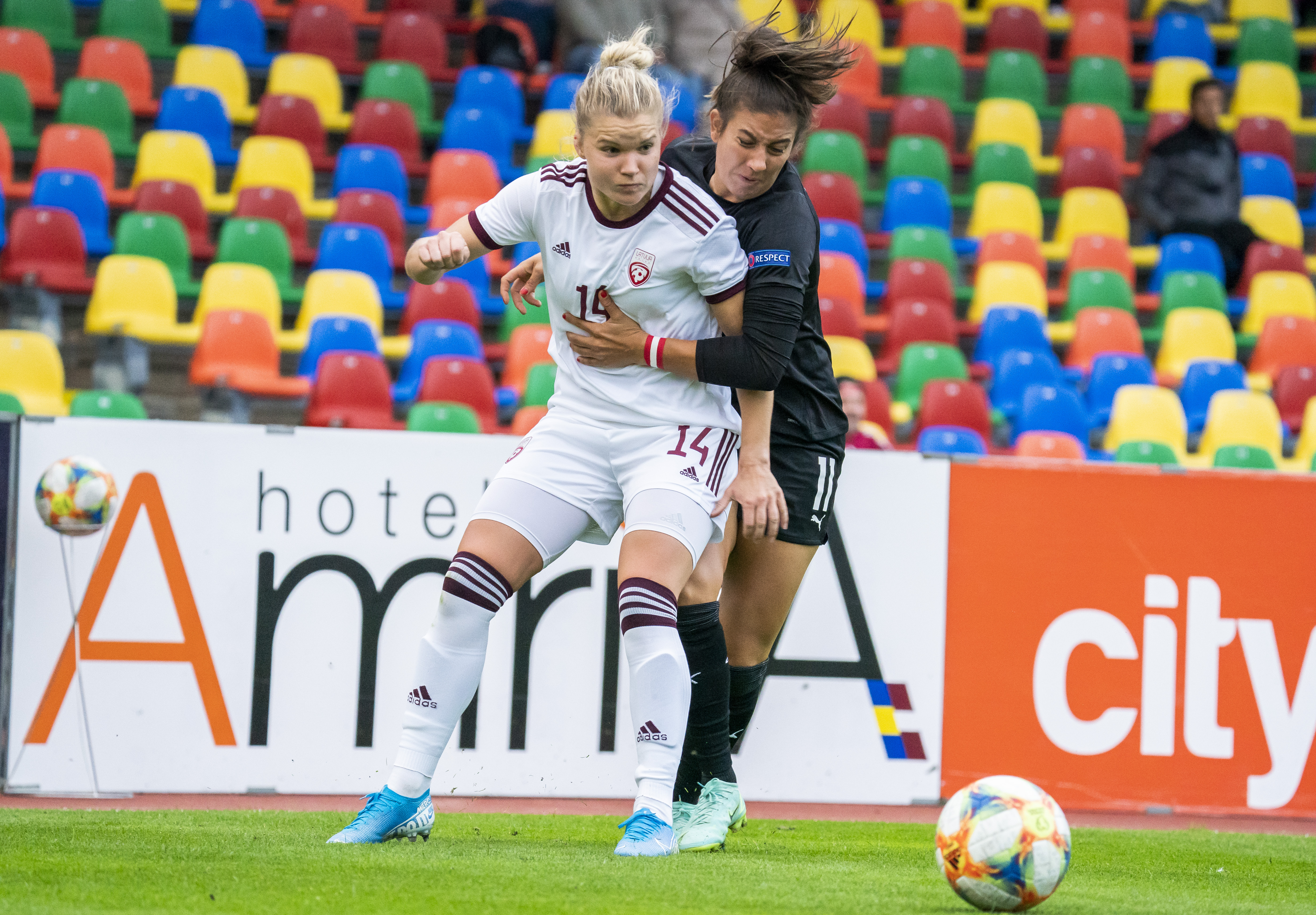

Personal information
- Birth name: Olga Ivanova
- Date of birth: 26 November 1992 (age 33)
- Place of birth: Riga, Latvia
- Position: Forward

Team information
- Current team: Fenerbahçe S.K.
- Number: 15

Youth career
- JFC Skonto
- 2004–2006: Šitika FS

Senior career*
Years	Team	Apps	(Gls)
2007–2009	FC Skonto/Cerība-46.vsk.		
2009	Gintra Universitetas		
2010–2014	Pärnu JK	18	(5)
2016–2018	Rīgas FS		
2019	FK Dinamo Rīga		
2020–	ÍBV	69	(20)
2023-2024	→ Fenerbahçe S.K.	0	(0)

International career^{‡}
2007–2008	Latvia U17	6	(2)
2008–2010	Latvia U19	9	(0)
2011–	Latvia	74	(15)
- * Club domestic league appearances and goals as of 17 July 2024 (UTC) ‡ National team caps and goals as of 19:01 8 April 2025 (UTC)

Olga Ševcova (née Ivanova; born 26 November 1992) is a Latvian footballer who plays as a forward for ÍBV of the Úrvalsdeild kvenna and the Latvia women's national team. She has been named the Latvian Footballer of the Year on six occasions. Ševcova has played for clubs based in Lithuania, Estonia and Iceland, as well as in her native Latvia.

== Club career ==
Ševcova's first club was JFC Skonto, where she played in the boys' youth teams under veteran coach Vladimirs Beļajevs. She joined Šitika Futbola skola in 2004, then moved on to FC Skonto/Cerība-46.vsk. where she played from 2007 until 2009.

Moving abroad, Ševcova then joined Lithuanian Women's A League champions Gintra Universitetas Šiauliai and participated in the club's 2009–10 UEFA Women's Champions League qualifying round campaign. From 2010 until 2014 Ševcova spent five seasons playing for Pärnu JK of the Estonian Naiste Meistriliiga.

In 2011 Ševcova was named Latvian Footballer of the Year for the first time, after five goals in 18 league games for Meistriliiga champions Pärnu and one against Peamount United in a 2011–12 UEFA Women's Champions League qualifying round defeat. She won the Latvian Footballer of the Year award for a second time in 2013.

Ševcova did not play in the 2015 season, as she was pregnant. Following the birth of her child, she returned to Latvian Women's League football with Rīgas FS in 2016. After helping Rīgas FS to a "double" in 2017, Ševcova was named Latvian Footballer of the Year for a third time. Continued good form saw her retain the award in 2018 and 2019. In 2019 she was one of several players to depart the dominant Rīgas FS club for newly-formed FK Dinamo Rīga, who then captured the Latvian Women's League title.

In January 2020 Ševcova transferred to the Icelandic Úrvalsdeild kvenna club ÍBV, along with her compatriots Elīza Spruntule and Karlīna Miksone. After a promising 2020 season in which she scored three goals in 16 appearances, Ševcova agreed a new one-year contract with ÍBV. In 2021 Ševcova was voted ÍBV's Player of the Year after she scored six goals in 16 appearances. She extended her contract again in December 2021.

In November 2023 Ševcova was transferred to the Turkish Women's Football Super League club Fenerbahçe S.K. Ševcova's transfer was one of the most notable moves in the history of Latvian women's football.

== International career ==
Ševcova has been capped for the Latvia women's national football team. She made her debut on 3 March 2011, in a 2–0 UEFA Women's Euro 2013 qualifying preliminary round defeat by Luxembourg in Strumica. (Note: This is the first match listed of Ševcova's appearances at the Latvian Football Federation website. But the 'Biogrāfija' page on the same profile says her debut came in a 3–1 Women's Baltic Cup defeat by Estonia on 25 April 2009.) She appeared for the team during the 2019 FIFA Women's World Cup qualifying cycle.

Ševcova became historic as the first ever Latvia women's national team player to score against Sweden or any top 10 ranked national team in the UEFA Women's Euro 2022 qualifying match played on 3 September 2019. (Note: Euro 2022 qualifying dispensed with the preliminary round, in which Latvia had been eliminated since their return to international play for UEFA Women's Euro 2009 qualifying. This meant that Latvia faced some much higher ranked opponents than before.) Latvia was ranked 93 by FIFA and 43 by UEFA (fifth last of all who entered) at the time, in contrast to Sweden's sixth place.

Occasionally Ševcova has been unavailable for national team fixtures due to what the Latvian Football Federation (LFF) has described as: "ģimenes apstākļu" (English: family circumstances), including in the return fixture with Sweden. For the same reason, she was one of several regular national team players who were unable to participate in the November 2021 FIFA Women's World Cup qualification match against England, in which a depleted Latvia team suffered a record 20–0 defeat.

=== Statistics ===
Appearances and goals by national team and year
National team	Year	Apps	Goals
Latvia
Latvia	2011	1	0
Latvia	2012	—	
Latvia	2013	3	0
Latvia	2014	—	
Latvia	2015	—	
Latvia	2016	3	0
Latvia	2017	9	3
Latvia	2018	8	1
Latvia	2019	8	2
Latvia	2020	2	0
Latvia	2021	6	1
Latvia	2022	8	2
Total		48	9

As of match played 6 October 2022

=== International goals ===
Scores and results list Latvia's goal tally first, score column indicates score after each Ševcova goal.

List of international goals scored by Olga Ševcova
No.	Date	Venue	Opponent	Score	Result	Competition
1	11 March 2017	Tsirio Stadium, Limassol, Cyprus	Malta	1–0	1–0	2017 Aphrodite Women Cup
2	6 April 2017	Mikheil Meskhi Stadium, Tbilisi, Georgia	Estonia	4–0	4–0	2019 FIFA World Cup qual.
3	8 May 2017	Savivaldybė Stadium, Šiauliai, Lithuania	Estonia	3–0	3–0	2017 Women's Baltic Cup
4	1 September 2018	TNTK Stadium, Tallinn, Estonia	Lithuania	3–0	4–0	2018 Women's Baltic Cup
5	16 June 2019	Jāņa Skredeļa Stadium, Riga, Latvia	Lithuania	2–0	2–0	2019 Women's Baltic Cup
6	3 September 2019	Daugava Stadium, Liepāja, Latvia	Sweden	1–0	1–4	2022 UEFA Women's Championship qual.
7	21 October 2021	Daugava Stadium, Liepāja, Latvia	North Macedonia	1–2	1–4	2023 FIFA World Cup qual.
8	1 September 2022	Petar Miloševski Training Centre, Skopje, North Macedonia	North Macedonia	2–3	2–3	2023 FIFA World Cup qual.
9	6 October 2022	Võru Sports Center Stadium, Võru, Estonia	Faroe Islands	2–1	2–3	2022 Baltic Women's Cup

== Style of play ==
An adaptable attacking player, Ševcova is capable of playing in most forward positions on the pitch.

== Honours ==
=== Club ===
Skonto/Cerība

- Latvian Women's League: 2008, 2009

Gintra-Universitetas Šiauliai

- Lithuanian Women's A League: 2009
- Lithuanian Women's Cup: 2009

Pärnu JK

- Naiste Meistriliiga: 2010, 2011, 2012, 2013, 2014
- Estonian Women's Cup: 2010, 2011, 2012, 2014

Rīgas FS

- Latvian Women's League: 2016, 2017, 2018
- Latvian Women's Cup: 2016, 2017, 2018

Dinamo Rīga

- Latvian Women's League: 2019

=== International ===
Latvia

- Baltic Cup: 2017, 2018, 2019
- Aphrodite Women Cup: 2017

=== Individual ===
- Latvian Footballer of the Year: 2011, 2013, 2017, 2018, 2019, 2022
