= Sõrmus =

Family name

Sõrmus (meaning a finger ring) is an Estonian surname that may refer to the following notable people:

- Eduard Sõrmus (1878–1940), Estonian violinist
- Liivi Sõrmus (born 1992), Estonian football midfielder
