= 2022 Baltic Women's Cup =

Association football tournament

Tournament details
- Host country: Estonia
- City: Tartu / Võru
- Dates: 6–9 October
- Teams: 4 (from 1 confederation)
- Venue: 2 (in 2 host cities)

Final positions
- Champions: Estonia (11th title)
- Runners-up: Faroe Islands
- Third place: Lithuania
- Fourth place: Latvia

Tournament statistics
- Matches played: 4
- Goals scored: 17 (4.25 per match)
- Attendance: 410 (103 per match)
- Top scorer(s): (Estonia) Vlada Kubassova (3 goals)

The 2022 Women's Baltic Cup was the 22nd edition of the Women's Baltic Cup, an international women's football tournament contested by the Baltic States. The tournament was hosted by Estonia from 6 to 9 October 2022.

Defending champions Lithuania who won 2021 Baltic Women's Cup as hosts, were eliminated in the semi-finals (first round) by Estonia, despite finishing third after beating Latvia in 3rd place play-off match.

Hosts Estonia secured a place in the final, having last won the tournament in 2014. Estonia clinched the title by beating Faroe Islands 3–1 in the final, held at Tamme Stadium in Tartu.

== Participating nations ==
All Baltic States plus the Faroe Islands entered the tournament.

Country	Appearance	Previous best performance	FIFA ranking 5 August 2022
Lithuania	22nd	Champions (1996, 1998, 2007, 2015, 2021)	95
Faroe Islands	3rd	Champions (2016)	100
Estonia (Host)	22nd	Champions (2003, 2004, 2005, 2006, 2008, 2009, 2010, 2012, 2013, 2014)	106
Latvia	22nd	Champions (1997, 2011, 2017, 2018, 2019)	112

== Venues ==
Matches will be held in two venues.

Võru	Tartu	2022 Baltic Women's Cup (Estonia)
Võru Sports Center Stadium	Tamme Stadium	2022 Baltic Women's Cup (Estonia)
Capacity: 2,500	Capacity: 1,638	2022 Baltic Women's Cup (Estonia)

== Match officials ==
the selected match officials for this tournament.

=== Referees ===
- (Estonia) Juri Frischer
- (Estonia) Reelika Turi
- (Latvia) Viola Raudzina
- (Norway) Sarah Fatemeh Zangeneh

=== Assistant referees ===
- (Denmark) Sidsel Dall
- (Estonia) Sander Saga
- (Estonia) Neeme Neemlaid
- (Estonia) Silver Kõiv
- (Estonia) Karolin Kaivoja
- (Latvia) Diana Vanaga-Araja
- (Latvia) Marita Vitola
- (Norway) Line Cathrine Nymoen

== Knockout stage ==
Semi-finals
6 October – Võru
Latvia	2
Faroe Islands	3
6 October – Tartu
Estonia	4
Lithuania	1

Final
9 October – Tartu
Faroe Islands	1
Estonia	3
Third Place
9 October – Võru
Latvia	1
Lithuania	2

=== Semi-finals ===
6 October 2022
13:00

Latvia	2–3	Faroe Islands
Fedotova 54'; Ševcova 59'	Report	Sevdal 4'; Jacobsen 64'; Johannesen 86'

Võru Sports Center Stadium, Võru
Attendance: 17
Referee: Juri Frischer (Estonia)
6 October 2022
19:00

Estonia	4–1	Lithuania
Tammik 12'; Bannikova 28'; Kubassova 72', 75'	Report	Partikaitė 86'

Tamme Stadium, Tartu
Attendance: 222
Referee: Viola Raudzina (Latvia)

=== Third place match ===
9 October 2022
13:00

Latvia	1–2	Lithuania
Poluhovica 84'	Report	Lazdauskaitė 24', 54'

Võru Sports Center Stadium, Võru
Attendance: 7
Referee: Reelika Turi (Estonia)

=== Final ===
9 October 2022
19:00

Faroe Islands	1–3	Estonia
Zlidnis 55' (o.g.)	Report	Tammik 19'; Kubassova 60'; Merisalu 77'

Tamme Stadium, Tartu
Attendance: 164
Referee: Sarah Fatemeh Zangeneh (Norway)

== Goalscorers ==
There were 13 goals scored in 3 matches, for an average of 4.33 goals per match.

3 goals

- (Estonia) Vlada Kubassova

2 goals

- (Estonia) Lisette Tammik
- (Lithuania) Ugnė Lazdauskaitė

1 goal

- (Estonia) Kristina Bannikova
- (Estonia) Liisa Merisalu
- (Faroe Islands) Heidi Sevdal
- (Faroe Islands) Rúna Jacobsen
- (Faroe Islands) Ásla Johannesen
- (Latvia) Anastasija Poluhovica
- (Latvia) Renāte Fedotova
- (Latvia) Olga Ševcova
- (Lithuania) Eitvydė Partikaitė

1 own goal

- (Estonia) Inna Zlidnis

== Awards ==
2022 Baltic Women's Cup
(Estonia)
Estonia
Eleventh title

== Final ranking ==
Pos	Team	Pld	W	D	L	GF	GA	GD	Pts	Final result
1	Estonia (H)	2	2	0	0	7	2	+5	6	Champions
2	Faroe Islands	2	1	0	1	4	5	−1	3	Runners-up
3	Lithuania	2	1	0	1	3	5	−2	3	Third place
4	Latvia	2	0	0	2	3	5	−2	0	Fourth place

Source: EJL
(H) Hosts
