= Signy Aarna =

Estonian footballer (born 1990)

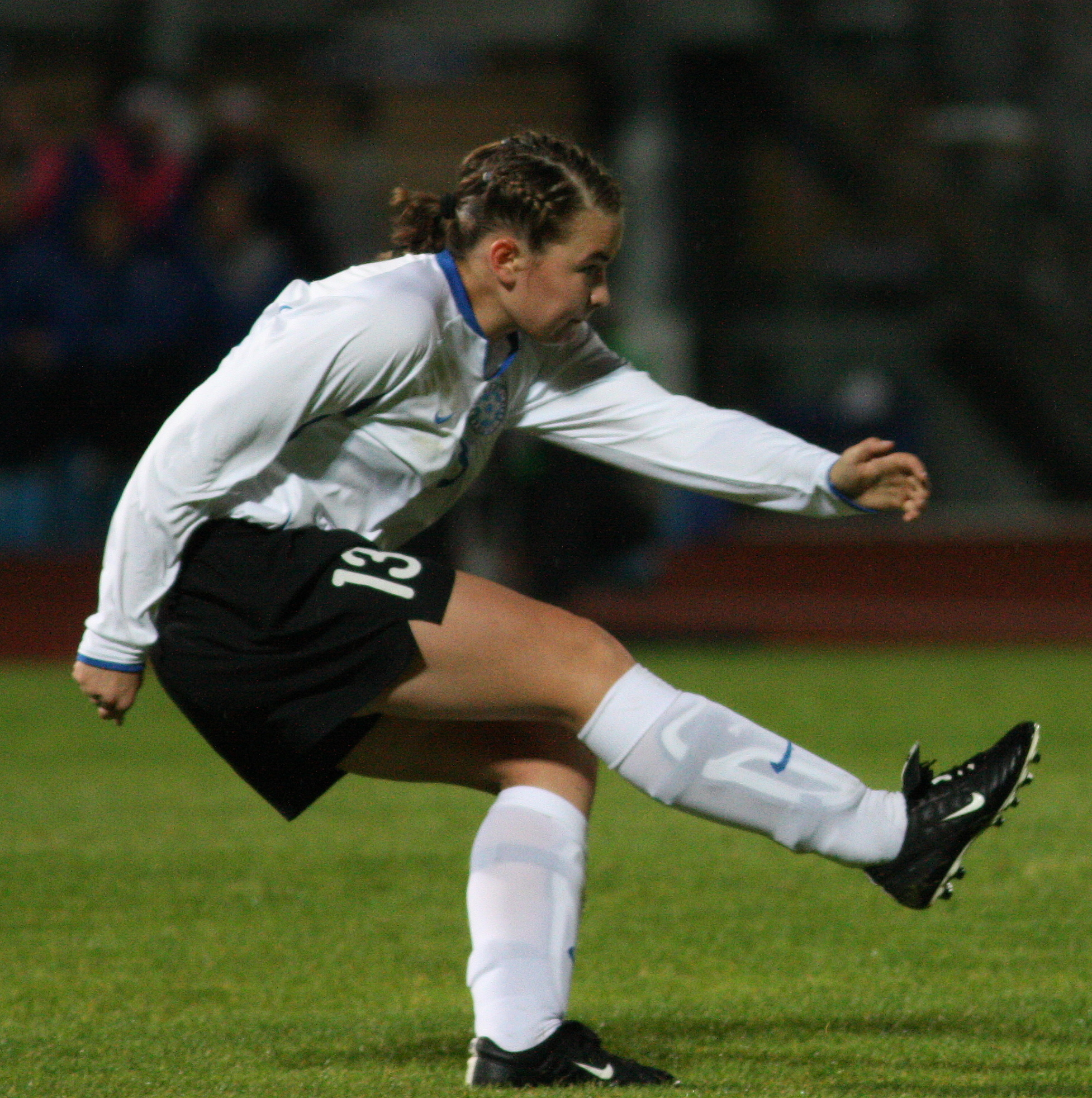
- Playing for Estonia in 2009

Personal information
- Full name: Signy Aarna
- Date of birth: 4 October 1990 (age 36)
- Place of birth: Ahja, Põlva County, Estonia
- Height: 1.68 m (5 ft 6 in)
- Position: Forward

Team information
- Current team: Åland United
- Number: 7

Youth career
- 2002: Ahja Sipelgas
- 2003–2008: Põlva FC Lootos

Senior career*
Years	Team	Apps	(Gls)
2008–2013	Põlva FC Lootos	111	(153)
2014–2017	Pallokissat	90	(45)
2018–	Åland United	44	(10)

International career^{‡}
2005	Estonia U16	2	(0)
2006–2008	Estonia U19	17	(1)
2009–	Estonia Universiade Team	12	(3)
2009–	Estonia	101	(26)
- * Club domestic league appearances and goals as of 22 November 2019 ‡ National team caps and goals as of 8 April 2022

Signy Aarna (born 4 October 1990) is an Estonian footballer who plays as a forward for Finnish club Åland United and for the Estonia national team. She previously played for Finnish club Pallokissat and FC Lootos of the Estonian Naiste Meistriliiga.

== Club career ==
From Ahja, Põlva County, Aarna started training with the youth team of FC Lootos as a goalkeeper in 2003. In 2005, 2007 and 2008 she won Estonian youth titles with the club's different age groups.

=== FC Lootos ===
In 2008, she started in FC Lootos' senior squad in the Esiliiga, the second level of women's football in Estonia. FC Lootos won the league and Aarna was the top scorer with 48 goals. From 2009 she played for FC Lootos in the top level Naiste Meistriliiga. She remains the club's most capped player with 121 games in all competitions and 166 goals in Estonian league and cup games.

=== Pallokissat ===
Despite offers from other Meistriliiga clubs, Aarna opted to stay with her hometown club until leaving the country. After the end of season 2013, Aarna signed her first professional contract with Naisten Liiga club Pallokissat in Finland. In her debut season Aarna scored 13 goals in 21 matches, she became the club's top scorer and helped the team to reach third place and the first ever medals in the club's history. 2015 proved to be another productive season for Aarna, as she scored 17 goals in Naisten Liiga and she became again the club's top scorer.

=== Åland United ===
Before the 2018 season, Aarna joined Åland United.

== International career ==
Aarna debuted for the senior national team in the 2009 Baltic Cup, starting her first game on 24 April 2009 against Latvia and scoring Estonia's fifth and final goal on her home ground, Lootospark. She previously played at Under-17 and under-19 levels. On 26 November 2021, she played her 100th match for Estonia during the 2023 FIFA Women's World Cup qualification.

== Career statistics ==
Scores and results list Estonia's Women's National team first

Goals scored in official competitions

Competition	Stage	Date	Location	Opponent	Goals	Result	Overall
2011 FIFA World Cup	Qualifiers	2010–03–27	Vrbovec	Croatia	1	3–0	1
2013 UEFA Euro	Qualifiers	2011–09–18	Tallinn	Ukraine	1	1–4	2
2013 UEFA Euro	Qualifiers	2012–06–16	Otepää	Belarus	1	2–4	2
2015 FIFA World Cup	Qualifiers	2014–08–20	Tallinn	Czech Republic	1	1–4	1
2019 FIFA World Cup	Qualifiers	2017–04–08	Tbilisi	Georgia	1	2–1	1

Complete list of games

#	Date	Venue	Opponent	Result	Competition	Scored
1	2 November 2007	Savivaldybė Stadium, Šiauliai	Latvia	3–2	UEFA Minitournament	
2	24 April 2009	Lootospark, Põlva	Latvia	5–0	2009 Baltic Cup	1
3	26 April 2009	Lootospark, Põlva	Lithuania	1–0	2009 Baltic Cup	
4	12 May 2009	Armenia, Yerevan	Armenia	3–0	UEFA Minitournament	1
5	14 May 2009	Armenia, Yerevan	Kazakhstan	2–1	UEFA Minitournament	
6	17 September 2009	Laugardalsvollur, Reykjavík	Iceland	0–12	2011 FIFA World Cup Qual.	
7	28 October 2009	Jules Deschaseaux stadium, Le Havre	France	0–12	2011 FIFA World Cup Qual.	
8	27 March 2010	Vrbovec stadium, Vrbovec	Croatia	3–0	2011 FIFA World Cup Qual.	2
9	31 March 2010	Mirko Vucurevic, Banatski Dvor	Serbia	0–4	2011 FIFA World Cup Qual.	
10	15 May 2010	Savivaldybė Stadium, Šiauliai	Latvia	7–1	2010 Baltic Tournament	4
11	16 May 2010	Savivaldybė Stadium, Šiauliai	Lithuania	3–1	2010 Baltic Tournament	1
12	5 June 2010	Kadriorg, Tallinn	Northern Ireland	2–1	2011 FIFA World Cup Qual.	
13	19 June 2010	Linnastaadion, Rakvere	Serbia	1–0	2011 FIFA World Cup Qual.	
14	23 June 2010	Kadriorg, Tallinn	France	0–6	2011 FIFA World Cup Qual.	
15	24 July 2010	The Showgrounds, Coleraine	Northern Ireland	0–3	2011 FIFA World Cup Qual.	
16	22 August 2010	A Le Coq Arena, Tallinn	Croatia	1–1	2011 FIFA World Cup Qual.	
17	13 February 2011	Olympic Sportas Centrs, Riga	Latvia	5–1	Friendly	2
18	13 May 2011	LFF trening centrs, Staicele	Latvia	0–2	2011 Baltic Tournament	
19	14 May 2011	LFF trening centrs, Staicele	Lithuania	3–0	2011 Baltic Tournament	
20	25 August 2011	Molodechno City stadium, Molodechno	Belarus	1–2	Euro 2013 Qual.	
21	18 September 2011	A Le Coq Arena, Tallinn	Ukraine	1–4	Euro 2013 Qual.	1
22	22 October 2011	ISS stadium, Vantaa	Finland	0–6	Euro 2013 Qual.	
23	25 October 2011	Nirodné tréningové centrum SFZ staadion, Senec	Slovakia	1–3	Euro 2013 Qual.	
24	5 April 2012	SK Sevastopol stadion, Sevastopol	Ukraine	0–5	Euro 2013 Qual.	
25	8 June 2012	Tamme stadium, Tartu	Lithuania	3–0	2012 Baltic Tournament	1
26	10 June 2012	Tamme stadium, Tartu	Latvia	6–0	2012 Baltic Tournament	
27	16 June 2012	Tehvandi stadium, Otepää	Belarus	2–4	Euro 2013 Qual.	1
28	25 August 2012	Haapsalu staadion, Haapsalu	Slovakia	0–2	Euro 2013 Qual.	
29	15 September 2012	A Le Coq Arena, Tallinn	Finland	0–5	Euro 2013 Qual.	
30	9 November 2012	Centenary Stadium, Malta	Malta	0–2	Friendly	
31	11 November 2012	Centenary Stadium, Malta	Malta	0–2	Friendly	
32	20 March 2013	Terrain, "An de Buerwiesen" Stadium, Mertzig	Luxembourg	1–1	Friendly	
33	3 March 2013	Olympic Sportas Centrs, Riga	Latvia	5–3	Friendly	1
34	24 August 2013	LFF Stadium, Vilnius	Latvia	0–0	2013 Baltic Tournament	
35	25 August 2013	LFF Stadium, Vilnius	Lithuania	4–0	2013 Baltic Tournament	1
36	10 September 2013	Haapsalu staadion, Haapsalu	Wales	2–3	Friendly	2
37	20 September 2013	A Le Coq Arena, Tallinn	Italy	1–5	2015 FIFA World Cup Qual.	
38	27 October 2013	Ciudad Deportiva de Collado Villalba, Madrid	Spain	0–6	2015 FIFA World Cup Qual.	
39	30 October 2013	Mladost stadium, Strumica	North Macedonia	2–0	2015 FIFA World Cup Qual.	
40	1 March 2014	EJL Jalgpallihall, Tallinn	Latvia	8–2	Friendly	3
41	3 March 2014	Newforge Lane, Belfast	Northern Ireland	0–1	Friendly	
42	5 March 2014	Clandeboye Park, Bangor	Northern Ireland	0–1	Friendly	
43	26 March 2014	Opava stadium, Opava	Czech Republic	0–6	2015 FIFA World Cup Qual.	
44	8 May 2014	A Le Coq Arena, Tallinn	Spain	0–5	2015 FIFA World Cup Qual.	
45	15 June 2014	Haapsalu staadion, Haapsalu	North Macedonia	1–1	2015 FIFA World Cup Qual.	
46	19 June 2014	Haapsalu staadion, Haapsalu	Romania	0–2	2015 FIFA World Cup Qual.	
47	16 July 2014	Pruszków, Pruszków	Poland	1–5	Friendly	1
48	20 August 2014	A Le Coq Arena, Tallinn	Czech Republic	1–4	2015 FIFA World Cup Qual.	1
49	13 September 2014	Stadio Silvio Piola, Vercelli	Italy	0–4	2015 FIFA World Cup Qual.	
50	20 May 2015	Sparta Stadion, Rotterdam	Netherlands	0–7	Friendly	
51	17 September 2015	Tamme Stadium, Tartu	Serbia	0–1	Euro 2017 qualifying	
52	21 September 2015	A Le Coq Arena, Tallinn	England	0–8	Euro 2017 qualifying	
53	13 October 2015	Sportland Arena, Tallinn	Malta	1–1	Friendly	1
54	15 October 2015	Sportland Arena, Tallinn	Malta	0–3	Friendly	
55	23 October 2015	Bilino Polje Stadium, Zenica	Bosnia and Herzegovina	0–4	Euro 2017 qualifying	
56	27 October 2015	Bilino Polje Stadium, Pećinci	Serbia	0–3	Euro 2017 qualifying	
57	11 March 2016	Koinotiko Stadio Parekklisias, Parekklisia	Cyprus	0–1	2016 Aphrodite Cup	
58	13 March 2016	Koinotiko Stadio Parekklisias, Parekklisia	Malta	0–2	2016 Aphrodite Cup	
59	15 March 2016	Koinotiko Stadio Parekklisias, Parekklisia	Israel	0–2	2016 Aphrodite Cup	
60	16 March 2016	Auxiliary Parekklisia Stadium, Limassol	Lithuania	3–0	2016 Aphrodite Cup	1
61	12 April 2016	Den Dreef, Leuven	Belgium	0–6	Euro 2017 qualifying	
62	3 June 2016	Tamme Stadium, Tartu	Belgium	0–5	Euro 2017 qualifying	
63	6 June 2016	Tamme Stadium, Tartu	Bosnia and Herzegovina	0–1	Euro 2017 qualifying	
64	15 September 2016	Meadow Lane, Nottingham	England	0–5	Euro 2017 qualifying	
65	6 April 2017	Mikheil Meskhi Stadium-2, Tbilisi	Latvia	0–4	2019 WWCQ	
66	8 April 2017	Mikheil Meskhi Stadium, Tbilisi	Georgia	2–1	2019 WWCQ	1
67	11 April 2017	Mikheil Meskhi Stadium-2, Tbilisi	Kazakhstan	0–1	2019 WWCQ	
68	10 June 2017	Stadyen RTsOP-BGU Minsk	Belarus	1–1	Friendly	
69	4 August 2017	Savivaldybė Stadium, Šiauliai	Lithuania	0–0	2017 Baltic Tournament	
70	19 October 2017	Municipal Stadium, Ostróda	Poland	0–6	Friendly	

=== Club ===
Season	Club	Country	Level	Apps	Goals
2021	Åland United	Finland	I	14	1
2020	Åland United	Finland	I	17	3
2019	Åland United	Finland	I	21	1
2018	Åland United	Finland	I	23	9
2017	Pallokissat	Finland	I	23	5
2016	Pallokissat	Finland	I	23	10
2015	Pallokissat	Finland	I	23	17
2014	Pallokissat	Finland	I	21	13
2013	Põlva FC Lootos	Estonia	I	17	30
2012	Põlva FC Lootos	Estonia	I	17	28
2011	Põlva FC Lootos	Estonia	I	20	22
2010	Põlva FC Lootos	Estonia	I	20	14
2009	Põlva FC Lootos	Estonia	I	20	11
2008	Põlva FC Lootos	Estonia	II	17	48

== Personal life ==
Aarna attended Ahja Keskkool. In 2009, she moved to University of Tartu to study sports development with coaching.

== Awards ==
In 2010 Aarna was awarded Female Meistriliiga Footballer of the Season. In 2011 and 2015 Female Footballer of the Year.
