= Liisa Rebane =

Estonian footballer

Personal information
- Date of birth: 15 January 2002 (age 24)
- Place of birth: Estonia
- Position: Forward

Senior career*
Years	Team	Apps	(Gls)
2019	Pallokissat		
2020	Nummelan Palloseura		
2022	Helsingin Palloseura		
2023	Tammeka		
2024-2025	Thy-Thisted	9	(0)
2025-	Viimsi JK	3	(4)

International career^{‡}
2017–2018	Estonia U-17	18	(4)
2019	Estonia U-19	5	(0)
2019–	Estonia	51	(4)
- * Club domestic league appearances and goals as of 14 April 2026 ‡ National team caps and goals as of 9 June 2026

Liisa Rebane (née Merisalu; born 15 January 2002) is an Estonian footballer who plays as a forward for the Estonia women's national team.

== Career ==
She made her debut for the Estonia national team on 28 February 2019 against Lithuania, coming on as a substitute for Kristina Bannikova. As of May 2020, she was playing football in Finland for Nummelan Palloseura.

On 7 April 2023, she scored a goal against Malta in Tallinn at a friendly match.

== International goals ==
Scores and results list Estonia's goal tally first.

No.	Date	Venue	Opponent	Score	Result	Competition
1.	3 April 2019	Dalga Arena, Baku, Azerbaijan	Azerbaijan	1–0	1–0	Friendly
2.	9 October 2022	Tamme Stadium, Tartu, Estonia	Faroe Islands	1–0	1–0	2022 Baltic Women's Cup
3.	7 April 2023	Sportland Arena, Tallinn, Estonia	Malta	1–2	1–2	Friendly
4.	5 June 2026	Rheinpark Stadion, Vaduz, Liechtenstein	Liechtenstein	3–0	5–0	2027 FIFA Women's World Cup qualification
