= Vlada Kubassova =

Estonian footballer (born 1995)

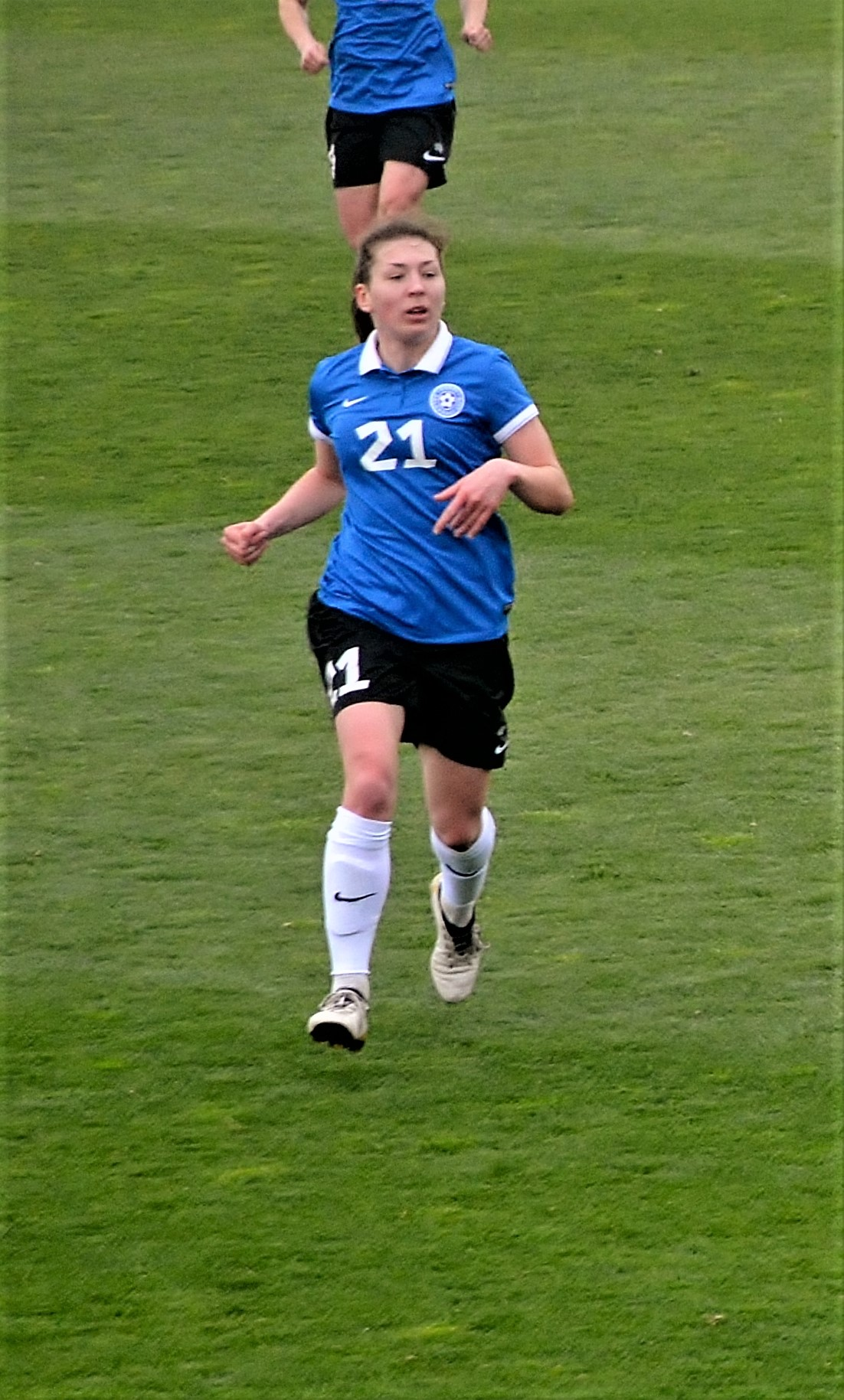
- Kubassova representing Estonia in 2018.

Personal information
- Date of birth: 23 August 1995 (age 31)
- Place of birth: Tallinn, Estonia
- Height: 1.68 m (5 ft 6 in)
- Position: Forward

Team information
- Current team: Ferencváros
- Number: 58

Youth career
- Levadia Tallinn

Senior career*
| Years | Team | Apps | (Gls) |
| 2011–2018 | Levadia Tallinn | 131 | (131) |
| 2018–2021 | Napoli | 47 | (16) |
| 2021–2023 | Como | 42 | (8) |
| 2023 | Flora Tallinn | 4 | (2) |
| 2024– | Ferencváros | 25 | (15) |

International career^{‡}
| 2013– | Estonia | 87 | (17) |
- * Club domestic league appearances and goals as of 13 September 2025 ‡ National team caps and goals as of 9 June 2026

Vlada Kubassova (born 23 August 1995) is an Estonian professional footballer who plays as a forward for Hungarian club Ferencváros and the Estonia women's national team. She previously played professionally in Italy, for Napoli and Como.

She was voted Estonian Female Footballer of the Year in 2022 and 2024.

== International goals ==
| No. | Date | Venue | Opponent | Score | Result | Competition |
|---|---|---|---|---|---|---|
| 1. | 7 June 2014 | Savivaldybė Stadium, Šiauliai, Lithuania | Latvia | 4–0 | 4–0 | 2014 Baltic Cup |
| 2. | 7 August 2016 | Iecava Stadium, Riga, Latvia | Lithuania | 1–0 | 1–1 | 2016 Baltic Cup |
| 3. | 10 June 2017 | Stayden RTsOP-BGU, Minsk, Belarus | Belarus | 1–1 | 1–1 | Friendly |
| 4. | 4 April 2018 | TFF Riva Facility, Istanbul, Turkey | Turkey | 2–2 | 2–3 | Friendly |
| 5. | 7 October 2018 | Terreinz Poetz-Weidingen, Wiltz, Luxembourg | Luxembourg | 1–0 | 4–0 | Friendly |
| 6. | 10 June 2021 | Alytus Stadium, Alytus, Lithuania | Faroe Islands | 1–1 | 1–1 (4–5 p) | 2021 Baltic Cup |
| 7. | 6 October 2022 | Tamme Stadium, Tartu, Estonia | Lithuania | 3–0 | 4–1 | 2022 Baltic Cup |
| 8. | 6 October 2022 | Tamme Stadium, Tartu, Estonia | Lithuania | 4–0 | 4–1 | 2022 Baltic Cup |
| 9. | 9 October 2022 | Tamme Stadium, Tartu, Estonia | Faroe Islands | 2–1 | 3–1 | 2022 Baltic Cup |
| 10. | 15 February 2023 | Gold City Sports Complex, Alanya, Turkey | Kosovo | 1–0 | 1–2 | 2023 Turkish Women's Cup |
| 11. | 21 February 2024 | Gold City Sports Complex, Alanya, Turkey | India | 2–4 | 3–4 | 2024 Turkish Women's Cup |
| 12. | 2 December 2024 | Fadil Vokrri Stadium, Pristina, Kosovo | Kosovo | 1–0 | 2–1 | Friendly |
| 13. | 14 April 2026 | Lilleküla Stadium, Tallinn, Estonia | Liechtenstein | 1–0 | 2–1 | 2027 FIFA Women's World Cup qualification |
| 14. | 5 June 2026 | Rheinpark Stadion, Vaduz, Liechtenstein | Liechtenstein | 1–0 | 5–0 | 2027 FIFA Women's World Cup qualification |
| 15. | 9 June 2026 | Pärnu Rannastaadion, Pärnu, Estonia | Bosnia and Herzegovina | 1–0 | 1–1 | 2027 FIFA Women's World Cup qualification |
