= Varje Tugim =

Estonian footballer

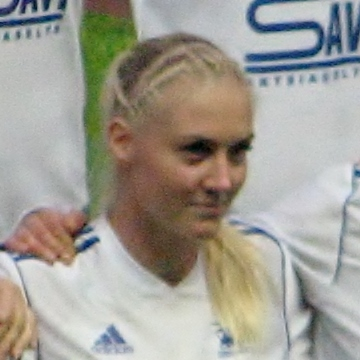

Personal information
- Date of birth: 28 July 1978 (age 48)
- Place of birth: Pärnu, then part of Estonian SSR, Soviet Union
- Position: Midfielder

International career^{‡}
Years	Team	Apps	(Gls)
1994–2008	Estonia	29	(0)
- ‡ National team caps and goals as of 16:44, 2 March 2021 (UTC)

Varje Tugim (born 28 July 1978) is an Estonian former footballer who played as a midfielder for the Estonia women's national team.

== Career ==
Tugim was a substitute in the first ever official match for Estonia, against Lithuania. She represented Estonia on 29 occasions.

== Personal life ==
In 2012, she graduated from the University of Tartu.
