= Renāte Fedotova =

Latvian footballer

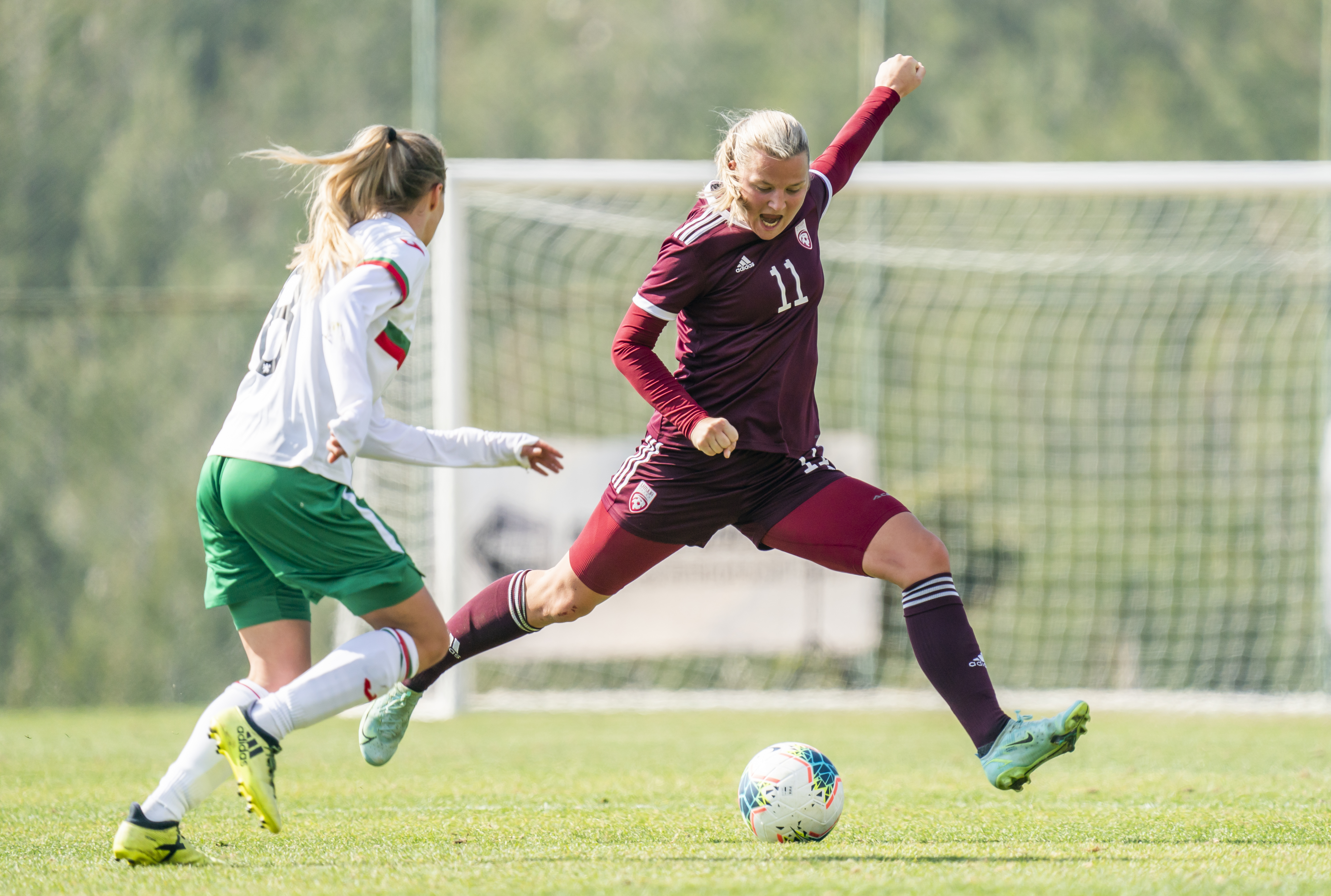

Personal information
- Full name: Renāte Fedotova
- Date of birth: 12 December 1996 (age 29)
- Place of birth: Latvia
- Position: Striker

Team information
- Current team: Without club

Senior career*
Years	Team	Apps	(Gls)
2013	FK Liepājas Metalurgs		
2014–2018	Rīgas FS		
2018–2019	Dinamo Riga 2005		
2020	SK Supernova Olaine		
2021	FC Wacker Innsbruck		
2021	Pink Bari CF		
2022	FK Saned		

International career^{‡}
2011–2012	Latvia U17	7	(5)
2013–2014	Latvia U19	6	(1)
2013–	Latvia	49	(16)
- * Club domestic league appearances and goals as of 19:23, 19 July 2023 (UTC) ‡ National team caps and goals as of 19:23, 19 July 2023 (UTC)

Renāte Fedotova (born 12 December 1996) is a Latvian football striker, who is currently without a club.

== International goals ==
No.	Date	Venue	Opponent	Score	Result	Competition
1.	4 April 2015	CSR Orhei, Orhei, Moldova	Luxembourg	2–1	3–4	UEFA Women's Euro 2017 qualifying preliminary round
2.	5 August 2016	Jānis Skredelis' stadium, Riga, Latvia	Estonia	1–0	2–0	2016 Baltic Women's Cup
3.	8 April 2017	Mikheil Meskhi Stadium, Tbilisi, Georgia	Kazakhstan	2–0	2–2	2019 FIFA Women's World Cup qualification preliminary round
4.	13 June 2021	Central Stadium of Jonava, Jonava, Lithuania	Estonia	1–4	1–4	2021 Baltic Women's Cup
5.	9 April 2022	Stade Jos Haupert, Niederkorn, Luxembourg	Luxembourg	1–0	2–3	2023 FIFA Women's World Cup qualification
6.	9 April 2022	Stade Jos Haupert, Niederkorn, Luxembourg	Luxembourg	2–0	2–3	2023 FIFA Women's World Cup qualification
7.	6 October 2022	Võru Sports Center Stadium, Võru, Estonia	Faroe Islands	1–1	2–3	2022 Baltic Women's Cup

== Honours ==
Rīgas FS

Winner

- Latvian Women's League: 2014
