= Lisette Tammik =

Estonian footballer (born 1998)

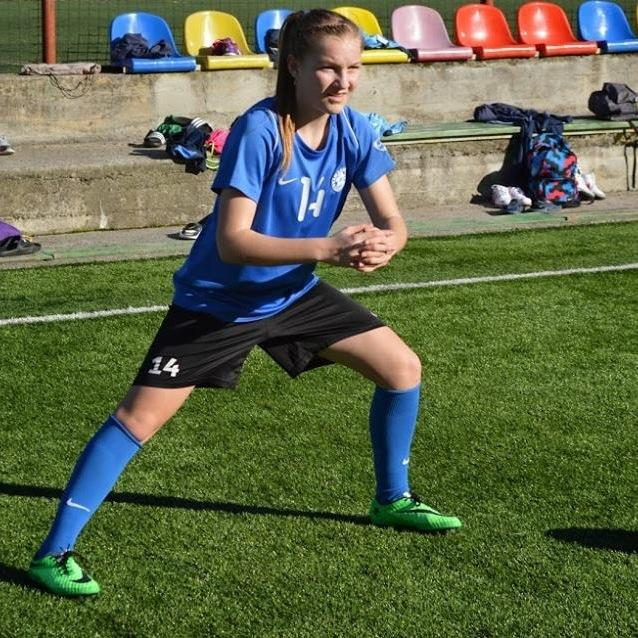
- Tammik in 2016

Personal information
- Date of birth: 14 October 1998 (age 28)
- Place of birth: Tallinn, Estonia
- Position: Forward

Team information
- Current team: Paide Linnameeskond
- Number: 59

Senior career*
Years	Team	Apps	(Gls)
2014–2018	Flora	75	(71)
2018–2020	Napoli	36	(32)
2020	Santa Teresa	6	(0)
2021–2025	Flora	100	(114)
2026-	Paide Linnameeskond	24	(21)

International career^{‡}
2012–2014	Estonia U-17	14	(4)
2014–2016	Estonia U-19	33	(6)
2015–	Estonia	83	(18)
- * Club domestic league appearances and goals as of 14 April 2026 ‡ National team caps and goals as of 9 June 2026

Lisette Tammik (born 14 October 1998) is an Estonian footballer who plays as a forward for Estonian Naiste Meistriliiga club Flora and the Estonia women's national team.

== Career ==
Tammik has been capped for the Estonia national team, appearing for the team during the 2019 FIFA Women's World Cup qualifying cycle.

In April 2021, it was announced that she would become the first professional player in the history of the Naiste Meistriliiga, with FC Flora stating an intention of signing an additional two to three players on paid contracts.

== International goals ==
No.	Date	Venue	Opponent	Score	Result	Competition
1.	16 March 2016	Parekklisia, Cyprus	Lithuania	2–0	3–0	Friendly
2.	4 April 2018	Istanbul, Turkey	Turkey	1–2	2–3	Friendly
3.	13 June 2021	Jonava Stadium, Jonava, Lithuania	Latvia	1–0	4–1	2021 Baltic Women's Cup
4.	28 June 2022	Pärnu Rannastaadion, Pärnu, Estonia	Kazakhstan	4–2	4–2	2023 FIFA Women's World Cup qualification
5.	6 October 2022	Tamme Stadium, Tartu, Estonia	Lithuania	1–0	4–1	2022 Baltic Women's Cup
6.	9 October 2022	Tamme Stadium, Tartu, Estonia	Faroe Islands	1–0	3–1	2022 Baltic Women's Cup
7.	21 February 2023	Gold City Sport Complex, Alanya, Turkey	North Macedonia	1–0	1–1	2023 Turkish Women's Cup
8.	17 July 2023	Kadriorg Stadium, Tallinn, Estonia	Turkey	1–2	2–2	Friendly
9.	27 October 2023	Vazgen Sargsyan Republican Stadium, Yerevan, Armenia	Armenia	1–0	4–1	2023–24 UEFA Women's Nations League
10.	27 October 2023	Vazgen Sargsyan Republican Stadium, Yerevan, Armenia	Armenia	2–0	4–1	2023–24 UEFA Women's Nations League
11.	27 October 2023	Vazgen Sargsyan Republican Stadium, Yerevan, Armenia	Armenia	3–0	4–1	2023–24 UEFA Women's Nations League
12.	31 October 2023	Lilleküla Stadium, Tallinn, Estonia	Armenia	1–0	5–1	2023–24 UEFA Women's Nations League
13.	31 October 2023	Lilleküla Stadium, Tallinn, Estonia	Armenia	5–1	5–1	2023–24 UEFA Women's Nations League
14.	5 December 2023	Globall Football Park, Telki, Hungary	Israel	1–4	1–4	2023–24 UEFA Women's Nations League
15.	21 February 2024	Gold City Sport Complex, Alanya, Turkey	India	1–1	3–4	2024 Turkish Women's Cup
16.	12 July 2024	Stade Émile Mayrisch, Esch-sur-Alzette, Luxembourg	Luxembourg	1–1	1–1	UEFA Women's Euro 2025 qualifying
17.	18 April 2026	Lilleküla Stadium, Tallinn, Estonia	Lithuania	2–1	2–1	2027 FIFA Women's World Cup qualification
18.	5 June 2026	Rheinpark Stadion, Vaduz, Liechtenstein	Liechtenstein	3–0	5–0	2027 FIFA Women's World Cup qualification

== Honours ==
Flora

- Naiste Meistriliiga: 2018, 2021, 2022, 2023, 2024
- Estonian Women's Supercup: 2018, 2022, 2023, 2024

Paide Linnanaiskond

- Naiste Meistriliiga: 2026

Napoli

- Serie B: 2019–20
- Serie C: 2018–19

Individual

- Naiste Meistriliiga Top Scorer: 2017, 2021, 2024
