= Ketlin Saar =

Estonian footballer

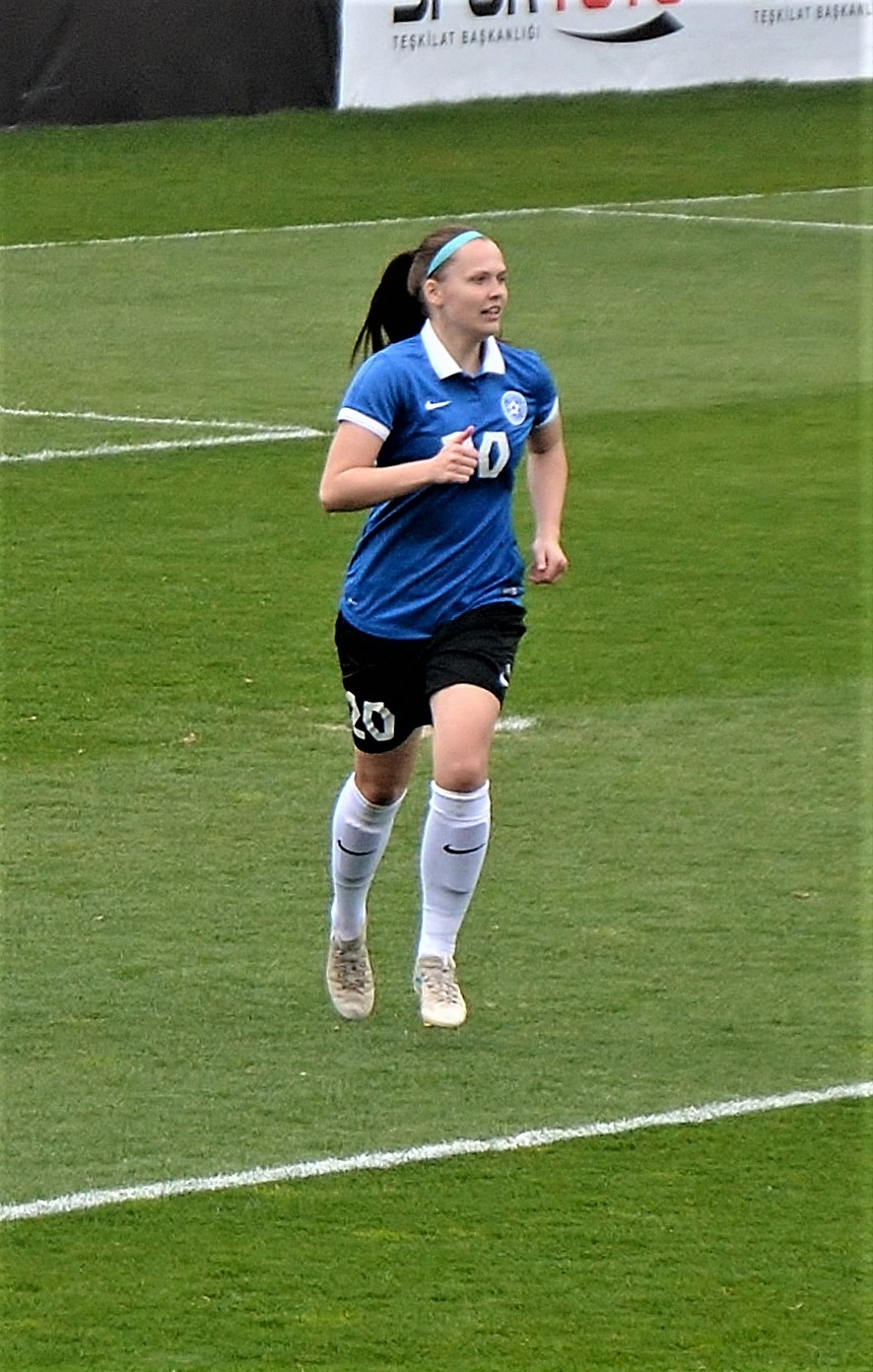

Personal information
- Date of birth: 2 May 1997 (age 29)
- Place of birth: Tallinn, Estonia
- Position: Defender

Team information
- Current team: Tallinna Kalev

Senior career*
Years	Team	Apps	(Gls)
- Tallinna Kalev

International career^{‡}
2014–	Estonia	34	(1)
- * Club domestic league appearances and goals as of 19:37, 30 August 2019 (UTC) ‡ National team caps and goals as of 20:49, 30 March 2020 (UTC)

Ketlin Saar (born 2 May 1997) is an Estonian footballer who plays as a defender for JK Tallinna Kalev and the Estonia women's national team.

== Career ==
Saar has been capped for the Estonia national team, appearing for the team during the 2019 FIFA Women's World Cup qualifying cycle.
