= Heleri Saar =

Estonian footballer (born 1979)

Personal information
- Date of birth: 16 November 1979 (age 46)
- Place of birth: Pärnu, then part of Estonian SSR, Soviet Union
- Position: Defender

Senior career*
Years	Team	Apps	(Gls)
1994–2017	Pärnu JK		

International career^{‡}
1996–	Estonia	66	(0)
- * Club domestic league appearances and goals ‡ National team caps and goals as of 1 January 2022

Heleri Saar (born 16 November 1979) is an Estonian footballer, playing as a defender. She was a member of the Estonia women's national football team from 1996 to 2021, playing 66 matches.

== Personal life ==
She has a son, Ricardo.
