= Kethy Õunpuu =

Estonian footballer (born 1987)

Personal information
- Full name: Kethy Õunpuu
- Date of birth: 4 December 1987 (age 38)
- Position: Midfielder

Senior career*
Years	Team	Apps	(Gls)
2005	Kehtna United	18	(9)
2006–2009	Kalev Tallinn	62	(12)
2009–2022	Flora		

International career^{‡}
2008–2022	Estonia	116	(3)
- * Club domestic league appearances and goals ‡ National team caps and goals as of 7 October 2022

Kethy Õunpuu (born 4 December 1987) is an Estonian football player who played for Naiste Meistriliiga clubs Flora and Kalev Tallinn and the Estonia women's national football team.

== International career ==
She made her debut for the Estonia women's national football team on 27 June 2008 against Turkey and has since been capped more than 100 times.
