= Karina Kork =

Estonian footballer

Personal information
- Date of birth: 23 February 1995 (age 31)
- Place of birth: Tallinn, Estonia,
- Height: 1.83 m (6 ft 0 in)
- Position: Goalkeeper

Team information
- Current team: IFK Kalmar
- Number: 1

Senior career*
Years	Team	Apps	(Gls)
2011–2020	Tallinna Kalev		
2020	HJK	0	(0)
2022	IFK Kalmar	12	(0)
2024-	Tabasalu	25	(0)

International career^{‡}
2013	Estonia U-19	4	(0)
2019–	Estonia	48	(0)
- * Club domestic league appearances and goals as of 1 October 2025 ‡ National team caps and goals as of 1 October 2025

Karina Kork (born 23 February 1995) is an Estonian footballer who plays as a goalkeeper for IFK Kalmar and the Estonia women's national team.

== Career ==
Kork has been a member of the Estonia national team since 2019. After making 188 appearances for Estonian club Tallinna Kalev, she signed for Finnish club HJK. In her debut season for HJK, she was largely a backup for their main goalkeeper Anna Koivunen.
