= Reelika Vaher =

Estonian footballer

Personal information
- Date of birth: 30 August 1978 (age 48)
- Place of birth: Pärnu, then part of Estonian SSR, Soviet Union
- Position: Midfielder

International career^{‡}
Years	Team	Apps	(Gls)
1994–2006	Estonia	47	(8)
- ‡ National team caps and goals as of 19:36, 1 March 2021 (UTC)

Reelika Vaher (born 30 August 1978) is an Estonian former footballer who played as a midfielder for the Estonia women's national team.

== Career ==
Vaher played in the first ever official match for Estonia, against Lithuania. In 2007, she was voted as Estonian Female Footballer of the Year.

== Personal life ==
In her youth, Vaher took up swimming as a hobby. She was an amateur footballer and trained with her club about three or four times a week. She worked for Sampo Group as a loan manager as her main source of income.
