= Justina Lavrenovaitė-Perez =

Lithuanian football referee

Personal information
- Birth name: Justina Lavrenovaitė
- Date of birth: 7 October 1984 (age 42)
- Position: Midfielder

Senior career*
Years	Team	Apps	(Gls)
2010	Victorya Voronovo	6	(0)
2015	Vilniaus FM-JL Stars	3	(1)

International career^{‡}
2001–2002	Lithuania U19	5	(0)
2006–2011	Lithuania	5	(0)
- * Club domestic league appearances and goals as of 24 May 2015 ‡ National team caps and goals as of 8 March 2011

Justina Lavrenovaitė-Perez (née Lavrenovaitė; born 7 October 1984) is a Lithuanian football referee and a former player who played as a midfielder. She has been a member of the Lithuania women's national team.
