= Pille Raadik =

Estonian footballer

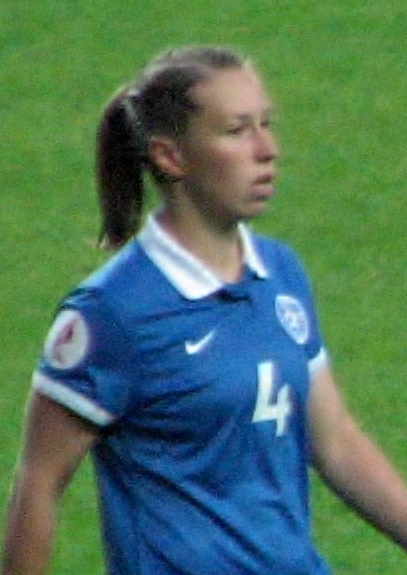

Personal information
- Full name: Pille Raadik
- Date of birth: 12 February 1987 (age 39)
- Place of birth: Tallinn, then part of Estonian SSR, Soviet Union
- Height: 1.62 m (5 ft 4 in)
- Position: Defender

Senior career*
Years	Team	Apps	(Gls)
2004–2006	Piraaja Kehra		
2007–2008	Tallinna Kalev		
2009–2010	Flora Tallinn		
2011–2023	Åland United	261	(17)

International career
2009–2021	Estonia	88	(0)
- * Club domestic league appearances and goals

Pille Raadik (born 12 February 1987) is a retired Estonian football defender who last played for Åland United in Finland's Naistenliiga and the Estonian national team. She formerly played in the Meistriliiga for Flora Tallinn.
