= Elīza Spruntule =

Latvian footballer

Personal information
- Date of birth: 11 January 1993 (age 33)
- Place of birth: Latvia
- Position: Defender

Senior career*
Years	Team	Apps	(Gls)
2011-2019	Rīgas Futbola skola		
2019-2020	SK Supernova		
2019	FK Olaine		
2020-2021	ÍBV	15	(0)

International career^{‡}
2009	Latvia U17	3	(0)
2010-2011	Latvia U19	6	(0)
2011-2021	Latvia	47	(2)
- * Club domestic league appearances and goals as of 31 October 2024 (UTC) ‡ National team caps and goals as of 15:12, 31 October 2024 (UTC)

Elīza Spruntule (born 11 January 1993) is a former Latvian footballer who played as a defender and has appeared for the Latvia women's national team.

== Career ==
Spruntule has been capped for the Latvia national team, appearing for the team during the 2019 FIFA Women's World Cup qualifying cycle.
