= Kaidi Jekimova =

Estonian footballer

Personal information
- Full name: Kaidi Jekimova
- Date of birth: 28 June 1979 (age 47)
- Place of birth: Tallinn, then part of Estonian SSR, Soviet Union
- Position: Attacking midfielder

Senior career*
Years	Team	Apps	(Gls)
- TKSK Visa
2006–	Levadia Tallinn		

International career^{‡}
2000–2014	Estonia	68	(9)
- * Club domestic league appearances and goals as of 30 October 2012 ‡ National team caps and goals as of 20 August 2017

Kaidi Jekimova (born 28 June 1979) is a retired Estonian footballer who played as an attacking midfielder. She played 68 times for the Estonian women's national football team.

== International goals ==
Goals scored for the Estonian WNT in official competitions
Competition	Stage	Date	Location	Opponent	Goals	Result	Overall
2015 FIFA World Cup	Qualifiers	2013–10–30	Strumica	North Macedonia	1	2–0	1
