= Kaire Palmaru =

Estonian footballer (born 1984)

Personal information
- Full name: Kaire Palmaru
- Date of birth: 11 August 1984 (age 42)
- Place of birth: Pärnu, then part of Estonian SSR, Soviet Union
- Height: 1.71 m (5 ft 7 1/2 in)
- Position: Midfielder

Team information
- Current team: Saku Sporting
- Number: 50

Senior career*
Years	Team	Apps	(Gls)
1998–2001	Pärnu Bussipark	58	(13)
2002–2015	Pärnu	252	(147)
2016	Fart	18	(1)
2017–2018	Pärnu	22	(30)
2019–	Saku Sporting	15	(7)

International career^{‡}
2001–	Estonia	107	(10)
- * Club domestic league appearances and goals as of 22 September 2019 ‡ National team caps and goals as of 7 November 2019

Kaire Palmaru (born 11 August 1984) is an Estonian footballer who plays as a midfielder for Saku Sporting. She is one of Estonia's most capped players of all time.
