= Liivi Sõrmus =

Estonian footballer

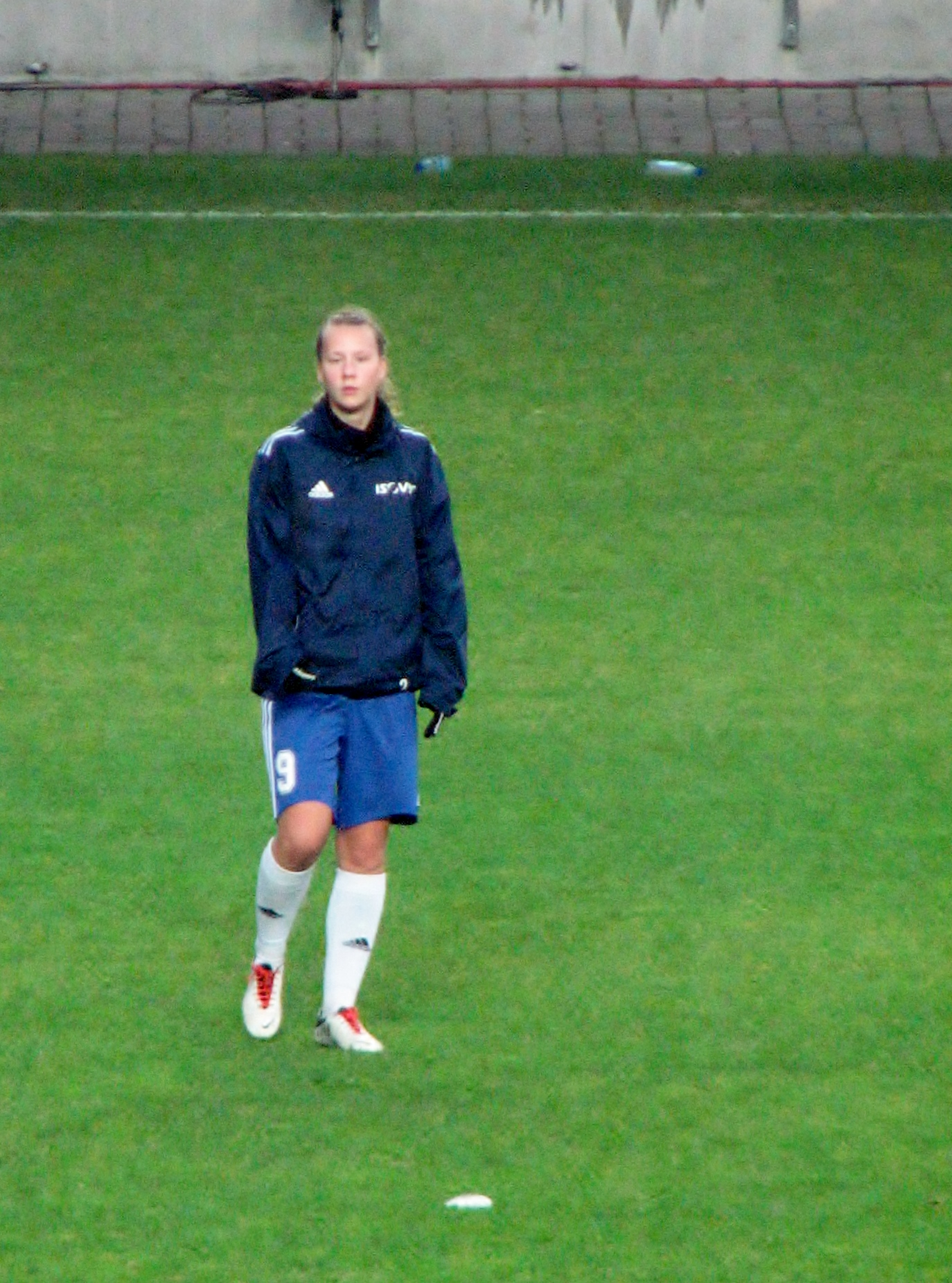
- Liivi Sõrmus in 2013

Personal information
- Date of birth: 17 February 1992 (age 34)
- Place of birth: Pärnu, Estonia
- Position: Midfielder

International career^{‡}
Years	Team	Apps	(Gls)
2011–2018	Estonia	13	(1)
- ‡ National team caps and goals as of 19:37, 30 August 2019 (UTC)

Liivi Sõrmus (born 17 February 1992) is an Estonian footballer who plays as a midfielder and has appeared for the Estonia women's national team.

== Career ==
Sõrmus has been capped for the Estonia national team, appearing for the team during the 2019 FIFA Women's World Cup qualifying cycle.

In 2018, she moved from Pärnu JK to FC Kirkop United in Malta.
