= Parekklisia =

- Village
- Location in Cyprus
- Coordinates: 34°44′26″N 33°9′39″E
- Country: Cyprus
- District: Limassol District

Population (2021)
  - Total: 3,492
- Time zone: UTC+2 (EET)
  - Summer (DST): UTC+3 (EEST)

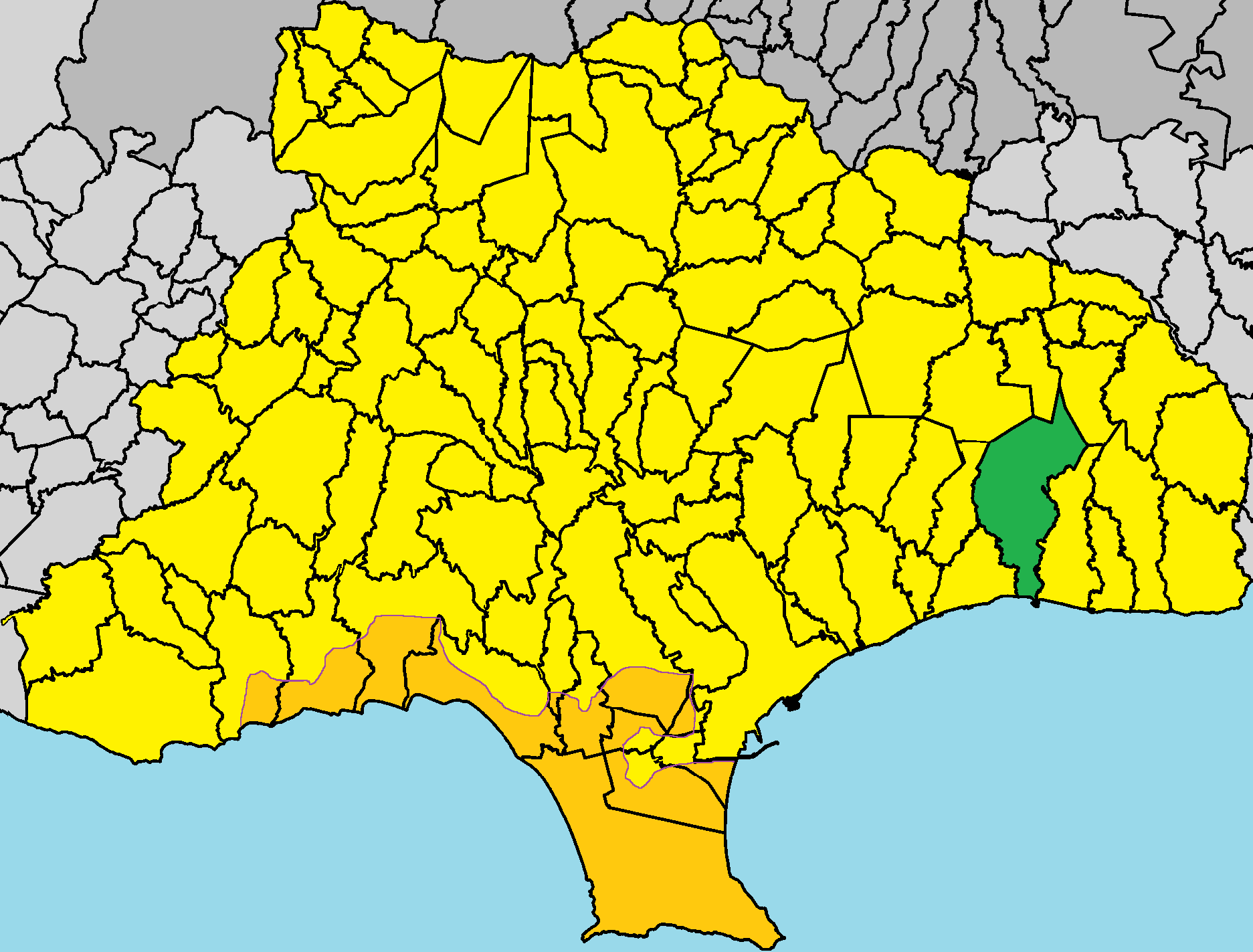
Map showing Parekklisia, Limassol District, Cyprus

Parekklisia (Greek: Παρεκκλησιά [locally [parekliˈʃa]]) is a village in the Limassol District of Cyprus, located northeast of Agios Tychonas. As a village near the sea, it was first inhabited in the Early Aceramic Neolithic Period about 8200 B.C. in the site named "Shillourokambos". There, in a tomb, French archaeologists discovered the earliest domesticated cat in the world.
