= Savivaldybė Stadium =

Sports venue in Šiauliai, Lithuania

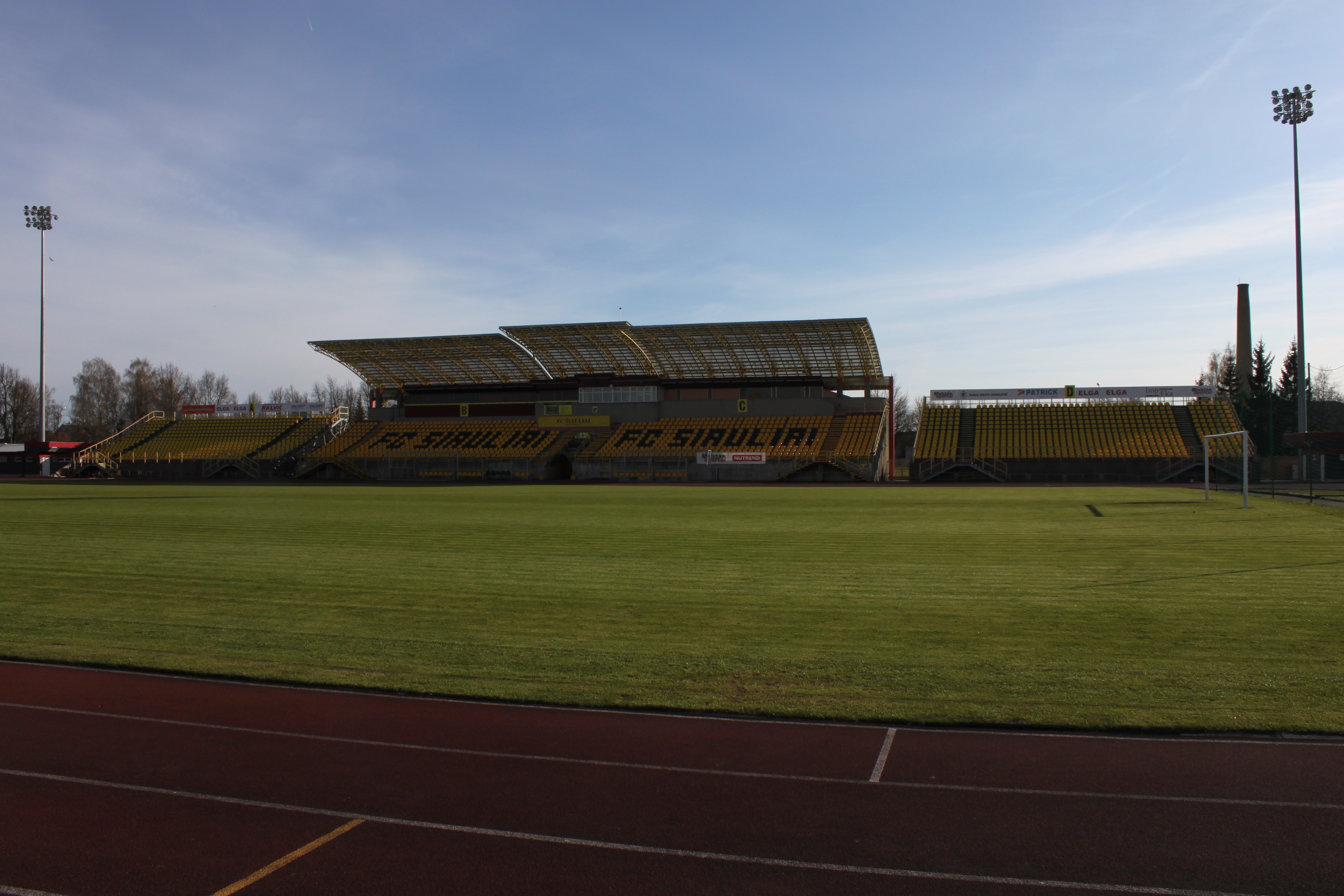
- Interactive map of Savivaldybė Stadium
- Location: S. Daukanto g. 23; Šiauliai; Lithuania; 76331
- Coordinates: 55°56′12″N 23°17′44″E
- Capacity: 3,017
- Surface: Grass

Construction
- Built: 1962

Tenants
- FA Šiauliai; FC Gintra

Šiauliai city municipality stadium, known as Šiauliai Central Stadium for UEFA competitions, is a multi-use stadium in Šiauliai, Lithuania. It is currently used mostly for football matches and is the home stadium of FA Šiauliai and FC Gintra.

The stadium has also been used by the Lithuania women's national football team and was a venue at the 2018 UEFA Women's Under-17 Championship.

Originally built in 1962, the stadium holds 3,017 people.
