= Kristina Bannikova =

Estonian footballer (born 1991)

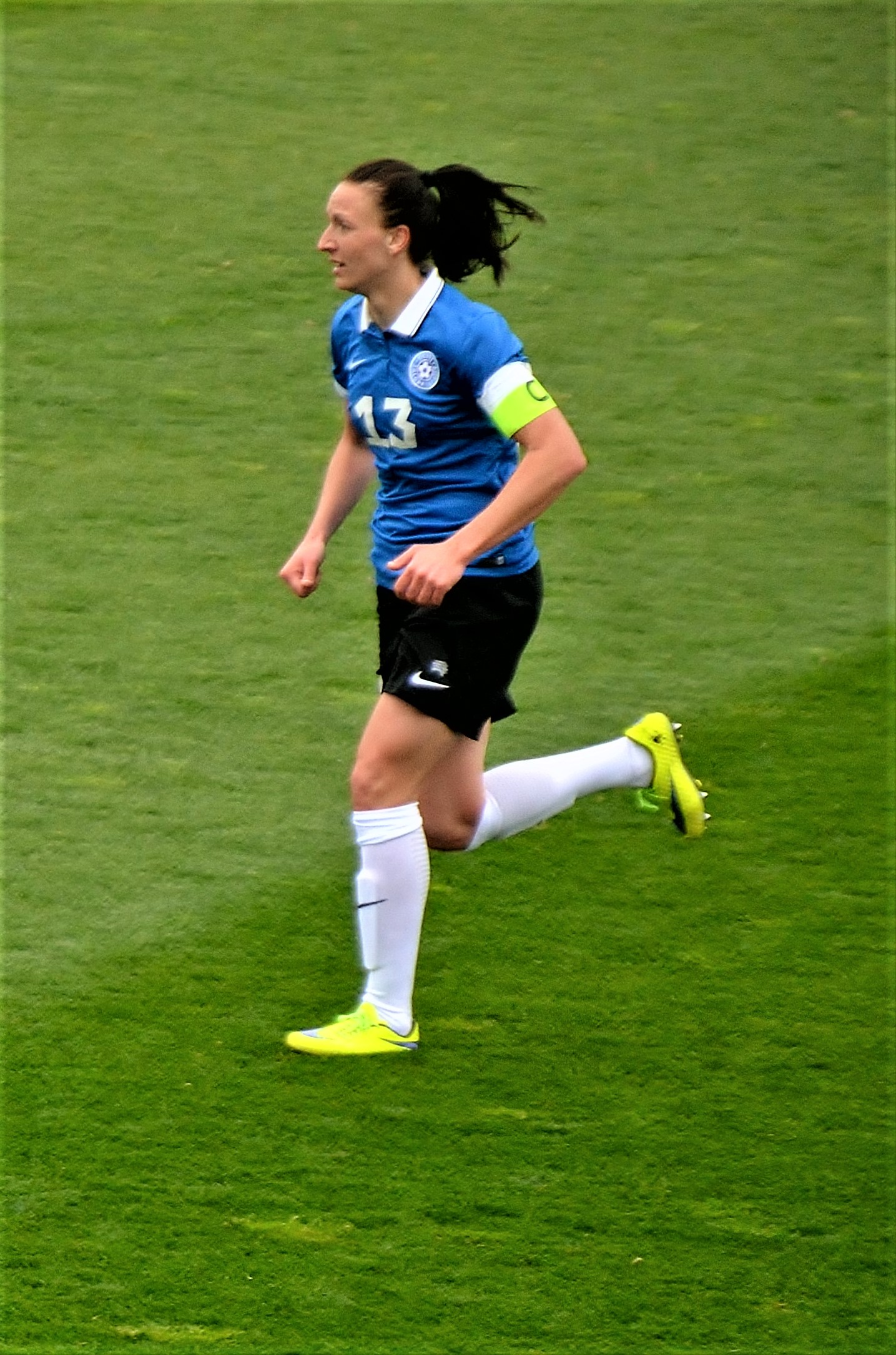
- Bannikova playing for Estonia national in 2018.

Personal information
- Full name: Kristina Bannikova
- Date of birth: 15 June 1991 (age 35)
- Position: Midfielder

Team information
- Current team: Pärnu

Senior career*
Years	Team	Apps	(Gls)
2011–2012	Tammeka Tartu		
2013–	Pärnu	20	(2)

International career^{‡}
2013–	Estonia	101	(8)
- * Club domestic league appearances and goals as of 6 November 2013 ‡ National team caps and goals as of 3 November 2023

Kristina Bannikova (born 15 June 1991) is an Estonian football player, who plays as a striker for Naiste Meistriliiga club Pärnu and the Estonia women's national football team.

== International goals ==
No.	Date	Venue	Opponent	Score	Result	Competition
8.	14 November 2022	Stadion Topolica, Bar, Montenegro	Montenegro	1–1	2–1	Friendly
9.	1 December 2023	Astana Arena, Astana, Kazakhstan	Kazakhstan	1–0	1–0	2023–24 UEFA Women's Nations League
