= Women's Baltic Cup =

Football competition among the national teams from Baltic countries

- Founded: 1996
- Region: Baltic (UEFA)
- Teams: 4
- Current champions: Latvia (6th title)
- Most championships: Estonia (12 titles)
- 2025 Baltic Women's Cup

The Women's Baltic Cup is a women's association football tournament contested between the Baltic states of Estonia, Latvia, and Lithuania, usually every year. They can also invite other teams to participate, such as the Faroe Islands. The tournament is the women's equivalent of the men's Baltic Cup.

== Results ==
Year	Host	Champions	Runners-up	Third place	Fourth place
1996	(Lithuania) Telšiai	Lithuania	Latvia	Estonia	
1997	(Estonia) Viljandi	Latvia	Lithuania	Estonia	
1998	(Latvia) Riga	Lithuania (2)	Estonia	Latvia	
2003	(Estonia) Pärnu	Estonia	Lithuania	Latvia	
2004	(Lithuania) Ukmergė	Estonia (2)	Lithuania	Latvia	
2005	(Latvia) Ventspils	Estonia (3)	Lithuania	Latvia	
2006	(Estonia) Pärnu	Estonia (4)	Lithuania	Latvia	
2007	(Lithuania) Šiauliai	Lithuania (3)	Estonia	Latvia	
2008	(Latvia) Valmiera	Estonia (5)	Lithuania	Latvia	
2009	(Estonia) Põlva	Estonia (6)	Lithuania	Latvia	
2010	(Lithuania) Šiauliai	Estonia (7)	Lithuania	Latvia	
2011	(Latvia) Staicele	Latvia (2)	Estonia	Lithuania	
2012	(Estonia) Tartu	Estonia (8)	Lithuania	Latvia	
2013	(Lithuania) Vilnius	Estonia (9)	Lithuania	Latvia	
2014	(Lithuania) Šiauliai	Estonia (10)	Lithuania	Latvia	
2015	(Estonia) Tallinn	Lithuania (4)	Estonia	Latvia	
2016	(Latvia) Riga	Faroe Islands	Latvia	Lithuania	Estonia
2017	(Lithuania) Šiauliai	Latvia (3)	Lithuania	Estonia	
2018	(Estonia) Tallinn	Latvia (4)	Estonia	Lithuania	
2019	(Latvia) Riga	Latvia (5)	Lithuania	Estonia	
2021	(Lithuania) Alytus/Jonava	Lithuania (5)	Faroe Islands	Estonia	Latvia
2022	(Estonia) Tartu/Võru	Estonia (11)	Faroe Islands	Lithuania	Latvia
2024	(Latvia) Riga	Estonia (12)	Latvia	Faroe Islands	Lithuania
2025	(Lithuania) Raudondvaris	Latvia (6)	Lithuania	Estonia	Faroe Islands

== Medal summary ==
As of 2025.

Rank	Nation	Gold	Silver	Bronze	Total
1	Estonia	12	5	6	23
2	Latvia	6	3	13	22
3	Lithuania	5	14	4	23
4	Faroe Islands	1	2	1	4
Totals (4 entries)		24	24	24	72

== See also ==
- Baltic Cup
- Baltic Futsal Cup
- Women's Baltic Football League
