= Estonia women's national football team =

Women's national association football team representing Estonia

Estonia
- Nickname: Sinisärgid (Blueshirts)
- Association: Eesti Jalgpalli Liit (EJL)
- Confederation: UEFA (Europe)
- Head coach: Aleksandra Ševoldajeva
- Captain: Vlada Kubassova
- Most caps: Kethy Õunpuu (116)
- Top scorer: Anastassia Morkovkina (40)
- Home stadium: Lilleküla Stadium
- FIFA code: EST
First colours	Second colours

FIFA ranking
- Current: 98 ▲3 (20 October 2026)
- Highest: 71 (December 2013)
- Lowest: 111 (June 2022)

First international
- Lithuania 3–0 Estonia (Kaunas, Lithuania; 19 August 1994)

Biggest win
- Latvia 1–7 Estonia (Šiauliai, Lithuania; 15 May 2010); Estonia 6–0 Latvia (Tartu, Estonia; 10 June 2012); Estonia 8–2 Latvia (Tallinn, Estonia; 1 March 2014)

Biggest defeat
- Iceland 12–0 Estonia (Reykjavík, Iceland; 17 September 2009); France 12–0 Estonia (Le Havre, France; 28 October 2009)

The Estonia women's national football team (Estonian: Eesti naiste jalgpallikoondis) represents Estonia in international women's football matches and are controlled by the Estonian Football Association, the governing body for football in Estonia.

Estonia played its first international match on 19 August 1994 against Lithuania. The team's home ground is the Lilleküla Stadium in Tallinn, and the current manager is Aleksandra Ševoldajeva. Estonia has never qualified for the FIFA Women's World Cup or the UEFA Women's Championship. They have won the annual Women's Baltic Cup 12 times.

== Team image ==
=== Nicknames ===
The Estonia women's national football team has been known or nicknamed as the "Sinisärgid (Blueshirts)".

== Results and fixtures ==
The following is a list of match results in the last 12 months, as well as any future matches that have been scheduled.

Legend

Win Draw Loss Fixture

=== 2025 ===
29 November Friendly	Estonia	0–2	Lithuania	Tallinn, Estonia
15:30		Report	14' Jonušaitė; 77' Lazdauskaitė	Stadium: Sportland Arena; Referee: Jelena Jermolajeva

=== 2026 ===
3 March 2027 FIFA Women's World Cup qualification	Bosnia and Herzegovina	3–1	Estonia	FF BH Football Training Centre, Zenica
13:00	Milinković 36'; Šabanagić 45+3'; Grebenar 88'	Report	Räämet 41' (pen.)	Attendance: 100; Referee: Karoline Marie Jensen (Norway)

7 March 2027 FIFA Women's World Cup qualification	Lithuania	0–0	Estonia	Raudondvario stadionas, Raudondvaris
16:00		Report		Attendance: 587; Referee: Marina Živković (Serbia)

10 April Unofficial Friendly	Czechia U23 (Czech Republic)	4–0	Estonia	SC Radotín Stadium, Czech Republic
13:30	Jelinkova 03'; Tenkratova 08'; Hlavacova 33'; Hola 87'	Report

14 April 2027 FIFA Women's World Cup qualification	Estonia	2–1	Liechtenstein	Lilleküla Stadium, Tallinn
17:00	Kubassova 44' (pen.); Kirpu 84'	Report (FIFA); Report (UEFA)	Steck 50'	Attendance: 502; Referee: Rita Vehapi (Kosovo)

18 April 2027 FIFA Women's World Cup qualification	Estonia	2–1	Lithuania	Lilleküla Stadium, Tallinn
16:00	Lillemäe 42'; Tammik 90+3'	Report	Švarcaitė 30'	Attendance: 487; Referee: Asen Albayrak (Turkey)

5 June 2027 FIFA Women's World Cup qualification	Liechtenstein	0–5	Estonia	Rheinpark Stadion, Vaduz
19:00		Report (FIFA); Report (UEFA)	Kubassova 6'; Kirpu 29'; Tammik 50'; Merisalu 60'; Teern 83'	Attendance: 695; Referee: Araksya Saribekyan (Armenia)

9 June 2027 FIFA Women's World Cup qualification	Estonia	1–1	Bosnia and Herzegovina	Pärnu Rannastaadion, Pärnu
	Kubassova 10'	Report (FIFA); Report (UEFA)	Hasanbegović 23'	Referee: Michaela Pachtová (Czech Republic)

9 October Unofficial Friendly	Estonia	v	Czech Republic U23	Lilleküla Stadium, Tallinn
19:00

13 October Unofficial Friendly	Finland U23	v	Estonia	Finland
14:00

== Coaching staff ==
Position	Name
Manager	(Estonia) Aleksandra Ševoldajeva
Assistant manager	(Estonia) Valeri Makarov
Assistant manager	(Estonia) Ljubov Maksimova
Goalkeeping coach	(Estonia) Kevin Krünvald
Fitness coach	(Estonia) Maria Sootak
Physiotherapist	(Estonia) Helena Pallon
Physiotherapist	(Estonia) Kristiina Lind

== Players ==
=== Current squad ===
The following players were called up for the Women's Baltic Cup in November and December 2026.

Caps and goals correct as of 9 June 2026, after the match against Bosnia and Herzegovina.

No.	Pos.	Player	Date of birth (age)	Caps	Goals	Club
1	GK	Victoria Vihman	5 August 2004 (age 22)	2	0	(Estonian Football Association) Flora
13	GK	Liisa Liimets	4 April 2006 (age 20)	2	0	(Estonian Football Association) Viimsi
	GK	Cärolyn Eismann	24 February 2005 (age 21)	0	0	(Estonian Football Association) Saku Sporting
2	DF	Kristiina Tullus	12 September 1998 (age 28)	21	0	(Estonian Football Association) Flora
3	DF	Siret Räämet	31 December 1999 (age 26)	65	1	(Austrian Football Association) LASK
5	DF	Rahel Repkin	17 June 1998 (age 28)	24	0	(Estonian Football Association) Paide Linnanaiskond
16	DF	Kelly Rosen	23 November 1995 (age 30)	102	1	(Estonian Football Association) Flora
18	DF	Annegret Kala	3 May 2006 (age 20)	26	1	(Estonian Football Association) Paide Linnanaiskond
	DF	Anni Iiris Ilisson	14 February 2007 (age 19)	0	0	(Estonian Football Association) Paide Linnanaiskond
	DF	Mia-Lisette Sarapik	15 October 2006 (age 20)	0	0	(Swedish Football Association) Karlbergs BK
4	MF	Liselle Palts	2 December 2005 (age 20)	16	1	(Italian Football Federation) Catania
7	MF	Liisa Rebane	15 January 2002 (age 24)	49	4	(Estonian Football Association) Viimsi
9	MF	Katrin Kirpu	9 October 2004 (age 22)	31	4	(Austrian Football Association) LASK
11	MF	Anette Salei	28 September 2005 (age 21)	29	3	(French Football Federation) US Colomiers
15	MF	Anastasija Južaninova	5 April 2009 (age 17)	2	0	(Estonian Football Association) Flora
17	MF	Mari Liis Lillemäe	1 September 2000 (age 26)	70	4	(Italian Football Federation) Catania
20	MF	Lisandra Rannasto	13 January 2004 (age 22)	10	0	(Estonian Football Association) Paide Linnanaiskond
	MF	Jaanika Volkov	20 February 2005 (age 21)	27	0	(Austrian Football Association) LASK
6	FW	Katriin Saulus	5 July 2003 (age 23)	21	1	(Estonian Football Association) Saku Sporting
14	FW	Lisette Tammik	14 October 1998 (age 28)	83	18	(Estonian Football Association) Paide Linnanaiskond
19	FW	Vlada Kubassova (captain)	23 August 1995 (age 31)	87	17	(Hungarian Football Federation) Ferencváros
22	FW	Kristina Teern	13 November 2004 (age 22)	25	3	(Italian Football Federation) Catania
	FW	Kärt Hüdsi	4 September 2003 (age 23)	0	0	(Estonian Football Association) Elva
	FW	Gretlin Pihlak	24 December 2010 (age 15)	0	0	(Estonian Football Association) Flora

=== Recent call-ups ===
The following players have also been called up to the squad within the past 12 months.

Pos.	Player	Date of birth (age)	Caps	Goals	Club	Latest call-up
GK	Katarina Elisabeth Käpa	16 March 2006 (age 20)	16	0	(Poland) Medyk Konin	v. Bosnia and Herzegovina, 9 June 2026
DF	Elisabet Polstjanova	1 March 2005 (age 21)	1	0	(Estonia) Viimsi	v. Bosnia and Herzegovina, 9 June 2026
DF	Helina Tarkmeel	20 September 2005 (age 21)	11	0	(Estonia) Flora	v. Lithuania, 18 April 2026
DF	Anett Joandi	4 November 2004 (age 22)	0	0	(Estonia) Flora	v. Lithuania, 7 March 2026
DF	Liis Getter Saar	10 January 2007 (age 19)	0	0	(Estonia) Viimsi	v. Lithuania, 29 November 2025
MF	Loviise Männiste	24 February 2008 (age 18)	14	0	(Estonia) Elva	v. Bosnia and Herzegovina, 9 June 2026
MF	Aleksandra Kelli	11 August 2006 (age 20)	3	0	(Estonia) Paide Linnanaiskond	v. Bosnia and Herzegovina, 9 June 2026
MF	Karola Purgats ^{PRE}	6 April 2006 (age 20)	13	0	(Estonia) Flora	v. Liechtenstein, 5 June 2026
MF	Valeria Liik ^{PRE}	5 July 2003 (age 23)	1	0	(Estonia) Saku Sporting	v. Liechtenstein, 5 June 2026
MF	Nicole Kelli	26 May 2008 (age 18)	0	0	(Estonia) Paide Linnanaiskond	v. Lithuania, 18 April 2026
MF	Anastasija Fjodorova	2 August 2003 (age 23)	1	0	(Estonia) Harju	v. Lithuania, 29 November 2025
FW	Anželika Jotkina	10 September 2007 (age 19)	6	1	(Switzerland) Basel	v. Bosnia and Herzegovina, 9 June 2026
FW	Emma Treiberg ^{MED}	19 November 2000 (age 26)	43	4	(Estonia) Saku Sporting	v. Liechtenstein, 14 April 2026
FW	Getter Saar	9 November 1999 (age 27)	18	3	(Estonia) Flora	v. Lithuania, 29 November 2025
Notes: ^{INJ} = Withdrew due to injury; ^{MED} = Withdrew due to medical reasons; ^{PRE} = Preliminary squad

== Records ==
As of 9 June 2026

Players in bold are still active with the national team.

=== Most appearances ===
Rank	Player	Career	Caps	Goals
1	Kethy Õunpuu	2005–2022	116	3
2	Katrin Loo	2007–2020	114	20
3	Signy Aarna	2007–2023	107	26
3	Kaire Palmaru	2001–2019	107	10
5	**Inna Kiss-Zlidnis**	2007–present	105	0
6	Kristina Bannikova	2013–2023	103	9
7	**Kelly Rosen**	2014–present	102	1
8	Pille Raadik	2007–2021	88	0
9	**Vlada Kubassova**	2013–present	87	17
10	**Lisette Tammik**	2015–present	83	18

=== Top goalscorers ===
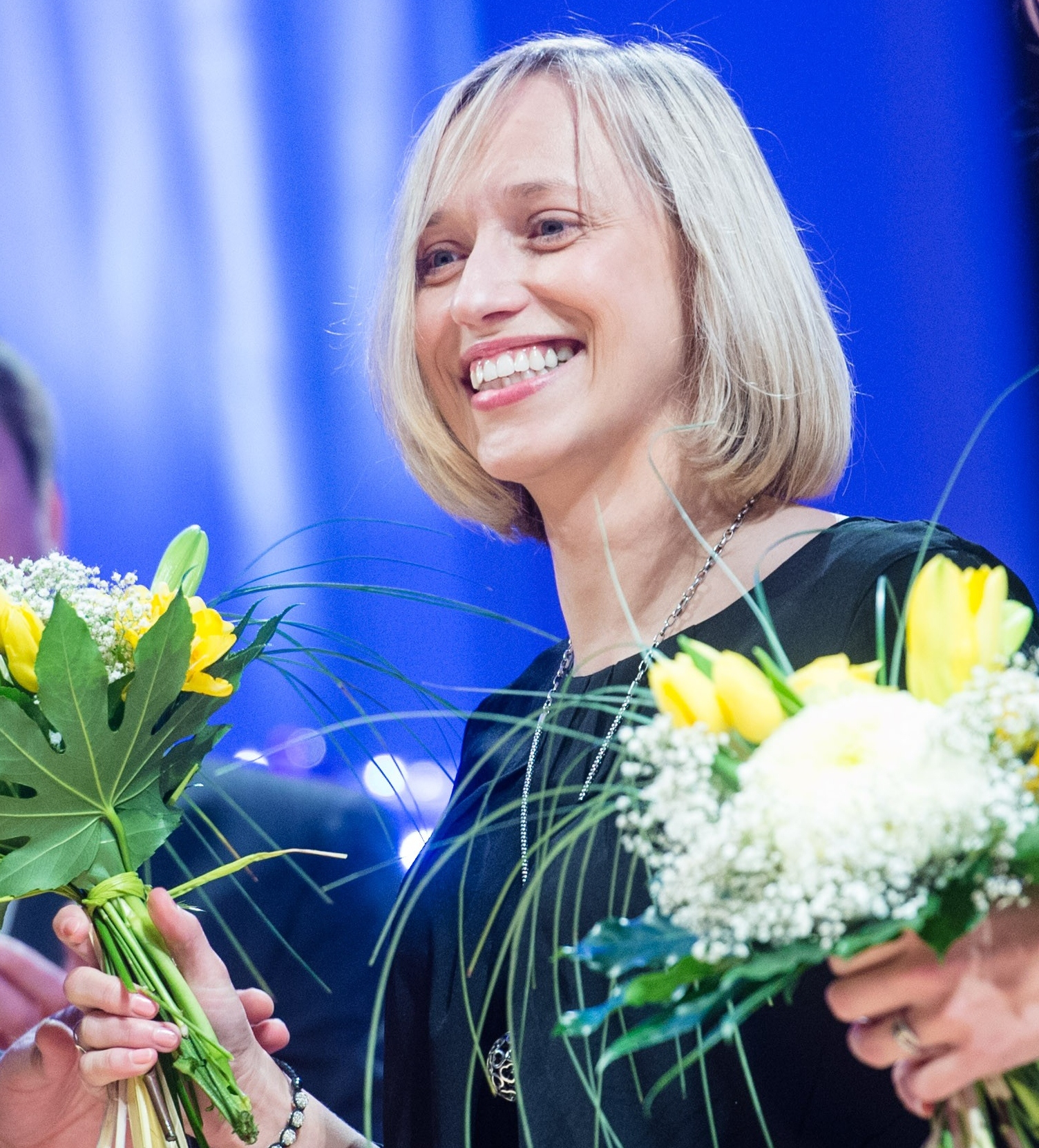
Anastassia Morkovkina is Estonia's top goalscorer with 40 goals.

Rank	Player	Career	Goals	Caps	Avg.
1	Anastassia Morkovkina	1997–2015	40	75	0.53
2	Signy Aarna	2007–2023	26	107	0.24
3	Katrin Loo	2007–2020	20	114	0.18
4	Ave Pajo	2000–2010	19	40	0.48
5	**Lisette Tammik**	2015–present	18	83	0.22
6	**Vlada Kubassova**	2013–present	17	87	0.20
7	Kaire Palmaru	2001–2019	10	107	0.09
8	Kaidi Jekimova	2000–2014	9	68	0.13
8	Kristina Bannikova	2013–2023	9	103	0.09
10	Reelika Vaher	1994–2006	8	47	0.17

== Competitive record ==
=== FIFA Women's World Cup ===
FIFA Women's World Cup record									Qualification record					
Year	Rnd	Pos	Pld	W	D	L	GF	GA	Pld	W	D	L	GF	GA
(China) 1991	Did not enter								Did not enter					
(Sweden) 1995	Did not enter								Did not enter					
(United States) 1999	Did not qualify								6	1	0	5	6	31
(United States) 2003	Did not qualify								8	0	0	8	4	36
(China) 2007	Did not qualify								6	1	1	4	6	18
(Germany) 2011	Did not qualify								10	3	1	6	7	44
(Canada) 2015	Did not qualify								10	2	1	7	8	33
(France) 2019	Did not qualify								3	0	0	3	1	7
(Australia) (New Zealand) 2023	Did not qualify								10	2	0	8	7	43
(Brazil) 2027	Did not qualify								6	3	2	1	11	6
(Costa Rica) (Jamaica) (Mexico) (United States) 2031	To be determined								To be determined					
(United Kingdom) 2035	To be determined								To be determined					
Total	–	–	–	–	–	–	–	–	59	12	5	42	50	218

Draws include knockout matches decided on penalty kicks.

=== UEFA Women's Championship ===
UEFA Women's Championship record									Qualification record							
Year	Rnd	Pos	Pld	W	D	L	GF	GA	Pld	W	D	L	GF	GA	P/R	Rnk
(England) (Italy) (Norway) (Sweden) 1984	Did not enter								Did not enter							
(Norway) 1987	Did not enter								Did not enter							
(West Germany) 1989	Did not enter								Did not enter							
(Denmark) 1991	Did not enter								Did not enter							
(Italy) 1993	Did not enter								Did not enter							
(England) (Germany) (Norway) (Sweden) 1995	Did not enter								Did not enter							
(Norway) (Sweden) 1997	Did not qualify								6	0	0	6	0	43	–	
(Germany) 2001	Did not qualify								8	0	0	8	6	38	–	
(England) 2005	Did not qualify								6	1	1	4	6	26	–	
(Finland) 2009	Did not qualify								3	0	0	3	2	13	–	
(Sweden) 2013	Did not qualify								8	0	0	8	5	31	–	
(Netherlands) 2017	Did not qualify								8	0	0	8	0	33	–	
(England) 2022	Did not qualify								10	0	1	9	1	40	–	
(Switzerland) 2025	Did not qualify								4	0	2	2	3	6	(Note: From Euro 2025 onwards a new qualifying format was introduced, linked to the Women's Nations League where teams are divided into leagues with promotion/relegation between the leagues at the end of each cycle.)	46th
2029	To be determined								To be determined							
Total	–	–	–	–	–	–	–	–	53	1	4	48	23	230	46th	

Draws include knockout matches decided on penalty kicks.

=== UEFA Women's Nations League ===
UEFA Women's Nations League record
Year	League	Group	Pos	Pld	W	D	L	GF	GA	P/R	Rnk
2023–24	C	4	2nd	6	3	1	2	11	11	Same position	40th
2025	C	5	2nd	4	1	1	2	2	6	Same position	44th
Total				10	4	2	4	13	17	40th and 44th	

▲	Promoted at end of season
Same position	No movement at end of season
▼	Relegated at end of season
*	Participated in promotion/relegation play-offs

== Honours ==
=== Regional ===
Women's Baltic Cup

- Champions (12): 2003, 2004, 2005, 2006, 2008, 2009, 2010, 2012, 2013, 2014, 2022, 2024

== See also ==
- Sport in Estonia
  - Football in Estonia
- Estonia women's national under-19 football team
- Estonia women's national under-17 football team
- Estonia national football team
