= Naiste Meistriliiga Player of the Year =

Association football award

The Naiste Meistriliiga Player of the Year is an annual award given to the best Naiste Meistriliiga player for her performances in the league.

== Winners ==
Year	Player	Club
2009	(Russia) Svetlana Khvatova	Levadia Tallinn
2010	(Estonia) Signy Aarna	Lootos Põlva
2011	(Estonia) Margarita Žernosekova	Levadia Tallinn
2012	(Estonia) Anastassia Morkovkina	Pärnu
2013	(Estonia) Elis Meetua	Pärnu
2014	(Estonia) Kairi Himanen	Pärnu
2015	(Estonia) Anastassia Morkovkina	Pärnu
2016	(Estonia) Anastassia Morkovkina	Pärnu
2017	(Estonia) Lisette Tammik	Flora Tallinn
2018	(Estonia) Katrin Loo	Flora Tallinn
2019	(Estonia) Katrin Loo	Flora Tallinn
2020	(Estonia) Kristina Bannikova	Pärnu
2021	(Estonia) Kristina Bannikova	Pärnu
2022	(Estonia) Emma Treiberg	Saku Sporting
2023	(Estonia) Lisette Tammik	Flora Tallinn
2024	(Estonia) Lisette Tammik	Flora Tallinn
2025	(Estonia) Mari Liis Lillemäe	Flora Tallinn
