= 2013 Naiste Meistriliiga =

Estonian national championships in women's football

Naiste Meistriliiga
- Season: 2013
- Matches: 57
- Goals: 297 (5.21 per match)
- Top goalscorer: Anastassia Morkovkina (34)

The 2013 Naiste Meistriliiga was the 21st season of women's league football in Estonia.

The league was won by Pärnu JK, its 4th consecutive title and 9th overall. By winning, Pärnu qualified to 2014–15 UEFA Women's Champions League.

== League clubs ==
Location of the 2015 Naiste Meistriliiga teams

The following clubs are competing in Naiste Meistriliiga during the 2015 season:

Club	Location	Stadium	Manager
Flora	Tallinn	Lilleküla Stadium	(England) Richard Barnwell
Levadia	Tallinn	Maarjamäe Stadium	(Estonia) Maksim Rõtškov
Lootos	Põlva	Lootospark	(Estonia) Kaido-Meinhard Kukli
Pärnu	Pärnu	Pärnu Raeküla Stadium	(Estonia) Jüri Saar
SK 10 Premium	Tartu	Kambja Stadium	(Estonia) Mariliis Limbak
Tallinna Kalev	Tallinn	Kalev Central Stadium	(Estonia) Allan Soomets
Tammeka	Tartu	Tamme Stadium	(Estonia) Aleksandra Ševoldajeva

== Format ==
The 7 teams played each other twice for a total of 12 matches, with the top six teams qualifying for a championship round, where teams played each other once, bringing the total to 17 matches.

== League table ==
=== Regular season ===
Pos	Team	Pld	W	D	L	GF	GA	GD	Pts	Qualification
1	Pärnu	12	11	1	0	78	5	+73	34	Championship group
2	Flora	12	9	1	2	41	12	+29	28	Championship group
3	Levadia	12	7	1	4	36	15	+21	22	Championship group
4	Tammeka	12	5	1	6	16	14	+2	16	Championship group
5	Lootos	12	4	2	6	29	48	−19	14	Championship group
6	Tallinna Kalev	10	2	2	6	17	42	−25	8	Championship group
7	SK 10 Premium	12	0	0	12	1	82	−81	0	

=== Championship group ===
Pos	Team	Pld	W	D	L	GF	GA	GD	Pts	Qualification
1	Pärnu (C)	17	16	1	0	103	6	+97	49	Qualification to Champions League
2	Flora	17	11	2	4	56	20	+36	35	
3	Levadia	17	9	3	5	50	23	+27	30	
4	Tammeka	17	7	2	8	50	23	+27	23	
5	Lootos	17	6	2	9	40	65	−25	20	
6	Tallinna Kalev	17	2	2	13	22	78	−56	8	

(C) Champions

== Top scorers ==
Rank	Scorer	Club	Goals
1	(Estonia) Anastassia Morkovkina	Pärnu	34
2	(Estonia) Signy Aarna	Lootos	30
3	(Estonia) Margarita Žernosekova	Pärnu	28
4	(Estonia) Miina Kallas	Flora	18
5	(Estonia) Vlada Kubassova	Levadia	15
