= 2015 Naiste Meistriliiga =

Estonian national championships in women's football

Naiste Meistriliiga
- Season: 2015
- Champions: Pärnu JK (11th title)
- Relegated: Noortekoondis
- Champions League: Pärnu JK
- Matches played: 80
- Goals scored: 411 (5.14 per match)
- Top goalscorer: Anastassia Morkovkina (34 goals)
- All statistics correct as of 19 October 2015.

The 2015 Naiste Meistriliiga was the 23rd season of women's league football in Estonia.

The season was played between 4 April 2015, and 18 October 2015. The defending Champions were Pärnu JK, who successfully for the fifth year running defended their title. It is their 11th league title overall and gave them qualification to the 2016–17 UEFA Women's Champions League.

== League clubs ==
Location of the 2015 Naiste Meistriliiga teams

The following clubs competed in the 2015 Naiste Meistriliiga season:

Club	Location	Stadium	Manager
Flora	Tallinn	Lilleküla Stadium	(England) Richard Barnwell
Levadia	Tallinn	Maarjamäe Stadium	(Estonia) Maksim Rõtškov
Nõmme Kalju	Tallinn	Hiiu Stadium	(Brazil) Getúlio Fredo
Noortekoondis	Tallinn	EJL TNTK	(Estonia) Katrin Kaarna
Pärnu	Pärnu	Pärnu Raeküla Stadium	(Estonia) Jüri Saar
SK 10 Premium	Tartu	Kambja Stadium	(Estonia) Mariliis Limbak
Tallinna Kalev	Tallinn	Kalev Central Stadium	(Estonia) Allan Soomets
Tammeka	Tartu	Tamme Stadium	(Estonia) Aleksandra Ševoldajeva

== Format ==
The 8 teams play each other twice, for a total of 14 matches, with the top four teams qualifying for a championship round and the bottom four teams playing a relegation round.

== Regular season ==
=== League table ===
Pos	Team	Pld	W	D	L	GF	GA	GD	Pts	Qualification
1	Pärnu	14	14	0	0	109	2	+107	42	Championship group
2	Flora	14	11	0	3	61	15	+46	33	Championship group
3	Levadia	14	8	0	6	47	27	+20	24	Championship group
4	Tammeka	14	7	1	6	25	17	+8	22	Championship group
5	SK 10 Premium	14	6	1	7	23	45	−22	19	Relegation group
6	Tallinna Kalev	14	5	0	9	16	46	−30	15	Relegation group
7	Nõmme Kalju	14	3	0	11	8	44	−36	9	Relegation group
8	Noortekoondis	14	1	0	13	10	103	−93	3	Relegation group

=== Results ===
Home \ Away	10P	FLO	LEV	NOO	NÕM	PÄR	TAL	TAM
SK 10 Premium		2–4	3–2	3–1	3–0	1–11	1–3	1–0
Flora	3–1		5–0	10–0	1–0	0–2	6–0	1–0
Levadia	6–0	1–0		9–1	6–0	0–3	2–1	1–2
Noortekoondis	2–4	1–13	0–10		1–3	0–19	0–3	0–4
Nõmme Kalju	0–2	0–7	1–3	2–1		0–9	2–0	0–2
Pärnu	9–0	7–1	6–0	16–0	6–0		3–0	4–0
Tallinna Kalev	3–1	0–7	1–5	2–3	1–0	0–12		1–0
Tammeka	1–1	1–3	4–2	5–0	2–0	0–2	4–1	

Updated to match(es) played on 25 August 2015. Source: Soccerway
Legend: Blue = home team win; Yellow = draw; Red = away team win.

== Final stage ==
=== Championship group ===
Points and goals in the second stage are just added to the first stage. Each team will end on 20 games.

Pos	Team	Pld	W	D	L	GF	GA	GD	Pts	Qualification or relegation	PÄR	FLO	LEV	TAM
1	Pärnu (C)	20	20	0	0	145	5	+140	60	Qualification to Champions League		4–0	7–1	7–0
2	Flora	20	15	0	5	74	27	+47	45		1–5		3–1	2–0
3	Levadia	20	9	0	11	57	55	+2	27		1–7	2–6		2–3
4	Tammeka	20	8	1	11	30	38	−8	25		0–6	0–1	2–3	

Updated to match(es) played on 18 October 2015. Source: Soccerway
Rules for classification: 1) Points; 2) Goal difference; 3) Number of goals scored
(C) Champions

=== Relegation Group ===
Pos	Team	Pld	W	D	L	GF	GA	GD	Pts	Qualification or relegation	10P	TAL	NÕM	NOO
1	SK 10 Premium	20	12	1	7	53	45	+8	37			4–0	6–0	7–0
2	Tallinna Kalev	20	9	0	11	32	58	−26	27		0–7		3–1	5–0
3	Nõmme Kalju	20	3	1	16	9	63	−54	10	Relegation Playoff	0–3	0–6		0–1
4	Noortekoondis (R)	20	2	1	17	11	120	−109	7	Relegation to Esiliiga	0–3	0–2	0–0	

Updated to match(es) played on 18 October 2015. Source: Soccerway
Rules for classification: 1) Points; 2) Goal difference; 3) Number of goals scored
(R) Relegated

== Top scorers ==
As of 18 October 2015

Rank	Player	Club	Goals
1	(Estonia) Anastassia Morkovkina	Pärnu	34
2	(Estonia) Kristina Bannikova	Pärnu	27
3	(Estonia) Merily Toom	Pärnu	20
4	(Estonia) Liis Pello	Flora	18
4	(Estonia) Margarita Žernosekova	Pärnu	18
6	(Estonia) Kairi Himanen	Pärnu	17
7	(Estonia) Kelly Rosen	Flora	16
8	(Estonia) Lisette Tammik	Flora	13
9	(Russia) Anastasia Dodeltseva	Levadia	12
9	(Estonia) Cathy Pärnamets	Tammeka	12
9	(Estonia) Renita Roopalu	SK 10 Premium	12
