= Aljona Malets =

Estonian footballer

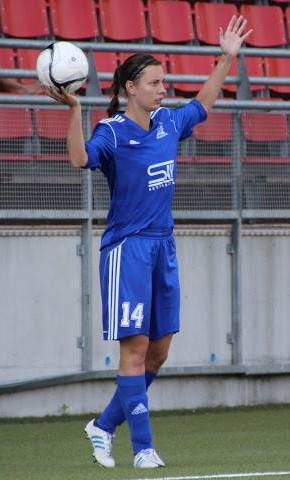
- Playing for Pärnu JK in 2013

Personal information
- Full name: Aljona Malets
- Date of birth: 6 May 1987 (age 39)
- Place of birth: Tallinn, then part of Estonian SSR, Soviet Union
- Position: Defender

Youth career
- 2003: FC Levadia Tallinn (TKSK Visa)

Senior career*
Years	Team	Apps	(Gls)
2004–2005	FC Levadia Tallinn (TKSK Visa)	39	(23)
2006–2012	FC Levadia Tallinn	117	(32)
2011	→ JK Tallinna Kalev	2	(0)
2012–2013	Pärnu JK	24	(3)
2013	→ Pärnu JK II	4	(0)

International career
2005	Estonia U-19	5	(1)
2006–2014	Estonia	15	(1)
- * Club domestic league appearances and goals

Aljona Malets (born 6 May 1987) is a retired Estonian football player, who last played as a defender for Naiste Meistriliiga club Pärnu JK. She has also played for FC Levadia Tallinn, taking part in the UEFA Women's Champions League with both teams. In 15 international games for Estonia women's national football team he scored one goal – on 26 of July 2008 against Lithuania in Women's Baltic Cup.

== Early life ==
Malets was born in Tallinn. She has been connected to sports since early childhood. Before starting her football career Aljona has been involved in horse riding, kayaking and figure skating, reaching success in local competitions in those disciplines.

== Career ==
=== Club career ===
==== FC Levadia Tallinn ====
Aljona started to play football at the age of 16. Her first club was FC Levadia Tallinn (former TKSK Visa) where she started as forward. Most notable moment of her career as an attacking player occurred in her very first season. Malets scored incredible 10 goals in one game against EVL Silwi Kehtna on matchday 8 of Naiste Meistriliiga. In season 2009 Aljona has been moved to defence, however this did not influence on her goal scoring abilities. Malets scored at least a goal in every season she has played for FC Levadia Tallinn.

==== Pärnu JK ====
In 2012 Aljona moved to Pärnu JK. It is symbolic that her first game for new team was against FC Levadia Tallinn. In 2013 Aljona helped Pärnu JK to qualify for the Knockout-stage of UEFA Women's Champions League for the first time in the club's history.

== Career statistics ==
As of 18 May 2014

Season	Club	League	League		Cup		Europe		Other		Total	
Season	Club	League	Apps	Goals	Apps	Goals	Apps	Goals	Apps	Goals	Apps	Goals
2004	FC Levadia Tallinn (TKSK Visa)	Naiste Meistriliiga	20	14	-	-	-	-	-	-	20	14
2005	FC Levadia Tallinn (TKSK Visa)	Naiste Meistriliiga	19	9	-	-	-	-	-	-	19	9
2006	FC Levadia Tallinn	Naiste Meistriliiga	19	15	-	-	-	-	-	-	19	15
2007	FC Levadia Tallinn	Naiste Meistriliiga	13	4	-	-	-	-	2	-	15	4
2008	FC Levadia Tallinn	Naiste Meistriliiga	20	7	-	-	3	0	-	-	23	7
2009	FC Levadia Tallinn	Naiste Meistriliiga	19	2	4	1	3	0	-	-	26	3
2010	FC Levadia Tallinn	Naiste Meistriliiga	19	2	-	-	3	0	1	1	23	3
2011	JK Tallinna Kalev	Naiste Esiliiga	2	0	-	-	-	-	-	-	2	0
2011	FC Levadia Tallinn	Naiste Meistriliiga	20	1	2	0	-	-	-	-	22	1
2012	FC Levadia Tallinn	Naiste Meistriliiga	7	1	-	-	-	-	-	-	7	1
2012	Pärnu JK	Naiste Meistriliiga	10	2	2	0	3	0	-	-	15	2
2013	Pärnu JK II	Naiste Esiliiga	4	0	-	-	-	-	-	-	4	0
2013	Pärnu JK	Naiste Meistriliiga	8	0	2	1	3	1	-	-	13	2
2014	Pärnu JK	Naiste Meistriliiga	0	-	-	-	-	-	1	0	1	0
FC Levadia Tallinn			156	55	6	1	9	0	3	1	174	57
Pärnu JK			18	2	4	1	6	1	1	0	29	3
Career total			180	57	10	2	15	1	4	1	209	61

=== International ===
As of 18 May 2014

Estonia
Year	Apps	Goals
2006	1	0
2007	0	0
2008	2	1
2009	0	0
2010	0	0
2010	0	0
2011	0	0
2012	8	0
2013	1	0
2014	3	0
Total	15	1

=== International goals ===
#	Date	Venue	Opponent	Score	Result	Competition
1	2008-07-26	Jānis Daliņš Stadium, Valmiera, Latvia	Lithuania	3 – 0	4 – 0	Woman Baltic Cup

== Honours ==
=== Club ===
FC Levadia Tallinn

- Naiste Meistriliiga: 2007, 2008, 2009
- Baltic League: 2007
- Estonian Women's Cup: 2009

Pärnu JK

- Naiste Meistriliiga: 2012, 2013, 2014
- Estonian Women's Cup: 2012, 2014
- Estonian Women's Supercup : 2013, 2014

=== International ===
- Woman U-19 Baltic Cup: 2006
- Woman Baltic Cup: 2008, 2012, 2013
