= 2018 Naiste Meistriliiga =

Estonian national championships in women's football

Naiste Meistriliiga
- Season: 2018
- Champions: Flora (1st title)
- Relegated: Ajax Tallinn
- Champions League: FC Flora
- All statistics correct as of 15 August 2019.

The 2018 Naiste Meistriliiga was the 26th season of women's league football in Estonia. The season was played between 31 March 2018 and 10 November 2018. Flora won their first Estonian league title and qualified for the Champions League.

Locations of the 2018 Naiste Meistriliiga teams

== Format ==
The eight teams played each other twice, for a total of 14 matches, with the top four teams qualifying for a championship round and the bottom four teams playing a relegation round.

== Regular season ==
Pos	Team	Pld	W	D	L	GF	GA	GD	Pts	Qualification
1	Flora	14	14	0	0	83	2	+81	42	Championship group
2	Pärnu	14	12	0	2	77	11	+66	36	Championship group
3	Levadia	14	10	0	4	50	28	+22	30	Championship group
4	Tallinna Kalev	14	5	3	6	21	26	−5	18	Championship group
5	SK 10 Premium	14	3	3	8	15	46	−31	12	Relegation group
6	Tammeka	14	2	3	9	13	58	−45	9	Relegation group
7	Ajax Tallinn	14	2	2	10	13	62	−49	8	Relegation group
8	Põlva FC Lootos	14	2	1	11	11	50	−39	7	Relegation group

Source: Soccerway

== Championship round ==
Pos	Team	Pld	W	D	L	GF	GA	GD	Pts	
1	Flora (C, Q)	20	18	1	1	107	8	+99	55	Qualification for the Champions League qualifying round
2	Pärnu	20	17	1	2	104	13	+91	52	
3	Levadia	20	10	0	10	52	55	−3	30	
4	Tallinna Kalev	20	7	3	10	28	51	−23	24	

Source: Soccerway
(C) Champions; (Q) Qualified for the phase indicated

== Relegation round ==
Pos	Team	Pld	W	D	L	GF	GA	GD	Pts	Qualification or relegation
1	SK 10 Premium	20	6	4	10	22	52	−30	22	
2	Põlva FC Lootos	20	6	1	13	21	56	−35	19	
3	Tammeka	20	5	3	12	21	65	−44	18	Relegation Playoff
4	Ajax Tallinn (R)	20	3	3	14	20	75	−55	12	Relegation to Esiliiga

Source: Soccerway
(R) Relegated

== Playoff ==
First leg

3 November 2018
15:00

Tulevik ja Suure-Jaani United	1–2	Tammeka
	Report

Viljandi linnastaadion kunstmuru, Viljandi

Second leg

10 November 2018
15:00

Tammeka	3–0	Tulevik ja Suure-Jaani United
	Report

Tartu Sepa tänava staadion, Tartu

Tammeka won 5–1 on aggregate and remain in the Naiste Meistriliiga.
