= 2017 Naiste Meistriliiga =

Estonian national championships in women's football

Naiste Meistriliiga
- Season: 2017
- Champions: Pärnu JK (13th title)
- Relegated: Noortekoondis
- Champions League: Pärnu JK
- Matches: 80
- Goals: 466 (5.83 per match)
- Top goalscorer: Lisette Tammik (33 goals)
- All statistics correct as of 29 October 2017.

The 2017 Naiste Meistriliiga was the 25th season of women's league football in Estonia.

The season was played between 1 April 2017, and 14 October 2017. The defending Champions were Pärnu JK, who successfully defended their title for the seventh year running. It is their 13th league title overall and gave them qualification to the 2018–19 UEFA Women's Champions League.

== Current clubs ==
Location of the 2017 Naiste Meistriliiga teams

The following clubs competed in the 2017 Naiste Meistriliiga season:

Club	Location	Stadium	Manager
Flora	Tallinn	Lilleküla Stadium	(Estonia) Aleksandra Ševoldajeva
Levadia	Tallinn	Maarjamäe Stadium	(Estonia) Maksim Rõtškov
Noortekoondis	Tallinn	EJL TNTK	(England) Richard Barnwell
Pärnu	Pärnu	Pärnu Rannastaadium	(Estonia) Jüri Saar
Põlva Lootos	Põlva	Lootospark	(Estonia) Kaido-Meinhard Kukli
SK 10 Premium	Tartu	Kambja Stadium	(Estonia) Mariliis Limbak
Tallinna Kalev	Tallinn	Kalev Central Stadium	(Estonia) Allan Soomets
Tammeka	Tartu	Tamme Stadium	(Estonia) Maiko Tamme

== Format ==
The 8 teams play each other twice, for a total of 14 matches, with the top four teams qualifying for a championship round and the bottom four teams playing a relegation round.

== Regular season ==
=== League table ===
Pos	Team	Pld	W	D	L	GF	GA	GD	Pts	Qualification
1	Pärnu	14	14	0	0	125	2	+123	42	Championship group
2	Flora	14	12	0	2	92	10	+82	36	Championship group
3	Levadia	14	9	0	5	47	33	+14	27	Championship group
4	SK 10 Premium	14	7	0	7	31	61	−30	21	Championship group
5	Tallinna Kalev	14	5	2	7	23	43	−20	17	Relegation group
6	Tammeka	14	3	3	8	17	38	−21	12	Relegation group
7	Põlva FC Lootos	14	3	1	10	10	67	−57	10	Relegation group
8	Noortekoondis	14	0	0	14	0	91	−91	0	Relegation group

=== Results ===
Home \ Away	10P	FLO	LEV	NOO	LOO	PÄR	TAL	TAM
SK 10 Premium		0–5	1–6	9–0	1–4	0–13	3–2	3–2
Flora	14–0		9–3	6–0	11–0	2–3	4–0	4–0
Levadia	1–4	1–6		5–0	6–1	0–5	4–0	3–1
Noortekoondis	0–2	0–20	0–7		0–0	0–14	0–2	0–1
Põlva Lootos	1–5	0–2	0–5	2–0		0–10	1–3	1–3
Pärnu	8–0	2–0	4–0	14–0	16–0		12–0	6–0
Tallinna Kalev	4–1	1–2	1–4	3–0	5–0	0–10		0–0
Tammeka	1–2	0–7	1–2	6–0	0–0	0–8	2–2	

Updated to match(es) played on 25 August 2017. Source: Soccerway
Legend: Blue = home team win; Yellow = draw; Red = away team win.
