= Estonian Female Young Footballer of the Year =

Association football award

The Estonian Female Young Footballer of the Year is an annual award given to the best Estonian female young footballer.

== Winners ==
Year	Player	Club
2008	Margarita Žernosekova	(Estonia) Pärnu
2009	Katrin Loo	(Estonia) Flora Tallinn
2010	Liis Emajõe	(Estonia) Flora Tallinn
2011	Anete Paulus	(Estonia) Pärnu
2012	Tiina Trutsi	(Estonia) Flora Tallinn
2013	Saron Läänmäe	(Estonia) Flora Tallinn
2014	Ketlin Saar	(Estonia) Pärnu
2015	Ketlin Saar	(Estonia) Pärnu
2016	Lisette Tammik	(Estonia) Flora Tallinn
2017	Ariina Mürkhain	(Estonia) Flora Tallinn
2018	Lisette Tammik	(Italy) Napoli
2019	Mari Liis Lillemäe	(Estonia) Flora Tallinn
2020	Kristiina Tullus	(Estonia) Flora Tallinn
2021	Liisa Merisalu	(Finland) FC Espoo
2022	Jaanika Volkov	(Estonia) Flora Tallinn
2023	Liisa Merisalu	(Estonia) Tammeka Tartu
2024	Liisa Merisalu	(Denmark) FC Thy-Thisted Q
2025	Katarina Elisabeth Käpa	(Poland) Medyk Konin

== See also ==
- List of sports awards honoring women
