= 2014 Naiste Meistriliiga =

Estonian national championships in women's football

Naiste Meistriliiga
- Season: 2014
- Matches: 42
- Goals: 214 (5.1 per match)
- Top goalscorer: Anastassia Morkovkina (34)

The 2014 Naiste Meistriliiga was the 22nd season of women's league football in Estonia.

The league was won by Pärnu JK, its 5th consecutive title and 10th overall. By winning, Pärnu qualified to 2015–16 UEFA Women's Champions League.

== League clubs ==
Location of the 2015 Naiste Meistriliiga teams

The following clubs are competing in Naiste Meistriliiga during the 2015 season:

Club	Location	Stadium	Manager
Flora	Tallinn	Lilleküla Stadium	(England) Richard Barnwell
Levadia	Tallinn	Maarjamäe Stadium	(Estonia) Maksim Rõtškov
Nõmme Kalju	Tallinn	Hiiu Stadium	(Brazil) Getúlio Fredo
Pärnu	Pärnu	Pärnu Raeküla Stadium	(Estonia) Jüri Saar
SK 10 Premium	Tartu	Kambja Stadium	(Estonia) Kalev Kajak
Tammeka	Tartu	Tamme Stadium	(Estonia) Aleksandra Ševoldajeva

== Format ==
The 6 teams played each other twice, for a total of ten matches. The top four teams qualified for the championship round, in which they played each other twice more, for a total of 16 matches.

== League table ==
=== Regular season ===
Pos	Team	Pld	W	D	L	GF	GA	GD	Pts	Qualification
1	Pärnu (Q)	10	10	0	0	62	6	+56	30	Qualification to championship group
2	Flora (Q)	10	6	2	2	43	13	+30	20	Qualification to championship group
3	Levadia (Q)	10	6	2	2	40	15	+25	20	Qualification to championship group
4	Tammeka (Q)	10	4	0	6	17	17	0	12	Qualification to championship group
5	SK 10 Premium	10	1	1	8	3	68	−65	4	
6	Nõmme Kalju	10	0	1	9	2	48	−46	1	

(Q) Qualified for the phase indicated

=== Championship round ===
Pos	Team	Pld	W	D	L	GF	GA	GD	Pts	Qualification
1	Pärnu (C)	16	16	0	0	84	10	+74	48	Qualification to Champions League
2	Flora	16	10	2	4	52	18	+34	32	
3	Levadia	16	8	2	6	51	32	+19	26	
4	Tammeka	16	4	0	12	22	38	−16	12	

(C) Champions
