= Estonian Women's Supercup =

Estonian women's football competition

Naiste Superkarikas
- Sport: Association football
- Founded: 2009
- No. of teams: 2
- Country: Estonia
- Most recent champion: Flora Tallinn (8th title)
- Most titles: Flora Tallinn (8 titles)
- Website: Estonian Women's Supercup

The Estonian Women's Supercup (Estonian: Eesti Naiste Superkarikas) is Estonian football's annual match contested between the champions of the previous Naiste Meistriliiga season and the holders of the Estonian Women's Cup. If the Naiste Meistriliiga champions also won the Estonian Cup then the cup runners-up provide the opposition.

The current supercup holders are Flora Tallinn.

== Matches ==
Year	Winner	Score	Runner-up	Venue
2009	Flora Tallinn	3–0	Levadia Tallinn	
2010	Flora Tallinn	4–1	Levadia Tallinn	Kalev Keskstaadion artificial turf
2011	Pärnu	2–1	Flora Tallinn	Lootospark
2012	Pärnu	5–0	Nõmme Kalju	Sportland Arena
2013	Pärnu	5–0	Levadia Tallinn	Sportland Arena
2014	Pärnu	1–1 (3–0 p)	Flora Tallinn	Sportland Arena
2015	Pärnu	5–1	Tammeka Tartu	Sportland Arena
2016	Pärnu	3–1	Flora Tallinn	Sportland Arena
2017	Pärnu	9–0	Levadia Tallinn	Sportland Arena
2018	Flora Tallinn	2–2 (3–2 p)	Pärnu	Sportland Arena
2019	Flora Tallinn	2–1	Pärnu	Sportland Arena
2020	Flora Tallinn	5–1	Tallinna Kalev	A. Le Coq Arena
2021	Tallinna Kalev	1–0	Flora Tallinn	Sportland Arena
2022	Flora Tallinn	3–0	Saku Sporting	Sportland Arena
2023	Flora Tallinn	4–2	Saku Sporting	Sportland Arena
2024	Flora Tallinn	5–0	Saku Sporting	Sportland Arena
