= Ave Pajo =

Estonian footballer

Personal information
- Full name: Ave Pajo
- Date of birth: 9 July 1984 (age 42)
- Place of birth: Rakvere, then part of Estonian SSR, Soviet Union
- Position: Striker

Team information
- Current team: Kalev Tallinn

Senior career*
Years	Team	Apps	(Gls)
2000–2001	Eesti Näitused		
2002–2004	Estel		
2005–2008	Kalev Tallinn		
2009–2010	Levadia Tallinn	47	(105)
2011–2012	Lootos Põlva	21	(21)
2013–	Kalev Tallinn	12	(7)

International career^{‡}
2000–2010	Estonia	40	(19)
- * Club domestic league appearances and goals as of 29 November 2013 ‡ National team caps and goals as of 29 November 2013

Ave Pajo (born 9 July 1984) is an Estonian football player, who plays as a striker for Naiste Meistriliiga club Kalev Tallinn.
