= Hannaliis Jaadla =

Estonian footballer

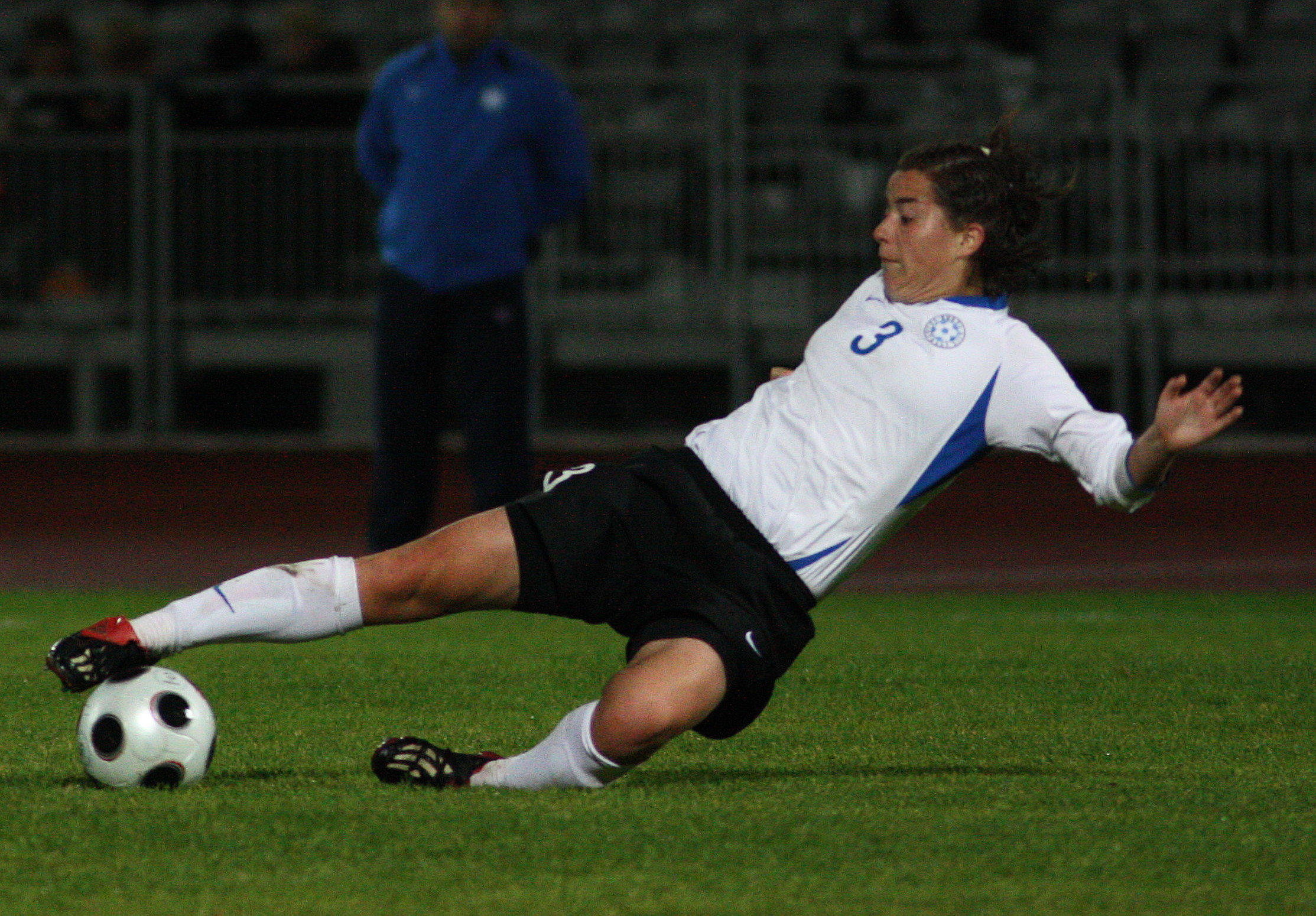
- Jaadla playing for Estonia in 2009

Personal information
- Full name: Hannaliis Jaadla
- Date of birth: 12 July 1986 (age 40)
- Place of birth: Viljandi, then part of Estonian SSR, Soviet Union
- Height: 1.75 m (5 ft 9 in)
- Position: Defender

Team information
- Current team: Oxford United
- Number: 19

Senior career*
Years	Team	Apps	(Gls)
2005–2010	Tammeka Tartu		
2009	Umeå Södra FF		
2011–2014	Flora Tallinn		
2012	→ Tottenham Hotspur (loan)		
2015–	Oxford United	5	(0)

International career
2005–2015	Estonia	66	(2)
- * Club domestic league appearances and goals as of 19:45, 7 September 2015 (UTC)

Hannaliis Jaadla (born 12 July 1986) is an Estonian footballer who plays as a defender for English club Oxford United and for the Estonia national team. As well as playing for Tammeka Tartu and Flora Tallinn of the Naiste Meistriliiga, she previously turned out for Tottenham Hotspur in England.

== Club career ==
After beginning her senior career with Tammeka Tartu, Jaadla signed for their Naiste Meistriliiga rivals Flora Tallinn in 2011. She had a brief spell with Swedish club Umeå Södra FF in 2009.

During the 2011–12 season, Estonian national team coach Keith Boanas arranged for Jaadla to join Tottenham Hotspur, coached by Karen Hills who played for Boanas at Charlton Athletic. Boanas said: "This co–operation greatly aids the development of the players and they bring new things back to Estonia that inspires other players."

She played with the St Antony's/Nuffield/Wolfson/St Cross Foxes and won the Oxford University Football Association Women's Cuppers Tournament in 2015. In March 2015 Jaadla was signed by English FA WSL 2 club Oxford United.

== International career ==
She is a member of the Estonia women's national football team.

== Personal life ==
In addition to her football career, Jaadla is a historian and academic. Her research has focused on infant mortality in 19th century Tartu.
