= Anett Vilipuu =

Estonian footballer

Personal information
- Full name: Anett Vilipuu
- Date of birth: 25 September 1996 (age 30)
- Place of birth: Estonia
- Positions: Defender; midfielder

Youth career
- Nõmme Kalju

Senior career*
Years	Team	Apps	(Gls)
2012	Noortekoondis		
2013–2019	Levadia Tallinn		
2019-2022	Flora		
2024-2025	Tallinna Kalev	40	(13)
2025-	Harju JK Laagri	1	(0)

International career^{‡}
2013–	Estonia	8	(1)
- * Club domestic league appearances and goals as of 19 April 2026 ‡ National team caps and goals as of 8 October 2025

Anett Vilipuu (born 25 September 1996) is an Estonian football player who plays for Harju JK Laagri, as a midfielder.
