= Sirje Kapper =

Estonian footballer

Personal information
- Full name: Sirje Kapper
- Date of birth: 2 October 1992 (age 34)
- Place of birth: Maaritsa, Estonia
- Position: Defender

Team information
- Current team: Tammeka (manager); Estonia (manager)

Youth career
- 2005–2009: Tammeka

Senior career*
Years	Team	Apps	(Gls)
2012–2015	Tammeka II	8	(2)
2007–2018	Tammeka	208	(17)

International career
2007–2008	Estonia U17	11	(0)
2009–2010	Estonia U19	11	(0)
2014–2016	Estonia	15	(0)

Managerial career
- 2019–: Tammeka
- 2022: Estonia
- * Club domestic league appearances and goals

Sirje Kapper (née Roops; born 2 October 1992) is an Estonian football manager and former player who is the manager of Naiste Meistriliiga club Tammeka.
