= Margarita Matjuhhova =

Estonian footballer

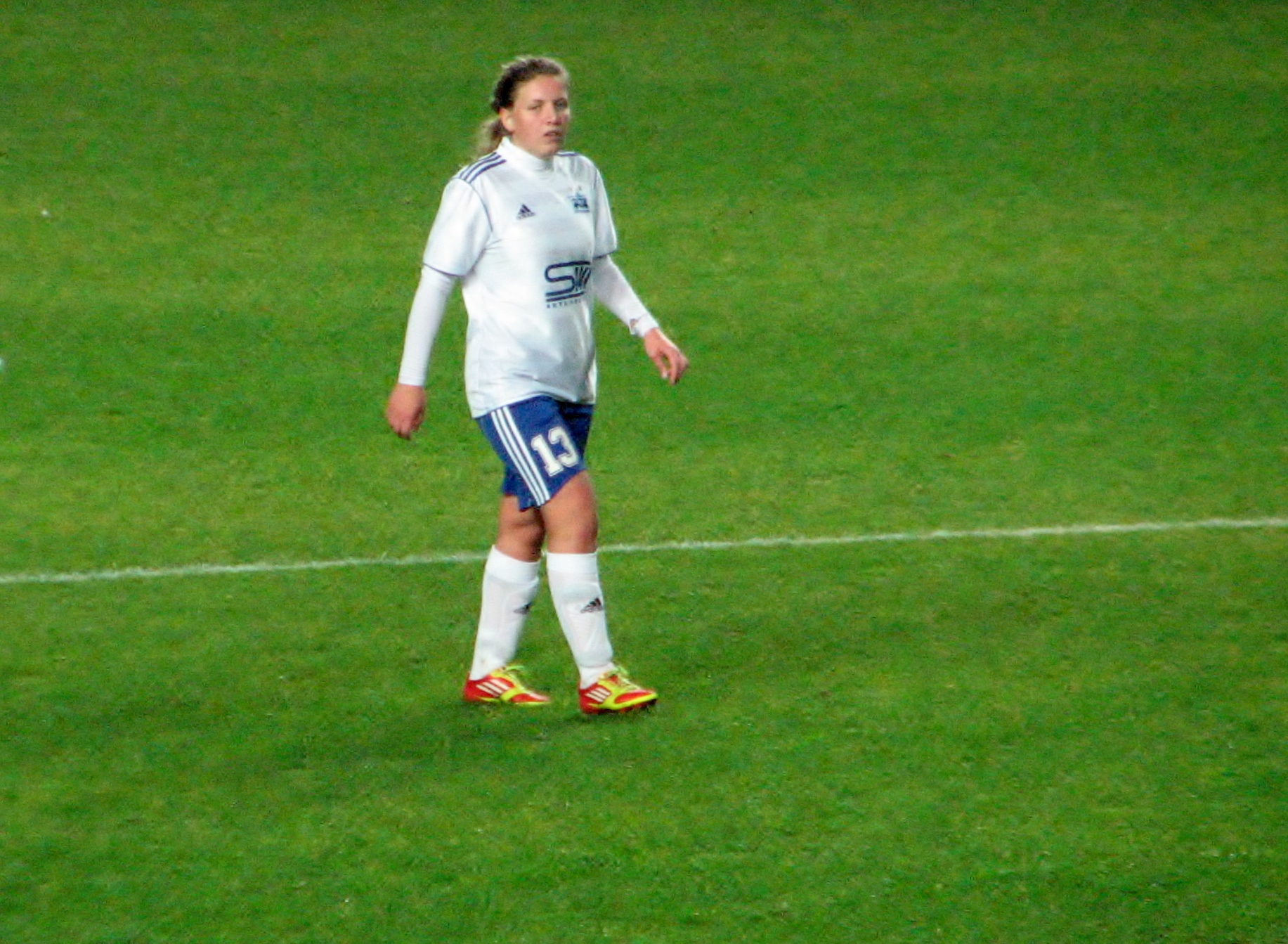

Personal information
- Full name: Margarita Matjuhhova
- Date of birth: 29 January 1988 (age 38)
- Position: Striker

Senior career*
Years	Team	Apps	(Gls)
2004–2009	Pärnu		
2010–2011	Levadia		
2012–	Pärnu		

International career
2006–2013	Estonia	33	(5)
- * Club domestic league appearances and goals

Margarita Matjuhhova (née Žernosekova; born 29 January 1988) is an Estonian football striker currently playing for Pärnu JK in the Meistriliiga. She has also played for Levadia Tallinn, taking part in the Champions League with both teams. In 2008, she was named Estonian Young Footballer of the Year.

She is a member of the Estonian national team. She has also played for Levadia Tallinn, taking part in the Champions League with both teams.
