= Evelyn Šilina =

Estonian footballer

Personal information
- Date of birth: 5 April 2001 (age 25)
- Place of birth: Tallinn, Estonia
- Position: Defender

Team information
- Current team: Tallinna Kalev
- Number: 13

Senior career*
| Years | Team | Apps | (Gls) |
- Parnu JK Poseidon
| 2017 | Tallinna SK Legion | | |
| 2018-2019 | Parnu JK Poseidon | | |
| 2020-2021 | Tallinna Kalev | | |
| 2024-2025 | Tabasalu | 47 | (14) |

International career^{‡}
| 2016 | Estonia U-17 | 14 | (3) |
| 2018–2019 | Estonia U-19 | 16 | (1) |
| 2020– | Estonia | 9 | (0) |
- * Club domestic league appearances and goals as of 19 April 2026 ‡ National team caps and goals as of 19 April 2026

Evelyn Šilina (born 5 April 2001) is an Estonian footballer who plays as a defender for Tallinna Kalev and the Estonia women's national team.

== Career ==
She made her debut for the Estonia national team on 6 March 2020 against Wales, coming on as a substitute for Lisette Tammik.
