= Anete Paulus =

Estonian footballer

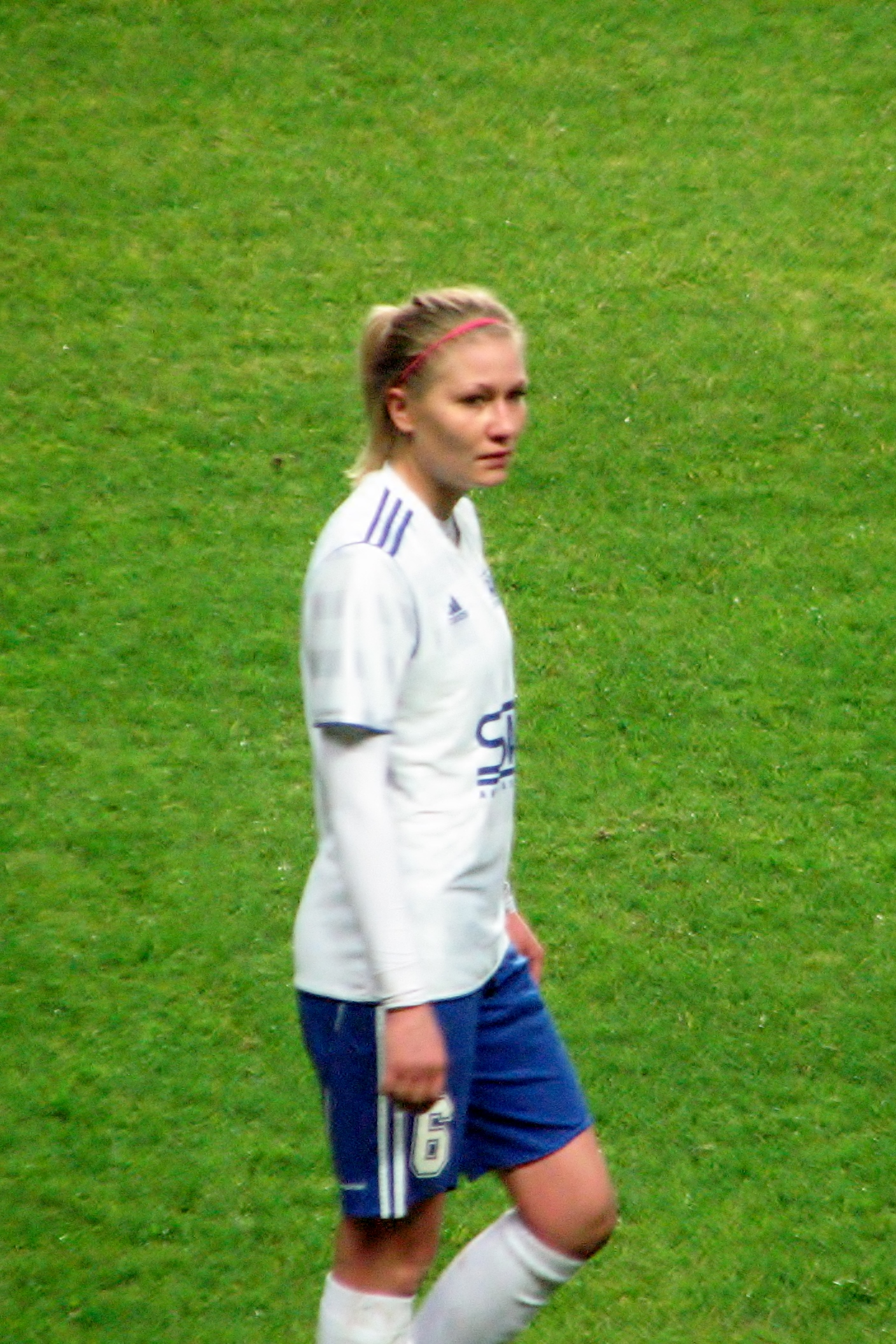
- Paulus with Pärnu in 2013

Personal information
- Full name: Anete Paulus
- Date of birth: 27 September 1991 (age 35)
- Place of birth: Tallinn, Estonia
- Position: Defender

Team information
- Current team: Pärnu
- Number: 6

Youth career
- 2004: Pärnu
- 2005–2007: Piraaja
- 2008–2009: Pärnu

Senior career*
Years	Team	Apps	(Gls)
2005–2006	Piraaja	37	(0)
2007	EVL United	14	(0)
2008–2014	Pärnu II	12	(2)
2008–	Pärnu	165	(36)

International career
2007	Estonia U17	3	(0)
2009	Estonia U19	6	(0)
2008–2017	Estonia	46	(1)
- * Club domestic league appearances and goals as of 31 December 2017

Anete Paulus (born 27 September 1991) is an Estonian football player who plays as a defender for Naiste Meistriliiga club Pärnu. She represented the Estonia national team from 2008 to 2017.
