= Katrin Loo =

Estonian footballer (born 1991)

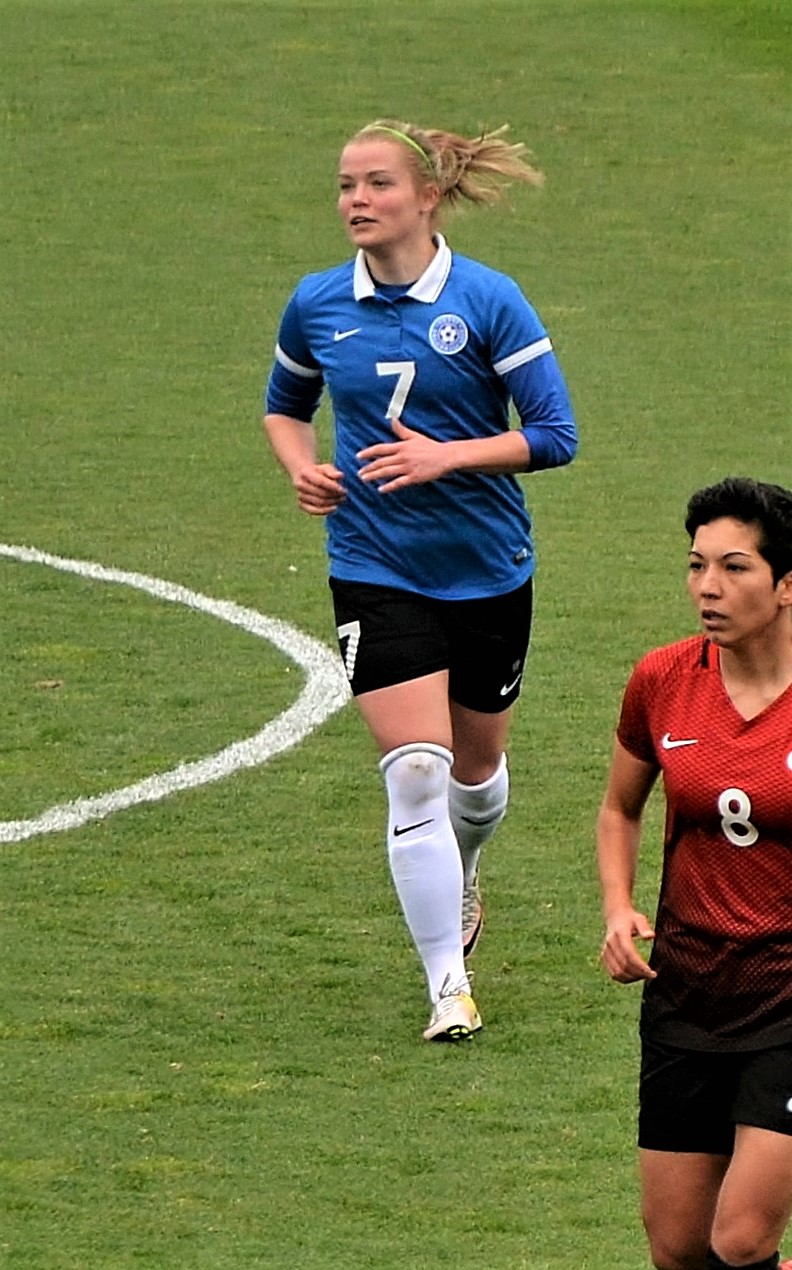
- Katrin Loo playing for Estonia national in 2018.

Personal information
- Full name: Katrin Loo
- Date of birth: 2 January 1991 (age 35)
- Place of birth: Tallinn, Estonia
- Height: 1.63 m (5 ft 4 in)
- Position: Striker

Team information
- Current team: Flora
- Number: 6

College career
Years	Team	Apps	(Gls)
2011	Dayton Flyers	9	(1)

Senior career*
Years	Team	Apps	(Gls)
2005–2013	Flora Tallinn	129	(211)
2013–2014	NiceFutis	34	(4)
2015	Merilappi United	5	(1)
2016-2020	Flora		

International career^{‡}
2009	Estonia U19	5	(1)
2007–2020	Estonia	114	(20)
- * Club domestic league appearances and goals as of 14 May 2015 ‡ National team caps and goals as of 23 October 2020

Katrin Loo (born 2 January 1991) is a retired Estonian footballer who played as a forward for Naiste Meistriliiga club FC Flora and the Estonia women's national team.

== Career ==
Loo made her debut for the Estonian national team as soon as May 2007, in a friendly match against Latvia. In club competitions, she started her career playing for Flora Tallinn in Estonia's Meistriliiga before transferring in 2011 to Dayton Flyers in the NCAA. She subsequently moved to Finland's Naisten Liiga, playing first for NiceFutis and later for Merilappi United.

=== International goals ===
Goals for the Estonian WNT in official competitions
Competition	Stage	Date	Location	Opponent	Goals	Result	Overall
2013 UEFA Euro	Qualifiers	2011–10–26	Senec	Slovakia	1	1–3	1
2015 FIFA World Cup	Qualifiers	2013–09–20	Tallinn	Italy	1	1–5	3
2015 FIFA World Cup	Qualifiers	2013–10–30	Strumica	North Macedonia	1	2–0	3
2015 FIFA World Cup	Qualifiers	2014–06–15	Strumica	North Macedonia	1	1–1	3

== Titles ==
- 2 Estonian Cups (2007, 2008)
