= Estonian Women's Cup =

Estonian women's football competition

Naiste karikavõistlused
- Founded: 2007
- Region: Estonia
- Current champions: Flora (9th title)
- Most championships: Flora (9 titles)
- Website: Official website

The Estonian Women's Cup (Estonian: Eesti naiste karikavõistlused) is the national women's football cup competition in Estonia. It was first held in 2007.

The record for the most wins is held by the current cup holders Flora with eight victories.

== Format ==
Teams from the first two tiers of women's football are able to enter the cup. Teams from the Naiste Meistriliiga enter the cup only in the third round, which equals the round of 16.

== Finals ==
Season	Winners	Score	Runners-up	Venue
2007	Flora	4–1	Levadia	Pärnu Kalevi Stadium
2008	Flora	3–1	Pärnu	Kohila Stadium
2009	Levadia	2–1	Flora	Kadriorg Stadium
2010	Pärnu	1–0	Flora	A. Le Coq Arena
2011	Pärnu	7–0	Nõmme Kalju	Viljandi linnastaadion
2012	Pärnu	4–0	Levadia	A. Le Coq Arena
2013	Flora	2–0	Pärnu	A. Le Coq Arena
2014	Pärnu	5–1	Tammeka	A. Le Coq Arena
2015	Pärnu	11–0	Lootos	A. Le Coq Arena
2016	Levadia	4–0	SK 10 Premium	A. Le Coq Arena
2017	Pärnu	8–0	Tallinna Kalev	A. Le Coq Arena
2018	Flora	7–0	SK 10 Premium	A. Le Coq Arena
2019	Flora	4–0	Pärnu	A. Le Coq Arena
2020	Flora	6–0	Tallinna Kalev	A. Le Coq Arena
2021	Flora	3–0	Pärnu Vaprus	A. Le Coq Arena
2022	Flora	7–1	Tallinna Kalev	A. Le Coq Arena
2023	Saku Sporting	1–0	Tammeka	A. Le Coq Arena
2024	Flora	2–0	Tabasalu	A. Le Coq Arena

== See also ==
- Estonian Women's Supercup
- Estonian Cup (men's edition)
