= Saku Sporting =

Estonian football club

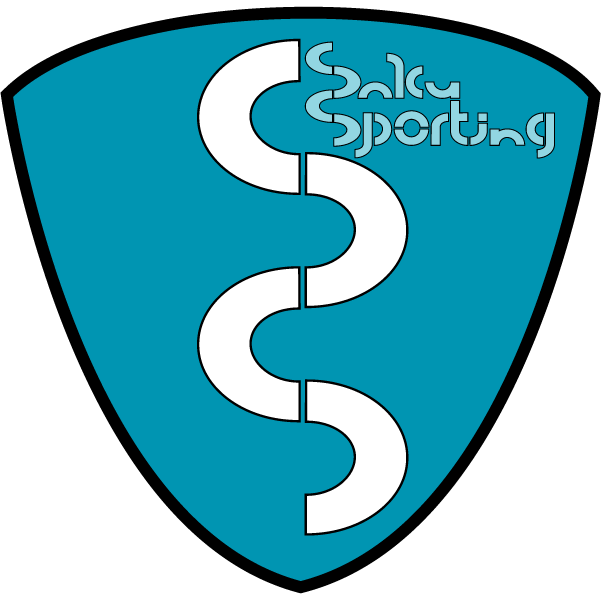
- Founded: 2007
- Ground: Saku staadion, Saku Parish
- Capacity: 1,000
- Manager: Merily Toom
- League: Naiste Meistriliiga
- 2025: 2nd
- Website: https://www.sakusporting.ee/
Home colours	Away colours

Saku Sporting is an Estonian sports club in Saku Parish with women's, men's and youth association football teams. The women's team currently plays in Naiste Meistriliiga, the first level in the Estonian women's football system. The men's team plays in III liiga.

== History ==
The club was founded in 2007. In the beginning they worked with children and youngsters and in 2011 founded a senior team. Later, founded a women's team.

In 2021, the ladies took second place in the national championship for the first time. They were able to repeat this in the 2022, 2023, 2024, and 2025 seasons.

In 2023, Sporting won the Estonian Women's Cup, defeating Tartu Tammeka in the final by a score of 1-0.

== Players ==
=== Current squad ===
As of 1 September 2025

Note: Flags indicate national team as defined under FIFA eligibility rules; some limited exceptions apply. Players may hold more than one non-FIFA nationality.

No.	Pos.	Nation	Player
2	DF	EST	Viktoria Toding
4	MF	EST	Grete Daut
5	GK	EST	Cärolyn Eismann
6	DF	EST	Eliisabet Pedak
7	DF	EST	Anna Mariin Juksar
8	FW	EST	Grete Gross
9	DF	EST	Sanna Lindeberg
10	FW	EST	Katriin Saulus
11	MF	EST	Eliise Gertrud Põlluvee
12	GK	EST	Ksenija Jerofejeva
14	MF	EST	Ruth Hansar
15	FW	EST	Gerda Guštšin

No.	Pos.	Nation	Player
16	FW	EST	Katrin Tiigimägi
17	DF	EST	Angela Raidmets
19	FW	EST	Emma Treiberg
20	MF	EST	Valeria Liik
21	MF	EST	Rahel Pedak
22	DF	EST	Liisi Mäesalu
26	MF	EST	Triin Satsi
30	FW	EST	Lisandra Rannasto
36	DF	EST	Kadri Liis Lätte
38	FW	EST	Laura Lisett Aedla
—		EST	Diana Salamatova

== Personnel ==
=== Current technical staff ===
Position	Name
Manager	(Estonia) Merily Toom
Assistant manager	(Estonia) Lizette Tarlap
