= Emma Treiberg =

Estonian footballer

Personal information
- Date of birth: 19 November 2000 (age 25)
- Place of birth: Tallinn, Estonia
- Position: Forward

Team information
- Current team: Saku Sporting
- Number: 19

Senior career*
Years	Team	Apps	(Gls)
- Audentes / Noortekoondis
2015	Ajax Lasnamäe		
- Nomme Kalju
2016-2021	Tallinna Kalev		
2024	IFK Kalmar		
2025-	Saku Sporting	23	(17)

International career^{‡}
2015–2016	Estonia U-17	7	(0)
2017–2018	Estonia U-19	14	(0)
2019–	Estonia	43	(4)
- * Club domestic league appearances and goals as of 14 April 2026 ‡ National team caps and goals as of 13 April 2026

Emma Treiberg (born 19 November 2000) is an Estonian footballer who plays as a forward for Saku Sporting and the Estonia women's national team.

== Career ==
She made her debut for the Estonia national team on 27 February 2019 against Malta, coming on as a substitute for Gerli Israel.

== International goals ==
No.	Date	Venue	Opponent	Score	Result	Competition
1.	27 October 2023	Vazgen Sargsyan Republican Stadium, Yerevan, Armenia	Armenia	4–0	4–1	2023–24 UEFA Women's Nations League
2.	31 October 2023	Lilleküla Stadium, Tallinn, Estonia	Armenia	2–0	5–1	2023–24 UEFA Women's Nations League
3.	31 October 2023	Lilleküla Stadium, Tallinn, Estonia	Armenia	3–0	5–1	2023–24 UEFA Women's Nations League
4.	27 October 2025	Raudondvaris Stadium, Raudondvaris, Lithuania	Faroe Islands	1–0	2–0	2025 Baltic Women's Cup
