= Anastassia Morkovkina =

Estonian footballer and manager

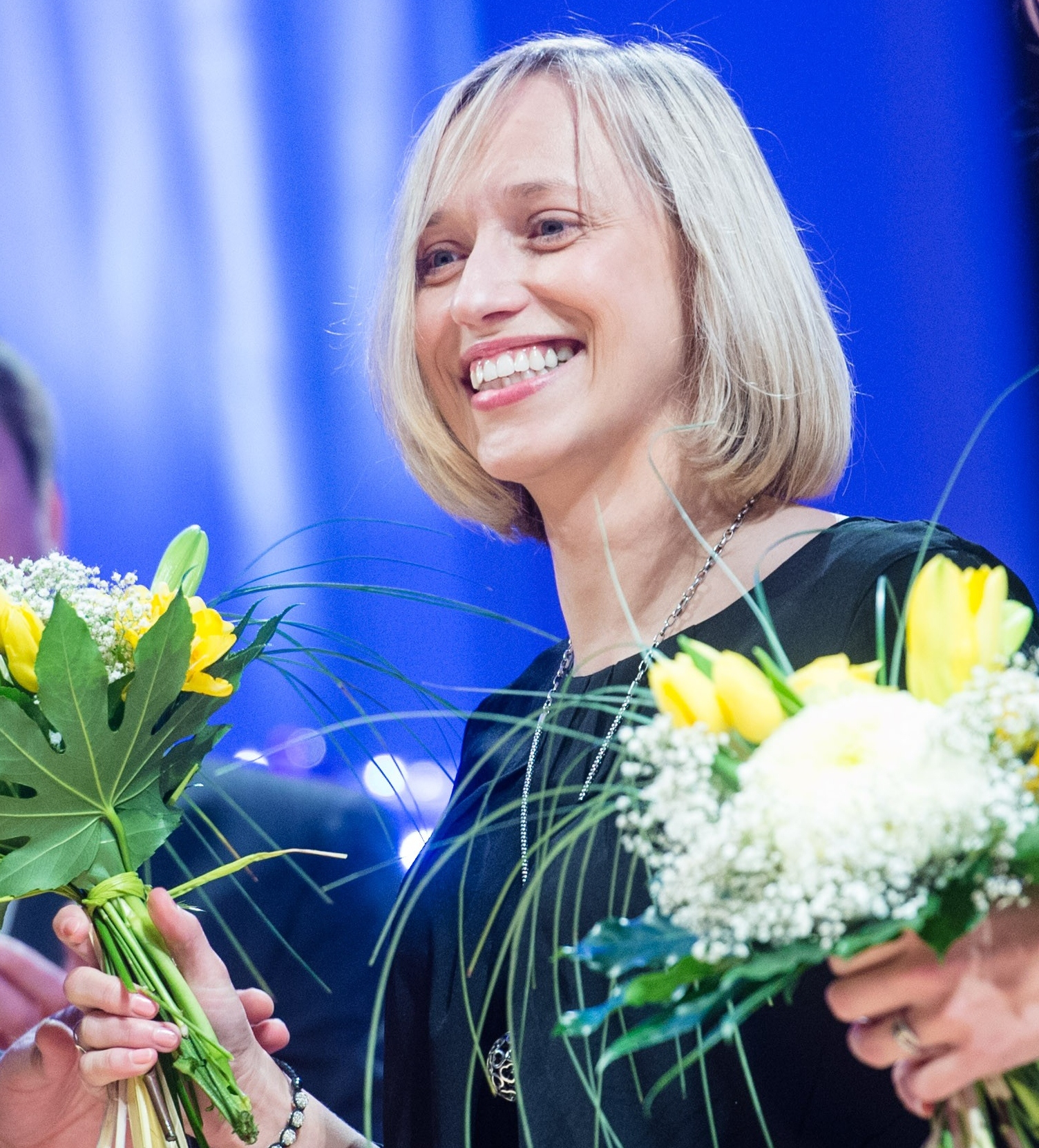
- Anastassia Morkovkina in 2012

Personal information
- Full name: Anastassia Morkovkina
- Date of birth: 6 April 1981 (age 45)
- Place of birth: Narva, then part of Estonian SSR, Soviet Union
- Height: 1.71 m (5 ft 7 1/2 in)
- Position: Striker

Team information
- Current team: Viimsi JK (manager)

Senior career*
| Years | Team | Apps | (Gls) |
| 1995–1996 | Narvane | ? | (11) |
| 1996–1999 | TKSK | 43 | (117) |
| 2000–2017 | Pärnu | 289 | (645) |
| Total | | 332+ | (773) |

International career
| 1997–2015 | Estonia | 75 | (40) |

Managerial career
- 2018-?: Pärnu
- Viimsi JK
- 2022–2024: Estonia
- 2025-: Viimsi JK
- * Club domestic league appearances and goals

Anastassia Morkovkina (born 6 April 1981) is an Estonian football manager and former professional player. She is currently the manager of the Naiste Meistriliiga club Viimsi JK.

Morkovkina played as a striker for JK Narvane Narva, TKSK and Pärnu JK in the Meistriliiga. She has been named Estonian Female Footballer of the Year in 1996–97, 2000, 2002, 2003, 2004, 2005, 2009, 2010.

She was a member of the Estonian national team since 1997 to 2015, and served as its captain. She leads the team's statistics in scoring.

Morkovkina is the Naiste Meistriliiga all-time top scorer with 773 goals.

== Career statistics ==
=== Club ===
Appearances and goals by club, season, and competition. Only official games are included in this table.
| Club | Season | League | | Cup | | Europe | | Total | |
| Club | Season | Apps | Goals | Apps | Goals | Apps | Goals | Apps | Goals |
|---|---|---|---|---|---|---|---|---|---|
| Narvane | 1995-96 | 1+ | 10 | 0 | 0 | 0 | 0 | 1+ | 10 |
| Narvane | 1996-97 | 1+ | 1 | 0 | 0 | 0 | 0 | 1+ | 1 |
| TKSK Arsenal | 1997 | 10 | 23 | 0 | 0 | 0 | 0 | 10 | 23 |
| TKSK Arsenal | 1998 | 17 | 52 | 0 | 0 | 0 | 0 | 17 | 52 |
| TKSK Arsenal | 1999 | 16 | 28 | 0 | 0 | 0 | 0 | 16 | 28 |
| Pärnu | 2000 | 16 | 28 | 0 | 0 | 0 | 0 | 16 | 28 |
| Pärnu | 2001 | 13 | 11 | 0 | 0 | 0 | 0 | 13 | 11 |
| Pärnu | 2002 | 17 | 25 | 0 | 0 | 0 | 0 | 17 | 25 |
| Pärnu | 2003 | 20 | 44 | 0 | 0 | 0 | 0 | 20 | 44 |
| Pärnu | 2004 | 20 | 58 | 0 | 0 | 0 | 0 | 20 | 58 |
| Pärnu | 2005 | 20 | 63 | 0 | 0 | 0 | 0 | 20 | 63 |
| Pärnu | 2006 | 18 | 61 | 0 | 0 | 0 | 0 | 18 | 61 |
| Pärnu | 2007 | 10 | 16 | 0 | 0 | 0 | 0 | 10 | 16 |
| Pärnu | 2008 | 19 | 27 | 0 | 0 | 0 | 0 | 19 | 27 |
| Pärnu | 2009 | 24 | 54 | 2 | 1 | 0 | 0 | 26 | 55 |
| Pärnu | 2010 | 22 | 35 | 3 | 3 | 0 | 0 | 25 | 38 |
| Pärnu | 2011 | 22 | 40 | 4 | 9 | 0 | 0 | 26 | 49 |
| Pärnu | 2012 | 20 | 39 | 4 | 6 | 0 | 0 | 24 | 45 |
| Pärnu | 2013 | 17 | 34 | 3 | 3 | 0 | 0 | 20 | 37 |
| Pärnu | 2014 | 17 | 35 | 4 | 5 | 0 | 0 | 21 | 39 |
| Pärnu | 2015 | 22 | 36 | 4 | 6 | 0 | 0 | 26 | 42 |
| Pärnu | 2016 | 20 | 35 | 2 | 1 | 0 | 0 | 22 | 36 |
| Pärnu | 2017 | 21 | 19 | 4 | 4 | 4 | 5 (Note: Baltic League) | 29 | 28 |
| Pärnu | Total | 383+ | 773 | 30 | 38 | 4 | 5 | 417+ | 816 |

== International goals ==
| No. | Date | Venue | Opponent | Score | Result | Competition |
|---|---|---|---|---|---|---|
| 1. | 16 August 1997 | Vilnius, Lithuania | Lithuania | 1–2 | 2–3 | 1999 FIFA Women's World Cup qualification |
| 2. | 24 August 1997 | Tallinn, Estonia | Australia | 1–0 | 1–5 | Friendly |
| 3. | 27 June 1998 | Tallinn, Estonia | Lithuania | 1–0 | 3–0 | 1999 FIFA Women's World Cup qualification |
| 4. | 27 June 1998 | Tallinn, Estonia | Lithuania | 3–0 | 3–0 | 1999 FIFA Women's World Cup qualification |
| 5. | 16 September 1999 | Valga, Estonia | Romania | 1–5 | 2–6 | UEFA Women's Euro 2001 qualifying |
| 6. | 16 September 1999 | Valga, Estonia | Romania | 2–6 | 2–6 | UEFA Women's Euro 2001 qualifying |
| 7. | 27 June 2000 | Tallinn, Estonia | Israel | 1–1 | 2–1 | UEFA Women's Euro 2001 qualifying |
| 8. | 29 August 2000 | Žiar nad Hronom, Slovakia | Slovakia | 1–3 | 1–3 | UEFA Women's Euro 2001 qualifying |
| 9. | 6 September 2001 | Tallinn, Estonia | Israel | 2–5 | 2–5 | 2003 FIFA Women's World Cup qualification |
| 10. | 24 August 2003 | Pärnu, Estonia | Kazakhstan | 1–1 | 3–2 | UEFA Women's Euro 2005 qualifying |
| 11. | 24 August 2003 | Pärnu, Estonia | Kazakhstan | 2–1 | 3–2 | UEFA Women's Euro 2005 qualifying |
| 12. | 29 August 2004 | Pärnu, Estonia | Belarus | 1–3 | 1–3 | UEFA Women's Euro 2005 qualifying |
| 13. | 12 August 2005 | Pärnu, Estonia | Israel | 1–1 | 2–5 | 2007 FIFA Women's World Cup qualification |
| 14. | 12 August 2005 | Pärnu, Estonia | Israel | 2–2 | 2–5 | 2007 FIFA Women's World Cup qualification |
| 15. | 24 September 2005 | Chișinău, Moldova | Moldova | 1–2 | 1–3 | 2007 FIFA Women's World Cup qualification |
| 16. | 18 June 2006 | Valga, Estonia | Moldova | 3–0 | 3–2 | 2007 FIFA Women's World Cup qualification |
| 17. | 27 March 2010 | Vrbovec, Croatia | Croatia | 2–0 | 3–0 | 2011 FIFA Women's World Cup qualification |
| 18. | 5 June 2010 | Rakvere, Estonia | Northern Ireland | 1–0 | 2–1 | 2011 FIFA Women's World Cup qualification |

== Honours ==
=== Player ===
- TKSK
  - Estonian Top Division: 1997–98, 1998, 1999
- Pärnu JK
  - Estonian Top Division: 2003, 2004, 2005, 2006, 2010, 2011, 2012, 2013, 2014, 2015, 2016, 2017
    - Runners Up: 2002, 2007, 2008
  - Estonian Cup: 2010, 2011, 2012, 2014, 2015, 2017
    - Runners Up: 2008, 2013
  - Estonian Women's Supercup: 2011, 2012, 2013, 2014, 2015, 2016, 2017

=== Individual ===
- Estonian Female Footballer of the Year: 1996–97, 2000, 2002, 2003, 2004, 2005, 2009, 2010
- Naiste Meistriliiga top goalscorer: 1996–97, 1997–98, 1998, 2000, 2003, 2004, 2005, 2006, 2011, 2012, 2013, 2014, 2015, 2016
- Naiste Meistriliiga Player of the Year: 2012, 2015, 2016
