= FC Lootos Põlva (women) =

Estonian association football team

Põlva FC Lootos
- Full name: Põlva Jalgpalliklubi Lootos
- Nickname: "allegros"
- Founded: 1 April 2008; 18 years ago
- Ground: Lootospark, Põlva
- Chairman: Annika Aust
- Manager: Indrek Käo
- League: Naiste Esiliiga
- 2025: 2th
- Website: https://www.fclootos.ee
Home colours	Away colours

FCL Lootos is an Estonian women's association football club from Põlva. The club plays in Naiste Esiliiga, the second tier in the Estonian women's football system.

== History ==
The team was founded in 2008. FC Lootos only had girls team (under 16 age group), so when girls reached the age of 16, they were forced to leave the club. This new team took the name Põlva F.C. Lootos and played their home games at Lootospark, located in Põlva. It took just one season to gain promotion to the Naiste Meistriliiga, when the club won the Naiste Esiliiga in 2008 under the management of Kaido Kukli and Indrek Käo. From 2009, team played five seasons in Naiste Meistriliiga. After finishing 5th in 2013, club's top goal scoring forward Signy Aarna left the club to play professional football at Finnish team Pallokissat. Club started program for changing players generation and left Meistriliiga. Once more it took just one season to gain promotion to the Naiste Esiliiga, when the club won the Naiste Teine liiga in the 2014. Season 2015 was most successful ever when club reached the final of the Estonian Cups (Estonian: Eesti naiste karikavõistlused) after a 2–1 semi-final win over Levadia at the Lootospark. Allegros were beaten 11–0 by current cup holders Pärnu in the final at the A Le Coq Arena in Tallinn. Team went on to win 2nd place the 2016 Naiste Esiliiga and automatic promotion to the Naiste Meistriliiga, ending their three-year stint in the lower divisions. On the season 2017 team was finishing on the 7th place and 1-1, 0-0 draws against Nõmme Kalju FC on the promotional round secured place on Naiste Meistriliiga for another season. Season 2018 started with Lootos suffering one of the worst results in their history. Losing at first their homeground Lootospark (not qualified for high level football standards) team played first seven games on away grounds and lose all of them. New home ground Tilsi staadion (13 km (8.1 mi) out of Põlva) helps team a lot to secure place on Naiste Meistriliiga for clubs 25th anniversary season 2019 and end the season in 6th place. In the difficult 2020 season the team finished with highest 5th places in the Naiste Meistriliiga. The 1st place was won in the Fair Play competition. For the first time in club history, the team were voted the best team in Põlva County. In 2021, the team repeated its result, finishing fifth in the Naiste Meistriliiga. Team was relegated from Naiste Meistriliiga on the end of season 2024 and long serving head coach Kaido-Meinhard Kukli was retired. Team started play on Esiliiga with new head coach Indrek Käo on the season 2025.

== Current technical staff ==
Staff

Position	Name
Head coach	(Estonia) Indrek Käo
Assistant Coach	(Estonia) Kert Preeden
Physiotherapeut	(Estonia) Iris Nurmsoo

== Current squad ==
As of 25 April 2025.

Note: Flags indicate national team as defined under FIFA eligibility rules; some limited exceptions apply. Players may hold more than one non-FIFA nationality.

No.	Pos.	Nation	Player
2	DF	EST	Raneli Piirisild
3	DF	EST	Elina Kahar
5	DF	EST	Krisete Külm
7	DF	EST	Ave-Lii Laas (captain)
9	MF	EST	Anette Laureen Linnuste
14	DF	EST	Isabel Huma (vice-captain)
17	FW	EST	Kätriin Altsaar
19	GK	EST	Mairit Laanesaar
20	MF	EST	Kristin Kukli (vice-captain)

No.	Pos.	Nation	Player
23	MF	EST	Indra-Liz Nemvalts
25	MF	EST	Glairika Toomemägi
27	MF	EST	Luiisa Marleen Lepp
32	DF	EST	Ketlin Pindis
33	MF	EST	Marie Rahel Lail (vice-captain)
33	FW	EST	Keidi Käär
91	FW	EST	Gerlin Zoludev
98	GK	EST	Hanna Lisete Sellis

== Reserve team ==
As of 31 October 2025.

Note: Flags indicate national team as defined under FIFA eligibility rules; some limited exceptions apply. Players may hold more than one non-FIFA nationality.

No.	Pos.	Nation	Player
4	FW	EST	Säde Lillo
5	DF	EST	Krisete Külm
7	MF	EST	Eleanor Lutsar
10	MF	EST	Helena Hioväin
11	DF	EST	Britt-Marii Vija
12	FW	EST	Anette Oidekivi
15	DF	EST	Mari Nagel
16	DF	EST	Kairi Tobreluts
17	MF	EST	Marie Viese

No.	Pos.	Nation	Player
19	MF	EST	Ly Anette Musting
21	MF	EST	Ronja Pastak
22	MF	EST	Ingrid Schmeimann
28	DF	EST	Marianne Madalvee
30	DF	EST	Miialii Rinne
36	MF	EST	Kirke Lepp
54	DF	EST	Madli Eskla
77	FW	EST	Virginia Käst

=== Out on loan ===
Note: Flags indicate national team as defined under FIFA eligibility rules; some limited exceptions apply. Players may hold more than one non-FIFA nationality.

No.	Pos.	Nation	Player.

== Season by season ==
Season	League	Position	Estonian Women's Cup	Top GoalScorer
Põlva F.C. Lootos
2008	Naiste Esiliiga	1st of 10 (promoted)	1/8 final	Signy Aarna – 48 goals
2009	Naiste Meistriliiga	4th of 8	Semi-final	Signy Aarna – 10 goals
2010	Naiste Meistriliiga	4th of 6	Semi-final	Signy Aarna – 14 goals
2011	Naiste Meistriliiga	4th of 6	1/4 final	Signy Aarna – 22 goals
2012	Naiste Meistriliiga	5th of 7	Semi-final	Signy Aarna – 28 goals
2013	Naiste Meistriliiga	5th of 7	Semi-final	Signy Aarna – 30 goals
2014	Naiste Teine liiga	1st of 9 (promoted)	Runners-up	Raili Pärt – 23 goals
2015	Naiste Esiliiga	3rd of 7	Semi-Final	Raili Pärt – 10 goals
2016	Naiste Esiliiga	2nd of 8 (promoted)	1/4 final	Liisa Merisalu – 27 goals
2017	Naiste Meistriliiga	7th of 8	1/8 final	Sandra London, Ave-Lii Laas – 6 goals
2018	Naiste Meistriliiga	6th of 8	1/8 final	Kärt Hüdsi – 11 goals
2019	Naiste Meistriliiga	7th of 8	1/16 final	Kärt Hüdsi – 8 goals
2020	Naiste Meistriliiga	5th of 8	1/4 final	Kärt Hüdsi – 13 goals
2021	Naiste Meistriliiga	5th of 8	1/4 final	Ave-Lii Laas – 11 goals
2022	Naiste Meistriliiga	7th of 8	1/8 final	Kärt Hüdsi – 9 goals
2023	Naiste Meistriliiga	7th of 8	Semi-final	Kärt Hüdsi – 11 goals
2024	Naiste Meistriliiga	8th of 8 (relegated)	1/8 final	Kärt Hüdsi – 9 goals
2025	Naiste Esiliiga	2nd of 6 (not promoted)	1/8 final	Kätriin Altsaar – 9 goals
