= Pärnu JK =

Estonian football club

Pärnu
- Full name: Pärnu Jalgpalliklubi
- Founded: 21 July 1989
- Dissolved: 12 January 2020
- Ground: Pärnu Rannastaadion
- Capacity: 1,501
- Manager: Anastassia Morkovkina; Kristina Bannikova
- League: Naiste Meistriliiga
- 2017: 1st
- Website: http://www.parnujk.ee
Home colours

Pärnu Jalgpalliklubi, commonly known as PJK, or simply as Pärnu, was a women's football team based in Pärnu, Estonia. Having won a record 13 Naiste Meistriliiga titles, 6 Estonian Women's Cups and 7 Estonian Women's Supercups, the team stepped down from women's football in 2019. The club's home ground was Pärnu Rannastaadion.

The club announced their dissolvement at the end of December 2019 and played their last game on 12 January 2020.

The club's men's team currently plays in the third division Esiliiga B.

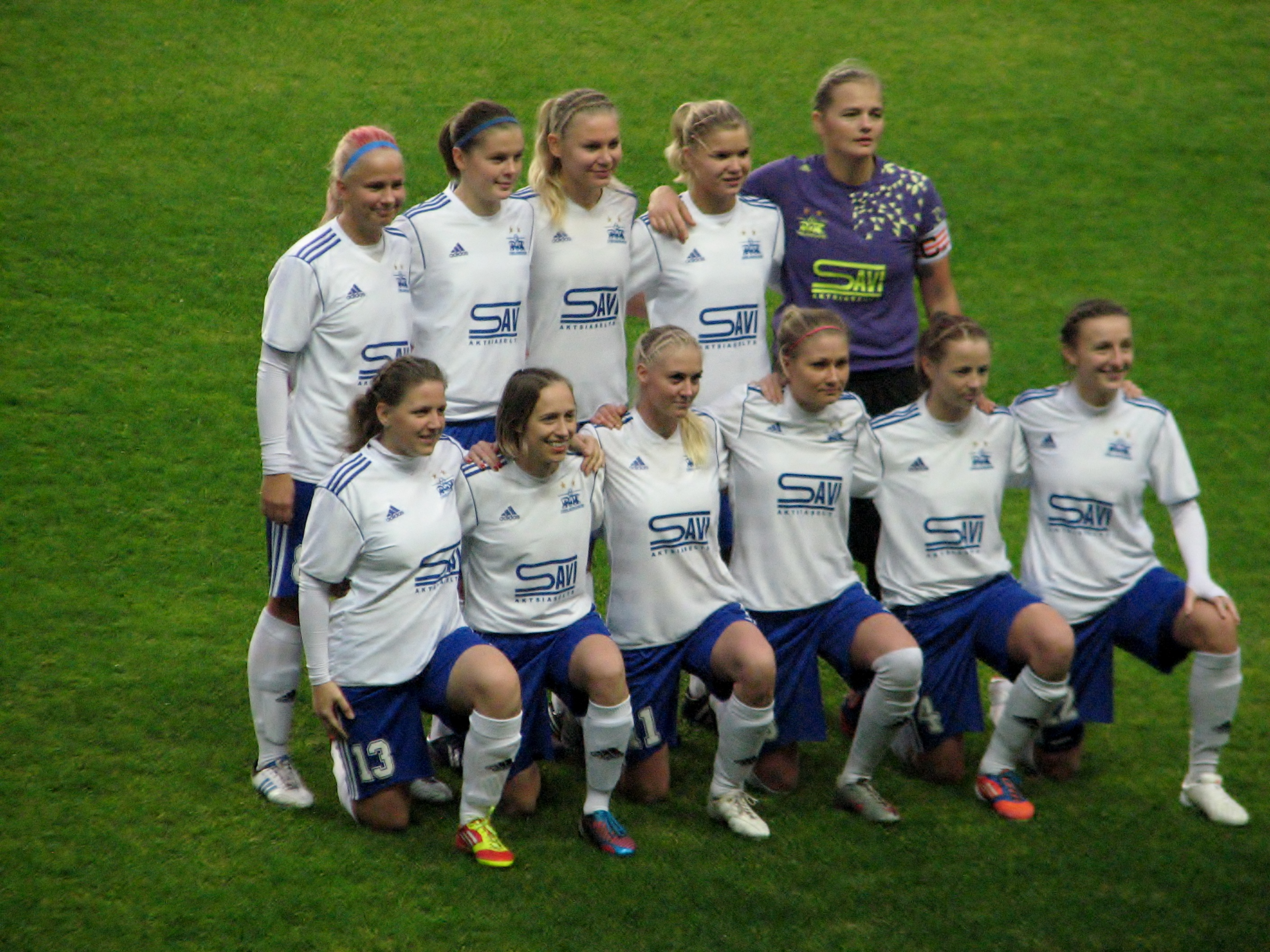
Pärnu JK - VfL Wolfsburg, 2013/14 UEFA Women's Champions League

== History ==
Pärnu Jalgpalliklubi was founded in 1989. The team won their first league title in the 1994–95 season. Pärnu made their European debut in the 2004–05 UEFA Women's Cup, finishing fourth in their group in the first qualifying round. In the 2013–14 UEFA Women's Champions League, Pärnu finished as runners-up in their group and advanced to the knockout-stage, where they were defeated by eventual champions VfL Wolfsburg 0–27 on aggregate.

== Players ==
=== First-team squad ===
As of 13 August 2018.

Note: Flags indicate national team as defined under FIFA eligibility rules; some limited exceptions apply. Players may hold more than one non-FIFA nationality.

No.	Pos.	Nation	Player
1	GK	EST	Mari-Ann Ploompuu
2	DF	EST	Saskia Sonnberg
4	DF	EST	Ketlin Saar
5	FW	EST	Ulrika Tülp
6	DF	EST	Anete Paulus
7	DF	UKR	Alina Svergun
8	MF	EST	Kairi Himanen
10	DF	EST	Berle Brant (captain)
12	GK	EST	Jennifer Smirnov
13	MF	EST	Aljona Sasova

No.	Pos.	Nation	Player
14	FW	EST	Sandra Paulberg
15	MF	EST	Laada Tereštšenkova
17	FW	UKR	Olena Lymar
19	FW	EST	Ljubov Maksimova
20	FW	EST	Merily Toom
21	FW	BLR	Anastasiya Shcherbachenya
22	MF	EST	Kristina Bannikova
30	DF	EST	Alika Malešina
32	MF	EST	Evelyn Šilina

== Honours ==
- Naiste Meistriliiga
  - Winners (13): 1994–95, 2003, 2004, 2005, 2006, 2010, 2011, 2012, 2013, 2014, 2015, 2016, 2017
- Estonian Women's Cup
  - Winners (6): 2010, 2011, 2012, 2014, 2015, 2017
- Estonian Women's Supercup
  - Winners (7): 2011, 2012, 2013, 2014, 2015, 2016, 2017

Former crest of Pärnu JK

== Record in UEFA competitions ==
All results (home, away and aggregate) list Pärnu's goal tally first.

Competition	Round	Club	Home	Away	Aggregate
2004–05	First qualifying round	(Hungary) Viktória FC-Szombathely	–	0–4	–
2004–05	First qualifying round	(Belarus) Bobruichanka Bobruisk (Host)	–	1–2	–
2004–05	First qualifying round	(Moldova) Codru Anenii Noi	–	1–5	–
2005–06	First qualifying round	(Finland) FC United (Host)	–	0–2	–
2005–06	First qualifying round	(Norway) Røa	–	1–9	–
2005–06	First qualifying round	(Iceland) Valur	–	1–8	–
2006–07	First qualifying round	(Serbia) Masinac Classic Niš	–	1–6	–
2006–07	First qualifying round	(Belgium) Rapide Wezemaal	–	0–7	–
2006–07	First qualifying round	(Slovenia) Pomurje (Host)	–	1–7	–
2007–08	First qualifying round	(Bulgaria) NSA Sofia	–	1–3	–
2007–08	First qualifying round	(Belarus) Universitet Vitebsk	–	0–6	–
2007–08	First qualifying round	(Greece) PAOK (Host)	–	2–3	–
2011–12	Qualifying round	(Slovenia) Krka Novo Mesto (Host)	–	2–1	–
2011–12	Qualifying round	(Spain) Rayo Vallecano	–	1–4	–
2011–12	Qualifying round	(Republic of Ireland) Peamount United	–	1–5	–
2012–13	Qualifying round	(Kazakhstan) BIIK Kazygurt	–	0–3	–
2012–13	Qualifying round	(Bulgaria) NSA Sofia	–	0–2	–
2012–13	Qualifying round	(Serbia) Spartak Subotica (Host)	–	0–1	–
2013–14	Qualifying round	(Greece) PAOK	–	3–1	–
2013–14	Qualifying round	(Finland) PK-35 Vantaa (Host)	–	0–0	–
2013–14	Qualifying round	(North Macedonia) Biljanini Izvori	–	3–1	–
2013–14	Round of 32	(Germany) VfL Wolfsburg	0–14	0–13	0–27
2014–15	Qualifying round	(Hungary) MTK	–	0–3	–
2014–15	Qualifying round	(Slovenia) Pomurje	–	0–4	–
2014–15	Qualifying round	(Montenegro) Ekonomist (Host)	–	2–1	–
2015–16	Qualifying round	(Romania) Olimpia Cluj	–	0–4	–
2015–16	Qualifying round	(Slovenia) Pomurje (Host)	–	1–2	–
2015–16	Qualifying round	(Montenegro) Ekonomist	–	2–1	–
2016–17	Qualifying round	(Romania) Olimpia Cluj	–	1–7	–
2016–17	Qualifying round	(Poland) Medyk Konin (Host)	–	0–1	–
2016–17	Qualifying round	(Montenegro) Breznica	–	2–2	–
2017–18	Qualifying round	(Belgium) Standard Liège	0–2	–	–
2017–18	Qualifying round	(Netherlands) Ajax	1–2	–	–
2017–18	Qualifying round	(Latvia) Rīgas FS	2–0	–	–
2018–19	Qualifying round	(Moldova) ȘS Anenii Noi	–	2–0	–
2018–19	Qualifying round	(Albania) Vllaznia	–	1–3	–
2018–19	Qualifying round	(Bosnia and Herzegovina) Sarajevo (Host)	–	1–2	–
