= Kalevi Keskstaadion =

Stadium in Tallinn, Estonia

Coordinates: 59°25′32.98″N 24°45′53.16″E

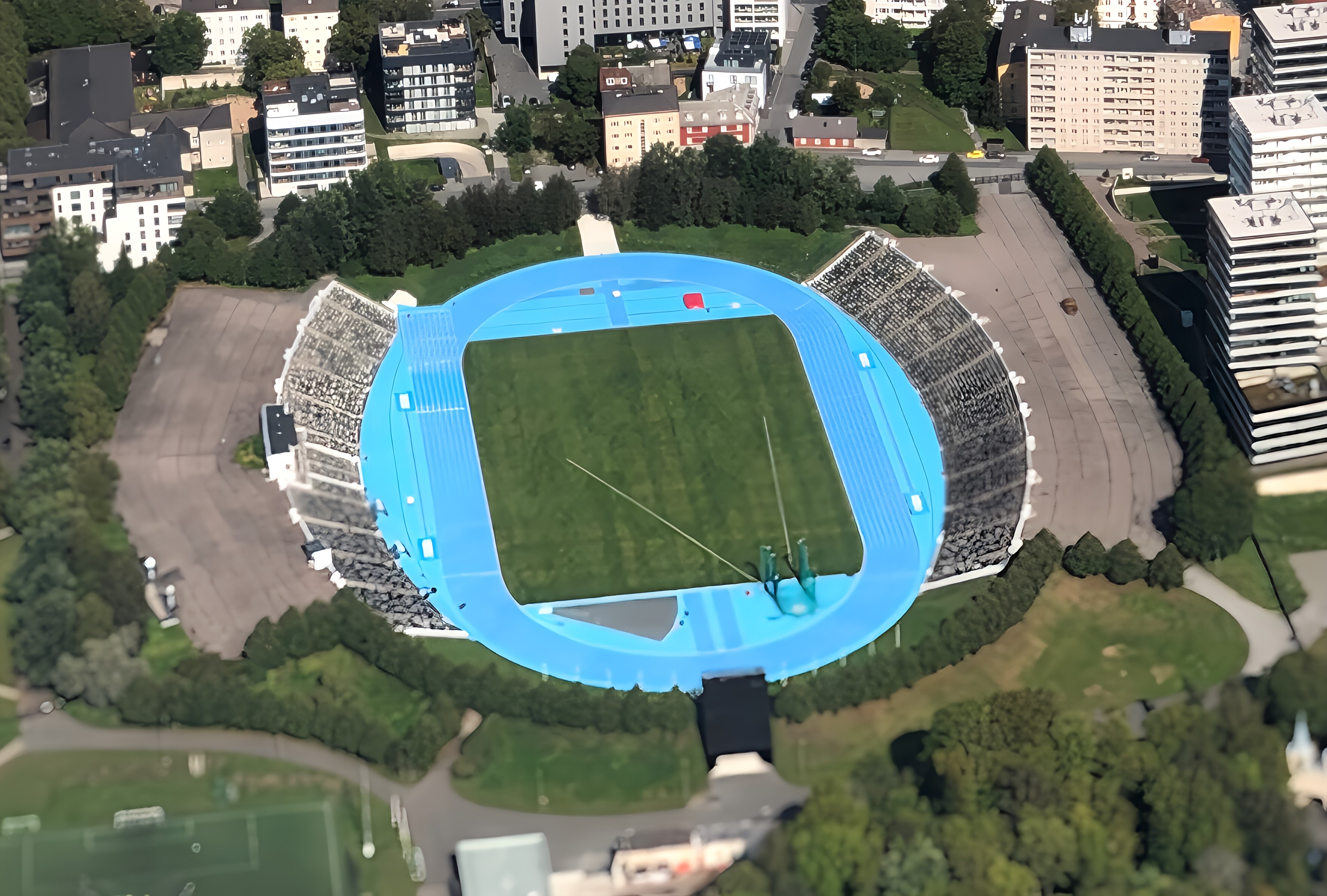
- Interactive map of Kalevi Keskstaadion
- Former names: Komsomoli Staadion
- Address: Staadioni tn 3, 10132 Tallinn
- Location: Tallinn, Estonia
- Owner: Sports Association Kalev
- Capacity: 11,842 (9,908 seated)
- Surface: Grass
- Record attendance: 21,100 (Tallinna JK Dünamo vs Stockholm IK Sture, 6 June 1956)
- Field size: 105 m × 68 m (344 ft × 223 ft)

Construction
- Opened: 12 July 1955; 71 years ago
- Renovated: 2019–2022
- Architects: Erika Nõva; Peeter Tarvas

Tenants
- Tallinna Kalev (1955–1961, 2002–2016); Tallinna Sport (1985–1989); Tallinna Sadam (1992–1998)

Kalevi Keskstaadion (English: Kalevi Central Stadium) is a multi-purpose stadium in Tallinn, Estonia. Opened in 1955 and having a capacity of 11,842, it is the permanent home of the Estonian Dance Festival and the former home ground of JK Tallinna Kalev. Kalevi Keskstaadion was one of the host venues for the 2026 UEFA European Under-17 Championship.

== History ==
=== 20th century ===
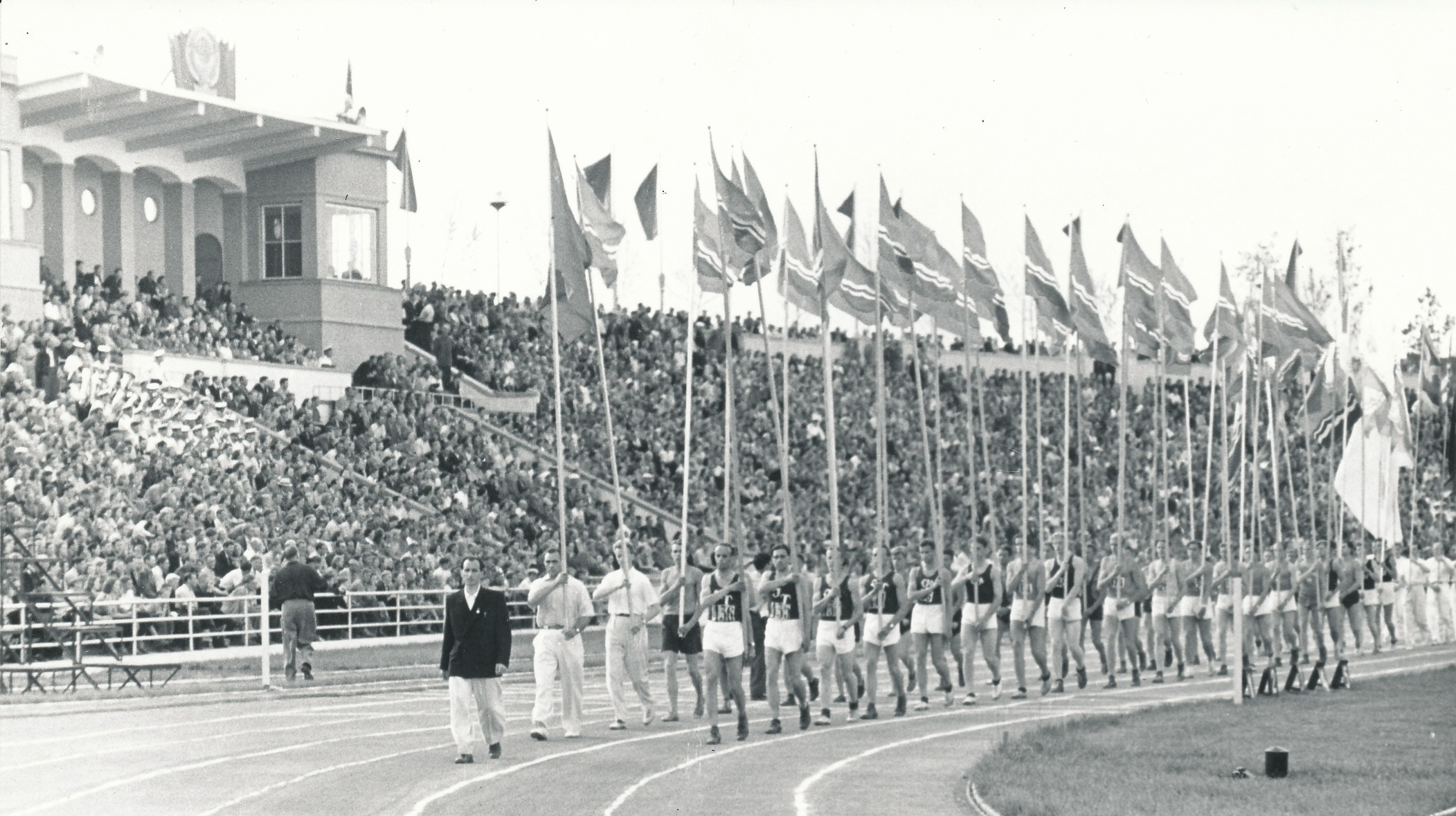
The opening event of the stadium on 15 July 1955

The stadium was built during the Soviet occupation of Estonia and opened on 12 July 1955. It was the first new large-scale sports complex built in Tallinn after World War II. The initial plans were grandiose: the first blueprints saw the stadium have a 30,000-capacity seating area and a 16,000-capacity standing area, as well as a 6-meter-tall (20 ft) statue depicting Estonian folklore hero Kalevipoeg. However, the project was later scaled down and saw the stadium have a capacity of 12,000.

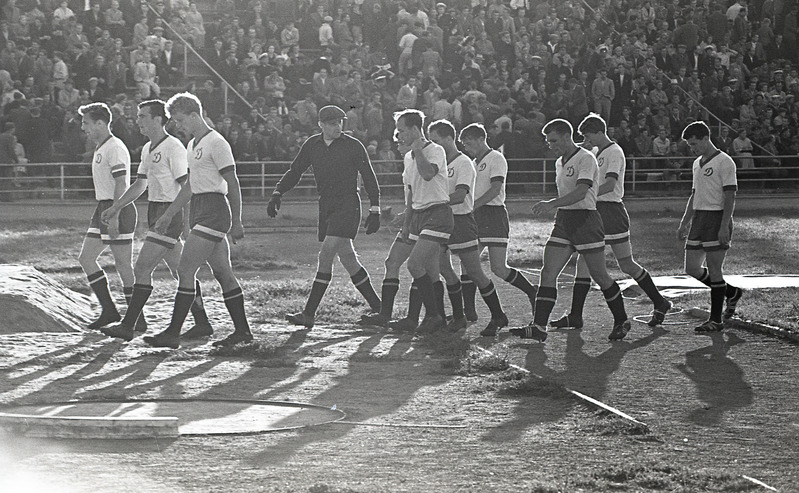
Lev Yashin and Dynamo Moscow in their league match against Kalev, 1960

The record attendance of 21,100 was set in a friendly match between Tallinna Dünamo and Swedish third tier club Stockholm IK Sture in 1956. It was the first time since the country's occupation when an Estonian football club was able to face a foreign opponent coming outside of the Soviet Union.

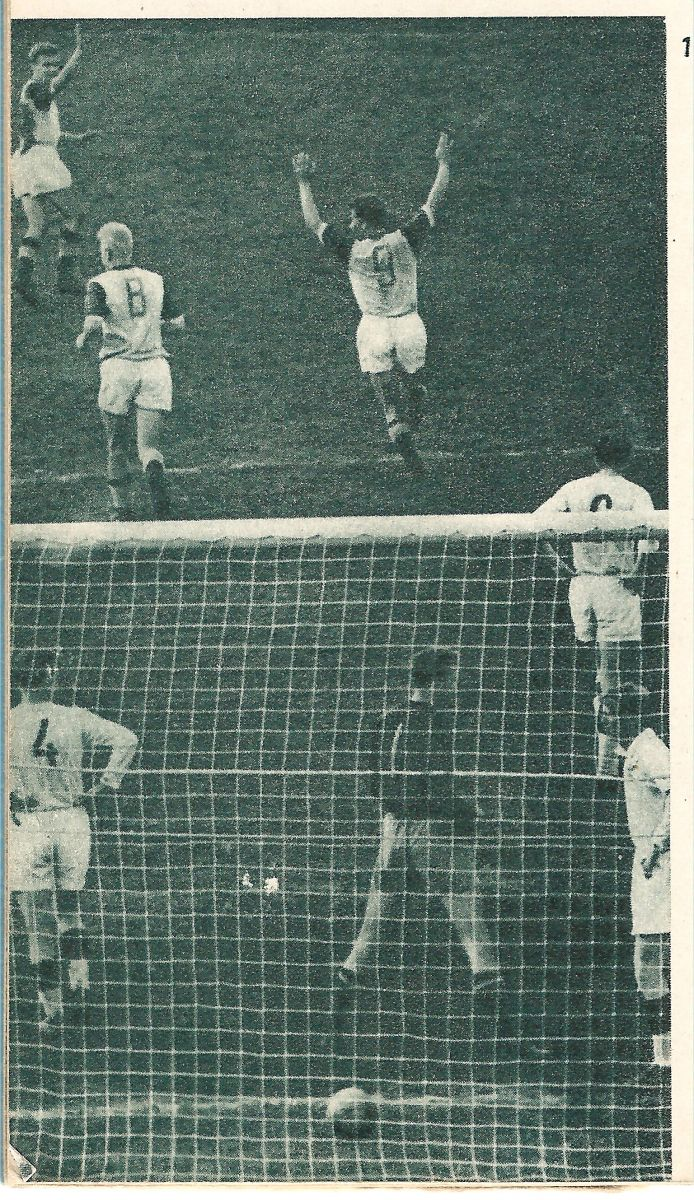
Kalev 2–2 Spartak Moscow, 1961

In 1960, Tallinna Kalev joined the Soviet Top League and in the following two years, the stadium hosted numerous high-profile football matches. The match against Dynamo Moscow on 5 August 1960 brought around 20,000 people onto the stands and among the players playing was Dynamo's Lev Yashin, who along with a number of his teammates had been crowned European champions less than a month before and who won the Ballon d'Or three years after said match, while being widely regarded as the greatest goalkeeper in the history of the sport. Until 1989, the stadium was officially known as Komsomoli staadion, named after the Soviet youth organisation. It was renamed Kalevi Keskstaadion in 1989, during the period of national reawakening.

=== 21st century ===
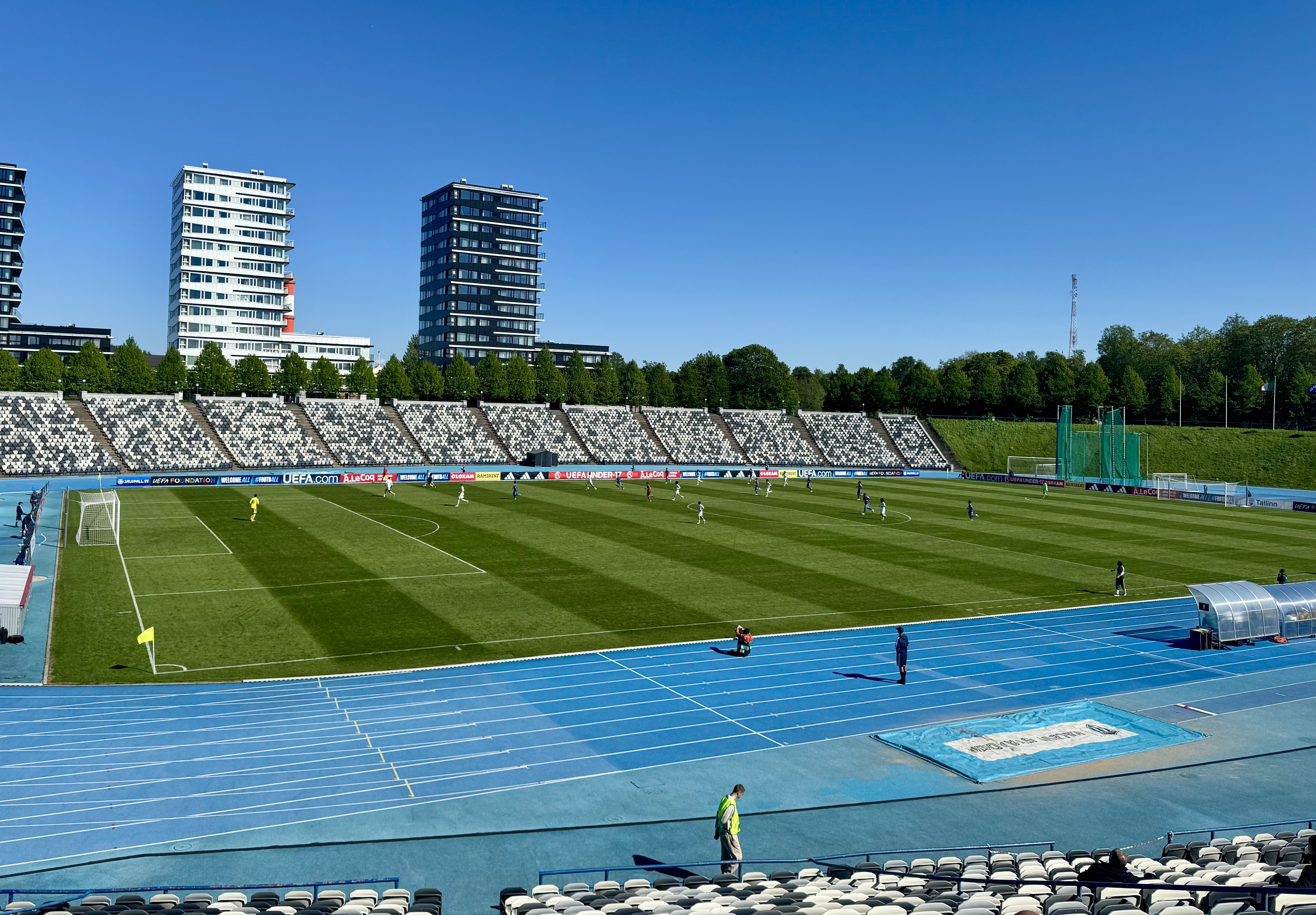
The stadium hosting the 2026 UEFA U17 European Championship match between France U17 and Italy U17

The 2000s saw the stadium's condition worsen to the point that in 2007, the Estonian FA declared the grass pitch unusable for top-flight football. In 2015, plans for major reconstruction were announced, and the concept design also included a possibility to increase the capacity to 30,000 in the distant future. The renovation works began after the 2019 Estonian Dance Festival and the stadium was re-opened in 2022. A light blue colour scheme was given to the running track as one of the new features for the venue. Following the renovation, JK Tallinna Kalev has not returned to the stadium due to a dispute with the owner of the stadium complex, the Estonian Sports Association Kalev, which evolved into a court case. In 2026, Kalevi Keskstaadion served as one of four venues for the 2026 UEFA European Under-17 Championship.

== Artificial turf stadium ==
The sports complex of the Kalevi Keskstaadion also has an artificial turf ground named Kalevi kunstmurustaadion. Located at the southwest corner of the main stadium, the field is home to Kalev's youth teams. It also served as the home to Kalev's first team from 2017 until 2019 and in 2021.

== Gallery ==
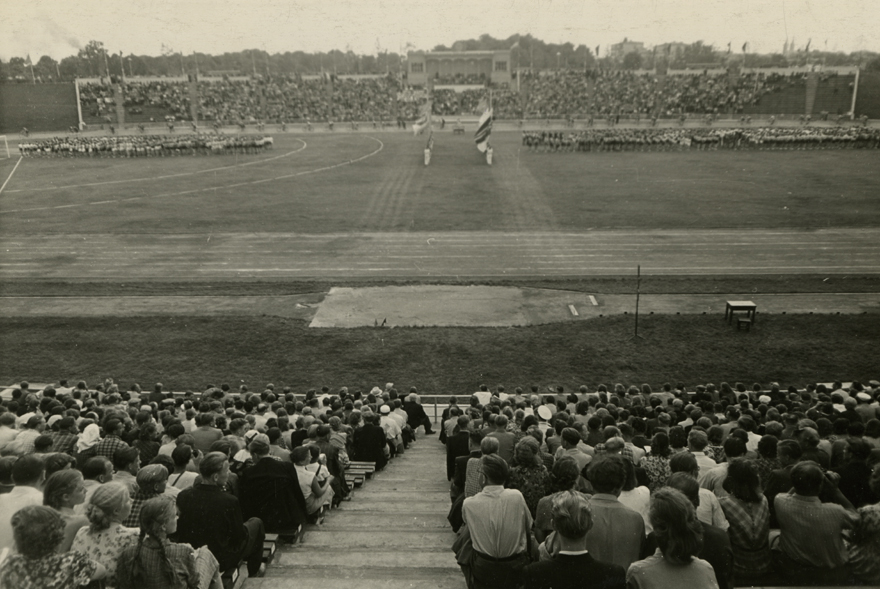
Kalevi Keskstaadion in the 1950s

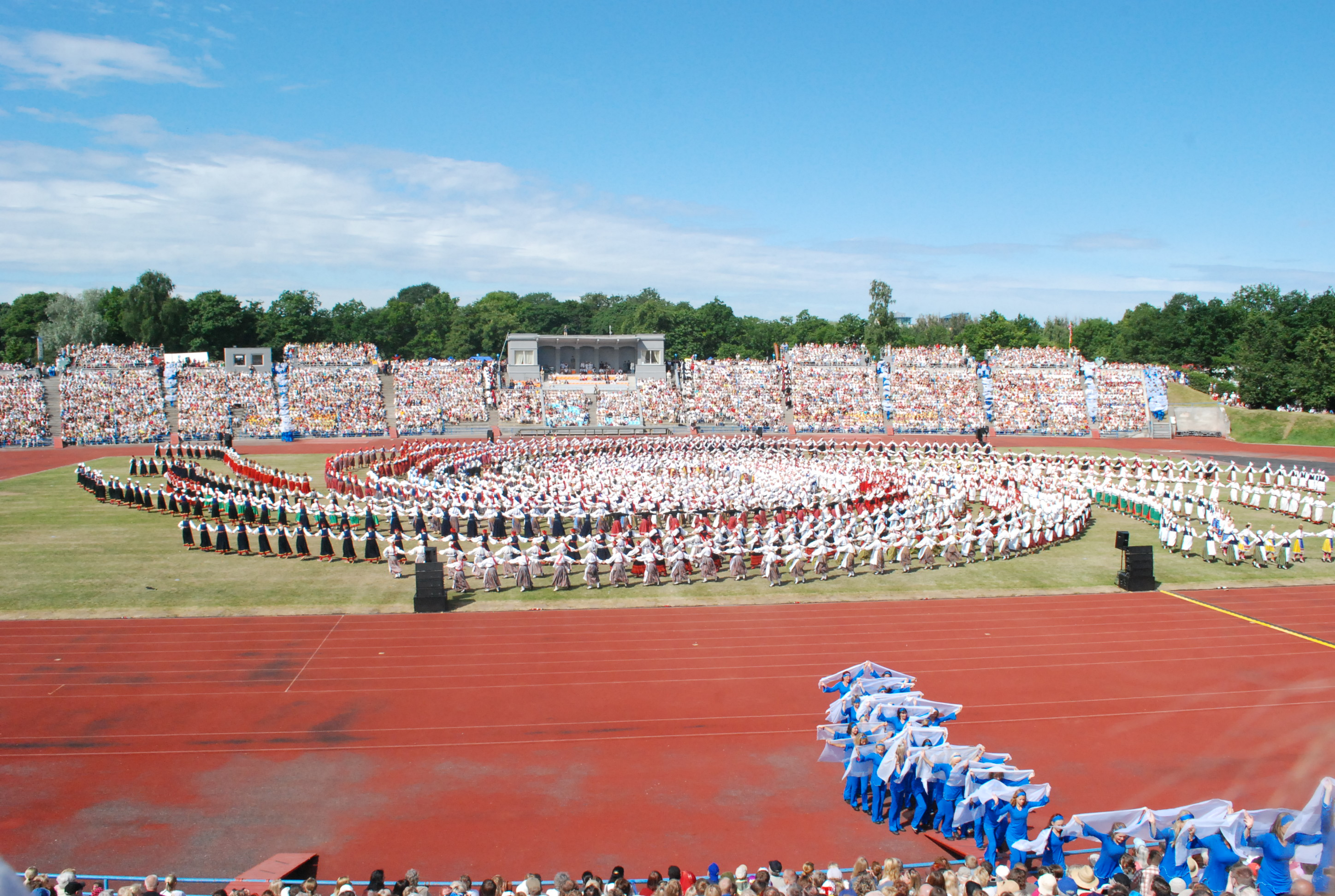
Kalevi Keskstaadion in 2009

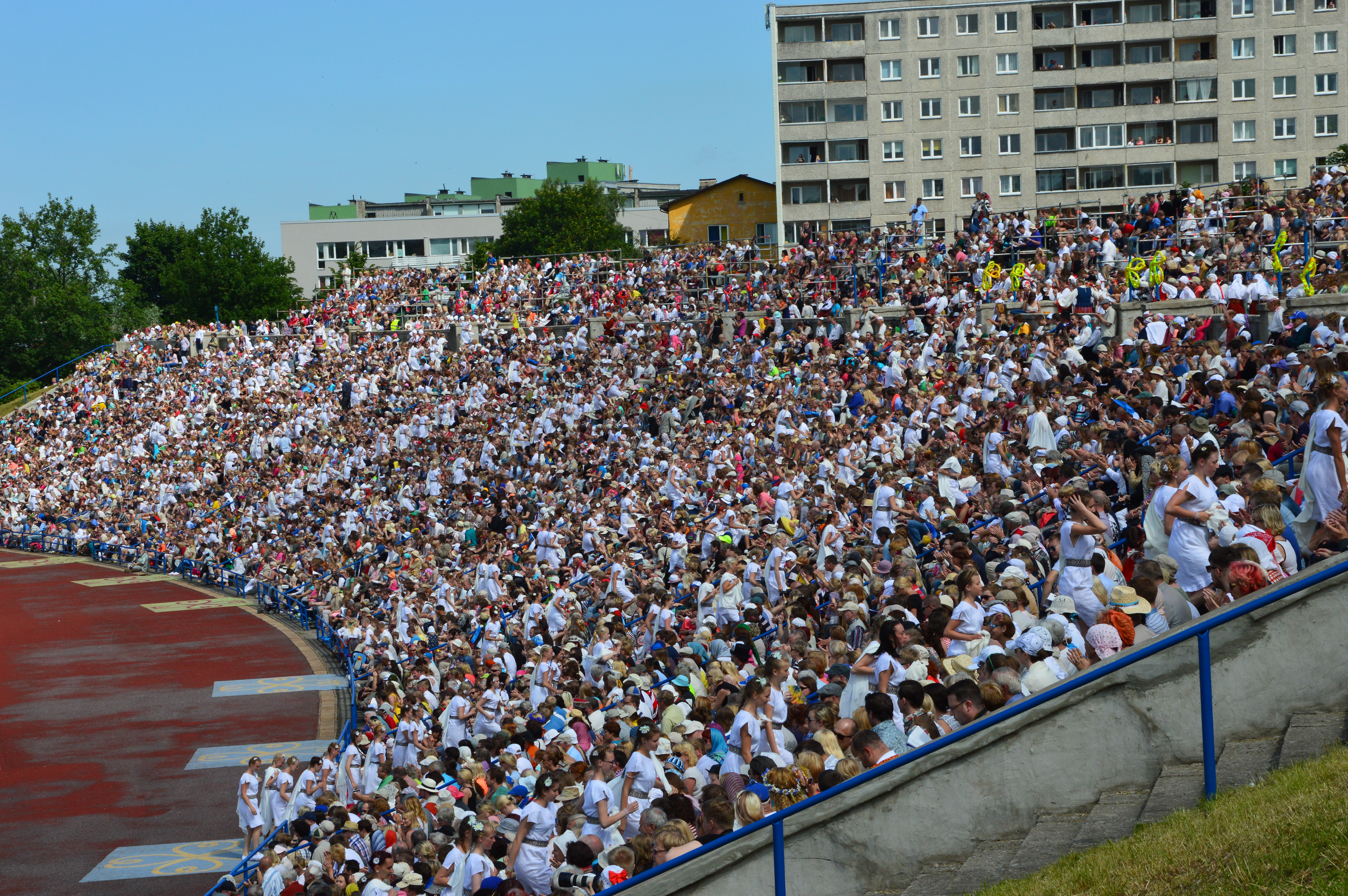
Stadium at its full capacity.

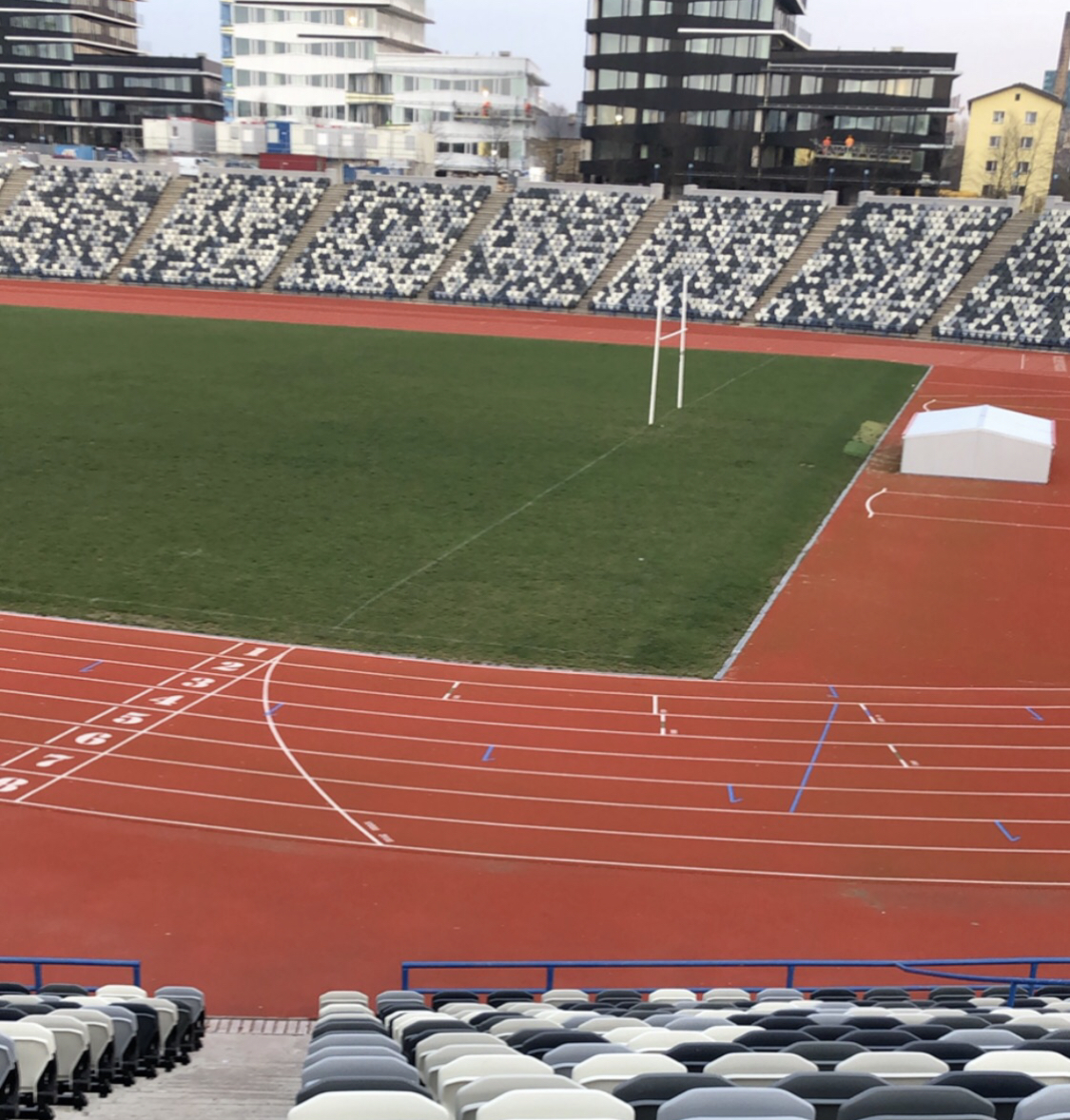
The stadium in 2019

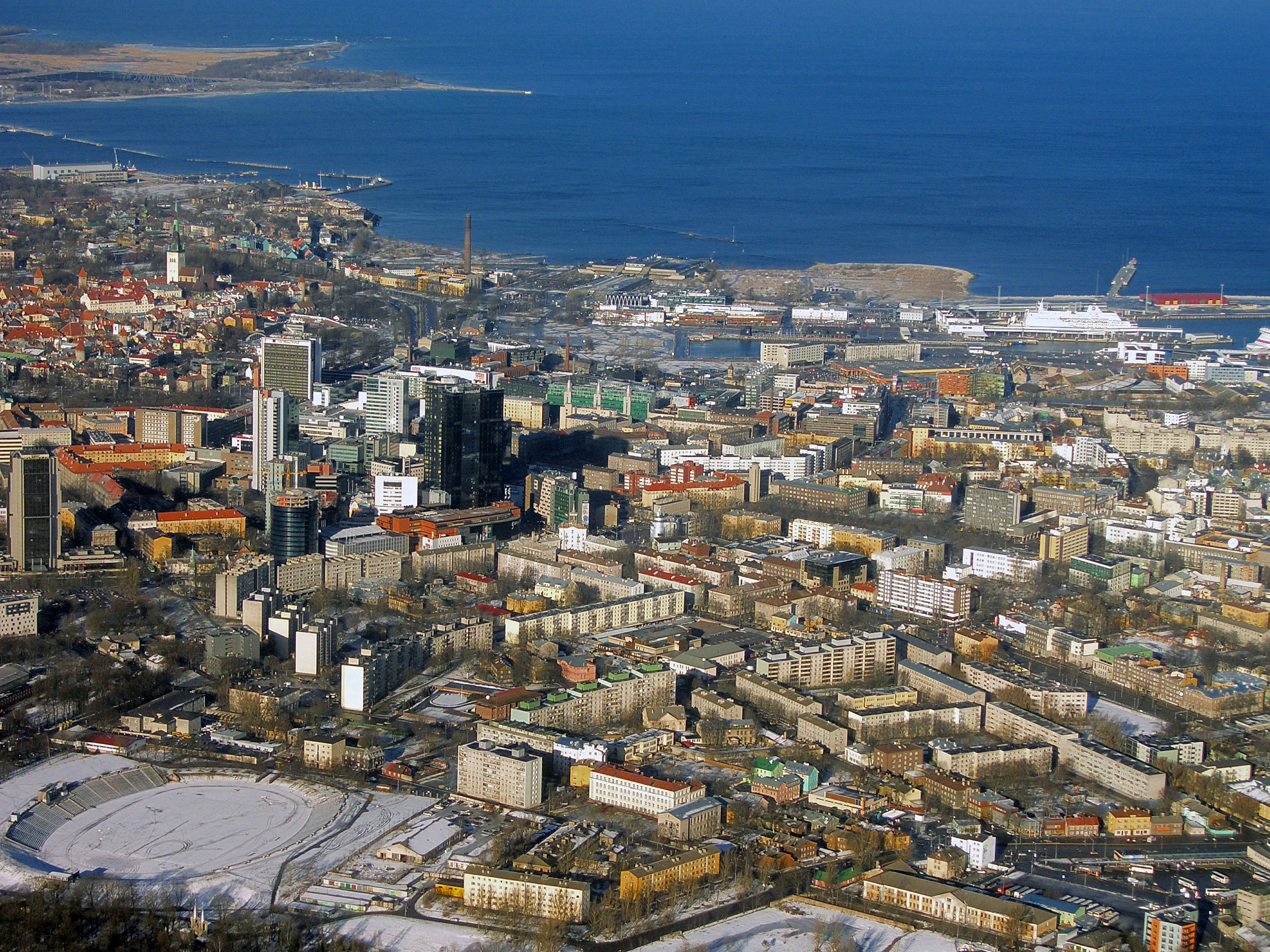
The stadium (in the bottom left corner) in February 2009

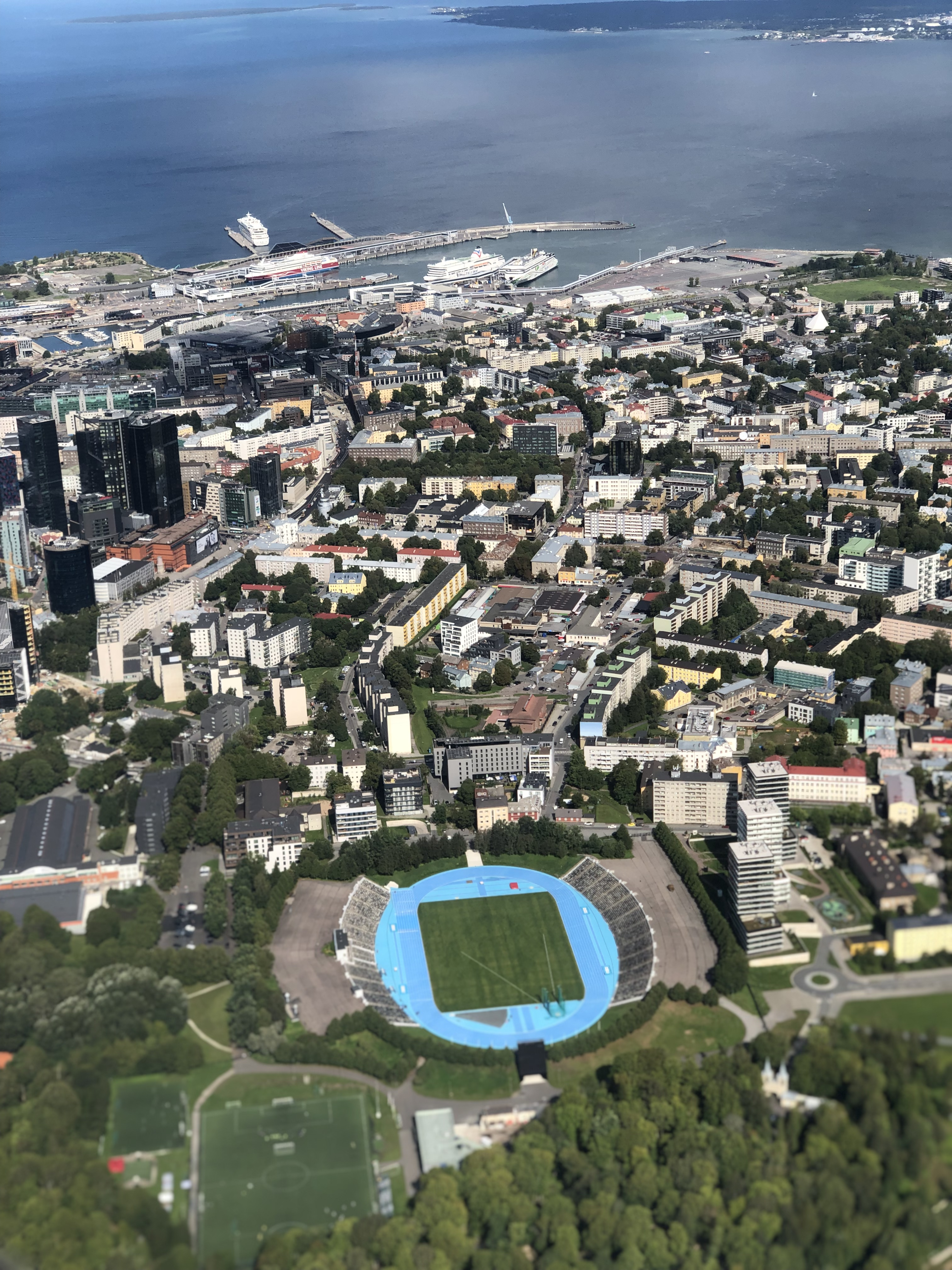
The stadium in August 2023

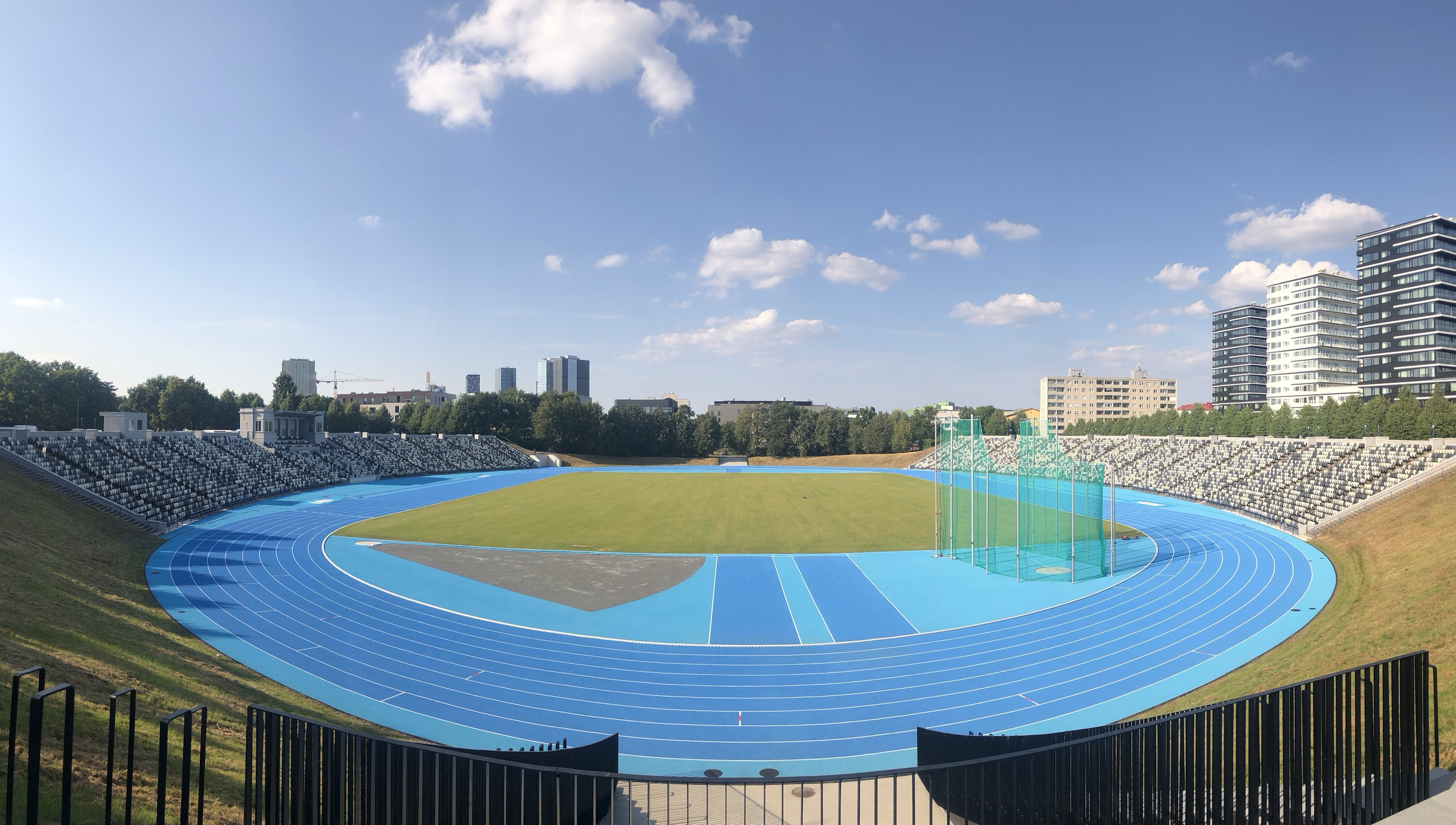
Kalevi Keskstaadion after renovation works in August 2022

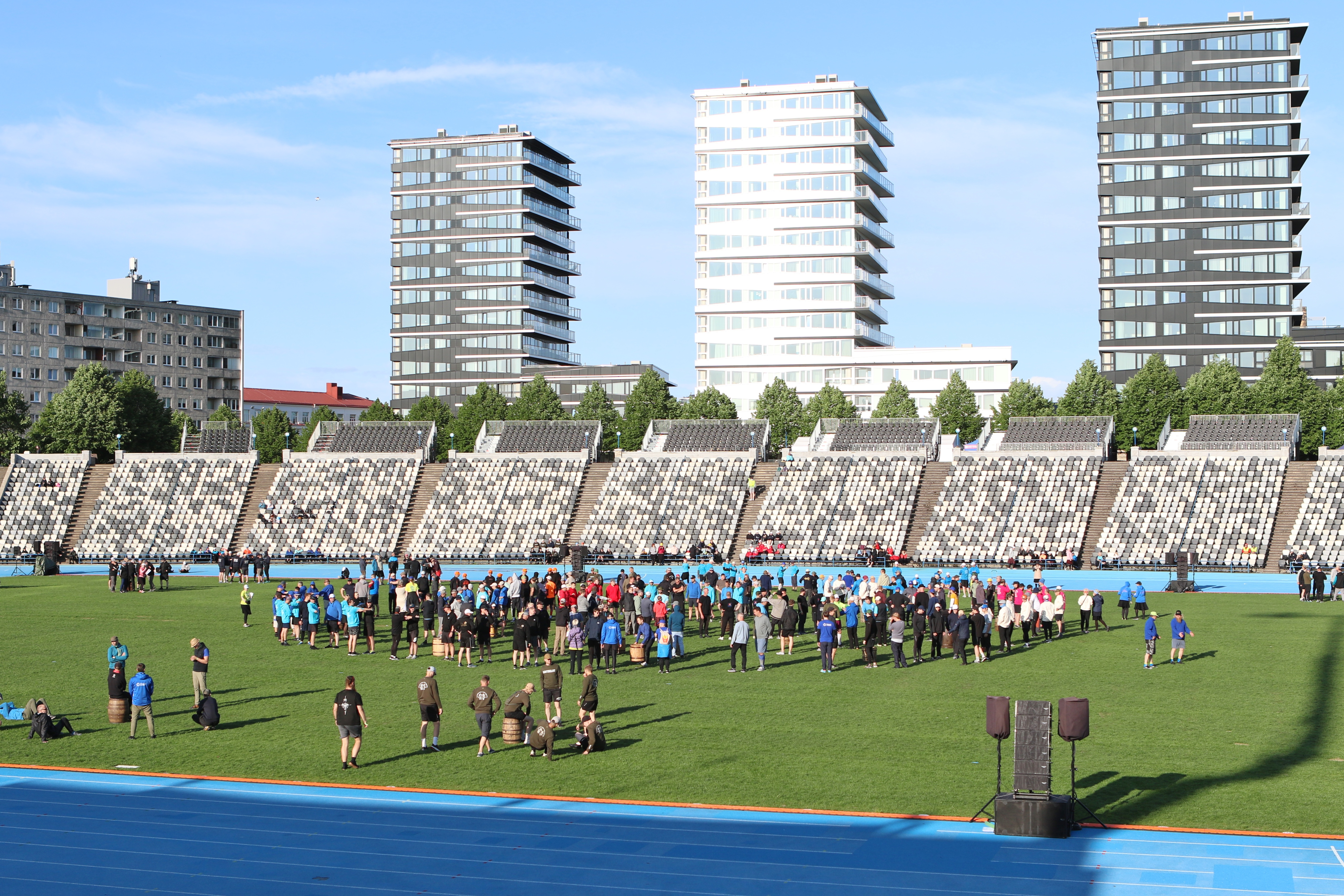
The stadium before the Estonian Dance Festival in 2025
