= Naiste Meistriliiga =

Estonian women's football league

- Founded: 1994
- Country: Estonia
- Confederation: UEFA
- Number of clubs: 6
- Level on pyramid: 1
- Relegation to: Naiste Esiliiga
- Domestic cup: Estonian Women's Cup
- International cup: Champions League
- Current champions: Paide Linnanaiskond — (1th title) - 2026 -
- Most championships: Pärnu (13 titles)
- Website: Official website
- Current: 2026 Naiste Meistriliiga

The Naiste Meistriliiga (English: Women's Champions League) is the highest league of women's association football in Estonia. It is run by the Estonian Football Association and was founded in 1994. The league currently consists of eight teams. The league champion qualifies for the UEFA Women's Champions League.

== Current clubs ==
The following eight clubs will compete in the 2025 season.

Locations of the 2025 Naiste Meistriliiga teams

Team	Location	Ground	Capacity	2024 season
Flora	Tallinn	Lilleküla harjutusväljak I	200	1st
Saku Sporting	Saku	Saku staadion	1,000	2nd
Tabasalu	Tabasalu	Tabasalu Arena	1,630	3rd
Tallinna Kalev	Tallinn	Kalev Keskstaadion artificial turf	570	4th
Tammeka	Tartu	Sepa Football Centre artificial turf	508	5th
Viimsi	Haabneeme	Viimsi Stadium	800	6th
Ararat Tallinna	Tallinn	Ajaxi Kunstmuruvaljak		7th
Elva	Elva	Elva linnastaadion	600	Esiliiga, 1st

== Champions ==
=== By season ===
This section lists all champions since the league's inception and the previous Estonian league champions.

Season	Champions	Runners-up	Third place	Top scorer	Goals
1994	Central Sport	Tulevik	Nõmme Chickens		
1994–95	Pärnu	Central Jõmm	Tulevik		
1995–96	Central Sport (2)	Pärnu	Tulevik		
1996–97	Central Sport (3)	Pärnu	TKSK Arsenal	(Estonia) Anastassia Morkovkina (Narvane/TKSK Arsenal)	13
1997–98	TKSK Arsenal	Pärnu	Wiiking	(Estonia) Anastassia Morkovkina (TKSK Arsenal)	47
1998	TKSK Arsenal (2)	Pärnu	Flora	(Estonia) Anastassia Morkovkina (TKSK Arsenal)	29
1999	TKSK (3)	Pärnu	Flora	(Estonia) Andra Karpin (Pärnu)	31
2000	TKSK (4)	Pärnu	Flora	(Estonia) Anastassia Morkovkina (Pärnu)	28
2001	TKSK Visa (5)	Eesti Näitused	Pärnu		
2002	TKSK Visa (6)	Pärnu	Estel	(Estonia) Ave Pajo (Estel)	33
2003	Pärnu (2)	TKSK Visa	Estel	(Estonia) Anastassia Morkovkina (Pärnu)	46
2004	Pärnu (3)	TKSK Visa	Ajax TLMK	(Estonia) Anastassia Morkovkina (Pärnu)	58
2005	Pärnu (4)	TKSK Visa	Tallinna Kalev	(Estonia) Anastassia Morkovkina (Pärnu)	63
2006	Pärnu (5)	Levadia	Tallinna Kalev	(Estonia) Anastassia Morkovkina (Pärnu)	61
2007	Levadia (7)	Pärnu	Flora	(Estonia) Katrin Loo (Flora)	30
2008	Levadia (8)	Pärnu	Flora	(Estonia) Ave Pajo (Tallinna Kalev)	47
2009	Levadia (9)	Flora	Pärnu	(Estonia) Ave Pajo (Levadia)	59
2010	Pärnu (6)	Flora	Levadia	(Estonia) Ave Pajo (Levadia)	33
2011	Pärnu (7)	Flora	Levadia	(Estonia) Anastassia Morkovkina (Pärnu)	36
2012	Pärnu (8)	Flora	Levadia	(Estonia) Anastassia Morkovkina (Pärnu)	37
2013	Pärnu (9)	Flora	Levadia	(Estonia) Anastassia Morkovkina (Pärnu)	34
2014	Pärnu (10)	Flora	Levadia	(Estonia) Anastassia Morkovkina (Pärnu)	34
2015	Pärnu (11)	Flora	Levadia	(Estonia) Anastassia Morkovkina (Pärnu)	34
2016	Pärnu (12)	Flora	Levadia	(Estonia) Anastassia Morkovkina (Pärnu)	35
2017	Pärnu (13)	Flora	Levadia	(Estonia) Lisette Tammik (Flora)	33
2018	Flora	Pärnu	Levadia	(Estonia) Katrin Loo (Flora)	29
2019	Flora (2)	Pärnu	Tallinna Kalev	(Estonia) Katrin Loo (Flora)	36
2020	Flora (3)	Tallinna Kalev	Saku Sporting	(Estonia) Katrin Loo (Flora)	36
2021	Flora (4)	Saku Sporting	Tallinna Kalev	(Estonia) Lisette Tammik (Flora)	25
2022	Flora (5)	Saku Sporting	Tallinna Kalev	(Estonia) Emma Treiberg (Saku Sporting)	40
2023	Flora (6)	Saku Sporting	Tammeka	(Estonia) Kristina Teern (Flora)	30
2024	Flora (7)	Saku Sporting	Tabasalu	(Estonia) Lisette Tammik (Flora)	25
2025	Flora (8)	Saku Sporting	Viimsi	(Estonia) Mari Liis Lillemäe (Flora)	29

=== By team ===
Titles	Team
13	Pärnu
9	Levadia
8	Flora
3	Central Sport
1	Paide Linnanaiskond

1. TKSK Arsenal, TKSK, TKSK Visa, and Levadia are all names held at different times by a single club.
