= JK Tallinna Kalev (women) =

Estonian football club

Tallinna Kalev
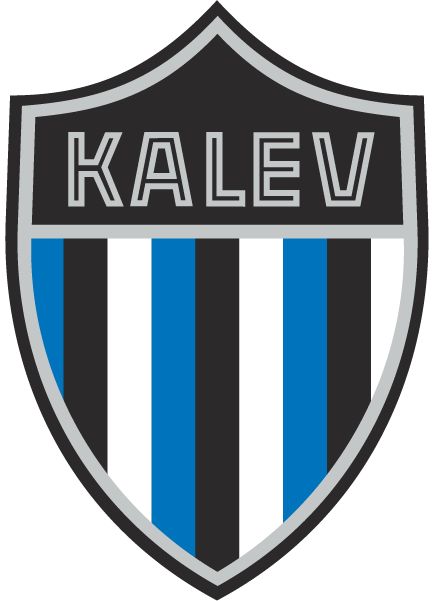
- Full name: Jalgpalliklubi Tallinna Kalev
- Ground: Kalevi Keskstaadioni kunstmuruväljak, Tallinn
- Capacity: 570
- Manager: Maksim Rõtškov
- League: Naiste Meistriliiga
- 2025: 5th
- Website: https://www.jkkalev.ee
Home colours	Away colours

Jalgpalliklubi Tallinna Kalev ladies' team is an Estonian women's association football club from Tallinn. The club currently plays in Naiste Meistriliiga, the first level in the Estonian women's football system.

The club has placed second in the league and lost in the Estonian Cup final, but has won the Supercup.

== Honours ==
- Naiste Meistriliiga
  - Runner-up (1): 2020
- Estonian Women's Cup
  - Runner-up (3): 2017, 2020, 2022
- Estonian Women's Supercup
  - Winners (1): 2021

== Current squad ==
As of 13 October 2025

Note: Flags indicate national team as defined under FIFA eligibility rules; some limited exceptions apply. Players may hold more than one non-FIFA nationality.

No.	Pos.	Nation	Player
4	FW	EST	Maria Orav
5	DF	EST	Birjo Rasmussen
6	DF	EST	Anastasija Fjodorova
7	FW	EST	Vanessa Grutop
10	MF	EST	Anett Vilipuu
12	DF	EST	Mirell Soasepp
14	MF	EST	Žanna Smirnova
17	MF	EST	Anneli Liivamägi
18	DF	EST	Sabina Ahmedova
19	MF	EST	Meribel Vägi
21	DF	EST	Johanna Marie Link
24	MF	EST	Marian Jaarman
25	GK	EST	Ursula Isand
27	MF	EST	Liisa Suup

No.	Pos.	Nation	Player
28	FW	EST	Sandra-Henrica Saul
29	DF	EST	Liisa Annijaani
31	DF	EST	Annika Remmelgas
32	MF	EST	Loore Lehmets
33	FW	EST	Birgitta Emilia Maria Ots
35	DF	EST	Jenna Jõerand
37	DF	EST	Sara Loviisa Pajuste
39	FW	EST	Jane Mirjam
55	MF	EST	Triinu-Liis Grafova
71	DF	EST	Hanna Karoliina Kalle
74	DF	EST	Hanna Liisa Sulg
77	FW	EST	Roberta Jürna
98	FW	EST	Roberta Jürna
