= FC Flora (women) =

Estonian football club

Flora
- Full name: FC Flora
- Founded: 1997; 28 years ago
- Ground: Lilleküla harjutusväljak I
- Manager: Aleksandra Ševoldajeva
- League: Naiste Meistriliiga
- 2025: 1st (champions)
- Website: http://www.fcflora.ee/naiskond
Home colours	Away colours

FC Flora Tallinn, commonly known as Flora Tallinn, or simply as Flora, is a football club, based in Tallinn, Estonia, that competes in the Naiste Meistriliiga.

Established in 1997 as the women's football division of Flora, the team has won 7 Naiste Meistriliiga, 9 Estonian Women's Cups and 8 Estonian Women's Supercups.

== History ==
Founded in March 1997 as Flora ladies team, Flora Naiskond played their first league game in the following month against the defending champions Pärnu, losing 0–3. Despite this, the team went on to enjoy some early success as Flora finished third in the 1998 season. Flora managed to repeat this feat in the next two seasons in 1999 and 2000.

The following seasons were more disappointing as Flora finished 4th in 2001 and 2002 and 5th in 2003. Problems deepened during the winter of 2003 and Flora had to start the 2004 season without a manager before Anders Süvari, who had coached the team before, returned in summer. Despite this the team managed to win their first 4 league games. Revitalized, Flora once again challenged the top 3 but missed out narrowly, losing 2–3 in the penultimate round and leaving the team just two points away from the bronze medals. Late in the season, Süvari was replaced by Allan Soomets who remained as coach until the 2012 season. Since December 2012 the team has been coached by Richard Barnwell.

Flora finished the league third in the 2007 and 2008 season but eventually became champions for the first time in 2018. They have also been successful in the Estonian Women's Cup, winning the competition in 2013 by defeating league rivals Pärnu 2–0 in the finals. On 1 December 2015, Aleksandra Ševoldajeva was appointed as manager.

== Honours ==
- Naiste Meistriliiga
  - Winners (8): 2018, 2019, 2020, 2021, 2022, 2023, 2024, 2025
- Estonian Women's Cup
  - Winners (9): 2007, 2008, 2013, 2018, 2019, 2020, 2021, 2022, 2024
- Estonian Women's Supercup
  - Winners (8): 2009, 2010, 2018, 2019, 2020, 2022, 2023, 2024

== Players ==
=== Current squad ===
As of 13 October 2025

Note: Flags indicate national team as defined under FIFA eligibility rules; some limited exceptions apply. Players may hold more than one non-FIFA nationality.

No.	Pos.	Nation	Player
1	GK	EST	Victoria Vihman
2	DF	EST	Alesja Kiuru
3	MF	EST	Dajana Smirnova
4	DF	EST	Anett Joandi
5	DF	EST	Karola Purgats
7	FW	EST	Darina Kudjavnina
8	DF	EST	Heidi Melis
9	DF	EST	Elisabeth Õispuu
11	FW	EST	Anželika Jotkina
12	GK	EST	Katarina Elisabeth Käpa
13	MF	EST	Eline Ruth Häberli
14	DF	EST	Marta Panova
15	FW	EST	Eva-Maria Niit
17	DF	EST	Liselle Palts

No.	Pos.	Nation	Player
19	MF	EST	Anastassia Ivanova
23	MF	EST	Egle-Eliise Kurg
27	FW	EST	Elis Soodla
28	DF	EST	Kristiina Tullus
33	MF	EST	Kelly Rosen
38	DF	EST	Grethel Sootaga
55	GK	EST	Irina Kozljajeva
59	FW	EST	Lisette Tammik
61	FW	EST	Getter Saar
64	MF	EST	Karmen Vapper
68	DF	EST	Hanna Haavistu
72	MF	EST	Mari-Liis Lillemäe
77	FW	EST	Gretlin Pihlak

== Management ==
=== Current technical staff ===
Position	Name
Head coach	(Estonia) Aleksandra Ševoldajeva
