= Tartu JK Tammeka (women) =

Estonian football club

- Ground: Tamme Stadium, Tartu
- Capacity: 2,000
- Chairman: Kalle Paas
- Manager: Sirje Roops
- League: Naiste Meistriliiga
- 2025: 6th
- Website: http://www.jktammeka.ee/esindusnaiskond

Tartu JK Tammeka ladies' team is an Estonian women's association football club from Tartu. The club currently plays in Naiste Meistriliiga, the first level in the Estonian women's football system.

== Current technical staff ==
| Position | Name |
|---|---|
| Manager | (Estonia) Kaivo Sang |
| Assistant manager | (Estonia) Hannes Värs |

=== Current squad ===
As of 13 October 2025

Note: Flags indicate national team as defined under FIFA eligibility rules; some limited exceptions apply. Players may hold more than one non-FIFA nationality.

| No. | Pos. | Nation | Player |
|---|---|---|---|
| 2 | DF | EST | Kertu Mugu |
| 3 | DF | EST | Kaisa Triin Arike |
| 4 | DF | EST | Kärt Kallip |
| 5 | GK | EST | Saskia Koskor |
| 7 | MF | EST | Miia Jonuks |
| 8 | MF | EST | Polina Ohvrill |
| 9 | MF | EST | Gertrud Alice Kala |
| 10 | FW | EST | Aleksandra Kelli |
| 11 | MF | EST | Olivia Paet |
| 14 | GK | EST | Heliisa Aasa |
| 15 | DF | EST | Grete Kraus |

| No. | Pos. | Nation | Player |
|---|---|---|---|
| 16 | DF | EST | Anna-Martha Reino |
| 17 | DF | EST | Adele Rebane |
| 18 | DF | EST | Annegret Kala |
| 21 | MF | EST | Carola Erik |
| 22 | DF | EST | Carmen Kaidi River |
| 23 | FW | EST | Rianna Väärsi |
| 25 | FW | EST | Annamarii Tamm |
| 26 | MF | EST | Marie Kiivit |
| 43 | GK | EST | Lisette Teder |
| 77 | MF | EST | Nicole Kelli |
