= FC Levadia Tallinn (women) =

Estonian football club

FCI Levadia
- Full name: FCI Levadia
- Founded: 1993; 32 years ago, as TKSK Tallinn
- Ground: Maarjamäe Stadium
- Manager: Maksim Rõtškov
- League: Naiste Meistriliiga
- 2017: 3rd
- Website: fclevadia.ee
Home colours	Away colours

FCI Levadia Tallinn women's team are an Estonian women's football team based in Tallinn, Estonia, that competes in the Naiste Meistriliiga, the top flight of Estonian women's football.

The team was founded in 1993 as TKSK. In 2002, they became the first Estonian team to compete in the UEFA Women's Cup. In 2006, the team became affiliated with Levadia. The team has won nine Naiste Meistriliiga and two Estonian Women's Cup trophies.

== Honours ==
=== Domestic ===
- Naiste Meistriliiga

Winners (9): 1997–98, 1999, 1999, 2000, 2001, 2002, 2007, 2008, 2009

- Estonian Women's Cup

Winners (2): 2009, 2016

=== Regional ===
- Women's Baltic League

Winners: 2007

== Players ==
=== First-team squad ===
As of 30 August 2017.

Note: Flags indicate national team as defined under FIFA eligibility rules; some limited exceptions apply. Players may hold more than one non-FIFA nationality.

No.	Pos.	Nation	Player
3	MF	(Estonia) EST	Lika Panova
4	DF	(Latvia) LVA	Angelina Jegorova
7	MF	(Russia) RUS	Anastasia Dodeltseva
8	FW	(Estonia) EST	Vlada Kubassova (captain)
9	FW	(Russia) RUS	Olesia Parkhomovich
10	MF	(Estonia) EST	Killu Raja
11	FW	(Estonia) EST	Naidä Imanova
14	DF	(Estonia) EST	Kadre Päri

No.	Pos.	Nation	Player
15	MF	(Estonia) EST	Mari Abel
16	DF	(Estonia) EST	Alina Terebunskaja
17	MF	(Estonia) EST	Viktorija Draguntseva
20	DF	(Estonia) EST	Karina Vazikka
21	DF	(Estonia) EST	Birjo Rasmussen
30	GK	(Estonia) EST	Eliise Poopuu
40	GK	(Estonia) EST	Maarit Kori

== Record in UEFA competitions ==
All results (home, away and aggregate) list Levadia's goal tally first.

Competition	Round	Club	Home	Away	Aggregate
2002–03	Second qualifying round	(Czech Republic) Sparta Prague	–	0–6	–
2002–03	Second qualifying round	(Sweden) Umeå (Host)	–	0–4	–
2002–03	Second qualifying round	(Faroe Islands) Klaksvík	–	0–2	–
2003–04	First qualifying round	(Belgium) Lebeke-Aalst	–	w/o	–
2003–04	First qualifying round	(Israel) Maccabi Holon	–	1–3	–
2003–04	First qualifying round	(Slovenia) Krka Novo Mesto (Host)	–	0–1	–
2008–09	First qualifying round	(Greece) PAOK	–	0–3	–
2008–09	First qualifying round	(Poland) AZS Wrocław (Host)	–	0–4	–
2008–09	First qualifying round	(Ukraine) Naftokhimik Kalush	–	1–2	–
2009–10	Qualifying round	(Norway) Team Strømmen	–	0–5	–
2009–10	Qualifying round	(England) Everton	–	0–7	–
2009–10	Qualifying round	(Croatia) Osijek (Host)	–	4–1	–
2010–11	Qualifying round	(Iceland) Breiðablik (Host)	–	1–8	–
2010–11	Qualifying round	(France) Juvisy	–	0–12	–
2010–11	Qualifying round	(Romania) Târgu Mureş	–	1–2	–
