= 2025 Turkish Women's Cup squads =

List of players competing at the 9th edition of the Turkish Women's Cup

This article lists the squads for the 2025 Turkish Women's Cup, the 9th edition of the Turkish Women's Cup. The cup consists of a series of friendly games, and is held in Turkey from 20 to 26 February 2025. The three national teams involved in the tournament registered a squad of 23 players.

The age listed for each player is on 20 February 2025, the first day of the tournament. The numbers of caps and goals listed for each player do not include any matches played after the start of tournament. The club listed is the club for which the player last played a competitive match prior to the tournament. The nationality for each club reflects the national association (not the league) to which the club is affiliated. A flag is included for coaches that are of a different nationality than their own national team.

== Squads ==
=== Estonia ===
Coach: Aleksandra Ševoldajeva

The final squad was announced on 4 February 2025. 10 days later, Vlada Kubassova withdrew from the tournament's squad for health reasons and was replaced by Lisandra Rannasto.

No.	Pos.	Player	Date of birth (age)	Caps	Goals	Club
1	GK	Victoria Vihman	5 August 2004 (aged 20)	2	0	(Estonia) Flora
2	DF	Inna Kiss-Zlidnis (captain)	18 April 1990 (aged 34)	101	0	(Hungary) Budafok
3	DF	Siret Räämet	31 December 1999 (aged 25)	48	0	(Austria) LASK
4	MF	Liselle Palts	2 December 2005 (aged 19)	2	0	(Estonia) Flora
5	DF	Rahel Repkin	17 June 1998 (aged 26)	18	0	(Estonia) Tammeka
6	MF	Karola Purgats	6 April 2006 (aged 18)	0	0	(Estonia) Flora
7	MF	Liisa Merisalu	15 January 2002 (aged 23)	41	3	(Denmark) Thy-Thisted Q
8	MF	Helina Tarkmeel	20 September 2005 (aged 19)	1	0	(Estonia) Flora
9	MF	Katrin Kirpu	9 October 2004 (aged 20)	16	1	(Finland) Åland United
10	MF	Jaanika Volkov	20 February 2005 (aged 20)	21	0	(Austria) LASK
11	MF	Anette Salei	28 September 2005 (aged 19)	12	2	(Estonia) Tabasalu
12	GK	Katarina Elisabeth Käpa	16 March 2006 (aged 18)	1	0	(Estonia) Flora
13	GK	Liisa Liimets	4 April 2006 (aged 18)	0	0	(Estonia) Viimsi
14	MF	Lisette Tammik	14 October 1998 (aged 26)	76	16	(Estonia) Flora
15	FW	Katriin Saulus	5 July 2003 (aged 21)	5	1	(Estonia) Saku Sporting
16	DF	Kelly Rosen	23 November 1995 (aged 29)	87	1	(Estonia) Flora
19	MF	Lisandra Rannasto	13 January 2004 (aged 21)	1	0	(Estonia) Saku Sporting
20	MF	Loviise Männiste	24 February 2008 (aged 16)	0	0	(Estonia) Elva
21	DF	Eva-Maria Niit	5 February 2002 (aged 23)	13	0	(Belgium) Genk
22	FW	Kristina Teern	13 November 2004 (aged 20)	12	2	(Austria) LASK
24	MF	Valeria Liik	19 May 2003 (aged 21)	1	0	(Estonia) Tammeka
25	FW	Kirkeliis Lillemets	7 December 2005 (aged 19)	4	0	(Germany) Bayer Leverkusen
	DF	Annegret Kala	3 May 2006 (aged 18)	13	1	(Estonia) Tammeka

=== Iran ===
Coach: Maryam Azmoon

The final squad was announced on 18 February 2025.

No.	Pos.	Player	Date of birth (age)	Club
1	GK	Zahra Khajavi	8 February 1999 (aged 26)	(Iran) Bam Khatoon
3	DF	Tania Jahanshahi		(Iran) Malavan
4	DF	Melika Motevalli	6 May 1998 (aged 26)	(Iran) Sepahan
5	DF	Zeinab Abbaspour	24 June 2003 (aged 21)	(Iran) Gol Gohar Sirjan
6	MF	Zahra Sarbali	13 August 1993 (aged 31)	(Iran) Bam Khatoon
7	FW	Afsaneh Chatrenoor	14 April 1998 (aged 26)	(Iran) Bam Khatoon
8	MF	Shabnam Behesht	30 December 1998 (aged 26)	(Iran) Gol Gohar Sirjan
9	MF	Zahra Ghanbari (captain)	4 March 1992 (aged 32)	(Iran) Bam Khatoon
10	MF	Fatemeh Makhdoumi	14 February 2001 (aged 24)	(Iran) Ista Kordestan
11	FW	Negin Zandi	20 January 2004 (aged 21)	(Iran) Bam Khatoon
13	GK	Mina Nafeei	28 February 1999 (aged 25)	(Iran) Malavan
14	MF	Hasti Foroozandeh	4 April 1999 (aged 25)	(Iran) Gol Gohar Sirjan
16	MF	Mohadeseh Zolfi	16 January 2005 (aged 20)	(Iran) Ista Kordestan
17	DF	Fatemeh Shaban	4 November 2002 (aged 22)	(Iran) Ista Kordestan
19	MF	Fatemeh Adeli	16 July 1995 (aged 29)	(Iran) Sepahan
20	FW	Hajar Dabbaghi	22 March 1999 (aged 25)	(Iran) Sepahan
21	DF	Maryam Dini		(Iran) Gol Gohar Sirjan
22	GK	Raha Yazdani	22 June 1987 (aged 37)	(Iran) Sepahan
23	FW	Sara Didar	27 November 2004 (aged 20)	(Iran) Bam Khatoon
24	DF	Zahra Alizadeh		(Iran) Sepahan

=== Puerto Rico ===
Coach: (United States) Nathaniel González

The final squad was announced on 11 February 2025.

No.	Pos.	Player	Date of birth (age)	Caps	Goals	Club
1	GK	Sydney Martinez	September 12, 1999 (aged 25)	8	0	(United States) Brooklyn FC
2	DF	Verónica García	December 23, 1999 (aged 25)	11	0	(Croatia) Osijek
3	MF	Jailene de Jesus	May 10, 2003 (aged 21)	8	2	(United States) St. John's Red Storm
4	DF	Idelys Vázquez	November 17, 2000 (aged 24)	9	0	(Colombia) Cortuluá
5	DF	Madison Cox	October 24, 1995 (aged 29)	13	1	(Croatia) Osijek
6	DF	Mia Duncan		0	0	(United States) Union University Bulldogs
7	FW	Danielle Marcano	August 20, 1997 (aged 27)	4	1	(France) Nantes
8	MF	Ana Díaz	August 26, 2002 (aged 22)	3	0	(United States) Georgia State Panthers
9	FW	Gloria Douglas	May 4, 1992 (aged 32)	6	0	(Spain) Pradejón
10	MF	Nickolette Driesse (captain)	November 8, 1994 (aged 30)	14	3	(Croatia) Split
11	FW	Cristina Torres	October 3, 2000 (aged 24)	10	2	(Mexico) UNAM
12	GK	Cristina Roque	November 6, 2001 (aged 23)	4	0	(United States) Utah Royals
13	DF	Emma González	May 7, 2004 (aged 20)	3	0	(United States) San Diego Toreros
14	MF	Melanie Herrera		0	0	(United States) UNC Greensboro Spartans
15	FW	Jocelyn Chinea	August 2, 2005 (aged 19)	0	0	(United States) Georgia Bulldogs
16	FW	Indigo Sims	December 22, 2005 (aged 19)	0	0	(United States) Sam Houston Bearkats
17	DF	Imani Morlock	June 14, 1997 (aged 27)	9	0	(Australia) Mitchelton
18	MF	JoJo Cotto	January 15, 2000 (aged 25)	10	0	(United States) Downtown United
19	FW	Kennedy Garcia	February 16, 2005 (aged 20)	3	0	(United States) Alabama Crimson Tide

== Player representation ==
=== By club ===
Clubs with 3 or more players represented are listed.

Players	Club
7	(Estonia) Flora
6	(Iran) Bam Khatoon
5	(Iran) Sepahan
4	(Iran) Gol Gohar Sirjan
3	(Austria) LASK, (Estonia) Tammeka, (Iran) Ista Kordestan

=== By club nationality ===
Players	Clubs
20	Iran
15	Estonia
11	United States
3	Austria, Croatia
1	Australia, Belgium, Colombia, Denmark, Finland, France, Germany, Hungary, Mexico, Spain

=== By club federation ===
Players	Federation
28	UEFA
21	AFC
12	CONCACAF
1	CONMEBOL

=== By representatives of domestic league ===
National squad	Players
Iran	20
Estonia	15
Puerto Rico	0
