= 2022 CONCACAF W Championship qualification =

2022 CONCACAF W Championship Qualifiers
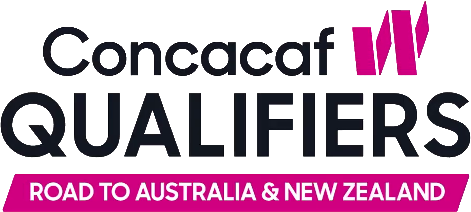

Tournament details
- Dates: 16 February – 12 April 2022
- Teams: 30 (from 1 confederation)

Tournament statistics
- Matches played: 60
- Goals scored: 362 (6.03 per match)
- Top scorer(s): (Haiti) Roselord Borgella (Nicaragua) Yessenia Flores (11 goals each)

The 2022 CONCACAF W Championship qualification competition, also known as the CONCACAF W Qualifiers, was a women's football tournament that was contested by the senior women's national teams of the member associations of CONCACAF to decide the participating teams of the 2022 CONCACAF W Championship. The qualifying matches took place in February and April 2022. A total of six teams in the qualifying competition advanced to the final tournament, joining Canada and the United States, who received byes as the top ranked teams. The 2022 CONCACAF W Championship served as the CONCACAF qualifiers to the 2023 FIFA Women's World Cup in Australia and New Zealand, as well as for the football tournament at the 2024 Summer Olympics in France.

Belize had its first international win and draw in the competition, having lost all international matches since its debut back in 2001.

== Teams ==
A total of 39 CONCACAF member associations were eligible to enter the qualifying competition, with Canada and the United States having qualified automatically for the final tournament as the top two CONCACAF teams in the FIFA Women's World Rankings of August 2020. Only 30 teams entered the competition.

Automatic qualifiers	Teams entering qualification
**Canada**; **United States**	Anguilla (Note: Not a member of the IOC, ineligible for Olympics); Antigua and Barbuda; Aruba; Barbados; Belize; Bermuda; British Virgin Islands; Cayman Islands; **Costa Rica**; Cuba; Curaçao; Dominica; Dominican Republic; El Salvador; Grenada; Guatemala; Guyana; **Haiti**; Honduras; **Jamaica**; **Mexico**; Nicaragua; **Panama**; Puerto Rico; Saint Kitts and Nevis; Saint Vincent and the Grenadines; Suriname; **Trinidad and Tobago**; Turks and Caicos Islands; U.S. Virgin Islands

Notes

- Teams in **bold** qualified for the final tournament.

Did not enter
- Bahamas
- Bonaire (Note: Not a member of FIFA or the IOC, ineligible for World Cup and Olympics)
- French Guiana
- Guadeloupe
- Martinique
- Montserrat
- Saint Lucia
- Saint Martin
- Sint Maarten

== Format ==
The qualifying competition was held in February and April 2022. Teams were drawn into six groups of five, and played two home and two away matches in a single round-robin format. Should more than thirty CONCACAF member associations have entered, a play-in round would have been held prior to the qualifying group stage. However, as 30 teams entered qualifying, this was not necessary. The six group winners advanced to the final tournament.

=== Tiebreakers ===
Teams were ranked according to points (3 points for a win, 1 point for a draw, 0 points for a loss). The rankings of teams in each group were determined as follows (regulations Articles 12.3):

1. points obtained in all group matches;
2. goal difference in all group matches;
3. number of goals scored in all group matches;

If two or more teams were equal on the basis of the above three criteria, their rankings were determined as follows:

4. points obtained in the group matches between the teams concerned;
5. goal difference in the group matches between the teams concerned;
6. number of goals scored in the group matches between the teams concerned;
7. lowest fair play points in all group matches:
  - first yellow card: plus 1 point;
  - indirect red card (second yellow card): plus 3 points;
  - direct red card: plus 4 points;
  - yellow card and direct red card: plus 5 points;
8. drawing of lots by CONCACAF.

== Draw ==
The qualification draw took place on 21 August 2021, 15:00 EDT, in Miami, United States. The 30 teams were seeded based on the FIFA Women's World Rankings of June 2021 (in parentheses). The top six teams in the ranking were pre-seeded, and automatically allocated to position 1 in order from group A to F. The remaining teams were placed into pots 1 to 4 based on ranking, with each pot containing six teams. Pot 4 contained the two lowest-ranked teams, along with four unranked teams. In the draw, teams were drawn from each pot and placed in order from group A to F. The position teams were drawn into was based on their pot: pot 1 teams were drawn into position 2, pot 2 teams into position 3, pot 3 teams into position 4 and pot 4 teams into position 5.

Pre-seeded	Pot 1	Pot 2	Pot 3	Pot 4
Mexico (28) (A1); Costa Rica (36) (B1); Jamaica (51) (C1); Panama (60) (D1); Haiti (62) (E1); Trinidad and Tobago (70) (F1)	Guatemala (80); Guyana (88); Cuba (89); Puerto Rico (107); Dominican Republic (110); El Salvador (113)	Honduras (117); Nicaragua (118); Suriname (129); Saint Kitts and Nevis (134); Barbados (138); Bermuda (139)	Saint Vincent and the Grenadines (146); Dominica (148); Grenada (151); U.S. Virgin Islands (155); Belize (158); Antigua and Barbuda (160)	Curaçao (162); Aruba (165); Anguilla (NR); British Virgin Islands (NR); Cayman Islands (NR); Turks and Caicos Islands (NR)

Notes

- NR: Not ranked

== Schedule ==
Below was the schedule of the 2022 CONCACAF W Championship qualification tournament.

On 8 October 2021, CONCACAF announced the match dates, after the first window of matches was postponed from November 2021 to February 2022 due to impacts associated with the COVID-19 pandemic.

Round	Match	Date
Window 1	2 v 4	16 February 2022
Window 1	1 v 3	17 February 2022
Window 1	5 v 2	19 February 2022
Window 1	4 v 1	20 February 2022
Window 1	3 v 5	22 February 2022
Window 2	4 v 5	6 April 2022
Window 2	2 v 3	8 April 2022
Window 2	5 v 1	9 April 2022
Window 2	3 v 4	12 April 2022
Window 2	1 v 2	12 April 2022

== Groups ==
=== Group A ===
Pos	Team	Pld	W	D	L	GF	GA	GD	Pts	Qualification	(Mexico)	(Puerto Rico)	(Suriname)	(Antigua and Barbuda)	(Anguilla)
1	Mexico	4	4	0	0	34	0	+34	12	Qualification to 2022 CONCACAF W Championship	—	6–0	9–0	—	—
2	Puerto Rico	4	3	0	1	15	6	+9	9		—	—	2–0	4–0	—
3	Suriname	4	2	0	2	10	12	−2	6		—	—	—	5–1	5–0
4	Antigua and Barbuda	4	1	0	3	2	17	−15	3		0–8	—	—	—	1–0
5	Anguilla	4	0	0	4	0	26	−26	0		0–11	0–9	—	—	—

Source: CONCACAF
Rules for classification: Tiebreakers
16 February 2022
19:00 UTC−4

Puerto Rico	4–0	Antigua and Barbuda
C. Torres 15', 45'; Suárez 22'; Socarrás 51'	Report (FIFA); Report (CONCACAF)

Estadio Centroamericano, Mayagüez
Referee: Odette Hamilton (Jamaica)
17 February 2022
20:00 UTC−6

Mexico	9–0	Suriname
Mayor 9'; Martínez 24', 33'; García 48'; Bernal 62'; Jaramillo 75'; Reyes 88'; Cervantes 89'	Report (FIFA); Report (CONCACAF)

Estadio Universitario, San Nicolás de los Garza
Referee: Myriam Marcotte (Canada)

19 February 2022
18:00 UTC−4

Anguilla	0–9	Puerto Rico
	Report (FIFA); Report (CONCACAF)	S. Richardson 7' (o.g.); Socarrás 37', 57', 64', 71'; Carty 39' (o.g.); Driesse 42', 90+1'; Suárez 75' (pen.)

Raymond E. Guishard Stadium, The Valley
Referee: Francia González (Mexico)
20 February 2022
17:00 UTC−4

Antigua and Barbuda	0–8	Mexico
	Report (FIFA); Report (CONCACAF)	Mayor 24', 33' (pen.); Bernal 27'; Cervantes 43'; Martínez 61'; Reyes 64'; Jaramillo 76'; Delgadillo 90+6'

Estadio Olímpico Félix Sánchez, Santo Domingo (Dominican Republic)
Referee: Ekaterina Koroleva (United States)

22 February 2022
19:00 UTC−3

Suriname	5–0	Anguilla
van Ommeren 25', 38', 49'; Banarsie 61' (pen.)	Report (FIFA); Report (CONCACAF)

Frank Essed Stadion, Paramaribo
Referee: Mayary Cartagena (Guatemala)

6 April 2022
16:00 UTC−4

Antigua and Barbuda	1–0	Anguilla
Jacobs 27'	Report (FIFA); Report (CONCACAF)

Sir Vivian Richards Stadium, North Sound
Referee: Natalie Simon (United States)

8 April 2022
15:45 UTC−4

Puerto Rico	2–0	Suriname
Driesse 17'; Aguilera 66'	Report (FIFA); Report (CONCACAF)

Estadio Centroamericano, Mayagüez
Referee: Marjorie Ponce (Nicaragua)
9 April 2022
16:00 UTC−4

Anguilla	0–11	Mexico
	Report (FIFA); Report (CONCACAF)	Cervantes 4', 8', 56'; Reyes 15'; Mayor 39'; Montero 53'; Ordóñez 57', 68'; López 63'; Martínez 75' (pen.), 88'

Raymond E. Guishard Stadium, The Valley
Referee: Mirian León (El Salvador)

12 April 2022
19:00 UTC−3

Suriname	5–1	Antigua and Barbuda
van Ommeren 27' (pen.); Patra 36'; Pique 90+4' (pen.)	Report (FIFA); Report (CONCACAF)	Jacobs 84' (pen.)

Frank Essed Stadion, Paramaribo
Referee: Melissa Borjas (Honduras)
12 April 2022
20:00 UTC−5

Mexico	6–0	Puerto Rico
Ovalle 13', 51'; Martínez 15'; Delgadillo 19'; Ordóñez 55'; Sánchez 90+1'	Report (FIFA); Report (CONCACAF)

Estadio Nemesio Díez, Toluca
Referee: Marianela Araya (Costa Rica)

=== Group B ===
Pos	Team	Pld	W	D	L	GF	GA	GD	Pts	Qualification	(Costa Rica)	(Saint Kitts and Nevis)	(Guatemala)	(Curaçao)	(United States Virgin Islands)
1	Costa Rica	4	4	0	0	22	0	+22	12	Qualification to 2022 CONCACAF W Championship	—	7–0	5–0	—	—
2	Saint Kitts and Nevis	4	3	0	1	13	9	+4	9		—	—	—	5–1	6–0
3	Guatemala	4	2	0	2	16	7	+9	6		—	1–2	—	—	9–0
4	Curaçao	4	1	0	3	2	15	−13	3		0–4	—	0–6	—	—
5	U.S. Virgin Islands	4	0	0	4	0	22	−22	0		0–6	—	—	0–1	—

Source: CONCACAF
Rules for classification: Tiebreakers
16 February 2022
11:00 UTC−6

Guatemala	9–0	U.S. Virgin Islands
Ramírez 25', 43'; Álvarez 44', 50'; Solórzano 49', 66'; Texaj 56'; Monterroso 70'; Herrera 79'	Report (FIFA); Report (CONCACAF)

Estadio Pensativo, Antigua
Referee: Tori Penso (United States)
17 February 2022
19:00 UTC−6

Costa Rica	7–0	Saint Kitts and Nevis
Benavides 16', 54'; P. Chinchilla 45'; Venegas 45+3'; R. Rodríguez 58'; G. Villalobos 60'; Alvarado 90+7' (pen.)	Report (FIFA); Report (CONCACAF)

Estadio Nacional, San Jose
Referee: Diana Pérez Borja (Mexico)

19 February 2022
18:00 UTC−4

Curaçao	0–6	Guatemala
	Report (FIFA); Report (CONCACAF)	G. Aguilar 8'; Monterroso 32', 40'; Álvarez 63'; Cruz 84' (pen.); Contreras 89'

Stadion Rignaal Jean Francisca, Willemstad
Referee: Karitza Guerra (Honduras)
20 February 2022
17:00 UTC−4

U.S. Virgin Islands	0–6	Costa Rica
	Report (FIFA); Report (CONCACAF)	Alvarado 5' (pen.); R. Rodríguez 17', 44'; Venegas 24'; Herrera 65'; F. Villalobos 69'

Bethlehem Soccer Stadium, Saint Croix
Referee: Katia García (Mexico)

22 February 2022
19:00 UTC−4

Saint Kitts and Nevis	5–1	Curaçao
Stokes 2'; Browne 7'; Lawrence 23', 56'; Claxton 90+3'	Report (FIFA); Report (CONCACAF)	Hansen 5'

Estadio Olímpico Félix Sánchez, Santo Domingo (Dominican Republic)
Referee: Mirian León (El Salvador)

6 April 2022
16:00 UTC−4

U.S. Virgin Islands	0–1	Curaçao
	Report (FIFA); Report (CONCACAF)	Tokaay 23'

Bethlehem Soccer Stadium, Saint Croix
Referee: Carissa Douglas-Jacob (Trinidad and Tobago)

8 April 2022
15:00 UTC−6

Guatemala	1–2	Saint Kitts and Nevis
Cruz 49'	Report (FIFA); Report (CONCACAF)	Bailey-Williams 20' (pen.); Claxton 71'

Estadio Pensativo, Antigua
Referee: Priscila Pérez Borja (Mexico)
9 April 2022
19:00 UTC−4

Curaçao	0–4	Costa Rica
	Report (FIFA); Report (CONCACAF)	R. Rodríguez 22', 28', 64'; P. Chinchilla 57'

Stadion Rignaal Jean Francisca, Willemstad
Referee: Carly Shaw-MacLaren (Canada)

12 April 2022
16:00 UTC−4

Saint Kitts and Nevis	6–0	U.S. Virgin Islands
Stokes 21'; C. Uddenberg 51'; Springer 57'; Claxton 65'; Browne 77' (pen.), 90+3'	Report (FIFA); Report (CONCACAF)

Warner Park Football Stadium, Basseterre
Referee: Neressa Goldson (Jamaica)
12 April 2022
19:00 UTC−6

Costa Rica	5–0	Guatemala
P. Chinchilla 5', 64'; Salas 29'; Granados 52'; S. Cruz 85'	Report (FIFA); Report (CONCACAF)

Estadio Nacional, San Jose
Referee: Odette Hamilton (Jamaica)

=== Group C ===
Pos	Team	Pld	W	D	L	GF	GA	GD	Pts	Qualification	(Jamaica)	(Dominican Republic)	(Bermuda)	(Cayman Islands)	(Grenada)
1	Jamaica	4	4	0	0	24	2	+22	12	Qualification to 2022 CONCACAF W Championship	—	5–1	4–0	—	—
2	Dominican Republic	4	3	0	1	15	5	+10	9		—	—	1–0	—	9–0
3	Bermuda	4	2	0	2	12	5	+7	6		—	—	—	6–0	6–0
4	Cayman Islands	4	1	0	3	2	19	−17	3		0–9	0–4	—	—	—
5	Grenada	4	0	0	4	1	23	−22	0		1–6	—	—	0–2	—

Source: CONCACAF
Rules for classification: Tiebreakers
16 February 2022
19:00 UTC−4

Dominican Republic	9–0	Grenada
Oviedo 4', 12', 52'; Heyaime 6'; Lareo 9', 68'; Kara 49'; Santa 81'; Vargas 86'	Report (FIFA); Report (CONCACAF)

Estadio Olímpico Félix Sánchez, Santo Domingo
Referee: Tatiana Guzmán (Nicaragua)
17 February 2022
19:00 UTC−5

Jamaica	4–0	Bermuda
Brown 21'; Carter 30'; Shaw 80', 90+3'	Report (FIFA); Report (CONCACAF)

National Stadium, Kingston
Referee: Astrid Gramajo (Guatemala)

19 February 2022
15:00 UTC−5

Cayman Islands	0–4	Dominican Republic
	Report (FIFA); Report (CONCACAF)	Lareo 21' (pen.); Oviedo 40'; Santa 66'; Dionicio 74'

Truman Bodden Stadium, George Town
Referee: Crystal Sobers (Trinidad and Tobago)
20 February 2022
17:00 UTC−4

Grenada	1–6	Jamaica
Frank 52'	Report (FIFA); Report (CONCACAF)	Cameron 28'; Brown 42', 55'; Shaw 45+5', 90'; Keene 73'

Kirani James Stadium, St. George's
Referee: Priscila Pérez Borja (Mexico)

22 February 2022
19:00 UTC−5

Bermuda	6–0	Cayman Islands
Nesbeth 8', 90+3'; Christopher 25', 40', 55'; Dill 66'	Report (FIFA); Report (CONCACAF)

IMG Academy, Bradenton (United States)
Referee: Cecile Hinds (Trinidad and Tobago)

6 April 2022
17:00 UTC−4

Grenada	0–2	Cayman Islands
	Report (FIFA); Report (CONCACAF)	Windsor 53'; Godet 86'

Kirani James Stadium, St. George's
Referee: Tori Penso (United States)

8 April 2022
19:00 UTC−4

Dominican Republic	1–0	Bermuda
Kara 87'	Report (FIFA); Report (CONCACAF)

Estadio Olímpico Félix Sánchez, Santo Domingo
Referee: Smeedly Saint-Jean (Haiti)
9 April 2022
19:00 UTC−5

Cayman Islands	0–9	Jamaica
	Report (FIFA); Report (CONCACAF)	Carter 7', 16', 17'; Phillips 12' (o.g.); Brown 14'; Shaw 54', 56', 65'; McCoy 88'

Truman Bodden Stadium, George Town
Referee: Melissa Borjas (Honduras)

12 April 2022
19:00 UTC−3

Bermuda	6–0	Grenada
Nesbeth 10', 56', 73' (pen.); Christopher 23' (pen.), 88'; Davis 78'	Report (FIFA); Report (CONCACAF)

Dame Flora Duffy National Sports Centre, Hamilton
Referee: Lizzet García (Mexico)
12 April 2022
18:00 UTC−5

Jamaica	5–1	Dominican Republic
Brown 16'; Carter 40'; Cameron 60'; Shaw 79', 90+3'	Report (FIFA); Report (CONCACAF)	González 24'

Sabina Park Stadium, Kingston
Referee: Tatiana Guzmán (Nicaragua)

=== Group D ===
Pos	Team	Pld	W	D	L	GF	GA	GD	Pts	Qualification	(Panama)	(El Salvador)	(Belize)	(Barbados)	(Aruba)
1	Panama	4	4	0	0	24	0	+24	12	Qualification to 2022 CONCACAF W Championship	—	2–0	—	5–0	—
2	El Salvador	4	3	0	1	15	3	+12	9		—	—	6–0	2–0	—
3	Belize	4	1	1	2	4	15	−11	4		0–8	—	—	—	1–1
4	Barbados	4	1	0	3	3	11	−8	3		—	—	0–3	—	3–1
5	Aruba	4	0	1	3	3	20	−17	1		0–9	1–7	—	—	—

Source: CONCACAF
Rules for classification: Tiebreakers
16 February 2022
15:30 UTC−6

El Salvador	6–0	Belize
López 4'; Rodríguez 23', 45+1', 67'; Cerén 55'; K. Reyes 75'	Report (FIFA); Report (CONCACAF)

Estadio Cuscatlán, San Salvador
Referee: Natalie Simon (United States)
17 February 2022
20:00 UTC−5

Panama	5–0	Barbados
Pinzón 41' (pen.); Riley 45+1', 47'; Batista 84' (pen.); Castillo 90+5'	Report (FIFA); Report (CONCACAF)

Estadio Rommel Fernández, Panama City
Referee: Melissa Borjas (Honduras)

19 February 2022
18:30 UTC−4

Aruba	1–7	El Salvador
Luperon 90'	Report (FIFA); Report (CONCACAF)	Cerén 56'; López 65', 66', 90+3'; Sánchez 70'; García 80'; K. Reyes 90+2' (pen.)

Estadio Panamericano, San Cristóbal (Dominican Republic)
Referee: Marjorie Ponce (Nicaragua)
20 February 2022
15:00 UTC−6

Belize	0–8	Panama
	Report (FIFA); Report (CONCACAF)	Pinzón 11' (pen.); Mills 16', 71'; Cedeño 25' (pen.), 36', 86'; De León 45'; Fuentes 52'

Estadio Cuscatlán, San Salvador (El Salvador)
Referee: Neressa Goldson (Jamaica)

22 February 2022
19:00 UTC−4

Barbados	3–1	Aruba
Toppin-Herbert 4'; Cyrus 34' (pen.); Burnett-Griffith 90'	Report (FIFA); Report (CONCACAF)	Susanna 68'

Estadio Panamericano, San Cristóbal (Dominican Republic)
Referee: Carly Shaw-MacLaren (Canada)

6 April 2022
16:00 UTC−6

Belize	1–1	Aruba
Bowden 33' (pen.)	Report (FIFA); Report (CONCACAF)	Susanna 24' (pen.)

FFB Stadium, Belmopan
Referee: Merlin Soto (Honduras)

8 April 2022
15:30 UTC−6

El Salvador	2–0	Barbados
López 1'; Yard 16' (o.g.)	Report (FIFA); Report (CONCACAF)

Estadio Cuscatlán, San Salvador
Referee: Saphire Stockman (Costa Rica)
9 April 2022
16:00 UTC−6

Aruba	0–9	Panama
	Report (FIFA); Report (CONCACAF)	Batista 8', 19', 45'; Riley 30'; Rangel 34'; Cox 44' (pen.), 64'; Hernández 55'; Leonards 68'

FFB Stadium, Belmopan (Belize)
Referee: Diana Pérez Borja (Mexico)

12 April 2022
15:30 UTC−6

Barbados	0–3	Belize
	Report (FIFA); Report (CONCACAF)	Casimiro 38'; Brown 55', 90+4'

Estadio Cuscatlán, San Salvador (El Salvador)
Referee: Tori Penso (United States)
12 April 2022
20:00 UTC−5

Panama	2–0	El Salvador
De León 65'; Riley 78'	Report (FIFA); Report (CONCACAF)

Estadio Rommel Fernández, Panama City
Referee: Ekaterina Koroleva (United States)

=== Group E ===
Pos	Team	Pld	W	D	L	GF	GA	GD	Pts	Qualification	(Haiti)	(Cuba)	(Honduras)	(Saint Vincent and the Grenadines)	(British Virgin Islands)
1	Haiti	4	4	0	0	44	0	+44	12	Qualification to 2022 CONCACAF W Championship	—	6–0	6–0	—	—
2	Cuba	4	2	1	1	17	6	+11	7		—	—	0–0	3–0	—
3	Honduras	4	2	1	1	6	7	−1	7		—	—	—	2–1	4–0
4	Saint Vincent and the Grenadines	4	1	0	3	6	17	−11	3		0–11	—	—	—	5–1
5	British Virgin Islands	4	0	0	4	1	44	−43	0		0–21	0–14	—	—	—

Source: CONCACAF
Rules for classification: Tiebreakers
16 February 2022
15:00 UTC−5

Cuba	3–0	Saint Vincent and the Grenadines
Lee 19'; Moreno 35'; Peláez 74'	Report (FIFA); Report (CONCACAF)

Estadio Antonio Maceo, Santiago de Cuba
Referee: Smeedly Saint-Jean (Haiti)
17 February 2022
17:00 UTC−4

Haiti	6–0	Honduras
Surpris 15'; K. Louis 20'; B. Louis 33' (pen.), 50'; Borgella 42'; Jeudy 56'	Report (FIFA); Report (CONCACAF)

Estadio Olímpico Félix Sánchez, Santo Domingo (Dominican Republic)
Referee: Danielle Chesky (United States)

19 February 2022
15:30 UTC−6

British Virgin Islands	0–14	Cuba
	Report (FIFA); Report (CONCACAF)	Peláez 10', 23', 45'; Lee 26', 32', 39', 56', 63', 83'; Valdez 57', 79'; Pérez 68'; Palma 77'; Núñez 87'

Estadio General Francisco Morazán, San Pedro Sula (Honduras)
Referee: Miranada Cibeles (El Salvador)
20 February 2022
15:00 UTC−5

Saint Vincent and the Grenadines	0–11	Haiti
	Report (FIFA); Report (CONCACAF)	Borgella 20', 51', 76', 90'; Jeudy 22'; K. Louis 34' (pen.); Pierre-Jerome 44', 65'; Moryl 61'; Surpris 80'; Éloissaint 81'

Estadio Antonio Maceo, Santiago de Cuba (Cuba)
Referee: Suleimy Linares (Cuba)

22 February 2022
15:30 UTC−6

Honduras	4–0	British Virgin Islands
Díaz 27'; Moncada 47'; Haylock 75'; López 77'	Report (FIFA); Report (CONCACAF)

Estadio General Francisco Morazán, San Pedro Sula
Referee: Lizzet García (Mexico)

6 April 2022
15:00 UTC−4

Saint Vincent and the Grenadines	5–1	British Virgin Islands
A. Richards 7'; Hooper 14'; Wyllie 33'; Delpeche 66'; K. Richards 90+3'	Report (FIFA); Report (CONCACAF)	K. Richards 61' (o.g.)

Arnos Vale Stadium, Kingstown
Referee: Crystal Sobers (Trinidad and Tobago)

8 April 2022
15:00 UTC−5

Cuba	0–0	Honduras
	Report (FIFA); Report (CONCACAF)

Estadio Antonio Maceo, Santiago de Cuba
Referee: Karen Hernández (Mexico)
9 April 2022
16:00 UTC−4

British Virgin Islands	0–21	Haiti
	Report (FIFA); Report (CONCACAF)	Borgella 4', 21', 22', 45'; Etienne 6'; Dumornay 8', 11', 32'; B. Louis 33', 39', 42', 58', 89'; Mondésir 51'; Éloissant 63', 73', 79'; K. Louis 77' (pen.); Saint-Félix 84', 87', 90'

A. O. Shirley Recreation Ground, Road Town
Referee: Mayary Cartagena (Guatemala)

12 April 2022
15:30 UTC−6

Honduras	2–1	Saint Vincent and the Grenadines
Haylock 26'; García 53' (pen.)	Report (FIFA); Report (CONCACAF)	Creese 45+2'

Estadio General Francisco Morazán, San Pedro Sula
Referee: Myriam Marcotte (Canada)
12 April 2022
18:00 UTC−4

Haiti	6–0	Cuba
Mondésir 23'; Borgella 53' (pen.), 74'; Dumornay 64'; B. Louis 72'; Mena 88' (o.g.)	Report (FIFA); Report (CONCACAF)

Estadio Olímpico Félix Sánchez, Santo Domingo (Dominican Republic)
Referee: Katia García (Mexico)

=== Group F ===
Pos	Team	Pld	W	D	L	GF	GA	GD	Pts	Qualification	(Trinidad and Tobago)	(Guyana)	(Nicaragua)	(Dominica)	(Turks and Caicos Islands)
1	Trinidad and Tobago	4	3	1	0	19	3	+16	10	Qualification to 2022 CONCACAF W Championship	—	2–2	2–1	—	—
2	Guyana	4	2	2	0	13	2	+11	8		—	—	0–0	4–0	—
3	Nicaragua	4	2	1	1	30	2	+28	7		—	—	—	10–0	19–0
4	Dominica	4	1	0	3	8	17	−9	3		0–2	—	—	—	8–1
5	Turks and Caicos Islands	4	0	0	4	1	47	−46	0		0–13	0–7	—	—	—

Source: CONCACAF
Rules for classification: Tiebreakers
16 February 2022
20:00 UTC−4

Guyana	4–0	Dominica
Alfred 17'; Vincent 26'; Cummings 35'; Stoute 63' (o.g.)	Report (FIFA); Report (CONCACAF)

National Track and Field Leonora, Leonora
Referee: Katia García (Mexico)
17 February 2022
15:00 UTC−4

Trinidad and Tobago	2–1	Nicaragua
James 17'; Ka. Forbes 64'	Report (FIFA); Report (CONCACAF)	Y. Flores 90+5'

Hasely Crawford Stadium, Port of Spain
Referee: Lizzet García (Mexico)

19 February 2022
19:00 UTC−5

Turks and Caicos Islands	0–7	Guyana
	Report (FIFA); Report (CONCACAF)	Hazlewood 10', 40'; Baptiste 30', 72'; El-Masri 48', 61', 84'

TCIFA National Academy, Providenciales
Referee: Karen Hernández (Mexico)
20 February 2022
17:00 UTC−4

Dominica	0–2	Trinidad and Tobago
	Report (FIFA); Report (CONCACAF)	James 31'; Serrant 58'

National Track and Field Leonora, Leonora (Guyana)
Referee: Mayary Cartagena (Guatemala)

22 February 2022
19:00 UTC−6

Nicaragua	19–0	Turks and Caicos Islands
Aguirre 7'; Pérez 13', 45'; Y. Flores 17', 25', 47', 55', 64', 66'; Humphreys 33'; Rivera 39'; Moreno 50'; Orellana 51'; S. Flores 57'; Márquez 71'; N. Silva 76'; Hernández 79'; Gilday 90', 90+1'	Report (FIFA); Report (CONCACAF)

Estadio Nacional de Fútbol, Managua
Referee: Annays Rosario (Puerto Rico)

6 April 2022
15:00 UTC−4

Dominica	8–1	Turks and Caicos Islands
K. Samuel 11'; Humphreys 32', 46', 48'; S. Finn 33', 40'; Bertrand 84'; Briyan. Philip 90'	Report (FIFA); Report (CONCACAF)	Delphin 45+2'

Windsor Park, Roseau
Referee: Astrid Gramajo (Guatemala)

8 April 2022
20:00 UTC−4

Guyana	0–0	Nicaragua
	Report (FIFA); Report (CONCACAF)

National Track and Field Leonora, Leonora
Referee: Sandra Benítez (El Salvador)
9 April 2022
15:30 UTC−4

Turks and Caicos Islands	0–13	Trinidad and Tobago
	Report (FIFA); Report (CONCACAF)	Ralph 6', 17', 82'; Hutchinson 14'; Ka. Forbes 33', 45'; Stoute 35'; Hinds 41'; Matouk 49', 66'; Campbell 72' (pen.), 86'; Serrant 75'

TCIFA National Academy, Providenciales
Referee: Annays Rosario (Puerto Rico)

12 April 2022
18:00 UTC−4

Trinidad and Tobago	2–2	Guyana
James 48' (pen.); Hutchinson 90'	Report (FIFA); Report (CONCACAF)	Cummings 45', 82'

Dwight Yorke Stadium, Bacolet
Referee: Francia González (Mexico)
12 April 2022
18:00 UTC−6

Nicaragua	10–0	Dominica
Y. Flores 2', 19', 31', 53'; Rivera 14'; Gilday 25'; Hernández 49'; N. Silva 58'; Humphreys 71'; M. Silva 87'	Report (FIFA); Report (CONCACAF)

Estadio Nacional de Fútbol, Managua
Referee: Karitza Guerra (Honduras)

== Goalscorers ==
There were 362 goals scored in 60 matches, for an average of 6.03 goals per match.

11 goals

- (Haiti) Roselord Borgella
- (Nicaragua) Yessenia Flores

9 goals

- (Jamaica) Khadija Shaw

8 goals

- (Haiti) Batcheba Louis

7 goals

- (Cuba) Yeranis Lee

6 goals

- (Costa Rica) Raquel Rodríguez
- (Mexico) Katty Martínez

5 goals

- (Bermuda) Nia Christopher
- (Bermuda) LeiLanni Nesbeth
- (El Salvador) Yoselyn López
- (Jamaica) Jody Brown
- (Jamaica) Trudi Carter
- (Mexico) Alicia Cervantes
- (Puerto Rico) Karina Socarrás

4 goals

- (Costa Rica) Priscila Chinchilla
- (Cuba) Rachel Peláez
- (Dominican Republic) Alyssa Oviedo
- (Haiti) Melchie Dumornay
- (Haiti) Roseline Éloissant
- (Mexico) Stephany Mayor
- (Panama) Laurie Batista
- (Panama) Karla Riley
- (Suriname) Ravalcheny van Ommeren

3 goals

- (Dominica) Starr Humphreys
- (Dominican Republic) Manuela Lareo
- (El Salvador) Mara Rodríguez
- (Guatemala) Andrea Álvarez
- (Guatemala) María Monterroso
- (Guyana) Sydney Cummings
- (Guyana) Mariam El-Masri
- (Haiti) Kethna Louis
- (Haiti) Mikerline Saint-Félix
- (Mexico) Diana Ordóñez
- (Mexico) Maricarmen Reyes
- (Nicaragua) Jaclyn Gilday
- (Panama) Lineth Cedeño
- (Puerto Rico) Nickolette Driesse
- (Saint Kitts and Nevis) Phoenetia Browne
- (Saint Kitts and Nevis) Jahzara Claxton
- (Trinidad and Tobago) Karyn Forbes
- (Trinidad and Tobago) Asha James
- (Trinidad and Tobago) Chelcy Ralph

2 goals

- (Antigua and Barbuda) Kai Jacobs
- (Aruba) Vanessa Susanna
- (Belize) Jayda Brown
- (Costa Rica) Katherine Alvarado
- (Costa Rica) Mariana Benavides
- (Costa Rica) Carolina Venegas
- (Cuba) Eliane Valdez
- (Dominica) Sari Finn
- (Dominican Republic) Vanessa Kara
- (Dominican Republic) Winifer Santa
- (El Salvador) Brenda Cerén
- (El Salvador) Karen Reyes
- (Guatemala) Celsa Cruz
- (Guatemala) Leslie Ramírez
- (Guatemala) Aisha Solórzano
- (Guyana) Hannah Baptiste
- (Guyana) Cameo Hazlewood
- (Haiti) Sherly Jeudy
- (Haiti) Nérilia Mondésir
- (Haiti) Milan Pierre-Jerome
- (Haiti) Chelsea Surpris
- (Honduras) Kendra Haylock
- (Jamaica) Tiffany Cameron
- (Mexico) Rebeca Bernal
- (Mexico) Myra Delgadillo
- (Mexico) Carolina Jaramillo
- (Mexico) Jacqueline Ovalle
- (Nicaragua) Reyna Hernández
- (Nicaragua) Yorcelly Humphreys
- (Nicaragua) Kesly Pérez
- (Nicaragua) Lilieth Rivera
- (Nicaragua) Nathaly Silva
- (Panama) Marta Cox
- (Panama) Yerenis De León
- (Panama) Natalia Mills
- (Panama) Yomira Pinzón
- (Puerto Rico) Laura Suárez
- (Puerto Rico) Cristina Torres
- (Saint Kitts and Nevis) Brittney Lawrence
- (Saint Kitts and Nevis) Ellie Stokes
- (Trinidad and Tobago) Raenah Campbell
- (Trinidad and Tobago) Lauryn Hutchinson
- (Trinidad and Tobago) Maya Matouk
- (Trinidad and Tobago) Maria-Frances Serrant

1 goal

- (Aruba) Kiomy Luperon
- (Belize) Mikhaila Bowden
- (Belize) Shendra Casimiro
- (Barbados) Cheyanna Burnett-Griffith
- (Barbados) Rianna Cyrus
- (Barbados) Soraya Toppin-Herbert
- (Bermuda) Victoria Davis
- (Bermuda) Keunna Dill
- (Cayman Islands) Neesah Godet
- (Cayman Islands) Shayana Windsor
- (Costa Rica) Shirley Cruz
- (Costa Rica) Cristín Granados
- (Costa Rica) Melissa Herrera
- (Costa Rica) María Salas
- (Costa Rica) Fabiola Villalobos
- (Costa Rica) Gloriana Villalobos
- (Cuba) Laura Moreno
- (Cuba) Eunises Núñez
- (Cuba) Yerly Palma
- (Cuba) María Pérez
- (Curaçao) Taïsha Hansen
- (Curaçao) Riesmarly Tokaay
- (Dominica) Kylee Bertrand
- (Dominica) Briyanna Philip
- (Dominica) Kasika Samuel
- (Dominican Republic) Giovanna Dionicio
- (Dominican Republic) Kathrynn González
- (Dominican Republic) Daphne Heyaime
- (Dominican Republic) Angelina Vargas
- (El Salvador) Stephanie García
- (El Salvador) Victoria Sánchez
- (Grenada) Roneisha Frank
- (Guatemala) Gloria Aguilar
- (Guatemala) María Contreras
- (Guatemala) Vivian Herrera
- (Guatemala) Elisa Texaj
- (Guyana) Shanice Alfred
- (Guyana) Annalisa Vincent
- (Haiti) Danielle Etienne
- (Haiti) Maudeline Moryl
- (Honduras) Kimberly Díaz
- (Honduras) Gabriela García
- (Honduras) Linda Moncada
- (Honduras) Kimberly López
- (Jamaica) Alika Keene
- (Jamaica) Kayla McCoy
- (Mexico) Diana García
- (Mexico) Jimena López
- (Mexico) Casandra Montero
- (Mexico) María Sánchez
- (Nicaragua) Jansy Aguirre
- (Nicaragua) Sheyla Flores
- (Nicaragua) Nuria Márquez
- (Nicaragua) Lisbeth Moreno
- (Nicaragua) Natalie Orellana
- (Nicaragua) Martha Silva
- (Panama) Katherine Castillo
- (Panama) Yeisi Fuentes
- (Panama) Érika Hernández
- (Panama) Gabriela Villagrand
- (Panama) Kenia Rangel
- (Puerto Rico) Jill Aguilera
- (Saint Kitts and Nevis) Iyanla Bailey-Williams
- (Saint Kitts and Nevis) Caroline Springer
- (Saint Kitts and Nevis) Cloey Uddenberg
- (Saint Vincent and the Grenadines) Denella Creese
- (Saint Vincent and the Grenadines) Dionte Delpeche
- (Saint Vincent and the Grenadines) Areka Hooper
- (Saint Vincent and the Grenadines) Annesta Richards
- (Saint Vincent and the Grenadines) Kitanna Richards
- (Saint Vincent and the Grenadines) Kristiane Wyllie
- (Suriname) Amy Banarsie
- (Suriname) Katoucha Patra
- (Suriname) Naomi Pique
- (Trinidad and Tobago) Liana Hinds
- (Trinidad and Tobago) Cecily Stoute
- (Turks and Caicos Islands) Kadine Delphin

1 own goal

- (Anguilla) Ianisha Carty (against Puerto Rico)
- (Anguilla) Shadwa Richardson (against Puerto Rico)
- (Barbados) Alyssa Yard (against El Salvador)
- (Cayman Islands) Tamoy Phillips (against Jamaica)
- (Cuba) Yarisleidy Mena (against Haiti)
- (Dominica) Britney Stoute (against Guyana)
- (Saint Vincent and the Grenadines) Kitanna Richards (against British Virgin Islands)

== Qualified teams ==
The following eight teams qualified for the final tournament.

Team	Qualified as	Qualified on	Previous appearances in CONCACAF W Championship^{1}
Canada	Automatic qualifiers	10 December 2020	9 (1991, 1993, 1994, **1998**, 2000, 2002, 2006, **2010**, 2018)
United States	Automatic qualifiers	10 December 2020	9 (**1991**, **1993**, **1994**, **2000**, **2002**, **2006**, 2010, **2014**, **2018**)
Mexico	Qualification Group A winner	12 April 2022	9 (1991, 1994, 1998, 2000, 2002, 2006, 2010, 2014, 2018)
Costa Rica	Qualification Group B winner	12 April 2022	7 (1991, 1998, 2000, 2002, 2010, 2014, 2018)
Jamaica	Qualification Group C winner	12 April 2022	6 (1991, 1994, 2002, 2006, 2014, 2018)
Panama	Qualification Group D winner	12 April 2022	3 (2002, 2006, 2018)
Haiti	Qualification Group E winner	12 April 2022	5 (1991, 1998, 2002, 2010, 2014)
Trinidad and Tobago	Qualification Group F winner	12 April 2022	10 (1991, 1993, 1994, 1998, 2000, 2002, 2006, 2010, 2014, 2018)

^{1} Bold indicates champions for that year. Italic indicates hosts for that year.
