= Renate-Ly Mehevets =

Estonian footballer

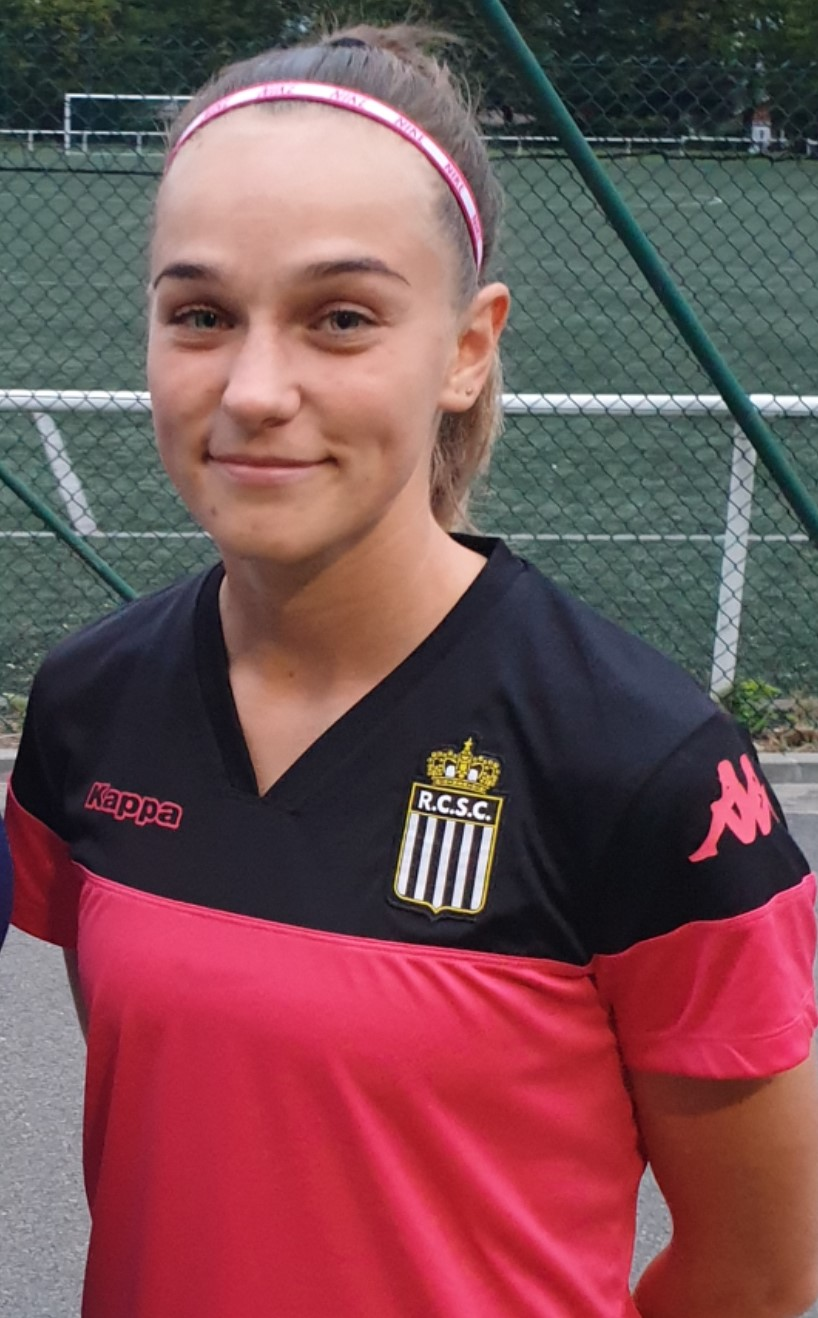
- (2021)

Personal information
- Date of birth: 2 March 1999 (age 27)
- Place of birth: Põlva, Estonia
- Positions: Right back; winger

Team information
- Current team: Paide Linnanaiskond
- Number: 8

Youth career
- Põlva FC Lootos

Senior career*
Years	Team	Apps	(Gls)
2014–2015	Põlva FC Lootos	31	(7)
2016–2020	Tammeka	83	(14)
2016–2018	Tammeka II	7	(1)
2020–2021	Charleroi	24	(1)
2021–2023	Tartu JK Tammeka	44	(22)
2024	Saku Sporting	25	(6)
2025–	Paide Linnanaiskond	41	(26)

International career^{‡}
2014–2015	Estonia U-17	23	(2)
2017	Estonia U-19	8	(0)
2019–	Estonia	23	(0)
- * Club domestic league appearances and goals as of 3 September 2025 ‡ National team caps and goals as of 3 September 2025

Renate-Ly Mehevets (born 2 March 1999) is an Estonian international footballer who plays for Paide Linnanaiskond and the Estonia women's national team.

== Club career ==
Mehevets began her senior career with Põlva FC Lootos, making her debut in 2014 in the Naiste Teine liiga. She continued with the club in 2015, helping them compete in the Naiste Esiliiga.

Later in 2015, she joined Tartu JK Tammeka, initially featuring for both the first team and the club's reserve side. She made her Meistriliiga debut in 2016 and became a regular member of the first team over the following seasons, while also making occasional appearances for the club's second team.

In summer 2020, Mehevets signed a one-season contract with the Belgian team Charleroi and became the first Estonian player in the Belgian Women's Super League.

In 2021, she returned to Tartu, where she remained until the end of the 2023 season. On 3 June 2023, Mehevets played in the Estonian Women's Cup final for Tartu JK Tammeka against Saku Sporting at the A. Le Coq Arena in Tallinn. Tammeka lost the match 1–0, with the only goal coming from an own goal by Eva-Maria Niit in the 69th minute.

In 2024, she joined Saku Sporting, where she made 24 league appearances and scored five goals in the Meistriliiga.

In 2025, Mehevets signed for Paide Linnanaiskond, playing in the Naiste Teine liiga. She scored 20 goals in 14 league matches.

Ahead of the 2026 season, Mehevets remained with Paide Linnanaiskond following the club's promotion to the Naiste Meistriliiga. As team captain, she helped Paide reach the Estonian Women's Cup final for the first time in the club's history. In the final against Saku Sporting on 23 May 2026 at Pärnu Rannastaadion, Mehevets opened the scoring in the third minute, converting a pass from Annegret Kala following a short corner. However, Sporting recovered to win 4–1, leaving Mehevets a cup runner-up for the second time in her career, having previously lost the 2023 final with Tammeka.

On 8 November 2026, Mehevets captained Paide Linnanaiskond to their first Naiste Meistriliiga championship, secured with a 3–1 victory over Harju JK Laagri in the final match of the season. The title was won in Paide's debut season in the top division and marked the first Estonian senior national championship in the history of Paide Linnameeskond. It also ended Tallinna FC Flora's eight-year dominance of the competition. Following the match, Mehevets credited the team's unity and determination for the historic achievement.

=== Honours ===
Tartu JK Tammeka

- Estonian Women's Cup
  - Runner-up: 2023

Paide Linnanaiskond

- Naiste Meistriliiga
  - Winner: 2026
- Estonian Women's Cup
  - Runner-up: 2026

== International career ==
She made her debut for the Estonian national team on 3 April 2019 against Azerbaijan, coming on as a substitute for Liisa Merisalu.

As of May 2026, she has made 23 appearances for the national team.

== Career statistics ==
=== Club ===
Club	Season	League			National cup		Total	
Club	Season	Division	Apps	Goals	Apps	Goals	Apps	Goals
Põlva FC Lootos	2014	Naiste Teine liiga	12	0	1	1	13	1
Põlva FC Lootos	2015	Naiste Esiliiga	14	4	4	2	18	6
Tartu JK Tammeka II	2015	Naiste Teine liiga	2	4			2	4
Tartu JK Tammeka	2016	Naiste Meistriliiga	16	4			16	4
Tartu JK Tammeka II	2016	Naiste Esiliiga	3	1			3	1
Tartu JK Tammeka	2017	Naiste Meistriliiga	11	1	2	1	13	1
Tartu JK Tammeka II	2017	Naiste Teine liiga	2	3			2	3
Tartu JK Tammeka	2018	Naiste Meistriliiga	19	3	2	0	21	3
Tartu JK Tammeka II	2018	Naiste Teine liiga	1	0			1	0
Tartu JK Tammeka	2019	Naiste Meistriliiga	19	3	1	0	20	3
Tartu JK Tammeka	2020	Naiste Meistriliiga	11	1			11	1
Charleroi	2020/2021	Belgian Women's Super League	24	1			24	1
Tartu JK Tammeka	2021	Naiste Meistriliiga	2	0			2	0
Tartu JK Tammeka	2022	Naiste Meistriliiga	13	11	2	3	15	14
Tartu JK Tammeka	2023	Naiste Meistriliiga	24	8	3	0	27	8
Saku Sporting	2024	Naiste Meistriliiga	24	5	2	0	26	5
Paide Linnanaiskond	2025	Naiste Teine liiga	14	20	1	0	15	20
Paide Linnanaiskond	2026	Naiste Meistriliiga	23	4	3	2	26	6
Total			234	73	21	9	255	82

=== Youth international career ===
Team	Years	Apps	Goals
Estonia U17	2014–2015	23	2
Estonia U19	2016–2017	8	0

=== Appearances and goals by national team and year ===
Year	Apps	Goals
2019	3	0
2020	6	0
2021	1	0
2022	4	0
2023	9	0
Total	23	0
