= Myra Delgadillo =

Mexican footballer (born 1995)

Personal information
- Full name: Myra Alexandra Delgadillo Prado
- Date of birth: 9 December 1995 (age 30)
- Place of birth: Union City, California, U.S.
- Height: 1.75 m (5 ft 9 in)
- Position: Forward

Team information
- Current team: UANL
- Number: 14

College career
Years	Team	Apps	(Gls)
2014–2017	Fresno State Bulldogs	72	(19)

Senior career*
Years	Team	Apps	(Gls)
2018	Fresno FC Ladies		
2019	Seattle Stars FC		
2019–2020	Spartak Subotica		
2020–2022	Braga	24	(12)
2022–2023	Juárez	24	(5)
2023–2024	Monterrey	47	(14)
2025	Pachuca	39	(12)
2026–	UANL	16	(1)

International career^{‡}
2021–	Mexico	5	(1)
- * Club domestic league appearances and goals as of 10 October 2021. ‡ National team caps and goals as of 26 October 2021.

Myra Alexandra Delgadillo Prado (born 9 December 1995) is a professional footballer who plays as a forward for Liga MX Femenil club Tigres UANL. Born in the United States, she plays for the Mexico national team.

== Early life ==
Delgadillo was born in Union City, California. She attended James Logan High School, captaining the varsity girls' soccer team for three years.

== Club career ==
=== Fresno FC Ladies ===
In 2018, Delgadillo played for Fresno FC Ladies in the Women's Premier Soccer League.

=== Seattle Stars FC ===
In early 2019, Delgadillo played for the Seattle Stars FC in the Northwest Premier League.

=== ŽFK Spartak Subotica ===
In June 2019, Delgadillo joined Serbian Women's Super League side ŽFK Spartak Subotica.

=== S.C. Braga ===
In July 2020, Delgadillo signed with Campeonato Nacional Feminino side S.C. Braga.

== International career ==
On 23 October 2021, Delgadillo made her debut for the Mexico national team in a 6–1 victory over Argentina at Estadio Gregorio "Tepa" Gómez.

== International goals ==
No.	Date	Venue	Opponent	Score	Result	Competition
1.	20 February 2022	Estadio Olímpico Félix Sánchez, Santo Domingo, Dominican Republic	Antigua and Barbuda	0–8	0–8	2022 CONCACAF W Championship qualification
2.	12 April 2022	Estadio Nemesio Díez, Toluca, Mexico	Puerto Rico	3–0	6–0	2022 CONCACAF W Championship qualification
3.	30 May 2025	Estadio Universitario BUAP, Puebla, Mexico	Uruguay	1–0	2–2	Friendly
