= Leslie Ramírez =

Professional footballer (born 1996)

Personal information
- Full name: Leslie Stephanie Ramírez Pérez
- Birth name: Leslie Stephanie Ramirez
- Date of birth: 11 January 1996 (age 30)
- Place of birth: Los Angeles, California, U.S.
- Height: 1.70 m (5 ft 7 in)
- Position: Forward

Team information
- Current team: WFC Lanchkhuti

Youth career
- 2000–2013: Real So Cal Soccer Club
- 2010–2014: El Camino Real Conquistadores

College career
| Years | Team | Apps | (Gls) |
| 2014–2015 | Cal State Northridge Matadors | 0 | (0) |
| 2016 | Los Angeles Pierce Brahmas | | (10) |
| 2017–2019 | Cal State Los Angeles Golden Eagles | 48 | (4) |

Senior career*
| Years | Team | Apps | (Gls) |
| 2020–2021 | Invictus Club Feminae | | |
| 2021 | ŽFK Mašinac Trace | 9 | (7) |
| 2022 | Guadalajara | 3 | (0) |
| 2023 | Cruz Azul | 3 | (1) |
| 2024– | WFC Lanchkhuti | | |

International career^{‡}
| 2022– | Guatemala | 2 | (2) |
- * Club domestic league appearances and goals as of 18 July 2022 ‡ National team caps and goals as of 19 February 2022

Leslie Stephanie Ramírez Pérez (born 11 January 1996) is a professional footballer who plays as a forward for Georgian Women's Championship club WFC Lanchkhuti. Born in the United States, she represents Guatemala at international level. She also holds Mexican citizenship.

== Early life ==
Ramírez was born in Los Angeles, California, United States and raised in Reseda, California. Her father was born in San Miguel de Allende, Guanajuato, Mexico and her late mother in Guatemala City, Guatemala. She has attended the El Camino Real Charter High School.

== College career ==
Ramírez has attended the California State University, Northridge, the Los Angeles Pierce College and the California State University, Los Angeles in the United States.

== Club career ==
Ramírez has played for Invictus Club Feminae in the United States and for ŽFK Mašinac Trace in Serbia.

On 26 February 2022, Ramírez was officially announced as a new player of Mexican nationalist club Guadalajara. Her signing was questioned by some media since she is cap-tied to Guatemala and therefore no longer eligible to represent Mexico, an apparent premise to be able to play for Guadalajara (it was a policy during the administration of the late Jorge Vergara). However, her hiring was defended by current club board which has claimed that, according to the current statutes, there is no restrictions concerning foreign national teams, with the only condition being that "only Mexicans by birth can play", including foreign-born people with a Mexican parent, which it's her case, so she was not asked by them to retire from her international career with Guatemala.

== International career ==
Ramírez made her senior debut for Guatemala on 16 February 2022, starting in a 9–0 home win over the United States Virgin Islands during the 2022 CONCACAF W Championship qualification.

== International goals ==
| No. | Date | Venue | Opponent | Score | Result | Competition |
|---|---|---|---|---|---|---|
| 1. | 29 October 2023 | Independence Park, Kingston, Jamaica | Jamaica | 1–0 | 2–2 | 2024 CONCACAF W Gold Cup qualification |
