= Soraya Toppin-Herbert =

Barbadian footballer

Personal information
- Date of birth: 7 January 1994 (age 32)
- Height: 1.60 m (5 ft 3 in)
- Position: Midfielder

Youth career
- 2007–2010: Phil-Mont Falcons
- FC Delco

College career
Years	Team	Apps	(Gls)
2011–2014	Purdue Boilermakers	45	(2)

Senior career*
Years	Team	Apps	(Gls)
- UWI Blackbirds

International career^{‡}
	Barbados U20	7	(1)
2010–?	Barbados	9	(1)
- * Club domestic league appearances and goals as of 1 November 2014 ‡ National team caps and goals as of 22 February 2022

Soraya Toppin-Herbert (born 7 January 1994) is a Barbadian footballer who plays as a midfielder for the Barbados women's national team. She currently serves as the Director of Women’s Football for the Bahamas Football Association.

== Early life ==
Toppin-Herbert was raised in Saint James. She has attended the Queen's College in Barbados and the Philadelphia-Montgomery Christian Academy in the United States.

== College career ==
Toppin-Herbert has attended the Purdue University in the United States.

== Club career ==
Toppin-Herbert has played for UWI Blackbirds in Barbados.

== International career ==
Toppin-Herbert capped for Barbados at senior level during two CONCACAF W Championship qualifications (2010 and 2022) and the 2020 CONCACAF Women's Olympic Qualifying Championship qualification.

== Administrative career ==
In December 2021, she was named Director of Women's Football with the Bahamas Football Association.
