= Winifer Santa =

Dominican footballer (born 1998)

Personal information
- Full name: Winifer Santa Campo
- Date of birth: 9 July 1998 (age 28)
- Place of birth: Santo Domingo, Dominican Republic
- Height: 1.66 m (5 ft 5 in)
- Position: Centre forward

Team information
- Current team: Torrelodones

Senior career*
Years	Team	Apps	(Gls)
2017–2019	Betis San Isidro		
2019–2020	Rayo Vallecano B		
2020–202?	Getafe Femenino		
202?–	Torrelodones		

International career
- Dominican Republic U20
2021–	Dominican Republic	1	(0)
- * Club domestic league appearances and goals as of 17 November 2017.

Winifer Santa Campo (born 9 July 1998), simply known as Winifer in Spain, is a Dominican footballer who plays as a centre forward for Spanish Tercera Federación club Torrelodones CF and the Dominican Republic women's national team.

== Early life ==
Santa was born in Santo Domingo.

== Club career ==
Santa has played for CD Betis San Isidro, Rayo Vallecano B and CD Getafe Femenino in Spain.

== International career ==
Having previously represented the Dominican Republic at under–20 level, Santa made her senior debut on 18 February 2021 in a friendly home match against Puerto Rico. She was team captain in that game.
