= Yeranis Lee =

Cuban footballer

Personal information
- Full name: Yeranis Lee González
- Date of birth: 24 March 1999 (age 27)
- Position: Midfielder

International career^{‡}
Years	Team	Apps	(Gls)
2018–	Cuba	7	(0)
- ‡ National team caps and goals as of 11 October 2018

Yeranis Lee González (born 24 March 1999) is a Cuban footballer who plays as a midfielder for the Cuba women's national team.

== International career ==
Lee capped for Cuba at senior level during the 2018 CONCACAF Women's Championship (and its qualification).

Lee scored 6 goals in one game in 2022 W Qualifiers.

== International goals ==
No.	Date	Venue	Opponent	Score	Result	Competition
1.	16 February 2022	Estadio Antonio Maceo, Santiago de Cuba, Cuba	Saint Vincent and the Grenadines	1–0	3–0	2022 CONCACAF W Championship qualification
2.	19 February 2022	Estadio General Francisco Morazán, San Pedro Sula, Honduras	British Virgin Islands	3–0	14–0	2022 CONCACAF W Championship qualification
3.	19 February 2022	Estadio General Francisco Morazán, San Pedro Sula, Honduras	British Virgin Islands	4–0	14–0	2022 CONCACAF W Championship qualification
4.	19 February 2022	Estadio General Francisco Morazán, San Pedro Sula, Honduras	British Virgin Islands	5–0	14–0	2022 CONCACAF W Championship qualification
5.	19 February 2022	Estadio General Francisco Morazán, San Pedro Sula, Honduras	British Virgin Islands	7–0	14–0	2022 CONCACAF W Championship qualification
6.	19 February 2022	Estadio General Francisco Morazán, San Pedro Sula, Honduras	British Virgin Islands	9–0	14–0	2022 CONCACAF W Championship qualification
7.	19 February 2022	Estadio General Francisco Morazán, San Pedro Sula, Honduras	British Virgin Islands	13–0	14–0	2022 CONCACAF W Championship qualification
