= Paide Linnanaiskond =

- Full name: Paide Linnanaiskond
- Ground: Paide Kunstmurustaadion, Paide
- Chairman: (Estonia) Jaanus Pruuli
- Manager: (Estonia) Sirje Kapper
- League: Meistriliiga
- 2026: 1st (Champions)
- Website: www.paidelinnameeskond.ee
Home colours	Away colours	Third colours

Paide Linnanaiskond is an Estonian women's football team based in Paide. It is the women's section of Paide Linnameeskond.

Paide Linnanaiskond was originally established in the late 2000s following the rise of Paide Linnameeskond to the top division, but the team’s activities were later suspended. The women’s team was re-established in 2014 under coach Kalmer Klettenberg, with players from both Paide and Tapa.

After the 2025 season, several teams withdrew from the Naiste Meistriliiga, creating vacancies in the top division. Paide Linnanaiskond, which had finished second in the Naiste Teine liiga, accepted the opportunity to move up and was admitted to the Meistriliiga for the following season, subsequently strengthening its squad with a mix of academy players and experienced additions, including Estonia internationals (such as Lisette Tammik, Kirkeliis Lillemets, Annegret Kala and others .

In May 2026, Paide Linnanaiskond reached the final of the Estonian Women's Cup for the first time in the club's history. The team defeated Tartu JK Tammeka 14–0 in the quarter-finals and FC Elva 5–0 in the semi-finals. In the final, played at Pärnu Rannastaadion on 23 May 2026, Paide took an early lead through Renate-Ly Mehevets, but ultimately lost 4–1 to Saku Sporting, finishing as runners-up.

On 8 November 2026, Paide Linnanaiskond secured its first Naiste Meistriliiga championship by defeating Harju JK Laagri 3–1 in the final round of the season. Lisette Tammik scored twice, while Carola Erik added the third goal. Under head coach Sirje Kapper, Paide finished the season with 18 wins, no draws and seven defeats from 25 matches, scoring 77 goals and conceding 35. The team accumulated 54 points, finishing three points ahead of defending champions Tallinna FC Flora and ending Flora's run of eight consecutive league titles. The championship also marked the first Estonian top-division title won by any senior team representing Paide Linnameeskond.

Following the championship, Paide Linnanaiskond qualified for the 2027–28 UEFA Women's Champions League, marking the club's first qualification for European women's club competition.

Paide Linnanaiskond operates a reserve team Paide Linnanaiskond II competing in Naiste Teine liiga.

== Current squad ==
As of 2 May 2026

The current squad of Paide Linnanaiskond is as follows: Note: Flags indicate national team as defined under FIFA eligibility rules; some limited exceptions apply. Players may hold more than one non-FIFA nationality.

No.	Pos.	Nation	Player
43	GK	EST	Lisette Teder
16	GK	EST	Ursula Isand
3	DF	EST	Adele Sofia Berg
2	DF	EST	Anni Iris Illisson
26	DF	EST	Laura Jaansen
4	DF	EST	Anna Mariin Juksar
18	DF	EST	Annegret Kala
25	DF	EST	Grete Kraus
5	DF	EST	Rahel Repkin
7	DF	EST	Katriin Rodi
15	DF	EST	Maria Soll
13	MF	EST	Carola Erik
10	MF	EST	Aleksandra Kelli
8	MF	EST	Renate-Ly Mehevets
23	MF	EST	Anna Maria Mets
30	MF	EST	Lisandra Rannasto
59	MF	EST	Lisette Tammik
12	MF	EST	Teisi Toomsalu
11	MF	EST	Lisette Uus
17	MF	EST	Kreete Õun
14	FW	EST	Roosi Gansen
77	FW	EST	Nicole Kelli
11	FW	EST	Marie Kiivit
9	FW	EST	Kirkeliis Lillemets

== Coaching staff ==
The club's coaching staff includes:

- (Estonia) Sirje Kapper – Head coach
- (Estonia) Kaivo Sang – Assistant coach
- (Portugal) Joana Martins Freitas – Assistant coach
- (Estonia) Rando Isakar – Goalkeeping coach

== Honours ==
Domestic

- Naiste Meistriliiga
  - Champions (1): 2026
- Estonian Women's Cup
  - Runners-up (1): 2025–26

== Season-by-season record ==
Season	League	Position
2015	Naiste Teine liiga	8th
2016	Naiste Teine liiga	7th
2017	Naiste Teine liiga	4th
2018	Naiste Teine liiga	3rd
2019	Naiste Teine liiga	3rd
2020	Naiste Esiliiga	1st (as a combined team with Tallinna FC Ajax)
2024	Naiste Teine liiga	6th
2025	Naiste Teine liiga	2nd
2026	Naiste Meistriliiga	1st (champions)
