= Lisandra Rannasto =

Estonian footballer (born 2004)

Personal information
- Date of birth: January 13, 2004 (age 22)
- Place of birth: Tallinn, Estonia
- Position: Midfielder

Team information
- Current team: Paide Linnanaiskond
- Number: 30

Youth career
- Saku Sporting

Senior career*
Years	Team	Apps	(Gls)
2021–2023	Saku Sporting	79	(19)
2021–2023	Saku Sporting II	13	(3)
2024	Tartu JK Tammeka	28	(4)
2024	Tartu JK Tammeka II	2	(1)
2025	Saku Sporting	33	(20)
2026–	Paide Linnanaiskond	5	(3)

International career^{‡}
2020	Estonia U17	2	(1)
2021–2023	Estonia U19	19	(4)
2024–	Estonia	9	(0)
- * Club domestic league appearances and goals ‡ National team caps and goals as of 2 May 2026

Lisandra Rannasto (born 13 January 2004) is an Estonian footballer who plays as a midfielder for Paide Linnanaiskond and the Estonia women's national team.

== Club career ==
Rannasto began her senior career with Saku Sporting, progressing from the club's youth system to the first team. Between 2021 and 2023, she made 79 appearances and scored 19 goals for the first team, while also featuring for the club's reserve side.

In 2024, she joined Tartu JK Tammeka on loan from Saku Sporting in search of greater responsibility at top-flight level. Primarily deployed as an attacking wide midfielder, she was regarded as one of the players aiming for a breakthrough season and was at the time considered a potential debutant for the Estonia women's national team. During the season, she made 28 league appearances and scored four goals.

Rannasto returned to Saku Sporting for the 2025 season, making 33 league appearances and scoring 20 goals.

Ahead of the 2026 season, she signed for Paide Linnanaiskond following the club's promotion to the Naiste Meistriliiga. The move was announced as the club's first reinforcement of the season, with Rannasto joining as an Estonia international and one of the key additions to strengthen the squad for top-flight competition.

== International career ==
Rannasto has represented Estonia at youth international level, making appearances for the under-17 and under-19 teams.

She made her senior debut for the Estonia women's national team on 2 December 2024 in a match against Kosovo.

In February 2025, she was called up again to the national team squad.

As of April 2026, she has earned nine caps for the national team.

== Career statistics ==
=== Club ===
Club	Season	League			National cup		Total	
Club	Season	Division	Apps	Goals	Apps	Goals	Apps	Goals
Saku Sporting	2021	Naiste Meistriliiga	24	5	1	0	25	5
Saku Sporting II	2021	Naiste Esiliiga	6	1	1	0	7	1
Saku Sporting	2022	Naiste Meistriliiga	17	8	1	0	18	8
Saku Sporting II	2022				1	1	1	1
Saku Sporting	2023	Naiste Meistriliiga	22	6	3	0	25	6
Saku Sporting II	2023	Naiste Esiliiga	3	1	1	0	4	1
Tartu JK Tammeka	2024	Naiste Meistriliiga	25	4	1	0	26	4
Tartu JK Tammeka II	2024	Naiste Teine liiga	2	1			2	1
Saku Sporting	2025	Naiste Meistriliiga	26	18	3	2	29	20
Paide Linnanaiskond	2026	Naiste Meistriliiga	4	1	1	2	5	3
Total			129	45	13	5	142	50

=== Youth international career ===
Team	Years	Apps	Goals
Estonia U17	2020	2	1
Estonia U19	2021–2023	19	4

=== Appearances and goals by national team and year ===
Year	Apps	Goals
2024	1	0
2025	5	0
2026	3	0
Total	9	0
