= Gloria Aguilar =

Guatemalan footballer (born 1990)

Personal information
- Full name: Gloria Estefani Aguilar de Mata
- Date of birth: 12 March 1990 (age 36)
- Place of birth: Guatemala
- Position: Defender

Senior career*
Years	Team	Apps	(Gls)
2017	Alianza Petrolera		

International career^{‡}
2014–	Guatemala	5	(1)
- * Club domestic league appearances and goals ‡ National team caps and goals as of 8 October 2019

Gloria Estefani Aguilar de Mata (born 12 March 1990) is a Guatemalan footballer who plays as a defender and the Guatemala women's national team.

== See also ==
- List of Guatemala women's international footballers
