= Daphne Heyaime =

Dominican footballer

Personal information
- Full name: Daphne Liliana Heyaime Fernández
- Date of birth: 13 April 1998 (age 28)
- Place of birth: Santo Domingo, Dominican Republic
- Height: 1.68 m (5 ft 6 in)
- Position: Forward

Youth career
- The Ashton School

College career
Years	Team	Apps	(Gls)
2016–2019	Newberry Wolves	68	(26)

International career^{‡}
- Dominican Republic U20
2019–	Dominican Republic	2	(0)
- ‡ National team caps and goals as of 8 October 2019

Daphne Liliana Heyaime Fernández (born 13 April 1998) is a Dominican footballer who plays as a forward for the Dominican Republic women's national team.

== International career ==
Heyaime has appeared for the Dominican Republic at the 2020 CONCACAF Women's Olympic Qualifying Championship qualification.
