= Cecily Stoute =

American–Trinidad and Tobago footballer

Personal information
- Full name: Shadi Cecily Stoute
- Date of birth: 26 October 1999 (age 27)
- Place of birth: United States
- Height: 1.70 m (5 ft 7 in)
- Position: Defender

Team information
- Current team: Georgia Bulldogs
- Number: 24

College career
Years	Team	Apps	(Gls)
2018–	Georgia Lady Bulldogs	17	(0)

International career^{‡}
2018	Trinidad and Tobago U20	3	(0)
2018–	Trinidad and Tobago	7	(1)
- ‡ National team caps and goals as of 10 October 2018

Shadi Cecily Stoute (born 26 October 1999) is an American-born Trinidad and Tobago footballer who plays as a defender for Georgia Lady Bulldogs and the Trinidad and Tobago women's national team.

== College career ==
Stoute attends the University of Georgia since 2018. In 2022, Stoute was named an Arthur Ashe, Jr. Sports Scholar by Diverse: Issues In Higher Education.

== International career ==
Stoute represented Trinidad and Tobago at the 2018 CONCACAF Women's U-20 Championship. She made her senior debut in 2018.
