= Danielle Marcano =

Puerto Rican footballer (born 1997)

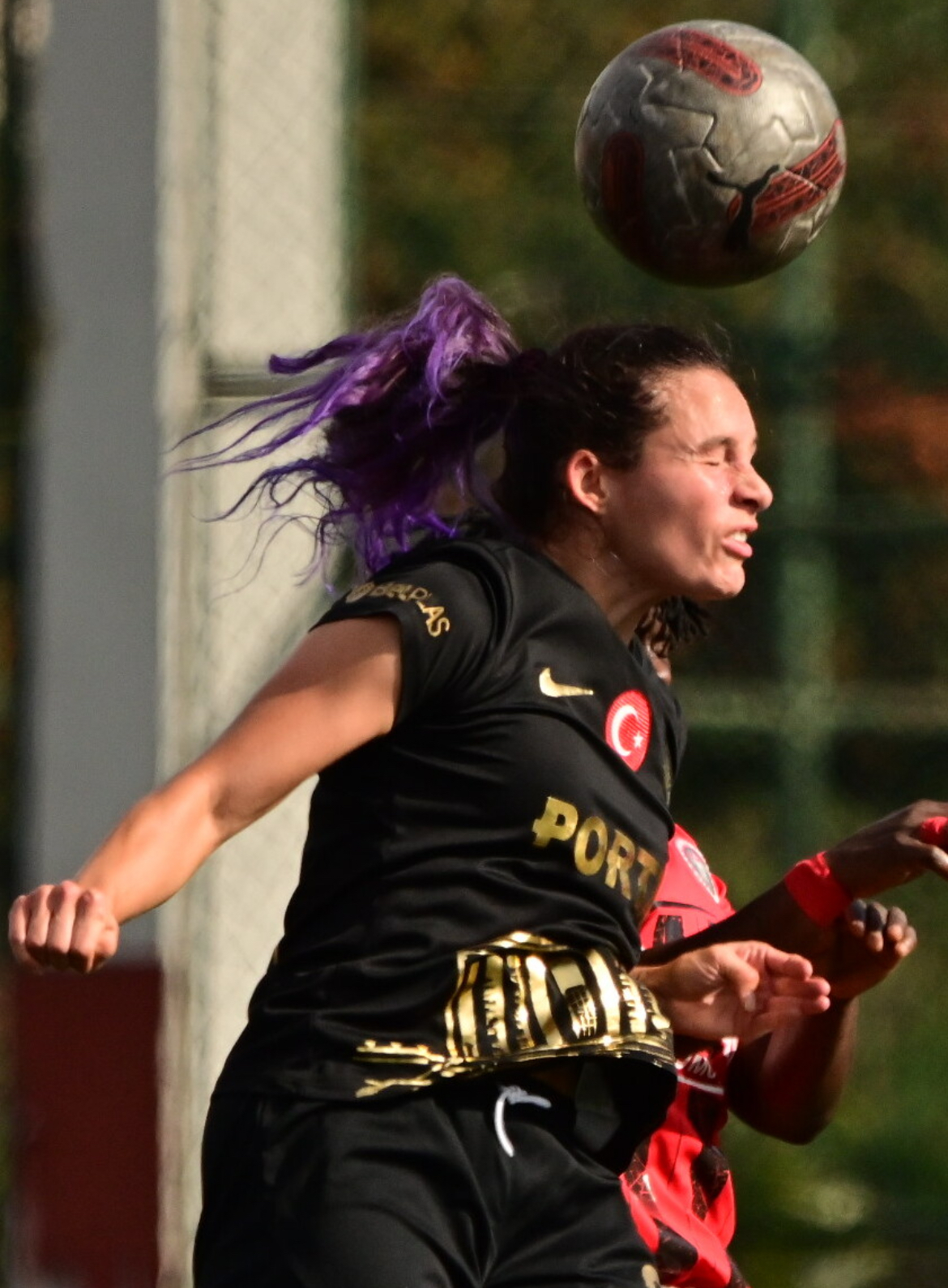
- Marcano with FOMGET in 2023

Personal information
- Full name: Danielle Julia Marcano
- Date of birth: August 20, 1997 (age 29)
- Place of birth: Red Bank, New Jersey, U.S.
- Height: 1.60 m (5 ft 3 in)
- Position: Forward

Team information
- Current team: Valencia
- Number: 7

Youth career
- 2011–2015: Greater Atlanta Christian School

College career
Years	Team	Apps	(Gls)
2015–2018	Tennessee Volunteers	76	(16)

Senior career*
Years	Team	Apps	(Gls)
2021	HK Kópavogur	12	(10)
2022	Thróttur Reykjavík	15	(9)
2022–2023	Fenerbahçe	19	(7)
2023–2024	FOMGET	28	(10)
2024–2025	Nantes	21	(2)
2025–	Valencia	26	(9)

International career^{‡}
2024–	Puerto Rico	12	(11)
- * Club domestic league appearances and goals as of September 29, 2026 ‡ National team caps and goals as of February 27, 2026

Danielle Julia Marcano (born August 20, 1997) is a professional footballer who plays as a forward for Liga F club Valencia. Born in the United States, she plays for the Puerto Rico women's national team.

== Early life ==
Danielle Julia Marcano was born to Michael Marcano and his wife Lora in Red Bank, New Jersey, United States, on August 20, 1997. She has an older brother Ryan who also played college soccer.

Marcano attended the private Greater Atlanta Christian School in Norcross, Georgia, where she scored 70 goals for her high school team. She was named GHSA Girls' Soccer Player of the Year in 2014 and 2015. Between 2015 and 2018, Marcano studied psychology at the University of Tennessee.

== College career ==
Marcano played college soccer with the Tennessee Volunteers from 2015 to 2018 with 76 total appearances, scoring 16 goals including six game-winners, and making seven assists.

Initially a wing-back, Marcano was moved to forward in 2017. During the first round of the 2017 NCAA Division I tournament, she scored the winning goal against Murray State in the 60th minute after coming off the bench to replace the Lady Vols' leading scorer, Khadija Shaw, who was injured in the first three minutes.

During the 2018 NCAA Division I women's soccer tournament, Marcano scored twice against University of Arizona, including the winning goal with 55 seconds left in the game, sending the University of Tennessee to the Sweet 16 for the first time since 2007. In the third round, Marcano scored twice again, this time against No. 16-ranked Texas A&M, helping to send UT to the NCAA quarterfinals for the first time ever. She was named the Player of the Week by TopDrawerSoccer.com in November 2018.

== Professional career ==
=== Icelandic clubs ===
In April 2021, she signed a professional contract with the Icelandic club HK Kópavogur to play in the 1. deild kvenna. She scored six goals in 12 games. In 2022, she transferred to the Besta deild kvenna club Thróttur Reykjavík, where she capped in 15 league games and in one cup match scoring ten goals in total.

=== Fenerbahçe ===
In October 2022, Marcano moved to Turkey, and signed with the Istanbul-based club Fenerbahçe S.K. to play in the Women's Super League. Her team finished the season as runners-up after losing the play-offs final to Ankara BB Fomget GSK.

=== Ankara BB Fomget ===
In August 2023, she transferred to league rivals Ankara BB Fomget GSK. She played in two matches of the 2023–24 UEFA Women's Champions League qualifying rounds, and scored two goals in the match against Hajvalia from Kosovo.

=== FC Nantes and Valencia ===
Marcano joined French side Nantes ahead of the 2024–25 season. On January 18, 2025, Danielle scored her first goal for the club, against Reims. The following week, she scored in the French Cup, she dit it again against Paris Saint-Germain.

On August 14, 2025, after just one year, she left Nantes to join Valencia in Spain.

== International career ==
During her high school years, Marcano was part of the U.S. national player pool, and called up to camp in 2011 and 2012. In 2013, she was part of the U.S. women's national U-17 soccer team.

== Career statistics ==
As of match played 14 October 2023

Appearances and goals by club, season and competition
Club	Season	League			National cup		Continental		Total	
Club	Season	Division	Apps	Goals	Apps	Goals	Apps	Goals	Apps	Goals
HK Kópavogs	2021	Icelandic League	12	10			—		12	10
Thróttur Reykjavík	2022	Icelandic First League	15	9			—		15	9
Fenerbahçe	2022–23	Turkish Super League	19	7			—		19	7
Ankara BB Fomget GSK	2023–24	Turkish Super League	16	7			2	2	18	9
Career total			62	33			2	2	64	35

=== International ===
Scores and results list Puerto Rico's goal tally first, score column indicates score after each Marcano goal.

List of international goals scored by Danielle Marcano
No.	Date	Venue	Opponent	Score	Result	Competition
1	24 February 2024	Snapdragon Stadium, San Diego, United States	Panama	2–1	2–1	2024 CONCACAF W Gold Cup
2	3 April 2024	Mayagüez Athletics Stadium, Mayagüez, Puerto Rico	Cayman Islands	5–0	12–0	Friendly
3	3 April 2024	Mayagüez Athletics Stadium, Mayagüez, Puerto Rico	Cayman Islands	11–0	12–0	Friendly
4	3 April 2024	Mayagüez Athletics Stadium, Mayagüez, Puerto Rico	Cayman Islands	12–0	12–0	Friendly
5	23 February 2025	Gold City Sport Complex, Alanya, Turkey	Iran	1–1	1–1	2025 Turkish Women's Cup
6	26 February 2025	Gold City Sport Complex, Alanya, Turkey	Iran	2–0	2–0	2025 Turkish Women's Cup
7	31 May 2025	Estadio Cementos Progreso, Guatemala City, Guatemala	Guatemala	1–0	2–1	Friendly
8	31 May 2025	Estadio Cementos Progreso, Guatemala City, Guatemala	Guatemala	2–?	2–1	Friendly
9	1 December 2025	Estadio Juan Ramón Loubriel, Bayamón, Puerto Rico	Saint Lucia	2–0	7–0	2026 CONCACAF W Championship qualification
10	27 February 2026	Estadio Juan Ramón Loubriel, Bayamón, Puerto Rico	Saint Vincent and the Grenadines	1–0	10–0	2026 CONCACAF W Championship qualification
11	27 February 2026	Estadio Juan Ramón Loubriel, Bayamón, Puerto Rico	Saint Vincent and the Grenadines	6–0	10–0	2026 CONCACAF W Championship qualification
12	5 March 2026	Bethlehem Soccer Stadium, St. Croix, U.S. Virgin Islands	U.S. Virgin Islands	2–0	9–0	2026 CONCACAF W Championship qualification
13	5 March 2026	Bethlehem Soccer Stadium, St. Croix, U.S. Virgin Islands	U.S. Virgin Islands	4–0	9–0	2026 CONCACAF W Championship qualification

== Honors ==
Greater Atlanta Christian School

- Georgia High School Association (GHSA) State League: 2012, 2014

Fenerbahçe

- Turkish Women's Football Super League runner-up: 2022–23

Individual

- GHSA Girls' Soccer Player of the Year for all classifications (2014)
- GHSA Class AA Girls' Soccer Player of the Year (2015)
