= Kirkeliis Lillemets =

Estonian footballer (born 2005)

Personal information
- Date of birth: 7 December 2005 (age 20)
- Place of birth: Estonia
- Position: Forward

Team information
- Current team: Paide Linnanaiskond

Senior career*
Years	Team	Apps	(Gls)
2021–2024	Tartu JK Tammeka	84	(46)
2022–2024	Tartu JK Tammeka II	4	(4)
2025–2026	Bayer Leverkusen II	11	(5)
2026–	Paide Linnameeskond	5	(6)

International career
2024–	Estonia	7	(0)
- * Club domestic league appearances and goals as of 5 May 2026

Kirkeliis Lillemets (born 7 December 2005) is an Estonian professional footballer who plays as a forward for Paide Linnanaiskond.

== Club career ==
Lillemets began her senior career with Tartu JK Tammeka, making her debut in the Naiste Meistriliiga in 2022. During her first seasons with the club, she established herself as a regular first-team player, while also making occasional appearances for the club's reserve side.

In 2023, she enjoyed her most productive season, scoring 15 league goals in 25 appearances. She continued her strong form in 2024, adding 13 goals in 21 league matches.

At the beginning of 2025, Lillemets moved abroad to join Bayer Leverkusen. She initially trained with the first team and was included in the matchday squad in the Frauen-Bundesliga. However, her progress was later interrupted by a knee injury, with Lillemets later recalling that a Bundesliga debut had been only weeks away before the setback. She later featured for the club's reserve side, scoring five goals in 11 appearances.

Ahead of the 2026 season, Lillemets returned to Estonia and signed for Paide Linnanaiskond. She made an immediate impact at the club, scoring four goals in her first four league appearances.

== International career ==
Lillemets represented Estonia at youth international level, making appearances for the under-15, under-17 and under-19 teams.

She made her senior debut for the Estonia women's national team on 21 February 2024 in a match against India. During 2024, she made four appearances for the national team.

In 2025, Lillemets added three further appearances for Estonia, including her first appearance in the UEFA Women's Nations League.

As of May 2026, she has earned seven caps for the national team.

== Career statistics ==
=== Club ===
Club	Season	League			National cup		Total	
Club	Season	Division	Apps	Goals	Apps	Goals	Apps	Goals
Tartu JK Tammeka	2022	Naiste Meistriliiga	16	4			16	4
Tartu JK Tammeka	2022	Naiste Meistriliiga	13	7	2	6	15	13
Tartu JK Tammeka II	2022	Naiste Esiliiga	1	2			1	2
Tartu JK Tammeka	2023	Naiste Meistriliiga	25	15	3	1	28	16
Tartu JK Tammeka II	2023	Naiste Esiliiga	1	1			1	1
Tartu JK Tammeka	2024	Naiste Meistriliiga	21	13	1	0	22	13
Tartu JK Tammeka II	2024	Naiste Teine liiga	2	1			2	1
Bayer Leverkusen II	2024-2025	Naiste Meistriliiga	11	5			11	5
Paide Linnanaiskond	2026	Naiste Meistriliiga	4	4	1	2	5	6
Total			94	52	7	9	101	61

=== Youth international career ===
Team	Years	Apps	Goals
Estonia U15	2019	3	0
Estonia U17	2020–2021	5	4
Estonia U19	2022–2023	13	4

=== Appearances and goals by national team and year ===
Year	Apps	Goals
2024	4	0
2025	3	0
Total	7	0
