= 2025 Turkish Women's Cup =

Tournament details
- Host country: Turkey
- Dates: 20–26 February
- Teams: 3 (from 3 confederations)
- Venue: 1 (in 1 host city)

Final positions
- Champions: Puerto Rico (1st title)
- Runners-up: Iran
- Third place: Estonia

Tournament statistics
- Matches played: 3
- Goals scored: 5 (1.67 per match)
- Top scorer(s): (Puerto Rico) Gloria Douglas (Puerto Rico) Danielle Marcano (2 goals)

The 2025 Turkish Women's Cup was the ninth edition of the Turkish Women's Cup, the annual women's football tournament held in Alanya, Turkey for the women's national association football teams. The tournament took place from 20 to 26 February 2025.

== Teams ==
Three football associations from three confederations (namely UEFA, AFC, and CONCACAF) confirmed their participation in the tournament.

Team	App	FIFA ranking December 2024
Iran	1st	67
Puerto Rico	1st	85
Estonia	3rd	99

== Matches ==
20 February 2025
14:30

Puerto Rico	1–0	Estonia
Douglas 61'	Report

Gold City Sport Complex, Alanya
Attendance: 30
Referee: Asen Albayrak (Turkey)

23 February 2025
15:30

Puerto Rico	1–1	Iran
Marcano 86'	Report	Alizadeh 52'

Gold City Sport Complex, Alanya
Referee: Cansu Tiryaki (Turkey)

26 February 2025
15:30

Iran	0–2	Puerto Rico
	Report	Douglas 71'; Marcano 88'

Gold City Sport Complex, Alanya
Referee: Hatice Aydin (Turkey)

== Ranking ==
Rank	Team	M	W	D	L	GF	GA	GD	Points
1	Puerto Rico	2	1	1	0	3	1	+2	4
2	Iran	2	0	1	1	1	3	-2	1
3	Estonia	1	0	0	1	0	1	-1	0

== Goalscorers ==
There were 5 goals scored in 3 matches, for an average of 1.67 goals per match.

2 goals

- (Puerto Rico) Gloria Douglas
- (Puerto Rico) Danielle Marcano

1 goal

- (Iran) Zahra Alizadeh

== See also ==
- 2025 Pinatar Cup
- 2025 SheBelieves Cup
- 2025 Pink Ladies Cup
