= Gloria Douglas =

Puerto Rican footballer (born 1992)

Personal information
- Full name: Gloria Edna Douglas
- Date of birth: May 4, 1992 (age 34)
- Place of birth: Tacoma, Washington, U.S.
- Height: 1.75 m (5 ft 9 in)
- Positions: Midfielder; striker

Team information
- Current team: Pradejón

College career
Years	Team	Apps	(Gls)
2010–2013	Virginia Cavaliers	96	(22)

Senior career*
Years	Team	Apps	(Gls)
2014	Røa IL	13	(2)
2015	Iga FC Kunoichi Mie		
2016	Shelbourne FC	1	(1)
2017	Washington Spirit Reserves		
2017	Shelbourne FC	2	(2)
2018	Sandvikens IF	13	(2)
2019	KR	11	(4)
2020	BV Cloppenburg	2	(1)
2020–2021	1. FC Saarbrücken	15	(3)
2021	IFK Norrköping	13	(2)
2022	Shelbourne FC	11	(3)
2022–2023	Zaragoza CFF	22	(7)
2024	Femarguín	7	(0)
2024–	Pradejón	0	(0)

International career
- United States U18
	Puerto Rico	6	(0)
- * Club domestic league appearances and goals as of May 5, 2024

Gloria Edna Douglas (born May 4, 1992) is a footballer who plays as a midfielder or striker for Segunda Federación club Pradejón. Born in the mainland United States, she is a Puerto Rico international.

== Early life ==
Douglas attended Fayetteville Academy in the United States. She was regarded as one of the soccer team's most important players.

== Club career ==
In 2016, Douglas signed for Irish side Shelbourne FC. She helped the club win the 2016 FAI Women's Cup.

== International career ==
Douglas is a Puerto Rico international. She played for the Puerto Rico women's national football team at the 2024 CONCACAF W Gold Cup. She previously played for the United States women's national under-18 soccer team.

== Style of play ==
Douglas mainly operates as a midfielder or striker. She is known for her strength.

== Personal life ==
Douglas was born in 1992 in the United States. She has danced as a hobby.

== International goals ==
No.	Date	Venue	Opponent	Score	Result	Competition
1.	20 February 2025	Gold City Sport Complex, Alanya, Turkey	Estonia	1–0	1–0	2025 Turkish Women's Cup
2.	25 February 2025	Gold City Sport Complex, Alanya, Turkey	Iran	1–0	2–0	2025 Turkish Women's Cup
