= Rahel Repkin =

Estonian footballer

Personal information
- Date of birth: 17 June 1998 (age 28)
- Place of birth: Tartu, Estonia
- Position: Midfielder

Team information
- Current team: Paide Linnanaiskond
- Number: 18

Senior career*
Years	Team	Apps	(Gls)
2015–2023	Tammeka	165	(6)
2018	FC Elva (women)	11	(3)
2024	FC Wacker Innsbruck (women)/Tammeka	11 / 14	(0 / 0)
2025	IFK Värnamo (women) / Paide Linnanaiskond	0 / 8	(0 / 7)
2026–	Paide Linnanaiskond		

International career^{‡}
2014	Estonia U17	5	(0)
2015–2016	Estonia U19	20	(1)
2020–	Estonia	22	(0)
- * Club domestic league appearances and goals ‡ National team caps and goals as of 19 April 2026

Rahel Repkin (born 17 June 1998) is an Estonian association footballer who plays as a midfielder for Paide Linnanaiskond and the Estonia women's national team.

== Club career ==
Repkin began her senior career with Tartu JK Tammeka, where she established herself as a regular first-team player. Between 2015 and 2023, she made over 160 appearances for the club.

In 2018, she also made appearances for FC Elva.

In 2024, she signed for Austrian club FC Wacker Innsbruck, marking her first move abroad. She spent the first half of the year with the club, featuring regularly in the Austrian top division, but was unable to help Wacker avoid relegation. She later returned to Tammeka for the remainder of the season.

In February 2025, she signed for Swedish club IFK Värnamo, competing in the third tier of the Swedish league system, marking her second move abroad. She joined the club on a one-year contract and was expected to play a regular role in the team. Repkin described the move as an opportunity to continue her career abroad after an unsatisfactory spell in Austria, noting that the level and conditions in the Swedish third division were higher than those she had experienced at her previous club. The club had finished third in its league the previous season and aimed for promotion.

However, her time at IFK Värnamo was affected by limited playing opportunities, as her commitments to the Estonia national team created scheduling conflicts, which in turn also affected her involvement at international level.Later in 2025, she returned to Estonia and joined Paide Linnanaiskond.

== International career ==
Repkin has represented Estonia at youth international level, playing for the under-17 and under-19 teams.

She made her senior debut for the Estonia women's national team on 23 October 2020 against the Netherlands, coming on as a substitute for Kristiina Tullus.

As of May 2026, she has earned 22 caps for the national team.

== Career statistics ==
=== Club ===
Club	Season	League			National cup		Total	
Club	Season	Division	Apps	Goals	Apps	Goals	Apps	Goals
Tartu JK Tammeka	2015	Naiste Meistriliiga	19	2	1	0	20	2
Tartu JK Tammeka II	2015	Naiste Teine liiga	2	4			2	4
Tartu JK Tammeka	2016	Naiste Meistriliiga	16	1	1	0	17	1
Tartu JK Tammeka II	2016	Naiste Esiliiga	1	0			1	0
Tartu JK Tammeka	2017	Naiste Meistriliiga	19	0	3	1	22	1
FC Elva	2018	Naiste Esiliiga	11	3			11	3
Tartu JK Tammeka	2019	Naiste Meistriliiga	18	0	1	0	19	0
Tartu JK Tammeka	2020	Naiste Meistriliiga	20	0	1	0	21	0
Tartu JK Tammeka	2021	Naiste Meistriliiga	22	1			22	1
Tartu JK Tammeka	2022	Naiste Meistriliiga	24	0	4	1	28	1
Tartu JK Tammeka	2023	Naiste Meistriliiga	26	1	3	0	29	1
Tartu JK Tammeka	2023	Naiste Meistriliiga	26	1	3	0	29	1
FC Wacker Innsbruck	2024	11	0					
Tartu JK Tammeka	2024	Naiste Meistriliiga	14	0			14	0
IFK Värnamo	2025	0	0					
Paide Linnanaiskond	2025	Naiste Teine liiga	8	7	1	0	9	7
Paide Linnanaiskond	2026	Naiste Meistriliiga	4	0	1	0	5	0
Total			230	20	19	2	249	22

=== Youth international career ===
Team	Years	Apps	Goals
Estonia U17	2020	2	1
Estonia U19	2021–2023	19	4

=== Appearances and goals by national team and year ===
Year	Apps	Goals
2020	1	0
2023	9	0
2024	8	0
2025	3	0
2026	1	0
Total	22	0
