= JoJo Cotto =

Puerto Rican footballer

Personal information
- Full name: Josephine Lara Cotto
- Date of birth: 15 January 2000 (age 26)
- Place of birth: Menlo Park, California, U.S.
- Height: 1.70 m (5 ft 7 in)
- Position: Midfielder

Team information
- Current team: 1. FFC Hof
- Number: 24

College career
| Years | Team | Apps | (Gls) |
| 2018–2021 | Penn Quakers | 7 | (0) |

Senior career*
| Years | Team | Apps | (Gls) |
| 2023 | FA Euro | 12 | |
| 2024 | Downtown United | 9 | |
| 2024 - 2026 | Nhrhides Fthias | 24 | (16) |
| 2026 - | 1. FFC HOF | 11 | (5) |

International career^{‡}
| 2015 | Puerto Rico U-17 | 2 | (1) |
| 2015 | Puerto Rico U-20 | 3 | (0) |
| 2021– | Puerto Rico | 27 | (1) |
- * Club domestic league appearances and goals ‡ National team caps and goals as of March 2022

Josephine Lara Cotto (born 15 January 2000) is a Puerto Rican footballer who plays as a midfielder for the Puerto Rico women's national team.

== Early life and college ==
Cotto attended Menlo-Atherton High School with whom she won the Central Coast Section Division I championship in 2016. She scored the winning goal in the final match.

In the 2017 Northern California State Cup Finals, Cotto tore her anterior crucial ligament for the first time. Two games into her freshman year at University of Pennsylvania, she tore her ACL for the second time during a team practice which sidelined her for over a year.

== International career ==
In the fall of 2015, Cotto represented both the Puerto Rico U-17 team and Puerto Rico U-20 team in their respective Caribbean Zone qualifiers for the 2016 CONCACAF Women's U-17 Championship and 2015 CONCACAF Women's U-20 Championship.

Cotto made her senior debut for the Puerto Rican women's national football team in June 2021 during a 5–1 friendly loss to Uruguay. On 21 October 2021, Cotto scored her first goal for Puerto Rico, opening the scoring in a 6–1 friendly victory over Guyana.

In June 2023, Cotto represented Puerto Rico in the 24th Central American and Caribbean Games in El Salvador. She started all three games and played every minute, tallying in assist against El Salvador.

== Professional career ==
Cotto began her professional career in Greece, joining Nhrhides Fthias for the 2024-2025 season. She was the first international transfer in the team's history, alongside former Puerto Rican national team teammate Adriana Font. Cotto finished as the league's 2024 - 2025 Golden Boot Award Winner, scoring 13 goals and tallying 7 assists in 13 games. In her second season with the team, she also recorded the league's highest number of assists with 13 assists in 11 games.

In the summer of 2026, Cotto signed with the German club 1. FFC Hof e.V., joining two other international transfers.
