= Annegret Kala =

Estonian footballer (born 2006)

Personal information
- Date of birth: 3 May 2006 (age 20)
- Place of birth: Tartu, Estonia
- Position: Defender

Team information
- Current team: Paide Linnanaiskond
- Number: 18

Youth career
- Tartu JK Tammeka

Senior career*
Years	Team	Apps	(Gls)
2022	Tartu JK Tammeka II	1	(0)
2022–2025	Tartu JK Tammeka	106	(8)
2025–	Paide Linnanaiskond	5	(1)

International career^{‡}
2019–2020	Estonia U15	5	(0)
2021–2023	Estonia U17	20	(0)
2023–2024	Estonia U19	5	(0)
2023–	Estonia	24	(1)
- * Club domestic league appearances and goals ‡ National team caps and goals as of 2 May 2026

Annegret Kala (born 3 May 2006) is an Estonian footballer who plays as a defender for Paide Linnanaiskond and the Estonia women's national team.

== Club career ==
Kala began her senior career with Tartu JK Tammeka, where she became the team's captain. During the 2025 season, she made 25 appearances and scored five goals for the club. Ahead of the 2026 season, Kala transferred to Paide Linnanaiskond, becoming one of several notable additions as the club strengthened its squad following promotion to the Meistriliiga.

== International career ==
Kala made her debut for the Estonia women's national team on 14 July 2023.

Kala scored her first international goal in a friendly match against Hong Kong in February 2024.

As of May 2026, she has made 24 appearances and scored one goal for the national team.

== Career statistics ==
=== Club ===
Club	Season	League			National cup		Total	
Club	Season	Division	Apps	Goals	Apps	Goals	Apps	Goals
Tartu JK Tammeka	2022	Naiste Meistriliiga	22	0	3	0	25	0
Tartu JK Tammeka II	2022	Naiste Esiliiga	1	0				
Tartu JK Tammeka	2023	Naiste Meistriliiga	25	0	2	0	27	0
Tartu JK Tammeka	2024	Naiste Meistriliiga	25	3	1	0	26	3
Tartu JK Tammeka	2025	Naiste Meistriliiga	25	5	1	0	26	5
Paide Linnanaiskond	2026	Naiste Meistriliiga	4	1	1	0	5	1
Total			97	9	10	0	107	9

=== Youth international career ===
Team	Years	Apps	Goals
Estonia U15	2019–2020	5	0
Estonia U17	2021–2023	20	0
Estonia U19	2023–2024	5	0

=== Appearances and goals by national team and year ===
Year	Apps	Goals
2023	5	0
2024	8	1
2025	8	0
2026	3	0
Total	24	1

=== International goals ===
No.	Date	Venue	Opponent	Score	Result	Competition
1	27 February 2024	Alanya Gold City, Turkey	Hong Kong	1–0	1–0	Friendly
