= Puerto Rico women's national football team =

Puerto Rico
- Nickname(s): El Huracán Azul (The Blue Hurricane); Las Boricuas (The Boricuas)
- Association: Puerto Rican Football Federation
- Confederation: CONCACAF (North America, Central America and the Caribbean)
- Sub-confederation: CFU (Caribbean)
- Head coach: Nat González
- Captain: Nickolette Driesse
- Most caps: Karina Socarrás (25)
- Top scorer: Karina Socarrás (25)
- Home stadium: Various
- FIFA code: PUR
First colors	Second colors

FIFA ranking
- Current: 77 (20 October 2026)
- Highest: 77 (August 2025)
- Lowest: 124 (October 2007)

First international
- Canada 21–0 Puerto Rico (Etobicoke, Ontario, Canada; August 28, 1998)

Biggest win
- Puerto Rico 12–0 Grenada (Bayamón, Puerto Rico; August 21, 2015); Puerto Rico 12–0 Cayman Islands (Mayagüez, Puerto Rico; 3 April 2024)

Biggest defeat
- Canada 21–0 Puerto Rico (Etobicoke, Ontario, Canada; August 28, 1998)

CONCACAF W Championship/ Gold Cup
- Appearances: 2 (first in 1998)
- Best result: Group stage (1998, 2024)

The Puerto Rico women's national football team (Spanish: Selección femenina de fútbol de Puerto Rico) represents Puerto Rico in women's international football, and are governed by the Federación Puertorriqueña de Fútbol (FPF).

== History ==
On 30 August 2018, in a home friendly versus Argentina, players staged a protest against the Puerto Rican Football Federation over an alleged lack of support and financial transparency.

== Team image ==
=== Nicknames ===
The Puerto Rico women's national football team has been known or nicknamed as "Las Boricuas (The Boricuas)".

=== Home stadium ===
Puerto Rico plays its home matches among various stadiums.

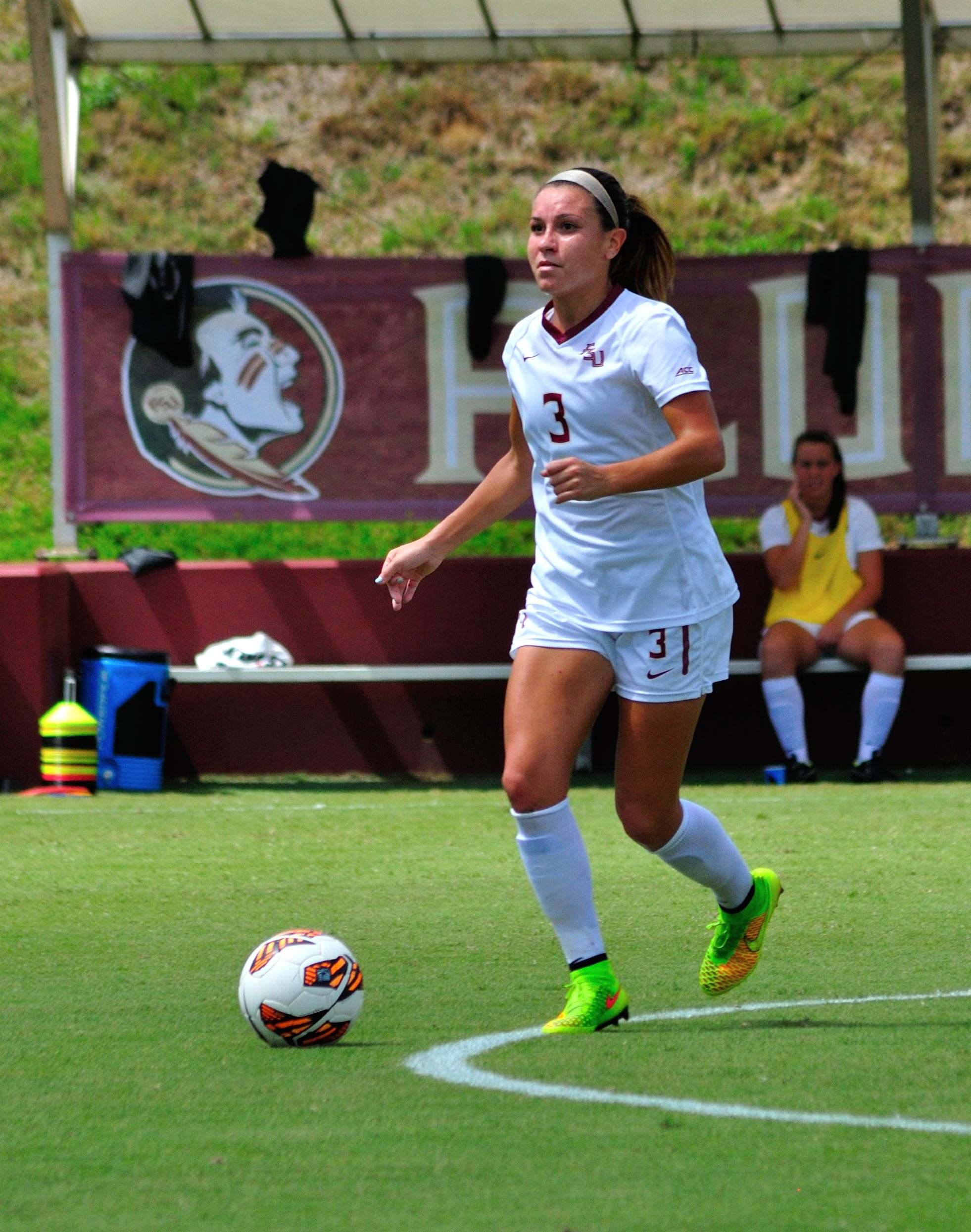
Nickolette Driesse played numerous games for Puerto Rico

== Results and fixtures ==
The following is a list of match results in the last 12 months, as well as any future matches that have been scheduled.

Legend

Win Draw Loss Fixture

=== 2025 ===
1 December 2025 2026 CONCACAF W Championship Q	Puerto Rico	7–0	Saint Lucia	Bayamón
19:30 UTC−4	Aguilera 4', 39', 74', 78'; Marcano 12'; De Jesus 18'; C. Torres 64'	Report (FIFA); Report (CONCACAF)		Stadium: Estadio Juan Ramón Loubriel; Referee: Odette Hamilton (Jamaica)

- Puerto Rico Results and Fixtures – Soccerway.com

=== 2026 ===
27 February 2026 2026 CONCACAF W Championship Q	Puerto Rico	7–0	Saint Vincent and the Grenadines	Bayamón
20:00 UTC−4	Marcano 11', 42'; Aguilera 21', 74' (pen.), 77'; Love 23', 34'; Em. González 27'; Gillespie 45'; Nieves-Melchor 50'	Report (FIFA); Report (CONCACAF)		Stadium: Estadio Juan Ramón Loubriel; Referee: Saphire Stockman (Costa Rica)

5 March 2026 2026 CONCACAF W Championship Q	U.S. Virgin Islands	0–9	Puerto Rico	St. Croix
15:30 UTC−4		Report (FIFA); Report (CONCACAF)	Aguilera 35', 82'; Marcano 38' (pen.), 45+5'; Tapia 41'; Es. González 45', 90+1'; C. Torres 55'; García 90+3'	Stadium: Bethlehem Soccer Stadium; Referee: Minely Ureña (Dominican Republic)

18 April 2026 2026 CONCACAF W Championship Q	Mexico	6–0	Puerto Rico	Toluca
18ː00 UTC−6	Delgado 11'; Es. González 32' (o.g.); Camberos 39'; Palacios 59'; Corral 63', 86'	Report (FIFA); Report (CONCACAF)		Stadium: Estadio Nemesio Díez; Referee: Natalie Simon (United States)

29 July 2026 2026 Central American and Caribbean Games	Mexico	0-0	Puerto Rico	Santiago de los Caballeros, Dominican Republic
18ː00 UTC−6		Report		Stadium: Estadio Cibao FC

31 July 2026 2026 Central American and Caribbean Games	Puerto Rico	1-0	Jamaica	Santiago de los Caballeros, Dominican Republic
18ː00 UTC−6	García 26'	Report		Stadium: Estadio Cibao FC

2 August 2026 2026 Central American and Caribbean Games	Puerto Rico	0–3	Colombia	Santiago de los Caballeros, Dominican Republic
14:00		Report	Guerra 25'; Viáfara 32'; Carvajal 75'	Stadium: Estadio Cibao FC; Referee: Kattia Flores (El Salvador)

== Head-to-head record ==
As of 8 June 2026

Team	Pld	W	D	L	GF	GA
Anguilla	2	2	0	0	19	0
Argentina	2	0	1	1	1	4
Aruba	2	2	0	0	14	0
Antigua and Barbuda	2	2	0	0	12	0
Barbados	1	1	0	0	1	0
Bermuda	1	1	0	0	5	1
Bolivia	2	0	0	2	2	4
Canada	1	0	0	1	0	21
Cayman Islands	3	3	0	0	24	0
Costa Rica	1	0	0	1	0	9
Colombia	1	0	0	1	0	2
Cuba	2	0	1	1	5	6
Dominica	1	1	0	0	6	0
Dominican Republic	6	1	4	1	4	6
El Salvador	1	0	1	0	2	2
Estonia	1	1	0	0	1	0
Grenada	1	1	0	0	12	0
Guatemala	6	3	1	2	6	11
Guyana	3	3	0	0	9	2
Haiti	7	3	0	4	5	15
Iran	2	1	1	0	3	1
Jamaica	4	0	1	3	2	22
Martinique	2	0	1	1	1	9
Mexico	6	0	0	6	1	27
Nicaragua	1	1	0	0	3	1
Saint Kitts and Nevis	1	1	0	0	7	0
Saint Lucia	1	1	0	0	7	0
Saint Vincent and the Grenadines	3	3	0	0	16	0
Suriname	2	2	0	0	8	1
Trinidad and Tobago	5	2	1	2	4	4
United States	1	0	0	1	0	10
Uruguay	2	0	0	2	1	8
U.S. Virgin Islands	2	2	0	0	13	0
Venezuela	1	0	1	0	1	1
Total	72	32	13	27	169	157

- Source: FIFA

== Staff ==
=== Coaching staff ===
As of September 13, 2021

Role	Name
Head coach	(United States) Nat González
Assistant coach	(United States) Carlos Juárez
Assistant coach	(Uruguay) Alejandro Laín
Goalkeeper coach	(Argentina) Sebastián Uranga

=== Manager history ===
- (Uruguay) Carlos Avedissian (2015–2016)
- (Poland) Shek Borkowski (2017–2018)
- (Spain) David Guillemat (2018–2019)
- (United States) Juan Carlos Parra (2019–2021)
- (England) Chris Brown (2021)
- (United States) Nat González (2021–)

== Players ==
=== Current squad ===
- The following players were named to the squad for the 2026 CONCACAF W Championship qualification game against Saint Lucia, to be played on 1 December 2025.

Caps and goals are current as of February 19, 2025.

No.	Pos.	Player	Date of birth (age)	Caps	Goals	Club
1	GK	Sydney Martinez	September 12, 1999 (age 27)	8	0	(United States Soccer Federation) Carolina Ascent FC
12	GK	Cristina Roque	November 6, 2001 (age 25)	4	0	(United States Soccer Federation) Utah Royals
23	GK	Alondra Iriarte	April 11, 2006 (age 20)	0	0	(United States Soccer Federation) Georgia State Panthers
2	DF	Verónica García	December 23, 1999 (age 26)	11	0	(Croatian Football Federation) Osijek
3	DF	Caitlin Cosme	January 19, 1999 (age 27)	2	0	(French Football Federation) Nantes
4	DF	Idelys Vázquez	September 21, 2000 (age 26)	9	0	(Romanian Football Federation) CSM Unirea Alba Iulia
5	DF	Madison Cox	October 24, 1995 (age 31)	13	1	(Croatian Football Federation) Osijek
16	DF	Amber DiOrio	October 21, 1999 (age 27)	8	0	
17	DF	Imani Morlock	June 14, 1997 (age 29)	9	0	(Football Association of Indonesia) Dewa United Banten
20	DF	Gemma Gillespie	February 6, 2006 (age 20)	8	0	(United States Soccer Federation) Butler Bulldogs
6	MF	Maria Tapia	March 29, 2008 (age 18)	3	0	(United States Soccer Federation) Carolina Ascent
10	MF	Jailene DeJesus	May 10, 2003 (age 23)	8	2	(United States Soccer Federation) St. John's Red Storm
13	MF	Emma González	May 7, 2004 (age 22)	3	0	(United States Soccer Federation) San Diego Toreros
14	MF	Jill Aguilera	January 5, 1998 (age 28)	13	4	(United States Soccer Federation) Carolina Ascent
18	MF	Josephine Cotto	January 15, 2000 (age 26)	10		(German Football Association) FFC HOF
19	MF	Estefania González	May 12, 2006 (age 20)			(Royal Spanish Football Federation) Madrid CFF
21	MF	Jaydah Bedoya	March 20, 2002 (age 24)			(United States Soccer Federation) DC Power
22	MF	Marilia Nieves	February 10, 2006 (age 20)			(United States Soccer Federation) Kentucky Wildcats
	MF	Camila Adame	April 1, 2009 (age 17)			(United States Soccer Federation) Sporting JAX
	MF	Jessica Torres	November 4, 2004 (age 22)			(United States Soccer Federation) Creighton Bluejays
7	FW	Danielle Marcano	August 20, 1997 (age 29)	4	1	(Royal Spanish Football Federation) Valencia CF
8	FW	Ashley McMahon	June 18, 2006 (age 20)	3	0	(United States Soccer Federation) Fairfield Stags
9	FW	Gloria Douglas	May 4, 1992 (age 34)	6	0	(Royal Spanish Football Federation) CD Argual
11	FW	Cristina Torres	October 3, 2000 (age 26)	10	2	(Mexican Football Federation) UNAM
15	FW	Kennedy Garcia	February 16, 2005 (age 21)	3	0	(United States Soccer Federation) Alabama Crimson Tide

(Players are listed within position group by kit number, order of caps, then alphabetically)

=== Recent call-ups ===
The following players have also been called up to the Puerto Rican squad within the last 12 months.

Pos.	Player	Date of birth (age)	Caps	Goals	Club	Latest call-up
Notes: ALT = Alternate; INJ = Withdrew due to an injury.; PRE = Preliminary roster; RET = Retired from the national team.

(Players are listed within position group by order of latest call-up, caps, and then alphabetically)

== Records ==
=== Most capped players ===
#	Player	Year(s)	Caps
1	Karina Socarrás	2012–	25

=== Top goalscorers ===
#	Player	Year(s)	Goals	Caps
1	Karina Socarrás	2012–	25	25

== Competitive record ==
=== FIFA Women's World Cup ===
FIFA Women's World Cup record
Year	Result	Pld	W	D*	L	GF	GA
(China) 1991	Did not enter						
(Sweden) 1995	Did not enter						
(United States) 1999	Did not enter						
(United States) 2003	Did not qualify						
(China) 2007	Did not enter						
(Germany) 2011	Did not qualify						
(Canada) 2015	Did not qualify						
(France) 2019	Did not qualify						
(Australia) (New Zealand) 2023	Did not qualify						
(Brazil) 2027	To be determined						
(Costa Rica) (Jamaica) (Mexico) (United States) 2031	To be determined						
(United Kingdom) 2035	To be determined						
Total	—	–	–	–	–	–	–

*Draws include knockout matches decided on penalty kicks.

=== Olympic Games ===
Summer Olympics record									Qualifying record					
Year	Round	Position	Pld	W	D*	L	GF	GA	Pld	W	D*	L	GF	GA
(United States) 1996	Did not enter								1995 FIFA WWC					
(Australia) 2000	Did not enter								1999 FIFA WWC					
(Greece) 2004	Did not enter								Did not enter					
(China) 2008	Did not qualify								4	3	0	1	7	2
(United Kingdom) 2012	Did not enter								Did not enter					
(Brazil) 2016	Did not qualify								8	4	0	4	25	28
(Japan) 2020	Did not qualify								2	1	0	1	7	3
(France) 2024	Did not qualify								2022 CONCACAF W Championship					
(United States) 2028	Did not qualify								2026 CONCACAF W Championship					
Total	—	–	–	–	–	–	–	–	18	11	0	7	54	39

*Draws include knockout matches decided on penalty kicks.

=== CONCACAF W Championship ===
CONCACAF W Championship record								Qualification record					
Year	Result	Pld	W	D*	L	GF	GA	Pld	W	D*	L	GF	GA
(Haiti) 1991	Did not enter							Did not enter					
(United States) 1993	Did not enter							Did not enter					
(Canada) 1994	Did not enter							Did not enter					
(Canada) 1998	Group stage	3	0	0	3	0	38	Unknown					
(United States) 2000	Did not enter							Did not enter					
(United States) (Canada) 2002	Did not qualify							2	0	0	2	0	11
(United States) 2006	Did not enter							did not enter					
(Mexico) 2010	Did not qualify							5	3	0	2	24	6
(United States) 2014	Did not qualify							2014 Caribbean Cup					
(United States) 2018	Did not qualify							4	2	2	0	17	2
(Mexico) 2022	Did not qualify							4	3	0	1	15	6
(United States) 2026	Did not qualify							4	3	0	1	26	6
Total	Group stage	3	0	0	3	0	38	19	11	2	6	82	31

*Draws include knockout matches decided on penalty kicks.

=== CONCACAF W Gold Cup ===
CONCACAF W Gold Cup record								Qualification record							
Year	Result	GP	W	D*	L	GF	GA	Division	Group	GP	W	D*	L	GF	GA
(United States) 2024	Group Stage	3	1	0	2	2	4	A	A	5	2	1	2	4	6
(N/A) 2029	To be determined							To be determined							
Total	–	–	–	–	–	–	–	–	–	4	4	0	0	16	2

*Draws include knockout matches decided on penalty kicks.

=== Pan American Games ===
Pan American Games record
Year	Result	Pld	W	D*	L	GF	GA
(Canada) 1999	Did not enter						
(Dominican Republic) 2003	Did not enter						
(Brazil) 2007	Did not enter						
(Mexico) 2011	Did not qualify						
(Canada) 2015	Did not qualify						
(Peru) 2019	Did not qualify						
(Chile) 2023	Did not qualify						
Total	—	–	–	–	–	–	–

*Draws include knockout matches decided on penalty kicks.

=== Central American and Caribbean Games ===
Central American and Caribbean Games record
Year	Result	Pld	W	D*	L	GF	GA
(Puerto Rico) 2010	Fifth place	5	1	2	2	7	8
(Mexico) 2014	Did not enter						
(Colombia) 2018	Did not enter						
(El Salvador) 2023	Group stage	3	0	2	1	3	7
(Dominican Republic) 2026	Group stage	3	1	1	1	1	3
Total	3/5	11	2	5	4	11	18

*Draws include knockout matches decided on penalty kicks.

=== CFU Women's Caribbean Cup ===
CFU Women's Caribbean Cup record
Year	Result	Pld	W	D*	L	GF	GA
(Haiti) 2000	Did not enter						
(Trinidad and Tobago) 2014	Final round	5	2	1	2	8	10
2018	Did not enter						
Total	Final	5	2	1	2	8	10

*Draws include knockout matches decided on penalty kicks.

== Honours ==
=== Friendly ===
- Turkish Women's Cup
  - (gold) Champions (1): 2025

== See also ==
- Sport in Puerto Rico
  - Football in Puerto Rico
    - Women's football in Puerto Rico
- Puerto Rico women's national under-20 football team
- Puerto Rico women's national under-17 football team
- Puerto Rico men's national football team
- Puerto Rico men's national under-20 football team
- Puerto Rico men's national under-17 football team
- Puerto Rico men's national beach soccer team
