= 2021 Baltic Women's Cup =

Association football tournament

Tournament details
- Host country: Lithuania
- Dates: 10–13 June 2021
- Teams: 4 (from 1 confederation)
- Venue: 2 (in 2 host cities)

Final positions
- Champions: Lithuania (5th title)
- Runners-up: Faroe Islands
- Third place: Estonia
- Fourth place: Latvia

Tournament statistics
- Matches played: 4
- Goals scored: 14 (3.5 per match)
- Top scorer(s): (Lithuania) Liucija Vaitukaitytė (2 goals)

The 2021 Baltic Women's Cup was 21st Baltic Cup, is an international women's football tournament contested by the Baltic states. Originally scheduled to be held in the summer 2020, but the tournament was postponed due to the COVID-19 pandemic and rescheduled for 10 to 13 June 2021.

== Participating nations ==
The FIFA Women's Rankings of participating Women's national football team as of 16 April 2021.

Country	Appearance	Previous best performance	FIFA ranking 16 April 2021
Faroe Islands	2nd	Champions (2016)	93
Latvia	21st	Champions (1997, 2011, 2017, 2018, 2019)	97
Lithuania (Host)	21st	Champions (1996, 1998, 2007, 2015, 2021)	108
Estonia	21st	Champions (2003, 2004, 2005, 2006, 2008, 2009, 2010, 2012, 2013, 2014)	116

== Venues ==
Alytus	Jonava
Alytus Stadium	Central Stadium of Jonava
Capacity: 3,748	Capacity: 2,000
2021 Baltic Women's Cup is located in Lithuania

== Knockout stage ==
- Times listed are UTC+3:00
- In the knockout stage, extra-time and a penalty shoot-out was used to decide the winner if necessary.

== Bracket ==
Semi-finals
10 June –Alytus
Estonia	1 (4)
Faroe Islands (p)	1 (5)
10 June – Jonava
Lithuania	5
Latvia	0

Final
13 June – Alytus
Faroe Islands	0
Lithuania	2
Third place
13 June – Jonava
Latvia	1
Estonia	4

== Semi-finals ==
10 June 2021
16:00 UTC+3

Estonia	1–1	Faroe Islands
Kubassova 55'	Report	Johannesen 41'
Penalties
Himanen (penalty scored); Aarna (penalty missed); Laas (penalty scored); Rosen (penalty scored); Raadik (penalty scored); Daut (penalty missed)	4–5	Sevdal (penalty scored); Johannesen (penalty scored); Torolvsdottir (penalty missed); Johannesen (penalty scored); Lamhauge (penalty scored); Olsen (penalty scored)

Alytus Stadium, Alytus
10 June 2021
18:00 UTC+3

Lithuania	5–0	Latvia
Sarkanaitė 8'; Vaitukaitytė 11' (pen.), 52'; Mikutaitė 37'; Liužinaitė 56'	Report

Central Stadium of Jonava, Jonava

== Third place ==
13 June 2021
12:00 UTC+3

Estonia	4–1	Latvia
Tammik 16'; Brant 28'; Himanen 43'; Lillemäe 45+3'	Report	Fedotova 90+5'

Central Stadium of Jonava, Jonava

== Final ==
13 June 2021
14:00 UTC+3

Lithuania	2–0	Faroe Islands
Jonušaitė 16'; Lazdakaitė 78'	Report

Alytus Stadium, Alytus

== Statistics ==
=== Goalscorers ===
There were 14 goals scored in 4 matches, for an average of 3.5 goals per match.

2 goals

- (Lithuania) Liucija Vaitukaitytė

1 goal

- (Estonia) Vlada Kubassova
- (Estonia) Lisette Tammik
- (Estonia) Berle Brant
- (Estonia) Kairi Himanen
- (Estonia) Mari-Liis Lillemäe
- (Faroe Islands) Ásla Johannesen
- (Latvia) Renāte Fedotova
- (Lithuania) Algimantė Mikutaitė
- (Lithuania) Milda Liužinaitė
- (Lithuania) Paulina Sarkanaitė
- (Lithuania) Rimantė Jonušaitė
- (Lithuania) Ugnė Lazdauskaitė
