= Lora Petrova =

Bulgarian female footballer

Personal information
- Date of birth: 12 October 1998 (age 28)
- Place of birth: Belene, Bulgaria
- Position: Midfielder

Senior career*
Years	Team	Apps	(Gls)
- NSA Sofia

International career^{‡}
2014	Bulgaria U17	3	(1)
2015–2016	Bulgaria U19	6	(1)
2019–	Bulgaria	45	(5)
- * Club domestic league appearances and goals ‡ National team caps and goals as of 9 June 2026 (UTC)

Lora Petrova (Bulgarian: Лора Петрова; born in Belene on 12 October 1998) is a Bulgarian footballer who plays as a midfielder for the Bulgaria women's national team.

== International career ==
Petrova capped for Bulgaria at senior level in a 0–6 friendly loss to Croatia on 14 June 2019.

== International goals ==
No.	Date	Venue	Opponent	Score	Result	Competition
1.	19 February 2022	Goldcity Sport Complex, Alanya, Turkey	Lithuania	1–0	2–3	2022 Turkish Women's Cup
2.	12 July 2024	Vazgen Sargsyan Republican Stadium, Yerevan, Armenia	Armenia	1–0	3–1	UEFA Women's Euro 2025 qualifying
3.	21 February 2025	Stadion Aleksandar Shalamanov, Sofia, Bulgaria	Israel	1–0	1–3	2025 UEFA Women's Nations League
4.	18 April 2026	Fadil Vokrri Stadium, Pristina, Kosovo	Kosovo	1–0	1–2	2027 FIFA Women's World Cup qualification
5.	5 June 2026	Stadion Aleksandar Shalamanov, Sofia, Bulgaria	Gibraltar	3–0	3–1	2027 FIFA Women's World Cup qualification
