= Anastasia Klimova =

Ukrainian footballer (born 1994)

Personal information
- Full name: Anastasia Nikolaevna Klimova
- Date of birth: 19 September 1994 (age 32)
- Place of birth: Odesa, Ukraine
- Position: Goalkeeper

Team information
- Current team: Yenisey

Senior career*
Years	Team	Apps	(Gls)
2012–2014	Ilyichevka	29	(0)
2014–2015	Yatran-Berestivets	7	(0)
2015–2016	Lehenda Chernihiv	10	(0)
2017	AFD Omenmen		
2017	Martve		
2018	Torpedo	13	(0)
2019	Isloch-RGUOR	9	(0)
2019–2020	Shirak-Homenmen		
2020–	Yenisey	0	(0)

International career^{‡}
2020–	Armenia	2	(0)
- * Club domestic league appearances and goals as of 3 July 2019 ‡ National team caps and goals as of 6 March 2020

Anastasia Nikolaevna Klimova (Ukrainian: Анастасія Миколаївна Клімова, Armenian: Անաստասիա Նիկոլաևնա Կլիմովա; born 19 September 1994) is a footballer who plays as a goalkeeper for Russian club Yenisey. Born in Ukraine, she represents the Armenia women's national team.

== International career ==
Klimova capped for Armenia at senior level in two friendlies against Lithuania on 4 and 6 March 2020.

== See also ==
- List of Armenia women's international footballers
