= 2022 Turkish Women's Cup =

27th edition of the Algarve Cup

Tournament details
- Host country: Turkey
- Dates: 16–22 February
- Teams: 6 (from 3 confederations)

Final positions
- Champions: Ukraine (1st title)
- Runners-up: Venezuela
- Third place: Uzbekistan
- Fourth place: Latvia

Tournament statistics
- Matches played: 9
- Goals scored: 17 (1.89 per match)
- Top scorer(s): (Latvia) Sandra Voitāne (Lithuania) Liucija Vaitukaitytė (Ukraine) Daryna Apanashchenko (Ukraine) Olha Ovdiychuk (2 goals)

The 2022 Turkish Women's Cup was the sixth edition of the Turkish Women's Cup, an invitational women's football tournament held annually in Turkey. It took place from 16 to 22 February 2022.

== Teams ==
Six teams were participating.

Team	FIFA Rankings (December 2021)
Ukraine	35
Uzbekistan	45
Venezuela	52
Bulgaria	81
Lithuania	102
Latvia	112

== Standings ==
Pos	Team	Pld	W	D	L	GF	GA	GD	Pts
1st place, gold medalist(s)	Ukraine	3	3	0	0	5	0	+5	9
2nd place, silver medalist(s)	Venezuela	3	1	1	1	3	1	+2	4
3rd place, bronze medalist(s)	Uzbekistan	3	1	1	1	1	2	−1	4
4	Latvia	3	1	1	1	2	4	−2	4
5	Lithuania	3	1	0	2	3	4	−1	3
6	Bulgaria	3	0	1	2	3	6	−3	1

Source: Soccerway
Rules for classification: 1) Points; 2) Goal difference; 3) Goals scored; 4) Head-to-head points; 5) Head-to-head goal difference.

== Results ==
All times are local (UTC+3)

16 February 2022
10:00

Bulgaria	1–1	Latvia
Naydenova 88' (pen.)	Report (LFF); Report (BFU)	Voitāne 24' (pen.)

Goldcity Sport Complex, Alanya
16 February 2022
14:00

Uzbekistan	1–0	Lithuania
Khabibullaeva 66'	Report

Goldcity Sport Complex, Alanya
16 February 2022
17:30

Ukraine	1–0	Venezuela
Ovdiychuk 13'	Report

Goldcity Sport Complex, Alanya
Referee: Durmush Gamze (Turkey)

19 February 2022
10:00

Venezuela	3–0	Latvia
Campos 33'; García 61'; Sánchez 89'	Report

Goldcity Sport Complex, Alanya
19 February 2022
14:00

Bulgaria	2–3	Lithuania
Petrova 9'; Dineva 43'	Report	Zabolotnaja 19'; Vaitukaitytė 21', 84'

Goldcity Sport Complex, Alanya
19 February 2022
17:30

Ukraine	2–0	Uzbekistan
Ovdiychuk 49'; Apanashchenko 66'	Report

Goldcity Sport Complex, Alanya

22 February 2022
10:00

Lithuania	0–1	Latvia
	Report	Voitāne 5'

Goldcity Sport Complex, Alanya
22 February 2022
13:30

Ukraine	2–0	Bulgaria
Khrystiuk 58'; Hlushchenko 90+1'	Report

Goldcity Sport Complex, Alanya
22 February 2022
17:30

Uzbekistan	0–0	Venezuela

Goldcity Sport Complex, Alanya
Referee: Cansu Tiryaki (Turkey)

== Goalscorers ==
There were 17 goals scored in 9 matches, for an average of 1.89 goals per match.

2 goals

- (Latvia) Sandra Voitāne
- (Lithuania) Liucija Vaitukaitytė
- (Ukraine) Daryna Apanashchenko
- (Ukraine) Olha Ovdiychuk

1 goal

- (Bulgaria) Yana Dineva
- (Bulgaria) Ivana Naydenova
- (Bulgaria) Lora Petrova
- (Lithuania) Karolina Zabolotnaja
- (Ukraine) Anastasiya Voronina
- (Uzbekistan) Diyorakhon Khabibullaeva
- (Venezuela) Kimberlyn Campos
- (Venezuela) Gabriela García
- (Venezuela) Bárbara Sánchez
