= Liucija Vaitukaitytė =

Lithuanian footballer

Personal information
- Date of birth: 24 April 2000 (age 26)
- Place of birth: Dusetos, Lithuania
- Height: 1.69 m (5 ft 7 in)
- Position: Midfielder

Team information
- Current team: Nantes
- Number: 14

Youth career
- 2007–2012: FK Dusetų Ainiai
- 2012–2014: MFA Žalgiris

Senior career*
Years	Team	Apps	(Gls)
2015–2017	LSU Žara / Kauno Žalgiris		(28)
2018	Gintra Universitetas		(3)
2018	Granadilla	2	(0)
2019	Sevilla	2	(0)
2019–2021	Racing Santander		
2020	→Utenis	12	(5)
2021–2022	Pomigliano	22	(1)
2022–2023	Parma	9	(0)
2023–2026	Como	68	(1)
2026–	Nantes	0	(0)

International career^{‡}
2013–2014	Lithuania U15	2	(2)
2013–2016	Lithuania U17		(5)
2016–2018	Lithuania U19		(2)
2015–	Lithuania	62	(10)
- * Club domestic league appearances and goals as of 21:09, 7 August 2026 (UTC) ‡ National team caps and goals as of 9 June 2026 (UTC)

Liucija Vaitukaitytė (born 24 April 2000) is a Lithuanian professional footballer who plays as a midfielder for Première Ligue club Nantes Lithuania national team. She previously played in Italy for Pomigliano and Como and in Spain for Granadilla, Sevilla and Racing Santander.

== Club career ==
In December 2020, Vaitukaitytė was the only female Lithuanian footballer to be playing professionally outside the country.

On 15 July 2026, Vaitukaitytė was announced to have signed a two-year contract with French Première Ligue club Nantes.

== International career ==
Vaitukaitytė has been capped for the Lithuania national team, appearing for the team during the 2019 FIFA Women's World Cup qualifying cycle. She made her senior debut in 2015.

Vaitukaitytė was named Lithuanian Footballer of the Year in February 2021 and in January 2022.

== International goals ==
No.	Date	Venue	Opponent	Score	Result	Competition
1.	12 March 2017	Parekklisia Stadium, Parekklisia, Cyprus	Bahrain	2–0	2–0	2017 Aphrodite Women Cup
2.	15 March 2017	Tsirio Stadium, Limassol, Cyprus	Malta	1–1	1–1 (3–1 p)	2017 Aphrodite Women Cup
3.	10 April 2021	Pyunik Training Centre, Yerevan, Armenia	Lebanon	2–0	7–1	2021 Armenia Women's International Friendly Tournament
2.	10 April 2021	Pyunik Training Centre, Yerevan, Armenia	Lebanon	4–0	7–1	2021 Armenia Women's International Friendly Tournament
4.	12 April 2021	Pyunik Training Centre, Yerevan, Armenia	Armenia	2–1	2–2	2021 Armenia Women's International Friendly Tournament
5.	10 June 2021	Central Stadium of Jonava, Jonava, Lithuania	Latvia	2–0	5–0	2021 Baltic Women's Cup
6.	10 June 2021	Central Stadium of Jonava, Jonava, Lithuania	Latvia	4–0	5–0	2021 Baltic Women's Cup
7.	19 February 2022	Goldcity Sport Complex, Alanya, Turkey	Bulgaria	2–1	3–2	2022 Turkish Women's Cup
8.	19 February 2022	Goldcity Sport Complex, Alanya, Turkey	Bulgaria	3–2	3–2	2022 Turkish Women's Cup
9.	17 February 2023	Yerevan Football Academy, Yerevan, Armenia	Armenia	2–0	3–1	Friendly
10.	31 October 2023	Mikheil Meskhi Stadium, Tbilisi, Georgia	Georgia	2–0	3–0	2023–24 UEFA Women's Nations League
11.	27 October 2024	Jānis Skredelis' Stadium, Riga, Latvia	Faroe Islands	1–1	1–2	2024 Women's Baltic Cup
12.	9 June 2026	LSC Druskininkai Stadium, Druskininkai, Lithuania	Liechtenstein	2–0	2–0	2027 FIFA Women's World Cup qualification
