= Ksenia Garanina =

Russian-born Armenian footballer (born 1997)

Personal information
- Full name: Ksenia Sergeevna Garanina
- Date of birth: 17 April 1997 (age 29)
- Place of birth: Votkinsk, Russia
- Position: Forward

Team information
- Current team: Shirak-Homenmen

Senior career*
| Years | Team | Apps | (Gls) |
| 2013–2014 | Zenit | | |
| 2015–2018 | Torpedo | 13+ | (0+) |
| 2019– | Shirak-Homenmen | | |

International career^{‡}
| 2020– | Armenia | 1 | (0) |
- * Club domestic league appearances and goals as of 23 October 2018 ‡ National team caps and goals as of 6 March 2020

Ksenia Sergeevna Garanina (Russian: Ксения Гаранина, Armenian: Կսենիա Գարանինա; born 17 April 1997) is a footballer who plays as a forward for Shirak-Homenmen. Born in Russia, she represents the Armenia women's national team.

== International career ==
Garanina capped for Armenia at senior level in a 1–1 friendly draw against Lithuania on 6 March 2020.

== See also ==
- List of Armenia women's international footballers
