= Vitali Glushchenko =

Vitali Glushchenko can refer to:

- Vitali Glushchenko (footballer) (born 1985), Russian footballer
- Vitali Glushchenko (skier) (born 1977), Russian Olympic skier
