= Algimantė Mikutaitė =

Lithuanian footballer

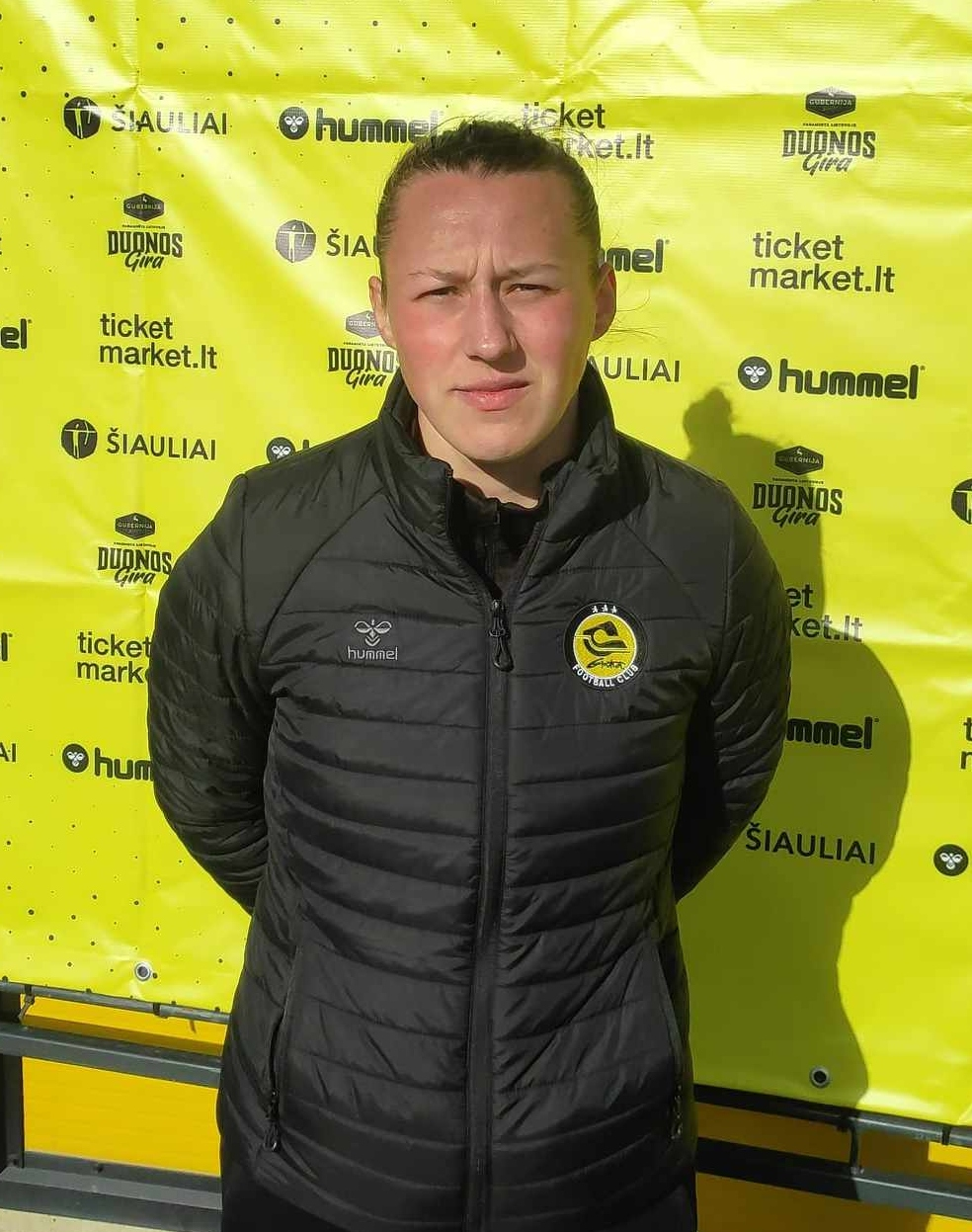

Personal information
- Date of birth: 7 December 1996 (age 29)
- Place of birth: Lithuania
- Height: 1.62 m (5 ft 4 in)
- Position: Defender

Team information
- Current team: FC Gintra

Senior career*
Years	Team	Apps	(Gls)
2012–2021	FC Gintra	?	(?)
2022	SE AEM	?	(?)
2022–	FC Gintra	22	(1)

International career^{‡}
	Lithuania	71	(1)
- * Club domestic league appearances and goals as of 14 August 2023 ‡ National team caps and goals as of 1 April 2026 (UTC)

Algimantė Mikutaitė (born 7 December 1996) is a Lithuanian footballer who plays as a defender and has appeared for the Lithuania women's national team.

== Career ==
From the 2012 season she played for Lithianian champions FC Gintra, remaining with the club for ten years.

In January 2022 she signed with Catalan club SE AEM.

Mikutaitė has been capped for the Lithuania national team, appearing for the team during the 2019 FIFA Women's World Cup qualifying cycle.

== International goals ==
No.	Date	Venue	Opponent	Score	Result	Competition
1.	10 June 2021	Central Stadium of Jonava, Jonava, Lithuania	Latvia	3–0	5–0	2021 Baltic Women's Cup
