= Maral Artin =

Armenian footballer (born 2000)

Personal information
- Date of birth: 9 June 2000 (age 26)
- Place of birth: Heidelberg, Germany
- Height: 1.61 m (5 ft 3 in)
- Position: Forward

Team information
- Current team: Cordoba
- Number: 12

Youth career
- 1899 Hoffenheim
- 2016–2017: Bayern Munich

Senior career*
Years	Team	Apps	(Gls)
2016–2017	Bayern Munich II	6	(0)
2017–2019	FFC Frankfurt II	19	(1)
2019	Alashkert		
2019–	Arras FCF	3	(0)
20??–	Cordoba	0	(0)

International career^{‡}
2014	Germany U15	3	(3)
2015	Germany U16	1	(1)
2020–	Armenia	16	(3)
- * Club domestic league appearances and goals as of 2 November 2019 ‡ National team caps and goals as of 20 February 2023

Maral Artin (Armenian: Մարալ Արթին; born 9 June 2000) is an Armenian footballer who plays as a forward for Cordoba Féminin and the Armenia national team.

Born in Germany, she became B-Juniorinnen Bundesliga champion with Bayern Munich during her youth career.

== International career ==
Artin was capped for Armenia at senior level in two friendlies against Lithuania on 4 and 6 March 2020, and scored her first goal in her second appearance.

== International goals ==
No.	Date	Venue	Opponent	Score	Result	Competition
1.	8 April 2021	Pyunik Stadium, Yerevan, Armenia	Lebanon	2–0	2–0	2021 Armenia Women's International Friendly Tournament
2.	12 June 2021	Vazgen Sargsyan Republican Stadium, Yerevan, Armenia	Kazakhstan	2–0	2–1	Friendly
3.	31 May 2024	Armavir City Stadium, Armavir, Armenia	Kazakhstan	2–0	2–1	UEFA Women's Euro 2025 qualifying
4.	4 June 2024	Armavir City Stadium, Armavir, Armenia	Kazakhstan	1–3	1–4	UEFA Women's Euro 2025 qualifying
5.	21 February 2025	Armavir City Stadium, Armavir, Armenia	Liechtenstein	1–0	6–1	2025 UEFA Women's Nations League
6.	7 October 2026	Al-Aqaba Stadium, Aqaba, Jordan	Jordan	2–0	2–1	Friendly

== See also ==
- List of Armenia women's international footballers
