= Rimantė Jonušaitė =

Lithuanian footballer (born 2003)

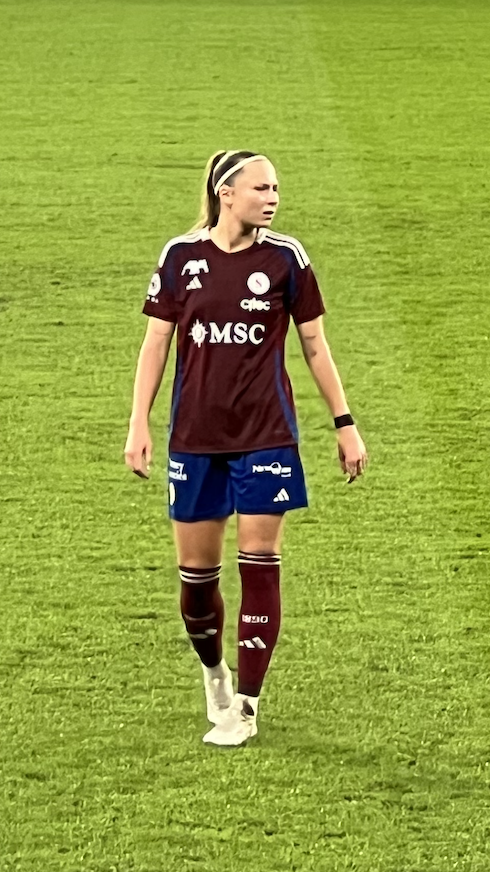
- Jonušaitė playing with Servette in 2024.

Personal information
- Date of birth: 25 October 2003 (age 23)
- Place of birth: Mažeikiai, Lithuania
- Height: 1.71 m (5 ft 7 in)
- Position: Forward

Team information
- Current team: RSC Anderlecht (women)
- Number: 20

Senior career*
Years	Team	Apps	(Gls)
2017–2018	Triumfas	20	(33)
2018–2021	Gintra Universitetas	60	(141)
2021–2024	A.C. Milan	4	(0)
2024–2025	Servette FC Chênois	34	(9)
2025–	RSC Anderlecht	6	(2)
- Total

International career^{‡}
2017	Lithuania U15	2	(4)
2018–2019	Lithuania U17	9	(7)
2019–	Lithuania	39	(14)
- * Club domestic league appearances and goals as of 10:47, 11 July 2024 (UTC) ‡ National team caps and goals as of 18 April 2025 (UTC)

Rimantė Jonušaitė (born 25 October 2003) is a Lithuanian footballer who played as a forward for Servette FC Chênois on loan from A.C. Milan in the Serie A between January 2024 and the end of the 2023/2024 season before being transferred on a permanent basis to the Swiss club by signing a deal until 2026. She has appeared for the Lithuania women's national team.

== Career ==
Jonušaitė has been capped for the Lithuania national team, appearing for the team during the UEFA Women's Euro 2021 qualifying cycle.

== International goals ==
No.	Date	Venue	Opponent	Score	Result	Competition
1.	10 April 2021	Pyunik Training Centre, Yerevan, Armenia	Lebanon	1–0	7–1	2021 Armenia Women's International Friendly Tournament
2.	10 April 2021	Pyunik Training Centre, Yerevan, Armenia	Lebanon	3–0	7–1	2021 Armenia Women's International Friendly Tournament
3.	10 April 2021	Pyunik Training Centre, Yerevan, Armenia	Lebanon	6–1	7–1	2021 Armenia Women's International Friendly Tournament
4.	12 April 2021	Pyunik Training Centre, Yerevan, Armenia	Armenia	1–0	2–2	2021 Armenia Women's International Friendly Tournament
5.	13 June 2021	Alytus Stadium, Alytus, Lithuania	Faroe Islands	1–0	2–0	2021 Baltic Women's Cup
6.	5 April 2024	Mikheil Meskhi Stadium, Tbilisi, Georgia	Georgia	2–2	2–2	UEFA Women's Euro 2025 qualifying
7.	12 July 2024	Dasaki Stadium, Dasaki Achnas, Cyprus	Cyprus	1–1	2–1	UEFA Women's Euro 2025 qualifying
8.	12 July 2024	Dasaki Stadium, Dasaki Achnas, Cyprus	Cyprus	2–1	2–1	UEFA Women's Euro 2025 qualifying
9.	30 May 2025	Dalga Arena, Baku, Azerbaijan	Azerbaijan	1–0	5–0	2025 UEFA Women's Nations League
10.	30 May 2025	Dalga Arena, Baku, Azerbaijan	Azerbaijan	3–0	5–0	2025 UEFA Women's Nations League
11.	24 October 2025	Raudondvario Stadion, Raudondvaris, Lithuania	Faroe Islands	1–0	1–0	2025 Women's Baltic Cup
12.	29 November 2025	Sportland Arena, Tallinn, Estonia	Estonia	2–0	2–0	Friendly
13.	3 March 2026	Rheinpark Stadion, Vaduz, Liechtenstein	Liechtenstein	1–0	6–1	2027 FIFA Women's World Cup qualification
14.	3 March 2026	Rheinpark Stadion, Vaduz, Liechtenstein	Liechtenstein	3–1	6–1	2027 FIFA Women's World Cup qualification
15.	3 March 2026	Rheinpark Stadion, Vaduz, Liechtenstein	Liechtenstein	4–1	6–1	2027 FIFA Women's World Cup qualification
16.	3 March 2026	Rheinpark Stadion, Vaduz, Liechtenstein	Liechtenstein	5–1	6–1	2027 FIFA Women's World Cup qualification
17.	14 April 2026	Raudondvario Stadion, Raudondvaris, Lithuania	Bosnia and Herzegovina	1–0	2–0	2027 FIFA Women's World Cup qualification
18.	14 April 2026	Raudondvario Stadion, Raudondvaris, Lithuania	Bosnia and Herzegovina	2–0	2–0	2027 FIFA Women's World Cup qualification
