= Nelli Stepanyan =

Armenian association football player

Senior career*
Years	Team	Apps	(Gls)
- Kolej

International career^{‡}
2006–2007	Armenia	3	(0)
- * Club domestic league appearances and goals ‡ National team caps and goals as of 6 November 2007

Nelli Stepanyan (Armenian: Նելլի Ստեփանյան) is an Armenian football referee, a futsal player and a retired footballer. She has been a member of the Armenia women's national team.

== Club career ==
Stepanyan started her football career in 1991 and played for «Kolej», a club which had quite high results at the time.

== International career ==
Stepanyan capped for Armenia at senior level during the UEFA Women's Euro 2009 qualifying and in a friendly match against Croatia on 6 November 2007.

== Referee career ==
After retiring from playing in 2011, Stepanyan became a FIFA referee, serving in both the Armenian Premier League and international matches. She made her international debut as a referee and a fourth official in 2011. She has mainly appeared in women's football matches, but she has also worked as a fourth official in men's Armenian Premier League.

== See also ==
- List of Armenia women's international footballers
