= Laura Ruzgutė =

Lithuanian footballer

Personal information
- Date of birth: 9 October 1997 (age 29)
- Height: 1.62 m (5 ft 4 in)
- Position: Defender

International career^{‡}
Years	Team	Apps	(Gls)
- Lithuania
- ‡ National team caps and goals as of 19:10, 30 August 2019 (UTC)

Laura Ruzgutė (born 9 October 1997) is a Lithuanian footballer who plays as a defender for the Lithuania national team.

== Career ==
Ruzgutė has been capped for the Lithuania national team, appearing for the team during the 2019 FIFA Women's World Cup qualifying cycle.

== International goals ==
No.	Date	Venue	Opponent	Score	Result	Competition
1.	10 April 2021	Pyunik Training Centre, Yerevan, Armenia	Lebanon	7–1	7–1	2021 Armenia Women's International Friendly Tournament
