= Berle Brant =

Estonian footballer

Personal information
- Date of birth: 26 September 1989 (age 37)
- Place of birth: Halinga, Estonia
- Position: Defender

Team information
- Current team: Saku Sporting
- Number: 55

International career^{‡}
Years	Team	Apps	(Gls)
2019–	Estonia	25	(1)
- ‡ National team caps and goals as of 19:35, 26 September 2021 (UTC)

Berle Brant (born 26 September 1989) is an Estonian footballer who plays as a defender for Saku Sporting and the Estonia women's national team.

== Career ==
Brant has played for Pärnu JK in the UEFA Women's Champions League and has also represented Estonia at international level.

== International goals ==
No.	Date	Venue	Opponent	Score	Result	Competition
1.	13 June 2021	Central Stadium of Jonava, Jonava, Lithuania	Latvia	2–0	4–1	2021 Baltic Cup
