= 2021 Armenia Women's International Friendly Tournament =

Women's national association football tournament

Our Game International Friendly Tournament

Tournament details
- Host country: Armenia
- Dates: 7–12 April 2021
- Teams: 4 (from 2 sub-confederations)
- Venue: 2 (in 2 host cities)

Final positions
- Champions: Lithuania
- Runners-up: Armenia
- Third place: Jordan
- Fourth place: Lebanon

Tournament statistics
- Matches played: 6
- Goals scored: 23 (3.83 per match)
- Top scorer: (Lithuania) Rimantė Jonušaitė (4 goals)

The 2021 Armenia Women's International Friendly Tournament, also known as the Our Game International Friendly Tournament, was a friendly international women's football championship. It was held in Armenia from 7 to 12 April 2021, and was played by four teams: Lithuania, Armenia, Jordan, and Lebanon. The tournament was won by Lithuania, whereas hosts Armenia finished runners-up.

== Teams ==
=== Participants ===
Four teams entered the tournament.

Country	Confederation	FIFA ranking December 2020
Lithuania	UEFA	100
Armenia	UEFA	116
Jordan	AFC	NR
Lebanon	AFC	NR

== Group stage ==
Team	Pld	W	D	L	GF	GA	GD	Pts
Lithuania	3	2	1	0	10	3	+7	7
Armenia	3	1	2	0	5	3	+2	5
Jordan	3	1	1	1	7	2	+5	4
Lebanon	3	0	0	3	1	15	−14	0

Source: RSSSF
7 April 2021

Lithuania	1–0	Jordan
Lazdauskaitė 65'	Report

Charentsavan City Stadium, Charentsavan
8 April 2021

Armenia	2–0	Lebanon
Al Haddad 7' (o.g.); Artin 45'	Report

Pyunik Training Centre, Yerevan

10 April 2021

Lithuania	7–1	Lebanon
Jonušaitė 5', 16', 43'; Vaitukaitytė 12' (pen.), 31'; Lazdauskaitė 34'; Ruzgutė 57'	Report	El Tayar 32'

Pyunik Training Centre, Yerevan
10 April 2021

Armenia	1–1	Jordan
Osipyan 25'	Report	Jbarah 56'

Charentsavan City Stadium, Charentsavan

12 April 2021

Lebanon	0–6	Jordan
	Report	Jbarah 17', 61'; Fraij 20', 48'; Al-Masri 38'; Al-Btoush 72'

Charentsavan City Stadium, Charentsavan
12 April 2021

Armenia	2–2	Lithuania
Osipyan 42'; Avesyan 82' (pen.)	Report	Jonušaitė 5'; Vaitukaitytė 69'

Pyunik Training Centre, Yerevan

=== Champions ===
2021 Armenia Women's International Friendly Tournament champions

Lithuania

== Goalscorers ==
There were 23 goals scored in 6 matches, for an average of 3.83 goals per match.

4 goals

- (Lithuania) Rimantė Jonušaitė

3 goals

- (Jordan) Maysa Jbarah
- (Lithuania) Liucija Vaitukaitytė

2 goals

- (Armenia) Olga Osipyan
- (Jordan) Rouzbahan Fraij
- (Lithuania) Ugnė Lazdauskaitė

1 goal

- (Armenia) Maral Artin
- (Armenia) Nancy Avesyan
- (Jordan) Leen Al-Btoush
- (Jordan) Luna Al-Masri
- (Lebanon) Farah El Tayar
- (Lithuania) Laura Ruzgutė

1 own goal

- (Lebanon) Celine Al Haddad
