= Meda Šeškutė =

Lithuanian footballer

Personal information
- Date of birth: 1 August 2003 (age 23)
- Position: Goalkeeper

Team information
- Current team: Vicenza
- Number: 1

Senior career*
Years	Team	Apps	(Gls)
- MFA Žalgiris-MRU; Vicenza

International career^{‡}
2018–2019	Lithuania U19	9	(0)
2020–	Lithuania	33	(0)
- * Club domestic league appearances and goals ‡ National team caps and goals as of 1 April 2026

Meda Šeškutė (born 1 August 2003) is a Lithuanian footballer who plays as a goalkeeper for Serie B club Vicenza and the Lithuania women's national team.

== Club career ==
Šeškutė has played for Gintra Universitetas in Lithuania at the UEFA Women's Champions League.

== International career ==
Šeškutė capped for Lithuania at senior level during the UEFA Women's Euro 2022 qualifying.

== Personal life ==
Šeškutė's father, Arvydas, was also a goalkeeper.
