= Olha Ovdiychuk =

Ukrainian footballer (born 1993)

Olga Ovdiychuk
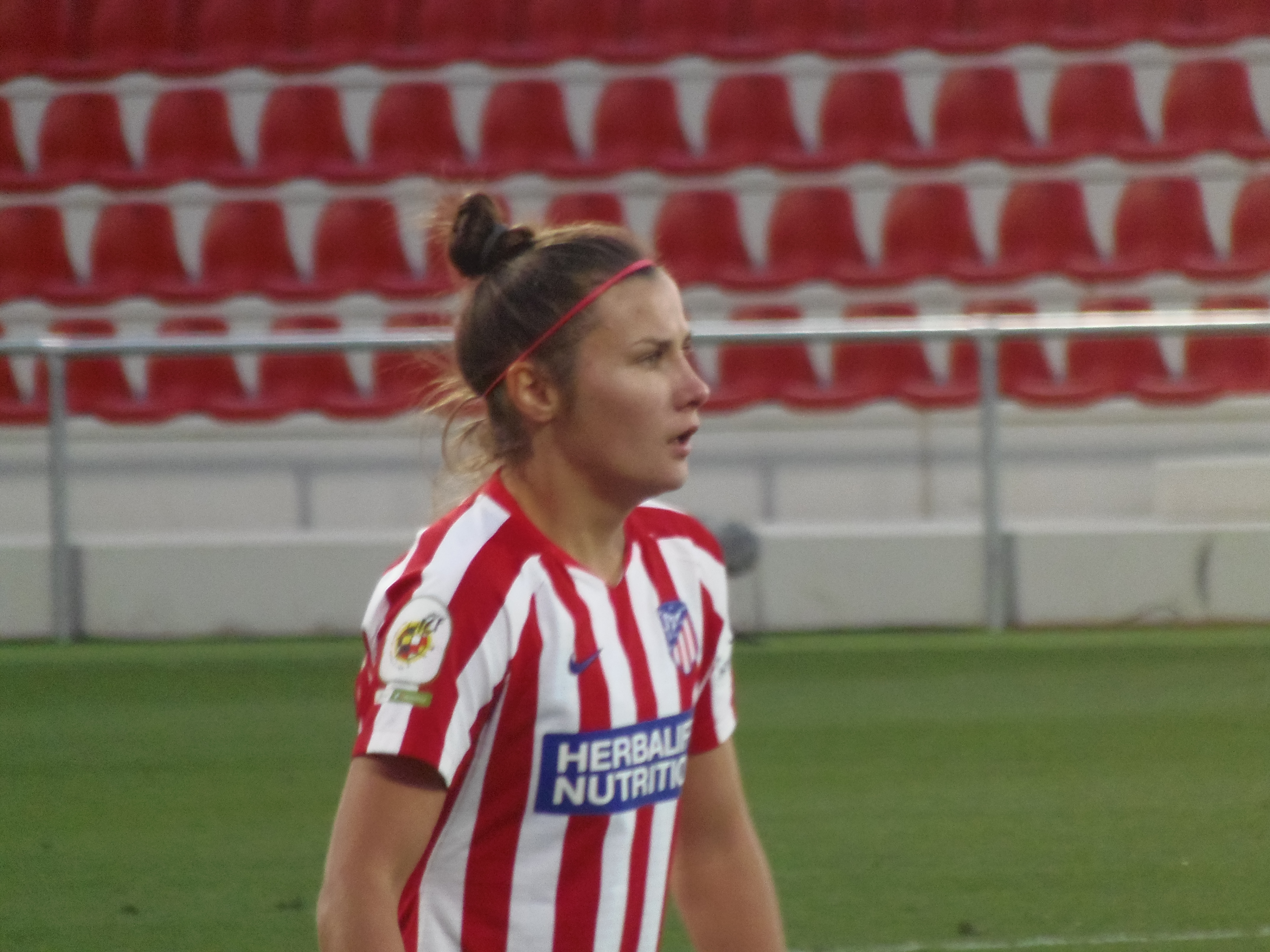
- November 2019

Personal information
- Full name: Olga Ovdiychuk
- Date of birth: 16 December 1993 (age 32)
- Place of birth: Diuksyn, Rivne Oblast, Ukraine
- Position: Forward

Team information
- Current team: Ankara BB Fomget
- Number: 77

Senior career*
Years	Team	Apps	(Gls)
2011	Lehenda-ShVSM Chernihiv		
2010–2012	Rodyna-Litsey Kostopil	28	(18)
2012–2019	Zhytlobud-1 Kharkiv	104	(135)
2019–2020	Atlético Madrid	8	(0)
2020–2022	Zhytlobud-1 Kharkiv	27	(30)
2022–	Ankara BB Fomget	106	(52)

International career
2010–2011	Ukraine U19	6	(1)
2012–	Ukraine	106	(20)
- * Club domestic league appearances and goals

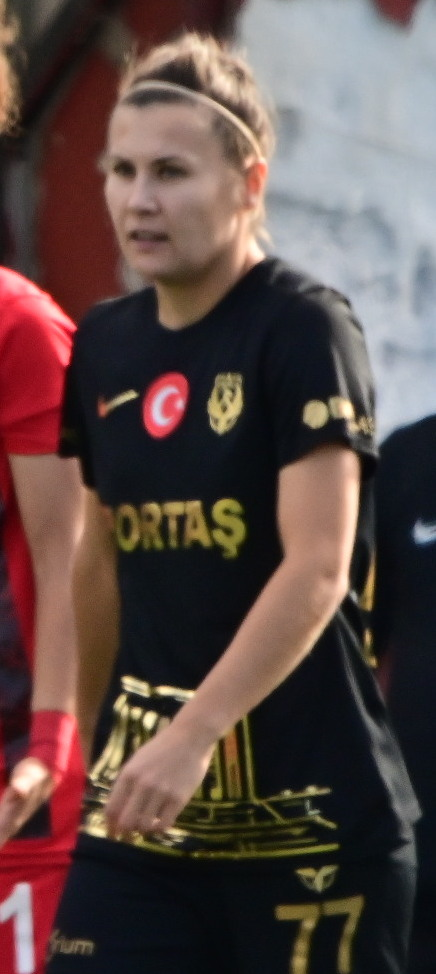
Ovdiychuk with Fomget.

Olga Ovdiychuk (Ukrainian: Ольга Вікторівна Овдійчук, romanized: Olha Viktorivna Ovdiichuk; born 16 December 1993) is a Ukrainian footballer, who plays as a forward for Ankara BB Fomget in the Turkish Women's Super League and the Ukraine women's national team.

== Club career ==
Ovdiychuk played her first match in the Ukrainian championship on May 1, 2009, against FC Yatran Uman. During the season 2011, she scored 12 goals in 12 national league matches, and her team, underdogs in previous seasons, finished at the 4th position. In 2012 she joined the Kharkiv team Zhytlobud-1 Kharkiv. With this club, she became champion of Ukraine several times. In summer 2019 she joined the team of Atlético Madrid, the Spanish champion. After 3 coaching changes in few months (Sánchez Vera, Pablo López, Dani González) and the strict lockdown measures due to the COVID-19 epidemic in Madrid, in summer 2020 Ovdiychuk decided to terminate her contract with Atlético Madrid and return to Ukraine.

After the 2022 Russian invasion of Ukraine, in March 2022 she moved to Turkey and, joined Ankara-based club Fomget to play in the second half of the 2021–22 Women's Super League. She won the champions title in the 2022–23 season, became runners-up the next season, and again won the champions title in the 2024–25 season.

== Career statistics ==
=== Club ===
As of 25 May 2026.

Club	Season	League			Cup		Continental		Total	
Club	Season	Division	Apps	Goals	Apps	Goals	Apps	Goals	Apps	Goals
Rodyna	2009	Ukrainian Women's League	4	2					4	2
Rodyna	2010	Ukrainian Women's League	12	4	1	0			13	4
Rodyna	2011	Ukrainian Women's League	12	12	1	0			13	12
Rodyna	Total		28	18	2	0			30	18
Lehenda	2011	Ukrainian Women's League					3	1	3	1
Zhytlobud-1	2012	Ukrainian Women's League	13	18	3	3	3	2	19	23
Zhytlobud-1	2013	Ukrainian Women's League	13	17	2	2	3	3	18	22
Zhytlobud-1	2014	Ukrainian Women's League	12	9	2	3	3	0	17	12
Zhytlobud-1	2015	Ukrainian Women's League	13	11	3	7	3	4	19	22
Zhytlobud-1	2016	Ukrainian Women's League	12	14	3	0	3	0	18	14
Zhytlobud-1	2017-18	Ukrainian Women's League	7	8					7	8
Zhytlobud-1	2018-19	Ukrainian Women's League	18	28	3	7			21	35
Zhytlobud-1	2019-20	Ukrainian Women's League			2	2			2	2
Zhytlobud-1	2020-21	Ukrainian Women's League	17	11	3	2			20	13
Zhytlobud-1	2021-22	Ukrainian Women's League	10	19			10	6	20	25
Zhytlobud-1	Total		131	165	24	31	29	16	184	212
Atlético Madrid	2019-20	Liga F	8	0	1	0	3	0	12	0
Ankara BB Fomget	2021–22	Super League	8	6	–	–			8	6
Ankara BB Fomget	2022-23	Super League	25	18	–	–			25	18
Ankara BB Fomget	2023–24	Super League	27	10	-	-	1	0	28	10
Ankara BB Fomget	2024–25	Super League	24	10	–	–			24	10
Ankara BB Fomget	2025–26	Super League	22	8	–	–	5	1	27	9
Ankara BB Fomget	Total		106	52	–	-	6	1	90	47
Total career			273	235	27	31	41	18	341	284

=== International ===
As of 9 January 2024

National team	Years	Apps	Goals
Ukraine	2012	1	0
Ukraine	2013	2	0
Ukraine	2014	11	2
Ukraine	2015	3	0
Ukraine	2016	9	2
Ukraine	2017	7	1
Ukraine	2018	12	1
Ukraine	2019	7	2
Ukraine	2020	6	1
Ukraine	2021	10	1
Ukraine	2022	6	2
Ukraine	2023	6	2
Total		80	14

== International goals ==
No.	Date	Venue	Opponent	Score	Result	Competition
1.	19 June 2014	Arena Lviv, Lviv, Ukraine	England	1–2	1–2	2015 FIFA Women's World Cup qualification
2.	2 August 2014	FFU Training Complex, Kyiv, Ukraine	Belarus	3–0	8–0	2015 FIFA Women's World Cup qualification
3.	15 September 2016	Stadionul Dr. Constantin Rădulescu, Cluj-Napoca, Romania	Romania	1–1	1–2	UEFA Women's Euro 2017 qualifying
6.	8 June 2018	Arena Lviv, Lviv, Ukraine	Denmark	1–4	1–5	2019 FIFA Women's World Cup qualification
9.	7 March 2020	Pinatar Arena, San Pedro del Pinatar, Spain	Northern Ireland	4–0	4–0	2020 Pinatar Cup
10.	20 February 2021	Gold City Sports Complex, Kargıcak, Turkey	Serbia	1–0	1–1	2021 Turkish Women's Cup
11.	16 February 2022	Gold City Sports Complex, Antalya, Turkey	Venezuela	1–0	1–0	2022 Turkish Women's Cup
12.	19 February 2022	Gold City Sports Complex, Antalya, Turkey	Uzbekistan	1–0	2–0	2022 Turkish Women's Cup
13.	28 June 2022	Stadion Miejski w Rzeszowie, Rzeszów, Poland	Hungary	2–0	2–0	2023 FIFA Women's World Cup qualification
14.	11 April 2023	Sportland Arena, Tallinn, Estonia	Estonia	1–0	1–0	Friendly
11.	22 September 2023	Stadion Miejski im. Kazimierza Deyny, Starogard Gdański, Poland	Serbia	1–0	1–2	2023–24 UEFA Women's Nations League
12.	27 February 2024	Mardan Sports Complex, Antalya, Turkey	Bulgaria	1–0	3–0	2023–24 UEFA Women's Nations League play-off matches
13.	21 February 2025	Niko Dovana Stadium, Durrës, Albania	Albania	1–0	2–1	2025 UEFA Women's Nations League
14.	4 April 2025	Stadion Gornik, Łęczna, Poland	Czech Republic	1–0	1–0	2025 UEFA Women's Nations League
15.	2 December 2025	Estadio El Palmar, Sanlucar de Barrameda, Spain	Austria	3–2	3–2	Friendly
16.	7 March 2026	Mardan Sports Complex, Antalya, Turkey	Spain	1–3	1–3	2027 FIFA Women's World Cup qualification

== Honours ==
=== Club ===
Ukrainian Women's League

Zhytlobud-1

Champions (7): 2012, 2013, 2014, 2015, 2018, 2019, 2021
Ukrainian Women's Cup

Zhytlobud-1
Champions (6): 2013, 2014, 2015, 2016, 2018, 2019

Turkish Women's Super League

Ankara BB Fomget
Champions (2): 2022–23, 2024–25
Runners-up (1): 2023–24

=== International ===
Turkish Women's Cup

Ukraina
Champions (1): 2022
