= Grete Daut =

Estonian footballer

Personal information
- Date of birth: 4 January 2000 (age 26)
- Place of birth: Tallinn, Estonia
- Position: Midfielder

Team information
- Current team: Saku Sporting
- Number: 4

Senior career*
| Years | Team | Apps | (Gls) |
| 2017 | Saku Sporting | | |
| 2018 | Flora | | |
| 2019- | Saku Sporting | | |

International career^{‡}
| 2015–2016 | Estonia U-17 | 13 | (0) |
| 2017–2018 | Estonia U-19 | 16 | (1) |
| 2019– | Estonia | 26 | (0) |
- * Club domestic league appearances and goals ‡ National team caps and goals as of 9 October 2025

Grete Daut (born 4 January 2000) is an Estonian footballer who plays as a midfielder for Saku Sporting and the Estonia women's national team.

== Career ==
She made her debut for the Estonia national team on 12 August 2020 against Latvia, coming on as a substitute for Mari-Liis Lillemäe.
