= Mari-Liis Lillemäe =

Estonian footballer (born 2000)

Mari Liis Lillemäe
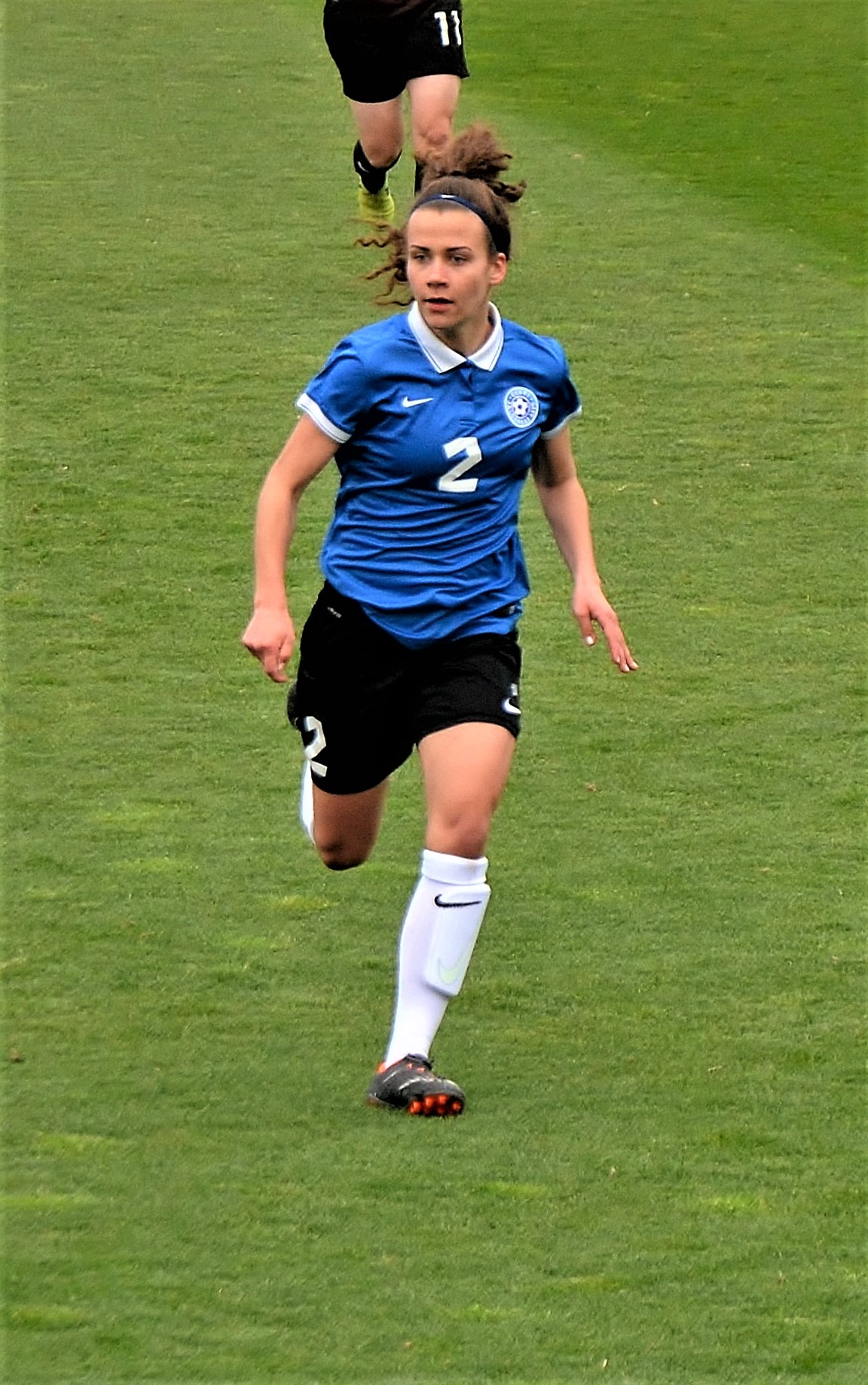

Personal information
- Date of birth: 1 September 2000 (age 26)
- Place of birth: Viljandi Parish, Estonia
- Position: Midfielder

Team information
- Current team: Catania

College career
Years	Team	Apps	(Gls)
2020–2021	UT Rio Grande Valley Vaqueros	15	(2)

Senior career*
Years	Team	Apps	(Gls)
2017–2023	Flora		
2023–2024	FC Wacker Innsbruck		
2025	Flora	22	(28)
2025–	FC Catania	11	(7)

International career^{‡}
2017–	Estonia	68	(4)
- * Club domestic league appearances and goals as of 14 April 2026 ‡ National team caps and goals as of 19 April 2026

Mari Liis Lillemäe (born 1 September 2000) is an Estonian footballer who plays as a midfielder for Flora and the Estonia women's national team.

== Career ==
Lillemäe has been capped for the Estonia national team, appearing for the team during the UEFA Women's Euro 2021 qualifying cycle.

== International goals ==
No.	Date	Venue	Opponent	Score	Result	Competition
1.	13 June 2021	Central Stadium of Jonava, Jonava, Lithuania	Latvia	4–0	4–1	2021 Baltic Cup
2.	10 November 2022	Stadion Topolica, Bar, Montenegro	Montenegro	1–0	1–1	Friendly
3.	21 February 2024	Gold City Sports Complex, Alanya, Turkey	India	3–4	3–4	2024 Turkish Women's Cup
4.	18 April 2026	Lilleküla Stadium, Tallinn, Estonia	Lithuania	1–1	2–1	2027 FIFA Women's World Cup qualification
