= Bárbara Sánchez (Venezuelan footballer) =

Venezuelan women footballer (born 1990)

Personal information
- Full name: Bárbara Virginia Sánchez Rondón
- Date of birth: 3 October 1990 (age 36)
- Positions: Midfielder; forward

Team information
- Current team: Universidad de Chile
- Number: 18

Senior career*
Years	Team	Apps	(Gls)
2018–	Universidad de Chile		

International career
2022–	Venezuela		
- * Club domestic league appearances and goals

Bárbara Virginia Sánchez Rondón (born 3 October 1990) is a Venezuelan footballer and futsal player who plays for Universidad de Chile and Venezuela National Team.

== Club career ==
Sanchéz moved to Chile in 2017 looking for better employment opportunities. She joined Universidad de Chile in 2018.

=== Season 2021 ===
In 2021 Championship Final, Sanchéz scored a goal against Santiago Morning, and helped the team win the title. She also won the award of Most Valuable Player of the final game.

== International career ==
Sanchéz was first called to the Venezuela National Team in 2021. She debuted for Venezuela on 19 February 2022 against Latvia in 2022 Turkish Women's Cup, and scored a goal in the same match.

Sanchéz has been a member of Venezuela National Futsal Team. She played in the Futsal World Cup in 2010, 2011, and 2012.

=== International goals ===
No.	Date	Venue	Opponent	Score	Result	Competition
1.	19 February 2022	Goldcity Sport Complex, Alanya, Turkey	Latvia	3–0	3–0	2022 Turkish Women's Cup

== Personal life ==
On 22 December 2025, Sánchez announced her engagement to the journalist Nicole Acuña.
