= Hlushchenko =

Hlushchenko, Glushchenko or Gluschenko (Ukrainian: Глущенко) is a gender-neutral Ukrainian surname that may refer to

- Andriy Hlushchenko (born 1974), Ukrainian footballer
- Anton Hlushchenko (born 2004), Ukrainian footballer
- Dmytro Hlushchenko (born 1981), Ukrainian sprinter
- Fedor Glushchenko (1944–2017), Russian conductor and violinist
- Mykola Hlushchenko (1901–1977), Ukrainian artist
- Tetyana Hlushchenko (born 1956), Ukrainian handball player
- Vitali Glushchenko (born 1985), Russian footballer
