= Ugnė Lazdauskaitė =

Lithuanian footballer

Personal information
- Date of birth: 9 October 2002 (age 24)
- Place of birth: Vilnius, Lithuania
- Height: 1.72 m (5 ft 8 in)
- Position: Forward

Team information
- Current team: MFA Žalgiris-MRU
- Number: 44

Senior career*
Years	Team	Apps	(Gls)
2015	Vilnius FM-JL Stars	3	(0)
2016–2021	MFA Žalgiris Vilnius	122	(106)
2022	Roma Calcio Femminile	15	(6)
2022–2023	FC Sion Feminin	21	(14)
2023–2024	Grasshopper	7	(0)
2024-	MFA Žalgiris-MRU	67	(28)

International career^{‡}
2016	Lithuania U15	3	(0)
2016-2018	Lithuania U17	28	(2)
2019	Lithuania U19	5	(0)
2019–	Lithuania	52	(16)
- * Club domestic league appearances and goals as of 08:50, 16 November 2026 (UTC) ‡ National team caps and goals as of 08:50, 16 November 2026 (UTC)

Ugnė Lazdauskaitė (born 9 October 2002) is a Lithuanian footballer plays as a forward, most recently for MFA Žalgiris-MRU and the Lithuania national team.

== Career ==
=== Vilnius FM-JL Stars ===
Ugnė Lazdauskaitė started her senior career in the Vilnius FM-JL Stars team at age of 12 on 17-05-2015

=== MFA Žalgiris ===
From 2016 was a member of MFA Žalgiris - MRU.

2016: played 13 games for the 1st and reserve team and scored 3 goals.

2017: played 26 games for the 1st and reserve team and scored 5 goals.

2018: played 18 games for the 1st and reserve team and scored 5 goals.

2019: played 11 games for the 1st team and scored 7 goals. Loaned to Kauno Žalgiris for second part of season. Played 7 games and scored 2 goals and became Lithuanian vice-champion for the 1st time.

2020: changed position from midfielder to forward. Played 20 games for the 1st team and scored 28 goals and 14 games for reserve team and scored 35 goals and became Lithuanian vice-champion for the 2nd time.

2021: played 20 games for the 1st team and scored 28 goals and became Lithuanian vice-champion for 3rd time in a row.

After a successful 2021 season received offers from foreign football clubs.

=== Roma Calcio Feminille ===
On 1 February 2022 announced, that player became a member of Roma Calcio Femminile.

Ugnė Lazdauskaitė played 15 games in Femminile Serie B and scored 6 goals and made 1 assist. She became team top scorer.

=== FC Sion Feminin ===
On 27 August 2022 Ugnė Lazdauskaitė joined Swiss club FC Sion Feminin. She played 21 games in Swiss NLB and Swiss Cup and scored 14 goals. U.Lazdauskaitė became team top scorer.

=== Grasshopper Club Zürich ===
On 23 August 2023 announced, that player became a member of Grasshopper Club Zürich. Ugnė Lazdauskaitė has missed most of the 2023–2024 season due to injure (broken feet), received in preseason training. She played 7 matches in Swiss Women's Super League. U.Lazdauskaitė played 4 matches and scored 5 goals for reserve team(U-19).

=== MFA Žalgiris-MRU ===
On 2 August 2024 Ugnė Lazdauskaitė returned to her childhood club - MFA Žalgiris-MRU. She was elected team captain. Team won silver medals in Lithuanian championship.

MFA Žalgiris-MRU won silver medals in BWFL(Baltic Women Football League) and bronze medals in Lithuanian championship in 2025 season. Ugnė Lazdauskaitė became team top scorer.

MFA Žalgiris-MRU won silver medals in BWFL(Baltic Women Football League) and silver medals in Lithuanian championship in 2026 season. Ugnė Lazdauskaitė scored 11 goals and made 14 assists in 22 Lithuanian championship matches.

=== Awards ===
Ugnė Lazdauskaitė was named Lithuanian Footballer of the Year 2022 in January 2023.

Ugnė Lazdauskaitė was named Lithuanian A League Footballer of Year 2026 in November 2026 by PFA Lithuania.

== International career ==
Ugnė Lazdauskaitė played for Lithuania WU-15 3 games and won Baltic Cup in 2016.

Ugnė Lazdauskaitė represented Lithuania at the 2018 UEFA Women's Under-17 Championship. She played 28 games for Lithuania WU-17 and scored 2 goals, won Baltic Cup in 2018.

She played 5 games for Lithuania WU-19 and won Baltic Cup in 2019.

Ugnė Lazdauskaitė has been capped for the Lithuania national team, appearing for the team during UEFA Women's Euro 2022 Qualifications on 8 November 2019. She scored her first international goal against Jordan at the 2021 Armenia International Friendly Tournament on 7 April 2021. Baltic cup winner in 2021.

She played 10 games in FIFA World Cup 2023 Qualifiers for Lithuania NT, scored 3 goals, and became the team's top scorer.

== International goals ==
No.	Date	Venue	Opponent	Score	Result	Competition
1.	7 April 2021	Charentsavan City Stadium, Charentsavan, Armenia	Jordan	1–0	1–0	2021 Armenia Women's International Friendly Tournament
2.	10 April 2021	Pyunik Training Centre, Yerevan, Armenia	Lebanon	5–1	7–1	2021 Armenia Women's International Friendly Tournament
3.	13 June 2021	Alytus Stadium, Alytus, Lithuania	Faroe Islands	2–0	2–0	2021 Baltic Women's Cup
4.	12 April 2022	LFF Stadium, Vilnius, Lithuania	Moldova	4–0	4–0	2023 FIFA Women's World Cup qualification
5.	28 June 2022	Zimbru Stadium, Chișinău, Moldova	Moldova	1–0	1–1	2023 FIFA Women's World Cup qualification
6.	2 September 2022	LFF Stadium, Vilnius, Lithuania	Romania	1–7	1–7	2023 FIFA Women's World Cup qualification
7.	9 October 2022	Võru Sports Center Stadium, Võru, Estonia	Latvia	1–0	2–1	2022 Baltic Women's Cup
8.	9 October 2022	Võru Sports Center Stadium, Võru, Estonia	Latvia	2–0	2–1	2022 Baltic Women's Cup
9.	13 November 2022	Stade Municipal, Rumelange, Luxembourg	Luxembourg	1–0	3–2	Friendly
10.	13 November 2022	Stade Municipal, Rumelange, Luxembourg	Luxembourg	2–0	3–2	Friendly
11.	10 April 2023	Nacionālā bāze "Boyana", Sofia, Bulgaria	Latvia	1–0	2–1	International Women's Cup Sofia 2023
12.	6 April 2024	Mikheil Meskhi Stadium, Tbilisi, Georgia	Georgia	1–2	2–2	UEFA Women's Euro 2025 qualifying
13.	30 May 2025	Bayil Arena, Baku, Azerbaijan	Azerbaijan	4–0	5–0	2025 UEFA Women's Nations League
14.	29 November 2025	Sportland Arena, Tallinn, Estonia	Estonia	2–0	2–0	Friendly
15.	3 March 2026	Rheinpark Stadion, Vaduz, Liechtenstein	Liechtenstein	2–1	6–1	2027 FIFA Women's World Cup qualification
16.	9 June 2026	LSC Druskininkai Stadium, Druskininkai, Lithuania	Liechtenstein	1–0	2–0	2027 FIFA Women's World Cup qualification
