= Greta Lukjančukė =

Lithuanian footballer

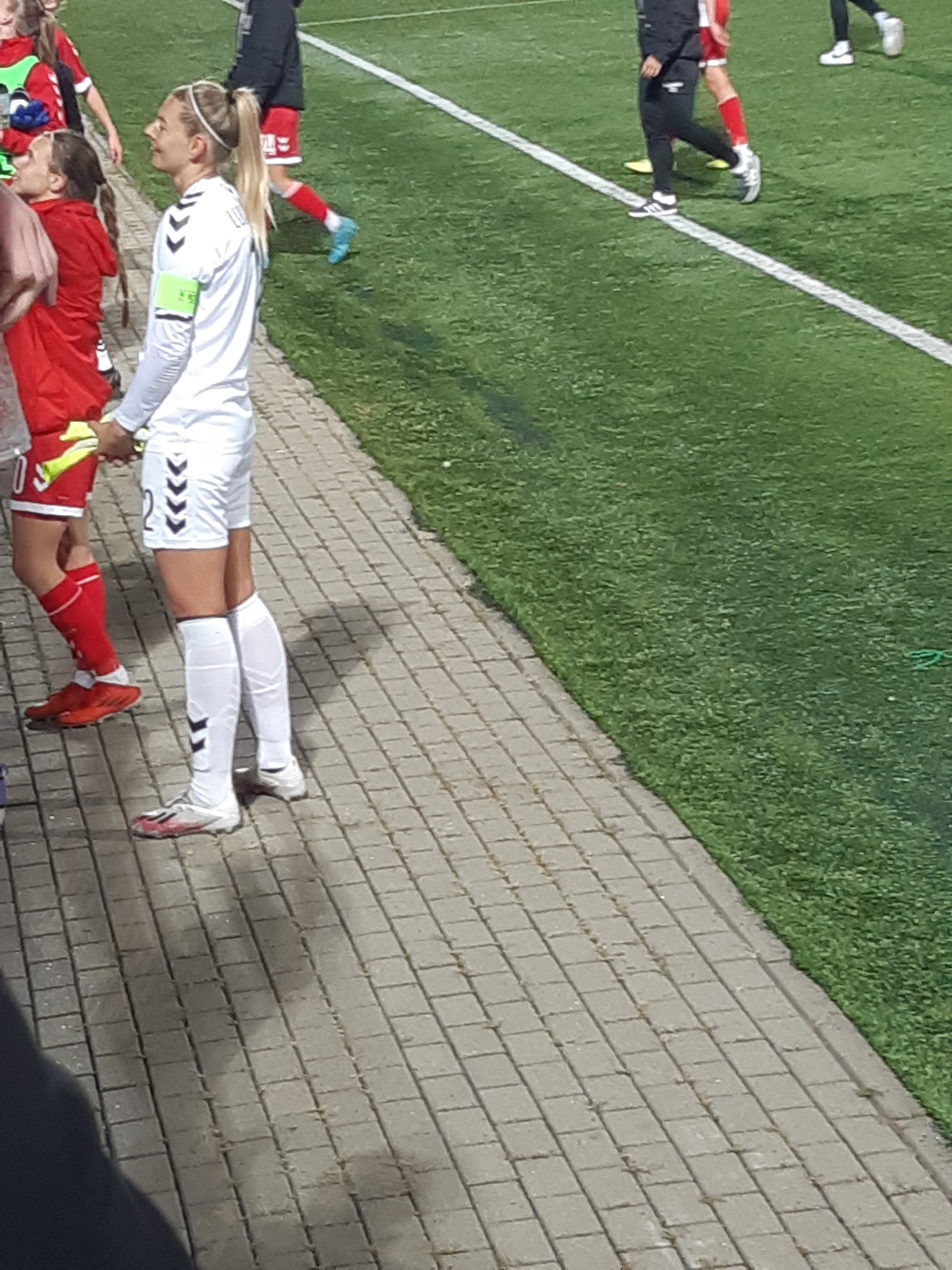

Personal information
- Birth name: Greta Kaselytė
- Date of birth: 10 September 1992 (age 34)
- Place of birth: Ukmergė, Lithuania
- Height: 1.81 m (5 ft 11 in)
- Position: Goalkeeper

Team information
- Current team: FA Šiauliai
- Number: 77

Senior career*
Years	Team	Apps	(Gls)
2010–	Gintra Universitetas		

International career^{‡}
- Lithuania
- * Club domestic league appearances and goals as of 13:29, 30 August 2019 (UTC) ‡ National team caps and goals as of 13:29, 30 August 2019 (UTC)

Greta Lukjančukė (née Kaselytė; born 10 September 1992) is a Lithuanian footballer who plays as a goalkeeper and has appeared for the Lithuania women's national team.

== Career ==
Lukjančukė has been capped for the Lithuania national team, appearing for the team during the 2019 FIFA Women's World Cup qualifying cycle.
