= List of Armenia women's international footballers =

This is a list of Armenia women's international footballers who have played for the Armenia women's national football team.

== Players ==
Name	Caps	Goals	National team years	Club(s)
Kristine Aleksanyan	22	2	2006–2012	–
Teveen Aghababian	8	0	2019–2022	(Armenia) Pyunik FC
Gohar Armenyan	2	1	2012	–
Maral Artin	2	1	2020–	(Armenia) Alashkert
Arpine Arzumanyan	11	0	2010–2012	–
Paytsar Asatryan	2	0	2020–	(Armenia) Alashkert
Nancy Avesyan	2	0	2020–	Unattached
Emma Baboyan	1	0	2020–	(Armenia) Shirak-Homenmen
Anna Dallakyan	2	0	2020–	(Armenia) Gyumri
Eleonora Davtyan	–	–	–	–
Nyree Der-Megerdichian	1	0	2020–	(United States) Los Angeles Surf
Tatyana Dolmatova	2	0	2020–	(Armenia) Shirak-Homenmen
Hripsime Epremyan	–	–	–	–
Ksenia Garanina	1	0	2020–	(Armenia) Shirak-Homenmen
Liana Ghazaryan	1	0	2020–	(Armenia) Gyumri
Luiza Ghazaryan	2	0	2020–	(Armenia) Alashkert
Ani Ghukasyan	23	1	2007–	(Armenia) Alashkert
Liana Grigoryan	3	0	2006	Retired
Kristine Hakobyan	9	0	2009–2012	–
Areni Hamparian	2	0	2020–	Unknown
Liana Hayrapetyan	1	0	2006	Retired
Lusine Hovhannisyan	8	0	2006–2009	–
Ani Karapetyan	2	0	2020–	(Armenia) Alashkert
Anna Karapetyan	22	0	2006–2012	–
Lilit Karapetyan	18	0	2009–2012	–
Marine Karapetyan	22	0	2007–	(Armenia) Alashkert
Armine Khachatryan	19	0	2006–2012	(Armenia) Alashkert
Melsida Khachatryan	1	0	2007	–
Vardine Khanzatyan	16	0	2007–2011	–
Anastasia Klimova	2	0	2020–	(Russia) Yenisey
Gayane Kostanyan	19	1	2006–2012	–
Kristine Mangasaryan	18	2	2007–2012	–
Tatevik Manukyan	2	0	2010–2012	–
Anna Mkrtchyan	1	0	2006	–
Karine Nazlukhanyan	2	0	2007	–
Anni Nersisyan	1	0	2007	(Armenia) Alashkert
Olga Osipyan	10	0	2011–	(Ukraine) Voskhod Stara Mayachka
Anna Petrosyan	1	0	2007	–
Vera Petrosyan	1	0	2007	–
Oksanna Pizlova	2	0	2020–	(Armenia) Alashkert
Maria Sakhinova	2	0	2020–	(Armenia) Alashkert
Susanna Sayadyan	8	0	2006–2009	–
Sona Shahinyan	5	0	2009–2010	–
Mariam Stepanyan	2	0	2007	Retired
Nelli Stepanyan	2	0	2006–2007	–
Armine Tadevosyan	2	0	2006–2007	–
Mariam Torgomyan	13	0	2007–2012	–
Nora Yeghyan	2	0	2020–	(Armenia) Alashkert
Hasmik Yeremyan	8	0	2010–2012	–

== See also ==
- Armenia women's national football team
