= Sara Lamhauge =

Faroese footballer

Personal information
- Full name: Sara Samson Lamhauge
- Date of birth: 19 December 2000 (age 25)
- Place of birth: Faroe Islands,
- Position: Midfielder

Team information
- Current team: NSÍ

Senior career*
Years	Team	Apps	(Gls)
2016-2022	HB	84	(12)
2023-	NSÍ	16	(6)

International career^{‡}
- Faroe Islands
- * Club domestic league appearances and goals as of 20:10, 4 May 2020 (UTC) ‡ National team caps and goals as of 19:38, 30 August 2019 (UTC)

Sara Lamhauge (born 19 December 2000) is a Faroese footballer who plays as a midfielder and has appeared for the Faroe Islands women's national team.

== Career ==
Lamhauge has been capped for the Faroe Islands national team, appearing for the team during the 2019 FIFA Women's World Cup qualifying cycle.
