= Vitali Glushchenko (footballer) =

Russian footballer

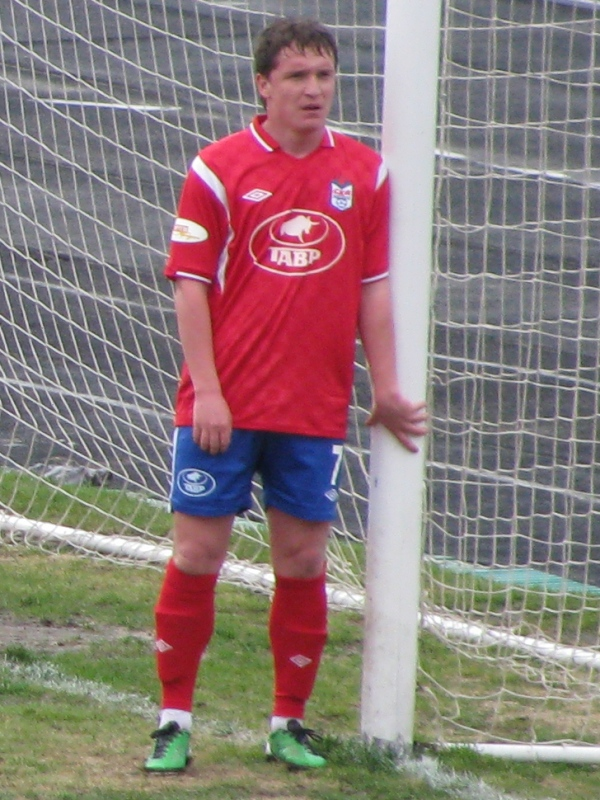

Personal information
- Full name: Vitali Aleksandrovich Glushchenko
- Date of birth: 17 March 1985 (age 41)
- Height: 1.68 m (5 ft 6 in)
- Position: Midfielder

Senior career*
Years	Team	Apps	(Gls)
2002–2003	FC Lada Togliatti	35	(0)
2004	FC Chernomorets Novorossiysk	30	(1)
2005	FC Chernomorets Novorossiysk (amateur)		
2006	FC Chernomorets Novorossiysk	16	(1)
2007	FC Nika Krasny Sulin (amateur)		
2008–2009	FC Gazovik Orenburg	49	(4)
2010	FC Dynamo Stavropol	30	(1)
2011–2012	FC SKA Rostov-on-Don	29	(1)
- * Club domestic league appearances and goals

Vitali Aleksandrovich Glushchenko (Russian: Виталий Александрович Глущенко; born 17 March 1985) is a former Russian professional football player.

== Club career ==
He played two seasons in the Russian Football National League for FC Lada Togliatti and FC Chernomorets Novorossiysk .
