= Central Stadium of Jonava =

Football stadium in Jonava, Lithuania

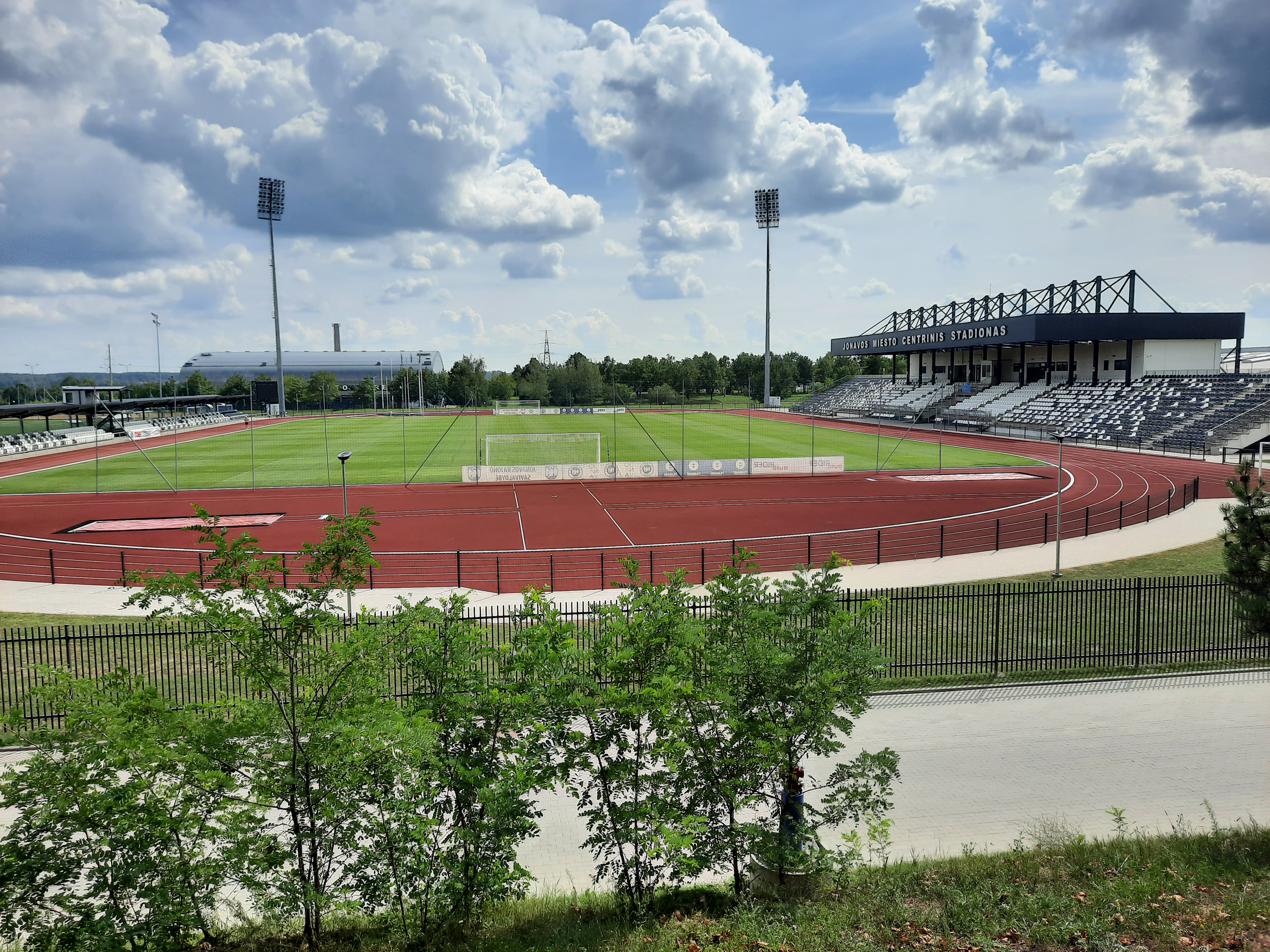
- UEFA Category 2 stadium

- Location within Jonava
- Full name: Jonavos rajono savivaldybės kūno kultūros ir sporto centro centrinis stadionas
- Address: Žeimių g. 17
- Location: Jonava, Lithuania
- Coordinates: 55°04′41″N 24°16′17″E
- Owner: Jonava city municipality
- Operator: Physical culture and sports center of Jonava
- Capacity: 2,580 (main stadium); 520 (artificial pitch)
- Surface: Grass
- Acreage: 13,970 m^{2}

Construction
- Renovated: 2010, 2017–23
- Expanded: 2017, 2021, 2023

Tenants
- FK Jonava; FK Jonava B FK Be1 (2024–present)

Central Stadium of Jonava is a multi-purpose stadium in Jonava, Lithuania. It currently has a capacity for 2,580 spectators.

== History ==
The stadium underwent a phased reconstruction process. In 2017, a modular, movable grandstand was installed on the eastern perimeter, designed to serve either the main stadium, or the adjacent artificial pitch, with a flexible configuration allowing mixed in-between utilization between the two.

Following this, construction on the main stand commenced on the West edge in 2017 and concluded in 2021 with the inauguration of the new Main stand, boasting over 2,000 seating capacity, marking the stadium's official reopening. Subsequently, in the same year, a second reconstruction of the opposing Eastern stand commenced, to erect a permanent tribune. A total of additional 1,136 bucket seats were added, replacing the modular structure and again distributed between the pitches.

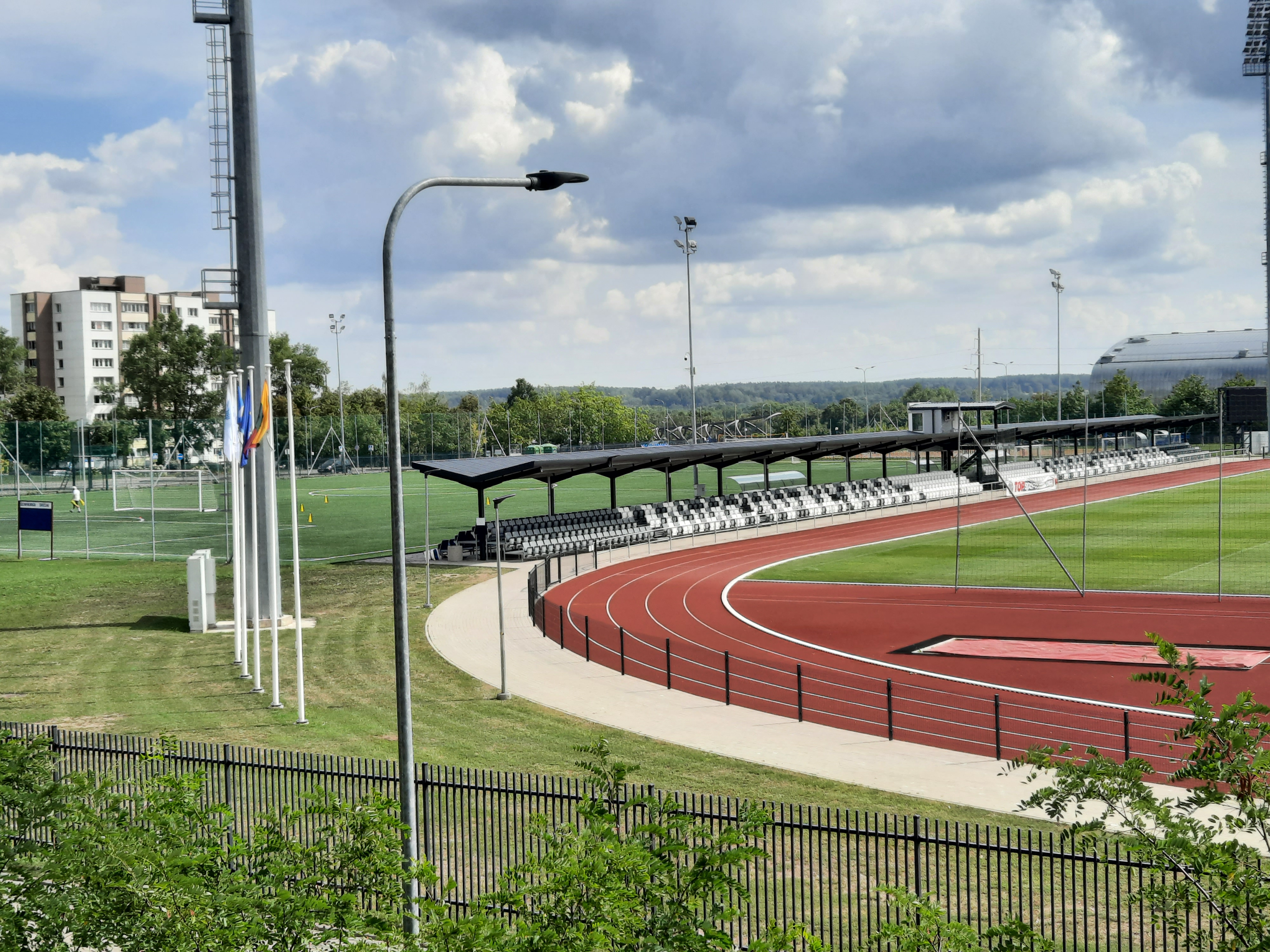
Eastern stand and the artificial pitch stadium

Upon completion of the construction works, the main stadium now holds a seating capacity of 2,580, while the adjacent synthetic pitch accommodating 520 spectators.

== Events ==
The stadium hosts football matches, regional athletics events, strength sports, etc. It also can host outdoor basketball and volleyball championships. The stadium also has hosted some cultural events. Near the stadium is an outdoor pond, which can be used for water events.

== Equipment ==
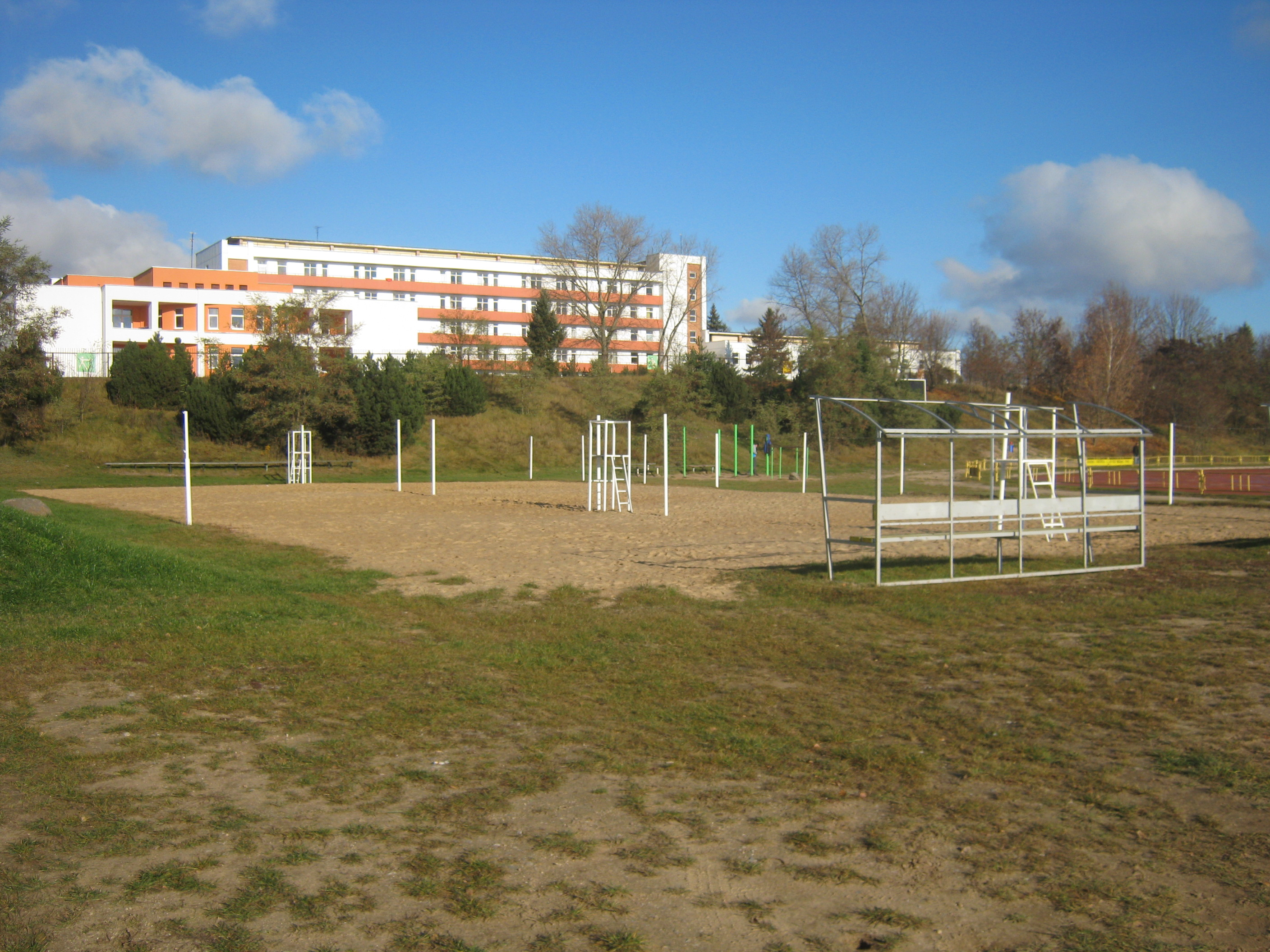
Beach volleyball courts

- 2 grass fields (mostly using for football)
- Running tracks
- 6 street basketball squads
- Rugby and volleyball equipment
- Beach volleyball squad
- Screen and lighting

== See also ==
- Jonava Arena
