= Armenia women's national football team =

Armenia
- Nickname: Ararat
- Association: Football Federation of Armenia
- Confederation: UEFA (Europe)
- Head coach: Mariam Stepanyan
- Captain: Maral Artin
- Home stadium: Vazgen Sargsyan Republican Stadium
- FIFA code: ARM
First colours	Second colours

FIFA ranking
- Current: 147 ▲2 (16 June 2026)
- Highest: 83 (October 2003)
- Lowest: 148 (December 2023)

First international
- Austria 11–0 Armenia (Waidhofen, Austria; 10 May 2003)

Biggest win
- Armenia 6–1 Liechtenstein (Armavir, Armenia; 21 February 2025)

Biggest defeat
- Belgium 19–0 Armenia (Leuven, Belgium; 25 November 2021)

The Armenia women's national football team (Armenian: Հայաստանի ֆուտբոլի ազգային հավաքական) is the national football team of Armenia and is controlled by the Football Federation of Armenia. The team played its first international match after the split of the Soviet Union. They play their home games at the Mika Stadium in Yerevan. The team's first match was on 10 May 2003 against Austria which they lost 11–0. The team has not qualified for a World Cup or a Women's Euro yet.

== History ==
Armenia played its first match in Waidhofen against Austria, losing 11–0. Three days later they again lost 11–0 against Austria. After these two matches, they played four matches against Slovakia and Greece.

Armenia withdrew from the 2007 World Cup qualification before playing any matches. Later, they played international friendlies in 2007–2009; playing the World Cup qualifiers in November 2009 – August 2010, finishing last with only a goal, 42 conceded and all eight matches lost. Their last competition was the 2013 Women's Euro qualifiers. They Did not enter the 2015 or 2019 FIFA Women's World Cup qualification.

Armenia entered the qualification for 2023 FIFA Women's World Cup. In Group F they thrice managed to lose by just 1 goal margin, but also suffered their heaviest loss ever, with a score of 19–0, to Belgium.

=== Home stadium ===
Armenia plays their home matches at the Vazgen Sargsyan Republican Stadium.

== Results and fixtures ==
- The following is a list of match results in the last 12 months, as well as any future matches that have been scheduled.

Legend

Win Draw Lose Fixture

=== 2026 ===
7 October Friendly	Jordan	1–2	Armenia	Aqaba, Jordan
18:00 UTC+3	Jbarah 90+1'	Report	Dallakyan 45+1'; Artin 54'	Stadium: Al-Aqaba Stadium, Aqaba

10 October Friendly	Indonesia	0–0	Armenia	Aqaba, Jordan
18:00 UTC+3				Stadium: Al-Aqaba Stadium, Aqaba

== Coaching staff ==
=== Current coaching staff ===
As of September 2023

Position	Name
Head coach	Mariam Stepanyan
Assistant coaches	Armen Bareghamyan
Assistant coaches	Narek Azatyan
Assistant coaches	Vagharshak Shahnazaryan

=== Manager history ===
Name	Period	Matches	Wins	Draws	Losses	Winning %	Notes
Mher Mikaelyan	2003–2007	0	0	0	0	00.0%	
Samvel Adamyan	2008–2010	0	0	0	0	00.0%	
Vagharshak Aslanyan	2010–2012	0	0	0	0	00.0%	
Manuk Sargsyan	2020–2021	0	0	0	0	00.0%	
Armen Sanamyan	2021–2022	0	0	0	0	00.0%	
Artak Adamyan	2022–2026	0	0	0	0	00.0%	
Mariam Stepanyan	2026–						

== Players ==
=== Current squad ===
- The following players were named for the friendly matches against Jordan and Indonesia on October 6 and 10, 2026.

Caps and goals accurate up to and including 7 October 2026.

No.	Pos.	Player	Date of birth (age)	Caps	Goals	Club
16	GK	Shogher Sardaryan	1 May 2007 (age 19)	0	0	(Football Federation of Armenia) Urartu Girls
1	GK	Alina Poghosyan	21 September 2003 (age 23)	0	0	(Football Federation of Armenia) Ampula FC
2	DF	Svetlana Karazgezian	7 October 2004 (age 22)	5	1	(Russian Football Union) Rostov Women
5	DF	Liana Ghazaryan	15 February 2000 (age 26)	15	0	(Russian Football Union) Rostov Women
	DF	Ani Karapetyan	30 May 2001 (age 25)	10	0	(Football Federation of Armenia) Pyunik Girls
9	DF	Oksanna Pizlova	14 November 2000 (age 25)	11	1	(Russian Football Union) Rostov Women
	DF	Anyuta Galstyan	7 April 2001 (age 25)	10	0	(Football Federation of Armenia) Urartu Girls
	DF	Norah Zadehyan	1 January 2010 (age 16)	0	0	(United States Soccer Federation) Legends FC San Diego
	DF	Arianna Dominguez	1 January 2003 (age 23)	0	0	(United States Soccer Federation) LA Breakers
	MF	Tahlia Voskanian	12 April 2006 (age 20)	4	0	(Football Australia) North West Sydney Spirit FC
11	MF	Veronika Asatryan	9 June 2002 (age 24)	10	1	(Football Federation of Armenia) Pyunik Girls
14	MF	Armine Vardanyan	6 October 2007 (age 19)	0	0	(Football Federation of Armenia) Noah Girls
8	MF	Lara Kazandjian	27 September 2002 (age 24)	6	3	(Royal Spanish Football Federation) Zaragoza
7	MF	Anna Dallakyan	30 August 2001 (age 25)	16	2	(Russian Football Union) Ryazan-VDV
10	MF	Maral Artin (Captain)	9 June 2000 (age 26)	20	5	(Saudi Arabian Football Federation) Al-Hmmah Club
14	MF	Ani Jensen	10 April 2002 (age 24)	0	0	(Mexican Football Federation) Club Necaxa
14	MF	Emmy Sargsyan	2 May 2005 (age 21)	0	0	(Football Federation of Armenia) Urartu Girls
19	MF	Milena Sayadyan	22 September 2006 (age 20)	2	0	(Football Federation of Armenia) Urartu Girls
	MF	Elena Martirosyan	6 February 2007 (age 19)	2	0	(Football Federation of Armenia) Urartu Girls
15	FW	Lusine Kostanyan	11 June 2005 (age 21)	4	0	(Football Federation of Armenia) Urartu Girls
	FW	Susanna Badalyan	13 April 2003 (age 23)	0	0	(Football Federation of Armenia) Pyunik Girls
13	FW	Tatev Khachatryan	3 May 2007 (age 19)	3	0	(Football Federation of Armenia) Urartu Girls
13	FW	Ruzanna Injyan	6 March 2007 (age 19)	0	0	(Football Federation of Armenia) Urartu Girls

=== Recent call-ups ===
The following players have been called up to the squad in the past 12 months.

Pos.	Player	Date of birth (age)	Caps	Goals	Club	Latest call-up
GK	Lilit Babayan	2 March 2007 (age 19)	0	0	(Armenia) FC Pyunik	October 2026
GK	Violeta Musakhanyan		0	0	(Armenia) Urartu-Girls	October 2026

== Records ==
*Active players in bold, statistics correct as of 30 July 2021.

=== Most capped players ===
#	Player	Year(s)	Caps

=== Top goalscorers ===
#	Player	Year(s)	Goals	Caps

== Competitive record ==
=== FIFA Women's World Cup ===
FIFA Women's World Cup record									Qualification record						
Year	Result	Pld	W	D*	L	GF	GA	GD	Pld	W	D*	L	GF	GA	GD
(China) 1991	Part of Soviet Union								Part of Soviet Union						
(Sweden) 1995	Did not enter								UEFA Euro 1995						
(United States) 1999	Did not enter								Did not enter						
(United States) 2003	Did not enter								Did not enter						
(China) 2007	Did not enter								Did not enter						
(Germany) 2011	Did not qualify								8	0	0	8	1	42	−41
(Canada) 2015	Did not enter								Did not enter						
(France) 2019	Did not enter								Did not enter						
(Australia) (New Zealand) 2023	Did not qualify								10	0	0	10	1	71	−70
(Brazil) 2027	Did not qualify								4	0	1	3	1	13	−12
(Costa Rica) (Jamaica) (Mexico) (United States) 2031	To be determined								To be determined						
(United Kingdom) 2035	To be determined								To be determined						
Total	–	–	–	–	–	–	–	–	22	0	1	21	3	126	−123

*Draws include knockout matches decided on penalty kicks.

=== UEFA Women's Championship ===
UEFA Women's Championship record								Qualifying record							
Year	Result	Pld	W	D*	L	GF	GA	Pld	W	D*	L	GF	GA	P/R	Rnk
1984 to (Denmark) 1991	Part of Soviet Union							Part of Soviet Union							
(Italy) 1993 to (Germany) 2001	Did not enter							Did not enter							
(England) 2005	Did not qualify							6	0	0	6	0	53	–	
(Finland) 2009	Did not qualify							3	1	1	1	2	2	–	
(Sweden) 2013	Did not qualify							11	1	2	8	4	45	–	
(Netherlands) 2017	Did not enter							Did not enter							
(England) 2022	Did not enter							Did not enter							
(Switzerland) 2025	Did not qualify							6	2	0	4	8	18	(Note: From Euro 2025 onwards a new qualifying format was introduced, linked to the Women's Nations League where teams are divided into leagues with promotion/relegation between the leagues at the end of each cycle.)	44th
2029	To be determined							To be determined							
Total	–	–	–	–	–	–	–	26	4	3	19	14	118	44th	

*Draws include knockout matches decided on penalty kicks.

=== UEFA Women's Nations League ===
UEFA Women's Nations League record
Year	League	Group	Pos	Pld	W	D	L	GF	GA	P/R	Rnk
2023–24	C	4	4th	6	0	0	6	5	25	Same position	51st
2025	C	3	3rd	6	2	1	3	13	11	Same position	46th
Total				12	2	1	9	18	36	51st and 46th	

▲	Promoted at end of season
Same position	No movement at end of season
▼	Relegated at end of season
*	Participated in promotion/relegation play-offs

=== Other tournaments ===
Tournament	Result
2021 Armenia Friendly Tournament	**Second place**

== See also ==
- Sport in Armenia
  - Football in Armenia
    - Women's football in Armenia
- Armenia women's national football team
  - Armenia women's national football team results
  - List of Armenia women's international footballers
- Armenia men's national football team
