= Lithuania women's national football team =

Women's national association football team representing Lithuania

Lithuania
- Association: Lithuanian Football Federation (Lietuvos futbolo federacija – LFF)
- Confederation: UEFA (Europe)
- Head coach: Tomas Ražanauskas
- Captain: Milda Liužinaitė
- Most caps: Algimantė Mikutaitė (73)
- Top scorer: Rimantė Jonušaitė (18)
- FIFA code: LTU
| First colours | Second colours |

FIFA ranking
- Current: 94 (20 October 2026)
- Highest: 60 (December 2004 – March 2005; December 2005 – September 2006)
- Lowest: 108 (April 2021)

First international
- Lithuania 0–11 Denmark (Kaunas, Lithuania; 15 August 1993)

Biggest win
- Lithuania 6–0 Latvia (Šiauliai, Lithuania; 25 May 2007); Lithuania 7–1 Lebanon (Yerevan, Armenia; 10 April 2021)

Biggest defeat
- Scotland 17–0 Lithuania (Glasgow, Scotland, 31 May 1998)

The Lithuania women's national football team (Lithuanian: Lietuvos nacionalinė moterų futbolo komanda) represents Lithuania in international women's football and is controlled by the Lithuanian Football Federation, the governing body for football in Lithuania.

The Lithuania women's national football team played their first official international match in 1993. In 1940, Lithuania was occupied by the Soviet Union, halting independent sports participation; after the country regained its independence in 1990, the women's national team was formed under the re-established Lithuanian Football Federation and played their inaugural match on 15 August 1993 against Denmark in Kaunas.

Although Lithuania has never qualified for the FIFA Women's World Cup nor the UEFA Women's Championship, they actively compete in the regional Women's Baltic Cup tournament, which takes place regularly between Lithuania and their Baltic rivals, Latvia and Estonia (alongside invited nations such as the Faroe Islands). Lithuania has won the Women's Baltic Cup 5 times (1996, 1998, 2007, 2015, and 2021), trailing Estonia (12 titles) and Latvia (6 titles) in overall victories.

While the team frequently uses stadiums across the country, including Savivaldybė Stadium in Šiauliai and LFF Stadium in Vilnius, they have also played major international fixtures at the modernized Darius and Girėnas Stadium in Kaunas following its reopening in 2022.

== History ==
The Lithuania women's national football team played their first official international match on 15 August 1993 in Kaunas, resulting in an 11–0 loss against Denmark. Following the restoration of Lithuania's independence in 1990, the team was organized under the re-established Lithuanian Football Federation (LFF) to represent the nation in women's international football. During their early years, Lithuania regularly competed against their Baltic neighbours, Estonia and Latvia, picking up their first official international victory in a 1–0 win over Latvia on 15 August 1996 during the Women's Baltic Cup.

Lithuania won their inaugural Women's Baltic Cup title in 1996 and went on to capture the regional championship again in 1998, 2007, 2015, and 2021.

In official European qualifying competitions, Lithuania entered the UEFA Women's Euro qualifications for the first time during the UEFA Women's Euro 1997 campaign., Throughout the 2000s and 2010s, they maintained a regular presence in preliminary qualification rounds for major tournaments, including hosting the 2019 FIFA Women's World Cup preliminary round group in April 2017 where they picked up a victory against Andorra.

In April 2021, during the Armenia Women's International Friendly Tournament, Lithuania achieved a significant victory by defeating Lebanon 7-1. This win set a new national record for goals scored in a single match and matched their largest winning margin.

More recently, Lithuania earned a competitive result during the UEFA Women's Euro 2025 qualifying phase in April 2024, securing a 2–2 draw against Georgia in Tbilisi.

== Results and fixtures ==
The following is a list of match results in the last 12 months, as well as any future matches that have been scheduled.

Legend

Win Draw Loss Fixture

=== 2025 ===
| 29 November Friendly | Estonia | 0–2 | Lithuania | Tallinn, Estonia |
| 15:30 | | Report | 14' Jonušaitė; 77' Lazdauskaitė | Stadium: Sportland Arena; Referee: Jelena Jermolajeva |

=== 2026 ===
| 3 March 2027 FIFA Women's World Cup qualification | Liechtenstein | 1–6 | Lithuania | Vaduz, Liechtenstein |
| | Risch 30' | Report | Jonušaitė 3', 64', 77', 83'; Lazdauskaitė 43'; Petrauskaitė 90+1' | Stadium: Rheinpark Stadion; Attendance: 604; Referee: Teresa Oliveira (Portugal) |

| 7 March 2027 FIFA Women's World Cup qualification | Lithuania | 0–0 | Estonia | Raudondvaris, Lithuania |
| 16:00 | | Report | | Stadium: Raudondvario stadionas Attendance: 587; Referee: Marina Živković (Serbia) |

| 14 April 2027 FIFA Women's World Cup qualification | Lithuania | 2–0 | Bosnia and Herzegovina | Druskininkai, Lithuania |
| | 62', 73' Rimantė Jonušaitė | Report | | Stadium: LSC sporto kompleksas „Druskininkai“ Referee: Audrey Gerbel (France) |

| 18 April 2027 FIFA Women's World Cup qualification | Estonia | 2–1 | Lithuania | Tallinn, Estonia |
| 16:00 | Lillemäe 42'; Tammik 90+3' | Report | Švarcaitė 30' | Stadium: Lilleküla Stadium; Attendance: 487; Referee: Asen Albayrak (Turkey) |

| 5 June 2027 FIFA Women's World Cup qualification | Bosnia and Herzegovina | 0–0 | Lithuania | Zenica, Bosnia and Herzgovina |
| 17:00 | | Report (FIFA); Report (UEFA) | | Stadium: FF BH Football Training Centre; Referee: Minka Vekkeli (Finland) |

| 9 June 2027 FIFA Women's World Cup qualification | Lithuania | 2–0 | Liechtenstein | Druskininkai, Lithuania |
| 19:00 (20:00 UTC+3) | Lazdauskaitė 7'; Vaitukaitytė 50' | Report (FIFA); Report (UEFA) | | Stadium: LSC Druskininkai Stadium; Referee: Lena Hirtl (Austria) |

| 9 October 2027 FIFA Women's World Cup play-offs | Lithuania | 0–5 | Sweden | Kaunas, Lithuania |
| 19:05 (20:05 UTC+3) | | Report (FIFA); Report (UEFA) | Schröder 23' (pen.), 57', 62'; Blackstenius 75'; Ilestedt 82' | Stadium: Darius and Girėnas Stadium; Referee: Deborah Anex (Switzerland) |

| 13 October 2027 FIFA Women's World Cup play-offs | Sweden | 10–0 | Lithuania | Stockholm, Sweden |
| 19:00 | Björn 11'; Blackstenius 16', 52'; Holmberg 25'; Lundkvist 30'; Schröder 36', 45+1'; Ilestedt 60', 81'; Šeškutė 69' (o.g.) | Report (FIFA); Report (UEFA) | | Stadium: Nationalarenan; Referee: Lotta Vuorio (Finland) |

== Coaching staff ==
=== Current coaching staff ===
| Position | Name | Nationality | Period / Notes | Ref. |
|---|---|---|---|---|
| Head coach | Tomas Ražanauskas | 🇱🇹 Lithuanian (Lithuania) | Appointed on 13 January 2025 | |
| Assistant coach | Tatjana Veržbickaja | 🇱🇹 Lithuanian (Lithuania) | Appointed on 13 January 2025 | |

=== Manager history ===
Jurijus Sarapas (1993): The Inaugural Head Coach Led the newly formed team in their official debut match against Denmark on 15 August 1993, in Kaunas, establishing the national program following independence.

Vygandas Lekas (1996): Managed the squad during the 1996 Women's Baltic Cup campaign, guiding Lithuania to their first official regional title.

Aleksandras Fondis (1997): Appointed to direct the team as Lithuania entered official UEFA qualification campaigns (UEFA Women's Euro 1997 qualifying cycle).

Rimantas Viktoravičius (2003–2021):Held the position for nearly 19 consecutive years. He oversaw Lithuania's national team development while simultaneously coaching domestic powerhouse FC Gintra, leading Lithuania through multiple Baltic Cup victories (2007, 2015).

Daniel Wimmer (16 February 2022 – 13 January 2025): The German tactician debuted on February 16, 2022, focusing on professionalizing squad development and navigating the team through UEFA Women's Nations League and Euro qualifying cycles.

Tomas Ražanauskas(13 January 2025 – Present): Appointed on 13 January 2025, to lead the team through World Cup and European qualification campaigns.

== Players ==
=== Current squad ===
- The following players were named for the friendly match against Estonia in Viimsi, Estonia, on 29 November 2025.
- Caps and goals correct up to and including 29 November 2025.

| No. | Pos. | Player | Date of birth (age) | Caps | Goals | Club |
|---|---|---|---|---|---|---|
| | GK | Greta Lukjančukė | 10 September 1992 (age 34) | 0 | 0 | (Lithuanian Football Federation) FK Gintra |
| | GK | Meda Šeškutė | 1 August 2003 (age 23) | 31 | 0 | (Lithuanian Football Federation) MFA Žalgiris |
| | DF | Austė Bernotaitė | 26 July 2003 (age 23) | 11 | 0 | (Lithuanian Football Federation) FK Banga |
| | DF | Athena Diachenko | 28 November 2003 (age 22) | 0 | 0 | (The Football Association) Actonians WFC |
| | DF | Laura Kubiliūtė | 2 February 2002 (age 24) | | | (Lithuanian Football Federation) FK Gintra |
| | DF | Milda Liužinaitė (Captain) | 17 August 1995 (age 31) | 66 | 5 | (Lithuanian Football Federation) FC Hegelmann |
| | DF | Tereza Romanovskaja | 17 May 2003 (age 23) | 22 | 1 | (Lithuanian Football Federation) FK Gintra |
| | DF | Loreta Rogačiova | 19 March 2001 (age 25) | 48 | 0 | (Polish Football Association) Polonia Środa Wielkopolska |
| | DF | Greta Valikonienė | 31 January 1997 (age 29) | 16 | 0 | (Lithuanian Football Federation) FK TransINVEST |
| | DF | Lolita Žižytė | 27 July 1998 (age 28) | 32 | 1 | (Italian Football Federation) Freedom FC |
| | MF | Justina Blaževičiūtė | 18 October 1998 (age 28) | 4 | 0 | (Lithuanian Football Federation) FK Gintra |
| | MF | Marija Galkina | 12 September 2002 (age 24) | 27 | 2 | (German Football Association) St. Pauli |
| | MF | Emilija Giržutaitė | 12 December 2002 (age 23) | | | (Polish Football Association) Polonia Środa Wielkopolska |
| | MF | Monika Grikšaitė | 28 November 2002 (age 23) | 22 | 2 | (Lithuanian Football Federation) FK Banga |
| | MF | Ema Kriaučiūnaitė | 10 August 2004 (age 22) | 5 | 0 | (Lithuanian Football Federation) FC Hegelmann |
| | MF | Ugnė Lazdauskaitė | 9 October 2002 (age 24) | 39 | 12 | (Italian Football Federation) Como |
| | MF | Algimantė Mikutaitė | 7 December 1996 (age 29) | 69 | 1 | (Lithuanian Football Federation) FK Gintra |
| | MF | Viltė Švarcaitė | 25 April 2000 (age 26) | 2 | 0 | (Lithuanian Football Federation) FK Banga |
| | MF | Liucija Vaitukaitytė | 24 April 2000 (age 26) | 56 | 8 | (Royal Belgian Football Association) RSC Anderlecht |
| | FW | Rimantė Jonušaitė | 25 October 2003 (age 23) | 37 | 12 | (Italian Football Federation) AC Milan |
| | FW | Kamilė Vaičiulaitytė | 18 August 1994 (age 32) | | | (Lithuanian Football Federation) FK TransINVEST |

=== Recent call ups ===
- The following players have been called up to a Lithuania squad in the past 12 months.

| Pos. | Player | Date of birth (age) | Caps | Goals | Club | Latest call-up |
|---|---|---|---|---|---|---|
| GK | Aušrinė Bikutė | 22 July 2003 (age 23) | 0 | 0 | (Lithuania) FK Gintra | v. Latvia,27 October 2025 |
| GK | Karolina Curukova | 24 July 2005 (age 21) | | | (Lithuania) MFA Žalgiris-MRU | v. Latvia,27 October 2025 |
| DF | Augustė Andrijevskytė | 28 November 2002 (age 23) | | | (Lithuania) MFA Žalgiris-MRU | v. Latvia,27 October 2025 |
| DF | Karolina Jasaitytė | 10 October 2000 (age 26) | | | (Lithuania) FC Utenos Utenis | v. Latvia,27 October 2025 |
| DF | Vestina Neverdauskaitė | 19 September 1993 (age 33) | 46 | 0 | (Lithuania) FK Saned | v. Latvia,27 October 2025 |
| MF | Žemyna Lekavičiūtė | 28 November 2000 (age 25) | | | (Romania) | v. Latvia,27 October 2025 |
| FW | Erika Šupelytė | 28 July 2003 (age 23) | 7 | 0 | (Lithuania) MFA Žalgiris | v. Latvia,27 October 2025 |

== Records ==
- Active players in **bold**, statistics correct as of April 2026.

=== Most capped players ===
| # | Player | Year(s) | Caps |

=== Top goalscorers ===
| # | Player | Year(s) | Goals | Caps |

== Competitive record ==
=== FIFA Women's World Cup ===
| FIFA Women's World Cup record | | | | | | | | | Qualification record | | | | | | |
| Year | Result | Pld | W | D* | L | GF | GA | GD | Pld | W | D* | L | GF | GA | GD |
| (China) 1991 | Did not exist | | | | | | | | Did not exist | | | | | | |
| (Sweden) 1995 | Did not qualify | | | | | | | | UEFA Euro 1995 | | | | | | |
| (United States) 1999 | Did not qualify | | | | | | | | 6 | 1 | 0 | 5 | 3 | 48 | −45 |
| (United States) 2003 | Did not enter | | | | | | | | Did not enter | | | | | | |
| (China) 2007 | Did not enter | | | | | | | | Did not enter | | | | | | |
| (Germany) 2011 | Did not enter | | | | | | | | Did not enter | | | | | | |
| (Canada) 2015 | Did not qualify | | | | | | | | 3 | 0 | 1 | 2 | 4 | 6 | −2 |
| (France) 2019 | Did not qualify | | | | | | | | 3 | 1 | 0 | 2 | 2 | 4 | −2 |
| (Australia) (New Zealand) 2023 | Did not qualify | | | | | | | | 10 | 1 | 2 | 7 | 7 | 35 | −28 |
| (Brazil) 2027 | Did not qualify | | | | | | | | 8 | 3 | 2 | 3 | 11 | 18 | −7 |
| (Costa Rica) (Jamaica) (Mexico) (United States) 2031 | To be determined | | | | | | | | To be determined | | | | | | |
| (United Kingdom) 2035 | To be determined | | | | | | | | To be determined | | | | | | |
| Total | - | - | - | - | - | - | - | - | 30 | 6 | 5 | 19 | 27 | 111 | −84 |

*Draws include knockout matches decided on penalty kicks.

=== Olympic Games ===
Summer Olympics record
| Year | Result | Pld | W | D | L | GF | GA |
|---|---|---|---|---|---|---|---|
| (United States) 1996 | Did not qualify | | | | | | |
| (Australia) 2000 | Did not qualify | | | | | | |
| (Greece) 2004 | Did not qualify | | | | | | |
| (China) 2008 | Did not qualify | | | | | | |
| (United Kingdom) 2012 | Did not qualify | | | | | | |
| (Brazil) 2016 | Did not qualify | | | | | | |
| (Japan) 2020 | Did not qualify | | | | | | |
| (France) 2024 | Did not qualify | | | | | | |
| Total | - | - | - | - | - | - | - |

=== UEFA Women's Championship ===
| UEFA Women's Championship record | | | | | | | | Qualifying record | | | | | | | |
| Year | Result | Pld | W | D* | L | GF | GA | Pld | W | D* | L | GF | GA | P/R | Rnk |
| 1984 to (Italy) 1993 | Did not exist | | | | | | | Did not exist | | | | | | | |
| (England) (Germany) (Norway) (Sweden) 1995 | Did not qualify | | | | | | | 4 | 0 | 1 | 3 | 1 | 24 | – | |
| (Norway) (Sweden) 1997 | Did not enter | | | | | | | Did not enter | | | | | | | |
| (Germany) 2001 | Did not enter | | | | | | | Did not enter | | | | | | | |
| (England) 2005 | Did not enter | | | | | | | Did not enter | | | | | | | |
| (Finland) 2009 | Did not qualify | | | | | | | 3 | 0 | 2 | 1 | 1 | 4 | – | |
| (Sweden) 2013 | Did not qualify | | | | | | | 3 | 1 | 1 | 1 | 5 | 3 | – | |
| (Netherlands) 2017 | Did not qualify | | | | | | | 3 | 1 | 1 | 1 | 3 | 3 | – | |
| (England) 2022 | Did not qualify | | | | | | | 8 | 0 | 0 | 8 | 1 | 32 | – | |
| (Switzerland) 2025 | Did not qualify | | | | | | | 6 | 2 | 1 | 3 | 5 | 10 | (Note: From Euro 2025 onwards a new qualifying format was introduced, linked to the Women's Nations League where teams are divided into leagues with promotion/relegation between the leagues at the end of each cycle.) | 47th |
| 2029 | To be determined | | | | | | | To be determined | | | | | | | |
| Total | - | - | - | - | - | - | - | 27 | 4 | 6 | 17 | 16 | 76 | 47th | |

*Draws include knockout matches decided on penalty kicks.

=== UEFA Women's Nations League ===
UEFA Women's Nations League record
| Year | League | Group | Pos | Pld | W | D | L | GF | GA | P/R | Rnk |
|---|---|---|---|---|---|---|---|---|---|---|---|
| 2023–24 | C | 2 | 2nd | 6 | 1 | 2 | 3 | 4 | 9 | Same position | 42nd |
| 2025 | C | 4 | 3rd | 4 | 1 | 0 | 3 | 6 | 6 | Same position | 45th |
| Total | | | | 10 | 2 | 2 | 6 | 10 | 15 | 42nd and 45th | |

| ▲ | Promoted at end of season |
| Same position | No movement at end of season |
| ▼ | Relegated at end of season |
| * | Participated in promotion/relegation play-offs |

== Honours ==
=== Regional ===
- **Women's Baltic Cup**
  - Champions (5): 1996, 1998, 2007, 2015, 2021

=== Friendly ===
- **Armenia Women's International Friendly Tournament**
  - Champions: 2021

== See also ==
- Sport in Lithuania
  - Football in Lithuania
    - Women's football in Lithuania
- Lithuania women's national football team
  - Lithuania women's national football team results
  - List of Lithuania women's international footballers
- Lithuania women's national under-20 football team
- Lithuania women's national under-17 football team
- Lithuania women's national futsal team
